= List of longest walks =

This is a list of the longest walks that have occurred in groups and on solo or duo projects. Many have promoted social causes or medical conditions. Some have been done mostly for the experience.

Groups consist of three or more people who walked at least most of the entire distance. Solo/duo walks are one or two people. The difference is that the former is tougher to organise logistically, especially when crossing international borders, since there generally needs to be greater accommodations and more thorough approvals for a group.

The walks should be continuous, save for a few weeks to organise through other countries. There is a separate section for long runs and wheelchair expeditions that were not walks.

== Longest group walks ==
These were walks involving three or more long-distance participants. They should be at least 2,500 miles (4,023 kilometers) and continuous, save for a few weeks to organise through other countries. If buses or cars are used as support, the distances those covered should not be included in the final total.

=== A Walk of the People – A Pilgrimage for Life ===
- Length: 7,000 miles (11,265 kilometers)
- Date: March 1984 – November 1985
- Distance walked per month: 368 miles (592 km)
- Details: A Walk of the People – A Pilgrimage for Life called for an end to the Cold War with better relations between the U.S. and the Soviet Union. Walkers started at Point Conception, California, and went through Texas and the Deep South to New York City. Some from the Peace Pilgrimage of Europeans, which left Washington state in early 1984, joined them in Washington, D.C. Eight participants flew to Dublin, Ireland, and walked to the border of the former East Germany. They obtained visas to Hungary and walked to that border before visiting several cities by train. Some walked to Geneva, Switzerland, then organised a trip to Moscow, Soviet Union, by train. The project attracted a wide range of support from across the political spectrum and was covered in the media by hundreds of newspapers and radio and television stations in those countries. It was the only walk from the U.S. to Moscow that went through the Deep South, Northern Ireland, and Hungary, which added to the mileage.

=== Bethlehem Peace Pilgrimage ===
- Length: 6,500 miles (10,461 km)
- Date: April 1982 – December 1983
- Distance walked per month: 342 miles (550 km)
- Details: This peace walk of about 20 core people started from Seattle and walked across the U.S. to Washington, D.C. Members then flew to Ireland and walked through much of Europe, taking a boat from Greece to the Middle East. The project ended in Bethlehem in the West Bank. It was led by Jesuit Fr. Jack Morris and Fr. George Zabelka, the pastor for the airmen who dropped the atomic bombs on Japan in 1945.

=== San Francisco to Moscow Walk for Peace ===
- Length: 5,900 miles (9,495 km)
- Date: December 1960 – October 1961
- Distance walked per month: 590 miles (950 km)
- Details: Organised by the Committee for Non-Violent Action, about ten people started from San Francisco and walked to New York in six months. More people joined in Europe, and the project, led by pacifist leaders A.J. Muste and Bradford Lyttle, covered about 5,900 miles (9,500 km) in just ten months. Unlike numerous projects, they were able to walk through the Soviet Union, and the distance walked per month was significantly higher than most long group walks. In 1963 and 1964, the CNVA organized the Cuba Peace Walk, which covered about 2,400 miles (3,862 km) from Quebec City, Canada, to Miami. Some of the 30 participants were jailed in Georgia, and the group's boat was confiscated by the U.S. Coast Guard in Miami when they tried to travel to Cuba.

=== A Walk to Moscow ===
- Length: 5,500 miles (8,851 km)
- Date: March 1981 – October 1983
- Distance walked per month: 275 miles (443 km)
- Details: This peace walk started from Bangor, Washington to Boston. Members continued in the United Kingdom, walking to the border of the former East Germany. Some stayed in a village for nine months to negotiate for visas to walk in Czechoslovakia and Poland. Some then traveled to cities in the Soviet Union by train and tried to walk to Moscow but were stopped and sent back to Minsk.

=== World Peace Walk ===
- Length: 5,500 miles (8,851 km)
- Date: April 1982 – August 1984
- Distance walked per month: 190 miles (306 km)
- Details: Led by writer and activist C.B. Hall, participants walked from Seattle to New York and then across much of Europe. They were not allowed to walk in Eastern Europe but obtained visas to camp and meet people in East Germany for a few days. Some visited Moscow to meet with Soviet Peace Committee officials.

=== On the Line ===
- Length: 5,000 miles (8,047 km)
- Date: March 1984 – March 1985
- Distance walked per month: 385 miles (620 km)
- Details: A group of women walked along the rail routes of the U.S. Department of Energy's secret trains, armored railcars used to transport nuclear weapons from the Pantex assembly plant in Amarillo, Texas, to coastal military bases in Bangor, Washington, and Charleston, South Carolina. They started in Bangor, walked to Pantex and then Charleston, pulling handcarts with their belongings. They usually camped out near the tracks. It was one of four cross-country marches in the U.S. in 1984, with the other three being A Walk of the People, A Walk for the Earth, and Peace Pilgrimage of Europeans.

=== HikaNation ===
- Length: 4,286 miles (6,898 km)
- Date: April 1980 – May 1981
- Distance walked per month: 330 miles (530 km)
- Details: HikaNation was a 14-month group backpacking journey starting at Golden Gate Park in San Francisco and ending at Cape Henlopen, Delaware. Led by Jim Kern (hiker), then president of the American Hiking Society, the effort sought to highlight the need for more hiking trails and promote hiking in general. Participants passed through 14 states and Washington, D.C.

=== Great Peace March for Global Nuclear Disarmament ===
- Length: 3,700 miles (5,955 km)
- Date: March 1986 – November 1986
- Distance walked per month: 435 miles (700 km)
- Details: The Great Peace March for Global Nuclear Disarmament started with about 1,200 long-term walkers in Los Angeles. They bogged down two weeks later in the desert under internal and financial problems. Some 500 marchers reorganized and continued to walk, including over the Rocky Mountains in Colorado. About 400 participants reached D.C. in November, with several hundred more joining for the final leg. Some organized an American-Soviet hybrid walk/bus ride of about 400 miles in Russia in 1987.

=== Peace-by-Peace Walk ===
- Length: 3,500 miles (5,633 km)
- Date: January 2002 – September 2002
- Distance walked per month: 438 miles [705 km]
- Details: Inspired by the cross-country walks of Peace Pilgrim, five women began walking from Berkeley, Calif. They traveled south into Arizona and made their way to Texas, Tennessee, North Carolina, and D.C. by the first anniversary of the 2001 terrorist attacks.

=== Women's Walk Across America ===
- Length: 3,345 miles (5,383 km)
- Date: March 2026 – November 2026
- Distance walked per month: 418 miles (673 km)
- Details: Emily Waugh, a community advocate and mother of two from Salem, Oregon, organized this relay-style walk to draw attention to what she and others viewed as political attacks on women’s rights, and to encourage more women to run for political office. Several others, including Waugh's mother, Amy Peck, retired circuit court judge Susan Tripp, and retired firefighter Melissa Cleary, began in Oregon and covered a significant portion of the distance. Numerous more joined en route for shorter periods. The group started walking from Salem on March 29, 2026, covering Idaho, Utah, Colorado, Kansas, and Missouri by August. They continued through Illinois, Indiana, Ohio, West Virginia, Pennsylvania, and Maryland, ending in Washington, D.C., on November 8, 2026. The project attracted media attention along the way and participated in rallies and marches, such as one of the October No Kings protests in Pittsburgh.

=== Interfaith Pilgrimage for Peace and Life ===
- Length: 3,100 miles (4,989 km)
- Date: December 1994 – August 1995
- Distance walked per month: 388 miles (624 km)
- Details: Led by Nipponzan-Myōhōji-Daisanga Japanese Buddhist monks, this walk started in Auschwitz, Poland, and ended in Nagasaki, Japan. More than 1,000 people from different nations joined at various times along the route that passed through war zones in Bosnia, as well as troubled parts of Israel, the West Bank, Jordan, Iraq, Cambodia, Vietnam, and the Philippines.

=== Great March for Climate Action ===
- Length: 3,000 miles (4,828 km)
- Date: March 2014 – November 2014
- Distance walked per month: 375 miles (604 km)
- Details: Led by former Iowa state representative Ed Fallon, the Great March for Climate Action called attention to the need for a more substantive response to climate change. About 34 people hiked most of the distance through Arizona, New Mexico, Colorado, Nebraska, Iowa, Indiana, and other states to D.C.

=== Hiroshima Interfaith Flame Walk ===
- Length: 3,000 miles (4,828 km)
- Date: January 2002 – May 2002
- Distance walked per month: 600 miles (966 km)
- Details: Japanese Buddhist monks from the order of Nipponzan Myohoji organized this walk from Seattle to the United Nations building in New York City that carried a flame kindled in 1945 from embers of the atomic bombing. Participants included Jun Yasuda, a Japanese nun who walked across the U.S. several times, and American Indian Movementleader Dennis Banks. Some then took the flame, carried in a glass lantern, to a uranium mine on Native American land in Arizona to bury it and symbolically close the nuclear circle. In 2025-26, Buddhist monks walked some 2,300 miles from Texas through the Deep South to D.C. The Walk for Peace USA included 24 participants and a mascot dog named Aloka (dog), who attracted significant media and social media attention.

=== The Longest Walk ===
- Length: 3,000 miles (4,828 km)
- Date: February 1978 – July 1978
- Distance walked per month: 600 miles (966 km)
- Details: Organized by the American Indian Movement, about 2,000 Native Americans and supporters left Alcatraz Island in San Francisco for a march to Washington, D.C., to affirm American Indians' land and water rights. Most took a bus, car, or plane for much of the distance, but 26 participants made the entire grueling, fast-paced walk on foot. Some said the walking conditions were horrible, as they had to camp and walk in the mountains during winter, as well as in much hotter temperatures. Some elders and organisers camped on the National Mall for several days at the end of the Longest Walk, while most camped at a local park. Speakers and supporters at events in D.C. included actor Marlon Brando, U.S. Rep. Ronald Dellums, Muhammad Ali, Sen. Edward Kennedy, and comedian Dick Gregory. Similar projects were organised in 1980, 1984, 2008, 2011, 2013, and 2016.

=== United Souls of Awareness Walk ===
- Length: 3,000 miles (4,828 km)
- Date: April 2006 – April 2007
- Distance walked per month: 267 miles (430 km)
- Details: Four musicians and/or artists in their 20s walked from Venice Beach, California to New York to encourage creative pursuits.

=== Bharat Jodo Yatra ===
- Length: 2,535 miles (4,080 km)
- Date: September 2022 – January 2023
- Distance walked per month: 507 miles (816 km)
- Details: Bharat Jodo Yatra, or Journey to Unite India, was a political campaign walk led by Indian National Congress leader Rahul Gandhi from Kanyakumari, the southern most point of mainland India, to the union territory of Jammu and Kashmir. The action attempted to build opposition against certain policies of the Bharatiya Janata Party-led Government of India. In elections held shortly after the end of the walk, Gandhi's party gained more support. The walk held a similar purpose to the solo 4,260-kilometer Bharat Yatra undertaken by former Prime Minister Chandra Shekhar in 1983 from Kanyakumari to New Delhi, though Gandhi's project involved numerous participants.

== Longest solo or duo walks ==
These are walks done by one or two people. They should be at least 5,000 miles (8,047 kilometers) and continuous, save for a few weeks to organise through other countries. If buses or cars are used as support, the distances those covered should not be included in the final total. The long time period of some usually relates to the difficulties of securing access to walk in certain countries.

=== Jean Béliveau ===
- Length: 46,914 miles (75,500 km)
- Date: August 2000 – October 2011
- Distance walked per month: 350 miles (560 km)
- Details: Setting out from Montreal, the Canadian small business owner wore out 49 pairs of shoes while walking through 64 countries in a little more than 11 years. He met four Nobel Peace Prize winners, including Nelson Mandela in South Africa. His walk raised awareness for children who suffer from violence, with the start of the project coinciding with a similarly themed United Nations initiative. He pushed a three-wheeled stroller carrying food and supplies such as a tent and returned to Montreal to a welcome of several hundred people.

=== Peace Pilgrim ===
- Length: 43,500 miles (70,006 km)
- Date: January 1953 – July 1981
- Distance walked per month: 128 miles (206 km)
- Details: Citing the need for a pilgrim to make a strong statement against militarism during the Korean War, Mildred Norman changed her name to Peace Pilgrim in 1953 and walked continuously back and forth across the U.S. She kept walking until her death in 1981, in a car accident after she accepted a ride to a speaking engagement. She stopped counting miles after reaching 25,000 miles (40,000 km) but estimated she covered 1,500 miles (2,400 km) per pair of sneakers, and wore out 29 pairs.

=== Karl Bushby ===
- Length: 31,000 miles (49,890 km)
- Date: November 1998 – November 2026
- Distance walked per month: 92 miles (148 km)
- Details: In November 1998, former British Army paratrooper Karl Bushby set off on the Goliath Expedition from the southern tip of Chile intending to become the first person to walk an unbroken path across the world back to his hometown in England without motorised transportation. He reached his hometown in November 2026. He spanned four continents in a journey of segments, even across water. In 2006, Bushby and a partner crossed the mostly frozen Bering Strait on foot. He also swam across the Caspian Sea and English Channel.

=== Nicolò Guarrera ===
- Length: 22,059 miles (35,501 km)
- Date: August 2020 – September 2025
- Distance walked per month: 362 miles (583 km)
- Details: Italian explorer Nicolò Guarrera spent five years walking around the world, moved by his childhood dream of writing a book. In September 2025, he crossed the border between Slovenia and Italy, culminating his journey. He walked across Western Europe, South America, Australia, India, the Arabian peninsula, Iran, Turkey, and the Balkans. He pushed a stroller named Ezio with supplies and equipment. During the journey, he had to deal with the Covid-19 pandemic in Europe, sailed across the Atlantic Ocean, and walked from the “Mitad del Mundo” in Quito to the “End of the World” in Ushuaia.

=== Ignacio Dean Mouliaá ===
- Length: 20,505 miles (33,000 km)
- Date: March 2013 – March 2016
- Distance walked per month: 570 miles (920 km)
- Details: Nicknamed "Nacho Dean," Spanish explorer and motivational speaker Mouliaá walked across several continents to raise awareness for the environment and goodwill. He traveled through 31 countries, pushing some food and supplies on a trekking tricycle. He survived violent attacks in Mexico, Peru, and El Salvador, as well as a dog bite in Honduras.

=== Chris Lewis ===
- Length: 19,894 miles (32,016 km)
- Date: 1 August 2017 – 30 July 2023
- Distance walked per month: 276 miles (444 km)
- Details: Chris Lewis walked more than 32,000 kilometers around the entire UK coastline in about six years, raising awareness and roughly £500,000 for the Armed Forces charity, SSAFA. The father of two was facing homelessness and struggling to cope with anxiety and depression after returning to civilian life from serving with the 2nd Battalion, Parachute Regiment. Lewis decided on the challenge while at Llangennith beach on the Gower peninsula, near his home city of Swansea, south Wales. The majority of the walk was spent completing the coastline of Scotland and its many islands. Lewis also walked the coastline of Northern Ireland. Along the way, he acquired a greyhound, Jet, and met Kate Barron, who joined him for the last three years of his trip. They had a child on the way, Magnus. Lewis wrote a book on his journey, entitled Finding Hildasay. The title comes from an uninhabited Scottish island where Lewis spent three months alone at the outset of the 2020 Covid pandemic.

=== George Meegan ===
- Length: 19,019 miles (30,608 km)
- Date: January 1977 – September 1983
- Distance walked per month: 238 miles (383 km)
- Details: George Meegan, a British adventurer and former Merchant Navy seaman, hiked across two continents, from the southern tip of South America at Tierra Del Fuego to the northernmost part of Alaska. He said he made the walk as a "celebration of freedom" and because he was not aware of anyone completing such a continuous journey along the two continents before. A few months into the project, he married Yoshiko Matsumoto of Japan in Argentina, and she accompanied him on part of the way. She returned to Japan twice to have their children, and the family traveled to be with him for the final leg.

=== Konstantin Rengarten ===
- Length: 16,700 miles (26,900 km)
- Date: August 1894 – September 1898
- Distance walked per month: 341 miles (549 km)
- Details: The highly educated Russian spent a decade preparing for what some believe was the first true walk around the world. Starting from Riga, he paid his own way and did not claim to be lured by a bet or dare, as some world walkers did. His route included South Russia, Iran, Armenia, Siberia, Mongolia, Japan, the US, France and Germany. He wrote regular reports to newspapers and did not change his story.

=== Steven Newman ===
- Length: 15,509 miles (24,959 km)
- Date: April 1983 – April 1987
- Distance walked per month: 323 miles (520 km)
- Details: 28-year-old Steven M. Newman from Ohio crossed 21 countries on a four-year solo walk. His motive was a "deep urge to find out if (the world) was really such a terrible place as everybody was saying." He concluded that it was not, even though he was arrested several times, attacked by bandits and a drunken construction worker, and had to fend off wild boars and other creatures.

=== David Kunst ===
- Length: 14,450 miles (23,260 km)
- Date: June 1970 – October 1974
- Distance walked per month: 278 miles (447 km)
- Details: With a mule and hero send-off, brothers John and David Kunst started walking from Minnesota to New York and then through Europe, with a goal of completing the first verified walk around the Earth. They also raised funds for UNICEF, although some questioned whether that had a pure motive. In Afghanistan, they were attacked by bandits, and John was shot and killed. David was also shot but survived by acting like he was dead. After returning to Minnesota for a few months to recuperate, David continued with another brother, Peter, from the point where John had died. They were denied access to the Soviet Union and China, and southeast Asia was wracked with war. So they flew from India to Australia. Peter left the project after developing leg problems, so David walked alone with a mule, which died, causing him to have to push supplies with a cart. An Australian teacher aided him, and he later married her, even though he had three children with a Minnesota woman who supported his walk. Guinness World Records cited his accomplishment as the "first verified achievement" of circumnavigating the planet.

=== Sergej Luk'janov ===
- Length: 14,292 mi (23,000 km)
- Date: April 2015 – February 2017
- Distance walked per month: 550 mi (885 km)
- Details: A former athlete, marathon walker, and pensioner from Russia, Luk'janov traveled around the world on foot. He visited 25 countries and four continents. He wore out ten pairs of sneakers and almost 100 pairs of socks, while turning 60 years old. He was robbed twice and planned a longer route, but he was denied a visa to Australia. He started and finished at St. Petersburg. He managed to stop by the 2016 Olympic Games in Brazil.

=== Karsten "Mütze" Rinck ===
- Length: 13,981 miles (22,500 km)
- Date: April 2021 – May 2026
- Distance walked per month: 229 mi (369 km)
- Details: With his dog, Lotte, Rinck started walking from Germany in 2021 for his mental health. He was still at it in May 2026, according to his Instagram account. He was inspired in part by other long-distance walkers like Jean Béliveau.

=== Prem Kumar ===
- Length: 10,500 miles (16,898 km)
- Date: October 1982 – August 1986
- Distance walked per month: 228 miles (367 km)
- Details: As founder of social service organizations in India, Prem Kumar walked through more than a dozen nations to raise awareness for world peace and more development in poorer countries. He then organised walks in India involving participants from other countries.

=== Pablo Nemo ===
- Length: 9,300 miles (15,000 km)
- Date: November 2021 – January 2024
- Distance walked per month: 345 miles (555 km)
- Details: Pablo Nemo, a Spanish adventurer and explorer, embarked on an unprecedented journey across Africa, spanning 11 countries from Cape Town to Cairo. Walking alone and unassisted, he traversed South Africa, Lesotho, Zimbabwe, Botswana, Zambia, Malawi, Tanzania, Kenya, Ethiopia, Saudi Arabia, and Egypt. Nemo's journey was a celebration of cultural and geographical diversity. Along the way, he received recognition from various organizations, including being named the Tourism Ambassador of Zanzibar and receive the Medal of Honor from the National Youth Council in Egypt.

=== Alexandre and Sonia Poussin ===
- Length: 8,699 miles (14,000 km)
- Date: January 2001 – April 2004
- Distance walked per month: 223 miles (359 km)
- Details: French travel writers Alexandre Poussin and Sonia Poussin walked across Africa from Cape Town in South Africa to the Sea of Galilee in Israel. Hundreds of people provided food and shelter, and Sonia became gravely ill with malaria for more than a week. During the final few months, she was pregnant with their first child. In 1997, Alexandre Poussin and adventure travel writer Sylvain Tesson covered the Himalayas by foot from Bhutan to Tajikistan. During that journey of 3,100 miles (4,989 km), they secretly crossed some closed borders.

=== Rainer Mautz ===
- Length: 8,330 miles (13,410 km) (ongoing)
- Date: February 2025 – March 2026 (ongoing)
- Distance walked per month: 673 miles (1,083 km)
- Details: Rainer Mautz is currently undertaking a long-distance hike from Portugal to Singapore, following one of the longest continuous overland routes across the Eurasian continent. He is covering the full distance on foot, except in situations where the use of vehicles is unavoidable, for example when crossing a river would otherwise require a detour of several hundred kilometers, or where traveling by vehicle is legally mandated between border checkpoints. On his way he is also visiting confluence points if they lie nearby his route.

=== Louis Michael Figueroa ===
- Length: 7,500 miles (12,100 km)
- Date: January 2005 – June 2005, June 2010 – January 2011
- Distance walked per month: 536 miles (863 km)
- Details: Walking for victims of child abuse in January 2005, Figueroa was forced to stop after six months due to legal issues and complications from leukemia. He started again in 2010 and finished the circumference route around the US in Tucson, Arizona. In 1982, Figueroa ran across the country in just 60 days to raise funds for cancer victims. He walked across the country to raise funds for AIDS victims in 1996.

=== Ichiro Omura ===
- Length: 12,000 kilometres (7,500 mi)
- Date: 14 June 1994 – 6 November 1996
- Distance walked per month: 418 kilometres (260 mi)
- Details: His 622-page Japanese book "900 Days on the Silk Road: Walking 12,000 km from Xi'an to Rome" provides dates, distances, map drawings and some photos.

=== Jaydip Lakhankiya "The Climate Walker" ===
- Length: 12,000 kilometres (7,500 mi) (ongoing)
- Date: February 2026 – ongoing
- Distance walked per month: 666 kilometres (414 mi)
- Details: Jaydip started walking from Malta in June 2026 to spread awareness about climate change. He is collecting one bag of garbage each day to show that one ordinary person can do something impactful for the Earth. He reached Bulgaria after 4,500 kilometers in late September 2026 and plans to eventually cover 12,000 kilometers across 20 countries, ending in India. He has already walked in Malta, Italy, Vatican City, San Marino, Slovenia, Croatia, Bosnia, Serbia, Kosovo, Montenegro, Albania, and Bulgaria. His remaining route includes Greece, Balkans, Turkey, Georgia, Armania, Iran, Pakistan, and India.

=== Shihab Chottur ===
- Length: 5,368 miles (8,639 km)
- Date: June 2022 – May 2023
- Distance walked per month: 447 miles (719 km)
- Details: Shihab Chottur, who walked on foot from the Indian state of Kerala Athavanad, reached the Makkah in Saudi Arabia after covering a distance of more than 8600 kilometers to perform the Haj.

=== Bart Jezierski ===
- Length: 5,000 mi (8,047 km)
- Date: March 2021 – May 2022
- Distance walked per month: 357 miles (575 km)
- Details: Embarking on a solo effort called the European Walk for Peace and Freedom, Polish social activist Jezierski walked some 5,000 miles on the latest part in 2021 and 2022. The Peace Walking project passed through Poland, Germany, Holland, Belgium, Luxembourg, Switzerland, Liechtenstein, Italy, Slovenia, Croatia, Bosnia and Herzegovina, Republika Srpska, Montenegro, Albania, Greece, Bulgaria, Romania, Hungary, and Slovakia, fundraising for Polish Humanitarian Action. He also walked about 3,700 miles in 2017-18 in Europe, raising funds for Glasgow Children's Hospital Charity, and about 1,900 miles in 2016.

=== Others ===
Here are some others who don't fulfill the criteria for a detailed listing.

- Bernard Ollivier, a French journalist and author, walked more than 7,400 miles (11,909 km) from Turkey to China between 1999 and 2002 in four separate walks.
- Jens Kwass, a German travel writer and student, walked more than 6,000 miles (9,656 km) in Europe between 2011 and 2016, taking long breaks.
- Avdhesh Sharma of India was the first to hike from the northernmost village of Thang to the southernmost tip of India at Cape Comorin. The 2021 journey of 2,600 miles (4,184 km) took about four months and raised awareness for environmental and medical causes.
- Yakut shaman Alexander Gabyshev started walking in 2019 from Sakha Republic in far east Russia with the goal of reaching Moscow about 5,000 miles (8,047 km) away and performing a ritual to attempt to make President Vladimir Putin resign. He was joined for a short while by others, but after about 2,000 miles (3,219 km), Russian authorities arrested him and sent him to a psychiatric hospital. In 2021, Yakutsk City Court ordered Gabyshev to be confined indefinitely to a psychiatric hospital, where he remains as of 2026, despite opposition from Amnesty International and other organisations.

== Longest runs, wheelchair expeditions ==
These are long runs or wheelchair journeys. They should be at least 20,000 miles (32,187 kilometers) and continuous, save for a few weeks to organise through other countries. If buses or cars are used as support, the distances those covered should not be included in the final total.

=== Tony Mangan ===
- Length: 31,069 miles (50,001 km)
- Date: October 2010 – October 2014
- Distance run per month: 647 miles (1,041 km)
- Details: Beginning in his native Ireland, distance runner Tony Mangan jogged through North America, Central and South America, Australia, Asia and Europe, raising funds for a charity that battled depression. He ran with a stroller named Nirvana, which carried a tent, clothes, food, and other belongings.

=== Robert Garside ===
- Length: 29,826 miles (48,000 km)
- Date: October 1997 – June 2003
- Distance run per month: 439 miles (707 km)
- Details: British runner Robert Garside was cited by Guinness World Records as being the first person to run around the world. He started in India and jogged through Tibet, China, Japan, Australia, South America, Mexico, the US, Africa, Turkey and back to India. He had considerable corporate sponsors and met his future wife in Venezuela. He got mugged twice at gunpoint and was jailed in China.

=== Rick Hansen ===
- Length: 24,900 miles (40,100 km)
- Date: March 1985 – May 1987
- Distance wheeled per month: 958 miles (1,542 km)
- Details: Canadian wheelchair athlete Rick Hansen pushed his way through 34 countries on four continents. He wheeled on the Great Wall of China and met Pope John Paul II at the Vatican. He wore out 160 tires and was robbed four times. The project raised $26 million for spinal cord injury research.

== See also ==
- List of pedestrian circumnavigators
- Transcontinental walk
- List of people who have walked across the United States
- List of people who have walked across Australia
- List of people who have walked across Canada
- Twenty-first-century fundraising walks in Tasmania
- List of people who have run across Australia
