= Peace walk =

March to raise awareness for issues

A peace walk or peace march, sometimes referred to as a peace pilgrimage, is a form of nonviolent action where a person or group marches a set distance to raise awareness for particular issues important to the walkers.

A 1967 newsreel depicting several peace walks.

== 350 km Long Peace Walk New Zealand ==
Kharlzada Kasrat Rai, twice the World Record holder for Peace Walks, has devoted his life for the cause of Peace, Education, Health and Cultural activities. He has achieved a widespread fame for the sake of his noble cause.

He has conducted several walks with the flag of peace within and beyond the boundaries of Pakistan.

In 2020, he made a 350 km Long Peace Walk from Wellington to Christchurch in commemoration of the Christchurch Mosques Attack. He is doing this walk voluntarily for the sake of humanity and Peace. The Peace Walk will start from New Zealand Parliament on 5 March.

== India ==
Starting in 1951, Vinoba Bhave undertook a peace walk with many of his followers throughout India for land reform. He walked for more than a decade, asking landowners to consider him a son and give him one-sixth of their land for him to distribute to the poor.

A peace walk campaign called "Freedom Walk" was organized by the Free Software Community in Kerala in 2008. Four volunteers walked 750 miles (1,210 km) from one end of the state to the other to promote free software.

== Europe ==
During the Second World War, peace pilgrimages took place across Europe with the aim of bringing an end to the conflict. In Italy, pilgrims prayed at Loreto and Assisi. In Wales they went on pilgrimage to St David's Cathedral, in France they went on pilgrimage to Our Lady of Pontmain who had saved the French in an earlier war. In Ireland and Switzerland, pilgrims prayed that the war would not spread across their borders.

=== Hungary and Italy ===
In 2014, a group launched the first permanent peace walk route, which runs from Budapest along the former division between Eastern and Western Europe, and ends in Trieste, Italy. Donol Corcoran of Ireland had completed the "European Peace Walk" six times by July 2019.

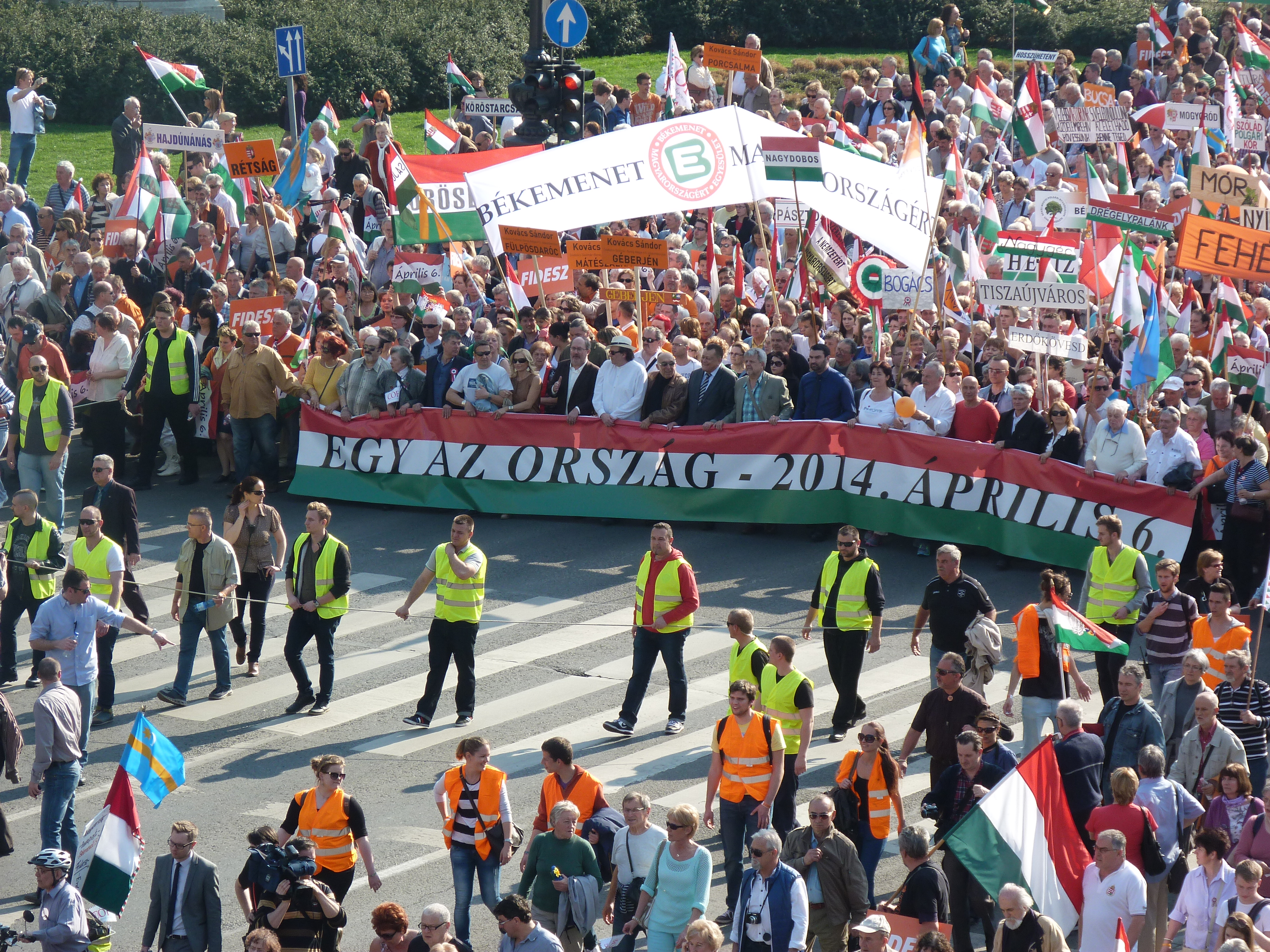
Peace walk for the Unity of Hungary, on 29 March 2014

A peace walk for the Unity of Hungary occurred in March 2014.

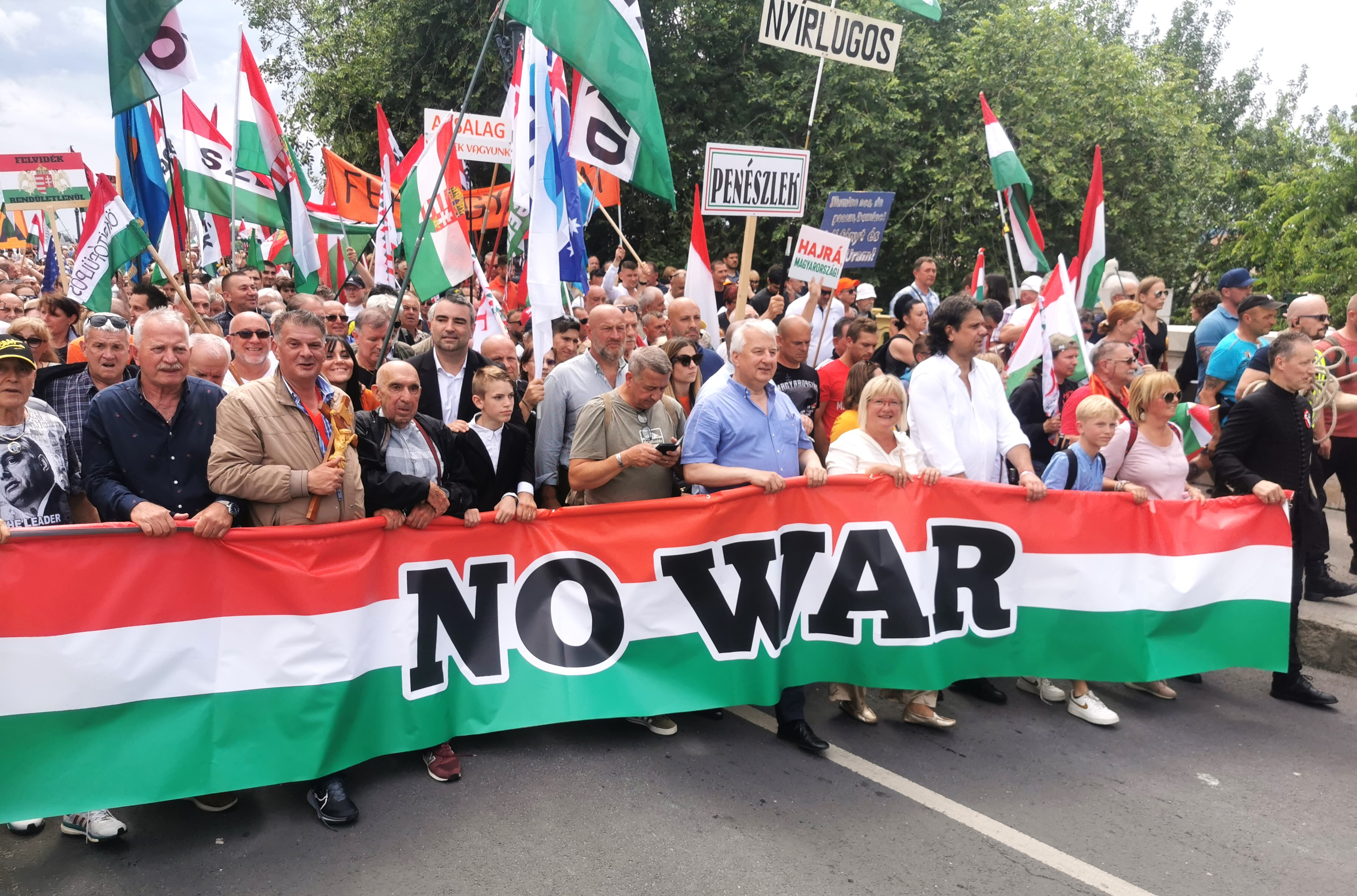
2024 Anti-war demonstration in Budapest

On 1 June 2024, Tens of thousands march in Budapest in a peace march. People wave flags and signs reading "No War".

=== United Kingdom ===
In 1984, members of a peace camp walked 26 miles from RAF Daws Hill to Naphill through country roads to raise money for The Angry Pacifist magazine.

== United States ==
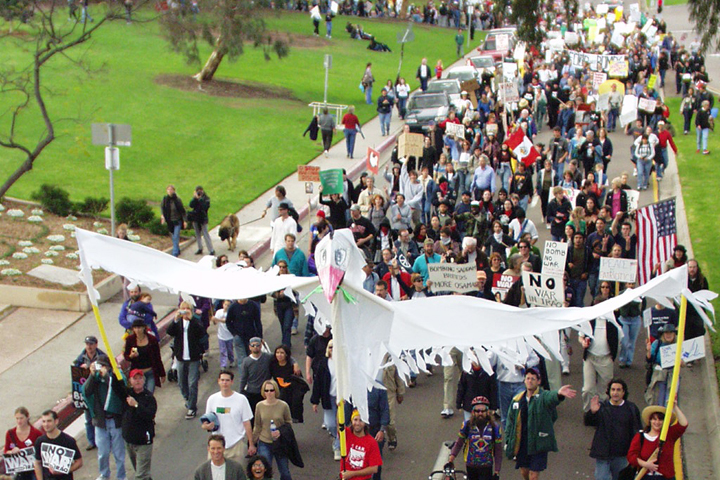
About 7,000 San Diego Peace Marchers in Balboa Park Protest the Iraq War, 15 March 2003

Various peace organizations throughout the United States organized marches to protest wars, including the Iraq War, on a regular basis. Sometimes these marches are coordinated to take place on the same day across the nation. In San Diego, the greatest number of anti-war protesters, an estimated 7,000, turned out for a demonstration on 15 March 2003, five days before the beginning of the Iraq War.

Native Americans have organized numerous cross-country peace walks, including the "Longest Walk" in 1978 and the "Long Walk for Survival" in 1980. The projects raised awareness not only for peace, but environmental issues and protection of native sites. In 1984, several walks crossed the nation, including "On the Line," which traced the route of trains carrying nuclear weapons from Bangor Base, Washington, to Charleston, South Carolina, and the "Peace Pilgrimage of Europeans."

The Carter-King Peace Walk at Freedom Park in Atlanta opened in 2003. The 1.5-mile stretch connects the landmarks that commemorate the only two Georgia winners of the Nobel Peace Prize: Martin Luther King Jr. and Jimmy Carter.

The Bridge Walk for Peace is held every year since 2008 on April 4 in Philadelphia to commemorate the assassination anniversary of Dr. King is the longest such observance in the country. The event gathers individuals at sunrise at the foot of the Benjamin Franklin Bridge to walk to the pinnacle and offer a prayer for peace.

In 2025, a Walk for Peace was started by Buddhist monks from the Huong Dao Vipassana Bhavana Center in Fort Worth, Texas with a destination of Washington, D.C., making a journey of 2,300 miles across 10 states.

== International ==
=== From India across the world ===
From 1963 to 1965, two members of Gandhi's Sarvodaya movement, Satish Kumar and E.P. Menon, walked an estimated 8,000 miles from New Delhi to Washington, D.C., via Pakistan, Afghanistan, Iran, Russia, Poland, Germany, France, and Belgium. They crossed the channel and Atlantic Ocean via ships. Their prior experience of Bhave gave two gifts to Kumar and Menon: pennilessness, i.e. voluntary poverty, and vegetarianism.

From 1982 through 1986, Prem Kumar walked more than 17,000 kilometers (about 10,500 miles) around the world for international peace and disarmament. He organized walks in India involving participants from all over the world and founded social service organizations.

=== Interfaith Pilgrimage for Peace and Life ===
The "Interfaith Pilgrimage for Peace and Life" started in Auschwitz, Poland, on 8 December 1994, and ended in Nagasaki on the 50th anniversary of the Nagasaki bombing on 9 August 1995. It was led by Nipponzan-Myōhōji-Daisanga Japanese Buddhist monks. The monks, however, were dwarfed in number by American, European, South American, and Japanese lay people.

The trip was organized to commemorate the 50th anniversary of the end of World War II as well as to be a witness to suffering in contemporary war zones. From Auschwitz, the group walked to Vienna, then traveled through Croatia, Bosnia and Serbia. They crossed the front lines of the Bosnian War in Mostar and held a day of vigil, fasting and prayer there. The next leg took them through Israel, the Gaza Strip, the West Bank, Jordan and Iraq.

The group traveled across the front lines in Cambodia, where they joined the Dhammayietra, an annual Cambodian peace walk led by Maha Ghosananda, known by some as the "Gandhi of Cambodia." They then visited war sites in Vietnam and the Philippines before going to Hiroshima and Nagasaki.

This walk was one of many peace pilgrimages organized by the Nipponzan-Myōhōji-Daisanga monks, but this one was among the largest and longest. More than 1,000 people participated in at least part of the pilgrimage, including Buddhists, Quakers, Catholics, Muslims and Jews.

=== A Walk to Moscow ===
Donna Bradley and her son on A Walk For Survival, Oregon Coast, 22 April 1980

"A Walk to Moscow" was one of many walks for peace in the 20th century. They were specially organized by groups of pacifists and peace activists who wanted to protest against the politics of war and the use of chemical, biological and nuclear weapons.

In 1960–61, the Committee for Non-Violent Action organized the "San Francisco to Moscow Walk for Peace." The group covered some 6,000 miles in ten months and was able to walk through Russia. Walk organizer Bradford Lyttle wrote a book on the project called You Come with Naked Hands.

In 1981–83, a group walked across the United States and Europe to Moscow to show solidarity with all people and to demonstrate in a grassroots way that all people are linked by their right to live on the earth in peace and safety. This walk was conceived by organizers while on another peace walk called "A Walk for Survival", which went from Santa Cruz, California, to Bangor Base, Washington, in 1980. While at a requested meeting with the Russian Consulate in San Francisco, co-organizer Jack Chalmers asked if the group continued to walk eastward across the U.S. and then to Europe, would it be allowed to walk to Moscow? The Consulate official answered, "Of course."

So when "A Walk for Survival" ended at the site of a Trident nuclear submarine base in Bangor, organizers immediately started planning "A Walk to Moscow." The project began in Bangor on 1 March 1981, and reached the East Coast in time to stay for the winter in Boston. Members flew to Europe in March 1982 and walked across the United Kingdom, France, Belgium, and Federal Republic of Germany. Members took some side trips to Ireland and West Berlin by bus, returning to the starting point so the walking route could continue uninterrupted. Advance teams were sent a few weeks ahead to cities and towns along a prospective route to organize media opportunities, speaking engagements and accommodations. Decisions were made by complete consensus, which often led to long and stormy meetings.

The German Democratic Republic had refused entry to the group, so members walked south to Bavaria and stayed there for the winter while negotiating for visas to enter Czechoslovakia, Poland and the USSR. "A Walk to Moscow" (the indefinite article, rather than the definite "The Walk," was important to many original walkers, as it implied that it was only one initiative and others would hopefully follow. The distinction was, however, lost on people in the Eastern countries as Slavonic languages do not have words for "an" or "the.") spent nearly a year in Europe working from an old mill house in Regnitzlosau, Germany.

It was difficult to get the governments then in the Communist Bloc to allow the group to walk through their territory. While some group members negotiated, other walkers visited places on foot in Germany and gave talks to local peace groups. Some members got involved in passive resistance, chaining themselves to railings over conscription in Germany, and others fasted for peace in the world. Some went to Denmark to meet with peace groups and talk about the walk.

In 1983, visas were obtained for Czechoslovakia and Poland, and a continuous walking route was planned and successfully carried out as far as the border between Poland and the USSR. Relations with official peace groups in those countries were tricky; the Czech government tried to incorporate the initiative into its showpiece pro-Warsaw Pact 1983 conference in Prague. However, the group did not participate, although a few members lobbied delegates outside and were invited in for one discussion.

Walking across the USSR was not permitted, however. The group entered and transited to Minsk, then Smolensk, hoping for some compromise in negotiations. But that did not happen. At this point, many members chose to return and not go to Moscow; some tried to walk to Moscow anyway but were immediately apprehended and sent to rejoin the others in Minsk. When the walk finished, some people from the group talked at a CND rally about their work and the passive resistance movement. The group membership was international, as people came from all over the world to join and make a difference.

Some Walk to Moscow participants later met with other walks that crossed the U.S. and Europe, including Walk of the People - A Pilgrimage for Life, which occurred from 1984 to 1985. That project was also not allowed to walk in Russia, but some members rode a train to Moscow to meet with officials and ordinary people.

=== Women Cross DMZ ===
The Women Cross DMZ (Korean demilitarized zone) group, which included noted American feminist and activist Gloria Steinem, Nobel Peace Prize laureate Mairead Maguire, and organizer Christine Ahn, conducted a peace symposium in Pyongyang in May 2015. The all-women group was allowed to cross the DMZ, separating North and South Korea, for peace a few days after the symposium.

On 24 May 2015, International Women's Day for Disarmament, thirty women— including feminist leader Gloria Steinem, two Nobel Peace laureates and retired Colonel Ann Wright— from 15 different countries linked arms with 10,000 Korean women, stationing themselves on both sides of the DMZ to urge a formal end to the Korean War (1950–1953), the reunification of families divided during the war, and a peace building process with women in leadership positions to resolve decades of hostility. It was unusual for South Korea and North Korea to reach consensus on allowing peace activists to enter the tense border area, one of the world's most dangerous places, where hundreds of thousands of troops are stationed in a heavily mined zone that divides South Korea from nuclear North Korea.

In the weeks leading up to the walk, feminist Gloria Steinem told the press, "It’s hard to imagine any more physical symbol of the insanity of dividing human beings."

On the day of the crossing, South Korea refused to give the women permission to walk through Panmunjom, a border town where the 1953 truce was signed, so the women had to eventually cross the border by bus. Nevertheless, Steinem labeled the crossing a success. "We have accomplished what no one said can be done, which is to be a trip for peace, for reconciliation, for human rights and a trip to which both governments agreed."

In addition to Steinem, participants in the crossing included organizer Christine Ahn from Hawaii; feminist Suzuyo Takazato from Okinawa; Amnesty International human rights lawyer Erika Guevara of Mexico; Liberian peace and reconciliation advocate Leymah Gbowee; Philippines lawmaker Liza Maza; Northern Ireland peace activist Mairead Maguire and Colonel Ann Wright, a retired officer who resigned from the U.S. military to protest the US invasion of Iraq.

Supporters of the crossing met criticism with insistence that war, which divides and destroys families, impacts women, as well as men; therefore, if governments led by men cannot or will not lead the peace process, grassroots women have every right to take to the streets—and even the DMZ. Participants said the crossing focused global attention on the unnecessarily protracted Korean War, with support from world leaders, including UN Secretary General Ban Ki-Moon, Archbishop Desmond Tutu, the Dalai Lama, former US President Jimmy Carter and South Korean lawmakers.

For Ahn and the others, the crossing symbolized a reaffirmation of peace through dialogue, as opposed to an escalating arms race.

Crossing participant Kozue Akibayashi, International President, Women's League for Peace and Freedom, wrote, "Addressing the division and bringing peace to the Korean Peninsula is not only the task for North and South Korea, but a responsibility of the international community." Akibayashi said Women Cross DMZ strongly condemns the North Korean government's human rights violations while recognizing that such violations must be viewed through the lens of a "society where the priorities of the military outweigh the basic needs of its people." Akibayashi also featured as a keynote speaker at the first annual Peace Education Conference, held virtually in September 2021.

=== European Walks for Peace and Freedom ===
Peace Walking is a humanitarian long‑distance walking initiative founded in 2016 by Bartłomiej Jezierski, a Polish traveller and social activist. The project, rooted in Jezierski’s survival‑based expeditions known as the European Walks for Peace and Freedom (EWPF), has covered around 18,000 km across 39 European countries. Its purpose was to understand homelessness and irregular migration of people affected by armed conflicts through direct experience — walking without money, sleeping outdoors, crossing borders on foot, and meeting displaced people along the way.

Jezierski completed three major EWPF expeditions (2016, 2017/18, 2021/22), each combining extreme physical endurance with humanitarian fundraising. His journeys involved encounters with migrants, homeless individuals, police interventions, harsh weather, illness, and spiritual experiences in places such as Assisi, the Vatican, Santiago de Compostela and Fátima. He documented all expeditions in handwritten notebooks forming the basis for several books.

Peace Walking has been recognised by local media and is evolving into a compassion‑driven foundation supporting children affected by conflict and disaster. Its social‑media archive contains thousands of photographs and stories from the walks. The project emphasises solidarity, minimalism, and the belief that genuine understanding arises from physical presence and shared human vulnerability.

== See also ==
- List of longest walks
- Peace Walking
- Claude Anshin Thomas – American Zen Buddhist monk
- Peace Pilgrim – American peace activist, spiritual teacher
- Preah Maha Ghosananda – Cambodian Buddhist monk (1913/1924–2007)
- Terasawa Junsei – Japanese Buddhist monk (born 1950)
- Dhammayietra
- Walk for Peace – International peace walk by Buddhist monks
