= Trans Europe Foot Race =

Long-distance ultramarathon

The Trans Europe Foot Race is a multiday long-distance ultramarathon that consists of running across Europe.

== 2003 race ==
The 2003 Trans Europe Foot Race was organized by Ingo Schultze. It ran from Lisbon to Moscow in 64 days and covered approximately 5,100 kilometres (3,200 mi). Out of 44 starters, there were 22 finishers including one wheelchair athlete, with Mariko Sakamoto the only woman to finish. The event was won by Robert Wimmer from Germany.

== 2009 race ==
The 2009 Trans Europe Foot Race was also organized by Ingo Schultze. The route started in Bari, Italy and finished in North Cape, Norway. It mostly avoided big cities and passed for example Foggia, Fano, Schlanders, Seeg, Waldkappel before using the ferry Kiel-Gothenburg, and then passing for example Kristinehamn, Sveg, Storuman, Jokkmokk, Enontekiö, and Alta. Again this was a 64-day race. The total distance was 4,485 kilometres (2,787 mi). The race began on April 19, 2009 and ended on June 21, 2009.

The male winner was Rainer Koch from Germany with a running time of 378 hours and 12 minutes. The female winner was Takako Furuyama from Japan, with a running time of 529 hours and 6 minutes. 45 runners finished the race.

=== List of competitors for 2009 race ===
From Germany:

- Hermann Böhm (Weiherhammer)
- Hans Damm (Neu-Isenburg)
- Sigrid Eichner (Berlin) Female
- Dagmar Großheim (Gräfenberg) Female
- Joachim Hauser (Dettenhausen)
- Martina Hausmann (Würzburg) Female
- Marcel Heinig (Cottbus)
- Achim Heukemes (Gräfenberg)
- Richard Hofbauer (Rosenheim)
- Theo Huhnholt (Waldkraiburg)
- Heinz Jäckel (Hennef)
- Rainer Koch (Dettelbach)
- Jörg Koenig (Stade)
- Klaus Neumann (Stuttgart)
- Heike Pawzik (Rostock) Female
- Hans-Jürgen Schlotter (Horb-Bittelbronn)
- Werner Selch (Amberg)
- Elke Streicher (Gerlingen) Female
- René Strosny (Filderstadt)
- Bernd Wagner (Duisburg)
- Klaus Wanner (Holzgerlingen)
- Robert Wimmer (Nürnberg / Bayern)
- Tom Wolter-Roessler (Ulm-Böfingen)
- Ullrich Zach (Rödental)
- Jürgen Zuth (Siegelsbach)

From Finland:

- Janne Kankaansyrjä (Järvenpää)

From France:

- Gèrard Denis (Fouesnant)
- Jean-Herve Duchesne (Saint-Germain)
- Alain Lemarchand (Neuric sur I'Isle)
- Christophe Midelet (Gizy / Aisne)
- Stephane Pelissier (Lanta)
- Fabrice Viaud (Rezè)
- Roger Warenghem (Le Touvet)

From Japan:

- Kenji Hara (Utsunomiya, Tochigi)
- Kazuhiko Horiguchi (Kitakata, Fukushima)
- Kazuko Kaihata (Kurashiki, Okayama) Female
- Yasuo Kanai (Yokohama, Kanagawa)
- Saeko Kishimoto (Gunma) Female
- Shoji Konoeda (Osaka)
- Shigeru Mitsuhashi (Sapporo, Hokkaido)
- Koji Nakamura (Higashi Yodagawa)
- Yasumasa Namikoshi (Osaka)
- Hiroko Okiyama (Fussa, Tokio) Female
- Takasumi Senoo (Yokohama)
- Tsuyoshi Sugawara (Hasuda, Saitama)
- Furuyama Takako (Tokyo) Female
- Okuno Tomoko (Tokyo) Female

From Korea:

- Ahn Byeung Sik (Seogwipo)

From Netherlands:

- Ria Buiten (Biddinghuize) Female
- Theo Cloosterman (Veldhoven)
- Jenni De Groot (Leeuwarden) Female
- Ubel Dijk (Drachten)
- Theo Kuijpers (Westerbeek)
- Jan Nabuurs (Westerbeck)
- Cor Westhuis (Dalfsen)

From Norway:

- Eiolf Eivindsen (Mosjøen)
- Trond Sjavik (Mosjøen)
- Henry Wehder (Nordre Toten/Nordli)

From Sweden:

- Matthias Bramstång (Halmstad)
- Andreas Falk (Sollentuna)

From Switzerland:

- Markus Bernhard (Thunstetten)
- Christian Fatton (Noiraigue)
- Christian Marti (Zürich)
- Martin Wagen (Biel-Benke)

From Taiwan:

- Ching-Hui Chen (Taipei)

From Turkey:

- Mike Friedl (Istanbul)

From USA:

- Russell Secker (Austin, Texas)

== 2012 race ==
The race was run again in 2012. It went from Skagen, Denmark to Gibraltar, passing e.g. Haderslev, Ahrensburg, Waldkappel, Frankenbach, Valdoie, Bourganeuf, St-Pons-de-Thomieres, Berga, Teruel and Puente Genil. The total distance was 4175 km and the race took 64 days. The male winner was Peter Bartel from Germany with 354:25:21, and the female winner was Ria Buiten from the Netherlands with 504:18:29.

== 2025 race ==
In 2025 a new edition of the Transeuropalauf is being planned. The event is organised by Thomas Dornburg and is 41 stages from Flensburg to San Marino. The route is 2,247 km and is a daily average of 54 km.

== See also ==
- Transcontinental walk
