= Kharlzada Kasrat Rai =

Pakistani world record holder (born 1976)

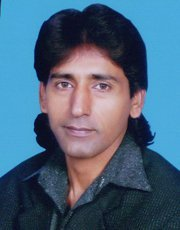
- Known for: Peace walks
- Website: www.kasratrai.com

Kharlzada Kasrat Rai is a Pakistani two-time holder of the World Record for Peace Walks. On October 1, 2013, he completed a walk of 6,387 kilometres (3,969 mi) to reach Mecca from Karachi to perform Haj. He started his walk on June 7, 2013.

== Early life ==
Kharlzada Kasrat Rai was born circa 1976.

== Past walks ==
- In 2020, he made a 350 kilometres (220 mi) Long Peace Walk from Wellington to Christchurch in commemoration of the Christchurch Mosques Attack.
- In 2013, he walked 6,387 kilometres (3,969 mi) between Karachi and Makkah, a journey is completed in 114 days.
- In 2009, he walked 327 kilometres (203 mi) from Lahore to Islamabad in 14 days.
- In 2007, he walked 1,999 kilometres (1,242 mi) between Khyber and Karachi in Pakistan, a journey he completed in 85 days.

A website for Kharlzada Kasrat Rai lists seventeen other walks for charitable causes over the period from 2007 to 2023.
