= Transcontinental walk =

Crossing of a continent on foot

A transcontinental walk involves crossing a continent on foot. If a walk does not cross the entire continent but starts and ends in major cities near two opposing sides, it is usually considered transcontinental. People have crossed continents walking alone or in groups.

== Purpose ==
Some people have completed a transcontinental walk on a whim or as a result of a bet. Others have attempted transcontinental expeditions for scientific study or exploration. Transcontinental marches have been organized to serve as a demonstration to attract interest in some topic or raise funds for a cause.

== Challenges ==
Depending on the continent to be crossed, different challenges arise. To cross Antarctica on foot, supplying provisions would have to be well-planned. Crossing any continent on foot is also a test of endurance and physical condition. People who do a crossing without support have to transport equipment, tent, food etc., on a carriage or sled. That is an extra challenge, compared to those who have car support.

Group transcontinental walks can be tougher to organize logistically than solo or duo efforts, especially when crossing international borders, since there generally need to be greater accommodations and more thorough approvals for a group. There is also a tougher process of decision making with even a small group than with one or two people. People walking in groups sometimes say that the walking part is easier than dealing with group politics and dynamics. One participant in the Great Peace March for Global Nuclear Disarmament, a transcontinental group march of about 500 people in 1986, said, “We can’t agree on anything except to knock on the Porta-Potty.”

== Many Continents ==
=== Karl Bushby ===
He has crossed 4 continents without interruption only with his legs:

- South America (1/11/1998-1/11/2000): From Punta Arenas to Panama via the Darién Gap.
- Central & North America (1/11/2000-17/03/2006): From Panama to Alaska. The crossing of the Bering Strait on foot (ski) was from 17 March to arrive in Russia on 31 March.
- Asia (31 March- 2 May 2025): From Russia to Istanbul in Turkey. There was a 32 days, 288km swim, from Kazakhstan to Azerbaijan in October 2024. On 2 May 2025, he crossed the bridge on the Bosphorus, went back to Asian Istanbul and left the country to prepare the European leg.
- Europe (2 May 2025-1 November 2026 (Estimated)): He resumed his walk on 3 September 2025 from the European side of Istanbul to France.

== North America ==
=== Charles Fletcher Lummis ===
In 1884, Charles Fletcher Lummis was working for a newspaper in Cincinnati when he was offered a job with the Los Angeles Times. Lummis decided to make the 3,500-mile journey from Cincinnati to Los Angeles on foot. He chronicled the 143 days of his journey, sending weekly dispatches to the newspaper. In spite of a broken arm and heavy snows in New Mexico, he finished the trip, and in 1892, his writings of the journey were published as a book, A Tramp Across the Continent.

=== John Hugh Gillis ===
In 1906, on a bet and a dare, John Hugh Gillis walked from North Sydney, Nova Scotia to Vancouver, British Columbia. He was the first person to cross Canada on foot.

=== Roger Guy English ===
In 1970, Roger Guy English, and his cousin Valerie Mays, walked from La Jolla, California to Vancouver, Canada in hopes of raising environmental awareness about pollution and smog.

=== Great Peace March for Global Nuclear Disarmament ===
In 1986, hundreds of people walked from Los Angeles to Washington DC in what is referred to as the Great Peace March for Global Nuclear Disarmament. The march took nine months to traverse 3,700 miles (6,000 km), advancing approximately fifteen miles per day.

=== A Walk of the People – A Pilgrimage for Life ===
A Walk of the People – A Pilgrimage for Life called for an end to the Cold War with better relations between the U.S. and former Soviet Union. Walkers started at Point Conception, Calif., in 1984 and went through Texas and the Deep South to New York City. A core group of eight flew to Dublin, Ireland, in 1985 and walked to the border of the former East Germany. They obtained visas to Hungary and walked to that border before visiting several cities by train. Some walked to Geneva, Switzerland, then organized a trip to Moscow, Russia, by train.

== Australia ==
Australia has been a host to a number of people who have walked across the country, who have completed the walk as either a personal challenge or to raise funds and awareness for charity.

== Antarctica ==
=== Imperial Trans-Antarctic Expedition ===
The Imperial Trans-Antarctic Expedition was an attempt from 1914 to 1917, to march across Antarctica, and was the last major expedition of the Heroic Age of Antarctic Exploration.

== Europe ==
=== Trans-Europe Foot Race ===
In the Trans-Europe Foot Race, participants cross Europe on foot, although they are mainly running, not walking. It is multiday race, and in 2003 crossed about 3,200 miles (5,100 km) in Europe from Lisbon to Moscow. There were 21 finishers, not counting a wheelchair user. In 2009, it crossed Europe from Bari, Italy, to North Cape, Norway, in 64 days. It had 45 finishers. The participants have support with food, beverages and accommodation. There was also a race in 2012, and another is planned for 2025.

=== European Walks for Peace and Freedom ===
The European Walks for Peace and Freedom (EWPF) were three separate long‑distance expeditions undertaken as part of the Peace Walking project, each forming a distinct survival‑oriented humanitarian journey across the European continent.. Since its creation, Peace Walking has accumulated around 18,000 kilometres on foot, covering 39 countries across Europe (or 40 if the Basque Country is counted as a separate entity) including routes through Scotland and England. These expeditions include:

- EWPF 2016, a survival‑based journey of roughly 3,000 kilometres from Poland to Greece
- EWPF 2017/18, a transformative 6,000‑kilometre pilgrimage from Poland to Portugal
- EWPF 2021/22, the longest expedition, covering around 8,000 kilometres over 14 months through 19 countries while fundraising for Polish Humanitarian Action.
