= Peace Walking =

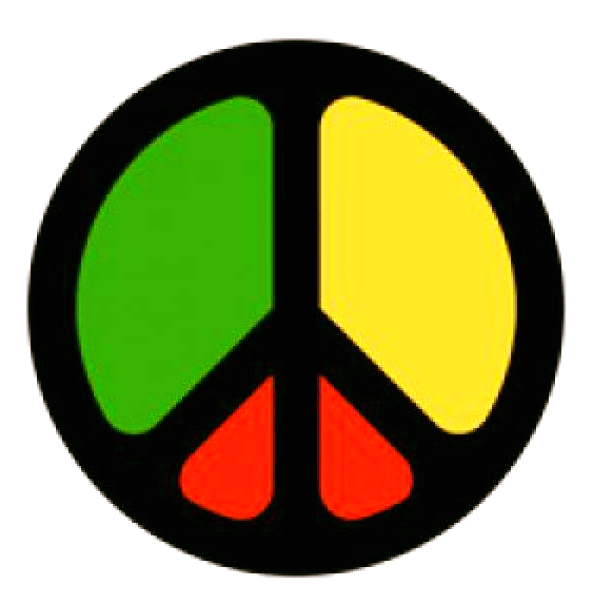
Peace Walking logo.

Peace Walking is a humanitarian, long-distance walking initiative founded by Bartłomiej Jezierski, a polish long‑distance traveller and social activist. Since its creation, Peace Walking has accumulated around 18,000 kilometres on foot, covering 39 countries across Europe (or 40 if the Basque Country is counted as a separate entity) including routes through Scotland and England. The project is based on Jezierski’s survival‑oriented expeditions known collectively as the European Walks for Peace and Freedom (EWPF). Over time, Peace Walking developed into a broader philosophy centred on minimalism, solidarity, intercultural communication, and the transformative and spiritual power of walking. Jezierski’s journeys combine long‑distance travel with humanitarian fundraising, pilgrimage practices, and social engagement.

== Founding Principles and Purpose of Peace Walking ==
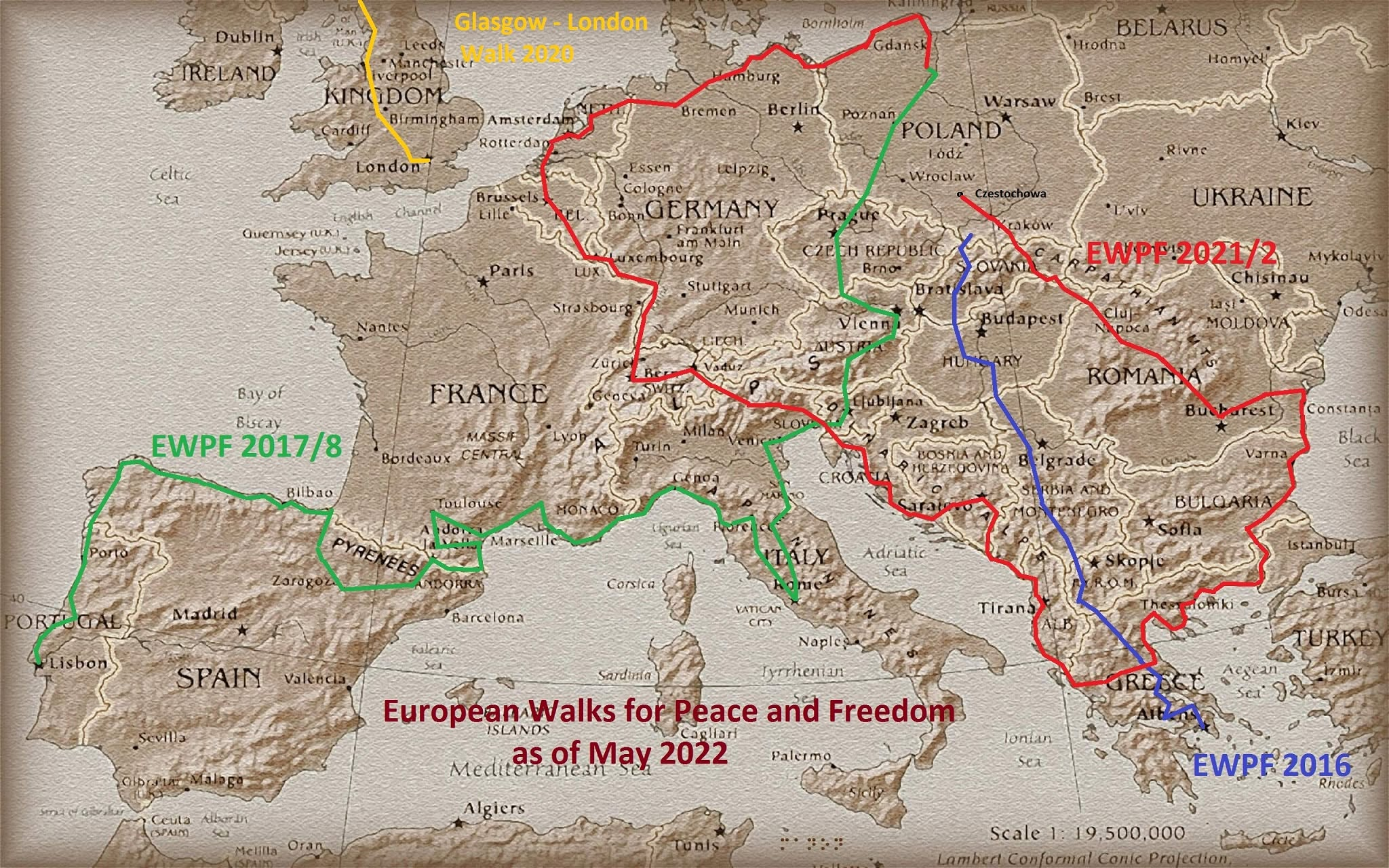
European Walks for Peace and Freedom

Peace Walking was created in 2016 at the University of Glasgow as a humanitarian walking initiative designed to gain direct insight into the realities of irregular migration into Europe. The project arose from the belief that the only honest way to understand the conditions faced by displaced people is to experience elements of their journey personally — without financial security, without organised support, and often outside formal routes.

The founding idea was simple: walk far enough, long enough, and through enough countries to observe the challenges that migrants confront every day. This included moving through remote terrain, sleeping outdoors, illegal border crossings, and functioning with minimal access to food, water, and hygiene.

Peace Walking also emerged from a desire to meet people living without stable homes, to listen to their stories, and to understand the social and emotional weight of displacement. Peace Walking was therefore established as both a humanitarian experiment and a long‑term educational project — a way to expand awareness of migration, homelessness, solidarity, and the human condition through the act of walking, especially throughout the EWPF expedition in 2017–18, when Bart spent extensive time with homeless people of many different nationalities. He lived with them, travelled alongside them, shared daily challenges, and even learned how to beg for money on winter streets. These encounters provided a rare, intimate insight into the realities of life without a home and became one of the most formative elements of Peace Walking’s humanitarian mission.

== European Walks for Peace and Freedom (EWPF) ==
EWPF 2016

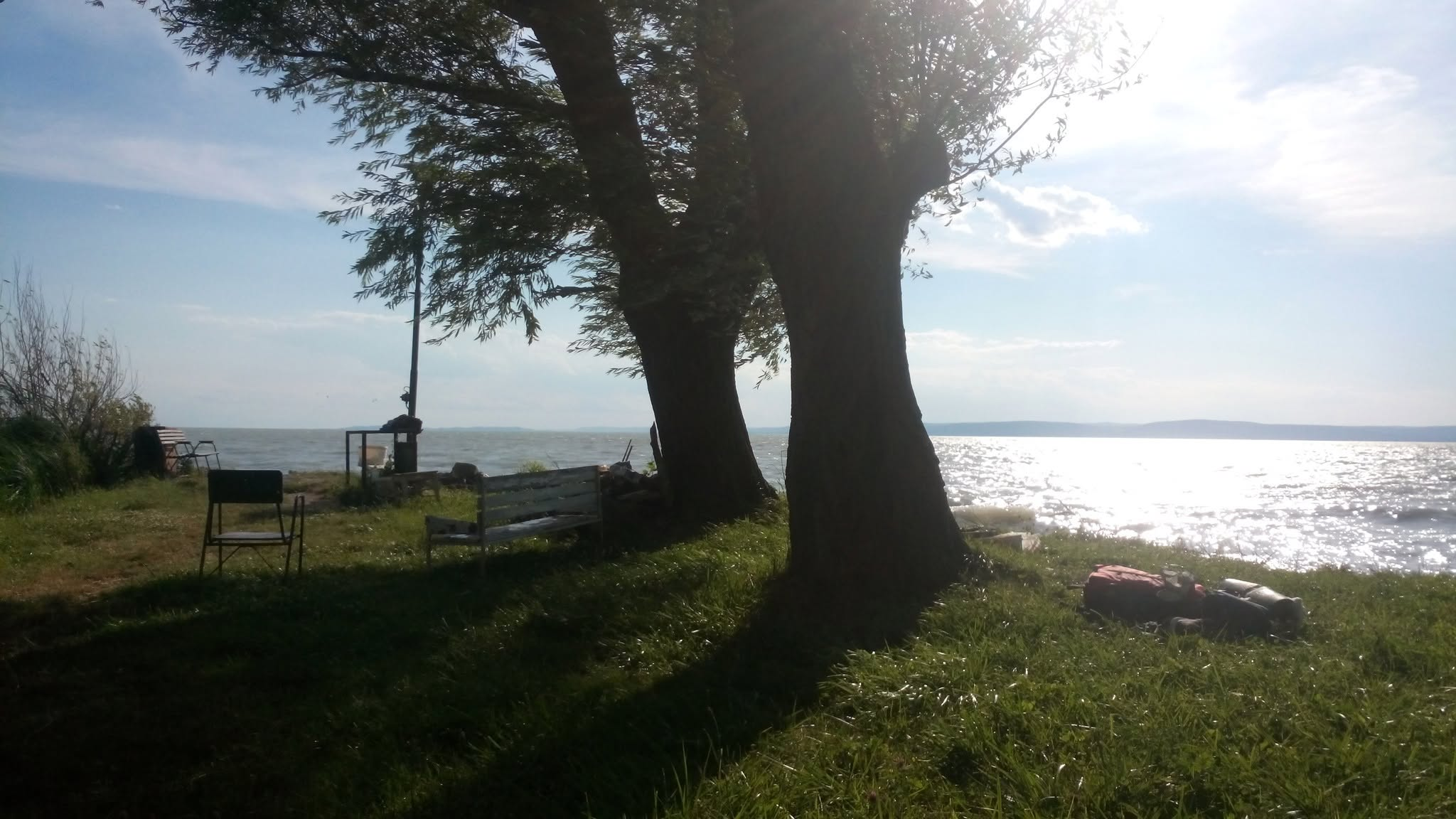
Shores of the Lake Balaton. June 2016. Hungary

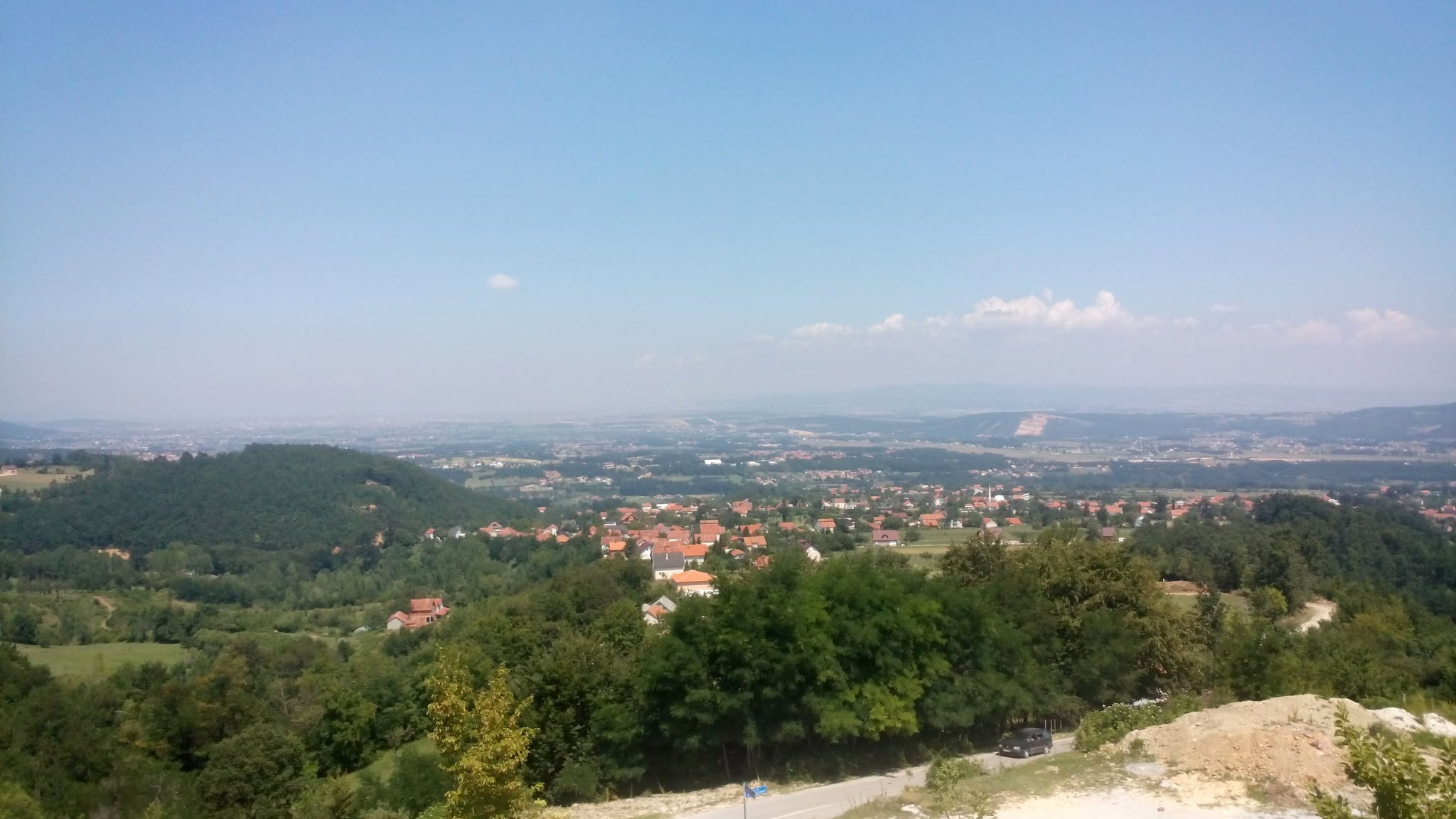
Kosovo Polje. July 2016

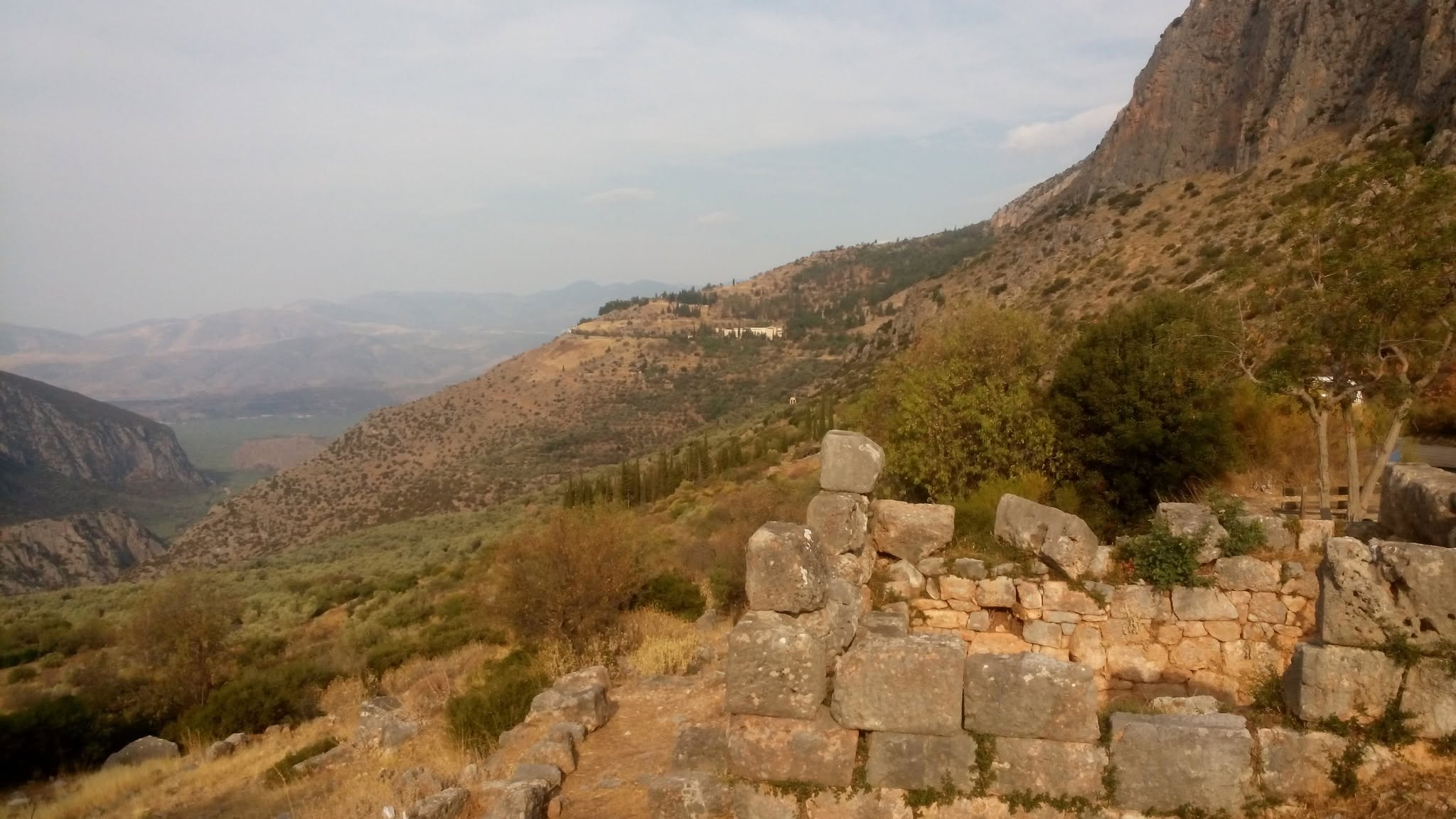
Pleistos River Valley. August 2016. Greece

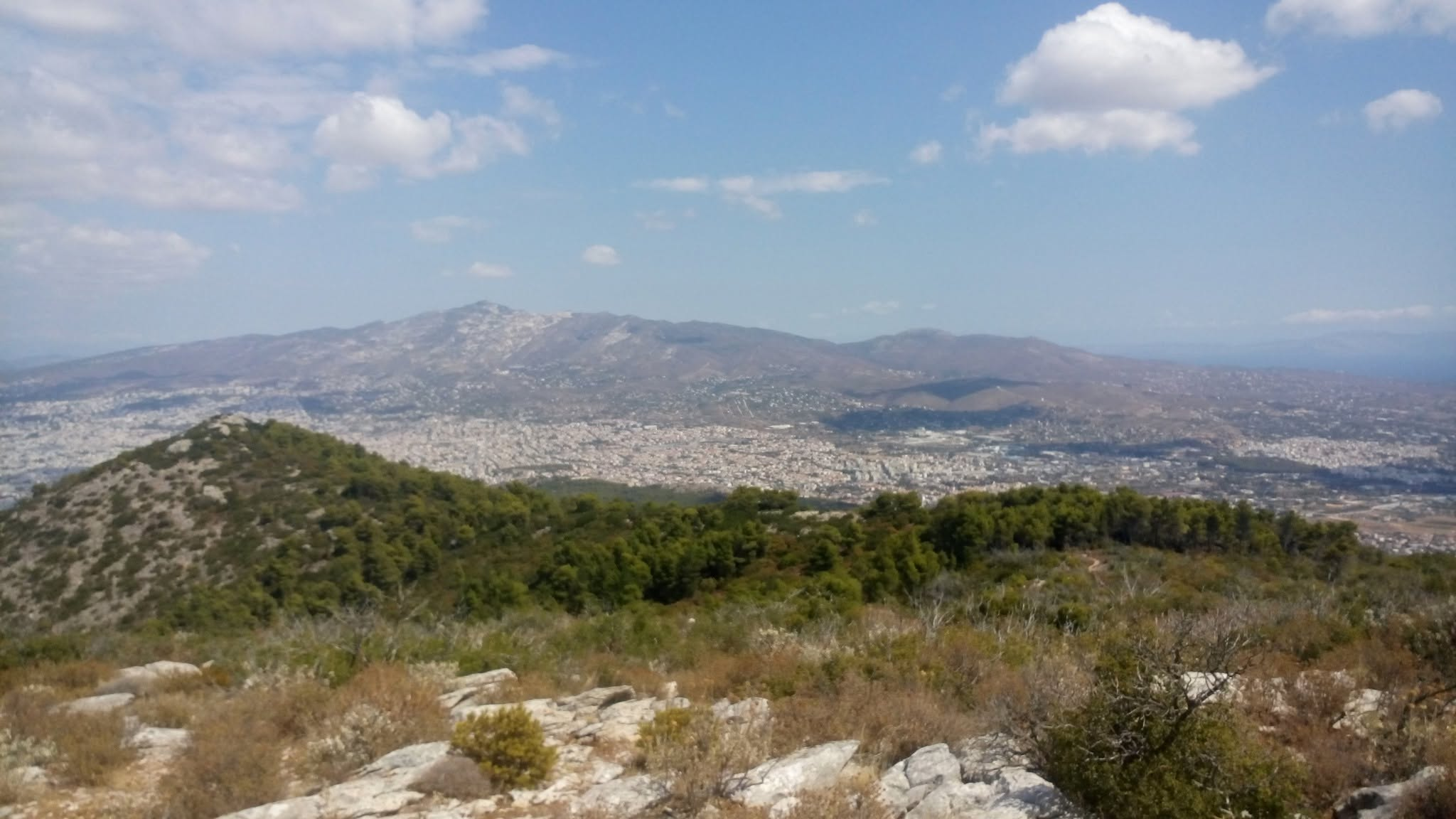
A panoramic view of Athens from the northern boundary mountains. August 2016

The first European Walk for Peace and Freedom took place in 2016. It was a long‑distance survival walk from Bielsko‑Biała in southern Poland to Athens in Greece, passing through multiple Balkan countries such as the Slovakia, Hungary, Serbia, Kosovo, North Macedonia, and Greece. Throughout the journey he did not carry a tent, relying instead on a simple tarp for shelter. He initially used a gas stove and a saucepan, but later depended mainly on fireplaces to prepare meals and hot beverages. During this expedition he travelled approximately 100 kilometres — on the trailer of a military truck with Polish soldiers serving on a NATO mission in Kosovo, on a tractor transporting wheat to a mill and in an ambulance in North Macedonia, and on a superbike in Greece — which means it cannot be classified as a fully continuous walking journey.

The expedition lasted around two and a half months, during which Jezierski walked approximately 3,000 kilometres in 75 days fundraising campaign for UNICEF UK. During the journey, he met groups of migrants, refugees and asylum seekers from Syria, Libya, and Algeria, forming friendships with young men preparing to cross the Serbia–Hungary border illegally, attempting to swim upstream across the Danube River at night. He himself experienced difficulties with Hungarian border police, though as a Polish citizen he was ultimately allowed to continue south. He received hospitality from people of various cultural backgrounds, including Roma communities.

Bart faced several dangerous situations in the mountain regions of Central and Southern Europe. While crossing the Strážov Mountains in Slovakia, he encountered wild bears at close distance. Later in the journey, while walking through Hungary, he developed a severe blister on his foot that significantly limited his mobility, and he struggled to walk for nearly two weeks until the wound healed enough for him to regain normal pace. In the North Macedonia, Bart fell seriously ill and fainted inside a pharmacy after collapsing from exhaustion and fluid loss. He was transported by ambulance to the hospital, but due to the lack of proper insurance he did not receive medical assistance. Left on his own, despite his condition, he continued deeper into the Baba mountains, where local residents provided him with food and water enabling him to regain enough strength to continue his journey.

The expedition had a personal and spiritual impact on him, confronting him with vulnerability, fear, and human fragility. It also revealed solidarity and compassion. These moments consolidated his beliefs and led him to continue his personal mission, shaping Peace Walking into a journey defined not only by distance, but by the human connections formed along the way.

EWPF 2017/18

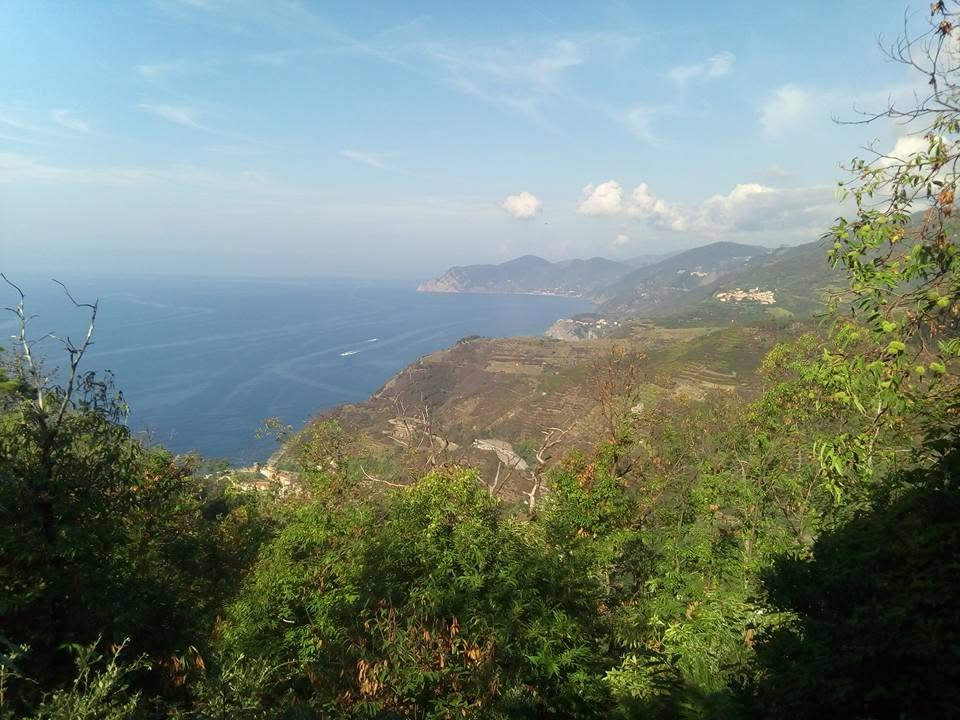
Passage along Italian Riviera towards Genua and Monaco. September 2017

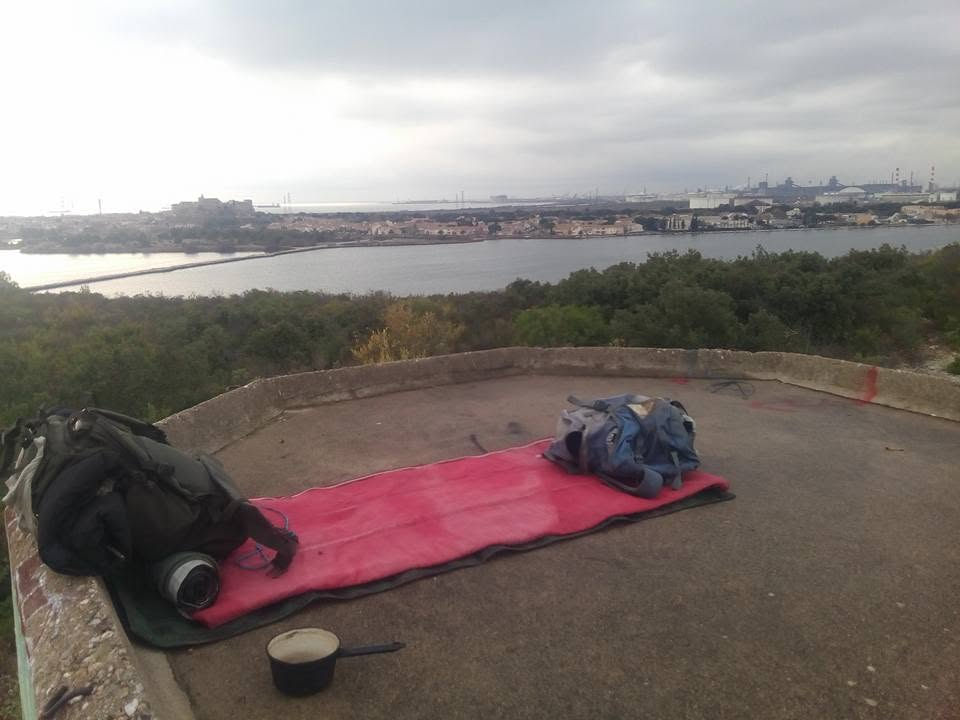
Camping on top of an old bunker in Fos sur Mer. France. November 2017

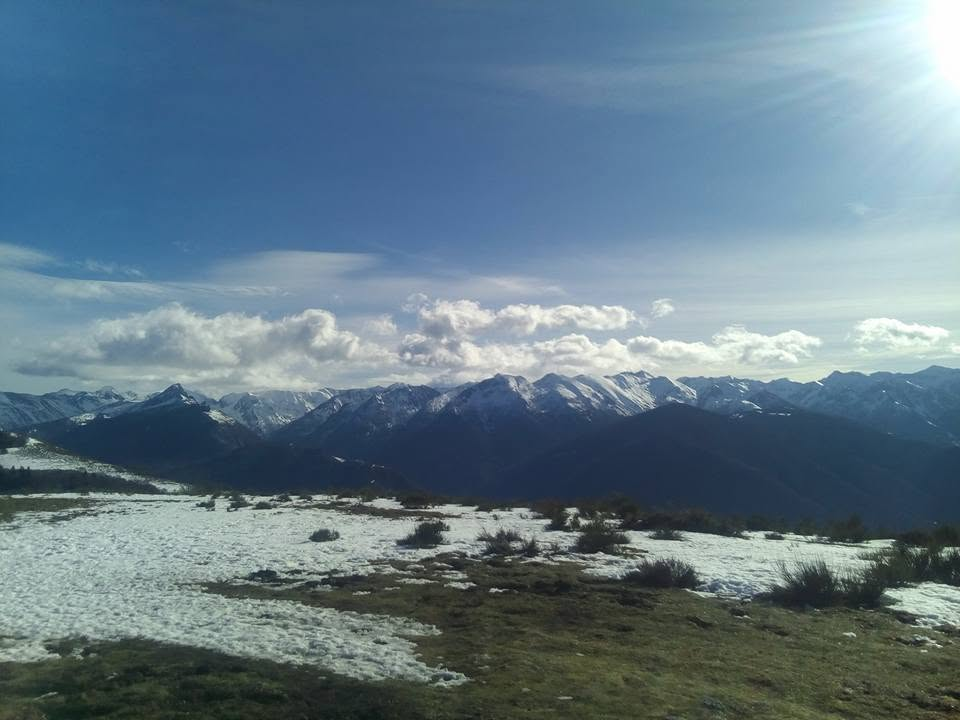
Col du Chioula. France. January 2018

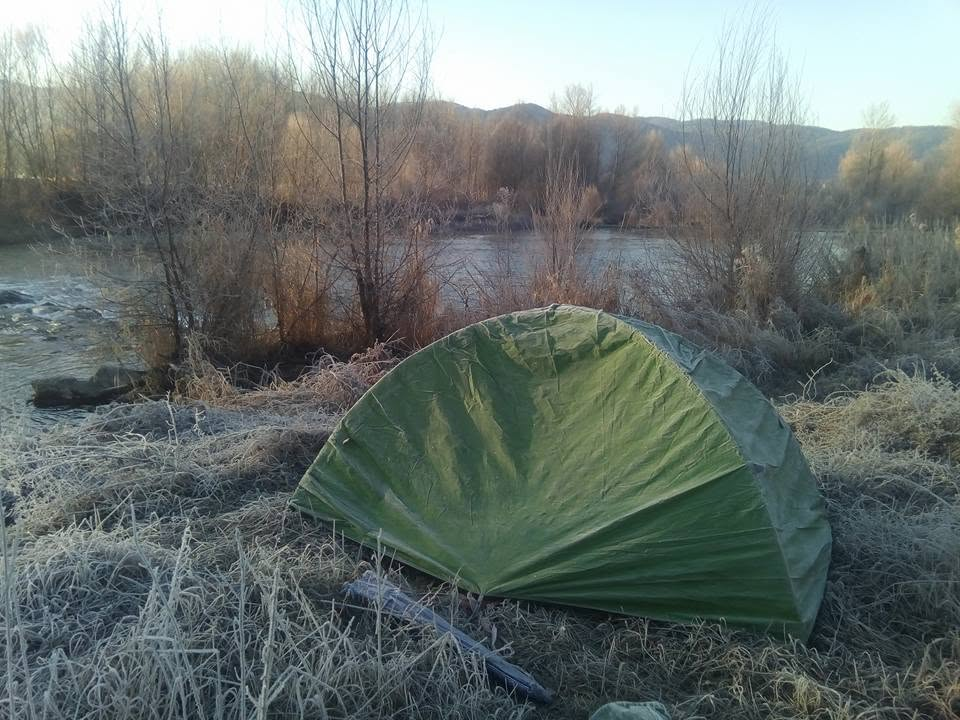
Camping in Pyrénées-Orientales in January 2018

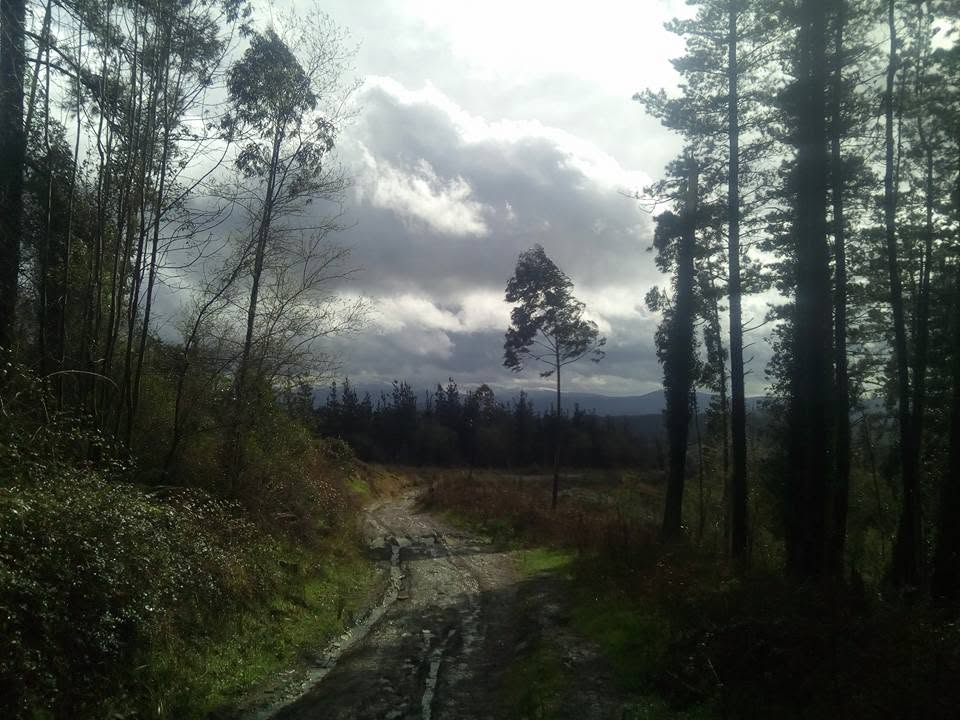
Passing along Cantabrian Mountains. Basque Country. March 2018

After completing his undergraduate studies, Jezierski set out in July 2017 on another long‑distance expedition, which he described as the most transformative adventure of his life. During EWPF 2017/18 he fundraised for Glasgow Children’s Hospital Charity while walking nearly 6,000 kilometres. The route led from Jelenia Góra to Lisbon, and after reaching the final destination, he returned to Poland by plane, hitchhiked back to the exact place where the walk had originally begun, and from there continued on foot northwards across Poland to his hometown Nowe. The entire expedition lasted 352 days and included Poland, Czech Republic, Austria, Slovenia, Italy, San Marino, Vatican City, Monaco, France, Andorra, Spain, the Basque Country, and Portugal. Along the route he visited Pamplona and the campus of University of Navarra where he was camping for several days to regain strength and received the official University Pilgrim Passport deciding to take part in the academic pilgrimage programme walking across Spain along the Northern Way of Saint James. This took him exactly two months to complete and he has reached the Pilgrim’s Office in Santiago de Compostela exactly 300 days after leaving home. During this expedition he travelled approximately 50 kilometres by cars, which means it cannot be classified as a fully continuous walking journey.

Jezierski’s expedition had a deep spiritual dimension, leading him through Assisi, the Vatican, Santiago de Compostela and Fátima, and, fascinated by the architecture and art while walking from church to church, he visited thousands of additional religious sites — sanctuaries, monasteries, chapels, basilicas and cathedrals — significantly extending his route. He met people from diverse backgrounds — migrants, homeless individuals, gangsters, social workers, priests, travellers, artists, tourists, local residents, and members of academic communities such as rector of the University of Oviedo and ex-president of the European Crystallographic Association Santiago García Granda. One of the most memorable encounters occurred in Monaco, where Jezierski unexpectedly stepped onto a pedestrian crossing just as Princess Charlene and her children were approaching in an open‑roof limousine, prompting a brief royal stop and creating a surprisingly humorous moment in the middle of an otherwise ordinary crossing.

Following minimalist principles, he began the journey with a tarp, sleeping mat, a pot, a sleeping bag, a small survival kit, and personal journals. Later he received a simple tent from a Bulgarian traveller in France. He relied on vegetables from fields, wild fruits and herbs, dumpster diving/freeganism, assistance from the Red Cross, and occasional support from people he met along the way. When offered money, he used it sparingly, most often to buy basic items such as coffee, water and bread Later. While passing through Fréjus, Polish people gave him a fishing rod and a sling; However, he used only the fishing rod and eventually discarded both items as unnecessary weight. Cooking on open fire was an essential part of each day as he camped almost exclusively in the wilderness, and daily use of fire became a practical necessity for preparing food, boiling water and staying warm. This occasionally led to encounters with forestry officials, national park rangers and local fire brigades, who were alerted by smoke or reports from passers‑by. Although some interventions were formal, several of these encounters ended amicably and with a group photograph.

The expedition involved extreme conditions: both intense heat and severe cold, with temperatures at times dropping to −30 °C at night, strong winds like Bora and Cierzo, and daily spring rainstorms along the northern Spanish coast. During his crossings through France, on a New Year's Eve, he was detained, beaten and robbed by police officers, an unpleasant incident he later described in his travel notes.

In his forthcoming book “Ludzie Europy”/"The People of Europe" where he describes his struggles against the forces of nature, his own weaknesses, and the people he met along the way. Against this human backdrop, he weaves the histories of the communities living in the regions he crossed, their cultural heritage, and their local legends. The result is a work that blends adventure, history, and psychology into a single epic narrative.

After completing his master’s degree, Jezierski undertook a short Glasgow–London walk 2020 of around 700 kilometres, then returned to Poland to prepare his next mission.

EWPF 2021/22

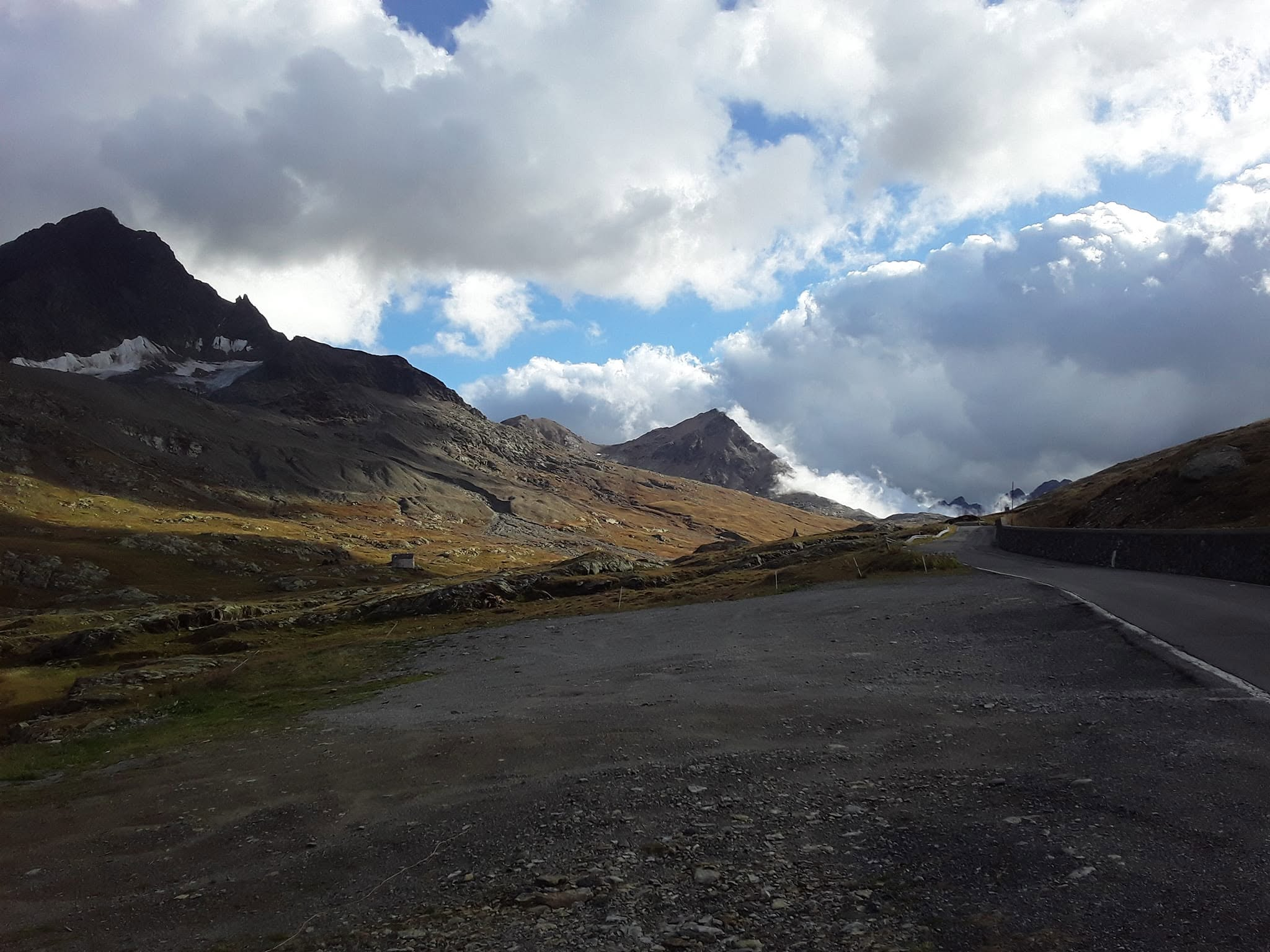
Flüela Pass in the Swiss Alps. September 2021

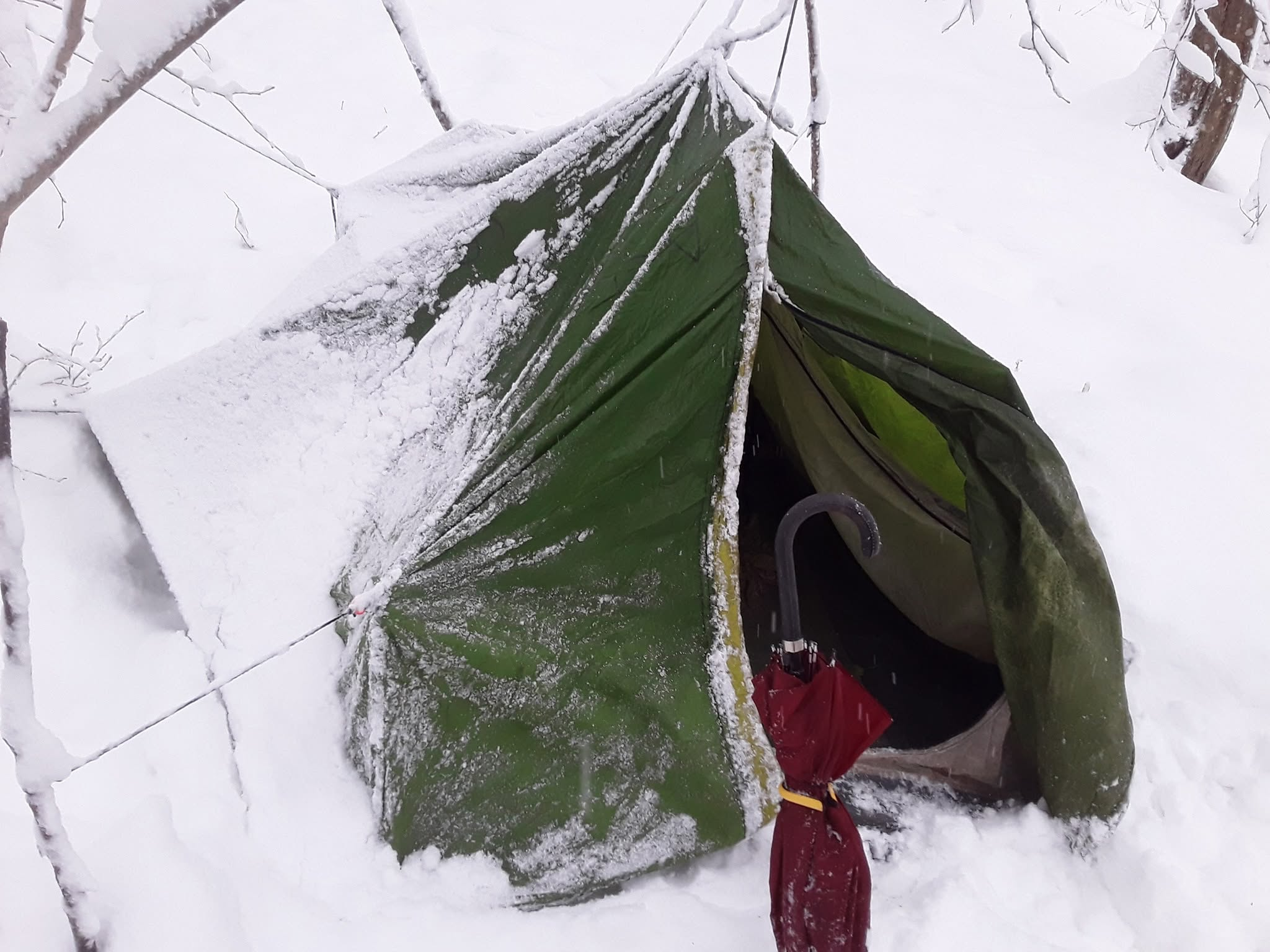
Caught by the snow in Dinaric mountain range. December 2021. Republika Srpska

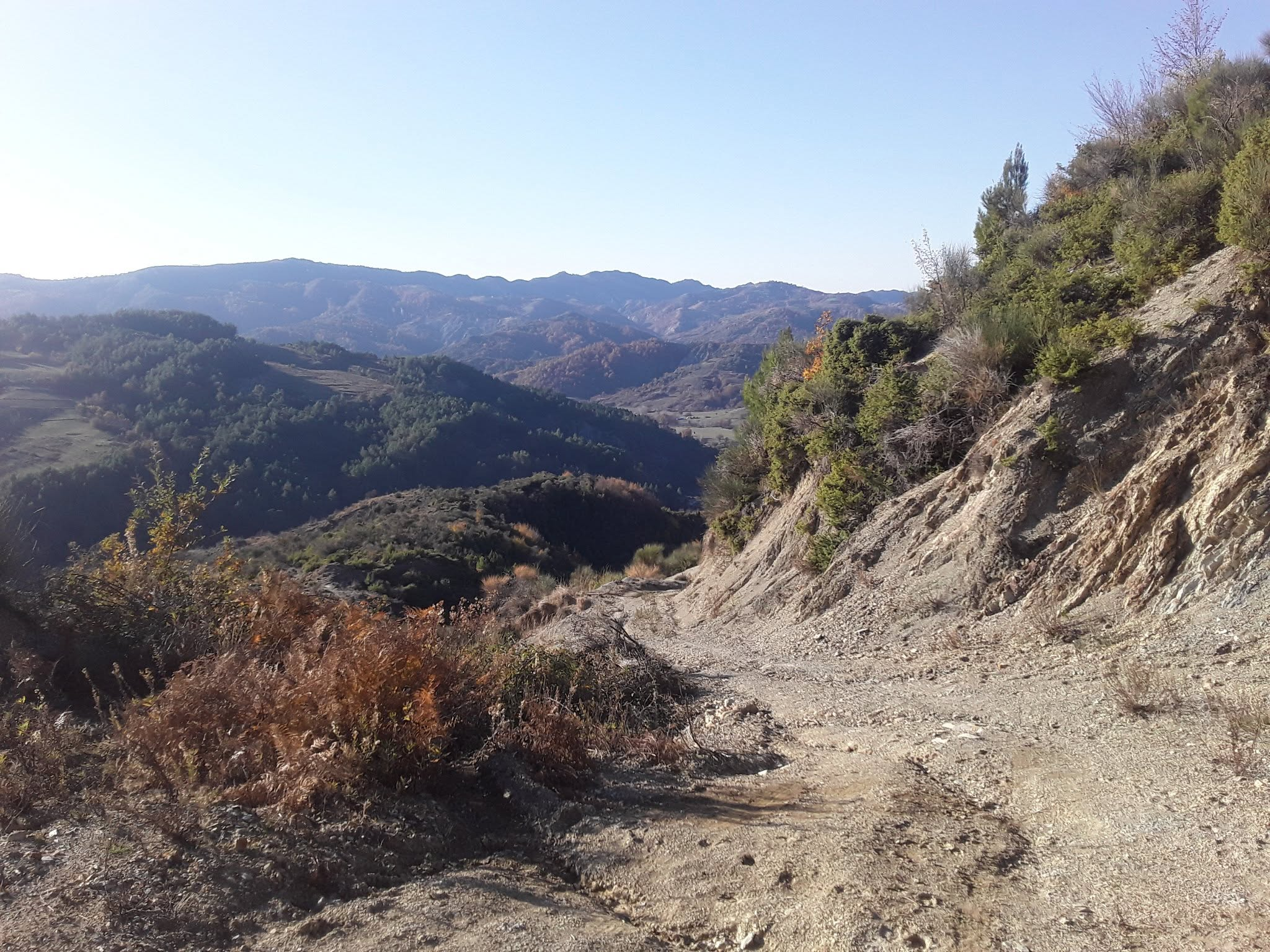
Southernmost extension of the Skanderbeg Mountains, near ancient village of Vrap. Albania. 30th December 2021

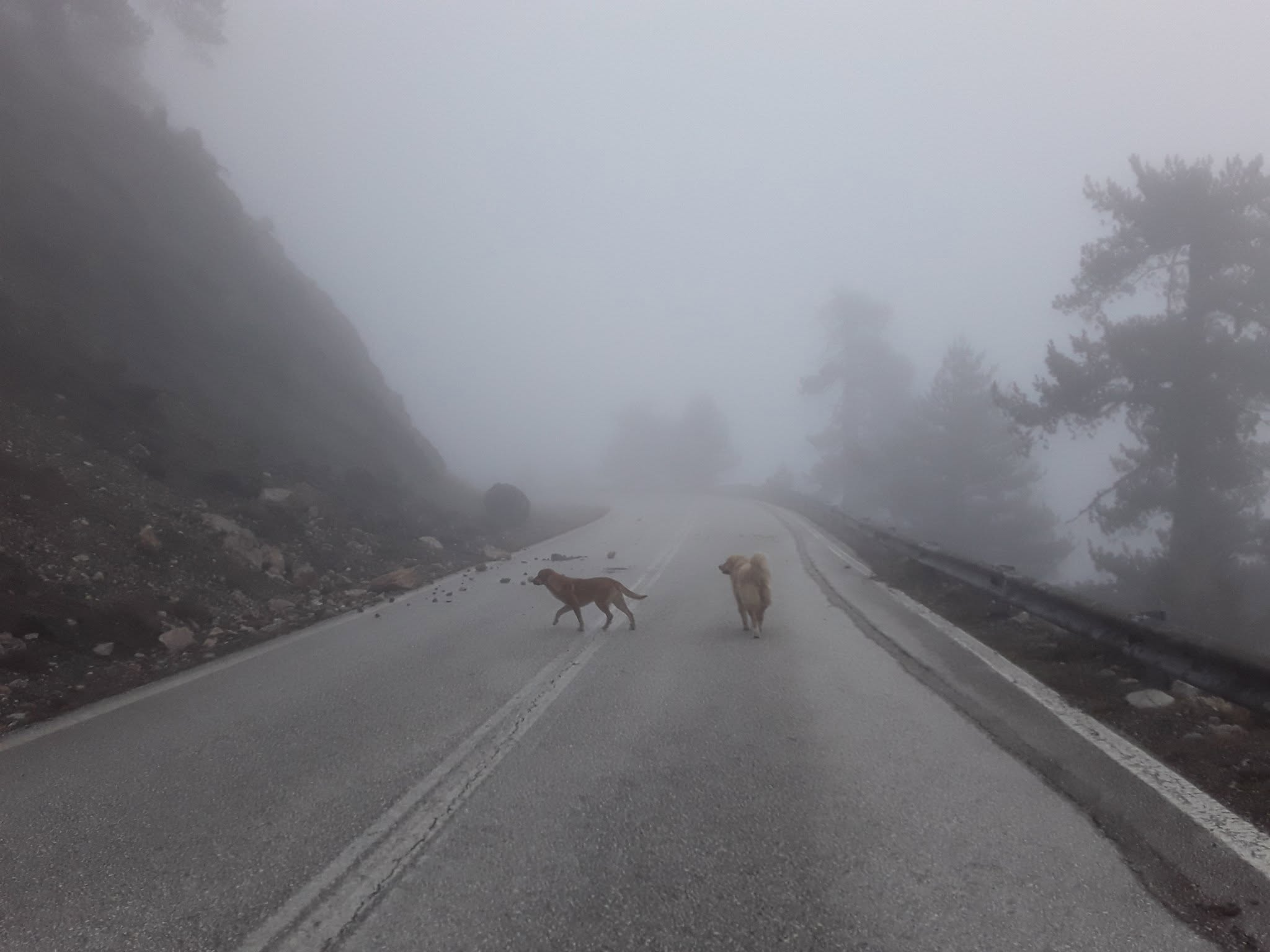
Stray dogs guiding Bart through the mountain pass in the Pindus range. January 2022

This journey became the longest Peace Walking expedition: approximately 8,000 kilometres over 14 months. The route passed through Poland, Germany, the Netherlands, Belgium, Luxembourg, Switzerland, Liechtenstein, Italy, Slovenia, Croatia, Bosnia and Herzegovina, Republika Srpska, Montenegro, Albania, Greece, Bulgaria, Romania, Hungary, and Slovakia fundraising for Polish Humanitarian Action. Bart began the expedition early in March, leaving his hometown with only a 10 PLN banknote (around 2,30 Euro) and a few items from his previous journey, including a saucepan, a tent, a sleeping mat, a basic survival kit and the same army backpack with intention of reaching Africa via Gibraltar. In the west parts of Germany, he visited two old friends and spent five weeks with them before continuing south, where he planned the next stage of the route. He eventually decided to follow the Balkan coast and walk into the Asia via Istanbul and onward to Jerusalem. However, three attempts to leave Greece were unsuccessful due to a strict ban on crossing the Greece–Turkey land border on foot. He then considered travelling through Moldova (including Transnistria) and Ukraine, but Bulgarian security services who stopped him on the way advised against it due to the escalating conflict between Ukraine and Russia. He continued northward back Poland where in Częstochowa he ended the expedition due to extreme exhaustion. During this expedition Jezierski travelled approximately 10 kilometres in a police car, which means it cannot be classified as a fully continuous walking journey.

The Balkan segment was one of the most challenging parts: severe tooth pain caused by a progressing root infection, which he attempted to ease by chewing wild rosemary; encounters with packs of aggressive stray and feral dogs; and harsh weather further shaped his character. Bart was repeatedly stopped by police, most often in the most southern-east parts of Europe and was even detained and fined in Croatia after second illegal passage into this country, and in Romania after unknowingly sleeping on the grounds of a military base near Bucharest. In Sarajevo he stayed for one month at a friend’s flat to recuperate from the difficult passage through Bosnia and Herzegovina, which he completed in persistent rain and cold. Jezierski then resumed the walk at the beginning of December, continuing through the mountains in very harsh winter conditions which he stated nearly cost him his life.

From Metsovo in Greece, two stray dogs — Bruna and Benia — accompanied him. Benia disappeared one night in eastern Greece, while Bruna continued with him all the way to Prešov in Slovakia becoming one of the very few dogs in history to cross such a large number of countries entirely on foot.

During this journey Jezierski fell sick only once, in Belgium, experiencing muscle and joint pain, diarrhoea and fever that required several days of rest in a camp. After regaining strength, he treated himself with a birch inner bark infusion, a method he often used to reduce fever and support recovery. Over the course of the expedition he lost nine kilograms of body mass, two kilograms less than after EWPF 2017/18, and additionally lost a second front tooth and a big toenail. In the final weeks he described feeling like an “old” man — very light, fragile and suffering from persistent knee pain. He fully recovered after a few months. Jezierski later noted that prolonged periods of caloric deficiency had an unexpected effect on his overall well‑being and mental sharpness, and contributed to a noticeably younger appearance, which he interpreted as a positive physiological impact of long‑distance walking.

The stories from EWPF 2021/22, like those from Jezierski’s earlier expeditions, were meticulously recorded in handwritten notebooks which, together with dozens of postcards collected along the way, weighed a couple of kilograms. He carried all of these materials on his back for thousands of kilometres, preserving every detail of the journey despite harsh weather, exhaustion, and constant movement. These notes now form the foundation of his forthcoming book, which is currently in the process of being written.

== Legacy ==
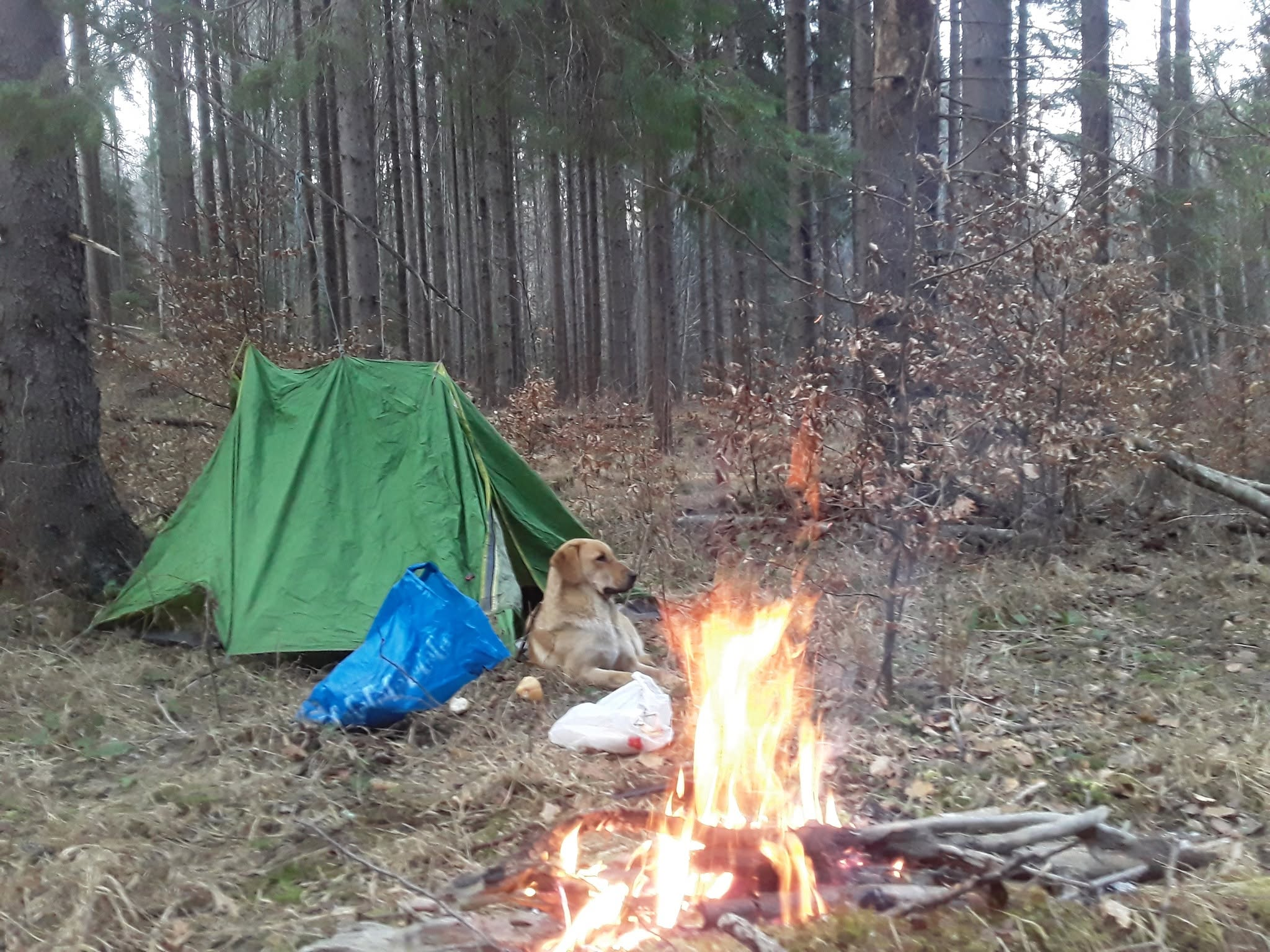
Camping with Bruna in Southern Carpathian mountains. Romania. April 2022

Peace Walking has been recognised by local news and is steadily growing into a foundation built on compassion for those who walk and for those who suffer. Its mission continues to centre on humanitarian fundraising, always directed toward children affected by conflict, disaster, and other traumatic events. As the movement expands, it remains grounded in kindness, solidarity, and the belief that every step can bring hope to those who need it most.

Peace Walking is listed on social media such as Facebook as non-profit organisation which offers thousands of photographs from almost every kilometre walked. The page includes stories, reflections, and moments that were never written down in the notebooks. It serves as a visual archive of the entire project and a living record of the people and places encountered along the way.

== Summary and key insights ==
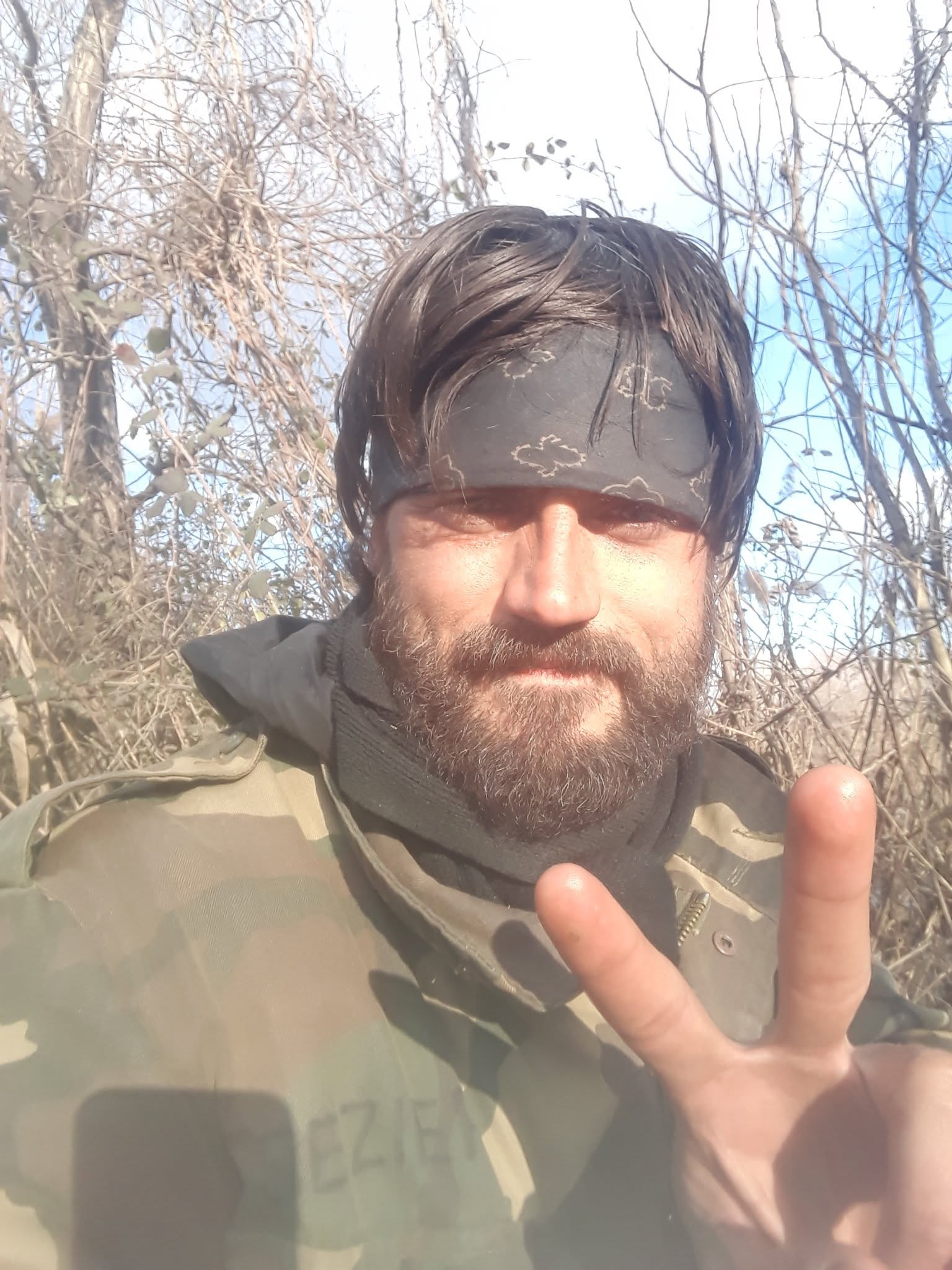
Bartłomiej Jezierski during EWPF 2021/22. Approaching Thessaloniki

Homelessness and irregular migration remain enormous and urgent challenges in Europe, and Peace Walking stresses that they must be openly recognised and discussed if meaningful, compassionate change is ever to take place. During his journeys, Jezierski lived for periods of time alongside people experiencing homelessness and met numerous migrants from Africa and Asia. In his travel notes he described many individuals he encountered as highly capable, multilingual, musically talented or possessing strong practical knowledge and insight. Despite these abilities, he observed that beginning a new life in Europe is often extremely difficult, and he argues that greater support is needed to help people develop their potential.

The project’s core insights come directly from long‑distance, money‑free walking across the continent. They show that another form of understanding arises from experience rather than statistics, and that solidarity requires physical presence, alongside broader support. Walking exposes human vulnerability, reveals social inequalities, and examines how people affected by displacement are perceived.

Living without money uncovers structural barriers and moral blind spots, while long journeys foster emotional clarity and spiritual growth. These experiences suggest that much suffering stems not from poverty itself, but from greed, indifference, and systems built around comfort. Ultimately, the world is simple and beautiful — and many of its complications come from human choices rather than necessity.

== See also ==
- List of longest walks
- Transcontinental walk
