= Walk of the People – A Pilgrimage for Life =

A Walk of the People – A Pilgrimage for Life was a walking personal and political action organized by peace activists Dale James Outhouse and Pamela Blockey O'Brien to bring attention to the perils of impending nuclear war between the United States and the Soviet Union. Former European Parliament member and French Green Party co-founder Solange Fernex was the European organizer of the project.

The peace walk attracted a wide range of support from across the political spectrum. Moderate to liberal President Jimmy Carter and conservative Alabama Gov. George Wallace were among those submitting letters of commendation or welcome. Members met with officials from the Reagan administration at the White House, as well as Democrats such as Rev. Jesse Jackson.

Walkers started on March 1, 1984, from Point Conception, California, and covered about 7,000 miles, ending in Hungary in late 1985 after the former East Germany and other countries denied the group visas to walk. Some members attended the Geneva Summit and arranged a trip to Moscow, Russia, and Warsaw, Poland, via train to meet with officials and others to distribute many letters of peace and other materials they had collected.

== Background ==
In 1984, the global nuclear arms race proceeded at a furious pace. Some United States leaders talked of a winnable nuclear war against the Soviet Union. U.S. President Ronald Reagan and USSR Premier Konstantin Chernenko had not as much as met in the previous four years. More nuclear weapons had been installed in Europe on both sides of the Berlin Wall and Iron Curtain, pointing at each other. Military deployment had escalated along the East-West borders, particularly after the September 1983 Soviet shoot-down of Korean Air Lines Flight 007. Declassified documents published by the National Security Archive in 2013 showed that, behind the scenes, leaders of the U.S. and former Soviet Union drifted the countries closer to nuclear war than anyone previously admitted "through suspicion, belligerent posturing and blind miscalculation."

The Bulletin of the Atomic Scientists set its traditional "Doomsday Clock," which has marked the danger of nuclear war since 1947, to three minutes before midnight in 1984. That was the closest the clock had been to midnight in three decades, with it being at 12 minutes in 1972, when the U.S. and former Soviet Union signed SALT I.

Since political leaders were not even talking, the crucial times demanded extraordinary action from citizens. One method of trying to break through this wall of East-West division was a peace walk through Western and Eastern countries, of which several occurred in the early 1980s. A Walk of the People was the only one to pass through the longer route in the Deep South. It was organized primarily by Outhouse, who had participated in several other long peace marches, and O'Brien, a long-time organizer of peace, human rights, and social justice projects and member of the International Fellowship of Reconciliation. Outhouse was also inspired by Peace Pilgrim, a woman who walked for peace primarily alone for almost three decades.

== Summary of walk events ==
On March 1, 1984, a handful of people started walking from Point Conception. The participants continued through Arizona, New Mexico, Texas, then the Deep South, picking up a few people along the way. Some walked for a few hours, others for a few days or weeks, and a smaller number for several months. By the time the project reached Washington, D.C. in November 1984, the number of core walkers was up to seven, with several other full-timers joining by the time they entered New York City.

Along the way, participants met hundreds of people, including government officials and religious leaders. Besides meeting with Reagan administration officials at the White House, they spoke with representatives of the Soviet, Polish, and East German embassies in Washington, D.C., to lobby for visas to walk. They collected letters, poems, drawings, and other messages of peace from people to distribute to people beyond the Berlin Wall.

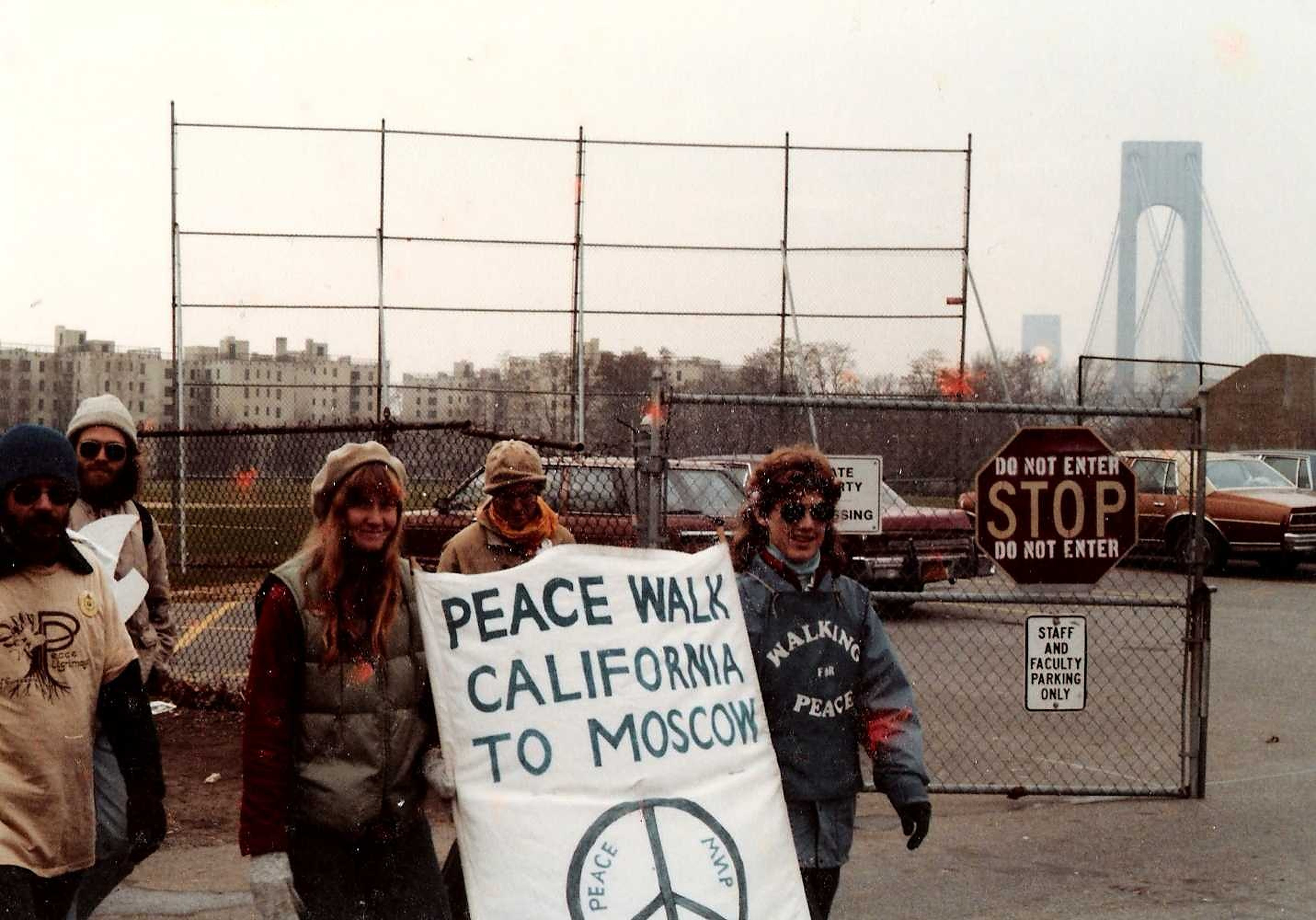
Members of Walk of the People - A Pilgrimage for Life reach New York City in December 1984.

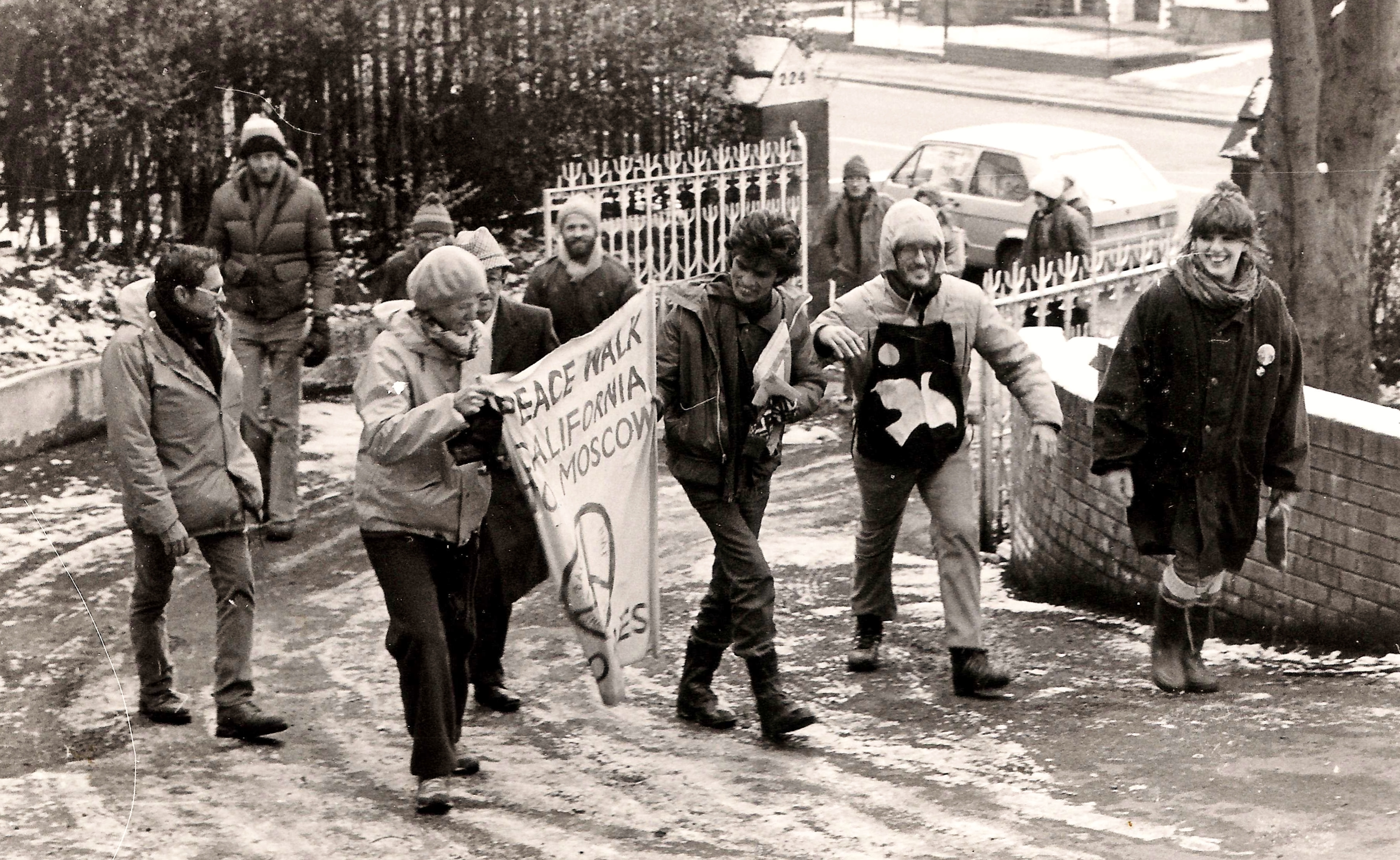
Members of Walk of the People - A Pilgrimage for Life reach Belfast in February 1985.

Members flew to Dublin, Ireland, in January 1985 and walked through Great Britain, France, Belgium, and the former West Germany, meeting political and religious leaders and everyday folks. Several hundred people walked them into Aachen, Germany, in a welcome organized by local Green Party members. They were denied entrance into East Germany in June 1985 and settled in an old mill house in a border town to figure out a plan.

A few weeks later, they walked to Vienna, Austria, then took a train to Budapest and some other cities in Hungary as part of a tour organized by the government's Hungarian Peace Committee. They were turned down again for visas to fly to Moscow. Eventually, several members took a train to Moscow from Geneva, Switzerland, following the November 1985 Geneva Summit between Reagan and Mikhail Gorbachev. They met with members of the Soviet Peace Committee and others, and distributed letters and drawings.

== Impact ==
Many people in Europe wrote to O'Brien to say how much the walk gave them hope and a different perspective of Americans, she said. Some organizers said the project likely made subsequent efforts to break down the Cold War barriers easier to implement in Russia. A 450-mile American-Soviet Peace Walk from Saint Petersburg to Moscow involving about 230 Americans and 200 Russians, which was organized by another group, occurred in 1987. Meeting with high-level Russian officials in Moscow and Geneva for several hours showed that "behind the scenes you were taken a lot more seriously than (Russian officials) were willing to admit," O'Brien said.

The project raised much awareness through the media. The walk was covered by hundreds of newspapers, radio stations, and television stations in the U.S. and Europe, from CNN and The Associated Press, to national television in France, Germany, and other countries. Many people heard about the march and said it inspired them to work more diligently for peace.

Numerous political, religious and peace movement leaders were touched enough to write letters of support or welcome. Former New York Gov. Mario Cuomo wrote three times on the walk’s behalf, and former President Jimmy Carter wrote twice. Besides Gov. George Wallace, others who wrote letters or endorsed the project included:

- Rev. C.T. Vivian, civil rights leader, Presidential Medal of Freedom recipient
- Ron Dellums, former Oakland mayor, U.S. House of Representatives member
- Texas Gov. Mark White
- North Carolina Gov. Jim Hunt
- Georgia Gov. Joe Frank Harris
- Louisiana Gov. Edwin Edwards
- New Mexico Gov. Toney Anaya
- Arizona Gov. Bruce Babbitt
- South Carolina Gov. Richard Riley
- Maryland Gov. Harry Hughes
- Washington, D.C., Mayor Marion Barry
- Delaware Gov. Pete du Pont and Rep. Tom Carper
- New Jersey Gov. Thomas Kean
- Houston Mayor Kathryn Whitmire
- Philadelphia Mayor Wilson Goode
- New Orleans Mayor Ernest Morial
- Santa Cruz Mayor John Laird
- Tempe Mayor Harry Mitchell
- Princeton Mayor Barbara Sigmund
- Catholic Bishop Nicholas D'Antonio Salza
- Episcopal Bishop C. Judson Child Jr.
- Richard Barnet, author, co-founder Institute for Policy Studies
- Uwe Lichtenberg, Fürth, Germany, Mayor
- Michael O'Halloran, Lord Mayor of Dublin, Ireland
- Raymond Yans, Liège, Belgium, Deputy Mayor
- Rev. Richard Deats, executive secretary, Fellowship of Reconciliation
- Rev. Kenneth Kinnett, Episcopal Church of the Covenant
- Howard Frazier, executive director, Promoting Enduring Peace

== Aftermath ==
Some participants continued to join similar projects, including the Great Peace March for Global Nuclear Disarmament and an international peace walk organized by world-wide walker Prem Kumar in India in 1987-88. Kumar walked with Walk of the People for a few weeks in Ireland and the United Kingdom in the midst of his 10,500-mile, four-year journey.

As the Berlin Wall fell and the Soviet Union dissolved, the "Doomsday Clock" rose to 17 minutes by 1991. But it has since gone down to less than two minutes, as of 2020.

One participant, journalist Kevin James Shay, wrote a book about the inside story of the project called Walking through the Wall. The book won a 2002 International PeaceWriting Award, sponsored by the OMNI Center for Peace, Justice and Ecology of Fayetteville, Arkansas, and the Peace and Justice Studies Association of Georgetown University. Shay donated many of his papers from the project to Swarthmore College.

== Similar group peace walks ==
Many similarly-long peace walks involving a group have occurred before and after A Walk of the People. The following are a few:

- San Francisco to Moscow Walk for Peace, 1960-61. Organized by the Committee for Non-Violent Action, about 16 people started from San Francisco and walked to New York in six months. More people joined in Europe, and the project, led by pacifist leaders A.J. Muste and Bradford Lyttle, covered some 5,900 miles in just ten months. Unlike numerous projects, they were able to walk through Russia.
- The Longest Walk, 1978, Long Walk for Survival, 1980. These Native American-led projects from California to Washington, D.C., raised awareness for environmental issues and protection of native sites.
- A Walk to Moscow, 1981-83. This peace walk originated from a shorter project along the West coast from Santa Cruz, Calif., to Bangor, Wash., in 1980. Some members rested there for a few months, then continued across the country, staying in Boston for the winter of 1981-82. Walkers trekked across the United Kingdom, France, Belgium and the former West Germany, before having to stop for nine months in a border village to negotiate for visas to walk in Czechoslovakia and Poland. Some also traveled to cities in Russia by train.
- Bethlehem Peace Pilgrimage, 1982-83. This 6,500-mile walk from Seattle to Israel was led by Jesuit Fr. Jack Morris and Fr. George Zabelka, the pastor for the airmen who dropped the atomic bombs on Japan.
- Peace Pilgrimage of Europeans, 1984. European and American peace activists walked from Bangor to D.C., where they displayed an amazing chain of about 10,000 photographs around the Lincoln Memorial pool showing the massive number of people protesting missiles in Germany.
- On the Line, 1984. Walkers traced the route of trains carrying nuclear weapons from Bangor to Charleston, S.C.
- Great Peace March for Global Nuclear Disarmament, 1986. About 1,200 long-term walkers began from Los Angeles, but they bogged down two weeks later in the desert under internal and financial problems. Some 500 marchers reorganized and continued to walk, with about 400 of those making it all the way to D.C. and several hundred more joining for the final leg. Some kept going in Europe and were part of the Soviet-American walk in Russia in 1987.
- International Walk in India, 1987-88. Several hundred people walked 600 miles from Ahmedabad, India, to New Delhi for peace and rural development. The project was organized by Friends of All, an organization founded by Prem Kumar.
- Interfaith Pilgrimage for Peace and Life, 1994-95. Led by Nipponzan-Myōhōji-Daisanga Japanese Buddhist monks, this walk started in Auschwitz, Poland, and ended in Nagasaki, Japan. More than 1,000 people joined at various times along the 3,000-mile walk that passed through war zones in Bosnia, as well as troubled parts of Israel, the West Bank, Jordan, Iraq, Cambodia, Vietnam and the Philippines.
- Peace by Peace, 2002. A group of women inspired by Peace Pilgrim walked about 3,500 miles from Berkeley, Calif., to D.C.
