= Bradford Lyttle =

American peace activist and perennial candidate (born 1927)

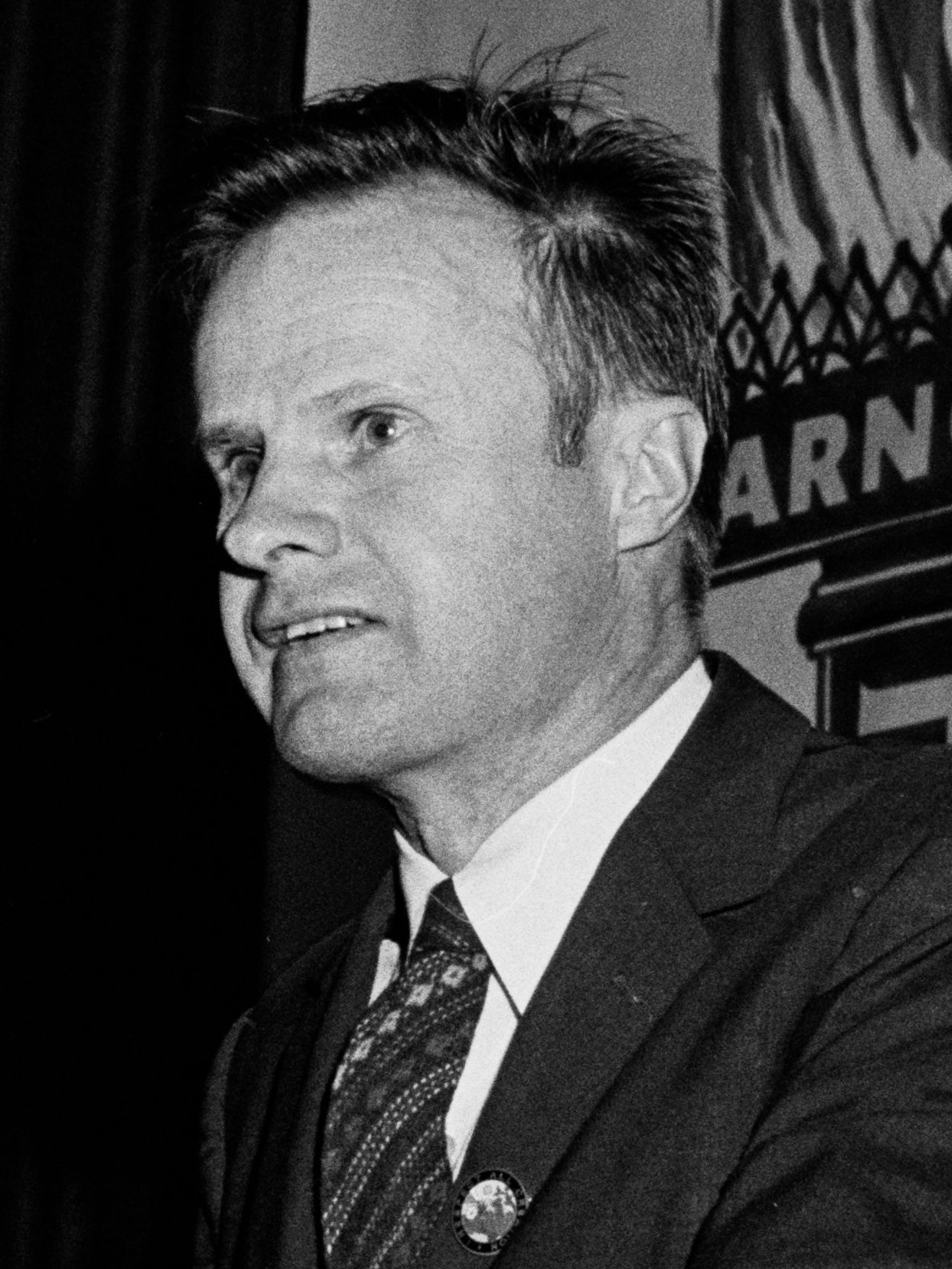
- Lyttle in 1974

Personal details
- Born: November 20, 1927 (age 98) Chicago, Illinois, U.S.
- Party: United States Pacifist Party
- Website: www.uspacifistparty.org/

Bradford Lyttle (born November 20, 1927) is an American pacifist and peace activist. He was an organizer with the Committee for Non-Violent Action of several major campaigns against militarism, including "Omaha Action", against land-based nuclear missiles (1959) and "Polaris Action" against submarine-based nuclear missiles (1960). Lyttle and several others walked from San Francisco to New York City, and then through parts of Europe to Moscow, Russia, from December 1960 until late 1961. The action was called the San Francisco to Moscow March for Peace. Several participants, including Lyttle, walked the entire distance. He also walked in the Quebec-Washington-Guantanamo Peace Walk (1963).

In 1965, Lyttle gave lectures on 'Non-Violent resistance' for the newly founded Free University of New York.

Among his theoretical works are a 1958 pamphlet presenting the case for nonviolent national defense against aggression; and a mathematical formula called "The Apocalypse Equation", which argues that, over time, the probability of nuclear missiles being used approaches 100%. Lyttle claimed that a University of Chicago statistician had checked his work on the "Apocalypse Equation." In Note 21 to his Presidential Address to the American Statistical Association published in 1988, University of Chicago Statistics Professor William Kruskal mentions Lyttle's "Apocalypse Equation" as an example of the error of casually assuming the independence of events when calculating the probability of a resultant event over time, as an example which "stretches to the limit … the appropriateness of probabilistic data."

He is also the founder and perennial candidate for the office of President of the United States of the United States Pacifist Party. He ran as a write-in candidate in the 1984, 1996, and 2000 elections, and on the ballot in the state of Colorado in 2008. In 2008, Lyttle came in second to last of 16 candidates in Colorado, for which he received 110 votes, beating only Gene Amondson of the Prohibition Party. In Colorado, Amondson came in last place among all candidates with ballot access (though Amondson won enough votes elsewhere to surpass Lyttle's total nationally).

Lyttle has been arrested for nonviolent peaceful demonstrations many times. In 1996, Lyttle, Chicago 7 defendant David Dellinger, Abbie Hoffman's son, Andrew, and Civil Rights Movement historian Randy Kryn were among eleven people arrested for a sit-in at the Chicago Federal Building during the first Democratic National Convention held in Chicago since 1968.

== Works ==
- National Defense Thru Nonviolent Resistance (1958)
- Essays on Nonviolent Action (1959)
- Peace and independence for South Vietnam: By nonviolent resistance or guerilla warfare? (1965)
- You Come With Naked Hands: The Story of the San Francisco to Moscow March for Peace (1966)
- The Chicago Anti-Vietnam War Movement (1988)
- Peace Activist: The Autobiography of Bradford Lyttle (Kindle Edition 2014)
- The Flaw in Deterrence (2017)

== See also ==
- List of peace activists
