= List of people who have run across Australia =

Location of Australia

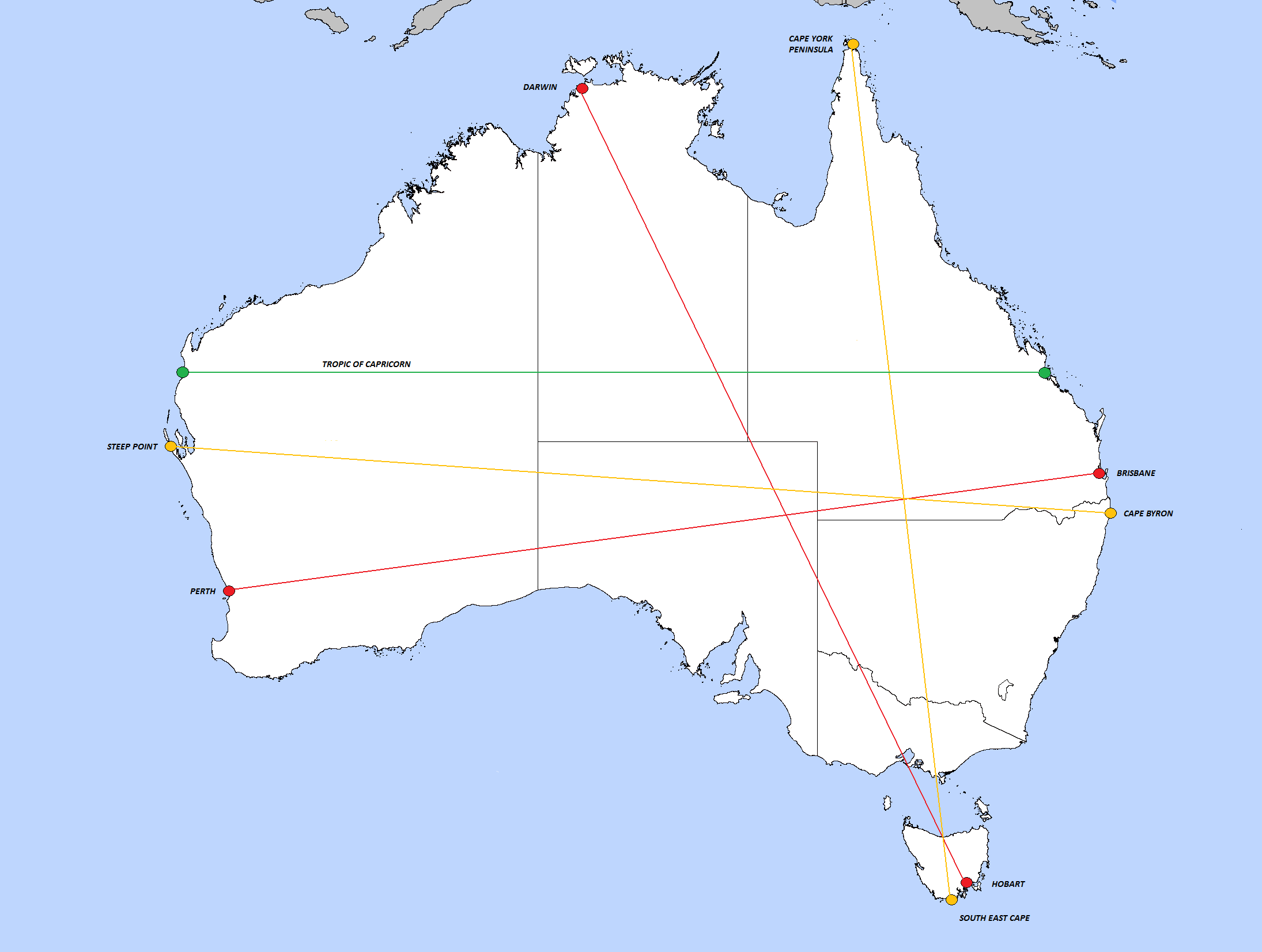
Map depicting the geographical extremes of Australia, and the cities at each point of the compass

People who choose to run across Australia can choose to run from either of the geographical extremes of the continent, or from directly opposed cities on opposite shores. The westernmost geographical extreme of Australia is Steep Point, whereas the easternmost extreme is Cape Byron. Similarly, the northernmost geographical extreme is Cape York Peninsula, and the southernmost is the South East Cape. The distance between the east and west as the crow flies is 4,000 km (2,500 mi), or 3,860 km (2,400 mi) from north to south†. The westernmost capital city in Australia is Perth, and the easternmost capital city is Brisbane. The northernmost city is Darwin, and the southern to the southernmost city is Hobart.

Runners who choose to circumambulate Australia can follow the National Highway for large sections of their journey. Distances involved are in the vicinity of 14,300 km (8,900 mi) depending on the route taken.

†Distance calculated utilising the resources of Geoscience Australia.

== Completed journeys ==
The names of the individuals who have run across Australia have been listed below in chronological order. Sources for data contained within this table have been listed within the body of the article.

Name	Nationality	Start date	Finish date	Duration	Starting location	Finishing location
George Perdon	Australia	August 1973	September 1973	47 days	Fremantle	Sydney
Tony Rafferty	Australia	August 1973	October 1973	74 days	Fremantle	Gold Coast
Ron Grant	Australia	1983	1984	217 days	Brisbane	Brisbane
Sarah Covington Fulcher	United States	22 September 1986	26 December 1986	96 days	Bondi Beach	Fremantle (Perth)
Robert Garside	England	unknown	unknown	unknown	unknown	unknown
Serge Girard	France	24 September 1999	9 November 1999	47 days	Perth	Sydney
Pat Farmer	Australia	1999	unknown	unknown days	Syd	Syd Including Tas
Jesper Olsen	Denmark	31 October 2004	11 February 2005	104 days	Sydney	Perth
Achim Heukemes	Germany	2 April 2005	14 May 2005	43 days	Fremantle	Sydney
Deborah De Williams	Australia	27 March 2010	8 May 2011	408 days	Hobart	Hobart Inc Mainland
Remi Camus	France	15 October 2011	19 March 2012	100 days	Melbourne	Darwin
Cesar Guarin	Philippines	31 October 2011	6 December 2011	37 days	Melbourne	Brisbane
Patrick Malandain	France	13 October 2013	20 November 2013	38 days	Sydney	Fremantle
Janette Murray-Wakelin and Alan Murray	Australia	1 Jan 2013	1 Jan 2014	366 days	Melb	Melb Inc Tas
Tom Denniss	Australia	June 2013	September 2013	97 days	Cottesloe	Sydney via Melbourne
Mark Allison	UK	October 2013	January 2014	82 days	Perth	Shellharbour
James Brooman	UK	March 2015	May 2015	81 days	Perth	Sydney
Dave Alley	Australia	19 April 2015	11 October 2015	175 days	Lismore Oval, NSW	Lismore Oval, NSW
Jason P. Lester	United States	March 2016	August 2016	118 days	Scarborough Beach	Batemans Bay
Richard Bowles	UK	1 June 2012	1 September	457 days	Healesville, VIC	Cooktown, QLD
Nedd Brockmann	Australia	1 September 2022	17 October 2022	46 days	Cottesloe Beach, WA	Bondi Beach, Sydney
Nikki Love	UK	1 May 2023	16 July 2023	77 days	Cottesloe Beach, WA	Bondi Beach, Sydney
Guy Schweitzer	Australia	28 May 2023	13 August 2023	78 days	Port Hedland, WA	Scarborough, QLD
Chris Turnbull	Australia	8 August 2023	16 September 2023	39 days	Cottesloe Beach, WA	Manly Beach, NSW
Lachlan and Stefan Lamble	Australia	11 February 2024	9 May 2024	85 days	Perth Stadium, Perth	Catani Gardens, St Kilda
Sean Bell	Australia	10 March 2024	22 August 2024	165 days	Melbourne Cricket Ground (MCG), Melbourne	Melbourne Cricket Ground (MCG), Melbourne
Chad Aziz	Australia	20 May 2026	21 July 2026	62 days	Cottesloe Beach, WA	Bondi Beach, Sydney

=== George Perdon ===
George Perdon ran across Australia during the 1973 Trans-Continental Run, completing the 4,807 km (2,987 mi) journey in 47 days, 1 hour and 54 minutes. He averaged 100 km (62 mi) per day, and set records for 1,000 miles (1,600 km), 1,500 miles (2,400 km), 2,000 miles (3,200 km) and 2,600 miles (4,200 km).

Perdon became a household name in 1973 when competing in the 1973 Trans Australia race and racing his rival, Tony Rafferty. Perdon was unable to get time off work at the appropriate time and missed the official start, giving Rafferty one week's head start before heading off from Fremantle. Perdon was to end up beating Rafferty into Sydney by a day. They took slightly different routes during the run, causing the run to generate front-page headlines for a majority of the journey.

Perdon died on 29 June 1993.

=== Tony Rafferty ===
In 1972, Tony Rafferty became the first man to run from Melbourne to Sydney, pioneering ultra-distance running in Australia. He was also the first man to run from Perth to Adelaide, Adelaide to Brisbane, Melbourne to Brisbane and Sydney to Brisbane. In 1978, he became the first man to run from Melbourne to Sydney and return. In August to October 1973 Tony became the first person to run from Fremantle to the Gold Coast, and in the process became the first person to run across the Nullarbor Plain. He completed the run in 74 days.

Tony has received many commendations for his achievements. Most notably, he was a Torch Bearer for the Sydney 2000 Olympic Games, and the recipient of the Medal of the Order of Australia (OAM) in 2002 for services to Ultramarathon Running and the promotion of Community Fitness.

=== Ron Grant ===
In 1983, Ron Grant ran 13,383 km (8,316 mi) around Australia in 217 days. Ron completed the run in an anticlockwise direction. Starting in Brisbane, he then proceeded to Townsville, Mt Isa, Darwin, Perth, Adelaide, Melbourne, Sydney, then back to Brisbane. He maintained an overall daily average of 61.67 km (38.32 mi), and was the first person to do it solo. Soon after this achievement, he was awarded the Queensland Sportsman of the year Award in 1983, Queenslander of the Year in 1984, and the Order of Australia in 1984.

=== Sarah Covington Fulcher ===
The first woman to run across Australia, at age 24, from North Carolina, US, running 2,727 miles (4,389 km) east to west from Bondi Beach, NSW, to the western suburbs of Perth, Western Australia, 22 Sep to 26 Dec 1986. Fulcher describes her journey through remote areas in an interview with Bryant Gumbel on NBC's Today Show. "Sarah Fulcher set her incredible record one marathon at a time. It was an unparalleled feat that will take a heck of a commitment to beat. During her record run, Fulcher averaged 10 minutes per mile." "This would also make her the youngest person (at that time) to make any transcontinental run."

Sarah also set the Guinness world record for longest continuous solo run with a distance of 11,134 miles (17,918 km) in 438 days. "Sarah Fulcher, an attractive, brightly-smiling, 25-year-old native of Winston Salem, N. C., jogged through Sequin this week on her way back to Laguna Hills, Calif., near Los Angeles, from where she began her 11,000 mile run...the world's longest, continuous solo run in history. "Fulcher has been recognized by untold news organizations and government organizations including the Connecticut General Assembly Permanent Committee on the Status of Women's (CTPCSW) publication Selected Highlights of Women's History (page 38) and the United States Congressional Record in a "Salute to Sarah Covington Fulcher".

=== Robert Garside ===
Robert Garside is a British runner who ran through 29 countries on six different continents covering more than 48,000 km (29,826 mi) and covering a period of 2,062 days. He started and finished in New Delhi on 20 October 1997, and finished on 13 June 2003. He had completed his Australian leg of the run by April 2000.

=== Serge Girard ===
Serge Girard ran from Perth to Sydney in 1999, covering a distance of 3,755 km (2,333 mi) in 46 days, 23 hours, 12 min and setting a world record in the process. The world record remained intact until beaten by Achim Heukemes in 2005.

=== Pat Farmer ===
Pat Farmer established the fastest around Australia long run record of continuous running in 191 days and 10 minutes (around 6 months) over 14,662.4 km (9,111 mi) during his Centenary of Federation run. He set a new world 10,000 km (6,214 mi) record in 129 days, broke a long-standing Australian record of more than 13,383 km (8,316 mi) in 174 days. He set a total of ten international records including the Western Australia border to border run, the Brisbane to Darwin run, and the world record for the longest tropics run (6,307 km (3,919 mi) in 83 days).

=== Jesper Olsen ===
Jesper Olsen is a Danish marathon runner who ran across Australia as part of his first journey around the world. He departed from Sydney on 31 October 2004, and arrived in Perth on 11 February 2005. He completed the journey in 104 days, before proceeding onto Los Angeles to complete the American leg of his run around the world.

=== Achim Heukemes ===
Achim Heukemes (born 1951 in Wuppertal, Germany) is an ultramarathon runner known for his 4,568-kilometre run through Australia. He started from Fremantle on 2 April 2005 and finished in Sydney 43 days, 13 hours and 8 minutes later. By this feat, he beat the previous world record of Serge Girard from 1999.

=== Deborah De Williams ===
Deborah De Williams AM successfully walked around Australia in 2003–04, and set a world record for the longest walk by any woman in the process. On 25 October 2008, she began running from Hobart in an anti-clockwise direction to raise funds for the national breast Cancer Foundation. She made it to Darwin before being injured, and was subsequently forced to withdraw from the run on 5 June 2009. On 27 March 2010, she restarted her run again from Hobart and successfully circumambulated the continent on 8 May 2011. In doing so, she set another world record for the longest run for a woman. In 2015 Deborah was awarded the Member of the Order of Australia in the Australia Day Honours for her service to the cancer community and ultra marathoning community and in doing so is officially recognised as the first woman to run around Australia.

=== Remi Camus ===
Rémi Camus ran across Australia, Capital to Capital, Melbourne to the Top End, Darwin. He covered his journey in 100 days at an average of 54 km (34 mi) per day (more than 5,300 km (3,293 mi)). He completed his journey with no vehicle support, pulling a trailer of 45 kg (99 lb). He went to visit two Aboriginal Communities, Docker River located 182 km (113 mi) west of Kata Tjuta and Mutitjulu located behind Uluru. He recorded his journey with 2 video cameras. He also raised money for a charity, Syndrome of Lowe, a genetic disease that affect mostly boys.

=== Cesar Guarin ===
Cesar Guarin ran across Australia in 2011, as part of his Global Run for an advocacy to help Filipino children experiencing poverty. His run across Australia was the fifth leg of his Global run and has a total distance of 2,053 km (1,276 mi) from Melbourne to Brisbane. The Australian run hoped to raise $200,000 funds.

=== Patrick Malandain ===
Patrick Malandain (born 1960) ran across Australia from Sydney to Perth during the 2013 Trans-Continental Run, completing the 3,861 km (2,399 mi) race in 38 days, 12 hours and 58 minutes. He ran average 100.177 km (62.247 mi) per day. He breaks Achim Heukemes's record since 2005..

=== Janette Murray-Wakelin and Alan Murray ===
Ultra-marathoners Janette Murray Wakelin and Alan Murray ran around Australia in 2013, taking 366 days to complete the journey. The couple, aged in their 60s, averaged at least 1 marathon per day. They followed predominantly Highway 1. They aimed to promote the raw food movement.

=== Tom Denniss ===
Tom Denniss ran across Australia from Perth to Sydney in 2013. It was the final leg on his world circumnavigation run, which he commenced on New Year's Day, 2012, in Sydney. The trans-Australia leg was 97 days from 10 June to 13 September 2013, covering 5,000 km from Cottesloe Beach in Perth, to Kalgoorlie, Norseman, then across the Nullarbor Plain, then Melbourne and finally Sydney, where he completed his world run on Friday, 13 September 2013. This was the fastest ever circumnavigation of the Earth on foot, some 40 days quicker than Jesper Olsen's earlier circumnavigation. Denniss' entire run raised $60,000 for Oxfam Australia.

=== Mark Allison ===
Mark Allison is known as Run Geordie Run and as part of his charity money raising he completed the run across Australia in January 2014.

=== James Brooman ===
James Brooman ran from Cottesloe Beach, Perth, to Bondi Beach, Sydney. The journey was solo and unsupported, with James pushing a buggy the entire distance. Beginning on 11 March 2015 he completed the journey of 2,562 mi (4,123 km) in a time of 81 days, 5 hours 55 minutes. The route took him through Kalgoorlie, across the Nullarbor on Highway 1 and through the Blue Mountains via Cowra. Prior to this journey James was an inexperienced runner, completing 3 marathons since 1999, and began his running training for this challenge in December 2014.

=== Dave Alley ===
From Sunday, 19 April 2015, Dave Alley ran a full lap of Australia starting and finishing at Lismore Oval, completing the circumnavigation on 11 October 2015 in a total time of 175 days, 4 hours and 49 minutes, covering a total distance of 13,971 km. Alley's route took him up the east coast to Townsville, across to Mount Isa and Three Ways, north to Darwin, south to Katherine, west to Broome, south to Perth, through the Goldfields and across the Nullarbor to Adelaide, east to Melbourne, north along the Hume Highway to Sydney, and then via the New England Highway back to Lismore. Alley undertook the run as part of his Race Around Australia '2' challenge to raise funds and awareness for depression.

Along the way, Alley broke the long-standing record for the fastest circumnavigation of Australia on foot, previously held by Pat Farmer, who had set a time of 174 days in 1999.

=== Jason P. Lester ===
The first American male to run across Australia. Jason P. Lester's Trans Australia Run started in Scarborough Beach, Western Australia and ended 135 days later in Bateman's Bay, New South Wales. Lester ran 118 days, 2,633 miles, of which 2,000 miles were self supported pulling his gear in a 50 lb cart.

=== Richard Bowles ===
In 2012 Richard Bowles covered almost the entire length of the Great Dividing Range, along Australia's Bicentennial National Trail at 5,330 km.

=== Nedd Brockmann ===
Nedd Brockmann ran from Cottesloe Beach to Bondi Beach over 46 days in 2022, raising money for mobilise to help people experiencing homelessness across Australia.

=== Nikki Love ===
Nikki Love ran from Cottesloe Beach to Bondi Beach over 77 days in 2023, raising money for the ADHD Foundation's Umbrella Project.

=== Guy Schweitzer ===
Guy Schweitzer ran from Port Hedland to Scarborough in 78 days, covering a total distance of 4,900 km, with a daily average of 62 kilometres (39 mi). Schweitzer had the assistance of a support crew while covering the remote interior, but often wheeled his food and supplies in a two-wheel cart.

=== Chris Turnbull ===
On 16 September 2023, Chris Turnbull a 39-year-old from the Northern Beaches of Sydney became the fastest person to run from Perth to Sydney and the second fastest in either direction. He completed the journey in 39 days, 8 hours and 1 minute and covered 3,864 kilometres. He started his run at Cottesloe Beach in Perth, Western Australia, at 5am (GMT+8) on 8 August 2023 and finished at Manly Beach in Sydney, New South Wales, at 3:01pm (AEST +10) on 16 September 2023.

=== Lambros ===
In 2024, Stefan and Lachlan Lamble, a brother duo better known by their collective social media handle Lambros, ran approximately 3,360 km from Perth to Melbourne to raise money for cancer research. The duo attracted more than 522,000 Instagram followers and more than 10 million YouTube views. They also garnered mainstream press. Additionally, they were the first brothers to run across Australia in recorded history, raising A$212,628 for cancer research as of June 2024. They completed their journey in 85 days despite injuries such as stress fractures, achilles tendinitis, and a torn meniscus.

=== Sean Bell ===
On Sunday, 10 March 2024, Sean Bell started running from gate 2 at the MCG in Melbourne at 5:04am (AEDT). He then proceeded to the A1, running up Australia's east coast to Sydney and Brisbane, before turning left at Townsville and heading west to Mt Isa. Sean then ran to Darwin and Broome before heading south towards Perth, reaching 10,000 km (6,214 mi) in 118 days, 2 hours and 4 minutes between Geraldton and Perth. Sean then continued through Perth to Adelaide via the Goldfields and the Nullarbor before returning to gate 2 of the MCG in Melbourne at 5:30pm (AEST) on Thursday 22 August 2024, completing the full circumnavigation of Australia in 165 days, 13 hours and 26 minutes, having run a total distance of 13,964.11 km (8,676.89 mi). Bell had no rest days and maintained an overall daily average of 84.34 km (52.4 mi). Bell's journey raised over $177,000 for Make-A-Wish Australia.

Bell reached the historical benchmark distance of 13,383 km in 158 days, 16 hours and 52 minutes, surpassing the previous fastest time of 169 days, 15 hours and 31 minutes, set by Dave Alley.

=== Chad Aziz ===
On Wednesday, 20 May 2026, Chad Aziz started running from Cottesloe Beach in Perth, and finished 62 days later at Archer Park in Bondi Beach, Sydney. Aziz became a Guinness World Record holder for being the youngest person to ever run across Australia, completed at the age of 20. He also ran with the goal of raising $100,000 for a youth mental health charity Zero2Hero.

== See also ==
- Fundraising
- List of people who have walked across Australia
- Running
- Twenty-first-century fundraising walks in Tasmania
- Ultra-marathon running
