= Joseph Patrick (disambiguation) =

Joseph or Joe Patrick may refer to:

- Joseph Patrick (1857-1941), Canadian businessman
- Joseph C. Patrick (1892-1965), chemist, inventor of Thiokol (polymer)
- Joe Patrick (footballer) (1910-1991), English footballer, see List of Bury F.C. players (1–24 appearances)
- Joe "Tiger" Patrick II (born 1963), Army veteran
