= List of people who have crossed Canada on foot =

This is a list of people who have walked or run across Canada from the east coast to the west coast or vice versa. Walking or running across Canada has long been pursued as a way to seek notoriety or bring publicity to social causes.

== 1921 Halifax Herald Coast to Coast Race ==
This was an informal race across Canada fueled by the Halifax Herald newspaper. In 1921, Jack Behan and his son Clifford of Dartmouth, Nova Scotia; husband and wife Frank and Jennie Dill of Windsor, Nova Scotia; and Charles Burkman of Whitewood, Saskatchewan, all walked from Halifax, Nova Scotia, to Vancouver, British Columbia. In order of arrival in Vancouver, the Behans completed the walk in 136 days, the Dills in 134 days, and Burkman in 139 days. Although the Behans were the first to reach Vancouver, the Dills did not leave until seven days after the Behans began their walk. This trek was followed-up by the Behans and Dills attempting a race from Montreal, Quebec to Halifax.

== Jackson Charron-Okerlund ==
Jackson Charron-Okerlund (CrossCanadaJax) ran across Canada to raise money for cancer research. He began his journey on 6 March 2023, from the Terry Fox memorial in St. John's, Newfoundland, and completed his 7,000-kilometre, 160-day trek on 12 August in Port Coquitlam, British Columbia. Charron-Okerlund live-streamed his run on social media and raised more than $100,000 CAD.

== Jennie Dill ==
Jennie (Jenny) Dill was the first woman to walk across Canada. See 1921 Halifax Herald Coast to Coast Race.

== Steve Fonyo ==
Steve Fonyo ran across Canada in 1984–1985 and raised $14 million for cancer research. Fonyo began his Journey for Lives run on 31 March 1984, at age 18 and completed it 425 days later on 29 May 1985, covering 7,924 km (4,924 mi). In recognition, he was named an Officer of the Order of Canada in 1985.

== Beresford Greatheed ==
Beresford Greatheed was the first person to walk across Canada. He made his journey in 1895, departing Vancouver, British Columbia on 2 March 1895, and arriving in Halifax, Nova Scotia twelve months later. Greatheed's cross-Canada walk was intended to be the first leg in a walk around the world that he undertook to win $50,000. According to an article on 24 August 1891, edition of The Times (London), "...two clubs in Vancouver, The Union and Vancouver, wagered $50,000 on whether a man could walk around the world in five years living without money or luggage and depending entirely upon his own exertions." Greatheed took up the challenge.

== John Hugh Gillis ==
In 1906, on a bet and a dare, John Hugh Gillis walked from North Sydney, Nova Scotia to Vancouver, British Columbia. While some have reported him to be the first person to cross Canada on foot, that honour belongs to Beresford Greatheed. Gillis departed North Sydney on 31 January 1906, with two companions, both of whom left his company in Montreal, Quebec. Near Ignace, Ontario, he was joined by Charles Jackman. Jackman had begun his walk in Montréal on 14 April with the goal of catching up to and overtaking Gillis. The two of them walked 2,700 km together and strode into Vancouver station at midnight 24 September 1906.

== Rick Hansen ==
As part of his Man in Motion World Tour, a 26-month trek in a wheelchair to create awareness of the potential of people with disabilities and to find a cure for paralysis after spinal cord injury, Rick Hansen logged 40,075 km through 34 countries on four continents (North America, Europe, Oceania, and Asia) before crossing Canada. His cross-Canada ride started in Cape Spear, Newfoundland, on 26 August 1986, and finished on 22 May 1987, in Vancouver. He completed the crossing in 2 years, 2 months and 2 days, averaging 80 kilometers per day.

== Steve Hartwig ==
Steve Hartwig, a Canadian Armed Forces veteran suffering from PTSD that resulted from a posting to the war zone in the former Yugoslavia, walked from Vancouver, British Columbia to St. John's, Newfoundland, in 2014. He left Vancouver on 23 June 2014, and arrived in St. John's on 13 September. Each day on the journey he walked a 32-km forced march, also called a military hike. He undertook the walk to raise awareness of PTSD and entitled his walk, "Into No Man's Land".

== Burnest Heard ==
A Heard postcard.

Burnest Heard (born Burnest Watson Heard Wozny), the self-styled "World's Greatest Lover", walked from Vancouver, British Columbia, to Halifax, Nova Scotia, and back. Heard set out on 1 June 1937, and arrived in Halifax 19 months later, in December 1939. He pushed a 150-pound oil drum across the country to make it clear that he did not hitch-hike during his journey. Heard paid for his trip by selling postcards of himself, at 10 cents apiece; he claimed to have sold 18,000 of them. He stayed in hotels and bought his own food. After a rest in Halifax, he began his return trip on 1 February 1940, and took two years and ten months to reach Vancouver in December 1942. His first cross-country transit was widely reported in newspapers all over the US and Canada; however, his return journey was only featured in the Canadian press.

== Al Howie ==
In 1991, Al Howie ran from St. John's, Newfoundland, to Victoria, British Columbia in 72 days, 10 hours and 23 minutes, departing St. John's on 21 June and arriving in Victoria on 1 September. His 7295.5 km transit (100 km a day for 72 days) is recognised by Guinness World Records as the fastest crossing of Canada on foot (male).

== Sarah Jackson ==
In 2015, then 24-year-old Sarah Jackson left Victoria, British Columbia and arrived in St. John's, Newfoundland on 30 May 2017. She became the first woman to walk the entire Trans Canada Trail.

== Ann Keane ==
In 2002, Ann Keane ran from St. John's, Newfoundland to Tofino, British Columbia in 143 days, departing St. John's on 17 April and arriving in Tofino on 8 September. Her 7,831 km transit is recognised by Guinness World Records as the fastest crossing of Canada on foot (female).

== Ryan Keeping ==
Ryan Keeping (born in 1998) is an ultramarathon runner from Halifax, Nova Scotia. Inspired by his hero Terry Fox, he completed a 7,342 km run across Canada in 99 days. He set out on 1 April 2024, from St Johns, Newfoundland, and arrived in Victoria, British Columbia on 7 July 2024, 99 days later. He ran the entire route at approximately 75 km/day, with each day broken into three 25 km segments.

He was inspired to do this run due to several of his immediate family members being diagnosed with heart disease. He raised over $240,000 CAD through GoFundMe; of which at least 80% will go to the Heart & Stroke Foundation (with the remainder financing the expenses on his journey).

His motto for the run was "Flip the Switch". To flip the switch is to start to become the person you want to be; it's taking that first step towards deciding you're going to better yourself.

== Jamie McDonald ==
In 2013–2014, Jamie McDonald ran across Canada (wearing a Flash costume) and raised a quarter of a million British pounds for children's charities. He was born with the rare spinal condition syringomyelia, and at nine years old was told by doctors he would be unable to walk. Fortunately, McDonald's symptoms "gradually disappeared". In 2014, while on a visit to Canada, he decided to run across the country. At the beginning of his journey, he ran about 10–13 miles a day but with his tourist visa and winter kicking in (at which point several areas reached minus 40 degrees) after a couple of months, he ran approximately a marathon a day. He began his journey in St John's, Newfoundland on 9 March 2013, and arrived in Vancouver, British Columbia on 4 February 2014.

== Jonathan ("Jon") Nabbs ==
Jonathan ("Jon") Nabbs, an adventure athlete and mental health researcher from Kaipaki, New Zealand, ran from St Johns, Newfoundland, to Victoria, British Columbia, between May 2023 and March 2024. Inspired by Terry Fox's Marathon of Hope, Nabbs visited children's cancer wards en route, seeking to constructively channel the grief from the loss of his parents to cancer in the months immediately prior to the run. Taking after cross-Canada running pioneer Jamie McDonald in 2013, he ran in a superhero costume for much of the distance.

In running the cross-country journey solo and devoid of a support vehicle, he is preceded by McDonald, South African Dave Chamberlain, and Canadians Andy Sward and Eddie Dostaler.

Upon reaching Victoria, in June 2024, Nabbs travelled to New Zealand to replicate the project. He ran the 2,031 km from Bluff to Cape Reinga over 35 days - including 2 days of visits with the Child Cancer Foundation of New Zealand - in an official Guinness World Record attempt, which fell short of the documentation requirements and was unsuccessful.

Nabbs's run across Canada raised CA$120,000 for Canadian and New Zealand child cancer charities, saw local winter temperatures reach -50 °C, took 305 days to complete, and is the subject of the acclaimed documentary Race Be Run - from Vancouver-based 5 Yard Productions - which premiered at DocEdge 2026.

== Dave Proctor ==
Dave Proctor, an ultramarathoner from Okotoks, Alberta, crossed Canada on foot in 2022 from St. John's, Newfoundland, to Victoria, British Columbia. He completed the 7,159 km journey in 67 days, 10 hours and 27 minutes, averaging over 105 km per day without taking a single rest day. This run broke Al Howie's 1991 trans-Canada speed record by five days. Proctor faced illness and injury during the attempt but persevered, supported by his crew. His run was verified by the Association of Canadian Ultramarathoners and GPS data from COROS.

== Trevor Redmond ==
Trevor Redmond walked from Stanley Park, British Columbia to the east coast of Canada and halfway back, between 2006 and 2007, for cancer prevention, research and awareness. He covered 11,421 kilometers.

Currently running across Canada from Halifax, Redmond runs dressed entirely in yellow and calls himself "the Fellow in Yellow". He has run 14660 kilometres as of Marathon Ontario. Trevor has completed a run through all 10 provinces from coast to coast and is running his way back.

A Run For Courage is in support of mental health and physical mobility. This run has reached into Southern Ontario as far south as Windsor and included parts of Vancouver Island as far as Campbell River.

The Grand Trifecta

Walked 11 421 kilometres (2006–2007) Bicycled 14 632 kilometres (2009)

Run 14660 kilometres (2024–2026) currently

== Skylar Roth-MacDonald ==
Skylar Roth-MacDonald ran across Canada in 2021 to raise $50,000 and awareness for the Canadian Mental Health Association. He set out from Victoria, British Columbia on 1 June 2021, and completed his run 143 days later in St. John's, Newfoundland on 12 October. He ran more than 7,200 km and raised more than $65,000.

== Sébastien Sasseville ==
Sébastien Sasseville ran across Canada in 2014 to raise awareness about living with diabetes. He left St. John's, Newfoundland on 2 February 2014, and arrived in Vancouver, British Columbia on 14 November 2014, World Diabetes Day. His nine-month journey was the equivalent of 5 or 6 marathons each week.

== Melanie Vogel ==
Melanie Vogel became the first woman to complete a coast-to-coast-to-coast through-hike on the Trans Canada Trail. She started her journey in Cape Spear, Newfoundland, on 2 June 2017, and completed her 20,000 km journey at Point Zero of the Trans Canada Trail at Clover Point in Victoria, British Columbia on 12 November 2022. In addition to walking from the Atlantic to the Pacific oceans, she also traveled north to the Arctic Ocean; following the Trans Canada Trail.

She was recognised by the Royal Canadian Geographical Society, who awarded her with a Women's Expedition Grant in 2019. The duration of Vogel's trek was extended due to the COVD-19 pandemic.

== Ken Weldrick ==
Ken Weldrick (born in MacKayville, Quebec) was a 23-year-old social worker from Vancouver, British Columbia, who embarked on a cross-Canada jog in December 1974. Known as The Happy Jogger, Weldrick aimed to raise awareness and funds (he raised $17,000), dedicated to supporting mentally and physically challenged individuals. He was motivated by his disillusionment with government closures of training facilities for vulnerable populations.

Weldrick was sponsored by Adidas, Life Brand Vitamins (Shoppers Drug Mart), and Three Vets (a former outdoor and surplus store in Vancouver). His journey began in Vancouver, British Colulmbia, and took him across the country through extreme winter conditions, covering thousands of kilometers on foot.

During his run through the Prairies, in subzero temperatures, Ken suffered serious frostbite to his face, hands and feet and was hospitalized for 2 months, before he recommenced his run.

His run concluded in Newfoundland in July 1975. Local newspapers documented his progress, including The Westmount Examiner, which noted his passage through Westmount, Quebec, on 19 June 1975. Later, on 2 July 1975, Green Bay News reported that Minister Tom Doyle welcomed him in front of the Confederation Building in Newfoundland, marking the completion of his cross-country journey.

Despite being one of the earliest known individuals to run across Canada, Weldrick's story remains largely undocumented in mainstream history.

== Michael Yellowlees ==
Michael Yellowlees completed an 8,000-kilometre fundraising walk across Canada on 5 December 2021, when he arrived at Cape Spear on the eastern edge of Newfoundland. He began his walk in Tofino, British Columbia on 5 March 2021. He raised more than $60,000 for the Trees for Life charity. Yellowlees was accompanied by Luna, his Husky dog.

== See also ==
- Transcontinental walk
- List of people who have run across Australia
- List of people who have walked across Australia
- Twenty-first-century fundraising walks in Tasmania
- List of people who have walked across the United States
