= List of people who have walked across the United States =

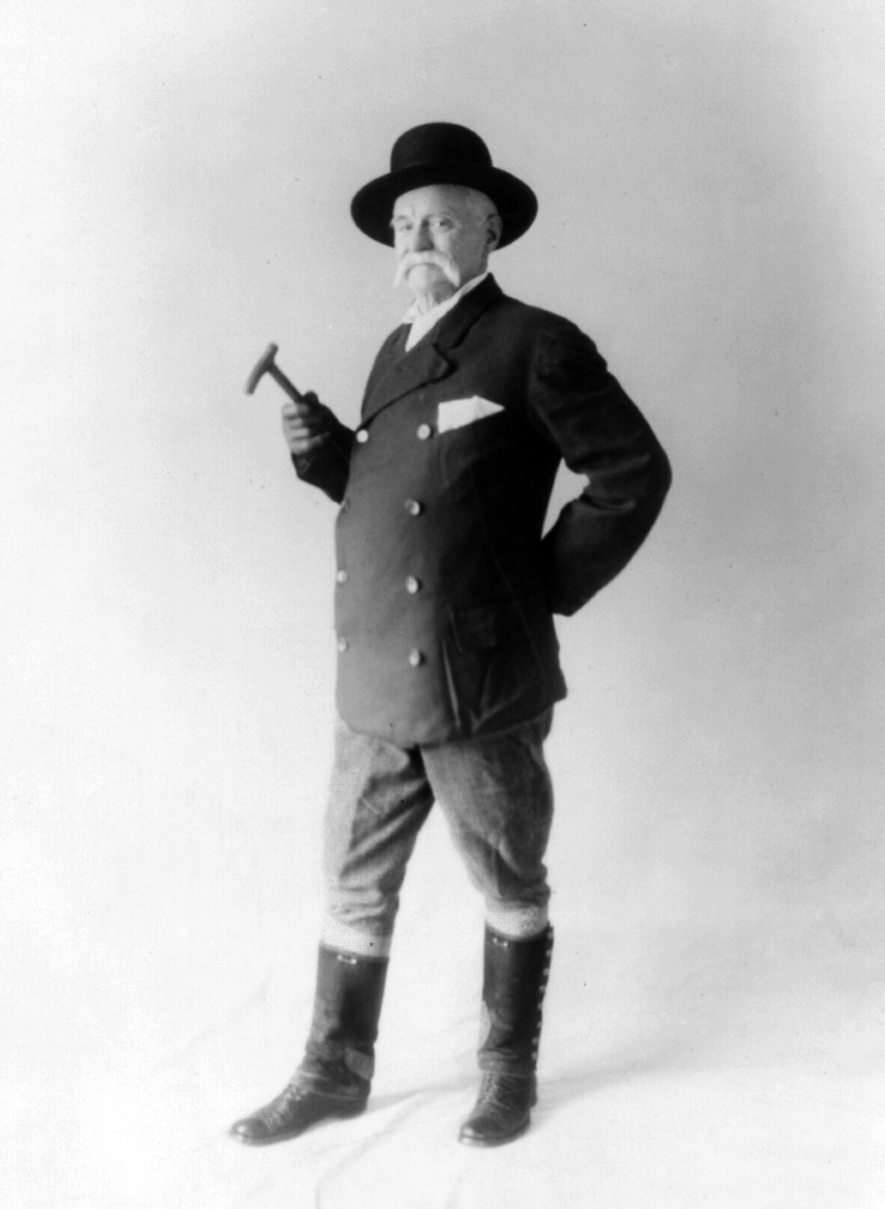
Edward Payson Weston made a publicized walk across the United States in 1909.

This is a list of people who have walked across the United States from the east coast to the west coast or vice versa. Walking or running across the United States has long been pursued as a way to bring publicity to social causes.

== Jerry and Cindy Schultz ==
Jerry and Cindy Schultz completed their Habitrek 96, a fundraising effort for Habitat for Humanity that included a walk across America, starting on February 10, 1996 in Olympia, WA and ending in Atlanta, GA on August 30, 1996. They co-authored a book called Sole Mates (2003), describing their experience.

== Sam Rezaei and James Dill ==
On June 17, 2022, childhood friends Sam Rezaei (21 years old) and James Dill (22 years old) set out to walk across the United States, starting at the Coney Island Boardwalk in Brooklyn, New York. On December 3, 2022, 170 days and over 2,800 miles later, they completed their journey at Santa Monica Pier in Los Angeles.

== Robert Pope ==
In April 2018, Robert Pope, age 39, became the first person to complete the Forrest Gump run, 15,621 miles (25,140 km), 5 times across America, in 422 days of running. This remains the biggest continuous run in history in a single country and involved him becoming the first person to run across the United states three times in one year.

== Pete Kostelnick ==
In October 2016, Pete Kostelnick, age 29, set the current world record for fastest run across America; he ran the 3,067 miles (4,936 km) from San Francisco's City Hall to New York's City Hall in 42 days, 6 hours, 30 minutes.

== John Lees ==
John Lees gained the world record for walking across the US, starting at Los Angeles City Hall on 11 April 1972, he walked for 53 days, 12 hours and 15 minutes to New York City Hall, finishing on 3 June 1972.

== Max and Zac Prizant ==
Max and Zac Prizant, 24-year-old identical twins, started their journey May 21, 2020. The twins crossed the Brooklyn Bridge on New Years Eve of 2020, raising $15,000 for Heart to Heart International's Covid-19 Relief Fund in the process. They encountered obstacles including ten charging wild stallions in Dixie Valley, Nevada; week-long stretches of triple- and single-digit temperatures in Stockton, California, and the Appalachian Mountains, respectively; 800 miles (1,300 km) of oncoming traffic along I-80 West, and the incineration of their support vehicle in York, Nebraska, (after finding a replacement, the twins completed the last 500 miles (800 km) of the journey from Youngstown, Ohio, to Brooklyn, New York by traveling more than 30 miles (48 km) per day from hotel to hotel.)

== Isaiah Glen Shields ==
Isaiah Glen Shields began walking from his home in Provo, Utah, on May 13, 2021. From there he walked to the western-most point of the continental United States, reaching the Pacific Ocean at Cape Alava, in Washington States Olympic Peninsula on August 1, 2021. From there he turned around to walk to the Eastern-most point of the continental United States at the West Quoddy Head light in Lubec, Maine. He reached the Atlantic Ocean in South Carolina.

== Noah Coughlan ==
In 2015, Noah Coughlan, 33, of Vacaville, California, became the third person to run across the United States three times, completing a 3,000-mile (4,800 km) solo trek from New York City to San Diego in 127 days to raise awareness for rare diseases. He first crossed in 2011, running 2,500 miles (4,000 km) from Ocean Beach in San Diego to Jacksonville, Florida, in 132 days on the Run for Research. His second journey covered 3,100 miles (5,000 km) from Half Moon Bay, California, to Boston in 108 days on the 2013 Run Coast 2 Coast.

== Bill Bucklew ==
Bill Bucklew departed Tybee Island, Georgia, at 8:30 am, November 24, 2017, and arrived at Imperial beach, San Diego, on January 31, 2018, at 12:45 pm. Bucklew appears to have set the record for walking coast to coast (67 days). Bucklew has Parkinson's disease and walked an average of 1.5 marathons daily. Bucklew raised over $120,000 for the Michael J. Fox Foundation.

== Bradford Lyttle ==
Bradford Lyttle, an organizer with the Committee for Non-Violent Action, and several others walked from San Francisco to New York City, and then through parts of Europe to Moscow, Russia, from December 1960 until late 1961. The action was called the San Francisco to Moscow March for Peace. Several participants, including Lyttle, walked the entire distance.

== Dale James Outhouse, Adele Kushner, Kevin James Shay ==
These participants of A Walk of the People – A Pilgrimage for Life walked across the United States in 1984 as part of the action that called for global nuclear disarmament and better relations between the U.S. and the then Soviet Union. The march started at Point Conception, California, and went through Texas and the Deep South to New York City. Several others, including Andy Rector, walked significant portions across the U.S. and continued in Europe to Moscow, Russia, in 1985.

== Ed Fallon, Miriam Kashia, Mackenzie McDonald Wilkins, Jeffrey Czerwiec, Steve Martin ==
These were the five participants in the Great March for Climate Action who completed every step of the 3,100-mile (5,000 km) walk from Los Angeles, California, to Washington, D.C., between March 1 and November 1, 2014. Halfway through the March, Steve Martin left the main body of marchers to walk solo to New York, arriving there on September 21 as an emissary from the Great March for Climate Action to the People's Climate March.

== Mark Baumer ==
Mark Baumer walked across the US in 81 days in 2010. While attempting a barefoot walk several years later, he was killed by an SUV in Florida.

== Michael Ross and George Crawford ==
Michael Ross, 18, from Manchester, Connecticut, walked from Danbury, Connecticut, to Huntington Beach, California. This walk took 297 days and was in an effort to raise funds and awareness for the Livestrong Foundation. Over $13,000 was raised. Michael was accompanied by his childhood friend, George Crawford. The walk started April 2013 and ended February 2014.

== Philip Cihiwsky ==
Phil Cihiwsky, 59, from Loveland, Colorado, walked from San Diego, California, to York Harbor, Maine, starting his walk on March 4 and completing it on October 4, 2013. He walked 3,300 miles (5,300 km), crossing 15 states in 7 months while raising awareness about food insecurity issues among older adults for Meals On Wheels and encouraging the people he met along the way to support home-delivered meal programs in their own communities.

== Elliott Lannen and Graeme Lithgow ==
Elliott Lannen and Graeme Jeffrey Lithgow walked from San Francisco, California, to St. Augustine, Florida, from 2013 to 2014. The party began with three members, but Julio Lopez abandoned the project after traversing the California coast.

== Helga and Clara Estby ==
Helga Estby, a 36-year-old from Spokane, Washington, and her 18-year-old daughter Clara walked from Spokane to New York City in 1896, setting off on May 5, 1896, passing through 14 states along the way, and arriving at the latter on Christmas Eve. She did so in response to a $10,000 challenge from a sponsor given to any woman who would walk across the United States. She brought with her a compass, red-pepper spray, a revolver, and a curling iron. She wanted the money in order to save her family's 160-acre (65 ha) farm. She did not receive it.

== Louis Michael Figueroa ==
In 1982, Louis Michael Figueroa, age 16, became the fastest and youngest person (according to some sources) to run across the United States, covering the route from New Brunswick, New Jersey, to San Francisco in 60 days to fulfill a promise to a friend who was dying of bone cancer.

In 1996–1997 he walked from Bangor, Maine, to San Diego for local AIDS networks in memory of his brother Jimmy, who died of the disease. The walk was plagued by delays due to Figueroa's battle with acute lymphocytic leukemia.

In 2005, he began a walk around the United States for victims of child abuse. Figueroa walked for six months and covered 6,437 miles (10,359 km) of the 12,070 miles (19,420 km).

On June 4, 2010, Figueroa left from where he previously stopped, 6.43 miles (10.35 km) west of Somerset, Pennsylvania, and arrived in Tucson on January 15, 2011.

== Steve Fugate ==
Steve Fugate walked across the U.S. eight times spreading awareness on depression and suicide. A resident of Vero Beach, Florida, Fugate also walked to raise awareness for the Florida panther. He began walking across the U.S. carrying a big sign that says "Love Life", after his son's suicide in 1999. In 2005 Fugate's daughter died of an accidental overdose. "Trail Therapy: The 34,000 mile journey" is a mini documentary on Fugate.

== Aaron Huey and Cosmo ==
Aaron Huey, age 26, left Encinitas, California, on January 22, 2002, and arrived in New York City 3,349 miles (5,390 km) and 154 days later on June 25. His only travel companion was his dog Cosmo. He did not carry a cell phone and had no support team. Huey covered the why and how in his 2010 Annenberg Foundation lecture, and Huey also wrote journals of his travels along the way.

== Barbara Moore ==
Barbara Moore (1903–1977), a Russian-born health enthusiast, walked 3,387 miles (5,451 km) from San Francisco to New York City in 85 days in 1960, departing on April 13 and arriving on July 6.

== Richard H. Noble ==
From March 12, 2011, through June 9, 2012, Richard Noble, a gay rights activist, walked with a rainbow flag from San Francisco to Jacksonville Beach, Florida.

== James Harry Pierce ==
James Harry Pierce, a writer, street performer, and tour guide began his walk across the United States on May 30, 2011, at the age of 41 just south of Seattle, Washington, arriving in Key West, Florida, where he settled on February 7, 2012. For a number of years he performed nightly on Duval Street dressed as Darth Vader playing the banjo. He since leads bicycle tours of Key West.

== Peace Pilgrim ==
Peace Pilgrim, née Mildred Lisette Norman (July 18, 1908 – July 7, 1981), was an American pacifist, vegetarian, and peace activist. Starting on January 1, 1953, she walked across the United States for 28 years until her death in 1981. She had no organizational backing, carried no money, and would not even ask for food or shelter. When she began her pilgrimage she had taken a vow to "remain a wanderer until mankind has learned the way of peace, walking until given shelter and fasting until given food." At the time of her death, she was crossing the United States for the seventh time.

== Granny D ==
Granny D (née Doris Haddock, January 24, 1910 – March 9, 2010) achieved international fame in February 2000 when, at age 90, she completed her walk across the U.S. to support campaign finance reform. A resident of Dublin, New Hampshire, Granny D started the walk January 1, 1999, shortly before her 89th birthday in Pasadena, California, amid the Rose Parade festivities. Despite being hospitalized for pneumonia after walking across the Mojave Desert, Granny D completed her walk on Leap Day of the following year, more than 400 days later, having traversed over 3,200 miles (5,100 km) across nine states (California, Arizona, New Mexico, Texas, Arkansas, Tennessee, Kentucky, West Virginia, and Maryland). She had to travel much of the last 100 miles (160 km) on cross-country skis due to a snowstorm that made walking impossible. She wrote about her walk in two books. The first was co-authored by Dorris Haddock (Granny D) and Dennis Burke, Granny D: Walking Across America in my 90th Year. She chronicled her expedition and reasons for undertaking it in an autobiography entitled You're Never Too Old to Raise a Little Hell published in 2003. The following year, at age 94, she ran as Democratic candidate against Judd Gregg in the New Hampshire senate race, but was soundly defeated. She died shortly after turning 100, on March 9, 2010.

== Chad Sigmon ==
Chad Sigmon was 38 years old when he ran across America starting April 1, 2013, from Jacksonville, Florida, and ending August 1 in San Diego, California. He ran to help end mental health stigma. He averaged around 22 miles (35 km) a day for a total of 2,650 miles (4,260 km).

== Katie Visco ==
From March 29 through December 29, 2009, Pave Your Lane's founder, Katie Visco, ran across America, from Boston to San Diego to publicize this campaign, which empowers people to find their passions. At age 24, Visco became the second-youngest and 13th woman overall to run from coast to coast.

== Bob Wieland ==
Bob Wieland is a Vietnam War veteran who lost his legs to a mortar mine in 1969. He "ran" across America on his hands, taking three years, eight months, and six days to travel from coast to coast and raise money for Vietnam war veterans.

== Zachary Bonner ==
Zachary Bonner is a homeless youth advocate. He started a non profit when he was 6 years old called the Little Red Wagon Foundation. At age 8 after seeing a documentary on a woman named Peace Pilgrim he decided to walk from his home in Tampa, Florida, to the state Capitol Tallahassee. The following year at age 9 he continued his walk to Atlanta, Georgia, and that summer at age 11 he walked from Atlanta to Washington, D.C. He vowed to become the youngest to walk Coast to Coast and at age 12 completed that mission by walking from Jacksonville Beach to the Santa Monica Pier. During his walks he used media attention to raise awareness to homeless youth and highlighted many programs working to help these kids. The journey took Zach 7 months to complete.

== Joe "Tiger" Patrick II ==
Joe "Tiger" Patrick II is a Peace Dale, Rhode Island, Army veteran. After volunteering at Ground Zero for three weeks he decided he wanted to do something to bring awareness to the men and women who died as a result of the events during the 9/11 attacks, and those who have died while serving in the military for the United States of America. He committed to walking for the cause. He completed a memorial walk in 2011 and on his second walk in 2013 he walked approximately 3,000 miles (4,800 km) across the United States beginning in April 2013 in the City of Coronado, California, and ending in Washington, D.C., in October 2013.

During this walk he carried a memorial panel that he created on canvas, which displayed the faces of over 6,600 color images of U.S. service members, and weighed over 50 pounds (23 kg). He also carried an American flag and a bat used by Boston Red Sox second baseman Dustin Pedroia.

== Walter O. McGill III ==
Walter McGill, also known as Pastor "Chick" McGill, the "Freedom Walker" and the "Cross Country Flagman," a 69-year-old pastor of the Creation Seventh Day Adventist Church and Vietnam War-era veteran, began to walk across the United States on April 23, 2014, at Kill Devil Hills, North Carolina. He completed his journey on April 29, 2015, at the Santa Monica Pier in Santa Monica, California, after traveling a route of over 3,200 miles (5,100 km), and carrying the United States flag by hand the entire way, the first such documented case. On July 12, 2015, he was honored at Dodger Stadium for the completion of the walk prior to a baseball game between the Los Angeles Dodgers and the Milwaukee Brewers.

McGill's websites promoting the walk, walkingcoast2coast and walkthewalknow.com, indicate an extensive list of causes for which he made the journey, including: civil liberties, human rights, national integrity, the restoration of individual and corporate self-respect, support for traditional family values, liberty of conscience for all citizens, the defense of constitutional principles, the review and appreciation of American heritage, care for the poor and homeless, the promotion of natural health practices, employment of the Golden Rule in daily living, and a spiritual awakening for the healing of the country. Along the way he saluted passing motorists and pedestrians, received certificates of appreciation at the Inland Empire and San Gabriel Valley, and left non-sectarian 40-day prayer guides for city and county officials. He was provided with a police escort part of the way along his walk in Tennessee and Georgia, and was awarded a "Day of Recognition" in his home state of Tennessee by Governor Bill Haslam.

During the portion of the journey through Prescott, Arizona, he dedicated 10 miles (16 km) of his walk to Kayla Mueller, who was captured by ISIS and killed earlier in 2015.

In his closing statements, McGill said, "To be the first veteran to carry Old Glory from sea to shining sea has been a great aspiration of mine, and I'm praying this flag will be enshrined at the Smithsonian Institute [sic]."

== Arthur Hitchcock ==
Arthur Hitchcock is a documentary-editorial photographer who, at age 19, walked from Long Beach, California, to Augusta, Maine, between May 11 and November 2, 2011. He walked approximately 4,100 miles (6,598 km), crossing through 17 states in 175 days. Hitchcock walked to raise funds for breast cancer research and aid to assist families dealing with the cost of hospital bills and treatments. He walked to honor his deceased parents, Janet and Mike Hitchcock. His mother died from ductal carcinoma a few months before the trip. The majority of his route included major highways (it is illegal to walk on most major highways). He was led by a support vehicle.

== John Ball ==
Retired U.S. Air Force Colonel John Ball, aka "The Walking Aggie," walked coast-to-coast across America from March 1, 2015, to August 17, 2015. Beginning at Scripps Park in La Jolla, California, and ending at Daytona Beach, Florida, Ball, age 58, walked 2,686 miles (4,323 km), crossing 8 states in 170 days. His unassisted, uninterrupted walk raised over $27,000 to help establish an Endowed Aggie Ring Scholarship at his alma mater, Texas A&M University. In 2019, John accomplished another long walk, this time across Europe, beginning in Athens, Greece, and ending in Oslo, Norway. This trek took 151 days and covered 2,314 miles (3,724 km) through 7 countries; Greece, Italy, Austria, Germany, Denmark, Sweden, and Norway. In 2024, John once again undertook a long distance trek when he walked from Melbourne to Brisbane, Australia. Following Australia's Hwy 1A (Prince's Hwy) along the east coast, he walked approximately 1,300 miles (2,100 km) in 76 days.

== Anthony Roddy ==
Anthony "Silverback" Roddy is a retired USDA Forest Service worker who, at age 56, walked from Wells Beach, Maine, to Imperial Beach, California, between April 19 and December 15, 2015. A US Army veteran of the war in Iraq, he crossed 13 states in 244 days, walking approximately 3,073 miles (4,946 km). His Walkabout-America 2015 was the culmination of a life-long dream, but moreover was an advocacy campaign to help grant wishes to children with life-threatening medical conditions. He raised more than $5,000 for the Make-a-Wish Foundation.

== Jeffrey Grabosky ==
From January 20 to May 20, 2011, Jeff Grabosky ran solo and unsupported for over 3,700 miles (6,000 km) from Oceanside, California to Smith Point, New York. He took prayer intentions from people all around the world and prayed a decade of the rosary for each of the approximate 3,500 intentions he received. His book, Running With God Across America, was published in 2012.

== Bjorn Suneson ==
In 2025, Bjorn Suneson, a Stockholm native, finished at age 77 his ninth unsupported run across the United States. It is a record for the number of crossings. All of his runs have been unsupported. Eight runs started on the west coast, and one on the east coast. The first crossing took place in 2007. All have been about 3,200 miles with slightly different routes, but all passed Gothenburg, Nebraska. The fastest run lasted 95 days and the slowest 105.

== Mike Maczuzak ==
Mike Maczuzak, president of SmartShape Design, walked solo and unsupported from Coney Island to Santa Monica Pier, covering more than 3,600 miles (5,800 km) in 125 days, and traveling through 15 states, from March to July 2016.

== Jason P. Lester ==
Run Across America — Ran 3,550 miles (5,710 km) in 72 days averaging 50 miles (80 km) a day across the United States (4th Fastest athlete to run from San Francisco to New York (July 2013). The run raised money for the Waves for Water organization's Hurricane Relief Initiative.

== Ted G. Stone ==
Ted G. Stone was a Southern Baptist evangelist and recovering amphetamine addict who walked across the United States three times and was on his fourth trip when he died. He made the walks to raise awareness for his ministry to addicts and would drive up to 150 miles (240 km) off of his walking route to speak to groups. His first trip, in 1996, was 3,650 miles (5,870 km) from the Capitol steps in Washington, D.C., south to Jacksonville, Florida, and west to Los Angeles. His second trip, in 1998, was a 3,550-mile (5,710 km) walk from San Francisco to Virginia Beach, Virginia. His third trip was in 2000 and he walked 1,700 miles (2,700 km) from Nuevo Laredo, Tamaulipas, Mexico, to the Ambassador Bridge in Detroit leading into Canada. He died on his fourth trip in 2006 in Nashville, Tennessee. He was walking from Chicago to Pensacola, Florida, which would have covered 1,100 miles (1,800 km).

== Benjamin T. Lee ==
Benjamin Lee, an Australian, walked from San Francisco to Delaware Bay between May 18 and November 30, 2013. Lee began his walk with a partner but shortly after a month, his partner quit. He continued his walk solo and unsupported. He raised money for the charity Oxfam.

== Yi-joo Kwon ==
In 2010, Yijoo Kwon of Palisades Park, New Jersey, ran 95 days from Los Angeles to New York City to raise awareness of diabetes.

== Stephan Foust ==
Between January 28, 1979, and September 6, 1980, Stephan Foust walked 3,506 miles (5,642 km) across the United States. While en route, Foust, of Elkhart, Indiana, did a weekly remote call-in radio show for WSBT-AM in South Bend, Indiana. The 30-year-old Foust began his journey on the Atlantic Ocean beach at Nags Head, North Carolina, then passed through the states of North Carolina, Tennessee, Missouri, Arkansas, Oklahoma, Kansas, Colorado, Utah, Nevada, and California, before ending his walk on the Pacific Ocean beach of Point Reyes National Seashore.

== The United Souls of Awareness ==
The United Souls of Awareness, a creative production team from Los Angeles, embarked on a year-long walk from Venice Beach, California, to Manhattan, New York, from April 1, 2006, to April 1, 2007. The core members, Kevin Smith II, Kam Talbert, Jordon Cooper, and Jonathan White, with many other walkers joining along, did this more than 4,000-mile (6,400 km) walk to encourage self expression, inspire themselves and others and they trekked town to town, sharing ideas and information. They ended the walk at a Full Moon Drum circle in New York City at Visionary Artist Alex and Allison Grey New York City Art Gallery COSM.

== Shane Moore ==
Shane Moore did a solo walk from Jacksonville Beach, Florida, to Ocean Beach, California, in order to raise awareness and money for homeless veterans. He began his walk on October 10, 2017, and officially completed his journey on May 12, 2018. During his journey, he did several TV, newspaper and radio interviews. In total, he walked between 2,600 and 2,700 miles (4,200 and 4,300 km).

== Gary "Laz" Cantrell ==
Gary Cantrell "Lazarus Lake" did a solo walk (LazCon) across America from Newport, Rhode Island, to Newport, Oregon. The walk was a total of 3,365 miles (5,415 km) and took him from May 10, 2018, to September 13, 2018. Laz is the co-creator of the race The Barkley Marathons. He updated a daily blog on his website.

== Ben Walther ==
Ben Walther beat cancer and walked across America between May and November 2017, from California to Delaware, then rode a bicycle back home from Florida to California using Interstates 10 and 8.

== Barrett Keene ==
Barrett Keene, a PhD student at Cornell University, walked from Miami to San Francisco (through Nashville, Denver, and Salt Lake City) in 2012 to raise awareness and support for orphaned and abandoned children. Specifically, Keene was sharing about opportunities to impact the lives of children through the Global Orphan Project. As Barrett was walking, he was also researching teachers who were transformational leaders for his dissertation.

== Mike Posner ==
Mike Posner, internationally famous musician known for his hit pop songs like "Took a Pill in Ibiza", undertook the journey in May 2019. His cause was to honor his late friend Ronnie. He regularly updated his Facebook page throughout the journey and was bitten by a snake along the way. Because of the snake bite injury, he was delayed for nearly a month in Colorado. On October 18, 2019, Posner finished the walk and reached the Pacific Ocean.

== William Shuttleworth ==
A 71-year-old US Air Force veteran, William Shuttleworth, walked from his hometown of Newburyport, Massachusetts, to San Diego, California, from May 15, 2019, to September 1, 2019. Shuttleworth intended to raise awareness for veterans' issues, such as veteran suicide and homelessness. He raised over $58,000 for the Disabled American Veterans charity.

== Noah Barnes and Robert Barnes ==
At age 11, Noah Barnes became the youngest person to walk across the United States when he and his father, Robert Barnes, walked some 4,240 miles (6,820 km) from Key West, Florida, to Blaine, Washington, in 2017 to raise awareness and funds for diabetes research. Noah was diagnosed with Type 1 diabetes when he was 16 months old. His project raised about $30,000, and he set a Guinness World Record for the youngest person to walk across the U.S.

== Erwin Erkfitz ==
47-year-old health food distributor Erwin Erkfitz walked from Los Angeles, California to New York City in 1958 for at the time was the record for a cross-country walk. He traveled 3,000 miles (4,800 km) for 67 days, promoting a shoe and attempting to set what would be the record.

== Matty Gregg ==
41-year-old Matty Gregg ran from Apple Park in Cupertino, California, to Concord, New Hampshire, from November 6, 2018, to August 7, 2019. The run spanned a total of 275 days through 24 states. He totaled 5,425 miles (8,731 km), interviewing hundreds of people for his sequel to Alexis de Tocqueville's essays, Democracy In America. He also raised funds and awareness for Firefighter Cancer Support Network.

== Hannah Bacon ==
27-year-old Hannah Bacon left from San Clemente, California on November 21, 2020, and arrived at Virginia Beach on June 12, 2021. Raising money for Sunrise Movement, a youth-led organization dedicated to solving issues around climate change, she walked for 207 days logging 3,081 miles (4,958 km).

== Luke Woolfolk ==
24-year-old artist Luke Woolfolk, an Iowa native, began his journey on April 1, 2018, at Cape Henlopen, Delaware, embarking upon the American Discovery Trail. Luke walked over 1,500 miles (2,400 km) to reach Adair, Iowa on October 1, 2018, completing the first half of his journey. Woolfolk then resumed his journey in spring 2019, after waiting out the snow and acquiring a heavier-duty stroller. He reached his destination of San Diego, California, on or around December 1, 2019, having walked over 3,000 miles (4,800 km).

== David Green ==
57-year-old David Green and his Brazilian stray dog Lucky left Jax Beach, Florida, on March 22, 2021, with the goal of raising awareness for adopted animals. On April 4, Green developed a grade 3 stress fracture on his right tibia and learned that Lucky had lymphoma. They returned to where they left off on June 2 with the stress fracture healing and Lucky in remission from chemo-therapy and resumed the journey towards Muir Beach. Lucky succumbed to cancer 2,306 miles (3,711 km) later, running almost every day 15–20 miles (24–32 km), and Green arrived at the Pacific on September 26, 3,340.59 miles (5,376.16 km) later. His route touched The Appalachian Trail, Trail of Tears, Santa Fe Trail, Mormon Trail, Pony Express Trail and Historic Route 66.

== Kevin B. Fern ==
In 2018, Kevin B. Fern, founder of Kevin's IV Pole, walked across the United States pushing his IV Pole to raise awareness and funding for Childhood Cancer. Kevin departed Manhattan Beach, California, on March 25, 2018, and arrived in Carson Beach, South Boston on November 9, 2018. His walked covered 3,300 miles (5,300 km). Kevin had the opportunity along the way to meet cancer survivors like him and their families.

== Michael Wardian ==
Michael Wardian ran across the United States in 62 days at the age of 48, starting on May 1, 2022, and finishing on July 1, 2022. He primarily followed Route 50 from west to east, covering a distance of 3,234 miles (5,205 km). Wardian aimed to log around 50 miles (80 km) a day and planned to be on his feet for around 11 to 15 hours a day. Wardian's goal was to finish the journey within 75 days, raising money for World Vision. He raised more than £90,000.

== Emily Haag ==
On May 1, 2022, 29-year-old Emily Haag began her run across the United States in Jacksonville Beach, Florida. Her 2,500-mile (4,000 km) run through seven states ended 85 days later in Santa Monica, California, on July 24, 2022. She ran to raise money and awareness for Students Run LA, a non-profit that provides mentorship and training to underserved middle and high school students in Greater Los Angeles.

== Sean Clancy ==
Under the moniker "SubwaySean", 26-year-old Sean Clancy walked across the United States eating nothing but food available from the Subway chain of restaurants. His walk began on May 1, 2022 at Boston Harbor, Massachusetts, and ended 176 days later at Santa Monica Pier, California, on October 23, 2022. The walk was in aid of the Big City Mountaineers charity. The route took Clancy through 14 states and he live-streamed the walk most days via Twitch using a camera mounted to the baby stroller he was pushing to transport items needed for the journey. In this way, Clancy was able to chat with stream viewers in real time as he walked. The videos documenting the whole walk were later archived on his YouTube channel as well as video clips and social media posts collected together to chart his journey on an interactive map. Although the walk began as an independent venture, by the end of the first month Subway had learned of it and offered sponsorship including a donation to the charity, a custom-made Subway-branded stroller and contribution towards Clancy's food costs.

== Holden Ringer ==
Holden Ringer began his trek in Washington state and, over the course of a year, walked across 20 states to Washington, D.C. Ringer carried his belongings in a stroller he named "Smiley". When asked why he wanted to make the transcontinental journey, he responded, "Because I like walking". He added that he wanted to promote walking as a form of transit and encourage cities to develop more walkable infrastructure, as well as learn more about and develop an appreciation for rural communities in America. Ringer commended the generosity of the people he encountered; he occasionally had people who offered to pay for his hotel stays or his meals. Throughout his walk across the country, he wore through ten pairs of shoes.

== Nels Matson ==
In 2024, Nels Matson ran from San Francisco to New York City in 46 days, 17 hours and 26 minutes. His goal was to raise money and awareness for the country's veterans in honor of Chris Campbell, a U.S. Navy SEAL who lost his life in Extortion 17. Matson carried Campbell's boots around his neck when he reached the finish line at New York City Hall.

== Chantz Rivera ==
In 2026, Chantz Rivera walked from The Bronx, New York to San Francisco in 149 days. He documented the entire trek on his Instagram @yo.mula and was featured on NBC News New York.

== See also ==
- Transcontinental walk
- List of people who have run across Australia
- List of people who have walked across Australia
- List of people who have walked across Canada
- Twenty-first-century fundraising walks in Tasmania
- List of longest walks
- Forrest Gump
