= List of people who have walked across Australia =

Location of Australia

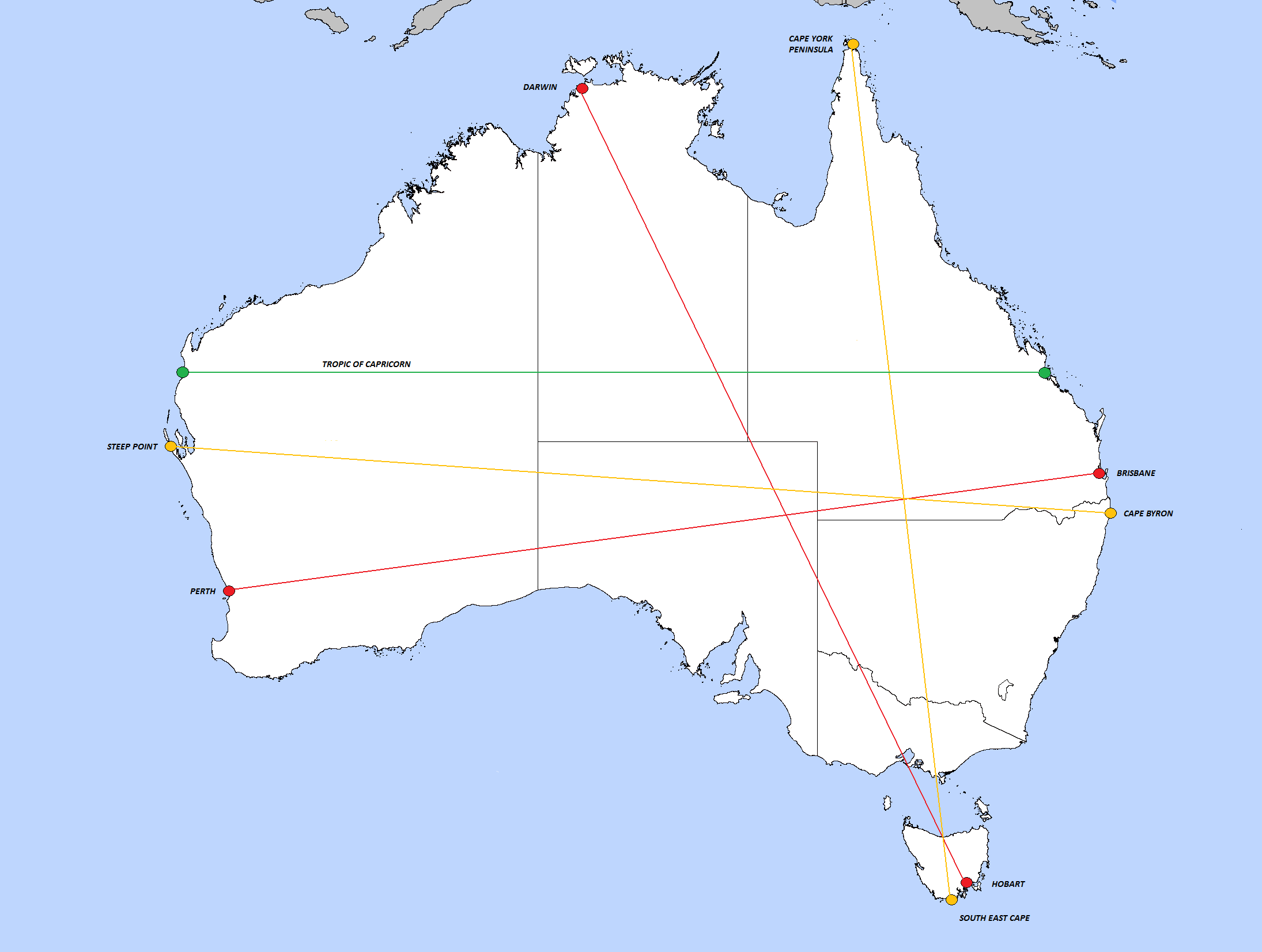
Geographical extremes of Australia, and the cities at each point of the compass

Several people have walled across the entirety of the Australian landscape.

The extremes of Australia for the purpose of this definition are considered to be Steep Point, Western Australia to the (west), Cape Byron (east), Cape York Peninsula (north), and South East Cape (south). The straight-line distance between the east and west is 4,030 km (2,500 mi), whereas the distance in the north–south direction is 3,685 km (2,290 mi). (Note: Distance calculated by author using the resources of Geoscience Australia.) City-pairs on opposite shores include, among others, Perth and Brisbane, Darwin and Hobart, and Perth and Sydney. (Note: As recognised by Guinness World Records as an official city pair for "Fastest Journey on Foot Across Australia world record".)

Walkers who choose to cross Australia can follow the National Highway for large sections of their journey. Those who have successfully completed their walks across the continent have typically taken times of 365 to 897 days to do so. The traversed distances are typically around 14,300 km (8,900 mi) to 17,000 km (11,000 mi) depending on the route taken.

Only eight people are known to have completed such walks alone, passing through all mainland states and territories, without a support vehicle. These include Aidan de Brune, Nobby Young, Colin Ricketts, Andrew 'Cad' Cadigan, Scott Loxley, Mike Pauly, Terra Roam.

== Completed journeys ==
The names of the individuals who have walked across Australia have been listed below. Sources for data contained within this table have been listed within the body of the article, or, where not readily available, directly from the individual concerned. Although listed below, Burke, Wills and King rode horses for a large part of their journey. They are credited as the first English/Irish explorers to cross the continent.

John McDouall Stuart also crossed the continent from Adelaide to the north coast at Stuart Point, 100 km east of today's Darwin. His exploration provided a route for the overland telegraph enabling faster communication with the northern coast.

Name	Nationality	Start date	Finish date	Duration (days)	Starting location	Finishing location
Robert Burke	Ireland	20 August 1860	9 February 1861	174	Melbourne	Karumba ‡
William Wills	England	20 August 1860	9 February 1861	174	Melbourne	Karumba ‡
John King	Ireland	20 August 1860	9 February 1861	174	Melbourne	Karumba ‡
Aidan de Brune	England	24 November 1920	21 February 1921	90	Fremantle	Sydney
Aidan de Brune	England	20 September 1921	4 March 1924	897	Sydney	Sydney
Bob Mossel	Australia	20 May 1973	20 September 1973	124	Port Augusta	Burketown
Bill Mossel	Australia	20 May 1973	20 September 1973	124	Port Augusta	Burketown
Sue Thompson	Australia	20 May 1973	20 September 1973	124	Port Augusta	Burketown
Annabel Douglas-Hill	Australia	20 May 1973	20 September 1973	124	Port Augusta	Burketown
Sharka Dolak	Australia	20 May 1973	20 September 1973	124	Port Augusta	Burketown
Dave Kunst	United States	3 November 1973	20 July 1974	260	Fremantle	Sydney
Aynsley Rowe	Australia	22 April 1977	18 August 1977	119	Mindil Beach Darwin	Glenelg South Australia
Robyn Davidson	Australia	2 January 1977	20 September 1977	243	Alice Springs	Hamelin Pool, Western Australia
Dennis Bartell	Australia	1984	1984	unknown	Gulf of Carpentaria	Gulf St Vincent
Steven Newman	United States	1 July 1985	20 June 1986	293	Darwin	Melbourne
Roger Scott	Australia	6 August 1988	22 November 1988	109	Darwin	Dover
Ffyona Campbell	Scotland	11 September 1988	14 December 1988	95	Sydney	Fremantle
Nobby Young	Australia	1 March 1993	1 March 1994	365	Sydney	Sydney
Deanna Sorensen	Canada	2 May 1998	28 October 1998	180	Perth	Sydney
David Mason	Australia	23 March 1998	13 November 1998	236	Byron Bay	Steep Point
Andrew Harper	Australia	25 April 1999	10 December 1999	229	Tropic of Capricorn
Polly Letofsky	United States	29 October 2000	22 July 2001	267	Melbourne	Port Douglas
Jon Muir	Australia	18 May 2001	22 September 2001	128	Port Augusta	Burketown
Dave Mckern	Australia	15 June 2003	8 November 2003	146	Sydney	Perth
Deborah De Williams	Australia	17 October 2003	23 September 2003	343	Melbourne	Sydney
John Olsen	Australia	2004	unknown	167	Cape York Peninsula	South East Cape
Colin Ricketts	Australia	4 January 2005	17 January 2006	379	Adelaide	Adelaide
Jeff Johnson	Australia	5 April 2007	2 September 2007	151	Port Augusta	Karumba
Michael Mitchell	Australia	5 May 2008	3 May 2009	363	Cape York Peninsula	Wilsons Promontory
Gary Hause	United States	19 May 2008	2 November 2008	168	Cairns	Torquay
John Olsen	Australia	18 June 2008	3 January 2009	200	Steep Point	Cape Byron
Dave Phoenix	Australia	1 August 2008	8 January 2009	161	Melbourne	Karumba
Dave Leaning	United Kingdom	29 April 2009	21 July 2009	84	Port Augusta	Karumba
Mike Pauly	Australia	16 May 2009	19 October 2009	156	Fremantle	Melbourne
Mark Gibbens	Australia	22 February 2009	18 May 2009	86	Perth	Sydney
Leigh Thomson-Matthews	Australia	8 March 2010	3 July 2010	118	Perth	Melbourne
Sam Thomson-Matthews	Australia	8 March 2010	3 July 2010	118	Perth	Melbourne
Mike Pauly	Australia	1 March 2011	26 June 2011	118	Melbourne	Fremantle
Jeff Johnson	Australia	24 April 2011	2 October 2011	162	Cape Byron	Steep Point
Jacob French	Australia	20 July 2011	12 April 2012	268	Perth	Sydney
Andrew Cadigan	Australia	27 December 2010	14 June 2012	536	Sydney	Sydney
Matt Napier	Australia	2 February 2013	28 June 2013	147	Perth	Sydney
Brendon Alsop	Australia	21 February 2013	3 January 2014	317	Geelong	Cairns
Scott Loxley	Australia	2 November 2013	15 June 2015	601	Melbourne	Melbourne
Gary Wilmot	Australia	16 May 2015	17 September 2015	124	Perth	Brisbane
John Olsen	Australia	31 March 2016	24 December 2016	269	Cape York Peninsula	Cape Leeuwin
Ashok Alexander	Australia	15 April 2017	27 September 2017	166	Darwin	Canberra
Tristan Harris	Australia	1 May 2017	31 October 2017	184	HMAS Stirling, Garden Island	HMAS Creswell, Jervis Bay Territory
Terra Roam	Australia	22 February 2014	2 May 2018	4 years	Newcastle	Newcastle
Alwyn Doolan	Australia	16 August 2018	16 August 2019	365	Cape York	Canberra
Bob Hanley	Australia	24 April 1975	6 May 1978	3 years	Sydney	Sydney
Marc Schinkel	Australia	2 May 2019	2 November 2019	185	Sydney	Perth
Nicolo Guarrera	Italy	31 March 2023	07 September 2023	161	Sydney	Darwin
Tom Fremantle	United Kingdom	3 May 2023	29 September 2023	149	Perth	Sydney
Daniel Hart	Australia	01 April 2024	28 October 2024	210	Wilson's Prom	Cape York

‡ Karumba did not exist upon Burke, Wills and King arriving. The site of the town however is widely accepted as the northernmost destination of the Victorian Exploring Expedition.

=== Robert Burke ===
Robert O'Hara Burke was an Irish soldier and police officer, who achieved fame as an Australian explorer. He was the leader of the ill-fated Burke and Wills expedition, which was the first expedition to cross Australia from south to north. The expedition left Melbourne on 20 August 1860 with a total of 19 men, 27 camels, and 23 horses. Burke, along with William Wills, John King, and Charley Gray, reached the mangroves on the estuary of the Flinders River near where the town of Normanton now stands, on 9 February 1861. Flooding rains and swamps meant they never saw open ocean. Upon returning, the expedition was weakened by starvation and exposure, and was hampered by the tropical monsoon downpours of the wet season. Burke died at a place now called Burke's Waterhole on Cooper Creek in South Australia. The exact date of Burke's death is uncertain, but has generally been accepted to be 28 June 1861.

=== William Wills ===
William Wills was a member of the famous Victorian Exploring Expedition. He was originally appointed as third-in-command, surveyor, astronomical and meteorological observer of the expedition in July 1860 on a salary of £300 a year. The expedition left Melbourne on 20 August 1860 with a total of 19 men, 27 camels and 23 horses. They reached Menindee on 16 October 1860 where Landells resigned following an argument with Burke, where Wills was promoted to second-in-command. Burke, along with William Wills, John King, and Charley Gray, reached the mangroves on the estuary of the Flinders River near where the town of Normanton now stands, on 9 February 1861. Flooding rains and swamps meant they never saw open ocean. Upon returning, the expedition was weakened by starvation and exposure, and was hampered by the tropical monsoon downpours of the wet season. Wills died alone at a place called Breerily Waterhole on Cooper Creek in South Australia while waiting for rescue. Burke died soon after. The exact date of their deaths is unknown, but has generally been accepted to be 28 June 1861.

=== John King ===
John King was an Irish soldier who achieved fame as an Australian explorer. He was responsible for the welfare of the camels used during the Burke and Wills expedition who reached the Gulf of Carpentaria. King was the sole survivor of the four men of the expedition, and survived with the help of Aboriginal people until he was found on 15 September by Edwin Welch – the surveyor in Alfred William Howitt's Victorian Contingent Party. King returned to Melbourne and was hailed as a hero. King never fully recovered from the expedition, and died prematurely of pulmonary tuberculosis on 15 January 1872 aged 33.

=== Aidan De Brune ===
Aidan De Brune was a pseudonym of Herbert Charles Cull, who was born in London in 1874. He married in 1907, but in 1910, he left his wife and infant son Lionel, arriving in Fremantle, in October 1910. On 24 November 1920, he commenced a walk from Fremantle to Sydney, arriving in Sydney on 21 February 1921. He later worked for the Sydney Daily Mail.

One day, I wandered into Mr. Gay's offices and announced that I proposed to walk around Australia—and would he pay for articles on the trip? Mr. Gay was blunt. First he told me exactly how many kinds of fools I was to think of such a trip, then came to an agreement with business-like promptitude. Within a few hours I had gathered together what I thought necessary for an 11,000 miles trip, and had left Sydney. Two and a half years later I came to Sydney again, having in the meantime visited nearly every port on the extensive coastline. More to the point, I had proved possible a trip quite a number of Sydney wise-heads had declared to be sheer suicide.

— Aidan De Brune,

=== Bob and Bill Mossel, Sue Thompson, Annabel Douglas-Hill and Sharka Dolak ===
This walk was undertaken to raise funds for the Royal Flying Doctor Service and partly followed in the steps of the Burke & Wills Victorian Exploring Expedition, camping at some of the Burke & Wills expedition's dig trees. It is the first documented crossing of the Australian continent entirely by foot and first by a woman. A feature-length movie Feet Across Australia was shown on national television and attracted paying audiences at many venues in Australia. 1973 was a very wet season and mud was a major problem on the Birdsville Track. Food was buried along the route in advance, otherwise all equipment was carried by the 5 team members with a small handcart. A camel from Arkaroola Sanctuary was briefly part of the expedition. There was no support team accompanying the walkers.

=== Dave Kunst ===
Dave Kunst is the first person verified to have walked around the Earth. Kunst's trek began 20 June 1970 and ended 5 October 1974 (the dates in the table reflect his arrival and departure from Australia). During their travels, the brothers collected donations to UNICEF. Unfortunately, John (Dave's brother who was also walking with him) was killed when bandits shot him in the mountains of Afghanistan in October 1972. Dave was also shot in the chest during the same attack, but survived by playing dead. After spending 4 months recovering from his injuries, Dave resumed his journey along with his brother Pete, from the spot where John was killed. As they continued their travels, Dave and Pete were denied access to the USSR, so they flew from India to Australia. Pete returned home during the Australia-leg of the trek, where Dave continued on alone, by this time on his 3rd mule. Unfortunately, the mule died and Dave was left hauling his wagon of supplies himself. He was on the verge of abandoning his supplies, when he fortuitously met Jenni Samuel, a schoolteacher from Perth. She helped pull his wagon with her car, while he walked alongside. Dave returned to Australia for a year after completing his journey. Jenni and Dave later married and are still together as of 2008.

=== Aynsley Rowe ===
Aynsley completed his journey across Australia in 4 months in 1977 at the age of 52 years. He pulled a flat-bed cart with bicycle wheels either side, and extended handles that he could walk between, pulling or pushing his supplies. He raised money along the way in support of the (formerly) Crippled Children's Association. His trek was inspired by the journeys of early explorers Burke and Wills, and John McDouall Stuart. Adventures along the way included nearly being shot by a local (''Jeez mate, pulling your humped up cart you looked like an emu.") and a close encounter with a herd of brumbies during the night. The tall grasses growing right up to the roadside south of Darwin made striking camp at night difficult, with the possibility of some slithery bedfellows. He completed the journey from Mindíl Beach, Darwin, to Glenelg Beach, Adelaide, a total of 2033 miles (3271 kms). He was greeted by a representative from the Crippled Children's Association who tipped his bottle of Arafura Sea water into the Gulf St Vincent. Then he walked 16 miles home to Rostrevor, Adelaide. In 1994 Aynsley circumnavigated Australia on a Honda DIO SK50 scooter. He travelled from Adelaide, clockwise, finishing the trip in four months. He was accompanied by his brother-in-law Arthur Conway who, due to ill health, did not complete the east coast part of the trip.

=== Dennis Bartell ===
Dennis Bartell became the first person to walk across the Simpson Desert unassisted in 1984, while walking across Australia from the Gulf of Carpentaria to Gulf St Vincent. He followed the 'French Line' – a route taken by the CGG surveyor Roy Elkins 21 years prior who also completed the walk but with the assistance of a support crew. In recognition of his achievement, he was named the Australian Geographic's Adventurer of the Year in 1995.

=== Steven Newman ===
Listed in the Guinness Book of Records as the first person to walk around the world solo, Steve Newman crossed 20 countries and walked some 15,000 miles during his four-year journey. For the Australian leg, Steven flew from Bali and commenced his walk in Darwin on 1 July 1985. He travelled south along "The Track" through Alice Springs, Coober Pedy, Adelaide, and on to Melbourne. He concluded in Melbourne on 20 June 1986, before proceeding onto Vancouver for his American leg of the journey.

Steven later published a book documenting his journey in 1989 called 'Worldwalk'. The handmade cart he used to cross the deserts was named 'Roo' and is currently on display at a museum in the USA. His backpack 'Clinger' and the tattered boots he wore across Australia were temporarily displayed in the Smithsonian after his record-setting solo walk around the world was completed.

=== Roger Scott ===
Roger Scott departed from Darwin for Dover on 6 August 1988, raising funds for the Top End Life Education Centre and the NT Spastics Association. He walked via Kununurra and Halls Creek, arriving at the Eyre Bird Observatory on the southern coast of South Australia on 22 September 1988 where he encountered Ffyona Campbell on her walk across Australia. He then proceeded on to Adelaide, before catching a flight to Devonport and walking to Dover. He completed the walk in 109 days, and traversed the Great Sandy Desert, Gibson Desert, Great Victoria Desert, and Nullarbor Plain on his journey.

=== Ffyona Campbell ===
Starting from John O'Groats on the northernmost coast of Scotland in 1983, then 16-year-old Ffyona Campbell set out to walk around the world. She departed from Sydney on 11 September 1988, and arrived in Fremantle on 14 December 1988 – a journey lasting 95 days. She completed the journey with David Richard, who acted as her support crew and who waited for her every 10 miles.

Her entire journey around the world took a little over eleven years to complete. She completed 31,529 km and raised £120,000 for charity.

=== Nobby Young ===
Through 1993–94, Nobby Young became the only person to walk around mainland Australia, since Aidan de Brune accomplished the feat in 1922–1924. The 16,000-kilometre journey, which took exactly a year to complete, is listed in the Guinness Book of Records. He covered a distance of 14,900 km, while raising funds for the 'Life Education Centre'.

=== David Mason ===
In 1998, David Mason walked from Byron Bay to Dalby, where he picked up three camels that would carry his supplies. From there, he walked through the Simpson Desert to Uluru, then across the Gibson Desert to Steep Point. He completed the walk in 236 days, while raising money for the Fred Hollows Foundation. In recognition of his achievement, he was named the Australian Geographic Adventurer of the Year in 1999. David Mason wrote a book about the walk that was published in 2014 and titled Walk Across Australia: The First Solo Crossing.

=== Andrew Harper ===
In 1999, Andrew Harper followed the Tropic of Capricorn from west to east accompanied by three camels to carry his supplies. The desert sections of his journey represented pure desert travel as he did not follow any roads or tracks enabling him to keep as true to the TOC as possible. This included traverses of the Little Sandy, Gibson and Simpson Deserts. The expedition was a fundraising walk for the Royal Flying Doctor Service and as recognition for his achievement, he was admitted as a Fellow to the Royal Geographical Society.

=== Polly Letofsky ===
On 1 August 1999, Polly Letofsky left her home in Colorado on a five-year journey spanning four continents and 22 countries. She started her leg across Australia on 29 October 2000 from St Kilda Pier on Port Phillip Bay in Melbourne, and concluded on 22 July 2001 after arriving in Port Douglas. On 30 July 2004, she concluded her journey having walked over 22,730 km (14,120 mi), having raised over $250,000 for breast cancer research, and having officially become the first woman to have walked around the world.

=== Jon Muir ===
On 18 May 2001, Jon Muir walked across Australia with his dog, a Jack Russell Terrier named Seraphine, from Port Augusta to Burketown. It took him 128 days, spanning a distance of approximately 2,500 km. Jon's walk is unique in that he remained self-sufficient for food and water, hauling, gathering, or hunting all of his food for the walk. He filmed his journey and produced a documentary entitled Alone Across Australia.

=== Dave McKern ===
On 15 June 2003, McKern started his solo journey walking across Australia, from Sydney to Perth while only being accompanied by his dog Rupert, he finished on 8 November 2003 after a total of 146 days on the road covering a total of approximately 4000 km.

=== Deborah De Williams ===
Deborah Williams walked around Australia in 2003/2004. She aimed to break the record set by Nobby Young (who was also on her support team), the first person to walk around Australia back in 1993/1994. She broke the record on 23 September 2004. She is the first woman to walk completely around Australia.

=== John Olsen ===
John Olsen has walked across Australia twice, between the northern and southernmost points, and the western and easternmost points.

His first journey commenced in 2004. Olsen walked 5,622 kilometres (3,493 mi) unsupported from Cape York Peninsula to Tasmania in 167 days, and raised a little over $10,000 for a charity working with children with cerebral palsy. On 18 June 2008, John Olsen undertook his second walk, walking from Steep Point, to Cape Byron. He travelled a distance of 4,752 kilometres (2,953 mi), raising $130,000 for the Australian Lions Children's Mobility Foundation (ALCMF) and the Australian Leukodystrophy Support Group Inc (ALDS). He then walked home to Geelong after reaching Cape Byron.. The progress of Olsen's second journey was broadcast by Ian McNamara's ABC radio Australia All Over program on Sundays. Olsen completed the walk in 200 days, finishing on 3 January 2009.

Olsen's accomplishment was recognized by Sensis when it depicted him on the cover of the Geelong and Colac Yellow and White Pages directories for 2010/2011

=== Colin Ricketts ===
Colin Ricketts walked solo walk around Australia raising money for kids with cancer. He departed Adelaide on 4 January 2005, returning 15,430 km and 379 days later on 17 January 2006. He pushed a three-wheel baby jogger named 'Wilson' and followed National Highway 1 in an anti-clockwise direction.

=== Jeff Johnson ===
On 5 April 2007, Jeff Johnson walked from Port Augusta to Karumba to raise money for the DeafBlind Association of NSW. Motivated by the then recent death of his deaf-blind niece, he raised approximately $5,700 for the charity towards the purchase of a bus for transport of deaf and blind children using wheelchairs. He completed the walk in 151 days, finishing on 2 September 2007.

=== Deanna Sorensen ===
Deanna Sorensen is a Canadian veterinary nurse and motivational speaker. After leaving Perth and crossing the Nullarbor Plain, she travelled south from Port Augusta to Adelaide, along the coast through Mount Gambier to Melbourne, then up the Princes Highway through Eden to Sydney. The total distance of this route, taken from road maps and route markers, is 4895 km; with an additional 170 km of additional distance on side-roads and excursions making her total journey a little over 5000 km. She completed her journey in 180 days.

=== Michael Mitchell ===
Michael Mitchell left Cape York on 5 May 2008 on his 'Great Australian Cancer Bush Walk'. He aimed to raise $1 million for cancer research, and was motivated to act because some friends and their siblings (Mick and Maree Egan and Michael's mother, Monica) were living with cancer. He followed the National Bicentennial Trail and The Australian Alps Walking Track for a large portion of his journey.

Michael was able to raise $50,000 for the Cancer Council. The walk was completed in the aftermath of the Black Saturday bushfires. He finished on 3 May 2009 upon arriving at Wilsons Promontory.

=== Gary Hause ===
Gary Hause departed from Cairns on 19 May 2008, and arrived in Torquay on 2 November 2008. The leg across Australia was completed as part of his journey around the world on foot.

=== Dave Leaning ===
Dave Leaning walked south to north leaving Port Augusta on 28 April 2009 and arriving in Karumba on 21 July. This followed the Englishman's feat of skiing the length of Norway. The effort was made to raise funds for the Halo Trust.

=== Mike Pauly ===
Mike decided he would walk from his home in Fremantle to Federation Square in Melbourne via Coolgardie after being diagnosed with osteoarthritis in both knees as a result of being overweight, and reading of Deanna Sorenson's account of walking unsupported across the Nullarbor. He vowed to complete the walk before his 70th birthday, in a bid to raise funds and awareness for Arthritis WA.

On 16 May 2009, at sixty-nine years old, Mike set off on his lone 3617 km journey walking across the Nullarbor.

=== Dave Phoenix ===
In 2008, Dave Phoenix walked from Melbourne to Karumba following the route taken by Burke and Wills in 1860–1.

=== Mark Gibbens ===
Mark Gibbens left Perth on 22 February 2009, and arrived at Civic Park in Sydney on Monday 18 May 2009. He walked solo for 5200 km in 86 days using his mate Colin Rickett's buggy named "Wilson". Mark undertook the walk to raise money for research into cancer, and as a tribute to a close friend and mentor who died of cancer in 2007. Proceeds from Mark's walk were distributed through cancer research organizations in each state he has walked through, namely the Children's Leukaemia and Cancer Research Foundation in Western Australia, the McGuinness/McDermott Foundation in South Australia, the Victorian Prostate Research Consortium, and the Australian Cancer Research Foundation in New South Wales.

=== Leigh Thomson-Mathews ===
Leigh set off from Perth on 8 March 2010 with his brother Sam. Sydney was their original destination, but the two decided to complete their journey in Melbourne, arriving on 3 July 2010.

=== Sam Thomson-Mathews ===
Sam set off from Perth on 8 March 2010 with his brother Leigh. Sydney was their original destination, but the two decided to complete their journey in Melbourne, arriving on 3 July 2010.

=== Mike Pauly ===
In 2011, then 71-year-old Mike Pauly walked from Melbourne to Perth to raise funds for Arthritis WA. This was Mike's second walk across Australia, having previously walked from Fremantle to Melbourne in 2009. Mike completed both journeys despite suffering from Osteoarthritis in both of his knee joints.

=== Jeff Johnson ===
Jeff Johnson walked 4791 km in 2011, and raised $68,000 for the Newborn and pediatric Emergency Transport Service (NETS) in the process. This was his second walk across Australia, having recently walked from north to south in 2007.

=== Jacob French ===
Jacob French walked across Australia in 2011–2012. He completed the walk wearing the white 'Storm Trooper' armour from George Lucas' Star Wars films, and raised $88,523 for the Starlight Children's Foundation in the process.

=== Andrew Cadigan ===
Andrew "Cad" Cadigan finished a solo walk from Sydney back to Sydney in June 2012. He walked unassisted via Tasmania, Melbourne, Adelaide, Albany, Perth, Broome, Darwin, Townsville, and Brisbane. Cadigan undertook the walk in honor of Chris Simpson, a friend who had died from complications related to myelodysplasia, and raised over $65,000 – $25,000 for The Cancer Council and $40,000 for the Leukemia Foundation. Shortly after completing the walk, while holidaying and recuperating in Thailand, Cadigan suffered head injuries in a motorcycle accident, and later died in hospital in Sydney, on 5 October 2012. A book, written by his author father Neil, about his walk and tragic death was released in 2014. The Leukemia Foundation has struck a research PhD into myelodysplasia, named in honour of Cadigan and Simpson, with a trust called Cad's Cause continuing to raise funds.

=== Matt Napier ===
On 2 February 2013, Matt Napier set off from Perth to walk to Sydney via Adelaide, Melbourne, and Canberra to raise awareness of Global Poverty. Matt's walk was unique in that he bounced an AFL football the whole way to symbolize the important role sport plays in alleviating extreme poverty around the world. Matt went through 6 footballs on his trip and was assisted by his wife Wendy who was his support crew. They finished their 4,501 km journey in Sydney live on Channel Seven's Sunrise Program on 28 June. The trip came on the back of Matt Cycling from Perth to Canberra (3908 km) the year before to also raise awareness about world poverty.

=== Brendon Alsop ===
On 21 February 2013, Brendon Alsop set off, with his dog Jojo, from Geelong to walk around Australia on the Fatmans Great Aussie Trek. Motivated to lose weight, Alsop walked unaided, pushing a pram, up the East Coast of Australia. With resources running out, he amended his destination to Cairns and completed his 4000 km trek when he dived into the Lagoon in Cairns on the morning of 3 January 2014. Losing 35 kg and raising $12000 for the Australian Cancer Research Foundation and the Andrew Love Cancer Centre in Geelong. Alsop dedicated his trek to friends and family members who had lost their lives to cancer. The trek was followed by his mother, Beth Alsop, who died of cancer 34 days after Alsop completed it.

=== Scott Loxley ===
On 2 November 2013, Scott Loxley left Melbourne and began walking solo around Australia covering every state and territory wearing a Star Wars Sandtrooper costume.

Scott Loxley officially crossed the finish line on Monday 15 June 2015 at the Monash Children's Hospital, after over 15,000 km of walking around Australia to raise funds which exceeded $110,000.

=== Gary Wilmot ===
Wilmot devised a plan for a run and walk between his home course at Canning River via Adelaide, Melbourne, Canberra, and Sydney, visiting other parkrun courses where practical and finish in South Bank, Queensland.

His aim to raise awareness and much-needed funds for the Heart Foundation was a success. His two-man support crew were Ben Sutton and Ols Nicholls.

Wilmot left Perth on 16 May 2015, and arrived in Brisbane on 17 September 2015 with a celebratory "free 5k run" taking place on 19 September.

=== John Olsen ===
John Olsen walked diagonally across Australia to honor the memory of his late wife Vida, and to raise awareness and funds for leukodystrophy which claimed her life in 2014.

Olsen departed from Cape York Peninsula on 31 March 2016, and trekked diagonally across Australia through Alice Springs before finishing in Cape Leeuwin on Christmas Eve 2016.

In excess of $40k in donations was raised for Leukodystrophy Australia.

=== Ashok Alexander ===
Ashok Alexander, who is an IT professional and businessman by trade, decided to walk from Darwin to Canberra to "highlight unfair business practices".

He took about five and a half-month to cover a distance of 4,032 km made of 5,771,768 steps to finally reached Canberra Parliament House on 27 September 2017, to coincide with his older son's birthday, who also walked with him the initial three days.

=== Tristan Harris ===
Tristan "Banger" Harris is a former sailor serving over 27 years in the Royal Australian Navy as a paramedic. He walked across Australia from Ocean to Ocean in 2017 raising funds for Legacy Australia. Departing on 1 May 2017 from HMAS Stirling, Garden Island WA completing the journey on 31 October 2017 at HMAS Creswell, Jervis Bay he walked solo, carrying all food, water and shelter in a child walker. The walk took 184 days, walking 4,358 kilometres and raised over $15,500 for Legacy along the way.

=== Terra Roam ===
On 2 May 2018, Terra Roam became the first non-binary adventurer to walk 17,200 kilometres solo unsupported around Australia. It took four years in sections divided between seasons and injuries. The first section was a 1,250 kilometres "warm up" lap around Tasmania carrying a backpack. The following three sections Roam pushed a custom built barrow they designed and named Dory, with a carrying capacity of 200L for the outback. When Roam reached the east coast they switched back to a backpack for the remaining distance to get away from roads and take the scenic tracks and paths through national parks, state forests and beaches. Not all their breaks were planned, when a truck driver tried running them down from behind on the Barkly Highway they took time off to recover from the trauma and adjusted their route to leave that region. When injuries to their feet and pelvic imbalance were beginning to cause blackouts they took a six month break for rehabilitation and after a fall broke and dislocated their ankle only 900 kilometres from completing their lap they were forced to take another six months off. Longest walking day was 67 km, outback average was 45 km/day, east coast average was 20 km/day. 20 pairs of shoes including five pairs of thongs for 2,500 kilometres because they couldn't afford shoes. Hottest day was 45'C, coldest night was −5'C, most water drunk in one day was 10L. Roam walked through two cyclones, two floods, an earthquake, fires, fly plague, heatwaves and a blizzard, faced death threats from a stalker, fought off a wild dog attack and survived attempted murder.

=== Alwyn Dolan ===
For 12 months, Alwyn Doolan walked from Cape York in Queensland to Parliament House in Canberra with the intention of delivering a message to the federal government on reconciliation. After his 8,500 kilometre journey, Gooreng Gooreng and Wakka Wakka man Alywin Doolan hoped that he would pass on his message sticks to Prime Minister Scott Morrison.

Unfortunately, his open invitation for the Prime Minister to meet with him was declined. Doolan planned to walk back to Woorabinda in Central Queensland, roughly 1,500 kilometres away, with three message sticks still in tow.

=== Bob Hanley ===
61-year-old Bob Hanley was of failing health and his doctor predicted that he would soon need to use a wheelchair due to advanced spondylitis, with the prospects of not much more than six months to enjoy life at any level. Rather than taking life easy as directed, Hanley set out on a walk around Australia, pushing a wheelbarrow. He was recognised by the Guinness Book of World Records as the holder of the record for the world's longest walk pushing a wheelbarrow, 14,500 kilometres in a few days longer than three years.

=== Marc Schinkel ===
Marc Schinkel completed his unassisted walk across Australia as a meditation practice inspired by the Buddhist monks of Mount Hiei. He tracked his daily efforts using a Garmin triathlon watch and uploaded the GPS, heart rate as well as other biometric data to each point on a Google map for his family and friends to view as he progressed.

Marc was interviewed by Heather Ewart during his crossing of the Nullarbor Plain and appeared in the ABC's TV show Back Roads, Series 6 Episode 2, Nullarbor (Part 2) – Turning Back Time. He completed his walk with a 111 kilometres ultra-marathon from Northam to Cottesloe Beach over 1 and 2 November 2019 after failing to cross the continent twice before succeeding on his third attempt.

=== Ivor Houston ===
Ivor Houston walked solo and unsupported across Australia to raise money and awareness for refugees in Australia. Born and raised in the Blue Mountains and hosting a Malaysian family for the last 18 months, Houston has a close experience with the problems Australians have at assisting refugees and asylum seekers. His fundraising was donated to Act for Peace and Blue Mountains Refugee Support Group. Houston is also the youngest person recorded to have walked solo and unsupported across Australia at the age of 22 upon completion.

=== Nicolo Guarrera ===
Nicolo Guarrera walked from Sydney to Adelaide and from Adelaide to Darwin in 2023, covering a distance of more than 5500 kilometres. He followed the Mid-Western Highway for the first section of his walk, then Sturt Highway until Adelaide. From the capital of South Australia, he walked north along the Oodnadatta track and Stuart Highway, taking a deviation on the Lasseter Highway while heading to Uluru. He then walked the Mereenie Loop until Alice Springs. The last part of his journey was along the Stuart Highway, until he reached Darwin and the Indian Ocean on 7 September 2023. His walk in Australia is part of a broad project to walk around the world. Before Australia, he had already walked across Western Europe and South America. He left his home on 9 August 2020 and by September 2023 he walked a total distance of 20 kilometres.

=== Tom Fremantle ===
Tom Fremantle walked from Swanbourne Beach, Perth, to Bondi Beach, Sydney as part of "Tom's World Walk" walk around the world. Tom completed his walk unsupported, pushing his buggy Koko the whole way, carrying all his equipment and supplies. Tom covered a total of 17,615 kilometres on the world walk and has raised over £45,000 during his world walk for a number of charities.

=== Kentaro Jin ===
Kentaro Jin walked from the west coast of Australia to the east coast as "Catman". He reached his ultimate goal of the Sydney Opera House on 14 March 2026.

== See also ==
- List of long-distance hiking tracks in Australia
- List of people who have run across Australia
- List of people who have walked across Canada
- List of people who have walked across the United States
- Transcontinental walk
- Twenty-first-century fundraising walks in Tasmania
