= Nedd Brockmann =

Australian ultramarathon athlete

- Born: 1998 or 1999; Forbes, New South Wales, Australia

Nedd Robert Brockmann (born 1998 or 1999) is an Australian ultramarathon athlete, motivational speaker, and former electrician from Forbes, New South Wales. He became notable for running across Australia in 2022, taking 47 days from coast to coast. As of October 2024 he is the joint third fastest person to run across Australia laterally.

== Early life ==
Nedd Robert Brockmann was born in 1998 or 1999 in Forbes, New South Wales.

== Fundraising ==
In October 2022, Brockmann completed a 3,952 km run from Perth’s Cottesloe Beach across the country to Sydney's Bondi Beach in 47 days. During this time he raised A$2.6 million for homelessness. In July 2024, a documentary film titled Nedd Brockmann: Runn was released, about his mission to make a difference as he ran across Australia raising money for homelessness. As of October 2024 he is the joint third fastest person to run across Australia laterally.

In October 2024, Brockmann completed a 1600-km (1000-mile ) run over 12 days to raise money for a homelessness charity, raising a total of A$3 million. He was attempting to break the world record set by Greek ultra runner Yiannis Kourous of just under 10 and a half days in 1988. Brockmann completed 3,760 laps of the track at Sydney Olympic Park in 12 days, 13 hours, 16 minutes, and 45 seconds.

In September 2024, Brockmann founded a chocolate milk company Nedd's Milk with a goal to raise $10 million dollars for homelessness charity We Are Mobilise. The business closed in May 2026, with Brockmann citing a highly competitive dairy industry which had become too difficult to sustain.

== Publications and speaking engagements ==
Brockmann has released two books.

In October 2023 his first book Showing Up: Get Comfortable Being Uncomfortable tells the story of a 23-year-old tradie who put his body "through hell and back 10 times" to prove that anything is possible when you break past your own barriers.

In 2024 he published a second book, Fire Up: Live Large, Do Tough Stuff and Give Back, in which he shares some of the lessons he has learned from the first 25 years of his life.

== Awards and nominations ==
Year	Award	Result
2022	Social Force GQ Men of the Year Award	Won
2024	NSW Young Australian of the Year	Nominated
2026	NSW Young Australian of the Year	Won
2026	Young Australian of the Year	Won

== See also ==
- List of people who have run across Australia
