= David Foster (woodchopper) =

Australian champion woodchopper

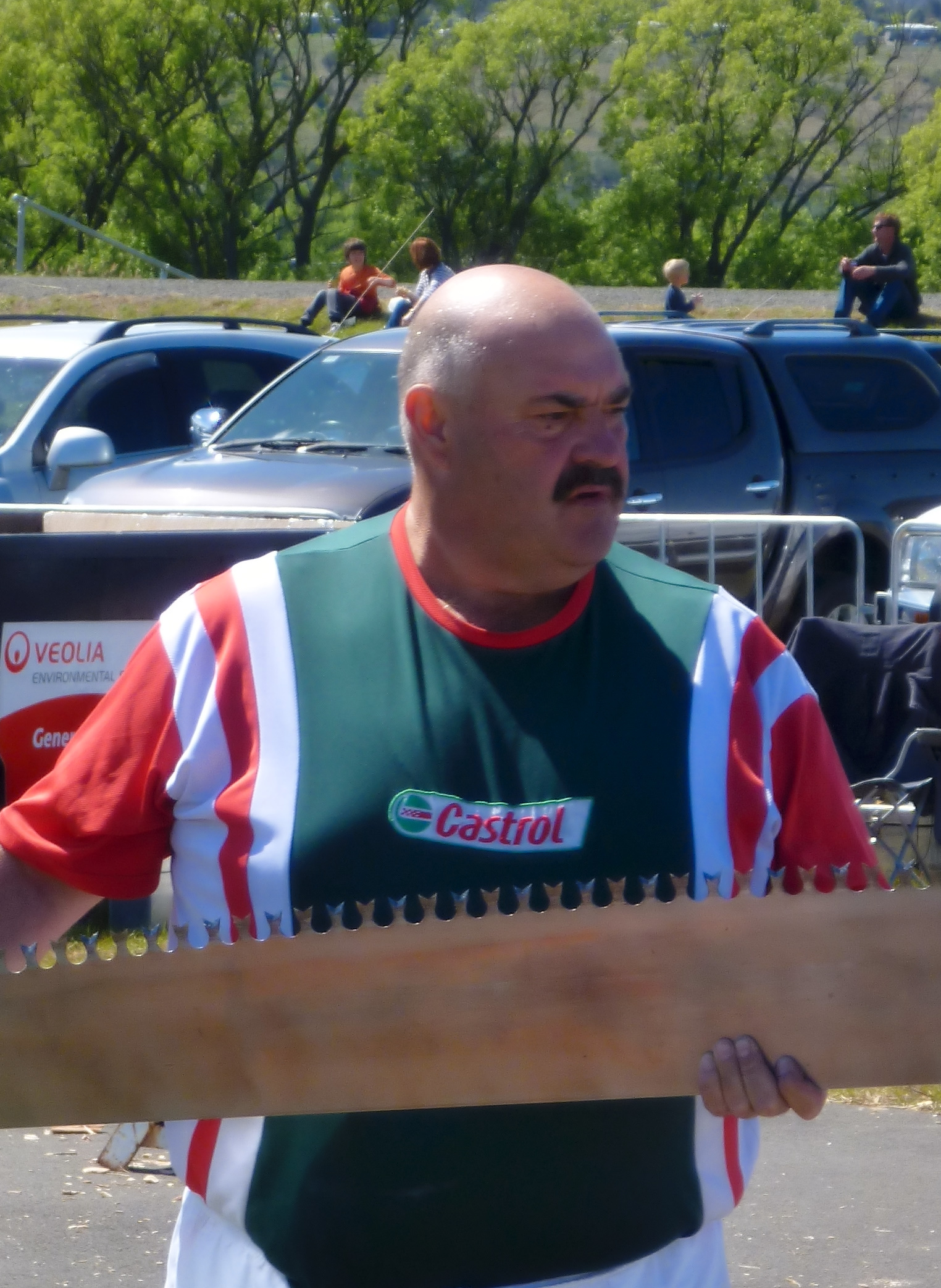
Foster at the Launceston Show in 2012

David George Foster OAM (born 20 March 1957) is an Australian world champion woodchopper, and Tasmanian community figure. He held the World 600 mm Double-handed Sawing Championship title at Sydney Royal Easter Show for 21 consecutive years, and is Australia's most successful athlete and first and possibly the only athlete in any sport in the world to win over 1,000 titles.

== Athletic career ==
He started woodchopping with his father, George Foster, in 1978, and between them they won the World 600 mm Double-handed Sawing Championship eleven years running. He and his brother Peter Foster continued competing and winning this event for another ten years, until 1999, making David a world champion 21 years running. They lost in 2000, but re-gained the championship in 2001, after which David's son Stephen took over as his wood chopping partner.

His other achievements in wood chopping include winning the Australian Axeman of the Year award nine times in a row, winning every major wood chopping event in Australia and New Zealand, becoming the first person in sporting history to have won 1,000 championships and being the only axeman to have ever won six out of seven championships at the Sydney Royal Easter Show.

The Australian Axeman's Hall of Fame in Latrobe, Tasmania, was operated by Foster and his wife Jan from 2004 until 2006.

== Other activities ==
Foster is often joined in his charitable quests by the Launceston cricketer David Boon. Both Foster and Boon, as well as then-Premier of Tasmania Jim Bacon, also willingly allowed their famous moustaches to be shaved off for charity.

Foster has written a book called The Power Of Two. He became a supporter of same sex marriage, following his daughter coming out to him.

== Honours ==
Foster has received several awards for his cultural, charitable and community activities. These include being awarded an Order of Australia Medal, a commendation from the then Governor of Tasmania Sir Phillip Bennett and an Anzac Medal for services to the community. He also received a Tasmanian of the Year award in 1995, and was appointed a director of the National Australia Day Council in 1998. In 2020, he was inducted into the Sport Australia Hall of Fame.

== Personal life ==
Foster is married to Jan Foster and has four children. Following his wife's illness, he was forced to quit management of the Australian Axeman's Hall of Fame at Latrobe. In 2014, he announced plans to leave Tasmania following an offer by Camden Council (New South Wales) to set up a multimillion-dollar tourist attraction focused on his memorabilia after Tasmanian businesses and government rejected proposals for a similar attraction in Tasmania. However, he remained in Tasmania after being signed as the spokesman for OneCare, a Tasmanian aged care provider.
