= Tasmanian of the Year =

Tasmanian of the Year Awards is an award given to the most outstanding Tasmanian in any given year. The Awards are made by the Tasmania Committee Incorporated and is organised and funded with government support. It was first awarded in 1985.

The following is a list of recipients of the Tasmanian of the Year award:

Year of award	Name	Comments
1985	Don Calvert	Admiral's Cup Yachtman
1986	Ivan James	Buyout of Repco
1987	Christine Hiller	Artist
1988	Bob Clifford	Ship construction and design, founder Incat
1989	Shirley McCarron	Mersey Valley Music Festival
1990		Not Awarded
1991	Annie Ellis	Yo Yo Fashion Designs
1992	John Allwright	Farmer
1993	Joanne Cornish	Miss Australia
1994	Tim O'Shannessey	Champion Cyclist
1995	David Foster	Champion Axeman
1996	Fiona Taylor	National President, Canteen
1997	Prof. Nigel Forteath	Aquaculture
1998	Graeme Milburn OAM	Charity Cyclist
1999		Not Awarded
2000		Not Awarded
2001		Not Awarded
2002		Not Awarded
2003	Ric Paterson OAM	ABC Radio announcer
2004	Simon Currant	Tourism Developer, Chairman Tourism Industry Council of Tasmania
2005	Ben Kearney	Anti-plastic campaigner
2006		Not Awarded
2007	Anne Steele	Marathon Swimmer
2008	Bruce Englefield	Tasmanian Devil advocate

The Tasmanian of the Year award doesn't appear to have been awarded since 2008, and the Tasmanian Committee Inc., website is no longer active. Later references to the "Tasmanian of the Year" may refer to the Tasmanian Australian of the Year award.

== Tasmanian Australian of the Year ==
This is the Tasmanian finalist for Australian of the Year, also known as the TAS State Recipient Australian of the Year.

Year of award	Name	Comments
2004	Michael Kent AM	Businessman, politician and sports executive
2005	David Foster OAM	Champion woodchopper
2006	Richard Bovill	Leader in Tasmania's rural community
2007	Dr John Tooth OAM	Dementia care pioneer
2008	Ken Gourlay	World record sailor
2009	Peter Cundall AM	Gardening expert
2010	Bruce Englefield	Tasmanian Devil advocate
2011	Deborah De Williams	Breast cancer fundraiser
2012	Robert Pennicott	Tourism entrepreneur, conservationist, philanthropist
2013	Andrew Hughes	Adventure teacher
2014	Professor Thomas McMeekin AO	Food microbiologist
2015	Rodney Croome AM	Equality activist
2016	Jane Hutchinson	Conservationist
2017	Rosalie Martin	Speech pathologist working to rehabilitate people in the justice system
2018	Scott Rankin	Theatre director, writer and arts charity leader
2019	Bernadette Black GAICD	Founder of the Brave Foundation to support teenage parents
2020	Dr Jess Melbourne-Thomas	Marine, Antarctic and climate scientist
2021	Grace Tame	Advocate for survivors of sexual assault
2022	Craig Leeson	Documentary filmmaker and journalist
2023	John Kamara	Migrants advocate
2024	Stephanie Trethewey	Rural women's advocate and founder, Motherland
2025	Sam Elsom	Founder, Sea Forest
2026	Dr Jorian Kippax	Emergency doctor
