= Twenty-first-century fundraising walks in Tasmania =

Since its settlement by Europeans, Tasmania has been traversed in many ways, often going unrecorded.

In the 21st century, some people have created and recorded their journeys around the island as events for publicity and fund raising, with most walks mentioned here in the latter category.

A north–south crossing of Australia may also include walking around Tasmania, known as a 'traversal crossing'.

Historically, the sheer volume of people walking or traversing the island in a number of ways is not traceable. Some noted nineteenth-century ventures around the island before proper roads included such ventures of the walks of Thomas Bather Moore and the Walk to the West, which involved substantial logistic issues due to terrain and lack of support.

== Twenty-first-century ventures ==
The claims of these ventures in no way should be considered firsts, as in most cases earlier walks of substantially more difficult circumstances were never recorded in this manner. Also most walks and walkers are on made roads.

Name	Age	Nationality	Start date	Finish date	Duration	Distance	Starting location	Finishing location	Route
Christopher Neil "Earth-Walk Man" Linton	51	New Zealand	1 April 2015	20 April 2015	20 days	552.5 km	Port Arthur	Devonport	Coastal
Kelvyn Charles Yong-Hyeon Linton	14	New Zealand	1 April 2015	20 April 2015	20 days	552.5 km	Port Arthur	Devonport	Coastal
Hardy James "Jimmy" Harrington	20	Australia	3 May 2014	9 May 2015	06 days	255 km	Devonport	Hobart	Traversal
Scott Loxley	48	Australia	3 Nov 2013	22 Nov 2013	20 days	255 km	Devonport	Hobart	Traversal
John Olsen	??	Australia	Data Needed	2014	??	255 km	Devonport	Hobart	Traversal
Andrew "Cad" Cadigan	??	Australia	Data Needed	2012	??	255 km	Devonport	Hobart	Traversal
Colin Ricketts	47	Australia	3 Feb 2005	11 Feb 2005	09 days	255 km	Hobart	Devonport	Traversal

=== Christopher and Kelvyn Linton ===
Kelvyn Charles Yong-Hyeon Linton and his father Christopher Neil Linton walked across Tasmania, in 2015 to raise funds for mood disorders. They backpacked the entire coastal route, although they did accept some offers of food and hospitality along the way. Kelvyn was 14 years old at the time, making him the youngest person to have walked across Tasmania, at that time. This was also the first father-son team to complete the journey. His father went on to complete a walk around the perimeter of Tasmania, becoming the first person to do so.

=== Hardy James "Jimmy" Harrington ===
Hardy James "Jimmy" Harrington walked around Tasmania, in 2014 to raise funds for child cancer. He left Melbourne on the Spirit of Tasmania to Devonport on 2 May, departing Devonport toward Hobart on 3 May. His route took him through Deloraine to Launceston, through the Epping Forest to Ross, to Oatlands, past Bagdad and into Hobart on 9 May. He then rested in Hobart a day then went back to Devonport and departed once again on the Spirit of Tasmania back to Melbourne (11 May). James was 20 years old at the time.

=== Scott Loxley ===
Scott Loxley walked across Tasmania, in 2013 to raise funds for he Monash Children's Hospital. He left Melbourne on the Spirit of Tasmania to Devonport on 2 November departing Devonport toward Hobart on 3 November. His route took him through Deloraine to Launceston, down the through the Epping Forest to Ross, to Oatlands, past Bagdad and into Hobart on 22 November. b

=== John Olsen ===
John Olsen has walked across Australia twice, between the northern and southernmost points, and the western and easternmost points. His first crossing included crossing Tasmania.

His first journey commenced in 2004. John walked 5,622 km unsupported from Cape York to Tasmania in 167 days, and raised a little over $10,000 for a charity working with children with cerebral palsy. On 18 June 2008, John Olsen undertook his second walk, walking from Steep Point, to Cape Byron. He travelled a distance 4752 km, raising $130,000 for the Australian Lions Children's Mobility Foundation (ALCMF) and the Australian Leukodystrophy Support Group Inc (ALDS). The disparity in distance is due to John walking back to his home in Geelong after reaching Cape Byron. Both the ALCMF and ALDS help children with progressive degenerative brain disease, which gives rise to mobility problems. The progress of John's second journey was broadcast by Ian McNamara's ABC radio's ‘Australia All Over’ program on Sundays. John completed the walk in 200 days, finishing on 3 January 2009.

John's accomplishment was recognised by Sensis when they depicted him on the cover of the local (Geelong and Colac) Yellow and White Pages directories for 2010/2011

=== Andrew "Cad" Cadigan ===
Andrew "Cad" Cadigan finished a solo walk from Sydney back to Sydney in June 2012. He walked unassisted via Tasmania, Melbourne, Adelaide, Albany, Perth, Broome, Darwin, Townsville, and Brisbane. Cadigan undertook the walk in honour of Chris Simpson, a friend who had died from complications related to myelodysplasia, and raised over $65,000 - $25,000 for The Cancer Council and $40,000 for the Leukemia Foundation. Shortly after completing the walk, whilst holidaying and recuperating in Thailand, Cadigan suffered head injuries in a motorcycle accident, and later died in hospital in Sydney, on 5 October 2012. A book, written by his author father Neil, about his walk and tragic death was released in 2014. The Leukemia Foundation has struck a research PHD into myelodysplasia, named in honour of Cadigan and Simpson, with a trust called Cad's Cause continuing to raise funds.

=== Colin Ricketts ===
Colin Ricketts walked around Australia raising money for kids with cancer. He departed Adelaide on 4 January 2005, returning 15,430 km and 379 days later on 17 January 2006. He pushed a three-wheel baby-jogger named 'Wilson' and followed National Highway 1 in an anti-clockwise direction. Colin incorporated a Tasmania crossing from Hobart to Devonport as part of his walk.

== See also ==
- List of people who have walked across Australia
- List of people who have run across Australia
- List of people who have walked across Canada
- List of people who have walked across the United States
