= Serge Girard =

French ultramarathon runner

Serge Girard is a French ultramarathon runner born in 1953. He fulfilled the challenge of running across five continents in 434 days.

He is related to French hurdler Patricia Girard-Léno.

== Achievements ==
- 1997: trans-United States (Los Angeles to New York City) – 4,597 km in 52 days, 23 hours, 20 min (former master's world record, beaten by Marshall Ulrich; world record holder is Frank Giannino Jr.)
- 1999: trans-Australia (Perth/Sydney) – 3,755 km in 46 days, 23 hours, 12 min (former world record, beaten by Achim Heukemes)
- 2001: trans-South America (Lima/Rio de Janeiro) - 5,235 km in 73 days, 3 hours, 40 min (world record)
- 2003–2004: trans-Africa (Dakar/Cairo) - 8,295 km in 123 days, 2 hours, 40 min (world record)
- 2005–2006: trans-Eurasia (Paris/Tokyo-) - 19,097 km in 262 days (probably world only attempt)
- 2009–2010: one year: 27,011 km in 365 days (world record)
