= Ron Grant (runner) =

Australian long-distance runner

Ronald Moreton Grant OAM (born 1943) is an Australian long-distance runner.

== Running ==
In 1983, Ron Grant ran 13,383 km (8,316 mi) around Australia in 217 days. He completed the run anticlockwise, starting in Brisbane, then Townsville, Mount Isa, Darwin, Perth, Adelaide, Melbourne, Sydney and back to Brisbane. Grant maintained an overall daily average of 61.67 km (38.32 mi), and was the first person to do it solo.

== Recognition ==
Grant was named Queensland Sportsman of the Year in 1983.

He was named Queenslander of the Year in 1984.

He received a Medal of the Order of Australia in 1984.

== See also ==
- List of people who have run across Australia
