= Global Run: Alay sa Pilipino at sa Buong Mundo =

Fundraiser run

The Global Run: Alay sa Pilipino at sa Buong Mundo (English:Global Run: A Tribute to All Filipinos around the Globe) is a fund raising run started by Filipino runner Cesar Guarin. The run is consist of 14 stages encompassing all continents but Antarctica and South America. The run is set to be completed by 2016. If successful, Cesar Guarin will be the first Filipino, first Asian and fourth person to run around the world

== Completed Stages ==
Stage	Countries	Starting location	Finishing location	ref.
Trans Pilipinas	Philippines	(Philippines) Baguio	(Philippines) Zamboanga City	
Trans Europe	Spain, France, Belgium, Germany, Switzerland, Italy	Spain	Italy	
USA-Canada	United States, Canada	United States	Canada	
Trans Australia	Australia	(Australia) Melbourne	(Australia) Brisbane	
Finland-England	Finland, Sweden, Norway, Scotland, Wales, England	(Finland) Helsinki	(England) London	
Trans Middle East	United Arab Emirates, Bahrain, Qatar, Saudi Arabia, Kuwait	(United Arab Emirates) UAE	(Kuwait) KUW	
Trans USA	United States	(United States) New York	(United States) Santa Monica	

== Ongoing Stage ==
Stage	Countries	Starting location	Finishing location	ref.
-	-	-	-	

== Planned Stages ==
Stage	Countries
Finland-Moscow	Finland, Russia
Austria-Greece	Austria, Hungary, Romania, Bulgaria, Greece
Finland-Moscow	Finland, Russia
Egypt-Jordan	Egypt, Israel, Jordan
Japan-Korea	Japan, South Korea
India-Myanmar	India, Bangladesh, Myanmar
Thailand-Singapore	Thailand, Singapore
Brunei-Philippines	Brunei, Philippines
