= Deborah De Williams =

Australian ultramarathon runner

Deborah De Williams AM
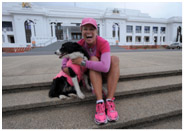
- Deborah De Williams
- Born: Deborah Anne Cook; 10 September 1969 (age 57); Perth, Western Australia
- Education: Monash University
- Occupation: Ultra-marathon athlete
- Known for: First woman to walk around Australia; First woman to run around Australia
- Website: deborahdewilliams.com.au

Deborah Anne De Williams AM (born 10 September 1969) is an Australian ultra-marathon athlete. She is the first woman to walk around Australia and the first woman to run around Australia.

== Biography ==
Deborah De Williams was born in Perth, Western Australia. In 1997, De Williams graduated from Monash University with a Bachelor of Arts (Fine Arts). In the same year she married Glyn Martin Williams and changed her surname to De Williams.

In 2001, De Williams participated in her first ultra marathon. In Oct 2004, De Williams became the first female to walk around Australia raising funds for Kids Helpline and broke Nobby Young's record for the longest continuous walk, walking 16,825 km in 365 days. In March 2006, the same day De Williams ran in the Commonwealth Games Queen Baton Relay in Melbourne she was diagnosed with breast cancer. After treatment, De Williams founded the charity Running Pink and embarked on another circumnavigation of Australia on foot, to raise funds for the National Breast Cancer Foundation.

In May 2011, De Williams became the first female to run continuously around Australia. She broke Sarah Fulcher's record for the longest continuous run by a female, running 18026.4 km in 408 days. De Williams is the only person who has both run and walked around Australia.

In Nov 2010, De Williams was awarded Tasmanian Australian of the Year 2010 by the National Australia Day Council for her athletic achievements and fundraising efforts. In Jan 2015, De Williams was awarded a Member of the Order of Australia, for significant service to the community through contributions to a range of cancer support organisations, and to ultra marathon running.

== Walking ==
On 17 October 2003, De Williams left Melbourne, Victoria to attempt to become the first female to walk around Australia and to break the longest continuous walk record set by Nobby Young in 1993/1994. Under the rules of the continuous walk record, the athlete must travel the whole distance on foot, and must walk every day, with a minimum daily requirement of 20 kilometres. During her walk, De Williams walked in a clockwise direction, mainly following the National Highway 1, route. On 23 September 2004, at 4.45am (AEST), in Martin Place, Sydney, De Williams after walking 15,644 km in 343 days broke Nobby Young's previous 1994 record for the longest continuous walk. De Williams continued to walk back to Melbourne where on 15 October 2004, after walking 16,925 km in 365 days, De Williams established a new world walk record and become the first female to walk continuously around Australia.

== Running ==
On 25 October 2008, De Williams set out from Hobart, Tasmania to run continuously around Australia and to break Sarah Fulcher's record for the longest continuous run by a female. Under the rules of the continuous run record, the athlete must travel the whole distance on foot and is required to run every day, no days off, with a minimum daily requirement of 20 kilometres. During her run, De Williams ran in an anti-clockwise direction, mainly following the National Highway 1. The run raised funds for the National Breast Cancer Foundation. After tripping and sustaining an injury to her feet, on 6 June 2009 at GPS co-ordinates S 13° 03.130' E 131°06.663', De Williams ended her attempt to run around Australia after 224 days and 10,824.8 km. De Williams had raised over $100,000 for the National Breast Cancer foundation and became the first female to run from Hobart to Darwin.

On 27 March 2010, after recovering from surgery to both feet, De Williams started her second attempt from Hobart. De Williams ran in the opposite direction from her first attempt, travelling clockwise through Victoria, South Australia, Western Australia and the Northern Territory. On 4 October 2010, at 5.35am (ACST) after running 192 days and 8839.4 km De Williams reached GPS co-ordinates S 13° 03.130' E 131°06.663' the point where she had abandoned her run in 2009. At this point De Williams became the first female to run around Australia, non–continuously. De Williams continued back down the east coast of Australia, along the same route she travelled on her first attempt. During her run De Williams experienced extreme heat, a tropical cyclone on Christmas Day 2010 in Townsville and the 2010-2011 Queensland Floods. On 6 May 2011, at 1.12pm (AEST) after running 17925 km in 405 days, at GPS co-ordinates S 42° 46.435' E 147°07.591', De Williams broke Sarah Fulcher's 21-year record for the longest continuous run by a female. De Williams ran a total of 18026.4 km in 408 days to achieve a new record for the longest continuous run by a female and is also the first female to run continuously around Australia.

During both attempts to run around Australia, De Williams raised over $200,000 for breast cancer research.

== Local government ==
De Williams was elected to Sorell Council in 2014, and served as a sitting councilor until 2022.

== Other achievements ==
- October 2005, 1st female and 2nd overall, Adelaide Self-Transcendence National 12-Hour Championships.
- December 2005, Winner Solo Handicap, Bruny Island 64 km Ultra Marathon.
- November 2004, Under 35 Australian 6-day walking record.
- March – April 2007, De Williams and fellow ultra marathon friend Vlastik Skivril ran 1270 km around Tasmania in 25 days.
- January 2015, Awarded the Member of the Order of Australia, for significant service to the community through contributions to a range of cancer support organisations, and to ultra marathon running.
- March 2013, Tasmanian Honour Roll of Women - Inductee for Service to the Community, Sport and Recreation
- September 2012, Tasmanian Pride of Australia - Courage Medal.
- March 2012, Endurance Fundraiser of the Year Award 2011, National Breast Cancer Foundation, 2011 Patron Awards.
- January 2012, nominee, National Trust of Australia, Australian Living Treasures.
- October 2011, Tasmanian Community Achievement Awards – Outstanding Achiever Award.
- November 2010, Tasmanian Australian of the Year 2011.
- November 2004, Cliff Young Award for most courageous athlete.

== Bibliography ==
- Norris, Megan (2012). "Running Pink: The Deborah De Williams Story", Five Mile Press. ISBN 9781743006894
