= Joe "Tiger" Patrick II =

American Army soldier of the Gulf War

Joe "Tiger" Patrick
- Born: July 30, 1963 (age 62)
- Allegiance: United States
- Branch: United States Army
- Rank: Private

Joe "Tiger" Patrick II (born July 30, 1963) is a Peace Dale, Rhode Island Army veteran. During his almost 10 years in uniform, Patrick served in Operation Desert Storm. After the 9/11 attacks, Patrick volunteered for three weeks at Ground Zero. During the time at Ground Zero, Patrick developed an affinity for firefighters. In 2011 Patrick completed a memorial walk. The purpose was to honor the families and loved ones of those lost, as well as the first responders in the 9/11 attacks. Patrick has walked across the United States to increase awareness of the U.S. service member casualties resulting from the war in Afghanistan and Iraq, the journey took approximately six months and began in April 2013.

== Walks ==
In 2011, when diagnosed with a degenerative liver disease that will gradually cause his health to deteriorate, Patrick was inspired to begin walking. He gained weight in preparation for the walk in 2013, and plans to complete one final walk after the war has ended and the memorial panel has been updated one last time. He plans to walk to Washington, D.C. from his home in Rhode Island and present the memorial panel to the United States Department of Veterans Affairs.

=== Walk for people lost in 9/11 attacks ===
In memory of the 10-year anniversary of the 9/11 attack on the World Trade Center in New York City, Patrick walked 650 miles (1,050 km) from the Pentagon Memorial to the Flight 93 National Memorial in Shanksville, Pennsylvania and averaged 20 miles (32 km) per day. The walk took five weeks. His original plan to walk incognito changed when he created a harness to aid him in the transport of the American flag. He carried three of them, rotating them each day. His intention was to deliver one flag to each of the crash sites. An attempt to present one at the Pentagon was futile. It was then that he called his congressman and made arrangements to have the flag delivered at a later date. After presenting a flag in Shanksville, Patrick was presented with a flag by the Shanksville fire chief to be presented to the World Trade Center.

He met many people along the way who wanted to reward him for what he was doing, but he told them he was not doing it for recognition but, rather, to finish what he had started in September 2011. He began the walk on 8 August 2011 and completed it on 10 September 2011 ending at the Ground Zero 9/11 memorial. Upon arrival at Ground Zero he presented Engine 54 Ladder 4 Battalion 9's house, Midtown Firehouse in New York, with a fire coat that had been signed by more than 300 firefighters along the way. Midtown Firehouse lost 15 firefighters in the September 11 attacks. He finished in time to attend the services that were held on 11 September 2011 in memory of the 9/11 attacks. Upon returning home to Rhode Island, Patrick was greeted by nearly 100 Elks Lodge and community members standing by a West Kingston Fire Station truck.

=== Walk for U.S. service members killed in the war ===
Patrick, carrying a memorial panel that he created, is walking alone across the country, an endeavor that he is calling "Faces of our Fallen". Patrick's journey began in San Diego, California and he plans to conclude at the Walter Reed National Military Medical Center in Bethesda, Maryland. The panel displays images of 6,655 U.S. service members who were killed while fighting the global war on terrorism in Iraq and Afghanistan.

Patrick began his latest walk on 27 April 2013 with a public display of the mosaic memorial panel that accompanies him cross country. The local Veterans of Foreign Wars (VFW) Post 5447 Imperial Beach was the starting point for this journey. Patrick selected this start point in recollection of the many Navy Seals stationed at the nearby Naval Amphibious Base on Coronado Island. This Naval Amphibious Base suffered multiple casualties before and during Operation Enduring Freedom, Operation Iraqi Freedom, and Operation New Dawn. On 29 April 2013 in Imperial Beach County, San Diego, California, Patrick started his cross country journey carrying the 200-square-foot (19 m^{2}) panel. He spreads out the panel to display the faces of the service men and women killed in combat, each time he stops. In addition to the panel, he is carrying a bat used by Dustin Pedroia (Boston Red Sox second baseman). Along the way, wounded veterans are given the opportunity to autograph the bat, and the plan is to auction it off upon completion of the trip (proceeds to benefit the Wounded Warrior Project). Additionally, a fireman's "turn out" coat from Union Fire Co. #1 in Carlisle, Pennsylvania, (where he spent time seeking shelter from Hurricane Irene), is being signed by firefighters met along the way, and Patrick plans to donate the coat to the National Fire Academy in Emmitsburg, Maryland.

The 3,000-mile (4,800 km) walk across the United States is projected to take six months and he is listening to music, audio books, and radio broadcasts of the Red Sox games along the way. He rests in the evenings at Firehouses, VFW Posts and American Legions; he calls ahead of time to the fire stations along the way asking them to attend a presentation and for a place to sleep for the night. While he was home in Rhode Island for a week to attend the Special Olympics, Rhode Island the panel was placed on display at the South Kingstown Elks Lodge. He plans to visit the Arlington National Cemetery in Arlington County, Virginia.

== Memorial panel ==
The memorial panel was sewn together after Patrick researched for a year and a half. He reviewed and confirmed the list of U.S. casualties at militarytimes.com and The Washington Post. Joe "Tiger" Patrick says the purpose of the panel is to give a "close up view to those lost" and "to provide people with the opportunity to see the faces behind the numbers,"

=== Panel details ===
The memorial panel weighs over 50 pounds (23 kg), is rolled up during transport and carried in a 90-pound (41 kg) pack along with the American flag.

The panel measures 25 feet long by 8 feet wide and covers 200 square feet. It is sewn together as a canvas quilt that weighs over 50 pounds. The panel displays over 6600 color images of U.S. service members (men and women), of which 4000 were married, more than half of them were parents, 400 were grandparents, and more than 200 were expectant fathers. One out of every five was under 22 years of age, one in six was a teenager, 27 were single mothers, one was a Vietnam Veteran, and the oldest to die was a Navy Chaplain. The panel is unfolded and displayed every time Patrick stops and is already outdated by additional casualties of war (as of 4 June 2013 47 names were added).

== Causes ==
=== Special Olympics ===
Tiger Patrick has been involved with the Special Olympics for twenty years. He is a coach and coordinator for Special Olympics, Rhode Island. He interrupted his walk for U.S. service members killed in the war to fly back to Rhode Island for a week to attend the state's Special Olympic Summer Games.

Tiger Patrick was announced as the head coach of powerlifting for the 2015 Special Olympics USA Team competing at the World Games in Los Angeles.Team USA page.
