= Cottesloe Beach =

Beach in Perth, Western Australia

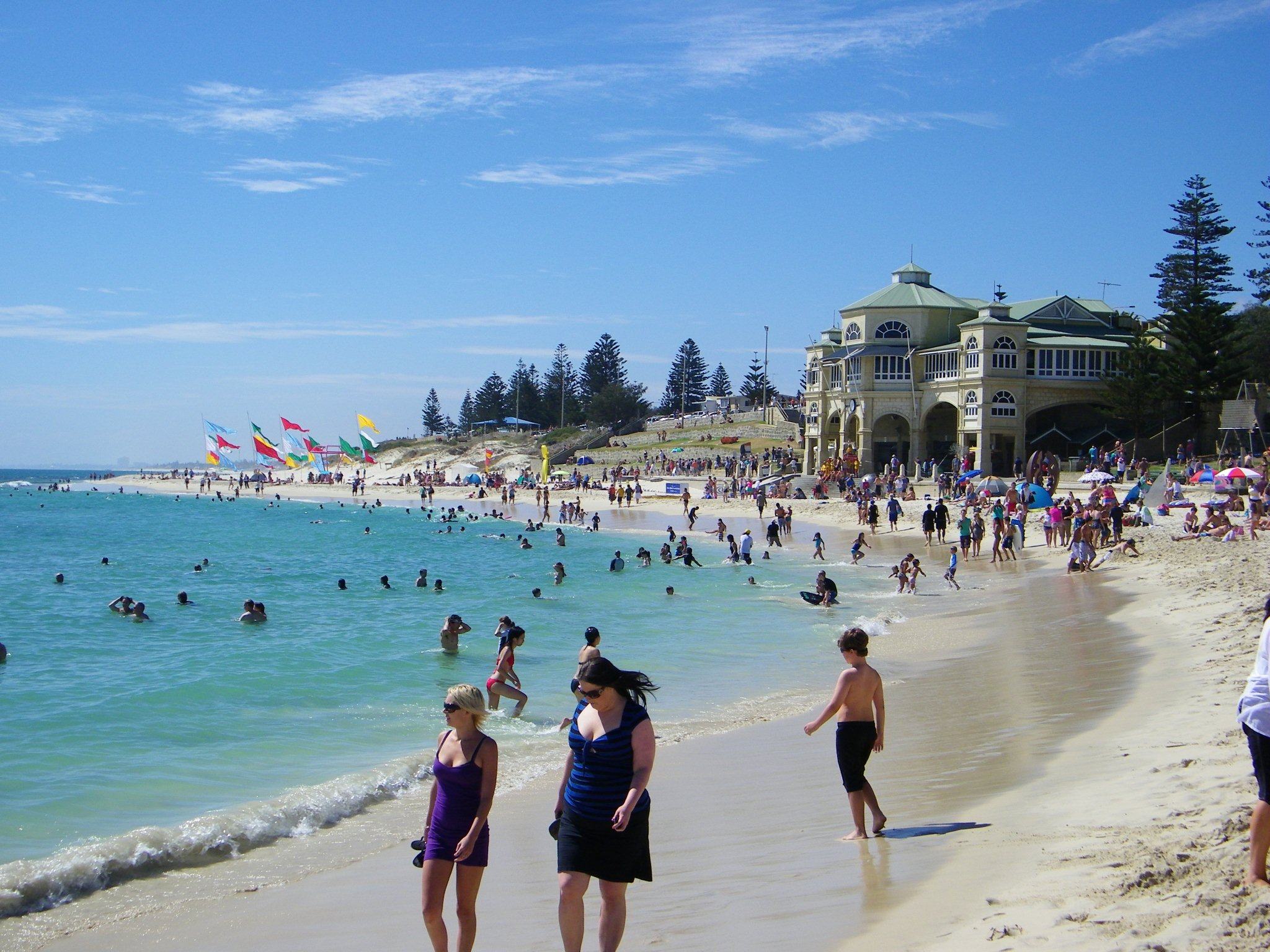
- Cottesloe Beach in 2010 during Sculpture By The Sea

- Location within Perth
- Location: Cottesloe, Western Australia
- Nearest city: Perth, WA, Australia
- Coordinates: 31°59′45″S 115°45′02″E
- Governing body: Town of Cottesloe

Cottesloe Beach, known in the Noongar language as Mudurup, is a popular beach in Cottesloe and one of the most iconic locations of Western Australia. The enduring popularity of the beach is the result of combination of factors including proximity to metropolitan Perth, accessibility by train, shelter from strong summer breezes and presence of offshore reefs making it a relatively safe swimming location. It has been recognised by the Heritage Council as a place of cultural significance since 2005.

Since the beginning of the twentieth century a succession of bathing structures and hotels have been constructed in prominent locations overlooking the beach. The current beach-front structure was constructed in 1996 and is known as the Indiana Tea House. Designed in a neotraditional architectural style it has become an internationally recognised landmark of Perth. The beach hosts the popular Rottnest Channel Swim, and Sculpture by the Sea. It attracts around 600,000 visitors per year.

== Location ==
The beach is located along the coast of the suburb of Cottesloe, Western Australia, and spans 1.5 kilometres (0.93 mi) along the coast, between North Cottesloe Beach to the north and Mosman Park Beach to the south. It lies on the Indian Ocean.

== History ==
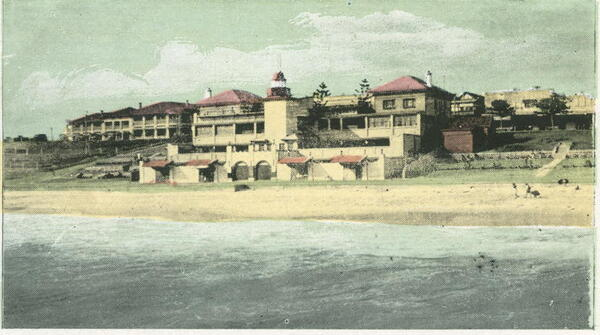
The original Centenary Bathing Pavilion structure before it was demolished in 1982

The beach has been one of the most popular beaches in Western Australia since the 1880s when the suburb of Cottesloe was established. In 1898 the first refreshment stalls and bathing pavilions appeared on the beach. Six years later a jetty was constructed, but destroyed in the storms of the same year. A more steady construction 100 metres (330 ft) in length was constructed four years later and became known as the Cottesloe Pier. The beach has been patrolled and kept by Cottesloe Surf Life Saving Club since the club's official opening in 1909 as part of Surf Life Saving Australia. This was the first lifesaving club in Western Australia.

The Indiana Tea House was a building constructed in 1910 and replaced by the Centenary Pavilion in 1929. When the building became unstable it was demolished and replaced with a small beach pavilion in 1983. The structure was too small and in the mid-1990s the Town of Cottesloe sought expressions of interest for the design of multi-purpose building. The town selected a neotraditional design by architect Lawrence Scanlan that drew influences from the earlier Centenary Pavilion. The building was built over the foundations of the 1983 pavilion and was completed in 1996. Since 2016 Lawrence has been seeking approval for a new Cottesloe Pier structure that will include an underwater observatory, swimming enclosure and pavilions. In 2020, Andrew Forrest purchased the lease for the teahouse and proposed the demolition and redevelopment of the building in a contemporary architectural style.

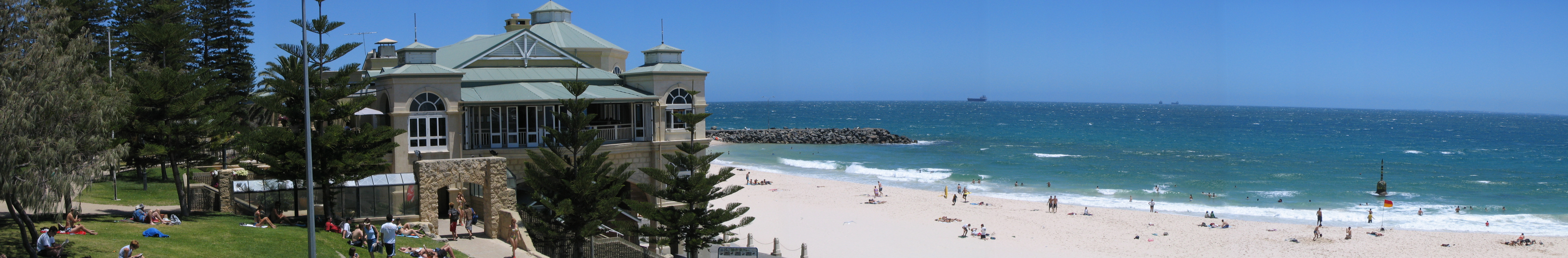
Panorama of Cottesloe Beach and the teahouse

In May 2026, a redevelopment of the foreshore at Cottesloe Beach was announced. However, this redevelopment plans to remove a car park for about 141 cars that the local mayor says needs further funding from the state government to be replaced in a future phase of the redevelopment that the state government has not agreed to and says is not forthcoming.

== The Pylon ==
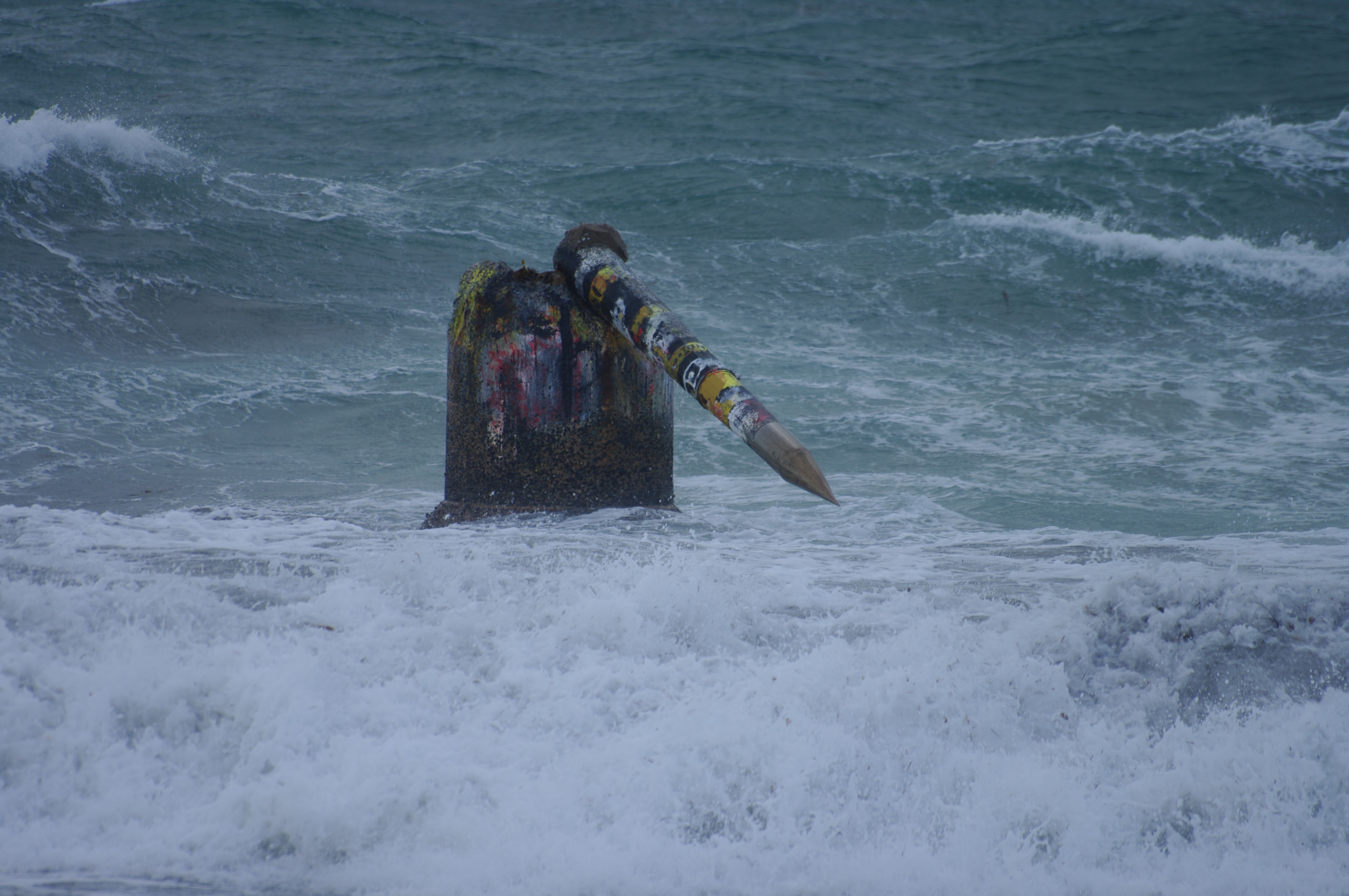
The Pylon after storm damage in May 2009

In December 2008 the town voted to restore the pylon, a concrete structure built in 1935, at a cost of A$172,000, equivalent to A$238,600 in 2022. Decades of battering by the ocean had eroded the pylon, which was one of three pylons built to anchor a shark net following a fatal attack in 1925. Two were destroyed by storms in 1937. Since then it has become an iconic landmark and a popular diving platform for beach users.

During major storm activity on 21–22 May 2009, the spike was knocked off the pylon. However this is not the first time this has occurred; during storms in 1995, the spike was also knocked over. It then remained on the bottom of the ocean in approximately 3 metres (9.8 ft) of water until a group from Swanbourne Nedlands Surf Life Saving Club removed the 800-kilogram (1,764 lb) structure using nothing but wood, rope and surfboards in 1997.

After the pylon was restored, it was painted in the Cottesloe Surf Lifesaving Club colours, but it was soon changed to the colours of North Cottesloe Lifesaving Club. The colours of the pylon change almost yearly with the annual Cottesloe To Swanny Ocean Classic, during which hundreds swim from Cottesloe Beach to Swanbourne. Before the event, members from Swanbourne Nedlands Surf Life Saving Club, North Cottesloe Surf Life Saving Club and Cottesloe Surf Life Saving Club compete to paint the pylon their club colours in order to gain publicity for their club.

== Significant events ==
In 1991, at Cottesloe Beach, 16 solo swimmers and seven teams participated in the first formal Rottnest Channel Swim, with only two solo swimmers failing to finishing. By 1998 the event had become one of the world's largest open-water swimming events with 1150 participants.

In 2005 a companion event to the Sydney-based Sculpture by the Sea was launched on Cottesloe Beach. Although extremely popular (it draws crowds of over 200,000 per year) the event has struggled financially from the outset.
