= World Runners Association =

Sports organization

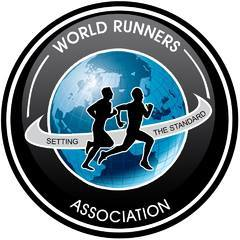
- Formation: October 1, 2014; 12 years ago
- Type: Nonprofit NGO
- Members: 8
- President: Phil Essam
- Website: worldrunnersassociation.org

The World Runners Association (WRA) is a small group of ultra-runners which aims to provide a consistent set of rules for athletes attempting to complete a pedestrian circumnavigation, as well as to ratify and record attempts completed as per these rules. The BBC describes the WRA as "a small-scale operation that functions as a de facto governing body of the extremely niche sport of world running". As of June 2026, the group has eight members all of whom have successfully completed a circumnavigation of the world on foot.

== History ==
The World Runners Association (WRA) was established on October 1, 2014 and is a not-for-profit organization. Jesper Kenn Olsen and Tom Denniss created the World Runners Club, a subsidiary organisation under the umbrella of the World Runners Association.

They set out to offer a common and consistent set of rules, as well as a ratification process based on review of evidence. The BBC describes the WRA as "a small-scale operation that functions as a de facto governing body of the extremely niche sport of world running".

== Members ==
Membership is gained by completing a successful circumnavigation of the world on foot based on WRA's rules or by special invitation. The current president of the WRA is Phil Essam.

| Name | Country | Date Completed | Kms run | Continents crossed |
|---|---|---|---|---|
| Phil Essam (President) | AUS | - | - | n/a |
| Jesper Kenn Olsen | DNK | 2005 (21 years ago) 2012 (14 years ago) | 26,232 | Europe, Australia, North America, South America, Africa, Asia |
| Rosie Swale-Pope | GBR | 2008 (18 years ago) | 32,187 | Europe, Asia, North America |
| Tom Denniss | AUS | 2013 (13 years ago) | 26,232 | North America, South America, Europe, Australia |
| Tony Mangan | IRE | 2014 (12 years ago) | 50,000 | North America, South America, Australia, Asia, Europe |
| Kevin Carr | GBR | 2015 (11 years ago) | 26,232 | Europe, Asia, Australia, North America, South America |
| Serge Girard | FRA | 2017 (9 years ago) | 26,245 | Europe, Australia, North America, South America |
| Marie Leautey | FRA | 2022 (4 years ago) | 28,249 | Europe, Australia, North America, South America |
| Tom Fremantle | GBR | 2023 (3 years ago) | 17,615 | Honorary member (Note: Tom Fremantle, honorary member world-walk affected by Covid-related issues (The Plan, Oxford University Press)) |
| Andrea Prais | CHE | 2026 | 26,670 | |

== Records ==
=== Fastest Circumnavigation of the Earth on Foot ===
| Date | Runner | Duration | Kms run | Record |
|---|---|---|---|---|
Men
| April 8, 2017 (9 years ago) | Serge Girard | 434 days | 26,245 km | 🏆 |
Women
| September 1, 2022 (4 years ago) | Marie Leautey | 825 days | 28,249 km | 🏆 |

=== Longest Circumnavigation of the Earth on Foot ===
| Date | Runner | Duration | Kms run | Record |
|---|---|---|---|---|
Men
| October 26, 2014 (11 years ago) | Tony Mangan | 1,461 days | 50,000 km | 🏆 |

=== Most Circumnavigations of the Earth on Foot ===
| Date | Runner | Circumnavigation count | Record |
|---|---|---|---|
Men
| July 28, 2012 (14 years ago) | Jesper Kenn Olsen | 2 circumnavigations | 🏆 |

=== Youngest to Circumnavigate the Earth on Foot ===
| Date | Runner | Average age | Record |
|---|---|---|---|
Men
| October 23, 2005 (20 years ago) | Jesper Kenn Olsen | 33 years, 147 days | 🏆 |

=== Oldest to Circumnavigate the Earth on Foot ===
| Date | Runner | Average age | Record |
|---|---|---|---|
Men
| April 8, 2017 (9 years ago) | Serge Girard | 62 years 315 days | 🏆 |

== Controversy ==
In 2024 the WRA disputed Russ Cook's claims of being the first person to run the full length of Africa. The disputes center on differing routes and semantics. The WRA agreed Cook is the first to run from Africa's southernmost to northernmost point but claims WRA member Jesper Olsen is the first to run the full length in 2010, running from Taba, Egypt to the Cape of Good Hope in South Africa as part of a world run. According to The Independent Nicholas Bourne, whose 1998 run starting in Cape Town, South Africa and finishing in Cairo, Egypt, was certified by the Guinness World Records in 2000, stated "disputes often arise around ultra-running records because there was no governing body to oversee and set criteria for long-distance challenges". According to Guinness World Records they have no official record for the first man to have run the length of Africa because "there is no recognised standard for the route, distance or time taken".
