= Priestnall School =

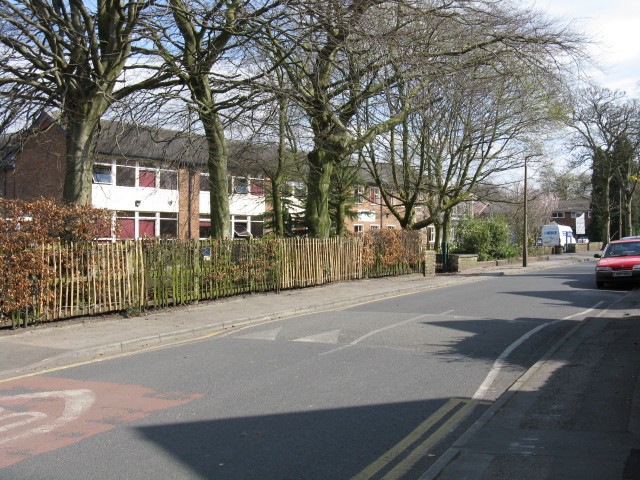

Location
- Priestnall Road; Heaton Mersey; Stockport, Greater Manchester, SK4 3HP; England; 53.41782°N 2.19956°W

Information
- Type: Academy
- Religious affiliation: Mixed
- Established: 1974
- Founder: The Laurus Trust
- Local authority: Stockport
- Trust: The Laurus Trust
- Department for Education URN: 149936 Tables
- Ofsted: Reports
- Head of school: Rachel Howarth
- Executive headteacher: Martin Vevers
- Staff: 200-234
- Gender: Coeducational
- Age: 11 to 16
- Enrolment: 1,272 as of January 2025
- Website: https://www.priestnallschool.org.uk

Priestnall School is a coeducational secondary school in Heaton Mersey, Stockport, England.

== History ==
The school was established in 1974 by a merger of Fylde Lodge High School, which was located in Priestnall Road, Heaton Mersey, and Stockport High School for Girls, which was located in Cale Green. Priestnall School took over the Fylde Lodge High School building. The Stockport High School building was subsequently used first by Davenport High School, then by Hillcrest Grammar School from 1983.

Fylde Lodge High School was built in the 1960s as an all girls school. It was still an all girls school at the time of the merger. Males were allowed to study at Priestnall School from 1987. Priestnall still to this day keeps some heritage of Fylde Lodge.

Previously a community school administered by Stockport Metropolitan Borough Council, in September 2023 Priestnall School converted to academy status. The school is now sponsored by The Laurus Trust. Prior to the Laurus Trust sponsoring the school the school was led by two Acting Headteachers (Mr Timothy Clarey and Mr Robert Jones), this was for the period April 2023 to September 2023.

== Notable former pupils ==
- Liam Broady – tennis player
- Naomi Broady – tennis player
- The Blossom Twins: Lucy Osterfeld (née Knott) and Kelly Sharpe (née Knott) – professional wrestlers formerly contracted with TNA Wrestling and former teaching assistants at St Winifred's Roman Catholic Primary School and Tithe Barn Primary School
- Kate Richardson-Walsh – Olympic gold medalist field hockey player with Great Britain
