= Robert Garside =

First person to run around the world

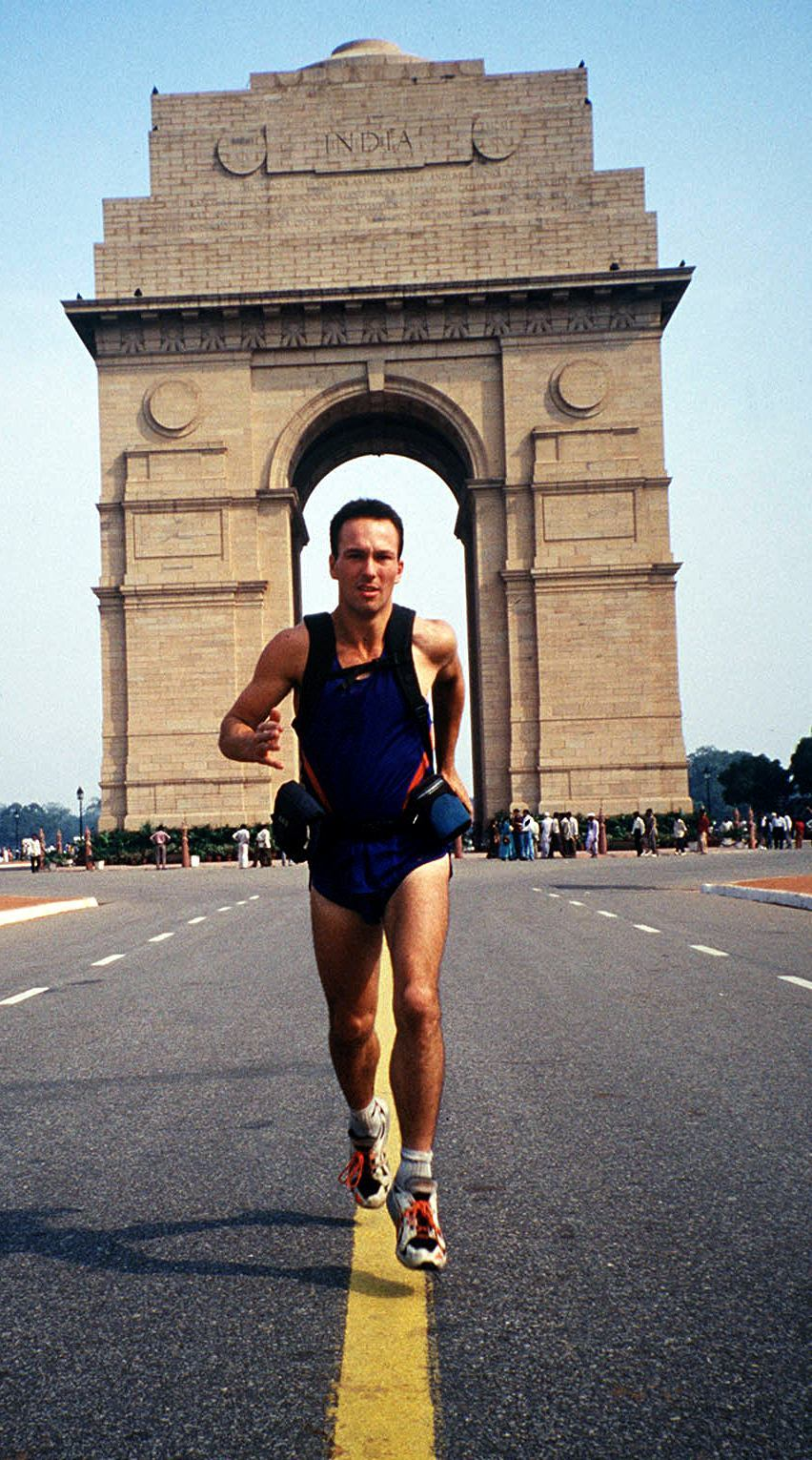
- Garside begins his world-record around-the-world run on 20 October 1997 from India Gate, New Delhi, India.

Personal information
- Nickname: "The Runningman"
- Nationality: British
- Born: 6 January 1967 (age 59) Stockport, United Kingdom
- Website: Deprecated link at archive.today (archived 2014-03-18)

Achievements and titles
- Personal best: world record: first person to run around the world

Robert Garside (born 6 January 1967), calling himself The Runningman, is a British runner who is credited by Guinness World Records as the first person to run around the world. Garside began his record-setting run following two aborted attempts from Cape Town, South Africa and London, England. Garside set off from New Delhi, India on 20 October 1997, completing his run back at the same point on 13 June 2003.

While his run has been challenged by some ultra distance runners and some members of the press, subsequent publications clarified a number of the points raised, such as anomalies in his online diary, and his running of the Nullarbor plain without a support crew – a feat believed impossible according to classic ultrarunning methodologies but achieved using lateral thinking and relying upon passing traffic and local people to drop off water for him instead – and highlighted the clashes of personality, running approach, and actions, that had engendered the concerns.

In assessing his feat, Trailrunner senior editor Monique Cole stated he had clearly run more of the world than anyone else, while former media critic Dan Koeppel, who became one of the few journalists outside Guinness to discuss and examine his full records at length, became convinced by 2005 that Garside had indeed run around the world and expressed great remorse and "haunting" guilt at his past part in fuelling a media frenzy that, as he felt, "screwed one of the greatest runners ever" and "erased... one of the most incredible things a runner had ever done".

Guinness World Records, who spent several years evaluating evidence, declared it authentic and the record was officially bestowed on Garside on 27 March 2007 at a ceremony in Piccadilly Circus, London, England.

== Background ==
Born in Stockport, Cheshire, England, Robert Garside attended Hillcrest Grammar School, where he was an all-round sportsman and captain of the soccer team, and after school, switched between several academic courses and jobs (including the Merchant Navy and police). Garside had become obsessed with running in the late 1980s, and while studying psychology at London's Royal Holloway University he described how he came across a copy of Guinness World Records in January 1995, and noticed that there was a record listed for walking the world, but not for running it. He decided to attempt to set a record as the first person to run around the world, an extreme ultramarathon feat.

He credited as part of his motive, his mother's happiness at leaving his father to return to her native country, Slovakia, following their divorce, when he was a teenager, and also finding that the state of mind he reached when running as an adult brought back some of his "best times" from childhood, where he ran and played in the "huge forests" near his house.

"[Garside] says he developed a need to travel almost as a way to follow his own mother who – in exiting a difficult relationship [...] – had finally found a sense of contentment. 'I remember the day she left... she was so happy leaving all that stuff behind'. The joy and freedom of that escape, Garside says, is what gave birth to his own wanderlust. '[I wanted to see] the world, because it's a way of understanding things..."

Garside stated that his aim was to run for his own satisfaction as well as the record, therefore he set about running each continent the longest way possible, rather than the easiest way to gain the record. His run covered around 40,000 miles across 6 continents and 29 countries. Koeppel notes that attempting to run Africa was entirely voluntary, and that the renowned first walk around the world, by David Kunst 30 years earlier covered barely a third of that distance (14,452 miles) and skipped South America and Africa. In a 1998 video interview Garside added that he was motivated because it was "so challenging", clarifying that he meant it was challenging to himself.

It's not something you want to rush. You want to go the long way. You want to see stuff. This is the world...

— Robert Garside

== World run ==
=== Initial attempts ===
Garside's first effort from Cape Town, South Africa, in early 1996 was abandoned in Namibia, and his second attempt, begun on 7 December 1996, started from London's Piccadilly Circus but was abandoned at the Russia-Kazakhstan border around June 1997; Garside initially covered up the break in running with fabricated diary entries (see below), for which he later apologised saying that he had not wanted potential competitors to know of the lapsed progress. He recommenced his run some weeks later, from New Delhi, India.

It was therefore his third attempt, initiated on 20 October 1997 from the monument of India Gate in New Delhi, that was eventually authenticated by Guinness as a successful record.

=== 1997 – 2003 world run ===
During his run, Garside updated his website with a portable computer, describing an arduous journey complicated by human and natural hurdles that included physical attacks and imprisonment as well as grueling climate extremes. He met with considerable assistance, as he was offered lodgings around the globe in such diverse settings as five-star hotels and private homes to prison cells and police stations. In addition to corporate sponsorship of £50,000, he indicated he received £120,000 in donations from individuals. One donor in Hong Kong agreed to back Garside in return for a share in future profits. Along the way, Garside also met his future wife, then Endrina Perez, in Venezuela.

Garside indicated in 2001 that it was his habit to jog seven to eight hours a day, covering an average of forty miles a day when running on flat ground, outfitted with a video camera to record his journey and a fifteen-pound backpack. On his third run, he used his video camera every 20 minutes while running to take a four-minute clip of his location, and routinely requested signed, dated documents from local officials.

Garside completed his world-traversing journey on 13 June 2003 at the monument of India Gate, at which time The Independent reported the total miles run over five and a half years at 35,000 (approximately 56,000 kilometers), covering territory in 30 countries. Near the end of his run, Garside indicated that the worst experiences he'd encountered were three days spent running without any food and five days spent in jail in China because he lacked proper documentation. He described running over the Himalayas as "fantastic" in spite of freezing temperatures, "the most spiritual of mind journeys."

==== Route and timings ====
Route details in this section are taken from Koeppel's summary of Garside's run, published 2012

Date(s)	Location	Subsequent travel/notes
20 October 1997	Departs New Delhi, India	Runs across Tibet and East across China
May 1998	Shanghai, China	Flies to Cape Noshappu, northern tip of Japan, then runs north–south length of Japan
August 1998	Osaka, Japan	Flies to Perth, Western tip of Australia, then runs the South coast of Australia to Sydney on the East coast
September–October 1998	Nullarbor plain, Australia	
March 1999	Sydney, Australia	Flies to Punta Arenas, Southern tip of Chile, then commences a zig-zag run to North America
December 1999	Rio de Janeiro, Brazil	
January 2000	Marabá, Brazil	
May 2000	Caracas, Venezuela	Attempts to continue through Colombia but forced by safety concerns related to another kidnapped and murdered long distance sportsperson and political unrest related to guerilla conflicts to turn back to Venezuela and fly to the next country, Panama; then resumes running north through Central America to Mexico
August 2000	Acapulco, Mexico	Flies north-west across Gulf of California to the Mexican state of Baja California Sur, then runs north to the Mexico-USA border This flight, while in the rules, was one of those seized on by critics.
September 2000	Mexico–United States border	Continues running north up the Pacific coast
October 2000	San Francisco, United States	Begins running eastward across the width of the United States
March 2001	New York City, United States	Flies to Cape Town, close to the southern tip of Africa and begins running north through Africa
December 2001	Mozambique-Malawi border	The 9/11 attacks in New York City cause the border to be closed when Garside reaches it, forcing a change of plans for Africa. Instead of running the continent, Garside notifies Guinness, and flies to Rabat Morocco, leaving the rest of Africa for a later stage. (In the event he has only limited success in his desire to run the full length of Africa; his world run does not cover the entire length of Africa. Of note, the rules do not require him to do so, nor have other recognised pedestrian circumnavigators always done it. He does traverse Africa laterally to a limited extent, although not at its maximum width, by running from Cape Town on the Atlantic coast to Mozambique on the Indian Ocean coast)
February 2002	Rabat, Morocco	Runs north along the coast to the Straits of Gibraltar, then crossing the straits by ferry, enters Gibraltar and Spain. Continues running parallel to the South East coast of Spain into mainland Europe
June 2002	Valencia, Spain	Continues running along Southern Europe via the length of Italy, crossing to Greece and then again to inland Turkey, finally reaching Antalya Turkey. Ferries taken at places, notably the Adriatic Sea (Southern Italy-Greece), and Aegean Sea (Greece-Turkey)
Around Autumn 2002	Antalya, Turkey	Flies to Northern Egypt to re-attempt Africa.
?	Egypt and Eritrea (Masawa Eritrea: Feb 2003)	Two attempts failed at running Africa: one along the length of the Nile in Egypt, the other retracing back to north Egypt and going via Saudi Arabia and flight to Eritrea, and then south along the coast. Both failed. Garside abandons his hope of running the north–south length of Africa, although this isn't strictly required for the record. Instead he flies to, and runs part of, Mozambique, the country where he was forced to abandon his prior attempt at running Africa in December 2001.
April 2003	Beira, Mozambique	Flies to Kanyakumari, at the southern tip of India, then runs inland up the centre (or slightly west of central) India.
13 June 2003	Arrives New Delhi, India	Run ends

==== Equipment, funding, and approach ====
Garside's equipment and funding was described by Koeppel and also in an August 2000 article, when he was in Central America. Koeppel states that Garside ran with around 15 pounds (6.8 kg) of equipment in a backpack, and started with around £20 ($30) of money; the latter report broadly reports similarly. His possessions were a palmtop computer, digital video camera, map, toothbrush, change of clothing, and a hat – the article comments that to reduce weight he did not keep a water bottle, instead finding water sources as he ran, including at times natural sources such as rivers and puddles. Other reports add to these, a cellphone, a music player or music playing phone, a camera, and passport visas and paperwork.

He had also learned, Garside stated, to raise sponsorship as he ran; the August 2000 article states he had raised around $90,000 by selling interviews and his story to media as he travelled, by the time of the interview.

There had also been running companions and girlfriends on the journey, as well as support and help from the public: "[P]eople always help you out" Garside commented.

==== Running ====
Regarding the physical toll of ultra-distance running, Garside stated that his choice of approach was key, although commenting it took him two years to recover afterwards:

"[It's] just like going for a jog every day and not going back home."

"Well, you've got to be in good condition, but when athletes injure themselves it's because they're pushing themselves to win something, trying to squeeze that little extra out of their bodies. I don't have that kind of pressure. I'm allowed to take a rest between stages to let my body recover. Your body tells you when it needs a rest."

He also commented on the experience of running itself:

"It's difficult to describe, but you get into the rhythm, and your focus is heightened. It becomes really, really clear, [...] That's why I've always run alone, for my own pleasure. Running with other people, my attention is divided. I can't get into that altered state. I don't understand the desire to train for three years just to run a 2-1/2-hour marathon with a lot of other people."

A number of people who casually ran alongside Garside for a time, or testified to his running, were also quoted in various media, for example:

- In SF Weekly (Nov 2000) – "The first time we met Robert [...] he had just run from Half Moon Bay to the Ferry Building in San Francisco [distance: approx. 30 miles]. He pulled out his computer and made an entry. Had two cell phones going at once. Then he was running toward the Golden Gate Bridge at a pace that would have challenged a 200-yard sprinter while talking on the phone. The person on the other end would have never been able to tell."

- South American Guardian correspondent Alex Bellos was quoted by New York Press as confirming that he had "witnessed Garside running through Brazil, and watched him documenting it with signed statements by roadside acquaintances".

- Veteran marathon runner, trainer, organizer, and director Jay Wind reported that he had encountered Garside in Virginia and run with him; the news report stated: "just watching Garside–who at times outpaced Wind, I observed–gave evidence the critics are wrong".

- A Californian microbrewery owner reported how, in 2000, he accompanied Garside covering 60 miles in a day (20 miles running, 40 miles by car) at an average pace of 8.5 minutes per mile (11.2 km/h, 7 mph), followed the next day by a 30-mile run over the steep San Marcos Pass at a similar pace, and that Garside had also been accompanied in California by a group of a dozen employees using a support car, who between them had jogged or driven with him for a week. He commented, "He was the real deal. I can't be any more positive. He just ticks differently than other people." The brewery owner commented that "the primary highlights were the multiple ambushes he (Garside) experienced on the way" from runners who effectively stalked and harassed him, and demanded he run with them, or at their preferred pace.

=== Online diary entry controversies ===
The record breaking run was originally commenced in 1996 at London's Piccadilly Circus (although this is now generally considered his second attempt). According to Garside, at the Russia-Kazakhstan border he received a plea from a former girlfriend to be with her during a family medical emergency involving her mother. Returning to London, he resumed his run in October 1997 from what he deemed his new starting point, in New Delhi, India. In 2001 faced with questions about his records, he admitted that some diary entries from around June 1997, prior to his restart in New Delhi, describing colorful adventures in Kazakhstan, Uzbekistan, Tajikistan, Pakistan and Afghanistan had been fabricated to hide his diversion home from competitors. He stated of the matter that the break it covered was intended to be brief and within rules: "It's a tactic ... I suppose it's a lie. I'm sorry about that". He had also previously explained the matter as abandonment due to the 1992–1996 civil war in Afghanistan.

Other controversies highlighted on his verified run mainly related to flights omitted from his online diary – one of which made Garside appear to have run at world record speeds in Mexico – and being found in locations which contradicted his online information. Garside commented on these that he had not always updated his online diary promptly, and at times had made repeated or unplanned brief air trips which were not reflected in the online record.

One such incident was his meeting with Ronnie Biggs, a famous British criminal, on the coast of Rio de Janeiro, when according to his diary he was supposed to be in the Amazon rainforest. Garside quipped that he had decided to go and see Biggs because "he's on the run – and so am I!" and that his 3-month visa had expired by Manaus, requiring back-and-forth flights to several cities to rectify the problem before resuming, which had not been documented online. The New York Press reported that the Guardian's Brazilian correspondent Alex Bellos had confirmed the visa expiry as being genuine. Other incidents, such as the flight in Mexico, did not damage his record attempt as they were allowed by Guinness' criteria, but were seized on by an already skeptical audience. Garside – often running thousands of miles away or in isolated places, poorly disposed towards much of the broader running community, solitary, secretive about adverse events affecting his progress, and at times abrasive in his responses – was often poorly placed to handle these appropriately, and at times responded with invective or numerous phone calls instead.

=== Evaluations and opinions by other runners and popular media ===
Even before Garside completed his third run, some ultra distance runners and press media had questioned his achievement, in particular because he seemed to be an individual without recognized prior ultrarunning experience and who had lacked the usual help, and some of his claims seemed too remarkable to be plausible. Some of these were addressed in dialog between Garside and Dan Koeppel, a former critic, after the completion of the run.

A 2002 article in Sports Illustrated described media and the running community's concerns in depth, saying that "[His] 'little white lies' have led to bigger and grayer ones (he has been forced to retract [other claims]), so that now nobody knows what, if anything, he says is true", and characterised him as a "self-mythologizer"; a former ally was quoted in the same article as opining that Garside was being "destroyed" before he had finished the run, by his "readiness to deceive". The article's author considered this to have created a problem that, as of 2002, while "no one dispute[d]" Garside had run a great distance, equally nobody could be certain how many of those miles he claimed to run but had not. Garside himself said only that the records and evidence he was sending home periodically would bear out his side of the dispute in the end. According to Andy Milroy, an ultramarathon claim authenticator of 25 years experience, this was an especially severe concern in a world run, as "one bit of jungle, one bit of shrub, one bit of road looks like any other", for a runner lacking a support team or stipulated route, the usual means of validation.

One major critic of Garside was David Blaikie, editor of now-defunct Canadian website Ultramarathon World and former president of the Association of Canadian Ultramarathoners, who according to Koeppel "wielded huge influence" and as a critic became Garside's "primary nemesis". He expressed disbelief stating "I do not believe ... that he has fully run any of the major sections of the world he has claimed, or even a substantial portion of any section." Blaikie also cited the lack of any support team or helpers to help him carry food and water and his lack of experience with ultramarathons as reasons to doubt Garside's claims. Steven Seaton, then editor of Runner's World, also pointed out Garside's lack of previous experience with ultramarathons, saying, "Some of the things he has claimed to have achieved would constitute world records for ultrarunning, which is nonsense for somebody who is claiming to have run almost every day. He went into this with no outstanding ultra-credentials, which makes it difficult to believe what he claims to have done." A demonstration for Richard and Judy on Channel 4 in the UK, for which Garside agreed to rerun the 130 miles he stated he had run in 24 hours (a routine distance for an ultrarunner), observed by witnesses including Ian Champion of the London to Brighton Run and UK Road Runners Club, resulted in Garside pulling out after 72 miles. As well as hiding his 1997 restart, Garside had also apparently admitted to shortening his route by 1300 km by taking an airplane from Mexico City to the United States border; his diary left the impression of 10 days to run 1300 km, a world record if true. Jesse Dale Riley of the Trans-American Footrace expressed concern that Garside's records showed him crossing 746 miles of the Nullarbor Plain without a support crew, stating that "I know a lot of people who have crossed the Nullarbor but I've never heard of anyone doing it alone. The issue of water supply alone casts serious doubt. It's totally inconceivable to me how anyone could do such a thing and survive".

[F]rom an armchair it is completely impossible to run the Nullarbor. Once you're out there, however, there is a way. Robert Garside discovered it. So would I.

— Dan Koeppel: Redemption of the Runningman

Koeppel, investigating the latter, traced the discrepancy to a matter of running philosophy: Garside, who ran for pleasure and took a far longer route than he needed to, had not approached his run as a competitive athlete would, and had used strategies that formal athletic approaches would not have conceived. Where Blaikie, Riley and other ultrarunners saw the Nullarbor as unrunnable without support, Garside explained to Koeppel that the Nullarbor was "no tougher than anywhere else", because he obtained support from "passing traffic" who would leave water cached ahead for him at agreed drop-offs, or give him transport to sleep elsewhere after a day's running and take him back to resume running the next day from the same place he had stopped. He commented in his diary that "the key to running the Nullarbor turned out to be Australian hospitality", a statement confirmed by Koeppel in 2010 when he succeeded in vindicating Garside's strategy by running its 200-mile driest zone himself the same way, and contacted others who saw Garside run it.

Koeppel also found that contrary to prior claims, Garside indeed had a prior record as a runner and in particular as a sub-3-hour marathon runner, including three well-known marathons where he had "done well" in 1994 with times of 3.01 (London Marathon), 2.48 (Brussels Marathon) and 3.10 (Amsterdam Marathon) respectively; Garside's comment on his televised demonstration (ended at 72 miles of 130) was that mentally and emotionally, "running in circles" round a track – which he had not done before – had not been at all like long-distance cross-country running, and was "demoraliz[ing]"; Ian Champion softened his opinion on the matter as a result, commenting that it could indeed have been "situational".

The New York Press commented on the controversies upon Garside's 2001 arrival in New York. They stated that Guinness did not require running where roads did not exist, or unreasonable feats, but noted that his undisclosed use of air flight at times – notably in parts of Central and South America – led to "the British press... ripping into him". Lengthy and vitriolic animosity between Garside and Canadian ultrarunner and reporter David Blaikie, who had become a "huge critic", was also noted, as were statements by third party runners and businesses who paced Garside and supported his claims. The article quotes Trailrunner senior editor Monique Cole:

"Garside’s problems are really political: several respected distance runners were told to sod off when they offered to join him on legs of his journey. He has so alienated the U.S. running community that even if Guinness grants him the record, 'A lot of people are going to say, so what?' And yet Cole admires Garside. 'It’s obvious he has run a huge amount of the world, more than anyone else has'."

Garside's former manager or patron, photo agent Mike Soulsby, agreed with the assessment, stating to Dan Koeppel that he had no financial interest in Garside, who owed him money. Looking back, he provided what Koeppel felt might be "the definitive statement" on Garside, apart from Garside's own:

"I think Robert was sometimes his own worst enemy.... I think he was talking himself up as a way to motivate himself and sometimes it went too far."
Q: And the run?
"The answer is yes. [...] Robert Garside ran around the world. He did it."

Upon announcement of authentication in 2007, there was a measure of concern that the feat should be scrutinized carefully or seemed dubious. The Guardian quoted Ian Champion of the UK Road Runners Club, who had been called upon to judge Garside's uncompleted supervised 24-hour road test in April 2004, as saying he was "stunned" at the decision, with the paper noting his non-completion of the 130-mile 24-hour run in near-ideal conditions under observation. Reuters described the award as "a major vindication for Garside".

==== Dan Koeppel's apologia: Redemption of the Runningman ====
In August 2012's Runner's World, journalist and runner Dan Koeppel published a lengthy apologia over his role in helping discredit Garside's world run, for which he felt great remorse. Titled Redemption of the Runningman and subsequently anthologized in The Best American Sports Writing 2013, it tells the story of how, not long after the run, Koeppel had come to regret the attacks upon Garside as a "media lynch mob" that he himself had helped to ignite, and the erasure of "one of the most incredible things a runner had ever done", his changed belief that "Garside did run the Nullarbor", and that he wanted to "make amends" to Garside for the "haunting" sense of guilt he felt for having "screwed one of the greatest runners ever".

"Garside [...] returned to his starting point unharmed—but via an angry incredulity that led him to be seen not as a trailblazer but as a fraud. I was here (i.e., the Nullarbor) because I'd doubted Garside, and in my journalistic expression of that had helped instigate a media lynch mob that contributed to the destruction of his reputation. And of all the places Garside ran, those who didn't find him credible argued, the Nullarbor—the impossible, wasted, torrid Nullarbor—was where some of Garside's biggest lies played out. But Robert Garside did run the Nullarbor. At least that's what I'd come to believe after an encounter with the runner in London a year after he finished his journey. And I realized that in the attacks I'd joined, one of the most incredible things a runner had ever done—run around the world—was wiped out. Almost eight years on foot erased because I and other journalists had been too willing to believe somebody else's definition of what a real runner is, and decided that Robert Garside couldn't possibly be one. So now, I want to make amends. I want to prove that running this place is possible. And when I do, I hope the remorse that has haunted me for almost a decade will burn away."

In his article, Koeppel recounted how he had favoured Blaikie's style, as a reputed and smooth-mannered reporter and runner who "seemed credible", to Garside's abrasive style, and had not paused to consider both sides fairly, thereby making "a classic journalistic error" when Blaikie "built a perfect journalistic campaign against Garside". Eventually he stated, "When I got the chance to see the evidence, he'd clearly been to all the places he claimed to have been – and he'd moved at a runner's pace". Later, meeting Garside in London, he was given full access to copy the runner's logs, photographs and records as well as confirming Garside's past running record (including three "well run" and well-known marathons from 1994 timed between 2:48 and 3:10), and contacted people worldwide who confirmed following Garside for many tens of miles at a time, and in places "arguably more inhospitable than the Nullarbor". Finding that Guinness, having accepted the record as genuine in 2007, had "rested" it (removed it from their public records), Koeppel began attempting to reverse the decision, and, when Garside became uncontactable in 2010, he decided to go further and challenge Blaikie's premise that the Nullarbor was unrunnable, by successfully running 200 miles across the heart of the Nullarbor – its "loneliest, driest, emptiest" zone – himself using Garside's strategy, and relying on support from passing drivers rather than a formal crew.

=== World record criterion ===
Guinness' criterion for a recognized world record required Garside to run the equivalent distance of around the world, covering both North and South hemispheres and all but the Arctic and Antarctic continents:

"For the purposes of this record, the journey involves starting and finishing at the same place. The total distance travelled must exceed the length of the Tropic of Capricorn, namely 36,787.559 km [22 858.73 miles]. The Equator must be crossed at least once. All lines of longitude must be crossed. And all continents (Europe, Asia, South America, North America, and Australia) have to be covered within the route."

(Note that there is some conflict of sources or error of calculation involved in either the distances and continents Guinness states to be required, or in their past records, since Guinness World Records also report that the first verified walk around the globe totaled far less than this minimum, at only 14,452 miles, and omitted South America.)

According to 2009's Getting into Guinness, Guinness permits rest days and ship or plane travel across bodies of water in epic journeys, and according to Canada's The Globe and Mail an average speed of no less than 10 km/h (6.25 mph) is required when running, to avoid being classified as 'walking'.

=== Authentication by Guinness World records ===
Guinness World Records began considering evidence of Garside's record, evaluating the journey that began in New Delhi on 20 October 1997, after his detour to spend time in the UK with his girlfriend, including China, Japan, Australia, South America, North America, Africa, southern Europe, and the Middle East. In 2007, Guinness authenticated and recognized Garside's run, formally listing him as the first person to run around the world, declaring they were quite satisfied with the evidence evaluated, and that their conclusion was that:

"Robert Garside... started and finished at India Gate, New Delhi, India, taking a total of 2,062 days, from 20 October 1997 to 13 June 2003, to run through 29 countries on six continents. Although Robert’s record attempt finished in 2003, it has taken 5 years to collate and confirm the record evidence [...] We are very cautious to accept records like this because they are difficult to certify, however Robert has provided us with full evidence which enabled us to authenticate his amazing achievement. We initially evaluated 15 boxes full of credit card statements, receipts in Robert’s name and other useful evidence, which supported Robert’s presence in all of the 29 countries within the time specified. We then moved on to establish whether Robert had actually been running and started to look through an astronomical number of pictures and newspaper cuttings from different parts of Robert’s route. We also reviewed over 300 time-coded tapes featuring Robert running at different locations during his journey. We could finally double check the route followed through statements from several witnesses, and passports stamps and visas. [...] We rarely accept new records for "first" achievements as most of the records we publish are breakable. In this case, however, we felt Robert’s run was extraordinary and deserved to be mentioned as a Guinness World Record".

The record was officially observed on 27 March 2007 at a ceremony in Piccadilly Circus, where representatives of Guinness endorsed the record. Garside said, "I'm really happy about this, this run cost me everything."

== Subsequent activities ==
In 2003, Garside indicated his intention to follow up his record-setting run by running across the Antarctic and swimming around the globe, with intentions to embark on the latter in June 2004. Garside married his girlfriend in London in 2004, having met her in Venezuela in 2000.

== See also ==
- Long-distance running
- List of pedestrian circumnavigators
- List of circumnavigations
