= Paul Salopek =

American journalist and writer (born 1962)

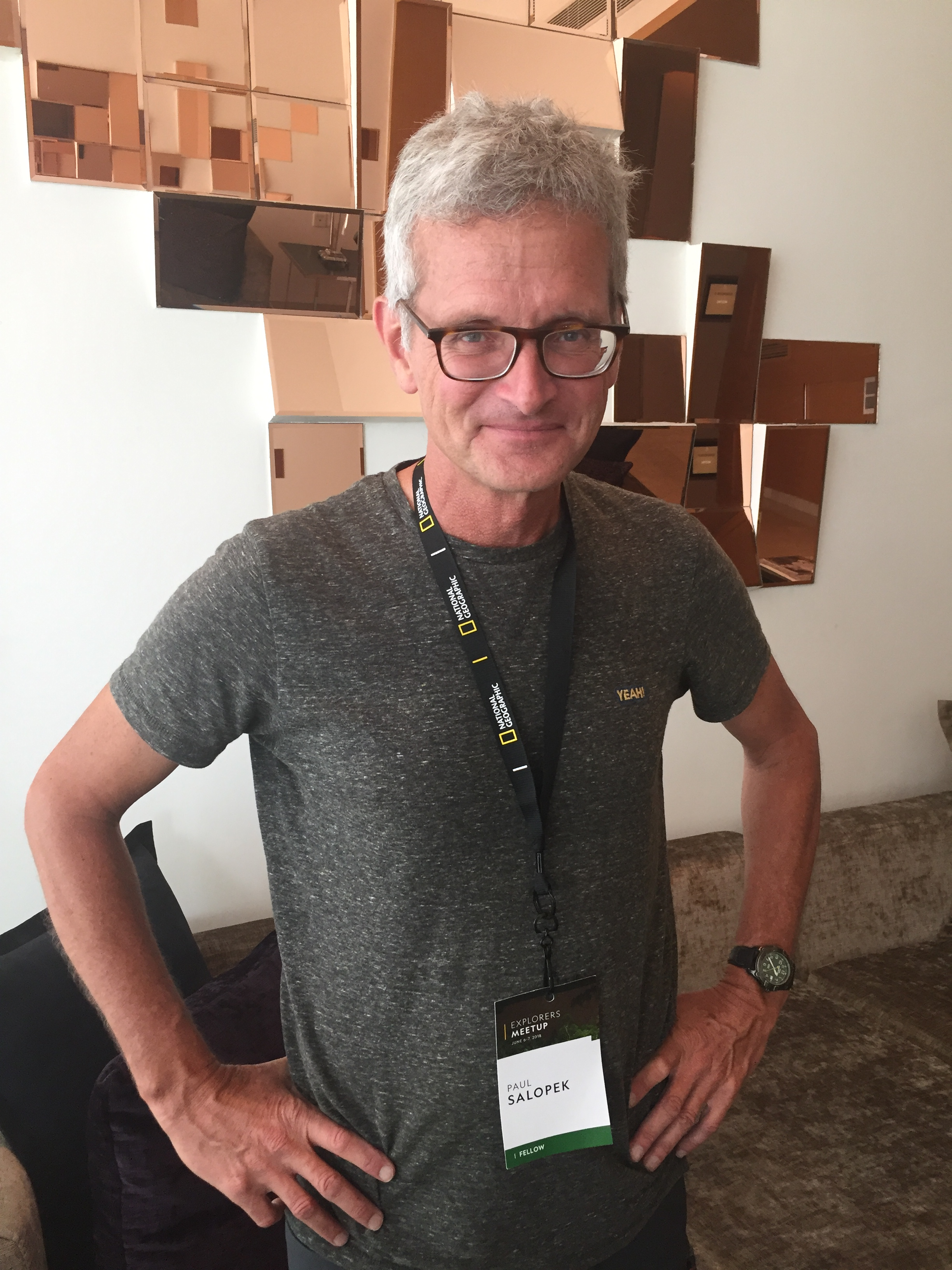
- Salopek in 2018
- Born: February 9, 1962 (age 64); Barstow, California, U.S.
- Education: University of California, Santa Barbara
- Occupations: Journalist; writer
- Years active: 1985–present
- Known for: Out of Eden Walk
- Spouse: Linda Lynch

Paul Salopek (born February 9, 1962) is an American journalist and writer raised in central Mexico. He is a two-time Pulitzer Prize winner. He has reported globally for the Chicago Tribune, Foreign Policy, The Atlantic, National Geographic magazine, and many other publications.

In January 2013, Salopek founded the IRS-classified nonprofit organization Out of Eden Walk, originally projected to be a seven-year walk along one of the routes taken by early humans to migrate out of Africa. As of December 2025, the project is ongoing. The transcontinental walking journey plans to cover 24,000 miles. In addition to public donations, Out of Eden Walk is partially funded by the National Geographic Society, the John S. and James L. Knight Foundation, the Robert R. McCormick Foundation, and the Abundance Foundation.

== Early life and education ==
Salopek was born in Barstow, California. His father moved the family to Mexico when he was six, disillusioned with life in the United States after the assassinations of John F. Kennedy and Martin Luther King Jr.

Salopek received a degree in environmental biology from the University of California, Santa Barbara, in 1984. He has worked intermittently as a commercial fisherman, shrimp-fishing out of Carnarvon, Australia, and most recently with the scallop fleet out of New Bedford, Massachusetts, in 1991.

== Career ==
Salopek's career in journalism began in 1985, when his motorcycle broke in Roswell, New Mexico, and he took a police-reporting job at the local newspaper to earn repair money.

Salopek reported for the Chicago Tribune from 1996 until 2009, writing about Africa, the Balkans, Central Asia, and the wars in Afghanistan and Iraq. He worked for National Geographic magazine from 1992 to 1995, visiting Chad, Sudan, Senegal, Niger, Mali, and Nigeria. The October 1995 cover story for National Geographic was Salopek's piece on Africa's mountain gorillas. He reported on U.S.–Mexico border issues for the El Paso Times. In 1990, he was Gannett News Service's bureau chief in Mexico City.

In 1998, he won the Pulitzer Prize for Explanatory Reporting for two articles profiling the Human Genome Diversity Project. In 2001, he won the Pulitzer Prize for International Reporting for work covering Africa. Columbia University President George Rupp presented Salopek with the prize, "for his reporting on the political strife and disease epidemics ravaging Africa, witnessed firsthand as he traveled, sometimes by canoe, through rebel-controlled regions of the Congo".

Salopek was a general-assignment reporter on the Chicago Tribune's metropolitan staff, reporting on immigration, the environment, and urban affairs. He spent several years as the Tribune's bureau chief in Johannesburg, South Africa. While on freelance assignment for National Geographic in Darfur, Sudan, he was ambushed and imprisoned for more than a month in 2006 by pro-government military forces.

== Out of Eden Walk ==
In January 2013, as a National Geographic Fellow, Salopek embarked on a walk along one of the routes taken by early humans to migrate out of Africa, initially scheduled to last seven years. The transcontinental foot journey is meant to cover 24,000 miles, beginning in Ethiopia, across the Middle East, and through Asia, via Alaska, and down the western edge of the Americas, to the southern tip of Chile. The project, entitled Out of Eden Walk, is an independent IRS-classified 501(c)(3) nonprofit charitable organization. Media and funding partners include the nonprofit's primary sponsor, National Geographic Society, as well as the John S. and James L. Knight Foundation, the Robert R. McCormick Foundation, and the Abundance Foundation. As a nonprofit, the Out of Eden Walk project relies on public support and donations to survive.

Salopek has walked with hundreds of local people along the route thus far, including writer and photographer Arati Kumar-Rao in India. In October 2021, after a 20-month hiatus in Myanmar due to the COVID-19 pandemic, Salopek reached China, before continuing on his walk. By September 2025, he had crossed China, South Korea, and Japan, and in October, he arrived at Prince Rupert, British Columbia, having travelled from Yokohama by container ship. From there, he will embark on a three-year walk from Alaska to Tierra del Fuego, the final point of earliest human migrations in the Western Hemisphere.

== Personal life ==
Salopek is married to Linda Lynch.

== See also ==
- Karl Bushby, adventurer who traveled from Tierra del Fuego to England on foot
- Tim Cope
- List of pedestrian circumnavigators
