= Tony Mangan =

Tony Mangan may refer to:

- Tony Mangan (runner)
- Tony Mangan (golfer)
