= Jesper Olsen (runner) =

Danish ultra distance runner

Personal information
- Full name: Jesper Kenn Olsen
- Nationality: Danish
- Born: 2 July 1971 (age 55) Copenhagen, Denmark
- Height: 1.79 m (5 ft 10 in)
- Weight: 70 kg (150 lb)
- Website: worldrun.org

Sport
- Country: Denmark
- Sport: Running

Achievements and titles
- Personal bests: 10 km: 31:29 ½ Marathon: 1:08:10; Marathon: 2:27:57 100 km: 6:58:31; 100 mi: 15:26:09; 6 days: 780 km Longest distance: 26,232 km (2005); Longest run: 662 days (2005)

Jesper Olsen, or Jesper Kenn Olsen, is a multiple national record holder ultra distance runner from Denmark, and was the second person verified to have run around the world (16,000 miles: 2004-2005), as well as the first verified to have run around the world in a north-south rather than east-west direction (25,000 miles: 2008-2010, 2011-2012, due to 6-month illness and injury).

== Background ==
Olsen has a master's degree in political science from Copenhagen University, Denmark. He also has a law degree.

== Running ==
Olsen has been a marathon runner since the age of 15. He has achieved various milestones, including the European elite on 100 km and 24-hours; the national recordholder on 100 km, 24-hours and 6-days (6:58, 224 km, 549 km), the national elite on marathon (2:27), as well as the Cliff Young Australian 6-day race in November 2004, running 756 kilometres, and the South African 6-day race in April 2008 with a total of 685 kilometres.

Following positive reception of his proposal of a world run in 2001, Olsen also founded the World Run project as the organization to undertake the attempt and its support.

== World runs ==
=== World Run I ===
The concept of Olsen's world run originated as a suggestion made in 2001 by Olsen to David Blaikie, who published it with an invitation for comments on his website ultramarathonworld.com. Olsen suggested that, without taking sides in then-current controversies in the ultra-running world, a professionally organized world run would be a "constructive" and "truly sportsman[like]" response to widespread ultrarunner community skepticism and discussion concerning Robert Garside's world run, which had been in progress since 1997 but was viewed with great skepticism by Blaikie and many ultra-runners and had not yet been authenticated by Guinness at the time. In his letter, Olsen stated that while he was "fairly new to the 'real' ultra-running" world, he did hold the Danish national record for the 100 km run (6:58:31) and for the 24-hour run (223 km), had been running marathons since around 1986 (15 years), and having finished a degree, was able to commit the time required if the proposal gained the necessary support from others.

Olsen's run around the world took 22 months. It started on 1 January 2004 and finished on 23 October 2005. His route consisted of: London-Copenhagen-Moscow-Vladivostok-(air)-Niigata-Tokyo-(air)-Sydney-Perth-(air)-Los Angeles-Vancouver-New York-(air)-Shannon-Dublin-(air)-Liverpool-London. Olsen averaged 28 miles (45 km) a day, slightly more than a marathon. It totalled just over 16,000 miles (26,000 km), exceeding the distance of the first verified walk around the world (Dave Kunst, 1970-1974, 14,452 miles (23,123 km)) but around (or slightly under) half the distance of the first verified run around the world, when Garside's run was eventually verified by Guinness in 2007 (Robert Garside, 1997-2003, estimated 30,000 - 40,000 miles (48,000 - 64,000 km)) During most of the run, Olsen pushed a baby carriage, in which he kept food, beverages, a tent, and other equipment. While running through Russia and half of the U.S., he was aided by a support car transporting these supplies. From London to central Siberia he was accompanied by Alexander Korotkov of Russia, who planned to run around the world with Olsen but gave up in central Siberia.

In October 2006, Jorden Rundt i Løb ("World Run" in English) was published.

=== World Run II ===
Olsen and Sarah Barnett ran the North-South route starting on 1 July 2008. The North-South run aimed to complete a distance of 40,000 kilometres (25,000 mi) with GPS tracking and live coverage, thus making it the world's longest fully GPS-documented run. The run went from top to bottom of the globe and back, running across four continents and a huge range of temperatures and terrain. It can be seen as a run in a circle around the world in southern, later northern direction with the poles excluded. It started at North Cape, Norway (1 July 2008) passing Helsinki, Finland (4 August), Copenhagen, Denmark (25 August), Budapest, Hungary (25 September), and Istanbul, Turkey (5 November). On December 1, 2008, near Silifke, Turkey, Barnett had to give up after 7,334 kilometres (4,557 mi), and Olsen continued alone. He passed Cairo, Egypt (1 January 2009) and Addis Abeba, Ethiopia (16 April). Cape Town in South Africa was reached by 15 March 2010, thereby completing the first half of the run and the first documented run through Africa, a distance of 21,449 kilometres (13,328 mi).

Olsen spent more than six months recovering in Denmark due to dysenteria, malaria, and two operations to eliminate deep infections in his right arm. He then continued his run on 1 January 2011 from Punta Arenas for the last half of the run, through South America and North America to Newfoundland . On 28 July 2012, Olsen announced on his website the completion of World Run 2 in Cape Spear, Newfoundland. Russ Cook completed in 2024 a run which covered the full length of Africa. According to the World Running Association, that feat was instead accomplished by their member Jesper Olsen in 2010, when he covered the distance from Taba in Egypt to the Cape of Good Hope in South Africa in 234 days.

== Personal bests ==
- 10 km - 31:29 min
- ½ marathon - 1:08:10 h
- Marathon - 2:27:57 h
- 100 km - 6:58:31 h
- 100 miles - 15:26:09 h
- 6-days - 780 km
- Longest run: 26,232 km /1 lap (Earth) - 662 days

== Bibliography ==
- The Runner's Guide to the Planet e-book, 2014 ASIN ASINB00PAK1I2Y
- Kunsten at ville (The Art of Wanting) (in Danish) e-book, 2022 ASIN B0BHDXW33X
- Jorden rundt i løb: 26.232 km, 2 år, 4 kontinenter (Running Around the World: 26,232 km, 2 years, 4 continents) (in Danish) e-book, 2022 ASIN B0BHDW4S2Y

== See also ==
- List of pedestrian circumnavigators
