= Out of Eden Walk =

Journalism project by Paul Salopek

- Type of project: Journalism project
- Founder: Paul Salopek
- Key contributors: National Geographic Society; Pulitzer Center
- Launched: January 2013; 13 years ago
- Status: Active
- Website: outofedenwalk.org

The Out of Eden Walk is a long-form journalism project led by American journalist Paul Salopek, who began walking in 2013 along a route approximating the early human migration out of Africa. The project is managed by an independent nonprofit organization and supported by the National Geographic Society. The combines travel writing, photography, audio, video, and mapping to document contemporary life along the journey.

== Background ==
The project was created by Paul Salopek as an experiment in "slow journalism", which would use walking as a method for reporting on different communities and landscapes at human scale, while following one of the broad migration routes associated Out of Africa theory. The project was originally planned as a seven-year trek from Africa's Rift Valley to Tierra del Fuego, but due to delays and other factors has continued beyond its initial schedule.

A recurring feature of the project is the "milestone" in which a standardized record made at regular intervals along the route. These milestones include observations of landscape, sound, people, and other details from the walk. The project publishes written dispatches, photographs, audio recordings, videos, and map-based stories through the National Geographic Society's Out of Eden Walk platform.

== Route ==
The walk began at Herto Bouri, Ethiopia, in the Afar region near the Great Rift Valley. The first chapter, "Out of Africa", covered Ethiopia, Djibouti, and a Red Sea crossing between January and May 2013. The project has organized the route into chapters including "Out of Africa", "Holy Lands", "Autumn Wars", "Silk Road", "Riverlands", "Middle Kingdom", "Asian Rim", "Ocean Crossing", and "Americas".

In a 2019 essay for The New Yorker, Salopek wrote that the route was intended to follow archaeological and genetic evidence for ancient human migration as closely as modern borders, wars, and practical conditions allowed. By that time, he had walked from Ethiopia through regions including Saudi Arabia, the Levant, Afghanistan, and India, and planned to continue across China and toward Alaska before proceeding down the Americas.

The walk was disrupted by the COVID-19 pandemic, with Salopek having paused in Myanmar. He resumed the route in China in October 2021 after a quarantine in Shanghai. In April 2023, while Salopek was in China, PBS NewsHour described him as halfway through the journey.

By January 2025, Salopek reached the Pacific Rim, and wrote that he hoped to board a cargo ship from Japan to Alaska that spring. In May 2025, he was in Nagano Prefecture. He crossed the North Pacific by container ship in 2025, with a November 2025 dispatch describing the crossing as the project's "Ocean Crossing" chapter.

In October 2025, National Geographic announced that the project had entered North America, beginning a new phase of the journey in Alaska. In January 2026, Salopek published a dispatch from Anchorage, Alaska. In October 2026, he arrived in Victoria, BC. At that point, he was 5,000 days into his trip and had walked approximately 30,000 kilometres.

== Educational use and organization ==
The Out of Eden Walk has been used as an educational resource by National Geographic Education and the Pulitzer Center. National Geographic Education describes the project as a resource for subjects including anthropology, genetics, geography, human geography, social studies, storytelling, and geographic information systems. The Pulitzer Center, an education partner of the project, has promoted the walk as a tool for teaching about migration and global storytelling.

The Out of Eden Walk is also associated with an independent nonprofit organization, Out of Eden Walk, which describes itself as a 501(c)(3) organization supporting Salopek's journey and related educational work.
