= Russ Cook =

English endurance athlete (born 1997)

Russell Cook
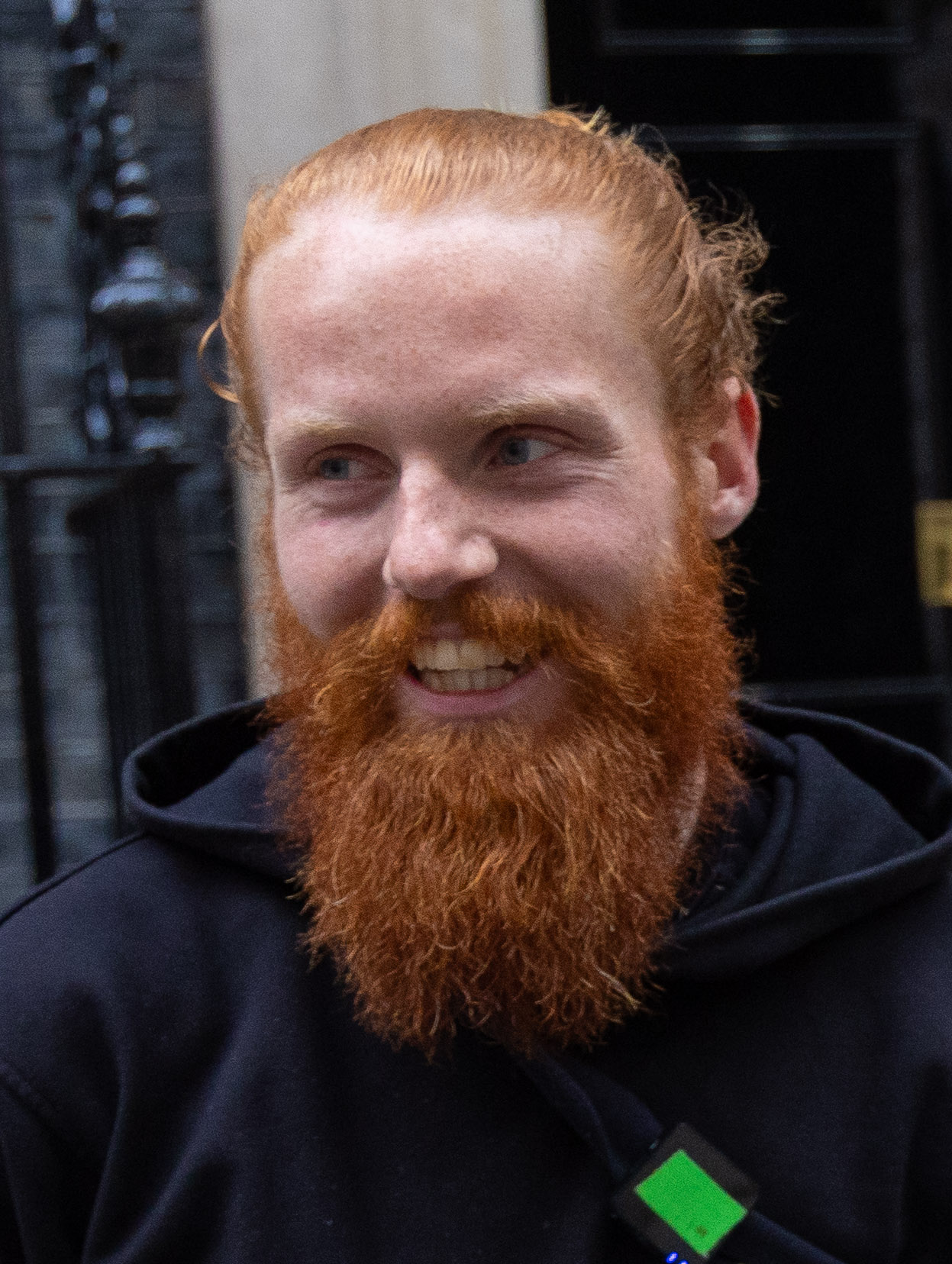
- Cook in 2024

Personal information
- Nickname: Hardest Geezer
- Nationality: English
- Born: 13 March 1997 (age 28) Worthing, England

Sport
- Sport: Ultrarunning
- Updated on 7 April 2024

Russell Cook (born 13 March 1997), also known as Hardest Geezer, is an English endurance athlete from Worthing, West Sussex. In April 2024, Cook became the first person to run the entire length of Africa from the southernmost to the northernmost point of the continent as part of Project Africa.

== Early life and education ==
Cook was born in Worthing, West Sussex, attended Vale school in Findon before attending Worthing High School and Worthing College.

== Career ==
In 2019, Cook ran from Istanbul, Turkey, to Worthing, England, in 68 days with no support team. The course covered approximately 2,900 km (1,800 miles). In 2020, he set the world record for the fastest marathon run whilst pulling a car, in 9 hours, 56 minutes.

In 2021, Cook was buried alive for 7 days with just 20 litres of water and a ventilation tube. The event was livestreamed.

=== UEFA Euro 2024 ===
During the UEFA Euro 2024 football tournament Cook ran to every England game. Starting on 11 June, Cook ran from Wembley Stadium in north west London, to Gelsenkirchen, Germany, taking the ferry from Harwich to Hoek van Holland. Cook then ran to Frankfurt and Cologne before returning to Gelsenkirchen. England progressed through the quarter and semi-finals, taking Cook to Dusseldorf, Dortmund and Berlin for the final.

The project was sponsored by Sports Direct and Score Draw, a clothing brand.

=== 247 Mission: Iceland ===
In August 2025, Cook was one of a group of seven who ran a combined 377 miles (607km) along the northern coastline of Iceland in two days, led by George Heaton and alongside ultra-endurance runners William Goodge and Hercules Nicolaou, with British international runner Alfie Manthorpe, and Jake Dearden and Lucy Davis.

== Running the length of Africa ==
Start and finish points of Project Africa

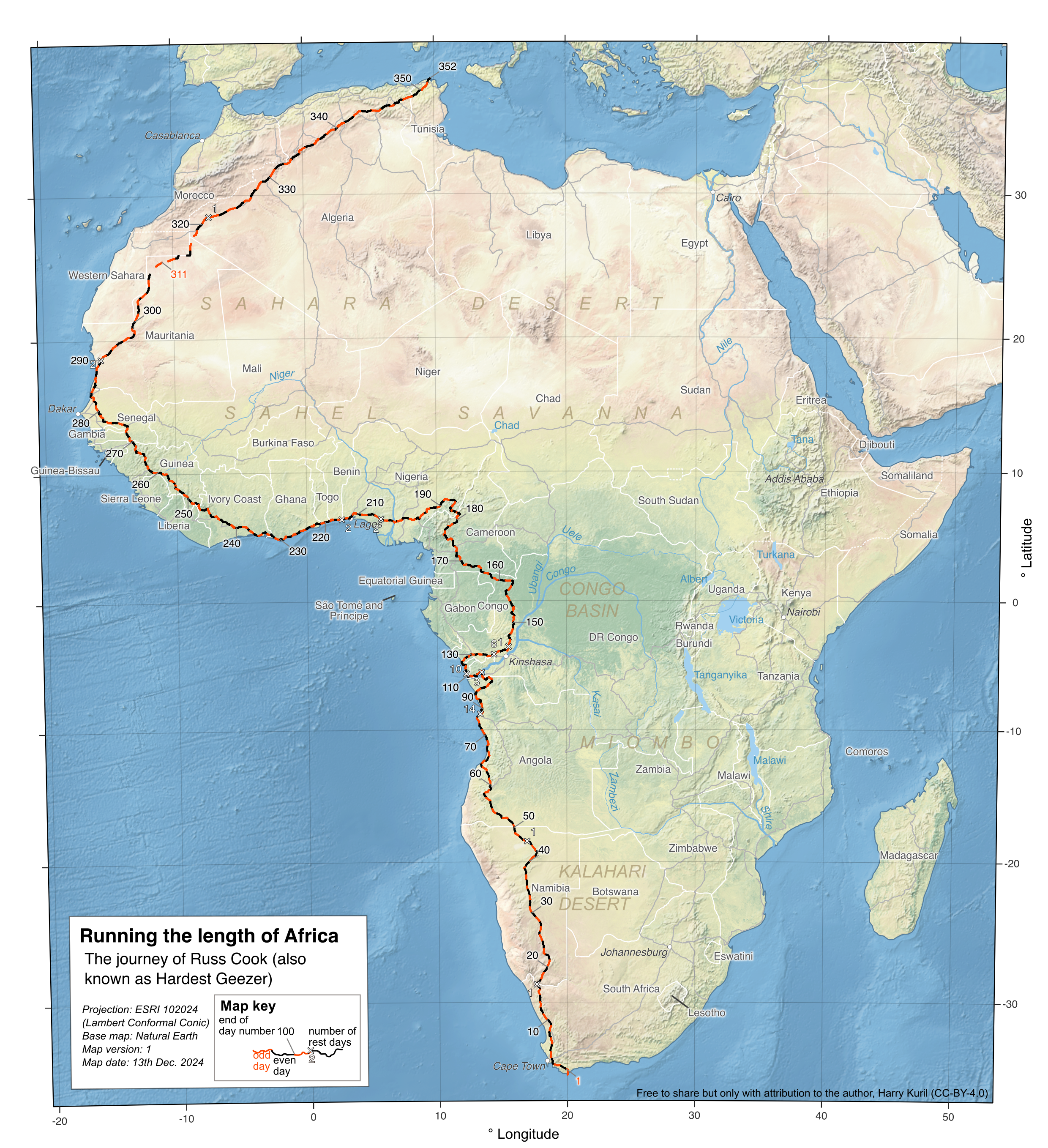
Map of Cook’s running route across Africa, showing his daily progress.

On 22 April 2023, Cook began Project Africa, planning to run the entire length of the African continent. He began in Cape Agulhas, South Africa, the southernmost point, and ended in Cape Angela, Tunisia, the northernmost point on 7 April 2024. The course covered 16,000 km (9,900 mi) and crossed 16 countries. During the run, he had to overcome several challenges including being robbed at gunpoint, food poisoning and being accosted by men with machetes. Starting from Cape Agulhas, South Africa, in April 2023, it took Cook 352 days and approximately 10,190 miles (16,400 km) to reach the most northerly point of Africa in Bizerte, Tunisia, on 7 April 2024. Although initially planning to complete the feat in 240 days, complications with visas, injury, armed robbery, and kidnapping led to the attempt taking over three months longer. As of August 2024, Cook is the only known person ever to have run the entire length of Africa from the continent's southernmost to northernmost point.

The project was fundraising for two charities, The Running Charity and Sandblast, and exceeded its £1,000,000 goal on 24 April 2024. As part of his endeavour he raised money for the Running Charity, who offer running and mental health programmes to people who are struggling, as well as the charity Sandblast who support the indigenous Saharawi population of Western Sahara. Cook took on the challenge because he had faced mental health issues, gambling addiction, and struggles with alcoholism.

Two weeks after completing Project Africa, Cook was invited to run with British prime minister Rishi Sunak around Westminster, London.

=== Route ===
Starting from Cape Agulhas, South Africa, Cook traveled approximately 10190 miles (16,400 km) through 16 countries along the western coast of Africa to reach the most northerly point in Bizerte, Tunisia.

The full list of countries Cook traversed (in order of first entry) is as follows:

1. South Africa
2. Namibia
3. Angola
4. Democratic Republic of the Congo (DRC)
5. Republic of the Congo
6. Cameroon
7. Nigeria
8. Benin
9. Togo
10. Ghana
11. Ivory Coast
12. Guinea
13. Senegal
14. Mauritania
15. Algeria
16. Tunisia

The route included an extended stint through an extremely rural section of the Saharan desert in Mauritania along unpaved roads. During this segment Cook was forced to run at night to avoid the excessive heat of the desert. He was also subjected to several sandstorms and a snowstorm in Algeria.

Cook had originally planned to run from Tunisia to South Africa, however, due to Algerian visa issues he was forced to invert the route and travel from south to north.

=== Support crew ===
Whilst Cook was alone for much of the running, he was supported by a crew throughout the project, meeting with them at least twice a day for breaks as well as to sleep.

Besides logistics support the crew’s primary function was to produce content for Cook’s social media channels and a biweekly YouTube series documenting the project. The crew also plan to produce a future documentary of the project. Due to this requirement, many of the crew members were photographers and filmmakers. The initial crew consisted of:

- Stanley Gaskell, a British filmmaker
- Jarred Karp, a South African filmmaker
- Harry Gallimore, a British photographer

Later in the project the crew varied with new members being added and others leaving. Other crew members include:

- Guus van Veen, a Dutch ex-paratrooper who cycled across Africa prior to joining the crew
- Jamie Carson, a German film editor and content producer
- James Ward

The crew initially lived and traveled in a modified van, nicknamed “Nelly”, but later acquired a 4×4 vehicle to traverse more challenging roads.

=== Challenges ===
==== Funding ====
A lack of funding was a substantial issue from the conception of the project with it taking several years to collect initial funds from sponsors and investors. Despite this length of time, Cook started the run with limited funding. Due to this, Cook and his crew were reliant on income from sponsorship and social media to complete the project.

==== Armed robbery ====
On 24 June 2023, 64 days into the attempt, Cook and his support crew were robbed at gunpoint in Angola of cameras, money, and passports containing visas for many of the remaining countries.

Following the incident, in which nobody was hurt, the team received a police escort for the remainder of their time in Angola.

==== Health issues ====
During the attempt Cook suffered from multiple bouts of food poisoning as well as catching the flu.

The first bout of food poisoning occurred less than 30 days into the attempt which he ran through. Two weeks later, he began to urinate blood and protein for no clear cause, forcing him to reduce his mileage for two days until it was confirmed the issue was not serious.

Cook also suffered from several injuries during the attempt. By around day 200, Cook experienced severe back pain, forcing him to take a two-day rest period during which he received treatment in a hospital in Nigeria.

==== Visa complications ====
Visa complications were a regular issue, especially after the loss of passports and visas in the robbery. These issues forced Cook to pause the attempt for an extended period whilst visiting various embassies where he attempted to obtain new visas.

The Algeria–Mauritania border presented particular difficulties. Cook originally planned to run from north to south, however, due to a lack of an Algerian visa, he reversed the route at the last minute. Despite this, by day 278 Cook’s team had still been unable to obtain an Algerian visa. However following a post to his online following on social media which garnered large amounts of traction, he was granted a courtesy visa by the Algerian embassy in London five days later.

==== Kidnapping ====
On day 102 of the run Cook was separated from his support crew in rural DRC. During this time he entered a small rural settlement where he was apprehended by men armed with machetes who demanded payment. He was later taken to another village seven hours farther into the jungle where he was held in a hut for several days until his team was able to reach him and pay off his captors. Following this, Cook modified his route and traveled through Cabinda rather than continuing through the DRC. Cook later described this experience as the “scariest moment” of the project and stated that “Probably for about one minute (I) thought about quitting, and then I realized I couldn't, so that was about as close as it got”.

==== Logistics and vehicle issues ====
Logistical issues were a regular challenge for Cook and his support crew, particularly about the transport and functionality of their support van. Breakdowns were a regular occurrence from the onset of the project with the van’s brakes requiring repairs as early as day 5.

Transport of the vehicle also presented issues including having to arrange to fly the vehicle to South Africa as well as shipping it via boat from the Republic of Congo to Cameroon due to a lack of passable roads. Due to these issues the crew also purchased a second 4×4 support vehicle.

=== Controversy ===
After completing the challenge, the claim that Cook was the first to run the full length of Africa was disputed by the World Runners Association (WRA) and Nicholas Bourne. The disputes centered on differing routes and semantics. The WRA agreed that Cook was the first to run from Africa's southernmost to northernmost point but claimed that WRA member Jesper Olsen was the first to run the full length in 2010, when he ran from Taba, Egypt, to the Cape of Good Hope in South Africa as part of a world run, while Nicholas Bourne's 1998 run, starting in Cape Town, South Africa and finishing in Cairo, Egypt, was certified by the Guinness World Records in 2000. According to The Independent, "Mr Bourne said disputes often arise around ultra-running records because there was no governing body to oversee and set criteria for long-distance challenges". According to Guinness World Records, they have no official record for the first man to have run the length of Africa because "there is no recognized standard for the route, distance or time taken".
