= Karl Bushby =

English wayfarer (born 1969)

- Bushby in Hull in November 2026
- Born: 30 March 1969 (age 57); Hull, England
- Occupations: Paratrooper (formerly), wayfarer
- Known for: Completing a journey from Chile to England on foot
- Military career
- Allegiance: United Kingdom
- Branch: British Army
- Service years: 1985–1996
- Rank: Corporal
- Unit: Parachute Regiment
- Conflicts: The Troubles
- Website: karlbushby.world

Karl Bushby (born 30 March 1969) is an English wayfarer and former paratrooper. He is best known for walking around the world over a 28-year period from 1998 to 2026.

Born and raised in Hull, he began the Goliath Expedition in November 1998 from Punta Arenas, Chile, with the intention of walking an unbroken path back to his home town in England without any form of motorised transport. Various delays extended the trip's intended duration of 12 years to 28 years, though only 15 of the years were spent walking. Bushby took multiple breaks throughout this time, with visits to the US and Mexico, though he had a policy to continue walking from the last point he stopped at. He reached England in October 2026 and concluded his trip in November 2026.

His journey spans 28 years and 1 day (from November 1, 1998 to November 2, 2026). It covers 31 countries across 4 continents (South and North America, Asia and Europe).

== Early and personal life ==
Bushby was born on 30 March 1969, in Hull, Yorkshire, England. He was raised in the Sutton Park area of Hull. He was bullied at school for having partial dyslexia, diagnosed at 13 years old, later describing the experience as "hell", and finding solace in the outdoors through birdwatching near his home. Bushby attended a local comprehensive school and joined the British Army at the age of 16. Bushby served with the 3rd Battalion Parachute Regiment for 11 years. He originally intended to continue serving as a soldier for the first three years of his expedition, using his signing bonus to fund his expedition, and he initially received the Army's approval to do so. The Army cancelled this offer at the last minute, forcing Bushby to raise money for the journey himself.

While serving as a soldier in Operation Banner in Northern Ireland in the early 1990s, Bushby met and married a woman from Belfast named Angela. They had one child, Adam, before divorcing in 1995. Since beginning the Goliath Expedition, Bushby has rarely seen his son, although Adam joined him briefly for part of his protest walk across the United States in 2014. When Bushby arrived home in 2026, he met his 12-year-old granddaughter for the first time.

Bushby met his next partner, Catalina Estrada, while travelling in Medellín, Colombia, in 2000. He faced difficulties bringing Estrada with him on the later parts of his journey, particularly while travelling through Canada in 2003. By 2011, Bushby and Estrada had broken up; Bushby later said that "you can't have a relationship on the road."

== Goliath Expedition ==
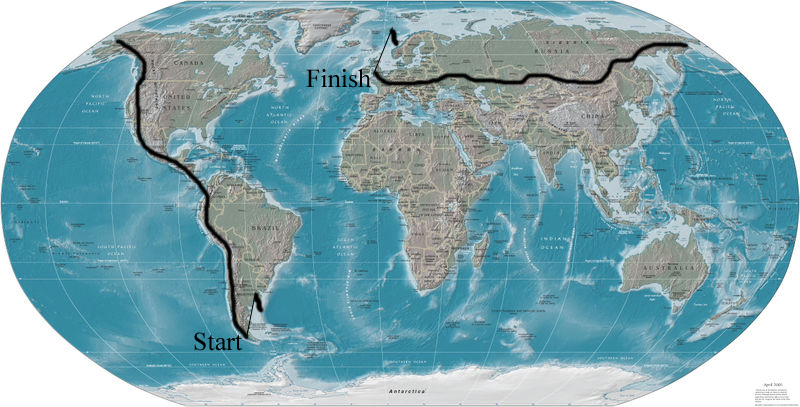
The planned route for the expedition

Bushby's handcart, 'The Beast', at its final destination in November 2026

The Goliath Expedition was Bushby's attempt to walk around the world "with unbroken footsteps", from the southern tip of South America to his home in Hull, England. While in the army, Bushby was prompted to set out on the expedition after receiving a birthday card from his father mentioning an argument between special forces troops about the possibility of walking from London to New York over the Bering land bridge. After sketching a route for such a journey on a world map, Bushby decided to extend the length of the journey by starting in South America. Bushby's resolve to carry out the journey was strengthened when fellow soldiers whom he told about his plans responded that it was impossible. He left Hull on 5 October 1998 and originally expected to finish the trek of 36,000-mile (58,000 km) in 12 years. Numerous delays made the expedition last approximately 28 years.

=== South and Central America ===
On 1 November 1998, Bushby set off from Punta Arenas, Chile. His route through South America took him through Argentina, Peru, Ecuador and Colombia. Entering Central America required Bushby to cross the inhospitable Darién Gap. Many locals expected him to be killed or abducted by the paramilitary Revolutionary Armed Forces of Colombia (FARC), which viewed all foreigners as potentially part of the US-backed Plan Colombia initiative. Bushby successfully evaded FARC guerillas and entered Panama in February 2001, although he spent 18 days in a jail in Metetí for entering the country without a visa.

=== North America ===
On 29 April 2002 Bushby left Mexico and entered the United States at Nogales, Arizona. Upon reaching Las Vegas in July, Bushby was told that his 90-day visa had expired and could not be renewed while he was in the United States. He thus flew back to Bogotá to apply for a six-month visa, returning to Las Vegas to resume the walk when his visa was approved in August.

On New Year's Day 2003, a day away from crossing into Canada, Bushby's handcart was stolen while he was visiting a bar in Toole County, Montana. He spent the next month replacing the items that were lost, only for the stolen handcart to be found in a quarry just before he was ready to depart the United States.

=== Russia ===
By 2006, he had completed over 17,000 miles (27,000 km). Bushby intended to set out from Fairbanks, Alaska, and cross the frozen Bering Strait during the winter of 2005 but made it only as far as Unalakleet before spring began and his U.S. visa expired once again. Between 17 and 31 March 2006, Bushby and French adventurer Dimitri Kieffer successfully crossed the Bering Strait on foot, having to take a roundabout 14-day route across a frozen 150-mile (240 km) section to cross the 58-mile (93 km) wide strait from Alaska to Siberia. They were detained by Russian border troop officers while they were crossing the Russian border near the Chukotkan village of Uelen, for not entering Russia at a correct port of entry. They were threatened with being banned from Russia, which would stop the journey. It was announced on 5 May 2006 that the Russian appeal court had upheld Bushby's application and his walk would continue. This was reported to be the result of consultation between John Prescott, deputy prime minister of the United Kingdom, and MP for Bushby's home town of Hull, and Roman Abramovich, governor of Chukotka.

From late 2008 to 2010, Bushby spent his time in Mexico for cost reasons and was unable to travel to Russia. This was both because of difficulty getting a visa and permits, and because of financial trouble; Bushby lost several of his sponsors due to the 2008 financial crisis. After Bushby secured new sponsors in 2010, the Russian government issued him another visa, and he resumed walking across Russia in the spring of 2011.

In addition to the 90-day time restraint imposed by Russian visas, Bushby was hampered by the tundra conditions. Because his route took him through an area that can only be travelled on foot via frozen rivers and ice roads, he could only walk during the late winter and early spring. On 25 April 2011, after walking approximately 680 miles (1,100 km), Bushby reached the town of Srednekolymsk, completing his leg for 2011. Beginning his 2012 leg, he only needed to travel an additional 560 miles (900 km) before reaching improved roads, meaning his travel would only be limited by the Russian visa rules. On 12 April 2012, Bushby reported on his site that the Russian authorities had denied him a visa for 2012.

In March 2013, Russia banned Bushby from re-entering Russia for five years, citing a border violation from the previous year. Bushby protested in 2013 by walking over 3,000 miles (4,800 km) in the US from Los Angeles to Washington, D.C.; his destination was the Russian Embassy. Bushby's visa ban was later overturned.

=== Central Asia ===
Bushby crossed the Mongolia–Russia border in 2017, and on 8 August 2017 he was in Ulaanbaatar, Mongolia. After entering China in 2018, Bushby travelled through the Xinjiang region. His progress was temporarily restricted by local authorities, and following intervention by the British Embassy he was allowed to continue under restrictions and police escort. He subsequently entered Kazakhstan and continued his journey westward. Bushby crossed into Uzbekistan early in June 2019, reaching the border between Turkmenistan and Iran a few months later, where the journey was on pause due to visa issues and the COVID-19 pandemic.

In August 2024, Bushby started the swim across the Caspian Sea from Kazakhstan, planning to finish in Azerbaijan to avoid going through Iran or Russia, as both countries were then too dangerous to enter with a British passport. Bushby was accompanied by co-swimmer Angela Maxwell and two Azerbaijani national swimmers, Anastasia Boborykina and Abdurrahman Rustamov. Each day, Bushby and company swam in two 3-hour sessions: one in the morning, one in the afternoon and resting and sleeping on support boats each night. The swim covering 179 miles (288 km) was achieved in 31 days with 132 swimming hours. From Azerbaijan, Bushby then went to Turkey in 2025 to cross the Bosphorus Strait into Europe.

=== Europe ===
Bushby with his family in Kingston upon Hull on his return in November 2026

In September 2025, Bushby finished crossing Turkey and entered Bulgaria, entering the Schengen Area. In October 2025, he had entered Romania and was 1,375 miles (2,213 km) from the United Kingdom. On 15 November 2025, he arrived in Budapest, Hungary, and planned to head to Vienna, Austria. In December 2025, he was reported to be in Slovakia. Due to Schengen visa restrictions limiting his stay to 90 days within a 180-day period, he was required to leave the Schengen Area. By January 2026, he was temporarily in Mexico while waiting for his visa allowance. Two months later, he returned to Hungary before continuing his journey toward the United Kingdom.

In early June 2026, he had reached Belgium, and in mid-June returned to Mexico due to visa expiry before applying for access to the Channel Tunnel; however, Eurotunnel rejected the request, citing safety and operational constraints. In early September 2026, Bushby said he had received special permission from the French government to swim across the English Channel, with a planned swimming date of 1 October. He resumed walking in Belgium in September, reached Tournai on 18 September and entered France on 20 September.

Bushby reached the United Kingdom on 5 October (precisely 28 years after he left Hull in 1998), after his English Channel swim. He stepped onto Shakespeare Beach, south of Dover, after approximately four days of swimming and resting on support boats. He was welcomed on the beach by friends and family, including his father, former SAS soldier Keith Bushby, and filmmaker Werner Herzog. Bushby and his team intentionally kept the departure location and time of the swim private due to the potential safety issues arising from the publicity. The first media publications about the swim were made approximately 24 hours after he stepped onto British soil. Bushby reached his home town of Hull on 2 November 2026, reuniting with his mother and family. Hull East MP Karl Turner read a message of congratulations from prime minister Andy Burnham, praising Bushby's "courage, resilience, perseverance and unbreakable spirit".

== Giant Steps ==
Bushby wrote a book about his walk titled Giant Steps, first published in 2005. The latest edition (2007) includes events up to 31 March 2006, and his Bering Strait crossing. The book and the Bering Strait crossing also inspired a board game called Ice Flow.

== See also ==
- List of pedestrian circumnavigators
- Paul Salopek, journalist travelling from Ethiopia to Tierra del Fuego on foot since 2013
