= List of pedestrian circumnavigators =

A circumnavigation of the Earth is a journey from a point around the globe, returning to the point of departure. In a pedestrian circumnavigation, travelers must move around the globe and return to their starting point by their own power, either walking or running. The Guinness Book of World Records sets the requirements for a circumnavigation on foot as having traveled 18,000 miles (29,000 km), and crossed four continents. The World Runners Association (WRA), a small club in the "ultrarunning" community, requirements are crossing four continents ocean to ocean and covering 26,232 kilometres (16,300 mi) in total among other requirements but does not have a time limit.

Attempts to walk around the world began as early as 1786. Starting in 1875, dozens of circumnavigation ultrawalkers emerged, most of them frauds who fooled the public to win wagers and made a living giving lectures about their supposed "walks". Later, a few legitimate walkers succeeded. The first legitimate ultrarunner to succeed is Konstantin Rengarten, and the most recent to succeed is Karl Bushby. The following list shows people who have, or claim to have, completed a circumnavigation on foot, sorted by date of departure.

== Pedestrian circumnavigators ==
Name	Dates	Duration	Distance	Description
Konstantin Rengarten	Aug. 15, 1894 – Sept. 27, 1898	4 years, 1 month, 13 days	26,876 kilometres (16,700 mi)	Rengarten was likely the true first person to walk around the world. Born in the Minsk province (today in Belarus), Rengarten started a walk from west to east with his starting point at Riga, the present-day capital of Latvia. He continued across Asia, through North America and Europe, and finished at his starting point on September 27, 1898.
George Matthew Schilling	1897–1904	~7 years	Unknown	The Guinness Book of World Records attributes the "first circumnavigation by walking" to both Schilling and David Kunst; however, Schilling's reputed walk was never verified. Schilling's walk has been met with heavy skepticism and is believed to have been impossible at the time. He never fully completed the circumnavigation. A few years later, he became a self-promoter by making false claims about outlandish stunts.
Arthur Blessitt	Dec. 25, 1969 – June 13, 2008	38 years, 5 months, 20 days	65,319 kilometres (40,587 mi)	Blessitt was an American preacher of Evangelical Christianity. Starting in 1969, Blessitt carried a cross through every nation of the world, with the goal of setting foot in every country and every island nation in the world. He completed this goal on June 13, 2008. He holds the Guinness world record for the "longest ongoing pilgrimage". During his life he walked 321 countries, including island groups, territories, and countries which no longer exist, of which 54 were in open war.
Dave Kunst	June 20, 1970 – Oct. 5, 1974	4 years, 3 months, 16 days	23,250 kilometres (14,450 mi)	Kunst became the first man independently verified to have walked around the world, covering four continents. His brother, John Kunst, accompanied him for two years from his starting point in Waseca, Minnesota, until he was killed by bandits in Afghanistan. Kunst continued the walk in his brother's honor. He completed his walk on October 5, 1974 after 14,500 miles. Kunst walked across four continents including North America, Europe, Asia, and Australia. He walked across Australia since he was unable to obtain permission to walk across China. Australia was selected since its widest point (2,500 miles) is comparable to the average width of China in miles.
Steven M. Newman	April 1, 1983 – April 1, 1987	4 years	23,335 kilometres (14,500 mi)	Newman became the second man independently verified to walk around the world on April 1, 1987, exactly four years after his departure. His walk was similar to Kunst's, covering four continents and 14,500 miles. Similar to Kunst, Newman's walk falls short of the minimum distance required by the WRA for membership. However, the WRA did not exist at the time of his walk. Like Kunst, Newman also had a gap between India and Thailand, and another gap in the Middle East.
Ffyona Campbell	Aug. 17, 1985 – Oct. 14, 1994	9 years, 1 month, 28 days	32,000 kilometres (20,000 mi)	Campbell became the third person and first woman claiming to have walked around the world. She carried out her walk in stages. In 1985, she walked from New York City to Los Angeles, across the United States. She later admitted to taking transport during one stretch, because she was ill, but had to meet sponsors' demands. She later returned to walk that stretch. In 1989, she walked from Sydney to Perth, in Australia. In 1991, she walked across Africa, from Cape Town, South Africa to Tangiers, Morocco. In 1995, she completed her walk. Her walk was carried out in stages and does not meet WRA standards.
Robert Garside	Oct. 20, 1997 – June 13, 2003	5 years, 7 months, 25 days	48,000 kilometres (30,000 mi)	Garside is a British runner credited by the Guinness Book of World Records as the first person to run around the world. Garside previously attempted two runs starting from Cape Town, South Africa, and London, England, but aborted both. In 1997, he began a run in New Delhi, India, and completed his run at the same point on June 13, 2003. His run was met with heavy skepticism, including from Kunst.
Karl Bushby	Nov. 1, 1998 – Nov. 2, 2026	28 years, 1 day	58,000 kilometres (36,000 mi)	Bushby is an English adventurer and author who completed the Goliath Expedition; starting from the southern tip of Chile and ending in his hometown of Hull, England. The expedition was expected to take 12 years, but numerous delays extended the expedition to 28 years.. Unusually for a pedestrian circumnavigation, Bushby's route did not make use of any planes or boats, preferring to walk or swim across the Darién Gap, the Bering Strait, the Caspian Sea and English Channel.
Polly Letofsky	1 August 1999 – 2004	5 years	Over 22,730 km (14,120 mi)	On 1 August 1999, Polly Letofsky left her home in Colorado on a five-year journey spanning 4 continents and 22 countries. She started her leg across Australia on 29 October 2000 from St Kilda Pier on Port Phillip Bay in Melbourne, and concluded on 22 July 2001 after arriving in Port Douglas. On 30 July 2004, she concluded her journey having walked over 22,730 km (14,120 mi), having raised over $250,000 for breast cancer research, and having officially become the first woman to have walked around the world.
Jean Beliveau	Aug. 18, 2000 – Oct. 15, 2011	11 years, 1 month, 29 days	75,000 kilometres (47,000 mi)	Beliveau became the fifth man to be independently verified as having walked around the world. Walking for 11 years and covering 75,000 km, Beliveau's walk is the longest continuous world walk and has preliminary qualification stage for recognition under the WRA guidelines.
Rosie Swale-Pope	Oct. 2, 2003 – Aug. 25, 2008	4 years, 10 months, 24 days	32,000 kilometres (20,000 mi)	First woman to run and walk the northern hemisphere. WRA ratified.
Jesper Kenn Olsen	Jan. 1, 2004 – Oct. 23, 2005	1 year, 9 months, 23 days	26,232 kilometres (16,300 mi)	Jesper Kenn Olsen ran 26,232 kilometres in his first world run.
Masahito Yoshida	Jan. 1, 2009 – June 9, 2013	4 years, 5 months, 9 days	40,000 kilometres (25,000 mi)	Masahito Yoshida, a Japanese man, walked approximately 40,000 km around the world. Starting from Shanghai on January 1, 2009, and returning on June 9, 2013, his journey took him across Asia, Europe, North America, and Australia. He faced challenges such as extreme weather and health issues but maintained a walking pace of around 30 km per day.
Tony Mangan	Oct. 25, 2010 – Oct. 27, 2014	4 years, 3 days	50,000 kilometres (31,000 mi)	Fourth runner to successfully run around the world. Having run 50,000 km, he holds the record for the longest world run according to the World Runners Association guidelines. Mangan is the third person to be inducted into the WRA membership.
Tom Denniss	Dec. 31, 2011 – Sept. 13, 2013	1 year, 8 months, 14 days	26,232 kilometres (16,300 mi)	Third runner credited with a proper documented world run under the World Runners Association rules. He holds the record for the fastest circumnavigation on foot and is the second person to be inducted into the WRA membership.
Kevin John Carr	July 28, 2013 – April 9, 2015	1 year, 8 months, 13 days	26,232 kilometres (16,300 mi)	WRA ratified. Fifth runner credited with a proper documented world run, he followed the WRA rules in his attempt to break Tom Denniss's record for the fastest circumnavigation of the world on foot.
Tom Turcich	April 2, 2015 – May 21, 2022	7 years, 1 month, 20 days	45,000 kilometres (28,000 mi)	Turcich became the tenth person to circumnavigate the globe on foot, by his own count. Turcich left his home in Haddon Township, New Jersey on April 2, 2015, walking across every continent except Australia, before returning to his starting point on May 21, 2022. In August 2015, Turcich adopted an Australian Shepherd in Austin, Texas, whom he named Savannah. Savannah became the first dog to circumnavigate the globe on paw.
Marie Leautey	Dec. 6, 2019 – Sept. 1, 2022	2 years, 3 months, 4 days (825 days)	28,249 kilometres (17,553 mi)	Seventh runner credited with a proper documented world run under the World Runners Association rules. She holds the record for the fastest circumnavigation on foot (woman) and is the seventh person to be inducted into the WRA membership.
Nicolò Guarrera	August 9, 2020 – September 13, 2025	5 years, 1 month, 5 days	36,000 kilometres (22,000 mi)	Guarrera is the first Italian to successfully complete the circumnavigation of the globe on foot. Guarrera left his home in Malo, Italy, on August 9, 2020, and came back at the same place on September 13, 2025, after a 36,000-km walk. He crossed western Europe, South America, Australia, India and the Middle East. He entered eastern Europe from Bulgaria, and crossed the last stretch until Italy and his home.

== See also ==
- List of circumnavigations
