= Arati Kumar-Rao =

Indian photographer

Arati Kumar-Rao is an Indian author and photographer. In 2023, she released her book Marginlands: Indian landscapes on the Brink and was added to the BBC's 100 Women list.

== Career ==
Arati Kumar-Rao was born in Bengaluru. She studied for an MBA at the Thunderbird School of Global Management, a Master of Education at Arizona State University and an MSc in Physics at the University of Pune, then worked at Intel. She decided in 2013 to leave her job and write about landscapes. On her Tumblr blog, River Diaries: Brahmaputra, she profiled the Brahmaputra River. She walked with writer Paul Salopek through the Indian states of Punjab and Rajasthan. In 2023, she released her book Marginlands: Indian landscapes on the Brink and was added to the BBC's 100 Women list.

== Selected works ==
- Kumar-Rao, Arati (2023). Marginlands: Indian Landscapes on the Brink. India: Picador. ISBN 978-9395624435.
