= Steven M. Newman =

American journalist (born 1954)

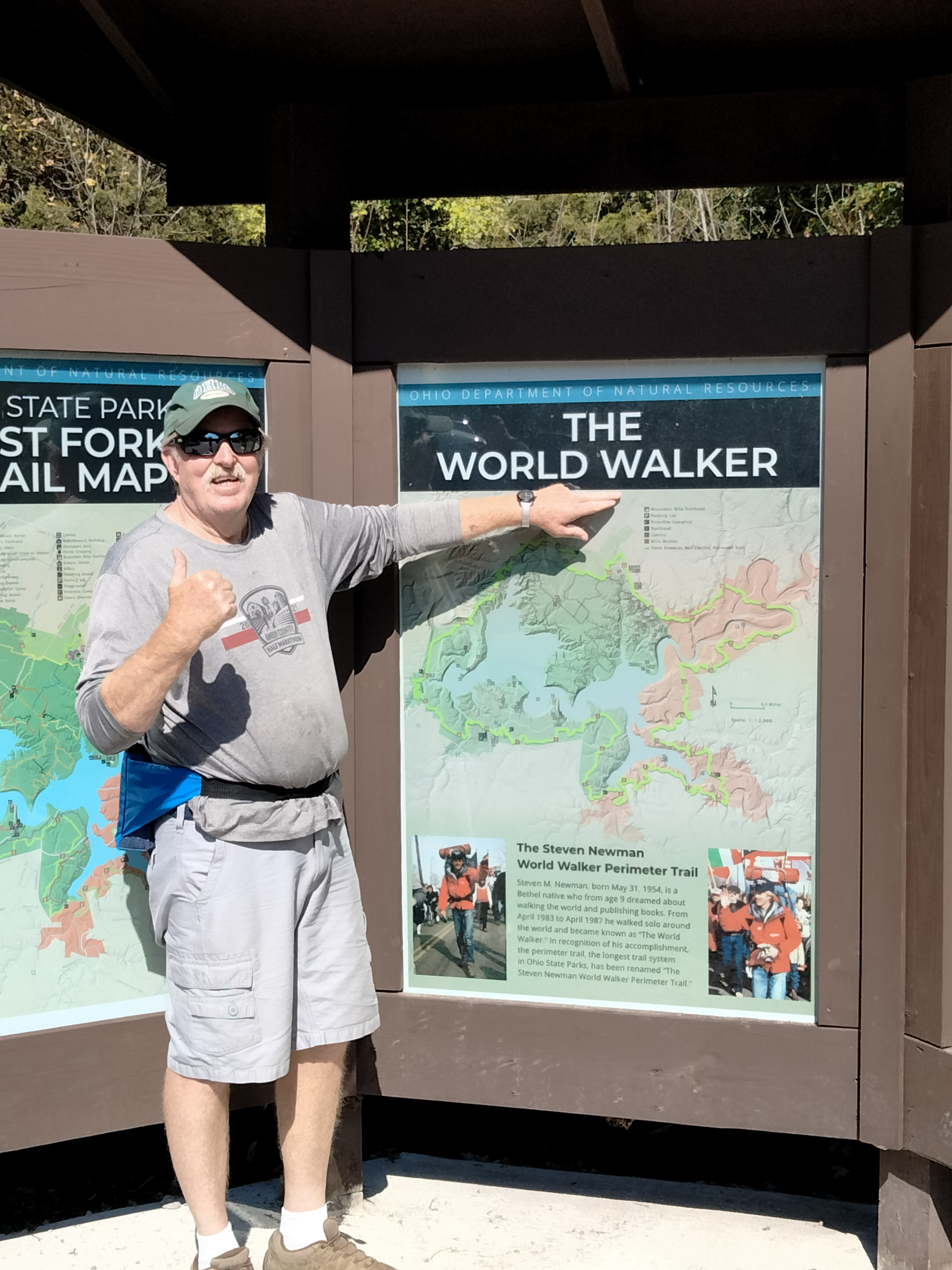
- Steve Newman at Worldwalker Perimeter Trail of East Fork State Park in Clermont County, Ohio.
- Born: May 31, 1954 (age 72); Bethel, Ohio, United States
- Other name: The Worldwalker
- Website: http://www.stevennewman.com/

Steven M. Newman (born May 31, 1954) is an American world trekker, public speaker and author. From April 1983 to April 1987, he walked solo around the world and became popularly known as "The Worldwalker". He is the author or co-author of two books. The longest hiking trail in Ohio's state park system, the Steven Newman Worldwalker Perimeter Trail at East Fork State Park, has been named after him.

== Career ==
Newman graduated from Ohio University in 1977 with a degree in journalism. He later returned to his hometown of Bethel to begin what would eventually be officially recognized as the first documented solo walk around the world, complete with having someone from each town he visited sign his log book. His walk around the world was recognized by the Guinness Book of World Records.

Newman aimed to look at the world (even staying with over 400 families during his travels), stating "I wanted it not only to be a look at the world, but a test of the world. I wanted to see how the world treated a stranger. I set out with the pledge to never ask for more than a drink of water, and if someone didn't offer me food, I would go hungry that day. If no one offered me a place to sleep, I would sleep on the ground."

Newman's walk took four years, spanning 21,000 miles (with flights done to get him from Boston to Ireland and other flights to Yugoslavia and Australia) and 40 million steps. His father, Edwin, died in 1984 while Newman was walking in India. Upon completing his walk, city officials in Bethel declared the day of his return an official holiday.

In 1989, William Morrow and Company published a book by Newman, Worldwalk, about his journey.

== Bibliography ==
- Steven Newman. Worldwalk 2012 Kindle Edition. ISBN 0-688-07762-5
- Steven Newman. Letters from Steven. 1987. ISBN 0-941678-09-1
- Sholly, Dan R.; Newman, Steven M. (1991). Guardians of Yellowstone: An Intimate Look at the Challenges of Protecting America's Foremost Wilderness Park. Morrow. ISBN 978-0-688-09213-9.

== See also ==
- List of pedestrian circumnavigators
