= Ffyona Campbell =

British woman who was the first woman to walk around the world

- Born: 1967 (age 58–59); Totnes, Devon, England
- Occupation: Writer
- Known for: Long-distance walking

Ffyona Campbell (born 1967 in Totnes, Devon) is an English long-distance walker who walked around the world between 1983 and 1995. She set off at the age of 16 and covered 32,000 kilometres (20,000 mi) over 11 years and raised £180,000 for charity. She was the youngest person to walk the length of Britain and the first person to walk the length of Africa. She wrote about her experience in a series of three books.

== Early life ==
During her childhood and early teens the Campbells moved home 24 times, which resulted in her attending 15 schools. Her elder sister, Shuna, suffered a brain haemorrhage at the age of 12 but her life was saved because the hospital had the loan of a CT scanner.

== Walks ==
After leaving home and school at 16, she raised the necessary sponsorship to enable her to walk from John o' Groats to Lands End. Walking 25 miles a day six days a week, she completed the journey in 49 days and was the youngest person at that time to have done it. Through sponsorship of the London Evening Standard, she raised £25,000 for the Royal Marsden Cancer Hospital which enabled them to buy a new CT scanner.

At 18, she set off from New York City crossing the United States towards Los Angeles. The media schedule to coincide with the sponsors' public relations events en route was demanding, requiring hours of interviews at the end of each long day.

At 21 she walked across Australia, 50 miles a day for 3,200 miles from Sydney to Perth in 95 days, beating the men's record for this journey. She suffered severe sunburn, dehydration as well as intense blistering of the feet but was determined not to miss out any miles. She wrote about this journey in her book Feet of Clay.

On 2 April 1991, she left Cape Town, South Africa and walked the length of Africa covering over 16,000 km (9,900 mi) before arriving in Tangiers, Morocco two years later on 1 September 1993. She had been joined by her former boyfriend, British survival expert Ray Mears, for five months during the journey through Zaire after an uprising had forced her and her team to abandon the support vehicle and be evacuated by the French Foreign Legion along with all the other expats. She was able to return to central Africa within weeks of the evacuation and continued walking from the place she had left. During the stretch across the Sahara, she walked an extra 4,000 km around a war zone to avoid missing out any steps. She reached Tangiers and was greeted by the international media. The walk raised awareness of Survival International, an organisation which helps protect the lives of threatened tribal people. She wrote about this journey in her book On Foot through Africa.

In April 1994, she left Algeciras, Spain and walked through Europe on the Via de la Plata through Spain, through France, crossing to Britain at Dover. She then completed the last 1,300 km (810 mi) walking from Dover back to John o' Groats accompanied by young people from Raleigh International who came to find out just how far they could walk if they really put their minds to it. She arrived at John O'Groat's, the world's end, on 14 October 1994. She was shadowed by a BBC film crew and presenter Janet Street-Porter. At the time, Campbell was hailed as the first woman to walk around the world.

Campbell raised half the amount for charity in one go when one of the organisers at Raleigh International sold the advertising space on her forehead during her well-publicised return. After a period in hospital for a back operation, she walked across America again for her own personal satisfaction as she had had to miss out a section in the middle due to illness. She wrote about that journey in her final book, The Whole Story.

=== Controversy ===
While crossing the United States in 1985 at the age of 18, she became too ill to walk but, concerned that her sponsors would withdraw their backing, she reluctantly accepted lifts in her back-up vehicle to keep to their schedule. Neither Campbell, nor Brian Noel, her support driver, know how many times this happened between Indianapolis, Indiana and Fort Sumner, New Mexico, a distance of some 1,000 miles. Brian Noel did not recall it happening at all when interviewed by the Daily Mail after Campbell wrote a book about this episode also detailing the second walk she'd made across the US to cover that stretch, plus another 1,500 miles to Los Angeles.

== Hunter-gatherer ==
Inspired by the hunter-gatherers she met on her journey – Aborigines, Bushmen, Pygmies and Native Americans – Campbell returned to Australia after the end of the world walk to live with the Aborigines. After three months she returned to Britain to learn how to be a hunter-gatherer in her own country and to work out what had separated us from the life we must have loved so much. She wrote about her adventures in her fourth book, The Hunter-Gatherer Way, and is now teaching others how to be hunter-gatherers in Britain through her company Wild Food Walks based in Devon.

== Books ==
- Feet of Clay: On Foot through Australia (1992). ISBN 0-434-10692-5
- On Foot through Africa (1994). ISBN 1-85797-946-X
- The Whole Story: A Walk Around the World (1997). ISBN 0-7528-0988-1
- The Hunter-Gatherer Way (2012). ISBN 978-0-9575408-0-4
- The Beat of a Different Drum: More stories from The Hunter-Gatherer Way (2017). ISBN 0-957-54081-7

== See also ==
- List of pedestrian circumnavigators
