= Worthing High School, West Sussex =

Worthing High School
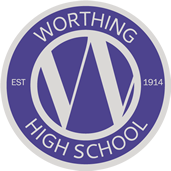

Location
- Worthing, West Sussex; England; 50°49′24″N 0°22′51″W

Information
- Type: Academy
- Motto: Always Pursue Excellence
- Established: 1905, merged 1982
- Local authority: West Sussex County Council
- Specialist: Business and Enterprise with Music & English college
- Department for Education URN: 139109 Tables
- Ofsted: Reports
- Chair of Governors: Louise Davey
- Head teacher: Alex Simpson
- Staff: 71
- Gender: Mixed
- Age: 11 to 16
- Enrolment: 1062
- Houses: Broadwater, Heene, Salvington, Tarring
- Colour: Purple
- Website: www.worthinghigh.net

Worthing High School is a secondary school with academy status located in Worthing, West Sussex. It caters to academic years 7-11 (ages 11–16) and has over 1050 students on roll. It was rated as good by OFSTED in its last inspection.

== History ==
The school has its origins as the Bedford Row Pupil teacher centre, a private school for girls, in January 1905. Within two years, it also took school leavers other than pupil teachers. The school was taken over by the local council in 1909, moving to its current site in 1914. It operated at a girls school on this site, with a junior house in Shelly Road between 1918 and 1930, apart from an evacuation to New Ollerton, Nottinghamshire in 1941, until it became a girls' grammar school under the changes of the Education Act 1944. It remained as a grammar school until the local authority reorganised provision in the town along three-tier comprehensive lines in 1973, when it became a girls' comprehensive high school for students aged 12 to 16. At this time it became known as Gaisford girls' high school. The school became co-educational in 1982 when it merged with West Tarring Secondary School for boys, then becoming known by its current name.

In 2008, the school became a Trust school under the rules of the Education and Inspections Act 2006. The school converted to academy status in December 2012. From 2015 it became a standard secondary school accepting its first cohort of Year 7 students since the 1973 reorganisation following the change in the age of transfer in Worthing. The school has been rated "good" with outstanding areas on its previous OFSTED inspection in April 2016.

== Notable alumni ==
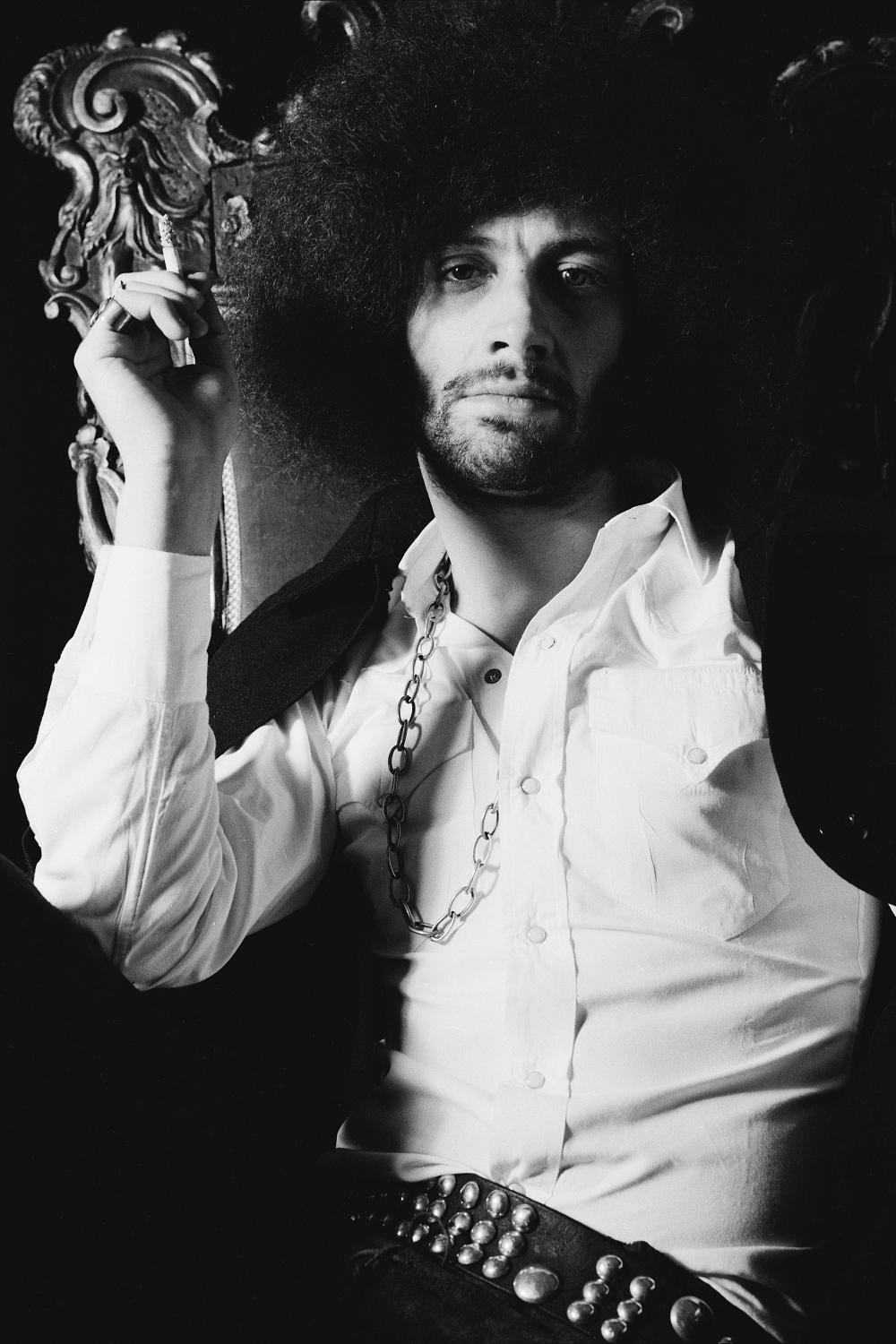
Mick Farren, Singer and founder of The Deviants

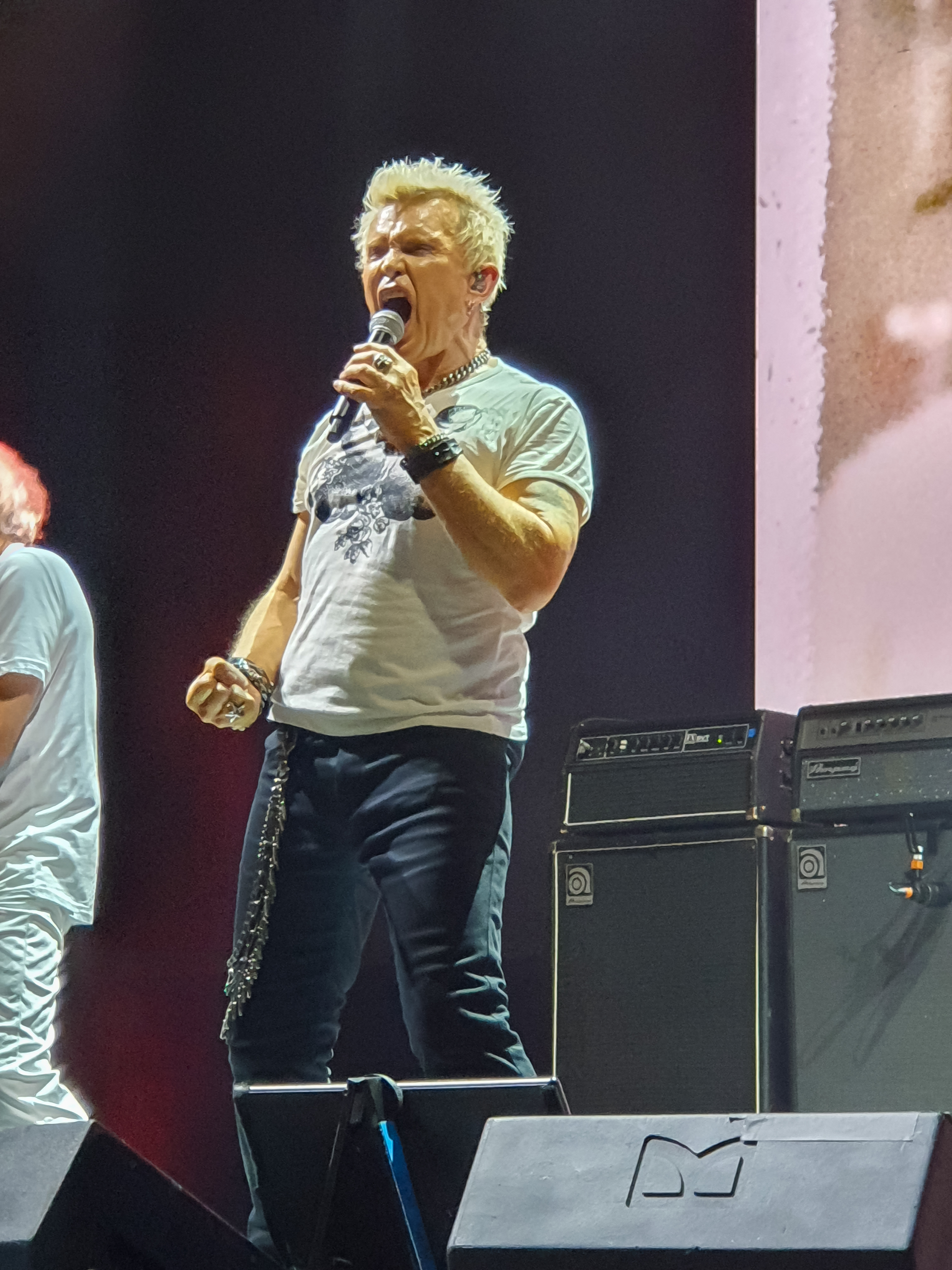
Billy Idol, Grammy winning recording artist

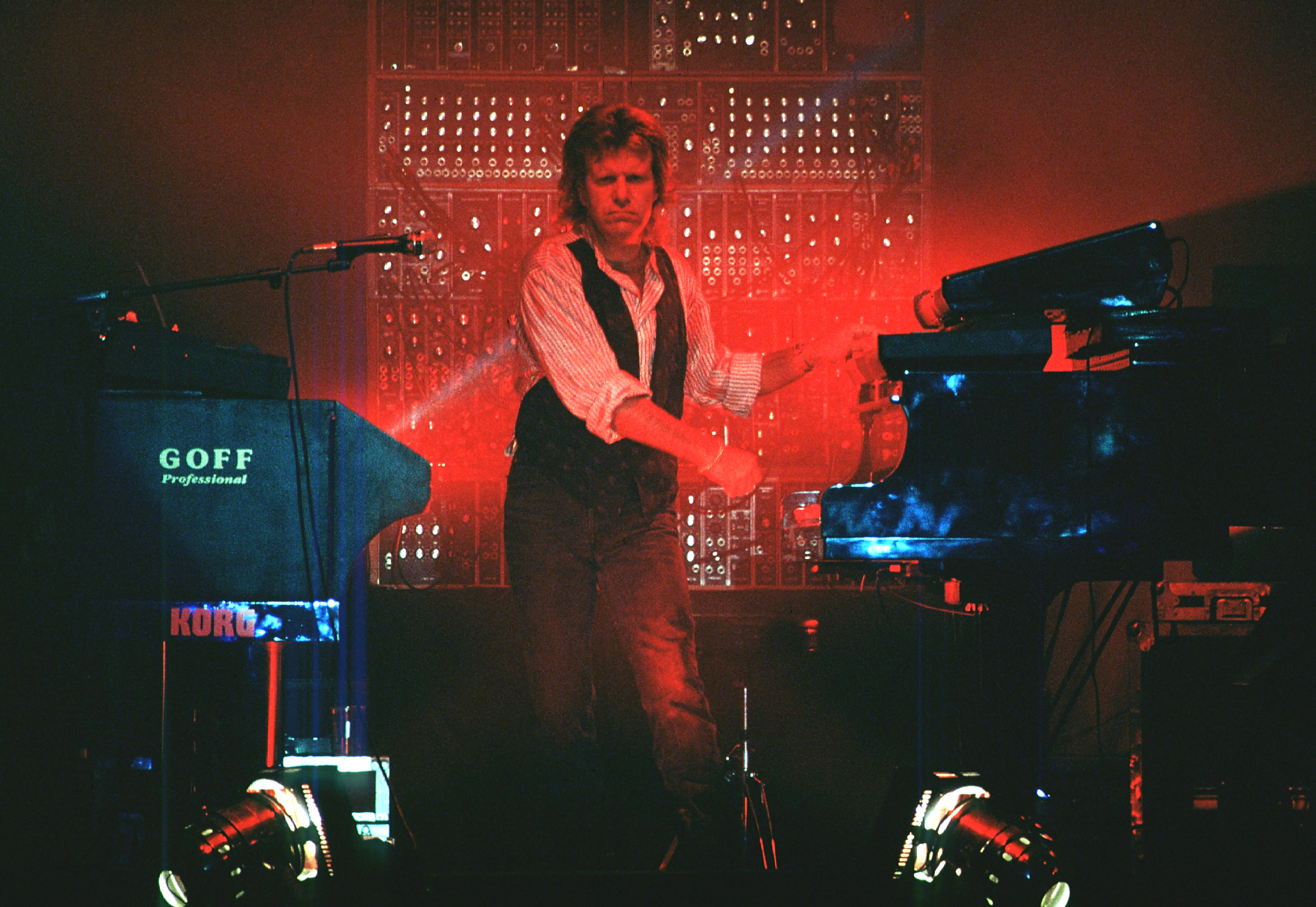
Keith Emerson, Member of Emerson, Lake & Palmer and The Nice, nicknamed "The greatest keyboarist in Rock history"

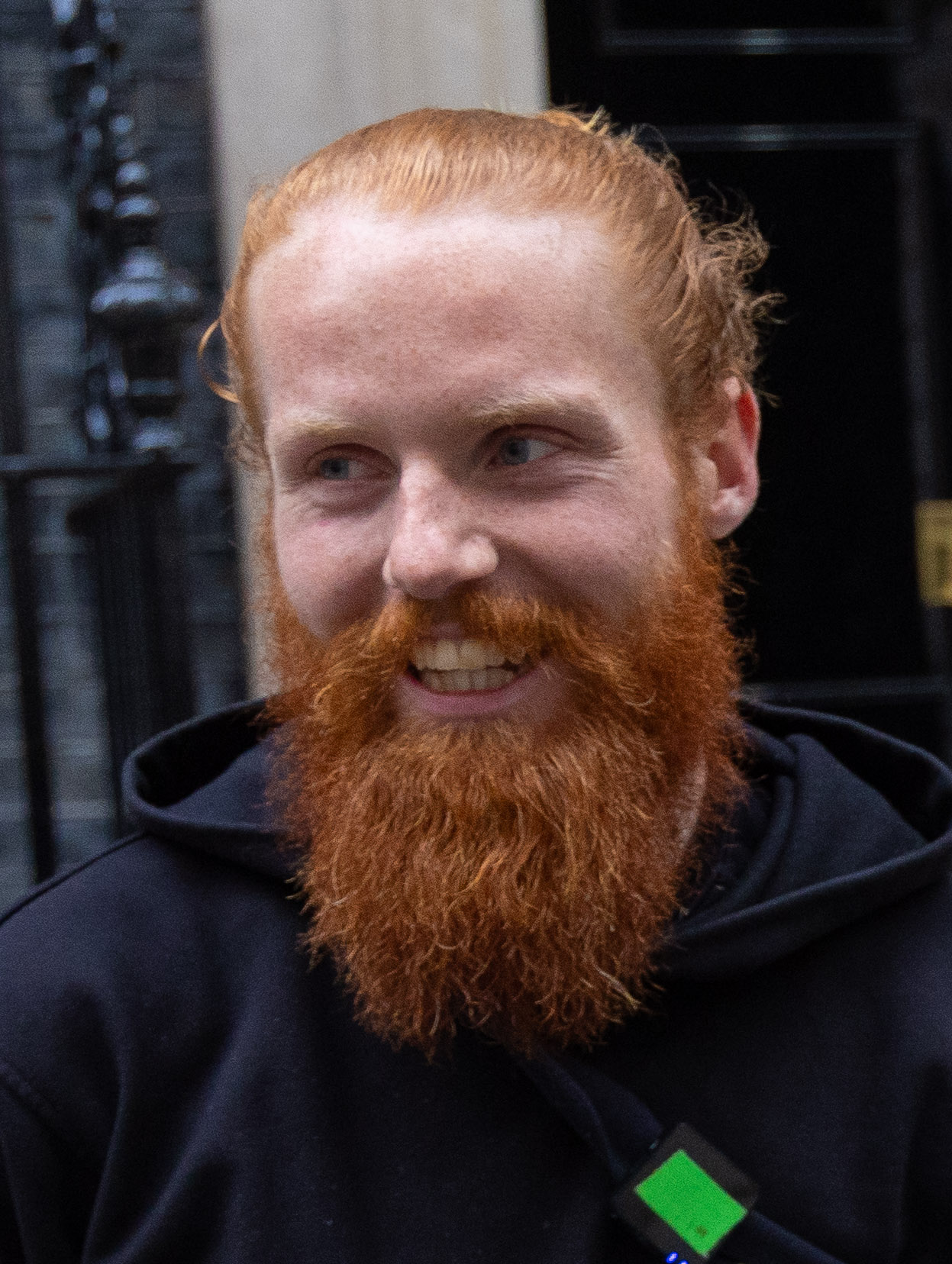
Russ Cook, the first man to run the entire length of Africa.

== Notable faculty ==
- Nick Hallard - English artist known for his pub signs.

== Gallery ==
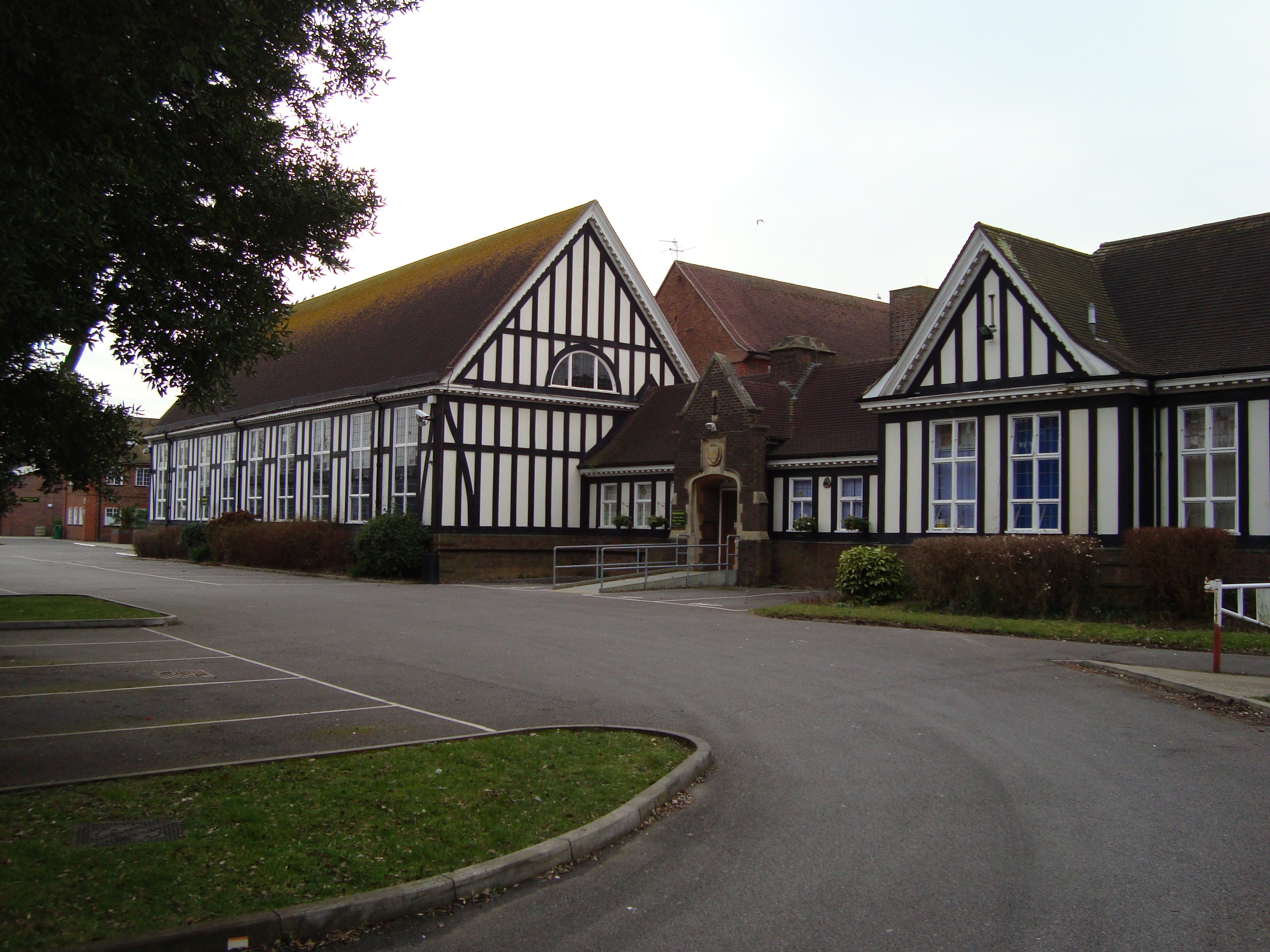

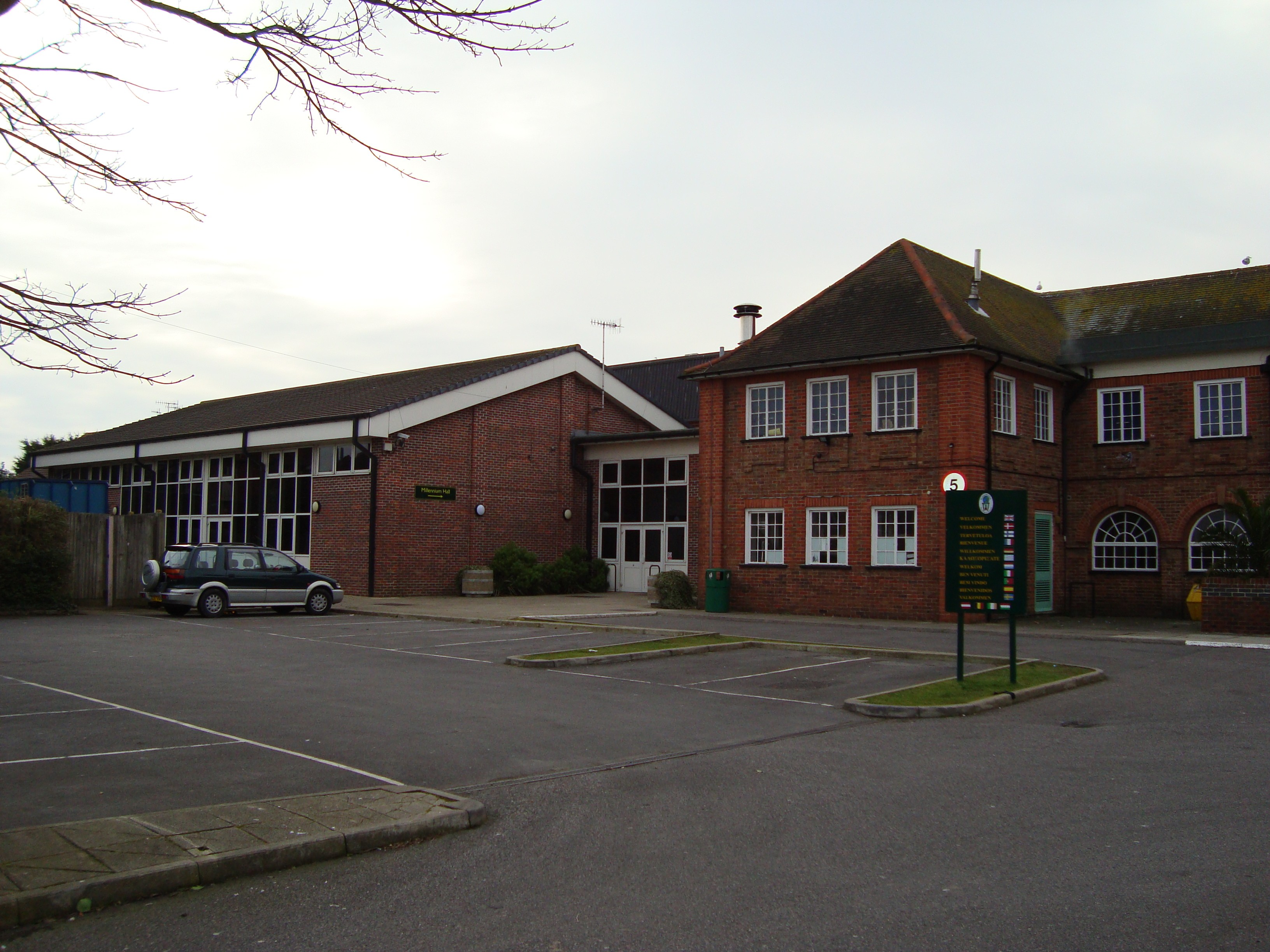

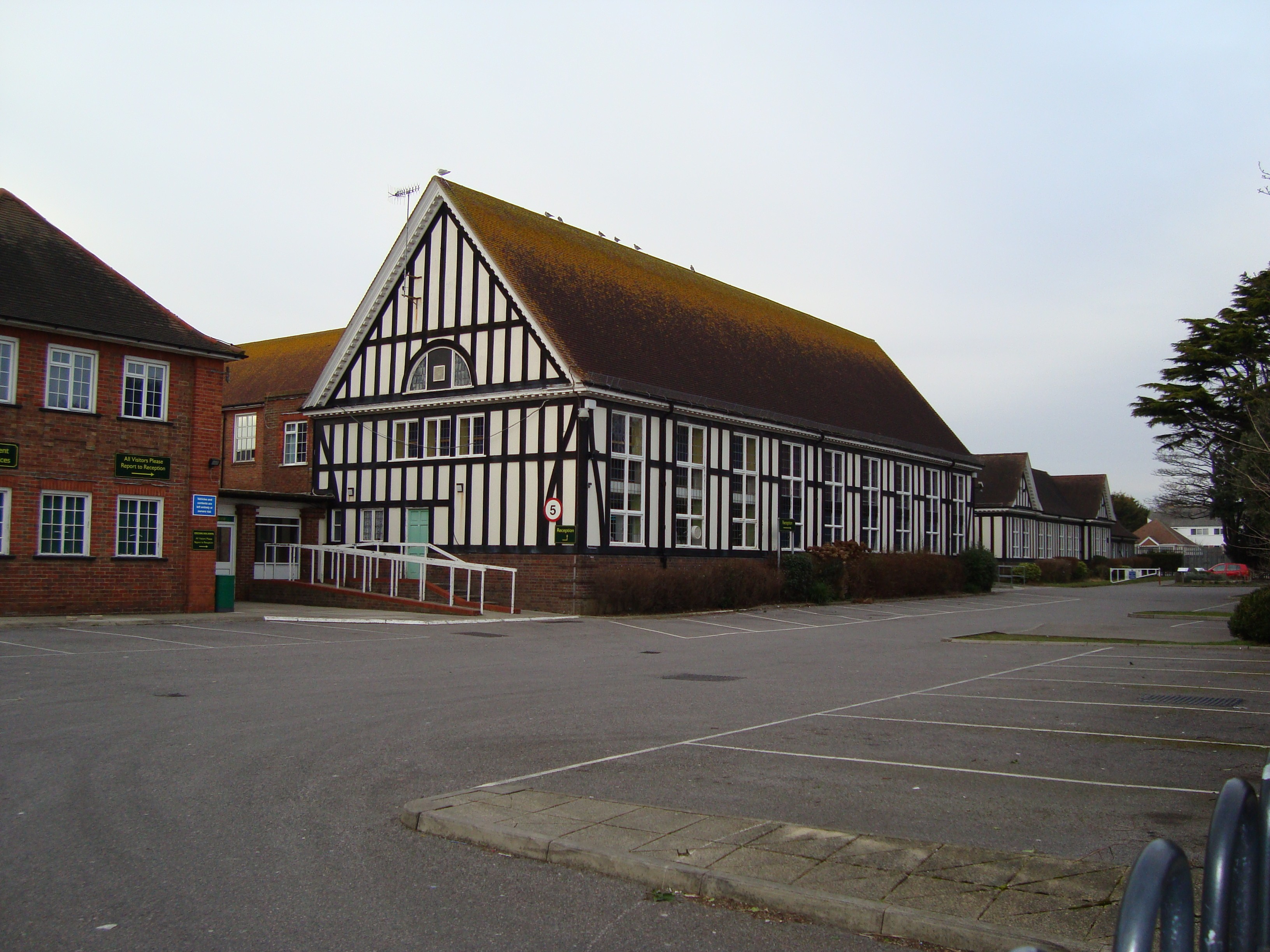
