= Hillcrest Grammar School =

Location
- Beech Avenue; Stockport, Greater Manchester, SK3 8HB; England; 53.39544°N 2.15633°W

Information
- Type: Other independent school
- Established: 1940
- Closed: 2014
- Department for Education URN: 106145 Tables
- Headmaster: Richard Mace
- Gender: Coeducational
- Age: 3 to 16
- Houses: 2: Warren & Heaton
- Colours: Red & black
- Website: www.hillcrestgrammar.co.uk

Hillcrest Grammar School in Cale Green, Stockport, Greater Manchester was a private day school with around 200 pupils aged 3 to 16. The school was founded as a boys' preparatory school in 1940 on Hillcrest Road in Bramhall. It became co-educational in the 1950s and also started to take pupils up to age 16 and added Grammar to its title. The school moved in 1983 to the former "Stockport High School for Girls" building built in 1910 in the Cale Green district of Stockport, close to Davenport railway station. The old part of the building is locally listed. A sports hall with four badminton courts was built in 1994 and a new pre-preparatory department in 2003. A new Preparatory Building with facilities for the Nursery was opened by Olympic Swimmer Michael Rock in October 2009. The school closed in July 2014 due to financial issues that began in 2007.

Hillcrest was accredited by the Independent Schools Council. The school was owned and operated by a registered charity "Hillcrest Grammar School (Bramhall Educational Trust Limited)", which is also a limited company.

== Notable former pupils and history ==
Past pupils include TV presenter Yvette Fielding, known especially as the youngest presenter of Blue Peter, former professional footballer Nicky Summerbee, Robert Garside the first person to run around the world, and music composer and producer Daniel Liam Glyn.

Hillcrest occupied the site of the former Stockport High School for Girls. Stockport High was founded in 1894. It merged with Fylde Lodge High School in 1974, to form Priestnall School (at the time, a single sex comprehensive school with a sixth form). Priestnall occupies the old Fylde Lodge site. The Stockport High School site has been used by Hillcrest since 1983. Stockport High School for Girls was the inspiration for Dame Joan Bakewell's novel "All the Nice Girls".

== Uniform crest and motto ==
In the early days, whilst still at the Hillcrest Road site, the blazer was red with silver braid. The tie had red and silver stripes. Boys wore a grey cap and girls a grey hat, both with red stripes. Later, Hillcrest pupils, both boys and girls, wore a black blazer with a red braid around the edge and a black tie, crest embedded with gold and red stripes. The school crest consisted of a flaming torch with the motto "Ad Lucem".
