= Tom Denniss =

Australian athlete, inventor, scientist (born 1961)

Tom Denniss (born 24 February 1961) is an Australian athlete, inventor, scientist, and entrepreneur. A Doctor of Mathematics and Oceanography, he invented a technology to convert energy in ocean waves into electricity, also played professional rugby league, was a finalist in the Australian of the Year Award, and in 2013 set a new world record for the Fastest Circumnavigation of the Earth on Foot.

== Early life ==
Denniss was born in 1961 in Wollongong, south of Sydney, Australia. He attended Warilla North Primary School from 1966 to 1973, and Lake Illawarra High School from 1974 to 1979, and was Student Council President at high school in 1979. From 1980 to 1982, Denniss completed a degree in Mathematics at the University of Wollongong, and a Diploma in Education from the University of New South Wales in 1983. A professional musician in his early life, Denniss has played to audiences in eight different countries.

== Career ==
Initially a high school maths teacher, Denniss taught at Newtown High School in Sydney from 1984 to 1990. While working at Newtown High, he attended UNSW part-time during 1988/89, obtaining a First Class Honours degree in Science. In 1990, Denniss left teaching to pursue a PhD in Mathematics and Oceanography at the same university. While completing his doctorate, from 1990 to 1994, he was an Associate Lecturer in the School of Mathematics at UNSW.

From 1994 to 1999, Denniss worked at Macquarie Bank, a leading Australian investment bank. In 2005 he was invited by Jeffrey Sachs, Special Adviser to the UN Secretary General, to be a member of the Global Roundtable on Climate Change, serving on this forum until 2009. At a ceremony in Hawaii in 2007, Denniss was the first person to be inducted into the International Ocean Energy Hall of Fame as an ocean energy pioneer.

Denniss served as the Australian Government's representative on the International Energy Agency's Ocean Energy Systems Committee from 2007 to 2011 and on the Australian Government's Advisory Board for the Clean Energy Innovation Centre in 2010–11.

== World run ==
On 31 December 2011, Denniss began a quest to run around the world. He set a new world record and while doing so raised money for Oxfam. Denniss completed the 26,232 km journey on 13 September 2013, becoming just the second person to successfully complete a fully documented world run according to the rules defined by the sport's international governing body, the World Runners Association, in the process setting a new world record of 622 days for the Fastest Circumnavigation of the Earth on Foot. His accomplishment was the equivalent of running 622 marathons in 622 days in extremes of heat and cold.

== Sporting achievements ==
Denniss was a member of the Warilla North Primary School 4 x 100-metre relay team which won three consecutive New South Wales state titles from 1971 to 1973, setting state records in 1971 (Junior Boys 57.4 sec) and 1973 (Senior Boys 52.7 sec). He was also a member of the Lake Illawarra High 15 years 4 x 100-metre relay team in 1976 which won the New South Wales Combined High Schools state title in record time (45.4 sec).

As a 17-year-old in 1978, Denniss was selected as a reserve in the NSW Combined High Schools Rugby League team. The same year he was chosen to play first grade for the Warilla-Lake South Gorillas rugby league team in the NSW South Coast Rugby League competition. He was a regular First Grader until his retirement from the game in late 1982, the same year he was selected to play in the NSW Country Team in the NSWRL's annual City versus Country match. Denniss was also the leading try scorer in the South Coast competition in 1980 and 1981 for the Warilla Gorillas.

Denniss has also run 100 metres in 10.90 seconds (24 July 1978) and 100 km in 9 hours 26 mins 12 secs (2 May 2008). It has been postulated he is the only person to have run both 100 metres in less than 11 seconds and 100 km in less than 11 hours.

== Awards, records, and recognition ==
- 2005 – Member of the Global Roundtable on Climate Change
- 2007 – First person to be inducted into the International Ocean Energy Hall of Fame
- 2014 – Finalist in the Australian of the Year Awards
- 2014 – Officially awarded the world record for the Fastest Circumnavigation of the Earth on Foot by the sport's governing body, the World Runners Association.

== Bibliography ==
Tom Denniss, The World At My Feet 1 July 2015 – autobiographical account of his world run
