= Ian Champion =

British actor

- Born: 1968 (age 57–58); Portsmouth, England
- Education: East 15 Acting School
- Occupation: Actor

Ian Champion (born 1968 in Portsmouth) is an English film, theatre, television and voice actor who has appeared in television movies and soap operas such as Coronation Street, Emmerdale and Brookside.

== Early life ==
Raised initially in Portsmouth while his father was in the Navy, Ian's family relocated to Sheffield in 1976.

Ian toured with the Sheffield Youth Theatre as a teenager under the guidance of director Meg Jepson (playing among others Romeo, Shylock and Odysseus), which honed his appreciation of classical theatre, particularly Shakespeare.

== Education ==
He went on to study at East 15 Acting School from 1989 to 1992, when the school was still run by its founder Margaret Walker and her husband Artistic Director Wilf Walker. East 15 was one of the foremost Stanislavski/Method schools and Ian has always maintained that the urban myth rumours about it were actually less interesting than the true stories. He was one of only three students in the school's history to have undertaken two of the infamous Method-immersive War Projects at East 15's Sheriff Hutton base, in both his first and second year.

After East 15, Ian toured briefly in children's theatre and in 1993 was at the Edinburgh Festival in Much Ado About Nothing with Patrick Baladi and James D'Arcy.

== Career ==
After adding screen training with Sean Cotter at the Academy of Live and Recorded Arts in London, Champion began working in television. He began as devilish Piers Brunswick, an old flame of Anna Brecon's Lady Tara in Emmerdale (the first of four roles in the show between 1997 and the present), and has a range of credits including Brookside, Heartbeat, Hollyoaks, and At Home with the Braithwaites.

In 2000, Ian was cast as two generations of the evil Earl of Shrewsbury in the long-running film still accompanying Alton Towers' Hex thrill-ride, in which he plays both the grandfather and his mad-scientist grandson attempting to free themselves of a fatal family curse.

In 2005 Ian played the TV Reporter in Granada's highly acclaimed TV movie See No Evil: The Hunt For the Moors Murderers, filmed on many of the original locations.

Since then, Ian's TV credits have also featured Coronation Street (as a bank manager mistakenly threatened by Kirk), roles in Sorted, Sinchronicity, The Royal, Survivors and in Five Days 2 as a consultant breaking the news to Anne Reid and Bernard Hill of her vascular dementia.

Champion has recorded TV commercials, for example as the Salesman in three Sealy Beds commercials since 2006. He has also appeared in four other major brand TV adverts to date including Vodafone and most recently in September 2010 worked with Manchester City's Carlos Tevez in a TV commercial for Pepsi to be screened in Argentina, where Ian plays an awards-show presenter welcoming the football star on-stage for some Spanish banter with Eber Ludueno.

In 2007 he published his first book Acting On Purpose (ISBN 978-1847999078) for students and professionals.

In November 2010 Champion made his BBC Radio 4 debut in `the play Eclipse as Maurice.

In 2017, Champion provided the voice for the villain Olof as well as the Dupa Genetics VO in the video game Paradigm.
