= Dave Kunst =

American who walked around the Earth

- Born: July 16, 1939 (age 87); Caledonia, Minnesota; USA
- Occupation: Adventurer
- Website: http://davekunst.com/

Dave Kunst (born July 16, 1939) is the first person independently verified to have walked around the Earth. The walk was intended to be achieved along with his brother John, but during the event John was shot and killed by bandits, and Dave wounded; Dave resumed and completed the walk with another brother, Peter. His walk was officially stated to be 23,250 kilometres (14,450 mi).

Kunst's walk may not have been the first circumnavigation by foot; Guinness World Records mentions George Matthew Schilling as being reputed to have circumnavigated the globe between 1897 and 1904.

== Walk ==
Kunst's trek began on June 20, 1970, and ended October 5, 1974. Dave started his journey in Waseca, Minnesota with his brother John, a letter of recommendation from U.S. Senator Hubert Humphrey, a scroll to be signed by officials along the way, $1000 and a mule named Willie Makeit carrying camping supplies.

The brothers walked to New York City with Willie Makeit, then flew to Portugal, where they acquired a second mule (Willie stayed home). Dave and John walked across Europe and visited Monaco, where they met Princess Grace, and Italy, where they encountered Thor Heyerdahl.

During their travels, the brothers asked people to send donations to UNICEF; a reporter in Afghanistan mistakenly wrote that they collected and carried them. John was killed when bandits shot him in the mountains of Afghanistan in October 1972. Dave was shot in the chest during the same attack, but survived by playing dead. After spending four months recovering from his injuries, Dave resumed his journey, along with his brother Peter, from the spot where John was killed. He travelled from New Delhi to Kolkata in 44 days. He reached Kolkata on 7th Sept 1973. As they continued their travels, Dave and Peter were denied access to the Soviet Union, so they flew from India to Australia.

Peter returned home during the Australia leg of the trek, where Dave continued on alone, by this time on his third mule. Unfortunately, the mule died and Dave was left hauling his wagon of supplies himself. He was on the verge of abandoning his supplies when he fortuitously met Jenni Samuel, a schoolteacher from Perth. She helped pull his wagon with her car, while he walked alongside. Dave returned to Australia for a year after completing his journey. Jenni and Dave later married and were still together as of 2013.

"I walked 20 million steps" Dave says, figuring 31 steps per 100 feet "I wore out 21 pairs of shoes but I proved something to myself: If a human being makes up his mind, is determined, sets goals, he can walk around the world."

The brothers were commemorated in June 2004 with a sign in their hometown of Caledonia, Minnesota. The inscription reads: "Caledonia: Birthplace of the Earthwalkers David, Peter and John Kunst."

He also appeared in the Guinness world record book in several editions.

== See also ==
- List of pedestrian circumnavigators

== Additional Resources ==
- The Papers of David Kunst are available for research use at the Minnesota Historical Society.
