= Tony Mangan (runner) =

Irish ultramarathon runner (born 1957)

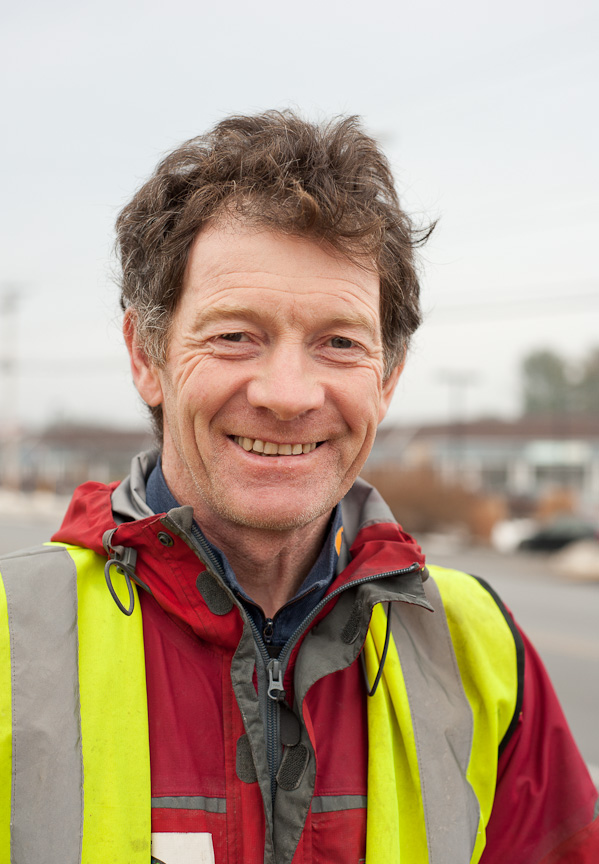
- Mangan in Kittery, Maine, 2011

Personal information
- Nationality: Irish
- Born: 20 April 1957 (age 69)
- Website: theworldjog.com/blog/

Achievements and titles
- Personal best: World Records 48 hours indoor track world record 426.178 km held since 2007. World 48-hour treadmill record 405.22 km held since 2008

Tony Mangan (born 20 April 1957 in Dublin) is an ultra distance runner from Ireland. He completed on 27 October 2014 a 50,000 km (31,000 mi) distance running around the world for Aware, a charity helping to defeat depression. He is the current world 48-hour indoor track record holder 426.178 km (264.815 mi). Also the world 48-hour treadmill record 405.22 km. Mangan states, "I didn't start running till I was almost 30. Then I dreamed of running around the World. I got delayed for over 20 years for many reasons, breaking a few world ultra records. Now I am retired from competition I can finally live my dream."

== World Jog ==
Tony's "World Jog", began with his participation in the Dublin Marathon on 25 October 2010. He moved from east to west, commencing in Ireland North America, before proceeding to Central and South America and on to Australia, Asia and Europe before returning to Ireland. He finished on 27 October 2014, to finish where he started with the Dublin marathon.

Mangan's completed a distance of approximately 50,000 km over a four-year period of near-continuous travel. This involves running roughly the distance of a marathon per day. Mangan made the journey as continuous as possible on a world map. Each day he ran with his buggy, named Nirvana, which is best known in the U.S. as a runner's stroller. It has one small wheel in the front and two large ones in the back. Mangan packs a tent, tarp, extra shoes, clothes and some food where most runners would sit an infant or toddler.

== Other achievements ==
Current World 48-hour indoor track record holder. In 2007 Tony Mangan received the IAU (International Association of Ultrarunners) recognition for "the new World Best Performance 48h indoor by Men" for his extraordinary race, 426.178 km ran during the Jami BRNO Spring Ultramarathon, 48h Indoor. This was also the first time in history that a runner has run 200 km for two consecutive days. On day one Tony ran 223 km while on day two he ran 203 km. He is also known for his 48h treadmill records. Tony's 48-hour treadmill attempt record was registered in 2003 along with a 24‑hour treadmill world record. His 48-hour performance was broken in 2004 by another runner but Tony regained his status at the Longford marathon expo in 2008 when he ran the "greatest distance travelled on a treadmill in 48 hours, 405.22 km (251.79 mi)", result acknowledged by the Guinness World Records.

== Personal Bests ==
- 1 mile - 4 min 50 s - Santry, Dublin
- 2 miles - 9 min 50 s - Santry, Dublin
- 5 km road - 16 min 27 s - The Liberties, Dublin
- 10 km road - 33 min 1 s - Phoenix Park, Dublin
- 1/2 marathon - 75 min 30 s - Wales, UK
- 20 miles - 1 h 58 min - Clonliff 20miler, Dublin
- Marathon - 2 h 38 min 29 s - Finglas Marathon, Dublin
- 50 km - 3 h 55 min - Colorado Springs, United States
- 50 miles - 7 h 30 min - Colorado Springs, United States
- 100 km - 8 h 44 min - Celtic Plate, Phoenix Park, Dublin
- 100 miles - (split in 24-hour) 16 h 15 min - World Championships, Taipei, Taiwan
- 24 hours track - 223 km former Irish record. - European Championships, Verona, Italy
- 24 hours road - 228.299 km Former Irish record. - World Championships, Taipei, Taiwan
- 24 hours indoors - (split in 48-hour race) 223 km Current Irish indoor record - Brno, Czech Republic
- 24 hours treadmill - 222 km former world treadmill and current Irish record. - Dublin Marathon Expo, Dublin
- 48 hours road - 340 km Current Irish road record. - Arizona, United States
- 48 hours track - 401.115 km Current Irish record. - Surgeres, France
- 48 hours indoors - 426.178 km Current World Indoor Record. - Brno, Czech Republic
- 48 hours treadmill - 405.08 km Current World Treadmill Record. - Marathon Expo, Longford, Ireland
- 72 hours road - Former Irish record. - 450 km - Arizona, United States

== See also ==
- List of pedestrian circumnavigators
