= Walk for Peace USA =

2025–2026 Buddhist pilgrimage across the United States promoting peace

- Part of Walk for Peace
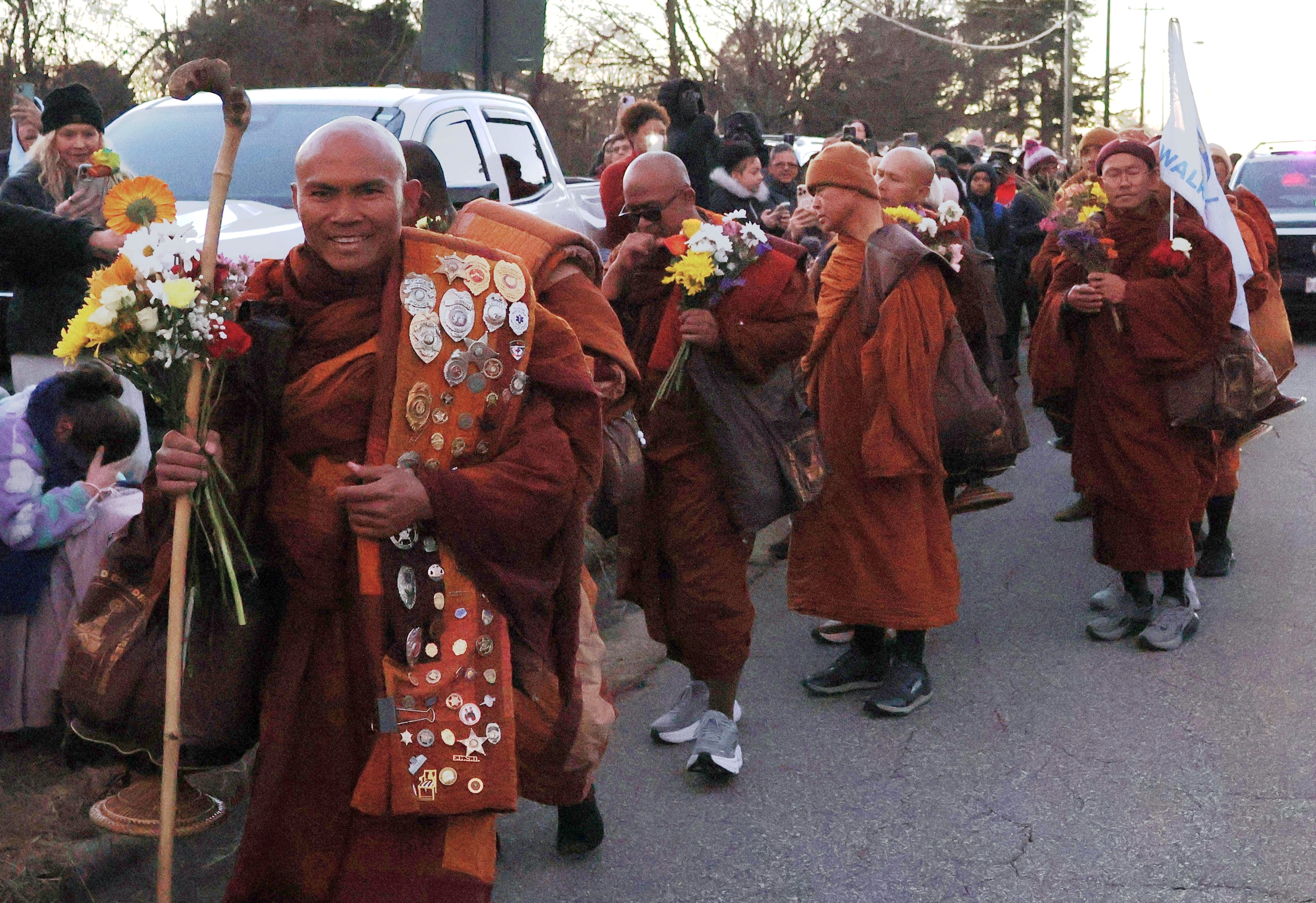
- Bhikkhu Paññakāra leading the walk in Greensboro, North Carolina
- English name: Walk for Peace 2026
- Date: October 26, 2025 – February 14, 2026
- Venue: Public roads and communities
- Location: United States
- Also known as: Walk for Peace in USA
- Type: Peace walk; Buddhist pilgrimage
- Theme: Peace, Compassion, Nonviolence, Mindfulness
- Cause: Promotion of peace and interfaith dialogue
- Motive: Advocacy for nonviolence and compassion
- Target: General public
- Organised by: Walk for Peace USA
- Participants: Buddhist monks, volunteers, supporters
- Outcome: Increased public awareness and community engagement for peace
- Route: Texas; Louisiana; Mississippi; Alabama; Georgia; South Carolina; North Carolina; Virginia; Washington, D.C.
- Other stops: Maryland; Tennessee
- Distance: Approximately 2,300 miles (3,700 km)
- Accompanied by a rescue dog named Aloka.

The Walk for Peace USA was a long-distance pilgrimage in the United States initiated by Buddhist monks from the Hương Đạo Vipassana Bhavana Center in Fort Worth, Texas, to Washington, D.C., promoting peace, compassion, and nonviolence.

The walk began on October 26, 2025, and spanned approximately 2,300 miles (3,700 km). They arrived in D.C. on February 10, 2026, after 108 days. The monks were accompanied by a dog named Aloka, who became a symbolic figure throughout the journey.

The monks documented their travels on multiple social media platforms. Since creating their Facebook page on November 8, 2025, it has grown rapidly, reaching 1 million followers on January 11, 2026, and 2 million just 11 days later. They have 2.9 million followers on Facebook and 1.9 million followers on Instagram as of March 24, 2026.

== Background ==
The pilgrimage was organized by a group of 24 monks from the Theravada Buddhist tradition, affiliated with the Hương Đạo Vipassana Bhavana Center in Fort Worth, TX initiated by Bhikkhu Paññakāra. Inspired by the teachings of Gautama Buddha, the Walk for Peace aimed to raise "awareness of peace, loving kindness, and compassion across America and the world."

== Route and progress ==
Buddhist monks "Walk for Peace", Alexandria, VA

The walk began in Fort Worth, Texas, following a route through the southeastern United States, passing through states including Louisiana, Mississippi, Alabama, and Georgia. Their path then went north through the Carolinas and Virginia before concluding in Washington, D.C. The monks maintain a walking pace of more than 20 miles a day. They usually started their walk between 6:30 to 7:00 AM.

A "peace sharing talk" was held by them at their lunch break every day, weather permitting. Another talk was conducted at their night rest stop, in addition to visiting opportunities for the public. Three of the monks, including the head monk Venerable Bhikkhu Paññākāra, chose to make part of the trek barefoot.

They handed out "peace bracelets" to those they encounter, a Buddhist symbol of protection and blessings.

The walk was positively received in various communities, with local news outlets and social media users highlighting the unique sight of the group traveling on foot in traditional robes.

=== Traffic accident ===
On November 19, 2025, while the monks were walking along U.S. Highway 90 near Dayton, Texas, a truck struck the group's escort vehicle. The impact pushed the escort into two monks walking on the roadside, and resulted in serious injuries to two monks. One monk, Phra Ajarn Maha Dam Phommasan, suffered significant trauma and was transported by helicopter to Memorial Hermann Hospital, in Houston. Jesse, a lay volunteer who was invited to join the monks when the Walk for Peace began in Texas, received treatment by ambulance for less severe injuries.

Venerable Bhante Dam Phommasan's injuries were severe enough that he underwent surgery in early December, which resulted in the amputation of the shank, or lower half, of his leg, and foot. According to statements from the Walk for Peace community, he recovered under medical care and remained in good spirits. Despite his injuries, organizers indicated that the group would continue the pilgrimage and requested continued support and compassion from followers. After healing, Jesse returned to the road continuing the journey with the same heart and dedication.

In early January 2026, the injured monk returned to Wat Lao Buddha Khanti in Snellville, GA and reunited with the Walk for Peace group after his recovery.

== Accolades ==
The venerable monks have received numerous accolades from government officials in the form of executive proclamations, legislative resolutions, certificates of recognition, commemorative plaques, and a sheriff's commendation.

They have also received a number of challenge coins, pins, and badges — most notably from the sheriff, police, and fire departments whose service members have escorted them along their journey.

The first-ever Joint Proclamation between Clayton County, the Clayton County Chair and Board of Commissioners, and the Mayors, was issued in honor of the monks.

North Carolina Governor Josh Stein became the first U.S. Governor to meet with the venerable monks. Virginia Governor Abigail Spanberger became the second U.S. governor to meet with the venerable monks, and issued her first-ever proclamation as governor in their honor.

Date	Jurisdiction	Official	Accolade
10/19/2025	Texas	State Representative Salman Bhojani	House Resolution.
10/26/2025	Fort Worth, TX	City Council Member Deborah Peoples	Special Recognition.
10/26/2025	Haltom City, TX	Mayor An Truong	Proclamation of Walk for Peace Day.
10/26/2025	Texas	State Representative Nicole Collier	House Resolution.
11/5/2025	Austin, TX	Director of Community Engagement Philip Dulin	Proclamation of Walk for Peace Day.
11/6/2025	Manor, TX	Council Member Anne Weir	Proclamation of Walk for Peace Day.
11/12/2025	Brookshire, TX	Mayor Robert Richards	Proclamation.
11/14/2025	Texas	State Representative Suleman Lalani	House Resolution.
12/2/2025	Pineville, LA	Mayor Joseph E. Bishop	Proclamation.
12/5/2025	Natchez, MS	Alderwoman Felicia Bridgewater-Irving	Certificate of Recognition.
12/7/2025	Port Gibson, MS	Mayor Willie A. White	Resolution of Recognition and Appreciation.
12/10/2025	Jackson, MS	Director of Communications Nic Lott	Proclamation of Greetings and Support.
12/14/2025	Meridian, MS	Mayor Percy Bland III	Proclamation.
12/19/2025	Selma, AL	Mayor Johnny Moss III	Proclamation.
12/23/2025	Alabama	State Representative Phillip Ensler	House Resolution.
12/23/2025	Alabama	State Representative Kenyatté Hassell	House Resolution.
12/23/2025	Montgomery, AL	Mayor Steven L. Reed	Proclamation of Walk for Peace.
12/29/2025	Clayton County, GA	Clayton County Chairwoman Dr. Alieka Anderson-Henry	Joint Proclamation.
12/29/2025	Morrow, GA	Mayor John Lampl	Joint Proclamation.
12/29/2025	Lovejoy, GA	Mayor Marci Fluellyn	Joint Proclamation.
12/29/2025	Riverdale, GA	Mayor Evelyn Wynn-Dixon	Joint Proclamation.
12/29/2025	Forest Park, GA	Mayor Angelyne Butler	Joint Proclamation.
12/29/2025	Jonesboro, GA	Mayor Donya Sartor	Joint Proclamation.
12/29/2025	Lake City, GA	Mayor Ronald Dodson	Joint Proclamation.
12/29/2025	College Park, GA	Mayor Bianca Motley Broom	Joint Proclamation.
12/30/2025	Georgia	US Representative Hank Johnson	House Resolution.
12/30/2025	Decatur, GA	Mayor Patti Garrett	Proclamation of Day of Peace.
12/31/2025	Gwinnett County, GA	Gwinnett County Board of Commissioners Chairwoman Nicole Love Hendrickson	Proclamation.
12/31/2025	Gwinnett County, GA	Gwinnett County Board of Commissioners Chairwoman Nicole Love Hendrickson	Keys to the county, presented to Phra Ajarn Maha Dam Phommasan.
1/10/2026	Columbia, SC	Mayor Daniel Rickenmann	Proclamation of Walk for Peace Day.
1/10/2026	South Carolina	State Senator Deon Tedder	Proclamation of Walk for Peace Day.
1/11/2026	Fairfield County, SC	Chairman of the Fairfield County Council Clarence Gilbert	Commemorative plaque.
1/11/2026	Ridgeway, SC	Mayor Rick Johnson	Proclamation of Appreciation and Support.
1/11/2026	Blythewood, SC	Mayor Sloan J. Griffin III	Commemorative plaque.
1/12/2026	Great Falls, SC	Mayor Keevi Worthy	Certificate of Recognition.
1/10-15/2026	Charlotte, NC	Councilwoman Dimple Ajmera	Proclamation of Walk for Peace Week.
1/18/2026	Thomasville, NC	Mayor Pro Tempore JacQuez Johnson	Proclamation.
1/19/2026	High Point, NC	Mayor Cyril Jefferson	Proclamation.
1/19/2026	Greensboro, NC	Mayor Marikay Abuzuaiter	Proclamation of Walk for Peace Day.
1/21/2026	Siler City, NC	Mayor Donald A. Matthews	Proclamation.
1/22/2026	Pittsboro, NC	Mayor Kyle Shipp	Proclamation of Walk for Peace Day.
1/23/2026	Apex, NC	Mayor Jacques K. Gilbert	Proclamation of Walk for Peace Day.
1/23/2026	County of Wake, NC	Sheriff Willie L. Rowe	Sheriff's commendation.
1/24/2026	Raleigh, NC	Mayor Janet Cowell	Proclamation of Walk for Peace Day.
1/24/2026	North Carolina	Governor Josh Stein	Proclamation of Walk for Peace Day.
2/2/2026	Virginia	State Delegate Irene Shin	House Resolution.
2/2/2026	Virginia	State Senator Jennifer Boysko	Senate Resolution.
2/2/2026	Richmond, VA	Mayor Danny Avula	Proclamation.
2/2/2026	Virginia	Governor Abigail Spanberger	Proclamation of Walk for Peace Day.
2/3/2026	Henrico County, VA	Board of Supervisors Chair Roscoe D. Cooper III	Proclamation.
2/6/2026	Stafford County, VA	Chairman of the Stafford County Board of Supervisors Deuntay Diggs	Proclamation of Walk for Peace Day.
2/7/2026	Dumfries, VA	Mayor Derrick R. Wood	Proclamation of Walk for Peace.
2/9/2026	Alexandria, VA	Mayor Alyia Gaskins	Proclamation.
2/9/2026	Arlington County, VA	Chair of the Arlington County Board Matt De Ferranti	Keys to the county.
2/10/2026	Washington, D.C.	Secretary of the District of Columbia Kimberly A. Bassett	Proclamation.
2/11/2026	New York	Assemblymember Edward L. Gibbs	Assembly Resolution recognizing Walk for Peace Day.
2/12/2026	Maryland	President of the Senate Bill Ferguson	Senate Resolution.
2/12/2026	Maryland	Speaker of the House Joseline Peña-Melnyk	House Resolution.
2/12/2026	Montgomery County, MD	Faith Community Liaison Kate Chance	Certificate of Recognition and Appreciation.
2/12/2026	Annapolis, MD	Mayor Jared Littman	Proclamation of Walk for Peace Day.
2/12/2026	Anne Arundel County, MD	Anne Arundel County Executive Steuart Pittman	Proclamation of Walk for Peace Day.
2/12/2026	Maryland	Lieutenant Governor Aruna Miller	Proclamation of Walk for Peace Day.
2/14/2026	Fort Worth, TX	City Council Member Deborah Peoples	Proclamation.
2/23/2026	Utah	State Senator Luz Escamilla	Citation recognizing Venerable Douangphaneth Mingsisouphanh and Venerable Vilasak Chaleunsouk.

== Aloka the Peace Dog ==
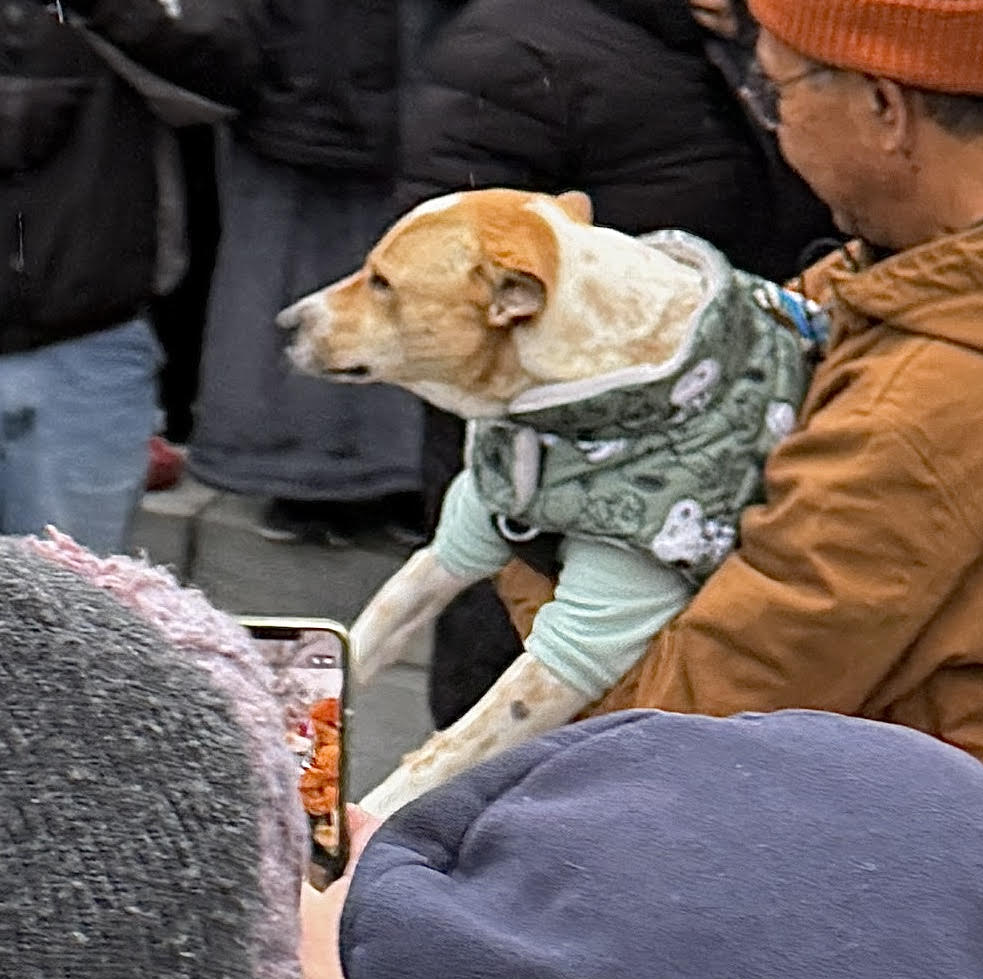
Aloka in front of a crowd in Raleigh, North Carolina

A key figure in the Walk for Peace is Aloka, a stray dog from India, who joined a prior peace walk in India and later became part of the U.S. pilgrimage. He is often seen walking ahead of the group or resting alongside them and has developed a significant following on social media.

A post from the Walk for Peace's official Facebook page announced that Aloka would undergo veterinary surgery at the Charleston Veterinary Referral Center (CVRC) free of charge for a chronic leg issue on January 12, 2026. A problem with his cranial cruciate ligament (CCL), described as common in dogs, required a tibial plateau-leveling osteotomy (TPLO). He will be having restricted mobility as part of a gradual recovery process, and would be back in "two or three days" to continue the walk with brief stretches.

== Gallery ==
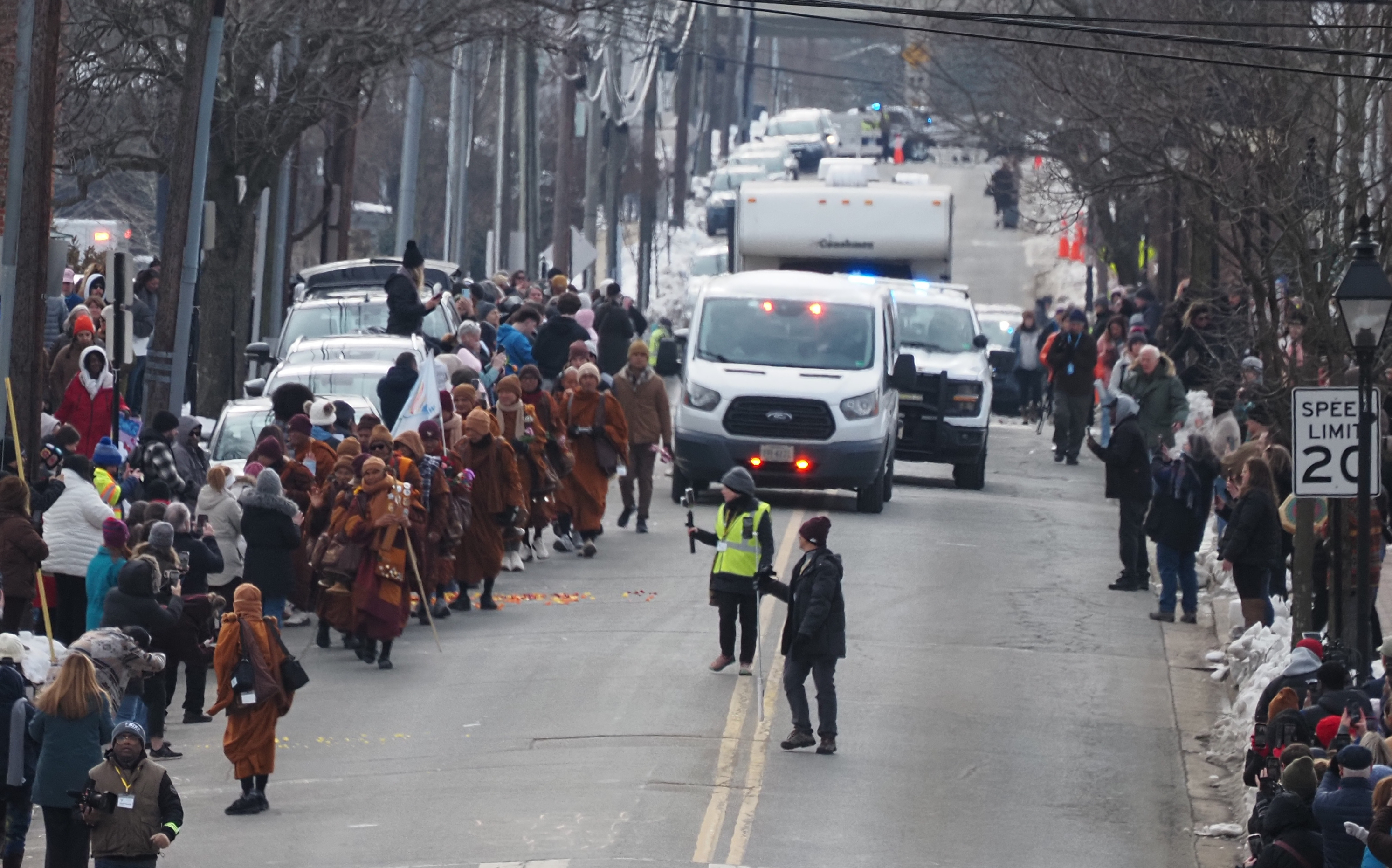
Fredericksburg, Virginia

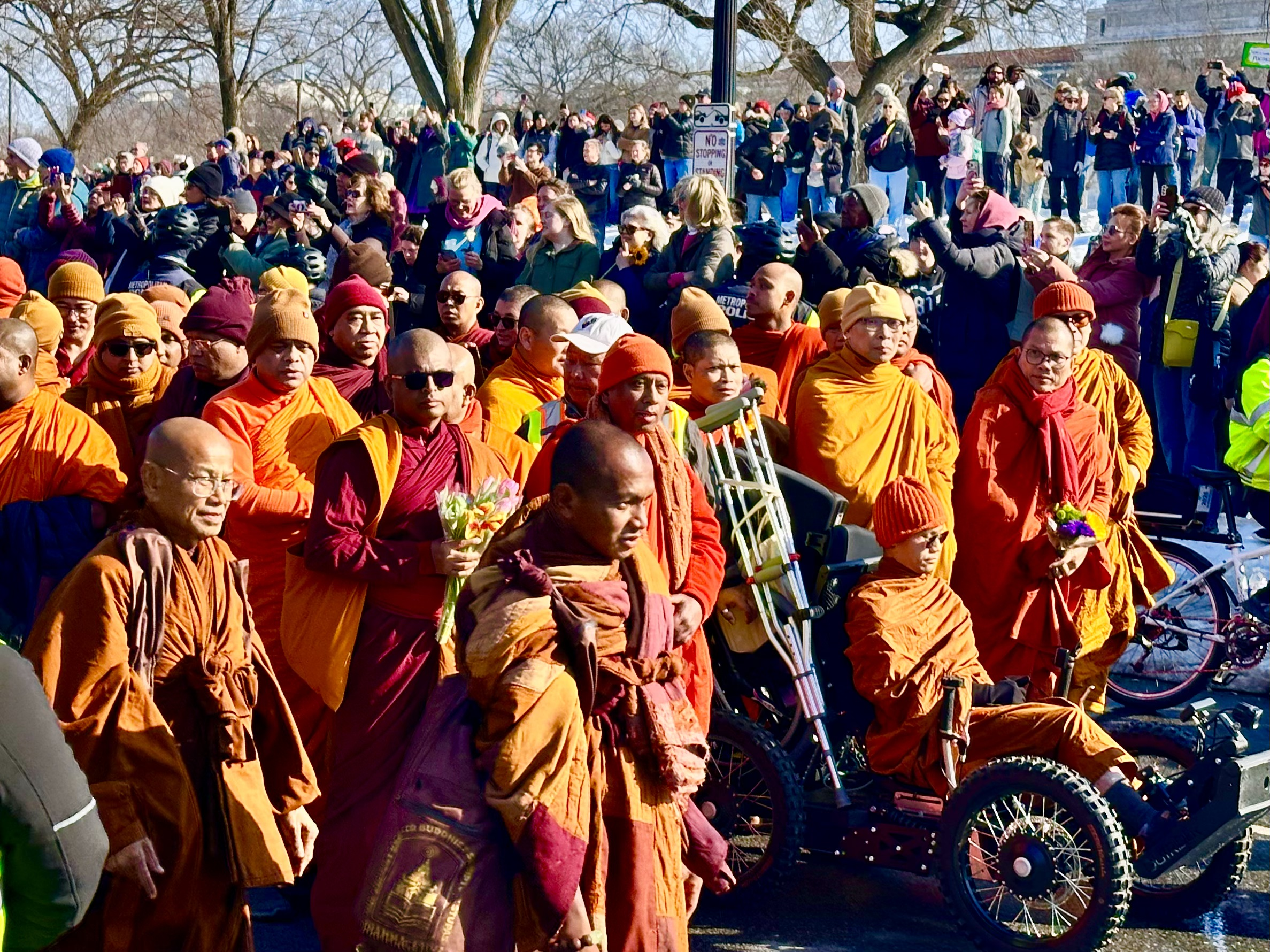
Washington, D.C.

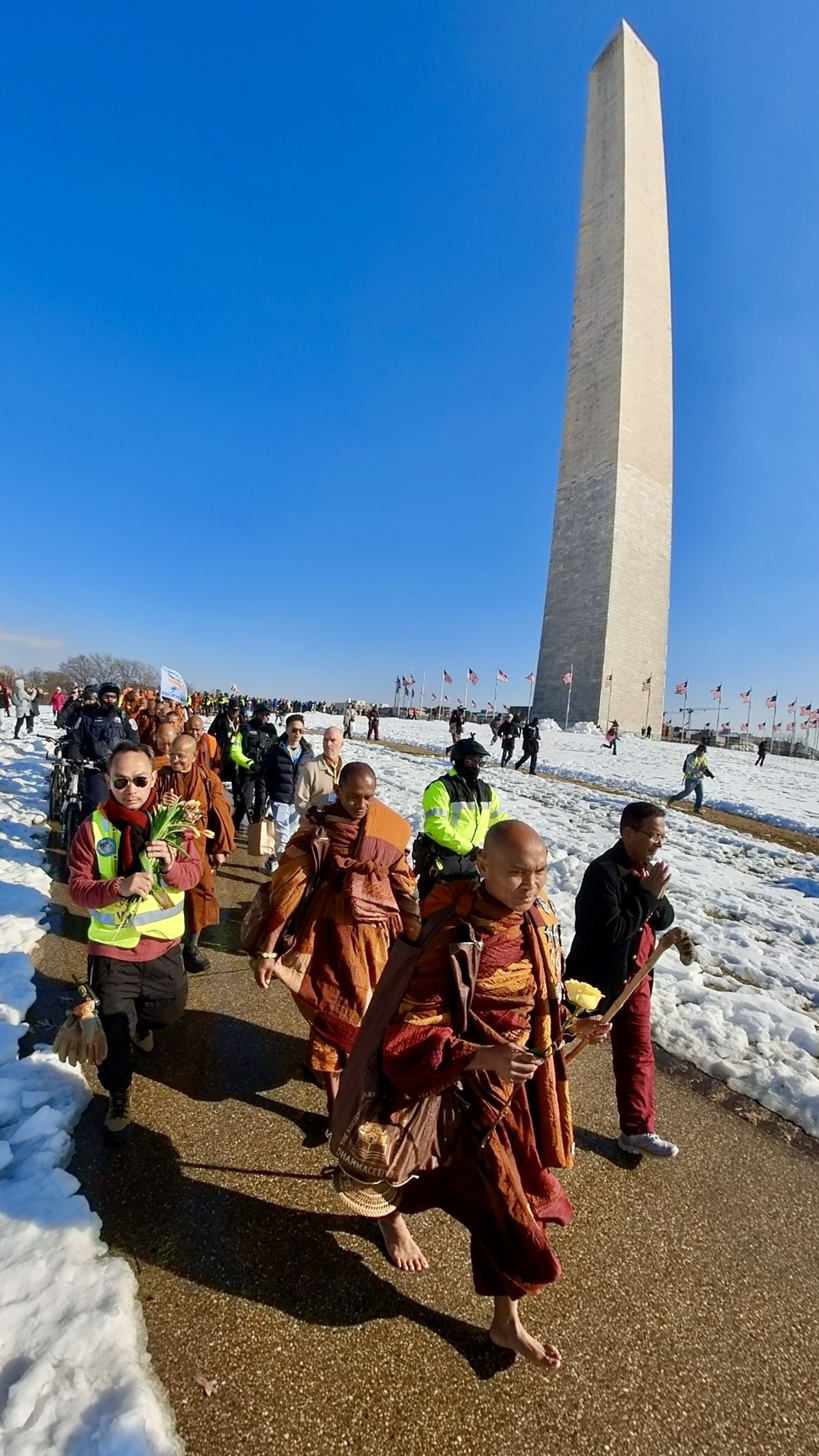
Venerable Bhikkhu Paññākāra walking by the Washington Monument

== Walk locations ==
Day	Date	Destination	Notes
1	10/26/2025	Burleson, TX	Kickoff ceremony at Hương Đạo Vipassana Bhavana Center. Lunch in Fort Worth, Texas.
2	10/27/2025	Grandview, TX	Lunch in Alvarado, Texas.
3	10/28/2025	Hillsboro, TX	Lunch in Itasca, Texas.
4	10/29/2025	West, TX	
5	10/30/2025	Robinson, TX	Prayer ceremony at Veterans Memorial Park in Lacy Lakeview, Texas.
6	10/31/2025	Troy, TX	Lunch Stop: McBrayer Park in Lorena, Texas.
7	11/1/2025	Belton, TX	Lunch in Temple, Texas.
8	11/2/2025	Georgetown, TX	Lunch in Salado, Texas.
9	11/3/2025	Austin, TX	
10	11/4/2025	Austin, TX	Full Moon recitation of the Patimokkha at 5:00 PM.
11	11/5/2025	Austin, TX	Ceremony at the Texas State Capitol.
12	11/6/2025	Elgin, TX	Lunch in Manor, Texas.
13	11/7/2025	Paige, TX	
14	11/8/2025	Ledbetter, TX	
15	11/9/2025	Carmine, TX	
16	11/10/2025	Bellville, TX	
17	11/11/2025	Brookshire, TX	
18	11/12/2025	Katy, TX	
19	11/13/2025	Houston, TX	
20	11/14/2025	Houston, TX	Welcome ceremony at Hong Kong City Mall in Houston, TX with Texas state representatives and Houston city officials. Overnight Rest: Watpa Buddhayan Meditation Center in Sugar Land, Texas.
21	11/15/2025	Houston, TX	Overnight Rest: Phap Luan Buddhist Culture Center.
22	11/16/2025	Houston, TX	Overnight Rest: Chùa Hương Lâm in Pearland, Texas.
23	11/17/2025	Houston, TX	Overnight Rest: Nieto Park.
24	11/18/2025	Houston, TX	Lunch Stop: Wat Phouthasamakhy Lao.
25	11/19/2025		Vehicle accident results in two Peace Walk participants being injured, including Maha Dam Phommasan, near Dayton, Texas.
26	11/20/2025		Walk is paused.
27	11/21/2025	Dayton, TX	Walk resumes the next day.
28	11/22/2025	Hardin, TX	Lunch in Liberty, Texas.
29	11/23/2025	Saratoga, TX	Lunch in Batson, Texas.
30	11/24/2025	Kountze, TX	
31	11/25/2025	Buna, TX	
32	11/26/2025	Trout Creek, TX	
33	11/27/2025	Merryville, LA	
34	11/28/2025	Anacoco Lake	
35	11/29/2025		Lunch in Leesville, Louisiana
36	11/30/2025	Clifton, LA	
37	12/1/2025	Alexandria, LA	
38	12/2/2025	Pineville, LA	Peace Gathering in Pineville, LA.
39	12/3/2025	Archie, LA	Due to the severe trauma to his left leg, Venerable Phra Ajarnh Maha Dam Phommasan successfully underwent a surgical amputation of his left leg.
40	12/4/2025	Frogmore, LA	Lunch in Jonesville, Louisiana.
41	12/5/2025	Natchez, MS	
42	12/6/2025	Fayette, MS	
43	12/7/2025	Port Gibson, MS	
44	12/8/2025	Lower Choctaw Boundary	Lunch Stop: Owens Creek Waterfall.
45	12/9/2025	Raymond, MS	
46	12/10/2025	Pearl, MS	Peace Gathering at the Mississippi State Capitol in Jackson, Mississippi.
47	12/11/2025	Pelahatchie, MS	
48	12/12/2025	Forest, MS	
49	12/13/2025	Newton, MS	Overnight Rest: Mississippi Veterans Memorial Cemetery.
50	12/14/2025	Meridian, MS	Overnight Rest: Jimmie Rodgers Museum.
51	12/15/2025	Cuba, AL	Overnight Rest: Campground of Holiness Tabernacle.
52	12/16/2025	Demopolis, AL	Lunch Stop: Fourth Creek Methodist Church.
53	12/17/2025	Gallion, AL	Lunch Stop: Demopolis Fire Department. Overnight Rest: Bethlehem Church.
54	12/18/2025	Marion Junction, AL	
55	12/19/2025	Selma, AL	Crossed the Edmund Pettus Bridge, offering chants and prayers in remembrance of Bloody Sunday (1965). Stopped at Edgewood Elementary School.
56	12/20/2025	Hayneville, AL	Lunch Stop: Mount Sinai Church.
57	12/21/2025	Montgomery, AL	Lunch Stop: Hopewell Missionary Baptist Church, Lowndesboro, Alabama. Overnight Rest: Burkville United Methodist Church.
58	12/22/2025	Montgomery, AL	Lunch Stop: Metropolitan United Methodist Church Overnight Rest: Alabama Union Station.
59	12/23/2025	Montgomery, AL	Prayer Offering for Healing at the National Memorial for Peace and Justice. Peace Gathering at the steps of Montgomery City Hall. Group photo at the Alabama State Capitol.
60	12/24/2025	Tuskegee, AL	Lunch in Shorter, Alabama.
61	12/25/2025	Opelika, AL	Christmas night at Foundry Opelika Church.
62	12/26/2025	West Point, GA	Lunch Stop: Collins Farms, Cusseta, Alabama.
63	12/27/2025	Hogansville, GA	Lunch Stop: Western Heights Baptist Church, LaGrange, Georgia.
64	12/28/2025	Sharpsburg, GA	Lunch in Moreland, Georgia.
65	12/29/2025	Morrow, GA	Welcomed by Mayor Kim Learnard and State Representative Josh Bonner at the Peachtree City, GA City Hall. Lunch at Trilith Live in Fayetteville, Georgia.
66	12/30/2025	Scottsdale, GA	Lunch and Peace Gathering in Decatur, Georgia.
67	12/31/2025	Snellville, GA	Lunch in Stone Mountain, Georgia. Overnight Rest: Wat Lao Buddha Khanti. Reunited with Maha Dam Phommasan after the loss of his leg in the November 19, 2025 car accident.
68	1/1/2026	Loganville, GA	
69	1/2/2026	Good Hope, GA	Lunch in Monroe, Georgia. Monks gave a blessing at a local wedding and were met by Christian protesters that evening.
70	1/3/2026	Arnoldsville, GA	Lunch in Bishop, Georgia.
71	1/4/2026	Lexington, GA	Travel through Crawford and lunch in Lexington.
72	1/5/2026	Tignall, GA	Lunch in Tignall, Georgia.
73	1/6/2026	McCormick, SC	Lunch in Lincolnton, Georgia.
74	1/7/2026	Edgefield, SC	Lunch Stop: Liberty Hill Lookout, no evening visiting hours.
75	1/8/2026	Leesville, SC	Lunch in Saluda, South Carolina.
76	1/9/2026	Lexington, SC	Lunch Stop: Gilbert, South Carolina. Rest day for Aloka, who rode along in an escort car.
77	1/10/2026	Columbia, SC	Peace Gathering at the South Carolina State House. Overnight Rest: Lutheran Theological Southern Seminary.
78	1/11/2026	Ridgeway, SC	Lunch in Blythewood, South Carolina.
79	1/12/2026	Great Falls, SC	Aloka the Peace Dog undergoes veterinary surgery at the Charleston Veterinary Referral Center for a knee/leg injury.
80	1/13/2026	Rock Hill, SC	
81	1/14/2026	Charlotte, NC	Lunch in Fort Mill, South Carolina.
82	1/15/2026	Concord, NC	Overnight Rest: zMAX Dragway.
83	1/16/2026	China Grove, NC	
84	1/17/2026	Linwood, NC	Lunch Stop: North Carolina Transportation Museum.
85	1/18/2026	Thomasville, NC	
86	1/19/2026	Greensboro, NC	Lunch Stop: Truist Point Stadium in High Point, North Carolina.
87	1/20/2026	Climax, NC	
88	1/21/2026	Siler City, NC	Lunch Stop: Liberty Fire Department Overnight Rest: Jordan-Matthews High School in Siler City.
89	1/22/2026	Pittsboro, NC	Aloka the Peace Dog is reunited with the venerable monks and the Aloka the Peace Dog Facebook page received the blue verification badge. Lunch Stop: Chatham County Government Office Building. Overnight Rest: Chatham County Agricultural & Industrial Fair Association.
90	1/23/2026	Apex, NC	Lunch Stop: Jordan Lake State Recreation Area. Overnight Rest: Apex High School.
91	1/24/2026	Raleigh, NC	Lunch Stop: Greg Poole Jr. All Faiths Chapel (Dix Park). Peace Gathering at the North Carolina State Capitol.
92	1/25/2026	Wake Forest, NC	Lunch Stop: Phật Tích Vạn Hạnh, Van-Hanh Pagoda-NC Buddhist in Raleigh, NC. Overnight Rest: New Life Church in Wake Forest, destination originally estimated to be Rolesville, NC.
93	1/26/2026	Louisburg, NC	Lunch Stop: Triangle North Executive Airport. Lunch and Overnight Rest Stops not open to the public due to inclement weather.
94	1/27/2026	Warrenton, NC	Lunch and Overnight stops not open to the public due to inclement weather.
95	1/28/2026	Gasburg, VA	Overnight Rest: Pleasant Hill Christian Church
96	1/29/2026	Alberta, VA	Lunch Stop: Brunswick Byways Visitor Center Overnight Rest: Bethel United Methodist Church
97	1/30/2026	DeWitt, VA	Overnight Rest: Mt Calvary Baptist Church
98	1/31/2026	Petersburg, VA	Overnight Rest: Virginia State University.
99	2/1/2026	Richmond, VA	Lunch Stop: SpringHill Suites by Marriott Chester Overnight Rest: Kingsland Baptist Church.
100	2/2/2026	Richmond, VA	Peace Gathering at the Richmond City Hall and the Virginia Union University.
101	2/3/2026	Ashland, VA	Lunch Stop: Virginia Randolph Education Center Overnight Rest: Randolph–Macon College
102	2/4/2026	Ruther Glen, VA	Lunch Stop: Saint Tikhon Orthodox Church Overnight Rest: Wright's Chapel United Methodist Church
103	2/5/2026	Fredericksburg, VA	Overnight Rest: Lee Hill 1 Building in Spotsylvania County
104	2/6/2026	Stafford, VA	Lunch Stop: Unitarian Universalist Fellowship of Fredericksburg Overnight Rest: Stafford County Government Center
105	2/7/2026	Woodbridge, VA	Overnight Rest: Hilton Garden Inn Woodbridge.
106	2/8/2026	Alexandria, VA	Overnight Rest: Mount Vernon Presbyterian Church.
107	2/9/2026	Arlington, VA	Lunch Stop: Christ Church Alexandria. Sư Chánh Đạo (Venerable Samma Maggo, aka Two-Step) and Venerable Maha Dam Phommasan rejoined the monks. Overnight Rest: Marymount University.
108	2/10/2026	Washington, D.C.	Almost 3,500 people greeted them at American University's Bender Arena. Lunch Stop: National United Methodist Church. Over 100 additional Buddhist monks and nuns joined them at the Washington National Cathedral. The walk continued along Embassy Row, ending at George Washington University.
109	2/11/2026	Washington, D.C.	Visited the St. Mark's Episcopal Church, the Lincoln Memorial, and the Charles E. Smith Center.
110	2/12/2026	Annapolis, MD	Continued by bus to the Navy–Marine Corps Memorial Stadium in Annapolis, MD. Peace Gathering at the steps of the Maryland State House. Private lunch hosted by Governor Wes Moore and First Lady Dawn Moore at the Government House. Departed by bus for Fort Worth, TX.
111	2/13/2026		Peace Gathering at Legacy Church in Wytheville, VA. Lunch Stop: Morristown Landing in Morristown, TN.
112	2/14/2026	Fort Worth, TX	Homecoming Walk in Downtown Fort Worth, TX - approximately 1.2 miles (1.9 km) to Hương Đạo Vipassana Bhavana Center - the Walk for Peace starting point. Homecoming Ceremony at Hương Đạo Vipassana Bhavana Center.

== See also ==
- Buddhism in the United States
- List of American Buddhists
- Dhammayietra
- Walk for Peace in Sri Lanka
- Media related to Walk for Peace at Wikimedia Commons
