= Triple tibial osteotomy =

The triple tibial osteotomy is a surgical procedure used to treat dogs that have completely or partially ruptured the cranial cruciate ligament in one or both of their stifles. The cranial cruciate ligament connects the femur with the tibia, which functions to stabilise the canine stifle joint from the forces put on it during exercise and weight bearing. The triple tibial osteotomy was developed by a New Zealand veterinary orthopaedic specialist, Dr. Warrick Bruce, while he was working in Adelaide, South Australia.

== Stifle joint in dog ==
The stifle joint relies solely upon soft tissue structures for its integrity; thus it differs from an elbow or a hip joint that have a lot of parallel joint surfaces and an interlocking structure to the joints that give them inherent stability and an almost vacuum effect that keeps the joint surfaces together.

Along with the cranial cruciate ligament, the other soft tissue structures stabilising the stifle are the caudal cruciate ligament and the two menisci, all of which are intra-articular (within the joint), and the two collateral ligaments (external to the joint). Muscle tone through the quadriceps, hamstring and calf muscles play a significant role in the forces acting on the joint.

== Cranial cruciate ligament ==
The cranial cruciate ligament is composed of two bands, a craniomedial band and a caudolateral band. It functions to stop cranial (anterior) movement of the tibia with respect to the femur, hyperextension of the stifle joint and internal rotation of the tibia. The cranial cruciate ligament is thought to be able to resist a force equivalent to four times the weight of the dog before it ruptures, but often the ligament is weakened by arthritis that is present in the joint. Arthritis infers inflammation of the joint; in this condition there is the production of a joint fluid that is less viscous and therefore less able to absorb shock than normal fluid. Joint fluid's other role is to provide nutrition to the cartilage and the cruciate ligaments. The situation is a little like a chicken-and-egg scenario: it is usually accepted that the cranial cruciate ligament ruptures because arthritis has caused the ligament to weaken because of poor joint fluid characteristics, but what causes the arthritis in the first place – a partial cruciate tear?

The situation is dissimilar to that seen in human athletes where overextension of the joint stretches the cranial cruciate ligament to failure, and replacement of the ligament with a fascial prosthesis has a good prognosis for return to full function.

== Menisci ==
The menisci are the other intra-articular structures that help to stabilise the joint and help to distribute load evenly across the surfaces; these are crescent-shaped discs of cartilage facing each other from side to side across the joint. They are thicker at the outside and with a thin inner aspect and they also have nerve fibres that help to tell the brain how much load is getting transmitted through the joint. The medial (inside) meniscus is often damaged with a long-standing cruciate ligament rupture because it is firmly attached to the tibia and gets crushed during abnormal cranial movement of the tibia. The lateral (outside) meniscus is more firmly attached to the femur and does not get crushed.

== Surgical rationale ==
By changing the geometry of the forces of gravity and muscle contractions that act on the stifle during weight-bearing, it aims to neutralise the shear force that causes the cranial movement of the tibia with respect to the femur.

This shear force develops because the canine tibial plateau – the weight-bearing aspect of the joint – is sloped caudally (downwards towards the back of the joint) and there is an acute angle between the tibial plateau slope and the patellar ligament. In the triple tibial osteotomy procedure, the tibia has three osteotomies (cuts into the bone with a bone saw) performed upon it with the aim of realigning the tibial plateau slope so that it ultimately becomes aligned at right angles to the patellar ligament instead of sloping backwards. By achieving this, shear forces within the joint are neutralised and the joint is stable as the dog weight-bears.

The joint is not stable, however, when it is physically manipulated by attempting to move the tibia cranially. This contrasts with previous methods of cranial cruciate ligament repair which aimed to provide stability to the joint by replacing the ligament either with a fascial graft within the joint, or using a prosthesis made of nylon placed externally from the lateral fabella to a hole drilled in the tibial crest.

The triple tibial osteotomy has been developed as a hybrid of two previously available orthopaedic procedures, the tibial tuberosity advancement and the tibial plateau leveling osteotomy. The tibial tuberosity advancement neutralises shear force within the stifle by advancing the tibial tuberosity until the tibial plateau is at right angles to the patellar ligament. The tibial plateau leveling osteotomy neutralises shear force by rotating the tibial plateau so that it is approximately horizontal with respect to the long axis of the tibia. The triple tibial osteotomy combines both of these procedures and as such less radical changes than either are required.

== Surgical technique ==
The triple tibial osteotomy involves removing a horizontal small wedge of bone (average 16 degrees) halfway along a vertical osteotomy in the tibial tuberosity. Firstly by removing the wedge of bone, the tibial plateau is levelled. Secondly as the horizontal defect created by removing the wedge is closed down, the tibial tuberosity is itself advanced by several millimetres. This compares with an average of 20 degrees plateau levelling required for the tibial plateau leveling osteotomy and 9-12mm of tibial tuberosity advancement with the tibial tuberosity advancement.

Return to normal function is rapid, with most dogs having good use of the leg and a normal appearing gait within 3–4 months; long-term progression of arthritis is minimal.

== Alternative procedures ==
- Tibial-plateau-leveling osteotomy
- Tibial tuberosity advancement
- Tightrope CCL
- Simitri Stable in Stride
- Cranial tibial wedge osteotomy
