= Simitri Stable in Stride =

Simitri Stable in Stride is a three part modular surgical implant used during surgery performed on dogs to stabilize the stifle joint (knee) after rupture of the cranial cruciate ligament (CrCL) which is analogous to the anterior cruciate ligament (ACL) in humans.

The canine cranial cruciate ligament performs two main functions: it limits cranial tibial translation (forward movement of the tibia [shin] relative to the femur [thigh]) and internal tibial rotation (inward twisting of the shin relative to the femur). As the CrCL tears, the ability to provide translational and rotational stability is lost. As a result, the knee becomes progressively unstable causing pain, lameness, loss of range of motion and progressive degenerative joint disease (also known as arthritis).

The cause of the CrCL tearing is multifactorial (having many causes) and we don't yet have a clear picture as to why it occurs. Obesity, conformation, inflammatory conditions of the joint and genetics are all included under the multifactorial umbrella. Genetic factors are undoubtedly important, which would help explain why certain breeds are predisposed, including Labrador and Golden Retrievers, Mastiffs, Rottweilers, Boxers, Staffordshire Terriers, West Highland White Terriers and Newfoundland dogs.

In a Simitri Stable in Stride surgical procedure, unlike tibial-plateau-leveling osteotomy (TPLO) and tibial tuberosity advancement (TTA), no osteotomy (cutting of bone) is required making this a much less invasive procedure. A surgical incision is made on the inside of the affected leg and the Simitri implant is positioned over the center of the stifle (knee) joint. All components of the implant remain under the skin but outside the knee Joint. The architecture of the affected joint is unchanged and the biomechanics are not significantly altered. The implant is fixed in place with six cortical locking screws and once implanted provides immediate and continuous translational and rotational stability throughout the entire range of motion. Dogs are almost always able to weight bear on their surgical leg within 24 hours and are expected to begin a comprehensive rehabilitation program, including controlled leash walks the day they go home.

Lameness scores and stifle range of motion improve improve rapidly and significantly. Most dogs are expected to recover within four months of surgery.

== Alternative procedures ==
- Tibial-plateau-leveling osteotomy
- Tibial tuberosity advancement
- Tightrope CCL
- Triple tibial osteotomy
