= Walk for Peace in Sri Lanka =

2026 Buddhist pilgrimage across Sri Lanka promoting peace

A Global Walk for Peace in the Island of Peace – Sri Lanka
- Part of Walk for Peace
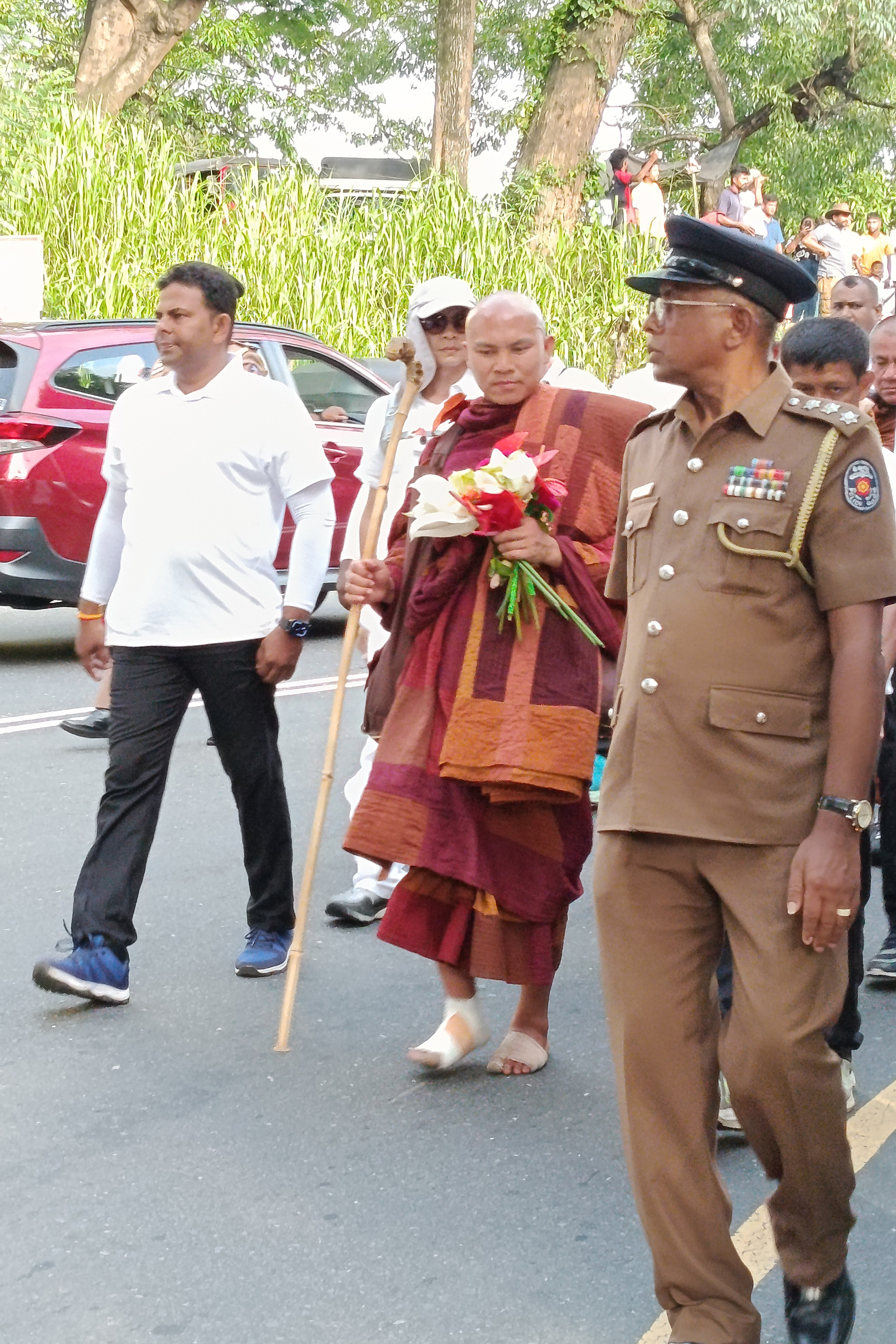
- Bhikkhu Pannakara leading the walk near Kandy
- Native name: සාම පාද යාත්‍රාව
- Date: 21–28 April 2026
- Venue: Public roads and communities
- Location: Sri Lanka
- Also known as: Ehipassiko Peace Walk
- Type: Peace walk; Buddhist pilgrimage
- Theme: Peace, Compassion, Nonviolence, Mindfulness
- Cause: Promotion of peace and interfaith dialogue
- Motive: Advocacy for nonviolence and compassion
- Target: General public
- Organised by: Walk for Peace
- Participants: Buddhist monks, volunteers, supporters
- Route: Anuradhapura; Dambulla; Matale; Kandy; Beligammana; Tholangamuwa; Yakkala; Kelaniya; Colombo
- Website: walkforpeace.gov.lk

A Global Walk for Peace in the Island of Peace – Sri Lanka, also known as Ehipassiko Peace Walk because of its theme of Ehipassiko (Come and See), commonly known as Walk for Peace in Sri Lanka, was a seven-day Buddhist pilgrimage and peace march held in Sri Lanka from 21 to 28 April 2026. The event was led by the Most Venerable Bhikkhu Pannakara, a Theravada monk from the Hương Đạo Vipassana Bhavana Center in Texas, United States.

The walk aimed to promote peace, mindfulness, and loving-kindness (metta) following a similar 108-day peace march across the United States in early 2026.

== Background ==
The pilgrimage followed the Walk for Peace USA, where Venerable Paññākāra and a group of monks walked from Texas to Washington, D.C. to raise awareness for non-violence. The Sri Lankan leg of the walk was organized to bring this message to the island, highlighting Sri Lanka's Buddhist heritage and promoting social harmony.

== Route ==
The walk spanned approximately seven days, starting in the ancient city of Anuradhapura and ending in the commercial capital, Colombo.

The walk commenced on 21 April 2026, as a seven-day Buddhist pilgrimage and spiritual march led by the Most Venerable Bhikkhu Pannakara and a delegation of twelve monks. The first day of the program was centered in the historic city of Anuradhapura, where it began with a ceremonial gathering to receive blessings in front of the sacred Jaya Sri Maha Bodhi. A key event of the day included the ceremonial handover of a sacred Bodhi sapling and the display of venerated Buddhist relics, including those from the Nilagiri Cetiya, which were carried by the procession as symbols of peace and unity. Following these rituals, special religious observances and an "As Disa Pooja" were held at the Ruwanweliseya premises at 5:00 PM to convey a message of compassion and mindfulness to the public.

Date	Destination	Travelled distance	Notes
22 April	Matale	47km	The march commenced from the Golden Temple of Dambulla in Dambulla.
23 April	Kandy	28km	The march resumed from the Aluvihare Rock Temple in Matale. After reaching Kandy, the monks visited the Mahanayaka Theros of the Malwatta and Asgiriya chapters.
24 April	Beligammana	25km	The march resumed from the Temple of the Tooth in Kandy after special blessings. Harini Amarasuriya, the Prime Minister of Sri Lanka, also participated in this event.
25 April	Tholangamuwa	25km	The march resumed from the Beligammana Raja Maha Vihara in Beligammana, Mawanella.
26 April	Yakkala	33km	The walk resumed from Dudley Senanayake Central College in Tholangamuwa.
27 April	Kelaniya	21km	The walk resumed from the Abeysekararamaya Temple in Yakkala.
28 April	Colombo	15km	The walk resumed from the Kelaniya Raja Maha Vihara in Kelaniya. The State ceremony of the Walk for Peace was held at Independence Square, Colombo in the afternoon.

=== The state ceremony ===
The official state ceremony held on 28 April 2026 at Independence Square in Colombo under the patronage of President Anura Kumara Dissanayake. High-ranking government ministers, foreign ambassadors, heads of the security forces, and a multi-religious leaderships were also attended to this event.

During the event, the President Dissanayake formally presented the sacred sapling of the Jaya Sri Maha Bodhi to Ven. Bhikkhu Pannakara and the 12-members of monks.

== Support ==
The pilgrimage received support from several state and private organizations, including:

- The Presidential Secretariat
- The Ministry of Buddhist, Religious and Cultural Affairs
- Sri Lanka Armed Forces and Sri Lanka Police
- The Maharaja Media Network

== See also ==
- Buddhism in Sri Lanka
- Peace walk
- Aragalaya - for historical context of recent social movements in Sri Lanka
