= Aloka (dog) =

Dog that joined a Buddhist Walk for Peace

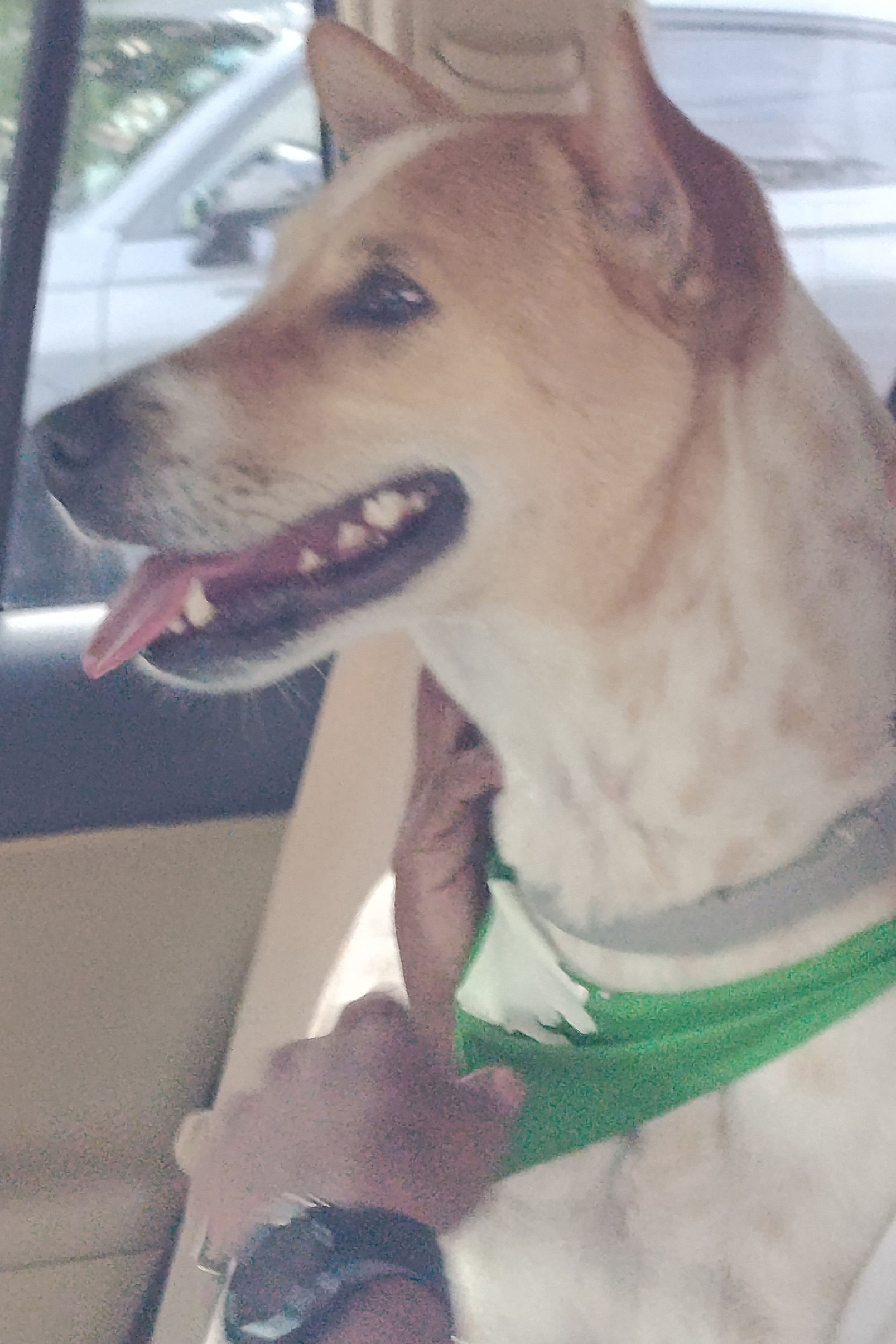
- Aloka, near Kandy, Sri Lanka – April 2026
- Species: Dog (Canis familiaris)
- Breed: Pariah dog
- Sex: Male
- Known for: Accompanying Buddhist monks in the Walk for Peace 2025–2026
- Residence: Fort Worth, Texas
- Appearance: White and brown
- Named after: Āloka (Pali: meaning enlightenment or illumination)

Aloka, widely known as Aloka the Peace Dog, is a male rescue dog who rose to international prominence accompanying a group of Buddhist monks on a Walk for Peace across the United States in 2025 and 2026.

Believed to be an Indian pariah dog, Aloka was originally a stray when he encountered a group of Vietnamese-American Buddhist monks in 2022, participating in a 112-day peace pilgrimage across India. According to the monks, Aloka began following them during their walk and despite suffering several hardships -- including being struck by a car and falling seriously ill -- he repeatedly rejoined the procession. The monks adopted him and brought him back to the United States.

Aloka's wider prominence grew when he joined an initiative called the "Walk for Peace." The event began on October 26, 2025, when approximately 19 Buddhist monks from the Huong Dao Vipassana Bhavana Center in Fort Worth, Texas, set out on a roughly 2,300-mile walk to Washington, D.C. The monks walked barefoot through 10 states over 108 days, advocating for peace, loving-kindness, and compassion, and calling on Congress to recognize Vesak -- the Buddha's birthday -- as a United States federal holiday. Aloka walked alongside them for much of the journey, occasionally riding in a support vehicle.

He has a distinctive heart-shaped marking on his forehead and, at the height of the walk, had accumulated more than 1.5 million followers across his social media accounts.

== Early life and first encounter with the monks ==
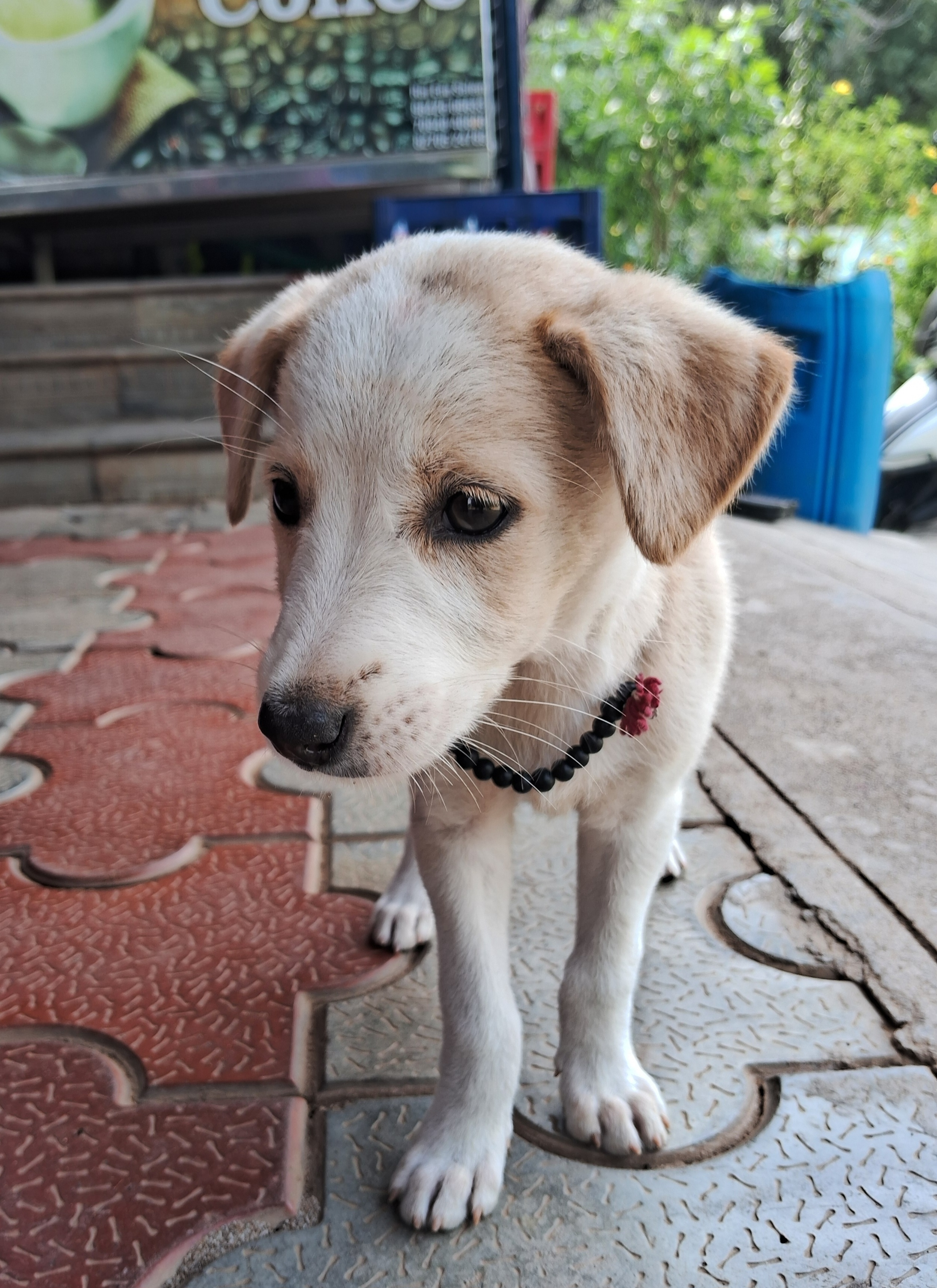
An Indian pariah dog, the breed Aloka is believed to be

Aloka was a stray living on the streets of India when he first crossed paths with Venerable Bhikkhu Pannakara, a Vietnamese-American Buddhist monk and former engineer known for barefoot pilgrimages in South Asia. The Associated Press reported that Aloka, then homeless, began following the monks from Kolkata in eastern India all the way to the Nepal border. At one point during that walk, Aloka fell critically ill and Pannakara carried him and cared for him until he recovered. The monks eventually adopted him and named him Aloka, a word meaning "divine light" in Sanskrit and "enlightenment" or "illumination" in Pali.

== Walk for Peace (2025–2026) ==
The Walk for Peace departed the Huong Dao Vipassana Bhavana Center in Fort Worth on October 26, 2025, led by Venerable Bhikkhu Pannakara. The group -- about 19 monks, accompanied by Aloka and a support vehicle, walked largely in single file, often in silence. Along the route the monks stopped at state capitals, historic landmarks, and local communities to share their message of mindfulness and to invite people into moments of collective reflection. The walk drew growing crowds as it moved east, with supporters lining the road to greet the monks in cities across the South and up the Eastern Seaboard.

The monks practiced and taught Vipassana meditation at stops throughout the journey. Their broader mission included a formal request that Vesak, the most sacred day in the Buddhist calendar, be recognized as a United States federal holiday.

Aloka became an integral part of the walk's identity, appearing daily on the group's social media accounts. He was known for rotating outfits often in red, white, or other bright colors and for the calm, measured pace with which he kept step beside the monks. His wardrobe and the heart-shaped marking on his forehead made him immediately recognizable to followers online.

On February 10, 2026, after 108 days on the road spanning 10 states, the monks crossed the Chain Bridge over the Potomac River into Washington, D.C., completing their 2,300-mile journey. They walked through the city to the steps of the Lincoln Memorial, where Pannakara addressed the crowd on mindfulness and the power of peace. Aloka was at his side for the final steps. The group spent two days in Washington before returning to Fort Worth, arriving home on February 14, 2026.

== Injury and recovery ==
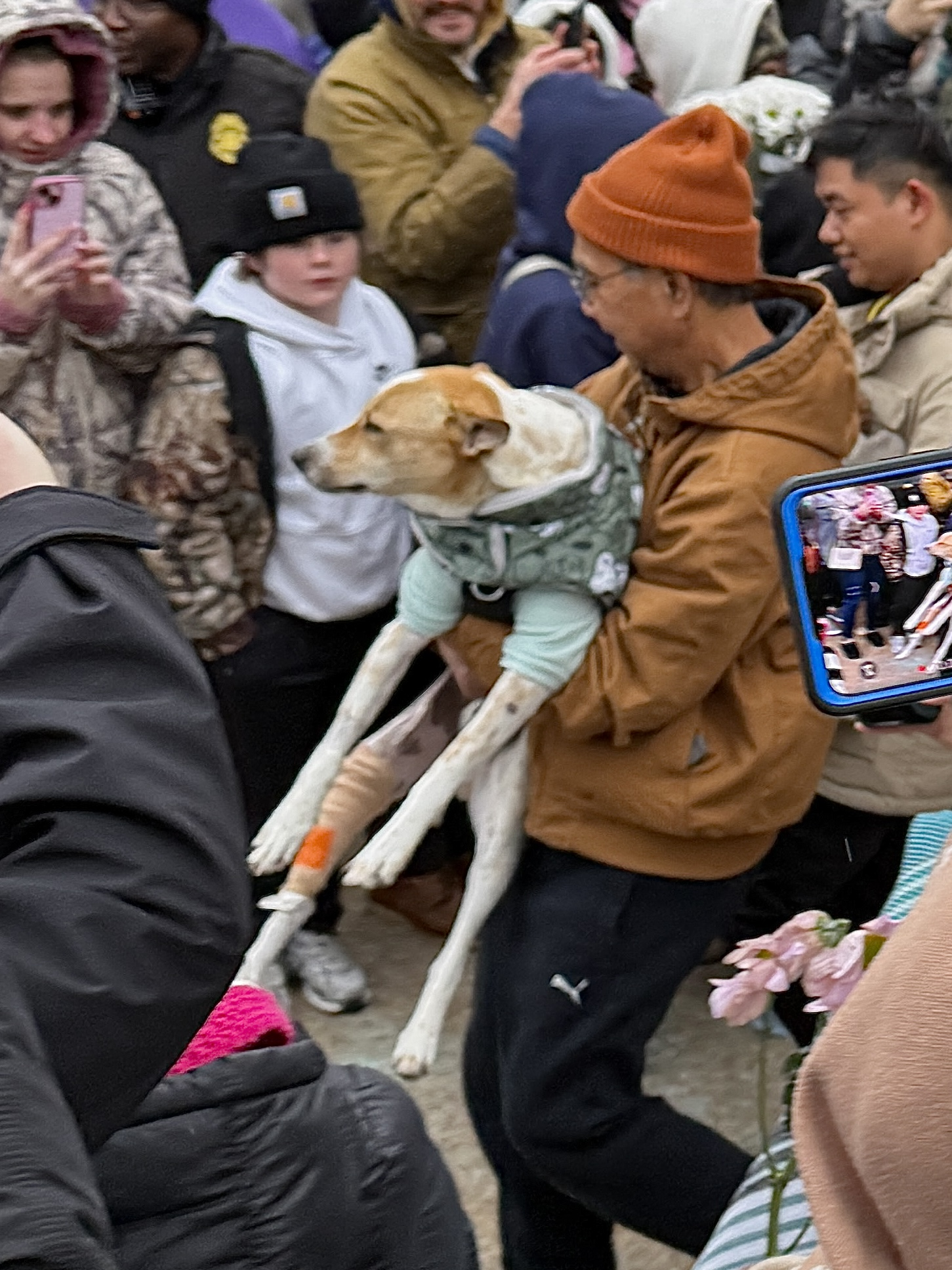
Aloka being carried in front of a crowd, with his injured hind leg visible

In early January 2026, Aloka began visibly limping on his right hind leg while the group was passing through South Carolina. The monks took him first to Lake Murray Animal Hospital and then to Batesburg-Leesville Animal Hospital, before a referral to Charleston Veterinary Referral Center.

On January 12, 2026, veterinary surgeon Dr. Patti Sura -- a graduate of the Virginia-Maryland College of Veterinary Medicine, performed a one-hour operation and diagnosed a torn cranial cruciate ligament (CCL), a condition common in dogs and linked to a chronic right hind limb issue dating back to Aloka's time in India. The procedure was a tibial-plateau-leveling osteotomy (TPLO) and was performed entirely free of charge.

Aloka's recovery plan allowed him to rejoin the walk but limited him to no more than ten minutes of walking at a time, up to six times per day during the first week, with activity gradually increasing thereafter. While Aloka was recovering, the monks passed through Columbia, South Carolina, where they held a public peace talk on the steps of the South Carolina State House.

Dr. Sura turned out to be the first of three graduates of the Virginia-Maryland veterinary college who independently volunteered care for Aloka along the route, none of whom had coordinated with each other in advance. Veterinarians across the entire route offered their services throughout the journey, providing physical therapy, laser therapy, and chiropractic care.

Aloka had a brief reunion with the monks in Charlotte, North Carolina on January 15, 2026, before returning to rehabilitation. He formally rejoined the walk on January 22, 2026, day 89 of the journey, though the official Walk for Peace Facebook page noted he would mostly ride in the support vehicle rather than walk the road until he was fully healed.

As the walk entered its final days in the Washington, D.C. area, Aloka received additional evaluations and cold laser therapy sessions from veterinarians Dr. Cady Johnston and Dr. Tosha Starke of Summit Veterinary Care on February 7, 2026. On February 10, he walked the final steps of the journey into Washington with his handler beside him.

Dinwiddie County Animal Control in Virginia honored Aloka with a special pin as the procession passed through the region. As Aloka received it, a post from the walk's social media described him sitting quietly and appearing proud while remaining close to the monks.

== Arrival in Washington, D.C. ==
On the morning of February 10, 2026, the monks crossed the Chain Bridge from Arlington, Virginia, into Washington, D.C., shortly after 8 a.m. The Metropolitan Police Department issued traffic advisories and rolling road closures along the route to ensure the safety of the monks and onlookers. Large crowds gathered to welcome them as they walked to the Lincoln Memorial, where Pannakara delivered a closing address centered on the transformative potential of mindfulness. "My hope is, when this walk ends, the people we met will continue practicing mindfulness and find peace," he said.

The group also attended an event at Washington National Cathedral and held additional gatherings in the city over two days before returning to Fort Worth. The Walk for Peace's Facebook page had accumulated approximately 1 million followers by the time the walk concluded, with Aloka's own pages drawing hundreds of thousands more.

== After the walk ==
Following the monks' return to Fort Worth on February 14, 2026, plans were announced for Aloka to take on a new role. "Aloka is going to have his own mission from now on," said Venerable Bhikkhu Pannakara. As of May 2026, a charitable foundation bearing Aloka's name was established with the aim of supporting vulnerable animals worldwide, drawing on Aloka's own history as an overlooked street dog.

Aloka's work earned recognition in the Fort Worth Report's "52 Faces of Community" series, which spotlights local figures whose contributions often go unnoticed.

== Walk for Peace in Sri Lanka ==
On April 21, 2026, Venerable Pannakara Thero arrived in Sri Lanka with Aloka at the invitation of President Anura Kumara Dissanayake to participate in a Walk for Peace conducted under full state patronage. As a certified service animal, Aloka was permitted to travel inside the passenger cabin rather than in the cargo hold, with a dedicated seat reserved beside Pannakara for the more than 20-hour flight.

The walk commenced on April 22, 2026, in Dambulla and concluded on April 28, 2026, at Independence Square in Colombo, covering approximately 117 miles (188 km) through Dambulla, Matale, Kandy, and several other towns. The procession carried a sapling from the Jaya Sri Maha Bodhi which was a gift from the Sri Lankan government, to be transported to the United States.

Given concerns about intense heat in Sri Lanka, with unusually high daytime temperatures and humid conditions, special care arrangements included a trailing ambulance and continuous veterinary support along the route. The Sri Lanka Veterinary Association (SLVA) was formally responsible for monitoring Aloka's health and safety throughout the walk.

Aloka's presence in Sri Lanka generated significant public attention and became a catalyst for local conversations about the treatment of stray animals. With an estimated 2.5 million free-roaming dogs in Sri Lanka, animal welfare groups used the occasion to call for the passage of the country's long-stalled Animal Welfare Bill and broader legal protections for domestic, wild, and stray animals. Some observers also noted a cultural dimension to Aloka's reception: drawing on the Kukkura Jataka story from the 550 Jataka tales, a number of Sri Lankans regarded Aloka with particular reverence, viewing him as a Bodhisattva.

A separate controversy arose before the walk began, when rumors spread on social media claiming authorities intended to remove street dogs from the planned route to prevent encounters with Aloka. Animal rights advocates criticized the proposal, and organizers ultimately did not remove the local dogs.

== Brief Trip to India in June, 2026 ==
In June 2026, Aloka briefly returned to India, the country where his journey began in 2022. A meet and greet event was organised on 16 June, 2026 at The Westin Hotel, Gurugram, attended by hundreds of pet enthusiasts who gathered to meet Aloka and the accompanying monks.

After the brief trip to India, Aloka moved back to Texas, USA.
