= Tightrope CCL =

Vterinary orthopedic surgical method

Tightrope CCL is a veterinary orthopedic surgical method developed to provide a minimally invasive procedure for extracapsular stabilization of the canine cranial cruciate ligament-deficient stifle joint. The cranial cruciate ligament (CrCL) stabilizes the dog knee much like the anterior cruciate ligament (ACL) does in humans.

There are several modalities currently being used in the treatment of cranial cruciate ligament (CrCL) deficiency, which is a common and costly problem in dogs and sometimes cats. The Tightrope CCL technique utilizes a very strong suture material called FiberTape and isometric placement of small bone tunnels to provide bone-to-bone fixation while not causing the trauma of cutting through the bone of the tibia like a TPLO - tibial plateau leveling osteotomy or TTA - Tibial tuberosity advancement procedure. The objective of TightRope CCL is to counteract cranial tibial thrust, drawer, and internal rotation while providing optimal joint range of motion.

== Alternative procedures ==
- Tibial-plateau-leveling osteotomy
- Tibial tuberosity advancement
- Triple tibial osteotomy
- Simitri Stable in Stride
