= Acetabuloplasty =

Surgical procedures for treating hip dysplasia in children

Hip dysplasia on the right (left in the image), with a steep acetabulum and absent acetabular rim, and a poorly formed femoral head

Acetabuloplasty are surgical techniques, categorized under pelvic osteotomy, used to treat hip dysplasia (HD) in children. These include several technically similar procedures, such as the Lance, Pemberton, and Dega osteotomies. The Salter osteotomy, while broadly considered part of this group, differs significantly in its approach.

== Overview ==
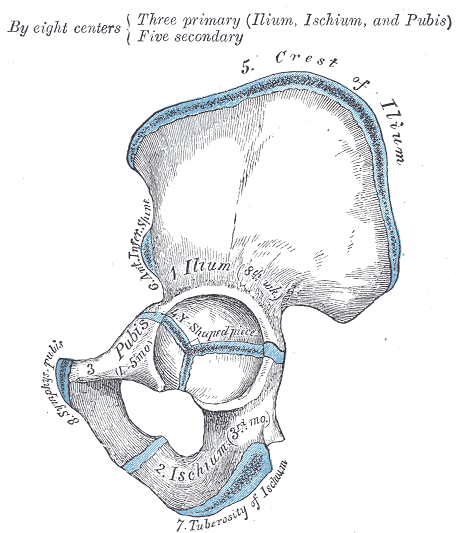
Y-suture

The pelvis, specifically the hip bone, comprises three bones: the ilium, pubis, and ischium. During growth, the junctions between these bones, known as growth plates, remain open. Initially connected by connective tissue, these plates later become flexible through cartilage and ossify only at the end of skeletal growth. The three growth plates converge at the center of the hip joint's acetabulum, forming the Y-suture.

In hip dysplasia, the femoral head lacks sufficient lateral and anterior coverage, known as the acetabular rim. This inadequate coverage can cause the femoral head to slip upward and, depending on the severity, may lead to dislocation of the hip.

Acetabuloplasty leverages the open Y-suture. The ilium is cut above the acetabulum (osteotomy) to allow the lateral acetabular rim to be tilted downward, with the Y-suture serving as the pivot point. This principle underlies all acetabuloplasty techniques, with variations only in their execution.

== Purpose ==
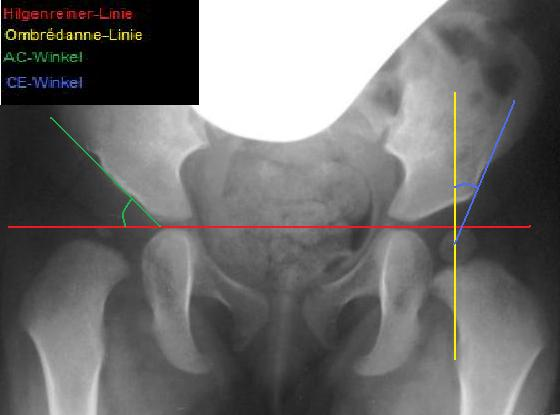
Red=Hilgenreiner line, yellow=Ombrédanne line, green=AC angle (dysplastic side), blue=CE angle (healthy side)

The goal of acetabuloplasty is to restore the lateral and anterior acetabular rim to provide physiological coverage for the femoral head. Early surgery, when indicated, increases the likelihood of normal development of the hip joint and femoral neck.

Lateral coverage is measured using the acetabular angle (AC angle) on a pelvic X-ray, defined as the angle between a horizontal line through the Y-sutures and a line along the acetabular rim. In healthy newborns, the AC angle is approximately 25°, decreasing to about 15° by age 6 and 11–12° by age 12. Acetabuloplasty aims to correct the AC angle to these physiological values, achieving an anatomical reconstruction.

== Indications and contraindications ==
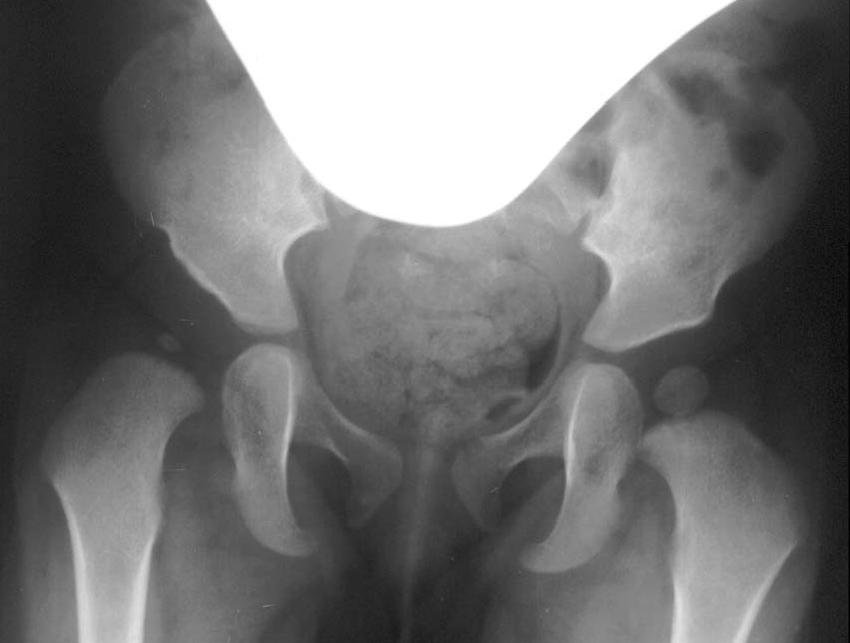
Severe hip dysplasia on the right, with inadequate and overly steep lateral coverage

Acetabuloplasty is primarily indicated for hip dysplasia when conservative treatments—such as abduction braces, splints, or repositioning casts—fail or are insufficient. An absolute indication is a non-reducible hip dislocation. When indicated, surgery should be performed promptly.

The procedure can be performed as early as the first month of life if no medical contraindications exist. However, joint-correcting surgery is typically recommended around 18 months, when bone development and strength allow for precise execution. Due to prior conservative measures, surgery often occurs no earlier than the second year. Mild cases of hip dysplasia may have a favorable prognosis, allowing surgical intervention to be delayed until age 3.

Opinions vary on the upper age limit for acetabuloplasty, but it is viable as long as the Y-suture remains open, typically up to age 12 or 13. For late diagnoses (after 6 months), surgery may be indicated, but conservative measures should still be considered based on findings and severity.

Another indication is Perthes disease, often treated with a Salter osteotomy combined with an intertrochanteric varus osteotomy to better center the femoral head in the acetabulum. Acetabuloplasty is also used in rare neurological conditions, such as cerebral palsy, that cause hip dysplasia or dislocation.

Contraindications include febrile infections, inflammatory processes in the hip joint or pelvic bone, or unresolved general medical conditions. The procedure is not feasible if the Y-suture is closed, skeletal growth is complete, or the femoral head is severely deformed.

== Diagnosis ==
Details on the clinical and imaging diagnosis of hip dysplasia or dislocation are covered in the hip dysplasia article.

Preoperative planning involves conventional pelvic X-rays, including pelvic overview and Rippstein view images, to assess joint misalignment, severity, and surgical planning. Rippstein views provide a lateral projection of the femoral necks.

== Surgical procedure ==
In cases of dysplastic hip dislocation, a functional arthrography of the hip joint(s) may be performed first to assess dislocation behavior and the extent of capsular stretching or injury on X-ray. This step helps determine whether surgery is necessary and which technique to use.

=== Acetabuloplasty technique ===
Acetabuloplasty, Step 1: Osteotomy of the ilium

Acetabuloplasty, Step 2: Tilting the acetabular fragment downward

Acetabuloplasty, Step 3: Insertion of the bone wedge

Acetabuloplasty, Step 4: Optional fixation with a Kirschner wire

All osteotomy techniques require only a small incision between the groin fold and iliac crest. The muscles are bluntly separated to expose the ilium. The periosteum is detached just above the acetabulum, and the iliac bone is laid bare.

==== Pemberton osteotomy ====
In the Pemberton technique, under continuous X-ray guidance, the ilium is notched approximately 5 mm above the acetabular rim using a flat chisel, and the osteotomy is extended toward the Y-shaped physis. The acetabular fragment is then tilted downward and forward under X-ray control to achieve anatomical reconstruction.

==== Dega osteotomy ====
The Dega osteotomy also extends toward the Y-suture but uses specialized curved chisels to achieve a spherical detachment of the fragment, matching the acetabulum's curvature. Originally, Dega tilted the fragment only laterally, but modern practice often includes an anterior tilt, similar to the Pemberton method.

In both techniques, a suitably shaped bone wedge is inserted into the resulting gap under X-ray guidance. If needed, the wedge can be fixed with an osteosynthesis wire (Kirschner wire). The procedure typically takes 45 to 60 minutes for an experienced surgeon.

Post-surgery, a pelvic spica cast (modified Fettweiss cast) or abduction orthosis is applied to keep the femoral head centered in the acetabulum during healing. Anesthesia is discontinued afterward.

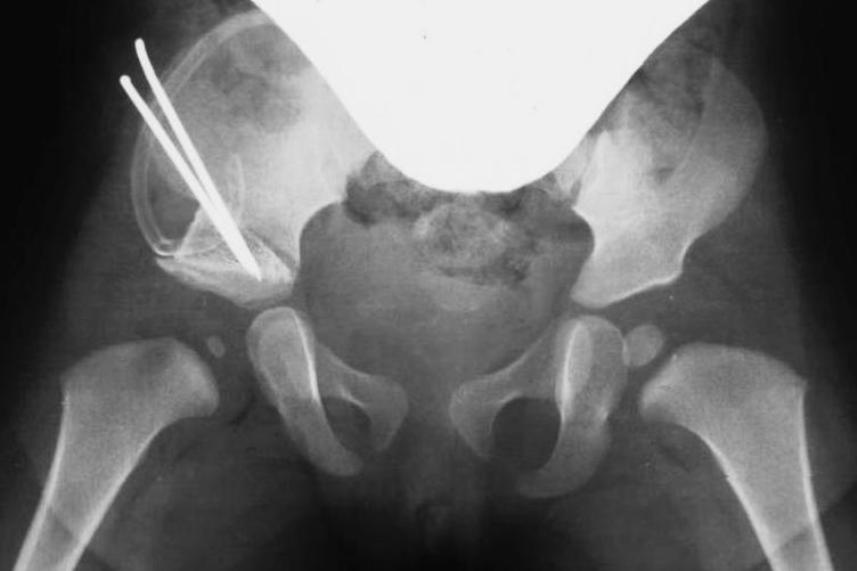
Post-Pemberton osteotomy on the right, with the bone wedge fixed by two Kirschner wires

=== Bone wedge ===
Using autologous bone from the patient is challenging in children. When an intertrochanteric correction is performed simultaneously, the trimmed bone wedge may be used, but it is often too small. Donor bone from bone banks or harvested femoral heads from joint replacement surgeries is commonly used. Donor bones are disinfected and deproteinized in certified thermal disinfection devices and cryopreserved at −20 °C or sterilized in an autoclave with pressurized steam or gamma rays. These processes adhere to strict regulations by the German Medical Association, Medical Devices Act, and Robert Koch Institute.

=== Special cases ===
In rare severe cases, the femoral head cannot be manually repositioned due to extreme dislocation and capsular hypertrophy, with excess capsular tissue obstructing the acetabulum. In such cases, open reduction is performed by surgically opening the joint capsule, removing excess tissue, repositioning the femoral head, and tightening the capsule.

== Complications ==
=== General complications ===
As with any surgery, risks include blood vessel and nerve injuries. The small incision and short procedure time minimize blood loss. Bone fractures during surgery require immediate intraoperative management.

Postoperative complications may include wound infection, chronic wound, arthritis of the hip joint, or, in rare cases, sepsis.

=== Specific complications ===
Intraoperative injuries to organs or major blood vessels are not reported in the literature. Injury or irritation of the lateral femoral cutaneous nerve may occur but is typically reversible. Failure or collapse (sintering fracture) of the bone wedge may necessitate reoperation. A poorly anchored wedge may dislodge, leading to osteolysis of the wedge. The spica cast may cause pressure sores or nerve irritation.

== Postoperative care and rehabilitation ==
The postoperative immobilizing cast is typically worn for six weeks, with X-ray checks after one and three weeks. A cast change, often requiring additional anesthesia, is performed after six weeks. The cast is worn for three months, followed by a splint. Regular follow-up examinations are essential, with longer recovery periods for older children.

== Success rates ==
Studies on acetabuloplasty outcomes, including clinical and radiological follow-ups, report high success rates. A mid-term study of 83 children using the Pemberton technique evaluated outcomes ten years post-surgery, including AC angle correction, bone wedge integration, gait and movement development, and postoperative symptoms. Over 96% of patients and parents rated the outcome as good or very good, with only one rating it poorly.

Early detection of hip dysplasia, now standard through newborn ultrasound screening, enables simpler and more effective treatment.

== History ==
Surgical treatment of acetabular deformities began in the late 19th century. In 1891, F. König in Berlin attempted to tilt a periosteal bone flap over the lateral acetabular rim. Albee (1915) and Jones (1920) developed this concept into the modern acetabuloplasty by inserting bone grafts from the tibia into the osteotomy gap. In 1924, Spitzy attempted to fix tibial bone grafts to the dysplastic acetabular rim to form a new rim during growth, a method later revived as the "shelf procedure." In 1925, P.M. Lance in France refined Albee and Jones' techniques by fixing a bone wedge in the osteotomy gap. These techniques have been continually refined, with contributions from Pemberton and Dega, and ongoing advancements include synthetic bone grafts and minimally invasive surgery.
