= Osteotomy =

Surgically shortening, lengthening, or re-aligning a bone

- ICD-9-CM: 77.3
- MeSH: D010027

An osteotomy is a surgical operation whereby a bone is cut to shorten or lengthen it or to change its alignment. It is sometimes performed to correct a hallux valgus, or to straighten a bone that has healed crookedly following a fracture. It is also used to correct a coxa vara, genu valgum, and genu varum. The operation is done under a general anaesthetic.

Osteotomy is one method to relieve pain of arthritis, especially of the hip and knee. It is being replaced by joint replacement in the older patient.

Due to the serious nature of this procedure, recovery may be extensive. Careful consultation with a physician is important in order to ensure proper planning during a recovery phase. Tools exist to assist recovering patients who may have non–weight bearing requirements and include bedpans, dressing sticks, long-handled shoe-horns, grabbers/reachers and specialized walkers and wheelchairs.

== Osteotomies of the hip ==
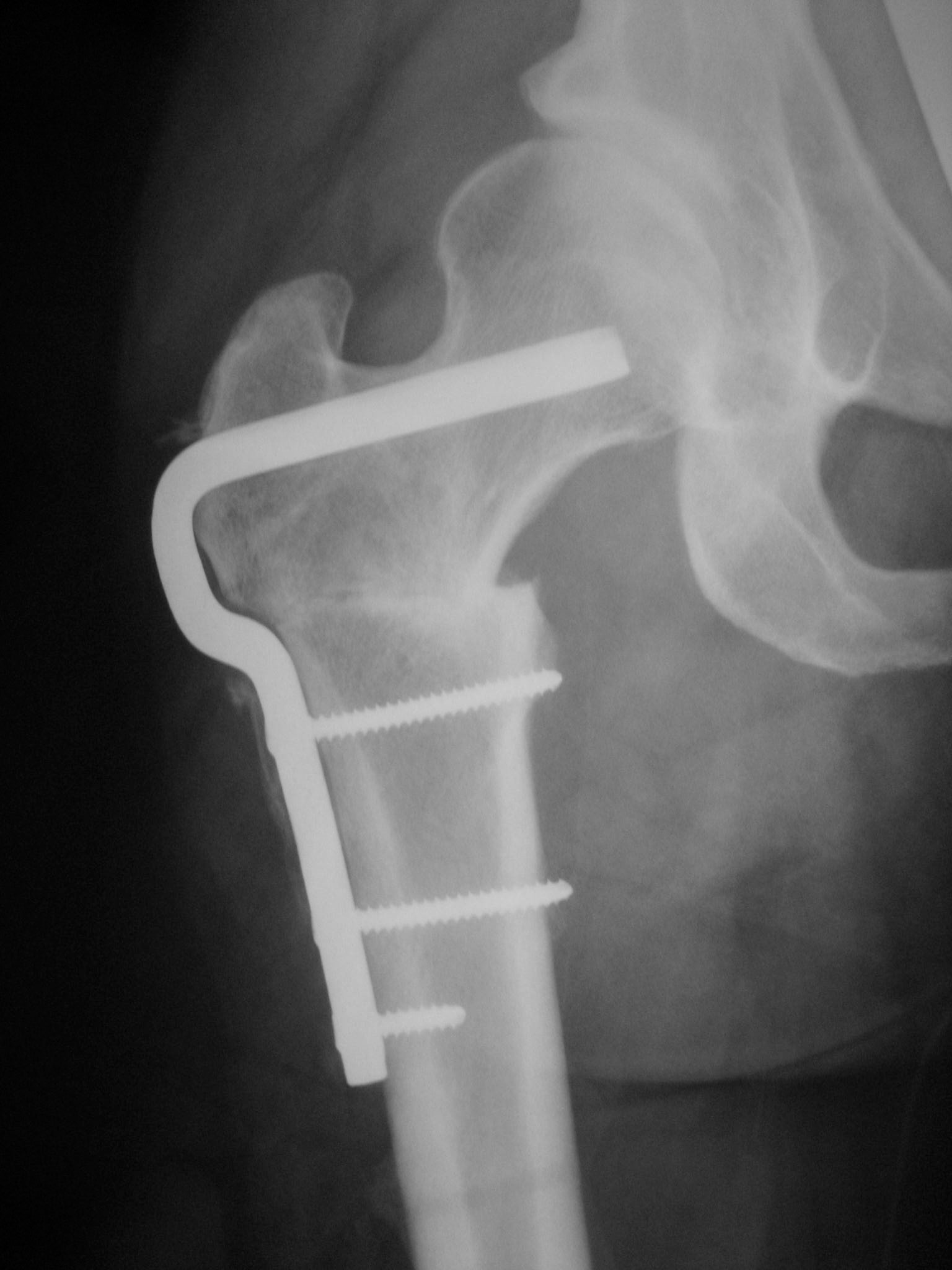
X-ray of Femoral Osteotomy hardware to correct femoral rotation caused by hip dysplasia. X-ray of the right hip in female patient in early thirties.

Two main types of osteotomies are used in the correction of hip dysplasias and deformities to improve alignment/interaction of acetabulum – (socket) – and femoral head (femur head) – (ball), innominate osteotomies and femoral osteotomies. The bones are cut, reshaped or partially removed to realign the load-bearing surfaces of the joint.

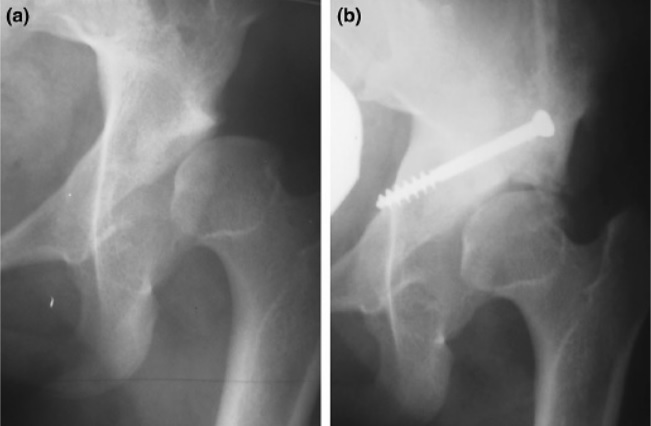
a. X-ray of a hip after capsulorrhaphy and Dega surgery. b. Same hip after addition of Chiari medial displacementosteotomy.

Adjustments are made to part of the hip-bone. Many operating methods and variations have been developed. They are defined by the type of cut and adjustment made. Some acetabular procedures are named after the surgeons who first described them as Salter (R. Salter), Dega (W. Dega), Sutherland (D.H. Sutherland), Chiari (K. Chiari): other names one may encounter are Ludlov, P. Pemberton, and James B. Steele. Some are named after the shape of cut (e.g. Chevron, Wedge) or the way the bones are aligned (Dial=old style rotary dial phone).

A femoral derotation osteotomy can be performed to correct version abnormalities such as excessive anteversion or retroversion of the hip joint. Excessive anteversion of the femur results in anterior instability of the hip joint while excessive retroversion results in femoroacetabular hip impingement.

A subtrochanteric blade plate or an intramedullary rod can be used to stabilize the osteotomy site in a femoral derotation osteotomy until compete bone healing is achieved; an approach employing an intramedullary rod is much less invasive than one using a subtrochanteric blade plate.

Femoral osteotomies, as the name indicates, involves adjustments made to the femur head and/or the femur.

== Osteotomy of the knee ==
Valgus osteotomy. The black line is the mechanical axis.

Knee osteotomy is commonly used to realign arthritic damage on one side of the knee. The goal is to shift the patient's body weight off the damaged area to the other side of the knee, where the cartilage is still healthy. Surgeons remove a wedge of the tibia from underneath the healthy side of the knee, which allows the tibia and femur to bend away from the damaged cartilage.

A model for this is the hinges on a door. When the door is shut, the hinges are flush against the wall. As the door swings open, one side of the door remains pressed against the wall as space opens up on the other side. Removing just a small wedge of bone can "swing" the knee open, pressing the healthy tissue together as space opens up between the femur and tibia on the damaged side so that the arthritic surfaces do not rub against each other.

Osteotomy is also used as an alternative treatment to total knee replacement in younger and active patients. Because prosthetic knees may wear out over time, an osteotomy procedure can enable younger, active osteoarthritis patients to continue using the healthy portion of their knee. The procedure can delay the need for a total knee replacement for up to ten years.

=== Surgery ===
The location of the removed wedge of bone depends on where osteoarthritis has damaged the knee cartilage. The most common type of osteotomy performed on arthritic knees is a high tibial osteotomy, which addresses cartilage damage on the inside (medial) portion of the knee. The procedure usually takes 60 to 90 minutes to perform.

During a high tibial osteotomy, surgeons remove a wedge of bone from the outside of the knee, which causes the leg to bend slightly inward. This resembles the realigning of a bowlegged knee to a knock-kneed position. The patient's weight is transferred to the outside (lateral) portion of the knee, where the cartilage is still healthy.

After regional or general anesthesia is administered, the surgical team sterilizes the leg with antibacterial solution. Surgeons map out the exact size of the bone wedge they will remove, using an X-ray, CT scan, or 3D computer modeling. A four- to five-inch incision is made down the front and outside of the knee, starting below the kneecap and extending below the top of the shinbone.Guide wires are drilled into the top of the shinbone (tibia plateau) from the outside (lateral side) of the knee. The wires usually outline a triangle form in the shinbone.

A standard oscillating saw is run along the guide wires, removing most of the bone wedge from underneath the outside of the knee, below the healthy cartilage. The cartilage surface on the top of the outside (lateral side) of the shinbone is left intact. The top of the shinbone is then lowered on the outside and attached with surgical staples or screws, depending on the size of the wedge that was removed. The layers of tissue in the knee are stitched together, usually with absorbable sutures.

=== Rehabilitation and prevention ===
A fall or torque to the leg during the first two months after surgery may jeopardize healing. Patients must exercise extreme caution during all activities, including walking, until healing is complete.

After rehabilitation, preventing osteoarthritis involves slowing the progression and spread of the disease. Maintaining aerobic cardiovascular fitness has been an effective method for preventing the progression of osteoarthritis. Light, daily exercise is much better for an arthritic knee than occasional, heavy exercise.

It is especially important to avoid any serious knee injuries, such as torn ligaments or fractured bones, because arthritis can complicate knee injury treatment. High-impact or repetitive stress sports, like football and distance running, should be avoided.

Because osteoarthritis has multiple causes and may be related to genetic factors, no universal prevention tactic exists.

General recommendations include:

- Keeping a slight bend in the knees will take the pressure off during standing.
- Avoid activities that causes pain which lasts over an hour.
- Perform controlled range of motion activities that do not overload the joint.
- Avoid heavy impact on the knees during everyday and athletic activities.
- Gently strengthen thigh and lower leg muscles to help protect the bones and cartilage in the knee.
- Non-contact activities keep joints and bones healthy and maintain fitness over time. Exercise also helps promote weight loss, which can take stress off knees.

== Osteotomy of the jaw ==
This is performed to realign the mandible (lower jaw) or maxilla (upper jaw) with the rest of the skull and/or teeth. This is usually performed to correct skeletal malocclusions, that is discrepancies in tooth position that cannot be corrected by simple orthodontic movement, and realignment of the temporomandibular joints, or to correct facial deformities such as mandibular retrognathia. There is little scarring, and all of the surgery takes places inside of the mouth. Orthodontic braces may have to be worn pre- and post- operation to realign the teeth to match the newly realigned jaw.

== Osteotomy of the chin ==
Chin osteotomy is most often done to correct a vertically short chin. As opposed to putting an implant on top of the chin bone to bring it forward, an alternative approach is to cut the chin bone itself and bring it forward or other directions as well. It can also be used to lengthen the chin (which is more difficult with an implant) or to shorten or narrow a chin. (which is impossible with an implant).

Chin osteotomies (cutting the bone and moving it) are done through an incision inside the mouth. It is technically more difficult than an implant and has more swelling and recovery than a simple chin implant. Also, there is usually temporary loss of feeling of the lip and chin after that takes several weeks to months for full return of sensation.

== Veterinary osteotomy procedures ==
In veterinary medicine, osteotomies are frequently performed to address rupture of the canine cranial cruciate ligament, which is analogous to the anterior cruciate ligament. The tibial plateau leveling osteotomy and tibial tuberosity advancement are two of the most common osteotomy procedures performed in the United States. Recovery is often 6–8 weeks and the osteotomy can be filled with autologous bone grafts, scaffolds (hydroxyapatite, TR Matrix, etc.) or ceramics.

== See also ==
- List of surgeries by type
