= Tibial tuberosity advancement =

Orthopedic procedure in dogs

Tibial tuberosity advancement (TTA) is an orthopedic procedure to repair deficient cranial cruciate ligaments in dogs. It has also been used in cats. This procedure was developed by Dr. Slobodan Tepic and Professor Pierre Montavon at the School of Veterinary Medicine, University of Zurich, in Zurich, Switzerland beginning in the late 1990s.

Dr. Slobodan Tepic later founded KYON, a leading provider of veterinary orthopaedic implants, in 1999. Kyon became the first veterinary orthopedic implant company offering this procedure to veterinarians.

The cranial cruciate ligament (CrCL) in dogs, provides the same function as the anterior cruciate ligament in humans. It stabilizes the knee joint, called the stifle joint in quadrupeds, and limits the tibia from sliding forward in relation to the femur. It is attached to the cranial (anterior) medial side of the interdylar notch of the tibia at one end and the caudal (posterior) side of the lateral femoral condyle at the other end. It also helps to prevent the stifle (knee) joint from over-extending or rotating.

Trauma to the equivalent ligament in humans is common, and damage most frequently occurs during some form of sporting activity (including football, rugby and golf). The nature of the injury is very different in dogs. Rather than the ligament suddenly breaking due to excessive trauma, it usually degenerates slowly over time, rather like a fraying rope. This important difference is the primary reason why the treatment options recommended for cruciate ligament injury in dogs are so different from the treatment options recommended for humans.

In the vast majority of dogs, the cranial cruciate ligament (CrCL) ruptures as a result of long-term degeneration, whereby the fibres within the ligament weaken over time. The precise cause of this is not known, but genetic factors are probably most important, with certain breeds being predisposed (including Labradors, Rottweilers, Boxers, West Highland White Terriers and Newfoundlands). Supporting evidence for a genetic cause was primarily obtained by assessment of family lines, coupled with the knowledge that many animals will rupture the CrCL in both knees, often relatively early in life. Other factors such as obesity, individual conformation, hormonal imbalance and certain inflammatory conditions of the joint may also play a role. Uncorrected CrCL deficiencies have been associated with meniscal damage and degenerative joint diseases such as osteoarthritis.

TTA is a surgical procedure designed to correct CrCL deficient stifles. The objective of the TTA is to advance the tibial tuberosity, which changes the angle of the patellar ligament to neutralize the tibiofemoral shear force during weight bearing. A microsaggital saw is used to cut the Tibial Tuberosity off then a special titanium cage is used to advance the tibial tuberosity. A titanium plate is used to hold the tibial tuberosity in position. By neutralizing the shear forces in the stifle caused by a ruptured or weakened CrCL, the joint becomes more stable without compromising joint congruency.

TTA appears to be a less invasive procedure than some other techniques for stabilizing the deficient cranial cruciate ligament such as TPLO (Tibial Plateau Leveling Osteotomy) and TWO (Tibial Wedge Osteotomy), as TTA does not disrupt the primary loading axis of the tibia.

Since KYON first developed the TTA procedure, they have pioneered a new less invasive version of the procedure known as TTA-II. This new TTA procedure delivers the same TTA outcomes with less trauma, fewer implants, a simplified technique and at a reduced cost.

Recently, TR BioSurgical has developed a bioscaffold to be used for veterinary osteotomies as a substitute for autologous cancellous bone grafting.

In 2012 TTA RAPID was introduced by the German manufacturer RITA LEIBINGER Medical GmbH & Co. KG in cooperation with the University of Ghent, Belgium. The TTA RAPID implant is a biocompatible sponge-construction which combines a wedge-cage with a plate on the top. In this way there is only one implant needed for the whole TTA surgery. It is called "rapid" because the implantation is very quick, easy to learn and offers a high stability. The surgery is based on the Maquet-Hole-Technique.

== Alternative procedures ==
- Tibial-plateau-leveling osteotomy
- Tightrope CCL
- Triple tibial osteotomy
- Simitri Stable in Stride
- Cranial tibial wedge osteotomy
