= Walk for Peace =

International peace walk by Buddhist monks

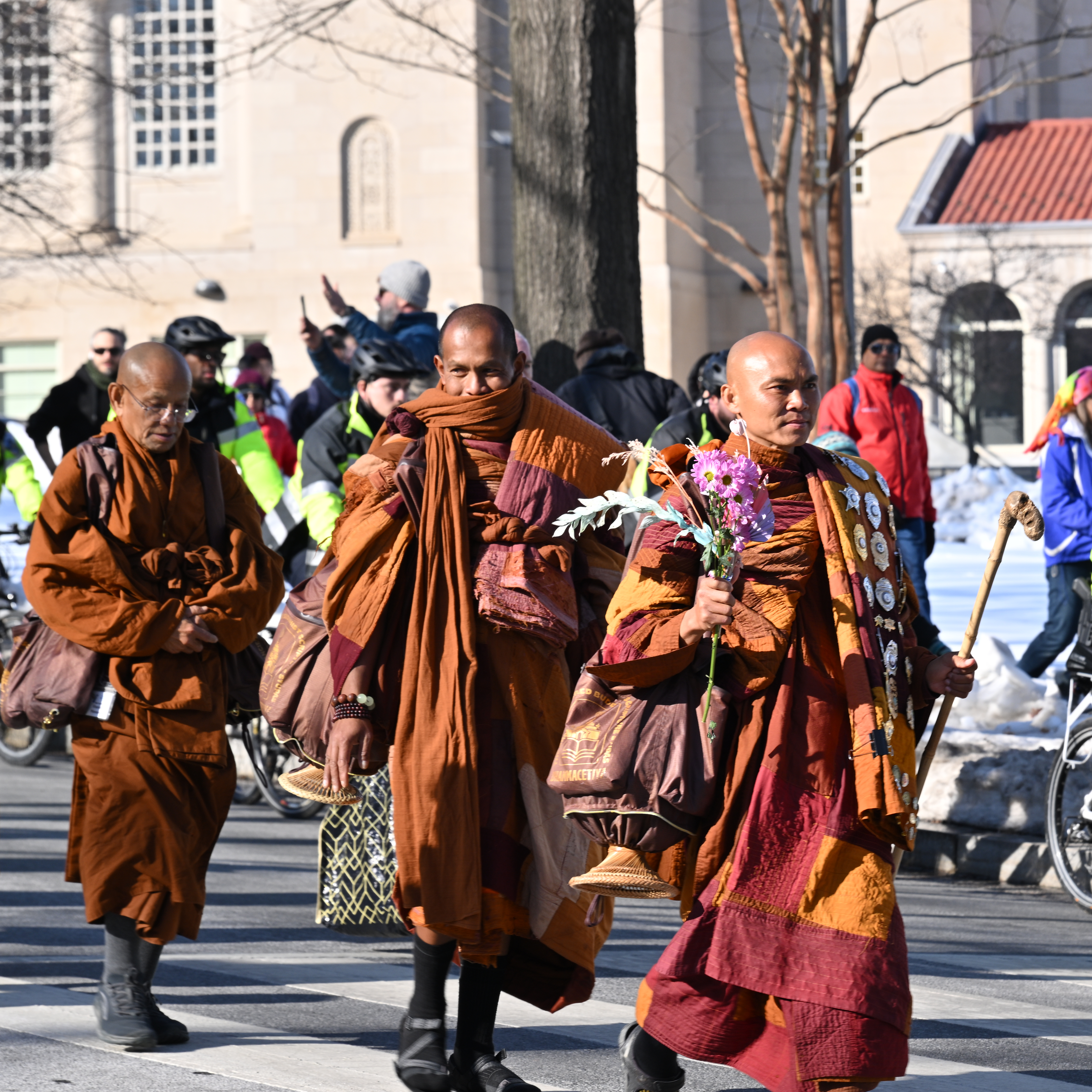
- Bhikkhu Paññākāra leading the walk in Washington, D.C., USA
- Date: October 26, 2025 – February 14, 2026 (United States); April 22, 2026 – present (International)
- Location: United States, Sri Lanka
- Type: Peace walk, Buddhist pilgrimage
- Theme: Peace, Compassion, Nonviolence, Mindfulness
- Participants: Bhikkhu Paññākāra, Theravada monastics, and lay followers
- Website: dhammacetiya.com/walk-for-peace/

The Walk for Peace, also known as the Global Walk for Peace, is an international peace walk founded in 2025. Led by Theravāda Buddhist monks, the movement promotes peace, nonviolence, and mindfulness, and compassion through long-distance journeys and public-engagement activities. The walk gained international attention during its 2,300-mile journey across the United States and its subsequent expansion to Sri Lanka in early 2026.

== Background and philosophy ==
The Walk for Peace was organized by monastics associated with the Hương Đạo Vipassana Bhavana Center in Fort Worth, Texas, under the guidance of Vietnamese-American Theravāda monk Bhikkhu Paññākāra (Sư Tuệ Nhân). The movement draws inspiration from the traditional wandering practices of Buddhist monastics and the 45-year teaching journey of Gautama Buddha. Participants have also observed limited elements of traditional dhutanga practice, such as eating one meal per day and sleeping on the ground, adapted to the practical realities of the American environment.

The movement's central message emphasizes that "peace begins within." Participants promote mindfulness, loving-kindness (metta), interfaith dialogue, and nonviolent conduct as responses to social division, conflict, and suffering.

== Major legs of the journey ==
=== United States: 2025–26 ===
The inaugural walk commenced on October 26, 2025, in Fort Worth, Texas. A group of approximately 15 to 24 Theravāda Buddhist monks traveled roughly 2,300 miles (3,701 km) on foot, passing through nine states -- Texas, Louisiana, Mississippi, Alabama, Georgia, South Carolina, North Carolina, Virginia, and Maryland -- as well as Washington, D.C.

Participants maintained an average pace of 20 to 23 miles (32 to 37 km) per day. The 110-day journey concluded on February 12, 2026, when the monastics departed Annapolis, Maryland, by bus to return to Hương Đạo Vipassana Bhavana Center in Fort Worth, where the Walk had originally begun. A homecoming ceremony was held upon their return on February 14, 2026.

During the journey, one participant was seriously injured in a traffic accident, and later underwent a leg amputation. The incident drew widespread support and public attention internationally, highlighting both the physical hardships of the long-distance journey and the broader message of compassion and resilience promoted by the Walk for Peace.

=== Sri Lanka: 2026 ===
In April 2026, the movement expanded internationally to Sri Lanka. The monks arrived at Bandaranaike International Airport on April 21 and began a week-long walk on April 22 from the Dambulla Rajamaha Viharaya. The route included stops at the Jaya Sri Maha Bodhi in Anuradhapura and the Temple of the Tooth in Kandy, concluding in Colombo. This leg of the walk received official patronage from the Government of Sri Lanka and was accompanied by sacred relics.

== Aloka the Peace Dog ==
A central figure of the walk is Aloka, a rescue dog whose name means "light" in Pali. Aloka was a stray dog encountered by the monks during a 2022 pilgrimage in India. Despite being injured in a road accident at the time, he followed the monks and was subsequently adopted. He accompanied the group throughout the United States and was transported to Sri Lanka for the international leg, becoming a mascot for animal rights and a symbol of universal compassion.

== Reception and impact ==
The walk has been noted for its "embodied practice" of social cohesion. Media outlets reported that the presence of monks in traditional robes walking through the Southern United States fostered unique inter-cultural and inter-religious interactions. Local communities and various faith groups provided food, lodging, and security for the walkers along the route.

In 2026, Bhikkhu Paññākāra was selected for the "Courage Project Award" in recognition of the walk's impact on promoting nonviolence.

== Summary ==
Summary of Global Walk for Peace (2025–present)
No.	Country	Primary dates	Duration	Start	End	Distance (Approx.)
1	(United States)	26 October 2025 – 12 February 2026	110 days	Hương Đạo Vipassana Bhavana Center, Fort Worth, TX	Annapolis, Maryland	3,701 kilometres (2,300 mi)
2	(Sri Lanka)	21 April – 28 April 2026	7 days	Jaya Sri Maha Bodhi, Anuradhapura	Independence Square, Colombo	225 kilometres (140 mi)

== See also ==
- Peace Pilgrim
- Great Peace March for Global Nuclear Disarmament
- Nipponzan-Myōhōji-Daisanga
- Dhammayietra
- Walking meditation
