= Bhikkhu Pannakara =

Vietnamese-American Buddhist monk

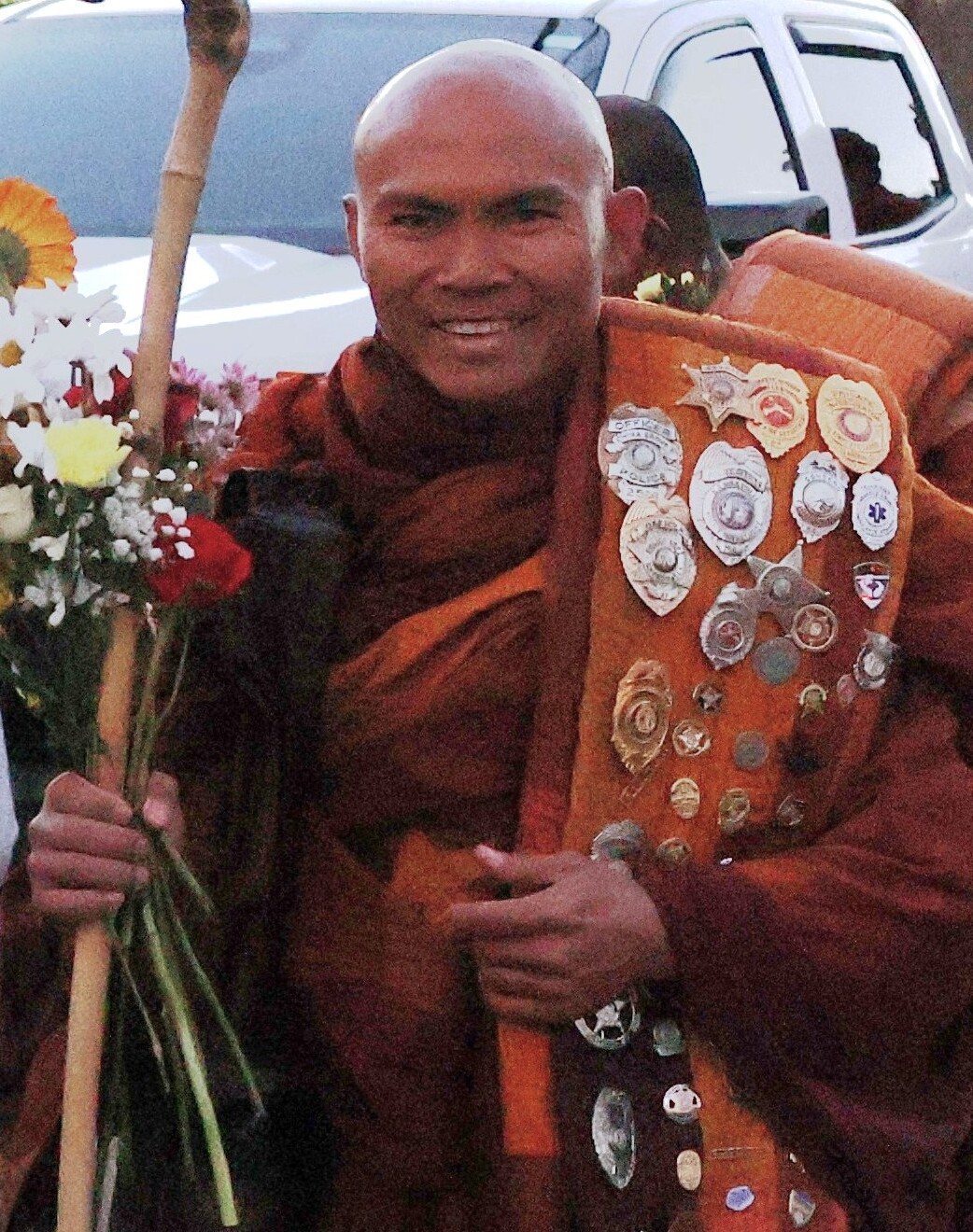
- Born: Vietnam
- Other name: Sư Tuệ Nhân
- Education: University of Texas at Arlington
- Known for: Leading the 2025–2026 "Walk for Peace" across the United States
- Title: Vice President of the Huong Dao Vipassana Bhavana Center
- Website: dhammacetiya.com

Bhikkhu Pannakara, also known as Sư Tuệ Nhân, is a Vietnamese-American Theravada Buddhist monk. He serves as the vice president and deputy abbot of the Huong Dao Vipassana Bhavana Center in Fort Worth, Texas. A former software engineer at Motorola, he received coverage from international media outlets for organizing and leading the 2,300-mile "Walk for Peace" from Texas to Washington, D.C., between October 2025 and February 2026.

== Early life and education ==
Bhikkhu Pannakara was born in Vietnam. He immigrated to the United States in 1997. He pursued higher education in Texas, earning a degree in information technology from the University of Texas at Arlington. Following his graduation, he worked as an engineer for the Motorola corporation.

== Monastic life ==
Pannakara left his career as an engineer to ordain as a novice (samanera) at Huong Dao Temple in Fort Worth, Texas.

Between 2022 and 2023, Pannakara participated in a 112-day Dhutanga pilgrimage in Nepal and India with approximately 100 ascetic monks, walking over 3,400 kilometers through the sacred sites associated with the life of the Buddha. The monks carried only three robes and an alms bowl, slept under open skies, and lived on daily alms. This experience served as the foundation for his memoir, The Footsteps of a Buddhist Monk.

== Walk for Peace (2025–2026) ==
Bhikkhu Pannakara is best known for conceiving and leading the "Walk for Peace", the walk was intended to raise awareness of peace and mindfulness.

The journey began on October 26, 2025, at the Huong Dao Vipassana Bhavana Center in Fort Worth, Texas. The group consisted of between 19 and 24 Theravada monks from monasteries in the United States and abroad, including Thailand, Vietnam, Myanmar and Laos. The group was accompanied by Aloka, the rescue dog he had found during his pilgrimage in India in 2022.

The monks walked in single file, often barefoot, for 108 to 109 days—a sacred number in Buddhism representing spiritual completion. They traversed approximately 2,300 miles (3,700 kilometers) through ten states, facing harsh weather, including snowstorms and freezing temperatures.

In November 2025, near Dayton, Texas, a pickup truck struck the group's escort vehicle, pushing it into two monks. Venerable Phra Ajarnh Maha Dam Phommasan sustained serious injuries that required a leg amputation; however, he rejoined the group to complete the final day in Washington, D.C.

Despite the challenges, the walk gained significant public attention and media coverage. Crowds lined up on the streets along the route in every state they walked.

The culmination of the walk included an interfaith gathering at the Washington National Cathedral on February 10, 2026. The monks were welcomed by Episcopal Bishop of Washington Mariann Edgar Budde and cathedral dean Randy Hollerith. They were joined by more than 100 other Buddhist monks and nuns and leaders from various faith traditions. On February 11, the group first visited Capitol hill and concluded the walk with a closing ceremony at the Lincoln Memorial.

== Teaching and philosophy ==
He describes the purpose of the walk was to promote mindfulness and inner peace. Bhikkhu Pannakara's teachings emphasize mindfulness practice and the cultivation of inner peace as a foundation for social harmony. In media interviews, he has stated that peace begins with individual awareness and disciplined practice. By prioritizing practice over rhetoric, he encourages others to focus on the simple rhythm of their breath and heartbeat to cultivate a profound, present-moment awareness.

== Publications ==
- The Footsteps of a Buddhist Monk (memoir)

== See also ==
- Buddhism in the United States
- Theravada
- Dhutanga
- List of peace activists
