= Tibial-plateau-leveling osteotomy =

Joint surgery for dogs

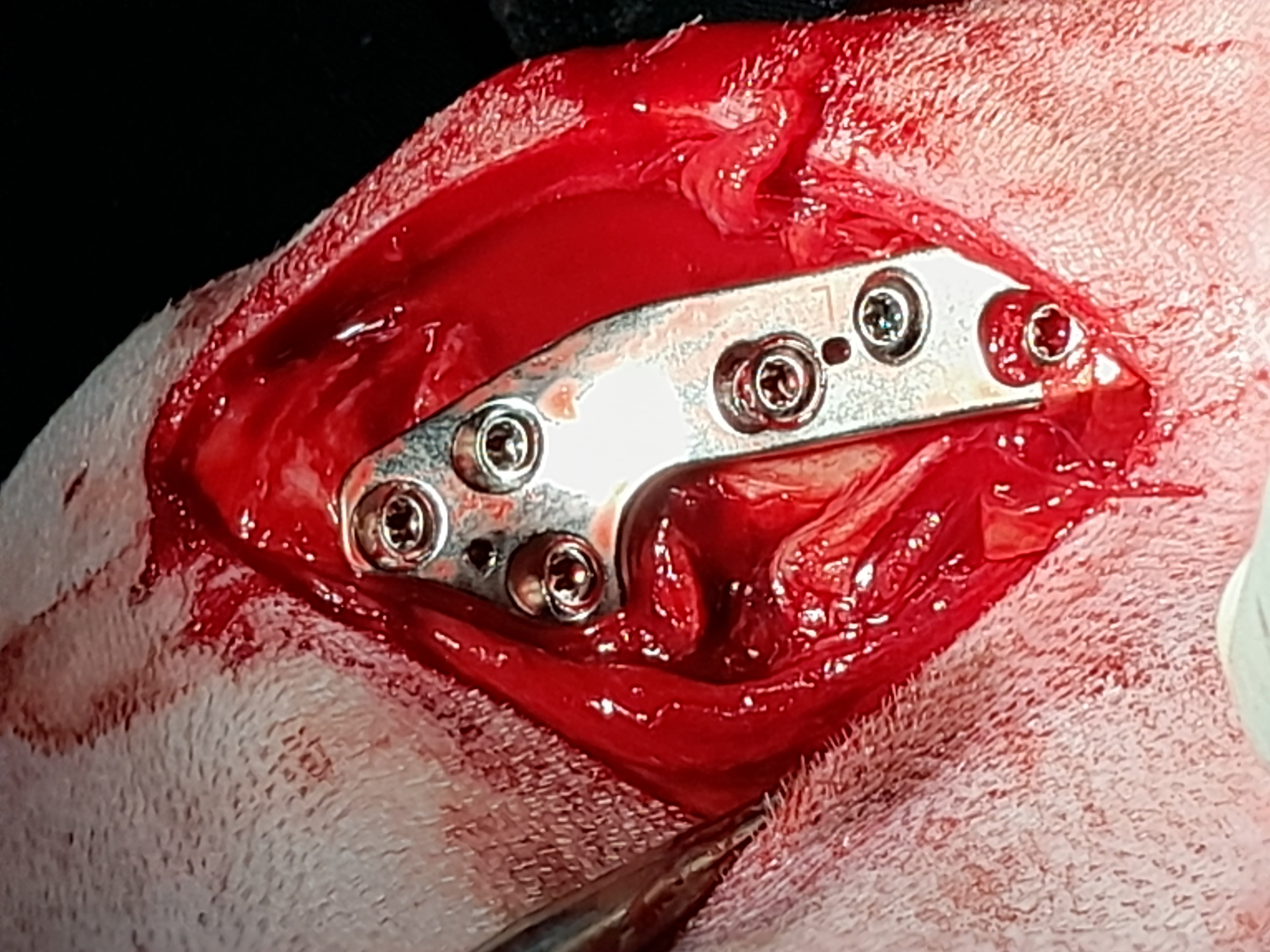
TPLO in a dog

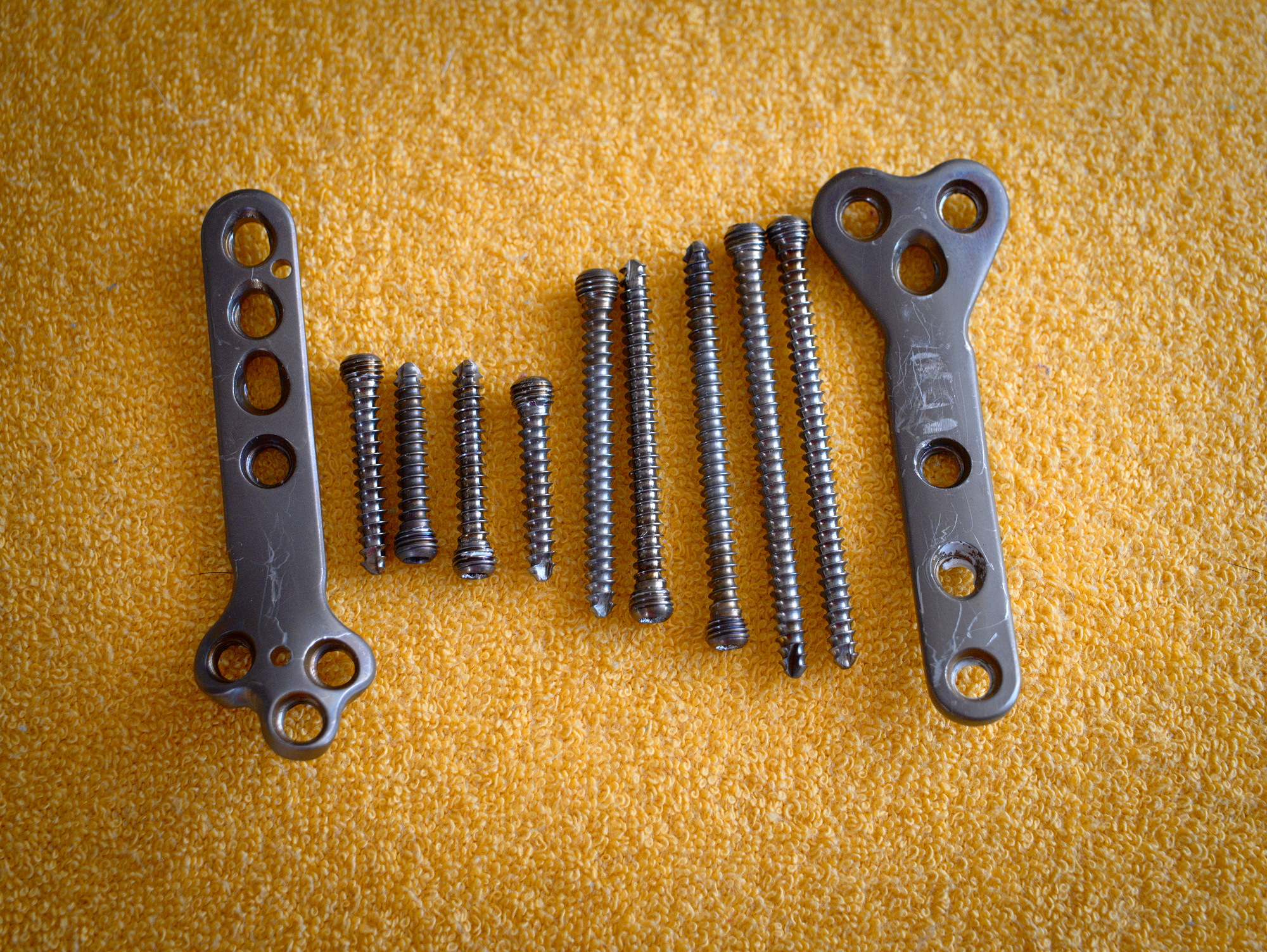
Dog's titanium TPLO implant

TPLO, or tibial-plateau-leveling osteotomy, is a surgery performed on dogs to stabilize the stifle joint after ruptures of the cranial cruciate ligament (analogous to the anterior cruciate ligament [ACL] in humans, and sometimes colloquially called the same).

In the vast majority of dogs, the cranial cruciate ligament (CrCL) ruptures as a result of long-term degeneration, whereby the fibres within the ligament weaken over time. The precise cause of this is not known, but genetic factors are probably most important, with certain breeds being predisposed (including Labradors, Rottweilers, Boxers, West Highland White Terriers and Newfoundlands). Supporting evidence for a genetic cause was primarily obtained by assessment of family lines, coupled with the knowledge that many animals will rupture the CrCL in both knees, often relatively early in life. Other factors such as obesity, individual conformation, hormonal imbalance and certain inflammatory conditions of the joint may also play a role.

The cranial cruciate ligament runs from the cranial mid part of the tibial intercondylar eminence to the lateral condyle of the femur. Normally, the CrCL prevents caudal (backward) movement of the femur relative to the tibia. Due to selective breeding, the tibial plateau slope has become sloped too far backwards so there is a constant stress on the Cranial cruciate ligament. Over time this leads to a degenerative rupture. When it ruptures, the joint becomes unstable which causes pain and can lead to chronic progressive arthritis in the stifle if untreated.

In a TPLO procedure, the tibial plateau, the portion of the tibia adjoining the stifle, is cut and rotated so that its slope changes to approximately 5 degrees from the horizontal plane. This prevents the femur from sliding down the slope of the tibial plateau when the dog puts weight on its knee. This surgery generally results in faster recovery times compared to other procedures to stabilize the knee. Most dogs (over 90%) are expected to regain a very active and athletic lifestyle with no post-operative complications and without the need for any long-term pain relieving medication. Many surgeons are now conducting TPLOs on small dogs, believing that these pets, like large dogs, have a faster and more complete return to function than with other procedures.

A systematic review of the evidence has shown that "…functional recovery in the intermediate postoperative time period was superior following TPLO compared with lateral extracapsular suture."

== Alternative procedures ==
- Tibial tuberosity advancement
- Tightrope CCL
- Triple tibial osteotomy
- Simitri Stable in Stride
- Cranial tibial wedge osteotomy
