= 2014 United States House of Representatives elections in Arizona =

- November 4, 2014

All 9 Arizona seats to the United States House of Representatives
	Majority party	Minority party
Party	Republican	Democratic
Last election	4	5
Seats won	5	4
Seat change	▲1	▼1
Popular vote	817,345	557,960
Percentage	55.9%	39.4%
Swing	▲3.6%	▼4.2%

Republican
50–60%
60–70%
70–80%
Democratic
50–60%
60–70%
70–80%

The 2014 United States House of Representatives elections in Arizona were held on Tuesday, November 4, 2014, to elect the nine U.S. representatives from the state of Arizona, one from each of the state's nine congressional districts, with Democratic and Republican primaries taking place on August 26. The elections coincided with the elections of other federal and state offices, including governor of Arizona.

== Overview ==
The table below shows the total number and percentage of votes, as well as the number of seats gained and lost by each political party in the election for the United States House of Representatives in Arizona. In addition, the voter turnout and the number of votes not valid are listed below.

=== Statewide ===
Party	Candidates	Votes		Seats		
Party	Candidates	No.	%	No.	+/–	%
Republican	9	817,168	55.68	5	▲1	55.56
Democratic	8	577,943	39.38	4	▼1	44.44
Americans Elect	2	44,924	3.06	0	Steady	0.0
Libertarian	3	23,767	1.62	0	Steady	0.0
Write-in	7	3,801	0.26	0	Steady	0.0
Total	28	1,467,603	100.0	9	Steady	100.0

Popular vote
Republican	55.68%
Democratic	39.38%
Americans Elect	3.06%
Libertarian	1.62%
Other	0.26%

House seats
Republican	55.56%
Democratic	44.44%

=== By district ===
Results of the 2014 United States House of Representatives elections in Arizona by district:

District	Republican		Democratic		Others		Total		Result
District	Votes	%	Votes	%	Votes	%	Votes	%	Result
District 1	87,723	47.39%	97,391	52.61%	0	0.00%	185,114	100.0%	Democratic hold
District 2	109,704	50.01%	109,543	49.94%	104	0.05%	219,351	100.0%	Republican gain
District 3	46,185	44.23%	58,192	55.72%	51	0.05%	104,428	100.0%	Democratic hold
District 4	122,560	69.96%	45,179	25.79%	7,440	4.25%	175,179	100.0%	Republican hold
District 5	124,867	69.58%	54,596	30.42%	0	0.00%	179,463	100.0%	Republican hold
District 6	129,578	64.86%	70,198	35.14%	0	0.00%	199,776	100.0%	Republican hold
District 7	129	0.18%	54,235	74.85%	18,090	24.97%	72,454	100.0%	Democratic hold
District 8	128,710	75.81%	0	0.00%	41,066	24.19%	169,776	100.0%	Republican hold
District 9	67,841	41.86%	88,609	54.68%	5,612	3.46%	162,062	100.0%	Democratic hold
Total	817,168	55.68%	577,943	39.38%	72,492	4.94%	1,467,603	100.0%	

== District 1 ==
2014 Arizona's 1st congressional district election
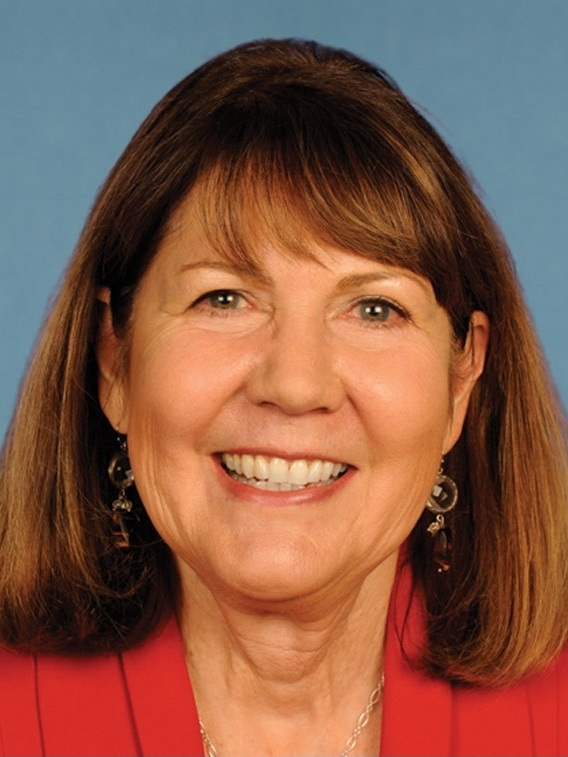

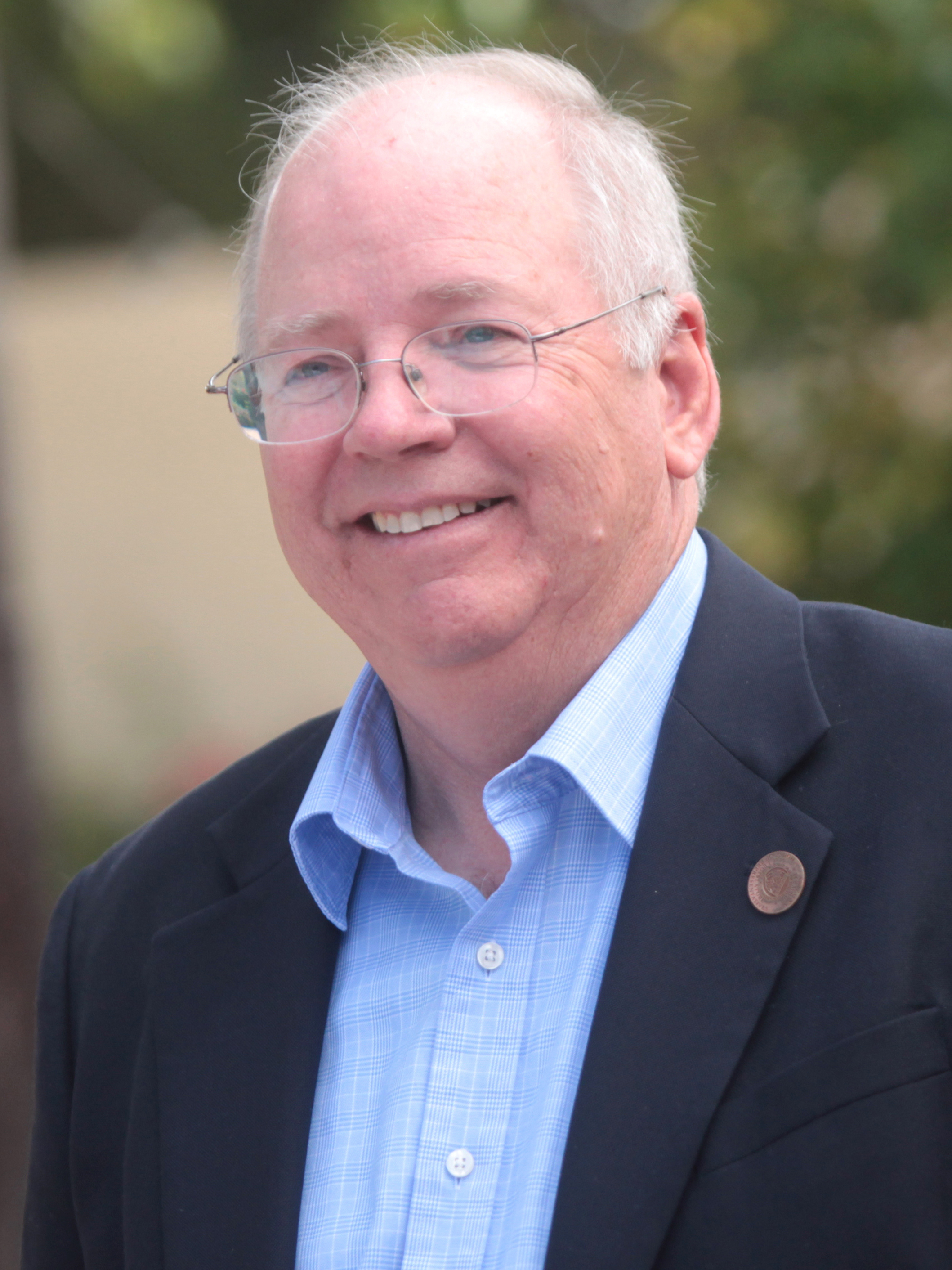
Nominee	Ann Kirkpatrick	Andy Tobin
Party	Democratic	Republican
Popular vote	97,391	87,723
Percentage	52.6%	47.4%
- County results Kirkpatrick: 50–60% 60–70% 70–80% 80–90% Tobin: 50–60% 60–70%
U.S. Representative before election
Ann Kirkpatrick
Democratic
Elected U.S. Representative
Ann Kirkpatrick
Democratic

Incumbent Democrat Ann Kirkpatrick, who won election to the House of Representatives in 2012, ran for re-election. She had previously served in this district from 2007 to 2009.

=== Democratic primary ===
==== Candidates ====
===== Nominee =====
- Ann Kirkpatrick, incumbent U.S. representative

==== Results ====
Democratic primary results
Party	Candidate	Votes	%
Democratic	Ann Kirkpatrick (incumbent)	51,393	100.0
Total votes		51,393	100.0

=== Republican primary ===
==== Candidates ====
===== Nominee =====
- Andy Tobin, state house Speaker

===== Eliminated in primary =====
- Gary Kiehne, rancher
- Adam Kwasman, state representative

===== Declined =====
- Paul Babeu, Pinal County sheriff and candidate for the 4th district in 2012

==== Polling ====
Poll source	Date(s) administered	Sample size	Margin of error	Gary Kiehne	Adam Kwasman	Andy Tobin	Undecided
Remington	August 17–19, 2014	420	± 4.8%	21%	29%	30%	20%

==== Debate ====
2014 Arizona's 1st congressional district republican primary debate
No.	Date	Host	Moderator	Link	Republican	Republican	Republican
Key: P Participant A Absent N Not invited I Invited W Withdrawn							
Key: P Participant A Absent N Not invited I Invited W Withdrawn					Gary Kiehne	Adam Kwasman	Andy Tobin
1	Jun. 8, 2014	Arizona PBS	Ted Simons	PBS	P	P	P

==== Results ====
Republican primary results
Party	Candidate	Votes	%
Republican	Andy Tobin	18,814	35.8
Republican	Gary Kiehne	18,407	35.1
Republican	Adam Kwasman	15,266	29.1
Total votes		52,487	100.0

=== General election ===
==== Debate ====
2014 Arizona's 1st congressional district debate
No.	Date	Host	Moderator	Link	Democratic	Republican
Key: P Participant A Absent N Not invited I Invited W Withdrawn						
Key: P Participant A Absent N Not invited I Invited W Withdrawn					Ann Kirkpatrick	Andy Tobin
1	Sep. 23, 2014	Arizona PBS	Ted Simons	PBS	P	P

==== Endorsements ====
Ann Kirkpatrick (D)

Labor unions

- AFL-CIO
- International Brotherhood of Boilermakers
- National Association of Letter Carriers

Organizations

- Democratic Congressional Campaign Committee "Frontline" Program
- EMILY's List
- National Organization for Women

Newspapers

- Arizona Republic
Andy Tobin (R)

Organizations

- BIPAC
- National Republican Congressional Committee "Young Guns" Program

==== Polling ====
Poll source	Date(s) administered	Sample size	Margin of error	Ann Kirkpatrick (D)	Andy Tobin (R)	Undecided
New York Times/CBS News Battleground Tracker	October 16–23, 2014	357	± 12.0%	47%	47%	7%
North Star (R-Tobin)	September 16–18, 2014	400	± 4.9%	42%	48%	10%
Tarrance Group (R-Tobin)	September 2–4, 2014	405	± 4.9%	43%	51%	6%

==== Predictions ====
Source	Ranking	As of
The Cook Political Report	Tossup	November 3, 2014
Rothenberg	Tossup	October 24, 2014
Sabato's Crystal Ball	Lean R (flip)	October 30, 2014
RCP	Tossup	November 2, 2014
Daily Kos Elections	Tossup	November 4, 2014

==== Results ====
Arizona’s 1st congressional district, 2014
Party	Candidate	Votes	%
Democratic	Ann Kirkpatrick (incumbent)	97,391	52.6
Republican	Andy Tobin	87,723	47.4
Total votes		185,114	100.0
Democratic hold			

== District 2 ==
2014 Arizona's 2nd congressional district election
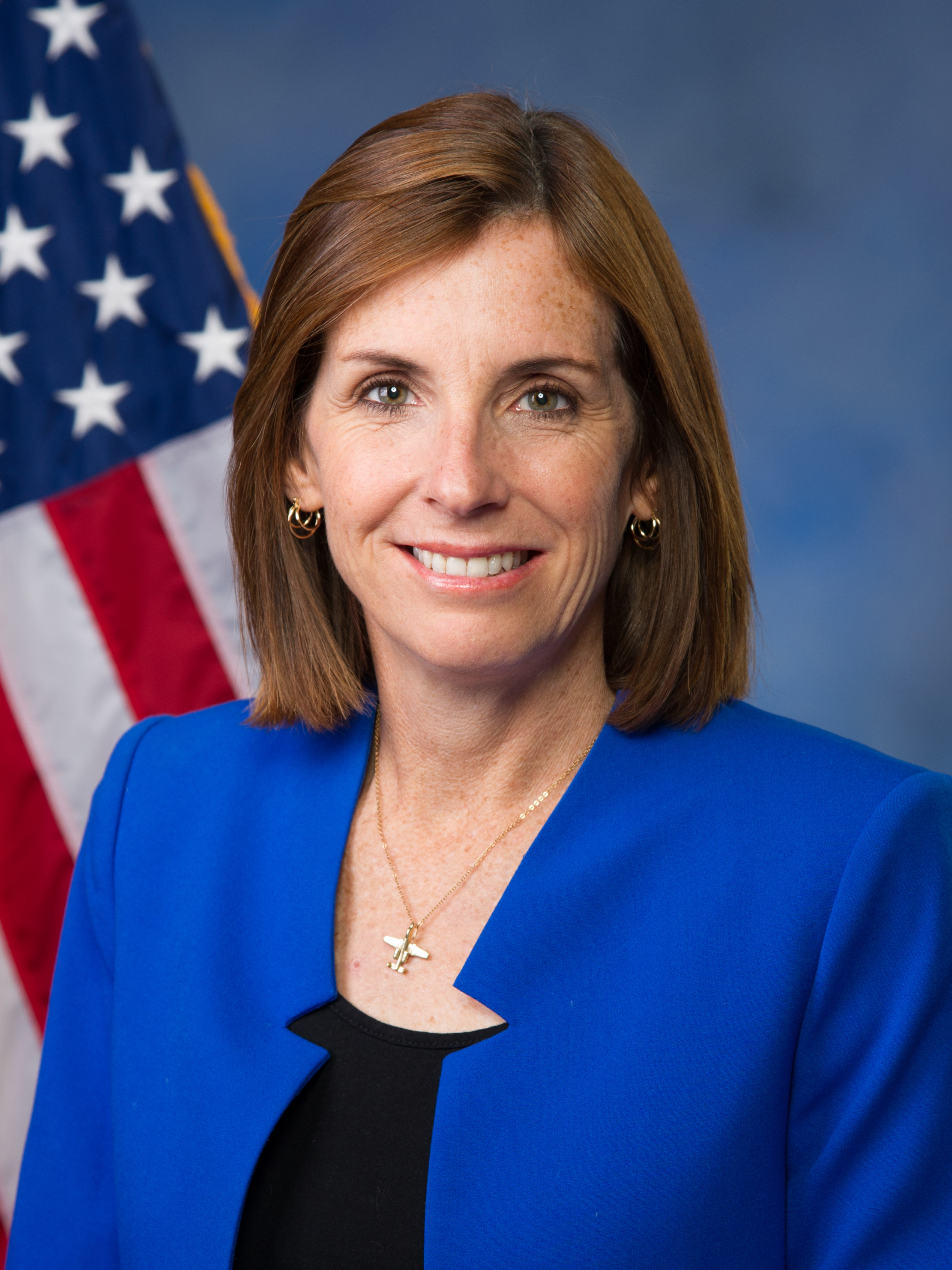

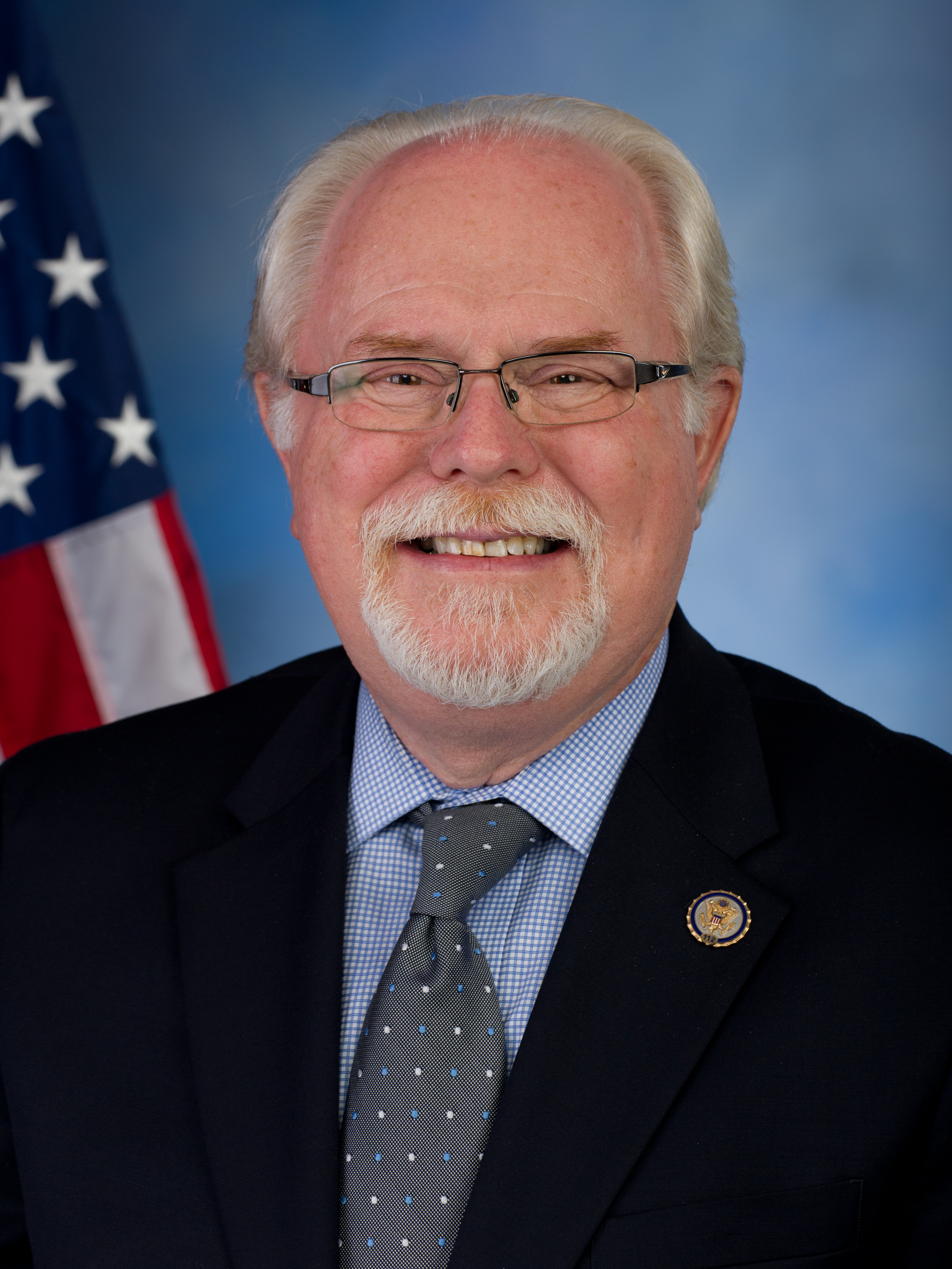
Nominee	Martha McSally	Ron Barber
Party	Republican	Democratic
Popular vote	109,704	109,543
Percentage	50.0%	49.9%
- County results Barber: 50–60% Mcsally: 50–60%
U.S. Representative before election
Ron Barber
Democratic
Elected U.S. Representative
Martha McSally
Republican

Democrat Ron Barber, who was elected to a full term in the House of Representatives in 2012, ran for re-election.

=== Democratic primary ===
==== Candidates ====
===== Nominee =====
- Ron Barber, incumbent U.S. representative

==== Results ====
Democratic primary results
Party	Candidate	Votes	%
Democratic	Ron Barber (incumbent)	49,039	100.0
Total votes		49,039	100.0

=== Republican primary ===
==== Candidates ====
===== Nominee =====
- Martha McSally, retired U.S. Air Force colonel, candidate for the 8th District in 2012 (special) and nominee for this seat in 2012

===== Eliminated in primary =====
- Shelley Kais, small business owner
- Chuck Wooten, business development consultant

==== Results ====
Republican primary results
Party	Candidate	Votes	%
Republican	Martha McSally	45,492	69.3
Republican	Chuck Wooten	14,995	22.9
Republican	Shelley Kais	5,103	7.8
Total votes		65,590	100.0

=== General election ===
==== Endorsements ====
Ron Barber (D)

Labor unions

- AFL-CIO
- International Brotherhood of Boilermakers
- National Association of Letter Carriers

Organizations

- Democratic Congressional Campaign Committee "Frontline" Program
- Everytown for Gun Safety
- Sierra Club
Martha McSally (R)

Organizations

- National Republican Congressional Committee "Young Guns" Program

==== Polling ====
Poll source	Date(s) administered	Sample size	Margin of error	Ron Barber (D)	Martha McSally (R)	Undecided
PMI/RRH	October 21–23, 2014	554	± 4.0%	48%	46%	5%
New York Times/CBS News Battleground Tracker	October 16–23, 2014	621	± 6.0%	45%	44%	10%
Normington Petts (D-Barber)	June 8–10, 2014	400	± 4.9%	45%	37%	18%
On Message Inc. (R-McSally)	April 14–16, 2014	400	± 4.9%	42%	45%	9%
On Message Inc. (R-McSally)	June 17–18, 2013	400	± 4.9%	46%	45%	9%

==== Predictions ====
Source	Ranking	As of
The Cook Political Report	Tossup	November 3, 2014
Rothenberg	Tossup	October 24, 2014
Sabato's Crystal Ball	Lean D	October 30, 2014
RCP	Tossup	November 2, 2014
Daily Kos Elections	Tossup	November 4, 2014

==== Results ====
As the election margin was less than 1% in favor of McSally, a recount began on December 3, 2014. McSally won the recount by 161 votes. This was the closest House race in 2014.

Arizona’s 2nd congressional district, 2014
Party	Candidate	Votes	%
Republican	Martha McSally	109,704	50.0
Democratic	Ron Barber (incumbent)	109,543	49.9
None	Sampson U. Ramirez (write-in)	56	0.0
Republican	Sydney Dudikoff (write-in)	48	0.0
Total votes		219,351	100.0
Republican gain from Democratic			

== District 3 ==
2014 Arizona's 3rd congressional district election
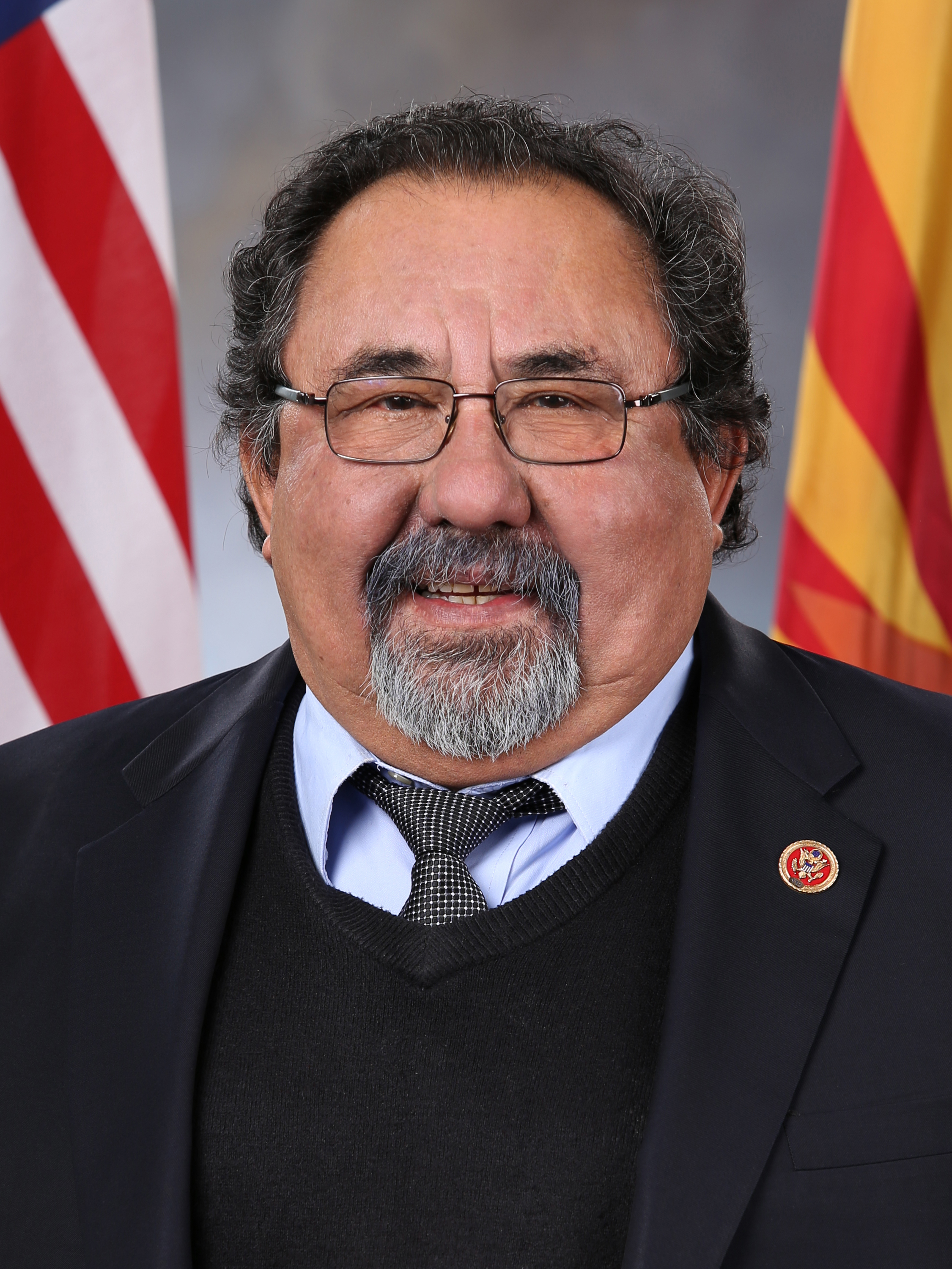

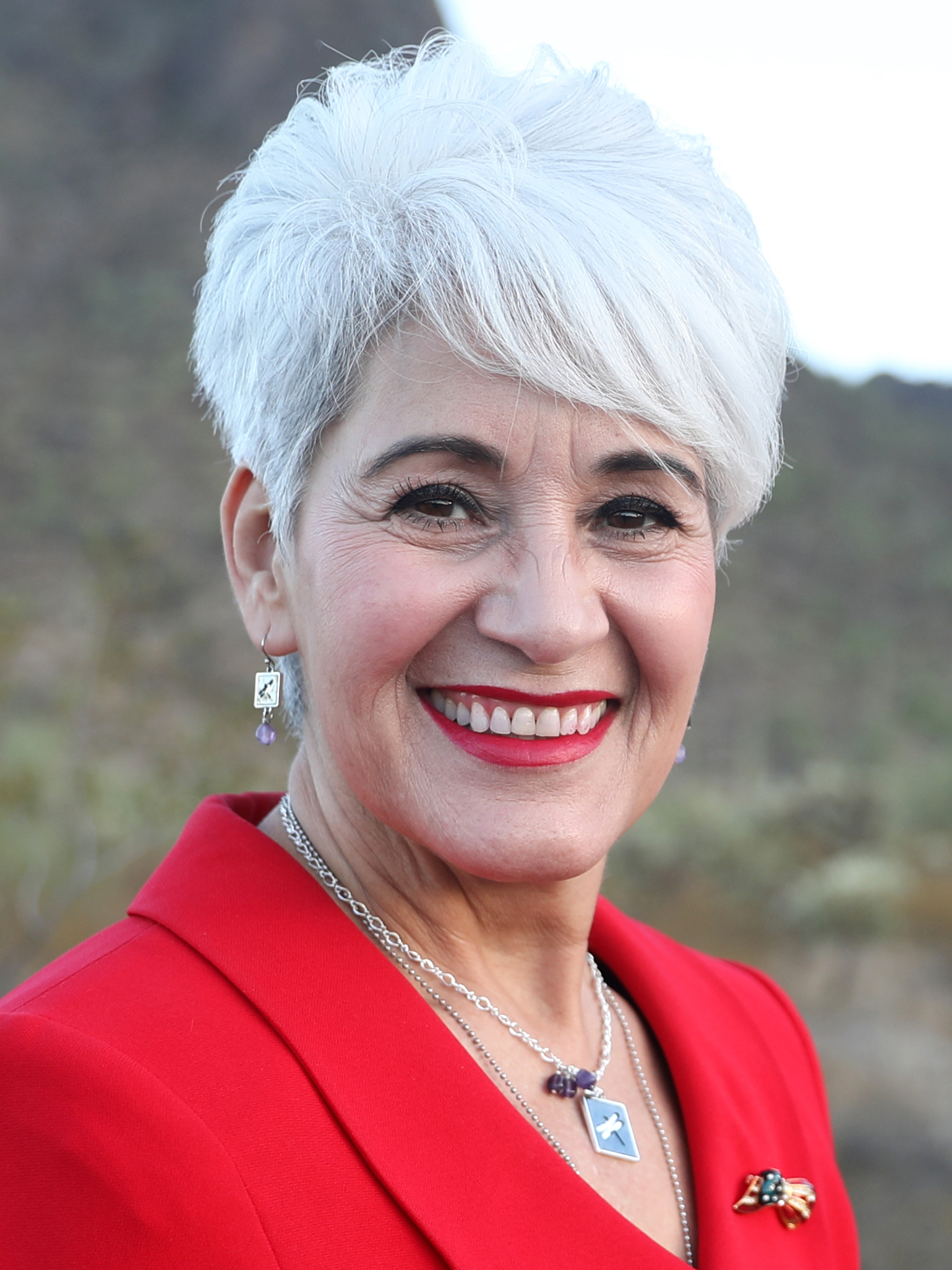
Nominee	Raúl Grijalva	Gabriela Saucedo Mercer
Party	Democratic	Republican
Popular vote	58,192	46,185
Percentage	55.7%	44.2%
- County results Grijalva: 50–60% 60–70% >90% Mercer: 50–60%
U.S. Representative before election
Raúl Grijalva
Democratic
Elected U.S. Representative
Raúl Grijalva
Democratic

Democrat Raúl Grijalva, who had represented the district since 2002, ran for re-election.

=== Democratic primary ===
==== Candidates ====
===== Nominee =====
- Raúl Grijalva, incumbent U.S. representative

==== Results ====
Democratic primary results
Party	Candidate	Votes	%
Democratic	Raúl Grijalva (incumbent)	28,758	100.0
Total votes		28,758	100.0

=== Republican primary ===
==== Candidates ====
===== Nominee =====
- Gabriela Saucedo Mercer, conservative activist and nominee for this seat in 2012

==== Results ====
Republican primary results
Party	Candidate	Votes	%
Republican	Gabby Saucedo Mercer	18,823	100.0
Total votes		18,823	100.0

=== Libertarian primary ===
==== Candidates ====
===== Withdrawn =====
- Miguel Olivas

=== General election ===
==== Predictions ====
Source	Ranking	As of
The Cook Political Report	Safe D	November 3, 2014
Rothenberg	Safe D	October 24, 2014
Sabato's Crystal Ball	Safe D	October 30, 2014
RCP	Safe D	November 2, 2014
Daily Kos Elections	Safe D	November 4, 2014

==== Endorsements ====
Raúl Grijalva (D)

Labor unions

- AFL-CIO
- International Brotherhood of Boilermakers
- National Association of Letter Carriers

Organizations

- Human Rights Campaign
- National Organization for Women
- Progressive Change Campaign Committee
- Sierra Club

==== Results ====
Arizona’s 3rd congressional district, 2014
Party	Candidate	Votes	%
Democratic	Raúl Grijalva (incumbent)	58,192	55.7
Republican	Gabriela Saucedo Mercer	46,185	44.2
Independent	F. Sanchez (write-in)	43	0.0
Independent	Lee Thompson (write-in)	8	0.0
Total votes		104,428	100.0
Democratic hold			

== District 4 ==
2014 Arizona's 4th congressional district election
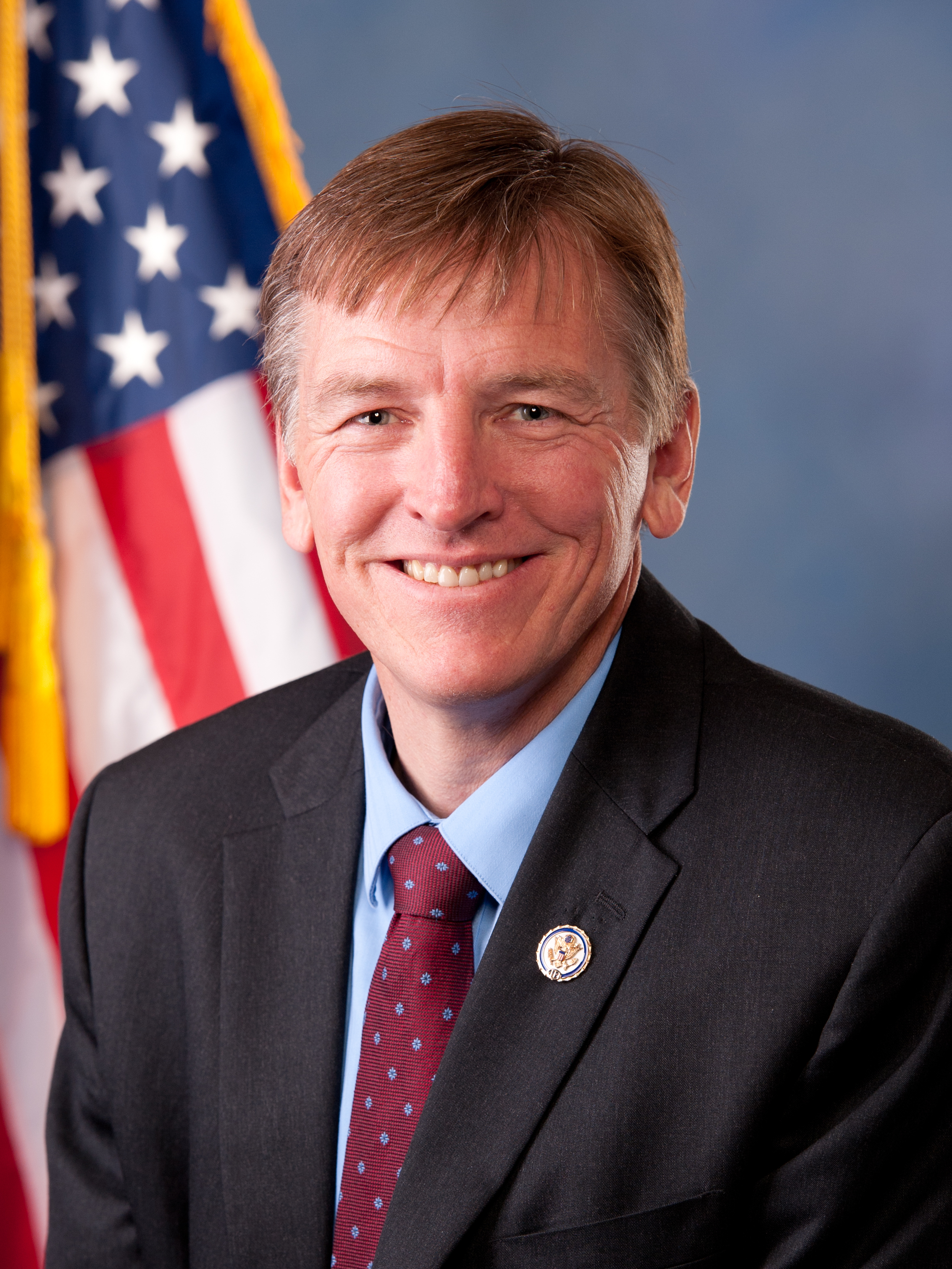

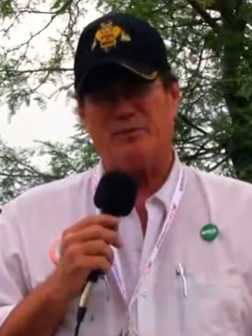
Nominee	Paul Gosar	Mikel Weisser
Party	Republican	Democratic
Popular vote	122,560	45,179
Percentage	70.0%	25.8%
- County results Gosar: 60–70% 70–80%
U.S. Representative before election
Paul Gosar
Republican
Elected U.S. Representative
Paul Gosar
Republican

Republican Paul Gosar, who had represented the district since 2010, ran for re-election.

=== Republican primary ===
==== Candidates ====
===== Nominee =====
- Paul Gosar, incumbent U.S. representative

===== Withdrawn =====
- Kristopher Mortensen

==== Results ====
Republican primary results
Party	Candidate	Votes	%
Republican	Paul Gosar (incumbent)	65,354	100.0
Total votes		65,354	100.0

=== Democratic primary ===
==== Candidates ====
===== Nominee =====
- Mikel Weisser, author, political activist and candidate for this seat in 2012

==== Results ====
Democratic primary results
Party	Candidate	Votes	%
Democratic	Mike Weisser	19,643	100.0
Total votes		19,643	100.0

=== Libertarian primary ===
==== Candidates ====
===== Nominee =====
- Chris Rike

==== Results ====
Libertarian primary results
Party	Candidate	Votes	%
Libertarian	Chris Rike (write-in)	29	100.0
Total votes		29	100.0

=== General election ===
==== Predictions ====
Source	Ranking	As of
The Cook Political Report	Safe R	November 3, 2014
Rothenberg	Safe R	October 24, 2014
Sabato's Crystal Ball	Safe R	October 30, 2014
RCP	Safe R	November 2, 2014
Daily Kos Elections	Safe R	November 4, 2014

==== Endorsements ====
Paul Gosar (R)

Organizations

- National Federation of Independent Business

==== Results ====
Arizona’s 4th congressional district, 2014
Party	Candidate	Votes	%
Republican	Paul Gosar (incumbent)	122,560	70.0
Democratic	Mike Weisser	45,179	25.8
Libertarian	Chris Rike	7,440	4.2
Total votes		175,179	100.0
Republican hold			

== District 5 ==
2014 Arizona's 5th congressional district election
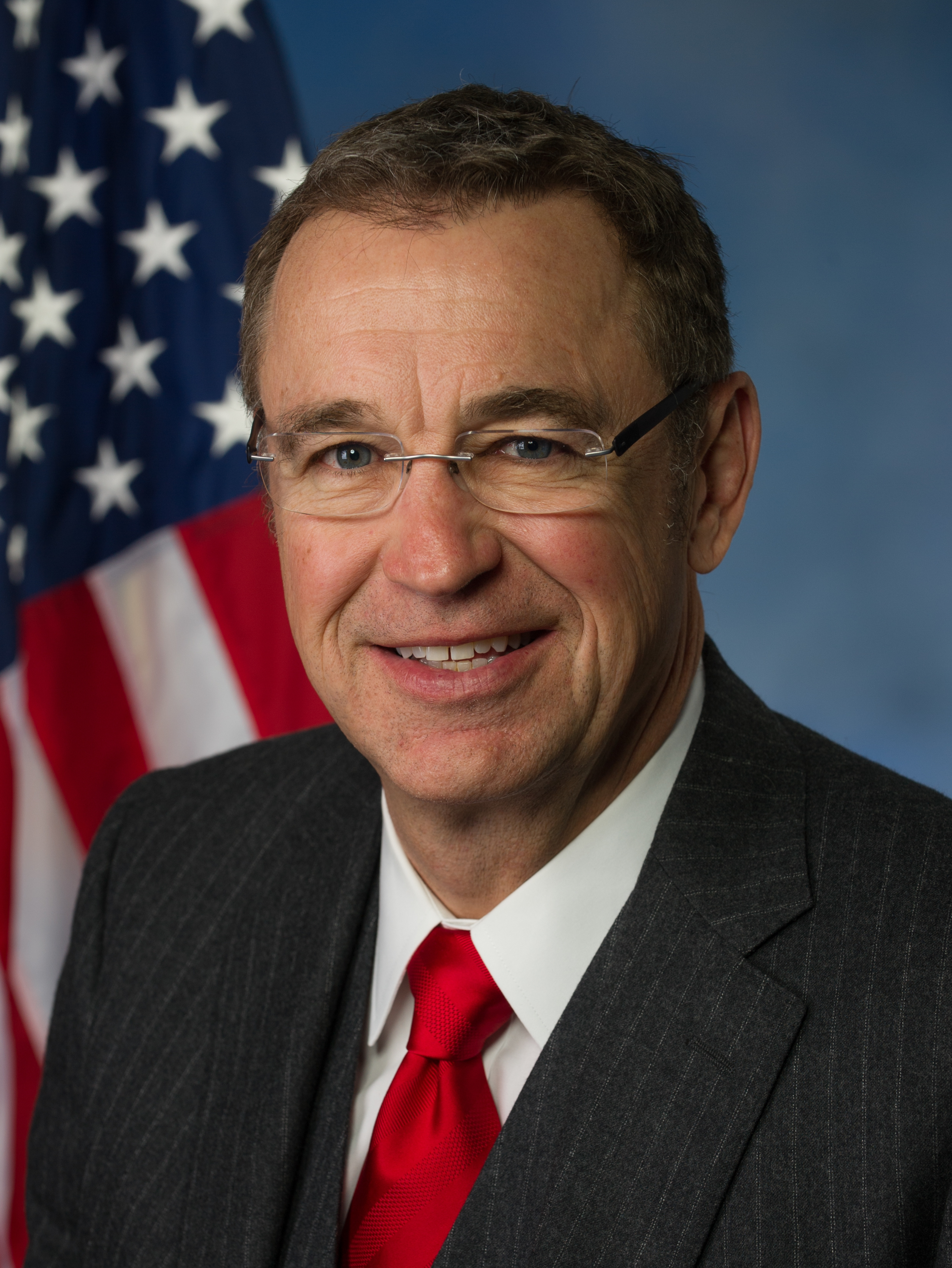

Nominee	Matt Salmon	James Woods
Party	Republican	Democratic
Popular vote	124,867	54,596
Percentage	69.6%	30.4%
- Precinct results Salmon: 50–60% 60–70% 70–80%
U.S. Representative before election
Matt Salmon
Republican
Elected U.S. Representative
Matt Salmon
Republican

Republican Matt Salmon, who had represented the district since 2012, ran for re-election. He had previously served from 1995 to 2001.

=== Republican primary ===
==== Candidates ====
===== Nominee =====
- Matt Salmon, incumbent U.S. representative

==== Results ====
Republican primary results
Party	Candidate	Votes	%
Republican	Matt Salmon (incumbent)	71,690	100.0
Total votes		71,690	100.0

=== Democratic primary ===
==== Candidates ====
===== Nominee =====
- James Woods

==== Results ====
Democratic primary results
Party	Candidate	Votes	%
Democratic	James Woods	20,249	100.0
Total votes		20,249	100.0

=== General election ===
==== Campaign ====
Woods was looking to make history as the first openly atheist candidate to be elected to the U.S. Congress (former California Congressman Pete Stark, who served from 1973 to 2013, is an atheist but did not reveal this until 2007; former Massachusetts Congressman Barney Frank revealed that he was an atheist after he left office).

==== Predictions ====
Source	Ranking	As of
The Cook Political Report	Safe R	November 3, 2014
Rothenberg	Safe R	October 24, 2014
Sabato's Crystal Ball	Safe R	October 30, 2014
RCP	Safe R	November 2, 2014
Daily Kos Elections	Safe R	November 4, 2014

==== Endorsements ====
Matt Salmon (R)

Organizations

- FreedomWorks
- National Federation of Independent Business
- No Labels
James Woods (D)

Organizations

- National Organization for Women

==== Results ====
Arizona’s 5th congressional district, 2014
Party	Candidate	Votes	%
Republican	Matt Salmon (incumbent)	124,867	69.6
Democratic	James Woods	54,596	30.4
Total votes		179,463	100.0
Republican hold			

== District 6 ==
2014 Arizona's 6th congressional district election
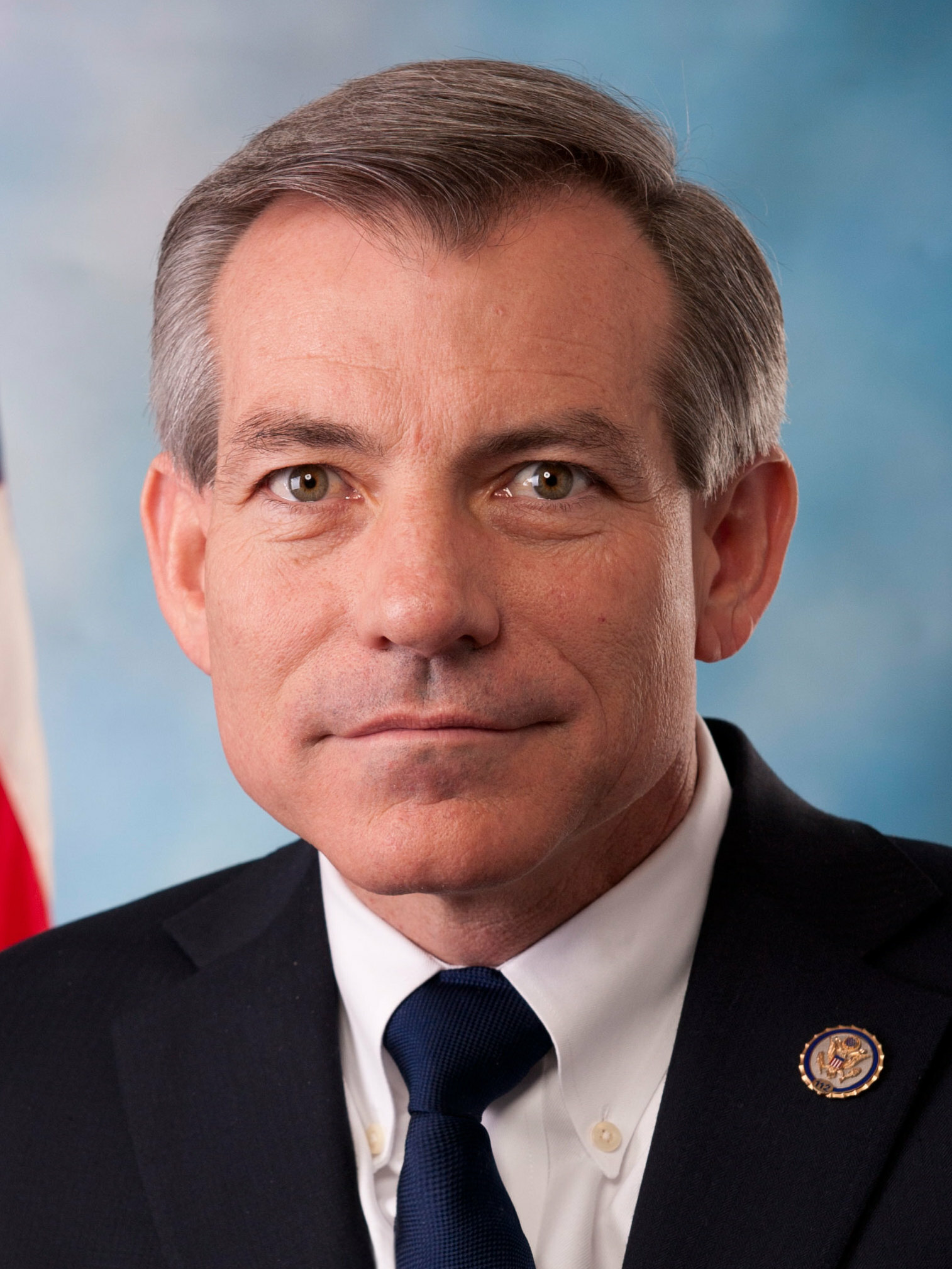

Nominee	David Schweikert	W. John Williamson
Party	Republican	Democratic
Popular vote	129,578	70,198
Percentage	64.9%	35.1%
- Precinct results Schweikert: 50–60% 60–70% 70–80% 80–90% Williamson: 50–60%
U.S. Representative before election
David Schweikert
Republican
Elected U.S. Representative
David Schweikert
Republican

Republican David Schweikert, who had represented the district since 2010, ran for re-election.

=== Republican primary ===
==== Candidates ====
===== Nominee =====
- David Schweikert, incumbent U.S. representative

==== Results ====
Republican primary results
Party	Candidate	Votes	%
Republican	David Schweikert (incumbent)	69,902	100.0
Total votes		69,902	100.0

=== Democratic primary ===
==== Candidates ====
===== Nominee =====
- W. John Williamson, candidate for this seat in 2012

==== Results ====
Democratic primary results
Party	Candidate	Votes	%
Democratic	W. John Williamson	25,306	100.0
Total votes		25,306	100.0

=== General election ===
==== Predictions ====
Source	Ranking	As of
The Cook Political Report	Safe R	November 3, 2014
Rothenberg	Safe R	October 24, 2014
Sabato's Crystal Ball	Safe R	October 30, 2014
RCP	Safe R	November 2, 2014
Daily Kos Elections	Safe R	November 4, 2014

==== Endorsements ====
David Schweikert (R)

Organizations

- National Federation of Independent Business

==== Results ====
Arizona’s 6th congressional district, 2014
Party	Candidate	Votes	%
Republican	David Schweikert (incumbent)	129,578	64.9
Democratic	W. John Williamson	70,198	35.1
Total votes		199,776	100.0
Republican hold			

== District 7 ==
2014 Arizona's 7th congressional district election
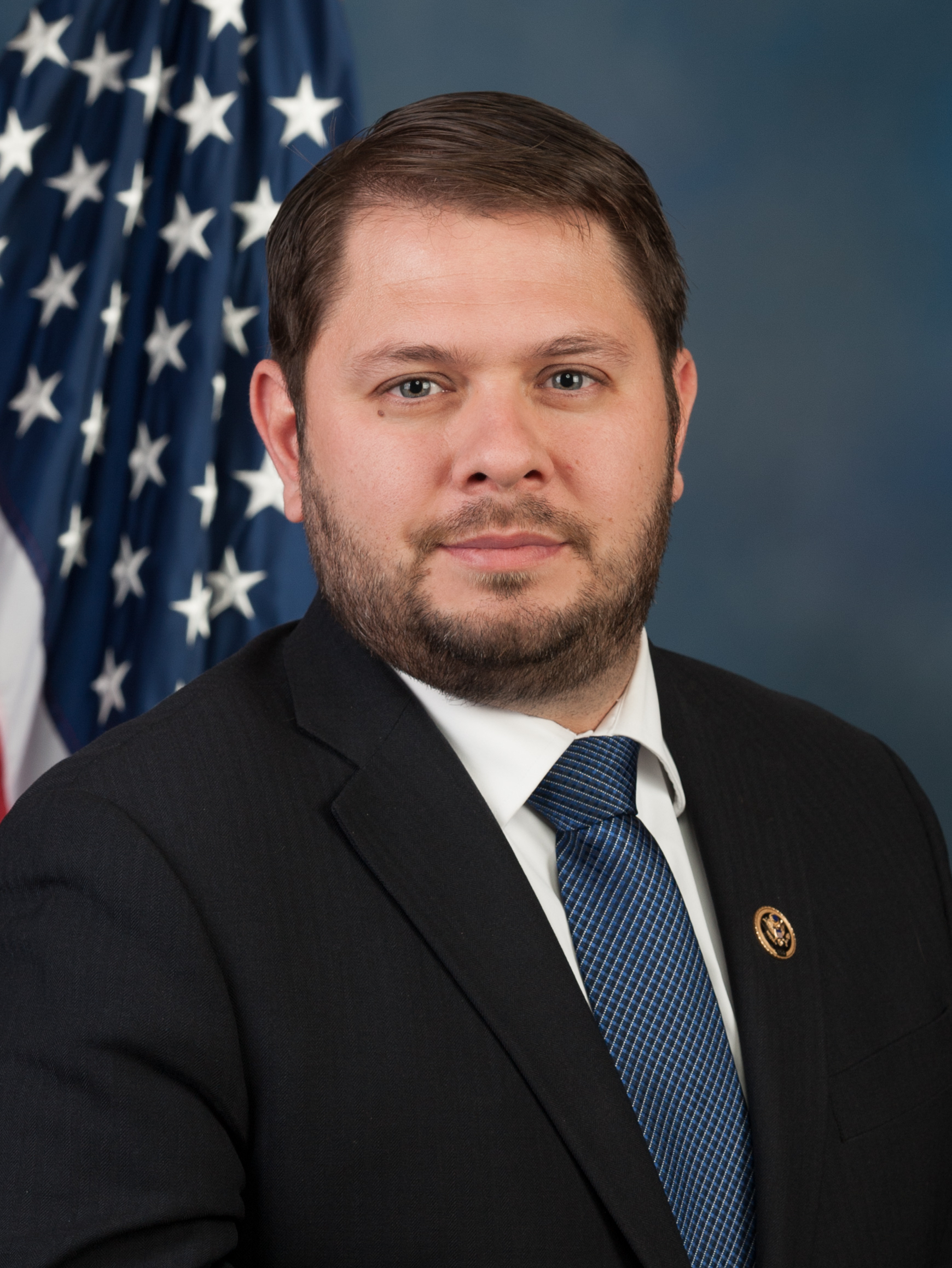

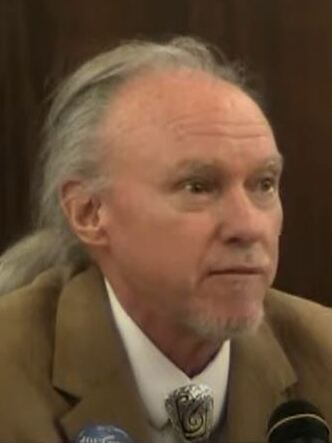

Nominee	Ruben Gallego	Joe Cobb	Rebecca DeWitt
Party	Democratic	Libertarian	Americans Elect
Popular vote	54,235	10,715	3,858
Percentage	74.9%	14.8%	5.3%
- County results Gallego: 70–80%
U.S. Representative before election
Ed Pastor
Democratic
Elected U.S. Representative
Ruben Gallego
Democratic

The 7th district is heavily Hispanic. It is located primarily in Phoenix, and includes portions of Glendale and the town of Guadalupe. The incumbent was Democrat Ed Pastor, who had represented the district since 2013, and previously represented the 4th district from 2003 to 2013 and the 2nd district from 1991 to 2013. He was re-elected with 82% of the vote in 2012 and the district has a PVI of D+16. Pastor did not run for re-election.

=== Democratic primary ===
Pastor's retirement presented a "once- or twice-in-a-lifetime opportunity" for an open safe Democratic seat in Arizona and was predicted to set off a "free-for-all" in the primary that could "eclipse" the 10-candidate primary for retiring Congressman John Shadegg's seat in 2010. Because of this and Arizona's "resign-to-run" law, political consultant Mario Diaz predicted a "domino effect, from federal (offices) all the way down to city (councils)."

==== Candidates ====
===== Nominee =====
- Ruben Gallego, former state representative

===== Eliminated in primary =====
- Randy Camacho
- Jarrett Maupin, pastor and activist
- Johnnie Robinson
- Mary Rose Wilcox, Maricopa County Supervisor

===== Withdrawn =====
- Steve Gallardo, state senator (running for Wilcox's place on the Maricopa County Board of Supervisors)

===== Disqualified =====
- Cesar Chavez, formerly Scott Fistler, Republican write-in candidate for this seat in 2012 and candidate for Phoenix City Council in 2013

===== Declined =====
- Chad Campbell, Minority Leader of the Arizona House of Representatives
- Ronnie Cho, former associate director of the White House Office of Public Engagement and Intergovernmental Affairs
- Phil Gordon, former mayor of Phoenix
- Catherine Miranda, state representative
- Michael Nowakowski, Phoenix City Councilman
- Ed Pastor, incumbent U.S. representative
- Laura Pastor, Phoenix City Councilwoman and daughter of Ed Pastor
- Marie Lopez Rogers, mayor of Avondale
- Kyrsten Sinema, U.S. representative (running for re-election in the 9th district)
- Greg Stanton, mayor of Phoenix
- Anna Tovar, Minority Leader of the Arizona Senate
- Daniel Valenzuela, Phoenix City Councilman

==== Endorsements ====
Ruben Gallego

U.S. representatives

- Raúl Grijalva, incumbent U.S. representative from the 3rd district
- Harry Mitchell, former U.S. representative from the 5th district
Mary Rose Wilcox

U.S. representatives

- Ed Pastor, incumbent U.S. representative from the 7th district

Organizations

- EMILY's List
- U.S. Women's Chamber of Commerce

==== Polling ====
Poll source	Date(s) administered	Sample size	Margin of error	Ruben Gallego	Mary Rose Wilcox	Other	Undecided
Public Policy Polling	July 22–24, 2014	500	± 4.4%	41%	31%	—	27%
Lake Research (D-Gallego)	July 20–22, 2014	400	± 4.9%	32%	24%	6%	38%
Lake Research (D-Gallego)	May 20–22, 2014	401	± 4.9%	38%	32%	—	29%

==== Debate ====
2014 Arizona's 7th congressional district democratic primary debate
No.	Date	Host	Moderator	Link	Democratic	Democratic	Democratic	Democratic
Key: P Participant A Absent N Not invited I Invited W Withdrawn								
Key: P Participant A Absent N Not invited I Invited W Withdrawn					Randy Camacho	Ruben Gallego	Jarrett Maupin	Mary Rose Wilcox
1	Jul. 16, 2014	Arizona PBS	Ted Simons	PBS	P	P	P	P

==== Results ====
Democratic primary results by precinct: Gallego: 40–50%; 50–60%; 60–70%; 90–100%; Wilcox: 40–50%; 50–60%; Camacho: 30–40%

Democratic primary results
Party	Candidate	Votes	%
Democratic	Ruben Gallego	14,936	48.9
Democratic	Mary Rose Wilcox	11,077	36.3
Democratic	Randy Camacho	2,330	7.6
Democratic	Jarrett Maupin	2,199	7.2
Total votes		30,542	100.0

=== Republican primary ===
==== Candidates ====
===== Withdrawn =====
- Brianna Wasserman

==== Results ====
Republican primary results
Party	Candidate	Votes	%
Republican	Write-ins	1,125	100.0

=== Libertarian primary ===
==== Candidates ====
===== Nominee =====
- Joe Cobb, retired economist and nominee for this seat in 2008, 2010 & 2012

===== Withdrawn =====
- Ted Rogers

==== Results ====
Libertarian primary results
Party	Candidate	Votes	%
Libertarian	Joe Cobb	300	100.0
Total votes		300	100.0

=== Americans Elect primary ===
==== Candidates ====
===== Nominee =====
- Rebecca DeWitt, accountant, Green nominee for this seat in 2008 & 2010 and Democratic candidate for this seat in 2012

===== Withdrawn =====
- Ted Rogers

==== Results ====
Americans Elect primary results
Party	Candidate	Votes	%
Americans Elect	Rebecca DeWitt (write-in)	4	100.0
Total votes		4	100.0

=== General election ===
==== Debate ====
2014 Arizona's 7th congressional district debate
No.	Date	Host	Moderator	Link	Democratic	Libertarian	Independent
Key: P Participant A Absent N Not invited I Invited W Withdrawn							
Key: P Participant A Absent N Not invited I Invited W Withdrawn					Ruben Gallego	Joe Cobb	José Peñalosa
1	Oct. 7, 2014	Arizona PBS	Ted Simons	PBS	P	P	P

==== Predictions ====
Source	Ranking	As of
The Cook Political Report	Safe D	November 3, 2014
Rothenberg	Safe D	October 24, 2014
Sabato's Crystal Ball	Safe D	October 30, 2014
RCP	Safe D	November 2, 2014
Daily Kos Elections	Safe D	November 4, 2014

==== Endorsements ====
Ruben Gallego (D)

U.S. representatives

- Raúl Grijalva, incumbent U.S. representative from the 3rd district
- Harry Mitchell, former U.S. representative from the 5th district

Labor unions

- AFL-CIO
- International Brotherhood of Boilermakers
- National Association of Letter Carriers

Organizations

- Human Rights Campaign
- National Organization for Women
- Progressive Change Campaign Committee
- Sierra Club
- VoteVets

==== Results ====
Arizona’s 7th congressional district, 2014
Party	Candidate	Votes	%
Democratic	Ruben Gallego	54,235	74.9
Libertarian	Joe Cobb	10,715	14.8
Americans Elect	Rebecca Dewitt	3,858	5.3
Independent	José Peñalosa	3,496	4.8
Republican	Gary Dunn (write-in)	129	0.2
Democratic	Gustavo Ortega (write-in)	17	0.0
Independent	Samuel Esquivel (write-in)	4	0.0
Total votes		72,454	100.0
Democratic hold			

== District 8 ==
2014 Arizona's 8th congressional district election
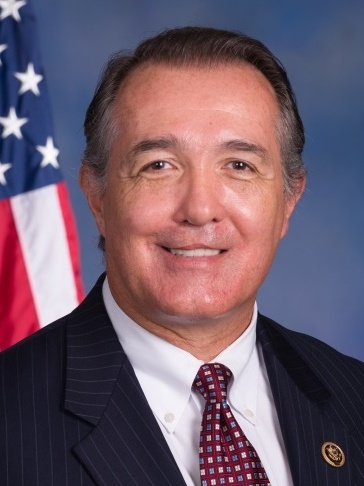

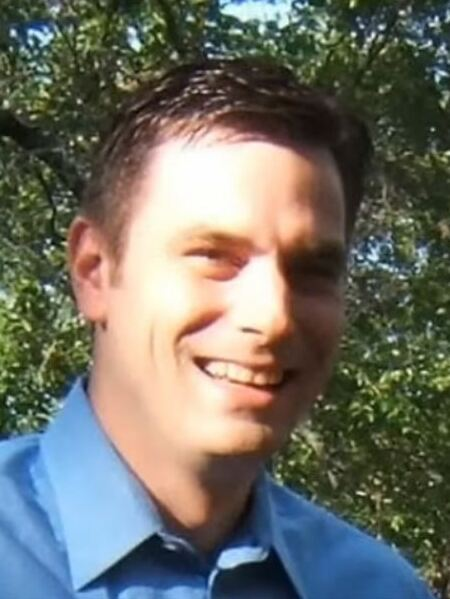
Nominee	Trent Franks	Stephen Dolgos
Party	Republican	Americans Elect
Popular vote	128,710	41,066
Percentage	75.8%	24.2%
- County results Franks: 70–80%
U.S. Representative before election
Trent Franks
Republican
Elected U.S. Representative
Trent Franks
Republican

Republican Trent Franks, who had represented the district since 2002, ran for re-election.

=== Republican primary ===
==== Candidates ====
===== Nominee =====
- Trent Franks, incumbent U.S. representative

===== Eliminated in primary =====
- Clair Van Steenwyk, radio host

==== Results ====
Republican primary results
Party	Candidate	Votes	%
Republican	Trent Franks (incumbent)	53,771	73.3
Republican	Clair Van Steenwyk	19,629	26.7
Total votes		73,400	100.0

=== Democratic primary ===
No Democrat filed to run.

=== Americans Elect primary ===
==== Candidates ====
===== Nominee =====
- Stephen Dolgos, financial advisor and nominee for this seat in 2012

==== Results ====
Americans Elect primary results
Party	Candidate	Votes	%
Americans Elect	Stephen Dolgos (write-in)	2	100.0

=== General election ===
==== Predictions ====
Source	Ranking	As of
The Cook Political Report	Safe R	November 3, 2014
Rothenberg	Safe R	October 24, 2014
Sabato's Crystal Ball	Safe R	October 30, 2014
RCP	Safe R	November 2, 2014
Daily Kos Elections	Safe R	November 4, 2014

==== Endorsements ====
Trent Franks (R)

Organizations

- National Federation of Independent Business

==== Results ====
Arizona’s 8th congressional district, 2014
Party	Candidate	Votes	%
Republican	Trent Franks (incumbent)	128,710	75.8
Americans Elect	Stephen Dolgos	41,066	24.2
Total votes		169,776	100.0
Republican hold			

== District 9 ==
2014 Arizona's 9th congressional district election
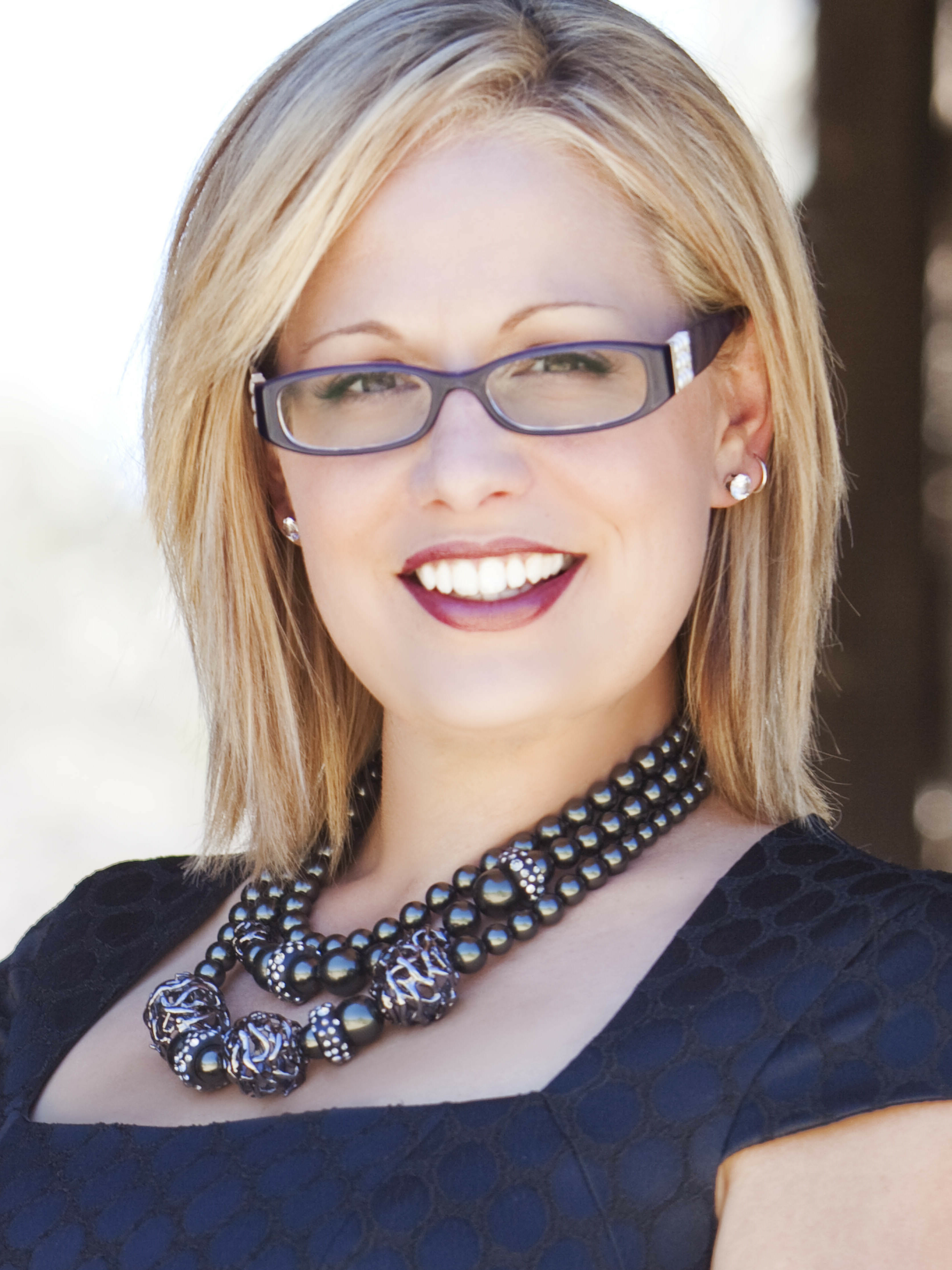

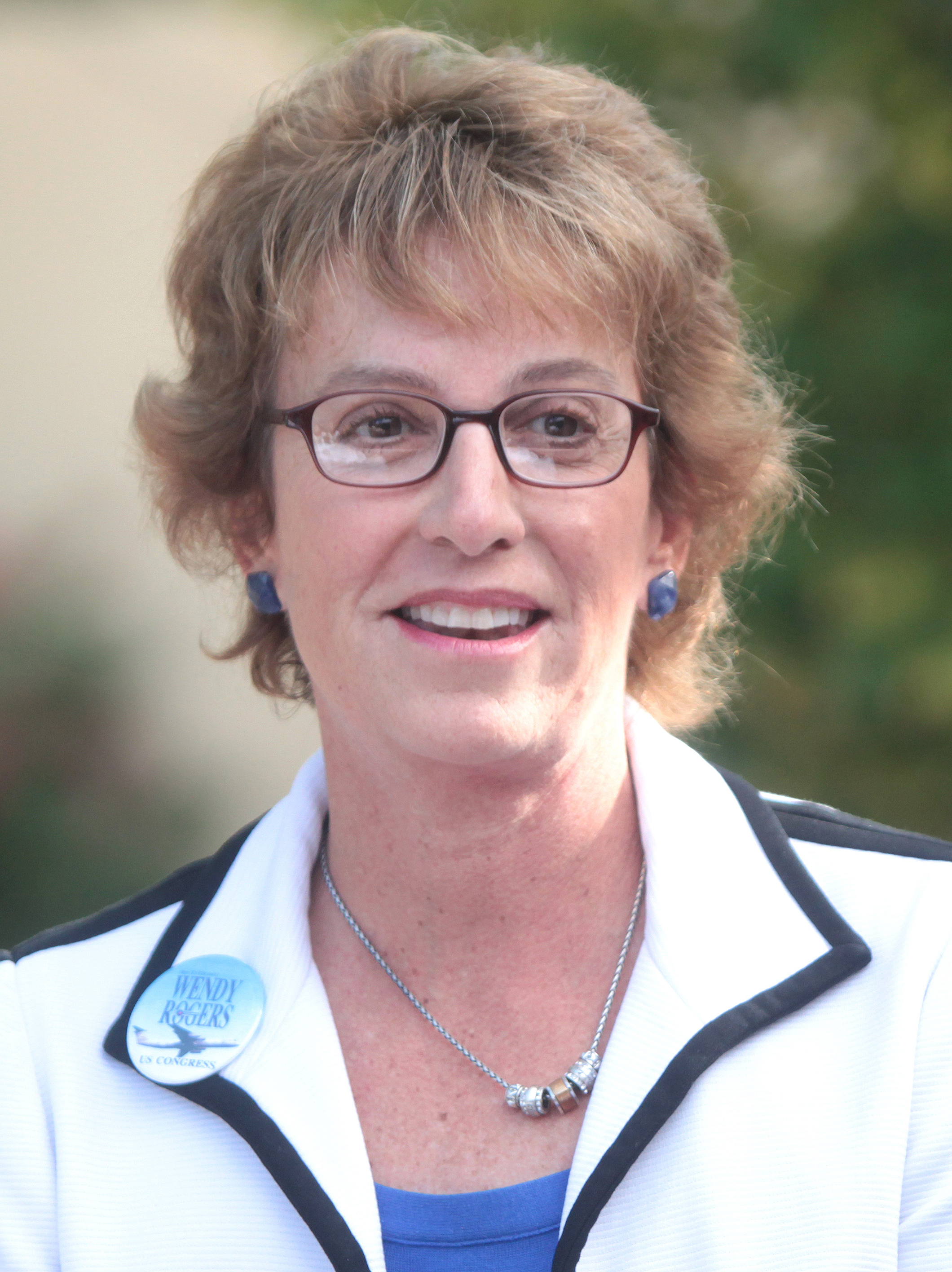
Nominee	Kyrsten Sinema	Wendy Rogers
Party	Democratic	Republican
Popular vote	88,609	67,841
Percentage	54.7%	41.9%
- Precinct results Sinema: 40–50% 50–60% 60–70% 70–80% Rogers: 40–50% 50–60% 60–70%
U.S. Representative before election
Kyrsten Sinema
Democratic
Elected U.S. Representative
Kyrsten Sinema
Democratic

Democrat Kyrsten Sinema won election to the House of Representatives in 2012, when the district was created.

=== Democratic primary ===
==== Candidates ====
===== Nominee =====
- Kyrsten Sinema, incumbent U.S. representative

==== Results ====
Democratic primary results
Party	Candidate	Votes	%
Democratic	Kyrsten Sinema (incumbent)	31,900	100.0
Total votes		31,900	100.0

=== Republican primary ===
==== Candidates ====
===== Nominee =====
- Wendy Rogers, retired United States Air Force Lieutenant Colonel

===== Eliminated in primary =====
- Andrew Walter, businessman and retired American football player

===== Withdrawn =====
- Vernon Parker, former mayor of Paradise Valley and nominee for this seat in 2012 (running for Arizona Corporation Commissioner)

===== Declined =====
- Ben Quayle, former U.S. representative
- Martin Sepulveda, businessman and candidate for this seat in 2012

==== Polling ====
Poll source	Date(s) administered	Sample size	Margin of error	Wendy Rogers	Andrew Walter	Undecided
Coleman Dahm & Associates	February 2014	686	–	15%	7%	78%

==== Debate ====
2014 Arizona's 9th congressional district republican primary debate
No.	Date	Host	Moderator	Link	Republican	Republican
Key: P Participant A Absent N Not invited I Invited W Withdrawn						
Key: P Participant A Absent N Not invited I Invited W Withdrawn					Wendy Rogers	Andrew Walter
1	Jul. 30, 2014	Arizona PBS	Ted Simons	PBS	P	P

==== Results ====
Republican primary results
Party	Candidate	Votes	%
Republican	Wendy Rogers	30,484	60.6
Republican	Andrew Walter	19,808	39.4
Total votes		50,292	100.0

=== Libertarian primary ===
==== Candidates ====
===== Nominee =====
- Powell Gammill

==== Results ====
Libertarian primary results
Party	Candidate	Votes	%
Libertarian	Powell Gammill (write-in)	52	100.0
Total votes		52	100.0

=== General election ===
==== Endorsements ====
Kyrsten Sinema (D)

Labor unions

- AFL-CIO
- International Brotherhood of Boilermakers
- National Association of Letter Carriers

Organizations

- BIPAC
- Democratic Congressional Campaign Committee "Frontline" Program
- EMILY's List
- Human Rights Campaign
- National Organization for Women
- No Labels
- Sierra Club
- United States Chamber of Commerce
- U.S. Women's Chamber of Commerce

Newspapers

- Arizona Republic
Wendy Rogers (R)

Organizations

- National Republican Congressional Committee "Young Guns" Program
- Susan B. Anthony List

==== Predictions ====
Source	Ranking	As of
The Cook Political Report	Lean D	November 3, 2014
Rothenberg	Likely D	October 24, 2014
Sabato's Crystal Ball	Likely D	October 30, 2014
RCP	Likely D	November 2, 2014
Daily Kos Elections	Lean D	November 4, 2014

==== Results ====
Arizona’s 9th congressional district, 2014
Party	Candidate	Votes	%
Democratic	Kyrsten Sinema (incumbent)	88,609	54.7
Republican	Wendy Rogers	67,841	41.9
Libertarian	Powell Gammill	5,612	3.4
Total votes		162,062	100.0
Democratic hold			

== See also ==
- 2014 United States House of Representatives elections
- 2014 United States elections
