= 2016 United States presidential election in Arizona =

- November 8, 2016
- Turnout: 74.2% ▲

Nominee	Donald Trump	Hillary Clinton
Party	Republican	Democratic
Home state	New York	New York
Running mate	Mike Pence	Tim Kaine
Electoral vote	11	0
Popular vote	1,252,401	1,161,167
Percentage	48.67%	45.13%

Trump
40–50%
50–60%
60–70%
70–80%
80–90%
90–100%
Clinton
40–50%
50–60%
60–70%
70–80%
80–90%
90–100%
No Data
President before election
Barack Obama
Democratic
Elected President
Donald Trump
Republican

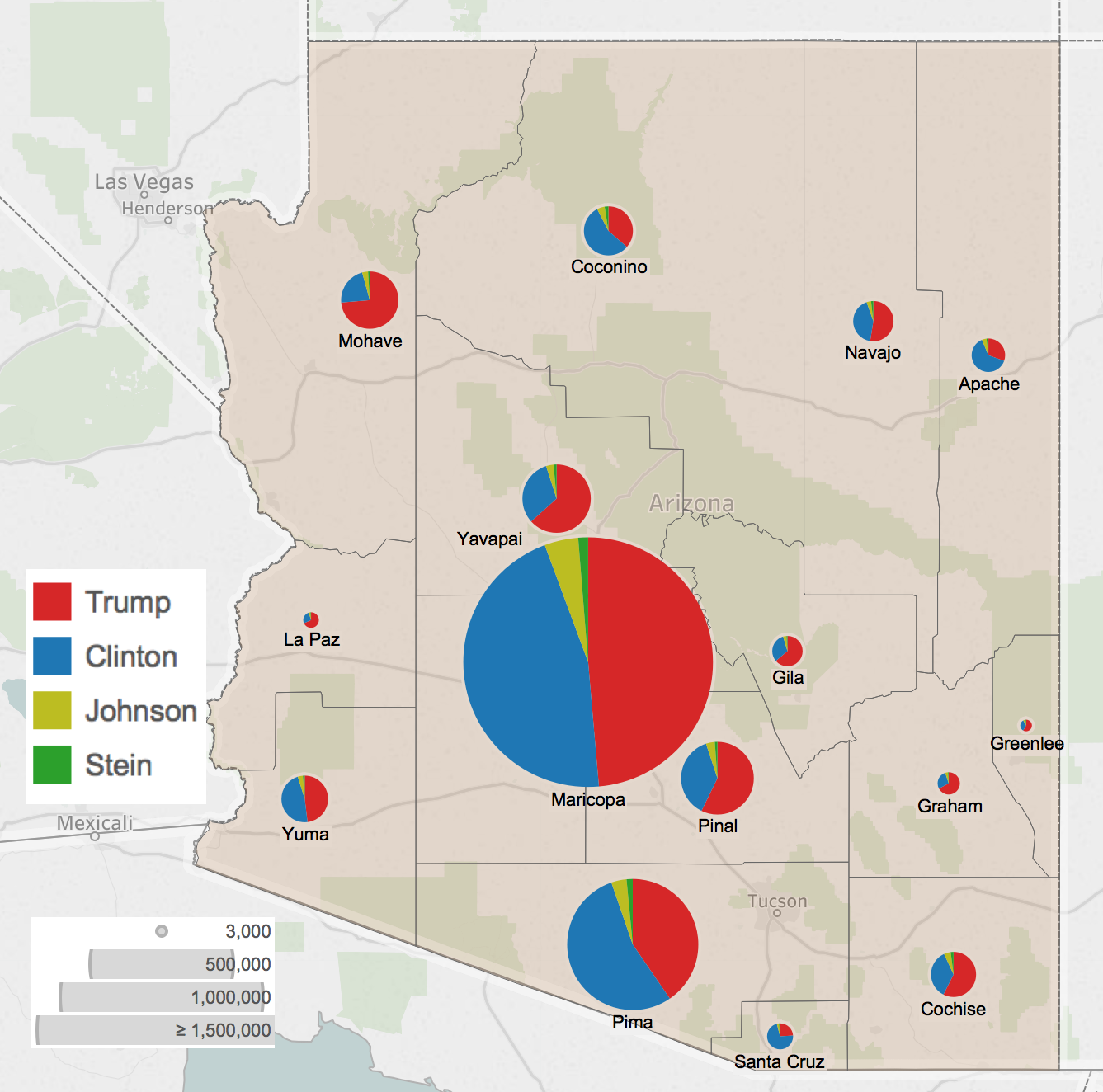
Results by county showing number of votes by size, and candidates by color

Treemap of the popular vote by county

The 2016 United States presidential election in Arizona was held on Tuesday, November 8, 2016, as part of the 2016 United States presidential election in which all 50 states plus the District of Columbia participated. Arizona voters chose electors to represent them in the Electoral College via a popular vote, pitting the Republican nominee, businessman Donald Trump, and running mate Indiana Governor Mike Pence against Democratic nominee, former Secretary of State Hillary Clinton, and her running mate Virginia Senator Tim Kaine. Arizona has 11 electoral votes in the Electoral College.

Despite the country at-large swinging to the right, Arizona's Republican margin of victory decreased from 9.0% in 2012 to only 3.5% in 2016, thus making it one of 11 states (along with the District of Columbia) to swing toward the Democratic Party in this election.

As of 2024, Trump's 2016 margin of victory in Arizona remains the smallest for any Republican who won the presidency since Arizona's statehood in 1912.

Notably, Maricopa County, the state's most populous county, went more Democratic than the state as a whole for the first time in state history; it has done so in every election since. The county had not voted for a Democrat since Harry S. Truman in 1948. Maricopa County and Arizona as a whole both voted Democratic in 2020 and then flipped back to the Republican presidential column in 2024.

== Primary elections ==
=== Democratic primary ===
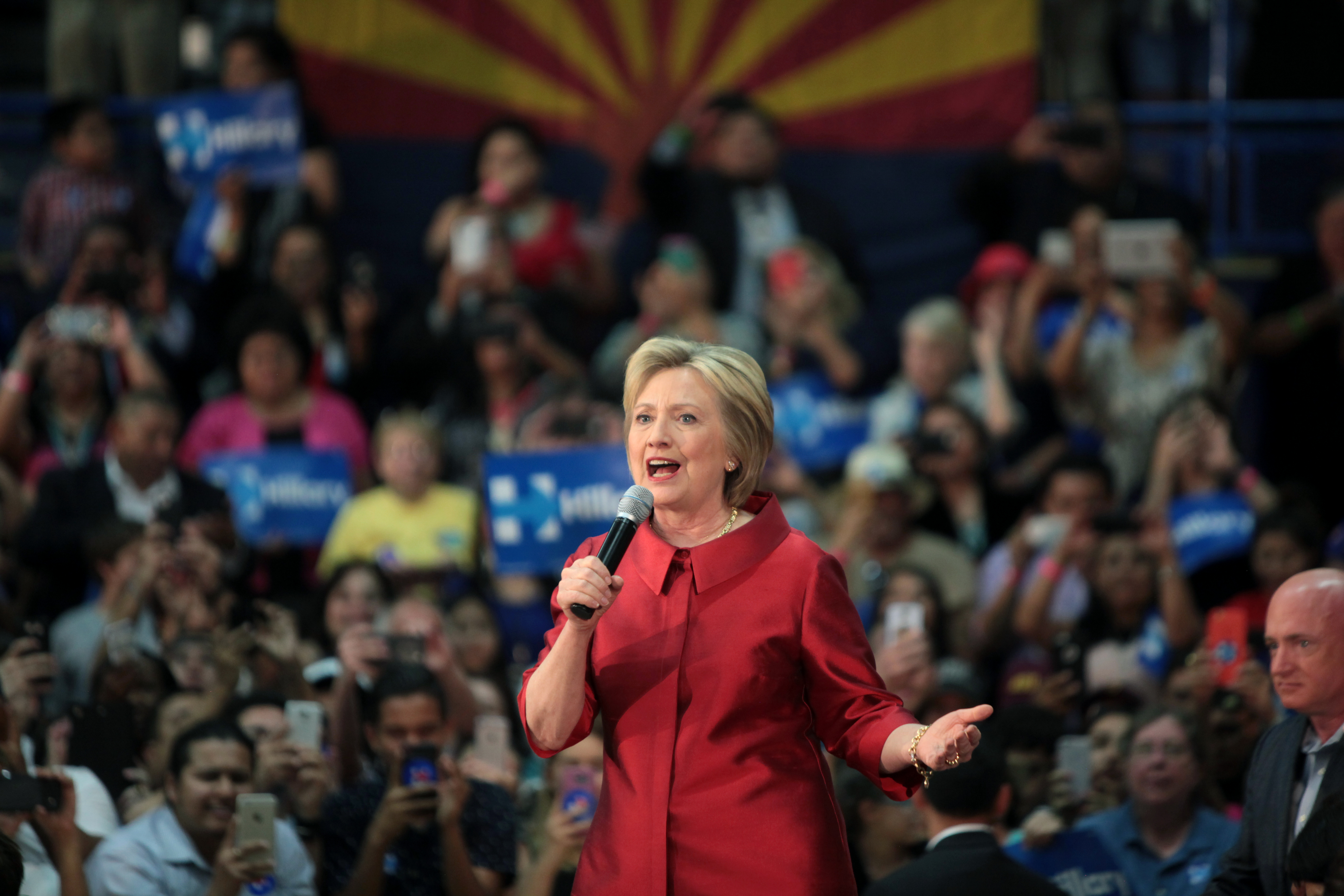
Former Secretary of State Hillary Clinton at a campaign rally at Carl Hayden High School in Phoenix on March 21, 2016.

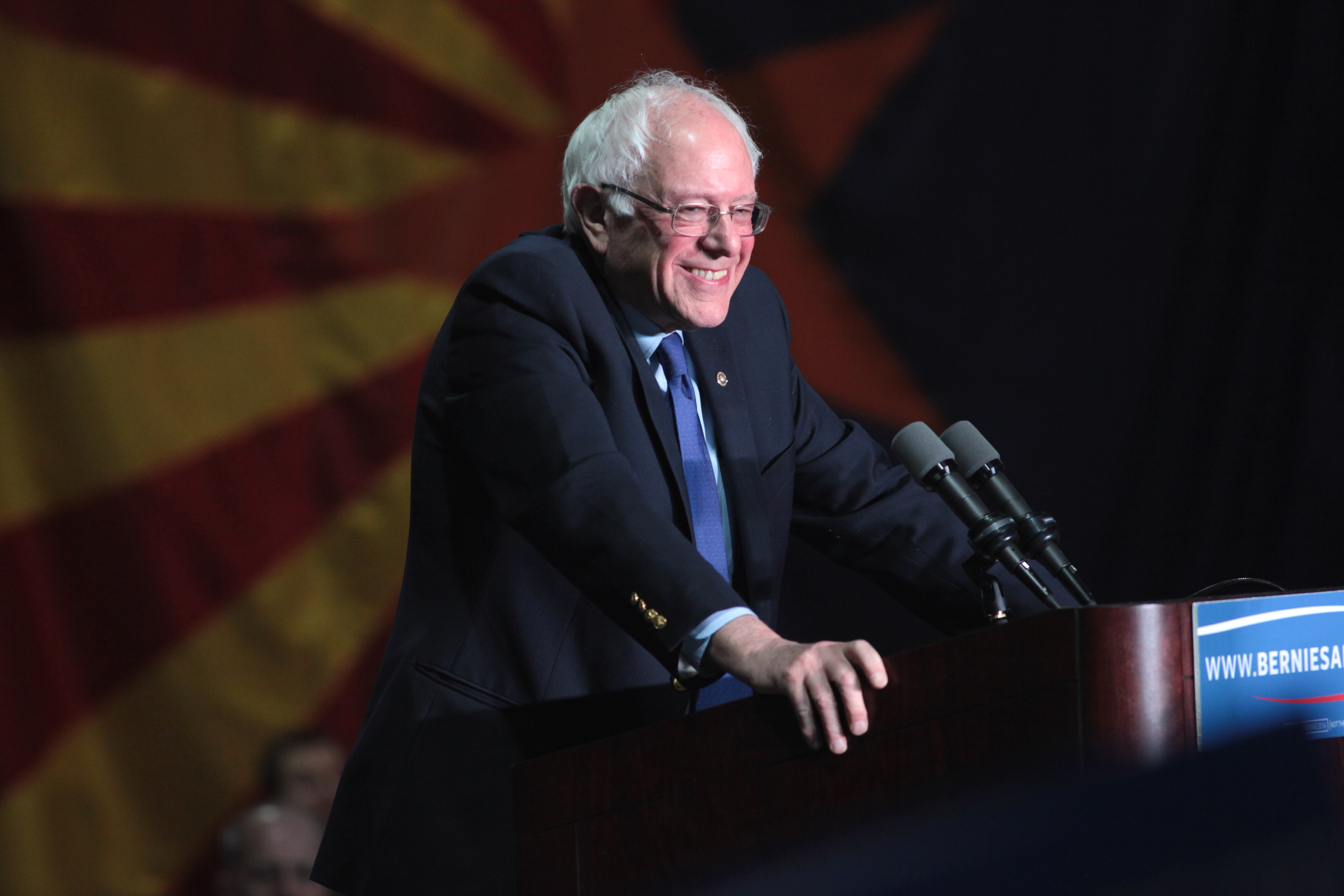
Senator Bernie Sanders at a campaign rally at the Phoenix Convention Center in Phoenix on March 15, 2016.

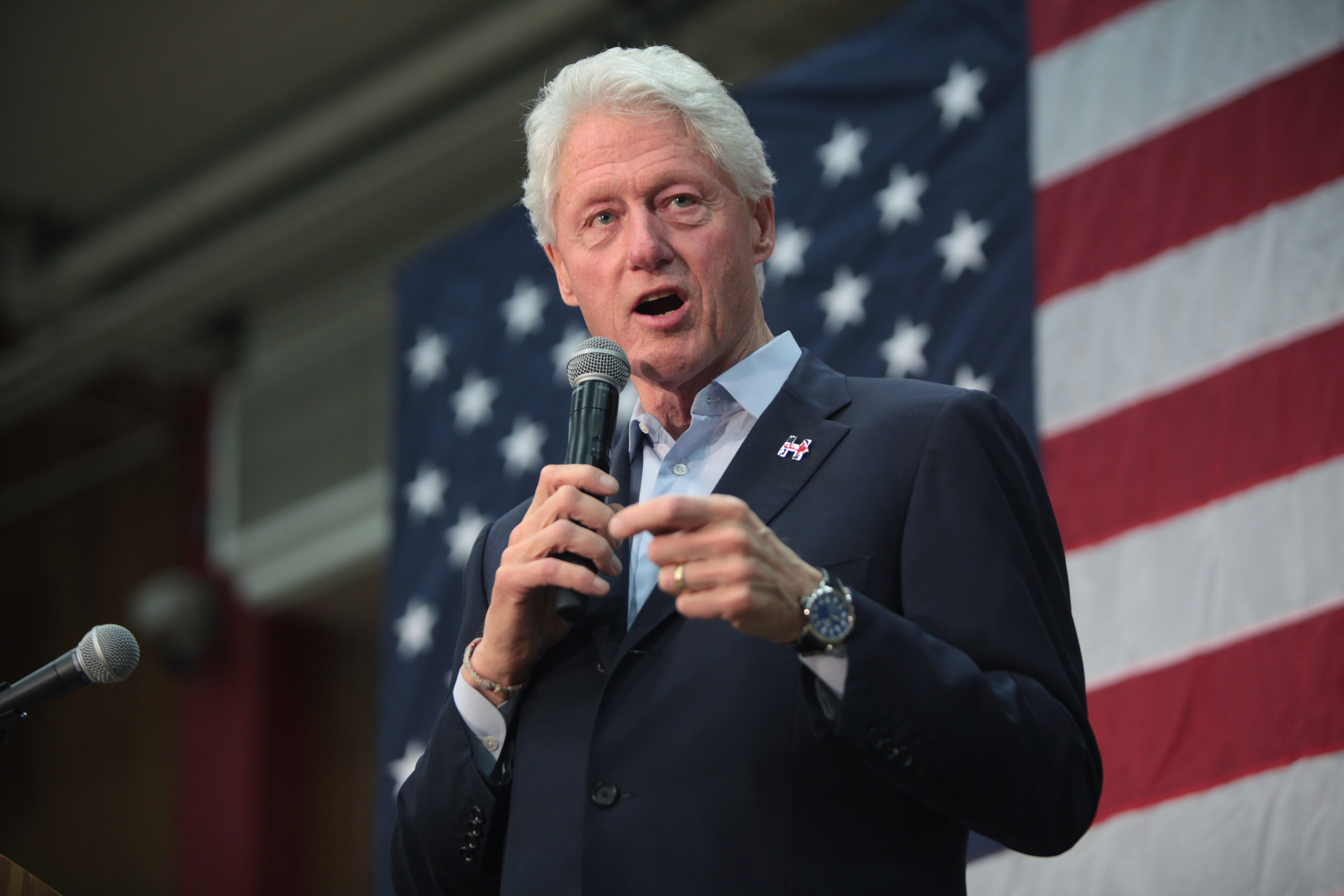
Former President Bill Clinton at a campaign rally for his wife at Central High School in Phoenix on March 20, 2016.

Six candidates appeared on the Democratic presidential primary ballot:

- Bernie Sanders
- Hillary Clinton
- Rocky De La Fuente
- Martin O'Malley (withdrawn)
- Henry Hewes
- Michael Steinberg

==== Results ====
2016 Democratic Party's presidential nominating process in Arizona – Summary of results –
Candidate	Popular vote		Estimated delegates		
Candidate	Count	Percentage	Pledged	Unpledged	Total
Hillary Clinton	262,459	56.3%	42	6	48
Bernie Sanders	192,962	41.4%	33	1	34
Martin O'Malley (withdrawn)	3,877	0.8%			
Roque "Rocky" De La Fuente	2,797	0.6%			
Michael Steinberg	2,295	0.5%			
Henry Hewes	1,845	0.4%			
Uncommitted	—N/a			3	3
Total	466,235	100%	75	10	85

Detailed results per congressional district

Detailed results for the Arizona Democratic primary, April 5, 2016
District	Total		Hillary Clinton			Bernie Sanders		
District	Votes	Delegates	Votes	%	Delegates	Votes	%	Delegates
1st district	63,863	6	35,445	55.5%	3	26,267	41.1%	3
2nd district	78,237	8	42,797	54.7%	4	33,891	43.3%	4
3rd district	51,520	5	30,298	58.8%	3	20,091	39.0%	2
4th district	37,273	4	15,289	55.4%	2	20,662	41.0%	2
5th district	40,847	5	22,973	56.2%	3	16,982	41.6%	2
6th district	50,465	6	29,266	58.0%	4	20,259	40.1%	2
7th district	42,199	5	24,245	57.5%	3	17,173	40.7%	2
8th district	46,491	5	27,672	59.5%	3	17,651	38.0%	2
9th district	55,340	6	29,101	52.6%	3	25,359	45.8%	3
At-large delegates	466,235	16	262,459	56.3%	9	192,962	41.4%	7
Pledged PLEOs	466,235	9	262,459	56.3%	5	192,962	41.4%	4
Total	466,235	75	262,464	56.3%	42	192,965	41.4%	33

=== Republican primary ===
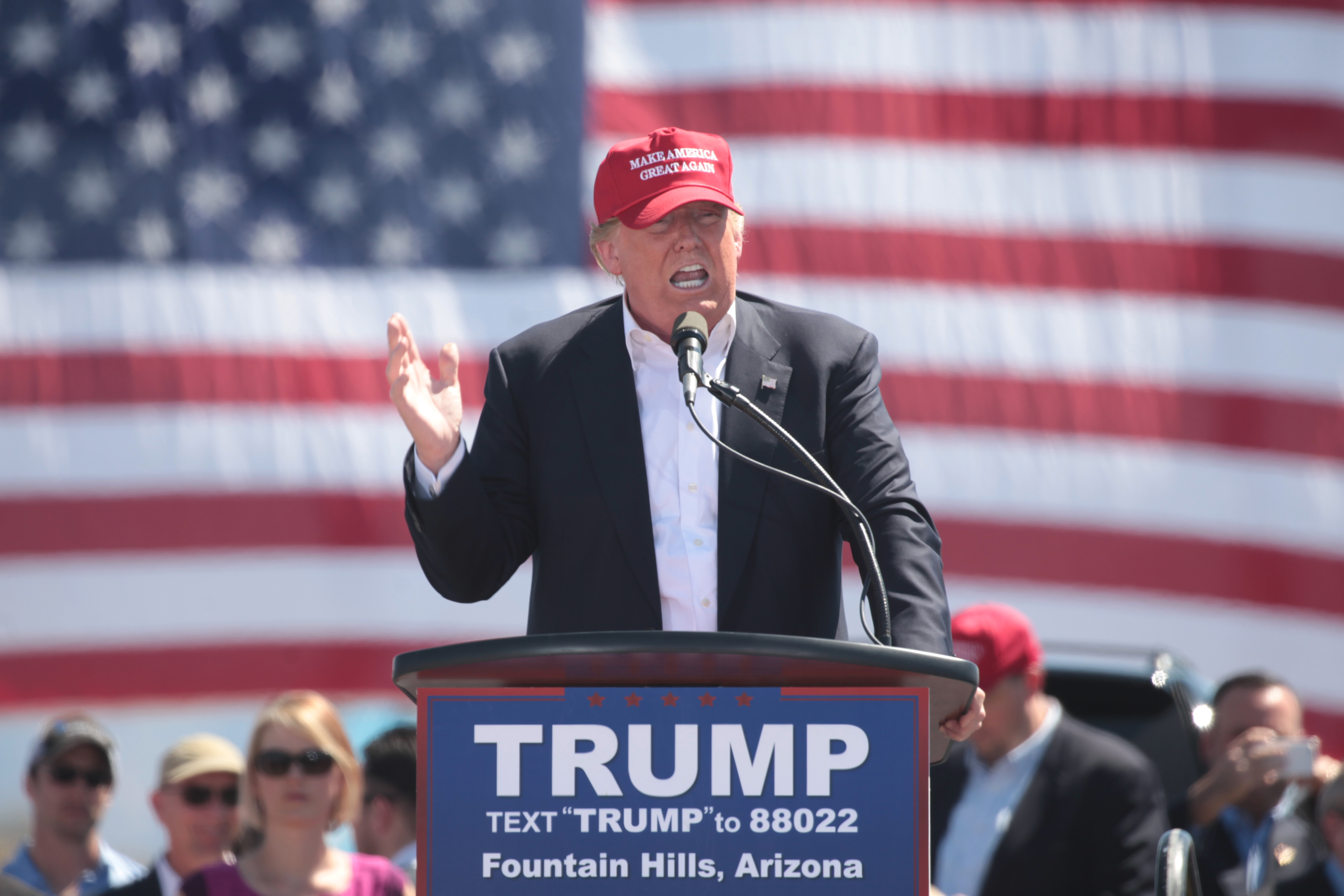
Businessman Donald Trump at a campaign rally at Fountain Park in Fountain Hills on March 19, 2016.

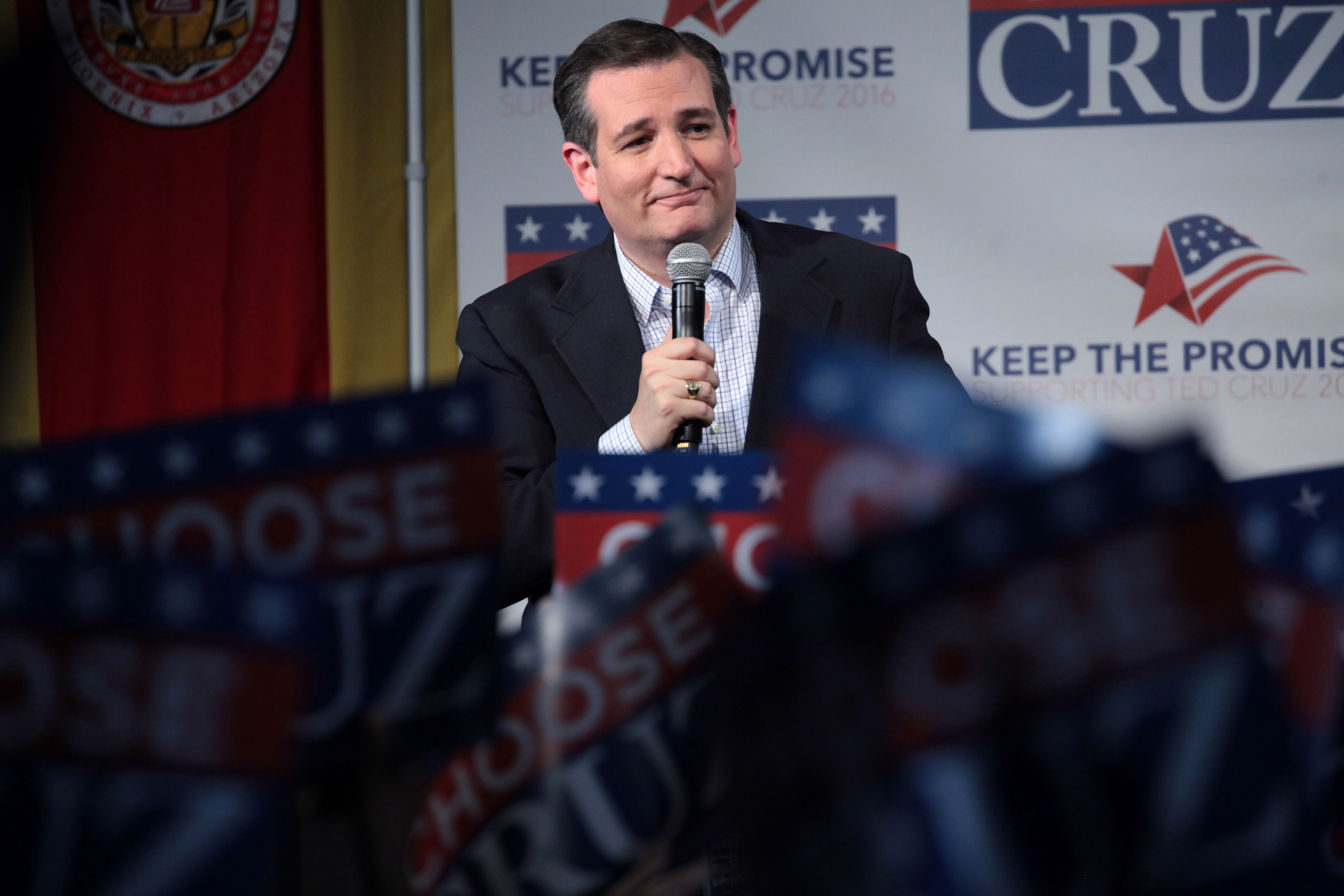
Senator Ted Cruz at a campaign rally at Arizona Christian University in Phoenix on March 18, 2016.

Fourteen candidates appeared on the Republican presidential primary ballot:

- Jeb Bush (withdrawn)
- Ben Carson (withdrawn)
- Chris Christie (withdrawn)
- Ted Cruz
- Carly Fiorina (withdrawn)
- Lindsey Graham (withdrawn)
- Mike Huckabee (withdrawn)
- John Kasich
- George Pataki (withdrawn)
- Rand Paul (withdrawn)
- Marco Rubio (withdrawn)
- Rick Santorum (withdrawn)
- Tim Cook
- Donald Trump

Arizona Republican primary, March 22, 2016
Candidate	Votes	Percentage	Actual delegate count		
Candidate	Votes	Percentage	Bound	Unbound	Total
Donald Trump	286,743	45.95%	58	0	58
Ted Cruz	172,294	27.61%	0	0	0
Marco Rubio (withdrawn)	72,304	11.59%	0	0	0
John Kasich	65,965	10.57%	0	0	0
Ben Carson (withdrawn)	14,940	2.39%	0	0	0
Jeb Bush (withdrawn)	4,393	0.70%	0	0	0
Rand Paul (withdrawn)	2,269	0.36%	0	0	0
Mike Huckabee (withdrawn)	1,300	0.21%	0	0	0
Carly Fiorina (withdrawn)	1,270	0.20%	0	0	0
Chris Christie (withdrawn)	988	0.16%	0	0	0
Rick Santorum (withdrawn)	523	0.08%	0	0	0
Lindsey Graham (withdrawn)	498	0.08%	0	0	0
George Pataki (withdrawn)	309	0.05%	0	0	0
Timothy Cook	243	0.04%	0	0	0
Unprojected delegates:			0	0	0
Total:	624,039	100.00%	58	0	58
Source: The Green Papers

=== Green primary ===
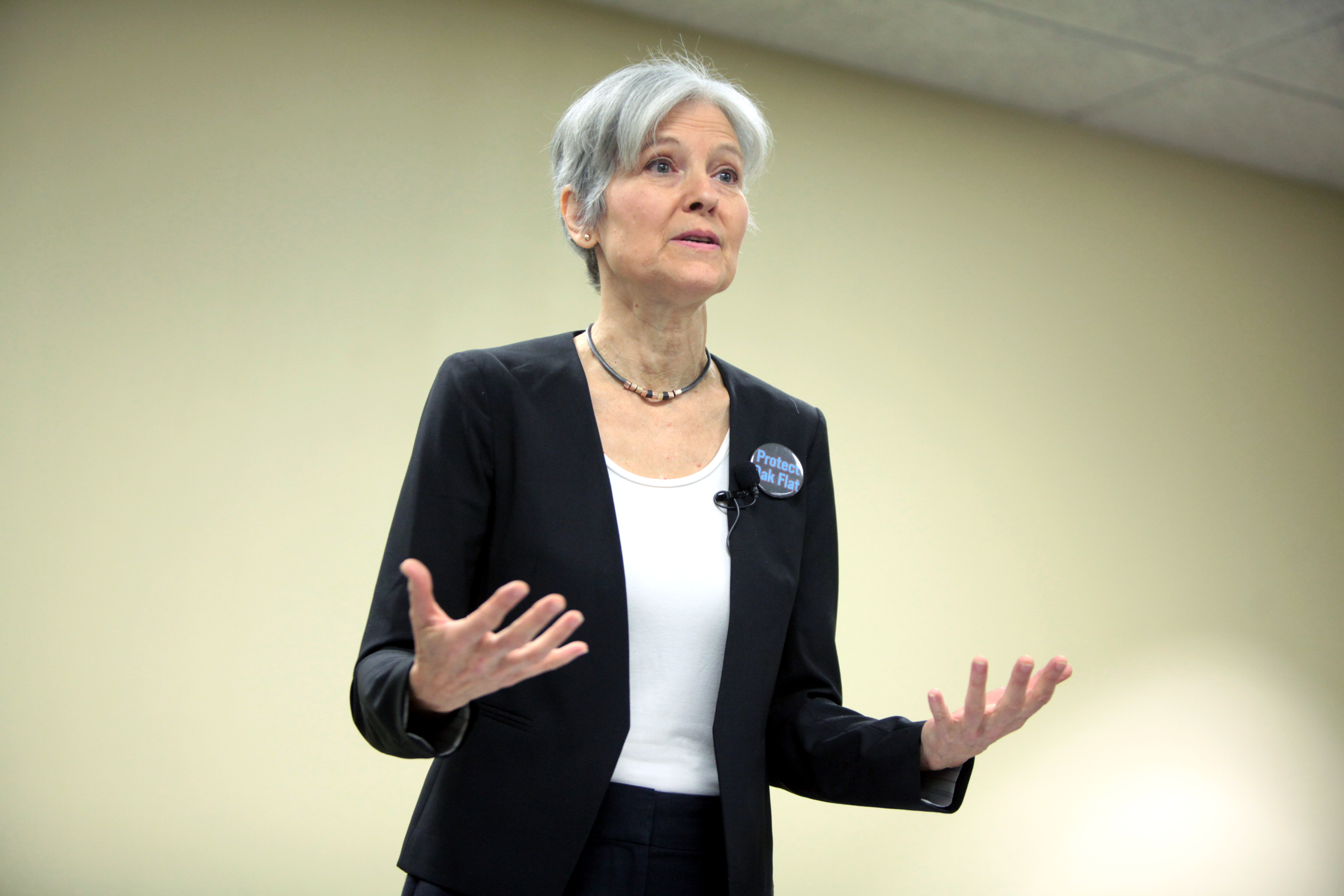
Green Party candidate Jill Stein at a campaign rally at the Mesa Public Library in Mesa on March 12, 2016.

The Arizona Green Party held its primary on March 22. Jill Stein won with 82% of the vote, and the overall number of voters that took place in the primary saw an increase from 561 in 2012 to 770 in 2016. Only two candidates qualified for the primary:

Arizona Green Party presidential primary, March 22, 2016
Candidate	Votes	Percentage	National delegates
Jill Stein	666	82%	5
Kent Mesplay	151	18%	1
Write-in/Blank	18	0%	-
Total	817	100.0%	6

== General election ==
=== Polling ===
The first poll conducted in March 2016 showed a tie between Clinton and Trump. From March 2016 to October, the polling in this normally Republican state was quite close, with neither candidate seriously leading. In late October, Trump gained momentum and won every pre-election poll in the weeks leading up to the election. The final poll showed Trump leading Clinton 46% to 41% and the average of the final 3 polls showed Trump leading 47% to 43%, which was accurate compared to the results.

=== Predictions ===
The following are final 2016 predictions from various organizations for Arizona as of Election Day.

Source	Ranking	As of
Los Angeles Times	Lean D (flip)	November 6, 2016
Rothenberg Political Report	Tilt R	November 7, 2016
Sabato's Crystal Ball	Lean R	November 7, 2016
CNN	Tossup	November 8, 2016
NBC	Tossup	November 8, 2016
RealClearPolitics	Tossup	November 8, 2016
Fox News	Lean R	November 7, 2016
ABC	Tossup	November 7, 2016

=== Results ===
2016 United States presidential election in Arizona
Party	Candidate	Running mate	Popular vote		Electoral vote		Swing
Party	Candidate	Running mate	Count	%	Count	%	Swing
Republican	Donald Trump of New York	Mike Pence of Indiana	1,252,401	48.67%	11	100.0%	▼5.4%
Democratic	Hillary Clinton of New York	Tim Kaine of Virginia	1,161,167	45.13%	0	0.0%	▲0.1%
Libertarian	Gary Johnson of New Mexico	Bill Weld of Massachusetts	106,327	4.13%	0	0.0%	▲2.7%
Green	Jill Stein of Massachusetts	Ajamu Baraka of Illinois	34,345	1.33%	0	0.0%	▲1.0%
Independent	Evan McMullin (write-in) of Utah	Nathan Johnson of California	17,449	0.68%	0	0.0%	▲0.7%
Constitution	Darrell L. Castle (write-in) of Tennessee	Scott N. Bradley of Utah	1,058	0.04%	0	0.0%	▲0.0%
Independent	Tom Hoefling (write-in) of Iowa	Steve Schulin of South Carolina	85	0.00%	0	0.0%	Steady
Independent	Mike Smith (write-in) of Tennessee	Daniel L. White of Texas	62	0.00%	0	0.0%	Steady
Independent	Laurence Kotlikoff (write-in) of Massachusetts	Edward E. Leamer of California	52	0.00%	0	0.0%	Steady
Reform	Rocky De La Fuente (write-in) of California	Michael Steinberg of Florida	29	0.00%	0	0.0%	Steady
Independent	Joseph Allen Maldonado (write-in) of Oklahoma	Douglas Terranova of Texas	20	0.00%	0	0.0%	Steady
Total			2,604,657	100.0%	11	100.0%	

==== By county ====
County	Donald Trump Republican		Hillary Clinton Democratic		Various candidates Other parties		Margin		Total
County	#	%	#	%	#	%	#	%	Total
Apache	8,240	29.79%	17,083	61.76%	2,338	8.45%	-8,843	-31.97%	27,661
Cochise	28,092	56.17%	17,450	34.89%	4,473	8.94%	10,642	21.28%	50,015
Coconino	21,108	35.31%	32,404	54.20%	6,272	10.49%	-11,296	-18.89%	59,784
Gila	14,182	62.99%	7,003	31.10%	1,330	5.91%	7,179	31.89%	22,515
Graham	8,025	65.34%	3,301	26.88%	955	7.78%	4,724	38.46%	12,281
Greenlee	1,892	57.33%	1,092	33.09%	316	9.58%	800	24.24%	3,300
La Paz	4,003	67.27%	1,575	26.47%	373	6.27%	2,428	40.80%	5,951
Maricopa	747,361	47.67%	702,907	44.83%	117,566	7.50%	44,454	2.84%	1,567,834
Mohave	58,282	72.90%	17,455	21.83%	4,206	5.26%	40,827	51.07%	79,943
Navajo	20,577	51.07%	16,459	40.85%	3,258	8.09%	4,118	10.22%	40,294
Pima	167,428	39.71%	224,661	53.28%	29,551	7.01%	-57,233	-13.57%	421,640
Pinal	72,819	56.21%	47,892	36.97%	8,835	6.82%	24,927	19.24%	129,546
Santa Cruz	3,897	23.71%	11,690	71.14%	846	5.15%	-7,793	-47.43%	16,433
Yavapai	71,330	62.32%	35,590	31.10%	7,530	6.58%	35,740	31.22%	114,450
Yuma	25,165	47.47%	24,605	46.42%	3,240	6.11%	560	1.05%	53,010
Totals	1,252,401	48.08%	1,161,167	44.58%	191,089	7.34%	91,234	3.50%	2,604,657

==== By congressional district ====
Trump won five of nine congressional districts, with the remaining four going to Clinton. Each candidate won a district that elected a representative of the other party.

District	Trump	Clinton	Representative
1st	47%	46%	Ann Kirkpatrick
1st	47%	46%	Tom O'Halleran
2nd	44%	49%	Martha McSally
3rd	32%	62%	Raúl Grijalva
4th	67%	27%	Paul Gosar
5th	56%	36%	Matt Salmon
5th	56%	36%	Andy Biggs
6th	52%	42%	David Schweikert
7th	22%	71%	Ruben Gallego
8th	57%	36%	Trent Franks
9th	38%	53%	Kyrsten Sinema

=== Turnout ===
Voter Turnout was 74.2% with 2,661,497 ballots cast out of 3,588,466 voters.

== Analysis ==
Donald Trump won Arizona with a margin of 3.5%, a reduced margin from Mitt Romney's 9.0% margin in 2012. Arizona was among the eleven states in which Hillary Clinton outperformed Barack Obama's margin in 2012, primarily due to an increase in Hispanic voter turnout in southern Arizona, including heavily populated Maricopa County. This was the weakest performance for a Republican in the state since 1992. Trump also lost the 2nd congressional district that Romney had won four years earlier.

Maricopa County, in particular, went from a 10.7% margin of victory for Romney in 2012 to a 2.8% margin of victory for Trump, making this the first time since 1996 that the county was held to single digits. Clinton also came the closest of any Democrat to winning Yuma County since La Paz County broke off from it in the 1980s, as the county was last carried by a Democrat in 1964. Other rural counties that Bill Clinton had won in the 1990s continued to trend in a Republican direction, namely the formerly union-heavy Gila, Graham, and Greenlee counties. In terms of percentage of the vote, Trump's strongest support was in the northwest of the state, including Mohave County, which was the only county to give him over 70% of the vote. Clinton did best in the southern-central region along the US-Mexico border. Santa Cruz and Pima counties (home to Tucson) were among her strongest and among the places in the state where she outperformed Barack Obama in 2012.

== Electors ==
Arizona had 11 electors in 2016. All of them voted for Donald Trump for president and Mike Pence for vice president.

The electors were

- Bruce Ash
- Walter Begay
- Sharon Giese
- Robert Graham
- Alberto Gutier
- Jerry Hayden
- Carole Joyce
- Jane Pierpoint Lynch
- J. Foster Morgan
- James O'Connor
- Edward Robson

== See also ==
- 2016 Democratic Party presidential debates and forums
- 2016 Democratic Party presidential primaries
- 2016 Green Party presidential primaries
- 2016 Republican Party presidential debates and forums
- 2016 Republican Party presidential primaries
