= Arizona's 8th congressional district =

U.S. House district for Arizona

Coordinates: 33°41′44″N 112°17′59″W

- Interactive map of district boundaries since January 3, 2023
- Representative: Abraham Hamadeh; R–Phoenix
- Area: 9,057 mi^{2} (23,460 km^{2})
- Distribution: 87.3% urban; 12.7% rural
- Population (2025): 818,146
- Median household income: $88,114
- Ethnicity: 64.3% White; 21.1% Hispanic; 4.5% Asian; 4.5% Black; 4.0% Two or more races; 1.1% Native American; 0.5% other
- Cook PVI: R+8

Arizona's 8th congressional district is a congressional district located in the U.S. state of Arizona. It includes many of the suburbs north and west of Phoenix, in Maricopa County, Arizona. The district includes several retirement communities, including Sun City West.

After redistricting for the 2012 general election, the new 8th district encompasses most of the Maricopa County portion of the old 2nd district, while most of the former 8th district became the 2nd congressional district. It is the geographic and demographic successor of the old 2nd; while the 4th district contains most of the old 2nd's land, more than 92 percent of the old 2nd's constituents were drawn into the 8th.

This seat was vacated by Representative Trent Franks on December 8, 2017. A special election was held on April 24, 2018, and won by Republican Debbie Lesko. In 2024, Abraham Hamadeh was elected after Lesko retired.

== History ==
Arizona picked up an eighth congressional district after the 2000 census. It originally encompassed the extreme southeastern part of the state. It included all of Cochise County and parts of Pima, Pinal, and Santa Cruz counties. For all intents and purposes, it was the successor to what had been the 5th district from 1983 to 2003.

Longtime Republican incumbent Jim Kolbe retired in 2007, and was succeeded by Democrat Gabby Giffords, who was shot and severely wounded at a public event on January 8, 2011. Giffords resigned her seat on January 25, 2012. In a special election held on June 12, 2012, Democrat Ron Barber was elected as the new congressman.

For the 2012 election, Barber was redistricted to the 2nd district, which includes the bulk of the old 8th district. The 8th was redrawn to include nearly all of the Maricopa County portion of the old 2nd district–as mentioned above, more than 92 percent of the old 2nd's population. The district had previously been the 3rd district from 1963 to 2003. That district's congressman, Republican Trent Franks, won the election for the new 8th.

After the 2022 redistricting, the 8th was one of only two districts, the other being the East Valley-based 5th, that retained essentially its same boundaries.

== Composition ==
For the 118th and successive Congresses (based on redistricting following the 2020 census), the district contains all or portions of following counties and communities.

Maricopa County (8)

Anthem, Glendale (part; also 9th), New River, Peoria (part; also 2nd; shared with Yavapai County), Phoenix (part; also 1st, 3rd, and 4th), Sun City, Sun City West, Surprise (part; also 9th)

== Recent election results from statewide races ==
Year	Office	Results
2004	President	Bush 52.9% - 46.5%
2008	President	McCain 52.37% - 46.4%
2010	Senate	McCain 56.5% - 37.5%
2010	Governor	Brewer 54.1% - 43.4%
2010	Secretary of State	Bennett 55.9% - 44.1%
2010	Attorney General	Horne 52.6% - 47.4%
2010	Treasurer	Ducey 50.0% - 43.9%
2013–2023 Boundaries
2008	President	McCain 60.6% - 38.4%
2010	Senate	McCain 66.0% - 27.9%
2010	Governor	Brewer 61.8% - 35.2%
2012	President	Romney 61.7% - 36.9%
2012	Senate	Flake 56.3% - 38.9%
2014	Governor	Ducey 61.2% - 33.6%
2016	President	Trump 58.1% - 37.0%
2016	Senate	McCain 60.7% - 32.7%
2018	Senate	McSally 54.9% - 42.9%
2018	Governor	Ducey 64.7% - 33.2%
2018	Attorney General	Brnovich 60.0% - 39.8%
2020	President	Trump 57.3% - 41.4%
2020	Senate (Spec.)	McSally 56.7% - 43.3%
2023–2033 Boundaries
2016	President	Trump 56% - 37%
2016	Senate	McCain 60% - 33%
2018	Senate	McSally 54% - 44%
2018	Governor	Ducey 64% - 34%
2018	Attorney General	Brnovich 59% - 41%
2020	President	Trump 56% - 43%
2020	Senate (Spec.)	McSally 56% - 44%
2022	Senate	Masters 52% - 46%
2022	Governor	Lake 55% - 44%
2022	Secretary of State	Finchem 53% - 47%
2022	Attorney General	Hamadeh 56% - 44%
2022	Treasurer	Yee 62% - 38%
2024	President	Trump 58% - 41%
2024	Senate	Lake 53% - 45%

John McCain, the 2008 Republican nominee, was also a resident of Arizona and one of the state's two United States senators.

== List of members representing the district ==
Arizona began sending an eighth member to the House after the 2000 Census. Prior to this time, most of the 8th's current territory was in the 5th district.

Member (Residence)	Party	Years	Cong ress	Electoral history	District location
District created January 3, 2003
Jim Kolbe (Tucson)	Republican	January 3, 2003 – January 3, 2007	108th 109th	Redistricted from the 5th district. Re-elected in 2002. Re-elected in 2004. Retired.	2003–2013 Cochise; parts of Pima, Pinal, and Santa Cruz
Gabby Giffords (Tucson)	Democratic	January 3, 2007 – January 25, 2012	110th 111th 112th	Elected in 2006. Re-elected in 2008. Re-elected in 2010. Resigned.	2003–2013 Cochise; parts of Pima, Pinal, and Santa Cruz
Vacant		January 25, 2012 – June 19, 2012	112th		2003–2013 Cochise; parts of Pima, Pinal, and Santa Cruz
Ron Barber (Tucson)	Democratic	June 19, 2012 – January 3, 2013	112th	Elected to finish Giffords's term. Redistricted to the 2nd district.	2003–2013 Cochise; parts of Pima, Pinal, and Santa Cruz
Trent Franks (Glendale)	Republican	January 3, 2013 – December 8, 2017	113th 114th 115th	Redistricted from the 2nd district. Re-elected in 2012. Re-elected in 2014. Re-elected in 2016. Resigned.	2013–2023 Part of Maricopa
Vacant		December 8, 2017 – May 7, 2018	115th		2013–2023 Part of Maricopa
Debbie Lesko (Peoria)	Republican	May 7, 2018 – January 3, 2025	115th 116th 117th 118th	Elected to finish Franks's term. Re-elected in 2018. Re-elected in 2020. Re-elected in 2022. Retired.	2013–2023 Part of Maricopa
Debbie Lesko (Peoria)	Republican	May 7, 2018 – January 3, 2025	115th 116th 117th 118th	Elected to finish Franks's term. Re-elected in 2018. Re-elected in 2020. Re-elected in 2022. Retired.	2023–present: Part of Maricopa
Abraham Hamadeh (Phoenix)	Republican	January 3, 2025 – present	119th	Elected in 2024. Re-elected in 2026.	2023–present: Part of Maricopa

== Complete election results ==
=== 2002–2012 ===
==== 2002 ====
Arizona's 8th congressional district election, 2002
Party	Candidate	Votes	%
Republican	Jim Kolbe (incumbent)	126,930	63.3
Democratic	Mary Judge Ryan	67,328	33.6
Libertarian	Joe Duarte	6,142	3.1
Write-In	Jim Dorrance	28	0.0
Majority		59,602	29.7
Total votes		200,428	100.0
Republican win (new boundaries)			

==== 2004 ====
Arizona's 8th congressional district election, 2004
Party	Candidate	Votes	%	±%
Republican	Jim Kolbe (incumbent)	183,363	60.4	–3.0
Democratic	Eva Bacal	109,963	36.2	+2.6
Libertarian	Robert Anderson	10,443	3.4	+0.4
Majority		73,400	24.2	–5.6
Total votes		303,769	100.0	
Republican hold		Swing	–2.8	

==== 2006 ====
Arizona's 8th congressional district election, 2006
Party	Candidate	Votes	%	±%
Democratic	Gabby Giffords	137,655	54.3	+18.1
Republican	Randy Graf	106,790	42.1	–18.3
Libertarian	David Nolan	4,849	1.9	–1.5
Independent	Jay Quick	4,408	1.7	
Majority		30,865	12.2	N/a
Total votes		253,720	100.0	
Democratic gain from Republican		Swing	+18.2	

==== 2008 ====
Arizona's 8th congressional district election, 2008
Party	Candidate	Votes	%	±%
Democratic	Gabby Giffords (Incumbent)	179,629	54.7	+0.5
Republican	Tim Bee	140,553	42.8	+0.7
Libertarian	Paul Davis	8,081	2.5	+0.6
Majority		39,076	11.9	–0.3
Total votes		328,266	100.0	
Democratic hold		Swing	–0.1	

==== 2010 ====
Arizona's 8th congressional district election, 2010
Party	Candidate	Votes	%	±%
Democratic	Gabby Giffords (Incumbent)	138,280	48.8	–6.0
Republican	Jesse Kelly	134,124	47.3	+4.5
Libertarian	Steven Stoltz	11,174	3.9	+1.5
Majority		4,156	1.5	–10.4
Total votes		283,578	100.0	
Democratic hold		Swing	–5.2	

==== 2012 (special) ====
Arizona's 8th congressional district special election — June 12, 2012
Party	Candidate	Votes	%	±%
Democratic	Ron Barber	111,203	52.3	+3.6
Republican	Jesse Kelly	96,465	45.4	–1.9
Green	Charlie Manolakis	4,869	2.3	N/a
Majority		14,739	6.9	+5.5
Total votes		212,538	100.0	
Democratic hold		Swing	+2.7	

=== 2012–2022 ===
==== 2012 ====
Arizona's 8th congressional district election, 2012
Party	Candidate	Votes	%
Republican	Trent Franks	172,809	63.3
Democratic	Gene Scharer	95,635	35.1
Americans Elect	Stephen Dolgos	4,347	1.6
Majority		77,174	28.3
Total votes		272,791	100.0
Republican win (new boundaries)			

==== 2014 ====
Arizona's 8th congressional district election, November 4, 2014
Party	Candidate	Votes	%	±%
Republican	Trent Franks (Incumbent)	128,710	75.8	+12.5
Americans Elect	Stephen Dolgos	41,066	24.2	+22.6
Majority		87,644	51.6	+23.3
Total votes		169,776	100.0	
Republican hold		Swing	–5.1	

==== 2016 ====
Arizona's 8th congressional district election, 2016
Party	Candidate	Votes	%	±%
Republican	Trent Franks (Incumbent)	204,942	68.6	–7.2
Green	Mark Salazar	93,954	31.4	N/a
Majority		110,988	37.2	–14.5
Total votes		298,896	100.0	
Republican hold		Swing	–7.2	

==== 2018 (special) ====
Arizona's 8th congressional district special election - April 24, 2018
Party	Candidate	Votes	%	±%
Republican	Debbie Lesko	96,012	52.4	–16.2
Democratic	Hiral Tipirneni	87,331	47.6	N/a
Majority		8,681	4.7	–32.4
Total votes		183,343	100.0	
Republican hold		Swing	–16.2	

==== 2018 ====
Arizona's 8th congressional district, 2018
Party	Candidate	Votes	%	±%
Republican	Debbie Lesko (incumbent)	168,835	55.5	–13.1
Democratic	Hiral Tipirneni	135,569	44.5	N/a
Write-in		13	0.0	N/a
Majority		33,266	10.9	–26.2
Total votes		304,417	100.0	
Republican hold		Swing	–13.1	

==== 2020 ====
Arizona's 8th congressional district election, 2020
Party	Candidate	Votes	%	±%
Republican	Debbie Lesko (incumbent)	251,633	59.6	+4.1
Democratic	Michael Muscato	170,816	40.4	–4.1
Write-in		18	0.0	±0.0
Majority		80,817	19.1	+8.2
Total votes		422,467	100.0	
Republican hold		Swing	+4.1	

=== 2022–present ===
==== 2022 ====
Arizona's 8th congressional district election, 2022
Party	Candidate	Votes	%
Republican	Debbie Lesko (incumbent)	197,555	96.5
Democratic	write ins	7,158	3.5
Majority		190,397	93.0
Total votes		204,713	100.0
Republican win (new boundaries)			

==== 2024 ====
Arizona's 8th congressional district election, 2024
Party	Candidate	Votes	%	±%
Republican	Abraham Hamadeh	208,269	56.5	–40.0
Democratic	Gregory Whitten	160,344	43.5	+40.0
Majority		47,925	13.0	–80.0
Total votes		368,613	100.0	
Republican hold		Swing	–40.0	

== See also ==
- Arizona's congressional districts
- List of United States congressional districts
- 2018 Arizona's 8th congressional district special election
