= Ron Barber =

American politician (born 1945)

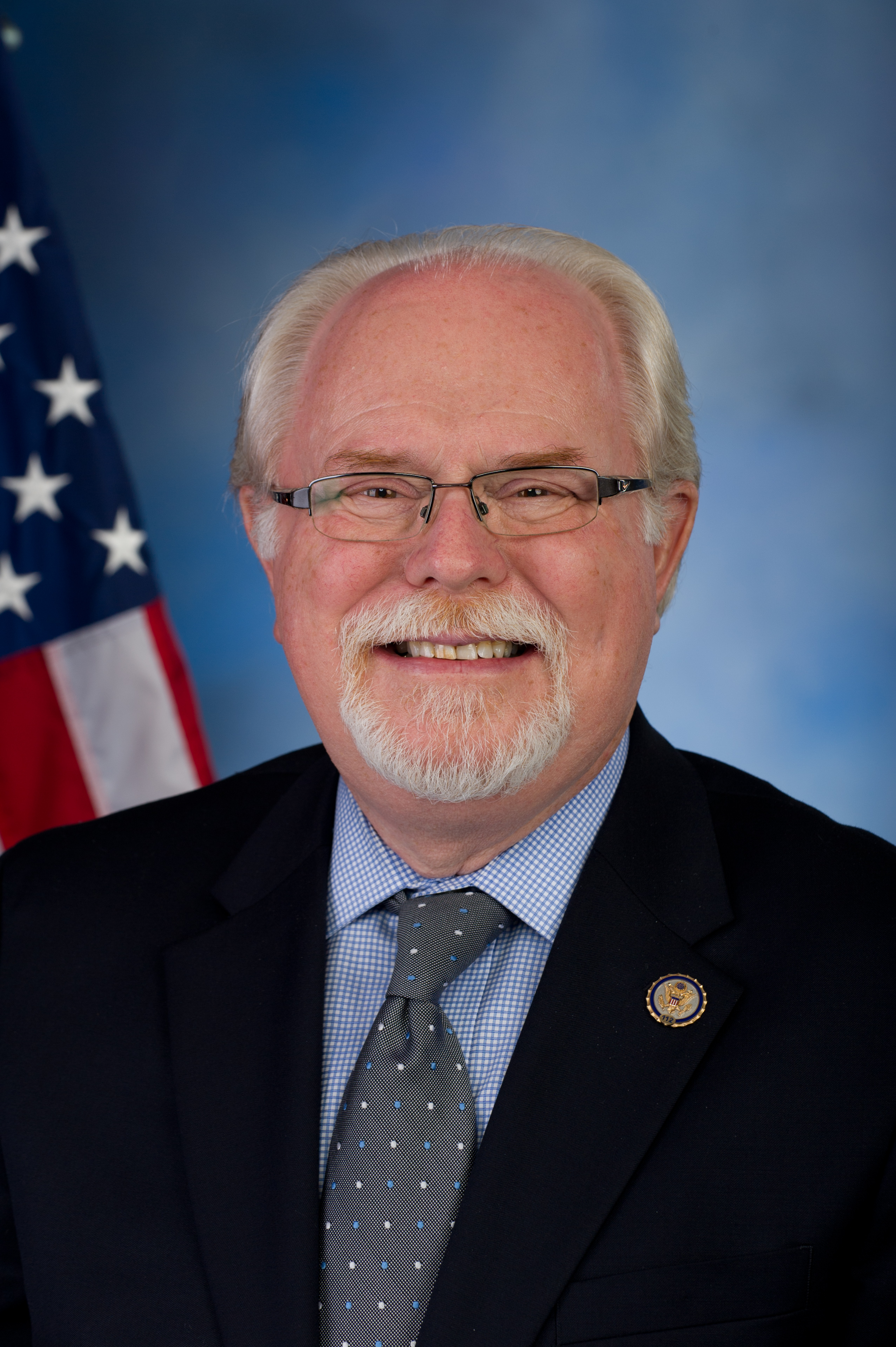
- Official portrait, 2012

Member of the U.S. House of Representatives from Arizona
- In office June 12, 2012 – January 3, 2015 (Note: Barber's official service begins on the date of the special election, while he was not sworn in until June 19, 2012.)
- Preceded by: Gabby Giffords
- Succeeded by: Martha McSally
- Constituency: 8th district (2012–2013); 2nd district (2013–2015)

Personal details
- Born: Ronald Sylvester Barber; August 25, 1945 (age 81) Wakefield, England
- Party: Democratic
- Spouse: Nancy Barber
- Children: 2
- Education: University of Arizona (BA)

Ronald Sylvester Barber (born August 25, 1945) is an American politician who was a member of the United States House of Representatives from 2012 to 2015. Barber, a member of the Democratic Party from Arizona, served as district director for U.S. Representative Gabby Giffords before Giffords resigned her seat due to the severe injuries she sustained in an assassination attempt, during which Barber was also injured. He won the Democratic nomination for the special election to finish Giffords's term and was sworn into office on June 19, 2012.

In the 2012 general election, he was elected to a full term. His district—numbered as the 8th district in 2012, and as the 2nd district since 2013—includes the eastern two-thirds of Tucson, as well as the southeastern corner of Arizona. Barber lost his 2014 re-election bid to Republican Martha McSally by 161 votes.

== Early life and education ==
Barber was born in Wakefield, England, during World War II. His father was an airman stationed at Davis-Monthan Air Force Base. Barber graduated from Tucson's Rincon High School in 1963, and earned a B.A. from the University of Arizona in 1967.

== Early public sector career ==
Barber worked as director and program manager of the Arizona Division of Developmental Disabilities in Pima County from 1974 to 2006.

Barber worked as Giffords' district director beginning in 2007. On January 8, 2011, Barber was shot in the thigh and face during an attempt on Giffords' life, in which Giffords was badly injured and six people were killed.

== U.S. House of Representatives ==
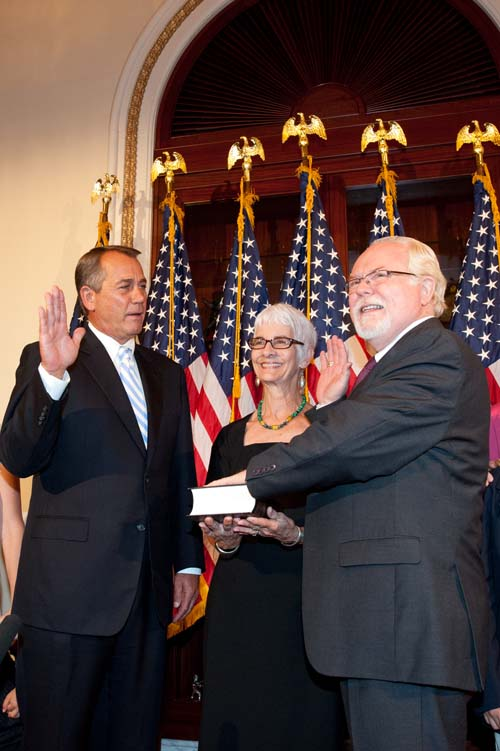
Barber being sworn in by then-Speaker of the House John Boehner

=== Elections ===
2012 special election

In 2012, following the resignation of Giffords, Barber decided to seek election to the seat. On June 12, 2012, he defeated Jesse Kelly, an Iraq War veteran, in a special election.

2012 regular election

On March 19, 2012, Barber announced that he would run for a full term in the district, which had been renumbered as the 2nd District, in the 2012 general election. The district was, at least on paper, slightly more Democratic than its predecessor. However, his race against Republican Martha McSally was one of the closest in the nation. McSally led on election night by a few hundred votes, but the race was initially too close to call due to a large number of provisional ballots. Barber eventually overtook McSally as more ballots were counted. By November 16, most of the outstanding ballots were in heavily Democratic precincts near Tucson. The Arizona Republic determined that as a result, McSally would not be able to pick up enough votes to overcome Barber's lead. By November 17, Barber's lead over McSally had grown to 1,400 votes. The same day, the Associated Press determined there weren't enough ballots outstanding for McSally to regain the lead, and called the race for Barber. McSally conceded the race later that morning.

2014

Barber ran for re-election in 2014. The Democratic primary election took place on August 26, 2014, with the general election slated for November 4, 2014. Martha McSally, whom Barber defeated in the 2012 election, won the Republican primary. According to USA Today, Arizona's 2nd Congressional District was expected to feature one of the most competitive House races of 2014.

In September 2014, Americans for Responsible Solutions (later merged into Giffords Law Center to Prevent Gun Violence), a pro-gun control PAC founded by Gabby Giffords, began running television ads in support of Barber.

With 100% of the votes counted, McSally had a 161-vote lead and declared victory on November 12, 2014, but due to the fact that the margin of victory was less than 1%, an automatic recount was legally required. Barber's campaign had been holding on to hope that 762 rejected ballots from Pima County would be counted during the recount, which began on December 3, 2014. Ultimately, Barber lost the recount to McSally by 161 votes.

=== Tenure ===
Touting his independence, Barber has voted the same way as Speaker of the House John Boehner on 10 out of the 16 occasions that Boehner has chosen to cast a vote – more than any other House Democrat.

Health care policy

In May 2013, Barber voted against repeal of the Patient Protection and Affordable Care Act.

Gun control

Barber is a strong supporter of gun control laws. In 2013, Barber co-sponsored a bill that would expand background checks on gun sales.

Abortion

Barber characterizes himself as pro-choice, and has voted against legislation that would prohibit federal funding for health plans that include abortion services.

Gay rights

Barber is a co-sponsor of the Respect for Marriage Act. He supported the repeal of Don't Ask, Don't Tell.

Immigration

Barber has called for increased border security. He supports the DREAM Act.

=== Committee assignments ===
Barber served on these committees.

- Committee on Armed Services
  - Subcommittee on Tactical Air and Land Forces
  - Subcommittee on Readiness
- Committee on Homeland Security
  - Subcommittee on Oversight and Management Efficiency (Ranking member)

== Personal life ==
Ron Barber and his wife Nancy live in Tucson, Arizona; the couple has two daughters. The Barbers operate a small business.

U.S. House of Representatives
Preceded by Gabby Giffords	Member of the U.S. House of Representatives from Arizona's 8th congressional district 2012–2013	Succeeded by Trent Franks
Preceded by Trent Franks	Member of the U.S. House of Representatives from Arizona's 2nd congressional district 2013–2015	Succeeded by Martha McSally
U.S. order of precedence (ceremonial)
Preceded by Ben Quayle as Former U.S. Representative	Order of precedence of the United States as Former U.S. Representative	Succeeded by Mary Peltola as Former U.S. Representative
