= 2012 Arizona's 8th congressional district special election =

2012 United States House of Representatives Special election in Arizona's 8th congressional district
- June 12, 2012

Arizona's 8th congressional district
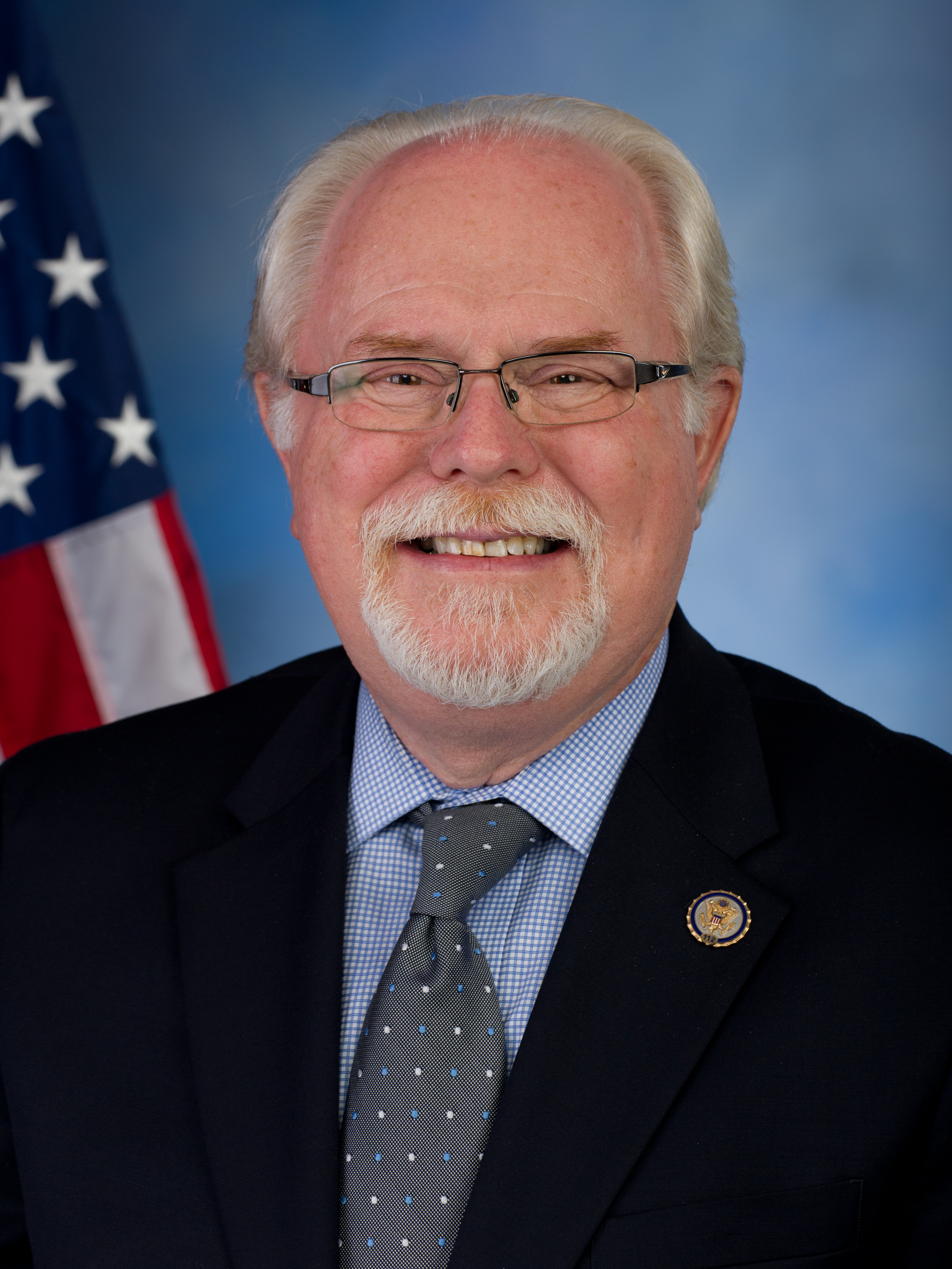

Nominee	Ron Barber	Jesse Kelly
Party	Democratic	Republican
Popular vote	111,204	96,465
Percentage	52.3%	45.4%
- County results Barber: 50–60% Kelly: 50–60%
U.S. Representative before election
Gabby Giffords
Democratic
Elected U.S. Representative
Ron Barber
Democratic

A 2012 special election in Arizona's 8th congressional district was held on June 12, with primary elections held on April 17, to fill a seat in the United States House of Representatives for Arizona's 8th congressional district until the 112th United States Congress ends on January 3, 2013. The election was caused by the resignation of Representative Gabby Giffords on January 25, 2012, to concentrate on recovering from her injuries from the 2011 Tucson shooting. The seat was won by Ron Barber, a former aide to Giffords who was wounded in the attempt on her life.

== Background ==
Governor of Arizona Jan Brewer announced April 17 to be the date for the special primary elections and June 12 for the special general election.

== Democratic primary ==
=== Candidates ===
==== Nominee ====
- Ron Barber, small business owner and Giffords' District Director

==== Withdrawn ====
- Matt Heinz, state representative

==== Declined ====
- Paula Aboud, Arizona Senate Whip.
- John Adams, retired Brigadier General
- David Crowe, software company owner
- Steve Farley, Arizona House of Representatives
- Jeff Latas, former vice chair of the Arizona Democratic Party and 2006 primary candidate
- Linda J. Lopez, state senator
- Janet Napolitano, former Governor of Arizona and United States Secretary of Homeland Security
- Daniel Patterson, state representative
- Tim Sultan, program chair of the Democrats of Greater Tucson and 2004 primary candidate
- Ramon Valadez, Pima County, Arizona Supervisor
- Nan Stockholm Walden, Farmer Investments VP and former chief of staff to Senator Bill Bradley
- Bruce Wheeler, state representative

=== Results ===
Democratic primary results
Party	Candidate	Votes	%
Democratic	Ron Barber	44,185	100.0
Total votes		44,185	100.0

== Republican primary ==
=== Candidates ===
==== Nominee ====
- Jesse Kelly, Iraq War veteran and the Republican nominee for this seat in 2010

==== Eliminated in primary ====
- Frank Antenori, state senator and Iraq War veteran
- Martha McSally, U.S. Air Force colonel, first female USAF air combat pilot
- Dave Sitton, businessman, broadcaster, and coach

==== Declined ====
- Jonathan Paton, state senator and 2010 primary candidate

=== Results ===
Republican primary results
Party	Candidate	Votes	%
Republican	Jesse Kelly	27,101	35.1
Republican	Martha McSally	19,413	25.1
Republican	Frank Antenori	17,497	22.6
Republican	Dave Sitton	13,299	17.2
Total votes		77,310	100

== General election ==
=== Polling ===
Poll source	Date(s) administered	Sample size	Margin of error	Ron Barber (D)	Jesse Kelly (R)	Charlie Manolakis (G)	Undecided
Public Policy Polling	June 9–10, 2012	1,058	± 3.0%	53%	41%	4%	3%
National Research (R)	April 12, 2012	300	±5.7%	45%	49%	—	6%

Hypothetical polling

==== With McSally ====
Poll source	Date(s) administered	Sample size	Margin of error	Ron Barber (D)	Martha McSally (R)	Undecided
National Research (R)	April 12, 2012	300	±5.7%	42%	42%	16%

=== Results ===
Arizona's 8th congressional district, 2012 (special)
Party	Candidate	Votes	%	±%
Democratic	Ron Barber	111,204	52.32%	+3.56%
Republican	Jesse Kelly	96,465	45.39%	−1.91%
Green	Charlie Manolakis	4,869	2.29%	N/A
Total votes		'212,538'	'100.0%'	N/A
Democratic hold				

==== By county ====
County	Ron Barber Democratic		Jesse Kelly Republican		Charlie Manolakis Green		Margin		Total
County	#	%	#	%	#	%	#	%	Total
Cochise	11,946	45.22%	13,940	52.77%	832	2.01%	-1,994	-7.55%	26,718
Pima (part)	95,712	53.67%	78,697	44.13%	3,933	2.20%	17,015	9.54%	178,342
Pinal (part)	3,055	54.55%	2,485	44.38%	60	1.07%	570	10.17%	5,600
Santa Cruz (part)	1,061	56.50%	773	41.16%	44	2.34%	288	15.24%	1,878
Totals	111,204	52.32%	96,465	45.39%	4,869	2.29%	14,739	6.93%	212,538

== See also ==
- List of special elections to the United States House of Representatives
