= Jerry Hayden =

Jerry L. Hayden
- Education: Bradley University; Northwestern University
- Occupation: Businessman
- Employer: Peacock Engineering

Jerry Hayden is a retired American businessman and conservative donor.

== Personal life and education ==
Hayden graduated from Woodruff High School in Peoria, Illinois in 1951. After serving in the Army during the Korean War, Hayden attended Bradley University on the G.I. Bill. Hayden also served as captain of the track team, and was awarded an athletic scholarship. Hayden earned a bachelor's degree in mechanical engineering in 1959 from Bradley University. He earned a master's degree in business administration from Northwestern University in 1970. Hayden and his wife, Marilyn, both attended Bradley University.

== Career ==
Hayden joined Peacock Engineering, a packaging services company, in 1971 as marketing manager. He became president in 1972, staying in that position until 1996. Hayden retired from Peacock Engineering in 2007. Hayden was the majority shareholder of Peacock Engineering at the time the company was sold to Behrman Capital in 2007 for $172.5 million.

== Political activity ==
Hayden and his wife are major backers of the Club for Growth, giving $400,000 to the conservative organization in 2012. Hayden has also donated to FreedomWorks and the political causes of the Koch Brothers.

He also served as an elector in the 2016 US presidential election for Republican candidate Donald Trump in Arizona. Trump won the state.

== Philanthropy ==
Hayden and his wife pledged $2.5 million to Bradley University toward construction of a new alumni center.
