= U.S. Women's Chamber of Commerce =

The U.S. Women's Chamber of Commerce was founded in 2001 to increase economic growth opportunities for women. As the only national organization of its kind, the U.S. Women's Chamber of Commerce works in concert with its over 500,000 members, national and local association partners, and key influencers to open doors for women business owners and career professionals.

== Focus ==
Key areas of focus for the U.S. Women's Chamber of Commerce include: access to government contracting markets, access to capital for business start-up and growth, access to political office, access to education, and access to career promotions. In each area, the U.S. Women's Chamber of Commerce works towards integrating women into the mainstream and providing access to economic advancement.

== History ==
In 2005, the U.S. Women's Chamber of Commerce won a lawsuit against the U.S. Small Business Administration for failure to implement a law passed in 2000 to provide a targeted set-aside program for women-owned businesses seeking federal contracts. This set-aside was established to help end the disparity in contracting faced by women. Even though women own nearly 30 percent of all businesses in the United States, in 2007 they received only 3.41% of federal contracts.

In 2007, the U.S. Women's Chamber of Commerce filed an amicus brief in support of the women's class action suit against Walmart.

In 2008, Margot Dorfman, CEO of the U.S. Women's Chamber of Commerce, provided testimony before the Senate Committee on Health, Education, Labor and Pension in support of the Lilly Ledbetter Fair Pay Act of 2009. Her testimony was cited by Sen. Patrick Leahy (D-VT) as follows:

As the executive director of the U.S. Women's Chamber of Commerce recently noted, "The Fair Pay Restoration Act rewards those who play fair—including women business owners—unlike the Supreme Court's decision, which seems to give an unfair advantage to those who skirt the rules." This legislation will encourage all corporations to treat their employees fairly.

Leaders and members of the U.S. Women's Chamber of Commerce are regularly called upon to testify before Congress on small business and economic issues.

On June 30, 2011, the Small Business Administration accepted the U.S. Women's Chamber of Commerce as an approved Third Party Certifier for the Women-Owned Small Business Contracting Program. To further opportunities for women-owned small business federal contractors, the U.S. Women's Chamber of Commerce established the WOSB National Council.

In 2014, the U.S. Women's Chamber of Commerce established the I Vote for Women.org website to support the election of candidates supporting the chamber's women's economic priorities.

On September 11, 2014, the U.S. Women's Chamber of Commerce filed an amici curiae in support of Peggy Young for her case before the Supreme Court, Young v. UPS No. 12-1226, detailing the economic impact of women in the workforce.

On December 3, 2015, the U.S. Women's Chamber of Commerce announced their first ever presidential endorsement as they endorsed Secretary Hillary Clinton for the 2016 U.S. Presidential race. The chamber stated that the leadership examined the organization’s priorities along with the history, capability, commitments and electability of current presidential candidates in making the selection.

== Association Members ==
The U.S. Women's Chamber of Commerce maintains a broad assortment of partners and association members including regional, national, and international organizations.

- Alaska 8(a) Association
- Arizona Small Business Association
- Arizona Women Business Builders
- Asian Women in Business
- Association for Small Business and Technology
- Association for Women in Architecture
- Association of Procurement Technical Assistance Centers
- Association of Small Business Development Centers
- Association of Women Contractors
- Business Women's Network of Howard County
- Catalyst Women
- Charo Community Development Corporation
- Community Physical Therapists
- Dress for Success - Washington DC
- Financial Women International
- Fort Worth Business Assistance Center
- Girls in Government
- Greater Cincinnati Women's Network
- Hispanic Women's Corporation
- Insight Center for Community Economic Development
- Institute for Women's Policy Research
- Latin Business Association
- Michigan Association of Female Executives
- National Association of Women in Construction
- Minority/Women Business Enterprise Alliance, Inc.
- National Center for American Indian Enterprise
- National Center for Small Business Information
- National Procurement Council
- National Women's Political Caucus
- Nebraska Women's Commission
- New Jersey Association of Women Business Owners
- Peninsula Tidewater Hispanic Chamber of Commerce
- Professional Businesswomen of California
- Professional Women in Construction
- San Antonio Women's Chamber of Commerce
- Society of Government Travel Professionals
- Soroptimist International of the Americas
- Tennessee Economic Council on Women
- United for the Advancement of Women in the Construction Industry
- University of Georgia SBDC
- Women & Girls Foundation of SW PA
- Women Business Owners of Montgomery County
- Women Business Owners of Prince George's County
- Women's Automotive Association International
- Women's Business Council Gulf Coast
- Women's Campaign Fund
- Women's Chamber of Commerce of Palm Beach City
- Women's Sports Foundation
