= List of United States representatives from Arizona =

The following is an alphabetical list of United States representatives from the state of Arizona. For chronological tables of members of both houses of the United States Congress from the state (through the present day), see Arizona's congressional delegations. It includes members who have represented both the state and the territory, both past and present. Statehood was granted in 1912.

== Current members ==
Updated September 2025.

- 1st district - David Schweikert (R) (since 2011)
- 2nd district - Eli Crane (R) (since 2023)
- 3rd district - Yassamin Ansari (D) (since 2025)
- 4th district - Greg Stanton (D) (since 2019)
- 5th district - Andy Biggs (R) (since 2017)
- 6th district - Juan Ciscomani (R) (since 2023)
- 7th district - Adelita Grijalva (D) (since 2025)
- 8th district - Abraham Hamadeh (R) (since 2025)
- 9th district - Paul Gosar (R) (since 2011)

== List of members and delegates ==
Member / Delegate	Party	District	Years	Electoral history
Yassamin Ansari	Democratic	3rd	January 3, 2025 – present	Elected in 2024.
Ron Barber	Democratic	8th	June 12, 2012 – January 3, 2013	Elected to finish Giffords's term. Redistricted to the 2nd district.
Ron Barber	Democratic	2nd	January 3, 2013 – January 3, 2015	Redistricted from the 8th district and re-elected in 2012. Lost re-election to McSally.
Coles Bashford	Independent	Territory	March 4, 1867 – March 3, 1869	Elected in 1886. Retired when appointed Secretary of State of Arizona Territory.
Curtis Coe Bean	Republican	Territory	March 4, 1885 – March 3, 1887	Elected in 1884. Lost re-election to Smith.
Andy Biggs	Republican	5th	January 3, 2017 – present	Elected in 2016. Re-elected in 2018. Re-elected in 2020. Re-elected in 2022. Re-elected in 2024.
Ralph Henry Cameron	Republican	Territory	March 4, 1909 – February 18, 1912	Elected in 1908. Re-elected in 1910. Retired to run for U.S. Senate.
John Goulder Campbell	Democratic	Territory	March 4, 1879 – March 3, 1881	Elected in 1878. Retired.
Juan Ciscomani	Republican	6th	January 3, 2023 – present	Elected in 2022. Re-elected in 2024.
John Bertrand Conlan	Republican	4th	January 3, 1973 – January 3, 1977	Elected in 1972. Re-elected in 1974. Retired to run for U.S. senator.
Samuel G. Coppersmith	Democratic	1st	January 3, 1993 – January 3, 1995	Elected in 1992. Retired to run for U.S. senator.
Eli Crane	Republican	2nd	January 3, 2023 – present	Elected in 2022. Re-elected in 2024.
Lewis W. Douglas	Democratic	At-large	March 4, 1927 – March 4, 1933	Elected in 1926. Re-elected in 1928. Re-elected in 1930. Re-elected in 1932. Resigned to become Director of U.S. Office of Management and Budget.
Karan English	Democratic	6th	January 3, 1993 – January 3, 1995	Elected in 1992. Lost re-election to Hayworth.
Jeff Flake	Republican	1st	January 3, 2001 – January 3, 2003	Elected in 2000. Redistricted to the 6th district.
Jeff Flake	Republican	6th	January 3, 2003 – January 3, 2013	Redistricted from the 1st district. Re-elected in 2002. Re-elected in 2004. Re-elected in 2006. Re-elected in 2008. Re-elected in 2010. Retired to run for U.S. senator.
Trent Franks	Republican	2nd	January 3, 2003 – January 3, 2013	Elected in 2002. Re-elected in 2004. Re-elected in 2006. Re-elected in 2008. Re-elected in 2010. Redistricted to the 8th district.
Trent Franks	Republican	8th	January 3, 2013 – December 8, 2017	Redistricted from the 2nd district. Re-elected in 2012. Re-elected in 2014. Re-elected in 2016. Resigned due to sexual harassment investigation by House Ethics Committee.
Ruben Gallego	Democratic	7th	January 3, 2015 – January 3, 2023	Elected in 2014. Re-elected in 2016. Re-elected in 2018. Re-elected in 2020.. Redistricted to the 3rd district.
Ruben Gallego	Democratic	3rd	January 3, 2023 – January 3, 2025	Redistricted from the 7th district and re-elected in 2022. Retired to run for U.S. Senate.
Gabby Giffords	Democratic	8th	January 3, 2007 – January 25, 2012	Elected in 2006. Re-elected in 2008. Re-elected in 2010. Resigned to focus on her recovery from an assassination attempt.
John Noble Goodwin	Republican	Territory	March 4, 1865 – March 3, 1867	Elected in 1865. Retired.
Paul Gosar	Republican	1st	January 3, 2011 – January 3, 2013	Elected in 2010. Redistricted to the 4th district.
Paul Gosar	Republican	4th	January 3, 2013 – January 3, 2023	Redistricted from the 1st district and re-elected in 2012. Re-elected in 2014. Re-elected in 2016. Re-elected in 2018. Re-elected in 2020. Redistricted to the 9th district.
Paul Gosar	Republican	9th	January 3, 2023 – present	Redistricted from the 4th district and re-elected in 2022. Re-elected in 2024.
Isabella Selmes Greenway	Democratic	At-large	October 3, 1933 – January 3, 1937	Elected to finish Douglas's term. Re-elected in 1934. Retired.
Adelita Grijalva	Democratic	7th	October 2025 – present	Elected to finish her father's term.
Raúl M. Grijalva	Democratic	7th	January 3, 2003 – January 3, 2013	Elected in 2002. Re-elected in 2004. Re-elected in 2006. Re-elected in 2008. Re-elected in 2010. Redistricted to the 3rd district.
Raúl M. Grijalva	Democratic	3rd	January 3, 2013 – January 3, 2023	Redistricted from the 7th district and re-elected in 2012. Re-elected in 2014. Re-elected in 2016. Re-elected in 2018. Re-elected in 2020. Redistricted to the 7th district.
Raúl M. Grijalva	Democratic	7th	January 3, 2023 – March 13, 2025	Redistricted from the 3rd district and re-elected in 2022. Re-elected in 2024. Died.
Abraham Hamadeh	Republican	8th	January 3, 2025 – present	Elected in 2024.
Richard F. Harless	Democratic	At-large	January 3, 1943 – January 3, 1949	Elected in 1942. Re-elected in 1944. Re-elected in 1946. Retired to run for Governor of Arizona.
Carl Hayden	Democratic	At-large	February 19, 1912 – March 3, 1927	Elected in 1911. Re-elected in 1912. Re-elected in 1914. Re-elected in 1916. Re-elected in 1918. Re-elected in 1920. Re-elected in 1922. Re-elected in 1924. Retired to run for U.S. senator.
J. D. Hayworth	Republican	6th	January 3, 1995 – January 3, 2003	Elected in 1994. Re-elected in 1996. Re-elected in 1998. Re-elected in 2000. Redistricted to the 5th district.
J. D. Hayworth	Republican	5th	January 3, 2003 –January 3, 2007	Redistricted from the 6th district Re-elected in 2002. Re-elected in 2004. Lost re-election to Mitchell.
Ann Kirkpatrick	Democratic	1st	January 3, 2009 – January 3, 2011	Elected in 2008. Lost re-election to Gosar.
Ann Kirkpatrick	Democratic	1st	January 3, 2013 – January 3, 2017	Elected in 2012. Re-elected in 2014. Retired to run for U.S. senator.
Ann Kirkpatrick	Democratic	2nd	January 3, 2019 – January 3, 2023	Elected in 2018. Re-elected in 2020. Retired.
Jim Kolbe	Republican	5th	January 3, 1985 – January 3, 2003	Elected in 1984. Re-elected in 1986. Re-elected in 1988. Re-elected in 1990. Re-elected in 1992. Re-elected in 1994. Re-elected in 1996. Re-elected in 1998. Re-elected in 2000. Redistricted to the 8th district.
Jim Kolbe	Republican	8th	January 3, 2003 – January 3, 2007	Redistricted from the 5th district. Re-elected in 2002. Re-elected in 2004. Retired.
Jon Kyl	Republican	4th	January 3, 1987 – January 3, 1995	Elected in 1986. Re-elected in 1988. Re-elected in 1990. Re-elected in 1992. Retired to run for U.S. senator.
Debbie Lesko	Republican	8th	May 7, 2018 – January 3, 2025	Elected to finish Franks's term. Re-elected in 2018. Re-elected in 2020. Re-elected in 2022. Retired to run for Maricopa County Board of Supervisors.
John McCain	Republican	1st	January 3, 1983 – January 3, 1987	Elected in 1982. Re-elected in 1984. Retired to run for U.S. senator.
Richard Cunningham McCormick	Unionist	Territory	March 4, 1869 – March 3, 1875	Elected in 1868. Re-elected in 1870. Re-elected in 1872. Retired.
James Francis McNulty, Jr.	Democratic	5th	January 3, 1983 – January 3, 1985	Elected in 1982. Lost re-election to Kolbe.
Martha McSally	Republican	2nd	January 3, 2015 – January 3, 2019	Elected in 2014. Re-elected in 2016. Retired to run for U.S. Senator.
Harry Mitchell	Democratic	5th	January 3, 2007 – January 3, 2011	Elected in 2006. Re-elected in 2008. Lost re-election to Schweikert.
John R. Murdock	Democratic	At-large	January 3, 1937 – January 3, 1949	Elected in 1936. Re-elected in 1938. Re-elected in 1940. Re-elected in 1942. Re-elected in 1944. Re-elected in 1946. Redistricted to 1st district.
John R. Murdock	Democratic	1st	January 3, 1949 – January 3, 1953	Redistricted from the at-large district and re-elected in 1948. Re-elected in 1950. Lost re-election to Rhodes.
Nathan Oakes Murphy	Republican	Territory	March 4, 1895 – March 3, 1897	Elected in 1894. Retired.
Tom O'Halleran	Democratic	1st	January 3, 2017 – January 3, 2023	Elected in 2016. Re-elected in 2018. Re-elected in 2020. Redistricted to the 2nd district and lost re–election to Crane.
Granville Henderson Oury	Democratic	Territory	March 4, 1881 – March 3, 1885	Elected in 1880. Re-elected in 1882. Retired.
Ed Pastor	Democratic	2nd	October 3, 1991 – January 3, 2003	Elected to finish Udall's term. Re-elected in 1992. Re-elected in 1994. Re-elected in 1996. Re-elected in 1998. Re-elected in 2000. Redistricted to the 4th district.
Ed Pastor	Democratic	4th	January 3, 2003 – January 3, 2013	Redistricted from the 2nd district. Re-elected in 2002. Re-elected in 2004. Re-elected in 2006. Re-elected in 2008. Re-elected in 2010. Redistricted to the 7th district.
Ed Pastor	Democratic	7th	January 3, 2013 – January 3, 2015	Redistricted from 4th district. Re-elected in 2012. Retired.
Harold A. Patten	Democratic	2nd	January 3, 1949 – January 3, 1955	Elected in 1948. Re-elected in 1950. Re-elected in 1952. Retired.
Charles Debrille Poston	Republican	Territory	December 5, 1864 – March 3, 1865	Elected in 1864. Lost re-election to Goodwin.
Ben Quayle	Republican	3rd	January 3, 2011 – January 3, 2013	Elected in 2010. Redistricted to the 6th district and lost renomination to Schweikert.
Rick Renzi	Republican	1st	January 3, 2003 – January 3, 2009	Elected in 2002. Re-elected in 2004. Re-elected in 2006. Retired.
John Jacob Rhodes	Republican	1st	January 3, 1953 – January 3, 1983	Elected in 1952. Re-elected in 1954. Re-elected in 1956. Re-elected in 1958. Re-elected in 1960. Re-elected in 1962. Re-elected in 1964. Retired.
John Jacob Rhodes III	Republican	1st	January 3, 1987 – January 3, 1993	Elected in 1986. Re-elected in 1988. Re-elected in 1990. Lost re-election to Coppersmith.
Eldon D. Rudd	Republican	4th	January 3, 1977 – January 3, 1987	Elected in 1976. Re-elected in 1978. Re-elected in 1980. Re-elected in 1982. Re-elected in 1984. Retired.
Matt Salmon	Republican	1st	January 3, 1995 – January 3, 2001	Elected in 1994. Re-elected in 1996. Re-elected in 1998. Retired to run for Governor of Arizona.
Matt Salmon	Republican	5th	January 3, 2013 – January 3, 2017	Elected in 2012. Re-elected in 2014. Retired.
David Schweikert	Republican	5th	January 3, 2011 – January 3, 2013	Elected in 2010. Redistricted to the 6th district.
David Schweikert	Republican	6th	January 3, 2013 – January 3, 2023	Redistricted from the 5th district. Re-elected in 2012. Re-elected in 2014. Re-elected in 2016. Re-elected in 2018. Re-elected in 2020. Redistricted to the 1st district.
David Schweikert	Republican	1st	January 3, 2013 – present	Redistricted from the 6th district. Re-elected in 2022. Re-elected in 2024.
George Frederick Senner, Jr.	Democratic	3rd	January 3, 1963 – January 3, 1967	Elected in 1962. Re-elected in 1964. Lost re-election to Steiger.
John B. Shadegg	Republican	4th	January 3, 1995 – January 3, 2003	Elected in 1994. Re-elected in 1996. Re-elected in 1998. Re-elected in 2000. Redistricted to the 3rd district.
John B. Shadegg	Republican	3rd	January 3, 2003 – January 3, 2011	Redistricted from the 4th district and re-elected in 2002. Re-elected in 2004. Re-elected in 2006. Re-elected in 2008. Retired.
Kyrsten Sinema	Democratic	9th	January 3, 2013 – January 3, 2019	Elected in 2012. Re-elected in 2014. Re-elected in 2016. Retired to run for U.S. senator.
Marcus Aurelius Smith	Democratic	Territory	March 4, 1887 – March 3, 1895	Elected in 1886. Re-elected in 1888. Re-elected in 1890. Re-elected in 1892. Retired.
Marcus Aurelius Smith	Democratic	Territory	March 4, 1897 – March 3, 1899	Elected in 1896. Lost renomination to Wilson.
Marcus Aurelius Smith	Democratic	Territory	March 4, 1901 – March 3, 1903	Elected in 1900. Retired.
Marcus Aurelius Smith	Democratic	Territory	March 4, 1905 – March 3, 1909	Elected in 1904. Re-elected in 1906. Lost re-election to Cameron.
Greg Stanton	Democratic	9th	January 3, 2019 – January 3, 2023	Elected in 2018. Re-elected in 2020. Redistricted to the 4th district.
Greg Stanton	Democratic	4th	January 3, 2019 – present	Redistricted from the 6th district. Re-elected in 2022. Re-elected in 2024.
Sam Steiger	Republican	3rd	January 3, 1967 – January 3, 1977	Elected in 1966. Re-elected in 1968. Re-elected in 1970. Re-elected in 1972. Re-elected in 1974. Retired to run for U.S. Senator.
Hiram Sanford Stevens	Democratic	Territory	March 4, 1875 – March 3, 1879	Elected in 1874. Re-elected in 1876. Lost re-election to Campbell.
Bob Stump	Democratic	3rd	January 3, 1977 – January 3, 1982	Elected in 1976. Re-elected in 1978. Re-elected in 1980.
Bob Stump	Republican	3rd	January 3, 1982 – January 3, 2003	Re-elected in 1982 as a Republican. Re-elected in 1984. Re-elected in 1986. Re-elected in 1988. Re-elected in 1990. Re-elected in 1992. Re-elected in 1994. Re-elected in 1996. Re-elected in 1998. Re-elected in 2000. Retired.
Mo Udall	Democratic	2nd	May 2, 1961 – May 4, 1991	Elected to finish his brother's term. Re-elected in 1962. Re-elected in 1964. Re-elected in 1966. Re-elected in 1968. Re-elected in 1970. Re-elected in 1972. Re-elected in 1974. Re-elected in 1976. Re-elected in 1978. Re-elected in 1980. Re-elected in 1982. Re-elected in 1984. Re-elected in 1986. Re-elected in 1988. Re-elected in 1990. Resigned for health reasons.
Stewart Lee Udall	Democratic	2nd	January 3, 1955 – January 21, 1961	Elected in 1954. Re-elected in 1956. Re-elected in 1958. Re-elected in 1960. Resigned to become U.S. Secretary of the Interior.
John Frank Wilson	Democratic	Territory	March 4, 1899 – March 3, 1901	Elected in 1898. Lost renomination to Smith.
John Frank Wilson	Democratic	Territory	March 4, 1903 – March 3, 1905	Elected in 1902. Retired.

== See also ==
- Arizona's congressional delegations
- Arizona's congressional districts
- List of United States senators from Arizona
