= 2006 United States House of Representatives elections in Arizona =

- November 7, 2006

All 8 Arizona seats to the United States House of Representatives
	Majority party	Minority party	Third party
Party	Republican	Democratic	Libertarian
Last election	6	2	0
Seats won	4	4	0
Seat change	▼2	▲2	Steady
Popular vote	771,246	627,259	90,214
Percentage	51.7%	42.0%	6.0%
Swing	▼8.6%	▲10.1%	▼1.7%

Republican
40–50%
50–60%
60–70%
70–80%
Democratic
40–50%
50–60%
60–70%
70–80%

The 2006 congressional elections in Arizona were elections for Arizona's delegation to the United States House of Representatives, which occurred along with congressional elections nationwide on November 7, 2006. Arizona has eight seats, as apportioned during the 2000 United States census. Prior to the election, Republicans held six of the eight seats and Democrats held two. In the 8th district, Republican Congressman Jim Kolbe retired, leaving an open seat. Following the elections, Democrats gained two seats at the expense of the Republicans, who lost two.

== Overview ==
=== Statewide ===
Party	Candidates	Votes		Seats		
Party	Candidates	No.	%	No.	+/–	%
Republican	8	771,246	51.65	4	▼2	50.00
Democratic	7	627,259	42.01	4	▲2	50.00
Libertarian	8	90,214	6.04	0	Steady	0.0
Independent	1	4,408	0.30	0	Steady	0.0
Write-in	4	24	0.00	0	Steady	0.0
Total	28	1,493,151	100.0	8	Steady	100.0

Popular vote
Republican	51.65%
Democratic	42.01%
Libertarian	6.04%
Other	0.30%

House seats
Republican	50.00%
Democratic	50.00%

=== By district ===
Results of the 2008 United States House of Representatives elections in Arizona by district:

District	Republican		Democratic		Libertarian		Others		Total		Result
District	Votes	%	Votes	%	Votes	%	Votes	%	Votes	%	Result
District 1	105,646	51.75%	88,691	43.45%	9,802	4.80%	0	0.00%	204,139	100.0%	Republican hold
District 2	135,150	58.62%	89,671	38.89%	5,734	2.49%	5	0.00%	230,560	100.0%	Republican hold
District 3	112,519	59.27%	72,586	38.23%	4,744	2.50%	0	0.00%	189,849	100.0%	Republican hold
District 4	18,627	23.92%	56,464	72.52%	2,770	3.56%	0	0.00%	77,861	100.0%	Democratic hold
District 5	93,815	46.44%	101,838	50.41%	6,357	3.15%	0	0.00%	202,010	100.0%	Democratic gain
District 6	152,201	74.80%	0	0.00%	51,285	25.20%	0	0.00%	203,486	100.0%	Republican hold
District 7	46,498	35.35%	80,354	61.09%	4,673	3.55%	0	0.00%	131,525	100.0%	Democratic hold
District 8	106,790	42.09%	137,655	54.25%	4,849	1.91%	4,427	1.74%	253,721	100.0%	Democratic gain
Total	771,246	51.65%	627,259	42.01%	90,214	6.04%	4,432	0.30%	1,493,151	100.0%	

== District 1 ==
2006 Arizona's 1st congressional district election
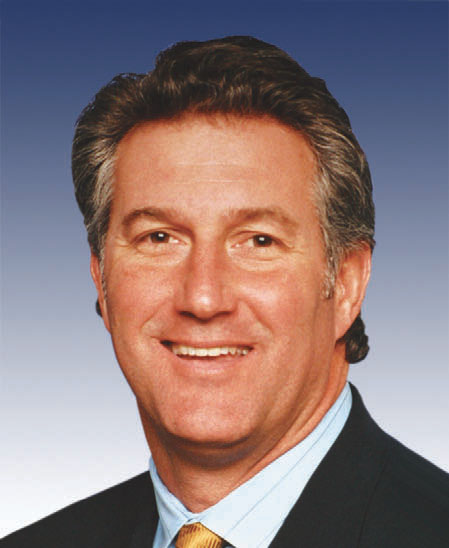

Nominee	Rick Renzi	Ellen Simon
Party	Republican	Democratic
Popular vote	105,646	88,691
Percentage	51.8%	43.5%
- County results Renzi: 40–50% 50–60% 60–70% Simon: 40–50% 50–60%
U.S. Representative before election
Rick Renzi
Republican
Elected U.S. Representative
Rick Renzi
Republican

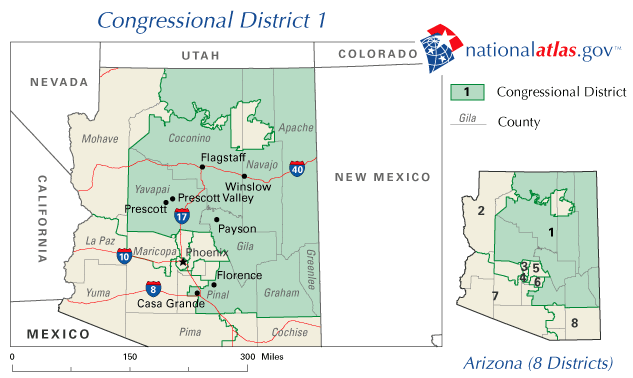

The normally Republican 1st district, based in the region north of Phoenix and Tucson and one of the largest districts by land area in the country, had been represented by Republican Rick Renzi since his initial election in 2002.

=== Republican primary ===
Renzi faced ethical problems in this election and was named by Citizens for Responsibility and Ethics in Washington as one of the most corrupt candidates running for office that year.

==== Candidates ====
===== Nominee =====
- Rick Renzi, incumbent U.S. Representative

==== Results ====
Republican primary results
Party	Candidate	Votes	%
Republican	Rick Renzi	37,644	100.0
Total votes		37,644	100.0

=== Democratic primary ===
==== Candidates ====
===== Nominee =====
- Ellen Simon, attorney and activist

===== Eliminated in primary =====
- Mike Caccioppoli, former radio correspondent
- Bob Donahue, businessman and candidate for this seat in 2004
- Susan Friedman, marketing director
- Vic McKerlie, dentist

===== Withdrawn =====
- Jack Jackson Jr., former state representative

==== Results ====
Democratic primary results
Party	Candidate	Votes	%
Democratic	Ellen Simon	20,273	52.8
Democratic	Susan Friedman	7,062	18.4
Democratic	Bob Donahue	5,927	15.4
Democratic	Mike Caccioppoli	3,635	9.5
Democratic	Vic McKerlie	1,512	3.9
Total votes		38,409	100.0

=== Libertarian primary ===
==== Candidates ====
===== Nominee =====
- David Schlosser, public relations manager

==== Results ====
Libertarian primary results
Party	Candidate	Votes	%
Libertarian	David Schlosser	606	100.0
Total votes		606	100.0

=== General election ===
==== Campaign ====
Attorney and community activist Ellen Simon emerged as the Democratic nominee, and though she initially trailed Renzi by wide margins she made up much a large amount of ground and closed the gap, causing many to consider the race competitive. Simon challenged Renzi to a series of eight debates, to which Renzi responded by attacking Simon's husband for being behind on child support payments to his ex-wife.

On 24 October, federal officials opened an inquiry into Renzi. It began when a local landowner filed a complaint that said that Renzi had pressured him into buying land he owned in exchange for his support on the landowner's petition with the federal government for a land swap. When that landowner refused, Renzi sold the land to a second company, who funneled the $200,000 payment ($330,000 adjusted for inflation) through a wine company his father owned. Fortunately for Renzi some of these details didn't come to light until after the election.

==== Endorsements ====
Rick Renzi (R)

Federal officials

- George W. Bush, 43rd President of the United States
Ellen Simon (D)

State officials

- Albert Hale, state representative

Organizations

- EMILY's List

Newspapers and publications

- Esquire

Individuals

- Wesley Clark, General, former Supreme Allied Commander Europe, 2004 democratic presidential candidate

==== Polling ====
Poll source	Date(s) administered	Sample size	Margin of error	Rick Renzi (R)	Ellen Simon (D)	David Schlosser (L)	Undecided
RT Strategies and Constituent Dynamics	October 24–26, 2006	1,037 (LV)	±?%	48%	46%	4%	3%
Northern Arizona University	October 20–22, 2006	403 (LV)	±5.0%	45%	32%	2%	21%
RT Strategies and Constituent Dynamics	October 8–10, 2006	983 (LV)	±?%	46%	51%	2%	2%
Northern Arizona University	September 15–17, 2006	403 (LV)	±5.0%	45%	32%	2%	21%

==== Predictions ====
Source	Ranking	As of
The Cook Political Report	Tossup	November 6, 2006
Rothenberg	Tilt R	November 6, 2006
Sabato's Crystal Ball	Tilt R	November 6, 2006
Real Clear Politics	Lean R	November 7, 2006
CQ Politics	Tossup	November 7, 2006

==== Results ====
Renzi won re-election by an eight-point margin, despite the strong Democratic performance nationwide.

2006 Arizona’s 1st congressional district election
Party	Candidate	Votes	%
Republican	Rick Renzi (incumbent)	105,646	51.8
Democratic	Ellen Simon	88,691	43.5
Libertarian	David Schlosser	9,802	4.8
Total votes		204,139	100.0
Republican hold			

== District 2 ==
2006 Arizona's 2nd congressional district election
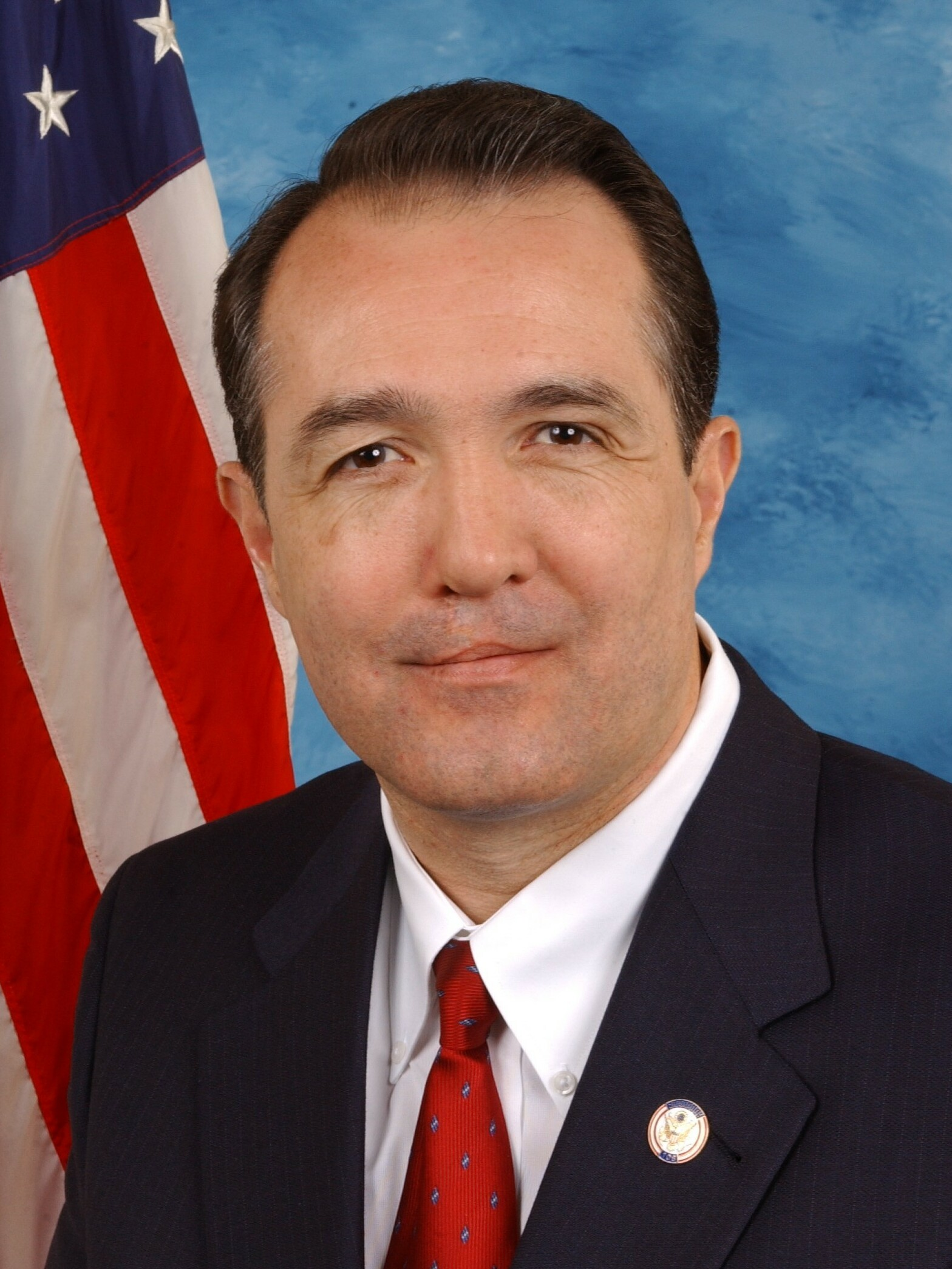

Nominee	Trent Franks	John Thrasher
Party	Republican	Democratic
Popular vote	135,150	89,671
Percentage	58.6%	38.9%
- County results Franks: 50–60% 60–70% Thrasher: 60–70% 70–80%
U.S. Representative before election
Trent Franks
Republican
Elected U.S. Representative
Trent Franks
Republican

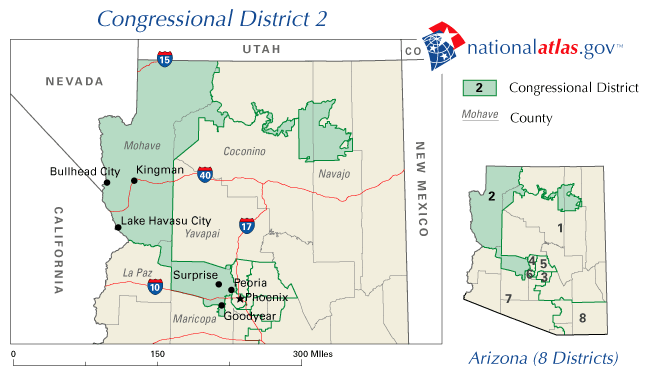

The heavily conservative and gerrymandered District 2, which owed its strange shape to the decision to not have Hopi and Navajo Native Americans represented by the same congressman due to historic tensions between them, had been represented by Republican Trent Franks since his initial election in 2002. Franks had been re-elected comfortably in the intervening years due to the conservative nature of the Phoenix suburbs that the district pulled from.

=== Republican primary ===
==== Candidates ====
===== Nominee =====
- Trent Franks, incumbent U.S. Representative

==== Results ====
Republican primary results
Party	Candidate	Votes	%
Republican	Trent Franks (incumbent)	51,386	100.0
Total votes		51,386	100.0

=== Democratic primary ===
==== Candidates ====
===== Nominee =====
- John Thrasher, educator

===== Eliminated in primary =====
- Suchindran Chatterjee, engineer and educator
- Gene Scharer, educator and nominee for this seat in 2000

==== Results ====
Democratic primary results
Party	Candidate	Votes	%
Democratic	John Trasher	11,521	46.7
Democratic	Gene Scharer	8,462	34.3
Democratic	Suchindran Chatterjee	4,667	18.9
Total votes		24,650	100.0

=== Libertarian primary ===
==== Candidates ====
===== Nominee =====
- Powell Gamill, molecular biologist

==== Results ====
Libertarian primary results
Party	Candidate	Votes	%
Libertarian	Powell Gammill	494	100.0
Total votes		494	100.0

=== Independents ===
- William Crum (write-in), blogger

=== General election ===
==== Campaign ====
Franks faced Democratic challenger John Thrasher, a music teacher who based his campaign around anti-corruption and immigration reform.

==== Predictions ====
Source	Ranking	As of
The Cook Political Report	Safe R	November 6, 2006
Rothenberg	Safe R	November 6, 2006
Sabato's Crystal Ball	Safe R	November 6, 2006
Real Clear Politics	Safe R	November 7, 2006
CQ Politics	Safe R	November 7, 2006

==== Results ====
Franks comfortably won re-election, albeit by a smaller margin than usual.

2006 Arizona’s 2nd congressional district election
Party	Candidate	Votes	%
Republican	Trent Franks (incumbent)	135,150	58.6
Democratic	John Thrasher	89,671	38.9
Libertarian	Powell Gammill	5,734	2.5
Write-In	William Crum	5	0.0
Total votes		230,560	100.0
Republican hold			

== District 3 ==
2006 Arizona's 3rd congressional district election
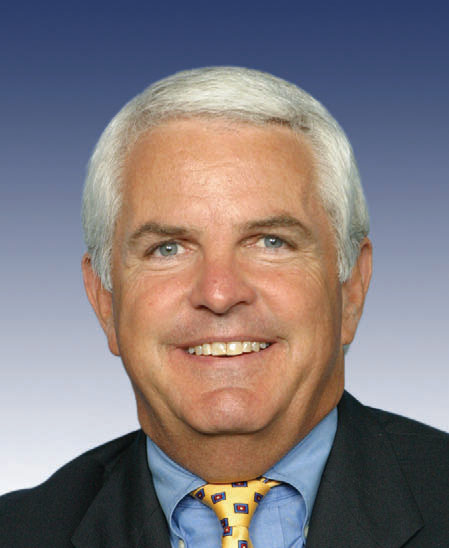

Nominee	John Shadegg	Herb Paine
Party	Republican	Democratic
Popular vote	112,519	72,586
Percentage	59.3%	38.2%
- Shadegg: 40–50% 50–60% 60–70% 70–80% Paine: 40–50% 50–60%
U.S. Representative before election
John Shadegg
Republican
Elected U.S. Representative
John Shadegg
Republican

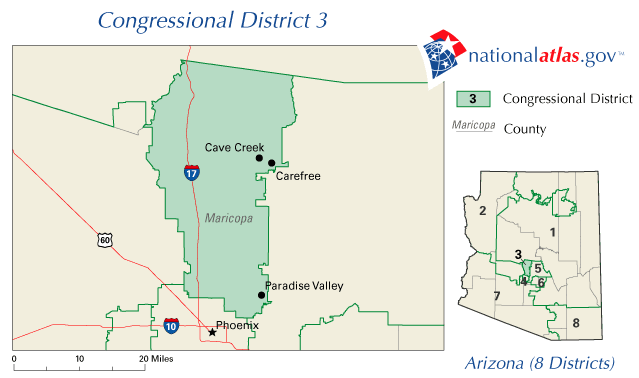

The staunchly conservative 3rd district, based in the northern portion of Phoenix and its northern suburbs, had been represented by incumbent Republican John Shadegg since his initial election in 1994.

=== Republican primary ===
==== Candidates ====
===== Nominee =====
- John Shadegg, incumbent U.S. Representative

==== Results ====
Republican primary results
Party	Candidate	Votes	%
Republican	John Shadegg (incumbent)	35,763	100.0
Total votes		35,763	100.0

=== Democratic primary ===
==== Candidates ====
===== Nominee =====
- Herb Paine, consultant

===== Eliminated in primary =====
- Don Chilton, retired engineer
- Jim McCoy

==== Results ====
Democratic primary results
Party	Candidate	Votes	%
Democratic	Herb Paine	7,902	50.4
Democratic	Don Chilton	7,759	49.5
Democratic	Jim McCoy	12	0.1
Total votes		15,673	100.0

=== Libertarian primary ===
==== Candidates ====
===== Nominee =====
- Mark Yannone, businessman

==== Results ====
Libertarian primary results
Party	Candidate	Votes	%
Libertarian	Mark Yannone	322	100.0
Total votes		322	100.0

=== General election ===
==== Endorsements ====
Herb Paine (D)

Individuals

- Wesley Clark, General, former Supreme Allied Commander Europe, 2004 democratic presidential candidate

==== Predictions ====
Source	Ranking	As of
The Cook Political Report	Safe R	November 6, 2006
Rothenberg	Safe R	November 6, 2006
Sabato's Crystal Ball	Safe R	November 6, 2006
Real Clear Politics	Safe R	November 7, 2006
CQ Politics	Safe R	November 7, 2006

==== Results ====
True to the district's conservative nature, Shadegg defeated Paine by a wide margin, though it was significantly reduced from his 2004 margin.

2006 Arizona’s 3rd congressional district election
Party	Candidate	Votes	%
Republican	John Shadegg (incumbent)	112,519	59.3
Democratic	Herb Paine	72,586	38.2
Libertarian	Mark Yannone	4,744	2.5
Total votes		189,849	100.0
Republican hold			

== District 4 ==
2006 Arizona's 4th congressional district election
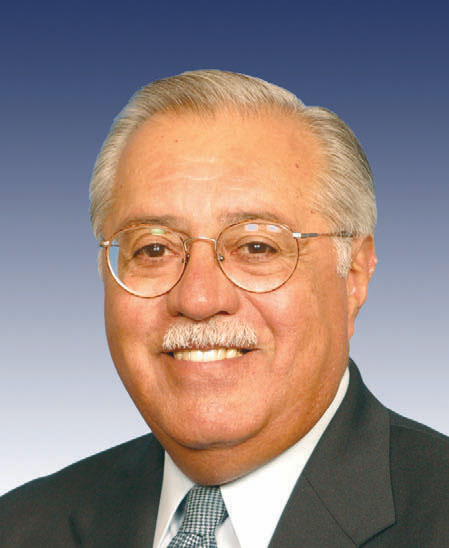

Nominee	Ed Pastor	Don Karg
Party	Democratic	Republican
Popular vote	56,464	18,627
Percentage	72.5%	23.9%
- County results Pastor: 70–80%
U.S. Representative before election
Ed Pastor
Democratic
Elected U.S. Representative
Ed Pastor
Democratic

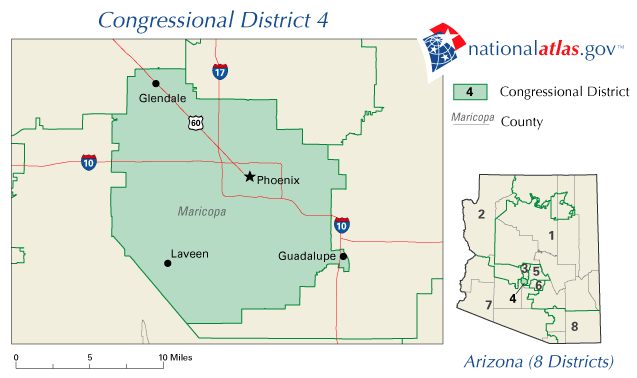

The heavily liberal 4th district, based in the southern portion of Phoenix and its southern suburbs, had a high Hispanic-American population. Incumbent Democrat Ed Pastor had represented this portion of the state since a special election in 1991 to replace Mo Udall.

=== Democratic primary ===
==== Candidates ====
===== Nominee =====
- Ed Pastor, incumbent U.S. Representative

==== Results ====
Democratic primary results
Party	Candidate	Votes	%
Democratic	Ed Pastor (incumbent)	14,833	100.0
Total votes		14,833	100.0

=== Republican primary ===
==== Candidates ====
===== Nominee =====
- Don Karg, aerospace executive

==== Results ====
Republican primary results
Party	Candidate	Votes	%
Republican	Don Karg	7,175	100.0
Total votes		7,175	100.0

=== Libertarian primary ===
==== Candidates ====
===== Nominee =====
- Ronald Harders, write-in candidate

==== Results ====
Libertarian primary results
Party	Candidate	Votes	%
Libertarian	Ronald Harders	12	100.0
Total votes		12	100.0

=== General election ===
==== Predictions ====
Source	Ranking	As of
The Cook Political Report	Safe D	November 6, 2006
Rothenberg	Safe D	November 6, 2006
Sabato's Crystal Ball	Safe D	November 6, 2006
Real Clear Politics	Safe D	November 7, 2006
CQ Politics	Safe D	November 7, 2006

==== Results ====
2006 Arizona’s 4th congressional district election
Party	Candidate	Votes	%
Democratic	Ed Pastor (incumbent)	56,464	72.5
Republican	Don Karg	18,627	23.9
Libertarian	Ronald Harders	2,770	3.6
Total votes		77,861	100.0
Democratic hold			

== District 5 ==
2006 Arizona's 5th congressional district election
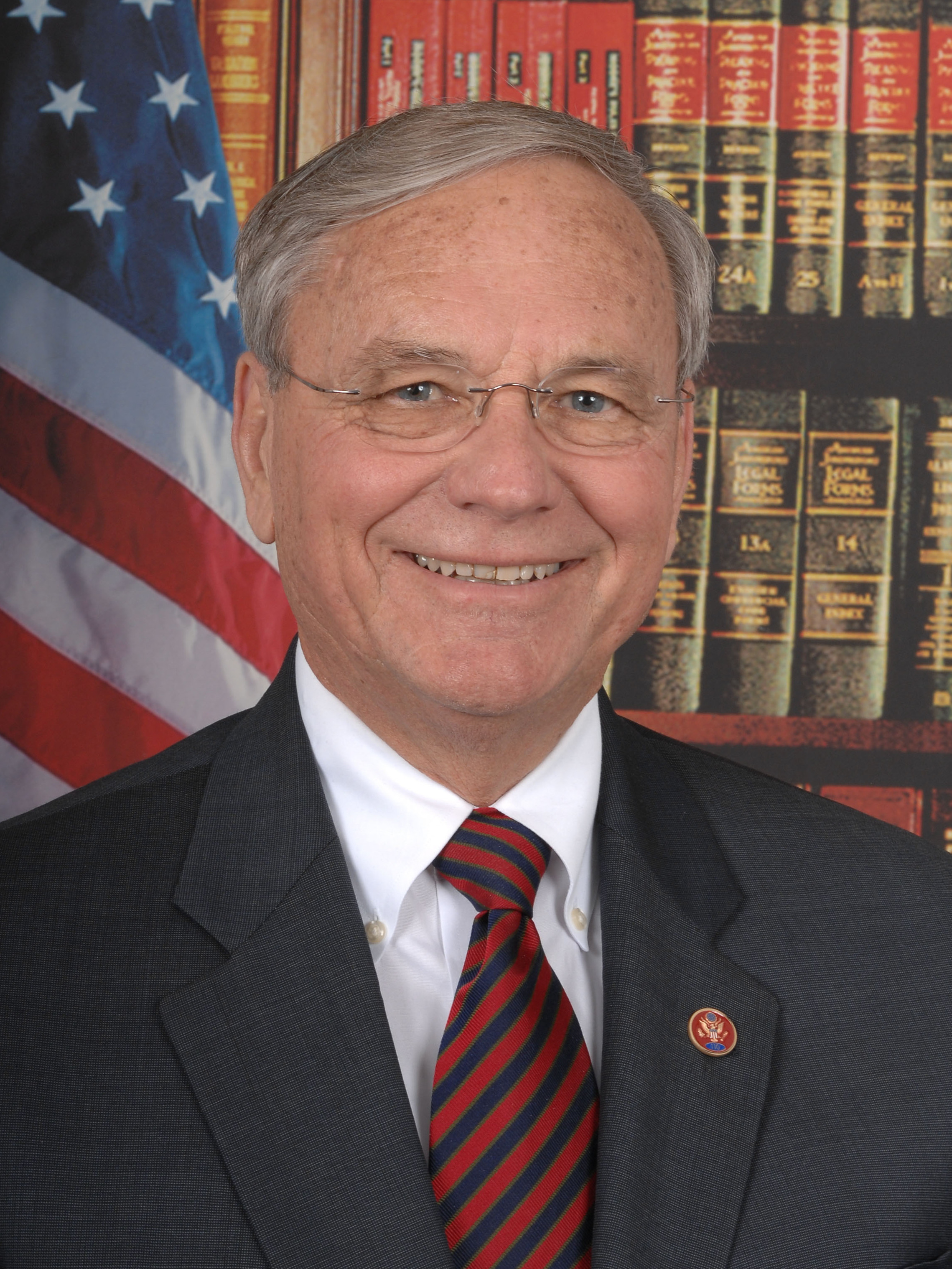

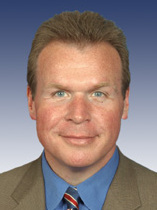
Nominee	Harry Mitchell	J. D. Hayworth
Party	Democratic	Republican
Popular vote	101,838	93,815
Percentage	50.4%	46.4%
- Mitchell: 40–50% 50–60% 60–70% 70–80% 80–90% Hayworth: 40–50% 50–60% 60–70% 70–80% >90% Tie: 40–50% No votes
U.S. Representative before election
J. D. Hayworth
Republican
Elected U.S. Representative
Harry Mitchell
Democratic

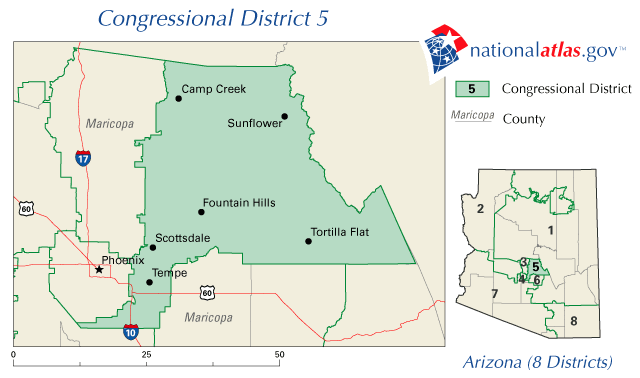

The conservative-leaning 5th district included a small portion of Phoenix and many of its northeastern suburbs, such as Scottsdale and Tempe. Republican J. D. Hayworth had represented the area since his initial election in 1994 and many considered him to be vulnerable to a Democratic challenger.

=== Republican primary ===
==== Candidates ====
===== Nominee =====
- J. D. Hayworth, incumbent U.S. Representative

==== Results ====
Republican primary results
Party	Candidate	Votes	%
Republican	J. D. Hayworth (incumbent)	38,275	100.0
Total votes		38,275	100.0

=== Democratic primary ===
Harry Mitchell, a former Mayor of Tempe, State Senator, and Chairman of the Democratic Party of Arizona, emerged as the Democrats' leading challenger to Hayworth.

==== Candidates ====
===== Nominee =====
- Harry Mitchell, chair of the Democratic Party of Arizona former state senator and former Mayor of Tempe

==== Endorsements ====
Harry Mitchell (D)

Individuals

- Wesley Clark, General, former Supreme Allied Commander Europe, 2004 democratic presidential candidate

==== Results ====
Democratic primary results
Party	Candidate	Votes	%
Democratic	Harry Mitchell	20,852	100.0
Total votes		20,852	100.0

=== Libertarian primary ===
==== Candidates ====
===== Nominee =====
- Warren Severin, businessman

==== Results ====
Libertarian primary results
Party	Candidate	Votes	%
Libertarian	Warren Severin	387	100.0
Total votes			100.0

=== General election ===
==== Debates ====
- Complete video of debate, September 1, 2006
- Complete video of debate, October 17, 2006

==== Polling ====
Poll source	Date(s) administered	Sample size	Margin of error	J. D. Hayworth (R)	Harry Mitchell (D)	Warren Severin (L)	Undecided
SurveyUSA	October 29–31, 2006	643 (LV)	±3.9%	46%	48%	4%	2%
Bennett, Petts & Normington (D)	October 18–19, 2006	400 (LV)	±?%	47%	46%	–	7%
SurveyUSA	October 13–15, 2006	509 (LV)	±4.4%	48%	45%	5%	2%
Public Opinion Strategies (R)	September 18–19, 2006	400 (LV)	±?%	52%	38%	–	10%
SurveyUSA	September 15–17, 2006	590 (LV)	±4.1%	52%	40%	4%	4%
Grove Insight (D)	September 12–14, 2006	400 (LV)	±?%	37%	40%	–	23%
Public Opinion Strategies (R)	June 6–10, 2006	400 (LV)	±?%	49%	34%	–	17%
SurveyUSA	May 5–8, 2006	600 (RV)	±4.1%	50%	45%	–	5%

==== Predictions ====
Source	Ranking	As of
The Cook Political Report	Tossup	November 6, 2006
Rothenberg	Tilt D (flip)	November 6, 2006
Sabato's Crystal Ball	Tilt D (flip)	November 6, 2006
Real Clear Politics	Tossup	November 7, 2006
CQ Politics	Tossup	November 7, 2006

==== Results ====
The race was close for much of the fall, and Mitchell ultimately edged out Hayworth on election day by a four-point margin and was elected to his first term in Congress.

2006 Arizona’s 5th congressional district election
Party	Candidate	Votes	%
Democratic	Harry Mitchell	101,838	50.4
Republican	J. D. Hayworth (incumbent)	93,815	46.4
Libertarian	Warren Severin	6,357	3.2
Total votes		202,010	100.0
Democratic gain from Republican			

== District 6 ==
2006 Arizona's 6th congressional district election
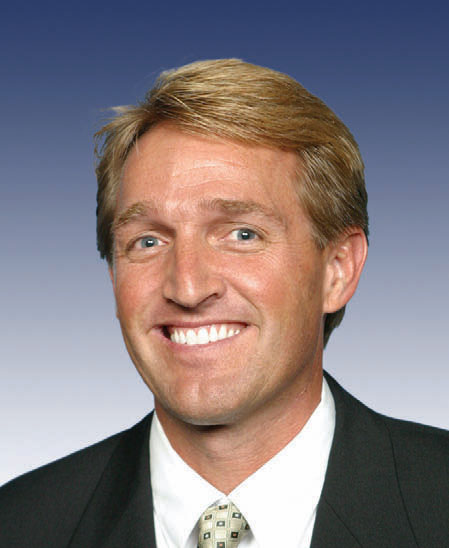

Nominee	Jeff Flake	Jason M. Blair
Party	Republican	Libertarian
Popular vote	152,201	51,285
Percentage	74.8%	25.2%
- County results Flake: 70–80%
U.S. Representative before election
Jeff Flake
Republican
Elected U.S. Representative
Jeff Flake
Republican

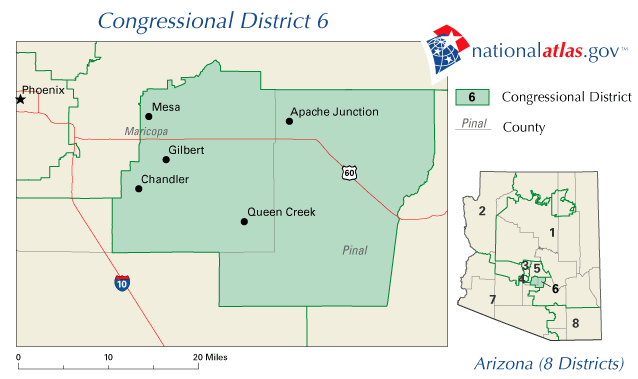

The heavily conservative 6th district, based in the eastern suburbs of Phoenix, had been represented by Republican Congressman Jeff Flake since his initial election in 2000.

=== Republican primary ===
Flake had built up a repertoire in Congress as being a staunch fiscal conservative and an anti-earmark advocate.

==== Candidates ====
===== Nominee =====
- Jeff Flake, incumbent U.S. Representative

==== Results ====
Republican primary results
Party	Candidate	Votes	%
Republican	Jeff Flake (incumbent)	43,199	100.0
Total votes		43,199	100.0

=== Democratic primary ===
No Democrat filed.

=== Libertarian primary ===
==== Candidates ====
===== Nominee =====
- Jason M. Blair

==== Results ====
Libertarian primary results
Party	Candidate	Votes	%
Libertarian	Jason M. Blair	19	100.0
Total votes		19	100.0

=== General election ===
==== Predictions ====
Source	Ranking	As of
The Cook Political Report	Safe R	November 6, 2006
Rothenberg	Safe R	November 6, 2006
Sabato's Crystal Ball	Safe R	November 6, 2006
Real Clear Politics	Safe R	November 7, 2006
CQ Politics	Safe R	November 7, 2006

==== Results ====
Flake faced no Democratic opponent and was overwhelmingly re-elected to his fourth term in Congress over Libertarian candidate Jason Blair.

Republican primary results
Party	Candidate	Votes	%
Republican	Jeff Flake (incumbent)	152,201	74.8
Libertarian	Jason M. Blair	51,285	25.2
Total votes		203,486	100.0
Republican hold			

== District 7 ==
2006 Arizona's 7th congressional district election
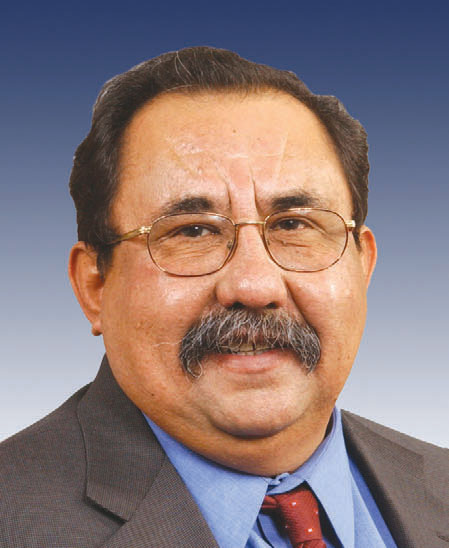

Nominee	Raúl Grijalva	Ron Drake
Party	Democratic	Republican
Popular vote	80,354	46,498
Percentage	61.1%	35.4%
- County results Grijalva: 70–80% Drake: 40–50% 50–60%
U.S. Representative before election
Raúl Grijalva
Democratic
Elected U.S. Representative
Raúl Grijalva
Democratic

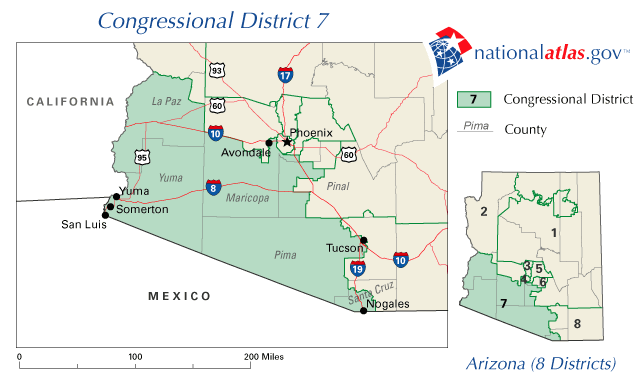

The heavily Democratic 7th district, based in southwestern Arizona and covering much of the state's border with Mexico, had a majority Hispanic-American population and had been represented by Democratic Congressman Raúl Grijalva since 2003.

=== Democratic primary ===
==== Candidates ====
===== Nominee =====
- Raúl Grijalva, incumbent U.S. Representative

==== Results ====
Democratic primary results
Party	Candidate	Votes	%
Democratic	Raúl Grijalva	26,604	100.0
Total votes		26,604	100.0

=== Republican primary ===
==== Candidates ====
===== Nominee =====
- Ron Drake, former Mayor of Avondale

===== Eliminated in primary =====
- Joseph Sweeney, perennial candidate

==== Results ====
Republican primary results
Party	Candidate	Votes	%
Republican	Ron Drake	11,521	57.7
Republican	Joseph Sweeney	8,462	42.3
Total votes		19,983	100.0

=== Libertarian primary ===
==== Candidates ====
===== Nominee =====
- Joe Cobb, political advisor and economic instructor

==== Results ====
Libertarian primary results
Party	Candidate	Votes	%
Libertarian	Joe Cobb	13	100.0
Total votes		13	100.0

=== General election ===
Grijalva faced the former Mayor of Avondale, Republican Ron Drake, and Libertarian write-in candidate Joe Cobb.

==== Predictions ====
Source	Ranking	As of
The Cook Political Report	Safe D	November 6, 2006
Rothenberg	Safe D	November 6, 2006
Sabato's Crystal Ball	Safe D	November 6, 2006
Real Clear Politics	Safe D	November 7, 2006
CQ Politics	Safe D	November 7, 2006

==== Results ====
Grijalva defeated both Drake and Cobb by a comfortable margin.

2006 Arizona’s 7th congressional district election
Party	Candidate	Votes	%
Democratic	Raúl Grijalva (incumbent)	80,354	61.1
Republican	Ron Drake	46,498	35.4
Libertarian	Joe Cobb	4,673	3.6
Total votes		131,525	100.0
Democratic hold			

== District 8 ==
2006 Arizona's 8th congressional district election
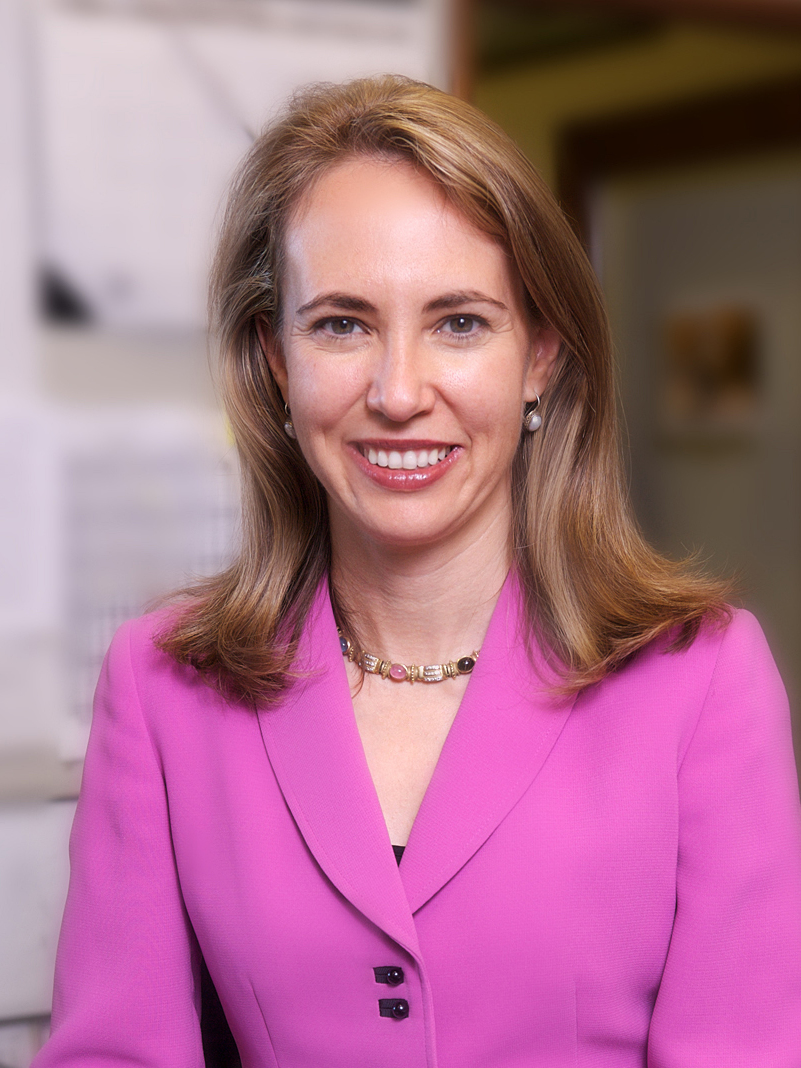

Nominee	Gabby Giffords	Randy Graf
Party	Democratic	Republican
Popular vote	137,655	106,790
Percentage	54.3%	42.1%
- County results Giffords: 40–50% 50–60% Graf: 50–60%
U.S. Representative before election
Jim Kolbe
Republican
Elected U.S. Representative
Gabby Giffords
Democratic

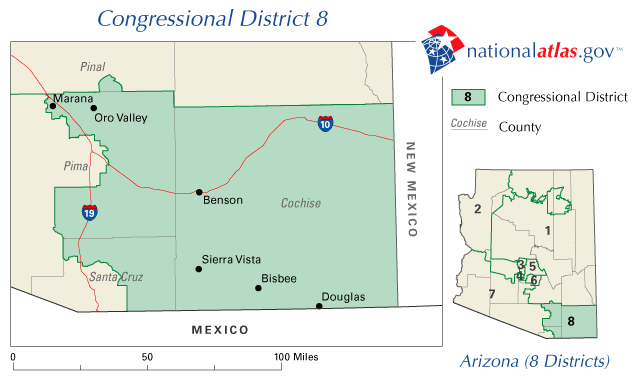

Long-serving Republican Congressman Jim Kolbe, a respected moderate and an openly gay man, declined to seek a seventh term in Congress and thus created an open seat. The marginally conservative 8th district, based in southeastern Arizona, had narrowly supported George W. Bush in 2000 and 2004 and the election was considered to be competitive.

=== Republican primary ===
Former State Representative Randy Graf, who was heavily conservative and had challenged Kolbe in the Republican primary in 2004, defeated the more moderate Steve Huffman, a state representative, in the primary, in spite of ad buys in favor of Huffman by national Republicans.

==== Candidates ====
===== Nominee =====
- Randy Graf, former state representative and candidate for this seat in 2004

===== Eliminated in primary =====
- Frank Antenori, U.S. Army veteran
- Mike Hellon, former chair of the Arizona Republican Party
- Steve Huffman, state representative
- Michael T. Jenkins, automobile repair shop owner

===== Declined =====
- Jim Kolbe, incumbent U.S. Representative

==== Endorsements ====
Steve Huffman

U.S. Representatives

- Jim Kolbe, incumbent U.S. Representative

Organizations

- U.S. Chamber of Commerce

==== Results ====
Republican primary results
Party	Candidate	Votes	%
Republican	Randy Graf	27,063	41.6
Republican	Steve Huffman	24,119	37.1
Republican	Mike Hellon	9,095	14.0
Republican	Frank Antenori	2,724	4.2
Republican	Michael T. Jenkins	2,075	3.2
Total votes		65,076	100.0

=== Democratic primary ===
Former State Senator Gabby Giffords, a moderate Democrat, triumphed against several Democrats, the most notable of which was television anchor Patty Weiss, in the primary, and thus she and Graf faced off against each other in the general election.

==== Candidates ====
===== Nominee =====
- Gabby Giffords, former state senator

===== Eliminated in primary =====
- William Daniel Johnson, white nationalist activist
- Jeffrey Lynn Latas, U.S. Air Force veteran
- Alex Rodriguez, member of the Tucson Unified School District board
- Francine Shacter, former Democratic precinct chairwoman
- Patty Weiss, television anchor

==== Endorsements ====
Gabby Giffords

Individuals

- Wesley Clark, General, former Supreme Allied Commander Europe, 2004 democratic presidential candidate

==== Results ====
Democratic primary results
Party	Candidate	Votes	%
Democratic	Gabby Giffords	33,375	54.3
Democratic	Patty Weiss	19,148	31.2
Democratic	Jeffrey Lynn Latas	3,687	6.0
Democratic	Alex Rodriguez	2,855	4.6
Democratic	William Daniel Johnson	1,768	2.9
Democratic	Francine Shacter	576	0.9
Total votes		61,409	100.0

=== Libertarian primary ===
==== Candidates ====
===== Nominee =====
- David Nolan, co-founder of the Libertarian Party

==== Results ====
Libertarian primary results
Party	Candidate	Votes	%
Libertarian	David F. Nolan	516	100.0
Total votes		516	100.0

=== Independents ===
- Russ Dove (write-in), militiaman; campaign manager for William Daniel Johnson
- Leo F. Kimminau (write-in)
- Paul Price (write-in)
- Jay Quick (Independent), geologist and businessman

=== General election ===
==== Campaign ====
Giffords was the tentative favorite for most of the election, as many moderates were turned off by Graf's conservative views and Kolbe did not endorse him as the Republican candidate.

=== Debates ===
2006 Arizona's 8th congressional district general election debates
No.	Date & time	Host	Moderator	Link	Participants			
Key: P Participant A Absent N Non-invitee								
Key: P Participant A Absent N Non-invitee					Jay Quick	David F. Nolan	Gabby Giffords	Randy Graf
1	October 17, 2006	Access Tucson; Arizona Daily Star	Joe Birchall	Video	P	P	P	P

==== Polling ====
Poll source	Date(s) administered	Sample size	Margin of error	Randy Graf (R)	Gabby Giffords (D)	Others	Undecided
Reuters/Zogby	October 24–29, 2006	500 (LV)	±4.5%	41%	53%	2%	4%
Wick Communications	October 25–28, 2006	400 (LV)	±?%	35%	50%	4%	11%
Zimmerman & Associates and Marketing Intelligence (Arizona Daily Star/KVOA)	October 20–23, 2006	600 (LV)	±4.0%	38%	48%	4%	10%
Reuters/Zogby	September 25 – October 2, 2006	500 (LV)	±4.5%	37%	45%	2%	16%
Bennett, Petts & Normington (D)	September 19–21, 2006	400 (LV)	±?%	29%	54%	–	17%
Zimmerman & Associates and Marketing Intelligence (Arizona Daily Star/KVOA)	September 16–19, 2006	600 (LV)	±4.0%	36%	48%	3%	13%
Greenberg Quinlan Rosner Research (D-Giffords)	September 9–13, 2006	500 (LV)	±4.0%	35%	54%	5%	6%
Zimmerman & Associates and Marketing Intelligence (Arizona Daily Star)	September 1–4, 2006	800 (LV)	±4.9%	36%	46%	–	19%

==== Predictions ====
Source	Ranking	As of
The Cook Political Report	Lean D (flip)	November 6, 2006
Rothenberg	Likely D (flip)	November 6, 2006
Sabato's Crystal Ball	Likely D (flip)	November 6, 2006
Real Clear Politics	Lean D (flip)	November 7, 2006
CQ Politics	Likely D (flip)	November 7, 2006

==== Results ====
On election day, Giffords emerged victorious over Graf by a comfortable twelve-point margin and won her first term in Congress.

2006 Arizona’s 8th congressional district election
Party	Candidate	Votes	%
Democratic	Gabby Giffords	137,655	54.3
Republican	Randy Graf	106,790	42.1
Libertarian	David F. Nolan	4,849	1.9
Independent	Jay Dudley Quick	4,408	1.7
Write-ins	Russ Dove	7	0.0
Write-ins	Leo F. Kimminau	7	0.0
Write-ins	Paul Price	5	0.0
Total votes		253,720	100.0
Democratic gain from Republican			
