= 1972 United States House of Representatives elections in Arizona =

- November 7, 1972

All 4 Arizona seats to the United States House of Representatives
| | Majority party | Minority party |
|---|---|---|
| Party | Republican | Democratic |
| Last election | 2 | 1 |
| Seats won | 3 | 1 |
| Seat change | ▲1 | Steady |
| Popular vote | 309,862 | 284,045 |
| Percentage | 52.17% | 47.83% |
| Swing | ▼2.17% | ▲2.51% |

Republican hold Republican gain
Democratic hold
Republican
50–60%
60–70%
Democratic
60–70%

The 1972 United States House of Representatives elections in Arizona were held on November 7, 1972, to elect the four U.S. representatives from the state of Arizona, one from each of the state's eight congressional districts. The elections coincided with the 1972 U.S. presidential election, other elections to the House of Representatives, elections to the United States Senate, and various state and local elections.

This was the first election held following the 1970 United States census, as a result of which Arizona gained another seat in the House of Representatives. The fourth district was drawn to cover the northeast part of the state, stretching from the suburbs of Phoenix such as Scottsdale to the state's borders with New Mexico and Utah. Such a reapportionment faced a challenge in the Klahr v. Williams case, where it was argued that the fourth district was intentionally drawn to favor a Republican Representative. However, the United States District Court for the District of Arizona rejected the claim.

Republicans secured the fourth district in addition to holding onto the first and third districts, winning three seats out of four. Furthermore, they improved on their performances in the second and third districts compared to 1970's election despite recording a worse result in the first one.
