= 2004 United States House of Representatives elections in Arizona =

- November 2, 2004

All 8 Arizona seats to the United States House of Representatives
	Majority party	Minority party	Third party
Party	Republican	Democratic	Libertarian
Last election	6	2	0
Seats won	6	2	0
Seat change	Steady	Steady	Steady
Popular vote	1,127,591	597,526	146,316
Percentage	60.25%	31.93%	7.82%
Swing	▲3.16%	▼7.60%	▲4.45%

Republican
50–60%
60–70%
70–80%
80–90%
Democratic
40–50%
60–70%
70–80%

The 2004 congressional elections in Arizona were elections for Arizona's delegation to the United States House of Representatives, which occurred along with congressional elections nationwide on November 2, 2004. Arizona has eight seats, as apportioned during the 2000 United States census. Republicans held six of the eight seats and Democrats held two. This would be the last time until 2022 that Republicans would win six House seats in Arizona.

== Overview ==
=== Statewide ===
Party	Candidates	Votes		Seats		
Party	Candidates	No.	%	No.	+/–	%
Republican	8	1,127,591	60.25	6	Steady	75.00
Democratic	6	597,526	31.93	2	Steady	25.00
Libertarian	8	146,316	7.82	0	Steady	0.0
Write-in	1	12	0.00	0	Steady	0.0
Total	23	1,871,445	100.0	8	Steady	100.0

Popular vote
Republican	60.25%
Democratic	31.93%
Libertarian	7.82%
Other	0.00%

House seats
Republican	75.00%
Democratic	25.00%

=== By district ===
Results of the 2004 United States House of Representatives elections in Arizona by district:

District	Republican		Democratic		Libertarian		Others		Total		Result
District	Votes	%	Votes	%	Votes	%	Votes	%	Votes	%	Result
District 1	148,315	58.54%	91,776	36.22%	13,260	5.23%	0	0.00%	253,351	100.0%	Republican hold
District 2	165,260	59.17%	107,406	38.46%	6,625	2.37%	12	0.00%	279,303	100.0%	Republican hold
District 3	181,012	80.10%	0	0.00%	44,962	19.90%	0	0.00%	225,974	100.0%	Republican hold
District 4	28,238	25.66%	77,150	70.12%	4,639	4.22%	0	0.00%	110,027	100.0%	Democratic hold
District 5	159,455	59.50%	102,363	38.19%	6,189	2.31%	0	0.00%	268,007	100.0%	Republican hold
District 6	202,882	79.38%	0	0.00%	52,695	20.62%	0	0.00%	255,577	100.0%	Republican hold
District 7	59,066	33.67%	108,868	62.06%	7,503	4.28%	0	0.00%	175,437	100.0%	Democratic hold
District 8	183,363	60.36%	109,963	36.20%	10,443	3.44%	0	0.00%	303,769	100.0%	Republican hold
Total	1,127,591	60.25%	597,526	31.93%	146,316	7.82%	12	0.00%	1,871,445	100.0%	

== District 1 ==
2004 Arizona's 1st congressional district election
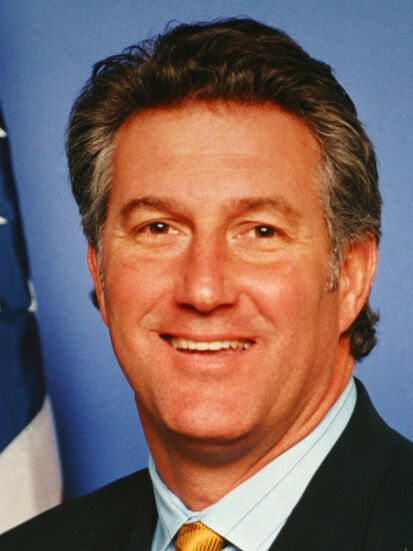

Nominee	Rick Renzi	Paul Babbitt	John Crockett
Party	Republican	Democratic	Libertarian
Popular vote	148,315	91,776	13,260
Percentage	58.5%	36.2%	5.2%
- County results Renzi: 50–60% 60–70% 70–80% Babbitt: 40–50%
U.S. Representative before election
Rick Renzi
Republican
Elected U.S. Representative
Rick Renzi
Republican

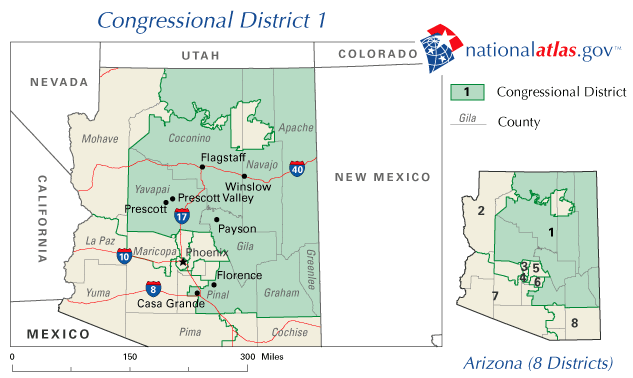
1st district

Incumbent Republican Rick Renzi, who had represented the district since 2003, ran for re-election. He was elected with 49.2% of the vote in 2002.

=== Republican primary ===
==== Candidates ====
===== Nominee =====
- Rick Renzi, incumbent U.S. Representative

==== Results ====
Republican primary results
Party	Candidate	Votes	%
Republican	Rick Renzi	36,723	100.0
Total votes		36,723	100.0

=== Democratic primary ===
==== Candidates ====
===== Nominee =====
- Paul Babbitt, Coconino County Supervisor, former Mayor of Flagstaff and brother of former Governor Bruce Babbitt

===== Eliminated in primary =====
- Bob Donahue, businessman

===== Withdrawn =====
- George Cordova, businessman and nominee for this seat in 2002
- Diane Prescott, lawyer, businesswoman and candidate for this seat in 2002

===== Declined =====
- Fred DuVal, former Clinton administration official and candidate for this seat in 2002
- Steve Udall, former Apache County Attorney and candidate for this seat in 2002

==== Results ====
Democratic primary results
Party	Candidate	Votes	%
Democratic	Paul Babbitt	35,422	73.7
Democratic	Bob Donahue	12,629	26.3
Total votes		48,051	100.0

=== Libertarian primary ===
==== Candidates ====
===== Nominee =====
- John Crocket

==== Results ====
Libertarian primary results
Party	Candidate	Votes	%
Libertarian	John Crocket	505	100.0
Total votes		505	100.0

=== General election ===
==== Campaign ====
As one of the few competitive races in nation, both sides spent heavily in the general election.

==== Endorsements ====
Paul Babbitt (D)

Organizations

- Democratic Congressional Campaign Committee "Red to Blue" Program

==== Polling ====
Poll source	Date(s) administered	Sample size	Margin of error	Rick Renzi (R)	Paul Babbitt (D)	John Crocket (L)	Undecided
Northern Arizona University	October 15–17, 2004	411 (LV)	±4.9%	53%	30%	3%	14%
Babbitt for Congress (D–Babbitt)	September 15, 2004	? (LV)	±%	41%	34%	3%	22%
Northern Arizona University	September 10–13, 2004	410 (LV)	±4.9%	51%	40%	1%	8%
Northern Arizona University	April 7–11, 2004	611 (LV)	±4.0%	49%	38%	1%	12%

==== Predictions ====
Source	Ranking	As of
The Cook Political Report	Lean R	October 29, 2004
Sabato's Crystal Ball	Tilt R	November 1, 2004

==== Results ====
Arizona's 1st congressional district election, 2004
Party	Candidate	Votes	%
Republican	Rick Renzi (incumbent)	148,315	58.5
Democratic	Paul Babbitt	91,776	36.2
Libertarian	John Crockett	13,260	5.2
Total votes		253,251	100.0
Republican hold			

== District 2 ==
2004 Arizona's 2nd congressional district election
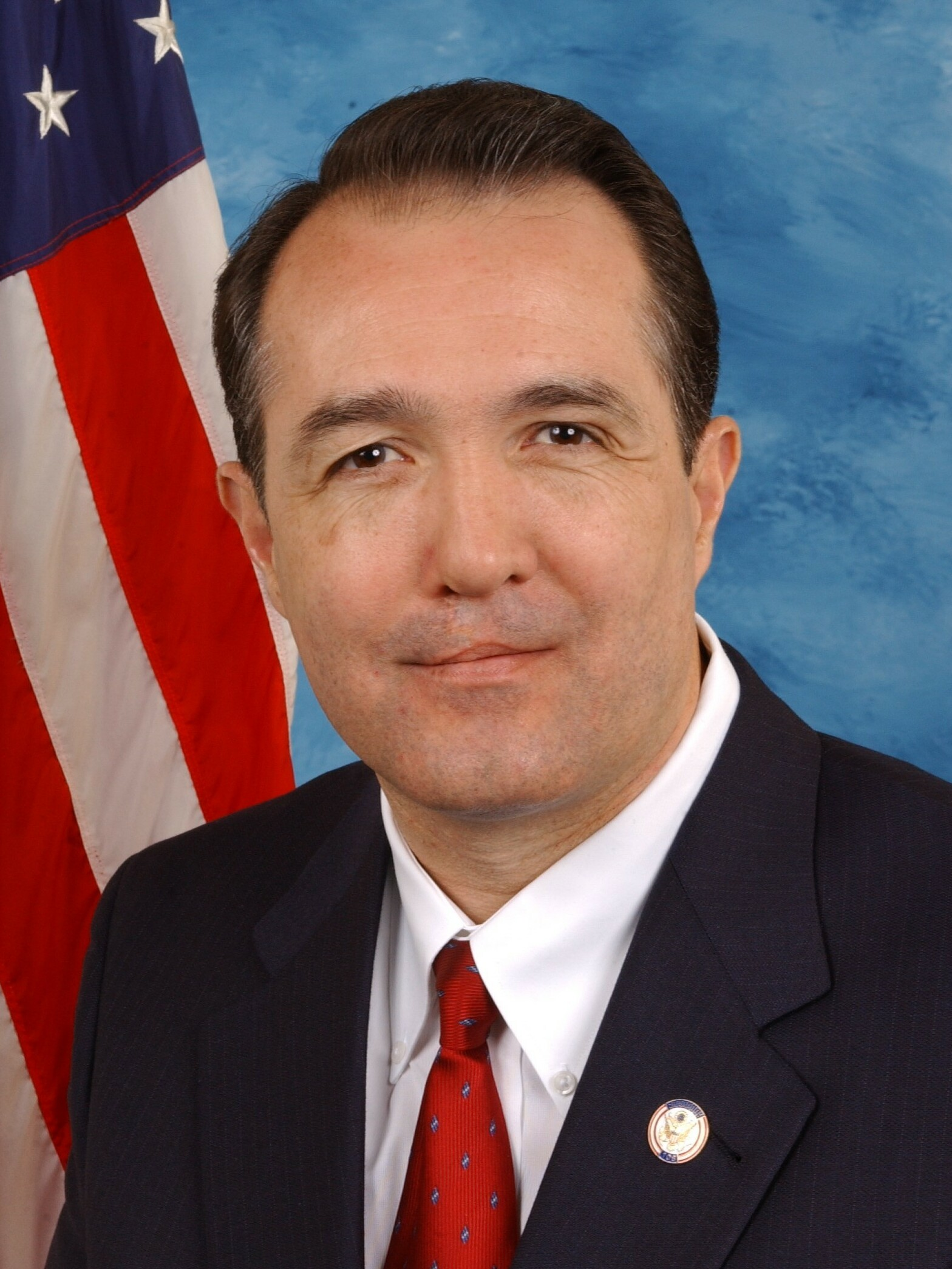

Nominee	Trent Franks	Randy Camacho
Party	Republican	Democratic
Popular vote	165,260	107,406
Percentage	59.2%	38.5%
- County results Franks: 50–60% 60–70% Camacho: 70–80% Tie: 40–50%
U.S. Representative before election
Trent Franks
Republican
Elected U.S. Representative
Trent Franks
Republican

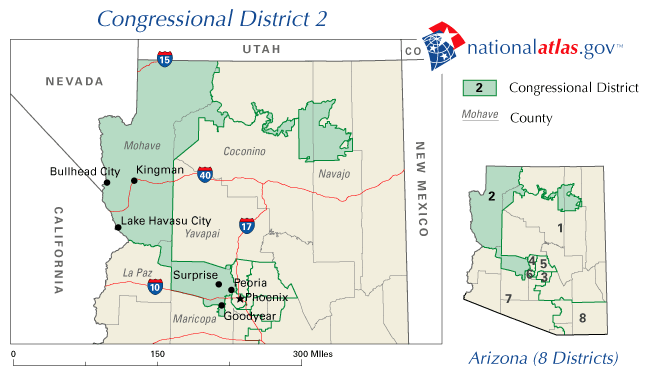
2nd district

Incumbent Republican Trent Franks, who had represented the district since 2002, ran for re-election. He was elected with 59.9% of the vote in 2002.

=== Republican primary ===
Franks was challenged by broadcasting executive Rick Murphy.

==== Results ====
Republican primary results
Party	Candidate	Votes	%
Republican	Trent Franks (incumbent)	45,261	63.6
Republican	Rick L. Murphy	25,871	36.4
Total votes		71,132	100.0

=== Democratic primary ===
==== Results ====
Democratic primary results
Party	Candidate	Votes	%
Democratic	Randy Camacho	12,833	52.7
Democratic	Gene Scharer	5,875	24.1
Democratic	Larry Coor	5,652	23.2
Total votes		24,360	100.0

=== Libertarian primary ===
==== Results ====
Libertarian primary results
Party	Candidate	Votes	%
Libertarian	Powell Gammill	365	100.0
Total votes		365	100.0

=== General election ===
==== Predictions ====
Source	Ranking	As of
The Cook Political Report	Safe R	October 29, 2004
Sabato's Crystal Ball	Safe R	November 1, 2004

==== Results ====
Arizona's 2nd congressional district election, 2004
Party	Candidate	Votes	%
Republican	Trent Franks (incumbent)	165,260	59.2
Democratic	Randy Camacho	107,406	38.5
Libertarian	Powell Gammill	6,625	2.4
Write-in		12	0.0
Total votes		279,303	100.0
Republican hold			

== District 3 ==
2004 Arizona's 3rd congressional district election
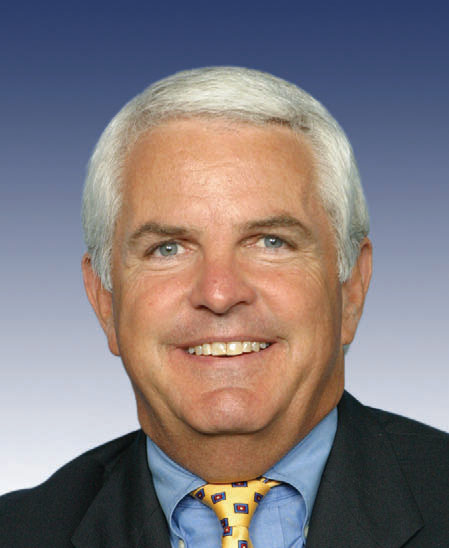

Nominee	John Shadegg	Mark Yannone
Party	Republican	Libertarian
Popular vote	181,012	44,962
Percentage	80.1%	19.9%
- County results Shadegg: 80–90%
U.S. Representative before election
John Shadegg
Republican
Elected U.S. Representative
John Shadegg
Republican

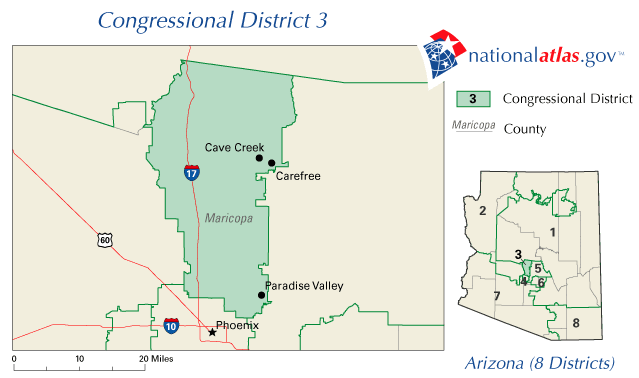
3rd district

Incumbent Republican John Shadegg, who had represented the district since 1994, ran for re-election. He was re-elected with 67.3% of the vote in 2002.

=== Republican primary ===
==== Results ====
Republican primary results
Party	Candidate	Votes	%
Republican	John Shadegg (incumbent)	43,552	100.0
Total votes		43,552	100.0

=== Democratic primary ===
No Democrats filed.

=== Libertarian primary ===
==== Results ====
Libertarian primary results
Party	Candidate	Votes	%
Libertarian	Mark Yannone	337	100.0
Total votes		337	100.0

=== General election ===
==== Predictions ====
Source	Ranking	As of
The Cook Political Report	Safe R	October 29, 2004
Sabato's Crystal Ball	Safe R	November 1, 2004

==== Results ====
Arizona's 3rd congressional district election, 2004
Party	Candidate	Votes	%
Republican	John Shadegg (incumbent)	181,012	80.1
Libertarian	Mark Yannone	44,962	19.9
Total votes		225,974	100.0
Republican hold			

== District 4 ==
2004 Arizona's 4th congressional district election
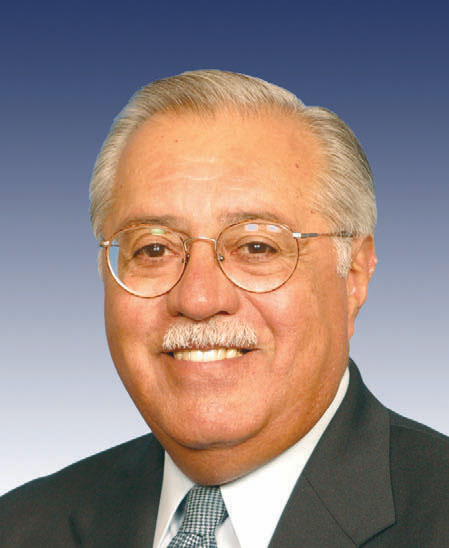

Nominee	Ed Pastor	Don Karg
Party	Democratic	Republican
Popular vote	77,150	28,238
Percentage	70.1%	25.7%
- County results Pastor: 70–80%
U.S. Representative before election
Ed Pastor
Democratic
Elected U.S. Representative
Ed Pastor
Democratic

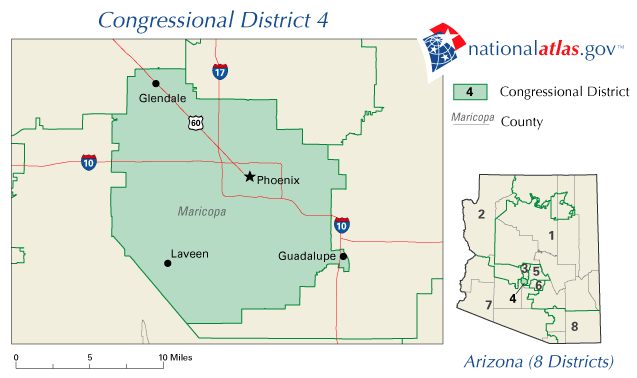
4th district

Incumbent Democrat Ed Pastor, who had represented the district since 1991, ran for re-election. He was re-elected with 67.4% of the vote in 2002.

=== Democratic primary ===
==== Results ====
Democratic primary results
Party	Candidate	Votes	%
Democratic	Ed Pastor (incumbent)	15,201	100.0
Total votes		15,201	100.0

=== Republican primary ===
==== Results ====
Republican primary results
Party	Candidate	Votes	%
Republican	Don Karg	8,854	100.0
Total votes		8,854	100.0

=== Libertarian primary ===
==== Results ====
Libertarian primary results
Party	Candidate	Votes	%
Libertarian	Gary Fallon	235	100.0
Total votes		235	100.0

=== General election ===
==== Predictions ====
Source	Ranking	As of
The Cook Political Report	Safe D	October 29, 2004
Sabato's Crystal Ball	Safe D	November 1, 2004

==== Results ====
Arizona's 4th congressional district election, 2004
Party	Candidate	Votes	%
Democratic	Ed Pastor (incumbent)	77,150	70.1
Republican	Don Karg	28,238	25.7
Libertarian	Gary Fallon	4,639	4.2
Total votes		110,027	100.0
Democratic hold			

== District 5 ==
2004 Arizona's 5th congressional district election
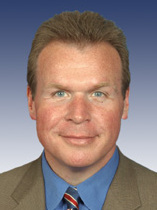

Nominee	J. D. Hayworth	Elizabeth Rogers
Party	Republican	Democratic
Popular vote	159,455	102,363
Percentage	59.5%	38.2%
- Hayworth: 40–50% 50–60% 60–70% 70–80% 80–90% >90% Rogers: 40–50% 50–60% 60–70% 70–80% Tie: 40–50% No votes
U.S. Representative before election
J. D. Hayworth
Republican
Elected U.S. Representative
J. D. Hayworth
Republican

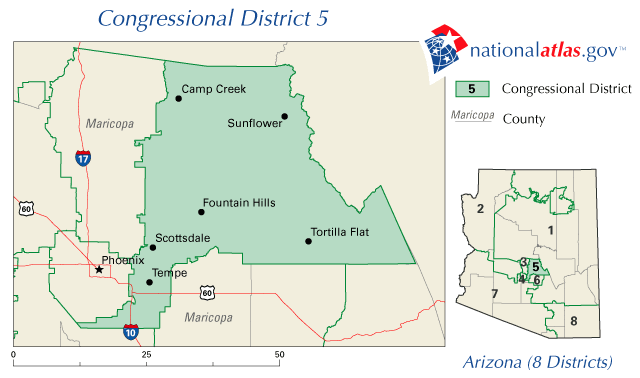
5th district

Incumbent Republican J. D. Hayworth, who had represented the district since 1994, ran for re-election. He was re-elected with 60.1% of the vote in 2002.

=== Republican primary ===
==== Results ====
Republican primary results
Party	Candidate	Votes	%
Republican	J. D. Hayworth (incumbent)	43,166	79.3
Republican	Roselyn O'Connell	11,296	20.7
Total votes		54,462	100.0

=== Democratic primary ===
==== Results ====
Democratic primary results
Party	Candidate	Votes	%
Democratic	Elizabeth Rogers	11,362	69.5
Democratic	Ronald Maynard	4,985	30.5
Total votes		16,347	100.0

=== Libertarian primary ===
==== Results ====
Libertarian primary results
Party	Candidate	Votes	%
Libertarian	Michael Kielsky	330	100.0
Total votes		330	100.0

=== General election ===
==== Predictions ====
Source	Ranking	As of
The Cook Political Report	Safe R	October 29, 2004
Sabato's Crystal Ball	Safe R	November 1, 2004

==== Results ====
Arizona's 5th congressional district election, 2004
Party	Candidate	Votes	%
Republican	J. D. Hayworth (incumbent)	159,455	59.5
Democratic	Elizabeth Rogers	102,363	38.2
Libertarian	Michael Kielsky	6,189	2.3
Total votes		268,007	100.0
Republican hold			

== District 6 ==
2004 Arizona's 6th congressional district election
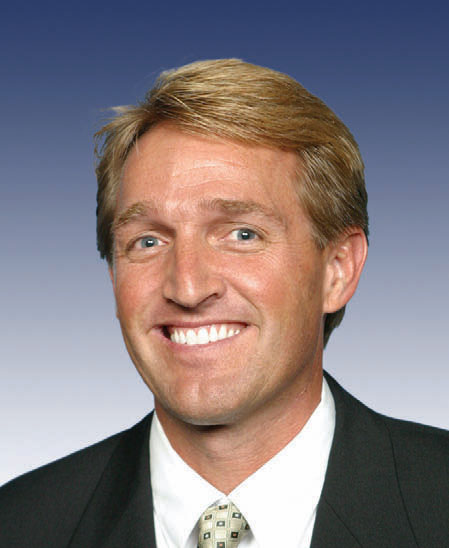

Nominee	Jeff Flake	Craig Stritar
Party	Republican	Libertarian
Popular vote	202,882	51,285
Percentage	79.4%	20.6%
- County results Flake: 70–80%
U.S. Representative before election
Jeff Flake
Republican
Elected U.S. Representative
Jeff Flake
Republican

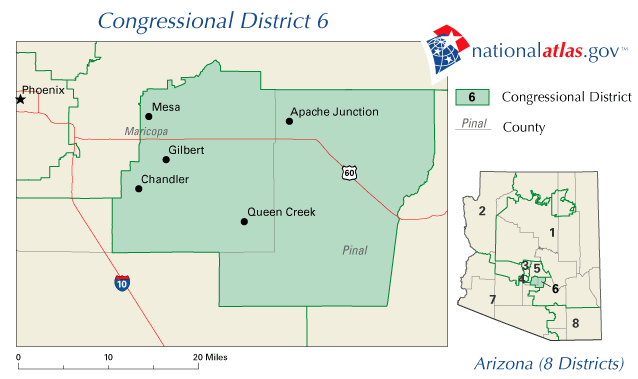
6th district

Incumbent Republican Jeff Flake, who had represented the district since 2001, ran for re-election. He was elected with 65.9% of the vote in 2002.

=== Republican primary ===
Former state senator Stan Barnes ran against Flake.

==== Results ====
Republican primary results
Party	Candidate	Votes	%
Republican	Jeff Flake (incumbent)	33,784	59.3
Republican	Stan Barnes	23,186	40.7
Total votes		56,970	100.0

=== Democratic primary ===
No Democrats filed.

=== Libertarian primary ===
==== Results ====
Libertarian primary results
Party	Candidate	Votes	%
Libertarian	Craig Stritar	272	100.0
Total votes		272	100.0

=== General election ===
==== Predictions ====
Source	Ranking	As of
The Cook Political Report	Safe R	October 29, 2004
Sabato's Crystal Ball	Safe R	November 1, 2004

==== Results ====
Arizona's 6th congressional district election, 2004
Party	Candidate	Votes	%
Republican	Jeff Flake (incumbent)	202,882	79.4
Libertarian	Craig Stritar	52,695	20.6
Total votes		255,577	100.0
Republican hold			

== District 7 ==
2004 Arizona's 7th congressional district election
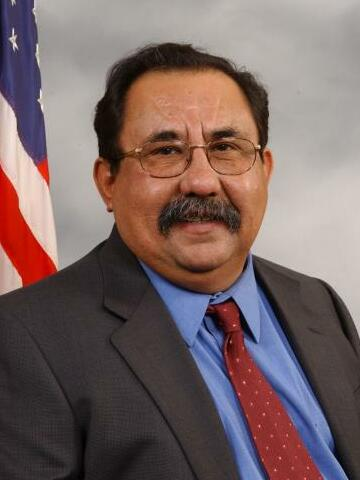

Nominee	Raúl Grijalva	Joseph Sweeney
Party	Democratic	Republican
Popular vote	108,868	59,066
Percentage	62.1%	33.7%
- County results Grijalva: 40–50% 70–80% Drake: 50–60%
U.S. Representative before election
Raúl Grijalva
Democratic
Elected U.S. Representative
Raúl Grijalva
Democratic

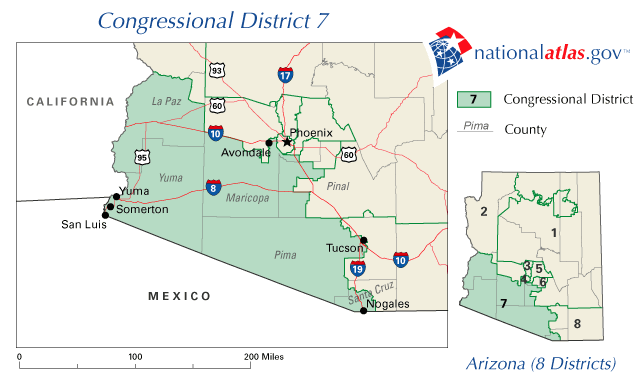
7th district

Incumbent Democrat Raúl Grijalva, who had represented the district since 2003, ran for re-election. He was elected with 59.0% of the vote in 2002.

=== Democratic primary ===
==== Results ====
Democratic primary results
Party	Candidate	Votes	%
Democratic	Raúl Grijalva (incumbent)	26,450	100.0
Total votes		26,450	100.0

=== Republican primary ===
==== Results ====
Republican primary results
Party	Candidate	Votes	%
Republican	Joseph Sweeney	11,990	70.1
Republican	Lou Muñoz	5,107	29.9
Total votes		17,097	100.0

=== Libertarian primary ===
==== Results ====
Libertarian primary results
Party	Candidate	Votes	%
Libertarian	Dave Kaplan	294	100.0
Total votes		294	100.0

=== General election ===
==== Predictions ====
Source	Ranking	As of
The Cook Political Report	Safe D	October 29, 2004
Sabato's Crystal Ball	Safe D	November 1, 2004

==== Results ====
Arizona's 7th congressional district election, 2004
Party	Candidate	Votes	%
Democratic	Raúl Grijalva (incumbent)	108,868	62.1
Republican	Joseph Sweeney	59,066	33.7
Libertarian	Dave Kaplan	7,503	4.3
Total votes		175,437	100.0
Democratic hold			

== District 8 ==
2004 Arizona's 8th congressional district election
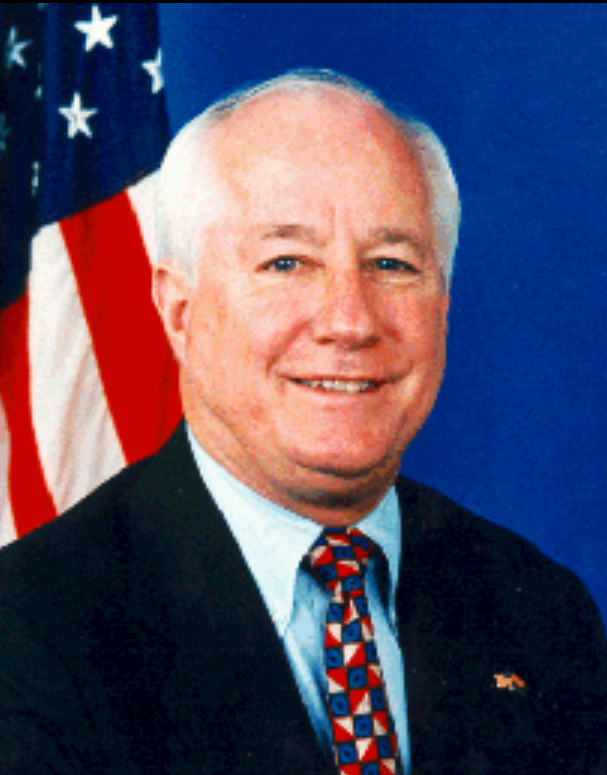

Nominee	Jim Kolbe	Eva Bacal
Party	Republican	Democratic
Popular vote	183,363	109,963
Percentage	60.4%	36.2%
- County results Kolbe: 50–60% 60–70%
U.S. Representative before election
Jim Kolbe
Republican
Elected U.S. Representative
Jim Kolbe
Republican

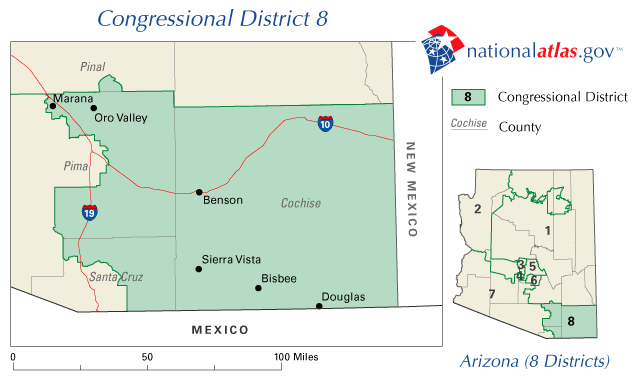
8th district

Incumbent Republican Jim Kolbe, who had represented the district since 1984, ran for re-election. He was re-elected with 63.3% of the vote in 2002.

=== Republican primary ===
Kolbe faced a serious primary challenge for the first time since winning the seat in 1984 from state representative Randy Graf. Graf ran well to Kolbe's right, with a message to "get tough" on illegal immigration, a "hot button" issue, especially for residents living along Arizona's border with Mexico, which has become a major crossing point for smuggling. He also aligned himself with U.S. Representatives Tom Tancredo of Colorado and Steve King of Iowa, who proposed enhanced border security. Graf was also a senior advisor for Proposition 200, an initiative passed by Arizona voters in 2004 to prevent welfare and voter fraud. He was also anti-abortion, against same-sex marriage, in favor of continued U.S. support for Israel, and in favor of tort reforms and medical care choice as a way of lowering health insurance rates.

==== Results ====
Republican primary results
Party	Candidate	Votes	%
Republican	Jim Kolbe (incumbent)	36,039	57.5
Republican	Randy Graf	26,686	42.5
Total votes		62,725	100.0

=== Democratic primary ===
==== Results ====
Democratic primary results
Party	Candidate	Votes	%
Democratic	Eva Bacal	20,216	58.6
Democratic	Tim Sultan	9,177	26.6
Democratic	Jeffrey Chimene	5,093	14.8
Total votes		34,486	100.0

=== Libertarian primary ===
==== Results ====
Libertarian primary results
Party	Candidate	Votes	%
Libertarian	Robert Anderson	385	100.0
Total votes		385	100.0

=== General election ===
==== Predictions ====
Source	Ranking	As of
The Cook Political Report	Safe R	October 29, 2004
Sabato's Crystal Ball	Safe R	November 1, 2004

==== Results ====
Arizona's 8th congressional district election, 2004
Party	Candidate	Votes	%
Republican	Jim Kolbe (incumbent)	183,363	60.4
Democratic	Eva Bacal	109,963	36.2
Libertarian	Robert Anderson	10,443	3.4
Total votes		303,769	100.0
Republican hold			
