= 2002 United States House of Representatives elections in Arizona =

- November 5, 2002

All 8 Arizona seats to the United States House of Representatives
- Turnout: 56.33%
	Majority party	Minority party
Party	Republican	Democratic
Last election	5	1
Seats won	6	2
Seat change	▲1	▲1
Popular vote	681,922	472,135
Percentage	57.09%	39.53%
Swing	▼1.23%	▲1.47%

Republican
40–50%
50–60%
60–70%
Democratic
40–50%
50–60%
60–70%
70–80%

The 2002 congressional elections in Arizona were elections for Arizona's delegation to the United States House of Representatives, which occurred along with congressional elections nationwide on November 5, 2002. Arizona has eight seats, as apportioned during the 2000 United States census and thus gaining two since the previous election. Democrats and Republicans each gained a seat as result, with Republicans having six seats and Democrats having two seats.

== Overview ==
=== Statewide ===
Party	Candidates	Votes		Seats		
Party	Candidates	No.	%	No.	+/–	%
Republican	8	681,922	57.09	6	▲1	75.00
Democratic	8	472,135	39.53	2	▲1	25.00
Libertarian	8	40,308	3.37	0	Steady	0.0
Write-in	2	35	0.00	0	Steady	0.0
Total	26	1,194,400	100.0	8	▲2	100.0

Popular vote
Republican	57.09%
Democratic	39.53%
Libertarian	3.37%
Other	0.00%

House seats
Republican	75.00%
Democratic	25.00%

=== By district ===
Results of the 2002 United States House of Representatives elections in Arizona by district:

District	Republican		Democratic		Others		Total		Result
District	Votes	%	Votes	%	Votes	%	Votes	%	Result
District 1	85,967	49.21%	79,730	45.64%	8,990	5.15%	174,687	100.0%	Republican Win
District 2	100,359	59.92%	61,217	36.55%	5,926	3.54%	167,502	100.0%	Republican hold
District 3	104,847	67.32%	47,173	30.29%	3,731	2.40%	155,751	100.0%	Republican hold
District 4	18,381	27.82%	44,517	67.38%	3,167	4.79%	66,065	100.0%	Democratic Win
District 5	103,870	61.17%	61,559	36.25%	4,383	2.58%	169,812	100.0%	Republican hold
District 6	103,094	65.94%	49,355	31.57%	3,888	2.49%	156,337	100.0%	Republican hold
District 7	38,474	37.06%	61,256	59.00%	4,088	3.94%	103,818	100.0%	Democratic hold
District 8	126,930	63.33%	67,328	33.59%	6,170	3.08%	200,428	100.0%	Republican hold
Total	681,922	57.09%	472,135	39.53%	40,343	3.38%	1,194,400	100.0%	

== District 1 ==
2002 Arizona's 1st congressional district election
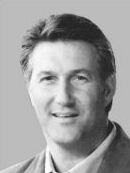

Nominee	Rick Renzi	George Cordova	Edwin Porr
Party	Republican	Democratic	Libertarian
Popular vote	85,967	79,730	8,990
Percentage	49.2%	45.6%	5.2%
- County results Renzi: 40–50% 50–60% 60–70% Cordova: 40–50% 50–60% 70–80%
U.S. Representative before election
None
(New district)
Elected U.S. Representative
Rick Renzi
Republican

The new 1st district contained much of North and East Arizona including: Apache County, Gila County, Graham County, Greenlee County, Yavapai County, and parts of Coconino County, Navajo County, and Pinal County.

=== Republican primary ===
==== Results ====
Insurance executive Rick Renzi defeated five other Republicans including Sydney Hay to win the nomination.

Republican primary results
Party	Candidate	Votes	%
Republican	Rick Renzi	11,379	24.4
Republican	Lewis Tenney	9,569	20.5
Republican	Sydney Hay	9,550	20.5
Republican	Alan Everett	7,321	15.7
Republican	Bruce Whiting	6,872	14.8
Republican	David Stafford	1,894	4.1
Total votes		46,585	100.0

=== Democratic primary ===
==== Results ====
Businessman George Cordova upset Stephen Udall and Fred DuVal to win the Democratic nomination.

Democratic primary results
Party	Candidate	Votes	%
Democratic	George Cordova	11,689	21.7
Democratic	Stephen Udall	10,690	19.9
Democratic	Diane Prescott	9,629	17.9
Democratic	Fred DuVal	8,648	16.1
Democratic	Derrick Watchman	7,326	13.6
Democratic	Sam Martinez	4,908	9.1
Democratic	Roger Hartstone	922	1.1
Total votes		53,812	100.0

=== Libertarian primary ===
==== Results ====
Libertarian primary results
Party	Candidate	Votes	%
Libertarian	Edwin Porr	286	54.1
Libertarian	Andy Fernandez	243	45.9
Total votes		529	100.0

=== General Election ===
==== Polling ====
Poll source	Date(s) administered	Sample size	Margin of error	Rick Renzi (R)	George Cordova (D)	Edwin Porr (L)	Undecided
Northern Arizona University	October 17–20, 2002	600 (LV)	±4.1%	48%	36%	4%	12%
Northern Arizona University	September 12–14, 2002	803 (LV)	±3.5%	37%	37%	3%	23%

==== Predictions ====
Source	Ranking	As of
Sabato's Crystal Ball	Lean R	November 4, 2002
New York Times	Tossup	October 14, 2002

==== Results ====
Arizona's 1st congressional district election, 2002
Party	Candidate	Votes	%
Republican	Rick Renzi	85,967	49.2
Democratic	George Cordova	79,730	45.6
Libertarian	Edwin Porr	8,990	5.2
Majority		6,237	3.6
Total votes		174,687	100.0
Republican win (new seat)			

== District 2 ==
2002 Arizona's 2nd congressional district election
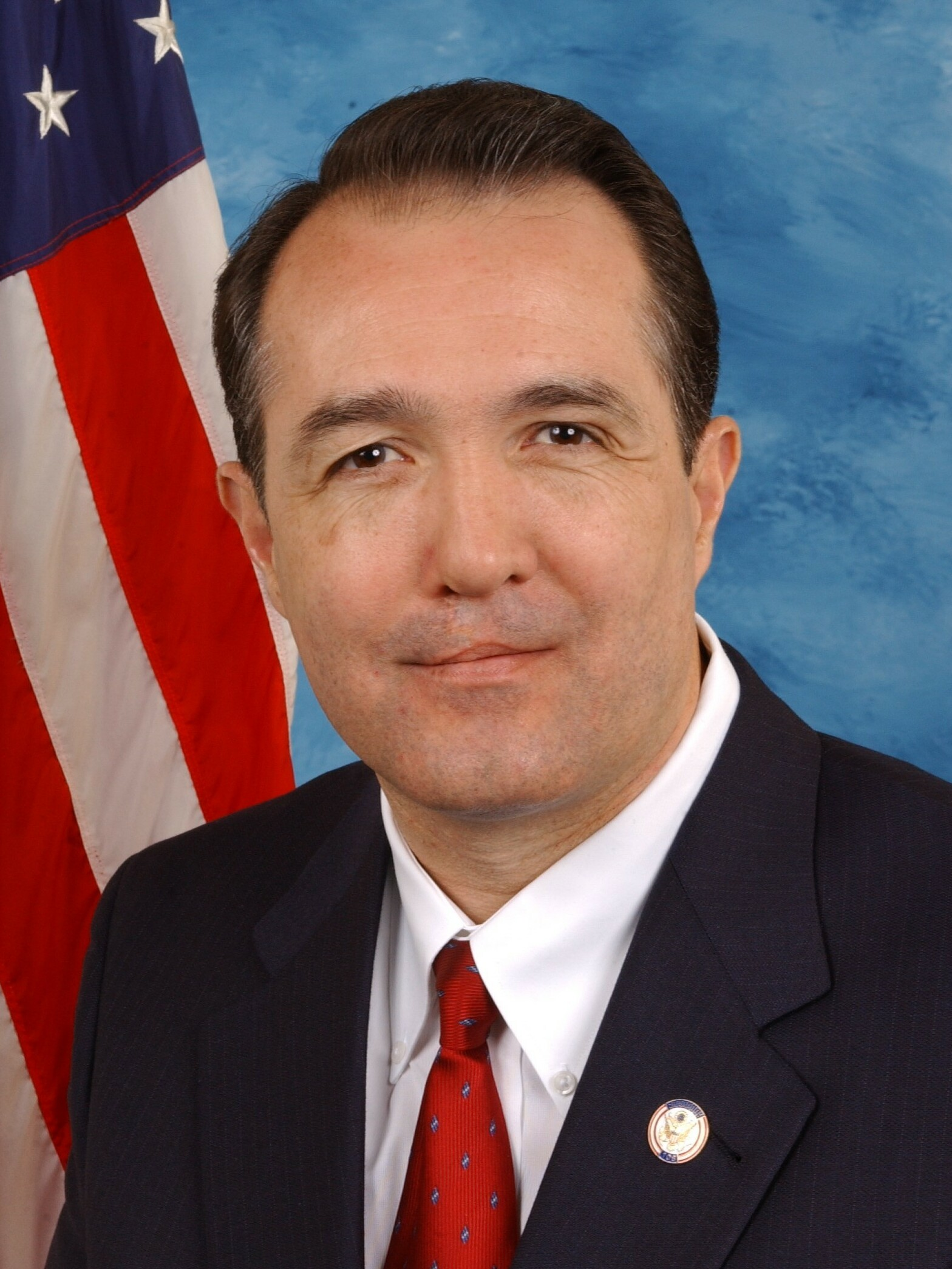

Nominee	Trent Franks	Randy Camacho
Party	Republican	Democratic
Popular vote	100,359	61,217
Percentage	59.9%	36.6%
- County results Franks: 50–60% 60–70% Camacho: 70–80%
U.S. Representative before election
Bob Stump (3rd)
Republican
Elected U.S. Representative
Trent Franks
Republican

After redistricting much of the old 3rd district was reconfigured to be the new 2nd. This consisted of parts of Metro Phoenix, extending to North West Arizona, plus the Hopi Reservation including: Mohave County and parts of Coconino County, La Paz County, Maricopa County and Navajo County. Incumbent Republican Bob Stump, who had represented the district since 1977, did not run for re-election. He was re-elected with 65.7% of the vote in 2000.

=== Republican primary ===
==== Candidates ====
Stump endorsed his longtime chief of staff Lisa Atkins to replace him. In total seven Republicans ran in the September 10 Primary, including Oilman and former state representative Trent Franks.

==== Results ====
Franks narrowly defeated Atkins 28–26%, a difference of just 797 votes.

Republican primary results
Party	Candidate	Votes	%
Republican	Trent Franks	14,749	27.7
Republican	Lisa Atkins	13,952	26.2
Republican	John Keegan	10,560	19.8
Republican	Scott Bundgaard	8,701	16.3
Republican	Dusko Jovicic	3,805	7.1
Republican	Mike Schaefer	933	1.8
Republican	Dick Hensky	618	1.2
Total votes		52,700	100.0

=== Democratic primary ===
==== Results ====
Democratic primary results
Party	Candidate	Votes	%
Democratic	Randy Camacho	6,507	33.0
Democratic	Elizabeth Farley	5,994	30.4
Democratic	Sandy Reagan	3,857	19.6
Democratic	Linda Calvert	3,323	16.9
Democratic	Gene Scharer (write-in)	28	0.1
Total votes		19,709	100.0

=== Libertarian primary ===
==== Results ====
Libertarian primary results
Party	Candidate	Votes	%
Libertarian	Edward Carlson	307	100.0
Total votes		307	100.0

=== General Election ===
==== Predictions ====
Source	Ranking	As of
Sabato's Crystal Ball	Safe R	November 4, 2002
New York Times	Safe R	October 14, 2002

==== Results ====
Arizona's 2nd congressional district election, 2002
Party	Candidate	Votes	%
Republican	Trent Franks	100,359	59.9
Democratic	Randy Camacho	61,217	36.6
Libertarian	Edward Carlson	5,919	3.5
Write-In	William Crum	7	0.0
Majority		39,142	23.4
Total votes		167,502	100.0
Republican hold			

== District 3 ==
2002 Arizona's 3rd congressional district election
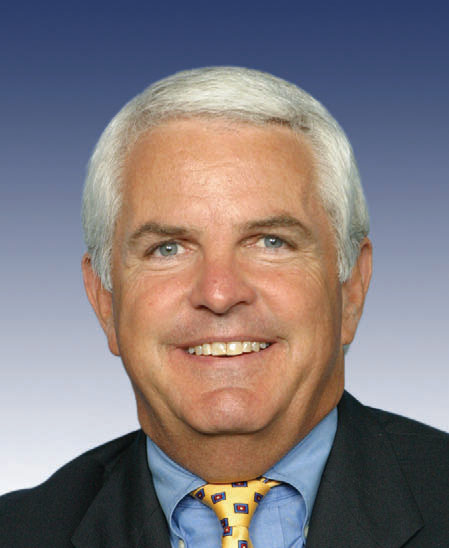

Nominee	John Shadegg	Charles Hill
Party	Republican	Democratic
Popular vote	104,847	47,173
Percentage	67.3%	30.3%
- County results Shadegg: 60–70%
U.S. Representative before election
John Shadegg (4th)
Republican
Elected U.S. Representative
John Shadegg
Republican

After redistricting much of the old 4th district was reconfigured to be the new 3rd. This consisted solely of parts of Metro Phoenix, including Glendale. Incumbent Republican John Shadegg, who had represented the district since 1995, ran for re-election. He was re-elected with 64.0% of the vote in 2000.

=== Republican primary ===
==== Results ====
Republican primary results
Party	Candidate	Votes	%
Republican	John Shadegg (incumbent)	36,500	100.0
Total votes		36,500	100.0

=== Democratic primary ===
==== Results ====
Democratic primary results
Party	Candidate	Votes	%
Democratic	Charles Hill	14,336	100.0
Total votes		14,336	100.0

=== Libertarian primary ===
==== Results ====
Libertarian primary results
Party	Candidate	Votes	%
Libertarian	Mark Yannone	186	58.1
Libertarian	Edward Gaudreau	134	41.9
Total votes		320	100.0

=== General Election ===
==== Predictions ====
Source	Ranking	As of
Sabato's Crystal Ball	Safe R	November 4, 2002
New York Times	Safe R	October 14, 2002

==== Results ====
Arizona's 3rd congressional district election, 2002
Party	Candidate	Votes	%
Republican	John Shadegg (incumbent)	104,847	67.3
Democratic	Charles Hill	47,173	30.3
Libertarian	Mark Yannone	3,731	2.4
Majority		57,674	37.0
Total votes		155,751	100.0
Republican hold			

== District 4 ==
2002 Arizona's 4th congressional district election
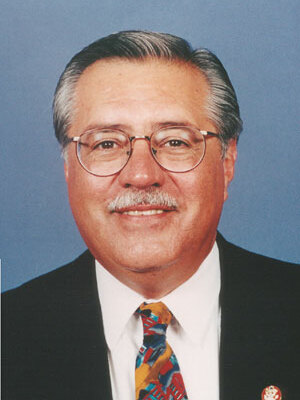

Nominee	Ed Pastor	Jonathan Barnert
Party	Democratic	Republican
Popular vote	44,517	18,381
Percentage	67.4%	27.8%
- County results Pastor: 60–70%
U.S. Representative before election
None
(New district)
Elected U.S. Representative
Ed Pastor
Democratic

The new 4th district contained heavily Latino portions of inner Phoenix. This district was the only safe Democratic district in the Phoenix area. Ed Pastor the incumbent from the old 2nd district (which had been renumbered the 7th), had seen his home in Phoenix drawn into the new 4th and so opted to seek re-election there.

=== Democratic primary ===
==== Results ====
Democratic primary results
Party	Candidate	Votes	%
Democratic	Ed Pastor (incumbent)	17,051	100.0
Total votes		17,051	100.0

=== Republican primary ===
==== Results ====
Republican primary results
Party	Candidate	Votes	%
Republican	Jonathan Barnert	5,616	74.6
Republican	Don Karg	1,913	25.4
Total votes		7,529	100.0

=== Libertarian primary ===
==== Results ====
Libertarian primary results
Party	Candidate	Votes	%
Libertarian	Amy Gibbons (write-in)	20	87.0
Libertarian	Richard Sutton (write-in)	3	13.0
Total votes		23	100.0

=== General Election ===
==== Predictions ====
Source	Ranking	As of
Sabato's Crystal Ball	Safe D	November 4, 2002
New York Times	Safe D	October 14, 2002

==== Results ====
Arizona's 4th congressional district election, 2002
Party	Candidate	Votes	%
Democratic	Ed Pastor (incumbent)	44,517	67.4
Republican	Jonathan Barnert	18,381	27.8
Libertarian	Amy Gibbons	3,167	4.8
Majority		26,136	39.6
Total votes		66,065	100.0
Democratic win (new seat)			

== District 5 ==
2002 Arizona's 5th congressional district election
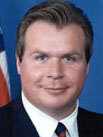

Nominee	J. D. Hayworth	Craig Columbus
Party	Republican	Democratic
Popular vote	103,870	61,559
Percentage	61.2%	36.3%
- Precinct results Hayworth: 40–50% 50–60% 60–70% 70–80% 80–90% 90–100% Columbus: 40–50% 50–60% 60–70% Tie: 40–50% 50%
U.S. Representative before election
J. D. Hayworth (6th)
Republican
Elected U.S. Representative
J. D. Hayworth
Republican

After redistricting much of the old 6th district was reconfigured to be the new 5th. This consisted solely of parts of Metro Phoenix, including all of Tempe and Scottsdale and portions of Chandler, Mesa and the Ahwatukee section of Phoenix. Although Republicans outnumbered Democrats by about 40,000 voters, the 5th district was considered far less conservative than other suburban Phoenix districts. Incumbent Republican J.D. Hayworth, who had represented the district since 1995, ran for re-election. He was re-elected with 61.4% of the vote in 2000.

=== Republican primary ===
==== Results ====
Republican primary results
Party	Candidate	Votes	%
Republican	J.D. Hayworth (incumbent)	37,325	100.0
Total votes		37,325	100.0

=== Democratic primary ===
==== Results ====
Democratic primary results
Party	Candidate	Votes	%
Democratic	Craig Columbus	8,147	49.0
Democratic	Larry King	4,903	29.5
Democratic	Ronald E. Maynard	3,567	21.5
Total votes		16,617	100.0

=== Libertarian primary ===
==== Results ====
Libertarian primary results
Party	Candidate	Votes	%
Libertarian	Warren Severin (write-in)	64	100.0
Total votes		64	100.0

=== General Election ===
==== Predictions ====
Source	Ranking	As of
Sabato's Crystal Ball	Safe R	November 4, 2002
New York Times	Safe R	October 14, 2002

==== Results ====
Arizona's 5th congressional district election, 2002
Party	Candidate	Votes	%
Republican	J.D. Hayworth (incumbent)	103,870	61.2
Democratic	Chris Columbus	61,559	36.3
Libertarian	Warren Severin	4,383	2.6
Majority		42,311	24.9
Total votes		169,812	100.0
Republican hold			

== District 6 ==
2002 Arizona's 6th congressional district election

Nominee	Jeff Flake	Deborah Thomas
Party	Republican	Democratic
Popular vote	103,094	49,355
Percentage	65.9%	31.6%
- County results Flake: 50–60% 60–70%
U.S. Representative before election
Jeff Flake (1st)
Republican
Elected U.S. Representative
Jeff Flake
Republican

After redistricting much of the old 1st district was reconfigured to be the new 6th. It included parts of Mesa, Chandler and all of Gilbert as well as the fast-growing town of Queen Creek. It also contained the city of Apache Junction in Pinal County. Incumbent Republican Jeff Flake, who had represented the district since 2001, ran for re-election. He was elected with 53.6% of the vote in 2000.

=== Republican primary ===
==== Results ====
Republican primary results
Party	Candidate	Votes	%
Republican	Jeff Flake (incumbent)	41,025	100.0
Total votes		41,025	100.0

=== Democratic primary ===
==== Results ====
Democratic primary results
Party	Candidate	Votes	%
Democratic	Deborah Thomas	13,720	100.0
Total votes		13,720	100.0

=== Libertarian primary ===
==== Results ====
Libertarian primary results
Party	Candidate	Votes	%
Libertarian	Andy Wagner (write-in)	4	100.0
Total votes		4	100.0

=== General Election ===
==== Predictions ====
Source	Ranking	As of
Sabato's Crystal Ball	Safe R	November 4, 2002
New York Times	Safe R	October 14, 2002

==== Results ====
Arizona's 6th congressional district election, 2002
Party	Candidate	Votes	%
Republican	Jeff Flake (incumbent)	103,094	65.9
Democratic	Deborah Thomas	49,355	31.6
Libertarian	Andy Wagner	3,888	2.5
Majority		53,739	34.4
Total votes		156,337	100.0
Republican hold			

== District 7 ==
2002 Arizona's 7th congressional district election
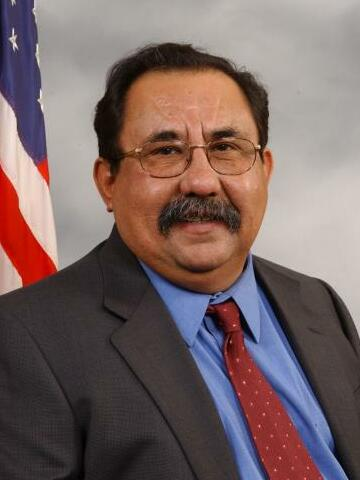

Nominee	Raúl Grijalva	Ross Hieb
Party	Democratic	Republican
Popular vote	61,256	38,474
Percentage	59.0%	37.1%
- County results Grijalva: 40–50% 60–70% 70–80% Hieb: 50–60%
U.S. Representative before election
Ed Pastor (2nd)
Democratic
Elected U.S. Representative
Raúl Grijalva
Democratic

After redistricting much of the old 2nd district was reconfigured to be the new 7th. This consisted of South Western Arizona, including Yuma and parts of Tucson, La Paz Maricopa, Pima, Pinal and Santa Cruz. Incumbent Democrat Ed Pastor, who had represented the district since 1991, ran for re-election in the 4th district leaving the 7th as an open seat. He was re-elected with 68.5% of the vote in 2000.

=== Democratic primary ===
Former Pima County supervisor Raúl Grijalva defeated seven other Democrats, including state senator Elaine Richardson & former state senator Jaime Gutierrez.

==== Results ====
Democratic primary results
Party	Candidate	Votes	%
Democratic	Raúl Grijalva	14,835	40.9
Democratic	Elaine Richardson	7,589	20.9
Democratic	Jaime Gutierrez	5,401	14.9
Democratic	Lisa Otondo	2,302	6.3
Democratic	Luis Armando Gonzales	2,105	5.8
Democratic	Mark Fleisher	2,022	5.6
Democratic	Sherry Smith	1,058	2.9
Democratic	Jésus Romo	1,008	2.8
Total votes		36,320	100.0

=== Republican primary ===
==== Results ====
Republican primary results
Party	Candidate	Votes	%
Republican	Ross Hieb	6,426	39.8
Republican	Joseph Sweeney	4,781	29.6
Republican	Al Piña	2,372	16.9
Republican	Lori Lustig	2,207	13.7
Total votes		15,786	100.0

=== Libertarian primary ===
==== Results ====
Libertarian primary results
Party	Candidate	Votes	%
Libertarian	John L. Nemeth	312	100.0
Total votes		312	100.0

=== General Election ===
==== Predictions ====
Source	Ranking	As of
Sabato's Crystal Ball	Safe D (flip)	November 4, 2002
New York Times	Safe D (flip)	October 14, 2002

==== Results ====
Arizona's 7th congressional district election, 2002
Party	Candidate	Votes	%
Democratic	Raúl Grijalva	61,256	59.0
Republican	Ross Hieb	38,474	37.1
Libertarian	John L. Nemeth	4,088	3.9
Majority		22,782	21.9
Total votes		103,818	100.0
Democratic win (new seat)			

== District 8 ==
2002 Arizona's 8th congressional district election
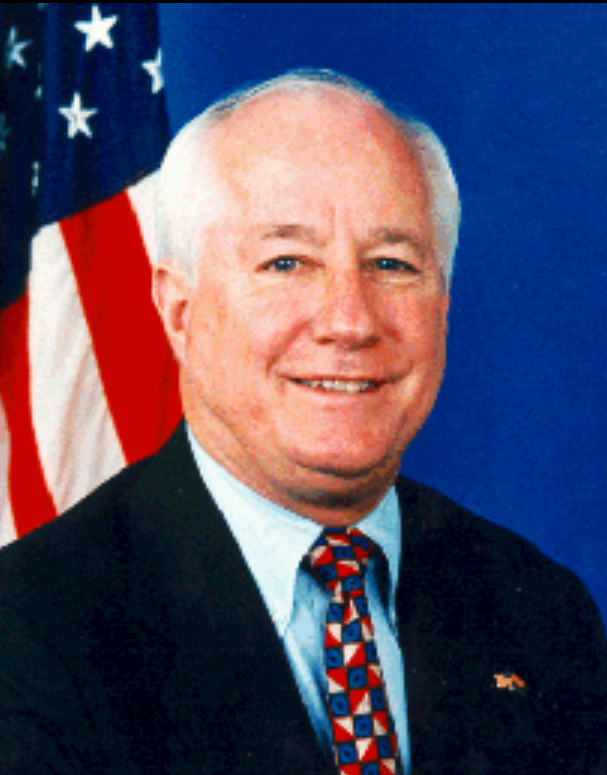

Nominee	Jim Kolbe	Mary Judge Ryan
Party	Republican	Democratic
Popular vote	126,930	67,328
Percentage	63.3%	33.6%
- County results Kolbe: 60–70% 70–80%
U.S. Representative before election
Jim Kolbe (5th)
Republican
Elected U.S. Representative
Jim Kolbe
Republican

After redistricting much of the old 5th district was reconfigured to be the new 8th. This consisted of Southeastern Arizona including all of Cochise County and parts of Pima, Pinal and Santa Cruz counties. Incumbent Republican Jim Kolbe, who had represented the district since 1985, ran for re-election. He was re-elected with 60.2% of the vote in 2000.

=== Republican primary ===
==== Results ====
Republican primary results
Party	Candidate	Votes	%
Republican	Jim Kolbe (incumbent)	35,546	72.5
Republican	James Behnke	13,502	27.5
Total votes		49,048	100.0

=== Democratic primary ===
==== Results ====
Democratic primary results
Party	Candidate	Votes	%
Democratic	Mary Judge Ryan	32,322	100.0
Total votes		32,322	100.0

=== Libertarian primary ===
==== Results ====
Libertarian primary results
Party	Candidate	Votes	%
Libertarian	Joe Duarte	453	100.0
Total votes		453	100.0

=== General Election ===
==== Predictions ====
Source	Ranking	As of
Sabato's Crystal Ball	Safe R	November 4, 2002
New York Times	Safe R	October 14, 2002

==== Results ====
Arizona's 8th congressional district election, 2002
Party	Candidate	Votes	%
Republican	Jim Kolbe (incumbent)	126,930	63.3
Democratic	Mary Judge Ryan	67,328	33.6
Libertarian	Joe Duarte	6,142	3.1
Write-In	Jim Dorrance	28	0.0
Majority		59,602	29.7
Total votes		200,428	100.00
Republican hold			
