= 2000 United States House of Representatives elections in Arizona =

- November 7, 2000

All 6 Arizona seats to the United States House of Representatives
	Majority party	Minority party
Party	Republican	Democratic
Last election	5	1
Seats won	5	1
Seat change	Steady	Steady
Popular vote	854,715	557,849
Percentage	58.32%	38.06%
Swing	▲1.17%	▼2.47%

Republican
40–50%
50–60%
60–70%
Democratic
50–60%
60–70%

The 2000 congressional elections in Arizona were elections for Arizona's delegation to the United States House of Representatives, which occurred along with congressional elections nationwide on November 7, 2000. Arizona has six seats, as apportioned during the 1990 United States census. Republicans held five seats and Democrats held one seat.

== Overview ==
=== Statewide ===
Party	Candidates	Votes		Seats		
Party	Candidates	No.	%	No.	+/–	%
Republican	6	854,715	58.32	5	Steady	83.33
Democratic	6	557,849	38.06	1	Steady	16.67
Libertarian	6	41,670	2.84	0	Steady	0.0
Green	1	9,010	0.61	0	Steady	0.0
Natural Law	1	2,412	0.16	0	Steady	0.0
Total	20	1,465,656	100.0	6	Steady	100.0

Popular vote
Republican	58.32%
Democratic	38.06%
Libertarian	2.84%
Green	0.61%
Other	0.16%

House seats
Republican	83.33%
Democratic	16.67%

=== By district ===
Results of the 2000 United States House of Representatives elections in Arizona by district:

District	Republican		Democratic		Others		Total		Result
District	Votes	%	Votes	%	Votes	%	Votes	%	Result
District 1	123,289	53.61%	97,455	42.38%	9,227	4.01%	229,971	100.0%	Republican hold
District 2	32,990	26.91%	84,034	68.54%	5,581	4.55%	122,605	100.0%	Democratic hold
District 3	198,367	65.69%	94,676	31.35%	8,927	2.96%	301,970	100.0%	Republican hold
District 4	140,396	63.96%	71,803	32.71%	7,298	3.32%	219,497	100.0%	Republican hold
District 5	172,986	60.15%	101,564	35.31%	13,059	4.54%	287,609	100.0%	Republican hold
District 6	186,687	61.41%	108,317	35.63%	9,000	2.96%	304,004	100.0%	Republican hold
Total	854,715	58.32%	557,849	38.06%	53,092	3.62%	1,465,656	100.0%	

== District 1 ==
2000 Arizona's 1st congressional district election

Nominee	Jeff Flake	David Mendoza
Party	Republican	Democratic
Popular vote	123,289	97,455
Percentage	53.6%	42.4%
- County results Flake: 50–60%
U.S. Representative before election
Matt Salmon
Republican
Elected U.S. Representative
Jeff Flake
Republican

Incumbent Republican Matt Salmon, who had represented the district since 1995, did not run for re-election, having pledged to serve only three terms in Congress. He was re-elected with 65% of the vote in 1998.

=== Republican primary ===
==== Results ====
Republican primary results
Party	Candidate	Votes	%
Republican	Jeff Flake	16,745	31.8
Republican	Sal Diciccio	12,490	23.7
Republican	Susan Bitter Smith	11,763	22.3
Republican	Tom Liddy	10,898	20.7
Republican	Bert Tollefson	764	1.5
Total votes		52,660	100.0

=== General Election ===
==== Results ====
Arizona's 1st congressional district election, 2000
Party	Candidate	Votes	%
Republican	Jeff Flake	123,289	53.6
Democratic	David Mendoza	97,455	42.4
Libertarian	Jon Burroughs	9,227	4.0
Majority		25,834	11.2
Total votes		229,971	100.0
Republican hold			

== District 2 ==
2000 Arizona's 2nd congressional district election
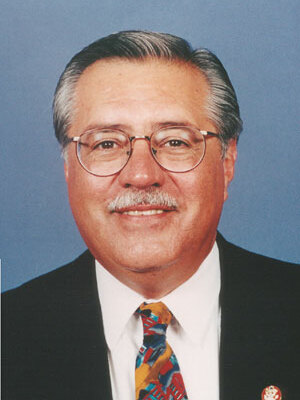

Nominee	Ed Pastor	Bill Barenholtz
Party	Democratic	Republican
Popular vote	84,034	32,990
Percentage	68.5%	26.9%
- County results Pastor: 70–80% 80–90% Barenholtz: 40–50%
U.S. Representative before election
Ed Pastor
Democratic
Elected U.S. Representative
Ed Pastor
Democratic

Incumbent Democrat Ed Pastor, who had represented the district since 1991, ran for re-election. He was re-elected with 67.8% of the vote in 1998.

=== General Election ===
==== Results ====
Arizona's 2nd congressional district election, 2000
Party	Candidate	Votes	%
Democratic	Ed Pastor (incumbent)	84,034	68.5
Republican	Bill Barenholtz	32,990	26.9
Libertarian	Geoffrey Weber	3,169	2.6
Natural Law	Barbara Shelor	2,412	2.0
Majority		51,044	41.6
Total votes		122,605	100.0
Democratic hold			

== District 3 ==
2000 Arizona's 3rd congressional district election
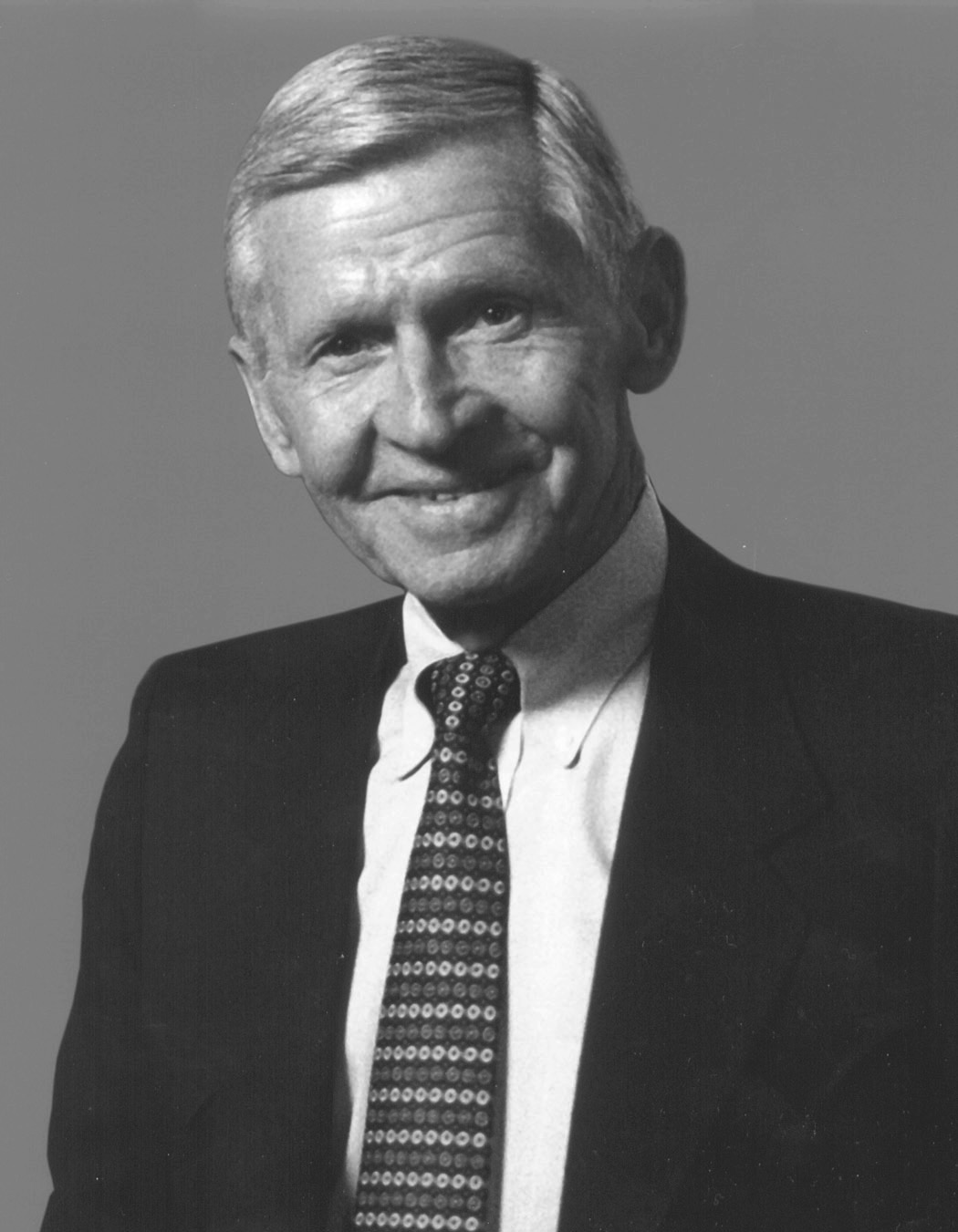

Nominee	Bob Stump	Gene Scharer
Party	Republican	Democratic
Popular vote	198,367	94,676
Percentage	68.5%	31.4%
U.S. Representative before election
Bob Stump
Republican
Elected U.S. Representative
Bob Stump
Republican

Incumbent Republican Bob Stump, who had represented the district since 1977, ran for re-election. He was re-elected with 67.3% of the vote in 1998.

=== General Election ===
==== Results ====
Arizona's 3rd congressional district election, 2000
Party	Candidate	Votes	%
Republican	Bob Stump (incumbent)	198,367	68.5
Democratic	Gene Scharer	94,676	31.4
Libertarian	Edward Carlson	5,581	4.6
Majority		103,691	34.3
Total votes		301,970	100.0
Republican hold			

== District 4 ==
2000 Arizona's 4th congressional district election
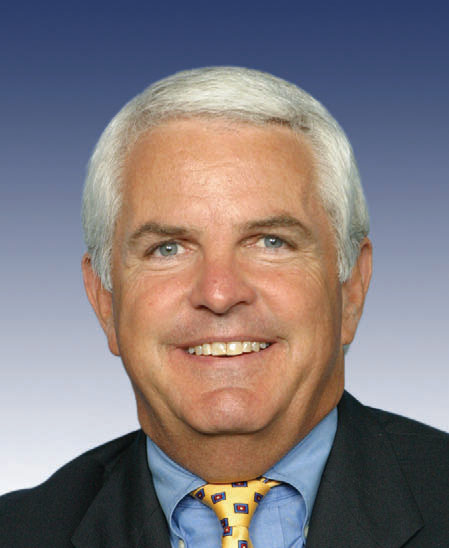

Nominee	John Shadegg	Ben Jankowski
Party	Republican	Democratic
Popular vote	140,396	71,803
Percentage	64.0%	32.7%
- County results Shadegg: 60–70%
U.S. Representative before election
John Shadegg
Republican
Elected U.S. Representative
John Shadegg
Republican

Incumbent Republican John Shadegg, who had represented the district since 1995, ran for re-election. He was re-elected with 64.7% of the vote in 1998.

=== General Election ===
==== Results ====
Arizona's 4th congressional district election, 2000
Party	Candidate	Votes	%
Republican	John Shadegg (incumbent)	140,396	64.0
Democratic	Ben Jankowski	71,803	32.7
Libertarian	Ernest Hancock	7,298	3.3
Majority		68,593	31.3
Total votes		219,497	100.0
Republican hold			

== District 5 ==
2000 Arizona's 5th congressional district election
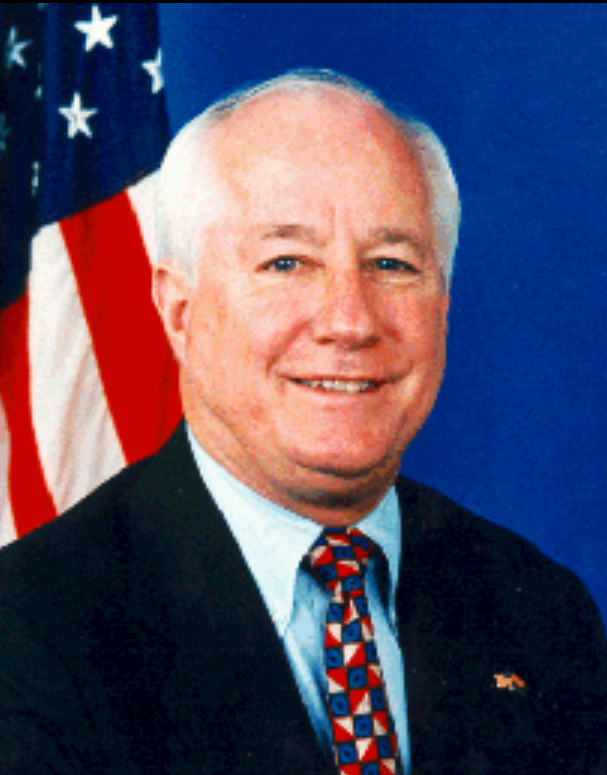

Nominee	Jim Kolbe	George Cunningham
Party	Republican	Democratic
Popular vote	172,986	101,564
Percentage	60.2%	35.3%
- County results Kolbe: 50–60% 60–70%
U.S. Representative before election
Jim Kolbe
Republican
Elected U.S. Representative
Jim Kolbe
Republican

Incumbent Republican Jim Kolbe, who had represented the district since 1985, ran for re-election. He was re-elected with 51.6% of the vote in 1998.

=== General Election ===
==== Results ====
Arizona's 5th congressional district election, 2000
Party	Candidate	Votes	%
Republican	Jim Kolbe (incumbent)	172,986	60.2
Democratic	George Cunningham	101,564	35.3
Green	Michael Jay Green	9,010	3.1
Libertarian	Aage Nost	4,049	1.4
Majority		71,422	24.8
Total votes		287,609	100.0
Republican hold			

== District 6 ==
2000 Arizona's 6th congressional district election
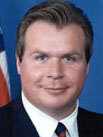

Nominee	J.D. Hayworth	Larry Nelson
Party	Republican	Democratic
Popular vote	186,687	108,317
Percentage	61.4%	35.6%
- County results Nelson: 40–50% 50–60% 60–70% Hayworth: 50–60% 60–70%
U.S. Representative before election
J.D. Hayworth
Republican
Elected U.S. Representative
J.D. Hayworth
Republican

Incumbent Republican J.D. Hayworth, who had represented the district since 1995, ran for re-election. He was re-elected with 53.0% of the vote in 1998.

=== General Election ===
==== Results ====
Arizona's 6th congressional district election, 2000
Party	Candidate	Votes	%
Republican	J.D. Hayworth (incumbent)	186,687	61.4
Democratic	Larry Nelson	108,317	35.6
Libertarian	Richard Duncan	9,000	3.0
Majority		78,370	25.8
Total votes		304,004	100.0
Republican hold			
