= 1998 United States House of Representatives elections in Arizona =

- November 7, 1998

All 6 Arizona seats to the United States House of Representatives
	Majority party	Minority party
Party	Republican	Democratic
Last election	5	1
Seats won	5	1
Seat change	Steady	Steady
Popular vote	573,651	406,834
Percentage	57.15%	40.53%
Swing	▼1.90%	▲2.10%

Republican
40–50%
50–60%
60–70%
Democratic
40–50%
50–60%
60–70%
70–80%

The 1998 congressional elections in Arizona were elections for Arizona's delegation to the United States House of Representatives, which occurred along with congressional elections nationwide on November 7, 1998. Arizona has six seats, as apportioned during the 1990 United States census. Republicans held five seats and Democrats held one seat.

== Overview ==
1998 United States House of Representatives elections in Arizona
Party	Votes	Percentage	Seats	+/–
Republican	573,651	57.15%	5	-
Democratic	406,834	40.53%	1	-
Libertarian	18,042	1.80%	0	-
Others	5,239	0.52%	0	-
Totals	1,003,766	100.00%	6	-
