= 1996 United States House of Representatives elections in Arizona =

- November 5, 1996

All 6 Arizona seats to the United States House of Representatives
	Majority party	Minority party
Party	Republican	Democratic
Last election	5	1
Seats won	5	1
Seat change	Steady	Steady
Popular vote	800,917	521,345
Percentage	59.05%	38.43%
Swing	▼0.33%	▲1.17%

Republican
40–50%
50–60%
60–70%
Democratic
40–50%
50–60%
60–70%
70–80%

The 1996 congressional elections in Arizona were elections for Arizona's delegation to the United States House of Representatives, which occurred concurrently with congressional elections nationwide on November 5, 1996. Arizona has six seats, as apportioned during the 1990 United States census. Republicans held five seats and Democrats held one seat.

== Overview ==
1996 United States House of Representatives elections in Arizona
Party	Votes	Percentage	Seats	+/–
Republican	800,917	59.05%	5	-
Democratic	521,345	38.43%	1	-
Libertarian	27,554	2.03%	0	-
Others	6,630	0.49%	0	-
Totals	1,356,446	100.00%	6	-
