= Access Tucson =

A public access cable TV production studio in Tucson, Arizona

Access Tucson was a public access station located in Tucson, Arizona operated by The Tucson Community Cable Corporation. The station was started in 1984 by founder and president Sam Behrend. The station was originally located at 124 E. Broadway and focused on a variety shows from local matters, politics and religious issues. Its funding came from a combination of public, educational and government access television (PEG) support from the local cable television provider, fees for classes and membership, donations and fundraising efforts.

In 1991, the channel aired the controversial program The Great Satan At Large from the late Lou Perfidio (1963–2006), whose program contained, among other sights, chroma-keyed videos of Adolf Hitler, under-age strippers, and jesters who publicly masturbated. Perfidio and the show's producer were suspended for 90 days following hearings from the Pima County and City Attorney offices that the program was "obscene". The program never returned to the air again. Lou Perfidio died of MRSA, pneumonia and high blood pressure in 2006.

The "Ari Louis Show", hosted by Jewish TV host Ari Louis, came on the air in 2002. Louis received a variety of antisemitic slurs and other crank calls. Louis's show started receiving regular character calls such as the Wolfman (an imitation of Wolfman Jack), Elmo (who was an imitation of Elmo from Sesame Street), and Kody, a regular into all Access Tucson shows who insisted Louis's show was the best.

Many local documentaries, features and art programs were produced by the company and independent member producers over the years. Programs including a soap opera called "Sunset Years", "Harrigan Afterhours", and "Local Matters", a local news magazine that specialized in promoting City activities and not-for-profit awareness. Another show, "Karaoke Nights" highlighted karaoke singers in the Tucson nightlife scene. In 2011 they were voted Best in Tucson "Best local TV Station that needs your support." They received many W.A.V.E. awards over 30 years of cablecasting and the station was considered one of the best Community Media stations in the Country in the early 2000s. Other popular shows included "Astrology with Tony", and "EcoTimes Update".

The State of Arizona Legislature after much lobbying from the Cable Companies changed the structure of PEG Fees. This opened the door for the redirection of Money collected by those fees into the City of Tucson General Fund. This caused a dramatic reduction and eventual elimination of funding to Community Media from Cable franchise fees.

At the end of May 2015, executive director Lisa Horner announced that Access Tucson would shut down due to a lack of funds. The station would air pre-taped programs through June or until its money runs out, and then it would go off the air. Horner asked public access supporters to attend a city budget hearing on June 9 and wear purple. The city entirely cut funding for Channel 20, known as Access Tucson, or for Channel 12, known as the City Channel, in the 2015 budget. In its place, the city issued a request for proposals (RFP) for a Community Media Center, which would bring both channels under one management contract. Access Tucson missed a June 23 deadline for city money for this new community center by 15 minutes; their packet was not accepted.

Tucson Community Cable Corporation is, "currently in development of a new media presentation dedicated to the ideals of community media," and operates as a media production company in partnership with Southern Arizona not-for-profits including; Tucson Rodeo Parade, Iskashitaa, Nourish and others. The organization is currently in development of two programs designed for local broadcast television. They are also building a library with many hours of programming from the old channel.

Another aspect of their restructuring is the construction of a Community Driven Business Directory: Tucson.org where locals can show support for their favorite businesses, charities, and recreational destinations. New Programming is accepted for the on-demand web platform accesstucson.org.

Since July 2015, the channel space has been occupied by Brink Media (a for profit company) operating as Creative Tucson, which operates under the RFP. Creative Tucson's schedule mostly consists of public domain films and television shows along with trailers for films such as The Blue Max and Invasion of Astro-Monster; there are also some independent films on the station.
