= Arizona's congressional districts =

Map of Arizona's congressional districts since 2023 (Interactive map version)

Arizona is divided into nine congressional districts, each represented by a member of the United States House of Representatives. Since the 2008 elections, Democrats and Republicans have alternated holding a majority of seats in the delegation in six of the last eight elections.

== List of districts and representatives ==
This is a list of United States representatives from Arizona, district boundaries, and the district political ratings according to the CPVI. The delegation has a total of nine members, with six Republicans and three Democrats.

Current U.S. representatives from Arizona
District	Member (Residence)	Party	Incumbent since	CPVI (2025)	District map
1st	David Schweikert (Fountain Hills)	Republican	January 3, 2011	R+1	Map of Arizona's 1st congressional district
2nd	Eli Crane (Oro Valley)	Republican	January 3, 2023	R+7	Map of Arizona's 2nd congressional district
3rd	Yassamin Ansari (Phoenix)	Democratic	January 3, 2025	D+22	Map of Arizona's 3rd congressional district
4th	Greg Stanton (Phoenix)	Democratic	January 3, 2019	D+4	Map of Arizona's 4th congressional district
5th	Andy Biggs (Gilbert)	Republican	January 3, 2017	R+10	Map of Arizona's 5th congressional district
6th	Juan Ciscomani (Tucson)	Republican	January 3, 2023	EVEN	Map of Arizona's 6th congressional district
7th	Adelita Grijalva (Tucson)	Democratic	September 23, 2025	D+13	Map of Arizona's 7th congressional district
8th	Abraham Hamadeh (Phoenix)	Republican	January 3, 2025	R+8	Map of Arizona's 8th congressional district
9th	Paul Gosar (Bullhead City)	Republican	January 3, 2011	R+15	Map of Arizona's 9th congressional district

== History ==
From 1863 to 1912, Arizona Territory sent one non-voting delegate to the House of Representatives. After its statehood in 1912, Arizona was granted one representative in the House. As the state's population has grown, Arizona's delegation has increased in size to its total of nine representatives.

Congress	Representatives	Notes
38th–62nd (1863–1912)	1	Non-voting delegate
62nd–77th (1912–1943)	1	
78th–80th (1943–1949)	2	Elected on an at-large basis
81st–87th (1949–1963)	2	
88th–92nd (1963–1973)	3	
93rd–97th (1973–1983)	4	
98th–102nd (1983–1993)	5	
103rd–107th (1993–2003)	6	
108th–112th (2003–2013)	8	
113th– (2013–)	9	

== Historical and present district boundaries ==
Table of United States congressional district boundary maps in the State of Arizona, presented chronologically. All redistricting events that took place in Arizona between 1973 and 2013 are shown.

Year	Statewide map	Phoenix highlight
1973–1983		
1983–1993		
1993–2003		
2003–2013		
2013–2023		

== Obsolete districts ==
- Arizona Territory's at-large congressional district
- Arizona's at-large congressional district

== Notes ==
Due to redistricting, the congressional district numbers in Arizona have changed for the 2022 election cycle. Through this process, the district numbers have changed the following ways:

- Arizona's 1st congressional district became Arizona's 2nd congressional district
- Arizona's 2nd congressional district became Arizona's 6th congressional district
- Arizona's 3rd congressional district became Arizona's 7th congressional district
- Arizona's 4th congressional district became Arizona's 9th congressional district
- Arizona's 5th congressional district remained Arizona's 5th congressional district
- Arizona's 6th congressional district became Arizona's 1st congressional district
- Arizona's 7th congressional district became Arizona's 3rd congressional district
- Arizona's 8th congressional district remained Arizona's 8th congressional district
- Arizona's 9th congressional district became Arizona's 4th congressional district

== See also ==
- Arizona's congressional delegations
- List of United States congressional districts
