= 2008 United States House of Representatives elections in Arizona =

- November 4, 2008

All 8 Arizona seats to the United States House of Representatives
- Turnout: 77.69%
	Majority party	Minority party
Party	Democratic	Republican
Last election	4	4
Seats won	5	3
Seat change	▲1	▼1
Popular vote	1,055,305	1,021,798
Percentage	45.5%	44.0%
Swing	▲3.46%	▼7.62%

Democratic
40–50%
50–60%
60–70%
70–80%
Republican
40–50%
50–60%
60–70%

The 2008 congressional elections in Arizona were held on November 4, 2008, to determine who would represent the state of Arizona in the United States House of Representatives, coinciding with the presidential election. Representatives were elected for two-year terms; those elected served in the 111th Congress from January 4, 2009 until January 3, 2011.

Arizona had eight seats in the House, apportioned according to the 2000 United States census. Its 2007-2008 congressional delegation consisted of four Republicans and four Democrats. Two of the Democrats had taken Republican seats in 2006, and were at risk during the 2008 election. The delegation elected in 2008 consisted of three Republicans and five Democrats: district 1 changed party (from open Republican to Democratic), although CQ Politics had forecast districts 1, 3, 5 and 8 to be at some risk for the incumbent party.

The party primary elections were held on September 2, 2008.

== Overview ==
=== Statewide ===
Party	Candidates	Votes		Seats		
Party	Candidates	No.	%	No.	+/–	%
Democratic	8	1,055,305	45.47	5	▲1	62.50
Republican	8	1,021,798	44.03	3	▼1	37.50
Libertarian	8	61,100	2.63	0	Steady	0.0
Independent	4	9,411	0.41	0	Steady	0.0
Green	2	8,080	0.35	0	Steady	0.0
Valid votes		2,155,694	92.88	—		
Invalid or blank votes		165,157	7.12	—		
Total	30	2,320,851	100.0	8	Steady	100.0

Popular vote
Democratic	45.47%
Republican	44.03%
Libertarian	2.63%
Green	0.35%
Other	0.41%

House seats
Democratic	62.50%
Republican	37.50%

=== By district ===
Results of the 2008 United States House of Representatives elections in Arizona by district:

District	Democratic		Republican		Others		Total		Result
District	Votes	%	Votes	%	Votes	%	Votes	%	Result
District 1	155,791	55.88%	109,924	39.43%	13,072	4.69%	278,787	100.0%	Democratic gain
District 2	125,611	37.16%	200,914	59.44%	11,498	3.40%	338,023	100.0%	Republican hold
District 3	115,759	42.07%	148,800	54.08%	10,602	3.85%	275,161	100.0%	Republican hold
District 4	89,721	72.11%	26,435	21.25%	8,271	6.65%	124,427	100.0%	Democratic hold
District 5	149,033	53.16%	122,165	43.57%	9,167	3.27%	280,365	100.0%	Democratic hold
District 6	115,457	34.55%	208,582	62.42%	10,137	3.03%	334,176	100.0%	Republican hold
District 7	124,304	63.26%	64,425	32.79%	7,760	3.95%	196,489	100.0%	Democratic hold
District 8	179,629	54.72%	140,553	42.82%	8,084	2.46%	328,266	100.0%	Democratic hold
Total	1,055,305	45.47%	1,021,798	44.03%	78,591	10.50%	2,155,694	100.0%	

== District 1 ==
2008 Arizona's 1st congressional district election
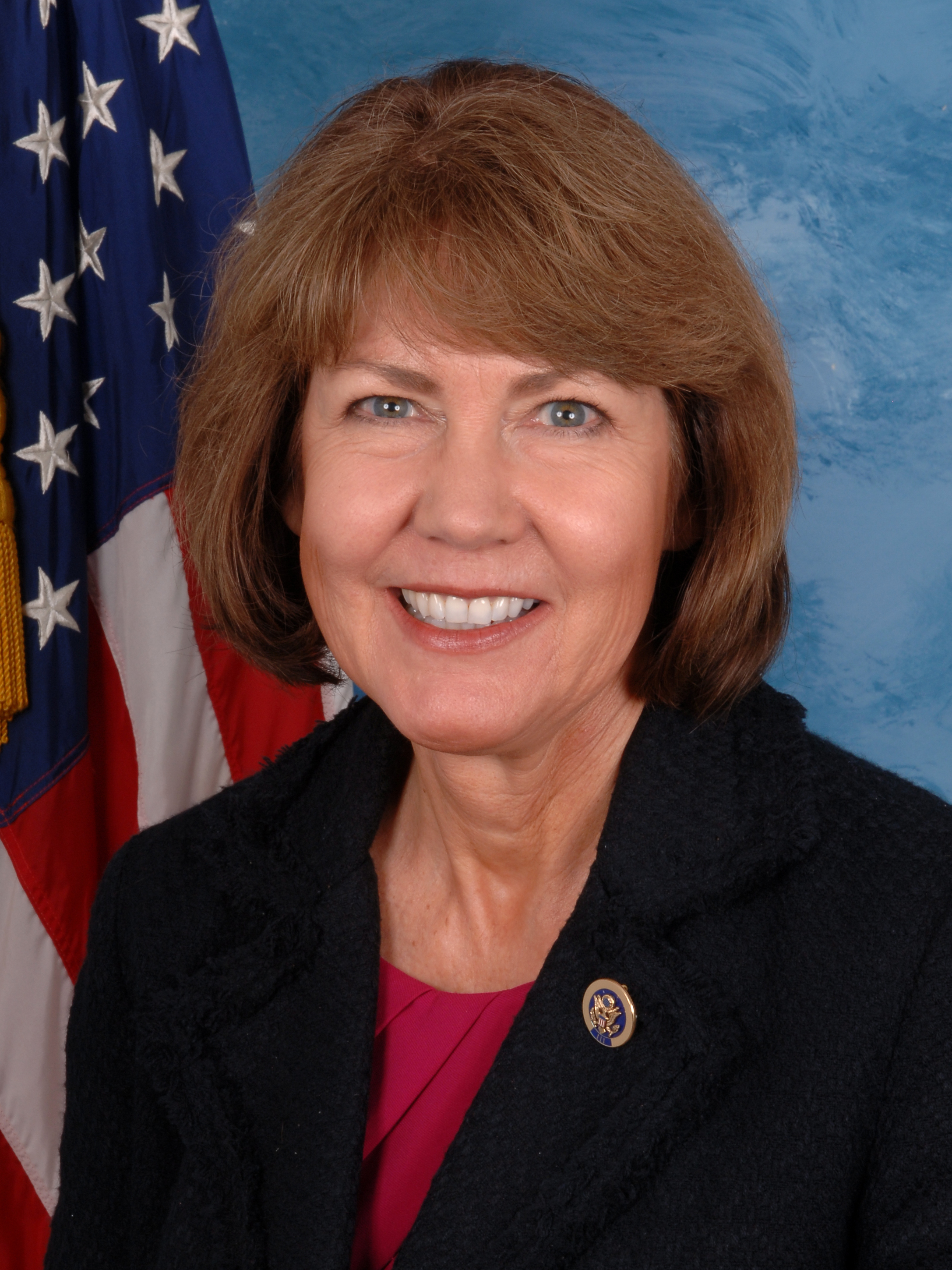

Nominee	Ann Kirkpatrick	Sydney Hay
Party	Democratic	Republican
Popular vote	155,791	109,924
Percentage	55.9%	39.4%
- County results Kirkpatrick: 50–60% 60–70% 70–80% Hay: 40–50% 50–60%
U.S. Representative before election
Rick Renzi
Republican
Elected U.S. Representative
Ann Kirkpatrick
Democratic

Incumbent Republican Rick Renzi, who had represented the district since 2003, did not run for re-election. He was re-elected with only 52% of the vote compared to 44% for his Democratic opponent–Sedona civil rights attorney Ellen Simon–in 2006; George W. Bush won 54% of the vote in this northern Arizona district in 2004. The district had a PVI of R+2.

=== Republican primary ===
In August 2007, Renzi announced he would not seek re-election, four months after the FBI raided Renzi's family business as part of a federal investigation.

==== Candidates ====
In the Republican primary, Sydney Ann Hay, mining industry lobbyist, earned a narrower-than-expected victory against Sandra L. B. Livingstone, Tom Hansen and Barry Hall.

===== Nominee =====
- Sydney Hay, mining industry lobbyist and candidate for the seat in 2002

===== Eliminated in primary =====
- Barry Hall, former Baptist minister
- Sandra Livingstone, former State Department official and lawyer
- Tom Hansen, engineer

===== Withdrawn =====
- Preston Korn, candidate for state representative in 2006

===== Declined =====
- Ken Bennett, former president of the Arizona Senate
- Bill Konopnicki, state representative
- Steve Pierce, rancher
- Kris Mayes, member of the Arizona Corporation Commission
- Tom O'Halleran, state senate
- Rick Renzi, incumbent U.S. Representative
- Lewis Tenney, former Navajo County Supervisor and candidate for the seat in 2002

==== Results ====
Republican primary results
Party	Candidate	Votes	%
Republican	Sydney Ann Hay	17,825	39.1
Republican	Sandra Livingstone	15,621	34.2
Republican	Tom Hansen	7,847	17.2
Republican	Barry Hall	2,743	6.0
Republican	Preston Korn (Withdrew)	1,596	3.5
Total votes		45,632	100.0

=== Democratic primary ===
==== Candidates ====
===== Nominee =====
- Ann Kirkpatrick, former state representative and prosecutor

===== Eliminated in primary =====
- Jeffrey Brown, mental health advocate
- Mary Kim Titla, publisher and former Phoenix TV newscaster
- Howard Shanker, attorney

===== Withdrawn =====
- Allan Affeldt, mayor of Winslow
- Ellen Simon, civil rights attorney and nominee for the seat in 2006 (dropped out in May 2007, citing personal reasons)

===== Declined =====
- George Cordova, businessman and nominee for the seat in 2002
- Jim Ledbetter, attorney
- Bob Mitchell, former mayor of Casa Grande (brother of Democratic Congressman Harry Mitchell)
- Jim Pederson, real estate developer, former chair of the Arizona Democratic Party and nominee for U.S. Senate in 2006
- Carter Olson, Pinal County attorney
- Steve Owens, Arizona Department of Environmental Quality director and nominee for the 6th district in 1996 & 1998

==== Endorsements ====
Kirkpatrick earned endorsements from leaders in government, education, tribal communities, first responders, and other groups. Among those endorsing her were: Governor Janet Napolitano, U.S. Representative Gabby Giffords, U.S. Representative Harry Mitchell, the Arizona Education Association, the Arizona Police Association, the Arizona Conference of Police and Sheriffs, the International Association of Fire Fighters, Navajo County School Superintendent Linda Morrow, county sheriffs in Coconino, Gila, Graham, Greenlee, Navajo, and Pinal Counties, Coconino County School Superintendent Cecilia Owen, Pinal County School Superintendent Orlenda Roberts, Navajo Nation President Joe Shirley Jr., San Carlos Apache Tribal Chair Wendsler Nosie, White Mountain Apache Tribal Chair Ronnie Lupe, former Navajo Nation President Dr. Peterson Zah, and many other tribal leaders. The Arizona Republic, the state's largest newspaper, the White Mountain Independent, and the Arizona Daily Sun (two of the most widely read newspapers in the district), also endorsed her candidacy.

==== Results ====
Kirkpatrick won by almost 15 points over Kim Titla.

Democratic primary results
Party	Candidate	Votes	%
Democratic	Ann Kirkpatrick	26,734	47.2
Democratic	Mary Kim Titla	18,428	32.6
Democratic	Howard Shanker	8,056	14.2
Democratic	Jeffrey Brown	3,376	6.0
Total votes		56,594	100.0

=== Libertarian primary ===
==== Results ====
Libertarian primary results
Party	Candidate	Votes	%
Libertarian	Thane Eichenauer (write-in)	43	100.0
Total votes		43	100.0

=== Independents ===
Independent Brent Maupin, a Sedona engineer and businessman ran.

=== General election ===
==== Campaign ====
Kirkpatrick ran on a platform of tax cuts for 86 million middle-class families, making health care affordable and accessible to all, and encouraging renewable energy projects to end America's dependence on foreign energy and create jobs for rural Arizona. She also supported increasing teacher salaries, expanding SCHIP, and adding a division to the army. As a member of the Arizona State Legislature, Kirkpatrick was known for her willingness to work across party lines.

Hay meanwhile ran on increasing offshore drilling and in the Arctic National Wildlife Refuge as well as tapping oil reserves in Colorado and Wyoming to stimulate the economy. She also recognized the need to reach across party lines to create meaningful change.

==== Predictions ====
Source	Ranking	As of
The Cook Political Report	Likely D (flip)	November 6, 2008
Rothenberg	Likely D (flip)	November 2, 2008
Sabato's Crystal Ball	Lean D (flip)	November 6, 2008
Real Clear Politics	Lean D (flip)	November 7, 2008
CQ Politics	Lean D (flip)	November 6, 2008

==== Results ====
Kirkpatrick's victory resulted in a House gain for Democrats.

Arizona's 1st congressional district election, 2008
Party	Candidate	Votes	%
Democratic	Ann Kirkpatrick	155,791	55.9
Republican	Sydney Hay	109,924	39.4
Independent	Brent Maupin	9,394	3.4
Libertarian	Thane Eichenauer	3,678	1.3
Total votes		278,787	100.0
Democratic gain from Republican			

- Race ranking and details from CQ Politics
- Campaign contributions from OpenSecrets

== District 2 ==
2008 Arizona's 2nd congressional district election
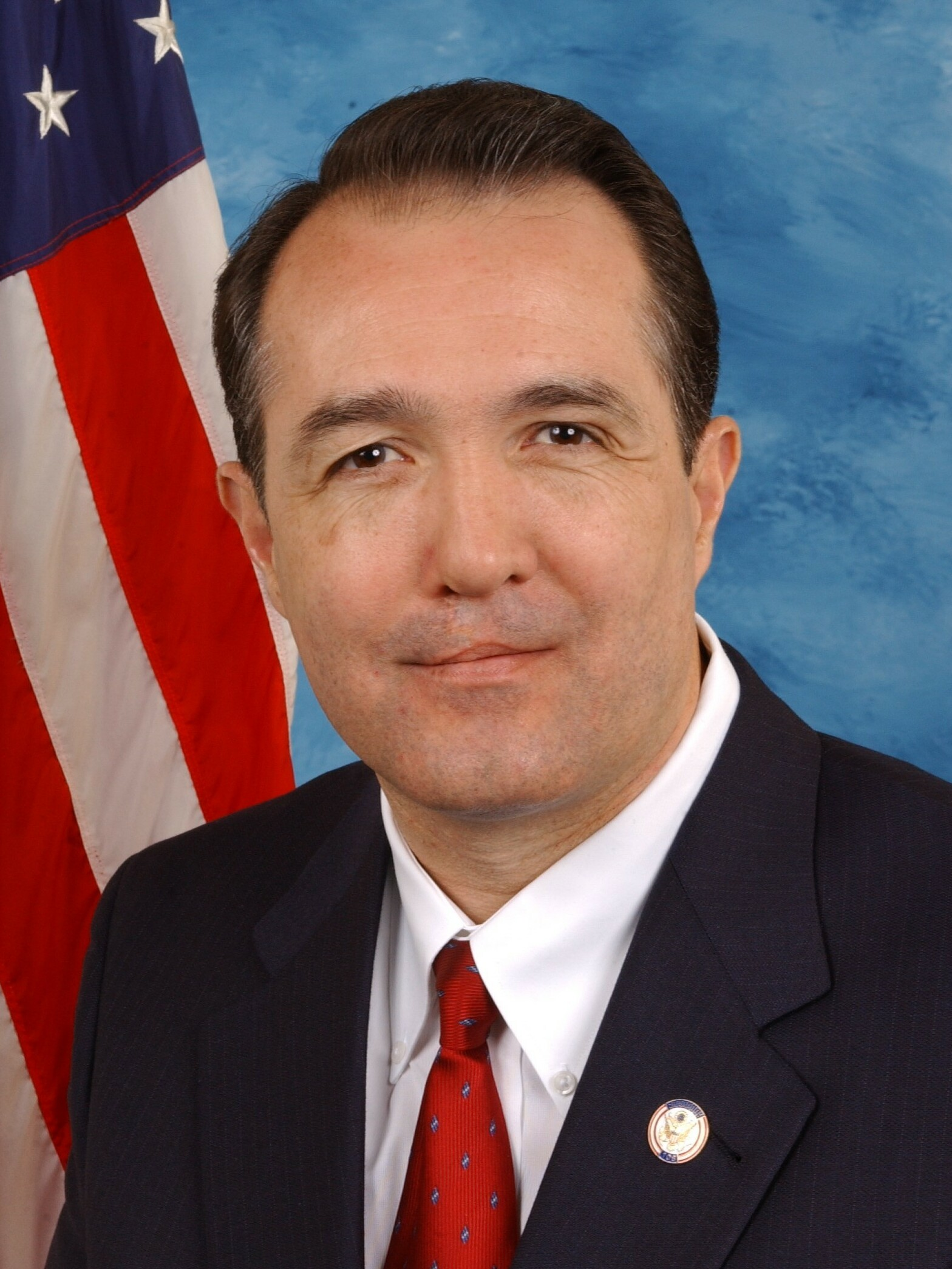

Nominee	Trent Franks	John Thrasher
Party	Republican	Democratic
Popular vote	200,914	125,611
Percentage	59.4%	37.2%
- County results Franks: 50–60% 60–70% Thrasher: 60–70% 70–80%
U.S. Representative before election
Trent Franks
Republican
Elected U.S. Representative
Trent Franks
Republican

Incumbent Republican Trent Franks, who had represented the district since 2003, ran for re-election. He was re-elected with 58.6% of the vote in 2006. The district had a PVI of R+9.

=== Republican primary ===
==== Candidates ====
===== Nominee =====
- Trent Franks, incumbent U.S. Representative

==== Results ====
Republican primary results
Party	Candidate	Votes	%
Republican	Trent Franks (incumbent)	58,707	100.0
Total votes		58,707	100.0

=== Democratic primary ===
In what was essentially a rematch of the previous election, Franks was challenged by Democrat John Thrasher (campaign website)

==== Candidates ====
===== Nominee =====
- John Thrasher, educator and nominee for the seat in 2006

==== Results ====
Democratic primary results
Party	Candidate	Votes	%
Democratic	John Thrasher	27,711	100.0
Total votes		27,711	100.0

=== Libertarian primary ===
==== Candidates ====
===== Nominee =====
- Powell Gammill, molecular biologist and nominee for the seat in 2004 and 2006

==== Results ====
Libertarian primary results
Party	Candidate	Votes	%
Libertarian	Powell Gammill	199	100.0
Total votes		199	100.0

=== Green primary ===
==== Candidates ====
===== Nominee =====
- William Crum

==== Results ====
Green primary results
Party	Candidate	Votes	%
Green	William Crum	118	100.0
Total votes		118	100.0

=== General election ===
==== Predictions ====
Source	Ranking	As of
The Cook Political Report	Safe R	November 6, 2008
Rothenberg	Safe R	November 2, 2008
Sabato's Crystal Ball	Safe R	November 6, 2008
Real Clear Politics	Safe R	November 7, 2008
CQ Politics	Safe R	November 6, 2008

==== Results ====
Arizona's 2nd congressional district election, 2008
Party	Candidate	Votes	%
Republican	Trent Franks (incumbent)	200,914	59.4
Democratic	John Thrasher	125,611	37.2
Libertarian	Powell Gammill	7,882	2.3
Green	William Crum	3,616	1.1
Total votes		338,023	100.0
Republican hold			

- Race ranking and details from CQ Politics
- Campaign contributions from OpenSecrets

== District 3 ==
2008 Arizona's 3rd congressional district election
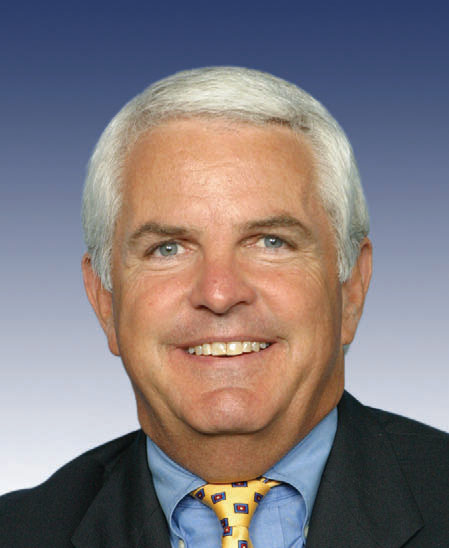

Nominee	John Shadegg	Bob Lord
Party	Republican	Democratic
Popular vote	148,800	115,759
Percentage	54.1%	42.1%
- Shadegg: 40–50% 50–60% 60–70% 70–80% Lord: 40–50% 50–60% 60–70% Tie: 40–50%
U.S. Representative before election
John Shadegg
Republican
Elected U.S. Representative
John Shadegg
Republican

Incumbent Republican John Shadegg, who had represented the district since 1995, ran for re-election. He was re-elected with 59.3% of the vote in 2006. The district was previously represented by Arizona's junior United States senator, Republican Jon Kyl. The district had a PVI of R+6.

=== Republican primary ===
An outspoken conservative, Shadegg has consistently been re-elected in the Republican-leaning district (Cook Partisan Voting Index of R+6) in the northern Phoenix suburbs which gave George W. Bush 57.9 percent of the vote in 2004. However, Lord outraised Shadegg in the first quarter of 2007 and even had more cash on hand compared to Shadegg, which resulted in an unusually competitive race. However, Shadegg's campaign team noted that Shadegg's funds are smaller than expected due to Shadegg donating most of the money in 2006 to fellow Republicans in a last-ditch, albeit lackluster attempt to retain control of Congress.

On February 11, 2008, incumbent Shadegg announced he would not run for an eighth term, saying that he wanted to "seek a new challenge in a different venue to advance the cause of freedom." However, on February 21, Shadegg retracted the statement and announced he would seek re-election. Over 140 Republicans in Congress had signed a letter asking Shadegg to keep his seat. Although it was speculated that he would run for the United States Senate if John McCain were to become president, Shadegg had expressed his intention to leave public life and return to the private sector before changing his mind.

Steve May a former state representative had announced a run for the seat but withdrew from the race when Shadegg announced he would seek another term after all.

==== Candidates ====
===== Nominee =====
- John Shadegg, incumbent U.S. Representative

===== Withdrawn =====
- Steve May, former state representative

===== Declined =====
- Pamela Gorman, state senator
- Dean Martin, state treasurer
- Sean Noble, Shadegg's chief of staff
- Jim Waring, state senator
- James Weiers, speaker of the Arizona House of Representatives
- Ed Winkler, mayor of Paradise Valley

==== Results ====
Republican primary results
Party	Candidate	Votes	%
Republican	John Shadegg (incumbent)	43,538	100.0
Total votes		43,538	100.0

=== Democratic primary ===
==== Candidates ====
===== Nominee =====
- Bob Lord, tax attorney (campaign website)

==== Results ====
Democratic primary results
Party	Candidate	Votes	%
Democratic	Bob Lord	22,554	100.0
Total votes		22,554	100.0

=== Libertarian primary ===
==== Candidates ====
===== Nominee =====
- Michael Shoen

==== Results ====
Libertarian primary results
Party	Candidate	Votes	%
Libertarian	Michael Shoen	228	100.0
Total votes		228	100.0

=== Independents ===
Running as independents were Mark Yannone (campaign website), Annie Loyd, and Edwin Winkler.

Annie Loyd, running on a platform of "transpartisan politics", has been said by The Arizona Republic to be a moderate. Born in South Dakota and a community activist in Los Angeles, she is a 15-year resident of Phoenix. She made an appearance at Columbia University. Shadegg's 2006 Democratic opponent, consultant Herb Paine, announced his support for Loyd. However, none of the independents made the ballot.

=== General election ===
==== Campaign ====
The race was covered by the East Valley Tribune. It showed a 27% independent voter population and noted increased registration of independents in District 3. In a district of 600,000 people cutting across urban Phoenix into rural parts of northern Maricopa County. The Federal Elections Commission reports that as of December 31, 2007, Shadegg had raised over $1,000,000, Lord over $600,000, and Loyd $26,000. May and Winkler had not reported any fundraising.

==== Polling ====
Poll source	Date(s) administered	Sample size	Margin of error	John Shadegg (R)	Bob Lord (D)	Michael Shoen (L)	Undecided
Research 2000 (Daily Kos)	October 20–22, 2008	400 (LV)	±5.0%	50%	40%	2%	8%
Research 2000 (Daily Kos)	October 6–8, 2008	400 (LV)	±5.0%	48%	39%	2%	11%
Anzalone Liszt Research (D-DCCC)	October 6–8, 2008	400 (LV)	±4.9%	44%	45%	5%	6%

==== Predictions ====
Source	Ranking	As of
The Cook Political Report	Lean R	November 6, 2008
Rothenberg	Likely R	November 2, 2008
Sabato's Crystal Ball	Lean R	November 6, 2008
Real Clear Politics	Lean R	November 7, 2008
CQ Politics	Lean R	November 6, 2008

==== Results ====
Despite running a campaign privately criticized by Republican operatives, Shadegg was re-elected by 12 points in a strong Democratic year.

Arizona's 3rd congressional district election, 2008
Party	Candidate	Votes	%
Republican	John Shadegg (incumbent)	148,800	54.1
Democratic	Bob Lord	115,759	42.1
Libertarian	Michael Shoen	10,602	3.9
Total votes		275,161	100.0
Republican hold			

- Race ranking and details from CQ Politics
- Campaign contributions from OpenSecrets

== District 4 ==
2008 Arizona's 4th congressional district election
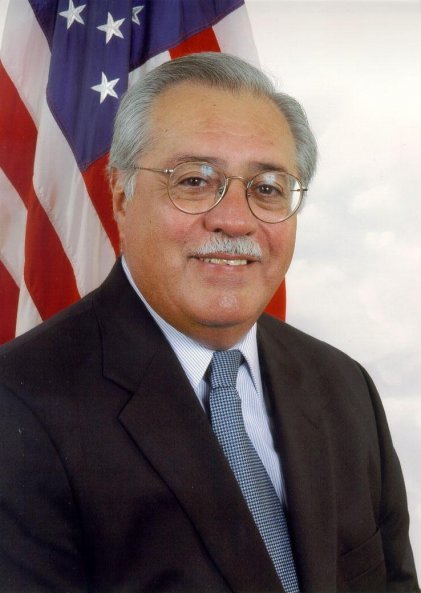

Nominee	Ed Pastor	Don Karg
Party	Democratic	Republican
Popular vote	89,721	26,435
Percentage	72.1%	21.3%
- County results Pastor: 70–80%
U.S. Representative before election
Ed Pastor
Democratic
Elected U.S. Representative
Ed Pastor
Democratic

Incumbent Democrat Ed Pastor, who had represented the district since 1991, ran for re-election. He was re-elected with 72.5% of the vote in 2006. The district had a PVI of D+14.

=== Democratic primary ===
==== Candidates ====
===== Nominee =====
- Ed Pastor, incumbent U.S. Representative

==== Results ====
Democratic primary results
Party	Candidate	Votes	%
Democratic	Ed Pastor (incumbent)	18,660	100.0
Total votes		18,660	100.0

=== Republican primary ===
==== Candidates ====
===== Nominee =====
- Don Karg

==== Results ====
Republican primary results
Party	Candidate	Votes	%
Republican	Don Karg	8,073	99.9
Republican	Richard Grayson (write-in)	8	0.1
Total votes		8,081	100.0

=== Libertarian primary ===
==== Candidates ====
===== Nominee =====
- Joe Cobb, retired economist and nominee for the 7th District in 2006

==== Results ====
Libertarian primary results
Party	Candidate	Votes	%
Libertarian	Joe Cobb	156	100.0
Total votes		156	100.0

=== Green primary ===
==== Candidates ====
===== Nominee =====
- Rebecca DeWitt, accountant

==== Results ====
Green primary results
Party	Candidate	Votes	%
Green	Rebecca DeWitt	71	100.0
Total votes		71	100.0

=== General election ===
==== Predictions ====
Source	Ranking	As of
The Cook Political Report	Safe D	November 6, 2008
Rothenberg	Safe D	November 2, 2008
Sabato's Crystal Ball	Safe D	November 6, 2008
Real Clear Politics	Safe D	November 7, 2008
CQ Politics	Safe D	November 6, 2008

==== Results ====
Arizona's 4th congressional district election, 2008
Party	Candidate	Votes	%
Democratic	Ed Pastor (incumbent)	89,721	72.1
Republican	Don Karg	26,435	21.3
Green	Rebecca DeWitt	4,464	3.6
Libertarian	Joe Cobb	3,807	3.1
Total votes		124,427	100.00
Democratic hold			

- Race ranking and details from CQ Politics
- Campaign contributions from OpenSecrets

== District 5 ==
2008 Arizona's 5th congressional district election
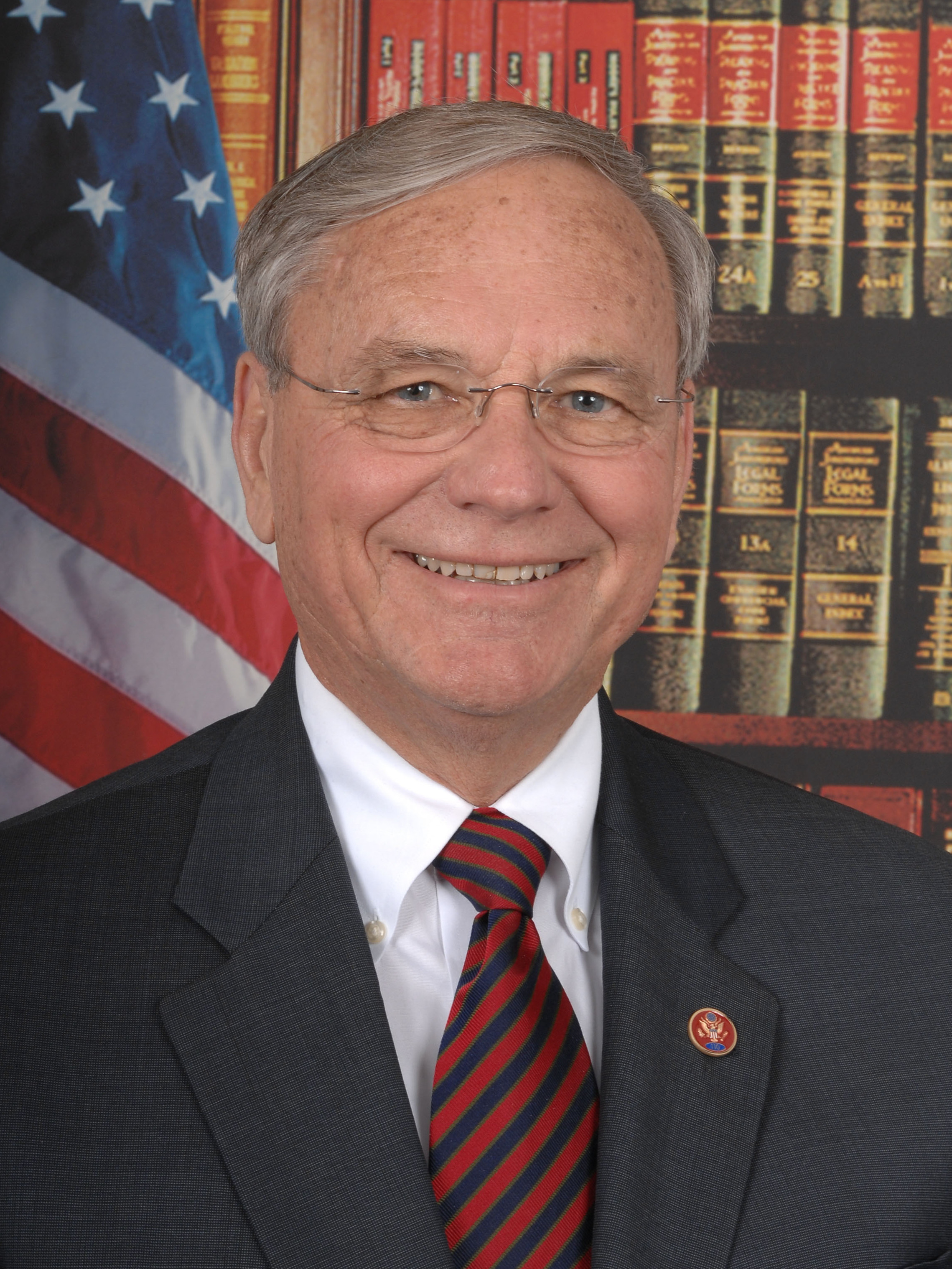

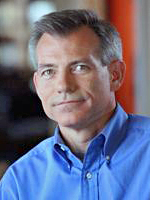
Nominee	Harry Mitchell	David Schweikert
Party	Democratic	Republican
Popular vote	149,033	122,165
Percentage	53.2%	43.6%
- Schweikert: 40–50% 50–60% 60–70% 70–80% Mitchell: 40–50% 50–60% 60–70% 70–80% 80–90% Tie: 50%
U.S. Representative before election
Harry Mitchell
Democratic
Elected U.S. Representative
Harry Mitchell
Democratic

The district has been represented by Democrat Harry Mitchell since 2007. He unseated conservative Republican J.D. Hayworth by 50% to 47% in the Republican-leaning district in the northeastern Phoenix suburbs which gave George W. Bush 54% of the vote in 2004. The largely Republican nature of this district made a tough 2008 race certain, though Mitchell, who has a government complex in Tempe named after him, had won a lot of tough elections in the past. The district had a PVI of R+4.

=== Democratic primary ===
==== Candidates ====
===== Nominee =====
- Harry Mitchell, incumbent U.S. Representative

==== Results ====
Democratic primary results
Party	Candidate	Votes	%
Democratic	Harry Mitchell (incumbent)	25,174	100.0
Total votes		25,174	100.0

=== Republican primary ===
==== Candidates ====
===== Nominee =====
- David Schweikert, former Maricopa County Treasurer, former state representative and candidate for the seat in 1994

===== Eliminated in primary =====
- Mark Anderson, former state representative
- Susan Bitter Smith, executive director of the Arizona-New Mexico Cable Communications Association and candidate for the 1st District in 1994 and 2000
- Lee Gentry, business owner, attorney and certified public accountant
- Laura Knaperek, former state representative
- Jim Ogsbury, lobbyist and former congressional aide

===== Declined =====
- Hugh Hallman, mayor of Tempe
- Jeff Hatch-Miller, member of the Arizona Corporation Commission and former state representative
- Tom Liddy, lawyer, son of G. Gordon Liddy and candidate for the 1st District in 2000
- Sean Noble, chief of staff to Rep. John Shadegg
- Michele Reagan, state representative
- Matt Salmon, former U.S. Representative and nominee for governor in 2002

==== Results ====
2008 AZ-05 Republican Primary by Precinct: Schweikert: 20–30%; 30–40%; 40–50%; 50–60%; 60–70%; Bitter Smith: 20–30%; 30–40%; 40–50%; Knaperek: 20–30%; 30–40%; 40–50%; 50–60%; Anderson: 20–30%; 30–40%; 40–50%; 50–60%; 60–70%; Ogsbury: 20–30%; 30–40%; Tie: 20–30%; 30–40%; 50%

Republican primary results
Party	Candidate	Votes	%
Republican	David Schweikert	14,233	29.5
Republican	Susan Bitter Smith	13,212	27.4
Republican	Laura Knaperek	7,523	15.6
Republican	Mark Anderson	6,539	13.6
Republican	Jim Ogsbury	6,042	12.5
Republican	Lee Gentry	706	1.5
Total votes		48,255	100.0

=== Libertarian primary ===
==== Candidates ====
===== Nominee =====
- Warren Severin, businessman and nominee for the seat in 2006

==== Results ====
Libertarian primary results
Party	Candidate	Votes	%
Libertarian	Warren Severin	207	100.0
Total votes		207	100.0

=== General election ===
==== Debates ====
- Complete video of debate, October 20, 2008

==== Polling ====
Poll source	Date(s) administered	Sample size	Margin of error	Harry Mitchell (D)	David Schweikert (R)	Undecided
Bennett, Petts, and Normington (D)	March 9–11, 2008	400 (LV)	±4.9%	50%	24%	26%

Hypothetical polling

Poll source	Date(s) administered	Sample size	Margin of error	Harry Mitchell (D)	Laura Knaperek (R)	Undecided
Bennett, Petts, and Normington (D)]	March 9–11, 2008	400 (LV)	±4.9%	49%	26%	25%

==== Predictions ====
Source	Ranking	As of
The Cook Political Report	Likely D	November 6, 2008
Rothenberg	Safe D	November 2, 2008
Sabato's Crystal Ball	Lean D	November 6, 2008
Real Clear Politics	Safe D	November 7, 2008
CQ Politics	Lean D	November 6, 2008

==== Results ====
Arizona's 5th congressional district election, 2008
Party	Candidate	Votes	%
Democratic	Harry Mitchell (incumbent)	149,033	53.2
Republican	David Schweikert	122,165	43.6
Libertarian	Warren Severin	9,158	3.3
Write-In	Ralph Hughes	9	0.0
Total votes		280,365	100.0
Democratic hold			

- Race ranking and details from CQ Politics
- Campaign contributions from OpenSecrets

== District 6 ==
2008 Arizona's 6th congressional district election
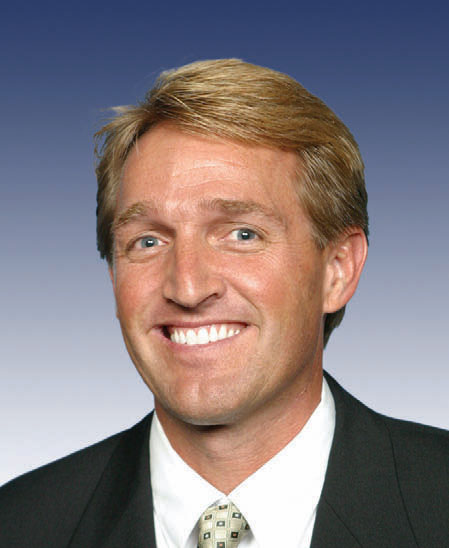

Nominee	Jeff Flake	Rebecca Schneider
Party	Republican	Democratic
Popular vote	208,582	115,457
Percentage	62.4%	34.6%
- County results Flake: 50–60% 60–70%
U.S. Representative before election
Jeff Flake
Republican
Elected U.S. Representative
Jeff Flake
Republican

Incumbent Republican Jeff Flake, who had represented the district since 2001, ran for re-election. He was re-elected with 74.8% of the vote in 2006. There was no Democratic candidate in the heavily Republican district in 2004 or 2006. George W. Bush won with 64% here in 2004. The district had a PVI of R+12.

=== Republican primary ===
Flake, who was perhaps best known for his opposition to pork barrel projects and advocacy for earmark reform ran unopposed.

==== Candidates ====
===== Nominee =====
- Jeff Flake, incumbent U.S. Representative (campaign website)

==== Results ====
Republican primary results
Party	Candidate	Votes	%
Republican	Jeff Flake (incumbent)	51,562	100.0
Total votes		51,562	100.0

=== Democratic primary ===
==== Candidates ====
Richard Grayson, an Apache Junction resident who ran as a write-in candidate in Florida's 4th congressional district in 2004, filed with the Federal Election Commission to run for the seat as a Democrat, as did trucking-firm account manager Chris Gramazio. Rebecca Schneider (campaign website), a library supervisor from Mesa, also filed and defeated Gramazio in the Democratic primary.

===== Nominee =====
- Rebecca Schneider, library supervisor (D-Mesa)

===== Eliminated in primary =====
- Chris Gramazio, trucking-firm account manager

===== Withdrawn =====
- Richard Grayson, perennial candidate

==== Results ====
Democratic primary results
Party	Candidate	Votes	%
Democratic	Rebecca Schneider	15,644	73.8
Democratic	Chris Gramazio	5,568	26.2
Total votes		21,212	100.0

=== Libertarian primary ===
==== Candidates ====
===== Nominee =====
- Rick Biondi

==== Results ====
Libertarian primary results
Party	Candidate	Votes	%
Libertarian	Rick Biondi	175	100.0
Total votes		175	100.0

=== General election ===
==== Predictions ====
Source	Ranking	As of
The Cook Political Report	Safe R	November 6, 2008
Rothenberg	Safe R	November 2, 2008
Sabato's Crystal Ball	Safe R	November 6, 2008
Real Clear Politics	Safe R	November 7, 2008
CQ Politics	Safe R	November 6, 2008

==== Results ====
Arizona's 6th congressional district election, 2008
Party	Candidate	Votes	%
Republican	Jeff Flake (incumbent)	208,582	62.4
Democratic	Rebecca Schneider	115,457	34.6
Libertarian	Rick Biondi	10,137	3.0
Total votes		334,176	100.0
Republican hold			

- Race ranking and details from CQ Politics
- Campaign contributions from OpenSecrets

== District 7 ==
2008 Arizona's 7th congressional district election
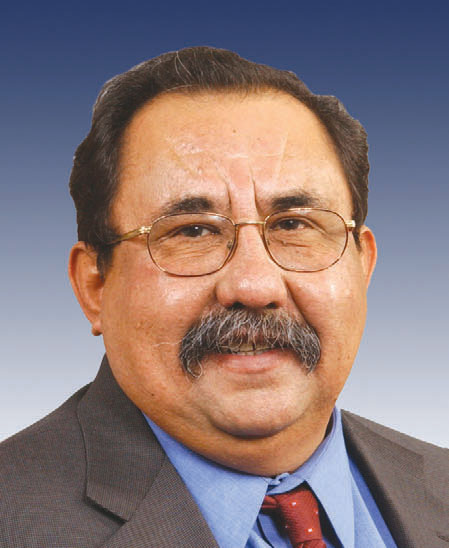

Nominee	Raúl Grijalva	Joseph Sweeney
Party	Democratic	Republican
Popular vote	124,304	64,425
Percentage	63.3%	32.8%
- County results Grijalva: 40–50% 50–60% 70–80% Sweeney: 50–60%
U.S. Representative before election
Raúl Grijalva
Democratic
Elected U.S. Representative
Raúl Grijalva
Democratic

Incumbent Democrat Raúl Grijalva, who had represented the district since 2003, ran for re-election. He was re-elected with 61.1% of the vote in 2006. The district had a PVI of D+10.

=== Democratic primary ===
==== Candidates ====
===== Nominee =====
- Raúl Grijalva, incumbent U.S. Representative

==== Results ====
Democratic primary results
Party	Candidate	Votes	%
Democratic	Raúl Grijalva (incumbent)	30,630	100.0
Total votes		30,630	100.0

=== Republican primary ===
==== Candidates ====
===== Nominee =====
- Joseph Sweeney, educator, nominee for the seat in 2004 and candidate in 2000, 2002, and 2006

===== Eliminated in primary =====
- Milton Chewning (campaign website) dead link

==== Results ====
Republican primary results
Party	Candidate	Votes	%
Republican	Joseph Sweeney	11,011	66.8
Republican	Milton Chewning	5,464	33.2
Total votes		16,475	100.0

=== Libertarian primary ===
==== Results ====
Libertarian primary results
Party	Candidate	Votes	%
Libertarian	Raymond Petrulsky (write-in)	33	100.0
Total votes		33	100.0

=== General election ===
==== Predictions ====
Source	Ranking	As of
The Cook Political Report	Safe D	November 6, 2008
Rothenberg	Safe D	November 2, 2008
Sabato's Crystal Ball	Safe D	November 6, 2008
Real Clear Politics	Safe D	November 7, 2008
CQ Politics	Safe D	November 6, 2008

==== Results ====
Arizona's 7th congressional district election, 2008
Party	Candidate	Votes	%
Democratic	Raúl Grijalva (incumbent)	124,304	63.3
Republican	Joseph Sweeney	64,425	32.8
Libertarian	Raymond Petrulsky	7,755	4.0
Write-In	Harley Meyer	5	0.0
Total votes		196,489	100.0
Democratic hold			

- Race ranking and details from CQ Politics
- Campaign contributions from OpenSecrets

== District 8 ==
2008 Arizona's 8th congressional district election
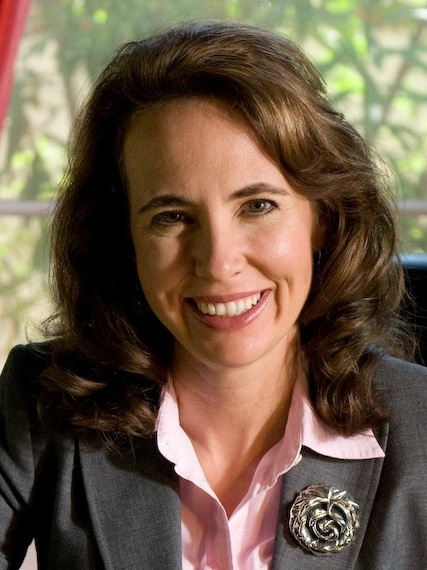

Nominee	Gabby Giffords	Tim Bee
Party	Democratic	Republican
Popular vote	179,629	140,553
Percentage	54.7%	42.8%
- County results Giffords: 40–50% 50–60% Bee: 50–60%
U.S. Representative before election
Gabby Giffords
Democratic
Elected U.S. Representative
Gabby Giffords
Democratic

Incumbent Democrat Gabby Giffords, who had represented the district since 2007, ran for re-election. She was elected with 54.3% of the vote in 2006. The district had a PVI of R+1.

George W. Bush narrowly won here with 52% to 47% for John Kerry in 2004.

=== Democratic primary ===
==== Candidates ====
===== Nominee =====
- Gabby Giffords, incumbent U.S. Representative

==== Results ====
Democratic primary results
Party	Candidate	Votes	%
Democratic	Gabby Giffords (incumbent)	46,223	100.0
Total votes		46,223	100.0

=== Republican primary ===
==== Candidates ====
===== Nominee =====
- Tim Bee, president of the Arizona Senate

==== Results ====
Republican primary results
Party	Candidate	Votes	%
Republican	Tim Bee	52,671	100.0
Total votes		52,671	100.0

=== Libertarian primary ===
==== Results ====
Libertarian primary results
Party	Candidate	Votes	%
Libertarian	Paul Davis (write-in)	40	100.0
Total votes		40	100.0

=== Independents ===
Derek Tidball (campaign website) also ran.

=== General election ===
==== Campaign ====
Early in the campaign, Bee was assessed by the Rothenberg Political Report to be the number one challenger race in the nation saying "In 2008, Giffords will face state Senate President Tim Bee (R), whose candidacy represents a slice of sunshine in an otherwise gloomy election cycle for national Republicans... the 8th District should feature one of the most competitive races for the House in the country." Roll Call said said that Bee's candidacy "erases some key advantages the freshman incumbent carried into her successful 2006 Congressional campaign."

Giffords attracted a lot of attention in late May and June due to the shuttle flight of her husband Mark E. Kelly, who served as commander of the space shuttle's STS-124 mission. Bee's campaign generated state and national press coverage when his campaign co-chair, former Congressman Jim Kolbe, resigned and withdrew his support in early July. Kolbe had held the seat for 22 years until Giffords took office in 2007.

On July 13, the Arizona Republic summarized the race: "Giffords has proved adept at fundraising and is considered a rising star in Democratic circles. But Bee is one of the state's highest-profile political figures and has enlisted the support of some heavy-hitters, including President George W. Bush, the headliner of a Tucson fundraiser planned for later this month." Giffords has the "advantages of incumbency. Plus, Bee is just off a tough legislative term in which he drew heavy criticism for his role in a state budget deal and the referral of an anti-gay-marriage proposal to the November ballot. Bee remains a popular political figure, and registered Republicans outnumber Democrats by more than 14,000 in the district." On July 16, the Arizona Republic reported that freshman Congresswoman Giffords "has proved to be the most successful fundraiser among the state's House delegation and now has more than $2 million in her campaign coffers."

==== Polling ====
Bee (R) vs Giffords (D-i) graph of collected poll results from Pollster.com

Poll source	Date(s) administered	Sample size	Margin of error	Gabby Giffords (D)	Tim Bee (R)	Undecided
Greenberg Quinlan Rosner (D)	June 18–22, 2008	502 (LV)	±?%	58%	32%	10%
Kenski (R-Bee)	May 15–23, 2008	500 (LV)	±?%	47%	40%	13%

==== Predictions ====
Source	Ranking	As of
The Cook Political Report	Likely D	November 6, 2008
Rothenberg	Safe D	November 2, 2008
Sabato's Crystal Ball	Lean D	November 6, 2008
Real Clear Politics	Safe D	November 7, 2008
CQ Politics	Lean D	November 6, 2008

==== Results ====
Arizona's 8th congressional district election, 2008
Party	Candidate	Votes	%
Democratic	Gabby Giffords (incumbent)	179,629	54.7
Republican	Tim Bee	140,553	42.8
Libertarian	Paul Davis	8,081	2.5
Write-In	Paul Price	3	0.0
Total votes		328,266	100.0
Democratic hold			

- Race ranking and details from CQ Politics
- Campaign contributions from OpenSecrets

Preceded by 2006 elections	United States House elections in Arizona; 2008	Succeeded by 2010 elections
