= 2010 United States House of Representatives elections in Arizona =

- November 2, 2010

All 8 Arizona seats to the United States House of Representatives
- Turnout: 55.65%
	Majority party	Minority party
Party	Republican	Democratic
Last election	3	5
Seats won	5	3
Seat change	▲2	▼2
Popular vote	900,510	711,837
Percentage	53.03%	41.92%
Swing	▲9.00%	▼3.55%

Republican
40–50%
50–60%
60–70%
70–80%
Democratic
40–50%
50–60%
60–70%

The 2010 congressional elections in Arizona were held on November 2, 2010, to determine who would represent the state of Arizona in the United States House of Representatives. Arizona had eight seats in the House, apportioned according to the 2000 United States census. Representatives were elected for two-year terms; those elected were to serve in the 112th Congress from January 3, 2011, until January 3, 2013.

The state's 2009-2010 delegation consisted of five Democrats and three Republicans. With the exception of Democrat Ann Kirkpatrick, who had won the open seat in District 1 during the previous election, all members of the delegation were incumbents who had served for at least a full term in Congress. Also, with the exception of retiring Republican John Shadegg of District 3, all incumbent members of the state's delegation ran for re-election.

As of August 17, 2010, Districts 1, 5 and 8, all held by Democrats, were considered to be competitive by both CQ Politics and The Cook Political Report. The primary elections for Congressional races were held on August 24, 2010.

== Overview ==
The table below shows the total number and percentage of votes, as well as the number of seats gained and lost by each political party in the election for the United States House of Representatives in Arizona. In addition, the voter turnout and the number of votes not valid will be listed below.

=== Statewide ===
Party	Candidates	Votes		Seats		
Party	Candidates	No.	%	No.	+/–	%
Republican	8	900,510	53.03	5	▲2	62.50
Democratic	8	711,837	41.92	3	▼2	37.50
Libertarian	8	72,216	4.25	0	Steady	0.0
Green	3	9,066	0.53	0	Steady	0.0
Independent	1	4,506	0.27	0	Steady	0.0
Total	28	1,698,135	100.0	8	Steady	100.0

Popular vote
Republican	53.03%
Democratic	41.92%
Libertarian	4.25%
Green	0.53%
Other	0.27%

House seats
Republican	62.50%
Democratic	37.50%

=== By district ===
Results of the 2010 United States House of Representatives elections in Arizona by district:

District	Republican		Democratic		Others		Total		Result
District	Votes	%	Votes	%	Votes	%	Votes	%	Result
District 1	112,816	49.72%	99,233	43.73%	14,869	6.55%	226,918	100.0%	Republican gain
District 2	173,173	64.88%	82,891	31.06%	10,830	4.06%	266,894	100.0%	Republican hold
District 3	108,689	52.24%	85,610	41.14%	13,772	6.62%	208,071	100.0%	Republican hold
District 4	25,300	27.53%	61,524	66.94%	5,083	5.53%	91,907	100.0%	Democratic hold
District 5	110,374	52.00%	91,749	43.23%	10,127	4.77%	212,250	100.0%	Republican gain
District 6	165,649	66.42%	72,615	29.12%	11,119	4.46%	249,383	100.0%	Republican hold
District 7	70,385	44.23%	79,935	50.23%	8,824	5.54%	159,144	100.0%	Democratic hold
District 8	134,124	47.30%	138,280	48.76%	11,174	3.94%	283,578	100.0%	Democratic hold
Total	900,510	53.03%	711,837	41.92%	85,798	5.05%	1,698,145	100.0%	

== District 1 ==
2010 Arizona's 1st congressional district election
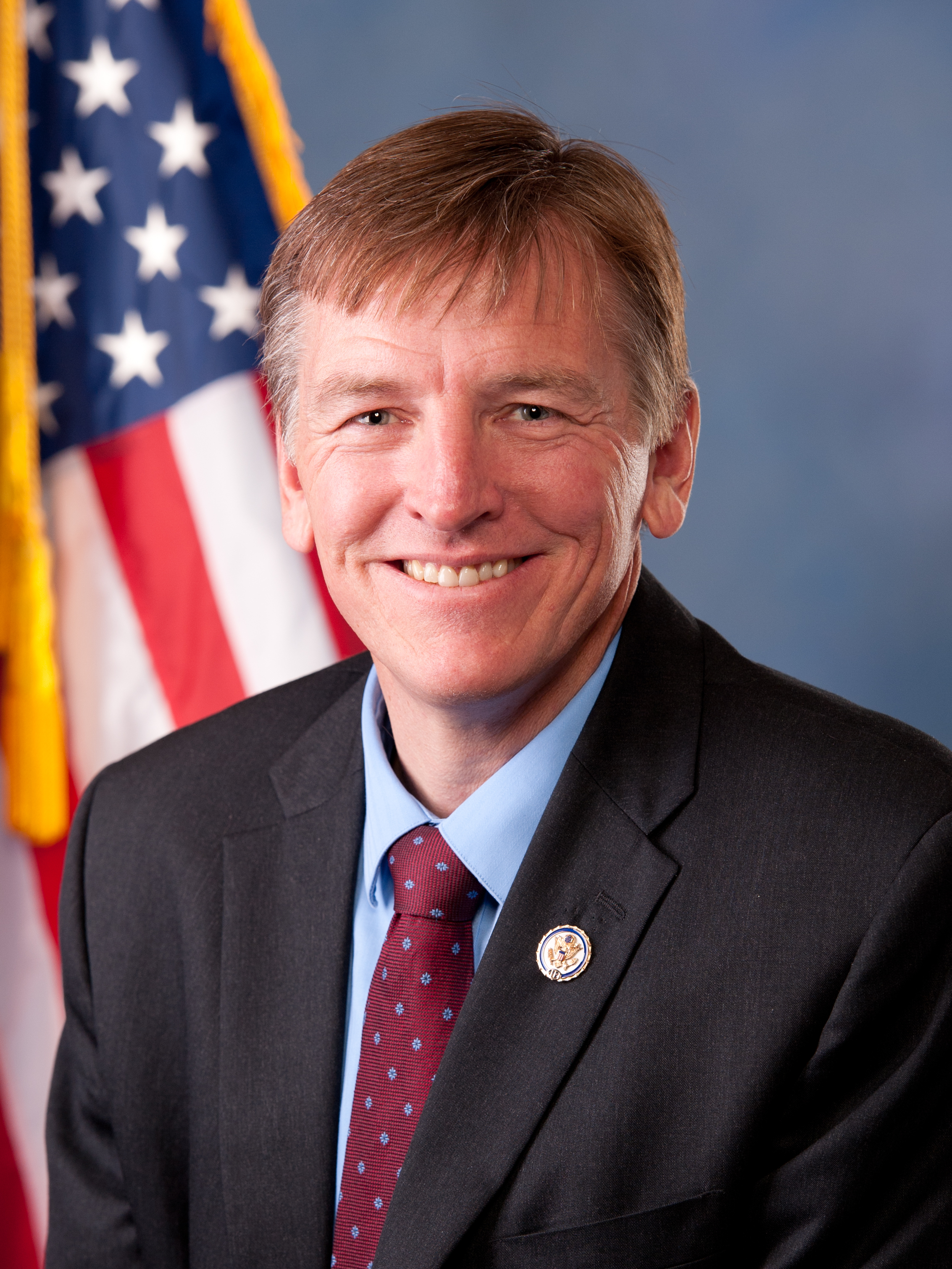

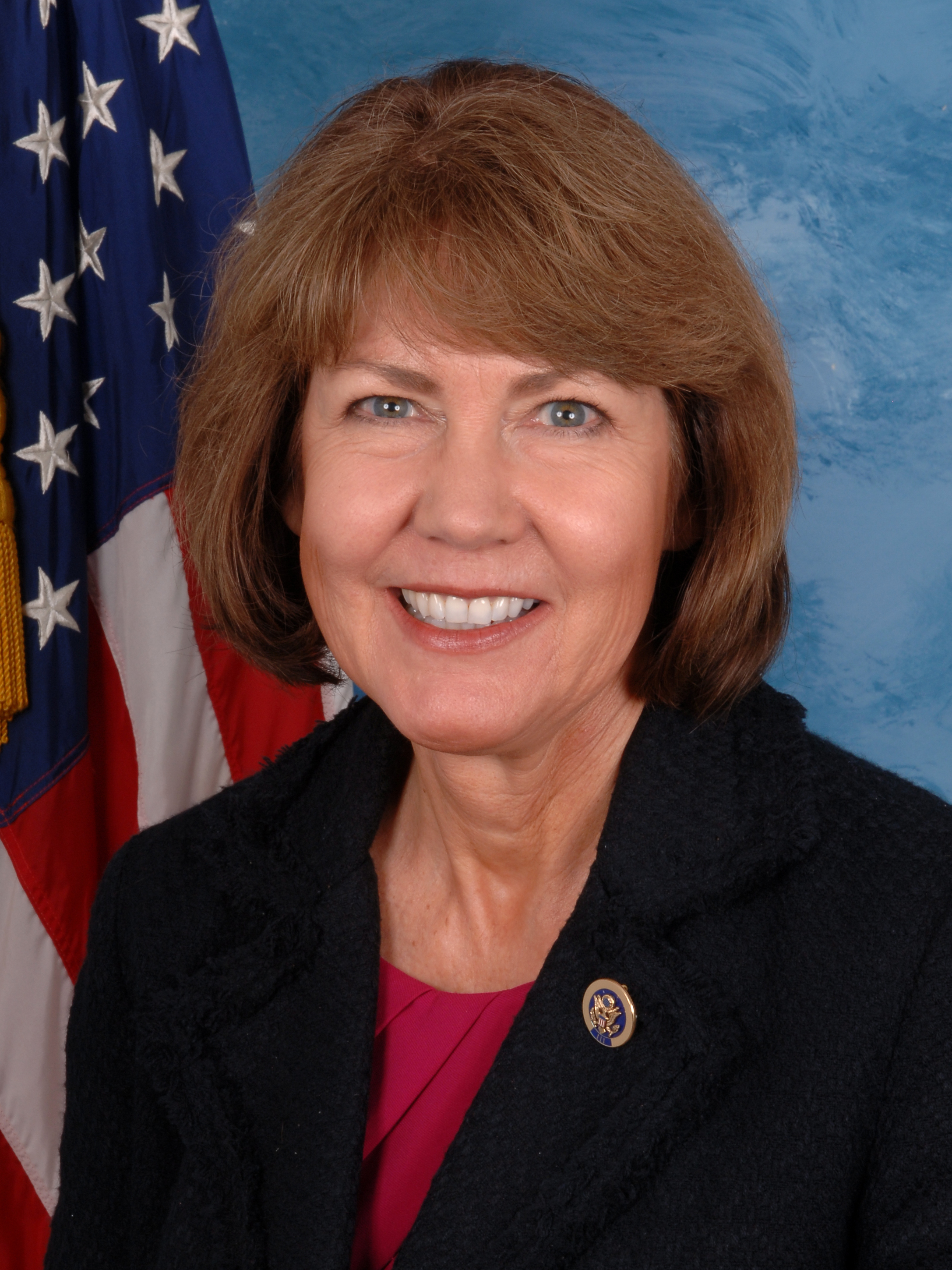

Nominee	Paul Gosar	Ann Kirkpatrick	Nicole Patti
Party	Republican	Democratic	Libertarian
Popular vote	112,816	99,233	14,869
Percentage	49.7%	43.7%	6.6%
- County results Kirkpatrick: 50–60% 60–70% Gosar: 40–50% 50–60%
U.S. Representative before election
Ann Kirkpatrick
Democratic
Elected U.S. Representative
Paul Gosar
Republican

Incumbent Democrat Ann Kirkpatrick, who had represented the district since 2009, ran for re-election. She was elected with 55.9% of the vote in 2008 and the district had a PVI of R+6.

=== Democratic primary ===
==== Candidates ====
===== Nominee =====
- Ann Kirkpatrick, incumbent U.S. Representative

==== Results ====
Democratic primary results
Party	Candidate	Votes	%
Democratic	Ann Kirkpatrick (incumbent)	46,902	100.0
Total votes		46,902	100.0

=== Republican primary ===
The Republican primary featured 8 candidates seeking to take on Kirkpatrick in the general election. Mining industry lobbyist Sydney Hay, who had been the Republican nominee to run against Kirkpatrick in 2008, finished second in the primary behind dentist Paul Gosar. Other unsuccessful Republican candidates included attorney Bradley Beauchamp and former state legislator Russell Bowers.

==== Candidates ====
===== Nominee =====
- Paul Gosar, dentist

===== Eliminated in primary =====
- Bradley Beauchamp, attorney
- Russell Bowers, former state senator
- Sydney Hay, mining industry lobbyist, nominee for this seat in 2008 and candidate in 2002
- Joe Jaraczewski, former real estate development company owner
- Jon Jensen, former Greeley County School Superintendent
- Steve Mehta, cardiologist
- Thomas J. Zaleski, President at Thoma Capital Management LLC

===== Withdrawn =====
- Paul Burton

==== Endorsements ====
Paul Gosar

Statewide officials

- Sarah Palin, former Governor of Alaska and nominee for Vice President of the United States in 2008

Local officials

- Joe Arpaio, Sheriff of Maricopa County
- Paul Babeu, Sheriff of Pinal County
Steve Mehta

Newspapers

- The Arizona Republic

==== Results ====
Gosar, a political neophyte, buoyed by endorsements from highly visible Republican politicians, including Sarah Palin, won the primary with just under 31% of the vote.

Republican primary results
Party	Candidate	Votes	%
Republican	Paul Gosar	21,941	30.7
Republican	Sydney Hay	16,328	22.9
Republican	Bradley Beauchamp	11,356	15.9
Republican	Russell Bowers	10,552	14.8
Republican	Steve Mehta	5,846	8.2
Republican	Thomas J. Zaleski	2,105	3.0
Republican	Jon Jensen	1,736	2.4
Republican	Joe Jaraczewski	1,530	2.1
Total votes		71,394	100.0

=== Libertarian primary ===
==== Candidates ====
===== Nominee =====
- Nicole Patti (PVS)

==== Results ====
Libertarian primary results
Party	Candidate	Votes	%
Libertarian	Nicole Patti (write-in)	23	100.0
Total votes		23	100.0

=== General election ===
Prior to Kirkpatrick's election in 2008, the 1st district had been held by Republicans since this version of the seat was created following the 2000 census.

==== Polling ====
Poll source	Date(s) administered	Sample size	Margin of error	Ann Kirkpatrick (D)	Paul Gosar (R)	Nicole Patti (L)	Undecided
Lake Research Partners (D)	October 12–14, 2010	500 (LV)	±4.4%	41%	38%	6%	15%
The Hill/ANGA	September 25–30, 2010	403 (LV)	±4.9%	39%	46%	3%	12%
Moore Information (R)	August 30–31, 2010	412 (LV)	±4.8%	43%	43%	–	14%
American Action Forum	August 25–29, 2010	400 (LV)	±4.9%	41%	47%	–	12%
Lake Research Partners (D)	August 24–26, 2010	500 (LV)	±4.4%	43%	39%	–	17%

==== Predictions ====
Source	Ranking	As of
The Cook Political Report	Lean R (flip)	November 1, 2010
Rothenberg	Lean R (flip)	November 1, 2010
Sabato's Crystal Ball	Lean R (flip)	November 1, 2010
RCP	Lean R (flip)	November 1, 2010
CQ Politics	Lean R (flip)	October 28, 2010
New York Times	Lean R (flip)	November 1, 2010
FiveThirtyEight	Likely R (flip)	November 1, 2010

==== Results ====
Kirkpatrick lost on November 2, 2010, to Paul Gosar and the seat reverted to the Republicans.

Arizona's 1st congressional district, 2010
Party	Candidate	Votes	%
Republican	Paul Gosar	112,816	49.7
Democratic	Ann Kirkpatrick (incumbent)	99,233	43.7
Libertarian	Nicole Patti	14,869	6.6
Majority		13,583	6.0
Total votes		226,918	100.0
Republican gain from Democratic			

- Race ranking and details from CQ Politics
- Campaign contributions from OpenSecrets
- Race profile at The New York Times

== District 2 ==
2010 Arizona's 2nd congressional district election
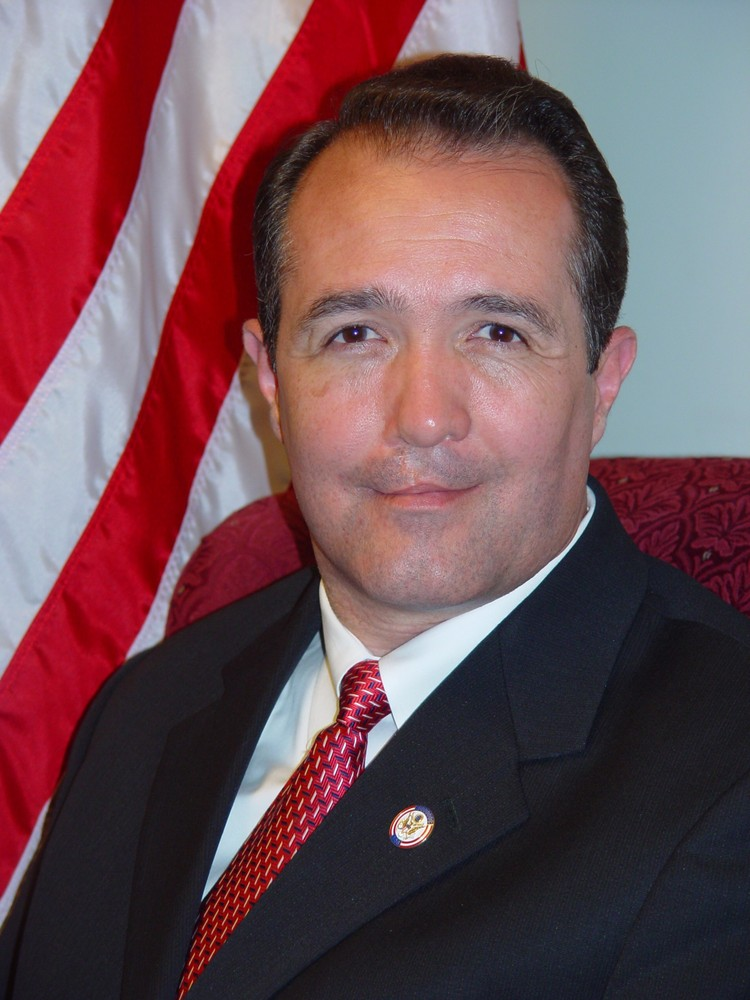

Nominee	Trent Franks	John Thrasher
Party	Republican	Democratic
Popular vote	173,173	82,891
Percentage	64.9%	31.0%
- County results Franks: 60–70% 70–80% Thrasher: 70–80%
U.S. Representative before election
Trent Franks
Republican
Elected U.S. Representative
Trent Franks
Republican

Incumbent Republican Trent Franks, who had represented the district since 2003, ran for re-election. He was re-elected with 59.4% of the vote in 2008 and the district had a PVI of R+13.

=== Republican primary ===
==== Candidates ====
===== Nominee =====
- Trent Franks, incumbent U.S. Representative

===== Eliminated in primary =====
- Charles Black, U.S. Army veteran and contractor

==== Results ====
Franks won an easy victory with over 80% of the vote in his favour.

Republican primary results
Party	Candidate	Votes	%
Republican	Trent Franks (incumbent)	81,252	80.9
Republican	Charles Black	19,220	19.1
Total votes		100,472	100.0

=== Democratic primary ===
Retired teacher John Thrasher ran unopposed for the Democratic nomination. Thrasher has twice attempted to unseat Franks, losing to the incumbent by 19% in 2006 and by 22% in 2008.(campaign site, PVS)

==== Candidates ====
===== Nominee =====
- John Thrasher, retired teacher and nominee for this seat in 2006 and 2008

==== Results ====
Democratic primary results
Party	Candidate	Votes	%
Democratic	John Thrasher	32,503	100.0
Total votes		32,503	100.0

=== Libertarian primary ===
==== Candidates ====
===== Nominee =====
- Powell Gammill, retired biologist and nominee for this seat in 2004, 2006 and 2008 (campaign site, PVS).

==== Results ====
Libertarian primary results
Party	Candidate	Votes	%
Libertarian	Powell Gammill	318	100.0
Total votes		318	100.0

=== General election ===
==== Predictions ====
Source	Ranking	As of
The Cook Political Report	Safe R	November 1, 2010
Rothenberg	Safe R	November 1, 2010
Sabato's Crystal Ball	Safe R	November 1, 2010
RCP	Safe R	November 1, 2010
CQ Politics	Safe R	October 28, 2010
New York Times	Safe R	November 1, 2010
FiveThirtyEight	Safe R	November 1, 2010

==== Results ====
Arizona's 2nd congressional district election, 2010
Party	Candidate	Votes	%
Republican	Trent Franks (incumbent)	173,173	64.9
Democratic	John Thrasher	82,891	31.0
Libertarian	Powell Gammill	10,820	4.1
Majority		90,282	33.9
Total votes		266,884	100.0
Republican hold			

- Race ranking and details from CQ Politics
- Campaign contributions from OpenSecrets
- Race profile at The New York Times

== District 3 ==
2010 Arizona's 3rd congressional district election
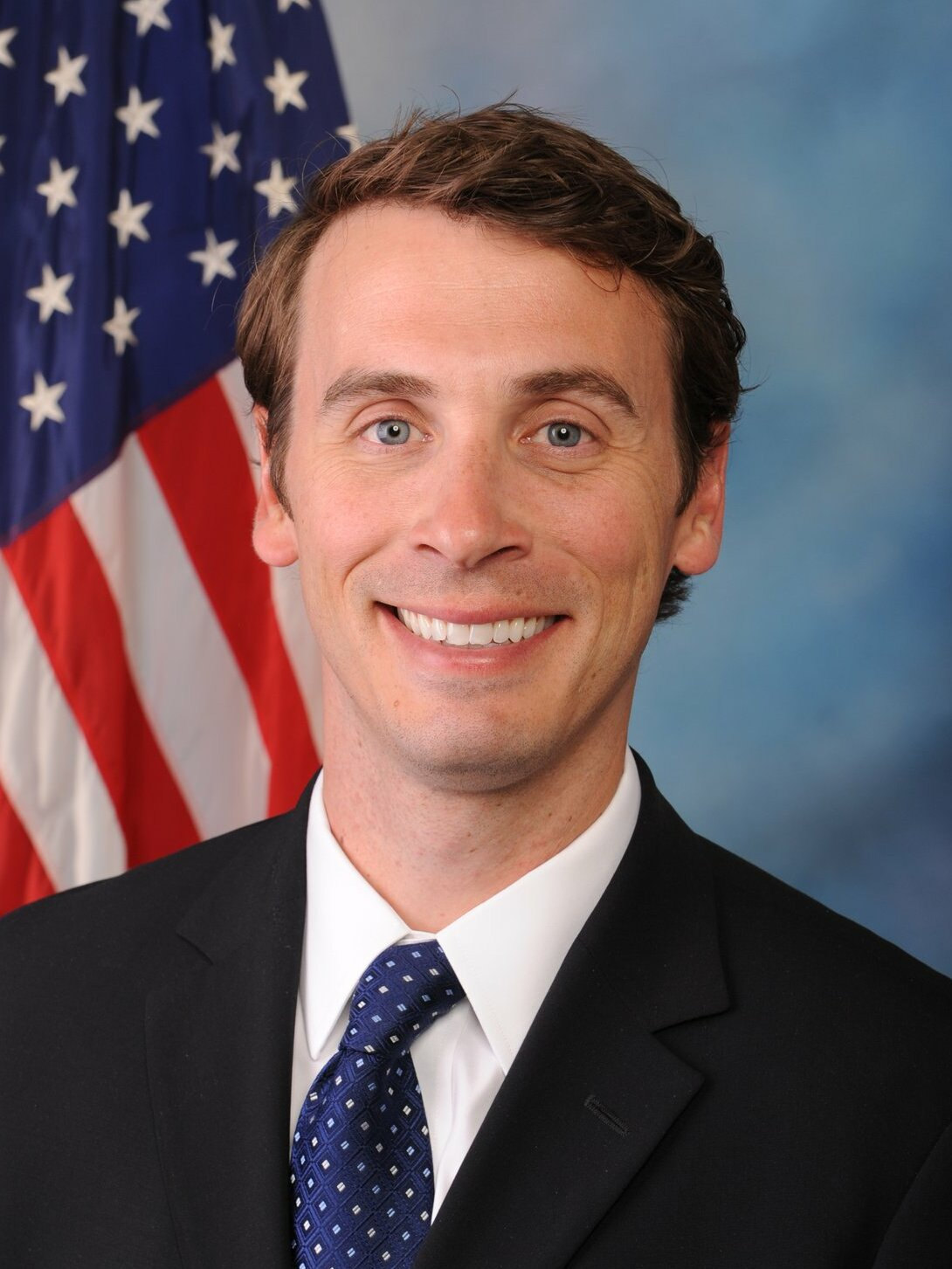

Nominee	Ben Quayle	Jon Hulburd	Michael Shoen
Party	Republican	Democratic	Libertarian
Popular vote	108,689	85,610	10,478
Percentage	52.2%	41.1%	5.0%
- Precinct results Quayle: 40–50% 50–60% 60–70% 70–80% Hulburd: 40–50% 50–60% Tie
U.S. Representative before election
John Shadegg
Republican
Elected U.S. Representative
Ben Quayle
Republican

Incumbent Republican John Shadegg, who had represented the district since 1995, retired. He was re-elected with 54.1% of the vote in 2008 and the district had a PVI of R+9.

=== Republican primary ===
On January 14, 2010, 8-term incumbent Shadegg announced his retirement at the end of his current term, making the third district an open seat. In the wake of Shadegg's retirement, several Republicans declared their candidacy.

==== Candidates ====
===== Nominee =====
- Ben Quayle, attorney and son of former Vice President of the United States Dan Quayle

===== Eliminated in primary =====
- Bob Branch, professor
- Sam Crump, state representative
- Pamela Gorman, former state senator
- LeAnn Hull, businesswoman
- Steve Moak, businessman and philanthropist
- Paulina Morris, attorney
- Vernon Parker, Mayor of Paradise Valley
- Jim Waring, former state senator
- Ed Winkler, former Mayor of Paradise Valley

===== Declined =====
- Dean Martin, State Treasurer
- Sean Noble, Shadegg's Chief of Staff
- Andrew Walter, former Arizona State University quarterback and NFL free agent
- James Weiers, state representative and former Speaker of the Arizona House of Representatives

==== Campaign ====
Gorman gained national attention during the campaign for an ad showing her firing a Thompson submachine gun, and for her cosponsorship of the highly controversial SB 1070 anti-illegal immigration bill.

Quayle, the initial frontrunner in the race, faced criticism for his prior involvement with the controversial rumour and gossip website "DirtyScottsdale.com". According to the site's founder, Quayle was one of the "original contributors" to the site, which covered Scottsdale nightlife with features including sexy photos of women, and was the predecessor to the gossip website TheDirty.com. Quayle initially denied the rumors, before admitting several weeks later that he did, in fact, write material for the site under the pen name Brock Landers. Newcomer Steve Moak's strong fundraising and television advertising blitz against Quayle saw him to be viewed as the new frontrunner, however he faced allegations that he illegally profited from a charity he had set up, hurt his campaign.

==== Results ====
Republican primary results by precinct: Quayle: 10–20%; 20–30%; 30–40%; 40–50%; Moak: 20–30%; 30–40%; Waring: 20–30%; 30–40%; 40–50%; Parker: 10–20%; 20–30%; 30–40%; Gorman: 10–20%; 20–30%; 30–40%; Morris: 20–30%; Crump: 20–30%; 30–40%; Tie

Quayle emerged victorious with 22.1% of the vote, while businessman and political neophyte Steve Moak came in second with 18%.

Republican primary results
Party	Candidate	Votes	%
Republican	Ben Quayle	17,400	22.1
Republican	Steve Moak	14,211	18.0
Republican	Jim Waring	13,850	17.6
Republican	Vernon Parker	13,411	17.0
Republican	Pamela Gorman	6,473	8.2
Republican	Paulina Morris	6,138	7.8
Republican	Sam Crump	3,886	4.9
Republican	Ed Winkler	1,353	1.7
Republican	Bob Branch	1,141	1.4
Republican	LeAnn Hull	1,044	1.3
Total votes		78,907	100.0

=== Democratic primary ===
Jon Hulburd filed his candidacy for the Democratic nomination on October 16, 2009. The Hulburd campaign got off to a strong start and raised over $300,000 in the fourth quarter of 2009. This attracted national attention with the DCCC naming the race as one of its top 17 races to watch nationwide.

==== Candidates ====
===== Nominee =====
- Jon Hulburd, attorney and small businessman

==== Results ====
Democratic primary results
Party	Candidate	Votes	%
Democratic	Jon Hulburd	27,388	100.0
Total votes		27,388	100.0

=== Libertarian primary ===
==== Candidates ====
===== Nominee =====
- Michael Shoen, attorney and nominee for this seat in 2008(campaign site PVS)

==== Results ====
Libertarian primary results
Party	Candidate	Votes	%
Libertarian	Michael Shoen	392	99.7
Libertarian	Clay Adair (write-in)	1	0.3
Total votes		393	100.0

=== Green primary ===
==== Candidates ====
===== Nominee =====
- Leonard Clark, Iraq War veteran (campaign site, PVS)

==== Results ====
Green primary results
Party	Candidate	Votes	%
Green	Leonard Clark (write-in)	5	100.0
Total votes		5	100.0

=== General election ===
==== Polling ====
Poll source	Date(s) administered	Sample size	Margin of error	Ben Quayle (R)	Jon Hulburd (D)	Undecided
Public Policy Polling	October 16–17, 2010	655 (LV)	±3.8%	44%	46%	10%

==== Predictions ====
Source	Ranking	As of
The Cook Political Report	Lean R	November 1, 2010
Rothenberg	Safe R	November 1, 2010
Sabato's Crystal Ball	Lean R	November 1, 2010
RCP	Lean R	November 1, 2010
CQ Politics	Lean R	October 28, 2010
New York Times	Tossup	November 1, 2010
FiveThirtyEight	Likely R	November 1, 2010

==== Results ====
Arizona's 3rd congressional district election, 2010
Party	Candidate	Votes	%
Republican	Ben Quayle	108,689	52.2
Democratic	Jon Hulburd	85,610	41.1
Libertarian	Michael Shoen	10,478	5.0
Green	Leonard Clark	3,294	1.6
Majority		23,079	11.1
Total votes		208,071	100.0
Republican hold			

- Race ranking and details from CQ Politics
- Campaign contributions from OpenSecrets
- Race profile at The New York Times

== District 4 ==
2012 Arizona's 4th congressional district election
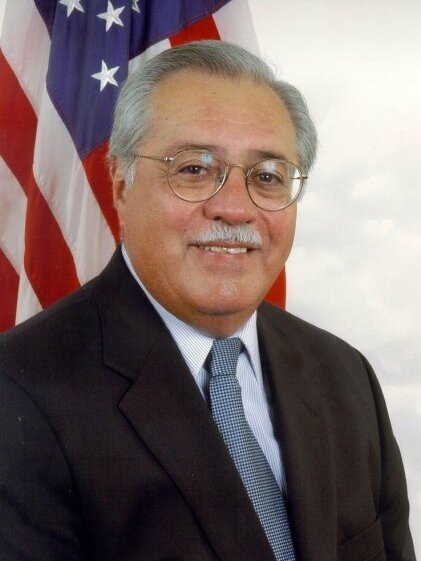

Nominee	Ed Pastor	Janet Contreras
Party	Democratic	Republican
Popular vote	61,524	25,300
Percentage	66.8%	27.5%
- County results Pastor: 60–70%
U.S. Representative before election
Ed Pastor
Democratic
Elected U.S. Representative
Ed Pastor
Democratic

Incumbent Democrat Ed Pastor, who had represented the district since 1991, ran for re-election. He was re-elected with 72.1% of the vote in 2008 and the district had a PVI of D+13. Since taking office, he has been re-elected nine times with no less than 62% of the vote.

=== Democratic primary ===
==== Candidates ====
===== Nominee =====
- Ed Pastor, incumbent U.S. Representative

==== Results ====
Democratic primary results
Party	Candidate	Votes	%
Democratic	Ed Pastor (incumbent)	24,613	100.0
Total votes		24,613	100.0

=== Republican primary ===
==== Candidates ====
===== Nominee =====
- Janet Contreras, businesswoman (campaign site, PVS)

===== Eliminated in primary =====
- Joe Peñalosa, immigration attorney

==== Results ====
Republican primary results
Party	Candidate	Votes	%
Republican	Janet Contreras	8,085	60.1
Republican	Joe Peñalosa	5,368	39.9
Total votes		13,453	100.0

=== Libertarian primary ===
==== Candidates ====
===== Nominee =====
- Joe Cobb, retired economist and nominee for this seat in 2008 (campaign site, PVS)

==== Results ====
Libertarian primary results
Party	Candidate	Votes	%
Libertarian	Joe Cobb	219	100.0
Total votes		219	100.0

=== Green primary ===
==== Candidates ====
===== Nominee =====
- Rebecca DeWitt, accountant and nominee for this seat in 2008 (campaign site, PVS)

==== Results ====
Green primary results
Party	Candidate	Votes	%
Green	Rebecca DeWitt	148	100.0
Total votes		148	100.0

=== General election ===
==== Predictions ====
Source	Ranking	As of
The Cook Political Report	Safe D	November 1, 2010
Rothenberg	Safe D	November 1, 2010
Sabato's Crystal Ball	Safe D	November 1, 2010
RCP	Safe D	November 1, 2010
CQ Politics	Safe D	October 28, 2010
New York Times	Safe D	November 1, 2010
FiveThirtyEight	Safe D	November 1, 2010

==== Results ====
Arizona's 4th congressional district election, 2010
Party	Candidate	Votes	%
Democratic	Ed Pastor (incumbent)	61,524	66.8
Republican	Janet Contreras	25,300	27.5
Libertarian	Joe Cobb	2,718	3.0
Green	Rebecca DeWitt	2,365	2.6
Majority		36,224	39.3
Total votes		91,907	100.0
Democratic hold			

- Race ranking and details from CQ Politics
- Campaign contributions from OpenSecrets
- Race profile at The New York Times

== District 5 ==
2010 Arizona's 5th congressional district election
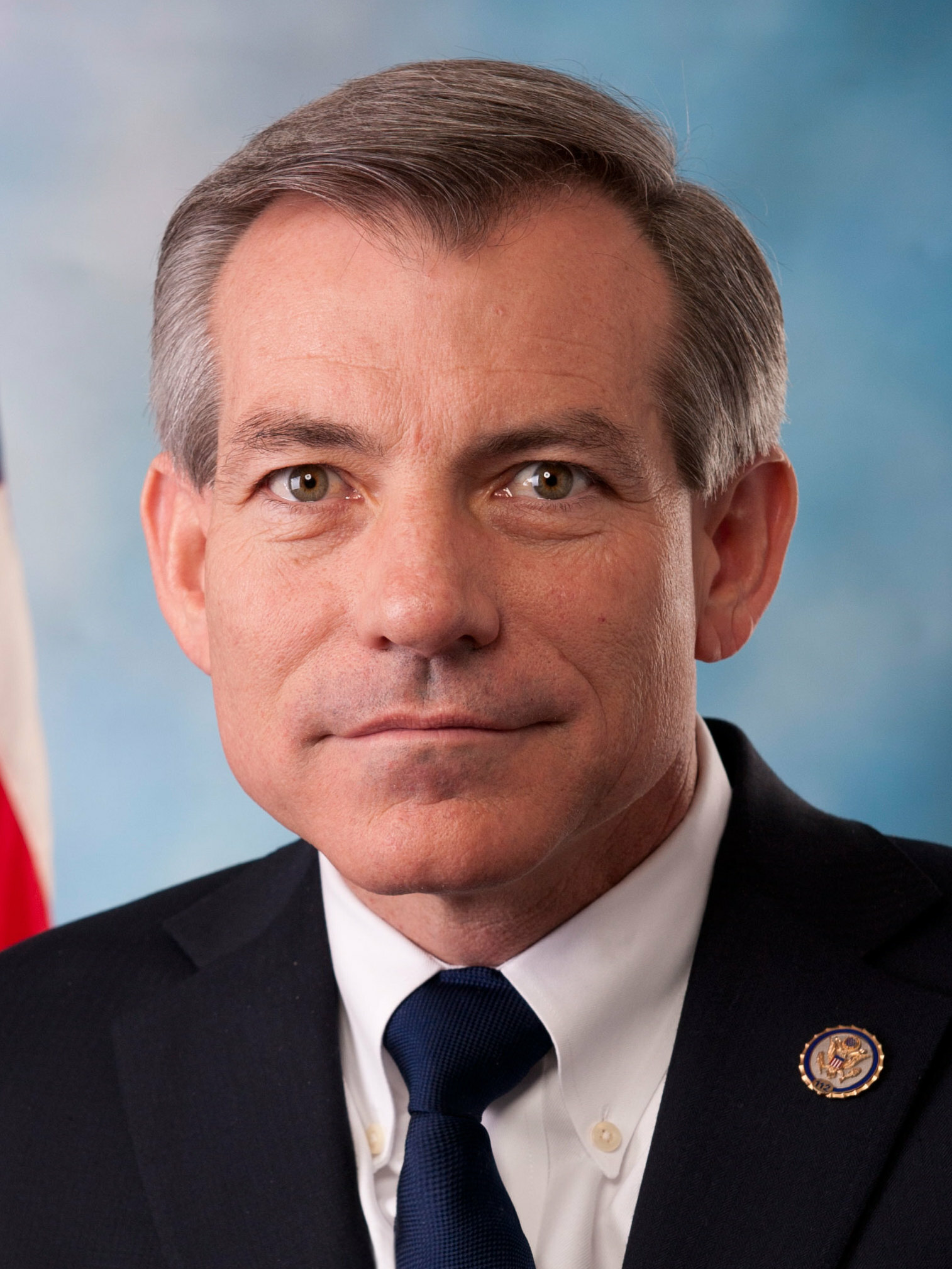

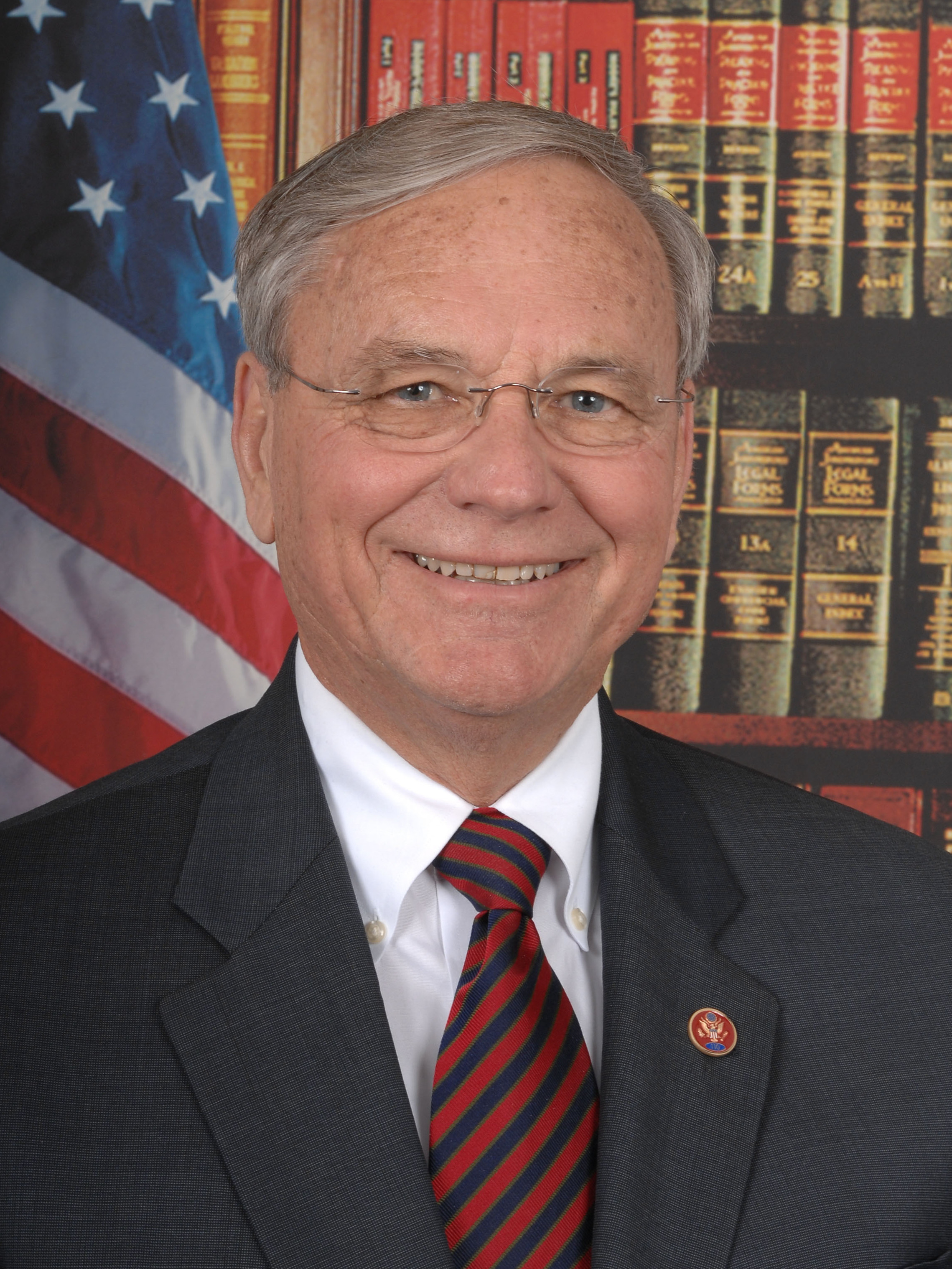
Nominee	David Schweikert	Harry Mitchell
Party	Republican	Democratic
Popular vote	110,374	91,749
Percentage	52.0%	43.2%
- Precinct results Schweikert: 40–50% 50–60% 60–70% 70–80% 80–90% Mitchell: 40–50% 50–60% 60–70% 70–80% Tie No votes
U.S. Representative before election
Harry Mitchell
Democratic
Elected U.S. Representative
David Schweikert
Republican

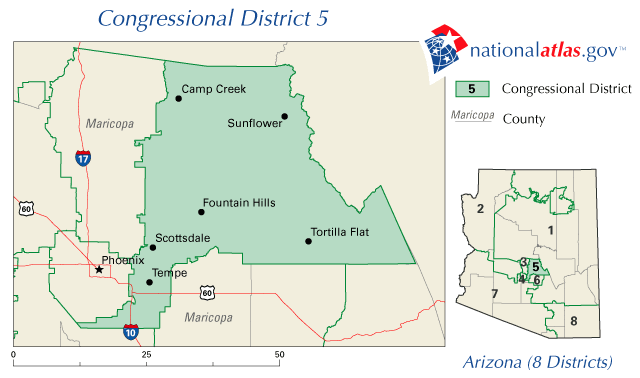

Incumbent Democrat Harry Mitchell, who had represented the district since 2007, ran for re-election. He was re-elected with 53.2% of the vote in 2008 and the district had a PVI of R+5.

=== Democratic primary ===
==== Candidates ====
===== Nominee =====
- Harry Mitchell, incumbent U.S. Representative

==== Results ====
Democratic primary results
Party	Candidate	Votes	%
Democratic	Harry Mitchell (incumbent)	29,716	100.0
Total votes		29,716	100.0

=== Republican primary ===
==== Candidates ====
===== Nominee =====
- David Schweikert, former Maricopa County Treasurer, former state representative, nominee for this seat in 2008 and candidate in 1994

===== Eliminated in primary =====
- Susan Bitter Smith, former Scottsdale city council member, candidate for the 1st District in 1994 and 2000 and for this seat in 2008.
- Lee Gentry, business owner, attorney, certified public accountant and candidate for this seat in 2008
- Chris Salvino, surgeon
- Mark Spinks, realtor
- Jim Ward, venture capitalist

===== Withdrawn =====
- Eric Wnuck, businessman

==== Results ====
Republican primary results by precinct: Schweikert: 20–30%; 30–40%; 40–50%; 50–60%; Ward: 20–30%; 30–40%; 40–50%; Bitter Smith: 20–30%; 30–40%; 40–50%; Tie: 20–30%; 30–40%

Schweikert's victory sets up a rematch against Mitchell, who defeated him 53-44% in the 2008 general election.

Republican primary results
Party	Candidate	Votes	%
Republican	David Schweikert	26,678	37.2
Republican	Jim Ward	18,480	25.8
Republican	Susan Bitter Smith	17,297	24.1
Republican	Chris Salvino	7,156	10.0
Republican	Lee Gentry	1,157	1.6
Republican	Mark Spinks	884	1.2
Total votes		71,652	100.0

=== Libertarian primary ===
==== Candidates ====
===== Nominee =====
- Nick Coons (campaign site, PVS).

==== Results ====
Libertarian primary results
Party	Candidate	Votes	%
Libertarian	Nick Coons	306	100.0
Total votes		306	100.0

=== Green primary ===
==== Candidates ====
===== Nominee =====
- Ryan Blackman

==== Results ====
Green primary results
Party	Candidate	Votes	%
Green	Ryan Blackman (write-in)	4	100.0
Total votes		4	100.0

Blackman withdrew from the general election.

=== General election ===
==== Campaign ====
Prior to Mitchell's victory over incumbent conservative Republican J. D. Hayworth in 2006, the district had been held by Republicans since 1995, although it had been tending towards the Democrats. Schweikert posted signs across the district calling Mitchell a “lap dog” for Nancy Pelosi, after Mitchell voted for the 2008 bank bailout, the $787 billion stimulus law in 2009 and the Affordable Care Act in March 2010. This despite Mitchell's breaks with the Party on a number of Tax and climate change legislation.

==== Endorsements ====
David Schweikert (R)

Statewide officials

- Sarah Palin, former Governor of Alaska and nominee for Vice President in 2008

==== Debates ====
- Complete video of debate, October 12, 2010
- Complete video of debate, October 18, 2010

==== Polling ====
Poll source	Date(s) administered	Sample size	Margin of error	Harry Mitchell (D)	David Schweikert (R)	Nick Coons (L)	Undecided
Penn Schoen Berland (D)/The Hill/ANGA)	October 12–14, 2010	408 (LV)	±4.9%	42%	45%	1%	12%
Benenson Strategy Group (D)	October 5–7, 2010	400 (LV)	±4.9%	46%	39%	—	15%
National Research (R)	October 5–6, 2010	400 (LV)	±4.9%	43%	45%	—	12%
Bennett, Petts & Normington (D)	September 26–27, 2010	400 (LV)	±4.9%	43%	40%	6%	11%
Harstad Strategic Research (D)	September 13–16, 2010	509 (LV)	±4.3%	45%	44%	6%	5%
National Research (R)	August 31-September 2, 2010	400 (LV)	±4.9%	38%	46%	—	16%
American Action Forum	August 25–29, 2010	400 (LV)	±4.9%	44%	50%	—	6%

==== Predictions ====
Source	Ranking	As of
The Cook Political Report	Tossup	November 1, 2010
Rothenberg	Tilt R (flip)	November 1, 2010
Sabato's Crystal Ball	Lean R (flip)	November 1, 2010
RCP	Lean R (flip)	November 1, 2010
CQ Politics	Tossup	October 28, 2010
New York Times	Tossup	November 1, 2010
FiveThirtyEight	Lean R (flip)	November 1, 2010

==== Results ====
David Schweikert defeated Democratic incumbent Harry Mitchell on November 2, 2010, returning the seat to the Republicans.

Arizona's 5th congressional district election, 2010
Party	Candidate	Votes	%
Republican	David Schweikert	110,374	52.0
Democratic	Harry Mitchell (incumbent)	91,749	43.2
Libertarian	Nick Coons	10,127	4.8
Majority		18,625	8.8
Total votes		212,250	100.0
Republican gain from Democratic			

- Race ranking and details from CQ Politics
- Campaign contributions from OpenSecrets
- Race profile at The New York Times

== District 6 ==
2010 Arizona's 6th congressional district election
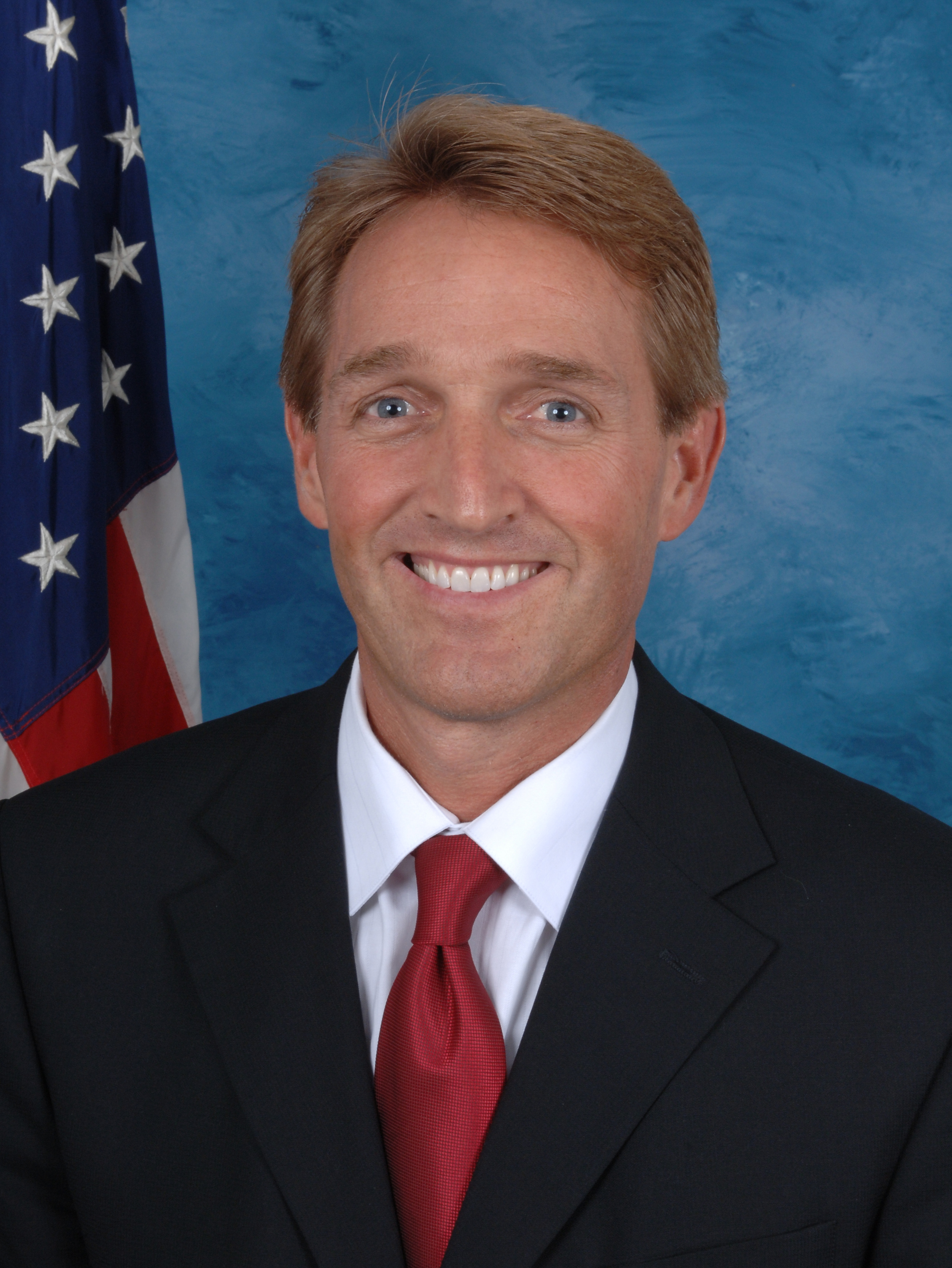

Nominee	Jeff Flake	Rebecca Schneider
Party	Republican	Democratic
Popular vote	165,649	72,615
Percentage	66.3%	29.1%
- County results Flake: 60–70%
U.S. Representative before election
Jeff Flake
Republican
Elected U.S. Representative
Jeff Flake
Republican

Incumbent Republican Jeff Flake, who had represented the district since 2001, ran for re-election. He was re-elected with 62.4% of the vote in 2008 and the district had a PVI of R+15.

=== Republican primary ===
==== Candidates ====
===== Nominee =====
- Jeff Flake, incumbent U.S. Representative

===== Eliminated in primary =====
- Jeff Smith, investor

==== Results ====
Republican primary results
Party	Candidate	Votes	%
Republican	Jeff Flake (incumbent)	62,285	64.6
Republican	Jeff Smith	34,137	35.4
Total votes		96,422	100.0

=== Democratic primary ===
==== Candidates ====
===== Nominee =====
- Rebecca Schneider, librarian and nominee for this seat in 2008 (campaign site, PVS)

===== Withdrawn =====
- Amos Chiarappa

==== Results ====
Democratic primary results
Party	Candidate	Votes	%
Democratic	Rebecca Schneider	26,220	100.0
Total votes		26,220	100.0

=== Libertarian primary ===
==== Candidates ====
===== Nominee =====
- Darell Tapp (PVS)

==== Results ====
Libertarian primary results
Party	Candidate	Votes	%
Libertarian	Darell Tapp (write-in)	28	100.0
Total votes		28	100.0

=== Green primary ===
==== Candidates ====
===== Nominee =====
- Richard Grayson, writer and perennial candidate (campaign site)

==== Results ====
Green primary results
Party	Candidate	Votes	%
Green	Richard Grayson (write-in)	6	100.0
Total votes		6	100.0

=== General election ===
==== Predictions ====
Source	Ranking	As of
The Cook Political Report	Safe R	November 1, 2010
Rothenberg	Safe R	November 1, 2010
Sabato's Crystal Ball	Safe R	November 1, 2010
RCP	Safe R	November 1, 2010
CQ Politics	Safe R	October 28, 2010
New York Times	Safe R	November 1, 2010
FiveThirtyEight	Safe R	November 1, 2010

==== Results ====
Arizona's 6th congressional district election, 2010
Party	Candidate	Votes	%
Republican	Jeff Flake (incumbent)	165,649	66.3
Democratic	Rebecca Schneider	72,615	29.1
Libertarian	Darell Tapp	7,712	3.1
Green	Richard Grayson	3,407	1.4
Majority		93,034	37.2
Total votes		249,383	100.0
Republican hold			

- Race ranking and details from CQ Politics
- Campaign contributions from OpenSecrets
- Race profile at The New York Times

== District 7 ==
2010 Arizona's 7th congressional district election
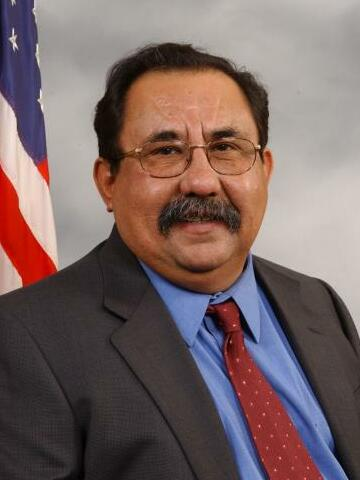

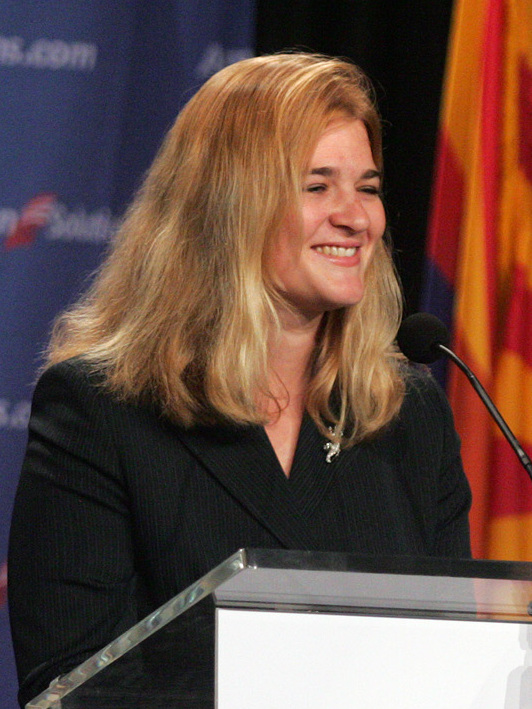
Nominee	Raúl Grijalva	Ruth McClung
Party	Democratic	Republican
Popular vote	79,935	70,385
Percentage	50.2%	44.2%
U.S. Representative before election
Raúl Grijalva
Democratic
Elected U.S. Representative
Raúl Grijalva
Democratic

Incumbent Democrat Raúl Grijalva, who had represented the district since 2003, ran for re-election. He was re-elected with 63.3% of the vote in 2008 and the district had a PVI of D+6.

=== Democratic primary ===
==== Candidates ====
===== Nominee =====
- Raúl Grijalva, incumbent U.S. Representative

==== Results ====
Democratic primary results
Party	Candidate	Votes	%
Democratic	Raúl Grijalva (incumbent)	33,931	100.0
Total votes		33,931	100.0

=== Republican primary ===
==== Candidates ====
===== Nominee =====
- Ruth McClung, physicist (campaign site, PVS)

===== Eliminated in primary =====
- Christopher J. Flowers
- Terry Myers
- Joseph Sweeney, educator, nominee for this seat in 2004 & 2008 and candidate in 2000, 2002 & 2006
- Robert Wilson

==== Results ====
Republican primary results
Party	Candidate	Votes	%
Republican	Ruth McClung	15,455	51.0
Republican	Terry Myers	7,044	23.2
Republican	Joseph Sweeney	3,702	12.2
Republican	Robert Wilson	2,737	9.0
Republican	Christopher J. Flowers	1,394	4.6
Total votes		30,332	100.0

=== Libertarian primary ===
==== Candidates ====
===== Nominee =====
- George Keane, banker (campaign site, PVS)

===== Eliminated in primary =====
- Andrew Ibarra

==== Results ====
Libertarian primary results
Party	Candidate	Votes	%
Libertarian	George Keane	159	56.8
Libertarian	Andrew Ibarra	121	43.2
Total votes		280	100.0

=== Independents ===
==== Candidates ====
===== Nominee =====
- Harley Meyer, high school teacher (campaign site, PVS).

=== General election ===
==== Campaign ====
Despite the Democratic lean of the district, Grijalva faced a tougher than expected re-election campaign following his suggestion that businesses should boycott the state in response to the passing of the highly controversial SB 1070 anti-illegal immigration bill. Both Grijalva and challenger, 28-year-old physicist Ruth McClung, benefitted from outside spending in the final weeks of the campaign, in addition to the national environment favouring the Republicans.

==== Polling ====
Poll source	Date(s) administered	Sample size	Margin of error	Raúl Grijalva (D)	Ruth McClung (R)	George Keane (L)	Harley Meyer (I)	Undecided
Summit Consulting Group	October 4–5, 2010	1,807 (LV)	±3.0%	37%	39%	—	—	24%
Magellan Strategies (R)	September 29, 2010	686 (LV)	±3.7%	40%	38%	4%	5%	13%
American Political Consultants (R)	September 25–26, 2010	450 (LV)	±4.3%	42%	35%	—	—	23%

==== Predictions ====
Source	Ranking	As of
The Cook Political Report	Tossup	November 1, 2010
Rothenberg	Lean D	November 1, 2010
Sabato's Crystal Ball	Lean D	November 1, 2010
RCP	Lean D	November 1, 2010
CQ Politics	Tossup	October 28, 2010
New York Times	Tossup	November 1, 2010
FiveThirtyEight	Likely D	November 1, 2010

==== Results ====
Two days after the election Grijalva was declared the winner, with his margin of victory being ultimately 6 points.

Arizona's 7th congressional district election, 2010
Party	Candidate	Votes	%
Democratic	Raúl Grijalva (incumbent)	79,935	50.2
Republican	Ruth McClung	70,385	44.2
Independent	Harley Meyer	4,506	2.8
Libertarian	George Keane	4,318	2.7
Majority		9,550	6.0
Total votes		159,144	100.0
Democratic hold			

- Race ranking and details from CQ Politics
- Campaign contributions from OpenSecrets
- Race profile at The New York Times

== District 8 ==
2010 Arizona's 8th congressional district election
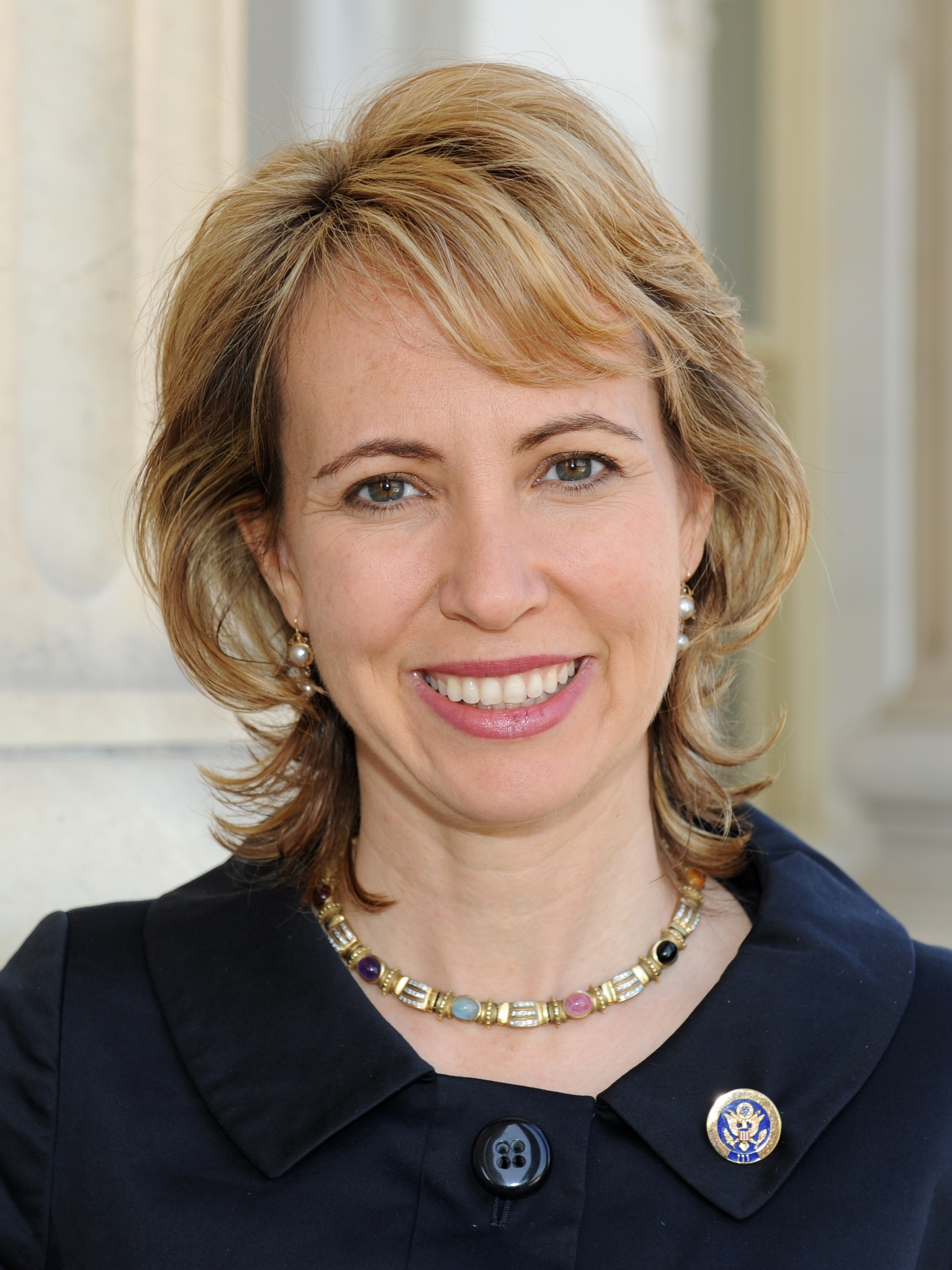

Nominee	Gabby Giffords	Jesse Kelly
Party	Democratic	Republican
Popular vote	138,280	134,124
Percentage	48.8%	47.3%
- County results Giffords: 50–60% Kelly: 50–60%
U.S. Representative before election
Gabby Giffords
Democratic
Elected U.S. Representative
Gabby Giffords
Democratic

Incumbent Democrat Gabby Giffords, who had represented the district since 2007, ran for re-election. She was re-elected with 54.7% of the vote in 2008 and the district had a PVI of R+4.

=== Democratic primary ===
==== Candidates ====
===== Nominee =====
- Gabby Giffords, incumbent U.S. Representative

==== Results ====
Democratic primary results
Party	Candidate	Votes	%
Democratic	Gabby Giffords (incumbent)	55,530	100.0
Total votes		55,530	100.0

=== Republican primary ===
==== Candidates ====
===== Nominee =====
- Jesse Kelly, Marine veteran and businessman (no relation to Giffords' husband Mark Kelly)

===== Eliminated in primary =====
- Jonathan Paton, former state senator
- Jay Quick

===== Withdrawn =====
- Andy Goss, army veteran (endorsed Kelly)
- Brian Miller, Air Force Reserve Major (endorsed Paton)

==== Debates ====
- Complete video of debate, July 30, 2010

==== Results ====
Republican primary results
Party	Candidate	Votes	%
Republican	Jesse Kelly	43,097	48.3
Republican	Jonathan Paton	37,066	41.5
Republican	Brian Miller (withdrawn)	6,613	7.4
Republican	Jay Quick	1,933	2.2
Republican	Andy Goss (withdrawn)	502	0.6
Total votes		89,211	100.0

=== Libertarian primary ===
==== Candidates ====
===== Nominee =====
- Steven Stoltz, engineer

==== Results ====
Libertarian primary results
Party	Candidate	Votes	%
Libertarian	Steven Stoltz	482	100.0
Total votes		482	100.0

=== General election ===
Prior to Giffords win in 2006, the seat had been held by Republicans since 1985 under moderate Jim Kolbe.

==== Polling ====
Poll source	Date(s) administered	Sample size	Margin of error	Gabrielle Giffords (D)	Jesse Kelly (R)	Undecided
American Action Forum	August 25–29, 2010	400 (LV)	±4.9%	46%	46%	8%

==== Predictions ====
Source	Ranking	As of
The Cook Political Report	Tossup	November 1, 2010
Rothenberg	Tossup	November 1, 2010
Sabato's Crystal Ball	Lean D	November 1, 2010
RCP	Tossup	November 1, 2010
CQ Politics	Tossup	October 28, 2010
New York Times	Tossup	November 1, 2010
FiveThirtyEight	Lean D	November 1, 2010

==== Results ====
Arizona's 8th congressional district, 2010
Party	Candidate	Votes	%
Democratic	Gabby Giffords (incumbent)	138,280	48.8
Republican	Jesse Kelly	134,124	47.3
Libertarian	Steven Stoltz	11,174	3.9
Majority		4,156	1.5
Total votes		283,578	100.0
Democratic hold			

- Race ranking and details from CQ Politics
- Campaign contributions from OpenSecrets
- Race profile at The New York Times
