= Arizona's 4th congressional district =

U.S. House district for Arizona

Coordinates: 34°35′27″N 113°12′16″W

- Interactive map of district boundaries since January 3, 2023
- Representative: Greg Stanton; D–Phoenix
- Distribution: 99.92% urban; 0.08% rural
- Population (2025): 787,461
- Median household income: $83,268
- Ethnicity: 55.2% White; 26.7% Hispanic; 5.5% Asian; 5.3% Black; 4.3% Two or more races; 2.2% Native American; 0.8% other
- Cook PVI: D+4

Arizona's 4th congressional district is a congressional district located in the U.S. state of Arizona. It is represented by Democrat Greg Stanton as of the 2022 election. The district is located entirely within Maricopa County.

== History ==
Arizona gained its fourth district after the 1970 census. It covered the entire northeastern portion of the state, from northern Phoenix all the way to the New Mexico border. However, the great majority of its vote was cast in northern Phoenix, which was heavily Republican.

With the Valley's dramatic growth over the next two decades, the district was made significantly more compact in the 1990 census, losing all of its territory outside of the Phoenix area. Like its predecessor, it was reliably Republican.

After the 2000 census, the old 4th essentially became the 3rd district. A new 4th district was created in the heavily Latino portions of inner Phoenix. This district was the only safe Democratic district in the Phoenix area, and remained in Democratic hands for its entire existence in this configuration.

After the 2010 census, this district essentially became the 7th district, while a new 4th was created in the mostly rural western and northwestern portion of the state. While the old 4th was easily the most Democratic district in Arizona, the new 4th was far and away the most Republican district in Arizona, and one of the most Republican districts in the West. In all presidential elections contested since the 2010 4th was created, it gave the Republican presidential nominee his highest margin in the state.

As of the 2020 Census redistricting, this district essentially became the 9th district, while the 4th district was reconfigured to cover most of the old 9th district. It was restricted to Maricopa County, and covered most of Tempe and portions of Phoenix, Mesa and Chandler. Due to its shares of Tempe and Phoenix, it was marginally Democratic.

== Composition ==
For the 118th and successive Congresses (based on redistricting following the 2020 census), the district contains the following counties and communities:

Maricopa County (4)
Chandler (part; also 5th), Mesa (part; also 1st and 5th), Phoenix (part; also 1st, 3rd, and 8th), Tempe (part; also 3rd)

== Recent election results from statewide races ==
Year	Office	Results
2003–2013 Boundaries
2004	President	Kerry 61.5% - 37.7%
2008	President	Obama 65.7% - 33.0%
2010	Senate	Glassman 57.4% - 36.7%
2010	Governor	Goddard 67.5% - 29.2%
2010	Secretary of State	Deschene 66.5% - 33.4%
2010	Attorney General	Rotellini 71.0% - 28.8%
2010	Treasurer	Cherny 64.7% - 28.1%
2013–2023 Boundaries
2008	President	McCain 63.9% - 34.2%
2012	President	Romney 67.2% - 31.0%
2012	Senate	Flake 60.9% - 33.4%
2014	Governor	Ducey 66.8% - 27.4%
2016	President	Trump 67.7% - 27.5%
2016	Senate	McCain 64.4% - 32.8%
2018	Senate	McSally 64.4% - 32.8%
2018	Governor	Ducey 72.9% - 25.1%
2018	Attorney General	Brnovich 69.2% - 30.7%
2020	President	Trump 68.0% - 30.6%
2020	Senate (Spec.)	McSally 67.0% - 33.0%
2023–2033 Boundaries
2016	President	Clinton 46.5% - 44.1%
2016	Senate	McCain 52.5% - 41.3%
2018	Senate	Sinema 54.4% - 43.1%
2018	Governor	Ducey 52.1% - 45.5%
2018	Attorney General	Contreras 51.1% - 48.8%
2020	President	Biden 54.2% - 43.9%
2020	Senate (Spec.)	Kelly 56.0% - 44.0%
2022	Senate	Kelly 57.0% - 40.7%
2022	Governor	Hobbs 56.1% - 43.5%
2022	Secretary of State	Fontes 58.7% - 41.2%
2022	Attorney General	Mayes 55.9% - 44.0%
2022	Treasurer	Yee 50.7% - 49.3%
2024	President	Harris 52.6% - 46.0%
2024	Senate	Gallego 56.2% - 41.1%

== List of members representing the district ==
Arizona began sending a fourth member to the House after the 1970 census.

Member	Party	Years	Cong ress	Electoral history	District location & counties
District created January 3, 1973
John Bertrand Conlan (Phoenix)	Republican	January 3, 1973 – January 3, 1977	93rd 94th	Elected in 1972. Re-elected in 1974. Retired to run for U.S. senator.	1973–1983; E Arizona, including parts of Metro Phoenix: Apache, Gila, Graham, Greenlee, Navajo, Maricopa (part), Pinal (part)
Eldon Rudd (Scottsdale)	Republican	January 3, 1977 – January 3, 1987	95th 96th 97th 98th 99th	Elected in 1976. Re-elected in 1978. Re-elected in 1980. Re-elected in 1982. Re-elected in 1984. Retired.	1973–1983; E Arizona, including parts of Metro Phoenix: Apache, Gila, Graham, Greenlee, Navajo, Maricopa (part), Pinal (part)
Eldon Rudd (Scottsdale)	Republican	January 3, 1977 – January 3, 1987	95th 96th 97th 98th 99th	Elected in 1976. Re-elected in 1978. Re-elected in 1980. Re-elected in 1982. Re-elected in 1984. Retired.	1983–1993; E Arizona, including parts of Metro Phoenix: Apache, Navajo, Gila (part), Graham (part), Maricopa (part)
Jon Kyl (Phoenix)	Republican	January 3, 1987 – January 3, 1995	100th 101st 102nd 103rd	Elected in 1986. Re-elected in 1988. Re-elected in 1990. Re-elected in 1992. Retired to run for U.S. senator.	1983–1993; E Arizona, including parts of Metro Phoenix: Apache, Navajo, Gila (part), Graham (part), Maricopa (part)
Jon Kyl (Phoenix)	Republican	January 3, 1987 – January 3, 1995	100th 101st 102nd 103rd	Elected in 1986. Re-elected in 1988. Re-elected in 1990. Re-elected in 1992. Retired to run for U.S. senator.	1993–2003; Maricopa (part / Parts of Metro Phoenix)
John Shadegg (Phoenix)	Republican	January 3, 1995 – January 3, 2003	104th 105th 106th 107th	Elected in 1994. Re-elected in 1996. Re-elected in 1998. Re-elected in 2000. Redistricted to the 3rd district.	1993–2003; Maricopa (part / Parts of Metro Phoenix)
Ed Pastor (Phoenix)	Democratic	January 3, 2003 – January 3, 2013	108th 109th 110th 111th 112th	Redistricted from the 2nd district. Re-elected in 2002. Re-elected in 2004. Re-elected in 2006. Re-elected in 2008. Re-elected in 2010. Redistricted to the 7th district.	2003–2013; Maricopa (part / Parts of Metro Phoenix) Parts of Metro Phoenix
Paul Gosar (Prescott)	Republican	January 3, 2013 – January 3, 2023	113th 114th 115th 116th 117th	Redistricted from the 1st district and re-elected in 2012. Re-elected in 2014. Re-elected in 2016. Re-elected in 2018. Re-elected in 2020. Redistricted to the 9th district.	2013–2023 Northwest Arizona: Gila (part), La Paz, Maricopa (part), Mohave (part), Yavapai (part), Yuma (part).
Greg Stanton (Phoenix)	Democratic	January 3, 2023 – present	118th 119th	Redistricted from the 9th district and re-elected in 2022. Re-elected in 2024. Re-elected in 2026.	2023–present:

== Recent election results ==
Graph of election results in Arizona's 4th congressional district and its predecessors (Since 2000) View source data.

=== 2002–2012 ===
==== 2002 ====
Arizona's 4th Congressional District House Election, 2002
Party	Candidate	Votes	%
Democratic	Ed Pastor (Incumbent)	44,517	67.4
Republican	Jonathan Barnert	18,381	27.8
Libertarian	Amy Gibbons	3,167	4.8
Majority		26,136	39.6
Total votes		66,065	100.0
Democratic win (new seat)			

==== 2004 ====
Arizona's 4th Congressional District House Election, 2004
Party	Candidate	Votes	%	±%
Democratic	Ed Pastor (Incumbent)	77,150	70.1	+2.7
Republican	Don Karg	28,238	25.7	–2.2
Libertarian	Gary Fallon	4,639	4.2	–0.6
Majority		48,912	44.5	+4.9
Total votes		110,027	100.0	
Democratic hold		Swing	+2.4	

==== 2006 ====
Arizona's 4th Congressional District House Election, 2006
Party	Candidate	Votes	%	±%
Democratic	Ed Pastor (Incumbent)	56,464	72.5	+2.4
Republican	Don Karg	18,627	23.9	–1.7
Libertarian	Ronald Harders	2,770	3.6	–0.7
Majority		37,837	48.6	+4.1
Total votes		77,861	100.0	
Democratic hold		Swing	+2.1	

==== 2008 ====
Arizona's 4th Congressional District House Election, 2008
Party	Candidate	Votes	%	±%
Democratic	Ed Pastor (Incumbent)	89,721	72.1	–0.4
Republican	Don Karg	26,435	21.3	–2.7
Green	Rebecca DeWitt	4,464	3.6	N/a
Libertarian	Joe Cobb	3,807	3.1	–0.5
Majority		63,286	50.9	+2.3
Total votes		124,427	100.0	
Democratic hold		Swing	+1.1	

==== 2010 ====
Arizona's 4th Congressional District House Election, 2010
Party	Candidate	Votes	%	±%
Democratic	Ed Pastor (Incumbent)	61,524	66.9	–5.2
Republican	Janet Contreras	25,300	27.5	+6.3
Libertarian	Joe Cobb	2,718	3.0	–0.1
Green	Rebecca DeWitt	2,365	2.6	–1.0
Majority		36,224	39.4	–11.4
Total votes		91,907	100.0	
Democratic hold		Swing	–5.7	

=== 2012–2022 ===
==== 2012 ====
Arizona's 4th Congressional District House Election, 2012
Party	Candidate	Votes	%
Republican	Paul Gosar (incumbent)	162,907	66.8
Democratic	Johnnie Robinson	69,154	28.4
Libertarian	Joe Pamelia	9,306	3.8
Americans Elect	Richard Grayson	2,393	1.0
Majority		93,753	38.5
Total votes		243,760	100.0
Republican win (new seat)			

==== 2014 ====
Arizona's 4th Congressional District House Election, 2014
Party	Candidate	Votes	%	±%
Republican	Paul Gosar (incumbent)	122,560	70.0	+3.1
Democratic	Mikel Weisser	45,179	25.8	–2.6
Libertarian	Chris Rike	7,440	4.2	+0.4
Majority		77,381	44.2	+5.7
Total votes		175,179	100.0	
Republican hold		Swing	+2.9	

==== 2016 ====
Arizona's 4th Congressional District House Election, 2016
Party	Candidate	Votes	%	±%
Republican	Paul Gosar (incumbent)	203,487	71.5	+1.5
Democratic	Mikel Weisser	81,296	28.5	+2.8
Majority		122,191	42.9	–1.3
Total votes		284,783	100.0	
Republican hold		Swing	–0.6	

==== 2018 ====
Arizona's 4th Congressional District House Election, 2018
Party	Candidate	Votes	%	±%
Republican	Paul Gosar (incumbent)	188,842	68.2	–3.3
Democratic	David Brill	84,521	30.5	+2.0
Green	Haryaksha Gregor Knauer	3,672	1.3	N/a
Majority		104,321	37.7	–5.3
Total votes		277,035	100.0	
Republican hold		Swing	–2.6	

==== 2020 ====
Arizona's 4th Congressional District House Election, 2020
Party	Candidate	Votes	%	±%
Republican	Paul Gosar (incumbent)	278,002	69.7	+1.6
Democratic	Delina DiSanto	120,484	30.2	–0.3
Write-in		137	0.0	N/a
Majority		157,518	39.5	+1.9
Total votes		398,623	100.0	
Republican hold		Swing	+0.9	

=== 2022–present ===
==== 2022 ====
Arizona's 4th Congressional District House Election, 2022
Party	Candidate	Votes	%
Democratic	Greg Stanton (incumbent)	148,941	56.1
Republican	Kelly Cooper	116,521	43.9
Independent	Stephan Jones (write-in)	36	0.0
Majority		32,420	12.2
Total votes		265,498	100.0
Democratic win (new boundaries)			

==== 2024 ====
Arizona's 4th Congressional District House Election, 2024
Party	Candidate	Votes	%	±%
Democratic	Greg Stanton (incumbent)	176,428	52.7	–3.4
Republican	Kelly Cooper	152,052	45.5	+1.6
Green	Vincent Beck-Jones	6,065	1.8	N/a
Majority		24,376	7.3	–4.9
Total votes		334,545	100.0	
Democratic hold		Swing	–2.5	

== See also ==
- Arizona's congressional districts
- List of United States congressional districts
