= Mary Kim Titla =

Native American journalist and political candidate

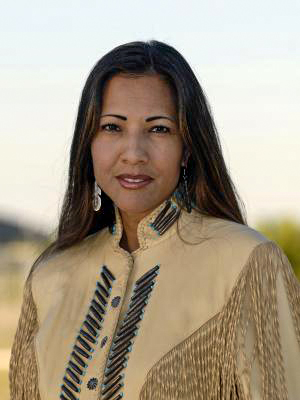
- Born: November 24, 1960 (age 65); San Carlos, Arizona, U.S.
- Citizenship: San Carlos Apache Tribe, United States
- Education: University of Oklahoma; Arizona State University
- Occupations: Executive Director, United National Indian Tribal Youth, Inc. (UNITY, Inc.)
- Notable credit: KPNX TV reporter
- Spouse: John Mosley
- Children: Jordan, Micah and Bear

Mary Kim Titla (born November 24, 1960) is a Native American publisher, youth advocate, journalist, and former TV reporter for KVOA in Tucson, where in 1987 she became the first Native American television journalist in Arizona, and later KPNX in Phoenix, and was a 2008 candidate for Arizona's First Congressional District. Titla is a self-described moderate Democrat. As an educator her personal vision is “Everyone involved in a child’s education must go above and beyond to ensure every student receives a world-class education in a safe environment.” She is an enrolled member of the San Carlos Apache Tribe.

The Democratic primary for the 1st District seat was held on September 2, 2008. Titla lost to former Arizona state representative and prosecutor Ann Kirkpatrick, who received 47%. Titla placed second, garnering 33% of the vote. Others in the primary included: Ahwatukee attorney Howard Shanker, who received 14% and former Dennis Kucinich coordinator Jeffrey Brown, who received 6%.

Titla obtained her undergraduate degree from the University of Oklahoma and her master's degree from the Walter Cronkite School of Journalism and Mass Communication at Arizona State University. In November 2006, Titla was inducted into the Cronkite School's Alumni Hall of Fame. Titla serves as executive director of United National Indian Tribal Youth (UNITY) located in Mesa, Arizona.

== See also ==
- 2008 United States House of Representatives elections in Arizona
- List of Native American politicians
- Native American women in politics
