= Ronnie Lupe =

Apache politician

Ronnie Lupe was an American politician and served as the Chairman of the White Mountain Apache Tribe from his first election to the office in 1966 and continually re-elected to the position until his retirement in 2017. The White Mountain Apache Tribe is located on the Fort Apache Indian Reservation in Arizona, north of the capital of Phoenix. He is known for his activism on such issues as land and water rights, endangered species, and tribal sovereignty. Ronnie Lupe died on August 12, 2019.

== Early life and education ==
Lupe was born in Cibecue, Arizona.

== Tribal and political activism ==
As Tribal Chairman of the White Mountain Apache, Lupe has been very active in helping the tribe retain its sovereignty and rights to its land and resources. He has helped testify for the passage of such legislation as the White Mountain Apache Tribe Water Rights Quantification Act of 2009, which helped establish a reservation-wide system for clean drinking water. He also signed and helped put together the "Statement of Relationship" policy in 1994, between the tribe and the U.S. Fish and Wildlife Service, which recognized "the tribe's aboriginal rights, sovereign authority, and institutional capacity to self-manage its lands". This event also led to the passage of the Joint Secretarial Order 3206, known as the American Indian Tribal Rights, Federal-Tribal Trust Responsibilities, and the Endangered Species Act in 1997, which concluded that "the federal government's responsibilities under the Endangered Species Act, recognizes the exercise of tribal rights, and ensures that Indian tribes do not bear a disproportionate burden for the conservation of listed species".
