= Ed Pastor =

American politician (1943–2018)

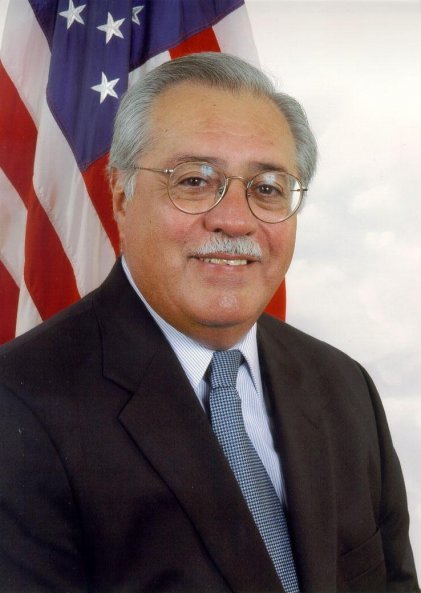
- Official portrait, 2007

Member of the U.S. House of Representatives from Arizona
- In office September 24, 1991 – January 3, 2015 (Note: Pastor's official service begins on the date of the special election, while he was not sworn in until October 3, 1991.)
- Preceded by: Mo Udall
- Succeeded by: Ruben Gallego
- Constituency: 2nd district (1991–2003); 4th district (2003–2013); 7th district (2013–2015)

Personal details
- Born: Edward Lopez Pastor; June 28, 1943 Claypool, Arizona, U.S.
- Died: November 27, 2018 (aged 75) Phoenix, Arizona, U.S.
- Party: Democratic
- Spouse: Verma Mendez (m. 1965)
- Education: Arizona State University, Tempe (BA, JD)
- Pastor's voice Pastor defends his earmark for the Achieving a College Education (ACE) Program. Recorded July 17, 2007

Edward Lopez Pastor (/pæˈstɔːr/; June 28, 1943 – November 27, 2018) was an American politician who served as a member of the United States House of Representatives from Arizona from 1991 to 2015. A member of the Democratic Party, he represented Arizona's 2nd congressional district from 1991 to 2003, its 4th district from 2003 to 2013, and its 7th district from 2013 to 2015, all of which were anchored in downtown Phoenix.

== Early life ==
Pastor was born in Claypool, Arizona, as the oldest of three children. After high school, he earned his Bachelor of Arts degree in chemistry from Arizona State University (ASU). He became a chemistry teacher at North High School in Phoenix and later went on to work as deputy director of the community service group Guadalupe Organization Inc.

After returning to ASU to earn a J.D. degree, he became an assistant to Arizona Governor Raúl Héctor Castro. In 1976, Pastor was elected to the Maricopa County Board of Supervisors, and he served three terms in that role as a county executive.

== U.S. House of Representatives ==
=== Elections ===
In 1991, Pastor entered a special election to succeed retiring 30-year incumbent Democrat Mo Udall in the 2nd District, which then comprised the southwestern part of Arizona, including half of Tucson and portions of southern Phoenix. Pastor won a narrow victory in the four-way Democratic primary, defeating his closest challenger, Tucson mayor Tom Volgy, by 1,800 votes. He was the only major candidate from the Phoenix share of the district.

He then won the special election a month later with 55 percent of the vote to become the first Latino to represent Arizona in Congress. He was reelected four times without substantive Republican opposition, never dropping below 60% of the vote.

Pastor's former territory was renumbered as the 7th District following the 2000 census, but his home in Phoenix was drawn into the newly created 4th District. Rather than move to the Phoenix portion of the reconfigured 7th, he opted to run in the 4th. The newly created district was heavily Democratic and majority-Latino, with Democrats having a nearly 2-to-1 advantage in registration, similar to his old district. He was reelected six times against nominal Republican opposition.

=== Tenure ===
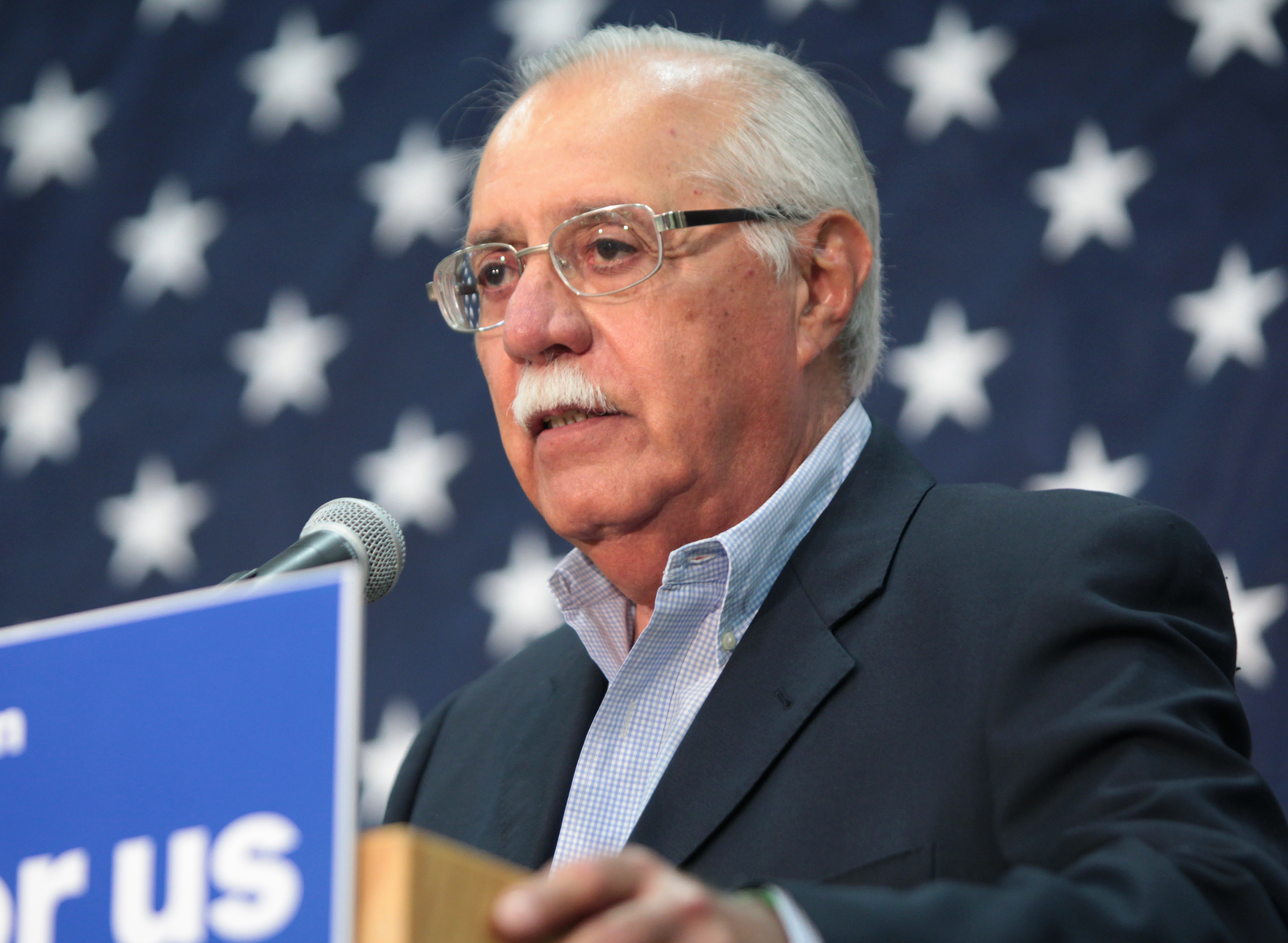
Ed Pastor introducing President Bill Clinton in Phoenix in March 2016.

Pastor was one of the nine Chief Deputy Whips for the Democratic Caucus. Following in Udall's footsteps, his voting record was decidedly liberal; for most of his tenure, he was the most liberal member of the Arizona congressional delegation. He was well-respected by members of both parties, and had a reputation for bipartisanship.

He was a founding member of the Congressional Progressive Caucus, was pro-choice, and in 2006 supported the interests of the Planned Parenthood 100 percent, according to their records. In 2006, NARAL Pro-Choice America-Endorsements endorsed Representative Pastor. He voted against the 2002 Iraq Resolution that started the Iraq War.

In 2011, Pastor voted against the National Right to Carry Reciprocity Act of 2011. He also voted against several bills that would encourage trade between countries such as Panama. Furthermore, he voted to encourage the display of "In God We Trust" in public buildings and schools.

In 2009–2010, Pastor was backed by the National Farmers Union. However, he was not supported by the National Council of Agricultural Employers.

Pastor was supported by the Defenders of Wildlife Action Fund, which works to protect native wildlife and wild areas.

Around the mid-1990s, Pastor was backed by the Americans for the Arts Action Fund. However, since then, their support has dwindled somewhat.

Pastor had a strong stance on civil rights regarding sexual orientation and race. For example, in 2007, he voted to prohibit job discrimination based on sexual orientation and, in 2006, he voted against defining marriage as one man-one woman. Finally, in 2004, he voted against a constitutional amendment that would ban same-sex marriage. In 2002, the ACLU rated Pastor at 93% for a pro-civil rights voting record.

In February 2014, Pastor announced that he would not seek reelection and would instead retire upon the completion of his term.

=== Committee assignments ===
- Committee on Appropriations
  - Subcommittee of Energy and Water Development
  - Subcommittee on Financial Services and General Government
  - Subcommittee on Transportation, Housing and Urban Development, and Related Agencies (Ranking Member)

=== Caucuses ===
- Congressional Progressive Caucus
- Congressional Hispanic Caucus
- International Conservation Caucus

== Legacy ==
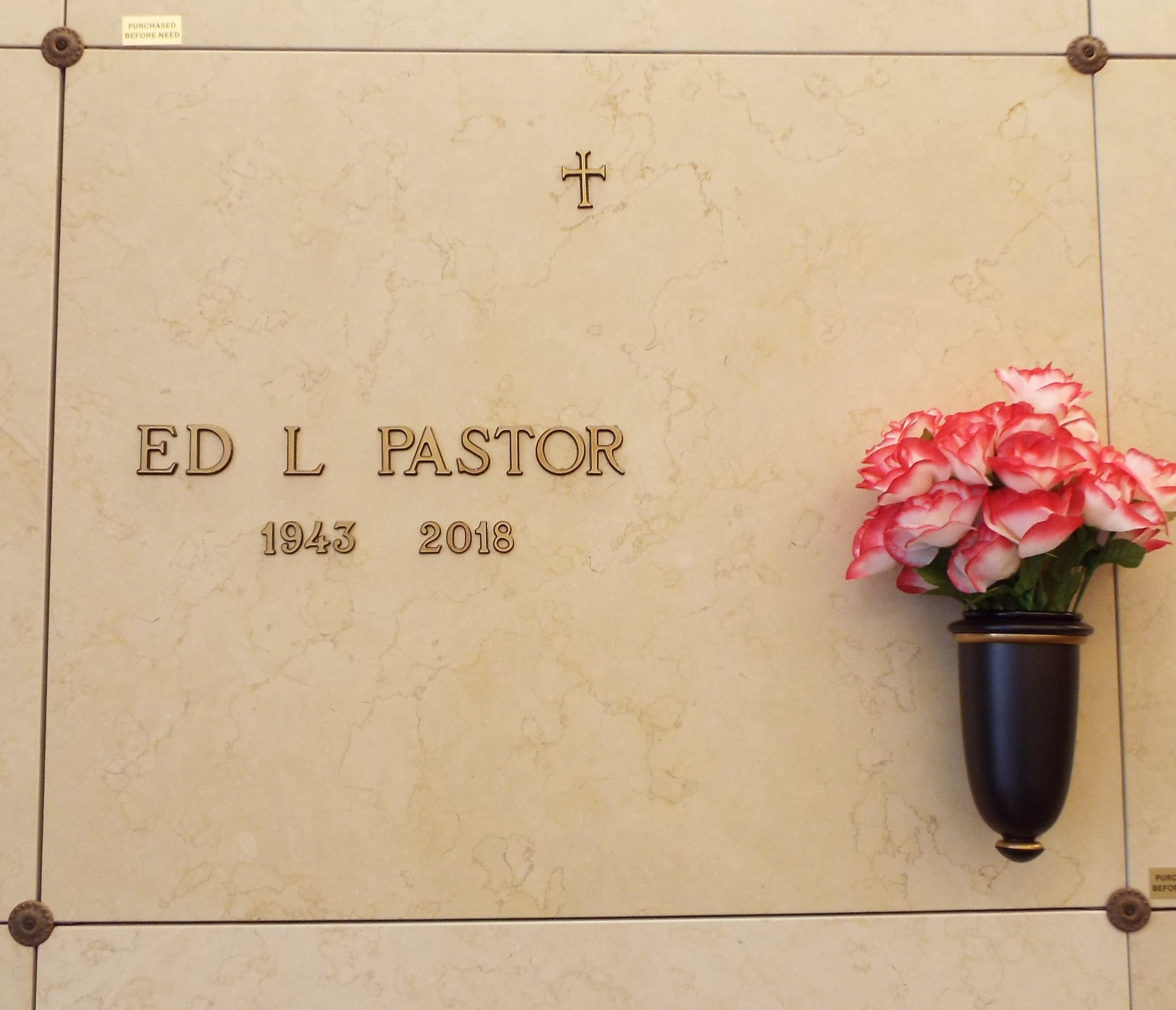
Crypt of Ed Pastor

Multiple schools, parks and other institutions have been established in his honor.

The Ed Pastor Center for Politics and Public Service was founded in 2015 as part of the College of Public Service & Community Solutions at Arizona State University. The Center serves as a dynamic, student-centric hub of activity that promotes, publicizes, and encourages political engagement and public service among ASU students and the broader community.

A section of Loop 202 in the Phoenix area was named in his honor.

Pastor has been credited with inspiring multiple generations of people dedicated to public service including Arizona State House Democratic Leader Charlene Fernandez.

== Personal life ==
Pastor was married to Verma Mendez for 53 years and had two daughters, Yvonne and Laura. He died on November 27, 2018, following a heart attack in Phoenix at the age of 75.

== Electoral history ==
Arizona's 2nd congressional district: Results 1991–2000
Year	Democratic	Votes	Pct	Republican	Votes	Pct	3rd Party	Party	Votes	Pct	3rd Party	Party	Votes	Pct
1991	Ed Pastor	32,289	55.54%	Pat Conner	25,814	44.40%	Bruce A. Friedemann	Independent	33	0.06%				
1992	Ed Pastor*	90,693	66.02%	Don Shooter	41,257	30.03%	Dan Detaranto	Libertarian	5,423	3.95%				
1994	Ed Pastor*	62,589	62.31%	Robert MacDonald	32,797	32.65%	James Bertrand	Libertarian	5,060	5.04%				
1996	Ed Pastor	81,982	65.01%	Jim Buster	38,786	30.76%	Alice Bangle	Libertarian	5,333	4.23%				
1998	Ed Pastor*	57,178	67.78%	Ed Barron	23,628	28.01%	Rick Duncan	Libertarian	2,646	3.14%	Gregory R. Schultz	Reform	911	1.08%
2000	Ed Pastor*	84,034	68.54%	Bill Barenholtz	32,990	26.91%	Geoffrey Weber	Libertarian	3,169	2.59%	Barbara Shelor	Natural Law	2,412	1.97%

- Write-in and minor candidate notes: In 1990, write-ins received 44 votes. In 1992, write-ins received 5 votes.

Arizona's 4th congressional district: Results 2002–2010
Year	Democratic	Votes	Pct	Republican	Votes	Pct	3rd Party	Party	Votes	Pct	3rd Party	Party	Votes	Pct
2002	Ed Pastor	44,517	67.38%	Jonathan Barnert	18,381	27.82%	Amy Gibbons	Libertarian	3,167	4.79%				
2004	Ed Pastor*	77,150	70.12%	Don Karg	28,238	25.67%	Gary Fallon	Libertarian	4,639	4.22%				
2006	Ed Pastor*	56,464	72.86%	Don Karg	18,627	23.57%	Ronald Harders	Libertarian	2,770	3.57%				
2008	Ed Pastor*	89,721	72.11%	Don Karg	26,435	21.25%	Joe Cobb	Libertarian	3,807	3.06%	Rebecca DeWitt	Green	4,644	3.59%
2010	Ed Pastor*	61,524	66.94%	Janet Contreras	25,300	27.53%	Joe Cobb	Libertarian	2,718	2.96%	Rebecca DeWitt	Green	2,365	2.57%

Arizona's 7th congressional district: Results 2012
Year	Democratic	Votes	Pct	Republican	Votes	Pct	3rd Party	Party	Votes	Pct
2012	Ed Pastor	104,489	81.74%				Joe Cobb	Libertarian	23,338	18.25%

== See also ==
- List of Hispanic and Latino Americans in the United States Congress

U.S. House of Representatives
Preceded by Mo Udall	Member of the U.S. House of Representatives from Arizona's 2nd congressional district 1991–2003	Succeeded by Trent Franks
Preceded by José E. Serrano	Chair of the Congressional Hispanic Caucus; 1995–1997	Succeeded by Xavier Becerra
Preceded by John Shadegg	Member of the U.S. House of Representatives from Arizona's 4th congressional district 2003–2013	Succeeded by Paul Gosar
Preceded by Raúl Grijalva	Member of the U.S. House of Representatives from Arizona's 7th congressional district 2013–2015	Succeeded by Ruben Gallego
