= 1994 United States House of Representatives elections in Arizona =

- November 8, 1994

All 6 Arizona seats to the United States House of Representatives
	Majority party	Minority party
Party	Republican	Democratic
Last election	3	3
Seats won	5	1
Seat change	▲2	▼2
Popular vote	652,831	521,345
Percentage	59.38%	37.26%
Swing	▲6.85%	▼4.07%

Republican
40–50%
50–60%
60–70%
70–80%
Democratic
60–70%

The 1994 congressional elections in Arizona were elections for Arizona's delegation to the United States House of Representatives, which occurred along with congressional elections nationwide on November 8, 1994. Arizona has six seats, as apportioned during the 1990 United States census. Republicans held five seats and Democrats held one seat afterward, compared to both parties having three seats each before the election.

== Overview ==
1994 United States House of Representatives elections in Arizona
Party	Votes	Percentage	Seats	+/–
Republican	652,831	59.38%	5	+2
Democratic	409,672	37.26%	1	-2
Libertarian	36,886	3.36%	0	-
Totals	1,099,389	100.00%	6	-
