= Arizona's congressional delegations =

Map of Arizona's nine congressional districts for the United States House of Representatives since 2022

Since Arizona became a U.S. state in 1912, it has sent congressional delegations to the United States Senate and United States House of Representatives, beginning with the 63rd United States Congress in 1913. Before becoming a state, the Arizona Territory elected a non-voting delegate at-large to Congress from 1864 to 1912. Each state elects two senators to serve for six years, and varying numbers of members of the House, depending on state population, to two-year terms. Arizona has sent nine members to the House in each delegation since the 2010 United States census.

A total of 60 people have served Arizona in the House and 15 have served Arizona in the Senate. The first woman to serve Arizona in the House was Isabella Greenway. Eight women have served Arizona in the House, including Kyrsten Sinema and Martha McSally, who also served Arizona in the Senate, the only women to do so.

The current deans, or longest-serving members, of the Arizona delegation are Republican Representatives David Schweikert of the 1st district and Paul Gosar of the 9th district, who have both served in the House since 2011. Carl Hayden was Arizona's longest-serving senator, and his 42 years as a senator is the eighth-longest tenure in American history.

== Current delegation ==
Current U.S. senators from Arizona
Arizona CPVI (2025): R+2	Class I senator	Class III senator
Arizona CPVI (2025): R+2	Ruben Gallego (Junior senator) (Phoenix)	Mark Kelly (Senior senator) (Tucson)
Party	Democratic	Democratic
Incumbent since	January 3, 2025	December 2, 2020

Arizona's current congressional delegation in the 119th Congress consists of its two senators, both Democrats, and its nine representatives, six Republicans and three Democrats.

As of 2025, the Cook Partisan Voting Index, a measure of how strongly partisan a state is, ranked Arizona's 1st, 2nd, 5th, 8th, and 9th districts as leaning Republican, and the 3rd, 4th, and 7th districts as leaning Democratic. They ranked the 6th district is ranked as even. As a state, Arizona is ranked as leaning Republican, with a score of R+2.

Current U.S. representatives from Arizona
District	Member (Residence)	Party	Incumbent since	CPVI (2025)	District map
1st	David Schweikert (Fountain Hills)	Republican	January 3, 2011	R+1	Map of Arizona's 1st congressional district
2nd	Eli Crane (Oro Valley)	Republican	January 3, 2023	R+7	Map of Arizona's 2nd congressional district
3rd	Yassamin Ansari (Phoenix)	Democratic	January 3, 2025	D+22	Map of Arizona's 3rd congressional district
4th	Greg Stanton (Phoenix)	Democratic	January 3, 2019	D+4	Map of Arizona's 4th congressional district
5th	Andy Biggs (Gilbert)	Republican	January 3, 2017	R+10	Map of Arizona's 5th congressional district
6th	Juan Ciscomani (Tucson)	Republican	January 3, 2023	EVEN	Map of Arizona's 6th congressional district
7th	Adelita Grijalva (Tucson)	Democratic	September 23, 2025	D+13	Map of Arizona's 7th congressional district
8th	Abraham Hamadeh (Phoenix)	Republican	January 3, 2025	R+8	Map of Arizona's 8th congressional district
9th	Paul Gosar (Bullhead City)	Republican	January 3, 2011	R+15	Map of Arizona's 9th congressional district

== United States Senate ==
Since it became a state in 1912, 14 people have served as a U.S. senator from Arizona. Of those, Martha McSally and Kyrsten Sinema have been the only women. Sinema is also the first openly bisexual member of Congress. Both senators Barry Goldwater and John McCain have been nominated as the Republican candidate for president, in 1964 and 2008 respectively.

Sometimes considered a swing state, elections in Arizona are considered critical for party control of the Senate. Senators are elected every six years depending on their class, with each senator serving a six-year term, and elections for senators occurring every two years, rotating through each class such that in each election, around one-third of the seats in the Senate are up for election. Arizona's senators are elected in classes I and III. Currently, Arizona is represented in the Senate by Ruben Gallego and Mark Kelly.

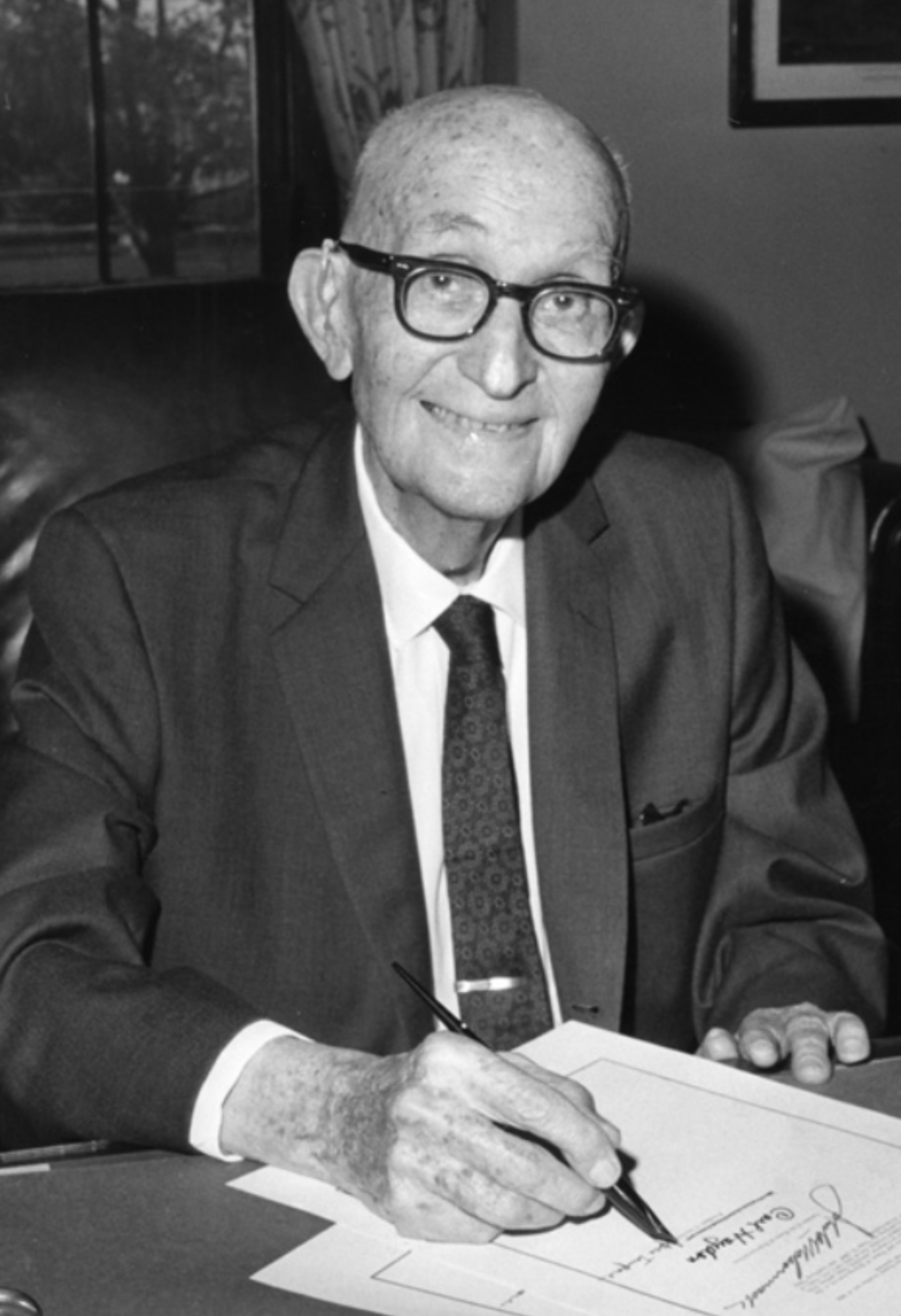
Carl Hayden, the longest-serving senator from Arizona, with a 56-year tenure

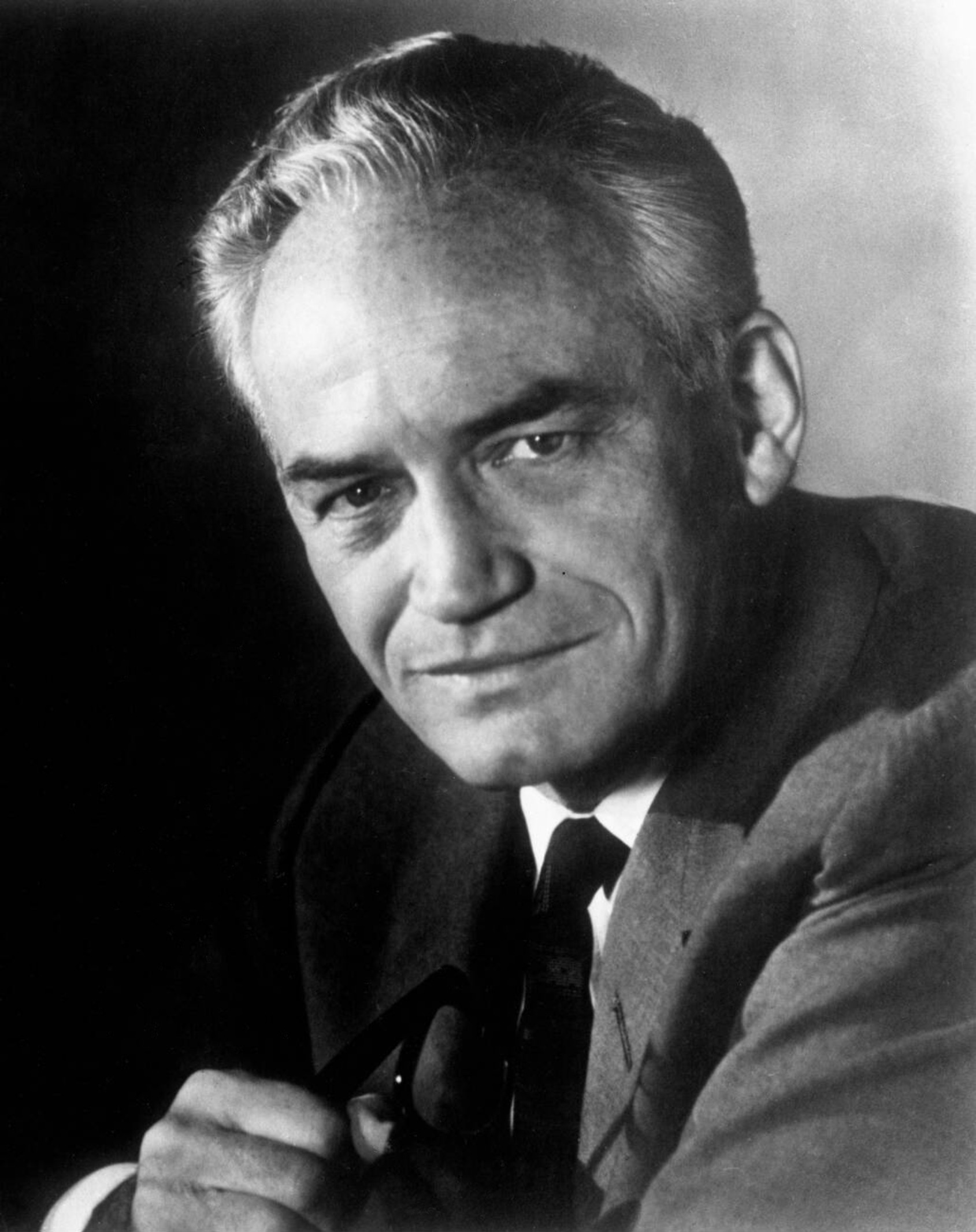
Barry Goldwater, Arizona senator who was the 1964 Republican presidential nominee

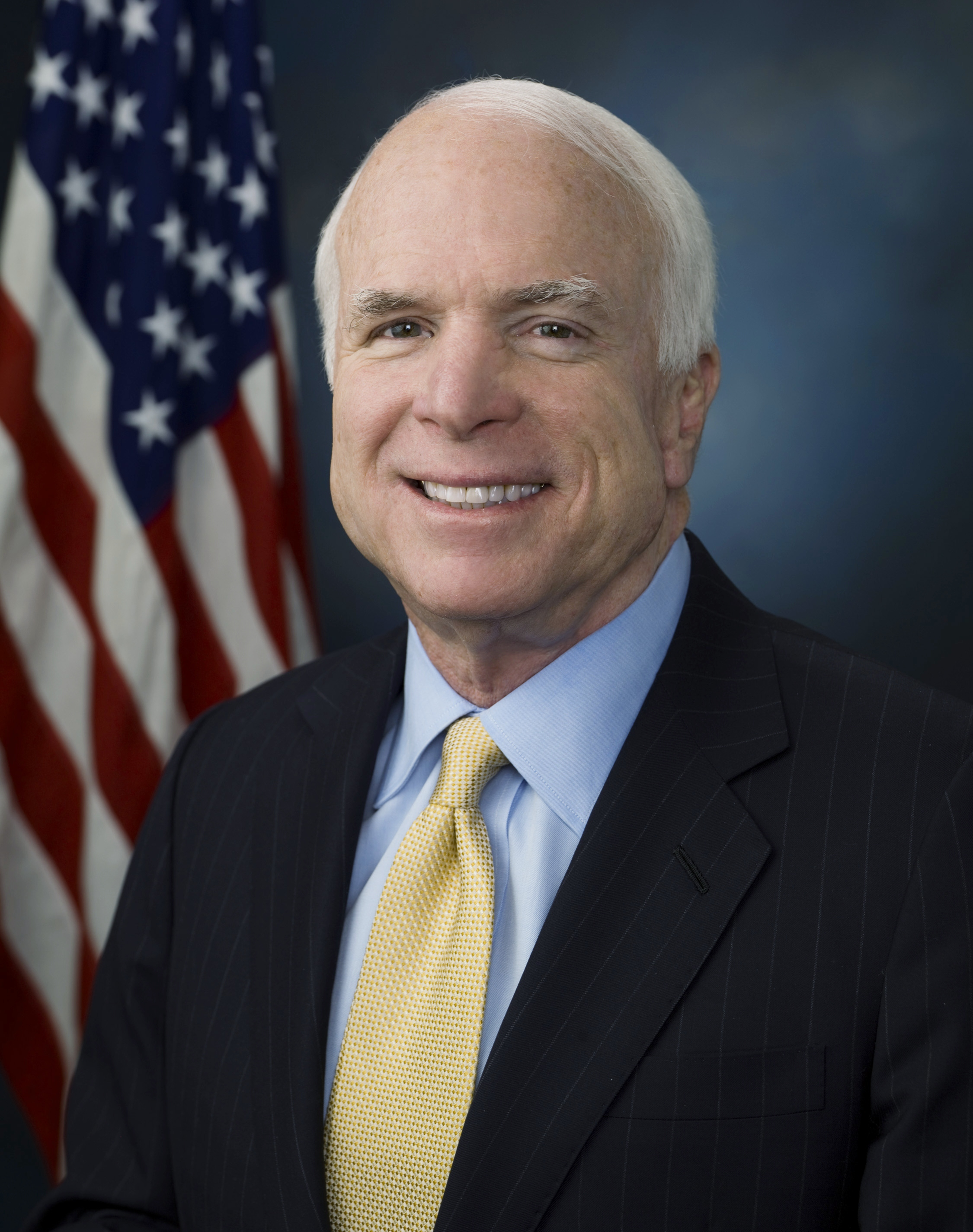
John McCain, Arizona senator who was the 2008 Republican presidential nominee

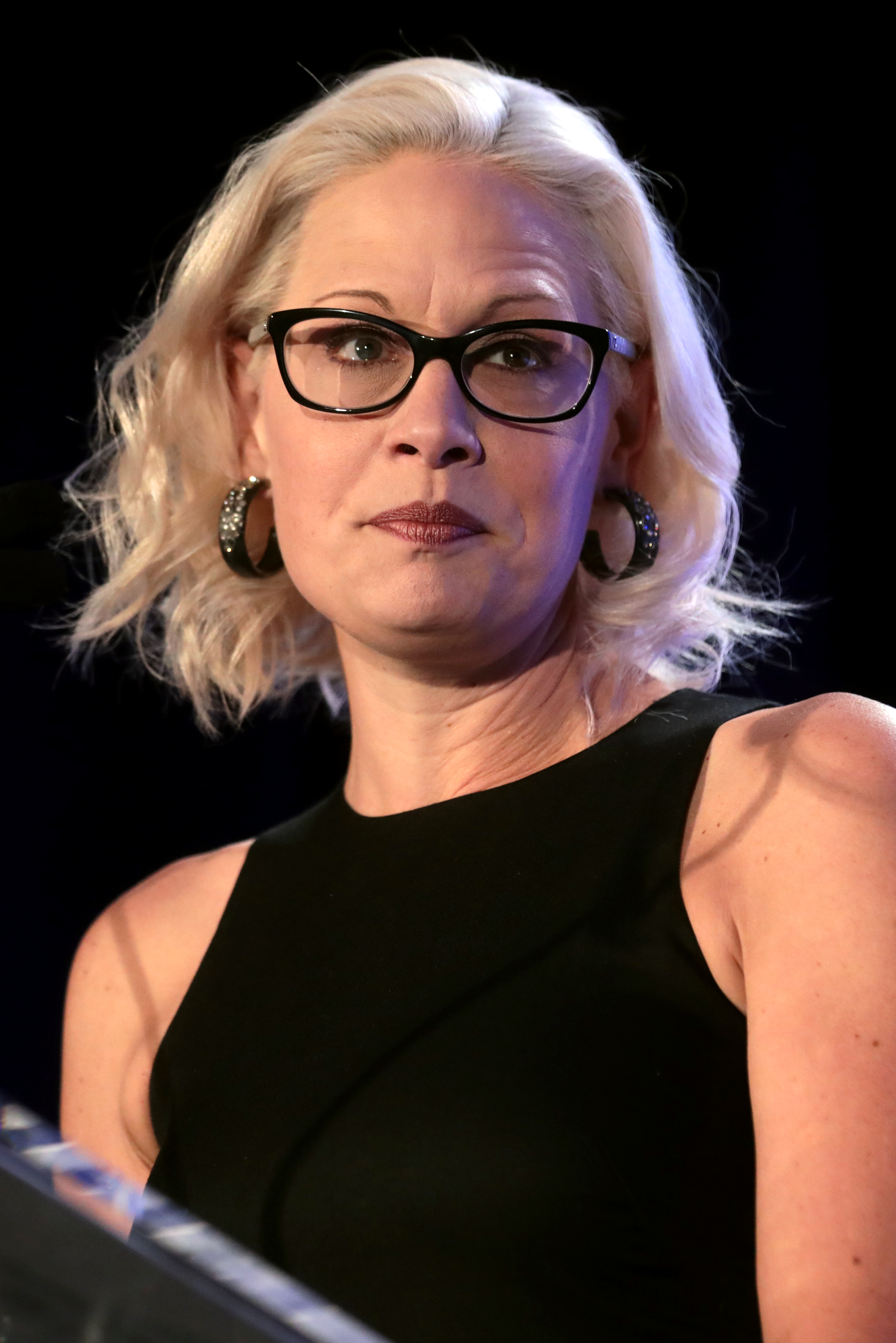
Kyrsten Sinema, Arizona senator and the first openly bisexual member of Congress

Democratic (D) Independent (I) Republican (R)

Senators from Arizona
Class I senator	Congress	Class III senator
Henry F. Ashurst (D)	62nd (1912–1913)	Marcus A. Smith (D)
Henry F. Ashurst (D)	63rd (1913–1915)	Marcus A. Smith (D)
Henry F. Ashurst (D)	64th (1915–1917)	Marcus A. Smith (D)
Henry F. Ashurst (D)	65th (1917–1919)	Marcus A. Smith (D)
Henry F. Ashurst (D)	66th (1919–1921)	Marcus A. Smith (D)
Henry F. Ashurst (D)	67th (1921–1923)	Ralph H. Cameron (R)
Henry F. Ashurst (D)	68th (1923–1925)	Ralph H. Cameron (R)
Henry F. Ashurst (D)	69th (1925–1927)	Ralph H. Cameron (R)
Henry F. Ashurst (D)	70th (1927–1929)	Carl Hayden (D)
Henry F. Ashurst (D)	71st (1929–1931)	Carl Hayden (D)
Henry F. Ashurst (D)	72nd (1931–1933)	Carl Hayden (D)
Henry F. Ashurst (D)	73rd (1933–1935)	Carl Hayden (D)
Henry F. Ashurst (D)	74th (1935–1937)	Carl Hayden (D)
Henry F. Ashurst (D)	75th (1937–1939)	Carl Hayden (D)
Henry F. Ashurst (D)	76th (1939–1941)	Carl Hayden (D)
Ernest McFarland (D)	77th (1941–1943)	Carl Hayden (D)
Ernest McFarland (D)	78th (1943–1945)	Carl Hayden (D)
Ernest McFarland (D)	79th (1945–1947)	Carl Hayden (D)
Ernest McFarland (D)	80th (1947–1949)	Carl Hayden (D)
Ernest McFarland (D)	81st (1949–1951)	Carl Hayden (D)
Ernest McFarland (D)	82nd (1951–1953)	Carl Hayden (D)
Barry Goldwater (R)	83rd (1953–1955)	Carl Hayden (D)
Barry Goldwater (R)	84th (1955–1957)	Carl Hayden (D)
Barry Goldwater (R)	85th (1957–1959)	Carl Hayden (D)
Barry Goldwater (R)	86th (1959–1961)	Carl Hayden (D)
Barry Goldwater (R)	87th (1961–1963)	Carl Hayden (D)
Barry Goldwater (R)	88th (1963–1965)	Carl Hayden (D)
Paul Fannin (R)	89th (1965–1967)	Carl Hayden (D)
Paul Fannin (R)	90th (1967–1969)	Carl Hayden (D)
Paul Fannin (R)	91st (1969–1971)	Barry Goldwater (R)
Paul Fannin (R)	92nd (1971–1973)	Barry Goldwater (R)
Paul Fannin (R)	93rd (1973–1975)	Barry Goldwater (R)
Paul Fannin (R)	94th (1975–1977)	Barry Goldwater (R)
Dennis DeConcini (D)	95th (1977–1979)	Barry Goldwater (R)
Dennis DeConcini (D)	96th (1979–1981)	Barry Goldwater (R)
Dennis DeConcini (D)	97th (1981–1983)	Barry Goldwater (R)
Dennis DeConcini (D)	98th (1983–1985)	Barry Goldwater (R)
Dennis DeConcini (D)	99th (1985–1987)	Barry Goldwater (R)
Dennis DeConcini (D)	100th (1987–1989)	John McCain (R) (Note: Senator McCain died in office.)
Dennis DeConcini (D)	101st (1989–1991)	John McCain (R)
Dennis DeConcini (D)	102nd (1991–1993)	John McCain (R)
Dennis DeConcini (D)	103rd (1993–1995)	John McCain (R)
Jon Kyl (R)	104th (1995–1997)	John McCain (R)
Jon Kyl (R)	105th (1997–1999)	John McCain (R)
Jon Kyl (R)	106th (1999–2001)	John McCain (R)
Jon Kyl (R)	107th (2001–2003)	John McCain (R)
Jon Kyl (R)	108th (2003–2005)	John McCain (R)
Jon Kyl (R)	109th (2005–2007)	John McCain (R)
Jon Kyl (R)	110th (2007–2009)	John McCain (R)
Jon Kyl (R)	111th (2009–2011)	John McCain (R)
Jon Kyl (R)	112th (2011–2013)	John McCain (R)
Jeff Flake (R)	113th (2013–2015)	John McCain (R)
Jeff Flake (R)	114th (2015–2017)	John McCain (R)
Jeff Flake (R)	115th (2017–2019)	John McCain (R)
Jeff Flake (R)	115th (2017–2019)	Jon Kyl (R) (Note: Senator Kyl was appointed by governor Doug Ducey to fill the seat of John McCain after McCain's death in office. Kyl resigned at the end of 2018.)
Kyrsten Sinema (D)	116th (2019–2021)	Martha McSally (R)
Kyrsten Sinema (D)	116th (2019–2021)	Mark Kelly (D)
Kyrsten Sinema (D)	117th (2021–2023)	Mark Kelly (D)
Kyrsten Sinema (I) (Note: Senator Sinema left the Democratic Party to become an independent in 2022.)	117th (2021–2023)	Mark Kelly (D)
Kyrsten Sinema (I)	118th (2023–2025)	Mark Kelly (D)
Ruben Gallego (D)	119th (2025–2027)	Mark Kelly (D)
Ruben Gallego (D)	120th (2027–2029)	Mark Kelly (D)

== United States House of Representatives ==
Arizona has had numerous notable representatives in Congress, including Stewart Udall, who resigned to serve as the Secretary of the Interior in the Kennedy administration, his brother, Mo Udall, who came in second in the 1976 Democratic Party presidential primaries, and John Jacob Rhodes, who served as House Minority Leader for the Republican Party during the Watergate scandal.

Each district uses a popular vote to elect a member of Arizona's delegation in the House of Representatives. Districts are redrawn every ten years, after data from the US Census is collected. From 1863 to 1912, Arizona sent a non-voting delegate to the House of Representatives; when it became a state in 1912, it had one seat in the House. Since then, its representation in the House has grown along with its population. Since 2013, Arizona has had nine congressional districts drawn according to the results of the 2010 United States census.

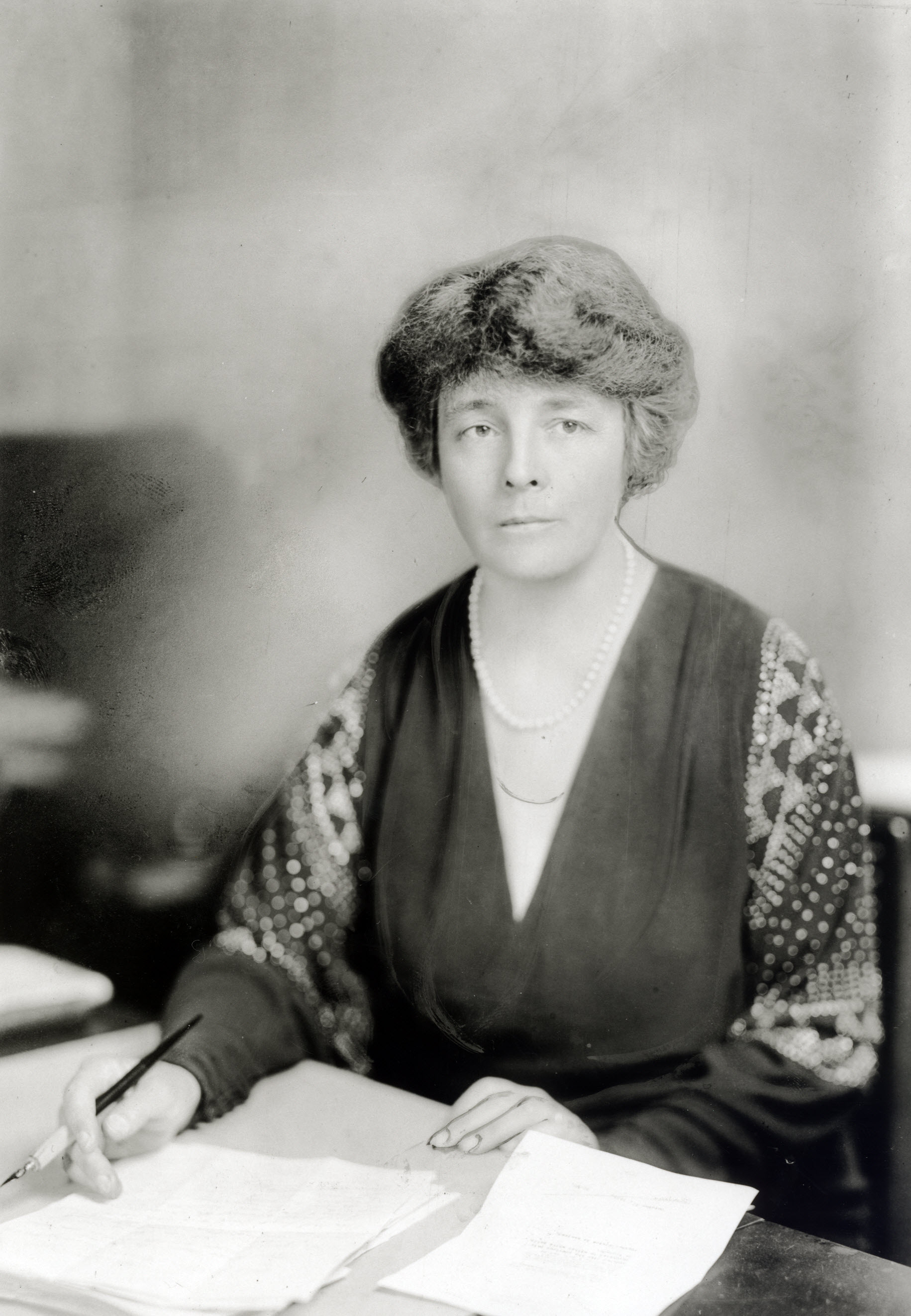
Isabella Greenway, the first female member of the House from Arizona

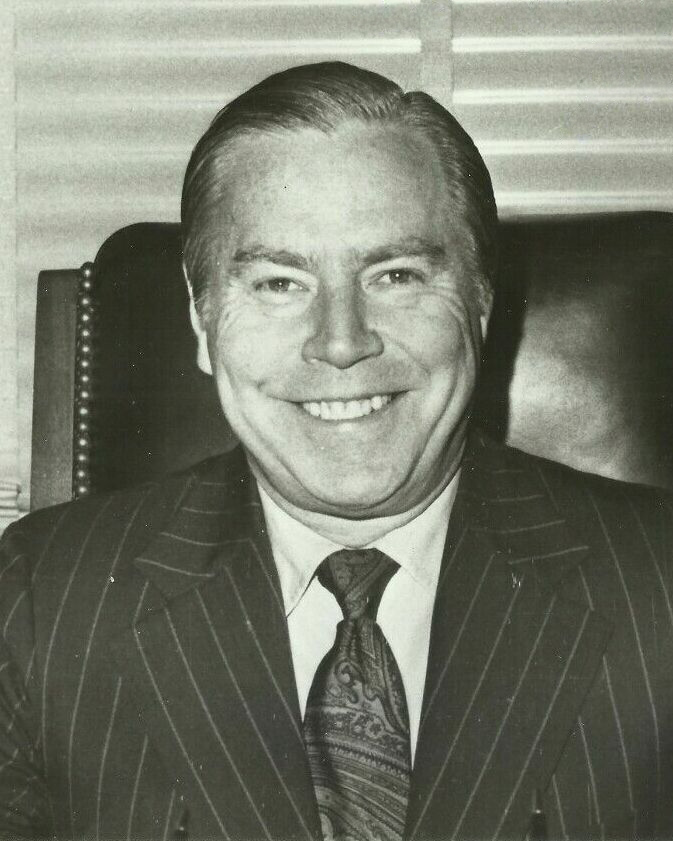
John Jacob Rhodes, representative from Arizona who served as House Minority Leader for the Republican Party during the Watergate scandal

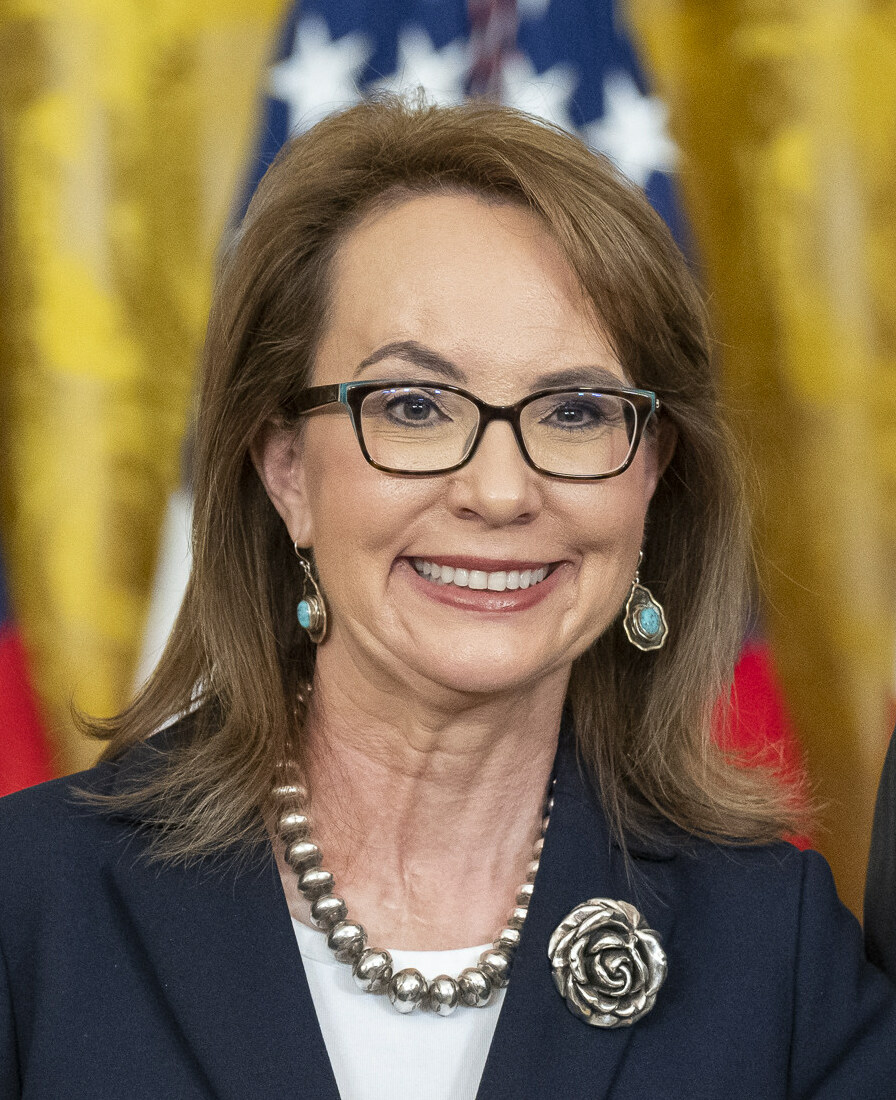
Gabby Giffords, representative from Arizona who received the Presidential Medal of Freedom for her service in Congress and subsequent gun control advocacy after an assassination attempt ended her career in Congress

=== 1863–1912: 1 non-voting delegate ===
Starting on December 5, 1864, Arizona Territory sent a non-voting delegate to the House.

Democratic (D) Independent (I) Republican (R) Unionist (U)

Delegates to the House of Representatives from Arizona from 1863 to 1912
Congress	Delegate from Territory's at-large district
38th (1863–1865)	Charles Debrille Poston (R)
39th (1865–1867)	John N. Goodwin (R)
40th (1867–1869)	Coles Bashford (I)
41st (1869–1871)	Richard C. McCormick (U)
42nd (1871–1873)	Richard C. McCormick (U)
43rd (1873–1875)	Richard C. McCormick (U)
44th (1875–1877)	Hiram Sanford Stevens (D)
45th (1877–1879)	Hiram Sanford Stevens (D)
46th (1879–1881)	John G. Campbell (D)
47th (1881–1883)	G. H. Oury (D)
48th (1883–1885)	G. H. Oury (D)
49th (1885–1887)	Curtis Coe Bean (R)
50th (1887–1889)	Marcus A. Smith (D)
51st (1889–1891)	Marcus A. Smith (D)
52nd (1891–1893)	Marcus A. Smith (D)
53rd (1893–1895)	Marcus A. Smith (D)
54th (1895–1897)	Oakes Murphy (R)
55th (1897–1899)	Marcus A. Smith (D)
56th (1899–1901)	John Frank Wilson (D)
57th (1901–1903)	Marcus A. Smith (D)
58th (1903–1905)	John Frank Wilson (D)
59th (1905–1907)	Marcus A. Smith (D)
60th (1907–1909)	Marcus A. Smith (D)
61st (1909–1911)	Ralph H. Cameron (R)
62nd (1911–1912)	Ralph H. Cameron (R)

=== 1912–1943: 1 seat ===
Following statehood on February 14, 1912, Arizona had one seat in the House.

Democratic (D)

Members of the House of Representatives from Arizona from 1912 to 1943
Congress	At-large district
62nd (1912–1913)	Carl Hayden (D)
63rd (1913–1915)	Carl Hayden (D)
64th (1915–1917)	Carl Hayden (D)
65th (1917–1919)	Carl Hayden (D)
66th (1919–1921)	Carl Hayden (D)
67th (1921–1923)	Carl Hayden (D)
68th (1923–1925)	Carl Hayden (D)
69th (1925–1927)	Carl Hayden (D)
70th (1927–1929)	Lewis Douglas (D) (Note: Representative Douglas resigned to become the Director of the Bureau of the Budget.)
71st (1929–1931)	Lewis Douglas (D)
72nd (1931–1933)	Lewis Douglas (D)
73rd (1933–1935)	Isabella Greenway (D)
74th (1935–1937)	Isabella Greenway (D)
75th (1937–1939)	John R. Murdock (D)
76th (1939–1941)	John R. Murdock (D)
77th (1941–1943)	John R. Murdock (D)

=== 1943–1963: 2 seats ===
Following the 1940 census, Arizona was apportioned two seats. For six years, the seats were elected statewide on a general ticket. In 1949, districts were used.

Democratic (D) Republican (R)

Members of the House of Representatives from Arizona from 1943 to 1963
Congress	2 seats elected on a general ticket	
Congress	1st seat	2nd seat
78th (1943–1945)	John R. Murdock (D)	Richard F. Harless (D)
79th (1945–1947)	John R. Murdock (D)	Richard F. Harless (D)
80th (1947–1949)	John R. Murdock (D)	Richard F. Harless (D)
Congress	1st district	2nd district
81st (1949–1951)	John R. Murdock (D)	Harold Patten (D)
82nd (1951–1953)	John R. Murdock (D)	Harold Patten (D)
83rd (1953–1955)	John Jacob; Rhodes (R)	Harold Patten (D)
84th (1955–1957)	John Jacob; Rhodes (R)	Stewart Udall (D) (Note: Representative Stewart Udall resigned to become the Secretary of the Interior in the Kennedy cabinet.)
85th (1957–1959)	John Jacob; Rhodes (R)	Stewart Udall (D)
86th (1959–1961)	John Jacob; Rhodes (R)	Stewart Udall (D)
87th (1961–1963)	John Jacob; Rhodes (R)	Stewart Udall (D)
87th (1961–1963)	John Jacob; Rhodes (R)	Mo Udall (D)

=== 1963–1973: 3 seats ===
Following the 1960 census, Arizona was apportioned three seats.

Democratic (D) Republican (R)

Members of the House of Representatives from Arizona from 1963 to 1973
Congress	District		
Congress	1st	2nd	3rd
88th (1963–1965)	John Jacob; Rhodes (R)	Mo Udall (D)	George F. Senner Jr. (D)
89th (1965–1967)	John Jacob; Rhodes (R)	Mo Udall (D)	George F. Senner Jr. (D)
90th (1967–1969)	John Jacob; Rhodes (R)	Mo Udall (D)	Sam Steiger (R)
91st (1969–1971)	John Jacob; Rhodes (R)	Mo Udall (D)	Sam Steiger (R)
92nd (1971–1973)	John Jacob; Rhodes (R)	Mo Udall (D)	Sam Steiger (R)

=== 1973–1983: 4 seats ===
Following the 1970 census, Arizona was apportioned four seats.

Democratic (D) Republican (R)

Members of the House of Representatives from Arizona from 1973 to 1983
Congress	District			
Congress	1st	2nd	3rd	4th
93rd (1973–1975)	John Jacob; Rhodes (R)	Mo Udall (D)	Sam Steiger (R)	John; Conlan (R)
94th (1975–1977)	John Jacob; Rhodes (R)	Mo Udall (D)	Sam Steiger (R)	John; Conlan (R)
95th (1977–1979)	John Jacob; Rhodes (R)	Mo Udall (D)	Bob Stump (D)	Eldon Rudd (R)
96th (1979–1981)	John Jacob; Rhodes (R)	Mo Udall (D)	Bob Stump (D)	Eldon Rudd (R)
97th (1981–1983)	John Jacob; Rhodes (R)	Mo Udall (D)	Bob Stump (D)	Eldon Rudd (R)
97th (1981–1983)	John Jacob; Rhodes (R)	Mo Udall (D)	Bob Stump (R)	Eldon Rudd (R)

=== 1983–1993: 5 seats ===
Following the 1980 census, Arizona was apportioned five seats.

Democratic (D) Republican (R)

Members of the House of Representatives from Arizona from 1983 to 1993
Congress	District				
Congress	1st	2nd	3rd	4th	5th
98th (1983–1985)	John McCain (R)	Mo Udall (D) (Note: Representative Mo Udall resigned due to the effects of Parkinson's disease.)	Bob Stump (R)	Eldon Rudd (R)	Jim McNulty (D)
99th (1985–1987)	John McCain (R)	Mo Udall (D)	Bob Stump (R)	Eldon Rudd (R)	Jim Kolbe (R)
100th (1987–1989)	Jay Rhodes (R)	Mo Udall (D)	Bob Stump (R)	Jon Kyl (R)	Jim Kolbe (R)
101st (1989–1991)	Jay Rhodes (R)	Mo Udall (D)	Bob Stump (R)	Jon Kyl (R)	Jim Kolbe (R)
102nd (1991–1993)	Jay Rhodes (R)	Mo Udall (D)	Bob Stump (R)	Jon Kyl (R)	Jim Kolbe (R)
102nd (1991–1993)	Jay Rhodes (R)	Ed Pastor (D)	Bob Stump (R)	Jon Kyl (R)	Jim Kolbe (R)

=== 1993–2003: 6 seats ===
Following the 1990 census, Arizona was apportioned six seats.

Democratic (D) Republican (R)

Members of the House of Representatives from Arizona from 1993 to 2003
Congress	District					
Congress	1st	2nd	3rd	4th	5th	6th
103rd (1993–1995)	Sam Coppersmith (D)	Ed; Pastor (D)	Bob; Stump (R)	Jon Kyl (R)	Jim; Kolbe (R)	Karan English (D)
104th (1995–1997)	Matt Salmon (R)	Ed; Pastor (D)	Bob; Stump (R)	John; Shadegg (R)	Jim; Kolbe (R)	J. D. Hayworth (R)
105th (1997–1999)	Matt Salmon (R)	Ed; Pastor (D)	Bob; Stump (R)	John; Shadegg (R)	Jim; Kolbe (R)	J. D. Hayworth (R)
106th (1999–2001)	Matt Salmon (R)	Ed; Pastor (D)	Bob; Stump (R)	John; Shadegg (R)	Jim; Kolbe (R)	J. D. Hayworth (R)
107th (2001–2003)	Jeff Flake (R)	Ed; Pastor (D)	Bob; Stump (R)	John; Shadegg (R)	Jim; Kolbe (R)	J. D. Hayworth (R)

=== 2003–2013: 8 seats ===
Following the 2000 census, Arizona was apportioned eight seats.

Democratic (D) Republican (R)

Members of the House of Representatives from Arizona from 2003 to 2013
Congress	District							
Congress	1st	2nd	3rd	4th	5th	6th	7th	8th
108th (2003–2005)	Rick Renzi (R)	Trent; Franks (R)	John; Shadegg (R)	Ed; Pastor (D)	J. D. Hayworth (R)	Jeff; Flake (R)	Raúl; Grijalva (D)	Jim Kolbe (R)
109th (2005–2007)	Rick Renzi (R)	Trent; Franks (R)	John; Shadegg (R)	Ed; Pastor (D)	J. D. Hayworth (R)	Jeff; Flake (R)	Raúl; Grijalva (D)	Jim Kolbe (R)
110th (2007–2009)	Rick Renzi (R)	Trent; Franks (R)	John; Shadegg (R)	Ed; Pastor (D)	Harry Mitchell (D)	Jeff; Flake (R)	Raúl; Grijalva (D)	Gabby; Giffords (D) (Note: Representative Giffords resigned to recover from the assassination attempt against her in the 2011 Tucson shooting.)
111th (2009–2011)	Ann Kirkpatrick (D)	Trent; Franks (R)	John; Shadegg (R)	Ed; Pastor (D)	Harry Mitchell (D)	Jeff; Flake (R)	Raúl; Grijalva (D)	Gabby; Giffords (D)
112th (2011–2013)	Paul Gosar (R)	Trent; Franks (R)	Ben Quayle (R)	Ed; Pastor (D)	David Schweikert (R)	Jeff; Flake (R)	Raúl; Grijalva (D)	Gabby; Giffords (D)
112th (2011–2013)	Paul Gosar (R)	Trent; Franks (R)	Ben Quayle (R)	Ed; Pastor (D)	David Schweikert (R)	Jeff; Flake (R)	Raúl; Grijalva (D)	Ron Barber (D)

=== 2013–present: 9 seats ===
Since the 2010 census, Arizona has been apportioned nine seats.

Democratic (D) Republican (R)

Members of the House of Representatives from Arizona from 2013 to present
Congress	District								
Congress	1st	2nd	3rd	4th	5th	6th	7th	8th	9th
113th (2013–2015)	Ann; Kirkpatrick (D)	Ron Barber (D)	Raúl; Grijalva (D)	Paul; Gosar (R)	Matt; Salmon (R)	David; Schweikert (R)	Ed Pastor (D)	Trent; Franks (R) (Note: Representative Franks resigned from the House after a House Ethics Committee investigation was opened into allegations against him for sexual assault.)	Kyrsten; Sinema (D)
114th (2015–2017)	Ann; Kirkpatrick (D)	Martha; McSally (R)	Raúl; Grijalva (D)	Paul; Gosar (R)	Matt; Salmon (R)	David; Schweikert (R)	Ruben; Gallego (D)	Trent; Franks (R)	Kyrsten; Sinema (D)
115th (2017–2019)	Tom; O'Halleran (D)	Martha; McSally (R)	Raúl; Grijalva (D)	Paul; Gosar (R)	Andy; Biggs (R)	David; Schweikert (R)	Ruben; Gallego (D)	Trent; Franks (R)	Kyrsten; Sinema (D)
115th (2017–2019)	Tom; O'Halleran (D)	Martha; McSally (R)	Raúl; Grijalva (D)	Paul; Gosar (R)	Andy; Biggs (R)	David; Schweikert (R)	Ruben; Gallego (D)	Debbie; Lesko (R)	Kyrsten; Sinema (D)
116th (2019–2021)	Tom; O'Halleran (D)	Ann; Kirkpatrick (D)	Raúl; Grijalva (D)	Paul; Gosar (R)	Andy; Biggs (R)	David; Schweikert (R)	Ruben; Gallego (D)	Debbie; Lesko (R)	Greg; Stanton (D)
117th (2021–2023)	Tom; O'Halleran (D)	Ann; Kirkpatrick (D)	Raúl; Grijalva (D)	Paul; Gosar (R)	Andy; Biggs (R)	David; Schweikert (R)	Ruben; Gallego (D)	Debbie; Lesko (R)	Greg; Stanton (D)
118th (2023–2025)	David; Schweikert (R)	Eli Crane (R)	Ruben; Gallego (D)	Greg; Stanton (D)	Andy; Biggs (R)	Juan; Ciscomani (R)	Raúl; Grijalva (D)	Debbie; Lesko (R)	Paul; Gosar (R)
119th (2025–2027)	David; Schweikert (R)	Eli Crane (R)	Yassamin; Ansari (D)	Greg; Stanton (D)	Andy; Biggs (R)	Juan; Ciscomani (R)	Raúl; Grijalva (D)	Abraham; Hamadeh (R)	Paul; Gosar (R)
119th (2025–2027)	David; Schweikert (R)	Eli Crane (R)	Yassamin; Ansari (D)	Greg; Stanton (D)	Andy; Biggs (R)	Juan; Ciscomani (R)	Adelita; Grijalva (D)	Abraham; Hamadeh (R)	Paul; Gosar (R)
120th (2027–2029)	Amish; Shah (D)	Eli Crane (R)	Yassamin; Ansari (D)	Greg; Stanton (D)	Mark; Lamb (R)	JoAnna; Mendoza (D)	Adelita; Grijalva (D)	Abraham; Hamadeh (R)	Paul; Gosar (R)

== See also ==
- List of United States congressional districts
- Arizona's congressional districts
- Political party strength in Arizona
