= Marcus A. Smith =

US Senator from Arizona (1851–1924)

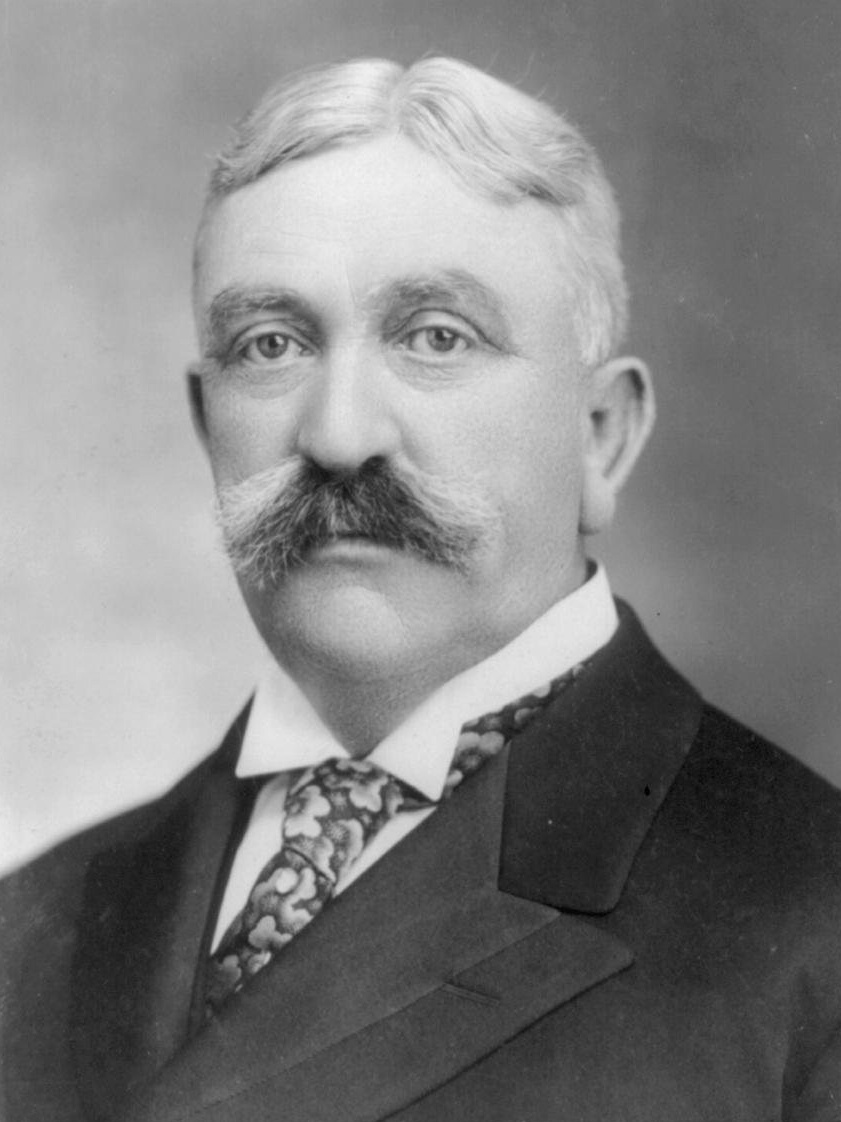
- Smith in 1908

United States Senator from Arizona
- In office March 27, 1912 – March 3, 1921
- Preceded by: Seat established
- Succeeded by: Ralph H. Cameron

Delegate to the U.S. House of Representatives from Arizona Territory
- In office March 4, 1905 – March 3, 1909
- Preceded by: John Frank Wilson
- Succeeded by: Ralph H. Cameron
- In office March 4, 1901 – March 3, 1903
- Preceded by: John Frank Wilson
- Succeeded by: John Frank Wilson
- In office March 4, 1897 – March 3, 1899
- Preceded by: Nathan O. Murphy
- Succeeded by: John Frank Wilson
- In office March 4, 1887 – March 3, 1895
- Preceded by: Curtis C. Bean
- Succeeded by: Nathan O. Murphy

Personal details
- Born: Marcus Aurelius Smith; January 24, 1851 Cynthiana, Kentucky, U.S.
- Died: April 7, 1924 (aged 73) Washington, D.C., U.S.
- Party: Democratic
- Spouse: Elizabeth Rathbone (Note: Some sources cite Mrs. Smith's maiden name as "Rathman".)
- Education: Kentucky University

Marcus Aurelius Smith (January 24, 1851 (Note: Some sources list Smith's year of birth as 1852.) – April 7, 1924) was an American attorney and politician who served eight terms as Arizona territorial delegate to Congress and as one of the first two senators from Arizona. As a delegate, he was a leader in the effort to gain statehood for Arizona. His non-voting status, however, minimized his influence with only 35 of the 277 bills he introduced into the House of Representatives being signed into law. Lack of a voice in the United States Senate further weakened his efforts as he managed to get Arizona statehood bills passed by the House only to see the legislation blocked in the Senate. Beyond his efforts for statehood, Smith worked to have government buildings constructed and to provide relief to his constituents affected by either man-made or natural misfortunes. His efforts to provide relief to the citizens of Arizona did not extend to the indigenous population, for whom Smith expressed great animosity.

Smith was a dedicated conservative for most of his political career. This changed following his electoral defeat in 1908. As Smith campaigned to become one of Arizona's first two senators he became a progressive. In this new role, he was a firm supporter of Woodrow Wilson's New Freedom initiatives.

== Background ==
Smith was born on January 24, 1851, near Cynthiana, Kentucky, as the youngest of seven sons to Frederick Chinn and Agnes Ball (Chinn) Smith. His family were successful farmers who also raised livestock. He and his brothers were educated at a combination of public and private schools. In 1868 Smith enrolled at Kentucky University (now Transylvania University) where he initially studied classics. After his graduation in 1872 he enrolled in the university's law school. Smith graduated from law school at the top of his class in 1876.

Following his graduation, Smith worked for the Lexington legal firm of Huston & Mulligan. In 1877 he was admitted to the Kentucky bar. The same year saw him elected to a two-year term as prosecuting attorney for Lexington. After completing his term of office, Smith moved to San Francisco, California, where with the assistance of his cousin, newspaperman William T. Coleman, he established a legal practice. While in California he met and married Elizabeth Rathbone. The marriage produced no children.

== Tombstone ==
From California, Smith moved to the boomtown of Tombstone, Arizona Territory. (Note: Source documents differ on the date of Smith's move to Arizona. While most sources indicate he made the move sometime during 1880, it is possible he arrived sometime before January 2, 1880. The earliest confirmed date for his presence in Cochise County is May 1881.) There he became one of the first attorneys in Cochise County when Judge William Henry Stilwell admitted him to the territorial bar on May 9, 1881. He established a law practice with Ben Goodrich and quickly gained a reputation with his lively courtroom style. An example of this came when a donkey located outside a courtroom window began braying while opposing counsel was making a long speech. Smith used the resulting laughter as reason to object to "two attorneys arguing a case in the court simultaneously." In addition to his legal practice, Smith acquired an interest in a local mining operation during December 1881. To this initial stake he added three other mines during the next two years and gained a reputation as an up-and-coming mine owner. During his leisure time, Smith enjoyed fishing the San Pedro River, hunting, or spending time at the local saloons.

Smith became active in Democratic Party politics during Cochise County's "cowboy" troubles. When the U.S. Federal Government threatened to impose martial law, Smith became a leader of the plan's opposition. Believing that public safety was as established in the county as in other parts of the United States, he became a candidate for district attorney in September 1882. He won his race and served a single term beginning in 1883. While he was in office he was noted for the fairness and efficiency he displayed in his duties, always presenting well prepared and researched cases. After leaving office in 1885 he returned to his private legal practice.

== Territorial Delegate ==
The 1886 Democratic territorial convention nominated Smith for the office of Territorial Delegate over longer serving possibilities such as Peter R. Brady and Albert C. Baker. The same convention created a party platform calling for free silver, territorial home rule, opposition to Chinese immigration, granting territorial delegates the right to vote, and support of the Cleveland administration. Smith's opponent was the incumbent, Curtis C. Bean. During the campaign, Smith and his supporters focused on two issues. In the 1884 campaign, Bean promised to resign if a Democratic president was elected that year. He failed to keep the promise after Grover Cleveland was elected president. Second, when the Tres Alamos land claim in Cochise County was presented to the U.S. Congress for final confirmation, Bean had taken no action even though ratification of the claim had resulted in 300 settlers being displaced. Smith in turn had no political record to defend and won the November 2, 1886, election.

With the first session of the 50th United States Congress not beginning till December 1887, Smith remained in Arizona practicing law until August 1887. This time period also saw him become a director of Tombstone's Grand Central Mining Company. When Congress finally convened, Smith was assigned to the Committees on Mines and Mining and Private Land Claims. He additionally served as a member of the Special Committee on the Centennial Celebration of the Inauguration of the First President.

During his first term, Smith introduced 41 bills. The subjects of these bills included a request to grant Arizona Territory another justice for the Territorial Supreme Court, authorization for Maricopa county to issue bonds, twenty bills providing financial reimbursement for losses suffered due to Civil War actions and Indian depredations, and six bills that would grant right of way to railroads and water companies to cross Indian reservations. Smith's first speech from the House floor came on March 31, 1888, when he spoke against creation of a Court of Private Land Claims. The court was intended to streamline the process by which Spanish and Mexican land grants were recognized by the United States government. In the wake of the troubles caused by James Addison Reavis and his Peralta land grant fraud, Smith argued that such a court would advantage large land claimants over smaller holders. Instead of creating a special court, Smith suggested that existing local courts could instead determine the validity of land claims. When it became apparent that the Court of Private Land Claims was to be created, Smith attempted to have Arizona excluded from the court's jurisdiction by arguing the territory had less than a dozen land claims, only two of which had any validity.

During the course of his career, Smith regularly spoke in favor of developing water resources in the West. His first term saw the introduction of a bill to survey Arizona to identify suitable sites for storage dams and reservoirs and to reserve the land at any located sites. Another topic on which he routinely expressed his opinion was dealing with the territory's indigenous population. His views on the subject are shown in a speech he gave on February 18, 1890, when Smith said, "We of the West are not brutal or even unjust to the Indian, but we sympathize more with civilization than with savagery. We much desire to see the Indian improved and the white man protected. We wish to see a human being made out of the Apache Indian." Toward this end, Smith advocated in his first term against increasing the size of Indian reservations, claiming much of Arizona's best real estate had already been given to "a lot of idle, vagabond, murderous Indians".

As his first term neared an end, Smith received his party's nomination for a second term in September 1888. His Republican challenger was Thomas F. Wilson who argued Benjamin Harrison would win the Presidential election of 1888 and Arizona would do better with a territorial delegate of the same party as the incoming President. After reading the speeches Smith had given while in the House most Arizona settlers felt the first term delegate had done a good job representing their interests, allowing him to win an easy electoral victory. Much of the margin of victory coming from voters in the Gila River valley who agreed with Smith's opposition to the Court of Private Land Claims.

In 1889, Smith began developing political connections in Maricopa County. With the rapid growth of Phoenix increasing the political influence of county, Smith purchased an ownership interest in the Arizona Gazette to ensure a friendly newspaper in the area. Professionally, Smith joined with Ben Goodrich and Webster Street to found the legal firm of Goodrich, Street & Smith. Despite the firm's office being located in Phoenix, the partners traveled the territory and practiced where there was need for their services. Finally, with Governor C. Meyer Zulick falling out of political favor, Smith took steps to distance himself.

== Wham robbery trial ==
While waiting to return for the next session of Congress, Smith's new legal firm became defense counsel for the Wham Paymaster Robbery trial. The case involved the May 1889 ambush of a U.S. Army detachment transporting roughly US$26,000 in gold coins between Fort Grant and Fort Thomas. Based largely upon reports the black soldiers assigned as guards for the payroll that the robbers had fled toward the Mormon town of Solomonville, eight men had been arrested for the crime. After taking the case, Smith and his partner, Ben Goodrich, performed extensive prep work.

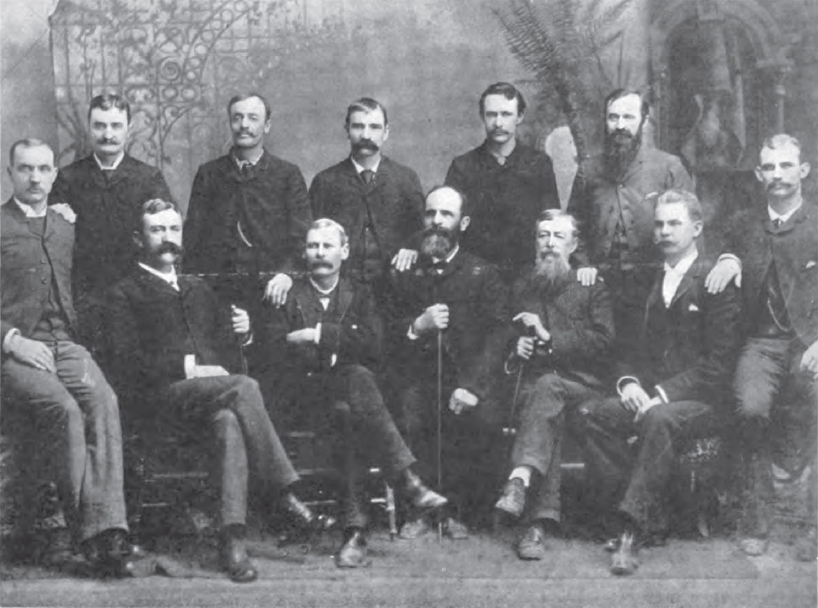
Defendants and defense counsel for the Wham Paymaster Robbery trial

The trial began in November 1889 with Judge Richard E. Sloan running a strict courtroom. Smith used his preparatory work to attack the prosecution's case. During his testimony, Major Joseph Washington Wham, who had been in command of the payroll detachment, identified newly minted coins in the safe deposit box of one of the defendants as coming from the coins stolen during the robbery. During cross examination, Smith asked Wham to separate the identified coins from similar ones borrowed from a local bank. Wham was unable to do so. Smith followed this by pointing out that U.S. Marshall William K. Meade had not gone to the site of the attack to check a claim that following the robbery the robbers had fled directly to Mexico. During closing arguments, Smith played upon the biases of the jurors and criticized the court. When Judge Sloan rebuked Smith over the criticisms, Smith feigned ignorance about the judge's concerns. It was not until Smith was threatened with a US$500 fine that the defense counsel backed down. At the end of the trial the defense won an acquittal.

The effect of the trial to Smith's reputation lasted for years. Even though none of the defendants were Mormon, attitude of the day blamed Mormons for the robbery. Smith refused to play upon this attitude by suggesting Mormon involvement as part of his defense. As a result, the Territorial Delegate was able to count on a large portion of the "Mormon vote" for the remainder of his political career. At the same time, Smith was accused of receiving some of the stolen gold as part of his legal fees. An example of this is a Tucson Citizen cartoon depicting the defendants and defense attorneys with the caption "The Wham Robbers – Which is Mark Smith?"

Due to time demands of the Wham case, Smith arrived in Washington after the start of the 51st United States Congress. His second term saw the Territorial Delegate introduce 46 bills, two of which were enacted into law. Smith introduced bills to reduce the size of the White Mountain Indian Reservation, allowing stray cattle which crossed into Mexico to be returned without payment of a tariff, allowing foreign ownership of mining operations, and dealing with squatters on railroad land. Among the relief bills he introduced was a request to reimburse Solomon Warner US$2227.50 for hardware and gunpowder that had been taken from him during the American Civil War. On January 6, 1890, Smith introduced his first Arizona statehood bill. While it had no realistic hope for passage at that time, the introduction was timed to occur during a flurry of activity that saw six new states admitted to the Union between November 2, 1889, and July 10, 1890. By the end of his second term, only 4 of the 87 resolutions and bills Smith had introduced in Congress had been passed. Despite the lack of measurable results the Territorial Delegate had been building a reserve of congressional goodwill, particularly among Democratic members of the House.

As Congress was preparing to adjourn before the elections of 1890, Smith contracted malaria and his return to Arizona was delayed till mid-October. As a result, the campaign was already in progress upon his return to Arizona. The Democratic territorial platform was similar to previous years but called for statehood, abolishing certain territorial offices, and opposition to creating of a special court dealing with land claims. The Republicans, in turn, had been forced to settle on George W. Cheyney, Superintendent of Public Instruction and mine owner from Tombstone, for their nominee when Nathan O. Murphy and several other potential candidates declined the nomination. These circumstances allowed Smith to win a third term but with a small margin of victory.

During the second session of the 51st United States Congress, Smith attacked the growing Indian rights movement. He called the movement "sickening in the sight of dead friends in Arizona". The Arizona Delegate then used the actions of the Apache Kid to label all Apache Scouts as untrustworthy and worthless. To this Smith called for removal of the Papago people. Furthermore, he opposed providing funds for Indian schools. When it was proposed slaughterhouses be built, Smith called for clarification on whether they were for "the slaughter of beeves, the slaughter of Indians, or the slaughter of white people." He then requested the funding bill explicitly exclude "beeves and white people."

== Constitutional convention ==
By early 1891 there was a strong statehood movement in Arizona Territory. When the U.S. Congress declined to authorize a constitutional convention for the territory, the 16th Arizona Territorial Legislature decided to correct the oversight. The hope being that if the territory had a state constitution written it would aid in the effort to win statehood for the territory. Based upon the legislature's actions, Governor John N. Irwin issued a proclamation calling for the election of 22 delegates to a constitutional convention. Smith was one of three delegates chosen to represent Cochise County, with the convention meeting from September 7 till October 3, 1891.

The convention used the committee system, with Smith serving on seven of the twelve committees. He was appointed to committees on Preamble, Bill of Rights, Ways and Means, Water, Irrigation, and Reservoirs, and Rules and Permanent Organization. He became chairman for committees on Mileage and the Legislative Department. Smith opposed disenfranchisement of the territory's Mormon population by inclusion of the "Idaho test oath" which would have required all voters to swear they did not belong to any sect or group that "taught, practiced, or encouraged polygamy or bigamy." On the issue of women's suffrage, he took no position.

The proposed constitution included support for bimetallism and advocated for irrigation of public land and construction of railroads. State legislators were required to announce any personal interests they might have in an issue before the legislature and then to not vote on the matter. Women's' suffrage was limited to school elections while the document condemned polygamy. Arizona voters approved the proposed document during a December 1891 special election.

Upon returning to Washington, Smith introduced a statehood bill based upon the new constitution on January 15, 1892. The bill quickly died in committee. In early February 1892, Smith was transferred from Committee on Land Claims to Committee on Territories. On March 14, 1892, Smith introduced another bill to grant statehood to Arizona. This bill passed House by a vote of 173 to 13 but died in the Senate Committee on Territories. The Republican-controlled Senate at the time not wishing to grant statehood to the predominantly Democratic Arizona Territory In between his lobbying efforts in support of the statehood bill, Smith spoke out against educational aid for Indians. He felt Indians should only be trained to be farmers and reservations should be reduced in size to open additional areas for prospecting.

During the election of 1892, the Republicans selected Flagstaff attorney William G. "Mikey" Stewart to run against Smith. The campaign consisted primarily of mudslinging, with Smith's opposition claiming he drank excessively. Newspapers supporting Smith responded by focusing not upon Stewart but upon the drinking habits of Stewart's legal partner, Edward M. Doe. As Smith's drinking habits were better known than those of his opponent, he tended to catch the worst of the mudslinging. Despite this, Smith won by a larger margin of victory than his during his previous run.

In addition to the election, 1892 saw the start of dissension within the Arizona Democratic Party. While L. C. Hughes had been an early supporter of Smith, Hughes desire to be appointed governor caused tensions. During the 1892 Democratic National Convention, the territorial delegation had been instructed to support David B. Hill. Hughes changed the support to Grover Cleveland. Smith responded by providing Cleveland copies of articles critical to Cleveland that Hughes had printed. Hughes was able to shift blame after a friend of his in Minneapolis, R. A. Carple, claimed to be the author of the articles. With issue apparently settled, Hughes was appointed Governor of Arizona Territory in April 1893. By October 1893, Governor Hughes had created a division in the territorial Democratic party. While Smith made no public attacks on Governor Hughes, the governor believed that Smith was working with C. Meyer Zulick to secure his removal almost as soon as his appointment was made.

Once the 53rd United States Congress convened, Smith's time was consumed by lobbying for statehood and performance of routine efforts. As the session began his committee assignments were changed to Indian Affairs, Public Lands, and Territories. Smith quickly submitted an updated statehood bill that again won House approval before becoming bogged down in the Senate. With Democrats having won control of both Congressional houses during the 1892 elections, fears of Arizona sending Democrats to the Senate no longer prevailed. Instead opposition to Arizona statehood shifted to section 16 of the 1891 constitution which mandated support of bimetallism. With Arizona calling for bimetallism and the Cleveland administration dominated by supporters of the gold standard, opposition to Arizona statehood proved too great to overcome. On January 19, 1895, Smith called for a reduction of maintenance funding to the Carlisle Indian Industrial School. During the final session of the 53 Congress, Smith only introduced a single bill dealing with a railroad right-of-way. Over the course of his fourth term, four of the thirty bills Smith submitted were enacted into law.

== Breaks in service ==
With the Arizona Democratic party in relative disarray and fighting to prevent a split, Smith decided not to run for reelection in 1894. Smith's wife began suffering from severe health problems in 1893 and the official reason for not running was concerns for her well-being. Critics countered by claiming he was afraid of losing if he stood for reelection. Smith's inability to gain statehood for Arizona or to block creation of the Court of Private Land Claims both diminishing the Territorial Delegate's popularity.

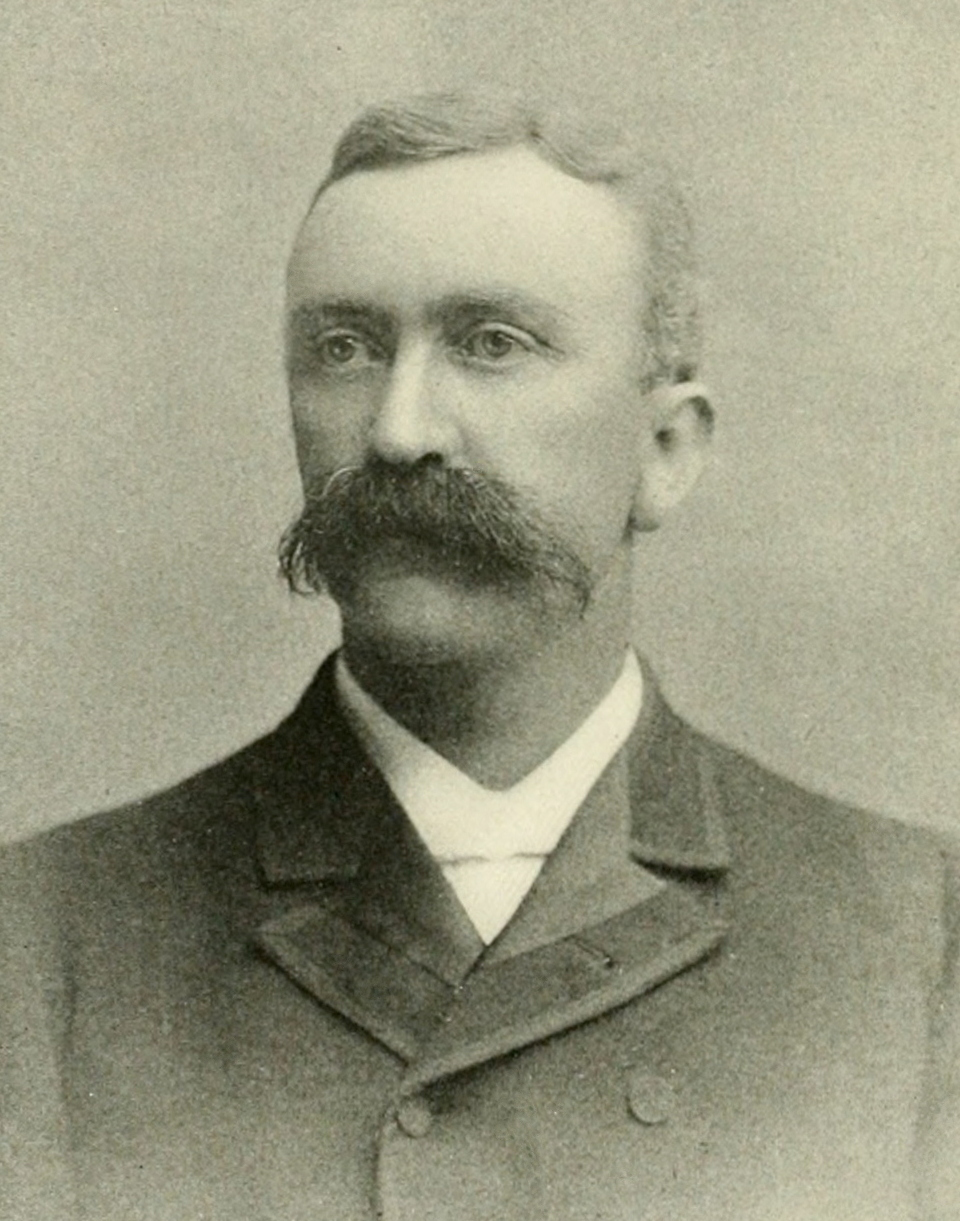
Arizona Territorial Delegate to Congress Mark Smith (c. 1899)

After his term expired, Smith returned to Tombstone and resumed in private legal practice. In July 1895, Smith paid a visit to Governor Hughes in Phoenix. The visit had the effect of easing tensions and restoring unity within the Arizona Democratic party. The easing proved to be short lived and soon after the Arizona Daily Star, which was published by Governor Hughes, was accused of insufficient support of the Democratic nominee for Territorial Delegate during the 1894 election and being overly sympathetic to Republican Oakes Murphy. Smith was appointed Assistant United States Attorney in October 1895. Consequentially, he moved to Tucson in early 1896.

At the beginning of 1896, efforts to replace Governor Hughes had intensified with Territorial Secretary Charles M. Bruce, Territorial Attorney General Francis J. Heney, and U.S. Marshal William K. Meade working for the governor's removal. Smith supported the new effort and while in Washington, D.C., on official business during March 1896 visited the White House. When the governor was removed at the end of March 1896, Smith was credited as being a key part of the removal effort. Shortly thereafter Hughes' newspapers began an attack on Smith, accusing him of having improperly backing Republican rancher Colin Cameron for a seat on the Arizona Cattle Sanitary Commission and of having agreed to support the Gold standard in exchange for the governor's removal.

Smith announced his candidacy for Territorial delegate on August 29, 1896. After Governor Franklin declined to run for the office the other candidate for the Democratic nomination was Winthorp A. Rowe, the President of the 1891 constitutional convention. Smith won the nomination on the first round by a vote of 65–30. With the nomination secured, Smith resigned as Assistant United States Attorney so he could run for office. During the general election the Republicans suffered divisions over currency issues when their party platform supported the Gold Standard. At the same time, newspapers controlled by Hughes began running stories attacking Smith. The attacks backfired and many voters still unhappy with the former governor decided to support the Democratic nominee. When election day arrived, Smith won a plurality over Republican Andrew J. Doran and Populist Buckey O'Neill.

When the 55th United States Congress convened, Smith was returned to the Committees for Indian Affairs, Public Lands, and Territories. To this was added an assignment on the Military Affairs panel. This unusually favorable set of assignments was due to the friendships Smith had made during his previous terms in Congress. As a Democrat, Smith had minimal impact in the Republican-controlled Congress. His attempt to introduce legislation supportive of bimetallism was blocked and he argued unsuccessfully against the Dingley Tariff. Smith repeatedly spoke out against the Annexation of Hawaii but supported President McKinley in the buildup to the Spanish–American War. During the course of his fifth term Smith introduced 22 bills. While his usual statehood bill failed to be passed, Smith was successful in gaining authorization to build a permanent capital building in Phoenix and in gaining a railroad right-of-way to the south rim of the Grand Canyon.

Smith had been planning to seek reelection during most of 1898. This changed days before the September nominating convention when Smith received word that his wife had become severely ill while in Los Angeles. He immediately took a train to be with her and was accompanied by his primary challenger for the nomination, John F. Wilson, who did not wish to "appear as though he were taking advantage of Mark." When the convention began, Smith returned and withdrew his name from consideration. After Wilson was selected as the Democratic nominee, Smith stumped for him throughout Southern Arizona.

When his term ended, Smith returned to private legal practice in Tucson. He arranged for a minimal work load and spent most of his time tending to his wife. Elizabeth Smith's health continued to decline and she died on October 16, 1899. She was buried in Evergreen Cemetery.

By the end of 1899, Smith began showing interest in returning to Washington, D.C., as Arizona's Territorial Delegate. Wilson was proving to be a popular delegate and calls were made for Smith not to run. Nevertheless, in early 1900 Smith announced his intention to challenge for his old position. As each candidate tried to obtain delegates for the territorial convention, Maricopa county became the key battleground. The county held an election to select delegates to the territorial convention on September 1 with a county level convention held four days later. The results of the election were quickly contested, with one newspaper hostile to Smith claiming the number of votes in Phoenix's 4th wards exceeded the total number of voters in the ward. A ruling by Albert C. Baker allowed delegates from the contested precincts to be included in the election results, giving Smith effective control of the territorial convention.

Wilson supporters, unhappy with the election results, selected their own set of delegates to send to the convention. The September 12 convention began with two individuals, one a Smith supporter and the other a Wilson supporter, claiming the role of temporary chairman. When the convention secretary refused to allow the Maricopa county Wilson supporters to be recognized by the convention, a fight broke out and police were called in to break up the resulting riot. Negotiations between the two camps failed to find a resolution and on the second day of the convention the two groups split with Smith supporters congregating on the east side of the convention hall and Wilson supporters on the west. At one point, Wilson decided to withdraw from the race at the convention but the candidate was convinced not to do so by his wife. By the end of the convention, each group had selected their own set of convention officers and nominees. As the campaign began, several proposals were made to correct the split by Wilson but were rejected by Smith as either unworkable or unfairly favoring the Wilson campaign. It was not until Wilson withdrew from the race on October 12 that the split in the Democratic party ended. Despite the unusual campaign, Smith still won his sixth term as Territorial Delegate.

== Joint statehood battle ==
Smith was assigned to the committees on Indian Affairs, Mines and Mining, and Territories when the 57th United States Congress convened in December 1901. Early in the first session he called for a storage dam to be built with federal funds along the Gila River arguing "This is an appropriation for the purpose of providing a large number of peaceful Indians along the Gila River, in Arizona, with a means of earning a living." While the request came true several months later with passage of the Newlands Reclamation Act, it did not mark a change in Smith's attitude towards Arizona's indigenous population as later the same day he stated "the best Apache I ever saw was the one who had spent four years in the penitentiary." Smith also requested additional mineral exploration be allowed on Indian lands.

Most of Smith's efforts during the term went towards Arizona's campaign for statehood. He joined with New Mexico Territorial Delegate Bernard Shandon Rodey and Oklahoma Territory Delegate Dennis Thomas Flynn to introduce an Omnibus statehood bill intended to grant statehood to the three territories. Governors Oakes Murphy of Arizona and Miguel Otero of New Mexico even went to Washington to give a joint appearance in support of the Omnibus bill. After receiving a favorable committee report the bill advanced to the full House in May 1902. On May 9, Representative Jesse Overstreet of Indiana introduced an amendment to the Omnibus bill that Arizona and New Mexico territories be combined and admitted as a single state named Montezuma. Smith quickly attacked the proposed amendment on the floor of the House, arguing that Arizona and New Mexico had separate histories, financial situations, capitol buildings, and legal systems and that the two territory's habitable regions were separated by physical barriers. He concluded by claiming the purpose of the amendment was to ensure defeat of the Omnibus bill. Smith's speech was sufficiently rousing that the Congressional Report shows it received "long continued applause." The effort Smith put into the speech then resulted in his collapse upon the House floor. After Smith was taken away, the amendment was rejected and the Omnibus bill approved by voice vote.

Physicians were initially concerned Smith had suffered a stroke but were able to determine this had not happened. The collapse instead appeared to have been caused by a lack of sleep the night before, caused by Smith's last minute lobbying efforts, and the exertion of his speech. After two weeks he was well enough to travel to Kentucky to continue his recuperation. Remembering the 1900 election, Smith's associates called upon him to make an early decision on whether he would run in 1902. Smith announced he would not run for reelection on May 29, 1902. During the election he campaigned for the Democratic nominee, John F. Wilson, but did so, as noted by the territorial press, with the "heartiness and alacrity with which the school boy rushes to take castor oil."

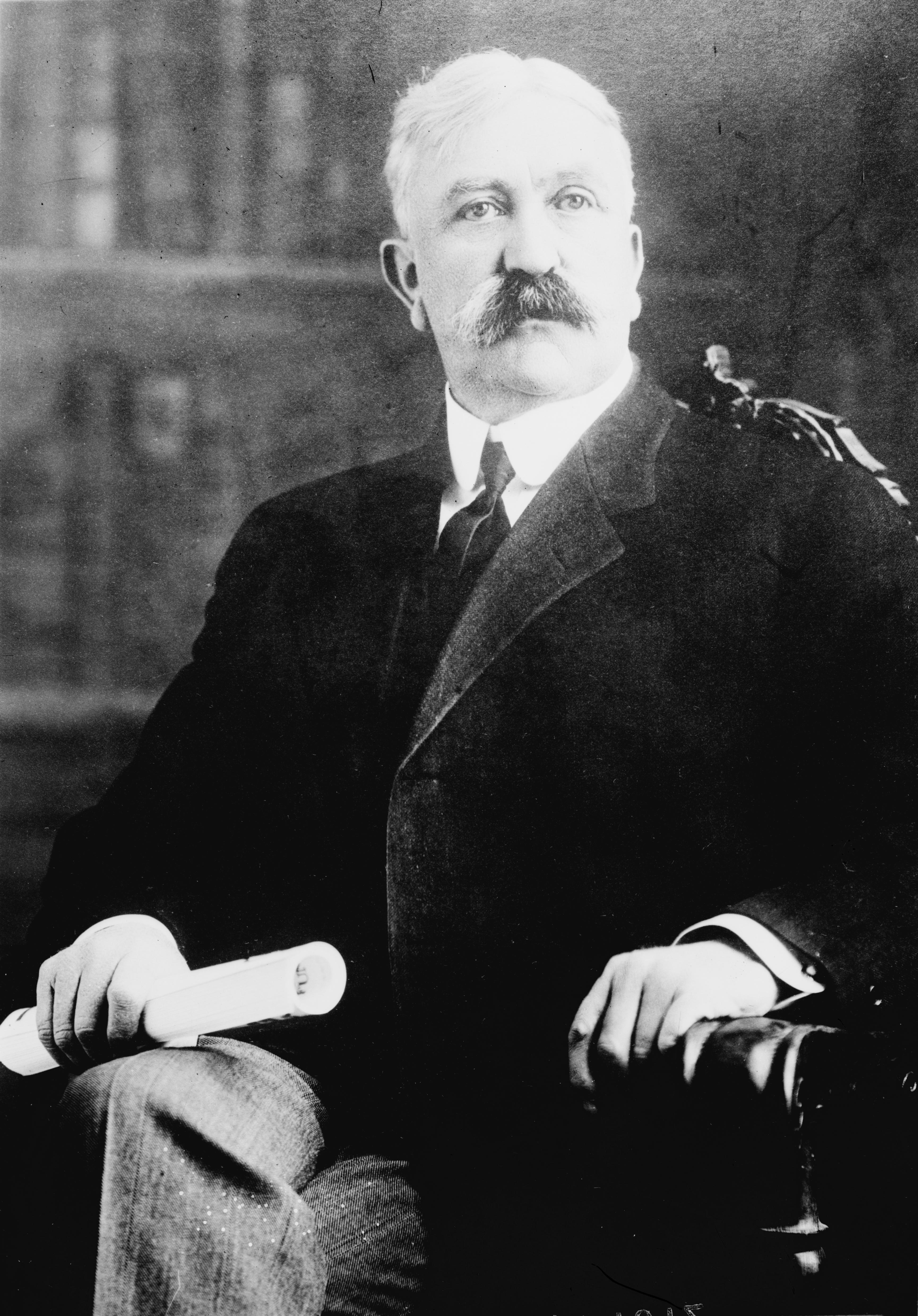
Marcus A. Smith

By the time Smith returned to work, the Omnibus bill had moved to the Senate and Senator Albert J. Beveridge of Indiana was leading the joint statehood efforts. In June 1902 Senator Matthew Quay of Pennsylvania had organized a coalition of Senate Democrats and a dozen Republicans large enough to ensure passage of the Omnibus bill. Beveridge instead prevented the bill from receiving a vote in the full Senate by a 6–4 party line vote in the United States Senate Committee on Territories.

After Congress adjourned on July 1, 1902, Smith visited Karlsbad, Bohemia for several weeks of rest and recovery. Soon after his return to the United States, Beveridge organized a congressional fact finding trip to Arizona searching for signs the territory was not ready for statehood. Accompanying Beveridge on the three-day visit were Senators Henry E. Burnham of New Hampshire, William P. Dillingham of Vermont, and Henry Heitfeld of Idaho. The group was joined by Senator Thomas R. Bard of California during their stop in Prescott. During the lame duck session in early 1903, Smith commented upon the trip, saying "I met the committee—I never could have overtaken it—at Phoenix and it remained one day ... and 'investigated' a police judge and some census enumerators, and had an interpreter with them scouting the town to see whether some Mexicans could be found who could not speak English and prove valuable witnesses for the purpose of the investigation." Hopes for passage of the Omnibus bill died as Senator Beveridge used parliamentary techniques to prevent the Omnibus bill receiving a Senate vote before the 57th Congress adjourned.

When his term ended, Smith returned to private legal practice in Tucson. In February 1904, Smith went to Mexico City to defend his ownership interest of some mines in Sonora before the Supreme Court of Mexico As the election of 1904 approached, Wilson announced he would step down as Territorial Delegate. Smith accepted the Democratic nomination unopposed. During the campaign, Democratic newspapers that had once been solid Smith supporters gave him only tepid support. Republican newspapers, in turn, attacked Smith's past failures to secure statehood for the territory. The Republicans also attempted to label Smith as a supporter of the joint statehood movement. Voters did not agree with these claims and Smith won by the narrowest margin of his career.

In October 1905, Smith led a congressional delegation on a tour of the territory. The tour was hosted by a variety of railroad and mining interests within the territory and ended with a visit to the Grand Canyon. Following the trip, the majority of the visiting delegates joined the opposition to the joint statehood effort. As the first session of the 59th United States Congress convened, Smith was assigned to Committees on Post Office and Post Roads, Public Lands, and Territories. Smith dealt primarily with statehood issues during the session but managed to obtain funding to build courthouses in Apache, Gila, Mohave, and Yuma counties.

Upon his return to Congress, Smith found the joint statehood battle largely as he had left it. Senator Bevridge was still working to create what he called "Arizona the Great". Meanwhile, Senator Joseph B. Foraker of Ohio had replaced Senator Quay as the champion for an independent Arizona. On December 11, 1905, Foraker sponsored an amendment to a Senate statehood bill calling for Arizona and New Mexico to hold a referendum on the joint statehood proposal. The "Foraker amendment" was initially written by Smith and called for voters to answer the question "Shall Arizona and New Mexico be united to form one State?" The amendment furthermore required both territories to approve joint statehood or else the merger would be blocked. The amendment was passed into law on March 9, 1906.

In August 1906, Smith attended a joint meeting of the Democratic and Republican territorial committees where the two groups decided to work together to defeat the joint statehood proposal during the referendum. The next month Smith accepted his party's nomination for an eighth term in Congress. In the race for Territorial Delegate, both Smith and his Republican challenger strongly opposed joint statehood but Smith received the majority of the credit for leading the fight for an independent Arizona. As a result, he won reelection. The joint statehood referendum in turn was defeated by the Arizona voters 16,265 to 3,141 while New Mexico voters cast 26,195 for and 14,735 against.

During the 60th United States Congress, Smith introduced bills to limit the amount of federal land set aside for military use, national forests, and Indian reservations. While the Progressive Era was well under way, Smith avoided taking a position on national level issues of the day. He instead continued the battle for Arizona statehood, introducing another statehood bill in January 1908.

When Smith returned from Washington, D.C., in May 1908, the lack of the usual reception crowd indicated a decline in the Delegate's popularity. He however decided to still run for another term in office. Smith won his party's nomination but a challenge by Eugene Brady O'Neill resulted in a Democratic platform more reflective of the party's "Progressive" wing than Smith's "Old Guard" views. During his campaign, Smith emphasized his contributions to defeating the joint statehood proposal, aid he had provided settlers in resolving land claims and his support of reclamation projects while denying he was controlled by corporate interests. Newspapers meanwhile criticized his nomination by claiming it had been made by "the machine" and not by the majority of party supporters. On October 10, 1908, Smith announced he had received a letter from William Jennings Bryan requesting he aid the Presidential nominee during a five-state speaking tour. As a result of the request, Smith was absent from the territory during most of the campaign. It was not until October 30 that Smith returned to Arizona, by which time speculation was flying that he had foreseen his coming defeat and had manufactured the letter as an excuse. With the hope that a Republican representative could gain statehood for Arizona after Smith's years of failure, many Democrats contributed to Smiths defeat by voting for Ralph Cameron.

Smith introduced his final statehood bill when the 60th United States Congress reconvened in December 1908. It failed as all its predecessors had. In February 1909, Representative Augustus O. Stanley of Kentucky gave a farewell speech for Smith that marked the territorial delegate's last day as a sitting member of the House of Representatives.

== New political image ==
Shortly after his inauguration in 1909, President William Taft began work to fulfill the plank in his party's platform to grant Arizona statehood. An Arizona statehood bill introduced on January 20, 1910, was passed by both houses of Congress, and signed into law in June 1910. Smith was critical of the bill as it required both Congressional and Presidential approval of the new state's constitution. Following the October 1910 constitutional convention, Smith was initially unhappy with the resulting document. This changed at the start of 1911 and Smith became a supporter of the proposed constitution. Following voter approval of the new constitution in February 1911, Congress passed a resolution to admit Arizona as a state. President Taft refused to sign the resolution because of the constitution's provision allowing for recall of judges. A second congressional resolution allowing for statehood if the recall provision was removed was passed and signed by the President on August 21, 1911.

Smith announced his candidacy for one of Arizona's two senate seats on September 24, 1911 As the campaign began, Smith abandoned his long-standing conservative stand and declared himself a "Progressive". During the primaries, questions arose about whether Smith had been in the employ of the Southern Pacific Railroad or any other corporate interests during his years as a Territorial Delegate. Smith responded on the day before the primary election with a long statement denying any such corporate involvement had ever existed. When results were counted, Smith finished first in the six-way Democratic primary with Henry F. Ashurst securing the party's second nomination. During the general election Smith called for the voters to support "known progressives on the Democratic ticket" while The Arizona Republican noted the former conservative had become a "radical of the most pronounced type." Following the general election on December 12, 1911, Smith was annoyed that he had placed second behind Ashurst.

== U.S. Senate ==
The Arizona State Legislature confirmed the selection of Smith and Ashurst as the state's first U.S. Senators on March 26, 1912. (the Seventeenth Amendment to the United States Constitution, allowing for direct election of U.S. Senators, had not yet been adopted.) The two men were sworn in on April 2, 1912. During the casting of lots to determine his Senate class, Smith was assigned to Class 3 with an initial term ending in March 1915. Following the ceremony, he expressed regret that he had drawn a shorter initial term than Ashurst.

Upon his entry into the Senate, Smith was assigned to the committees on the District of Columbia, Geological Survey, Public Land, Irrigation and Reclamation, Railroads The 62nd United States Congress was in its second session at the time of his entry and, with the 1912 U.S. Presidential election approaching, the new senator found the Republican majority split between Roosevelt and Taft supporters. As a Democrat, Smith avoided the rivalry and allowed the two sides to damage each other. He instead worked for various appropriations for Arizona projects and to have Fort Grant, Arizona, converted from a military base into a state operated reform school. On national issues he voted to raise the age for U.S. Navy retirement from 62 to 70, opposed requiring a literacy test for immigration to the United States, and voted to abolish the United States Commerce Court. After President Taft nominated Richard E. Sloan as the first judge on the United States District Court for the District of Arizona, Smith worked to block the confirmation. Smith's reasons for opposing the judge are unknown but may have been as much personal as they were political. During the lame duck session in early 1913, Smith sought relief funds for farmers in the Colorado River valley affected by the floods that created the Salton Sea and for displaced Americans, many of whom were Mormon, that were forced to flee from the Mexican Revolution.

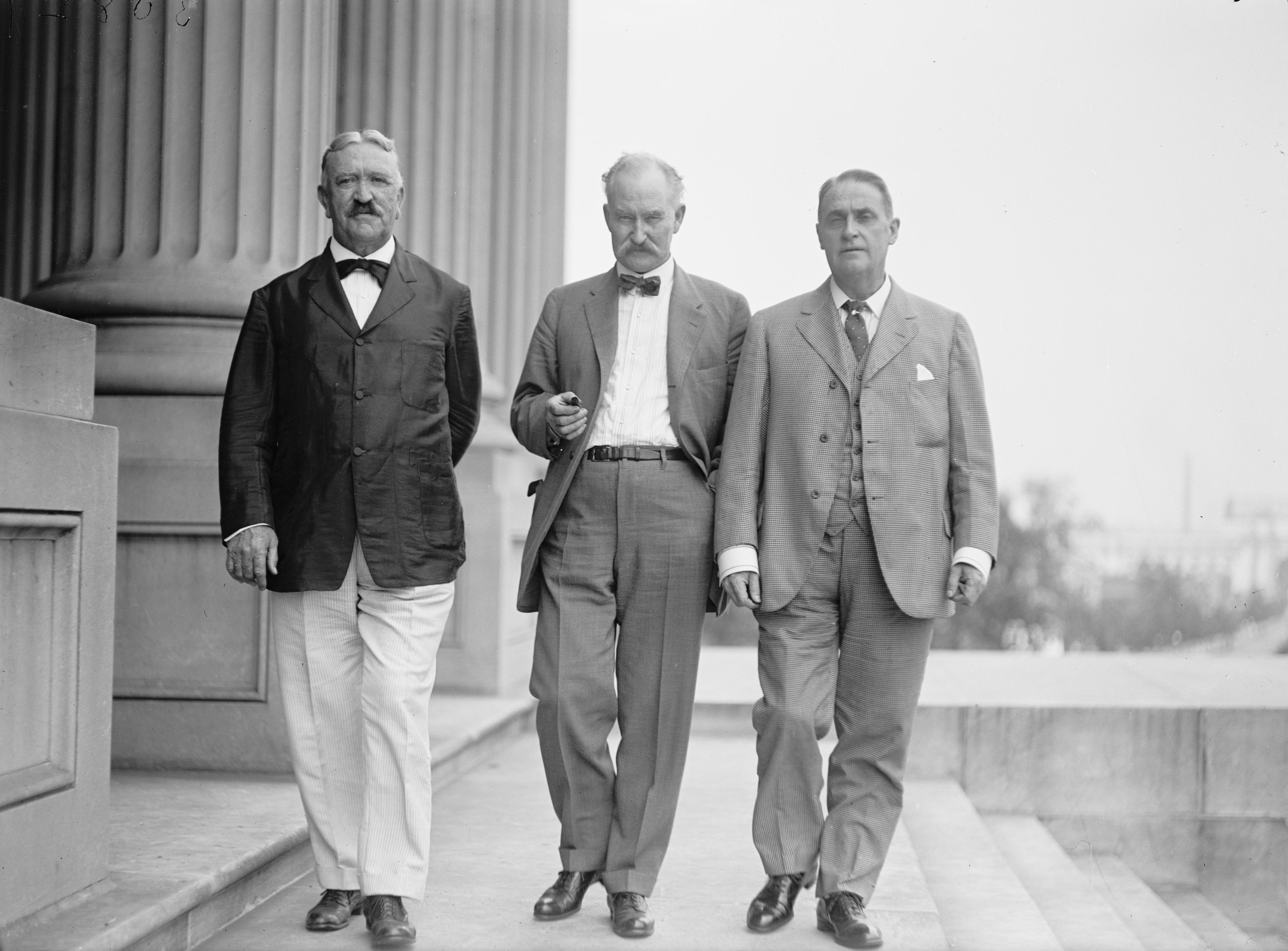
Smith (l) with U.S. Senators Albert B. Fall (c) and Frank B. Brandegee (r)

The 63rd United States Congress brought a Democratic majority to the Senate. Smith also received a new set of committee assignments. He became Chairman of the Panel on Irrigation and Reclamation while accepting positions on the committees for Conservation of National Resources, the District of Columbia, Foreign Relations, Geological Survey, Printing, Public Lands, and Railroads. Smith recommended the United States take a stand on the Mexican Revolution before European powers invaded the country. He also suggested the United States seize Baja California to gain full control of the Colorado River. In issues directly affecting Arizona, he opposed financial support for water wells for Indians living off the reservation but joined with Carl Hayden in supporting irrigation projects within reservation boundaries. With the new Congress, Smith became a supporter of Woodrow Wilson's "New Freedom" initiatives. Smith initially called for a high tariff on wool to aid sheep ranchers in his state. He abandoned this position in July 1913 to support the Underwood Act. Later that year he supported passage of the Federal Reserve Act while 1914 saw him vote for the Federal Trade Commission Act and Clayton Antitrust Act.

Patronage requests were a point of concern for Smith and his handling of them angered potential supporters. When Governor Hunt announced he had no intentions of running for Smith's senate seat observers noted that many of Smith's appointments had gone to Hunt supporters. Following Hunt's announcement, the Governor threw his network of support behind Smith. As the 1914 elections approached, Smith's well-known drinking habit cost him votes from supporters of prohibition. This was balanced on September 5, 1914, when President Wilson sent a telegram stating it would be a "serious loss to the public" if Smith was not reelected for another term in the U.S. Senate. Smith's support proved sufficient and he won a majority of the votes in a five-way general election.

=== Second term ===
As the 64th United States Congress began, Smith continued with his normal efforts to obtain funding for bridges, irrigation systems, public buildings, and pensions. With the increasing importance of the automobile, he added "good roads" to his list of interests. The Arizona Senator advocated control of National Forests be transferred to the states. While in January 1916, he spoke against making the Philippines a colony of the United States Throughout the Congress, Smith voted with his party. Towards this end he continued to support New Freedom legislation such as the Adamson Act, Federal Farm Loan Act, Warehouse Act of 1916 With the outbreak of World War I, Smith supported Wilson's neutrality position but did vote in support of military preparedness legislation. On September 8, 1916, Smith voted to confirm Louis Brandeis as an Associate Justice of the Supreme Court of the United States.

By the start of the 65th United States Congress, Smith's advancing age was forcing him to take a less active role in day-to-day politics. He also gained a seat on the Appropriations committee. His committee chairmanship was changed from the Irrigation and Reclamation panel to the Committee on Printing. Smith was absent from the Senate when vote for the United States to enter World War I occurred. He was, however, a supporter of the war effort. Towards this end he voted for the Espionage Act of 1917, Selective Service Act of 1917, and to create Liberty Bonds. His support for wartime legislation was not absolute as Smith objected to sections of the Sedition Act of 1918 which required proof of intent during the commission of sedition. In addition to war-related activities, Smith served as a floor leader for ratification of the Migratory Bird Treaty Act of 1918. During the third session of the 65th Congress, Smith joined with Senator Ashurst in a call for the United States to purchase Baja California from Mexico.

The 1918 Senate elections returned control of the Senate to the Republicans. Smith voted for the Nineteenth Amendment to the United States Constitution, granting Women's suffrage but was absent from much of the 66th United States Congress' first session. He was instead occupied in Kentucky visiting sick relatives. When President Woodrow Wilson proposed creating the League of Nations, Smith became an avid supporter of the plan.

Despite his advancing age, Smith was determined to win another term in the election of 1920. The senator's support for the League of Nations became a campaign issue. Meanwhile, labor unions were upset with the senator over his voting record on labor issues. He overcame these issues to win the Democratic primary. During the general election, Ralph Cameron attacked Smith on these two issues and added that while Smith had found time to visit Kentucky he had rarely returned to Arizona during the previous six years. Smith countered by pointing out that there had been no Senate recess long enough to allow for a trip from Washington, D.C., to Arizona. Smith could not overcome these issues and lost in the general election.

== Later life ==
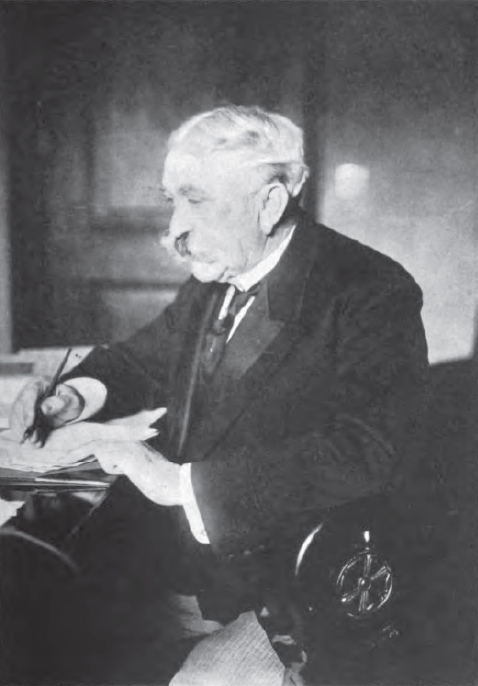
Smith in his later years

The loss of his reelection bid left Smith embittered. Additionally, his remaining financial resources were limited and Smith found himself in need of a job. To address these concerns Smith's friend, Epes Randolph, told him "Mark, you should go back to Washington and say to President Wilson, 'Mr. President, I've made a damn fool of myself over you a good many times—now you make a damn fool of yourself over me just once—give me some kind of a job'" Smith followed this advice and was appointed to the International Joint Commission on March 3, 1921, the last full day in office for both the senator and President.

During his final years, Smith lived in Washington's Occidental Hotel, taking occasional trips to Kentucky to visit his remaining family. In Washington, he received only occasional visits from a niece living in Kentucky. The solitude bothered him as shown in a January 1924 note where he wrote: "was surenuff lonesome and hungry to hear something of old friends." His health also began to decline as he developed arthritis in his left hip. Smith's outlook of this development was shown by his statement, "I can't walk a step without the crutches, and even that aid can't prevent suffering. The doctors call it arthritis—I call it hell, for that is what it really amounts to." With less than a dozen friends from his early days in Arizona, Smith longed to be with "my dogs and gun, my friends, my fishing rod, the trees and flowers and songs of birds and babbling brooks. Losing these paints the receding landscape in dull drab leaden colors in taking away the great attractions of life before demanding its surrender."

Smith died on April 7, 1924, of heart disease. His death was announced to the United States Senate by Henry F. Ashurst. Smith was buried in Cynthiana, Kentucky at the Battle Grove Cemetery. His tombstone epitaph, written by Smith himself, reads "Here lies a good man – a lover of fast horses, pretty women and good whiskey".

== Election history ==
County Attorney for Cochise County, 1882
Party	Candidate	Votes	%
Democratic	Mark Smith	1,538	56.8
Republican	Lyttleton Price	1,170	43.2

Arizona Territorial Delegate, 1886
Party	Candidate	Votes	%
Democratic	Mark Smith	6,355	58.7
Republican	Curtis Coe Bean	4,472	41.3

Arizona Territorial Delegate, 1888
Party	Candidate	Votes	%
Democratic	Mark Smith	7,686	56.9
Republican	Thomas F. Wilson	5,832	43.1

Arizona Territorial Delegate, 1890
Party	Candidate	Votes	%
Democratic	Mark Smith	6,137	55.4
Republican	George W. Cheyney	4,941	44.6

Arizona Territorial Delegate, 1892
Party	Candidate	Votes	%
Democratic	Mark Smith	6,470	55.6
Republican	William G. "Mikey" Stewart	5,171	44.4

Arizona Territorial Delegate, 1896
Party	Candidate	Votes	%
Democratic	Mark Smith	6,065	43.9
Republican	Andrew J. Doran	4,049	29.3
Populists	Buckey O'Neill	3,695	26.8

Arizona Territorial Delegate, 1900
Party	Candidate	Votes	%
Democratic	Mark Smith	8,664	52.1
Republican	Oakes Murphy	7,664	46.1
Prohibition	Charles N. Davidson	292	1.8

Arizona Territorial Delegate, 1904
Party	Candidate	Votes	%
Democratic	Mark Smith	10,394	48.5
Republican	Benjamin D. Fowler	9,522	44.4
Socialist	Francis S. Shaw	1,304	6.1
Prohibition	O. Gibson	125	0.6
Socialist Labor	J. C. Leach	82	0.4

Arizona Territorial Delegate, 1906
Party	Candidate	Votes	%
Democratic	Mark Smith	11,101	49.1
Republican	William F. Cooper	8.909	39.4
Socialist	Joseph D. Cannon	2,078	9.2
Joint Statehood Party	Charles F. Ainsworth	508	2.2

Arizona Territorial Delegate, 1908
Party	Candidate	Votes	%
Republican	Ralph H. Cameron	12,435	47.1
Democratic	Mark Smith	11,727	44.5
Socialist	Joseph D. Cannon	1,912	7.2
Independence	William B. Cleary	118	0.4
Prohibition	R. Roy Sibley	106	0.4
Socialist Labor	J. W. Stewart	82	0.3

Democratic primary, United States Senate special election, 1911
Party	Candidate	Votes	%
Democratic	Mark Smith	4,459	
Democratic	Henry F. Ashurst	4,058	
Democratic	Eugene S. Ives	3,560	
Democratic	Eugene Brady O'Neill	2,964	
Democratic	Reese M. Ling	2,164	
Democratic	Harry L. Pickett	1,432	

United States Senate special election, 1911
Party	Candidate	Votes	%
Democratic	Mark Smith	10,598	
Democratic	Henry F. Ashurst	10,872	
Republican	Ralph H. Cameron	9,640	
Republican	Hoval Smith	9,228	

United States Senate, Democratic primary election, 1914
Party	Candidate	Votes	%
Democratic	Mark Smith	17,714	65.0
Democratic	Reese M. Ling	9,558	35.0

United States Senate general election, 1914
Party	Candidate	Votes	%
Democratic	Mark Smith	25,800	52.9
Republican	Don Lorenzo Hubbell	9,183	18.8
Prohibition	Eugene W. Chafin	7,293	15.0
Socialist	Bert Davis	3,852	7.9
Progressive	J. Bernard Nelson	2,608	5.4

United States Senate, Democratic primary election, 1920
Party	Candidate	Votes	%
Democratic	Mark Smith	10,910	37.0
Democratic	Rawghlie Clement Stanford	8,409	28.6
Democratic	Albinus A. Worsley	7,474	25.4
Democratic	John W. Norton	2,651	9.0

United States Senate general election, 1920
Party	Candidate	Votes	%
Republican	Ralph H. Cameron	35,893	55.2
Democratic	Mark Smith	29,169	44.8

== Footnotes ==
Party political offices
Preceded by First	Democratic nominee for U.S. Senator from Arizona (Class 3); 1912, 1914, 1920	Succeeded by Carl Hayden
U.S. House of Representatives
Preceded by Curtis C. Bean	Delegate to the U.S. House of Representatives from Arizona Territory; 1887–1895	Succeeded by Nathan O. Murphy
Preceded by Nathan O. Murphy	Delegate to the U.S. House of Representatives from Arizona Territory; 1897–1899	Succeeded by John F. Wilson
Preceded by John F. Wilson	Delegate to the U.S. House of Representatives from Arizona Territory; 1901–1903	Succeeded by John F. Wilson
Preceded by John F. Wilson	Delegate to the U.S. House of Representatives from Arizona Territory; 1905–1909	Succeeded by Ralph H. Cameron
U.S. Senate
New seat	United States Senator (Class 3) from Arizona; 1912–1921; Served alongside: Henry F. Ashurst	Succeeded by Ralph H. Cameron
