= 1914 United States Senate election in Arizona =

- November 3, 1914
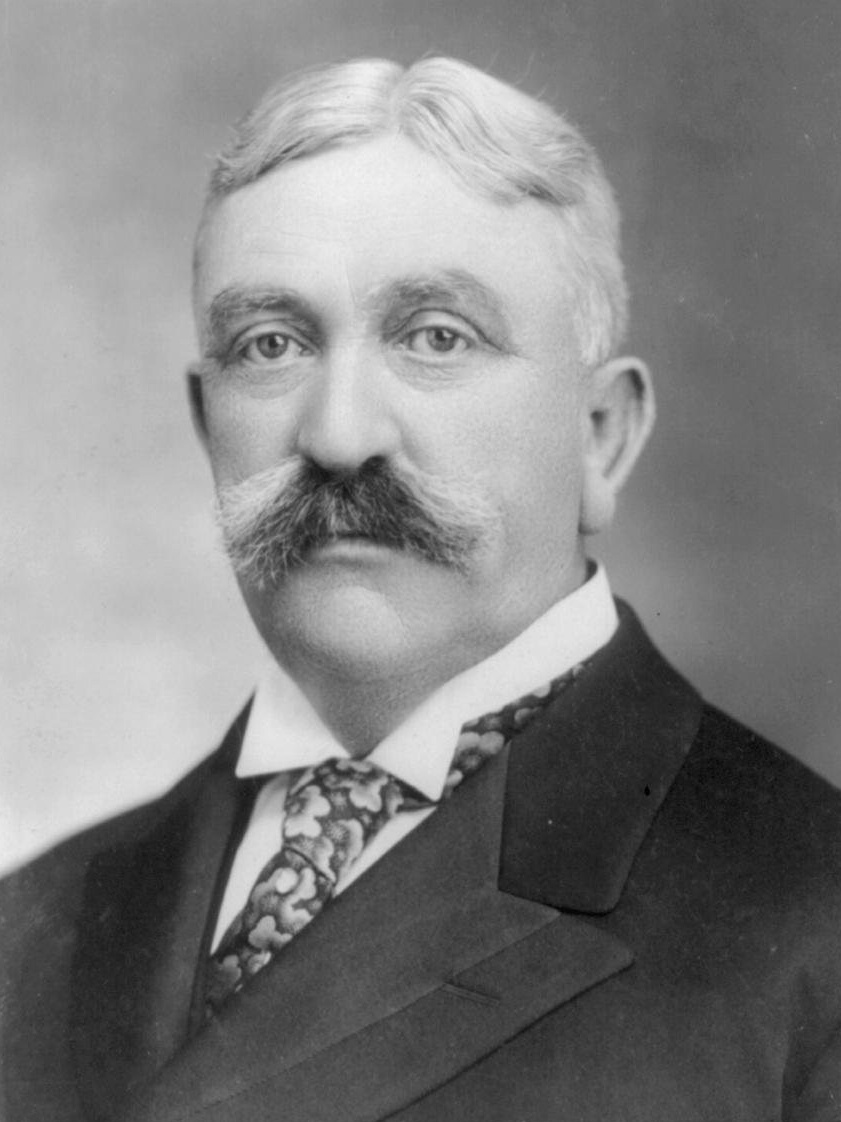

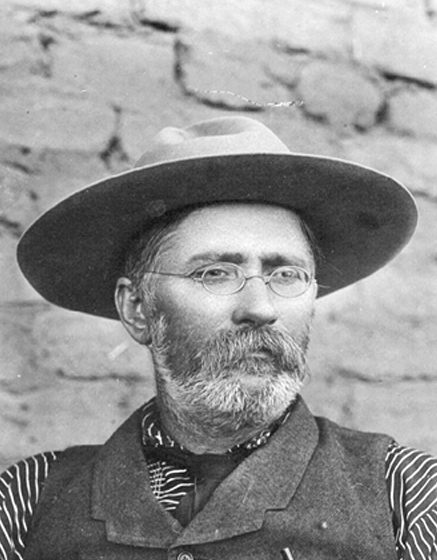

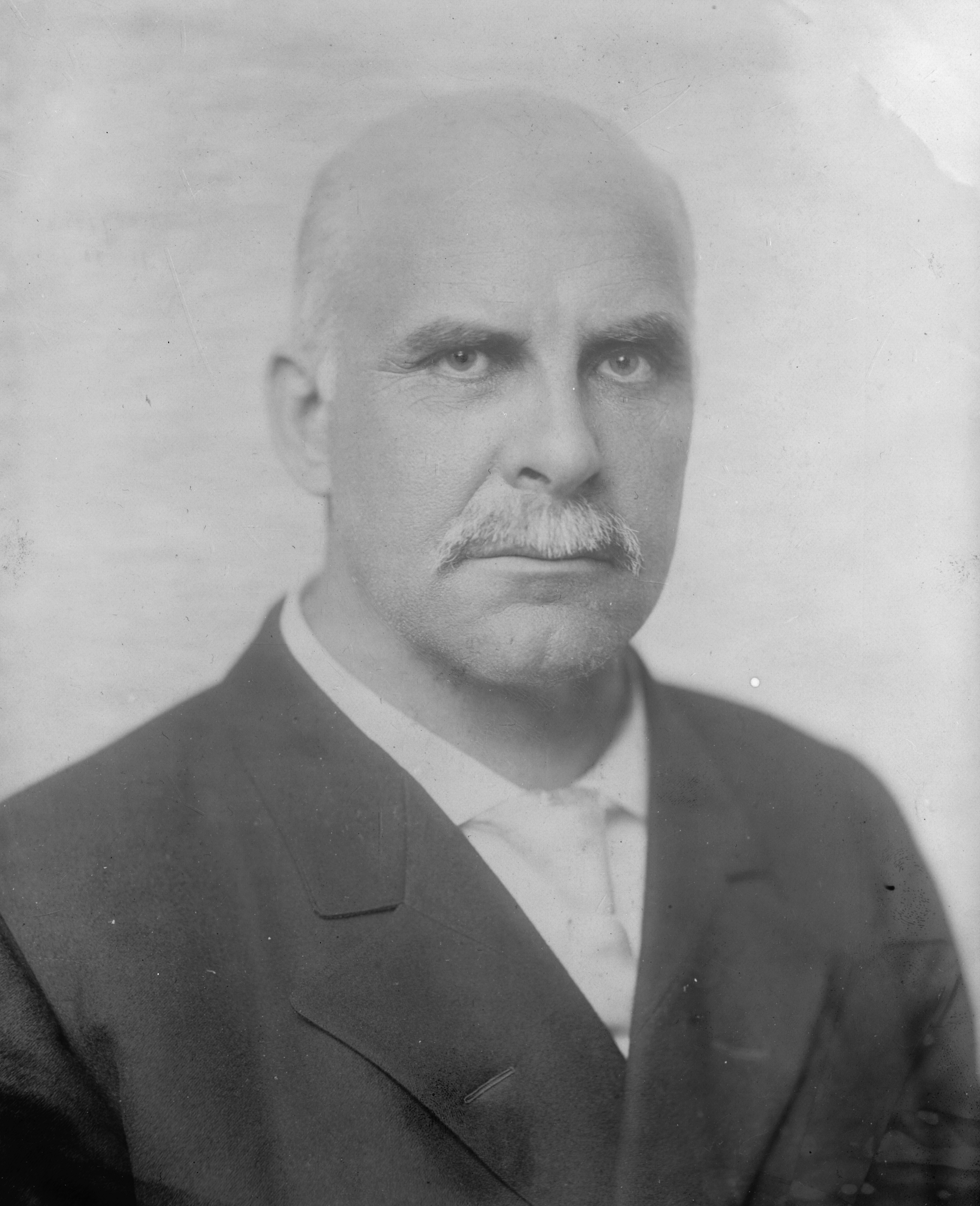
| Nominee | Marcus A. Smith | Don Lorenzo Hubbell | Eugene W. Chafin |
| Party | Democratic | Republican | Independent |
| Popular vote | 25,800 | 9,183 | 7,293 |
| Percentage | 53.23% | 18.95% | 15.05% |
| Nominee | Bert Davis | J. Bernard Nelson |
| Party | Socialist | Progressive |
| Popular vote | 3,582 | 2,608 |
| Percentage | 7.39% | 5.38% |
- County results Smith: 40–50% 50–60% 60–70%
U.S. senator before election
Marcus A. Smith
Democratic
Elected U.S. Senator
Marcus A. Smith
Democratic

The 1914 United States Senate election in Arizona was held on Tuesday November 3, Incumbent United States Senator Marcus Aurelius Smith was reelected to a second term defeating state senator Don Lorenzo Hubbell, the Republican nominee, in the general election by a wide margin. Several third-party candidates also ran in the election including former Prohibition Party presidential candidate Eugene W. Chafin, Socialist nominee Bert Davis Socialist, and Progressive nominee J. Bernard Nelson.

== Democratic primary ==
=== Candidates ===
- Marcus A. Smith, incumbent U.S. Senator since 1912
- Reese M. Ling, attorney

=== Results ===
Democratic primary results
| Party | Candidate | Votes | % |
|---|---|---|---|
| Democratic | Marcus A. Smith | 17,714 | 64.95% |
| Democratic | Reese M. Ling | 9,558 | 35.05% |
| Total votes | | 27,272 | 100.00 |

== Republican primary ==
=== Candidates ===
- Don Lorenzo Hubbell, State Senator

== General election ==
United States Senate election in Arizona, 1914
| Party | Candidate | Votes | % | ±% |
|---|---|---|---|---|
| Democratic | Marcus A. Smith (incumbent) | 25,800 | 53.23% | |
| Republican | Don Lorenzo Hubbell | 9,183 | 18.95% | |
| Independent | Eugene W. Chafin | 7,293 | 15.05% | |
| Socialist | Bert Davis | 3,582 | 7.39% | |
| Progressive | J. Bernard Nelson | 2,608 | 5.38% | |
| Majority | | 16,617 | 34.28% | |
| Turnout | | 48,466 | | |
| Democratic hold | | Swing | | |

== See also ==
- 1914 United States Senate elections
