= Arizona Territory's at-large congressional district =

Former congressional district

Coordinates: 34.05°N 111.09°W

- Obsolete district
- Created: 1864, as a non-voting delegate was granted by Congress
- Eliminated: 1912, as a result of statehood
- Years active: 1864–1912

Until statehood in 1912, Arizona Territory was represented in the United States House of Representatives by a non-voting delegate.

== List of delegates representing the district ==
Delegate	Party	Years	Cong ress	Electoral history
District created in 1864
Charles Debrille Poston (Tubac)	Republican	December 5, 1864 – March 3, 1865	38th	Elected in 1864. Lost re-election.
Vacant		March 4, 1865 – January 17, 1866	39th	Election was held late and Goodwin took months to arrive in Washington.
John Noble Goodwin (Prescott)	Republican	January 17, 1866 – March 3, 1867	39th	Elected September 6, 1865. Retired.
Coles Bashford (Tucson)	Independent (Note: Bashford, a Republican, was elected as an independent in 1866 with the support of the "federal ring," the faction composed of federal appointees led by territorial governor Richard C. McCormick.)	March 4, 1867 – March 3, 1869	40th	Elected in 1866. Retired to become Secretary of State of Arizona Territory.
Richard C. McCormick (Tucson)	Union (Note: McCormick deliberately avoided partisan labels during his tenure in territorial politics and was elected as a nonpartisan "Union" candidate in 1868.)	March 4, 1869 – March 3, 1875	41st 42nd 43rd	Elected June 3, 1868. Re-elected November 8, 1870. Re-elected November 8, 1872. Retired.
Hiram Sanford Stevens (Tucson)	Democratic	March 4, 1875 – March 3, 1879	44th 45th	Elected in 1874. Re-elected in 1876. Lost re-election.
John G. Campbell (Prescott)	Democratic	March 4, 1879 – March 3, 1881	46th	Elected in 1878. Retired.
G. H. Oury (Florence)	Democratic	March 4, 1881 – March 3, 1885	47th 48th	Elected in 1880. Re-elected in 1882. Retired.
Curtis Coe Bean (Prescott)	Republican	March 4, 1885 – March 3, 1887	49th	Elected in 1884. Lost re-election.
Marcus A. Smith (Tombstone)	Democratic	March 4, 1887 – March 3, 1895	50th 51st 52nd 53rd	Elected in 1886. Re-elected in 1888. Re-elected in 1890. Re-elected in 1892. Lost re-election.
Oakes Murphy (Phoenix)	Republican	March 4, 1895 – March 3, 1897	54th	Elected in 1894. Retired.
Marcus A. Smith (Tucson)	Democratic	March 4, 1897 – March 3, 1899	55th	Elected in 1896. Retired.
John Frank Wilson (Prescott)	Democratic	March 4, 1899 – March 3, 1901	56th	Elected in 1898. Retired.
Marcus A. Smith (Tucson)	Democratic	March 4, 1901 – March 3, 1903	57th	Elected in 1900. Retired.
John Frank Wilson (Prescott)	Democratic	March 4, 1903 – March 3, 1905	58th	Elected in 1902. Retired.
Marcus A. Smith (Tucson)	Democratic	March 4, 1905 – March 3, 1909	59th 60th	Elected in 1904.Re-elected in 1906. Lost re-election.
Ralph H. Cameron (Flagstaff)	Republican	March 4, 1909 – February 18, 1912	61st 62nd	Re-elected in 1908. Served until statehood.
District eliminated in 1912

== Bibliography ==
- —— (1985). Arizona Territorial Officials Volume III: The Delegates to Congress 1863–1912. Cave Creek, Arizona: Black Mountain Press. OCLC 12559708.
- Wagoner, Jay J. (1970). Arizona Territory 1863–1912: A Political History. Tucson: University of Arizona Press. ISBN 0-8165-0176-9.
- "Our Campaigns - United States - Territory of Arizona - AZ Territorial Delegate". www.ourcampaigns.com.
- "Biographical Directory of the U.S. Congress - Retro Search". bioguideretro.congress.gov.
