= John Frank Wilson =

Arizona politician (1846–1911)

Delegate to the U.S. House of Representatives from Arizona Territory
- In office March 4, 1903 – March 3, 1905
- Preceded by: Marcus A. Smith
- Succeeded by: Marcus A. Smith
- In office March 4, 1899 – March 3, 1901
- Preceded by: Marcus A. Smith
- Succeeded by: Marcus A. Smith

Member of the Arkansas House of Representatives
- In office 1877–1878

Personal details
- Born: May 7, 1846 Pulaski, Tennessee, U.S.
- Died: April 7, 1911 (aged 64) Prescott, Arizona Territory
- Party: Democratic
- Education: Rhuhama (Alabama) College

Military service
- Allegiance: Confederate States of America
- Branch/service: Confederate States Army
- Rank: lieutenant colonel
- Unit: Company B, First Battalion, Volunteer Infantry

John Frank Wilson (May 7, 1846 – April 7, 1911) was a Delegate from the Territory of Arizona.

Born near Pulaski, Tennessee, Wilson moved with his parents to Alabama and attended the common schools and Rhuhama (Alabama) College. He served in the Confederate States Army as a member of Company B, First Battalion, Volunteer Infantry, and later on staff duty under General Hindman until 1863, after which he served as lieutenant colonel of a regiment. He studied law and was admitted to the bar in 1866 and commenced practice in Fayetteville, Arkansas. He served as member of the Arkansas House of Representatives in 1877 and 1878. He served as prosecuting attorney for the fourth judicial district in 1885 and 1886.

Wilson moved to the Territory of Arizona and settled in Prescott in 1887, where he continued the practice of law. He served as member of the constitutional convention in 1891. He was probate judge of Yavapai County 1893–1895. He served as delegate to the Democratic National Convention in 1896. He was appointed attorney general of the Territory of Arizona by Governor Franklin and served during 1896 and 1897.

Wilson was elected as a Democrat to the Fifty-sixth Congress (March 4, 1899 – March 3, 1901). Wilson was elected to the Fifty-eighth Congress (March 4, 1903 – March 3, 1905). He was not a candidate for renomination in 1900 and 1904. Afterwards he resumed the practice of his profession. He died in Prescott, Arizona, and was interred in Mountain View Cemetery.

== Sources ==
- United States Congress. "John Frank Wilson (id: W000599)". Biographical Directory of the United States Congress.

U.S. House of Representatives
Preceded by Marcus A. Smith	Delegate to the U.S. House of Representatives from Arizona Territory; 1899–1901	Succeeded by Marcus A. Smith
Preceded by Marcus A. Smith	Delegate to the U.S. House of Representatives from Arizona Territory; 1903–1905	Succeeded by Marcus A. Smith
