= Curtis Coe Bean =

American politician (1828–1904)

Delegate to the U.S. House of Representatives from Arizona Territory
- In office March 4, 1885 – March 4, 1887
- Preceded by: Granville Henderson Oury
- Succeeded by: Marcus A. Smith

Personal details
- Born: January 4, 1828 Tamworth, New Hampshire, U.S.
- Died: February 1, 1904 (aged 76) New York City, U.S.
- Party: Republican
- Spouse: Mary Margaret Bradshaw

Curtis Coe "C. C." Bean (January 4, 1828 – February 1, 1904) was an American businessman and politician. Politically he served one term as Arizona Territory's Congressional delegate as well as a member of the Tennessee House of Representatives and Arizona Territorial Legislature. He had a number of business interests over the course of his life but is best known for mining interests.

== Early life and education ==
Bean was born to Josiah J. and Olive (Sanborn) Bean on January 4, 1828 in Tamworth, New Hampshire. His father died while he was young and Bean relocated to Gilmanton, New Hampshire with his mother in 1837. He received his education at Phillips Exeter Academy and Union College.

== Early career ==
In the mid-1850s, Bean moved to New York City where he obtained a job at the custom house. In addition to his job, Bean was involved with the brokerage business and read law. He was admitted to the bar but rarely practiced law. Bean had enough financial success that by 1859 he was able to donate $2,500 for creation of a private railroad. During the American Civil War, Bean was the clerk of the New York City school board.

== Career ==
During 1864 Bean moved to Columbia, Tennessee. From there he went to Nashville, Tennessee. During 1867 and 1868, Bean served as a member of the Tennessee House of Representatives. Bean married Mary Margaret Bradshow. The couple had three daughters: Mary, Grace, and Blanche.

Bean and his wife moved to Arizona Territory in June 1868, settling in Prescott. By October, he had opened a business office and was selling grain to the military. Bean sold corn to the military for 8¢/pound while buying it from local farmers for 7 1/2¢/pound in gold. By 1872, his operations had expanded to the point he purchased 800,000 pounds (360,000 kg) of corn from New Mexico Territory at 6 1/2¢/pound and transported it to Arizona via a 33‑day journey by ox cart. In addition to Anglo settlers, Bean attempted to employ the indigenous population. In 1873, he advertised for any Indian "willing to work and earn an honest dollar" while searching for laborers to cut hay for Fort Verde. At the same time Bean promised to provide free vegetables if he was awarded a contract to operate a farm near Fort McDowell. In addition to hay and grain, Bean operated a ranch near Fort Verde and a sutler store. He was known to import items from St. Louis, Missouri to avoid the higher prices charged in San Francisco, California.

Mining became Bean's primary business interest. After visiting a mine for the first time in January 1869, Bean began to acquire mining claims and was shipping thousands of pounds of silver ore to San Francisco by 1870. This was expanded to include several milling operations along with the acquisition and sales of mining equipment. Some of Bean's mining interests were held in the name of just him and his wife while others were held by partnerships. Among the people with which Bean partnered were John C. Frémont, Charles Silent, and Thomas Fitch. In 1880, Bean began branching out into copper mining. He acquired an extensive portfolio of copper mines before selling most of them to Phelps Dodge.

Politically, Bean made his first attempt to be elected Territorial Delegate in 1874. He lost the election to Hiram Sanford Stevens by a vote of 1,076 to 1,442. The race saw several abnormalities including the disqualification of 650 Bean votes by the Yavapai County Board of Supervisors which had come from the Little Colorado and Lower Lynx Creek precincts. Witnesses testified that no election had been held at the Lower Lynx Creek precinct. The Little Colorado precinct has returned 385 votes to the county seat despite witnesses claiming only 106 ballots being cast. Bean announced his intention to run for Territorial Delegate again on April 29, 1876 but withdrew his candidacy that year after being accidentally shot with his own weapon a month later.

In 1878, Bean decided to run for a seat in the territorial legislature and was elected to a council (upper house) seat during the 1879 session. During the session, he lobbied for creation of the office of territorial mineralogist. Governor Fremont had proposed this position, which might have had a salary as much as $3000/year, with the possibility that the Governor might hold the newly created office in addition to his position as governor. Friends lobbied for Bean to run to become mayor of Prescott in 1880. The matter was dropped when it was realized that Bean's home being located outside of city limits made him ineligible for the position.

Bean ran again for Territorial Delegate in 1884. Nominated during the territorial Republican convention on September 15, he ran on a platform that mirrored the national party platform but added a call for territorial officials to be selected from territorial residents, free public education, increased territorial control of land grants to the railroads, and reductions in the size of Indian reservations and amount spent on Indians. The Democratic challenger as Cotesworth Pinckney Head, a prominent Prescott merchant. Bean won the election by a vote of 6,747 to 5,595.

Upon his arrival to the United States Congress, Bean was assigned to the United States House Committee on Mines and Mining. As a delegate, Bean secured a right of way for the Southern Pacific Railroad through the Maricopa and Pima Indian reservations. This allowed the railroad to build a spur from its main line at Maricopa to Phoenix. He was unsuccessful however in efforts to block the Harrison Act of 1886 which limited the territorial legislature's ability to grant subsidies to railroads and incur additional territorial debt. Other proposals by Bean included a reward for the capture or killing of Geronimo, adding another judge to the territorial supreme court, and incentives for creation of artesian wells.

Republican's unanimously renominated Bean for a second term in 1886. The territorial platform criticized the Cleveland administration for being too pro-Wall Street, called for Union Army veterans to be given a pension, and called for a prohibition on Chinese immigration. Bean was defeated by the Democratic challenger, Marcus A. Smith, 4,472 to 6,355.

== Death ==
After leaving office, Bean returned to his mining interests in Arizona. He was seen as a potential candidate for governor in 1889 but withdrew his name due to his wife's displeasure with life on the frontier and growing financial concerns. Bean moved to New York City in 1890 but maintained a legal address in Arizona. He remained his home in New York for the rest of his life but made numerous trips westward to look after his business interests. Bean died on February 1, 1904. His body was buried in Brooklyn's Green-Wood Cemetery.

U.S. House of Representatives
Preceded by Granville Henderson Oury	Delegate to the U.S. House of Representatives from Arizona Territory; 1885–1887	Succeeded by Marcus A. Smith
