= United States House Committee on Territories =

The United States House Committee on Territories was a committee of the United States House of Representatives from 1825 to 1946 (19th to 79th Congresses). Its jurisdiction was reporting on a variety of topics related to the territories, including legislation concerning them, and their admission as new states.

== History ==
The United States House Committee on Territories was established on December 13, 1825. It was established with the power to look into the legislative, civil, and criminal proceedings of any of the Territories, and to devise and report to the House decisions that may be necessary to secure the rights and privileges of residents and nonresidents. However, in 1880 the House ruled that the committee had additional jurisdiction of all subjects relating to territorial legislation, the revision of legislation in territories, or the admission of states.

Over its lifetime the committee reported legislation that affected the structure, status or power of the territorial governments, statehood, the power of municipalities, and boundary disputes. Additionally on public land in territories they had authority over railroads, public works and buildings, highways, taxes, bond issuing, education, Indian control, prohibition and wildlife.

Petitions of the 62nd through 79th Congresses (1911-46) relate almost exclusively to Alaska and Hawaii. The petitions from Alaska concerned issues of self-governance, transportation, coal, fisheries, forest reserves, interstate commerce, wagon roads and trails, new land districts, disposition of public moneys from sales of public lands for road and school funds, health regulations, aid for destitute whites, medical and sanitary relief for Alaskan Indians and natives, aids to navigation, land surveys, railways and conservation. Requests for statehood and for distribution of public lands dominated the petitions made by Hawaii.
