= 2018 United States Senate election in Arizona =

- November 6, 2018
- Turnout: 64.85% ▲
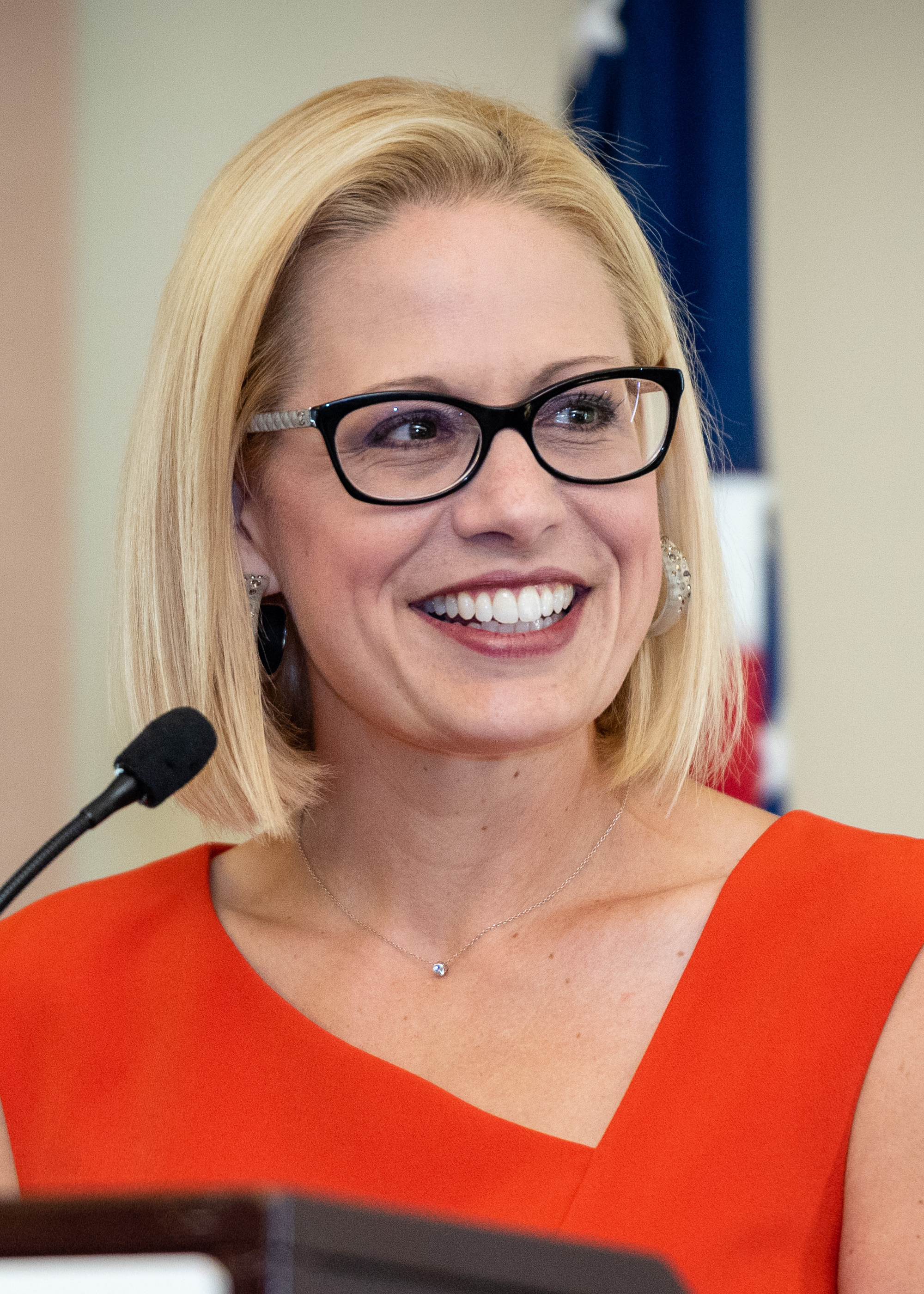

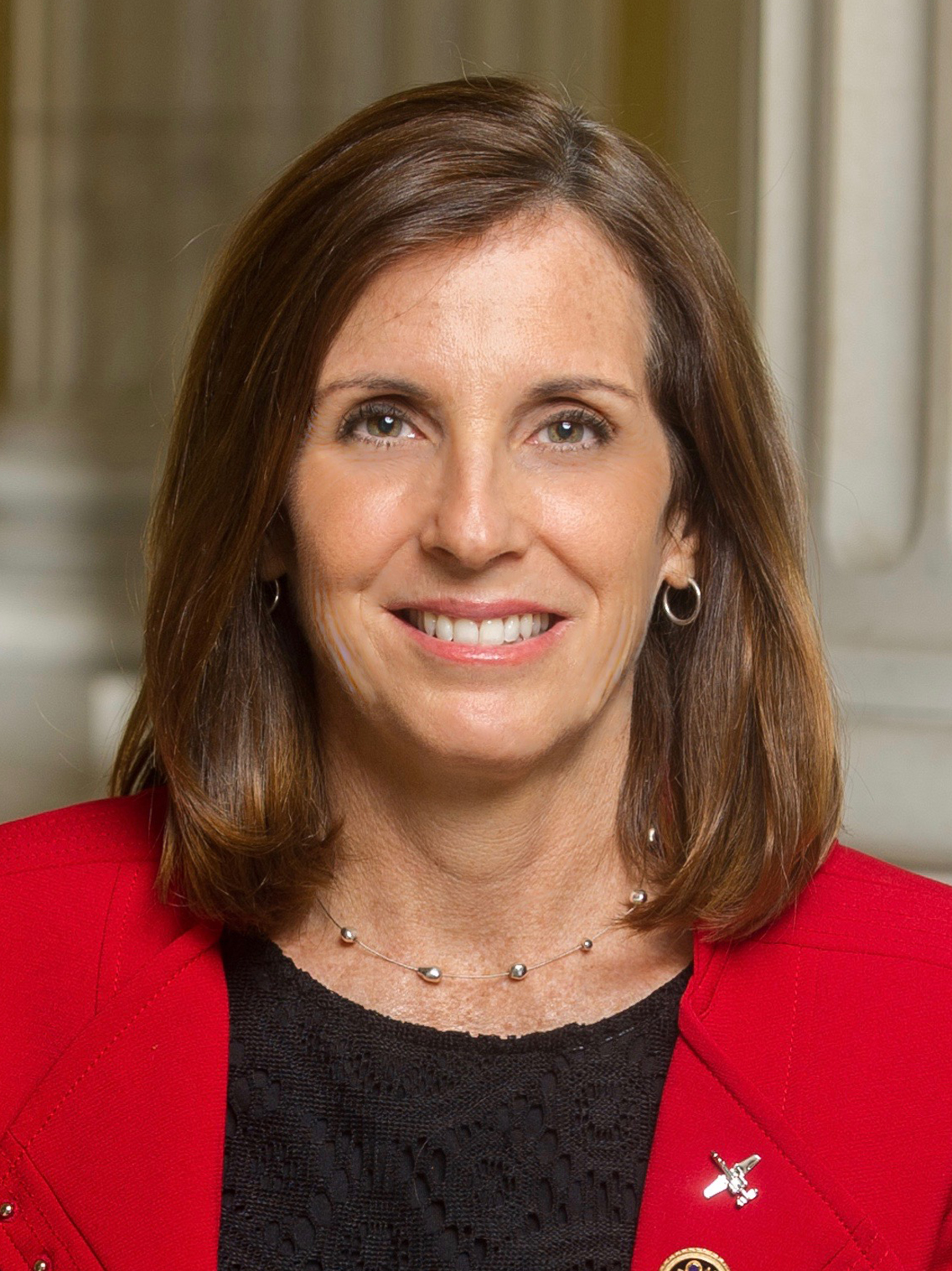
Nominee	Kyrsten Sinema	Martha McSally
Party	Democratic	Republican
Popular vote	1,191,100	1,135,200
Percentage	49.96%	47.61%
- Sinema: 40–50% 50–60% 60–70% 70–80% 80–90% >90% McSally: 40–50% 50–60% 60–70% 70–80% 80–90% >90% No data
U.S. senator before election
Jeff Flake
Republican
Elected U.S. Senator
Kyrsten Sinema
Democratic

The 2018 United States Senate election in Arizona took place on November 6, 2018. Incumbent Republican Senator Jeff Flake did not seek a second term. The election was held concurrently with a gubernatorial election, other elections to the U.S. Senate, elections to the U.S. House of Representatives, and various other state and local elections.

Primaries were held on August 28, 2018, three days after the death of longtime U.S. Senator John McCain. Martha McSally won the Republican nomination, while Kyrsten Sinema won the Democratic nomination. Green Party candidate Angela Green was also on the ballot, but ended her campaign and endorsed Sinema before Election Day.

The Associated Press called the race for Sinema on November 12, 2018, and McSally conceded that day. Sinema became the first Democrat to win a U.S. Senate seat in Arizona since 1988. McSally was subsequently appointed by Governor Doug Ducey to the other vacant Senate seat in Arizona, left open after McCain's death and then held on an interim basis by Jon Kyl.

== Background ==
Arizona, located along the United States border with Mexico, has a unique political history. Upon its admission to the Union in 1912, the state was dominated by Democrats who had migrated there from the South, and aside from the landslide victories of Republicans Warren G. Harding, Calvin Coolidge, and Herbert Hoover, the state voted for Democrats until 1952, when Dwight Eisenhower carried it, and began a lengthy streak of Republican victories interrupted only by Bill Clinton's narrow victory in 1996. Since then, the state had remained Republican, and was won by Donald Trump with a 3.5% margin in 2016, although Trump's margin of victory was much smaller than that of past Republican presidential nominees.

Incumbent Republican Senator Jeff Flake announced in October 2017 that he would retire at the end of his current term instead of seeking reelection for another term in 2018. Flake had previously indicated his intent to run for reelection in March 2017. However, he was considered vulnerable due to persistently low approval ratings, a poor relationship with President Trump, and the threat of a primary challenge from former state senator Kelli Ward, who promised to run on a more pro-Trump platform. Additionally, he had won his first term in 2012 by only 3 percentage points, even though Republican presidential nominee Mitt Romney won Arizona by 9.

== Republican primary ==
=== Candidates ===
==== On the ballot ====
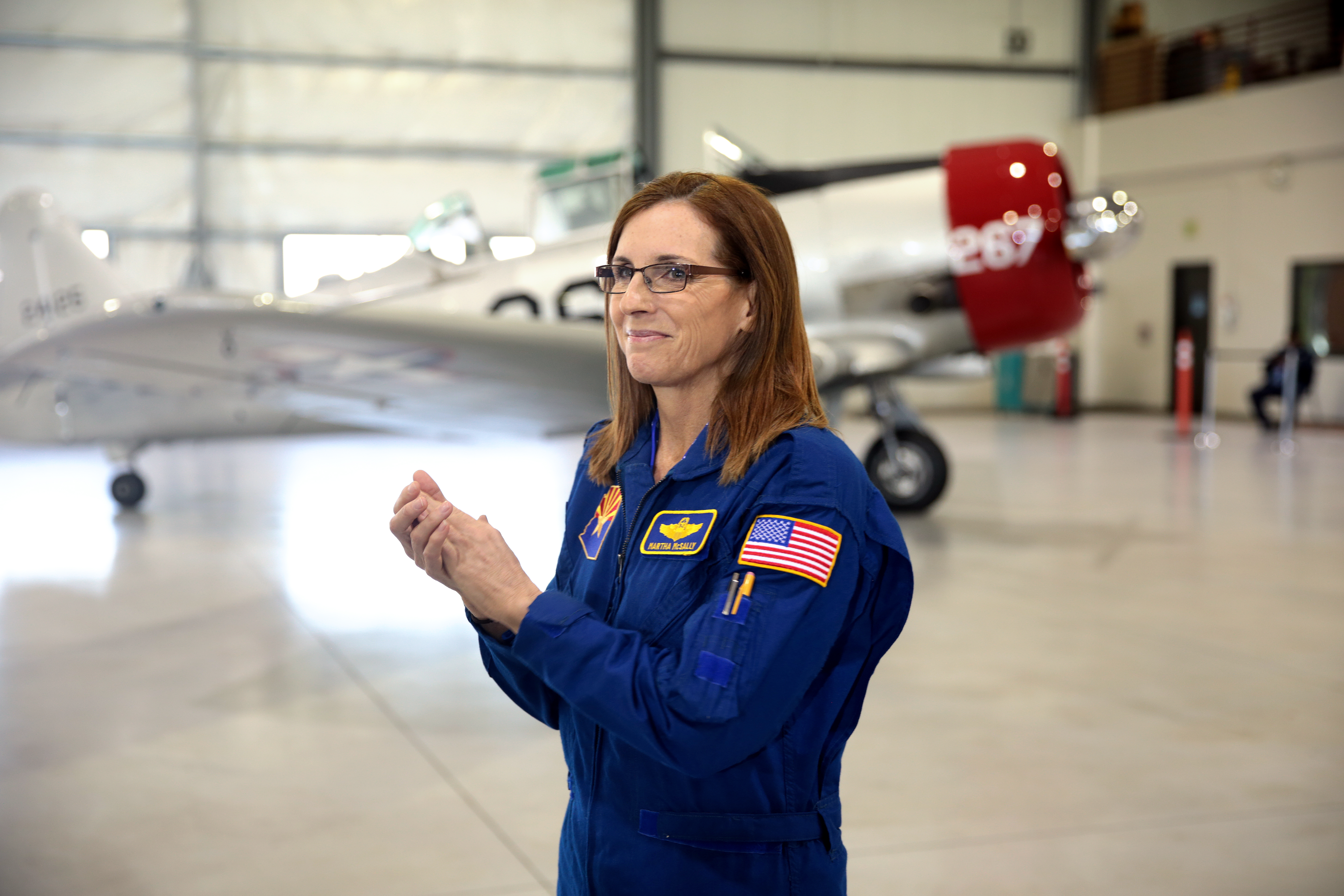
U.S. Representative Martha McSally at the launch of her senatorial bid in January 2018

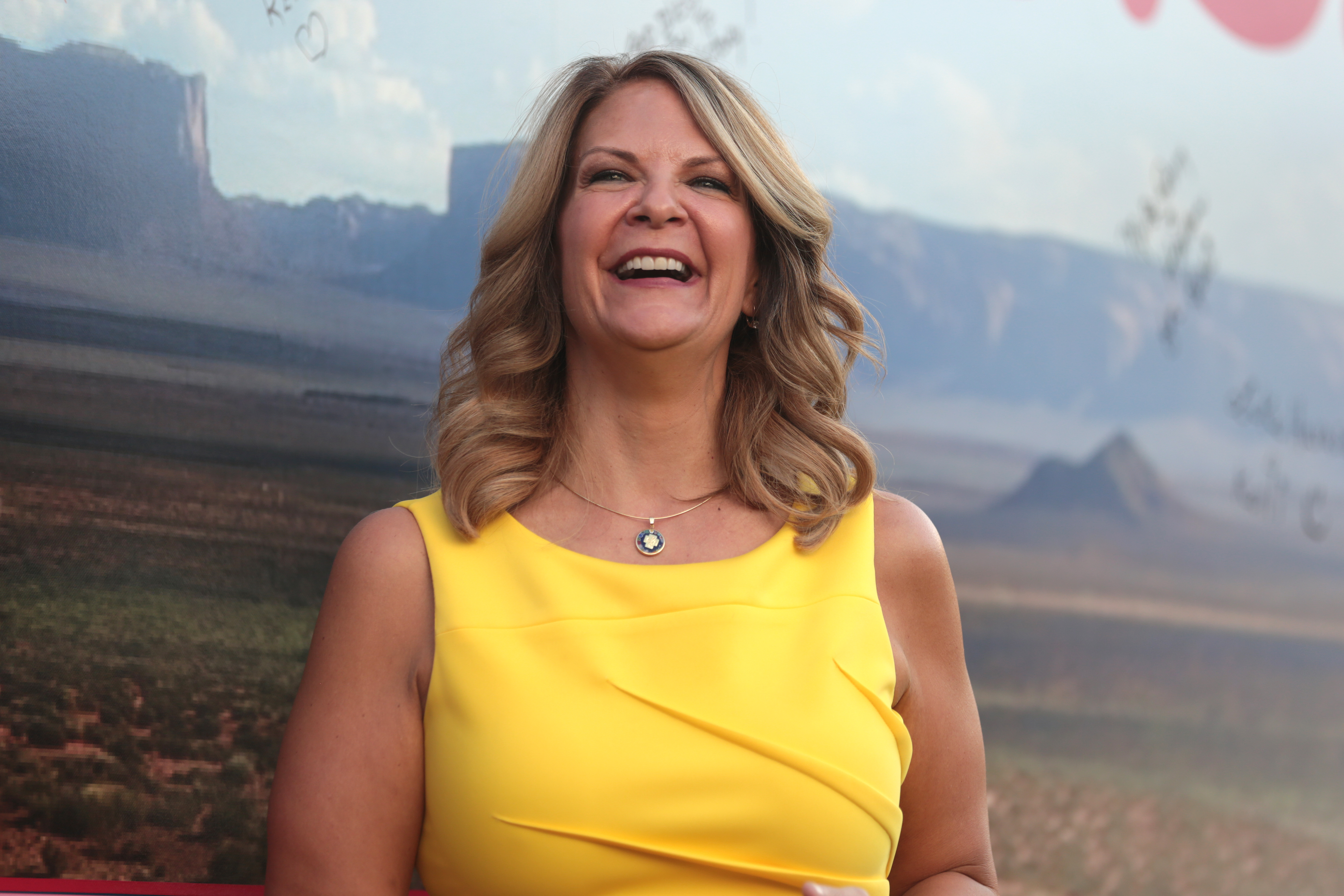
Former State Senator Kelli Ward at a campaign event prior to the Republican primary in August 2018

- Joe Arpaio, former Maricopa County sheriff
- Nicholas N. Glenn (write-in candidate)
- William Gonzales (write-in candidate)
- Martha McSally, U.S. representative from Arizona's 2nd congressional district and retired U.S. Air Force Colonel
- Kelli Ward, former state senator and candidate for the U.S. Senate in 2016

==== Failed to file ====
- Craig Brittain, owner and co-founder of the revenge porn website IsAnybodyDown?
- Christian "C.J." Diegel, financial advisor
- Michelle Griffin
- Shawn Redd
- Nicholas Tutora, pharmacist

==== Withdrew ====
- Jeff Flake, incumbent U.S. senator

==== Declined ====
- Andy Biggs, U.S. representative from Arizona's 5th congressional district (ran for re-election)
- Jan Brewer, former governor of Arizona
- Mark Brnovich, attorney general of Arizona (ran for re-election)
- Jeff DeWit, treasurer of Arizona (nominated as NASA chief financial officer)
- Trent Franks, former U.S. representative
- Paul Gosar, U.S. representative from Arizona's 4th congressional district (ran for re-election)
- Robert Graham, former chair of the Arizona Republican Party
- Christine Jones, former GoDaddy executive, candidate for governor in 2014 and candidate for AZ-05 in 2016
- Bill Montgomery, Maricopa County Attorney
- Ben Quayle, former U.S. representative and son of former Vice President Dan Quayle
- Matt Salmon, former U.S. representative and nominee for governor in 2002
- David Schweikert, U.S. representative from Arizona's 6th congressional district (ran for re-election)
- John Shadegg, former U.S. representative

=== Endorsements ===
Martha McSally

Federal officials

- Mike Pence, vice president of the United States

United States Senators

- Jon Kyl, twice U.S. Senator (R-AZ) and former Senate minority whip
- Mitch McConnell, U.S. Senator (R-KY) and Senate majority leader
- David Perdue, U.S. Senator (R-GA)

U.S. Representatives

- Newt Gingrich, former House speaker

State officials

- Betsey Bayless, former secretary of state of Arizona
- Jan Brewer, former governor of Arizona
- Jay Heiler, treasurer of the Arizona Board of Regents

Mayors

- Jim Lane (Scottsdale)
- Georgia Lord (Goodyear)

Individuals

- Suzanne Klapp, Scottsdale city councilwoman

Organizations

- Maggie's List
- National Border Patrol Council
- RightNOW Women
- Students For Trump
- Value in Electing Women (VIEW) PAC
- Winning for Women
Kelli Ward

U.S. Senators

- Rand Paul, U.S. senator (R-KY)

U.S. representatives

- Paul Gosar, U.S. representative (R-AZ)
- Steve King, U.S. representative (R-IA)
- Dana Rohrabacher, U.S. representative (R-CA)

Local officials

- Sylvia Allen, state senator
- Nancy Barto, state senator
- Sonny Borrelli, state senator
- David Farnsworth, state senator
- Mark Finchem, state representative
- Travis Grantham, state representative
- Gail Griffin, state senator
- Al Melvin, former state senator
- Becky Nutt, state representative
- Russell Pearce, former senate president
- Warren Petersen, state senator

U.S. military personnel

- Jessie Jane Duff, retired gunnery sergeant of the U.S. Marine Corps and activist

Individuals

- Steve Bannon, former White House Chief Strategist, executive chairman of Breitbart News
- Mike Cernovich, alt-right media personality and conspiracy theorist
- Sebastian Gorka, former Deputy Assistant to President Donald Trump
- Sean Hannity, conservative talk radio host and host of Hannity on the Fox News Network
- Laura Ingraham, conservative talk radio host and host of The Ingraham Angle on the Fox News Network
- Tomi Lahren, political commentator
- Austin Petersen, candidate for U.S. Senate in Missouri in 2018 and Libertarian candidate for president in 2016

Organizations

- Citizens For Trump
- Great America PAC
- Gun Owners of America

=== Polling ===
Poll source	Date(s) administered	Sample size	Margin of error	Joe Arpaio	Martha McSally	Kelli Ward	Other	Undecided
Data Orbital	August 21–22, 2018	600	± 4.0%	18%	48%	22%	1%	8%
OH Predictive Insights	August 14–15, 2018	578	± 4.1%	13%	47%	27%	–	12%
OH Predictive Insights	July 23–25, 2018	576	± 4.1%	15%	35%	27%	–	23%
Gravis Marketing	June 27 – July 2, 2018	501	± 4.4%	24%	36%	27%	–	14%
Emerson College	June 21–22, 2018	305	± 5.9%	18%	32%	19%	7%	23%
Data Orbital	June 19–21, 2018	550	± 4.2%	17%	38%	23%	2%	21%
Marist College	June 17–21, 2018	371	± 6.7%	21%	30%	28%	<1%	21%
OH Predictive Insights	June 11–12, 2018	600	± 4.0%	14%	39%	25%	–	22%
Remington (R) (Note: This poll was sponsored by McSally's campaign.)	May 23–24, 2018	2,011	± 2.3%	25%	42%	23%	–	10%
Magellan Strategies (R)	April 11–12 and 15, 2018	755	± 3.6%	26%	36%	25%	6%	7%
OH Predictive Insights	April 10–11, 2018	302	± 5.6%	22%	27%	36%	–	15%
Data Orbital	January 11–15, 2018	500	± 4.4%	22%	31%	19%	–	27%
OH Predictive Insights	January 9, 2018	504	± 4.4%	29%	31%	25%	–	15%
WPA Intelligence (R)	November 15–16, 2017	500	± 4.4%	–	38%	36%	–	26%
OH Predictive Insights	November 9, 2017	323	± 5.5%	–	34%	42%	–	24%
Revily (R) (Note: This poll was sponsored by Ward's campaign.)	October 28–31, 2017	380	± 3.0%	–	21%	32%	15%	34%

Hypothetical polling

with Jay Heiler

Poll source	Date(s) administered	Sample size	Margin of error	Jay Heiler	Martha McSally	Matt Salmon	David Schweikert	John Shadegg	Kelli Ward	Undecided
Data Orbital	October 26–28, 2017	500	± 4.4%	1%	19%	10%	5%	4%	26%	28%

with Jeff Flake

Poll source	Date(s) administered	Sample size	Margin of error	Jeff Flake	Jeff DeWit	Nicholas Tutora	Kelli Ward	Other	Undecided
GBA Strategies	August 30 – September 7, 2017	500	± 4.4%	31%	–	–	58%	–	11%
JMC Analytics (R)	August 26–27, 2017	500	± 4.4%	21%	–	3%	47%	–	29%
HighGround Public Affairs	August 18–19, 2017	273	± 5.9%	28%	–	–	43%	5%	24%
Political Marketing International (R-Ward)	February 7, 2017	921	± 5.0%	23%	–	–	30%	–	47%
Remington Research Group	November 15–16, 2016	1,122	± 2.9%	30%	38%	–	15%	–	17%
Remington Research Group	November 15–16, 2016	1,122	± 2.9%	33%	42%	–	–	–	25%
Remington Research Group	November 15–16, 2016	1,122	± 2.9%	35%	35%	–	–	–	30%

=== Results ===
Results by county: McSally: 30–40%; 40–50%; 50–60%; 60–70%; Arpaio: 30–40%

Republican primary results
Party	Candidate	Votes	%
Republican	Martha McSally	357,626	54.57%
Republican	Kelli Ward	180,926	27.61%
Republican	Joe Arpaio	116,555	17.79%
Write-in		191	0.03%
Total votes		655,298	100.00%

== Democratic primary ==
=== Candidates ===
==== On the ballot ====
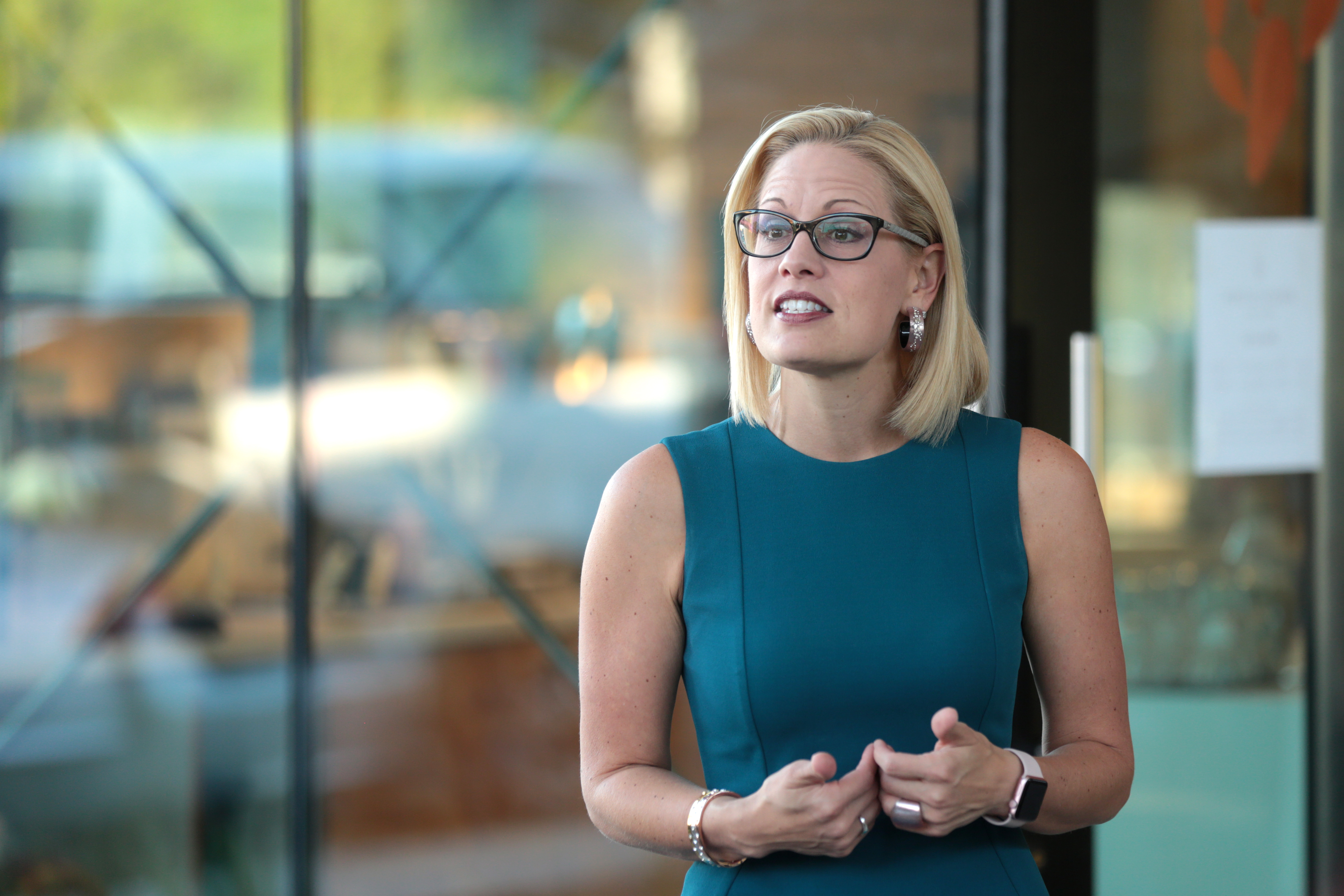
U.S. Representative Kyrsten Sinema at a campaign event in October 2018

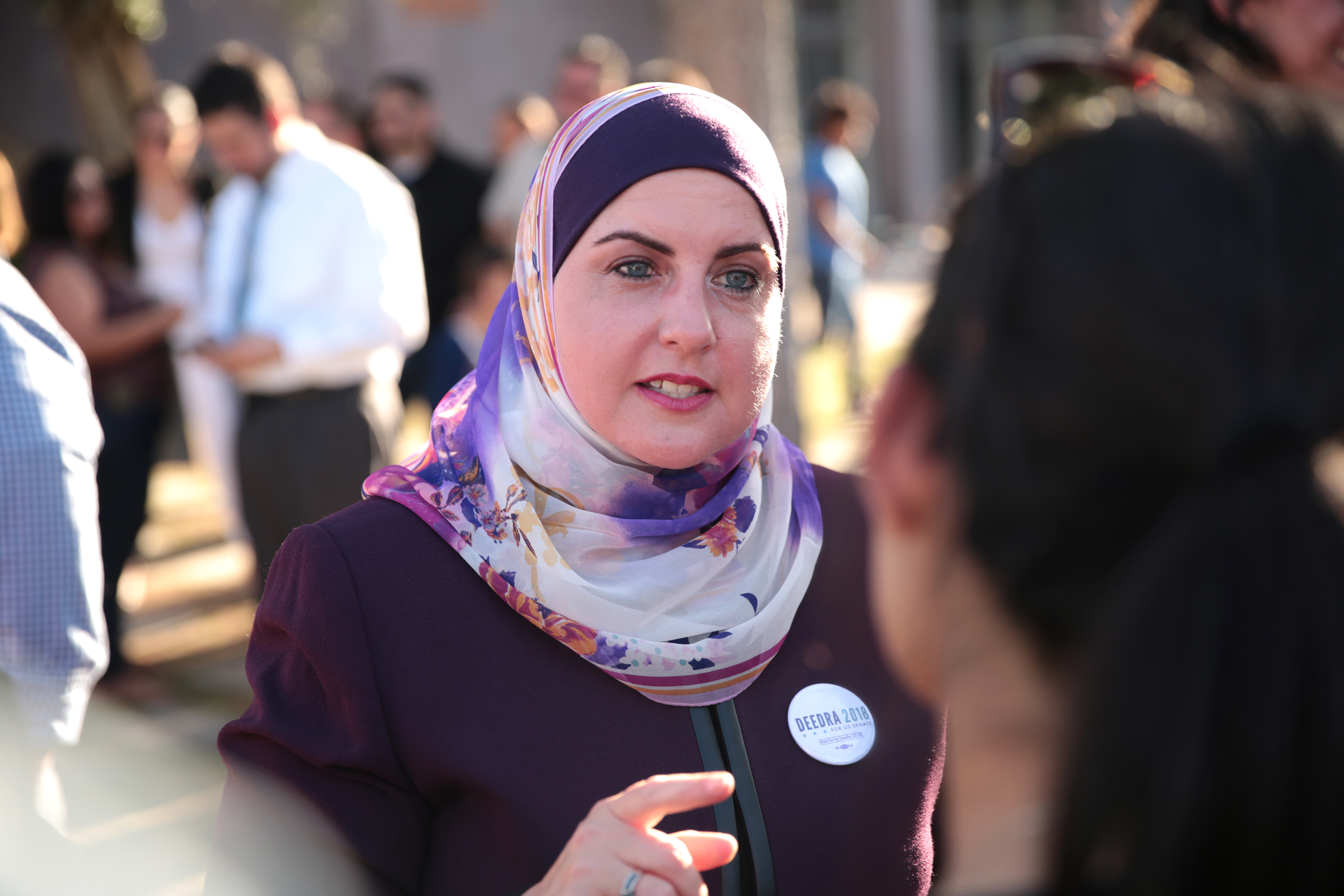
Attorney Deedra Abboud at a campaign event in April 2017

- Deedra Abboud, attorney
- Kyrsten Sinema, U.S. representative from Arizona's 9th congressional district

==== Failed to file ====
- Bob Bishop, pilot
- Matt Jette
- David Ruben, physician
- Chris Russell, attorney
- Richard Sherzan, retired administrative law judge, former Iowa state representative and candidate for the U.S. Senate in 2016

==== Withdrew ====
- Jim Moss, businessman, activist and former teacher

==== Declined ====
- Randall Friese, state representative
- Mark Kelly, astronaut, scientist, U.S. Navy captain and husband of former U.S. representative Gabby Giffords (later elected to Arizona's Class 3 Senate seat in 2020)
- Ann Kirkpatrick, former U.S. representative and nominee for the U.S. Senate in 2016 (ran for U.S. House)
- Greg Stanton, Mayor of Phoenix (ran for U.S. House)

=== Endorsements ===
Deedra Abboud

Organizations

- Alliance4Action
- Justice Democrats
- The People for Bernie Sanders
- Progressive Democrats of America
- Vote Pro Choice
Kyrsten Sinema

Federal officials

- Joe Biden, 47th Vice President of the United States and former U.S. Senator (D-DE)

U.S. senators

- Cory Booker, U.S. senator (D-NJ)
- Catherine Cortez Masto, U.S. senator (D-NV)
- Dennis DeConcini, former U.S. senator (D-AZ)
- Tammy Duckworth, U.S. senator (D-IL)
- Dick Durbin, U.S. senator (D-IL) and Senate Minority Whip
- Kirsten Gillibrand, U.S. senator (D-NY)
- Kamala Harris, U.S. senator (D-CA)
- Mazie Hirono, U.S. senator (D-HI)
- Amy Klobuchar, U.S. senator (D-MN)
- Patrick Leahy, U.S. senator (D-VT)
- Jeff Merkley, U.S. senator (D-OR)
- Chris Murphy, U.S. Senator (D-CT)
- Patty Murray, U.S. senator (D-WA)
- Gary Peters, U.S. Senator (D-MI)
- Chuck Schumer, U.S. senator (D-NY) and Senate Minority Leader
- Ron Wyden, U.S. senator (D-OR)

U.S. representatives

- Ron Barber, former U.S. representative (D-AZ)
- Ruben Gallego, U.S. representative (D-AZ)
- Joe Kennedy III, U.S. representative (D-MA)
- Harry Mitchell, former U.S. representative (D-AZ)
- Tom O'Halleran, U.S. representative (D-AZ)

State and local politicians

- Lela Alston, state representative
- Kelli Butler, state representative
- Andrea Dalessandro, state senator
- Coral Evans, Mayor of Flagstaff
- Randy Friese, state representative and assistant house minority leader
- Francisco Heredia, Mesa city councilmember
- Daniel Hernández Jr., state representative
- Katie Hobbs, state senator and Senate minority leader
- Robert Meza, state senator
- Mark Mitchell, mayor of Tempe
- Joel Navarro, Tempe city councilmember
- Lynne Pancrazi, Yuma County supervisor
- Laura Pastor, Phoenix City Councilmember
- Rebecca Rios, state representative and house minority leader
- Regina Romero, Tucson councilmember
- Jonathan Rothschild, mayor of Tucson
- Anna Tovar, mayor of Tolleson
- Daniel Valenzuela, Phoenix City Councilmember

Individuals

- Jon Favreau, co-host of progressive political podcast Pod Save America and former chief White House speechwriter for President Barack Obama
- Jason Kander, former Missouri Secretary of State, nominee for U.S Senate in Missouri in 2016, host of podcast Majority 54 and founder of Let America Vote
- Jenny Wilson, Salt Lake County Councilwoman; candidate for U.S. Senate in Utah (D-UT)

Labor unions

- Arizona Building and Construction Trades Council
- Arizona Education Association
- Arizona State AFL–CIO
- Communications Workers of America
- International Association of Sheet Metal, Air, Rail and Transportation Workers Local 359
- National Education Association
- United Food and Commercial Workers Local 99
- United Mine Workers of America

Organizations

- Chandler Chamber of Commerce
- Democratic Senatorial Campaign Committee
- EMILY's List
- End Citizens United
- Equality PAC
- Gay & Lesbian Victory Fund
- Human Rights Campaign
- League of Conservation Voters Action Fund
- Let America Vote
- LPAC
- Mesa Chamber of Commerce
- National Organization for Women
- Planned Parenthood Action Fund
- Stonewall Democrats of Arizona

=== Polling ===
Poll source	Date(s) administered	Sample size	Margin of error	Deedra Abboud	Kyrsten Sinema	Other	Undecided
Data Orbital	June 25–27, 2018	550	± 4.2%	7%	63%	2%	29%
Emerson College	June 21–22, 2018	260	± 6.2%	8%	51%	12%	30%

=== Results ===
Results by county: Sinema: 60–70%; 70–80%; 80–90%

Democratic primary results
Party	Candidate	Votes	%
Democratic	Kyrsten Sinema	404,170	79.25%
Democratic	Deedra Abboud	105,800	20.75%
Total votes		509,970	100.00%

== Libertarian primary ==
=== Candidates ===
==== Declared ====
- Adam Kokesh (write-in candidate), anti-war activist and U.S. presidential candidate in 2020

==== Removed ====
- Doug Marks, veteran and write-in candidate for IL-14 in 2010

== Green primary ==
=== Candidates ===
==== Declared ====
- Angela Green (write-in candidate)

==== Removed ====
- Eve Reyes-Aguirre, activist

==== Results ====
Results by county: Green: 90–100%; No votes

Green primary results
Party	Candidate	Votes	%
Green	Angela Green (write-in)	389	100.00%
Total votes		389	100.00%

== General election ==
=== Debates ===
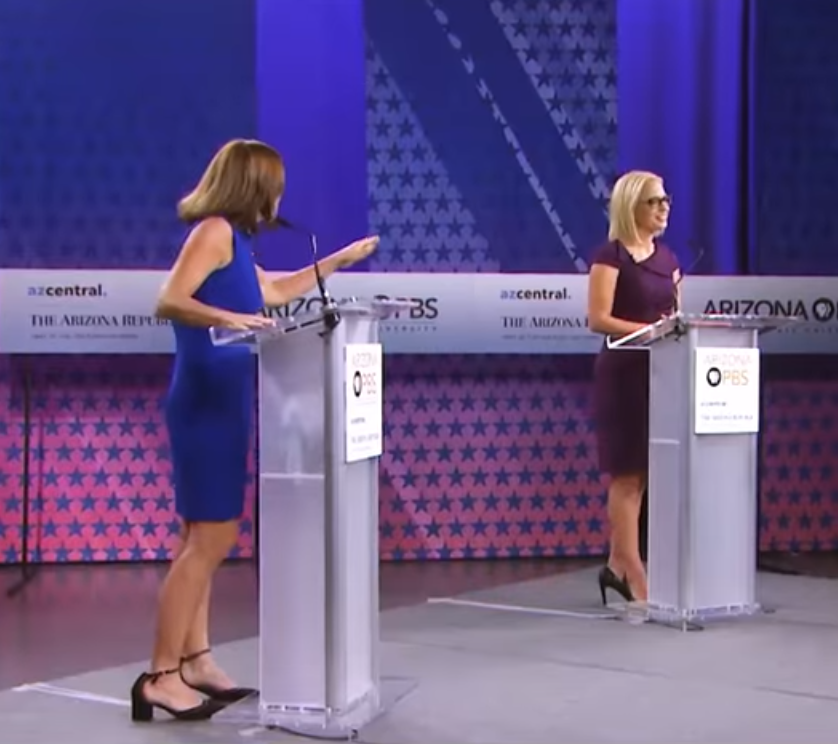
Sinema and McSally in a 2018 senatorial debate

- Complete video of debate, October 15, 2018

=== Predictions ===
Source	Ranking	As of
The Cook Political Report	Tossup	October 26, 2018
Inside Elections	Tilt D (flip)	November 1, 2018
Sabato's Crystal Ball	Lean D (flip)	November 5, 2018
CNN	Tossup	October 30, 2018
RealClearPolitics	Tossup	November 5, 2018
FiveThirtyEight	Lean D (flip)	November 6, 2018
Daily Kos	Tossup	October 26, 2018
Fox News	Tossup	October 30, 2018

=== Endorsements ===
Martha McSally (R)

U.S. executive branch Officials

- George W. Bush, 43rd president of the United States
- Betsy DeVos, United States secretary of education
- Mike Pence, 48th vice president of the United States
- Condoleezza Rice, former United States secretary of state
- Donald Trump, 45th president of the United States

U.S. Senators

- John Boozman, U.S. Senator (R-AR)
- Susan Collins, U.S. Senator (R-ME)
- Joni Ernst, U.S. Senator (R-IA)
- Lindsey Graham, U.S. Senator (R-SC)
- Jon Kyl, U.S. Senator (R-AZ) and former Senate Minority Whip
- Mitch McConnell, U.S. Senator (R-KY) and Senate Majority Leader
- David Perdue, U.S. Senator (R-GA)

U.S. representatives

- Liz Cheney, U.S. representative (R-WY) and daughter of former vice president Dick Cheney
- Newt Gingrich, former House speaker

Governors

- Jan Brewer, former governor of Arizona
- Doug Ducey, governor of Arizona
- Mitt Romney, former governor of Massachusetts and Republican nominee for president of the United States in 2012

State officials

- Betsey Bayless, former secretary of state of Arizona
- Karen Fann, state senator
- Jay Heiler, treasurer of the Arizona Board of Regents
- Steve Pierce, former state senator
- Tony Rivero, state representative
- Kelli Ward, former state senator

Local-level officials

- Jim Lane, Scottsdale mayor
- Bill Montgomery, Maricopa County attorney

Individuals

- Rudy Giuliani, former mayor of New York City
- Kimberly Guilfoyle, television news personality
- Donald Trump Jr., businessman and son of President Donald Trump

Organizations

- Citizens Against Government Waste
- Maggie's List
- National Border Patrol Council
- National Federation of Independent Business
- RightNOW Women
- Students For Trump

Newspapers

- The Daily Courier
- National Review
Kyrsten Sinema (D)

Former U.S. executive branch officials

- Joe Biden, 47th vice president of the United States and former U.S. senator (D-DE)
- Barack Obama, 44th president of the United States

U.S. senators

- Cory Booker, U.S. senator (D-NJ)
- Catherine Cortez Masto, U.S. senator (D-NV)
- Dennis DeConcini, former U.S. senator (D-AZ)
- Tammy Duckworth, U.S. senator (D-IL)
- Dick Durbin, U.S. senator (D-IL) and Senate Minority Whip
- Kirsten Gillibrand, U.S. senator (D-NY)
- Kamala Harris, U.S. senator (D-CA)
- Mazie Hirono, U.S. senator (D-HI)
- Amy Klobuchar, U.S. senator (DFL-MN)
- Patrick Leahy, U.S. senator (D-VT)
- Jeff Merkley, U.S. senator (D-OR)
- Chris Murphy, U.S. senator (D-CT)
- Patty Murray, U.S. senator (D-WA)
- Gary Peters, U.S. senator (D-MI)
- Brian Schatz, U.S. senator (D-HI)
- Chuck Schumer, U.S. senator (D-NY) and Senate Minority Leader
- Ron Wyden, U.S. senator (D-OR)

U.S. representatives

- Ron Barber, former U.S. representative (D-AZ)
- Ruben Gallego, U.S. representative (D-AZ)
- Joe Kennedy III, U.S. representative (D-MA)
- Conor Lamb, U.S. representative (D-PA)
- Harry Mitchell, former U.S. representative (D-AZ)
- Tom O'Halleran, U.S. representative (D-AZ)

State and local politicians

- Lela Alston, state representative
- Kelli Butler, state representative
- Andrea Dalessandro, state senator
- Randy Friese, state representative and state Assistant House Minority Leader
- Daniel Hernández Jr., state representative
- Katie Hobbs, state senator and Senate minority leader
- Robert Meza, state senator
- Lynne Pancrazi, Yuma County supervisor
- Rebecca Rios, state representative and House minority leader
- Jonathan Rothschild, mayor of Tucson
- Anna Tovar, mayor of Tolleson
- Grant Woods, former attorney general of Arizona (Republican)

Individuals

- Jon Favreau, co-host of progressive political podcast Pod Save America and former chief White House speechwriter for President Barack Obama
- Angela Green, small business owner, accountant and Green Party nominee for U.S. Senate in 2018
- Jason Kander, former Missouri Secretary of State, nominee for U.S Senate in Missouri in 2016, host of podcast Majority 54 and founder of Let America Vote
- Amy Schumer, actress
- Amy Siskind, activist and writer
- Jenny Wilson, Salt Lake County councilwoman; candidate for U.S. Senate in Utah (D-UT)

Labor unions

- American Federation of Government Employees District 12
- Arizona Building and Construction Trades Council
- Arizona State AFL–CIO
- Communications Workers of America
- International Association of Sheet Metal, Air, Rail and Transportation Workers Local 359
- National Education Association
- Southwest Regional Council of Carpenters
- United Automobile Workers
- United Food and Commercial Workers Local 99
- United Mine Workers of America

Organizations

- Alliance for Retired Americans
- Democratic Senatorial Campaign Committee
- EMILY's List
- End Citizens United
- Equality PAC
- Feminist Majority Political Action Committee
- High School Democrats of Arizona
- Human Rights Campaign
- League of Conservation Voters Action Fund
- Let America Vote
- LGBTQ Victory Fund
- LPAC
- National Committee to Preserve Social Security and Medicare
- National Organization for Women
- Planned Parenthood Action Fund
- Population Connection
- Rachel's Action Network
- Run with Pride
- Stonewall Democrats of Arizona

Newspapers

- The Arizona Republic

=== Fundraising ===
Campaign finance reports as of October 17, 2018
Candidate (party)	Total receipts	Total disbursements	Cash on hand
Kyrsten Sinema (D)	$19,287,249	$20,249,341	$1,301,542
Martha McSally (R)	$16,211,836	$13,688,178	$2,523,657
Source: Federal Election Commission

=== Polling ===
View source data.

Poll source	Date(s) administered	Sample size	Margin of error	Martha McSally (R)	Kyrsten Sinema (D)	Angela Green (G)	Other	Undecided
The Trafalgar Group (R)	November 4–5, 2018	1,217	± 2.8%	47%	45%	–	2%	6%
HarrisX	November 3–5, 2018	600	± 4.0%	44%	49%	–	–	–
HarrisX	November 2–4, 2018	600	± 4.0%	46%	47%	–	–	–
OH Predictive Insights	November 2–3, 2018	631	± 3.9%	49%	48%	0%	–	1%
Emerson College	November 1–3, 2018	758	± 3.7%	48%	49%	2%	–	2%
HarrisX	November 1–3, 2018	600	± 4.0%	48%	46%	–	–	–
Research Co.	November 1–3, 2018	450	± 4.6%	44%	45%	–	1%	10%
HarrisX	October 31 – November 2, 2018	600	± 4.0%	49%	44%	–	–	–
Gravis Marketing	October 24 – November 2, 2018	1,165	± 2.9%	47%	46%	–	–	7%
HarrisX	October 30 – November 1, 2018	600	± 4.0%	48%	42%	–	–	–
The Trafalgar Group (R)	October 30 – November 1, 2018	2,166	± 2.1%	47%	50%	–	2%	1%
HarrisX	October 29–31, 2018	600	± 4.0%	49%	42%	–	–	–
Vox Populi Polling	October 27–30, 2018	677	± 3.7%	48%	52%	–	–	–
HarrisX	October 24–30, 2018	1,400	± 2.6%	48%	43%	–	–	–
FOX News	October 27–29, 2018	643 LV	± 3.5%	46%	46%	–	3%	5%
FOX News	October 27–29, 2018	710 RV	± 3.5%	44%	45%	–	4%	6%
CNN/SSRS	October 24–29, 2018	702 LV	± 4.4%	47%	51%	–	0%	1%
CNN/SSRS	October 24–29, 2018	867 RV	± 4.0%	45%	48%	–	0%	3%
HighGround Public Affairs	October 26–28, 2018	400	± 4.9%	47%	45%	4%	–	5%
NBC News/Marist College	October 23–27, 2018	506 LV	± 5.4%	44%	47%	6%	<1%	3%
NBC News/Marist College	October 23–27, 2018	506 LV	± 5.4%	44%	50%	–	2%	4%
NBC News/Marist College	October 23–27, 2018	793 RV	± 4.4%	43%	45%	7%	<1%	5%
NBC News/Marist College	October 23–27, 2018	793 RV	± 4.4%	43%	49%	–	2%	6%
CBS News/YouGov	October 23–26, 2018	972	± 4.1%	44%	47%	–	3%	5%
Ipsos	October 17–26, 2018	799	± 4.0%	48%	46%	–	3%	3%
OH Predictive Insights	October 22–23, 2018	600	± 4.0%	52%	45%	1%	–	2%
NYT Upshot/Siena College	October 15–19, 2018	606	± 4.2%	48%	46%	1%	–	6%
Data Orbital	October 16–17, 2018	600	± 4.0%	41%	47%	3%	1%	8%
Change Research (D)	October 9–10, 2018	783	–	44%	44%	–	–	11%
CBS News/YouGov	October 2–5, 2018	898	–	44%	47%	–	3%	6%
OH Predictive Insights	October 1–2, 2018	600	± 4.0%	47%	41%	4%	–	8%
FOX News	September 29 – October 2, 2018	716 LV	± 3.5%	45%	47%	–	2%	6%
FOX News	September 29 – October 2, 2018	806 RV	± 3.5%	44%	45%	–	2%	8%
Vox Populi Polling	September 29 – October 1, 2018	702	± 3.5%	52%	49%	–	–	–
Suffolk University	September 27–30, 2018	500	± 4.4%	42%	45%	2%	0%	11%
Latino Decisions	September 10–25, 2018	463 LV	–	41%	47%	–	–	11%
Latino Decisions	September 10–25, 2018	610 RV	–	37%	43%	–	–	17%
Emerson College	September 19–21, 2018	650	± 4.4%	39%	45%	–	4%	13%
NBC News/Marist College	September 16–20, 2018	564 LV	± 4.7%	43%	45%	6%	<1%	6%
NBC News/Marist College	September 16–20, 2018	564 LV	± 4.7%	45%	48%	–	<1%	7%
NBC News/Marist College	September 16–20, 2018	763 RV	± 4.2%	41%	44%	6%	<1%	8%
NBC News/Marist College	September 16–20, 2018	763 RV	± 4.2%	44%	47%	–	<1%	9%
CNN/SSRS	September 11–15, 2018	761 LV	± 4.3%	43%	50%	–	0%	3%
CNN/SSRS	September 11–15, 2018	854 RV	± 4.1%	41%	48%	–	1%	6%
Ipsos	September 5–14, 2018	1,016	± 4.0%	44%	47%	–	4%	5%
TargetSmart (D)	September 8–13, 2018	800	± 4.0%	46%	51%	–	1%	3%
FOX News	September 8–11, 2018	710 LV	± 3.5%	44%	47%	–	2%	5%
FOX News	September 8–11, 2018	801 RV	± 3.5%	42%	46%	–	3%	7%
Gravis Marketing	September 5–7, 2018	882	± 3.3%	49%	48%	–	–	3%
OH Predictive Insights	September 5–6, 2018	597	± 4.0%	49%	46%	–	–	6%
Data Orbital	September 4–6, 2018	550	± 4.2%	42%	46%	–	2%	9%
OH Predictive Insights	July 23–24, 2018	600	± 4.0%	44%	48%	–	–	8%
Gravis Marketing	June 27 – July 2, 2018	925	± 3.2%	39%	43%	–	–	19%
SurveyMonkey/Axios	June 11 – July 2, 2018	1,290	± 4.5%	44%	48%	–	–	7%
Emerson College	June 21–22, 2018	650	± 4.0%	32%	40%	–	9%	20%
CBS News/YouGov	June 19–22, 2018	869 LV	–	37%	45%	–	7%	10%
CBS News/YouGov	June 19–22, 2018	998 RV	± 3.7%	34%	41%	–	8%	14%
NBC News/Marist College	June 17–21, 2018	839	± 4.5%	38%	49%	–	2%	11%
SurveyMonkey/Axios	April 2–23, 2018	1,667	± 4.0%	42%	51%	–	–	7%
OH Predictive Insights	April 10–11, 2018	600	± 4.0%	42%	48%	–	–	10%
Public Policy Polling (D) (Note: This poll was sponsored by Protect Our Care, an Affordable Care Act advocacy group, and is affiliated with Democratic candidates.)	March 15–16, 2018	547	± 4.2%	41%	46%	–	–	13%
OH Predictive Insights	November 9, 2017	600	± 4.0%	45%	46%	–	–	9%
Revily (R)	October 28–31, 2017	850	± 3.4%	29%	33%	–	–	37%

Hypothetical polling

with Kelli Ward

Poll source	Date(s) administered	Sample size	Margin of error	Kelli Ward (R)	Kyrsten Sinema (D)	Other	Undecided
OH Predictive Insights	July 23–24, 2018	600	± 4.0%	41%	51%	–	8%
Gravis Marketing	June 27 – July 2, 2018	925	± 3.2%	37%	46%	–	17%
SurveyMonkey/Axios	June 11 – July 2, 2018	1,290	± 4.5%	41%	52%	–	7%
Emerson College	June 21–22, 2018	650	± 4.0%	26%	43%	8%	23%
YouGov	June 19–22, 2018	867 LV	± 3.7%	38%	46%	6%	9%
YouGov	June 19–22, 2018	996 RV	± 3.7%	35%	43%	7%	14%
Marist College	June 17–21, 2018	839	± 4.5%	38%	48%	2%	12%
SurveyMonkey/Axios	April 2–23, 2018	1,667	± 4.0%	43%	51%	–	6%
OH Predictive Insights	April 10–11, 2018	600	± 4.0%	40%	50%	–	10%
OH Predictive Insights	November 9, 2017	600	± 4.0%	43%	46%	–	11%
Revily (R-Ward)	October 28–31, 2017	850	± 3.4%	34%	33%	–	33%
HighGround Public Affairs	October 23–26, 2017	500	± 4.4%	27%	34%	–	39%
HighGround Public Affairs	August 18–19, 2017	400	± 4.9%	31%	32%	–	38%

with Joe Arpaio

Poll source	Date(s) administered	Sample size	Margin of error	Joe Arpaio (R)	Kyrsten Sinema (D)	Other	Undecided
OH Predictive Insights	July 23–24, 2018	600	± 4.0%	36%	54%	–	10%
Gravis Marketing	June 27 – July 2, 2018	925	± 3.2%	33%	52%	–	14%
SurveyMonkey/Axios	June 11 – July 2, 2018	1,290	± 4.5%	34%	57%	–	9%
Emerson College	June 21–22, 2018	650	± 4.0%	30%	54%	8%	9%
YouGov	June 19–22, 2018	868 LV	± 3.7%	29%	49%	13%	8%
YouGov	June 19–22, 2018	996 RV	± 3.7%	28%	45%	13%	11%
Marist College	June 17–21, 2018	839	± 4.5%	32%	57%	2%	9%
SurveyMonkey/Axios	April 2–23, 2018	1,667	± 4.0%	32%	61%	–	7%
OH Predictive Insights	April 10–11, 2018	600	± 4.0%	33%	59%	–	8%

with generic Republican and generic Democrat

Poll source	Date(s) administered	Sample size	Margin of error	Generic Republican	Generic Democrat	Undecided
Morning Consult	June 29 – July 9, 2018	1,641	± 2.0%	35%	42%	23%
Public Policy Polling (D-Protect Our Care)	March 15–16, 2018	547	± 4.2%	47%	45%	8%

with Jeff Flake

Poll source	Date(s) administered	Sample size	Margin of error	Jeff Flake (R)	Kyrsten Sinema (D)	Undecided
GBA Strategies	August 30 – September 7, 2017	600	± 4.0%	40%	47%	13%
HighGround Public Affairs	August 18–19, 2017	400	± 4.9%	33%	41%	27%
Public Policy Polling	May 13–15, 2016	896	± 3.3%	38%	36%	27%

Poll source	Date(s) administered	Sample size	Margin of error	Jeff Flake (R)	Generic Democrat	Undecided
Public Policy Polling (D-Our Lives on the Line)	July 31 – August 1, 2017	704	± 2.0%	31%	47%	22%

with Matt Salmon

Poll source	Date(s) administered	Sample size	Margin of error	Matt Salmon (R)	Kyrsten Sinema (D)	Undecided
Revily (R-Ward)	October 28–31, 2017	850	± 3.4%	30%	32%	38%

=== Results ===
United States Senate election in Arizona, 2018
Party	Candidate	Votes	%	±%
Democratic	Kyrsten Sinema	1,191,100	49.96%	+3.76%
Republican	Martha McSally	1,135,200	47.61%	−1.62%
Green	Angela Green	57,442	2.41%	N/A
Write-in		566	0.02%	N/A
Total votes		2,384,308	100.00%	N/A
Democratic gain from Republican				

By county

County	Kyrsten Sinema Democratic		Martha McSally Republican		Angela Green Green		Write-in		Margin		Total votes
County	#	%	#	%	#	%	#	%	#	%	Total votes
Apache	16,298	64.97	7,810	31.13	961	3.83	18	0.07	8,488	33.83	25,087
Cochise	17,383	38.16	26,929	59.12	1,212	2.66	25	0.05	-9,546	-20.96	45,549
Coconino	34,240	61.94	19,249	34.82	1,757	3.18	34	0.06	14,991	27.12	55,280
Gila	7,643	37.28	12,180	59.42	674	3.29	2	0.01	-4,537	-22.13	20,499
Graham	3,368	31.76	6,870	64.77	363	3.42	5	0.05	-3,502	-33.02	10,606
Greenlee	1,042	40.59	1,416	55.16	108	4.21	1	0.04	-374	-14.57	2,567
La Paz	1,609	31.72	3,265	64.36	199	3.92	0	0.00	-1,656	-32.64	5,073
Maricopa	732,761	50.96	672,505	46.77	32,371	2.25	315	0.02	60,256	4.19	1,437,952
Mohave	19,214	26.88	50,209	70.25	2,027	2.84	19	0.03	-30,995	-43.37	71,469
Navajo	16,624	45.37	18,767	51.22	1,238	3.38	11	0.03	-2,143	-5.85	36,640
Pima	221,242	56.65	160,550	41.11	8,710	2.23	66	0.02	60,692	15.54	390,568
Pinal	50,395	42.93	63,782	54.33	3,183	2.71	35	0.03	-13,387	-11.40	117,395
Santa Cruz	9,241	68.51	3,828	28.38	418	3.10	1	0.01	5,413	40.13	13,488
Yavapai	40,160	37.06	65,308	60.26	2,870	2.65	30	0.03	-25,148	-23.21	108,368
Yuma	19,880	45.42	22,532	51.48	1,351	3.09	4	0.01	-2,652	-6.06	43,767
Totals	1,191,100	49.96	1,135,200	47.61	57,442	2.41	566	0.02	55,900	2.34	2,384,308

Counties that flipped from Republican to Democratic

- Maricopa (largest municipality: Phoenix)

==== By congressional district ====
Sinema won five of nine congressional districts.

District	McSally	Sinema	Representative
1st	46%	51%	Tom O'Halleran
2nd	45%	53%	Ann Kirkpatrick
3rd	33%	64%	Raúl Grijalva
4th	64%	33%	Paul Gosar
5th	55%	42%	Andy Biggs
6th	51%	47%	David Schweikert
7th	21%	75%	Ruben Gallego
8th	55%	43%	Debbie Lesko
9th	36%	61%	Greg Stanton

== Analysis and aftermath ==
The race was too close to call on election day. On November 7, 2018 (one day after the election), KGUN 9 reported that McSally held a narrow lead of 0.9%, with thousands of ballots still uncounted. On November 8, Politico reported that Sinema had taken a 9,610-vote lead. Due to the closeness of the vote count, the Associated Press and other major news outlets did not call the race for Sinema until November 12, 2018, six days after the election. McSally conceded the race to Sinema that day. The results were certified on December 3, 2018.

This was the first Senate election in Arizona won by a Democrat since 1988. Sinema is the first woman to be elected to the U.S. Senate from Arizona. Sinema would later leave the Democratic Party to become an independent in December 2022, although she would continue to caucus with them in the Senate until the end of her term.

On December 18, 2018, Governor Doug Ducey appointed McSally to fill Arizona's other Senate seat. The seat was left vacant after the resignation of Jon Kyl, who himself had been appointed following the August 25, 2018 death of John McCain. Both Sinema and McSally were sworn in with the 116th United States Congress on January 3, 2019, marking the first time in history that Arizona was represented by two women in the United States Senate and making Arizona the second state to be represented by two women from different parties. Ducey stipulated that Sinema would be sworn in first, making her the senior senator; this way, he said, the decision of Arizona's voters would be respected.

Under Arizona law, McSally's appointment was only valid for the duration of the 116th Congress, and a special election for her seat was held in November 2020 to determine who would finish the remainder of McCain's unexpired term (which expired in 2023) and thus became the junior senator. McSally would later be defeated by Democrat Mark Kelly in that special election.

=== Voter demographics ===
Edison Research exit poll
Demographic subgroup	Sinema	McSally	No answer	% of voters
Gender
Men	49	49	2	47
Women	51	47	2	53
Age
18–24 years old	N/A	N/A	N/A	4
25–29 years old	N/A	N/A	N/A	4
30–39 years old	57	39	4	17
40–49 years old	50	48	2	17
50–64 years old	44	55	1	29
65 and older	51	48	1	29
Race
White	45	53	2	75
Black	N/A	N/A	N/A	2
Latino	68	30	2	18
Asian	N/A	N/A	N/A	1
Other	N/A	N/A	N/A	3
Race and gender
White men	42	55	3	34
White women	47	52	1	41
Black men	N/A	N/A	N/A	1
Black women	N/A	N/A	N/A	1
Latino men	66	32	2	9
Latina women	70	28	2	9
Others	N/A	N/A	N/A	4
Education
High school or less	50	46	4	25
Some college education	45	54	1	28
Associate Degree	43	53	4	10
Bachelor's Degree	52	47	3	23
Advanced degree	62	37	1	14
Education and race
White college graduates	55	45	N/A	27
White no college degree	39	58	3	48
Non-white college graduates	72	27	1	9
Non-white no college degree	65	33	2	16
Whites by education and gender
White women with college degrees	56	44	N/A	15
White women without college degrees	42	56	2	26
White men with college degrees	53	47	N/A	12
White men without college degrees	35	61	4	22
Non-whites	68	31	1	25
Military service
Veteran	38	59	3	14
Non-veteran	54	45	1	86
Income
Under $30,000	62	34	4	15
$30,000-$49,999	63	36	1	18
$50,000-$99,999	48	49	3	33
$100,000-$199,999	41	58	1	24
Over $200,000	44	56	N/A	9
Party ID
Democrats	97	3	N/A	32
Republicans	12	86	2	38
Independents	50	47	3	31
Party by gender
Democratic men	94	6	N/A	14
Democratic women	99	1	N/A	17
Republican men	6	91	3	15
Republican women	16	83	1	23
Independent men	50	47	3	18
Independent women	50	47	3	13
Ideology
Liberals	94	6	N/A	22
Moderates	63	35	2	38
Conservatives	14	84	2	40
First-time midterm election voter
Yes	53	44	3	15
No	48	50	2	85
Most important issue facing the country
Health care	77	20	3	42
Immigration	16	83	1	31
Economy	39	60	1	18
Gun policy	N/A	N/A	N/A	7
Area type
Urban	60	39	1	43
Suburban	44	54	2	51
Rural	N/A	N/A	N/A	6
Source: CNN

== Notes ==
Partisan clients
