= Jonathan Lines =

American businessman and politician

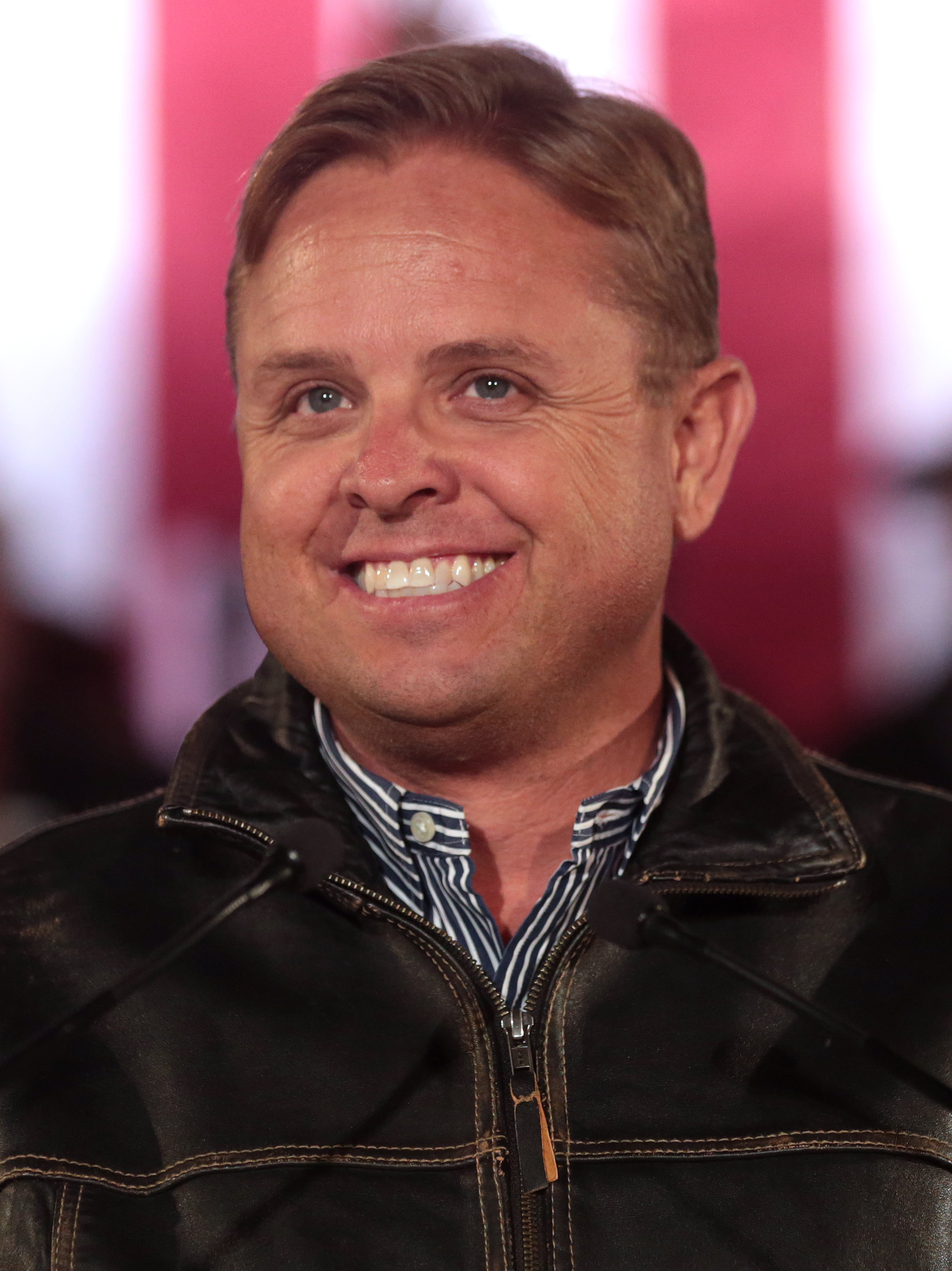
- Lines in 2018

Chair of the Arizona Republican Party
- In office January 28, 2017 – January 26, 2019
- Preceded by: Robert Graham
- Succeeded by: Kelli Ward

Personal details
- Born: May 1970 (age 56) Yuma, Arizona, U.S.
- Party: Republican
- Education: Northern Arizona University (BA)

Jonathan Wilton Lines (born May 1970) is an American businessman and former chairman of the Arizona Republican Party. Lines is the general manager of Lines & Lundgreen Roofing and Insulation Inc.

== Personal life ==
Lines has 11 children. He is a member of the Church of Jesus Christ of Latter-day Saints.

== Arizona Republican Party ==
Lines took over the party after 2016, a difficult presidential election year. While Donald Trump won the Arizona presidential primary-preference election, the state elected almost all Ted Cruz-supporting delegates to the convention. Chairman Lines was then faced with the challenge of uniting the party before the mid-term elections.

In 2019, Lines lost re-election to former state Senator Kelli Ward.

Party political offices
Preceded by Robert Graham	Chair of the Arizona Republican Party; 2017–2019	Succeeded by Kelli Ward
