= 2016 United States Senate election in Arizona =

- November 8, 2016
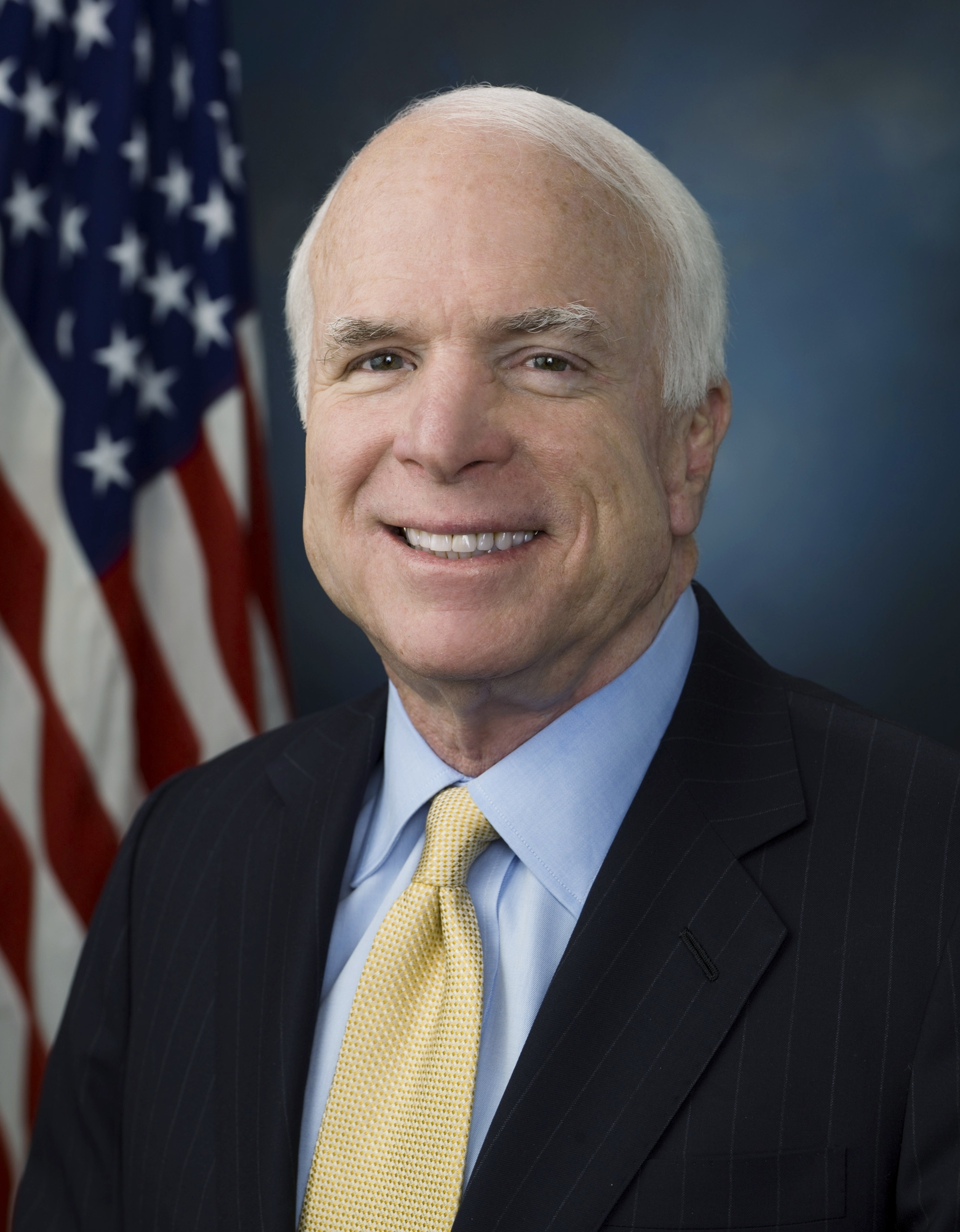

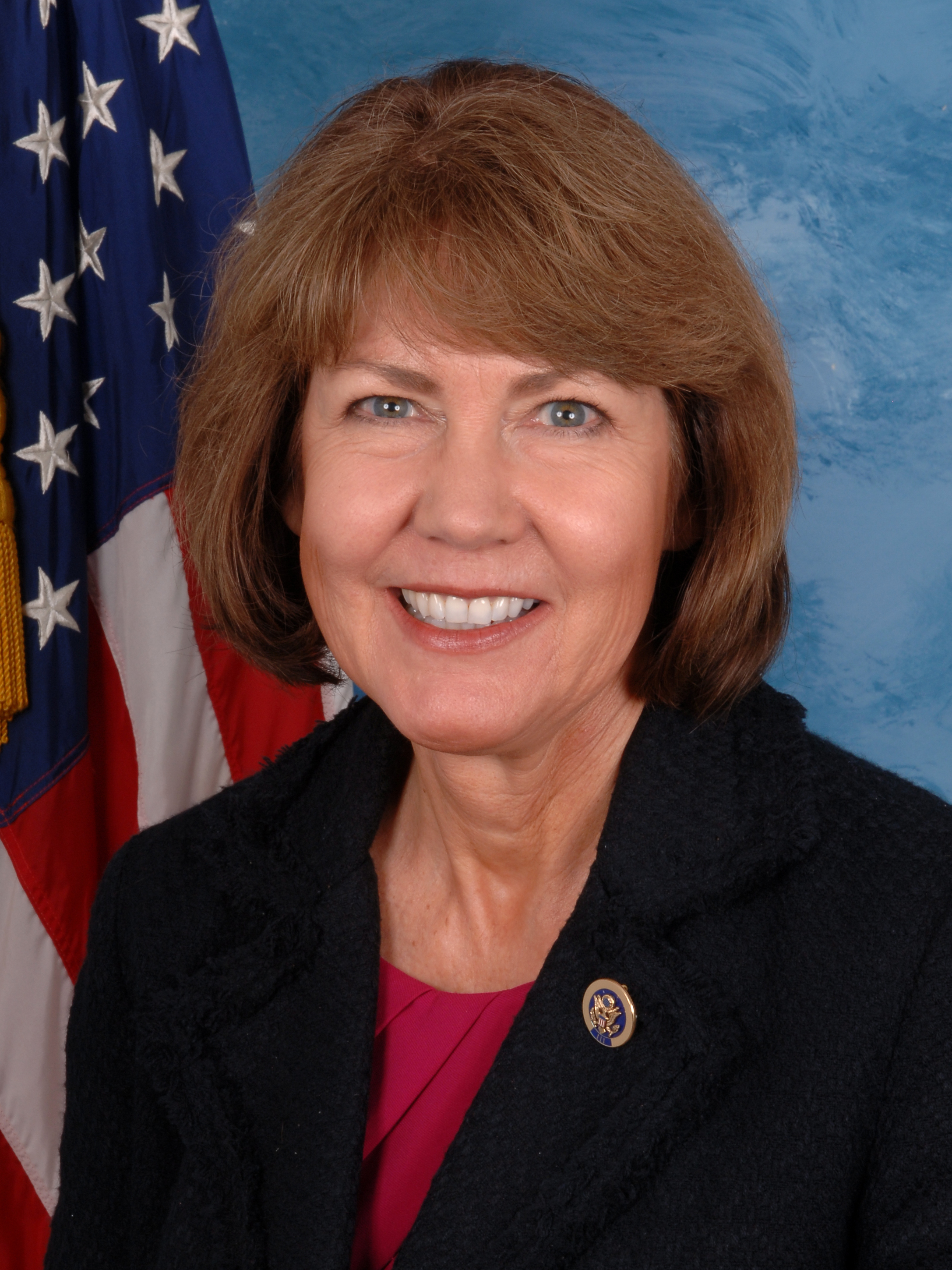

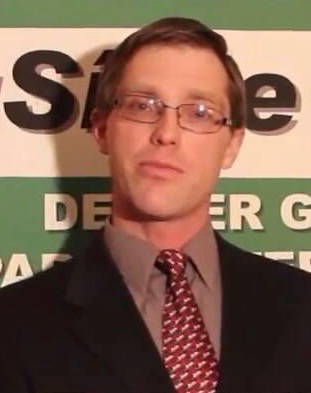
Nominee	John McCain	Ann Kirkpatrick	Gary Swing
Party	Republican	Democratic	Green
Popular vote	1,359,267	1,031,245	138,634
Percentage	53.71%	40.75%	5.48%
- McCain: 40–50% 50–60% 60–70% 70–80% 80–90% >90% Kirkpatrick: 40–50% 50–60% 60–70% 70–80% 80–90% >90% No votes
U.S. senator before election
John McCain
Republican
Elected U.S. Senator
John McCain
Republican

The 2016 United States Senate election in Arizona was held on November 8, 2016, to elect a member of the U.S. Senate to represent the State of Arizona, concurrently with the 2016 U.S. presidential election, other elections to the U.S. Senate in other states, elections to the U.S. House of Representatives, and various state and local elections.

The Democratic primary was held on March 22, 2016, while the Republican primary election took place on August 30, 2016. After serving in the Arizona State Legislature and U.S. House of Representatives for a number of years, Democrat Ann Kirkpatrick sought to unseat incumbent Republican senator John McCain, who won re-election to his sixth and final term in office. McCain died in office on August 25, 2018

After hinting in September 2013 that he could retire, McCain subsequently said that the chances he would run again were "pretty good", but his campaign had emphasized that he had not made a decision yet. On April 7, 2015, he announced that he would run for re-election. McCain faced strong primary opposition from the Tea Party, but he ultimately defeated challenger Kelli Ward in the August 30 primary.

McCain won with 53.7% of the vote compared to Kirkpatrick's 40.8%, with 5.5% voting for the Green candidate Gary Swing. Although McCain won reelection by double digits, this was the closest margin of his Senate career. It was also his first election in which he failed to win the traditionally Democratic counties of Coconino and Pima. As of 2024, this was the last time Republicans won a U.S. Senate seat in Arizona, and the last time Maricopa County voted for a Republican Senate candidate. Kirkpatrick would later successfully run again for the U.S. House of Representatives in Arizona's 2nd congressional district in 2018 and 2020.

== Republican primary ==
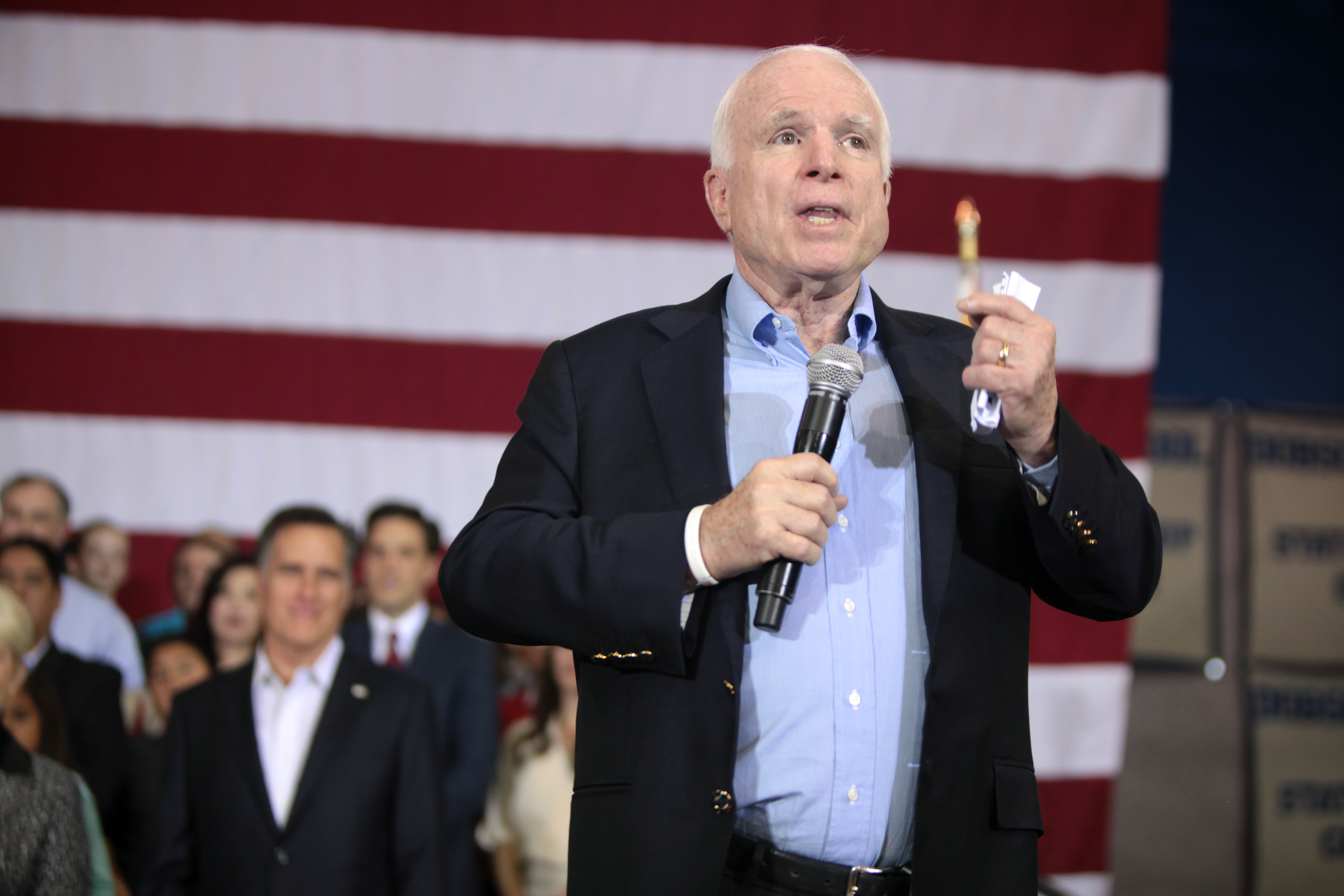
John McCain at a campaign rally with former Massachusetts Governor Mitt Romney in December 2015

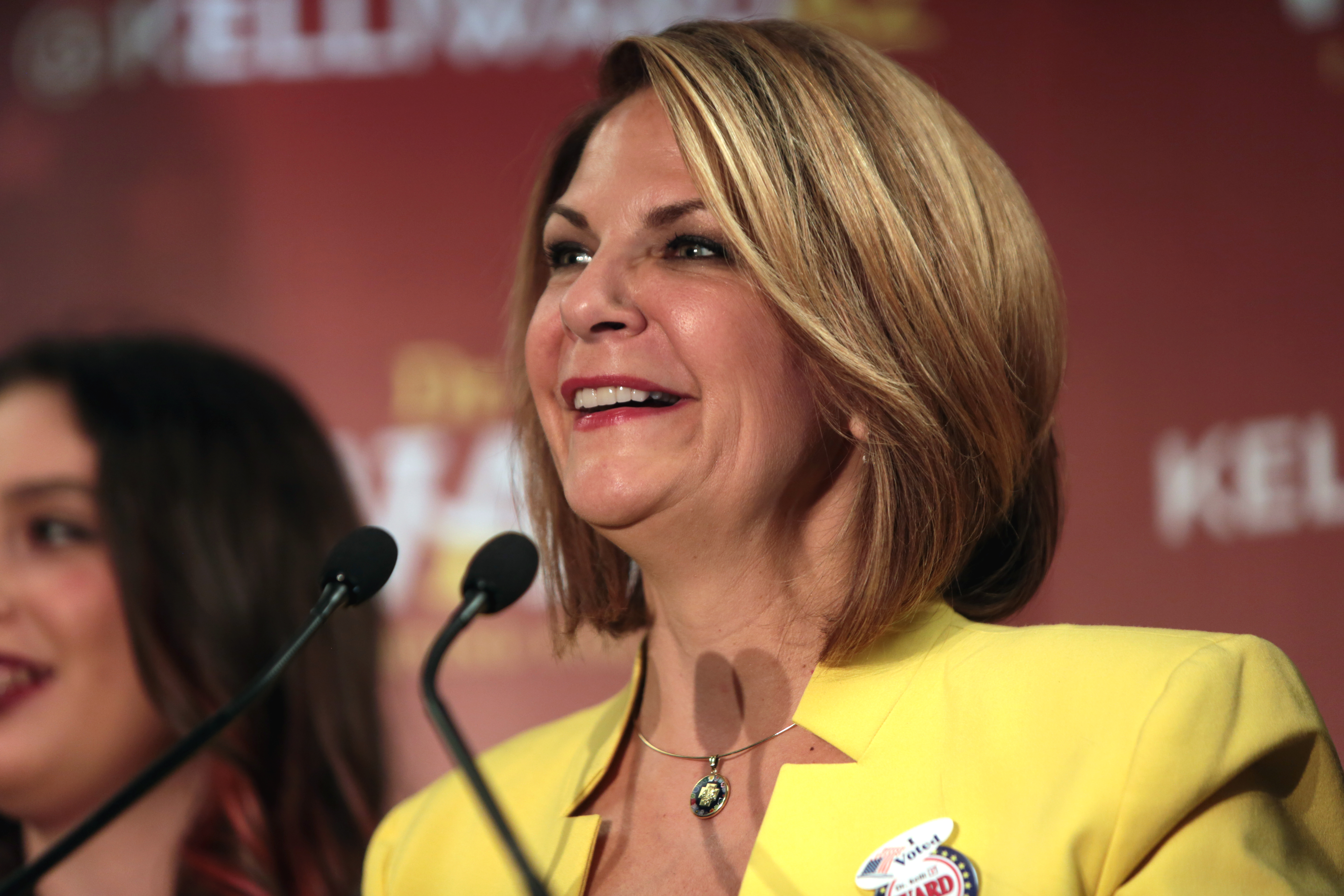
Kelli Ward at her primary election night rally on August 30, 2016

John McCain, the 2008 Republican presidential nominee, was re-elected to a fifth term with 59.3% of the vote in 2010. In September 2013 he hinted that he might retire, saying that "[President Obama's] in his last term, I'm probably in mine." When asked if that meant he wouldn't run for re-election, he said, "I don't know. I was trying to make a point. I have to decide in about two years so I don't have to make a decision [now]. I don't want to be one of these old guys that should've shoved off." He then said in October 2013 that he was "seriously thinking" about running for re-election. By April 2014 he had held his first fundraiser and acknowledged that "elements on the right" would like to primary him, which he said was "fine with me... you know me: a fight not joined is a fight not enjoyed... I know that I will be very well-prepared." Jennifer Duffy of The Cook Political Report noted that McCain did not fit the profile of a "complacent, long-serving incumbent", saying: "It's not an easy thing to take him on. He is going to be well-prepared, and he has a well-earned reputation for running really tough campaigns. He raises a lot of money and he puts together a good organization."

In September 2014, McCain began having "serious conversations" with state Republicans, local officials and key supporters about running for re-election. He faced a primary challenge in 2010 from former Congressman J. D. Hayworth, who some felt was the weaker opponent. McCain massively outspent and easily defeated him. However, he could face a stronger challenger in 2016. A survey by Public Policy Polling in March 2014 found that McCain was the most unpopular Senator in the country, with 30% of Arizonans approving of him to 54% who disapproved. His unpopularity was bipartisan, with his approvals at 35%–55% with Republicans, 29%–53% with Democrats and 25%–55% with independents. An April 2014 survey by the Polling Company for Citizens United Political Victory Fund found that 64.2% of Republican primary voters favored "a new person" to 29.3% who thought that "Senator McCain deserves to be re-elected to another six-year term." It also found him trailing in match-ups with a generic primary opponent and against specific opponents (see below).

Further compounding matters for McCain was his relationship with the Arizona Republican Party. After his re-election in 2010, McCain adopted more orthodox conservative stances and attitudes and largely opposed actions of the Obama administration. By 2013, however, he had become a key figure in the Senate for negotiating deals on certain issues in an otherwise partisan environment. By early 2014, McCain's apostasies were enough that the Arizona Republican Party formally censured him for having what they saw as a liberal record that had been "disastrous and harmful". The action had no practical effect but showed that McCain's history of being criticized at the state level as insufficiently conservative was still ongoing. Tea Party leaders have said that they are "sick to death" of McCain and will oppose him if he seeks re-election, with one prominent critic of McCain saying that Arizona conservatives were preparing for a "civil war". However, McCain still had a large warchest – $1.7 million as of June 2014 – and would be helped by Arizona state law, which allows independents to vote in the Republican primary.

By early October 2014, McCain was telling reporters that the odds of his running for re-election were "pretty good", saying that whether or not Republicans retake control of the Senate in the 2014 elections would be a factor in his decision-making, "but it certainly wouldn't be the deciding factor." In late October, it was revealed that McCain had scheduled a meeting with supporters two days after the 2014 midterm elections to "discuss my thoughts on my own re-election in 2016." At that meeting, following the Republican takeover of the Senate, he said that he was "seriously considering" and "leaning towards" running for re-election and will make an announcement in early 2015.

In December 2014, Politico reported that McCain and his allies were waging an "aggressive and systematic campaign" to purge the Arizona Republican Party's apparatus of Tea Party and far-right conservatives who hold "obscure, but influential, local party offices" and replace them with McCain loyalists. The Super PAC "Arizona Grassroots Action" was created, which raised almost $300,000 and supported McCain-allied candidates with mailers and automated phone calls, bringing attention to what were previously low-profile and uncontested races. Before August 26, when elections for party offices were held, almost all of the 3,925 precinct committeemen (who vote for local party chairmen, who in turn make decisions on how the party will spend state and local funds, which candidates receive endorsements or funding etc.) were opposed to McCain. After the elections, 1,531 (39%) were regarded as supportive of McCain. Most notably, Timothy Schwartz, who authored the resolution which censured McCain, was ousted. Schwartz attacked McCain for using his "prominence and money and influence" to "ramrod" his critics and former Maricopa County Republican Party Chairman A.J. LaFaro said that McCain was "vindictive" and engaging in the equivalent of "ethnic cleansing".

Tea Party Congressmen Matt Salmon and David Schweikert had been widely regarded as two of the most serious potential challengers to McCain. The pair, who are close friends, agreed that if one of them decided to run against McCain, the other would not do so, to ensure that the anti-McCain vote wouldn't be split between them. Schweikert has acknowledged that he polled the race in 2014 but was considered the less likely of the two to run – he had much less cash-on-hand than Salmon and admitted that his wife was "not thrilled" at the idea of him running for the Senate. Salmon later stated that he would not challenge McCain in the primary.

In early February, McCain said that he was "most likely" running for re-election and Club for Growth President David McIntosh said that the organization would "watch closely" the primary race, particularly if Salmon or Schweikert ran, and would "do research and polling and determine if there's a path to victory [against McCain]." Towards the end of February, Salmon and Schweikert began to distance themselves from the race, with State Senator Kelli Ward revealing that she was considering a run.

McCain officially announced on April 7, 2015, that he was running for re-election.

=== Candidates ===
==== Declared ====
- John McCain, incumbent U.S. senator
- Clair Van Steenwyk, talk radio host, candidate for U.S. Senate in 2012 and candidate for Arizona's 8th congressional district in 2014
- Kelli Ward, former state senator

==== Withdrawn ====
- Alex Meluskey, printing company owner and FairTax activist
- David Pizer, businessman

==== Declined ====
- Jan Brewer, former governor of Arizona
- Jeff DeWit, state treasurer of Arizona
- Trent Franks, U.S. representative from Arizona's 8th congressional district
- Paul Gosar, U.S. representative from Arizona's 4th congressional district (ran for re-election)
- Christine Jones, former executive vice president, general counsel and corporate secretary for Go Daddy and candidate for governor in 2014 (ran for U.S. House)
- Martha McSally, U.S. representative from Arizona's 2nd congressional district (ran for re-election)
- Matt Salmon, U.S. representative from Arizona's 5th congressional district
- David Schweikert, U.S. representative from Arizona's 6th congressional district (ran for re-election)
- John Shadegg, former U.S. representative
- Grant Woods, former Arizona attorney general

=== Endorsements ===
John McCain

Individuals

- John Bolton, 25th United States ambassador to the United Nations
- Mark Brnovich, Arizona attorney general
- George W. Bush, 43rd president of the United States
- Carly Fiorina, former CEO of Hewlett-Packard, 2010 Republican nominee for Senate in California, and 2016 presidential candidate
- Newt Gingrich, former speaker of the United States House of Representatives and former representative of Georgia's 6th congressional district
- Luis Gonzalez, former Arizona Diamondbacks outfielder and notable Cuban-American
- Fred Karger, political consultant and 2012 presidential candidate
- Evan McMullin, former chief policy director for the House Republican Conference in the U.S. House of Representatives, former CIA operations officer and 2016 independent candidate for president
- Reince Priebus, Republican National Committee chairman
- Mitt Romney, former governor of Massachusetts, 2012 Republican nominee for president
- Paul Ryan, speaker of the U.S. House of Representatives, U.S representative for Wisconsin's 1st congressional district and 2012 GOP vice presidential nominee
- Donald Trump, 2016 Republican presidential nominee, later 45th and 47th president of the United States

Senators

- Senator Tom Cotton (R-AR)
- Senator Joni Ernst (R-IA)
- Senator Jeff Flake (R-AZ)
- Senator Cory Gardner (R-CO)
- Senator Lindsey Graham (R-SC)
- Senator David Perdue (R-GA)
- Senator Dan Sullivan (R-AK)

Governors

- Former governor of Arizona Jan Brewer (22nd governor, State of Arizona)
- Governor Doug Ducey, current governor of Arizona
- Governor Jane D. Hull (20th governor, State of Arizona)
- Governor John Kasich (former governor of Ohio)
- Governor Mike Pence of Indiana and 48th vice president of the United States
- Governor Fife Symington (19th governor, State of Arizona)

Mayors

- Mayor Richard Anderson, Kingman, Arizona
- Mayor Gail Barney, Queen Creek, Arizona
- Mayor Robin Boyd, Winslow, Arizona
- Former mayor Barbara Brewer, Payson, Arizona
- Former mayor Greg Bryan, Tusayan, Arizona
- Mayor Cathy Carlat, Peoria, Arizona
- Mayor Tom Claridge, Pima, Arizona
- Mayor Michael Collins, Paradise Valley, Arizona
- Mayor John Doyle, Nogales, Arizona
- Mayor Kenny Evans, Payson, Arizona
- Mayor Vincent Francia, Cave Creek, Arizona
- Mayor Charles German, Camp Verde, Arizona
- Mayor Chris Gibbs, Safford, Arizona
- Mayor John Giles, Mesa, Arizona
- Former mayor Hugh Hallman, Tempe, Arizona
- Mayor Satish Hiremath, Oro Valley, Arizona
- Mayor Ed Honea, Marana, Arizona
- Mayor John Insalaco, Apache Junction, Arizona
- Mayor Robert Irvin, Willcox, Arizona
- Mayor R.E. Isakson, Patagonia, Arizona
- Mayor Diane Joens, Cottonwood, Arizona
- Mayor Alvy Johnson, Fredonia, Arizona
- Former mayor Martin Kuykendall, Prescott, Arizona
- Vice Mayor Sheri Lauritano, Goodyear, Arizona
- Mayor Michael LeVault, Youngtown, Arizona
- Mayor John Lewis, Gilbert, Arizona
- Mayor Georgia Lord, Goodyear, Arizona
- Mayor Cecilia McCollough, Wellton, Arizona
- Mayor Ronnie McDaniel, Star Valley, Arizona
- Mayor Jackie Meck, Buckeye, Arizona
- Mayor Lana Mook, El Mirage, Arizona
- Mayor John Moore, Williams, Arizona
- Mayor Rick Mueller, Sierra Vista, Arizona
- Mayor Douglas Nicholls, Yuma, Arizona
- Mayor Terry Nolan, Dewey-Humboldt, Arizona
- Mayor Harry Oberg, Prescott, Arizona
- Mayor Ryan Patterson, St. Johns, Arizona
- Mayor Les Peterson, Carefree, Arizona
- Mayor Tom Poscharsky, Snowflake, Arizona
- Mayor Bob Rivera, Thatcher, Arizona
- Mayor Jerry Sanchez, San Luis, Arizona
- Mayor Graig Sanderson, Tusayan, Arizona
- Mayor Thomas Schoaf, Litchfield Park, Arizona
- Mayor Daryl Seymore, Show Low, Arizona
- Former vice mayor Onnie Shekerjian, Tempe, Arizona
- Mayor Harvy Skoog, Prescott Valley, Arizona
- Mayor Gregory Smith, Pinetop-Lakeside, Arizona
- Former mayor Scott Smith, Mesa, Arizona
- Former mayor Bob Stain, Sierra Vista, Arizona
- Mayor Ken Taylor, Huachuca City, Arizona
- Mayor Jay Tibshraeny, Chandler, Arizona
- Vice Mayor Douglas Treadway, Dewey-Humboldt, Arizona
- Mayor Bobby Tyler, Holbrook, Arizona
- Mayor Billy Waters, Duncan, Arizona
- Mayor Kenneth Weise, Avondale, Arizona
- Former mayor Roger Williams, Pinetop-Lakeside, Arizona

Organizations

- National Border Patrol Council
- National Federation of Independent Business
- National Right to Life
- Organization of Iranian American Communities, U.S.
- United States Hispanic Chamber of Commerce
Alex Meluskey (withdrew)

Individuals

- Robert K. Corbin, former president of the National Rifle Association of America and former Arizona Attorney General
- Lori Klein, former state senator
- Dick Morris, conservative political consultant and commentator
- Paul E. Vallely, retired US Army major general and senior military analyst for Fox News
Kelli Ward

Individuals

- Sylvia Allen, president pro tempore of the Arizona Senate
- Nancy Barto, state senator
- Dave Farnsworth, state senator
- John Fillmore, former state representative
- Mark Finchem, state representative
- Jim Gilchrist, co-founder and president of the Minuteman Project
- Louie Gohmert, U.S. representative from Texas
- Gail Griffin, state senator
- Laura Ingraham, conservative radio host
- Michael Johns, former White House speechwriter, former Heritage Foundation policy analyst, and Tea Party activist
- Anthony Kern, state representative
- Vince Leach, state representative
- Mark Levin, conservative radio host
- Richard Mack, former Graham County sheriff, candidate for TX-21 in 2012 and Libertarian candidate for U.S. Senate in 2006
- Charles Main, former Arlington Elementary School Board president
- Thomas Massie, U.S. representative from Kentucky
- Al Melvin, former state senator and candidate for governor in 2014
- Tom Morrissey, former chairman of the Arizona Republican Party and 2014 state senate candidate
- Jill Norgaard, state representative
- Ron Paul, 2012 Republican presidential candidate and former U.S. representative from Texas
- Russell Pearce, former president of the Arizona Senate
- Warren Petersen, state representative
- Carl Seel, former state representative
- Steve Smith, state senator
- Emilena Turley, Queen Creek Town Council member

Organizations

- Americans for Legal Immigration (ALIPAC)
- Gun Owners of America

=== Polling ===
Poll source	Date(s) administered	Sample size	Margin of error	John McCain	Kelli Ward	Clair Van Steenwyk	Alex Meluskey	Other	Undecided
Public Policy Polling	May 1–3, 2015	300	± 5.7%	44%	31%	—	—	—	25%
Behavior Research Center	October 24 – November 5, 2015	577	± 4.7%	41%	11%	2%	1%	—	45%
Behavior Research Center	January 6–17, 2016	398	± 4.1%	47%	11%	1%	1%	1%	39%
Public Policy Polling	May 13–15, 2016	443	± 4.7%	39%	26%	2%	4%	3%	27%
Public Policy Polling	May 13–15, 2016	443	± 4.7%	41%	41%	—	—	—	17%
NMB Research	July 11, 2016	500	± 4.38%	47%	22%	2%	6%	—	23%
Data Orbital LLC	August 11, 2016	500	±4.38%	50%	29%	—	—	—	17%
CNN/ORC	August 18–23, 2016	413	± 5.0%	55%	29%	4%	—	1%	3%

Hypothetical polling

with Jan Brewer

Poll source	Date(s) administered	Sample size	Margin of error	John McCain	Jan Brewer	Other	Undecided
The Polling Company	April 11–12, 2014	600	± 4.1%	29%	47.7%	—	23.3%

with Christine Jones

Poll source	Date(s) administered	Sample size	Margin of error	John McCain	Christine Jones	Other	Undecided
Public Policy Polling	May 1–3, 2015	300	± 5.7%	48%	27%	—	25%

with Matt Salmon

Poll source	Date(s) administered	Sample size	Margin of error	John McCain	Matt Salmon	Other	Undecided
The Polling Company	April 11–12, 2014	600	± 4.1%	30.3%	48.2%	—	21.5%
Public Policy Polling	May 1–3, 2015	300	± 5.7%	42%	40%	—	18%

with David Schweikert

Poll source	Date(s) administered	Sample size	Margin of error	John McCain	David Schweikert	Other	Undecided
The Polling Company	April 11–12, 2014	600	± 4.1%	33.9%	40.1%	—	26%
Public Policy Polling	May 1–3, 2015	300	± 5.7%	40%	39%	—	20%

Generic Republican

Poll source	Date(s) administered	Sample size	Margin of error	John McCain	A different Republican	Other	Undecided
The Polling Company	April 11–12, 2014	600	± 4.1%	30.5%	60.7%	—	8.8%

Someone more conservative

Poll source	Date(s) administered	Sample size	Margin of error	John McCain	Someone more conservative	Other	Undecided
Public Policy Polling	May 1–3, 2015	300	± 5.7%	37%	51%	—	12%

=== Results ===
Results by county: McCain—50–60% McCain—40–50% Ward—50–60% Ward—40–50%

Republican primary results
Party	Candidate	Votes	%
Republican	John McCain (incumbent)	302,532	51.7%
Republican	Kelli Ward	235,988	39.2%
Republican	Alex Meluskey	31,159	5.5%
Republican	Clair Van Steenwyk	21,476	3.6%
Republican	Sean Webster (write-in)	175	0.0%
Total votes		591,330	100.0%

== Democratic primary ==
=== Candidates ===
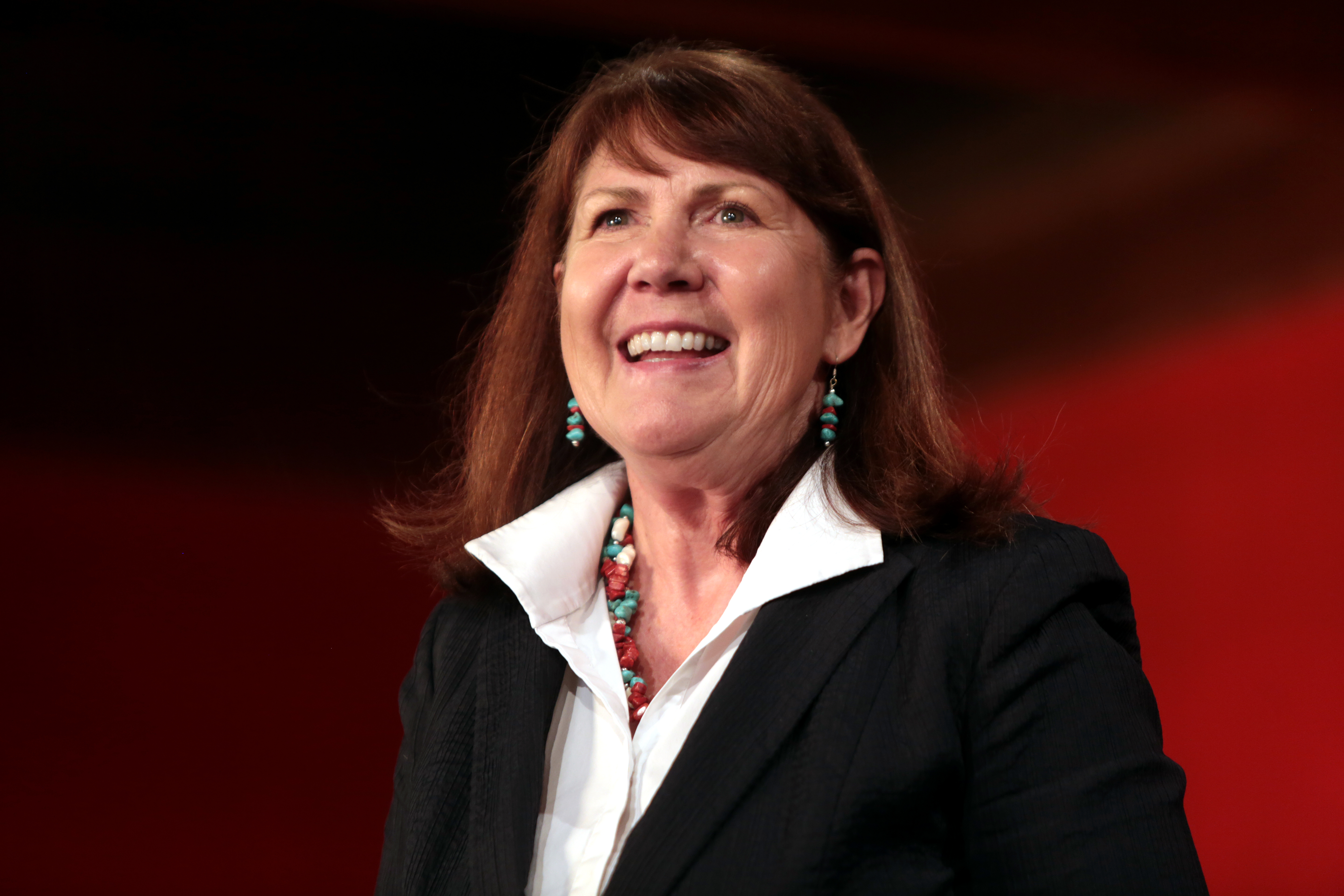
Ann Kirkpatrick at a campaign event with supporters in Phoenix, Arizona

==== Nominee ====
- Ann Kirkpatrick, U.S. representative from Arizona's 1st congressional district

==== Withdrawn ====
- Leonard Clark, teacher, state house candidate in 2002, 2004, and 2008 and Green Party nominee for AZ-03 in 2010
- Richard Sherzan, retired administrative law judge and former Iowa state representative

==== Declined ====
- Richard Carmona, former surgeon general and nominee for the U.S. Senate in 2012
- Fred DuVal, former chairman of the Arizona Board of Regents and nominee for governor in 2014
- Ruben Gallego, U.S. representative from Arizona's 7th congressional district (ran for re-election)
- Phil Gordon, former mayor of Phoenix
- Mark Kelly, retired astronaut and husband of former Congresswoman Gabrielle Giffords
- Janet Napolitano, president of the University of California System, former secretary of Homeland Security and former governor of Arizona
- Greg Stanton, mayor of Phoenix
- Nan Walden, businesswoman, attorney and former chief of staff to Senator Bill Bradley

=== Endorsements ===
Ann Kirkpatrick

U.S. senators

- Dennis DeConcini, Arizona (former)
- Kirsten Gillibrand, New York

U.S. representatives

- Ron Barber, Arizona (former)
- Harry Mitchell, Arizona (former)
- Ed Pastor, Arizona (former)

Organizations

- Democratic Senatorial Campaign Committee
- EMILY's List
- Planned Parenthood

=== Results ===
Democratic primary results
Party	Candidate	Votes	%
Democratic	Ann Kirkpatrick	333,586	99.8%
Democratic	Axel Bello (write-in)	508	0.2%
Total votes		334,094	100.0%

== Green primary ==
=== Candidates ===
==== Declared ====
- Gary Swing (write-in)

=== Results ===
Green primary results
Party	Candidate	Votes	%
Green	Gary Swing (write-in)	238	100.0%
Total votes		238	100.0%

== Libertarian primary ==
=== Candidates ===
- Merissa Hamilton (write-in)

=== Results ===
Libertarian primary results
Party	Candidate	Votes	%
Libertarian	Merissa Hamilton (write-in)	1,286	100.0%
Total votes		1,286	100.0%

== General election ==
=== Debates ===
Date	Location	McCain	Kirkpatrick	Link
October 10, 2016	Phoenix, Arizona	Participant	Participant	

=== Predictions ===
Source	Ranking	As of
The Cook Political Report	Lean R	November 2, 2016
Sabato's Crystal Ball	Likely R	November 7, 2016
Rothenberg Political Report	Likely R	November 3, 2016
Daily Kos	Safe R	November 8, 2016

=== Polling ===
Poll source	Date(s) administered	Sample size	Margin of error	John McCain (R)	Ann Kirkpatrick (D)	Other	Undecided
SurveyMonkey	November 1–7, 2016	2,609	± 4.6%	50%	45%	—	5%
Insights West	November 4–6, 2016	392	± 4.9%	50%	42%	—	9%
Data Orbital	November 4–6, 2016	550	± 4.1%	56%	44%	—	0%
SurveyMonkey	October 31–November 6, 2016	2,322	± 4.6%	50%	45%	—	5%
SurveyMonkey	October 28–November 3, 2016	1,748	± 4.6%	50%	45%	—	5%
Data Orbital	November 1–2, 2016	550	± 4.1%	52%	41%	2%	6%
SurveyMonkey	October 27–November 2, 2016	1,461	± 4.6%	50%	44%	—	6%
NBC/WSJ/Marist	October 30–November 1, 2016	719 LV	± 3.7%	55%	39%	5%	2%
NBC/WSJ/Marist	October 30–November 1, 2016	948 RV	± 3.2%	55%	38%	5%	2%
The Times-Picayune/Lucid	October 28–November 1, 2016	1,113	± 3.0%	52%	40%	—	8%
CNN/ORC	October 27–November 1, 2016	769 LV	± 3.5%	54%	41%	1%	3%
CNN/ORC	October 27–November 1, 2016	867 RV	± 3.5%	54%	41%	3%	1%
SurveyMonkey	October 26–November 1, 2016	1,320	± 4.6%	50%	44%	—	6%
Emerson College	October 29–31, 2016	700	± 3.6%	46%	40%	6%	9%
SurveyMonkey	October 25–31, 2016	1,457	± 4.6%	49%	46%	—	5%
Data Orbital	October 29–30, 2016	550	± 4.1%	49%	39%	3%	10%
CBS News/YouGov	October 26–28, 2016	994	± 4.3%	43%	38%	8%	11%
Monmouth University	October 21–24, 2016	401	± 4.9%	50%	40%	5%	4%
Washington Post/SurveyMonkey	October 8–16, 2016	1,028	± 0.5%	48%	45%	—	6%
Arizona Republic/Morrison/Cronkite	October 10–15, 2016	660	± 4.2%	52%	40%	8%	0%
Highground	October 14, 2016	400	± 4.9%	45%	35%	8%	9%
Emerson College	October 2–4, 2016	600	± 3.6%	52%	36%	7%	5%
Insights West	September 12–14, 2016	484	± 4.5%	53%	35%	1%	11%
NBC/WSJ/Marist	September 6–8, 2016	649	± 3.8%	57%	38%	1%	4%
Public Policy Polling	August 26–28, 2016	837	± 3.0%	43%	43%	—	15%
CNN/ORC	August 18–23, 2016	809 LV	± 3.5%	52%	39%	2%	2%
CNN/ORC	August 18–23, 2016	842 RV	± 3.5%	52%	39%	2%	2%
Public Policy Polling	June 22–23, 2016	691	± 3.7%	42%	40%	—	19%
Greenberg Quinlan Rosner – Democracy Corps	June 11–20, 2016	300	± 5.7%	44%	42%	—	14%
Behavior Research Center	June 6–19, 2016	448	± 4.7%	40%	31%	—	29%
Public Policy Polling	June 8–9, 2016	747	± 3.6%	41%	43%	—	16%
Public Policy Polling	May 13–15, 2016	896	± 3.3%	42%	36%	—	23%
Behavior Research Center	April 4–11, 2016	564	± 4.2%	42%	42%	—	16%
The Merrill Poll	March 7–11, 2016	701	± 3.7%	41%	40%	3%	16%
Behavior Research Center	January 6–17, 2016	590	± 4.1%	38%	37%	—	25%
Strategies 360	December 4–9, 2015	504	± 4.4%	51%	36%	—	13%
Behavior Research Center	October 24–November 5, 2015	577	± 3.8%	37%	31%	—	32%
Gravis Marketing	August 13–16, 2015	1,433	± 2.6%	48%	35%	—	17%
Public Policy Polling	May 1–3, 2015	600	± 4.0%	42%	36%	—	23%

Hypothetical polling

with John McCain

Poll source	Date(s) administered	Sample size	Margin of error	John McCain (R)	Richard Carmona (D)	Other	Undecided
Public Policy Polling	May 1–3, 2015	600	± 4%	40%	34%	—	25%
Public Policy Polling	February 28–March 2, 2014	870	± 3.3%	35%	41%	—	24%

Poll source	Date(s) administered	Sample size	Margin of error	John McCain (R)	Fred DuVal (D)	Other	Undecided
Public Policy Polling	May 1–3, 2015	600	± 4%	40%	36%	—	24%

Poll source	Date(s) administered	Sample size	Margin of error	John McCain (R)	Gabrielle Giffords (D)	Other	Undecided
Public Policy Polling	February 28–March 2, 2014	870	± 3.3%	35%	42%	—	23%

Poll source	Date(s) administered	Sample size	Margin of error	John McCain (R)	Janet Napolitano (D)	Other	Undecided
Public Policy Polling	February 28–March 2, 2014	870	± 3.3%	44%	36%	—	19%

Poll source	Date(s) administered	Sample size	Margin of error	John McCain (R)	Kyrsten Sinema (D)	Other	Undecided
Public Policy Polling	May 1–3, 2015	600	± 4%	42%	36%	—	22%

with Christine Jones

Poll source	Date(s) administered	Sample size	Margin of error	Christine Jones (R)	Richard Carmona (D)	Other	Undecided
Public Policy Polling	May 1–3, 2015	600	± 4%	36%	42%	—	22%

with Matt Salmon

Poll source	Date(s) administered	Sample size	Margin of error	Matt Salmon (R)	Richard Carmona (D)	Other	Undecided
Public Policy Polling	May 1–3, 2015	600	± 4%	43%	35%	—	21%

with David Schweikert

Poll source	Date(s) administered	Sample size	Margin of error	David Schweikert (R)	Richard Carmona (D)	Other	Undecided
Public Policy Polling	May 1–3, 2015	600	± 4%	39%	39%	—	22%

with Kelli Ward

Poll source	Date(s) administered	Sample size	Margin of error	Kelli Ward (R)	Ann Kirkpatrick (D)	Other	Undecided
Breitbart/Gravis Marketing	August 27, 2016	1,244	± 2.8%	53%	19%	—	29%
Public Policy Polling	May 13–15, 2016	896	± 3.3%	37%	35%	—	28%
Gravis Marketing	August 13–16, 2015	1,433	± 2.6%	43%	38%	—	19%

Poll source	Date(s) administered	Sample size	Margin of error	Kelli Ward (R)	Richard Carmona (D)	Other	Undecided
Public Policy Polling	May 1–3, 2015	600	± 4%	36%	39%	—	26%

=== Results ===
United States Senate election in Arizona, 2016
Party	Candidate	Votes	%	±%
Republican	John McCain (incumbent)	1,359,267	53.71%	−5.36%
Democratic	Ann Kirkpatrick	1,031,245	40.75%	+5.97%
Green	Gary Swing	138,634	5.48%	+4.03%
Write-in		1,584	0.06%	N/A
Majority		328,022	12.96%	−11.33%
Total votes		2,530,730	100.0%	N/A
Republican hold				

By county

County	Ann Kirkpatrick Democratic		John McCain Republican		Others	
County	#	%	#	%	#	%
Apache	18,446	66.5%	7,944	28.6%	1,346	4.8%
Cochise	17,642	36.4%	27,636	57.0%	3,210	6.6%
Coconino	31,695	53.8%	24,031	40.8%	3,172	5.4%
Gila	6,701	31.2%	13,157	61.2%	1,637	7.6%
Graham	3,280	27.6%	7,728	65.0%	885	7.4%
Greenlee	1,189	36.7%	1,784	55.0%	268	8.3%
La Paz	1,629	28.4%	3,662	63.8%	450	7.8%
Maricopa	602,635	39.5%	842,425	55.2%	80,686	5.3%
Mohave	19,045	25.0%	50,486	66.3%	6,631	8.7%
Navajo	17,645	45.1%	18,760	47.9%	2,745	7.0%
Pima	202,213	49.4%	187,910	45.9%	19,614	4.8%
Pinal	45,402	35.8%	72,787	57.5%	8,493	6.7%
Santa Cruz	9,745	60.9%	5,635	35.2%	609	3.8%
Yavapai	34,527	31.3%	68,032	61.7%	7,708	7.0%
Yuma	19,451	39.3%	27,290	55.1%	2,764	5.6%
Totals	1,031,245	40.7%	1,359,267	53.7%	140,218	5.5%

Counties that flipped from Republican to Democratic

- Coconino (largest municipality: Flagstaff)
- Pima (largest municipality: Tucson)

==== By congressional district ====
McCain won seven of nine congressional districts, including two that elected Democrats.

District	McCain	Kirkpatrick	Representative
1st	48%	45%	Ann Kirkpatrick
1st	48%	45%	Tom O'Halleran
2nd	49%	46%	Martha McSally
3rd	40%	54%	Raúl Grijalva
4th	64%	28%	Paul Gosar
5th	63%	31%	Matt Salmon
5th	63%	31%	Andy Biggs
6th	59%	35%	David Schweikert
7th	32%	62%	Ruben Gallego
8th	61%	33%	Trent Franks
9th	48%	47%	Kyrsten Sinema
