= Kelli Ward =

American politician (born 1969)

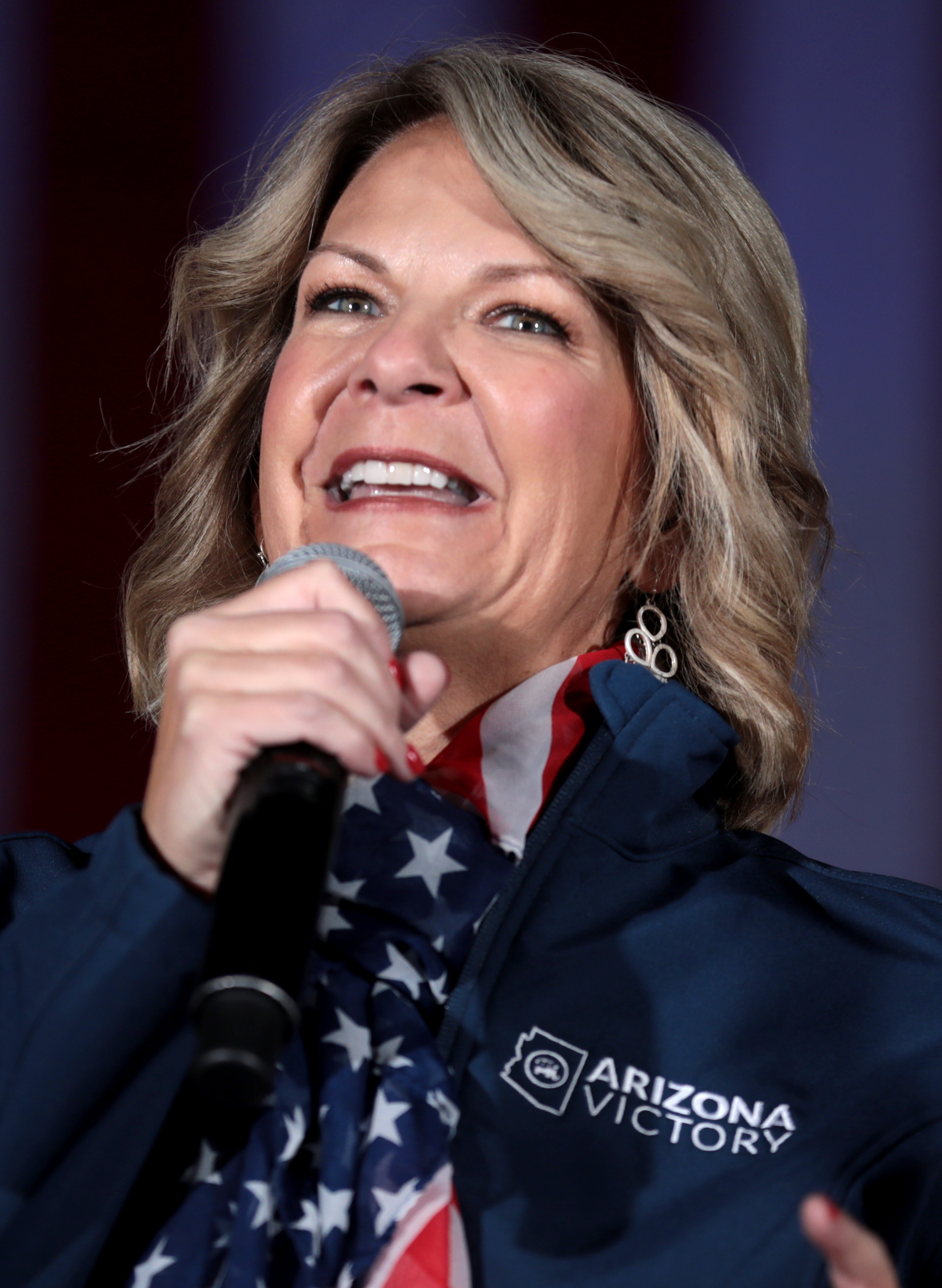
- Ward in 2022

Chair of the Arizona Republican Party
- In office January 26, 2019 – January 28, 2023
- Preceded by: Jonathan Lines
- Succeeded by: Jeff DeWit

Member of the Arizona Senate from the 5th district
- In office January 14, 2013 – December 15, 2015
- Preceded by: Ron Gould
- Succeeded by: Sue Donahue

Personal details
- Born: Kelli Kaznoski; January 25, 1969 (age 57) Fairmont, West Virginia, U.S.
- Party: Republican
- Children: 2
- Education: Duke University (BS); West Virginia School of Osteopathic Medicine (DO); A.T. Still University, Arizona (MPH)
- Website: Official website

Kelli Ward (née Kaznoski; born January 25, 1969) is an American politician who served as the chair of the Arizona Republican Party from 2019 to 2023. She previously served in the Arizona State Senate from 2013 to 2015.

She challenged incumbent Senator John McCain in the Republican primary for the United States Senate in 2016. Resigning from the state senate to focus on the race, Ward was defeated 51% to 39%. She ran in the 2018 Republican primary election for the U.S. Senate, initially against Jeff Flake, and then against Martha McSally, after Flake's decision not to seek re-election. Ward was defeated by McSally in the Republican primary.

She became chair of the Arizona Republican Party in 2019. After the 2020 United States presidential election, in which incumbent President Donald Trump lost in 25 states, including Arizona, she filed lawsuits seeking to nullify the state's election results. When she did this, she provided no evidence of wrongdoing in the election and by December 9, federal and state judges had dismissed all of her challenges against President-elect Joe Biden's victory in Arizona.

Ward was indicted by a grand jury in April 2024 as an alleged fake elector that falsely certified Donald Trump as the winner of the presidential election in Arizona.

== Early life and education ==
Kelli Ward was born Kelli Kaznoski in Fairmont, West Virginia. She graduated from Bridgeport High School in 1987, as the class valedictorian. Ward obtained a BS in psychology from Duke University in Durham, North Carolina, in 1991; a Doctor of Osteopathic Medicine (D.O.) degree from West Virginia School of Osteopathic Medicine in Lewisburg, West Virginia, in 1996; and a master's in public health (M.P.H.) from A.T. Still University of Health Sciences in Kirksville, Missouri, in 2005.

== Political career ==
=== Arizona Legislature ===
After Republican state senator Ron Gould left the Legislature and left the District 5 seat open, Ward won the three-way August 28, 2012, Republican primary in a highly contested election with 9,925 votes (42.2%) in a field that included state representative Nancy McLain. Ward won the November 6, 2012, general election with 49,613 votes (71.2%) against Democratic nominee Beth Weiser, who had run for a Senate seat in 2010.

In January 2014, Ward introduced the Arizona Fourth Amendment Protection Act, which would "ban the state from engaging in activities which help the NSA carry out their warrantless data-collection programs, or even make use of the information on a local level."

When Ward ran for re-election in November 2014, she was unopposed in both the primary and the general election.

=== U.S. Senate primary elections ===
==== 2016 ====
On July 14, 2015, Ward announced she would be entering the race for the Republican nomination for U.S. Senate in Arizona, against long-time incumbent John McCain, who was viewed by many political analysts as a top target of the Tea Party movement and by other Republican conservatives. On December 2, 2015, Ward announced that per Arizona's resign-to-run laws, she would resign from the state senate, effective December 15, in order to dedicate her time to running for the U.S. Senate. She was succeeded by Sue Donahue.

On July 11, 2016, Ward published an ad on her Facebook page saying that John McCain, her primary opponent for the 2016 Republican primary Senate election, was too friendly with Secretary Hillary Clinton. The ad said that they were nearly identical in their political beliefs, stating that "they agree" on issues such as "amnesty for illegal immigrants," opposing President George W. Bush's tax cuts, a gasoline tax, and "blocking conservative judges". The ad was an identical copy of a 2008 ad published by then-presidential candidate Mitt Romney, except that Ward replaced Romney's approval message at the end of the video with her own. Romney's lawyers contacted Ward and her campaign ordering her to cease any further use of the ad, stating Romney for President did not authorize any use of the ad. Ward's campaign did not dispute the similarities, telling reporters that "Mitt Romney got it right." Stephen Sebastian, Ward's spokesman, added "If the shoe fits, wear it. The substance is still the same. Some things never change."

In August 2016, Ward lost the primary to McCain.

==== 2018 ====
In October 2016, Ward announced that she would run in the 2018 Republican primary against incumbent Senator Jeff Flake (who later announced he would retire from the Senate). Ward criticized Flake for being "an open-borders, amnesty globalist," describing herself as "a build-the-wall, stop-illegal-immigration Americanist". In the primary, Ward faced U.S. Rep. Martha McSally and former Maricopa County sheriff Joe Arpaio. Arpaio and Ward were considered in contention for the same group of primary voters, as they are both highly conservative and staunchly pro-Trump, whereas McSally has a more moderate record.

In July 2017, after McCain was diagnosed with brain cancer, Ward said that she hoped that McCain would resign as quickly as possible. Ward said in a radio interview, "I hope that Senator McCain is going to look long and hard at this, that his family and his advisers are going to look at this, and they're going to advise him to step away as quickly as possible. So that the business of the country and the business of Arizona being represented at the federal level can move forward. ... We can't have until the 2018 election, waiting around to accomplish the Trump agenda, to secure the border and stop illegal immigration and repeal Obamacare and fix the economy and fix the veterans administration, all those things need to be done and we can't be at a standstill while we wait for John McCain to determine what he's going to do." Ward said that she hoped that Arizona's governor would consider appointing her to fill McCain's seat.

In August 2017, several events affected her campaign. She expressed her support for Trump's pardon of former Sheriff Joe Arpaio, who had been convicted of criminal contempt of court. Billionaire Robert Mercer—who had supported Ward's 2016 campaign—announced that he would donate $300,000 to a Super PAC supporting her 2018 run.

Also in that month, a video attack ad appeared accusing Ward of agreeing with the chemtrails conspiracy theory and referring to her as "Chemtrail Kelli". The advertisement was sponsored by the Senate Leadership Fund, aligned with Senate Majority Leader Mitch McConnell, and may have been the first time Ward came to the attention of "many outside Arizona" according to journalist Clare Malone, (an ad on the subject of chemtrails and Ward first appeared in the 2016 Senate race with McCain). PolitiFact rated the claim that Ward "hosted a town hall on 'chemtrail conspiracy theories' and is open to sponsoring chemtrails legislation" as "mostly false," and factcheck.org labeled the ad "misleading." Ward criticized the ad as demonstrating "sexism reserved for conservative women."

In October 2017, Ward was formally endorsed by former Senior Counselor to the President Steve Bannon in her 2018 campaign. Ward appeared together with Bannon to announce the endorsement. She was also endorsed by Great America PAC, which has been described as "an arm of Team Bannon". Bannon has said he believes Ward will help build a wall on the southern border of the US and repeal the Affordable Care Act. Ward later attempted to distance herself from Bannon in the aftermath of Bannon's public falling-out with Trump, whose endorsement Ward also sought, according to The Arizona Republic. In January 2018, Ward said: "Steve Bannon, I don't know that I actually really got a full endorsement from Steve ... He's not somebody that I've reached out and talked to in any way, shape, or form ... I am distancing myself from Steve Bannon." Ward was also endorsed by Sean Hannity, Laura Ingraham, Rep. Steve King, and Sen. Rand Paul.

In May 2018, Arpaio accused Ward of having enticed him to bow out of the Republican primary in exchange for lucrative speaking gigs with a pro-Trump group; the Ward campaign denied the accusation. The primary was described as "contentious", with Ward refusing to say whether she would support McSally in the general election were she to win the Republican nomination.

In June 2018, The Arizona Republic reported that Ward's ties to controversial and fringe conservative figures were undermining her campaign. During the campaign, Ward disavowed Paul Nehlen, an anti-Semitic and anti-Muslim commentator whom she had previously praised and described as a "friend". Ward praised Nehlen when he unsuccessfully sought to unseat House Speaker Paul Ryan in 2016. She appeared together with Nehlen on a number of occasions. Ward's husband, who was also a campaign surrogate, has promoted conspiracy theories about Seth Rich, Bill and Hillary Clinton murdering people, and John McCain cooperating with the Islamic State. In August 2018, Ward announced a campaign bus tour featuring Mike Cernovich, an alt-right media personality and conspiracy theorist. Cernovich had promoted the Pizzagate conspiracy theory, falsely alleging the existence of a widespread pedophile network within the Clinton campaign, whose existence Ward refused to deny. When Ward was asked if she agreed with Cernovich's beliefs, she said that she didn't know much about his views.

On August 24, 2018, the day of the announcement that McCain was ceasing medical treatment for terminal brain cancer, one of Ward's campaign staffers questioned on Facebook if the announcement "was a plan to take media attention off [Ward's] campaign" on "the kickoff day of Kelli Ward's bus tour". In response, Ward wrote: "I think they wanted to have a particular narrative that they hope is negative to me." McCain died hours after Ward's initial comment, which was deleted or removed from public viewing. Ward then made a followup comment (later also deleted or hidden) that the "media loves a narrative ... it's the media making something out of nothing."

Ward was defeated by Martha McSally in the August 28, 2018, Republican primary, receiving 28% of the vote to McSally's 52% and Arpaio's 19%.

=== Chair of Arizona Republican Party ===
In 2019, Ward was elected chair of Arizona Republican Party on a campaign platform of the Republican Party of Arizona supporting Republican presidential incumbent Donald Trump in 2020. She was reelected to the position in January 2021 by a margin of 42 votes in the second round of voting. Two months after the election, a couple of party activists sued Ward over her refusal to conduct an audit of the results of her reelection. The basis for the lawsuit is that the election was not conducted in view of the media, unlike standard election practice.

In April 2020, amid the COVID-19 pandemic, Ward encouraged protests against stay-at-home orders. She told protestors to dress up in scrubs and medical gear to imitate health care workers.

Early on election night 2020, the Associated Press and Fox News declared Biden the winner in Arizona as ballot counting continued. Trump and Ward sought to intervene, with Ward sending a text message to a Republican election official to say she had spoken with Trump and "We need you to stop the counting." She also asked the official to contact Trump attorney Sidney Powell, adding, "I know you don't want to be remembered as the guy who led the charge to certify a fraudulent election." Biden's lead shrank later in the night, though he still carried the state.

After Biden's victory, Trump spread falsehoods and conspiracy theories about election fraud, and Ward aided him in trying to subvert the election results. Throughout the period between the election and the inauguration of Joe Biden, Ward sent out fundraising mailings referencing a "stolen" election. Ward provided no evidence of wrongdoing in the election. The Arizona Republican Party dared Republicans to fight to the death for Trump.

When Ward's legal challenges were dismissed, Arizona Republicans raised concerns that the political division between Ward and Doug Ducey, who had acknowledged Biden's win in Arizona, would damage the party's future electoral prospects.

As Trump and his allies attempted to overturn the 2020 presidential election, on January 5, 2021, dozens of lawmakers from key states, including Arizona, asked Vice President Mike Pence to delay final certification of Biden's election for 10 days so that legislatures in those states could reconsider their earlier certifications. During the storming of the United States Capitol on January 6, 2021, which forced lawmakers to evacuate, Ward wrote on Twitter, "Congress is adjourned. Send the elector choice back to the legislatures." She also suggested without evidence that the Capitol rioters were fakes who were trying to undermine Trump supporters.

In 2021, Ward pushed false claims about the Arizona election in 2020. She and her husband were among eleven Republicans to sign a fraudulent certificate of ascertainment declaring Trump had won Arizona's electors, when actually Joe Biden had; Republicans in other key states also signed such documents. The Arizona Republican Party posted video of the signing on Twitter. Ward and her husband were among many Republicans in those states to receive federal subpoenas in June 2022. Ward fought a January 6 committee subpoena of her phone records to the United States Supreme Court, which denied her challenge in November 2022. She then appeared before the committee but pleaded the Fifth Amendment privilege against self-incrimination.

Following poor results in the 2022 midterm elections, in which Republican candidates Blake Masters, Kari Lake, and Mark Finchem were defeated, Republican gubernatorial candidate Karrin Taylor Robson called for Ward's resignation. Robson called Ward's tenure an "unmitigated disaster" for the Arizona Republican Party.

Ward's term as Chair of the Arizona Republican Party ended on January 28, 2023, and she was succeeded by former Arizona Treasurer Jeff DeWit.

=== 2024 criminal charges ===
On April 24, 2024, Ward was indicted by an Arizona grand jury for alleged involvement in the Trump fake electors plot. She was charged along with seventeen other Arizona Republicans and Trump associates with engaging in a conspiracy aimed at "preventing the lawful transfer of the presidency of the United States." According to the charging documents, Ward and the others schemed to prevent the lawful transfer of the presidency to Joseph Biden by attempting to have the Arizona electoral votes be counted for Donald Trump. The criminal indictment includes a screenshot from Ward's twitter account showing her comments about the Arizona presidential election and also includes a photo of Ward in Washington, D.C., talking to Donald Trump on December 1, 2020. The criminal indictment refers to Ward talking to "Unindicted Coconspirator 1" while the photo says she is talking to "POTUS". At the time, POTUS was Donald Trump. On May 21, 2024, Ward, her husband Michael and nine others pled not guilty after being arraigned.

On November 10, 2025, President Donald Trump issued a pardon to Ward and her coconspirators. This pardon only protects her from future federal charges. At the time of the pardon, there were no pending federal charges. The investigation and criminal charges by Arizona Attorney General Kris Mayes remain as the president does not have the power to pardon for state charges.

== Personal life ==
While studying osteopathic medicine, Ward met her husband Michael, who served in the Arizona Air National Guard. They have two children.

== Electoral history ==
2019 Arizona Republican Party chair election
| Party | Candidate | Votes | % |
|---|---|---|---|
| Republican | Kelli Ward | 633 | 51.72 |
| Republican | Jonathan Lines | 526 | 42.97 |
| Republican | Doyle Shamley | 65 | 5.31 |
| Total votes | | 1,224 | 100.00 |

Republican primary for the 2018 United States Senate election in Arizona
| Party | Candidate | Votes | % |
|---|---|---|---|
| Republican | Martha McSally | 357,626 | 54.57 |
| Republican | Kelli Ward | 180,926 | 27.61 |
| Republican | Joe Arpaio | 116,555 | 17.79 |
| Write-in | | 191 | 0.03 |
| Total votes | | 655,298 | 100.00 |

Republican primary for the 2016 United States Senate election in Arizona
| Party | Candidate | Votes | % |
|---|---|---|---|
| Republican | John McCain | 302,532 | 51.16 |
| Republican | Kelli Ward | 235,988 | 39.91 |
| Republican | Alex Meluskey | 31,159 | 5.27 |
| Republican | Clair Van Steenwyk | 21,476 | 3.63 |
| Republican | Sean Webster (write-in) | 175 | 0.03 |
| Total votes | | 591,330 | 100.00 |

2014 Arizona Senate general election, 5th legislative district
| Party | Candidate | Votes | % |
|---|---|---|---|
| Republican | Kelli Ward (incumbent) | 38,507 | 100.00 |
| Total votes | | 38,507 | 100.00 |
| Republican hold | | | |

Republican primary for the 2014 Arizone Senate election, 5th legislative district
| Party | Candidate | Votes | % |
|---|---|---|---|
| Republican | Kelli Ward (incumbent) | 19,439 | 100.00 |
| Total votes | | 19,439 | 100.00 |

2012 Arizona Senate general election, 5th legislative district
| Party | Candidate | Votes | % |
|---|---|---|---|
| Republican | Kelli Ward | 49,613 | 71.23 |
| Democratic | Beth Weisser | 20,040 | 28.77 |
| Total votes | | 69,653 | 100.00 |
| Republican hold | | | |

Republican primary for the 2012 Arizona Senate election, 5th legislative district
| Party | Candidate | Votes | % |
|---|---|---|---|
| Republican | Kelli Ward | 9,925 | 42.20 |
| Republican | Sam Scarmardo | 7,832 | 33.30 |
| Republican | Nancy McLain | 5,762 | 24.50 |
| Total votes | | 23,519 | 100.00 |

Arizona Senate
| Preceded by Ron Gould | Member from the 5th district 2013–2015 | Succeeded by Sue Donahue |
Party political offices
| Preceded by Jonathan Lines | Chair of the Arizona Republican Party; 2019–2023 | Succeeded by Jeff DeWit |
