= Robert Graham (Arizona politician) =

American businessman

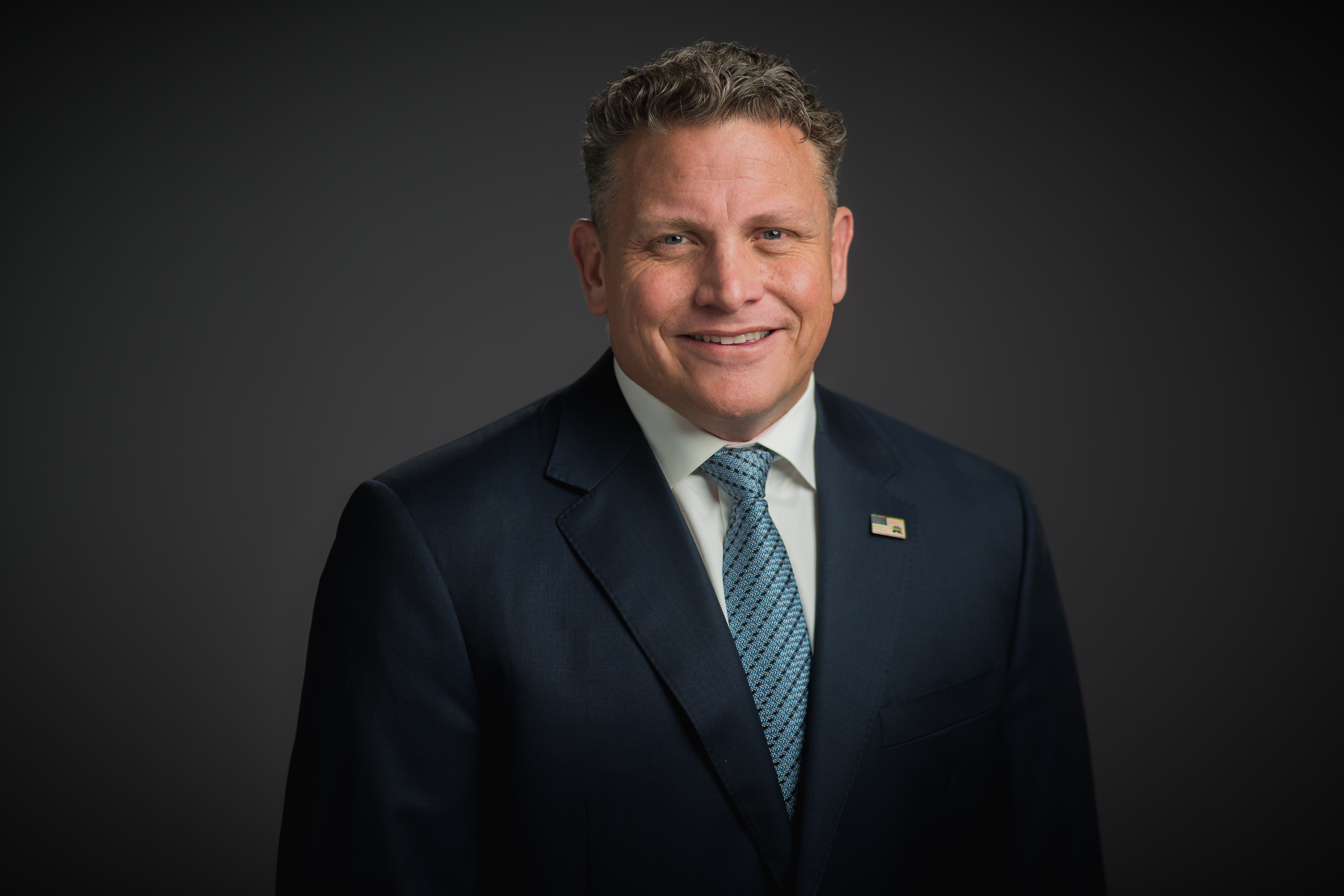

Chair of the Arizona Republican Party
- In office January 26, 2013 – January 28, 2017
- Preceded by: Tom Morrisey
- Succeeded by: Jonathan Lines

Personal details
- Born: January 9, 1972 (age 53); Fort Walton Beach, Florida, U.S.
- Political party: Republican
- Spouse: Julia S. Graham
- Parent(s): Dr. Robert J Graham (Father) and Ann S Graham (Mother)
- Education: Arizona State University (BS, MBA)

Robert S. Graham (born January 9, 1972) is an American entrepreneur, business owner, author, and the former chairman of the Arizona Republican Party (AZ GOP), serving from 2013 to 2017.

== Early life and education ==
Graham was born in Fort Walton Beach, Florida, in 1972. His father was an Air Force Major, and the Graham family moved to the Kincheloe Air Force Base in Michigan, where they lived until the end of the Cold War.

Graham attended high school in East Lansing, Michigan. He then transferred to Arizona State University, where he received a Bachelor of Sciences in Global Business Management and Finance and graduated cum laude. For his entrepreneurial success and service to ASU, Graham was awarded "Distinguished Alumnus" from the School of Global Management and Leadership. He graduated from the Thunderbird School of Global Management in 2013 and received a Masters of Business Administration in Global Management.

== Career ==
In 1997, Graham started working as the director of marketing for Gold and Associates. He then worked as the vice president of business development for CUE Financial until 2001, where he increased the company's national market share. From 2001 until 2004, he worked as a private wealth advisor for Merrill Lynch. In 2004, he left Merrill Lynch and founded RG Capital, LLC and iNation, LLC. iNation is a Scottsdale-based data and digital technology company (SaaS), with a customer relationship management (CRM) tool designed for businesses and professionals worldwide, and Graham served as the founder and chairman until he sold the business in 2008 to a private equity firm.

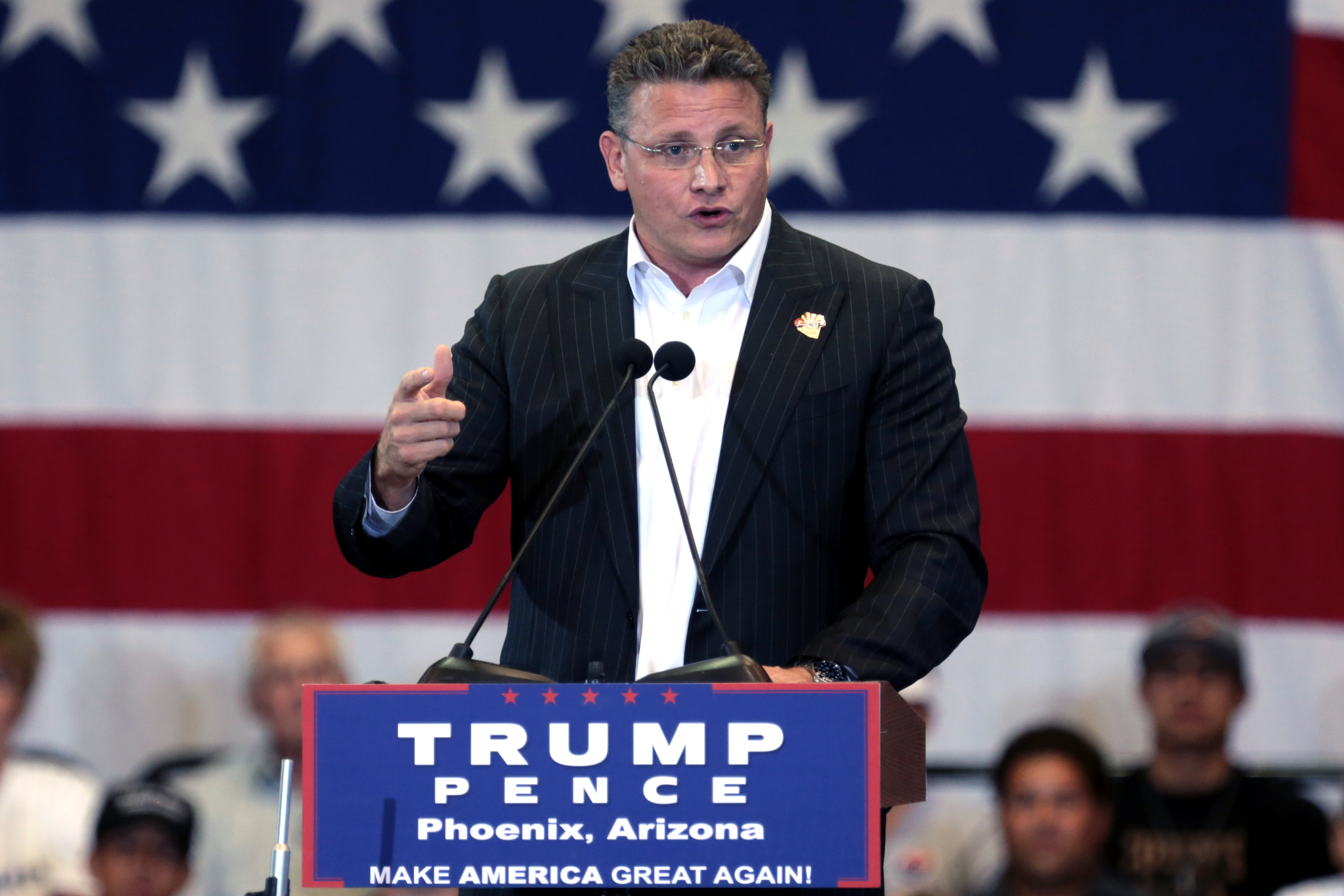
Graham speaking at a campaign rally for Donald Trump, August 2016

Graham was elected chairman of the Arizona Republican Party in January 2013, when he received 70% of the vote. His primary duty as chairman is to maintain and grow the Republican Party in Arizona. He has been recognized nationally for the successful 2014 midterm elections in Arizona, on account of Republicans winning every statewide office.

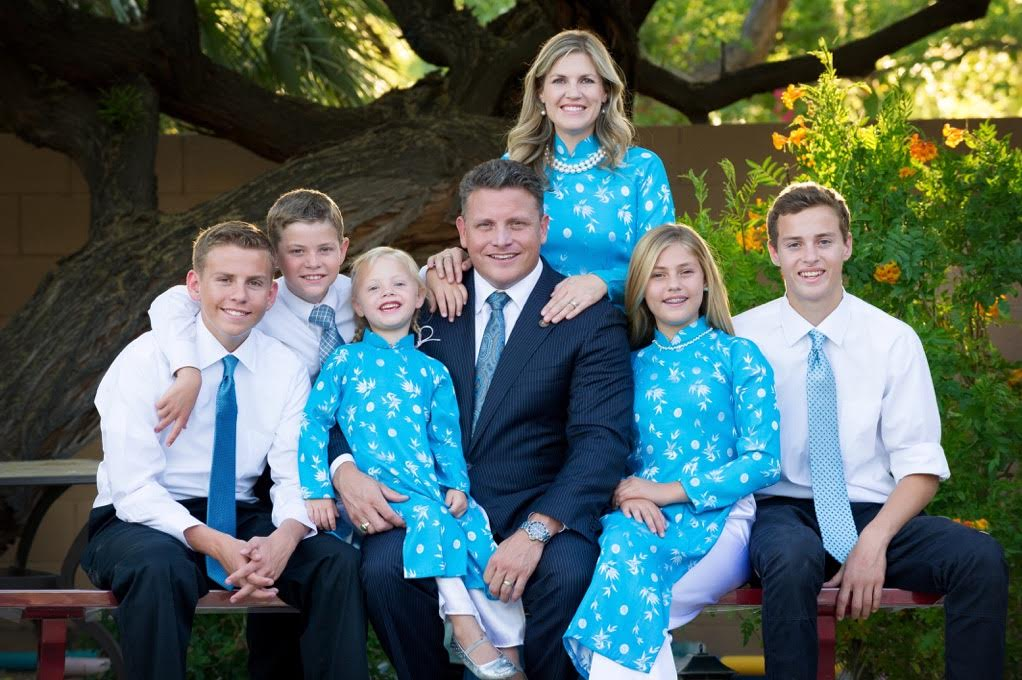
The Graham Family

In January 2015, Graham was re-elected as the chairman of the Arizona Republican Party, receiving 82% of the vote, a 12% increase from his previous election. Graham is known in the Arizona Republican Party for his outreach to minority communities, and in 2015, Governor Doug Ducey and the State of Arizona appointed him to the Arizona Commission of African-American Affairs. Beginning in 2013, Graham has worked with Asian, African American, Latino, and Tribal coalitions.

== Publications ==
In 2010, Graham published his first book Job Killers: The American Dream in Reverse. The book explains how labor unions can ruin jobs and shrink the economy.

== Personal life ==
Graham has been married to his wife Julia since 1997. They have six children together.

Party political offices
Preceded by Tom Morrissey	Chair of the Arizona Republican Party; 2013–2017	Succeeded by Jonathan Lines
