= Organization of Iranian American Communities =

Anti-Iranian government advocacy group

- Abbreviation: OIAC
- Formation: 2012; 14 years ago
- Headquarters: Washington, D.C., U.S.
- Political Director: Majid Sadeghpour
- Website: www.oiac.org

The Organization of Iranian American Communities (OIAC) is an organization in the United States.

While the OIAC maintains a position of "nonpartisonship" in its mandate, critics of the organisation have accused it of being allied with the People's Mojahedin Organization of Iran, or the Mojahedin-e Khalq (MEK), which advocates the overthrow of the government of Iran.

== History ==
According to its Political Director, Majid Sadeghpour, OIAC was established in 1997 and expanded in 2012 through a collaboration of groups from 40 states. The organization advocates for a secular, democratic government in Iran and supports the separation of religion and state. Its stated mission includes the promotion of human rights and the defense of civil liberties for Iranian citizens.

OIAC states that it supports the establishment of a secular, democratic republic in Iran and opposes both foreign military intervention and a policy of economic appeasement toward the current government. The organization advocates for the "10-point plan" proposed by Maryam Rajavi, which includes calls for gender equality, the abolition of the death penalty, and a non-nuclear Iran. OIAC holds annual demonstrations near the United Nations in New York and has organized rallies at the White House to express "solidarity with protesters in Iran". Independent reporting has described the organization as an all-volunteer advocacy group closely linked to the Mujahedin-e Khalq (MEK). According to investigative editor Joanne Stocker, OIAC has played a significant role in securing bipartisan support in the United States for the Iranian opposition by presenting the movement as a democratic, human rights-focused alternative to the current government in Tehran.

In 2018, U.S. federal prosecutors alleged that an agent of the Iranian government conducted surveillance on an OIAC convention in Washington, D.C., as part of a plot to gather intelligence on Iranian opposition activists.

== Leadership ==
OIAC is led by political director Majid Sadeghpour. OIAC has a 3 members on the board of directors, 8 members on the board of advisors., and 7 members in the governing body.

== See also ==
- Iranian Americans
- Iranian diaspora
- Iran–United States relations
