= Great Peace March for Global Nuclear Disarmament =

1986 protest in the United States

The Great Peace March for Global Nuclear Disarmament was a 1986 protest march that crossed the length of the United States to raise awareness of nuclear proliferation and to advocate for complete, verifiable elimination of nuclear weapons from the earth. The Great Peace March consisted of hundreds of people, mostly but not exclusively Americans, who left Los Angeles, California on March 1, 1986. Despite financial difficulties which drove the march's organizers into bankruptcy shortly after it began, the marchers themselves took control of the event and continued onward. They successfully completed the full route of 3,700 mi (6,000 km) and arrived in Washington, D.C., on November 15, 1986.

== The march ==
The Great Peace March was conceived by Los Angeles businessman David Mixner, who formed People Reaching Out for Peace (PRO-Peace), a non-profit organization, to fund the trek. Mixner, an experienced political consultant, began planning for the event in 1984 after his work for the Gary Hart presidential campaign ended in failure, and announced his plans for the march at the Los Angeles Press Club in April 1985.

PRO-Peace hoped to attract corporate sponsors to provide funding for the march, akin to other major charity events of the mid-1980s like Live Aid, Farm Aid, and Hands Across America. However, the issue of nuclear disarmament proved to be too politically controversial for most of the companies PRO-Peace approached, and fundraising fell well below expectations.

Beginning in early February, marchers gathered in a park in Reseda, California to await the beginning of the journey. The march was supposed to begin with a star-studded benefit concert at the Los Angeles Memorial Coliseum on March 1, but this plan had to be scaled down after PRO-Peace struggled to convince major artists to appear for free. The Coliseum still served as the starting point of the march on that date, but the send-off ceremonies were moved a few miles down the road to City Hall, where Mayor Tom Bradley and numerous Hollywood actors wished the marchers well and Melissa Manchester, Holly Near, and Mr. Mister performed on a temporary stage. The 1,200 marchers – about a quarter of the 5,000 that PRO-Peace had hoped to attract – then proceeded to their first overnight campsite on the California State University, Los Angeles campus.

Despite large and well-publicized contributions from celebrities including Barbra Streisand, who gave the march half the proceeds from her rendition of "Somewhere", and Paul Newman, PRO-Peace had raised less than $4 million by the time the march began. It was estimated that the march's total expenses would be about $21 million, nearly half of which would be needed just to feed the marchers along the way. Caltrans required event organizers to purchase an insurance policy covering at least $5 million in damages before the marchers would be allowed to travel along state highways, but PRO-Peace was unable to afford this much insurance coverage. With logistical problems cropping up and uncertainty as to whether they would even be allowed to cross the Cajon Pass out of San Bernardino, over 200 participants dropped out of the march in the first two days, before it had even left the Los Angeles suburbs.

After March 3, however, the group of marchers remained stable at a population of roughly 975 or 980. Although it was impossible to exit San Bernardino to the north without using state roadways, the insurance problem was avoided by having buses transport the marchers much of the way to Hesperia. Six marchers were allowed to follow the entire route on foot to complete the symbolic link.

On March 10, the marchers arrived at a campsite eight miles south of Barstow, planning to hold a peace rally at Barstow Community College the next morning and then proceed through the city and further into the desert. However, the college refused to host the rally without liability insurance, while cold and heavy rains incapacitated several marchers and made further progress impossible. With serious concerns about the safety of marchers in the Mojave Desert and PRO-Peace almost $500,000 in debt, the march remained stalled outside of Barstow for several days.

As supplies ran low, several hundred people left the march. On March 14, Mixner announced to the remaining marchers that PRO-Peace would fold due to its growing debt. The next day, marchers established a new non-profit organization, The Great Peace March for Nuclear Disarmament Inc., which took control of as much of PRO-Peace's facilities and equipment as possible, while other equipment was seized and repossessed by creditors. The roughly 500 participants that remained then walked 10 miles to a BMX track on the north side of Barstow, which already had its own liability insurance, ensuring that the marchers would not have to pay that cost themselves. The group began raising funds to continue onward, and in the meantime offered acts of community service to the city of Barstow. The 300 marchers that remained after two weeks in Barstow left the city on March 28 to proceed through the desert toward Las Vegas. Along the way, they democratically elected a "city council" and a board of directors for the new organization.

The march arrived at the Nevada state line near Primm on April 4, but marchers were forced to wait again while organizers searched for campsites in Nevada they could use. During this time, about 100 of the 320 participants were driven to the Nevada Test Site to join the ongoing protests against the Mighty Oak nuclear test, where dozens were arrested for trespassing alongside Daniel Ellsberg and members of Greenpeace. The remaining marchers ceremonially crossed the state border on April 8, although both the California and Nevada highway patrol agencies said their campsite for the past few days had been just within Nevada all along. On April 10, the march reached Sunset Park in Paradise, 19 days behind schedule. The arrival in Las Vegas Valley coincided with a $25,000 donation to the march from Paul Newman, a substantial boost for an organization that was spending $3,000 a day. Marchers walked down the Las Vegas Strip on April 12, then spent the night staying at people's homes on the northeast side of the city before resuming their journey across the desert. Most of those who were arrested at the Test Site were released from jail after six days and rejoined the march northeast of Las Vegas.

Briefly crossing the Arizona Strip, a group of marchers traveled to Kingman and received a proclamation in their honor from Arizona governor Bruce Babbitt. With the help of a rabbi from Las Vegas, the marchers held a Passover seder in Hurricane, Utah. On April 24, two marchers who broke from the group to hitchhike to Zion National Park were in a truck that rolled over, killing 24-year-old marcher Cynthia Carlson.

The Utah Department of Transportation warned marchers against trying to cross the unpopulated San Rafael Desert on foot, due to the lack of facilities, the absence of shoulders along the road, and the potential risks of contracting hoof-and-mouth disease and giardia. March organizers agreed to be bused from Cove Fort to Salt Lake City, giving them an opportunity to stage public events and raise money in a major city the marchers otherwise would not have visited, before returning to the originally planned route at Cisco, Utah. This detour also allowed marchers to make up for some of the time they had lost in Barstow. Approximately 50 participants broke off from the main group near Beaver on April 29 and began to march eastward, determined to cross the country on foot without the approval of the march organization or Utah state authorities. These marchers continued until they reached Cisco and completed the cross-country link. Part of this group then became an "evaluation team" which lagged a few days behind the main march, surveying local residents to determine what effect the march had had on the community. A similar group covered the route through De Beque Canyon east of Grand Junction, Colorado, which the main group could not follow because of road construction on the narrow alignment of I-70, as well as through Glenwood Canyon.

The marchers celebrated Mother's Day by having those among them who were mothers and their children lead the walk to Parachute, Colorado. On May 22, the march crossed the Continental Divide at Loveland Pass, thus climbing to the highest elevation of their cross-country route at 11,992 feet. May 22 had been planned as a rest day, but marchers crossed the divide a day early to avoid an incoming snowstorm. In Lawson, Colorado, marchers met with poet Allen Ginsberg, who joined some members of the group in a protest at Rocky Flats Plant. Also while in Lawson, marchers joined hands with local residents for "Feet Across America", staged at the same time as the nationwide Hands Across America event, which did not pass through Colorado. Along the way into Denver, marchers met with Colorado Lieutenant Governor Nancy Dick and Congresswoman Pat Schroeder, and stayed at Red Rocks Amphitheatre with folk singer Pete Seeger, who performed for the group. In Denver, two marchers who had fallen in love along the trek in California were married at a local church. A rally at the Colorado State Capitol was joined by thousands of local residents, with another performance by Holly Near, and mayor Federico Peña praised the undertaking.

Having crossed through the Rocky Mountains, the flatter terrain of eastern Colorado and Nebraska allowed marchers to pick up the pace, averaging more than 20 miles a day compared to the originally planned 15 miles per day, in the hopes of catching up with the original itinerary for the march. On June 6, marchers hiked more than 25 miles from Fort Morgan to Merino in a single day. In Nebraska, marchers were met with a severe heatwave, and some suffered sunburns and risked heat stroke, unused to the humid conditions after three months in the arid West. The march crossed the 100th meridian, often considered the dividing line between west and east, on June 19. That same day, actress Betty Thomas joined the march. The main body of the march reached Lincoln, Nebraska on June 29, two days earlier than the original schedule had projected.

Having caught back up with their planned itinerary, the marchers were able to honor their previous commitment to spend the Independence Day holiday in the Omaha area working with local peace groups. They had intended to spend July 4 staying on the campus of Creighton Preparatory School, but the school revoked its permission after learning that some marchers were planning to engage in civil disobedience that included entering restricted areas of Offutt Air Force Base, as part of a protest planned by other groups that was not sanctioned by the march organization. Having lost their Omaha campsite, the marchers crossed into Iowa two days early and spent the holiday at Lake Manawa State Park in Council Bluffs. About 100 of the 240 protesters arrested for trespassing at Offutt on July 6 were march participants; all were released shortly afterward.

Baba Ram Dass spoke to the assembled marchers in Treynor, Iowa. Pete Seeger joined the marchers again at nearby Lake Anita State Park, marking the march's 2,000th mile traveled from Los Angeles. A rally at the Iowa Statehouse in Des Moines was joined by gubernatorial candidate Lowell Junkins and secretary of state Mary Jane Odell. Approaching Davenport, marchers met with a group of Soviet and American citizens traveling down the Mississippi River on the historic Delta Queen steamboat as part of the Mississippi Peace Cruise. The march crossed the Mississippi River into Illinois on August 1. A group of marchers were arrested that morning after attempting to enter the Rock Island Arsenal, and were immediately released.

Marchers commemorated the 41st anniversary of the atomic bombing of Hiroshima on August 6 by freezing in place in Dixon, Illinois, the hometown of then-president Ronald Reagan. A similar observance was held three days later in Hinckley to mark the anniversary of the bombing of Nagasaki. In Chicago, marchers met with mayor Harold Washington at the Buckingham Fountain in Grant Park, although they were not allowed to camp in Grant Park as they had originally hoped due to a city ordinance passed after the 1968 Democratic National Convention protests. A rally in Lincoln Park was joined by Betty Thomas and Studs Terkel.

In northern Indiana, marchers were offered a potluck supper by local groups of Amish, who shared their desire for peace. The march route was planned to follow the Edison Bridge across Sandusky Bay in Ohio, but organizers were denied permission to cross the bridge days before their arrival due to the lack of shoulders along the span. Instead, marchers were ferried across the bay. Ohio governor Richard Celeste, senator Howard Metzenbaum, and congressman Louis Stokes met with marchers in Cleveland. Roughly half of the marchers detoured from the official route in Aurora to visit Kent State University, site of the infamous 1970 fatal shootings of peace protesters.

In Pittsburgh, marchers joined unemployed steelworkers for a rally outside U.S. Steel's recently closed Homestead Steel Works. On October 4, two marchers were struck by a car while marching outside of Bedford, Pennsylvania, marking the first such accident of the march up to that point. Marchers met with Mitch Snyder and Philip Berrigan in Fort Loudon, and attended a Ralph Nader rally for Bob Edgar in Shippensburg.

On October 23, marchers crossed the George Washington Bridge into New York City, completing the cross-country phase of their journey. Some participants appeared that morning on The Phil Donahue Show. A rally at the United Nations Building, coinciding with United Nations Day, was joined by Yoko Ono and Rev. Jesse Jackson.

The march visited Philadelphia on November 2 and 3, on the eve of the midterm elections, and were met by mayor Wilson Goode, Maggie Kuhn, and Graham Nash. Documents relating to the march were donated to the Swarthmore College Peace Collection, after marchers stayed the night on their campus just outside Philadelphia.

As originally planned, marchers arrived in Washington, D.C. on November 14. The march culminated with rallies in the capital on November 15, in Lafayette Square across from the White House (although President Reagan was at Camp David at the time) and finishing at the Lincoln Memorial. They were lauded by some prominent politicians, including Senator Tom Harkin, Representative Ed Markey, and Washington mayor Marion Barry. Harkin offered the marchers a letter of congratulations signed by 13 other senators, including Ted Kennedy and future presidential candidate John Kerry. Equipment and leftover supplies from the march were sold off beginning on November 17, with proceeds going to fund future anti-war efforts. A final unofficial protest action was held that same day, with participants blocking doors to the James V. Forrestal Building, headquarters of the United States Department of Energy overseeing the nation's nuclear weapons program.

== Activities ==
The traveling encampment of marchers was referred to as "Peace City", which had an elected city council as well as a ceremonial mayor, Diane Clark. In many of the cities the march passed through, a "Keys-and-Trees" ceremony was held, in which the local mayor would award the marchers a key to the city, Clark would reciprocate by offering a key to Peace City, and a commemorative "peace tree" or "peace pole" would be planted. The peace tree ceremony was introduced to the march by activist Caroline Killeen, who had previously cycled across the country planting trees as she went.

A lantern containing a flame derived from the eternal flame at Hiroshima Peace Memorial Park was carried along the march by members of Asian and Pacific Americans for Nuclear Awareness. Like the original flame in Japan, it was to be extinguished only when all nuclear weapons on Earth were dismantled and the threat of nuclear war was gone.

Among the amenities provided to marchers was a bookmobile which also served as a schoolhouse for the children that participated in the march, formally known as the Peace Academy Center for Education. The bookmobile received donations of books from libraries in the towns that the march passed through.

One of the most notable marchers was actor Robert Blake, who vowed at the beginning of the march to walk all the way to Washington. While Blake did not remain with the march for its entire duration, breaking from the group at times to drive back to Los Angeles and rejoining them later, he later described the march as a transformative experience that allowed him to escape a faltering career in Hollywood and to come to terms with the abuse he had received as a child actor.

== Route ==

Below are listed the official rest stops taken by the main body of the Great Peace March each night. Throughout the duration of the march, some participants stayed elsewhere, often helping to make preparations for future stops or soliciting donations in nearby cities. Wherever the bulk of the marchers were unable to continue the journey on foot due to safety concerns, a smaller group of "Spirit Walkers" stayed behind to walk along an alternative route and complete the symbolic link, eventually catching back up with the larger march.

The national map shows only major stops along the route where marchers camped for multiple nights, typically in or near large cities. The regional maps below highlight these same major stops with a larger marker and labeled with the place name, while all of the nightly stops are shown with the default marker and no label. Some locations are approximate, particularly those far from any named settlement. All markers also serve as links to the article on the place in question, except where no such article exists, when they are clicked on or moused over.

=== California ===
- Before March 1: Preparations at Sepulveda Basin Park, Reseda
- March 1: Los Angeles Memorial Coliseum to California State University, Los Angeles
- March 2: Cal State LA to Santa Fe Dam Recreation Area, Irwindale
- March 3: Irwindale to Claremont (no campsite)
- March 4: Claremont to Glen Helen Regional Park, Devore Heights
- March 5–6: Resting in Devore Heights
- March 7: Devore Heights to Hesperia Lake Park in Hesperia (traveling mostly by bus)
- March 8: Hesperia to Stoddard Wells Road near Bell Mountain (Mojave Desert)
- March 9: Resting near Bell Mountain
- March 10: Along Stoddard Wells Road to a site near Barstow
- March 11–15: Resting near Barstow (financial difficulties prevented further progress)
- March 16: Moved to new campsite at Barstow Rotary BMX, Barstow
- March 17–27: Resting in Barstow
- March 28: Barstow to private property in Yermo
- March 29: Yermo to site near Albert Mountain
- March 30: Albert Mountain to near Afton
- March 31: Near Afton to near Silver Lake
- April 1: Near Silver Lake to Riggs Wash near Baker
- April 2: Riggs Wash to Shadow Valley near Mountain Pass, California
- April 3: Resting in Shadow Valley (unplanned break due to tractor-trailer breakdown)
- April 4: Shadow Valley to California state line at Primm, Nevada
- April 5–7: Resting at state border near Primm

=== Nevada ===
- April 8: Primm to federal land near Jean
- April 9: Near Jean to Sloan
- April 10: Sloan to Sunset Park in Las Vegas
- April 11: Resting in Sunset Park
- April 12: Sunset Park to Heritage Hall (no campsite)
- April 13: Las Vegas to BLM land near Nellis Air Force Base
- April 14: Nellis to Moapa River Indian Reservation
- April 15: Moapa River to BLM land southwest of Glendale
- April 16: Southwest of Glendale to BLM land northeast of Glendale
- April 17: Near Glendale to BLM land near Mesquite
- April 18: Resting near Mesquite
- April 19: Into the city of Mesquite

=== Arizona ===
- April 20: Mesquite to Littlefield, Arizona

=== Utah ===
- April 21: Littlefield to Shivwits Indian Reservation
- April 22: Shivwits reservation to Green Valley, St. George
- April 23: Resting in Green Valley
- April 24: St. George to Harrisburg Junction, Hurricane
- April 25: Hurricane to Pintura
- April 26: Pintura to Kanarraville
- April 27: Kanarraville to Summit
- April 28: Summit to Paragonah
- April 29: Paragonah to near Beaver
- April 30: Resting near Beaver
- May 1: Beaver to Pine Creek Grove
- May 2: Pine Creek Grove to Cove Fort
- May 3: Driven from Cove Fort to Salt Lake City
- May 4: Driven from Salt Lake City to Cisco, Utah
- May 5: Resting in Cisco

=== Colorado ===
- May 6: Cisco to Rabbit Valley
- May 7: Rabbit Valley to near Fruita
- May 8: Near Fruita to Grand Junction (no campsite)
- May 9: Resting in Grand Junction
- May 10: Grand Junction to Palisade, then bused to De Beque
- May 11: De Beque to Parachute
- May 12: Parachute to Lions Park, Rifle
- May 13: Rifle to New Castle
- May 14: New Castle to Glenwood Springs
- May 15: Resting in Glenwood Springs
- May 16: Driven from Glenwood Springs to Gypsum, then walked to Eagle
- May 17: Eagle to Edwards
- May 18: Edwards to Vail (no campsite)
- May 19: Resting in Vail
- May 20: Vail to Copper Mountain
- May 21: Copper Mountain to Dillon
- May 22: Dillon to Herman Gulch
- May 23: Herman Gulch to Lawson
- May 24–25: Resting in Lawson
- May 26: Lawson to Chief Hosa Campground, Golden
- May 27: Resting in Golden
- May 28: Golden to Red Rocks Amphitheatre, Morrison
- May 29: Red Rocks to Confluence Park, Denver
- May 30–31: Resting in Denver
- June 1: Denver to campsite near Commerce City (site now part of Denver International Airport)
- June 2: Commerce City to Lochbuie
- June 3: Lochbuie to Roggen
- June 4: Roggen to Wiggins
- June 5: Wiggins to Riverside Park, Fort Morgan
- June 6: Fort Morgan to Merino
- June 7: Merino to Sterling
- June 8: Resting in Sterling
- June 9: Sterling to Proctor
- June 10: Proctor to Sedgwick

=== Nebraska ===
- June 11: Sedgwick to Big Springs
- June 12: Big Springs to Keith County Fairgrounds, Ogallala
- June 13: Ogallala to Paxton
- June 14: Paxton to Sutherland
- June 15: Sutherland to Cody Park, North Platte
- June 16: Resting in North Platte
- June 17: North Platte to Brady
- June 18: Brady to Camp Rockhaven, Willow Island
- June 19: Willow Island to Lexington
- June 20: Lexington to Elm Creek
- June 21: Elm Creek to Buffalo County Fairgrounds, Kearney
- June 22: Kearney to Platte Valley Academy, Shelton
- June 23: Shelton to Fonner Park, Grand Island
- June 24: Resting in Grand Island
- June 25: Grand Island to Hamilton County Fairgrounds, Aurora
- June 26: Aurora to York
- June 27: York to sheep pasture near Tamora
- June 28: Tamora to Pawnee Lake State Recreation Area near Lincoln
- June 29: Pawnee Lake to city-owned land near Oak Lake Park, Lincoln
- June 30: Resting in Lincoln
- July 1: Lincoln to Ashland
- July 2: Ashland to private land near Prairie Queen Lake Recreation Area, Papillion

=== Iowa ===
- July 3: Papillion to Lake Manawa State Park, Council Bluffs
- July 4–6: Resting at Lake Manawa
- July 7: Lake Manawa to farm field near Treynor
- July 8: Treynor to Chautauqua Park, Oakland
- July 9: Oakland to Cold Springs State Park near Lewis
- July 10: Cold Springs to Lake Anita State Park, Anita
- July 11: Resting at Lake Anita
- July 12: Lake Anita to Adair
- July 13: Adair to Stuart
- July 14: Stuart to Bear Creek Friends Meetinghouse, Earlham
- July 15: Earlham to Dallas County Fairgrounds, Adel
- July 16: Adel to Living History Farms, Urbandale
- July 17–18: Resting at Living History Farms
- July 19: Urbandale to Mitchellville
- July 20: Mitchellville to Woodland Park, Newton
- July 21: Newton to Grinnell College, Grinnell
- July 22: Grinnell to Brooklyn-Guernsey-Malcom High School, Brooklyn
- July 23: Brooklyn to Ladora
- July 24: Ladora to South Amana Pond, South Amana
- July 25: South Amana to private land in Oxford
- July 26: Oxford to Northwest Junior High School, Coralville
- July 27: Resting in Coralville
- July 28: Coralville to Scattergood School, West Branch
- July 29: West Branch to Rural Electric Cooperative grounds, Wilton
- July 30: Wilton to Walcott Intermediate School, Walcott
- July 31: Walcott to Centennial Park, Davenport

=== Illinois ===
- August 1: Davenport to Northeast Park, East Moline
- August 2: Resting in East Moline
- August 3: East Moline to Hillsdale
- August 4: Hillsdale to Land's End campground, Prophetstown
- August 5: Prophetstown to Sterling
- August 6: Sterling to Dixon
- August 7: Dixon to near Amboy
- August 8: Amboy to private land in Shabbona
- August 9: Shabbona to Hinckley
- August 10: Resting in Hinckley
- August 11: Hinckley to Aurora
- August 12: Aurora to Sacred Heart Priory, Lisle
- August 13: Lisle to Bethlehem Center, La Grange Park
- August 14: La Grange to North Park Village Nature Center, Chicago
- August 15–17: Resting in Chicago

=== Indiana ===
- August 18: Chicago to Wolf Lake Park, Hammond
- August 19: Hammond to Marquette Park, Gary
- August 20: Gary to Indiana Dunes State Park near Chesterton
- August 21: Chesterton to LaPorte County Fairgrounds, LaPorte
- August 22: LaPorte to Bourissa Hills Park, New Carlisle
- August 23: New Carlisle to University of Notre Dame, South Bend
- August 24: Resting in South Bend
- August 25: South Bend to McNaughton Park in Elkhart
- August 26: Elkhart to Eby's Pines near Bristol
- August 27: Bristol to Shipshewana
- August 28: Shipshewana to LaGrange
- August 29: LaGrange to Crooked Lake Camp, Angola

=== Ohio ===
- August 30: Angola to Columbia
- August 31: Columbia to private land near Montpelier
- September 1: Resting in Montpelier
- September 2: Montpelier to private land near Wauseon
- September 3: Wauseon to Swanton
- September 4: Swanton to Lucas County Fairgrounds, Maumee
- September 5: Resting in Maumee
- September 6: Maumee to Oregon
- September 7: Oregon to Bergman Orchards, Danbury Township
- September 8: Resting in Danbury Township
- September 9: Danbury Township to Osborn MetroPark, Huron
- September 10: Huron to Vermilion Middle School, Vermilion
- September 11: Vermilion to St. Joseph School, Avon Lake
- September 12: Avon Lake to Edgewater Park, Cleveland
- September 13–14: Resting in Cleveland
- September 15: Cleveland to North Randall
- September 16: North Randall to Geauga Lake, Aurora
- September 17: Aurora to James A. Garfield High School, Garrettsville
- September 18: Garrettsville to Warren Church of Christ, Warren
- September 19: Warren to Wick Park, Youngstown
- September 20: Resting in Youngstown
- September 21: Youngstown to Petersburg

=== Pennsylvania ===
- September 22: Petersburg to Brady's Run Park, Beaver Falls
- September 23: Beaver Falls to North Hills Unitarian Church, Franklin Park
- September 24: Franklin Park to North Park near McCandless
- September 25: North Park to Schenley Park, Pittsburgh
- September 26: Resting in Pittsburgh
- September 27: Pittsburgh to Renzie Park, McKeesport
- September 28: McKeesport to Greensburg
- September 29: Greensburg to Ligonier Playground, Ligonier
- September 30: Ligonier to Jennerstown
- October 1: Jennerstown to Schellsburg
- October 2: Schellsburg to Bedford Fairgrounds, Bedford
- October 3: Resting in Bedford
- October 4: Bedford to Breezewood
- October 5: Breezewood to Fulton County Fairgrounds, McConnellsburg
- October 6: McConnellsburg to St. Thomas Township
- October 7: St. Thomas to Shippensburg
- October 8: Shippensburg to Carlisle Fairgrounds, Carlisle
- October 9: Carlisle to Harrisburg
- October 10: Resting in Harrisburg
- October 11: Harrisburg to Campbelltown
- October 12: Campbelltown to Lebanon Area Fairgrounds, North Cornwall Township
- October 13: Lebanon to Robesonia
- October 14: Robesonia to Reading
- October 15: Reading to Kutztown Fairgrounds, Kutztown
- October 16: Kutztown to Dorney Park & Wildwater Kingdom, South Whitehall Township
- October 17: Resting at Dorney Park

=== New Jersey ===
- October 18: Dorney Park to Delaware River Park, Phillipsburg
- October 19: Phillipsburg to private land near Port Murray
- October 20: Anderson to Crescent Field, Dover
- October 21: Dover to Caldwell College, Caldwell
- October 22: Caldwell to Overpeck County Park, Leonia

=== New York ===
- October 23: Leonia to Randalls Island, New York City
- October 24–25: Resting on Randalls Island
- October 26: Randalls Island to Staten Island, New York City
- October 27: Resting on Staten Island

=== New Jersey ===
- October 28: Staten Island to Rahway
- October 29: Rahway to Livingston College, Rutgers University, Piscataway Township
- October 30: Piscataway to Princeton University, Princeton

=== Pennsylvania ===
- October 31: Princeton to Core Creek Park, Middletown Township
- November 1: Core Creek Park to Pennypack Park, Philadelphia
- November 2: Pennypack Park to Fairmount Park, Philadelphia
- November 3: Resting at Fairmount Park
- November 4: Philadelphia to Swarthmore

=== Delaware ===
- November 5: Swarthmore to New Castle Farmer's Market, New Castle

=== Maryland ===
- November 6: New Castle to Fair Hill Fairgrounds, Fair Hill
- November 7: Fair Hill to Rising Sun
- November 8: Rising Sun to Hickory Elementary School, Hickory
- November 9: Hickory to Perry Hall
- November 10: Perry Hall to Memorial Stadium parking lot, Baltimore
- November 11: Resting in Baltimore
- November 12: Baltimore to Rockburn Branch Park, Elkridge
- November 13: Elkridge to Ammendale Normal Institute, Beltsville

=== Washington, D.C. ===
- November 14: Beltsville to St. Paul's College, Washington
- November 15: St. Paul's College to the Lincoln Memorial

== Outcomes ==
Writer Connie Fledderjohann, who had participated in the march, retraced its route and interviewed supporters and local residents throughout 1987 to assess the impact it had on the communities through which it passed. Fledderjohann concluded that many people who witnessed the march had been influenced by what they saw, and that the organization of the march had helped to inspire further protests against nuclear weapons. Contrary to expectations, marchers generally saw that their journey had a greater effect on people in small towns, where they were more conspicuous, compared to more populous cities where they were often ignored.

The model of the Great Peace March was followed by organizers of other protest events. Among the first was a trek across Florida in December 1986 and January 1987, protesting the first launch tests of the Trident II nuclear missile at Cape Canaveral. During the summer of 1987, a group of 200 Soviets and 200 Americans, including some who had helped to organize the Great Peace March, took part in the American-Soviet Peace Walk from Leningrad (now St. Petersburg) and Moscow in the Soviet Union. This walk was largely inspired by the Great Peace March, which had received substantial coverage in the Soviet press. Seeds of Peace, a group of organizers from the Great Peace March using equipment from the march, supported the Florida march and subsequently organized the New England Walk for Nuclear Disarmament in 1987, covering over 200 miles from Pease Air Force Base in Portsmouth, New Hampshire, to the Electric Boat nuclear submarine plant in Groton, Connecticut.

The march also had similarities to several other cross-continental protests both before and after, although the Great Peace March was unusual in its scale and scope, with hundreds of participants at all points along the way. In particular, the Great Peace March was preceded by Walk of the People – A Pilgrimage for Life, which started in Southern California on March 1, 1984, reached Washington, D.C. in November of that year on its way to New York City, then was flown across the Atlantic and crossed Western Europe before being denied entry to East Germany. Journalist Kevin James Shay, who later wrote about his experience in the Walk of the People, walked with the Great Peace March for its first week in California.

More recently, Ed Fallon was inspired by his experience with the Great Peace March to organize the Great March for Climate Action, which was held in 2014.

While the march's central objective of total worldwide nuclear disarmament has not been achieved, some of its smaller protest targets have disappeared or have been significantly reduced in the decades since. The Rocky Flats Plant was shut down due to safety concerns in 1989 and formally decommissioned in 1992. President Reagan had rejected calls for a moratorium on nuclear testing since taking office in 1981, but his administration restarted negotiations to do so in 1987. The Great Peace March was followed shortly after by the collapse of the Soviet Union and the end of the Cold War, removing the impetus for the nuclear arms race. The United States ultimately ended all of its nuclear weapons testing in 1992, as it entered into negotiations for the international Comprehensive Nuclear-Test-Ban Treaty. While the treaty has not entered into force, no nation other than North Korea has tested a nuclear weapon since 1998. Since 1986, the United States' nuclear stockpile has been reduced from 22,995 to 3,708, while total global stockpiles peaked in 1986 at 70,300 and have since been reduced to 13,890.

The Great Peace March has been the subject of several books written by marchers and supporters (see the "Resources" section below), as well as a documentary film, Just One Step, directed by Cathy Zheutlin.

== Resources ==
=== Film ===
- Just One Step was a documentary film of the Great Peace March by Cathy Zheutlin, edited by James Knight

=== Books ===
- The Great Peace March: An American Odyssey (Peacewatch Edition) by Franklin Folsom, Connie Fledderjohann, and Gerda Lawrence
- Feet Across America by New Zealand marcher Anne Macfarlane
- Walking For Our Lives by marcher Donna Rankin Love
- Spirit Walk: The Great Peace March of 1986 by Martin Vincent Hippie, 2012.
- Peace Like a River: A Personal Journey Across America by Sue Guist
- Lost Journals from the Great Peace March by Gene Gordon
- A Strange Place Called Home: My Walk Across America on the Great Peace March by Laura Monagan
- The Great Peace March, song by Holly Near adapted into children's book, with paintings by Lisa Desimini
- Central Body: The Art of Guy Colwell, including work from the years 1964 to 1991. Includes a section of his sketches of the G.P.M.
- "Pit Stop For The Angels" by Bill Patterson. This book contains sketches of the marchers and the places they stayed throughout the march.
- Walking to Japan—a Memoir by Derek Youngs & Carolyn Affleck Youngs, 2016. This book contains several chapters about the Great Peace March.
- The Prince of Peace City, a novel based on the Great Peace March by marcher Lee W. Anderson, 2016.

=== Research ===
- Peace March: Process = Success, Conflict Resolution Consortium, Working Paper 90-3, May 1990. By Lynne Ihlstrom, Department of Sociology, University of Colorado at Boulder.
- Dain TePoel, "Endurance Activism: Transcontinental Walking, the Great Peace March and the Politics of Movement Culture." Ph.D. dissertation, University of Iowa, 2018.
- Dain TePoel, "Meaning by Doing: The Making of Endurance Activism on the 1986 Great Peace March for Global Nuclear Disarmament." Sports History Review 51, no. 2 (2020): 164-185.
- Kyle Harvey, American Anti-nuclear Activism, 1975-1990: The Challenge of Peace. Palgrave Macmillan, 2014. Chapter 7.

=== Music ===
- Wild Wimmin For Peace CD
- Lyrics for song from Wild Wimmin CD-Bridgett Evans by Judy Small
- "No More Silence" YouTube video. Song written by marcher Darryl Purpose. This updated version sung by Clan Dyken with new rap added.
- No More Silence lyrics.
- Beautiful Planet by Michael Krieger. Scroll down to "Look Inside" CD.

=== Articles written by marchers ===
- "A Laboratory in Democracy: Revisiting the Great Peace March" by Steve Brigham
- "How to Make a Decision Without Making a Decision" (written for Communities magazine, Winter 2000) by Tom Atlee
- "The Tao of Democracy" by Tom Atlee

=== Audio interviews ===
- "The Wisdom of the Whole", audio of Tom Atlee
- "Audio interview with New Zealand marcher Maynie Thompson"

== See also ==
- Walk for Peace
