= Sherzan =

Sherzan is a surname. Notable people with the surname include:

- Gary Sherzan (born 1944), American politician in the state of Iowa
- Richard Sherzan (born 1946), American politician in the state of Iowa, brother of above
