= Ed Fallon =

American politician

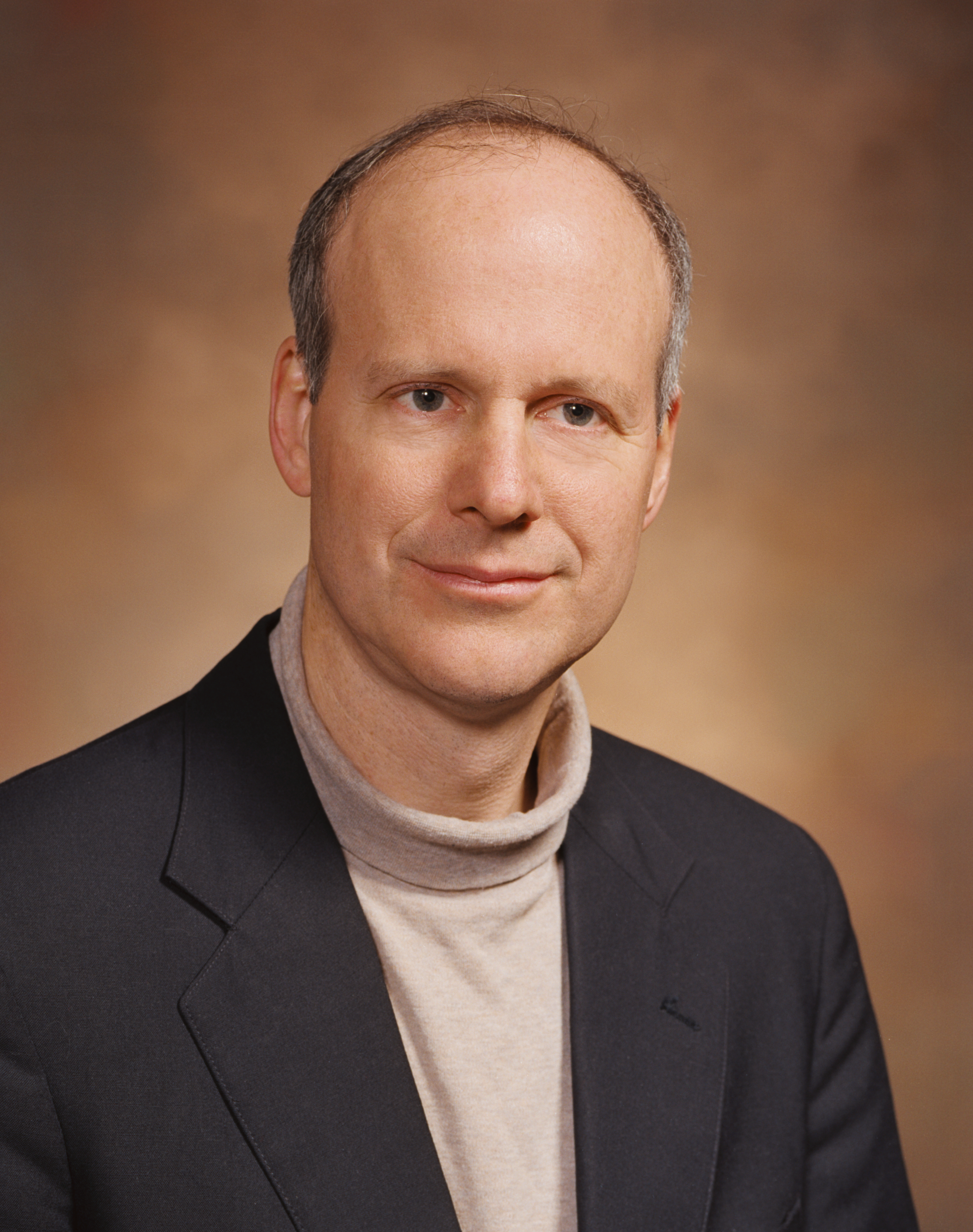
- Fallon in 2005

Member of the Iowa House of Representatives from the 66th district
- In office 1993–2006
- Preceded by: Gary Sherzan
- Succeeded by: Ako Abdul-Samad

Personal details
- Born: March 1, 1958 (age 68) Santa Monica, California, U.S.
- Party: Democratic
- Children: 2
- Education: Drake University

Ed S. Fallon (born 1958) is an American activist, former politician, talk show host, author and urban farmer from the U.S. state of Iowa. He was previously a Democratic candidate for Governor of Iowa and the U.S. Congress, and served as a member of the Iowa General Assembly from 1993 to 2006.

== Early life ==
The son of a member of the U.S. military, Fallon was born in Santa Monica, California in 1958, but spent the majority of his formative years living in Saugus, Massachusetts. After two years at Marlboro College in Vermont, he spent several years traveling around Europe, Canada, and the Middle East. At one point, having exhausted his financial resources, he was homeless for a time before returning to the United States. During his travels, he acquired some fluency in Spanish and French.

Upon returning to the U.S., he moved to Iowa, where he attended Drake University between 1985 and 1987, earning a bachelor's degree in religious studies. Fallon also worked as a field canvasser for Iowa Citizen Action Network during this period. After graduating from Drake, he became a community organizer in the inner city of Des Moines, the result of his opposition to the then-dominant policies of President Ronald Reagan and other conservative Republicans. After organizing the Iowa portion of the Great Peace March for Global Nuclear Disarmament in 1986, Fallon founded the Des Moines Campaign for Nuclear Disarmament, which ultimately became Clarion Alliance, a non-profit focusing on peace and conflict resolution issues.

== Career ==
=== State legislature ===
In 1992, he decided to enter electoral politics, challenging Democratic State Representative Gary Sherzan, a ten-year incumbent, for re-nomination. Although Sherzan outspent him by almost a two-to-one margin, Fallon won the primary with 63% of the vote and went on to an easy victory in the general election.

During the 2000 presidential election, he made headlines across the state when he endorsed the candidacy of Green Party nominee Ralph Nader over that of Democrat Al Gore because of Gore's choice of Joe Lieberman as a running mate. Fallon admitted in 2001 that, while people's frustration with the Democratic Party was legitimate, his decision to back Nader was a mistake.

The leaders of the Iowa Democratic Party, angered at Fallon's actions, stripped him of his place as ranking member of the House Local Government Committee. He was voted off the Polk County Democratic Central Committee and, when the state was redistricted in 2001, 70% of his former constituents were moved to another district (which was done through a non-partisan process). Facing a three-way primary in what was for all intents and purposes a new district, Fallon was not expected to survive. Instead, he won 68% of the vote in the primary and won re-election to a sixth term.

=== 2006 gubernatorial race ===
In October 2002, after progressive Minnesota Senator Paul Wellstone died in a plane crash, Fallon decided that he wanted to emulate Wellstone's impact on his state's politics by running for Governor. After spending almost two and a half years testing the waters and preparing for his run, he announced his candidacy on April 9, 2005, at a rally at the Iowa State Capitol, becoming the first candidate to officially declare.

During the course of the race, in which he faced Secretary of State Chet Culver and former state economic development director and Congressman Mike Blouin, Fallon positioned himself as a candidate focused on populist concerns. The main focal point of his campaign was a pledge to enact voluntary public financing of elections, a pledge that he reinforced with his refusal to accept donations from political action committees and lobbyists and his self-imposed limitation of $2400 in contributions per person. He was also in favor of creating a locally owned renewable fuels industry, universal health care, reforming the Departments of Human Services and Corrections, ending government handouts to big business, and increased funding for public education. He opposed urban sprawl, legalized gambling, factory farms, and the Iowa Values Fund, a multimillion-dollar corporate incentive package that he dubbed "corporate welfare."

In January and March 2006, more delegates pledged to him were selected to attend the state party convention than those of any other candidate. If no candidate had won 35% of the vote in the primary, convention delegates would have awarded the nomination. In late May, he received the endorsement of the Iowa Sierra Club and the Iowa City Press-Citizen, becoming the first candidate to receive support from a major newspaper.

In the primary on June 6, 2006, the winner was Chet Culver with 57,976 votes (39.09%) and Fallon ran third out of a field of four, receiving 38,160 votes (25.73%). Although this result was not the win that Fallon and his supporters had hoped for, it was considerably in excess of the 5 to 10% that pundits had speculated he might receive at the beginning of the race.

=== Hiatus from politics ===
On November 10, 2006, three days after the midterm elections, during which candidates that Fallon had campaigned for were elected Governor, Secretary of State, and to the state legislature and the United States Congress, he announced in an e-mail to supporters that he would take a hiatus from electoral politics, during which he would form a new political activist organization, dedicated to social justice, clean elections, and encouraging local and state action to address global warming.

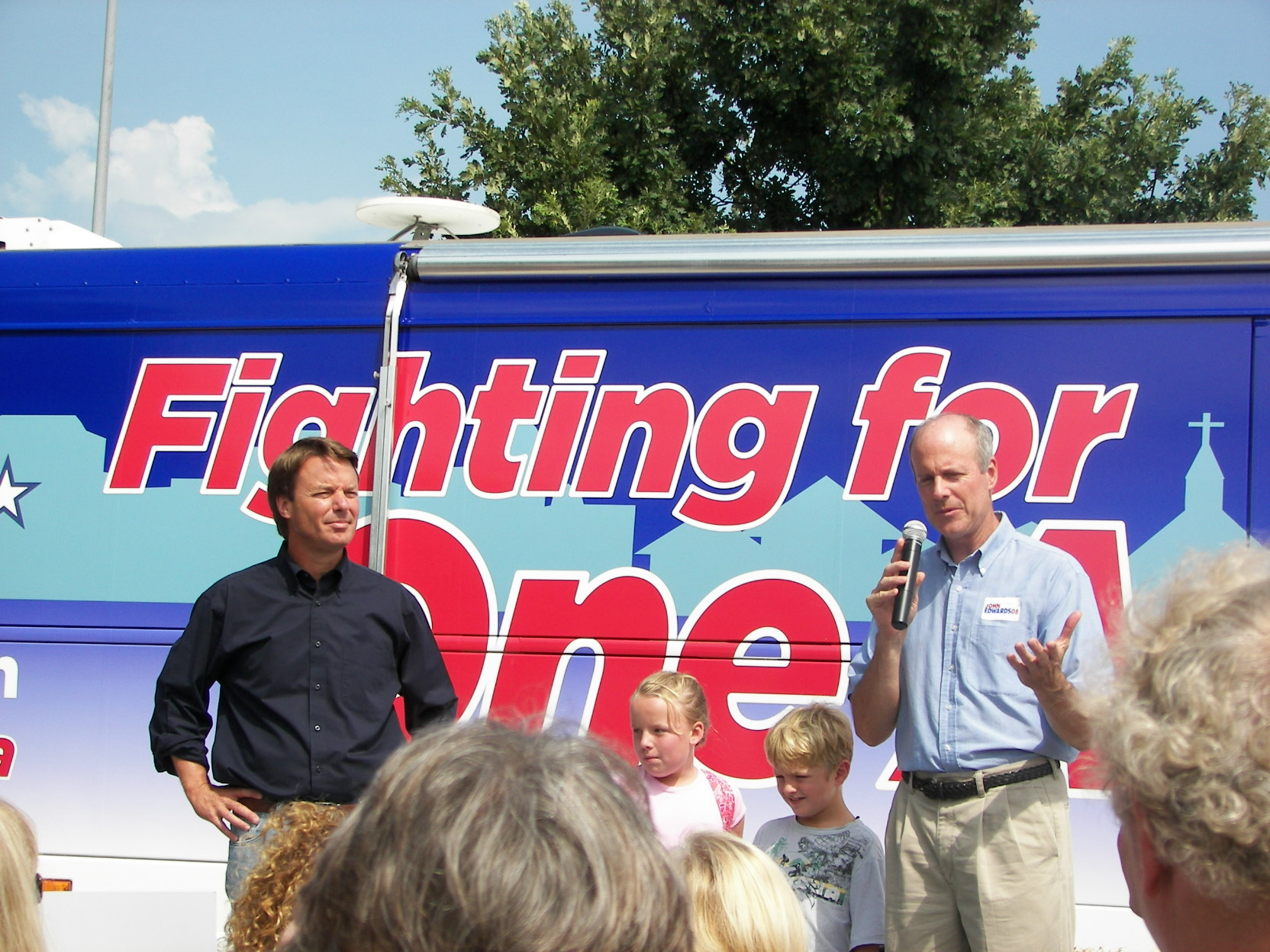
Fallon campaigning for John Edwards, joining Edwards and Edwards' youngest children at an August 2007 rally for Edwards' 2008 presidential campaign

On December 28, 2006, Fallon appeared in Des Moines at the first official presidential campaign event of former North Carolina Senator John Edwards, taking tickets and passing out Edwards campaign literature. Edwards, who was the Democratic nominee for Vice President in 2004, has taken positions similar to Fallon's on campaign finance reform and universal health care, and has called for an end to poverty and an immediate withdrawal from the Iraq War.

On January 11, 2007, Fallon announced in an e-mail to supporters that he had co-founded a private business called "Independence Movement for Iowa," or I'M for Iowa. According to Fallon, the organization will seek "independence" for Iowa from "special interest campaign contributions"; "poverty, injustice and discrimination"; "fossil fuels and foreign oil"; "government subsidies for big business"; and "government officials who operate without the public's interest in mind, often behind closed doors, and with a lack of integrity and accountability.". Questions were raised about I'M for Iowa in March 2007 about whether the organization was following campaign finance laws and behaving in an ethical manner."

=== 2008 Congressional run ===
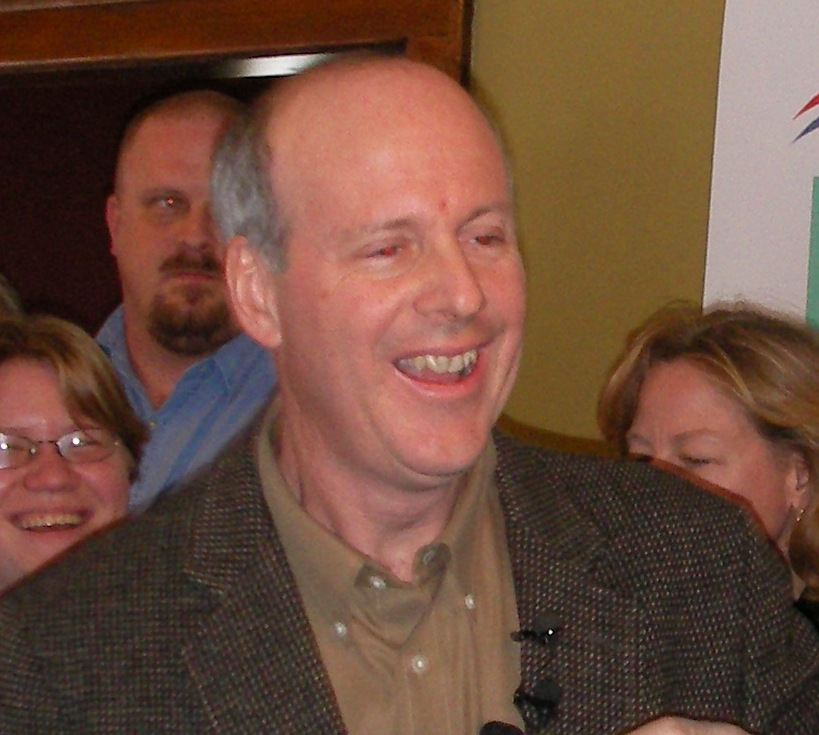
Fallon campaigning in 2008

On January 8, 2008, Fallon formally filed paperwork with the Federal Election Commission to run for Congress against fellow Democrat Leonard Boswell. He formally announced his candidacy in a press conference in Des Moines on January 16, 2008.

Media reports noted that Fallon carried the 3rd District in the 2006 gubernatorial primary, and examination of the caucus results shows that John Edwards, whom Fallon endorsed, did much better in the district than did Senator Hillary Clinton, whom Boswell endorsed. Edwards carried six counties in the district, while Clinton carried none. Fallon was defeated by Boswell in the Democratic primary on June 3, 2008, by a 61 to 39 percent margin.

== Activism ==
=== Occupy movement ===
Fallon was arrested with a number of others on October 8, 2011, on the Iowa Capitol grounds when police broke up the Occupy Des Moines encampment, part of the Occupy Movement. Fallon was found not guilty of trespassing by a jury on March 9, 2012.

=== Climate advocacy ===
On March 1, 2013, Fallon announced the start of a campaign aimed at inspiring society to take action on climate change. Fallon assembled a team and launched the non-profit, Great March for Climate Action. His plan to inspire hundreds of individuals to march across the nation, from Los Angeles, CA to Washington, DC, helped motivate both the general public and elected officials to address climate change.

On March 2, 2015, Fallon began a 400-mile hike along the then-proposed Dakota Access pipeline in Keokuk, to protest and rally support for farmers, landowners, and Indigenous people affected by the plan. On May 18, 2015, Capitol Police were called for a disturbance in the Governor's Office. Fallon was found refusing to leave as he protested the Dakota Access pipeline. He was escorted off the premises and charged with criminal trespassing. He posted bond that evening.

From late 2015 to early 2016, Fallon worked with The Climate Mobilization to approach presidential candidates campaigning for the Iowa caucuses urging a more realistic and ambitious approach to the climate crisis, an economic mobilization on the scale of the American effort during World War II for 100% clean energy and net zero greenhouse gas emissions by 2025. In January 2016, Fallon hosted a "Climate Emergency Caucus" in Des Moines before the Iowa caucuses, which simulated the state's 2016 Democratic presidential primary caucus. Bernie Sanders won the vote with 67% of attendees. Fallon endorsed Sanders for president, and spoke publicly in his favor in advance of the Iowa caucuses.

Since its formation in 2016, Fallon has served as the director of Bold Iowa. Bold Iowa's mission is to build rural-urban coalitions to address climate change and prevent the abuse of eminent domain to build pipelines.

Fallon wrote his first book, Marcher, Walker, Pilgrim, published in 2018.

=== Urban farming ===
Currently, in addition to hosting The Fallon Forum talk show, and directing Bold Iowa and Climate March, Ed Fallon and his wife manage Birds & Bees Urban Farm, a Des Moines educational non-profit urban farm.
