= Iowa Highway 192 =

Former state highway in Iowa, United States

Iowa Highway 192
- Iowa 192 highlighted in red

Route information
- Maintained by Iowa State Highway Commission
- Length: 5.090 mi (8.192 km)
- Existed: 1980–2017

Major junctions
- South end: I-29 / I-80 in Council Bluffs
- US 6 in Council Bluffs
- North end: I-29 in Council Bluffs

Location
- Country: United States
- State: Iowa
- Counties: Pottawattamie

Highway system
- Iowa Primary Highway System; Interstate; US; State; Secondary; Scenic
← Iowa 191	→ Iowa 196

Iowa Highway 192 (Iowa 192) was a north–south highway within the city limits of Council Bluffs, Iowa. It had a length of 5 miles (8.0 km). It began and an interchange with Interstate 29 (I-29) and I-80 in the southern part of the city. It briefly overlapped U.S. Highway 6 (US 6) near downtown. It ended at another interchange with I-29 just south of the northern city limits. It was designated in 1980 and turned over to the city of Council Bluffs in stages; the northern half in 2016 and the southern half in 2017.

Iowa 192 existed from the 1930s to the 1970s in a route similar to this route. That route served as an access road from downtown Council Bluffs to Lake Manawa State Park.

== Route description ==
Iowa 192 began at an interchange with I-29 / I-80 in southern Council Bluffs. It headed north along the four-lane South Expressway parallel to a line of the BNSF Railway. A grain elevator towered over the road and railway just north of the I-29 / I-80 interchange. Between 23rd and 19th avenues, the highway eased one block to the west.

North of the stoplight at 19th Avenue, it became an elevated highway in order to avoid level crossings with the multiple railroad tracks that passed beneath. Immediately after crossing 9th Street, the elevated highway returned to the surface and the two directions of traffic split into a one-way couplet – S. 6th Street northbound and S. 7th Street southbound. The division of the two directions also marked the end of the South Expressway. As Iowa 192 approached the west side downtown Council Bluffs, it passed the historic Pottawattamie County Jail, a three-story rotary jail used from 1885 to 1969.

At W. Kanesville Boulevard, which carried US 6, the one-way couplet ended and Iowa 192 turned west onto Kanesville. Shortly thereafter, the street turned into Broadway. US 6 and Iowa 192 headed west together along W. Broadway on a viaduct over a line of the Union Pacific Railroad. One block after the viaduct returned to street level, Iowa 192 left US 6. It traveled north through a residential area along N. 16th Street. Shortly after crossing a Canadian National Railway line, the road became a divided highway. Iowa 192 ended as it merged into I-29 traffic close to the northern city limits of Council Bluffs. There was no direct access to southbound I-29 from northbound Iowa 192. Likewise, northbound I-29 traffic could not directly access southbound Iowa 192.

== History ==
Iowa 192 was designated first in 1931 as an access road to Lake Manawa State Park, which is located in southern Council Bluffs. It began at Lake Manawa and headed north along Main Street. At 25th Avenue, it turned west two blocks to S. 7th Street. It followed S. 7th Street until 16th Avenue, where turned east back to Main Street. It followed Main until it ended at 9th Avenue, which carried US 34. Within a few years, US 34 was joined by US 275. US 34 was rerouted out of Council Bluffs in 1935. US 275 was rerouted along South Omaha Bridge Road and replaced by Iowa 375 in 1941. Iowa 192 was extended north to Broadway in 1971 when Iowa 375 was turned over to the city. Iowa 192 itself was turned over to the city in 1975.

Iowa 192 reappeared in 1980 during a series of jurisdictional transfers conducted by the Iowa Department of Transportation (Iowa DOT). It was redesignated along its old routing, but from I-29 / I-80 instead of from Lake Manawa. The route has not undergone any changes since its redesignation. As part of a $26 million project to upgrade West Broadway, Iowa 192 north of downtown was turned over to the City of Council Bluffs on May 1, 2016. The transfer of jurisdiction for the remainder of the route was approved by the Iowa Transportation Commission on December 12, 2017.

== Major intersections ==
The entire route was in Council Bluffs, Pottawattamie County.

mi	km	Destinations	Notes
0.000	0.000	I-29 / I-80 – Omaha, Des Moines, Kansas City	Exit 3 on I-80; road continues as South Expressway
2.426	3.904	US 6 east (Kanesville Boulevard)	Southern end of US 6 overlap
3.249	5.229	US 6 west (Broadway)	Northern end of US 6 overlap
5.090	8.192	I-29 north – Sioux City	No access to I-29 southbound; exit 56 on I-29
1.000 mi = 1.609 km; 1.000 km = 0.621 mi: Concurrency terminus; Incomplete access
