= Great March for Climate Action =

US Climate Change organization

- Formation: 2013
- Type: NGO
- Legal status: 501(c)(3)
- Purpose: Inspire the general public and elected officials to take climate action
- Headquarters: Des Moines, Iowa, United States
- Founder: Ed Fallon
- Staff: 6
- Volunteers: over 200
- Website: www.climatemarch.org

The Great March for Climate Action (also known as the Climate March) was launched on March 1, 2013, by former Iowa lawmaker Ed Fallon, inspired by a meeting with Bill McKibben. "Since probably 2007, I've identified the climate crisis as the most serious challenge facing our planet, and I've been pondering ways in which I could most effectively help address it."

The non-profit organization planned to mobilize one thousand people to march across the continental United States in order to raise awareness and action on anthropogenic climate change. The march began March 1, 2014, in Wilmington neighborhood in South Los Angeles, California, and ended on November 1, 2014, when marchers arrived in Washington, D.C. Along the route, participants engaged with the general public and elected officials in order to inspire society to address climate change. In the end, a group of 34 people traveled the entire route from Los Angeles, California, to Washington D.C., and five people walked every step from LA to DC.

In a Des Moines Register interview, Fallon said, "We think it's very important. We think this is a tool that will help mobilize people to understand the problem and to do more about it…this needs to become the defining issue of this century." Fallon was inspired in part by another cross-country march, the 1986 Great Peace March for Global Nuclear Disarmament, for which he coordinated the Iowa logistics. Although this was a national campaign, it was intended to have an international audience and to include participants from multiple nations.

The headquarters of the non-profit are located in Des Moines, Iowa. As of October 2013, they had six staff, had raised $120,000, and earned endorsements from 350.org, James Hansen, U.S. Senator Tom Harkin, and Congressman Bruce Braley.

== March route ==
The marchers departed from Wilmington, California on March 1, 2014, traveling through Nebraska (focus on the Keystone Pipeline) and ended in Washington, D.C. in November, 2014. The route passed through California, Arizona, New Mexico, Colorado, Nebraska, Iowa, Illinois, Indiana, Ohio, Pennsylvania, Maryland, Washington, D.C. and the following cities (unverified):

- Los Angeles, CA
- San Bernardino, CA
- Parker, AZ
- Wickenburg, AZ
- Phoenix, AZ
- Payson, AZ
- Albuquerque, NM
- Santa Fe, NM
- Taos, NM
- Colorado Springs, CO
- Denver, CO
- Kearney, NE
- Lincoln, NE
- Omaha, NE
- Des Moines, IA
- Grinnell, IA
- Iowa City, IA
- Davenport, IA
- Chicago, IL
- Toledo, OH
- Cleveland, OH
- Youngstown, OH
- Pittsburgh, PA
- Hagerstown, MD
- Washington, D.C.

== Reasons for marching ==
Reverend Bob Cook planned to take part in the march. "The Des Moines pastor’s life work has been for the poor, but he doesn’t view the Great March for Climate Action as a departure. The poor are affected most by climate change, as they are from most troubling world events, Cook said."

Ben Bushwick, a student at Ohio University, marched most of the way. “I’m marching because quite frankly I don’t see any other choice,” Bushwick said. “Atmospheric disruption is a real threat that people do not take seriously and will make mitigation and adaptation efforts a lot more difficult.”

Faith Meckley, a student at Ithaca College, says, “I was interested, but only for a three-week walk from Pittsburgh to Washington. ... After thinking about it and talking to my academic advisor at Ithaca, I decided to take the spring semester off and do the walk from Taos, N.M., to Washington. I am committed to this issue. I want to do more than my environmental blog and sign petitions. I have a respect for the planet.” In line with her commitment, she left the march early to protest storage of liquefied petroleum gas and natural gas in her hometown region of Seneca Lake, New York.

== Logistics ==
An average day’s walk was expected to be 14–15 miles. Campsites for tents were prearranged. Organizers had hoped to haul all of the gear and supplies via bicycles to minimize energy consumption and maximize sustainability, but after some intensive research this proved infeasible, so trucks running on biodiesel or vegetable oil fuel were used. Research into solar cookers, composting toilets, determined how far the marchers were able to use sustainable methods to handle food and energy needs, and human waste. Participants and volunteers shared daily chores including but not limited to setting up camp, food preparation and clean-up. Interactive workshops focused on climate change, the anthropogenic effect on the environment, and active solutions.

== Other activist marches in political and social change ==
Throughout history, marches have been associated with political and social change. Examples include but are not limited to: the Woman Suffrage Parade of 1913, Gandhi's Salt March to defy Britain's imperial power, Martin Luther King Jr's Selma to Montgomery marches for voting rights and the Great Peace March for Global Nuclear Disarmament. Peace walks have been particularly popular in the peace movement.

== See also ==
- People's Climate March (2014)
- People's Climate March (2017)
- Climate change
- Environmental movement
- Environmental movement in the United States
- Individual and political action on climate change
- Business action on climate change
