= 2014 People's Climate March =

Climate change protest in New York City, U.S.

People's Climate March
- Part of the climate movement
- Date: September 21, 2014
- Location: New York City with other events globally on the same day
- Goals: Action to reduce climate change
- Methods: Demonstration

Number
Participating people	+300,000 worldwide

The People's Climate March (PCM) was a large-scale activist event orchestrated by the People's Climate Movement to advocate global action against climate change, which took place on Sunday, September 21, 2014, in New York City, along with a series of companion actions worldwide, many of which also took the name People's Climate March. With an estimated 311,000 participants, the New York event was the largest climate change march in history. Described as "an invitation to change everything", the march was called in May 2014 by the global advocacy human rights group Avaaz and 350.org, the environmental organization founded by writer/activist Bill McKibben, and it was endorsed by "over 1,500 organizations, including many international and national unions, churches, schools and community and environmental justice organizations." It was conceived as a response to (but not a protest against) the scheduled U.N. Climate Summit of world leaders to take place in New York City two days later, on September 23.

Although based in New York, the event was global in scope and implication, with "companion demonstrations" worldwide. Organizers intended the march to be "the largest single event on climate that has been organized to date... one so large and diverse that it cannot be ignored." The entire PCM project consisted of "numerous events, actions, symposia, presentations, and more organized over the course of the days leading up to the Summit, and in the days following," of which the march was intended to be "the anchor event". Worldwide, nearly 600,000 people were estimated to have marched on September 21, including those in New York.

== Public invitation to the march ==
On May 21, McKibben published an article on the website of Rolling Stone magazine (later appearing in the magazine's print issue of June 5), entitled "A Call to Arms," which invited readers to a major climate march in New York City for the weekend of September 20–21. (Note: Both dates were mentioned in the McKibben article because it was not certain at the time which one would be the date on which the march would actually take place. After later negotiations with New York City authorities, the event planners chose Sunday the 21st as the definitive date.) In the article, McKibben calls climate change "the biggest crisis our civilization has ever faced", and predicts that the march will be "the largest demonstration yet of human resolve in the face of climate change".

After criticizing world leaders, including President Obama, for not moving fast enough or going far enough to combat climate change, McKibben cites increasing evidence of environmental deterioration, including the melting of Arctic and Antarctic ice, the acidification of the oceans, and violent weather and quotes one climate scientist as exclaiming "We're all sitting ducks." He blames this state of affairs primarily on the fossil-fuel industry, which "by virtue of being perhaps the richest enterprise in human history, has been able to delay effective action, almost to the point where it's too late." Although he claims that local, small-scale activism is crucial, the global climate justice movement sometimes "needs to come together and show the world how big it's gotten," and to allow for "opening up space for change". Writes McKibben: "A loud movement – one that gives our 'leaders' permission to actually lead, and then scares them into doing so – is the only hope of upending" the "prophecy" that it's already too late to reverse the problem.

== Staging area and route ==
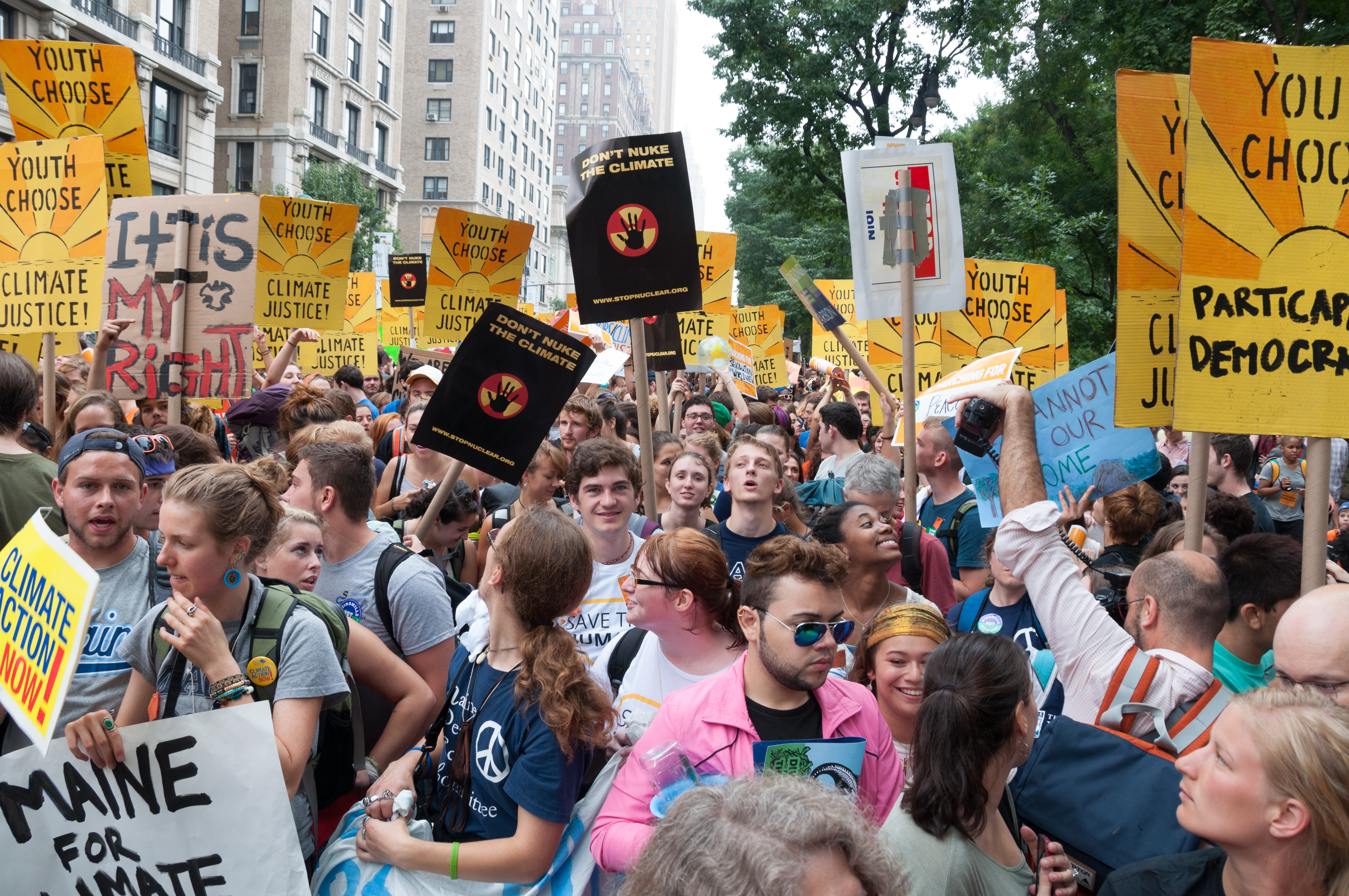
A view of one section of the march waiting to start, north of Columbus Circle on Broadway, NYC

The staging area in which marchers for the New York City event were to assemble on the morning of September 21, as agreed upon by the march organizers and local authorities, was located in a blocked-off area of Central Park West between 59th and 86th Streets, north of Manhattan's Columbus Circle, which is the official starting point of the march. The area was divided into six sections, and participating groups were to gather in the particular section appropriate to the mission and purpose of each group. These were:

- "Frontline" groups ("Frontlines of Crisis, Forefront of Change"), located between 59th and 65th Streets – This area includes those people who are first and most impacted by climate change, including indigenous peoples, environmental justice organizations and other communities;
- Generational groups ("We Can Build the Future"), located between 65th and 72nd Streets – This area includes labor organizations, families – parents and their children, students, elders, etc.;
- Environmental groups ("We Have Solutions"), located between 72nd and 77th Streets – This area includes renewable energy, food and water justice and general environmental organizations;
- Protest groups ("We Know Who Is Responsible"), located between 77th and 81st Streets – This area includes anti-corporate and peace and justice groups as well as similar organizations;
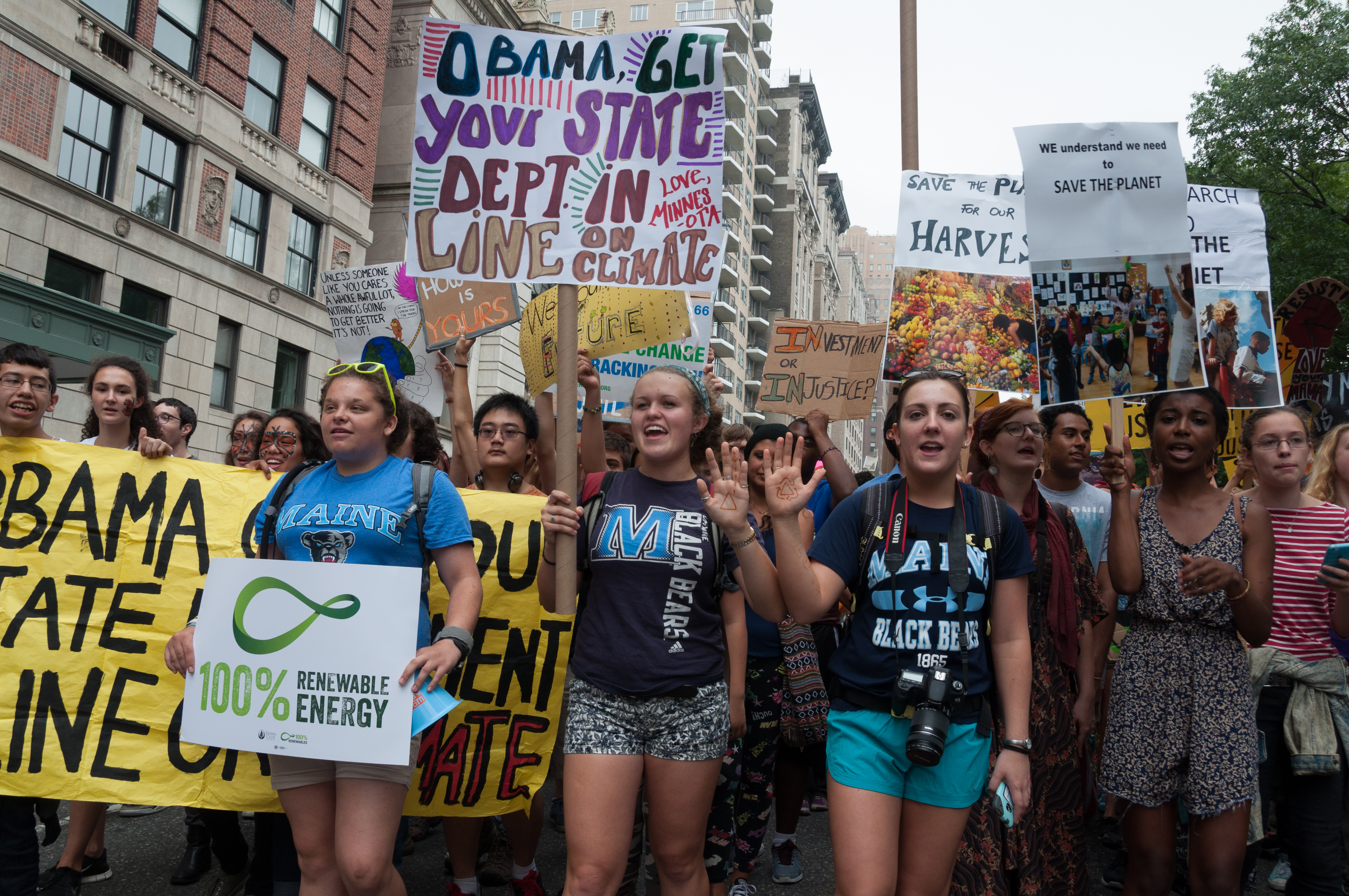
- Participating students march down Central Park West.
  Science ("The Debate Is Over"), located between 81st and 82nd Streets – This area includes scientists, interfaith groups and related organizations;
- Interfaith group, (Lutheran, Hindu), located on 58th Street between 8th and 9th Avenues.
- Miscellaneous groups ("To Change Everything, We Need Everyone"), located between 82nd and 86th Street – This area includes LGBTQ groups and various geographic entities, including New York City boroughs and communities, other U.S. city and state groups and groups from non-U.S. countries.

The drop-off point for charter buses of marchers arriving from other places in the U.S. was on 86th Street between Broadway and Central Park West. The staging area is most easily accessible by subway via the 1 line (66th, 72nd and 79th Street stops) and the C line (72nd, 81st and 86th Street stops).

There were only five permitted entry points to the staging area; all other streets were blocked off. The five permitted entry points were 65th, 72nd, 77th, 81st and 86th Streets. It was anticipated by some organizers that parts or all of the staging area might be closed off by the police well before the march is due to begin at 11:30 am, which means that those who arrive late in the morning might be placed at the rear of the march. In addition, those who leave the area before the march begins might not be permitted by the police to return. Therefore, some organizers advised marchers to arrive with sufficient food, water and sunscreen, as, after a certain point, they might not be able to leave the area.

The march began at 11:30 am at Manhattan's Columbus Circle. The march itinerary included 59th Street (moving east), 6th Avenue (moving south), 42nd Street (moving west) and 11th Avenue (moving south), ending at 34th Street and 11th Avenue, near the Jacob K. Javits Convention Center.

== Peripheral events ==
A number of peripheral events were planned for before, during or after the weekend of the march. They included the following:

=== Great March for Climate Action ===
The Great March for Climate Action consists of a cross-country march from Los Angeles, California, to Washington, D.C., which began on March 1, 2014, and is scheduled to conclude on November 1, 2014. The march participants plan to take part in the PCM by interrupting their march for four days and traveling by bus from Ohio to New York City. The purpose of the convergence is to combine two historic climate marches – the largest (PCM) and the longest (The Great March). The marchers plan to return to Ohio beginning on the evening of September 21, hopefully bringing with them hundreds of new marchers from the PCM for the final six weeks of their journey. The Great March is scheduled to end just prior to the November 5 American mid-term elections.

=== Disruption (movie) ===
Disruption is a film, approximately 52 minutes long, directed by Kelly Nyks and Jared P. Scott, which is being screened at various public venues, as well as in self-hosted screenings (for example, in libraries, campuses and community centers) on September 7, 2014, exactly two weeks before the People's Climate March, and on subsequent dates prior to the march. The film was partly produced by the organization 350.org, which called the PCM. On the evening of September 7, one of the free public screenings, which will take place at The New School in New York City, "will include a follow-up Q&A with some of the climate movement's most recognized leaders, some of whom are featured in the film."

According to 350.org, the film's title refers to "the dangerous environmental tipping points after which the entire climate system could spiral out of control, as well as the need for a mass social movement to disrupt the status quo and business-as-usual approach which is inhibiting the bold actions necessary to protect the planet's future."

According to the event organizers, the film "takes the viewer on a fast-paced journey through the tangled world of climate change: the science, the politics, the solutions, and the stories that define this crisis at this pivotal point in human history. This is a movie by and for the movement." The film also seeks to answer the question "When it comes to climate change, why do we do so little when we know so much?"

The film also argues that the environment crisis impacts other movements, such as that for social justice, as marginalized people stand to suffer most from the ravages of climate change. In a clip from the film, Eddie Bautista, executive director for the New York City Environmental Justice Alliance and one of the PCM's leading organizers, states, "This is not just about the environment, it's about the community, it's about jobs, it's about justice." Author Naomi Klein says in the film, "We have a responsibility to rise to our historic moment."

The film can be viewed online.

=== New York City Climate Convergence ===
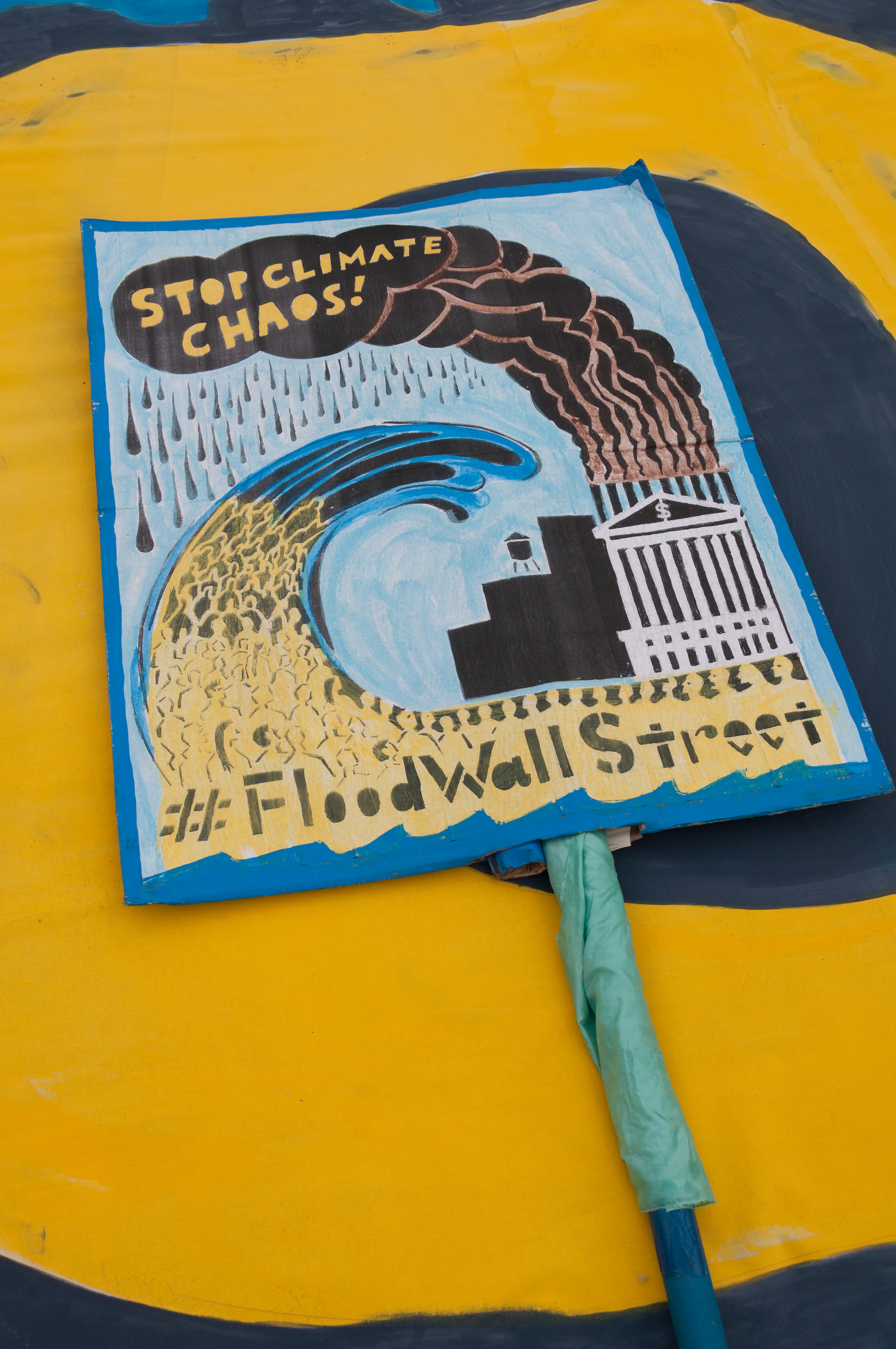
A sign promoting related Twitter hashtag #FloodWallStreet.

The New York City Climate Convergence is a coalition formed by two political activist environmental organizations, System Change Not Climate Change (SCNCC) and the Global Climate Convergence (GCC). During the weekend of the climate march, the organization will hold two plenaries and a number of workshops that will focus on what the organizers claim are the economic causes of climate change, and on ways in which the system can be altered, so that the world will begin to value "people, planet and peace over profit". According to the coalition's website, the "GCC recently rose to prominence when it organized a series of climate actions connecting to the labour and environmental movements (the social and ecological) in a campaign called 'Mother Earth Day to May Day 2014.' SCNCC, an 'ecosocialist' coalition arose out of multiple socialist and activists [sic] organizations in the aftermath of Hurricane Sandy which devastated New York city [sic]."

The coalition, as well as other groups espousing various forms of direct action, has been cited as furnishing "opportunities to build a stronger and more effective climate justice movement". The coalition is demanding:

- "Millions of jobs in renewable energy, conservation, and public transit
- A just transition from fossil fuels and nuclear power
- New food, water, and sanitation systems
- An emergency transition to a new kind of economy
- Tax the rich and slash the military budget."

The Opening Plenary for the New York City Climate Convergence, to be held on Friday evening, September 19 in midtown Manhattan, will include as speakers Bolivian water rights activist Oscar Olivera, Philippine trade unionist leader Josua Mata, Erica Violet Lee of the indigenous rights group Idle No More, hip hop artist and activist Immortal Technique, Anne Petermann of the Global Justice Ecology Project and Nastaran Mohit of the New York State Nurses Association. The Closing Plenary, to be held on the following night, will include as speakers the well-known author and activist Naomi Klein (The Shock Doctrine), Jacqui Patterson of the NAACP Environmental & Climate Justice Program, Desmond D'Sa, the 2014 Goldman Prize recipient from South Africa and Olga Bautista of the Southeast Side Coalition Against Petcoke. Workshops will also be held during the day on September 20.

=== Flood Wall Street ===
The day after the People's Climate March, on September 22, several thousand protesters participated in Flood Wall Street, which blocked traffic in New York's Financial District for much of the day. The action was presented as a response to a call by the Climate Justice Alliance, a network of groups on the front-lines of climate change, to call corporate America to account for its role in pollution. Explaining the rationale, journalist (and Flood Wall Street participant) Nathan Schneider wrote in Al Jazeera America, "Climate change is war – and Wall Street is winning." Approximately 100 people were arrested by the end of the day, of which 10 faced trial and were found not guilty on March 5, 2015.

== Other global actions ==
=== Major global marches ===
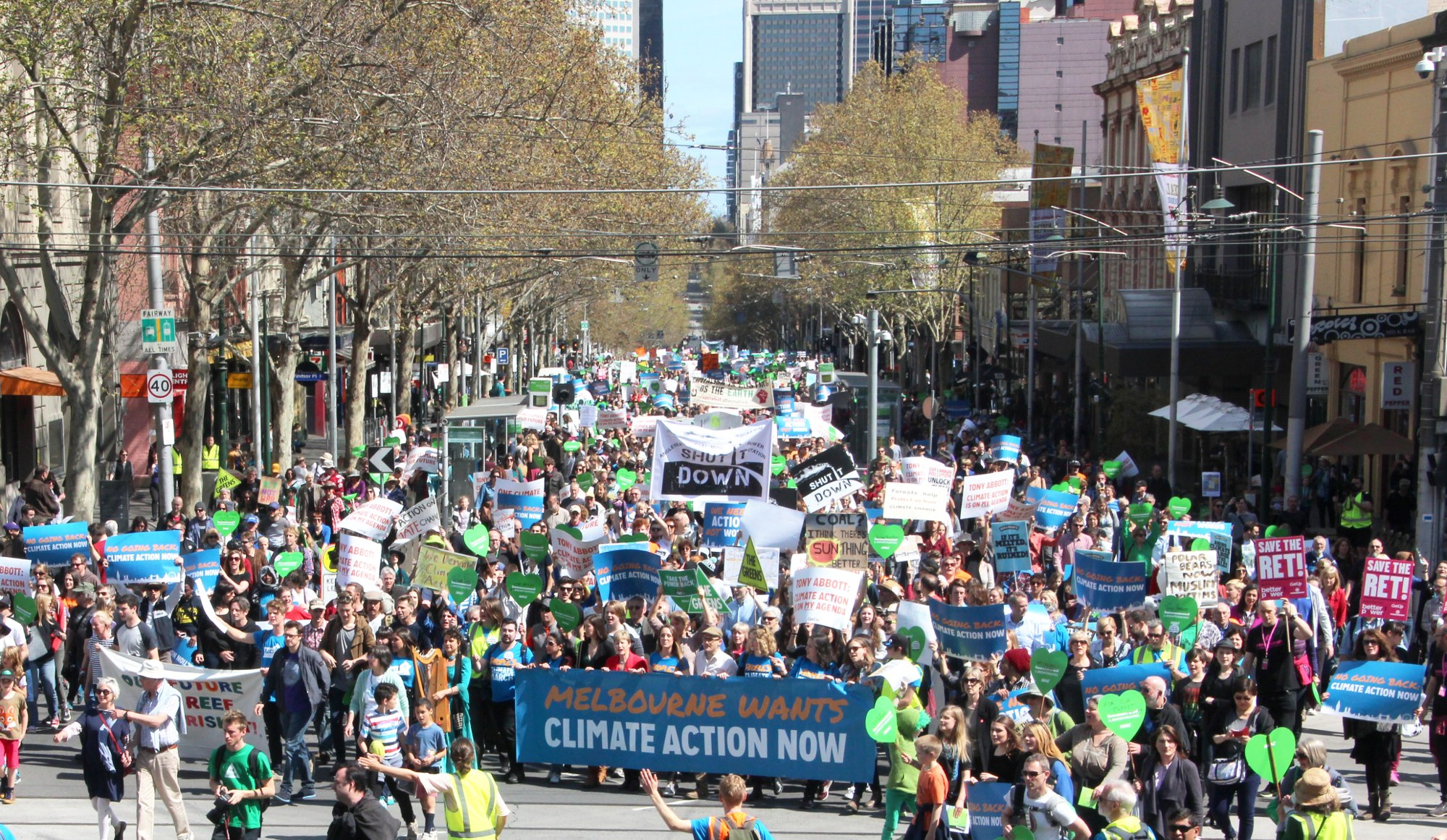
30,000 people marching in Melbourne

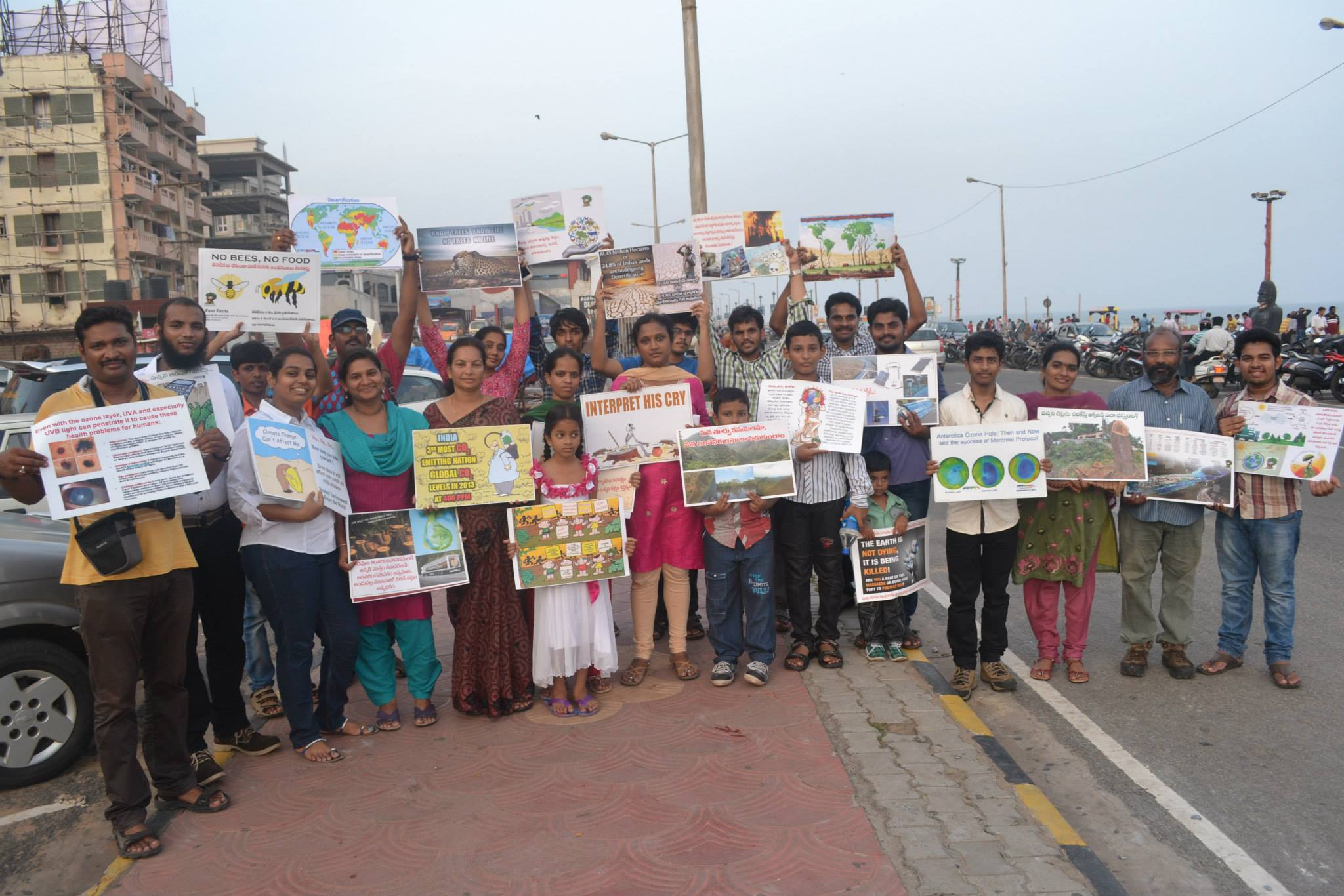
People's Climate March event in Visakhapatnam (India)

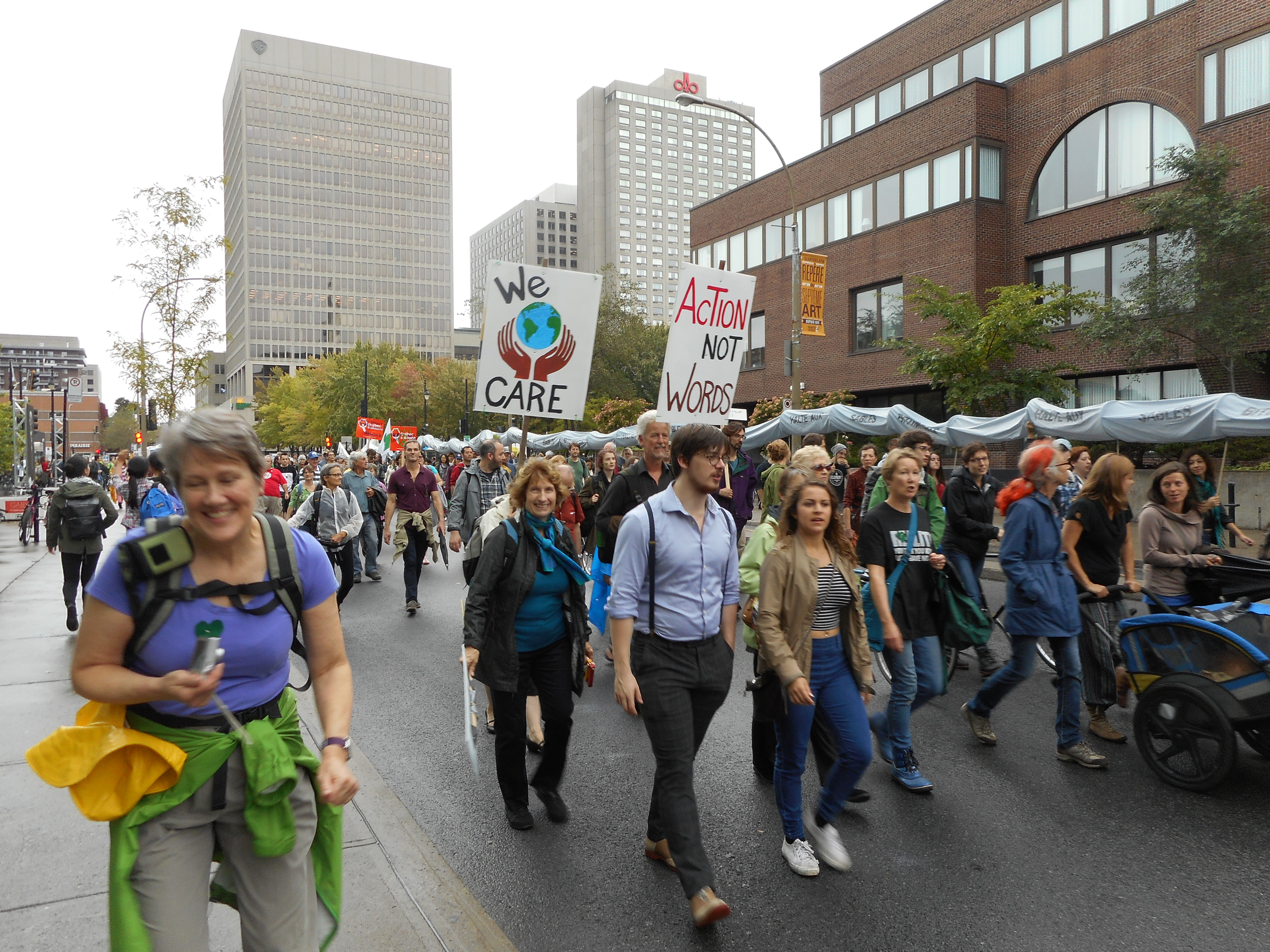
Climate March in Montreal Marche mondiale pour le climat

The BBC reported an estimated 600,000 people turned out for events in 156 countries. The following are other major global marches related to the PCM. Organizers urged those in the geographic vicinity of one of the following marches who had transportation access to that place, to attend that particular march, rather than start a new, smaller one. (Please note: all times and locations are for Sunday, September 21, unless otherwise noted.)

- Berlin, 4:00 PM (Berlin time); start: Brandenburg Gate; end: Potsdamer Platz
- Bogotá, 10:00 am (Bogotá time); start: Parque Nacional; end: Plaza de los Periodistas
- New Delhi, 9:00 am, Saturday, September 20 (New Delhi time); Central Delhi (start and end locations undetermined)
- Istanbul, 11:00 am, Saturday, September 20 (Istanbul time); start: Tobacco Warehouse Lüleci Hendek Street No. 12
- Johannesburg, 7:30 PM, Friday, September 19 (Johannesburg time); start: 2 Miriam Makeba Drive, Newtown
- Lagos, 10:00 am, Monday, September 22 (Lagos time); start: Alausa, Lagos
- London, 12:30 PM (London time); start: Temple Place; end: Parliament House
- Melbourne: 30,000 people marched through the CBD, from the State Library to Treasury Gardens.
- Paris, 2:00 PM (Paris time); start: Place de la République; end: Hôtel de Ville Metro station
- Rio de Janeiro, 10:30 am (Rio time); start: Ipanema, Posto 8

== See also ==
- Environmental politics
- IPCC Fifth Assessment Report
- List of environmental protests
- March for Science (22 April 2017)
- Paris Agreement
- Politics of global warming
