= American-Soviet Peace Walks =

During the 20th century, a number of peace walks were organized involving the citizens of the United States and the USSR. These peace walks, or peace marches, represented citizen diplomacy initiatives promoting peace and nuclear disarmament through direct person-to-person interaction among the citizens of the two Cold War opponent states.

== 1960-61 San Francisco to Moscow Walk for Peace ==
A peace walk from San Francisco, US, to Moscow, USSR, took place from December 1960 to October 1961. The walk was organized by Committee for Nonviolent Action and promoted nonviolence and unilateral nuclear disarmament.

=== Resources ===
==== Books and book chapters ====
- Lyttle, Bradford. (1966). You Come with Naked Hands: The Story of the San Francisco to Moscow Walk for Peace. Raymond, N.H: Greenleaf Books.
- Lehmann, J. (1966). We walked to Moscow. Raymond, N.H: Greenleaf Books.
- Deming, Barabara. "The long walk for peace: new mission to Moscow". In Christman, H. M. (1964). Peace and arms. New York: Sheed and Ward.

==== Journal articles ====
Wernicke, Gunter and Wittner, Lawrence S. (1999)

==== Newspaper articles ====
- United Press International. (1961, October 4).
- Associated Press. (1961, October 4).

==== Other ====
- Syracuse Peace Council (October 16, 1961).
- David N. Rich - San Francisco to Moscow - Walk for Peace 1960 - 1961.

== 1987 Leningrad to Moscow Walk ==
A 450-mile peace walk from Leningrad (now Saint Petersburg) to Moscow in the USSR took place from June 15 to July 8, 1987. The walk, intended to promote peace and help end the nuclear arms race, was organized by the International Peace Walk, Inc. About 230 American and 200 Soviet citizens took part in the walk. To mark the conclusion of the walk, the first rock concert featuring American and Soviet performers took place at the Ismailovo Stadium in Moscow on the 4 July, symbolically coinciding with the Independence Day holiday in the U.S.

=== Resources ===
==== Books ====
- Segal, F., & Basten, F. E. (1988).
- Graham, B., & Greenfield, R. (2004).

==== Journal articles ====
Brigham, S. (October 1, 2010).

==== Newspaper articles ====
===== Houston Chronicle =====
HODGES, ANN (1987-07-24). "Billy Joel laid back in Russia". Houston Chronicle. p. 1. ISSN 1074-7109.

===== Chicago Tribune =====
Chicago Tribune wires (1987-06-20). "AMERICANS, SOVIETS JOIN IN 'PEACE WALK'". Chicago Tribune. p. 1. ISSN 1085-6706.

===== Sun Sentinel =====
DARREN ALLEN, Staff Writer (1987-05-04). "PAIR JOINS PEACE TREK IN USSR AMERICANS, SOVIETS TO WALK 450 MILES". Sun Sentinel. pp. 5.B.

===== The Washington Post =====
Donna Acquaviva (1987-06-11). "Peace Marchers Meet in Loudoun; Disarmament Activists Prepare for 450-Mile Trek Across Russia". The Washington Post. pp. v.18. ISSN 0190-8286.

===== Seattle Times =====
JAMIE SIMONS, JON LAPIDESE (1987-07-28). "WALK'S DRIVING FORCE GOES EXTRA MILE FOR U.S.-SOVIET RELATIONS". Seattle Times. pp. F.1. ISSN 0745-9696.

LARRY STENBERG (1987-06-29). "THOUSANDS GATHER IN SOVIET UNION TO GREET PEACE WALKERS". Seattle Times. pp. D.3. ISSN 0745-9696.

LARRY STENBERG (1987-07-28). "REMEMBERING RUSSIA: AFTER THE WALK – BENEATH THE POLITICS, FRIENDLY PEOPLE WITH A PASSION FOR PEACE". Seattle Times. pp. F.1. ISSN 0745-9696.

===== Minneapolis Star and Tribune =====
Kathleen Hendrix (1987-06-28). "Soviet-American peace walk captivates people in U.S.S.R.". Minneapolis Star and Tribune. pp. 22.A. ISSN 0744-5458.

===== San Francisco Chronicle =====
Leah Garchik (1987-05-08). "PERSONALS". San Francisco Chronicle. p. 10.

MAITLAND ZANE (1987-06-02). "Hiking a Long Soviet Road for Peace". San Francisco Chronicle. p. 37.

Kathleen Hendrix, Los Angeles Times (1987-06-25). "Soviet City Welcomes Peace Marchers". San Francisco Chronicle. p. 16.

"EAST BAY / Lafayette Report On Peace Walk". San Francisco Chronicle. 1987-07-13. p. 21.

===== The Boston Globe =====
Steve Morse, Globe Staff (1987-10-09). "'ROCK 'N' ROLL SUMMIT' IS TIP-TOP". The Boston Globe. p. 48. ISSN 0743-1791.

===== The Philadelphia Inquirer =====
Walter F Naedele (1988-07-16). "THE PATH TO PUBLICITY WALKERS, RUNNERS AND BICYCLISTS ARE TRAVELING THE COUNTRY FOR CAUSES". The Philadelphia Inquirer. pp. D.1. ISSN 0885-6613.

===== Chicago Sun-Times =====
"A walk for peace Series: MARCH TO MOSCOW / A PHOTO DIARY". Chicago Sun-Times. 1987-06-14. p. 20.

"American visitors, Soviet hosts go a great distance to become closer". Chicago Sun-Times. 1987-07-05. p. 6.

"March ends peacefully". Chicago Sun-Times. 1987-07-05. p. 24.

"A walk for peace Series: MARCH TO MOSCOW / A PHOTO DIARY – Chicago Sun-Times". Chicago Sun-Times. June 14, 1987. Archived from the original on 2012-11-06 – via HighBeam Research.

===== The Vancouver Sun =====
"400 Soviets, Americans start walking for peace". The Vancouver Sun. 1987-06-19. pp. A.19. ISSN 0832-1299.

===== Los Angeles Times =====
DOUG BROWN (1988-03-14). "Peace Marcher Is Hoping to Persuade the World to Follow in Her Steps". Los Angeles Times. p. 3. ISSN 0458-3035.

- Hendrix, Kathleen. (1987, April 7).
- Hendrix, Kathleen. (1987, June 12).
- Hendrix, Kathleen. (1987, June 15).
- Hendrix, Kathleen. (1987, June 18).
- Hendrix, Kathleen. (1987, June 24).
- Hendrix, Kathleen. (1987, June 26).
- Hendrix, Kathleen. (1987, July 1).
- Hendrix, Kathleen. (1987, July 3).
- Hendrix, Kathleen. (1987, July 5).
- Hendrix, Kathleen. (1987, July 9).
- Hilburn, Robert. (1987, July 8).
- Simons, Jamie and Lapidese, Jon. (1987, July 5).
- Simons, Jamie and Lapidese, Jon. (1987, July 5).
- Willman, Chris. (1987, October 24).

===== The New York Times =====
SEVERO, RICHARD (1989-03-20). "Soviet-American Group Plans Voyage for Peace". The New York Times. pp. B.3. ISSN 0362-4331.

- Taubman, Philip. (1987, July 5).

==== Magazine articles ====
Janet Kinosian (July 1987)

==== Online resources ====
- OurMove.org offers a detailed, annotated photographic account of the American Soviet Peace Walk, which took place on the 450 kilometer stretch between St. Petersburg (then Leningrad) and Moscow, Russia, in the summer of 1987. Ourmove.org is based on a 1988 book by Fred Segal & Fred E. Basten, "American Soviet Walk: Taking Steps to End the Nuclear Arms Race," published by the United World of the Universe Foundation.

"Saying No To Power Autobiography of a 20th Century Activist and Thinker," by William Mandel.

== 1988 Washington D.C. to Santa Monica and San Francisco ==
In June–July 1988, The American Soviet Peace Walk (ASPW) sponsored by the International Peace Walk, Inc. (IPW), organized and sponsored 230 Soviets citizens and 200 Americans from all walks of life. They started their travels from Washington, D.C. went on to Santa Monica, CA and continued on to San Francisco, to experience the America way of life.

On July 16, 1988, the final concert was organized and produced by Summer of Love Productions Producers, Ron Frazier and Bill McCarthy, who had hosted the previous June concert event for the marchers in Los Angeles.

On July 16, 1988, the American Soviet Peace Walk concert finale happened at the Band Shell in San Francisco's Golden Gate Park with an estimated public attendance of more than 25,000. The Producers gave many thanks to all participants, the volunteers, and performing friends of the Summer of Love 20th Anniversary 1987 series. They benefited the San Francisco Food Bank and ran through to the Concert of July 16, 1988. Congratulations were given to both the American and Soviet Performing Artists of the "American Soviet Peace Walk Concert". Participants and performances achieved the results as Change Makers that had advanced the cause for Peace and People-to-People Awareness. Artists' performances in concerts with Global attention were needed as an ongoing effort to sustain awareness of and for Peace.

Special Thanks go to; Susan Ramser, Producers Assistant who hosted the Soviet Artists on their arrival to San Francisco with the help of a Cadillac mini-fleet, Arthur Meyer, artistic director, and to Pete Sears of the original Jefferson Starship who assisted in the musical coordination and inviting cause-aware musician friends to participate. He organized the final musical portion of the show, as well as playing piano with each act. The Crowd was pleased by Mr. Jerry Garcia helped to promote the event, Pete Sears was responsible for Jerry's appearance. The Recreation and Parks Department prohibited advertising because they were concerned about fans camping and overcrowding, and so the concert happened without mainstream advertisement. But with the assisted word of mouth promotion, and one free newspaper paragraph event notice and the 1988 finale Poster presented 3 days out, all led to the success of the event.

Guest Artists Performers: ALEXANDER GRADSKY, TIME MACHINE, COLLECTIVE VISION, THE TELEPHONE TRUST, YKRANIAN WOMEN'S CHOUS, THE SOVIET YOUTH PERFORMERS...Friends of Summer of Love and special invites; BABA OLATUNJI, JERRY GARCIA. MICKEY HART, GRACE SLICK, MERL SAUNDERS, MIMI FARINA, JOHN CIPPOLINA, PETE SEARS, ZERO, NORTON BUFFALO, MARK BENNO, EMMIT POWELL & THE GOSPELL ELITES, OGIE YOCHA, and surprise guest PAUL KANTNER. The American Soviet Peace Walk 1988 Poster & Beyond Web-Wall

=== Resources ===
==== Newspaper articles ====
- News Advisory. (1988, June 17).
- Rubin, Trudy. (1988, June 29).
- Westside Digest. (1988, June 30).
- Ziaya, Christine. (1988, July 8).
- Hendrix, Kathleen. (1988, July 15).

== 1988 Odessa to Kiev Walk ==
About 460 American and Soviet citizens walked for peace from Odessa to Kiev in the Ukrainian SSR over five weeks in late summer of 1988.

=== Resources ===
==== Newspaper articles ====
"Americans Gather To Plan 'Peace Walk' In Soviet Union"

==== Other ====
Martin, James.

== 1990 Peace Walk in the Russian North ==
About 80 Americans and 120 Soviets calling themselves "Russian North," participated in an international peace walk, passing through cities like Archangelsk and Severodvinsk. The march promoted nonviolence and a ban on nuclear testing. On the first day we went to Red Square and stayed the night in Khotkovo.

== Materials Referencing Multiple Walks ==
This section includes materials that contain references to more than one peace walk, such as reviews of events which span longer time periods and historical trends.

=== Resources ===
==== Journal articles ====
Sherbakova, V. A. (2009)

Subheadings

- American-Soviet "Peace March" June 16 – July 19, 1988.
- The 20 Year Anniversary of the Soviet-American Peace Walk: Odessa-Kiev.
- Address to all governments and peoples.
- Soviet-American Meeting for Peace, October 12–18, 1990.

== See also ==
- Citizen diplomacy
- Great Peace March for Global Nuclear Disarmament
- Peace walk
