= Richard Sherzan =

American politician (born 1946)

Member of the Iowa House of Representatives
- In office January 8, 1979 – January 11, 1981

Personal details
- Born: December 22, 1946 (age 79) Mobile, Alabama, U.S.
- Party: Democratic
- Relatives: Gary, Helen, Michael (brothers and sister)
- Occupation: Retired (2014) Administrative Law Judge
- Military career
- Allegiance: United States
- Branch: Army
- Wars: Vietnam War
- Awards: Purple Heart Award; and Bronze Star Award with "V" Device

Richard E. Sherzan (born December 22, 1946) is an American politician who served as a member of the Iowa House of Representatives from 1979 to 1981.

Sherzan was born in Mobile, Alabama, to Gloria and Edward Sherzan. He grew up in Des Moines, Iowa. He moved to Arizona in 1983, and then returned to live in Iowa, in 2021. He has an M.A., Master's degree, in American History, University of Iowa, and a J.D. degree from Drake University Law School, in Des Moines. In 1976, he was Polk County, Iowa, Coordinator for the Mo Udall presidential campaign. He served in the Iowa State Legislature, House of Representatives, from 1979 to 1981, after a year long, door-to-door campaign.

While living in Arizona, he worked as a law clerk with the Maricopa County Attorney's Office (Civil Division); Arizona Attorney General's Office (Criminal Division); and private law firms (self-employed). He has a Community College Teacher Certification (Law, History) from Arizona; and has been a part-time Community College Teacher, and substitute teacher, K-12. In 2014, after working 17 years, he retired, as an Administrative Law Judge, from the Arizona Dept. of Economic Security, Unemployment Insurance Office of Appeals. He is a U.S. Army, Vietnam War Veteran, with Honorable Discharge; Purple Heart Award; and Bronze Star Award with "V" Device (heroism in ground combat, Vietnam). He also protested the Vietnam War.

In Arizona, Sherzan was a candidate for the U.S. Senate in the state's Democratic Party primary elections of 2016 and 2018.

On October 13, 2025, Sherzan announced his intent to seek the Democratic nomination in Iowa's 2026 U.S. Senate election.
