= Prairie Queen Recreation Area =

Parkland in Nebraska, USA

- Location within Nebraska
- Location: Sarpy County, Nebraska, USA
- Nearest city: Papillion, Nebraska
- Coordinates: 41°09′53″N 96°06′47″W
- Area: 260 to 335 acres (105 to 136 ha)
- Governing body: Multiple

Prairie Queen Recreation Area is located in northcentral Sarpy County, Nebraska, U.S. and approximately 10 miles (16 km) west of downtown Omaha. Prairie Queen consists of between 260 and 335 acres (105 and 136 ha) of parkland of which 135 acres (55 ha) is an artificial reservoir. The recreation area opened in 2015 as part of Papio-Missouri River Natural Resources District efforts to provide flood control and improve recreation opportunities. The recreation area is near Werner Park and served by a road with bicycle lanes.

Prairie Queen Recreation Area is part of ongoing flood control initiatives, with dam construction and water impoundments creating fishing opportunities and increasing wetlands. Groundbreaking for the recreation area was held in 2012 and the project was budgeted at 14.5 million dollars. The recreation area has a boat ramp, picnic areas and 4 miles (6.4 km) of hike/bike paths. Prairie Queen Recreation Area is named after a one-room-schoolhouse that stood on the site that was used from the years 1884 to 1957. After that the school was used as the Papillion Grange Hall until 2002.

Project partners include Papio-Missouri River Natural Resource District, City of Papillion, Sarpy County, Nebraska and the Nebraska Game and Parks Commission.
