= Sunset Park (Nevada) =

Park in Las Vegas

Sunset Regional Park
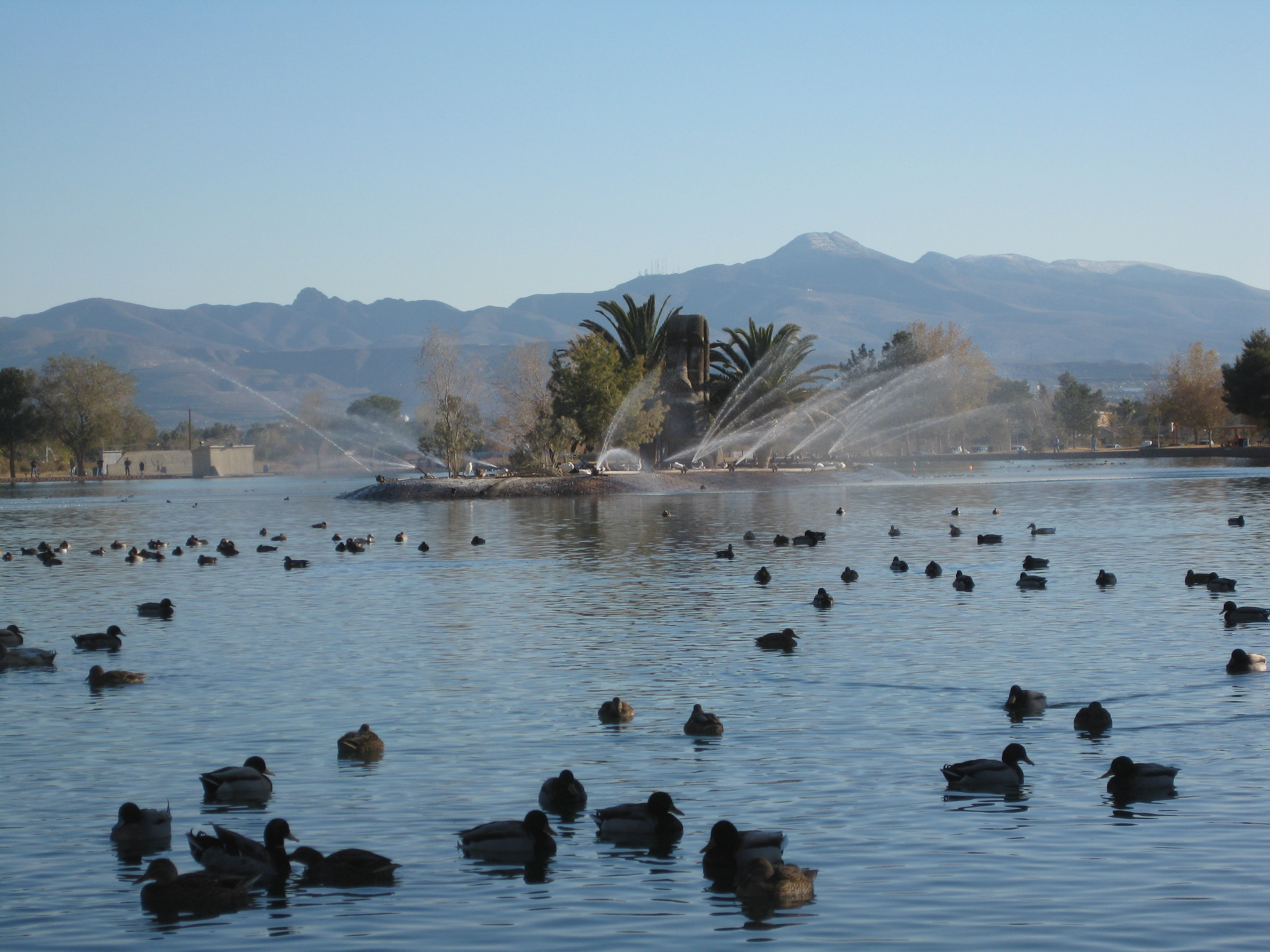
- Interactive map of Sunset Regional Park
- Type: Public
- Location: 2601 East Sunset Road; Paradise, Nevada
- Coordinates: 36°3′57″N 115°6′42″W
- Opened: 1967
- Administrator: Clark County Parks & Recreation
- Website: www.clarkcountynv.gov/parks

Sunset Regional Park is located near Harry Reid International Airport in the southeast part of Las Vegas Valley. Located near the Tomiyasu neighborhood in Paradise, the park is bordered by Sunset Road on the north, Eastern Avenue on the west and Warm Springs Road on the south.

== History ==
The land was first developed by John F. Miller, who acquired the property from the federal government in 1909. At the time, land was being given away for agricultural development. He drilled three wells and built the Miller Ranch. In 1939 the ranch was sold to J. Kell Houssels, veteran hotelier and casino operator. He sold the property to a group of investors in 1963. The county bought the land in 1967 and turned what was then called Houssels Ranch into the valley’s third county park. In 1968 the name was changed to Sunset Park.

== Sunset Park Pond ==
Sunset Park Pond is around 14 acres (57,000 m^{2}) in surface area and 10 to 12 feet (3.7 m) deep. It is home to various species of water fowl and fish.

Sunset Park Pond features a giant stone Moai, of the type found in Easter Island, Chile, carved of stone originally for the Aku Aku Restaurant, where it stood at the restaurant's entrance at the Stardust Hotel in Las Vegas. The moai was moved to Sunset Park Pond after the closing of Aku Aku, in an effort spearheaded by Paulina Jimeno de Bosch, mother of the Consul of Chile in Las Vegas, Paulina Biggs Sparkuhl.

== Recreation ==
=== Fishing ===
Fishing is available year-round in the pond. The State of Nevada Department of Fish and Wildlife stocks the pond weekly with rainbow trout from November to March, and with channel catfish monthly from April to October. Other species include bluegill, redear sunfish, black crappie and largemouth bass.

=== Sporting facilities ===
The park contains several softball and little-league fields as well as basketball, volleyball, and tennis courts. One 27-hole disc-golf court is located on the western edge of the park and is 7,608 ft (2,319 m) by 8,775 ft (2,675 m) in size.

=== Other facilities ===
There are 31 picnic areas with capacities ranging from 50 to 1,000 people. There are four walking trails totaling 3.5 miles of pathway.

== Events and Entertainment ==
=== Las Vegas Renaissance Fair ===
During the fall, Clark County's Parks and Recreation hosts the annual Age of Chivalry Renaissance Festival in Sunset Park.

=== Gift of Lights ===
From 2000–2009, Sunset Park hosted a drive-through holiday light show called the Gift of Lights. Beginning with the 2010 holiday season, the show was moved to the Las Vegas Motor Speedway.
