= Citizen diplomacy =

Issues of diplomacy

Citizen diplomacy is the political concept of average citizens engaging as representatives of a country or cause either inadvertently or by design. Citizen diplomacy may take place when official channels are not reliable or desirable. For example, if two countries do not formally recognize each other's governments, citizen diplomacy may be an ideal tool of statecraft. Citizen diplomacy does not have to be direct negotiations between two parties, but can take the form of scientific exchanges, cultural exchanges, and international athletic events. Citizen diplomats can be students, teachers, athletes, artists, business people, humanitarians, adventurers or tourists. They are often motivated by a responsibility to engage with the rest of the world in a meaningful, mutually beneficial dialogue.

Citizen diplomacy can complement official diplomacy or subvert it. Some nations ban track-two diplomacy when they run counter to official foreign policy.

== History ==
Robert W. Fuller was one of the first people to call themselves a citizen diplomat, after he used his position as the president of Oberlin College to plan cultural exchanges to alleviate the Cold War. After the collapse of the Soviet Union, Fuller continued this work in political hot spots around the world and developed the idea of reducing rankism to promote peace. The term citizen diplomat did not enter wider usage until 1981.

The phrase "citizen diplomacy" was the watchword of the Citizen Exchange Corps, founded by Stephen Daniel James and Denise James, which conducted cultural exchanges between the United States and the Soviet Union in the 1960s, 1970s and 1980s. Anti-nuclear groups like Clamshell Alliance and ECOLOGIA have sought to thwart US policy through "grassroots" initiatives with Soviet and (later) former Soviet groups.

== See also ==
- Facebook diplomacy
- Peacemakers
