= Gary Sherzan =

American politician

Gary C. Sherzan

Member of the Iowa House of Representatives
- In office January 10, 1983 – January 10, 1993

Personal details
- Born: May 16, 1944 (age 82) Mobile, Alabama, United States
- Party: Democrat
- Spouse: Vickie Lynn Hood
- Children: four
- Occupation: parole officer

Gary C. Sherzan (born May 16, 1944) is an American politician in the state of Iowa.

Sherzan was born in Mobile, Alabama. He attended Drake University and was a parole officer. A Democrat, he served in the Iowa House of Representatives from 1983 to 1993 (86th district). His brother Richard Sherzan also served in the Iowa House, from 1979 to 1981.
