= Lake Manawa State Park =

State park in Pottawattamie County, Iowa

Coordinates: 41.198°N 95.858°W

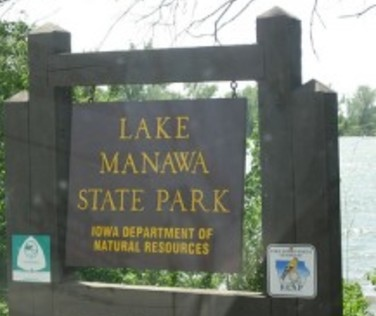

Lake Manawa State Park is located in Council Bluffs, Iowa. It is based around Lake Manawa, a lake created by Missouri River flooding during the late 1800's, located in southwest Council Bluffs.

== Facilities and activities ==
The campground provides space for 72 camping units, and 37 of these spaces are equipped with electrical hookups. There are facilities for modern showers and restrooms at the campground in addition to a trailer dump station. Half of the units are reserved, the other half are open on a first-serve basis.

The lake offers boating options to motors of any size. Ramps are located on all sides of the lake with the exception of the east side. Rented paddle boats and canoes are available at the beach area. Boating access is also possible for the Missouri River.

Fishing is another popular activity at Lake Manawa. Crappies, bluegills, and catfish are among the common fish caught.

The lake offers a beach for swimmers and sunbathers that also offers refreshments.

A paved trail through nature offers trail-goers the opportunity to walk or ride along the shore line. The Manawa trail connects to the Western Trails Center, Council Bluffs trail system, and the Wabash Trace trail.

The park offers several locations for family picnics, parties and outdoor events. There are open picnic shelters around the lake and may be reserved online. There is a shelter that provides kitchen facilities.
