= Arizona's 5th congressional district =

U.S. House district for Arizona

Coordinates: 33°20′22″N 111°42′43″W

- Interactive map of district boundaries since January 3, 2023
- Representative: Andy Biggs; R–Gilbert
- Area: 1,423 mi^{2} (3,690 km^{2})
- Distribution: 86.9% urban; 13.0% rural
- Population (2025): 913,137
- Median household income: $112,878
- Ethnicity: 67.1% White; 17.8% Hispanic; 5.9% Asian; 4.5% Two or more races; 3.5% Black; 0.8% Native American; 0.6% other
- Cook PVI: R+10

Arizona's 5th congressional district is a congressional district located in the U.S. state of Arizona, represented by Republican Andy Biggs.

The district contains Gilbert, Queen Creek, southern and eastern Chandler, and eastern Mesa. It is within eastern Maricopa County and northern Pinal County, and includes most of the East Valley. Its representative, Andy Biggs, was elected in November 2016.

== History ==
Arizona picked up a fifth district as a result of the redistricting cycle after the 1980 census. It covered most of the southeastern portion of the state, though the bulk of its population was located in the eastern half of Tucson. It was a Republican-leaning swing district, though a Democrat won it when it was first contested in 1982 before giving way to a Republican in 1984.

After the 2000 census, this district essentially became the 8th district, while most of the Maricopa County portion of the old 6th district became the new 5th district. This version of the 5th covered all of Tempe and Scottsdale and portions of Chandler, Mesa and the Ahwatukee section of Phoenix. Although Republicans outnumbered Democrats by about 40,000 voters, the 5th district was considered far less conservative than other suburban Phoenix districts. George W. Bush received 54% of the vote in this district in 2004 and home state candidate John McCain narrowly won the district in 2008 with 51.70% of the vote while Barack Obama received 47.17%.

After the 2010 census, this district mostly became the 9th district, while the 5th was reconfigured to take in most of the East Valley. This area had previously been the 1st district from 1951 to 2003 and the 6th district from 2003 to 2013. Like its predecessors, this district was heavily Republican.

After the 2020 census, this district, and the West Valley-based 8th, were the only two districts to remain in substantially the same areas. The revised 5th district still covers part of eastern Maricopa County and northern Pinal County, including Apache Junction. In Maricopa County it is basically south of downtown Phoenix and the Salt River and east of Rt. 101. It is the only Valley-based district that does not include any of Phoenix itself..

== Composition ==
For the 118th and successive Congresses (based on redistricting following the 2020 census), the district contains the following counties and communities:

Maricopa County (5)
Chandler (part; also 4th), Gilbert, Mesa (part; also 1st and 4th) Sun Lakes, Queen Creek

Pinal County (3)
Apache Junction, Gold Canyon (part; also 2nd), San Tan Valley

== Recent election results from statewide races ==
Year	Office	Results
2003–2013 Boundaries
2004	President	Bush 54.1% - 45.3%
2008	President	McCain 51.7% - 47.2%
2010	Senate	McCain 60.9% - 33.0%
2010	Governor	Brewer 52.4% - 44.2%
2010	Secretary of State	Bennett 59.3% - 40.6%
2010	Attorney General	Horne 50.7% - 49.1%
2010	Treasurer	Ducey 53.6% - 39.9%
2013–2023 Boundaries
2008	President	McCain 62.6% - 36.3%
2010	Senate	McCain 67.5% - 24.9%
2010	Governor	Brewer 63.7% - 32.8%
2012	President	Romney 63.8% - 34.6%
2012	Senate	Flake 60.1% - 35.5%
2014	Governor	Ducey 62.8% - 32.6%
2016	President	Trump 57.6% - 36.5%
2016	Senate	McCain 62.9% - 31.2%
2018	Senate	McSally 55.5% - 42.3%
2018	Governor	Ducey 64.1% - 34.1%
2018	Attorney General	Brnovich 60.7% - 39.2%
2020	President	Trump 56.5% - 41.9%
2020	Senate (Spec.)	McSally 56.5% - 43.5%
2023–2033 Boundaries
2016	President	Trump 56.6% - 35.3%
2016	Senate	McCain 62.8% - 31.2%
2018	Senate	McSally 55.6% - 42.2%
2018	Governor	Ducey 64.0% - 34.0%
2020	President	Trump 57.4% - 41.0%
2020	Senate (Spec.)	McSally 57.3% - 42.7%
2022	Senate	Masters 53.9% - 44.0%
2022	Governor	Lake 56.9% - 42.8%
2022	Secretary of State	Finchem 54.8% - 45.2%
2022	Attorney General	Hamadeh 57.6% - 42.3%
2022	Treasurer	Yee 63.8% - 36.3%
2024	President	Trump 59.5% - 39.5%
2024	Senate	Lake 54.7% - 43.2%

== List of members representing the district ==
Arizona began sending a fifth member to the House after the 1980 census.

Representative	Party	Years	Cong ress	Electoral history	Description and counties
District created January 3, 1983
James F. McNulty Jr. (Bisbee)	Democratic	January 3, 1983 – January 3, 1985	98th	Elected in 1982. Lost re-election.	1983–1993: Southeast Arizona, including parts of Tucson: Cochise, Greenlee, Graham (part), Pima (part), Pinal (part), Santa Cruz (part)
Jim Kolbe (Bisbee)	Republican	January 3, 1985 – January 3, 2003	99th 100th 101st 102nd 103rd 104th 105th 106th 107th	Elected in 1984. Re-elected in 1986. Re-elected in 1988. Re-elected in 1990. Re-elected in 1992. Re-elected in 1994. Re-elected in 1996. Re-elected in 1998. Re-elected in 2000. Redistricted to the 8th district.	1983–1993: Southeast Arizona, including parts of Tucson: Cochise, Greenlee, Graham (part), Pima (part), Pinal (part), Santa Cruz (part)
Jim Kolbe (Bisbee)	Republican	January 3, 1985 – January 3, 2003	99th 100th 101st 102nd 103rd 104th 105th 106th 107th	Elected in 1984. Re-elected in 1986. Re-elected in 1988. Re-elected in 1990. Re-elected in 1992. Re-elected in 1994. Re-elected in 1996. Re-elected in 1998. Re-elected in 2000. Redistricted to the 8th district.	1993–2003: Southeast Arizona, including parts of Tucson: Cochise, Graham (part), Pima (part), Pinal (part)
J. D. Hayworth (Scottsdale)	Republican	January 3, 2003 – January 3, 2007	108th 109th	Redistricted from the 6th district Re-elected in 2002. Re-elected in 2004. Lost re-election.	2003–2013: Maricopa (part): Parts of Metro Phoenix
Harry Mitchell (Tempe)	Democratic	January 3, 2007 – January 3, 2011	110th 111th	Elected in 2006. Re-elected in 2008. Lost re-election.	2003–2013: Maricopa (part): Parts of Metro Phoenix
David Schweikert (Fountain Hills)	Republican	January 3, 2011 – January 3, 2013	112th	Elected in 2010. Redistricted to the 6th district.	2003–2013: Maricopa (part): Parts of Metro Phoenix
Matt Salmon (Mesa)	Republican	January 3, 2013 – January 3, 2017	113th 114th	Elected in 2012. Re-elected in 2014. Retired.	2013–2023: Maricopa (part): Southeastern parts of Metro Phoenix
Andy Biggs (Gilbert)	Republican	January 3, 2017 – present	115th 116th 117th 118th 119th	Elected in 2016. Re-elected in 2018. Re-elected in 2020. Re-elected in 2022. Re-elected in 2024. Retiring to run for Governor of Arizona.	2013–2023: Maricopa (part): Southeastern parts of Metro Phoenix
Andy Biggs (Gilbert)	Republican	January 3, 2017 – present	115th 116th 117th 118th 119th	Elected in 2016. Re-elected in 2018. Re-elected in 2020. Re-elected in 2022. Re-elected in 2024. Retiring to run for Governor of Arizona.	2023–present: Maricopa (part), Pinal (part): Southeastern parts of Metro Phoenix
Mark Lamb (San Tan Valley)	Republican	Assuming office on January 3, 2027		Elected in 2026.	2023–present: Maricopa (part), Pinal (part): Southeastern parts of Metro Phoenix

== Recent election results ==
=== 1992–2002 ===
==== 2000 ====
Arizona's 5th congressional district house election, 2000
Party	Candidate	Votes	%	±%
Republican	Jim Kolbe (incumbent)	172,986	60.1	
Democratic	George Cunningham	101,564	35.3	
Green	Michael Jay Green	9,010	3.1	
Libertarian	Aage Nost	4,049	1.4	
Majority		71,422	24.8	
Total votes		287,609	100.0	
Republican hold		Swing		

=== 2002–2012 ===
==== 2002 ====
Arizona's 5th congressional district house election, 2002
Party	Candidate	Votes	%
Republican	J. D. Hayworth (incumbent)	103,870	61.2
Democratic	Chris Columbus	61,559	36.3
Libertarian	Warren Severin	4,383	2.6
Majority		42,311	24.9
Total votes		169,812	100.0
Republican win (new boundaries)			

==== 2004 ====
Arizona's 5th congressional district house election, 2004
Party	Candidate	Votes	%	±%
Republican	J. D. Hayworth (incumbent)	159,455	59.5	–1.7
Democratic	Elizabeth Rogers	102,363	38.2	+1.9
Libertarian	Michael Kielsky	6,189	2.3	–0.3
Majority		57,092	21.3	–3.6
Total votes		268,007	100.0	
Republican hold		Swing	–1.8	

==== 2006 ====
Arizona's 5th congressional district house election, 2006
Party	Candidate	Votes	%	±%
Democratic	Harry Mitchell	101,838	50.4	+12.2
Republican	J. D. Hayworth (incumbent)	93,815	46.4	–13.1
Libertarian	Warren Severin	6,357	3.1	+0.8
Majority		8,023	4.0	N/a
Total votes		202,010	100.0	
Democratic gain from Republican		Swing	+12.6	

==== 2008 ====
Arizona's 5th congressional district house election, 2008
Party	Candidate	Votes	%	±%
Democratic	Harry Mitchell (incumbent)	149,033	53.2	+2.7
Republican	David Schweikert	122,165	43.6	–2.9
Libertarian	Warren Severin	9,158	3.3	+0.1
Write-in		9	0.0	N/a
Majority		26,868	9.6	+5.6
Total votes		280,365	100.0	
Democratic hold		Swing	+2.8	

==== 2010 ====
Arizona's 5th congressional district house election, 2010
Party	Candidate	Votes	%	±%
Republican	David Schweikert	110,374	52.0	+8.4
Democratic	Harry Mitchell (incumbent)	91,749	43.2	–10.0
Libertarian	Nick Coons	10,127	4.8	+1.5
Majority		18,625	8.8	N/a
Total votes		212,250	100.0	
Republican gain from Democratic		Swing	+9.2	

=== 2012–2022 ===
==== 2012 ====
Arizona's 5th congressional district house election, 2012
Party	Candidate	Votes	%
Republican	Matt Salmon	183,470	67.2
Democratic	Spencer Morgan	89,589	32.8
Majority		93,881	34.4
Total votes		273,059	100.0
Republican win (new boundaries)			

==== 2014 ====
Arizona's 5th congressional district house election, 2014
Party	Candidate	Votes	%	±%
Republican	Matt Salmon (incumbent)	124,867	69.6	+2.4
Democratic	James Woods	54,596	30.4	–2.4
Majority		70,271	39.2	+4.8
Total votes		179,463	100.0	
Republican hold		Swing	+2.4	

==== 2016 ====
Arizona's 5th congressional district house election, 2016
Party	Candidate	Votes	%	±%
Republican	Andy Biggs	205,184	64.1	–5.5
Democratic	Talia Fuentes	114,940	35.9	+5.5
Majority		90,244	28.2	–11.0
Total votes		320,124	100.0	
Republican hold		Swing	–5.5	

==== 2018 ====
Arizona's 5th congressional district election 2018
Party	Candidate	Votes	%	±%
Republican	Andy Biggs (incumbent)	186,037	59.4	–4.7
Democratic	Joan Greene	127,027	40.6	+4.7
Majority		59,010	18.8	–9.3
Total votes		313,064	100.0	
Republican hold		Swing	–4.7	

==== 2020 ====
Arizona's 5th congressional district house election, 2020
Party	Candidate	Votes	%	±%
Republican	Andy Biggs (incumbent)	262,414	58.9	–0.5
Democratic	Joan Greene	183,171	41.1	+0.5
Write-in		72	0.0	N/a
Majority		79,243	17.8	–1.1
Total votes		445,657	100.0	
Republican hold		Swing	–0.5	

=== 2022–present ===
==== 2022 ====
Arizona's 5th congressional district house election, 2022
Party	Candidate	Votes	%
Republican	Andy Biggs (incumbent)	182,464	56.7
Democratic	Javier Ramos	120,243	37.4
Independent	Clint Smith	18,851	5.9
Write-in		32	0.0
Majority		62,221	19.3
Total votes		321,590	100.0
Republican win (new boundaries)			

==== 2024 ====
Arizona's 5th congressional district election, 2024
Party	Candidate	Votes	%	±%
Republican	Andy Biggs (incumbent)	255,628	60.4	+3.7
Democratic	Katrina Schaffner	167,680	39.6	+2.2
Majority		87,948	20.8	+1.4
Total votes		423,308	100.0	
Republican hold		Swing	+0.7	

== See also ==
- Arizona's congressional districts
- List of United States congressional districts
