= David Schweikert =

American politician (born 1962)

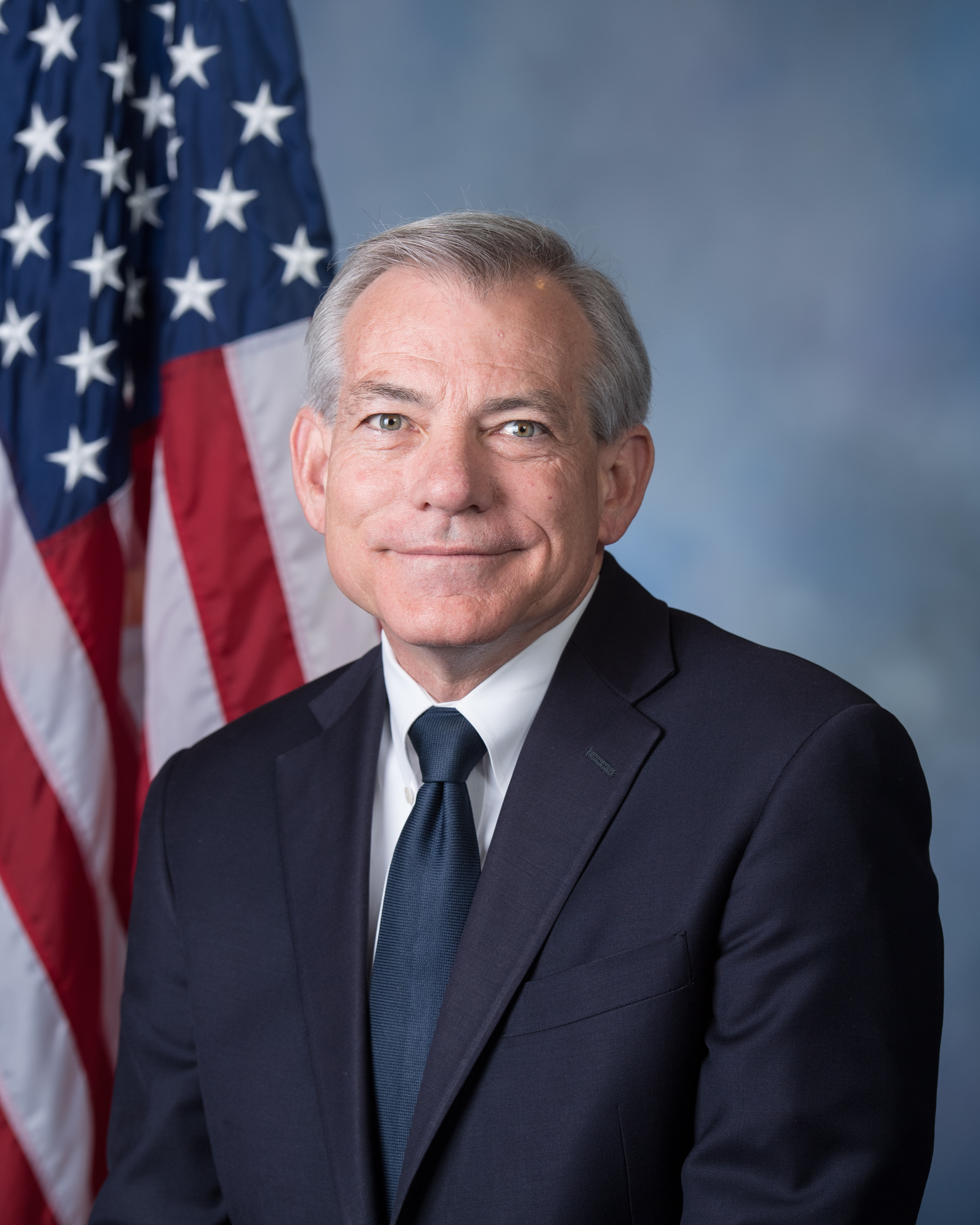
- Official portrait, 2019

Chair of the Joint Economic Committee
- Incumbent
- Assumed office January 3, 2025
- Preceded by: Martin Heinrich

Member of the U.S. House of Representatives from Arizona
- Incumbent
- Assumed office January 3, 2011
- Preceded by: Harry Mitchell
- Constituency: 5th district (2011–2013); 6th district (2013–2023); 1st district (2023–present)

Member of the Arizona House of Representatives from the 28th district
- In office January 1991 – January 1995 Serving with Lisa Graham Keegan
- Preceded by: Heinz Hink; Jim Skelly
- Succeeded by: Carolyn Allen; Wes Marsh

Personal details
- Born: David Sheridan Schweikert; March 3, 1962 (age 64) Los Angeles, California, U.S.
- Party: Republican
- Spouse: Joyce Schweikert (m. 2006)
- Children: 2
- Education: Scottsdale Community College (attended); Arizona State University, Tempe (BS, MBA)
- Website: House website Campaign website
- Schweikert's voice Schweikert reflects on political overcautiousness in his tribute to John McCain. Recorded September 6, 2018

David Sheridan Schweikert (/ˈʃwaɪkərt/ SHWY-kərt; born March 3, 1962) is an American politician and businessman serving as the U.S. representative from Arizona's 1st congressional district since 2023, previously representing the 6th congressional district from 2013 to 2023 and the 5th from 2011 to 2013. He is a member of the Republican Party. His district includes most of northern Phoenix as well as Scottsdale, Paradise Valley, and Cave Creek.

Schweikert previously served in the Arizona State House of Representatives from 1991 to 1994, chaired the state Board of Equalization from 1995 to 2004, and was Maricopa County treasurer from 2004 to 2007.

Schweikert and Paul Gosar have shared the deanship of Arizona's congressional delegation since the death of Raúl Grijalva on March 13, 2025. In September 2025, Schweikert announced that he would not run for re-election to the U.S. House and would instead seek the Republican nomination in the 2026 Arizona gubernatorial election, which he lost to fellow U.S. Representative Andy Biggs.

== Early life and education ==
Schweikert was born to an unwed teenage mother, Mary Lynn Sheridan, in Los Angeles, California. According to Schweikert, Sheridan had considered an abortion but chose instead to place him for adoption. He grew up in Scottsdale with his adoptive parents and two adopted siblings. He graduated from Saguaro High School in 1980, then earned a Bachelor of Science degree in finance and real estate in 1985 and an MBA from W.P. Carey School of Business at Arizona State University.

== Early career ==
=== Arizona House of Representatives (1991–1995) ===
Schweikert was elected to the Arizona State House of Representatives for District 28 in 1990 and reelected in 1992. He represented Fountain Hills and part of Scottsdale. He was a committee chair as a freshman and majority whip in his second term.

=== Local politics (1995–2007) ===
Schweikert was appointed chair of the Arizona State Board of Equalization, a full-time job, and served from 1995 to 2003. As chair, he oversaw billions of dollars in valuations and tax protests from Arizona citizens and businesses. There was speculation in 1999 that Arizona governor Jane Dee Hull might appoint him to the Arizona Corporation Commission.

Schweikert was appointed Chief Deputy Treasurer of Maricopa County in 2004 and elected treasurer the same year. He resigned in 2007 to run for Congress again. Professionally, he worked in real estate.

== U.S. House of Representatives ==
=== Elections ===
==== 1994 ====
Schweikert ran in the September Republican primary in Arizona's 6th congressional district. It included NE Arizona, including parts of Metro Phoenix. J. D. Hayworth defeated him, 45%–22%. After that defeat, Schweikert took time to reconsider and left for a lengthy vacation, which included travel to Kolkata, the Philippines, Myanmar, and Serbia, among other places.

==== 2008 ====
Schweikert won a six-way Republican primary election on September 2 with 30% of the vote, compared to 27% for his nearest rival, Susan Bitter Smith.

Several organizations endorsed Schweikert in the election, including the primary: Club for Growth, the Arizona Police Association, Arizona Right to Life, and the Arizona Medical Association. He received more than $500,000 from the Club for Growth.

Schweikert lost to freshman incumbent Democrat Harry Mitchell, 53%–44%. He later attributed his defeat on the very bitter primary fight that preceded it.

==== 2010 ====
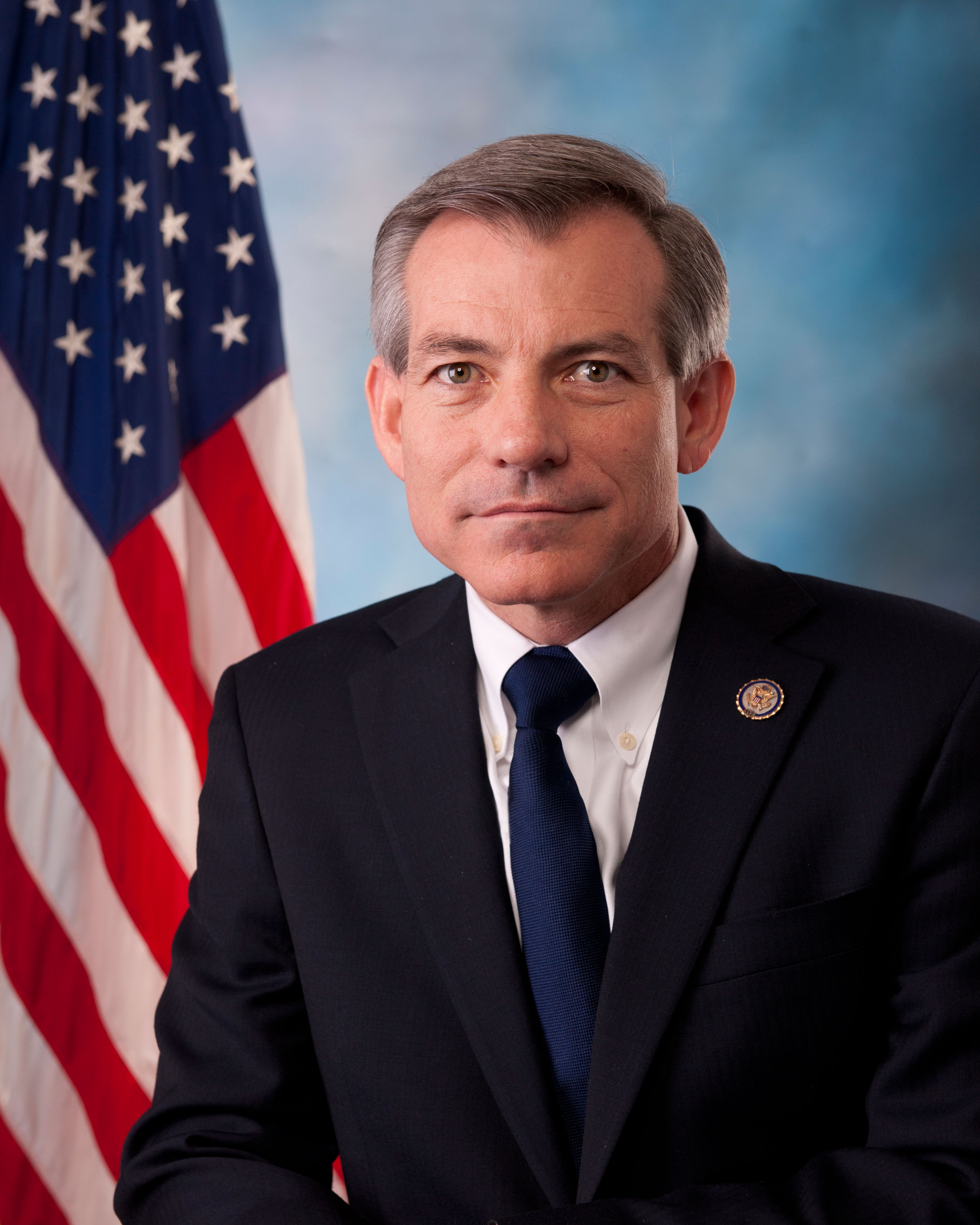
Schweikert's official portrait in 2011

Schweikert sought a rematch with Mitchell in 2010, with Libertarian Nick Coons also running. Schweikert won the Republican primary on August 24 with 37% of the vote. After having sat out the competitive primary, the Club for Growth again endorsed Schweikert.

On November 2, Schweikert defeated Mitchell, 52%–43%.

==== 2012 ====
After redistricting, the bulk of Schweikert's former territory became the 9th district, while his home in Fountain Hills was drawn into the newly created 4th district. But as soon as the maps were released, Schweikert announced he would run in the 6th district. That district had previously been the 3rd, represented by fellow Republican freshman Ben Quayle. In a statement announcing his reelection plans, Schweikert pointed out that he had grown up in Scottsdale—most of which had been drawn into the 6th as well—had represented it in both the state house and in Congress and owned a second home there. A revised map, however, placed Schweikert's Fountain Hills home in the reconfigured 6th.

Quayle, whose home in Phoenix had been drawn into the 9th but was just outside the boundaries of the 6th, also opted to seek reelection in the 6th. During the bitter primary, Schweikert was widely criticized for a mailer that accused Quayle of "going both ways", suggesting that he was bisexual. On the reverse, the mailer listed issues on which it claimed Quayle had taken both liberal and conservative positions. Senator Jon Kyl, who had represented the district from 1987 to 1995, said that "such campaign tactics insult the voters, degrade politics and expose those who stoop to them as unworthy of high office", and Senator John McCain said the mailer was one of the "worst that I have seen" and that it "crosses the boundary of decent political dialogue and discourse." Quayle's spokeswoman called the mailer "utterly false" and "a sleazy smear tactic." Schweikert's spokesman responded that people "should get their minds out of the gutter" because the mailer was "obviously" referring to "'both ways'—as in liberal and conservative." The Arizona Republic asked two political scientists to review the mailer; both said that they had "never seen anybody accuse someone of flip-flopping [on political issues] that way" and said that it was "difficult to believe" that the sexual suggestion was unintentional.

Although the 6th contained almost two-thirds of Quayle's constituents, Schweikert defeated Quayle in the primary–in what was then a heavily Republican district–53% to 47%. He was reelected with 62% of the vote.

==== 2014 ====
Schweikert was easily reelected in 2014, winning over 60% of the vote.

==== 2016 ====
Schweikert was easily reelected in 2016, winning over 60% of the vote.

==== 2018 ====
In 2018, Democratic tech executive Anita Malik held him to only 55% of the vote despite spending very little money. Malik won 44%, the first time a Democrat had crossed the 40% mark in what is now the 6th since 1976, when Eldon Rudd won election by only 707 votes in what was then the 4th District (the district was numbered as the 3rd from 2003 to 2013, and has been the 6th since 2013).

==== 2020 ====
In 2020, Schweikert was challenged by Democrat Hiral Tipirneni, who had run in the neighboring 8th district two years earlier. The Cook Political Report rated the race a tossup, partly due to the district's changing demographics. According to Cook Political Report, the 6th has the most college graduates in Arizona; in recent years, college graduates had trended away from the GOP. Schweikert defeated Tipirneni with 52% of the vote.

==== 2022 ====
In 2022, Schweikert ran for reelection in the newly redrawn 1st district. He defeated Democratic nominee Jevin Hodge in the general election by less than one percent of the vote.

==== 2024 ====
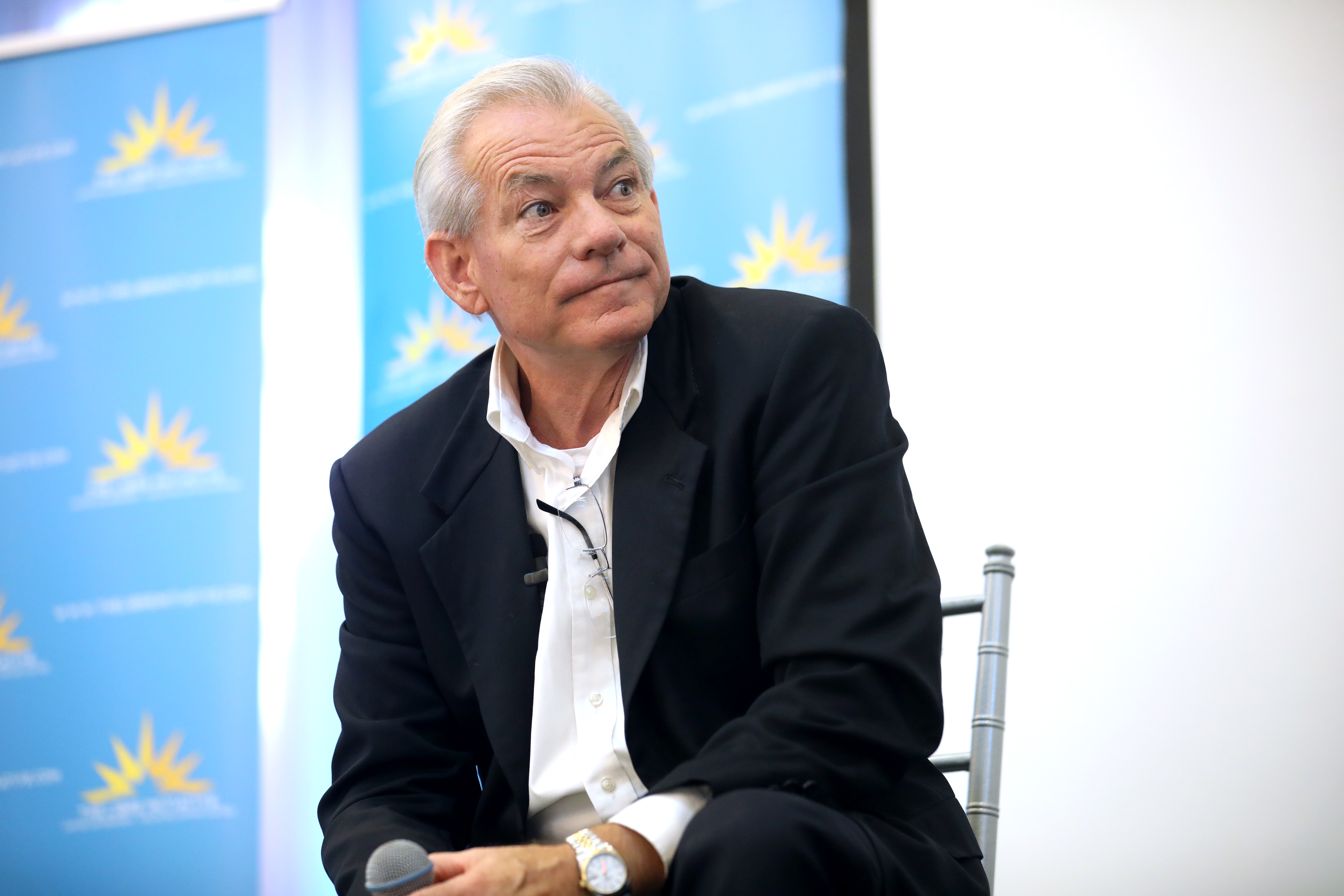
Schweikert in 2024

Schweikert ran for reelection in 2024 against Democratic nominee Amish Shah, an emergency room physician. Schweikert defeated Shah in the November 2024 general election.

Schweikert made the U.S. national debt the centerpiece of his campaign. Schweikert does not endorse spending cuts or tax increases; rather, he proposes "a 'unified theory' of debt reduction that includes a 'radical adoption of technology' such as artificial intelligence, a talent-based immigration system and a comprehensive plan to attack chronic obesity, among other proposals."

=== Tenure ===
==== 116th Congress (2019–2021) ====
Schweikert joined representatives Andy Biggs and Paul Gosar in voting against the Consolidated Appropriations Act, 2021. He called it "one of the more difficult votes I've ever had to make." While the bill included some components he helped write, he voted against it due to the limited time to read it.

In 2018, the United States House Committee on Ethics launched an investigation into Schweikert and his chief of staff, Oliver Schwab, over funds misuse. On July 30, 2020, Schweikert admitted to 11 violation counts and agreed to an official reprimand by the House and a $50,000 fine. The committee found undisclosed loans and campaign contributions; misuse of campaign contributions for personal use; improper spending by his office; and pressuring staffers to do political work. The House Ethics Committee also faulted him for evasive, misleading, and stalling tactics that helped him skirt more serious violations. The report laid out a "surprisingly sizable amount of misconduct over a seven year period." Schweikert said these were inadvertent errors, but the committee reported that "the weight of the evidence" did not support his contention.

==== 117th Congress (2021–2023) ====
On January 6, 2021, Schweikert was at the U.S. Capitol for the 2021 United States Electoral College vote count during the January 6 United States Capitol attack. Schweikert voted to certify Arizona's votes but voted against certifying Pennsylvania's votes. In the wake of the Capitol attack, Schweikert voted against the second impeachment of Donald Trump. In March 2021, he voted against the American Rescue Plan Act of 2021.

Schweikert was a founding member of the Freedom Caucus. He left the group in 2023.

=== Committee assignments ===
For the 118th Congress:

- Committee on Ways and Means
  - Subcommittee on Oversight (Chair)
  - Subcommittee on Social Security
  - Subcommittee on Tax

The House Republican Steering Committee removed Schweikert from the Committee on Financial Services in late 2012 as part of a larger party leadership-caucus shift. He, Justin Amash and Tim Huelskamp wrote to House Speaker John Boehner asking why they had lost their committee posts. Politico quoted a spokesperson for Representative Lynn Westmoreland saying that Schweikert, Amash and Huelskamp were removed for "their inability to work with other members."

=== Caucus memberships ===
- Congressional Taiwan Caucus
- Congressional Western Caucus
- U.S.–Japan Caucus
- Republican Study Committee
- Congressional Coalition on Adoption
- Climate Solutions Caucus

== 2026 Arizona gubernatorial election ==
In September 2025, Schweikert announced that he would not run for re-election to the U.S. House and would instead seek the Republican nomination in the 2026 Arizona gubernatorial election. When announcing his campaign, Schweikert said "I've grown to believe Washington...is unsaveable. I do believe Arizona is savable." Schweikert was defeated in the Republican primary, finishing in second place with 14% of the vote.

== Political positions ==
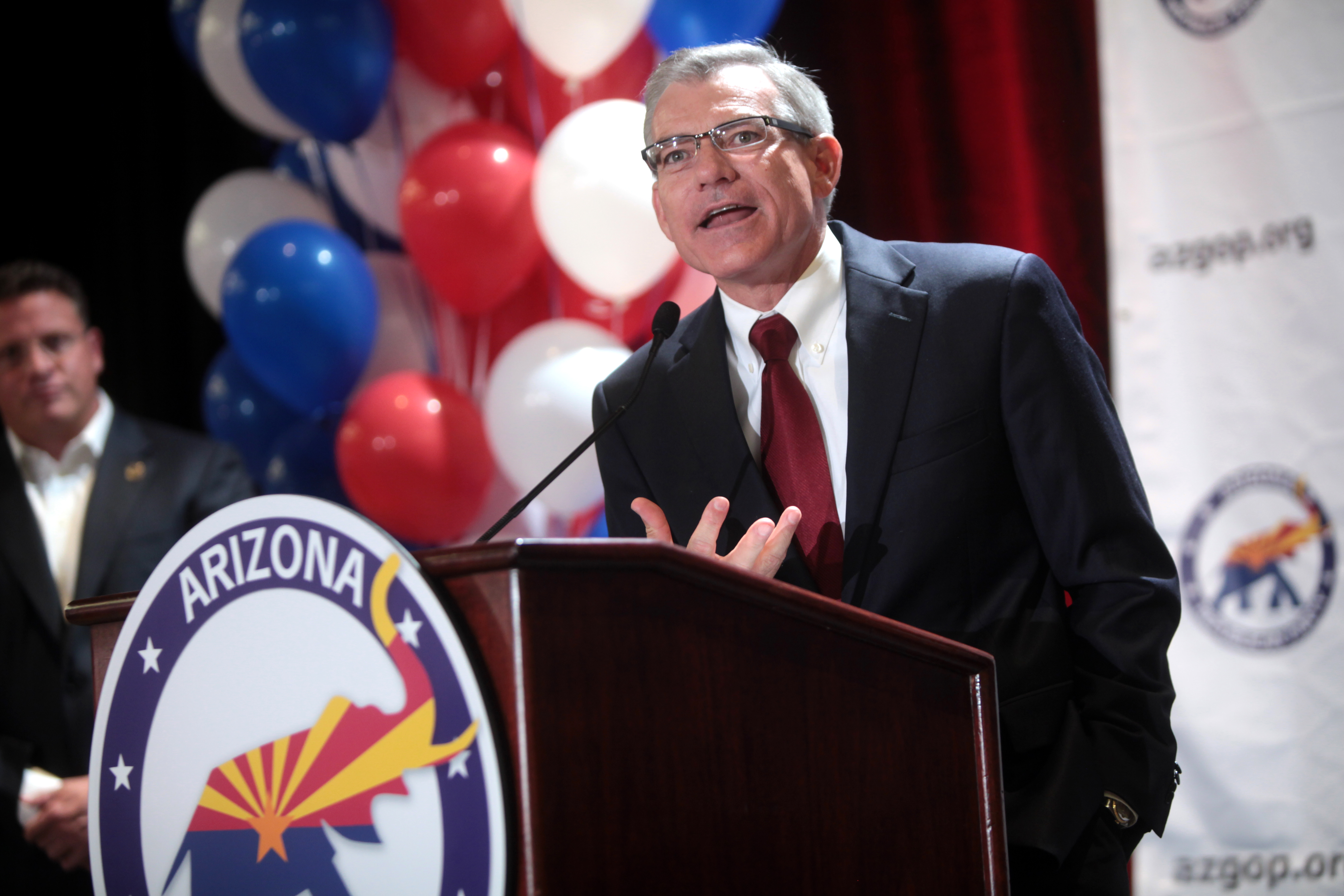
Congressman Schweikert speaking at a rally in August 2014.

=== Abortion ===
Schweikert holds an anti-abortion stance and supported the 2022 decision to overturn Roe v. Wade. However, when the Arizona Supreme Court upheld a near-total abortion ban in April 2024, Schweikert expressed opposition to the ruling.

Schweikert advocates for the Hyde Amendment, which restricts federal funding for abortion services except in cases of rape, incest, or risk to the mother's life, and supports making this restriction permanent. He also opposes funding for Planned Parenthood and has backed legislation to exclude the organization from any federally funded programs.

=== Cannabis ===
Schweikert has a "B" grade from NORML for his voting record on cannabis-related issues. He supports allowing veterans access to medical cannabis, provided it is legal in their state and recommended by their Veterans Health Administration doctor. He has voted twice in favor of this through the Veterans Equal Access Amendment.

=== Foreign policy ===
In 2016, Schweikert opposed President Obama's proposal to close the Guantanamo Bay detention camp. Schweikert was critical of the Iran nuclear deal, calling it "disastrous." In 2015, Schweikert was one of 26 Republicans to vote against a Republican leadership-sponsored defense spending proposal, voicing concerns about increasing defense expenditures without corresponding budget offsets.

In 2021, Schweikert was among 75 House Republicans who voted against the National Defense Authorization Act for Fiscal Year 2022, which would require women to register for the draft.

In 2023, he voted with 47 other Republicans in favor of H.Con.Res. 21, which would have directed President Biden to remove U.S. troops from Syria within 180 days.

=== Gun policy ===
In 2015, he introduced legislation to remove firearm sales and ammunition from the Federal Deposit Insurance Corporation's list of high-risk industries. In 2016, he proposed legislation to remove the District of Columbia's requirement that people seeking concealed carry permits demonstrate a "good reason" to do so.

=== Health care ===
Schweikert has repeatedly voted to repeal the Affordable Care Act (ACA). During Republican efforts to replace and repeal the ACA in 2017, he pushed for proposals to repeal more components of the ACA than other members of his party. He played a key role in whipping votes to repeal the ACA, in particular from fellow members of the Freedom Caucus. He has argued that the Affordable Care Act is "an economy killer" because of "the cost it has on companies, taxpayers and individuals".

=== Economic policy ===
Schweikert has been an outspoken critic of the Dodd–Frank Wall Street Reform and Consumer Protection Act, which overhauled financial regulation in the aftermath of the Great Recession, opposing both the Consumer Financial Protection Bureau and the Volcker Rule.

Schweikert supported legislation to reverse a U.S. Department of Labor rule that established a fiduciary standard for retirement and pension advisers, requiring financial advisers to prioritize their clients' financial interests over their own.

In 2011, Schweikert wrote a letter to President Obama asking him to return royalties from U.S. embassies' purchases of books written by the president.

Schweikert opposed the 2011 United States federal budget, objecting to appropriations to expand the Smithsonian Institution, conduct research, and build high-speed rail.

In 2015, Schweikert was one of 17 Republicans to oppose the 2015 United States federal budget, arguing that it did not sufficiently address mandatory spending on entitlement programs. He has called for cutting spending on Medicare and Social Security, arguing that "hard choices" must be made.

Schweikert voted for the Tax Cuts and Jobs Act of 2017.

=== Iraq ===
In June 2021, Schweikert was one of 49 House Republicans to vote to repeal the 2002 AUMF Against Iraq.

=== Antitrust bill ===
In 2022, Schweikert joined 39 other Republicans in supporting the Merger Filing Fee Modernization Act of 2022, a bipartisan antitrust measure designed to address anti-competitive corporate behavior.

== Personal life ==
Schweikert and his wife, Joyce, live in Fountain Hills, Arizona. They adopted a daughter in 2015 and a son in 2022. Schweikert is Catholic.

== Electoral history ==
=== 1990 ===
1990 Arizona House of Representatives 28th district election
Party	Candidate	Votes	%
Republican	Lisa Graham	40,925	44.40
Republican	David Schweikert	31,175	33.82
Democratic	Bill Searle	20,051	21.75
Write-in (R)	Bonnie Francis	30	0.03
Total votes		92,181	100.0

=== 1992 ===
1992 Arizona House of Representatives 28th district election
Party	Candidate	Votes	%
Republican	Lisa Graham (incumbent)	47,396	59.06
Republican	David Schweikert (incumbent)	32,852	40.94
Total votes		80,248	100.0
Republican hold			
Republican hold			

=== 1994 ===
1994 Arizona's 6th congressional district Republican primary
Party	Candidate	Votes	%
Republican	J. D. Hayworth	21,109	45.26
Republican	David Schweikert	9,565	20.51
Republican	Gary Husk	6,500	13.94
Republican	David Smith	5,093	10.92
Republican	Ramona Liston	4,376	9.38
Total votes		46,643	100

=== 2008 ===
2008 Arizona's 5th congressional district Republican primary
Party	Candidate	Votes	%
Republican	David Schweikert	14,233	29.50
Republican	Susan Bitter Smith	13,212	27.38
Republican	Laura Knaperek	7,523	15.59
Republican	Mark Anderson	6,539	13.55
Republican	Jim Ogsbury	6,042	12.52
Republican	Lee Gentry	706	1.46
Total votes		48,262	100

2008 Arizona's 5th congressional district election
Party	Candidate	Votes	%
Democratic	Harry Mitchell (incumbent)	149,033	53.16
Republican	David Schweikert	122,165	43.57
Libertarian	Warren Severin	9,158	3.27
Write-in	Ralph Hughes	9	0.00
Total votes		280,365	100
Democratic hold			

=== 2010 ===
2010 Arizona's 5th congressional district Republican primary
Party	Candidate	Votes	%
Republican	David Schweikert	26,678	37.23
Republican	Jim Ward	18,480	25.79
Republican	Susan Bitter Smith	17,297	24.14
Republican	Chris Salvino	7,156	9.99
Republican	Lee Gentry	1,157	1.61
Republican	Mark Spinks	884	1.23
Total votes		71,652	100

2010 Arizona's 5th congressional district election
Party	Candidate	Votes	%
Republican	David Schweikert	110,374	52.0
Democratic	Harry Mitchell (incumbent)	91,749	43.2
Libertarian	Nick Coons	10,127	4.8
Total votes		212,250	100
Republican gain from Democratic			

=== 2012 ===
2012 Arizona's 6th congressional district Republican primary
Party	Candidate	Votes	%
Republican	David Schweikert (incumbent)	41,821	51.48
Republican	Ben Quayle (incumbent)	39,414	48.52
Total votes		81,235	100

2012 Arizona's 6th congressional district election
Party	Candidate	Votes	%
Republican	David Schweikert (incumbent)	179,706	61.30
Democratic	Matt Jette	97,666	33.31
Libertarian	Jack Anderson	10,167	3.47
Green	Mark Salazar	5,637	1.91
Write-in	James Ketover	1	0.00
Total votes		233,175	100
Republican hold			

=== 2014 ===
2014 Arizona's 6th congressional district Republican primary
Party	Candidate	Votes	%
Republican	David Schweikert (incumbent)	129,578	64.86
Republican	Russ Wittenberg	15,535	19.7
Total votes		145,113	100

2014 Arizona's 6th congressional district election
Party	Candidate	Votes	%
Republican	David Schweikert (incumbent)	129,578	64.86
Democratic	John Williamson	70,198	35.14
Total votes		199,776	100
Republican hold			

=== 2016 ===
2016 Arizona's 6th congressional district Republican primary
Party	Candidate	Votes	%
Republican	David Schweikert (incumbent)	63,378	80.3
Republican	Russ Wittenburg	15,535	19.7
Total votes		78,913	100

2016 Arizona's 6th congressional district election
Party	Candidate	Votes	%
Republican	David Schweikert (incumbent)	201,578	62.1
Democratic	John Williamson	122,866	37.9
Total votes		324,444	100
Republican hold			

=== 2018 ===
2018 Arizona's 6th congressional district Republican primary
Party	Candidate	Votes	%
Republican	David Schweikert (incumbent)	83,406	100
Total votes		83,406	100

2018 Arizona's 6th congressional district election
Party	Candidate	Votes	%
Republican	David Schweikert (incumbent)	173,140	55.2
Democratic	Anita Malik	140,559	44.8
Total votes		313,699	100
Republican hold			

=== 2020 ===
2020 Arizona's 6th congressional district election
Party	Candidate	Votes	%
Republican	David Schweikert (incumbent)	217,783	52.2
Democratic	Hiral Tipirneni	199,644	47.8
Total votes		417,427	100
Republican hold			

=== 2022 ===
2022 Arizona's 1st congressional district election
Party	Candidate	Votes	%
Republican	David Schweikert (incumbent)	182,336	50.4
Democratic	Jevin Hodge	179,141	49.6
Total votes		361,477	100
Republican hold			

=== 2024 ===
2024 Arizona's 1st congressional district Republican primary
Party	Candidate	Votes	%
Republican	David Schweikert (incumbent)	62,811	62.7
Republican	Kim George	27,587	27.5
Republican	Robert Backie	9,854	9.78
Total votes		100,252	100

2024 Arizona's 1st congressional district election
Party	Candidate	Votes	%
Republican	David Schweikert (incumbent)	225,538	51.9%
Democratic	Amish Shah	208,966	48.1%
Total votes		434,504	100.00%
Republican hold			

== See also ==
- List of United States representatives expelled, censured, or reprimanded

U.S. House of Representatives
Preceded by Harry Mitchell	Member of the U.S. House of Representatives from Arizona's 5th congressional district 2011–2013	Succeeded by Matt Salmon
Preceded by Jeff Flake	Member of the U.S. House of Representatives from Arizona's 6th congressional district 2013–2023	Succeeded by Juan Ciscomani
Preceded by Tom O'Halleran	Member of the U.S. House of Representatives from Arizona's 1st congressional district 2023–present	Incumbent
Preceded by Martin Heinrich	Chair of the Joint Economic Committee; 2025–present	Incumbent
U.S. order of precedence (ceremonial)
Preceded by Mike Kelly	United States representatives by seniority 87th	Succeeded by Austin Scott
