= Fountain Hills High School =

Coordinates: 33.6156°N 111.7357°W

Location
- 16100 E. Palisades Blvd. Fountain Hills, Arizona 85268; United States

Information
- School type: Public high school
- Motto: Campus of Champions
- Established: 1991
- School district: Fountain Hills Unified School District
- Principal: Chris Hartmann
- Grades: 9-12
- Enrollment: 404 (2023-2024)
- Colors: Royal blue and silver
- Mascot: Falcons
- Information: (480) 664-5500
- Website: www.fhschools.org/fhhs

Fountain Hills High School is a public high school in Fountain Hills, Arizona under the jurisdiction of the Fountain Hills Unified School District.

Fountain Hills High School was constructed from 1991 to 1993, and its first graduating class was in 1994. It is located next to the Golden Eagle Park, south of the Ashbrook Wash. Fountain Hills High School has numerous extracurricular programs, including a band and championship-winning athletic teams. Clubs include robotics, Key Club, National Honor Society, student government, jazz band, and astronomy. The school offers a wide variety of AP & honors classes, an Advancement Via Individual Determination (AVID) program, and an elaborate art department. The school has seen a gradual increase in students from the city of Scottsdale due to the small size of the school when compared to surrounding schools.

The Fountain Hills High School marching band won 1st place in 2018 at the ABODA (Arizona Band and Orchestra Directors Association) Super State Finals competition at Arizona State University's Sun Devil Stadium in Tempe, Arizona.

The Fountain Hills High School symphonic band performs locally at the Fountain Hills Community Center semiannually at the end of the second and fourth academic quarters. All members of the marching band automatically convert into symphonic band students at the conclusion of the marching band season. The symphonic band competes alongside the jazz band during the annual band & choir California spring trip.

The Fountain Hills High School falcon jazz band is classified as a school club, and meets biweekly for rehearsals. The jazz band competes alongside the symphonic band during the annual band & choir California spring trip.
