= William W. Mitchell Sr. =

American politician and businessman (1880–1969)

Honorable William Wesley Mitchell Sr.

Arizona State House of Representative

Member of the Arizona House of Representatives
- In office 1937–1958

Personal details
- Born: October 10, 1880 Vienna, Illinois
- Died: April 30, 1969 (aged 88) Tempe, Arizona
- Resting place: City of Mesa Cemetery, Mesa, Maricopa County, Arizona
- Party: Democratic Party
- Relations: Harry Mitchell (grandson)
- Profession: newspaper publisher, land developer

William Wesley Mitchell Sr. (October 10, 1880 – April 30, 1969) was an American politician and businessman.

Born in Vienna, Illinois, Mitchell moved to Arizona Territory in 1910. He was publisher of the Mesa Free Press and was in the land development business. He served in the Arizona House of Representatives from 1937 to 1958, representing the Maricopa=11 (Phoenix) district and Maricopa-05 (Tempe) district. He died in Tempe, Arizona. His grandson was the former U.S. representative Harry Mitchell.
