= Jim Kolbe =

American politician (1942–2022)

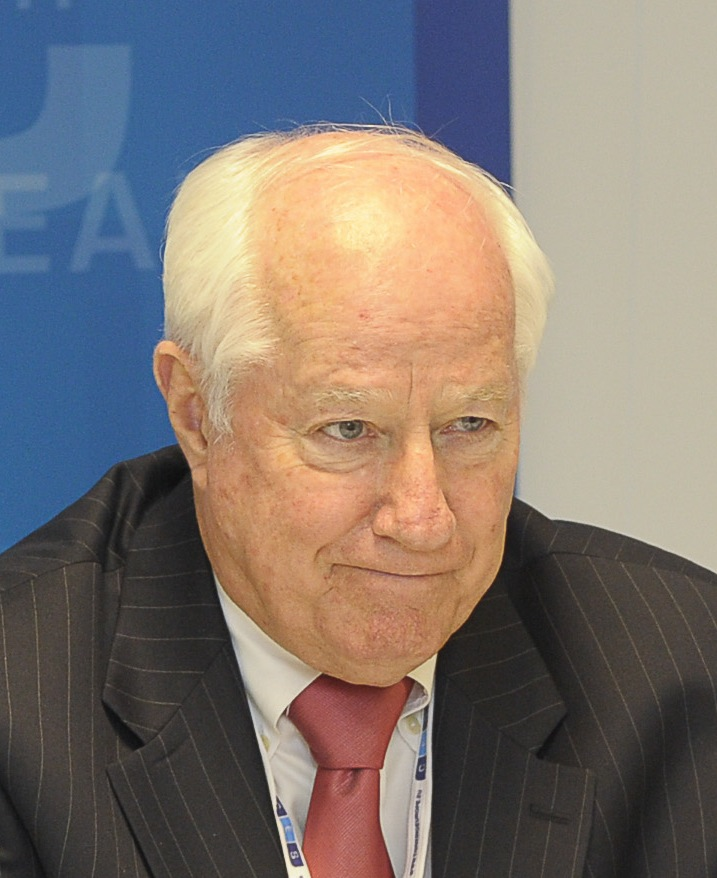
- Kolbe in 2010

Member of the U.S. House of Representatives from Arizona
- In office January 3, 1985 – January 3, 2007
- Preceded by: James F. McNulty Jr.
- Succeeded by: Gabby Giffords
- Constituency: 5th district (1985–2003); 8th district (2003–2007)

Member of the Arizona Senate from the 14th district
- In office January 3, 1977 – December 31, 1982
- Preceded by: Lucy Davidson
- Succeeded by: William De Long

Personal details
- Born: James Thomas Kolbe; June 28, 1942 Evanston, Illinois, U.S.
- Died: December 3, 2022 (aged 80)
- Party: Republican (before 2018); Independent (2018–2022)
- Spouses: Sarah Dinham (m. 1977; div. 1992); Hector Alfonso (m. 2013)
- Education: Northwestern University (BA); Stanford University (MBA)

Military service
- Branch/service: United States Navy
- Years of service: 1967–1969 (active); 1970–1977 (reserve)

James Thomas Kolbe (June 28, 1942 – December 3, 2022) was an American politician who served as a Republican member of the United States House of Representatives. He represented Arizona's 5th congressional district from 1985 to 2003 and its 8th congressional district from 2003 to 2007. A moderate, pro–abortion rights Republican, he came out as gay in 1996 after voting in support of the Defense of Marriage Act; his subsequent re-elections made him the second openly gay Republican elected to Congress.

After leaving Congress, Kolbe served on the Advisory Committee for Trade Policy and Negotiations under Democratic president Barack Obama. Kolbe left the Republican Party and became an independent in 2018 after the election of Donald Trump. He endorsed Joe Biden in the 2020 presidential election.

== Early life ==
Kolbe was born in Evanston, Illinois, a suburb of Chicago, on June 28, 1942, the son of Helen Nevada (Reed) and Walter William Kolbe. When he was five, his family moved to a ranch in rural Santa Cruz County, Arizona. He attended Patagonia Elementary School and Patagonia Union High School, but graduated from the United States Capitol Page School in 1960 after serving for three years as a United States Senate Page for Barry Goldwater. In 1965, he received his bachelor's degree in political science from Northwestern University in Evanston, where he was a member of Acacia fraternity, and, in 1967, his master's in business administration from Stanford University in Palo Alto, California. He served in the United States Navy, including a year in Vietnam in the riverine, "Swift Boat," force. He was a special assistant to Illinois Republican Governor Richard B. Ogilvie. He then moved to Tucson, Arizona, where he was a business executive.

== Arizona Senate ==
In 1976, Kolbe ran for the Arizona Senate in a Tucson-area district and defeated Lucy Davidson, a one-term Democrat who had been elected in the national Democratic wave of 1974. He served three terms in that body, and was majority whip from 1979 to 1982.

== U.S. House of Representatives ==
In 1982, Kolbe ran for the United States House of Representatives in the newly created 5th congressional district. He lost to Democrat Jim McNulty, a member of the Arizona Board of Regents, by one percent. However, Kolbe sought a rematch in 1984. Buoyed by Ronald Reagan's massive national landslide that year (Reagan carried the 5th with 60 percent of the vote), Kolbe won, becoming the first—and until the 2014 elections, only—Republican to represent the Arizona-Mexico border region in the House. He was reelected 10 times, often facing only token opposition. In 1998, former Tucson mayor Tom Volgy challenged Kolbe, holding Kolbe to only 51 percent of the vote.

Kolbe was a moderate Republican. This served him well; although his district included most of Tucson's Republican-leaning suburbs, the brand of Republican politics practiced in Southeast Arizona has traditionally been a centrist and independently-minded one. Like his mentor, Goldwater, Kolbe supported abortion rights. He was generally more supportive of environmental legislation than most Republicans, especially those from the West. He was a member of various moderate Republican groups such as the Log Cabin Republicans, the Republican Main Street Partnership, the Republican Majority For Choice, Republicans for Choice, Republicans For Environmental Protection, and It's My Party Too. He was one of the four Republicans who voted against the Partial-Birth Abortion Ban Act which was passed by the House of Representatives with 281–142 votes on October 2, 2003.

Kolbe voted against the Abandoned Shipwrecks Act of 1987. The Act asserts United States title to certain abandoned shipwrecks located on or embedded in submerged lands under state jurisdiction, and transfers title to the respective state, thereby empowering states to manage these cultural and historical resources more efficiently, with the goal of preventing treasure hunters and salvagers from damaging them. Despite his vote against it, President Ronald Reagan signed it into law on April 28, 1988.

In 2001, Kolbe introduced the Legal Tender Modernization Act which would have ceased production of the U.S. one-cent piece (penny). In July 2006, Kolbe introduced the Currency Overhaul for an Industrious Nation (COIN) Act, which would round cash transactions to the nearest five cents. This act would effectively remove the penny from circulation. Kolbe argued that, because of inflation, the penny is virtually worthless, and that the U.S. should stop using the penny now that the costs of penny production exceed its value. Kolbe had received some media attention as one of the foremost promoters of eliminating the penny from circulation.

In 2004, State House Majority Whip Randy Graf challenged Kolbe for the Republican nomination. It was the first substantive primary challenge Kolbe had faced since his initial run for the seat in 1982. Graf ran well to Kolbe's right, but was best known for his hardline approach to illegal immigration. In contrast, Kolbe was a strong supporter of guest worker programs for immigrants. Kolbe defeated Graf. He easily won an 11th term in November. Also in 2004, Kolbe was among the 27 Republicans who voted against the Federal Marriage Amendment, a constitutional amendment intended to ban gay marriage. He voted against banning gay marriage again in 2006.

On November 23, 2005, Kolbe announced that he would not seek a 12th term in 2006. While Kolbe had usually coasted to reelection, it had been expected to be very competitive if he ever retired. (Bill Clinton had narrowly won the district in 1996, and George W. Bush narrowly edged out Al Gore and John Kerry in both of his presidential bids.) Graf won the five-candidate primary on September 12, 2006. Kolbe refused to endorse Graf, who lost to Democrat Gabby Giffords in the November 2006 election.

Kolbe endorsed State Senate President Tim Bee's bid to unseat Giffords in 2008. However, he withdrew his endorsement in July 2008.

=== Mark Foley scandal ===
In 2000, when Kolbe found out about former Congressman Mark Foley's "Internet communications with teenagers" who were subordinate to Foley, he informed the office that oversaw the page program. He assumed the matter had been taken care of, although this was not brought to the public's attention until September 29, 2006, when it became public that Foley had sent sexually explicit and solicitative e-mails and instant messages to young adult male pages. Republican leaders had claimed that they had only recently been made aware of Foley's actions, despite Kolbe's actions. In January 2007, the Federal Election Commission committee ruled that Kolbe could use campaign funds for legal expenses associated with the Foley scandal. Former Senator Larry Craig cited this ruling in 2012 in defense against a lawsuit by the FEC regarding Craig's use of campaign funds in his own legal defense.

In October 2006, federal prosecutors in Arizona opened a preliminary investigation into a camping trip that Kolbe took in July 1996 that included two teenage former congressional pages, as well as National Park officials, then-current staff, and Kolbe's sister. During that trip to the Grand Canyon, he was accused of "acting inappropriately"; NBC News interviewed several people who were on the trip, and their accounts vary. On June 5, 2007, federal investigators absolved Kolbe of any wrongdoing in the case. In a statement released by the Justice Department, "investigators have completed their work on the preliminary inquiry opened by federal prosecutors last fall, and see no reason to pursue it further."

== After Congress ==
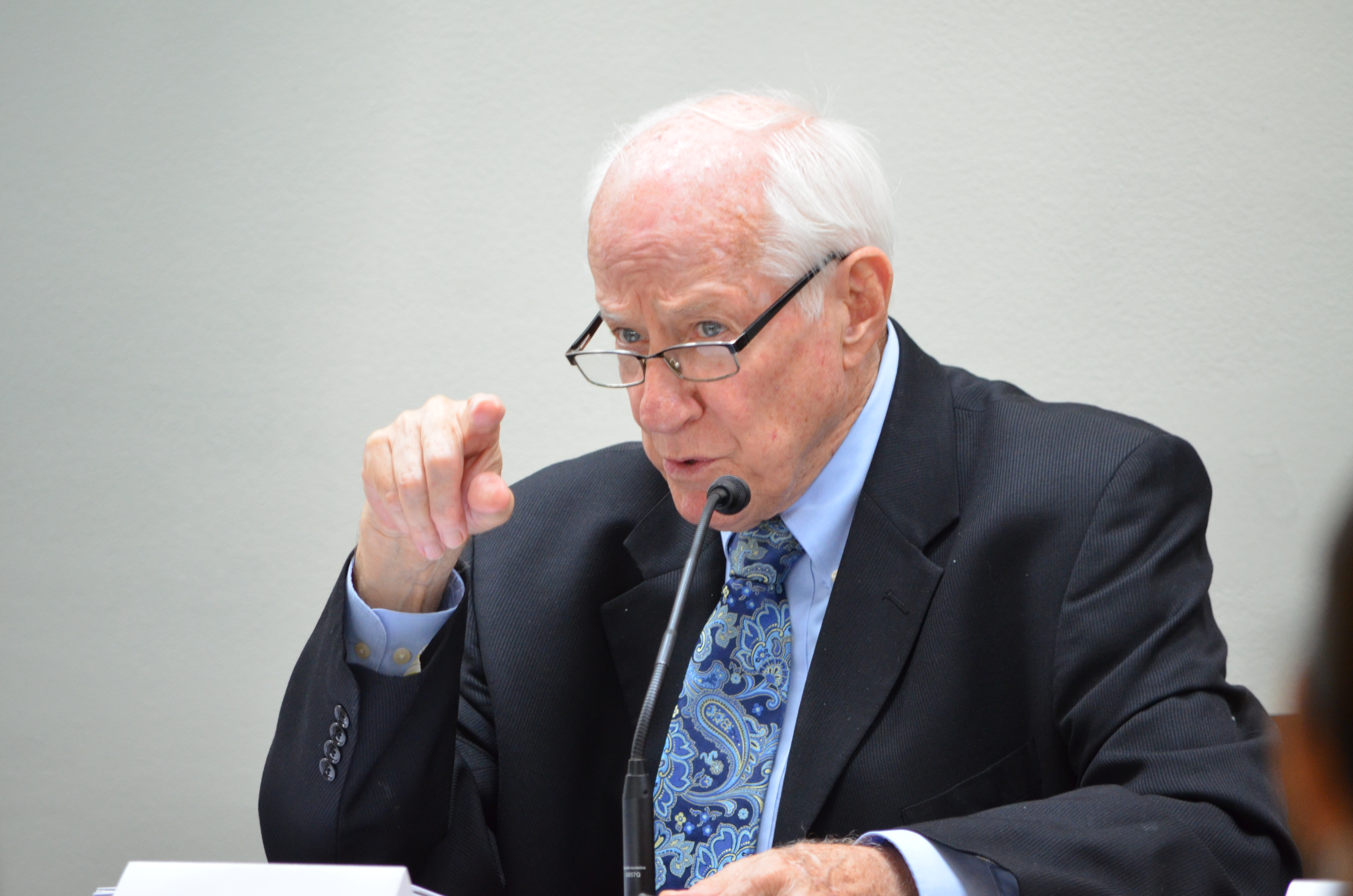
Kolbe in 2017

Following his career in elected office, Kolbe became a fellow at the German Marshall Fund think tank and a consultant at Kissinger McLarty Associates. He focused on issues that were his priorities while he was in Congress—trade, aid, and migration. During the fall semesters from 2007 to 2009, he taught a class on trade and globalization at the University of Arizona James E. Rogers College of Law in Tucson. He was a member of the board of directors of the International Republican Institute. During the 2010 election he broke from the Republican Party to endorse the candidacy of Democrat Andrei Cherny for state treasurer. He was also a member of Washington D.C. based think tank the Inter-American Dialogue.

In September 2010, President Barack Obama appointed Kolbe to the Advisory Committee for Trade Policy and Negotiations. Kolbe served on the Board of Advisors for International Relief and Development Inc. He was also a Co-Chairman of the dollar coin alliance. Kolbe served on the board of directors of the Committee for a Responsible Federal Budget.

In 2018, Kolbe left the Republican Party. He endorsed Democrat Joe Biden for president in the 2020 presidential election.

In 2020, Kolbe, along with over 130 other former Republican national security officials, signed a statement that asserted that President Trump was unfit to serve another term, and "To that end, we are firmly convinced that it is in the best interest of our nation that Vice President Joe Biden be elected as the next President of the United States, and we will vote for him."

Kolbe sat on the Executive Advisory Board for autonomous trucking company TuSimple. He joined nine other former members of Congress to co-author a 2021 opinion editorial advocating reforms of Congress.

== Personal life ==
Kolbe was married to Sarah Dinham, a professor of educational psychology at the University of Arizona, from 1977 to 1992. He was a member of Catalina United Methodist Church.

Kolbe came out as gay in August 1996 after his vote in favor of the Defense of Marriage Act spurred efforts by some gay rights activists to out him. He won re-election that year. In 2000, he became the first openly gay person to address the Republican National Convention, although his speech did not address gay rights. He was the second openly gay Republican to serve in Congress, the first being Steve Gunderson of Wisconsin.

In 2013, Kolbe married his partner, Hector Alfonso. That year, Kolbe was a signatory to an amicus curiae brief submitted to the U.S. Supreme Court in support of same-sex marriage during the Hollingsworth v. Perry case.

On December 3, 2022, Kolbe died from a stroke at age 80. Arizona Governor Doug Ducey ordered flags in the state to be lowered until the evening of December 4 in honor of Kolbe.

== See also ==
- List of LGBT members of the United States Congress

U.S. House of Representatives
Preceded by James F. McNulty Jr.	Member of the U.S. House of Representatives from Arizona's 5th congressional district 1985–2003	Succeeded by J. D. Hayworth
New constituency	Member of the U.S. House of Representatives from Arizona's 8th congressional district 2003–2007	Succeeded by Gabby Giffords
