= Fountain Hills Unified School District =

School district in Arizona, United States

Address
- 16000 E. Palisades Blvd Fountain Hills, Arizona, 85268; United States

District information
- Grades: K–12
- Superintendent: Tom Lawrence
- Enrollment: 2,334

Other information
- Telephone: (480) 664-5000
- Fax: (480) 664-5099
- Website: fountainhillsschools.org

The Fountain Hills Unified School District is a public school district in Maricopa County, Arizona, US, based in Fountain Hills, Arizona. It serves Fountain Hills, the Fort McDowell Yavapai Nation, and parts of Scottsdale.

== Schools ==
The Fountain Hills Unified School District has one elementary school, one middle school, and one high school.

=== Elementary school ===
- McDowell Mountain Elementary School

=== Middle school ===
- Fountain Hills Middle School

=== High school ===
- Fountain Hills High School
