= J. D. Hayworth =

American television host and politician (born 1958)

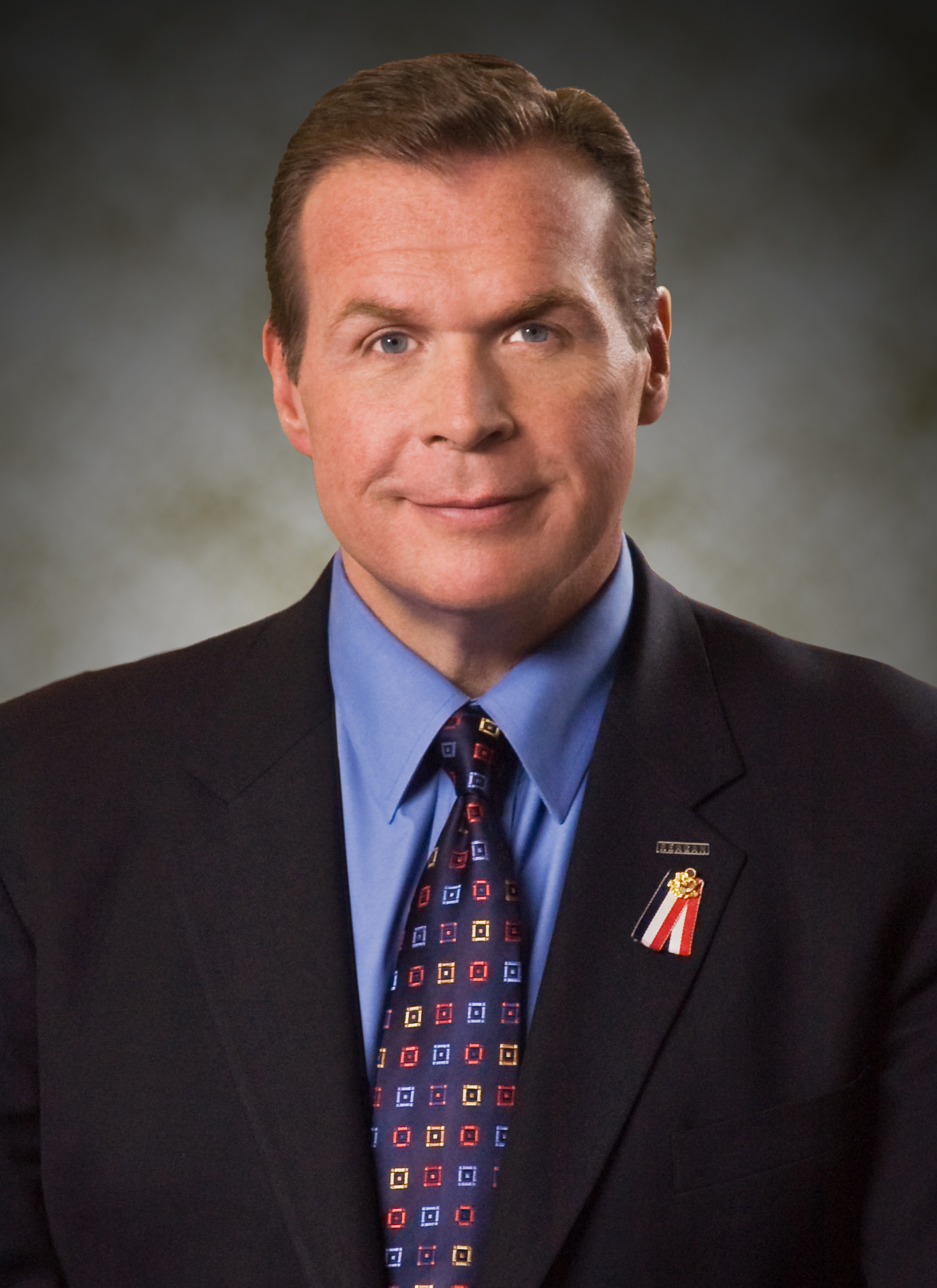
- Hayworth in 2010

Member of the U.S. House of Representatives from Arizona
- In office January 3, 1995 – January 3, 2007
- Preceded by: Karan English
- Succeeded by: Harry Mitchell
- Constituency: 6th district (1995–2003); 5th district (2003–2007)

Personal details
- Born: John David Hayworth Jr. July 12, 1958 (age 68) High Point, North Carolina, U.S.
- Party: Republican
- Spouse: Mary Hayworth (m. 1989)
- Education: North Carolina State University (BA)

John David Hayworth Jr. (born July 12, 1958) is an American television host and former politician. He served as a Republican member of the United States House of Representatives from 1995 to 2007 from Arizona's 5th Congressional District. He later hosted Newsmax Prime, a television news/talk prime time show that aired weekdays at 8:00 p.m. Eastern Time and 5:00 p.m. Pacific Time on Newsmax TV. Previously, he hosted a conservative talk radio program on KFYI in Phoenix until January 2010, when he resigned due to his run for the U.S. Senate.

A graduate of North Carolina State University, Hayworth anchored sports reports for three television stations during the 1980s and early 1990s. In 1994, Hayworth was elected to represent Arizona's 6th congressional district, which was redistricted into the 5th District starting in the 2002 House elections. He was defeated in 2006 by Democratic candidate Harry Mitchell.

In 2010, he unsuccessfully ran for the U.S. Senate, losing to incumbent Senator John McCain in the Republican primary.

== Early life and education ==
Hayworth was born in High Point, North Carolina. His grandfather, Ray Hayworth, was a Major League Baseball catcher from 1926 to 1945. Hayworth received a bachelor's degree in speech communications and political science from North Carolina State University in Raleigh in 1980, where he was student body president during his senior year.

== Early broadcast career ==
Hayworth appeared as a sportscaster for WPTF-TV in Raleigh/Durham, NC, WFBC-TV (now WYFF-TV), the NBC station in Greenville, South Carolina, from 1981 to 1986, and WLWT-TV in Cincinnati, Ohio from 1986 to 1987. From 1987 to 1994, he was the sports anchor on the news reports of KTSP-TV (later KSAZ-TV), which was then the CBS affiliate in Phoenix.

== U.S. House of Representatives ==
=== Committees ===
As a congressman, Hayworth served on the House of Representatives Committee on Ways and Means. He was the first ever representative from Arizona to have served on the committee. While working on the committee, he was given a "satisfactory" (64 percent) rating from the National Taxpayers Union. Hayworth supported the tax cuts of 2001 and 2003, signed into law by President George W. Bush.

=== Campaigns ===
In 1994, Hayworth ran in what was then the 6th District and defeated incumbent Democrat Karan English, taking 54 percent of the vote to English's 42 percent. Hayworth criticized English's support for Bill Clinton's budget plan, which Hayworth termed the largest tax increase in history. English had been endorsed in her successful 1992 campaign by former state U.S. Senator and 1964 Republican presidential candidate Barry Goldwater when she ran against Doug Wead, but not in 1994 when she ran against Hayworth.

In 1996, Hayworth fired two of his campaign aides for their part in forging his signature to file a campaign affidavit on time. He won in 1996 with 48 percent of the vote, defeating Democrat Steve Owens.

In 1998, Hayworth signed and filed the form in person, with television cameras, campaign volunteers, and the Arizona Secretary of State watching. He again defeated Owens, 52 percent to 45 percent.

His next three elections he won handily: He won in 2000 against Larry K. Nelson, 60 percent to 37 percent; in 2002 against Craig Columbus, getting 61 percent of the vote; and in 2004 against Elizabeth Rogers, getting 60 percent.

During his first four terms, Hayworth represented a district that took in most of the northeastern portion of the state, including Flagstaff. Most of its population, however, was located in the Phoenix suburbs. After the 2000 census, his district was renumbered the 5th District and was made a much more compact district centered on the northeastern Valley—including all of Tempe, Scottsdale and Fountain Hills, western Mesa, and Chandler, and part of northeastern Phoenix. Despite a modest Republican registration advantage, it was considered to be slightly less conservative than other suburban Phoenix districts.

=== Media profile ===
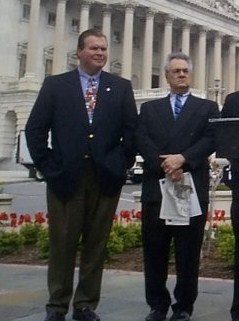
Hayworth and Barney Frank at a Capitol Hill press conference.

Known for his outspoken nature—he called President Clinton an "unprincipled philandering president" who had "the most corrupt administration in U.S. history" – Hayworth is a frequent guest on conservative TV and talk radio. He sometimes substitutes as host of the nationally syndicated Laura Ingraham political commentary show on the Talk Radio Network.

Hayworth has never shied away from controversy. In the same campaign letter in which he criticized Clinton, he said his Democratic opponent was "bankrolled by trial lawyers, radical homosexual rights groups, environmental extremists ... along with almost every other left-wing wacko group you can think of."

=== Political positions ===
Hayworth is a staunch conservative. He supports stronger border security and opposes the temporary worker program proposed by President George W. Bush for illegal aliens.

In January 2006, Regnery published Whatever It Takes: Illegal Immigration, Border Security, and the War on Terror, a book by Hayworth and his chief of staff, Joseph J. Eule. In the book, Hayworth said that Bush is too close to GOP contributors from the agribusiness, meat packing and construction industries, whom he calls "addicted" to a steady stream of workers from Mexico and Central America to keep wages down. Hayworth also argues that current immigration law misinterprets the 14th Amendment to the Constitution, saying that a child of undocumented immigrants born in the U.S. should not be given U.S. citizenship (a view he has reiterated during the 2010 campaign), and advocates the "Americanization" program Henry Ford advocated in an interview with the New York Times in 1914.

The ever-so-successful process that used to be called "Americanization" was a major movement in the early 1900s ... Henry Ford, a leader in this movement, said, "These men of many nations must be taught American ways, the English language, and the right way to live." Talk like that today and our liberal elites will brand you a cultural imperialist, or worse. But if you ask me, Ford had a better idea.

Hayworth is the chairman of the advisory committee of the United States Justice Foundation.

== 2006 congressional campaign ==
Hayworth had considered running for Governor of Arizona in the 2006 elections against incumbent Democrat Janet Napolitano, but in March 2005 he announced that he preferred to stay in Congress. In the spring of 2005, Napolitano was enjoying a 79 percent favorable job rating.

In the 2006 election, Hayworth faced former Tempe mayor, state senator, and then-state Democratic Party chairman Harry Mitchell. A number of prominent Republicans endorsed Mitchell, and this defection appeared to have influenced the general election. CD-5, despite having a 60% Republican active registered voter advantage over Democrats (139,057 vs 86,743 in October 2006), nevertheless saw Hayworth narrowly defeated by Mitchell. While most media outlets called the race for Mitchell on election night, Hayworth refused to concede due to a large number of absentee and early-voting ballots. However, when it became apparent that Mitchell's lead was too large to overcome, Hayworth conceded on November 14. He ultimately lost by 8,000 votes.

== Further broadcast career ==
On April 23, 2007, it was announced on Phoenix radio station KFYI that Hayworth would begin hosting an afternoon drive time (4–7 p.m.) talk show on the station starting April 26, 2007. Hayworth left his position as a political talk show host following his January 22, 2010 broadcast. At the time of his resignation he made the decision to challenge John McCain in the 2010 Republican primary election for U.S. Senate.

On January 3, 2012, Hayworth began a stint hosting a morning show on KSFO in San Francisco, California.

That April, former presidential candidate and former Governor of Arkansas Mike Huckabee replaced Hayworth on KSFO. Hayworth was a sometime fill-in when Huckabee is away from his radio show.

On March 8, 2013, it was announced that Hayworth would become the new co-host for the morning talk show on XEPRS-AM 1090 in Tijuana/San Diego. He joined Lee Hamilton. On August 30, 2013, he left XEPRS 1090.

== 2010 Senate campaign ==
In November 2009, Rasmussen Reports released the results of a poll of likely 2010 Republican primary voters in Arizona showing a statistical tie in a hypothetical primary challenge to incumbent John McCain for the 2010 Republican U.S. Senate nomination in Arizona. Hayworth said he was considering running against McCain because he has "a profound disagreement with Senator John McCain over the concept of amnesty, whether he wants to call it comprehensive immigration reform or a pathway for guest workers to remain."

In February, 2010, Hayworth announced that he was indeed running against McCain. By mid March, Rasmussen reported only 7 points separating the two. Some credit was given to other McCain challengers' dropping out, thereby allowing Hayworth to pick up their support.

During the campaign, Hayworth garnered controversy for erroneously stating that the United States never declared war on Germany during the Second World War. It was also discovered that he had participated in an infomercial in which he encouraged persons to obtain “free money” from the United States government, through a program widely criticized as a scam.

On August 25, 2010, Hayworth was defeated by John McCain 57–32% in the Arizona Senate primary.

== Personal life ==
Hayworth married in 1989. He and his wife Mary have three children.

U.S. House of Representatives
Preceded by Karan English	Member of the U.S. House of Representatives from Arizona's 6th congressional district 1995–2003	Succeeded by Jeff Flake
Preceded by Jim Kolbe	Member of the U.S. House of Representatives from Arizona's 5th congressional district 2003–2007	Succeeded by Harry Mitchell
U.S. order of precedence (ceremonial)
Preceded by Derek Kilmer as Former U.S. Representative	Order of precedence of the United States as Former U.S. Representative	Succeeded by Edward G. Biester Jr. as Former U.S. Representative
