= Harry Mitchell =

American politician (1940–2026)

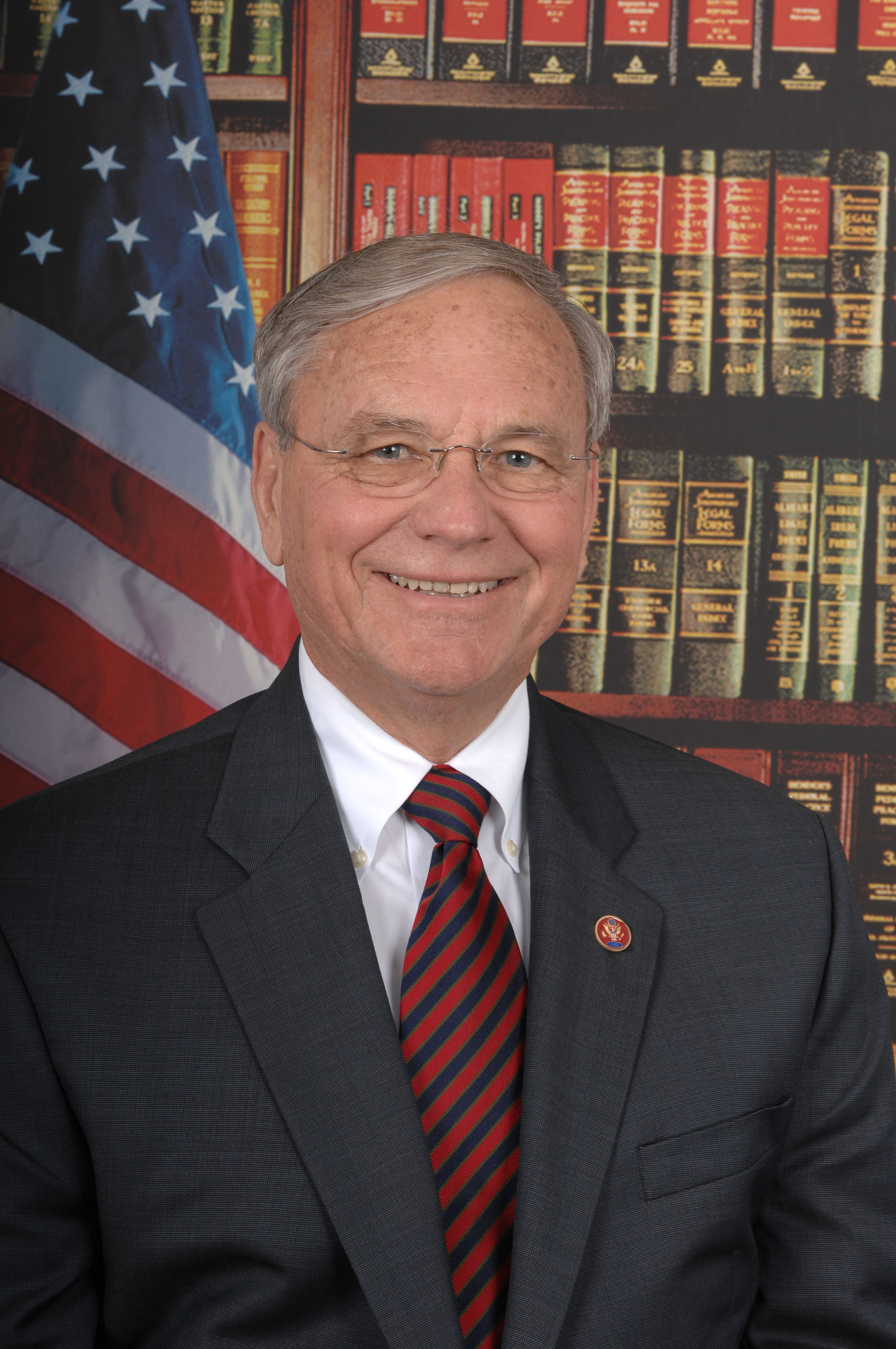
- Official portrait, 2007

Member of the U.S. House of Representatives from Arizona's 5th district
- In office January 3, 2007 – January 3, 2011
- Preceded by: J. D. Hayworth
- Succeeded by: David Schweikert

Chair of the Arizona Democratic Party
- In office 2005–2006
- Preceded by: Jim Pederson
- Succeeded by: David Waid

Member of the Arizona Senate from the 17th district
- In office January 1, 2003 – March 29, 2006
- Preceded by: Brenda Burns
- Succeeded by: Ed Ableser

Member of the Arizona Senate from the 27th district
- In office January 1, 1999 – January 1, 2003
- Preceded by: Gary Richardson
- Succeeded by: Jorge Luis Garcia

30th Mayor of Tempe
- In office July 6, 1978 – July 14, 1994
- Preceded by: William LoPiano
- Succeeded by: Neil Giuliano

Personal details
- Born: Harry Everett Mitchell; July 18, 1940 Phoenix, Arizona, U.S.
- Died: July 29, 2026 (aged 86) Tempe, Arizona, U.S.
- Party: Democratic
- Spouse: Marianne Prevratil (m. 1962; died 2019)
- Relations: William W. Mitchell Sr. (grandfather)
- Children: 2
- Education: Arizona State University, Tempe (BA, MPA)

Harry Everett Mitchell (July 18, 1940 – July 29, 2026) was an American politician and educator. Mitchell served as a U.S. representative representing Arizona's 5th congressional district from 2007 until 2011, an Arizona State Senator from 1999 to 2003, and the longtime mayor of Tempe, Arizona, from 1978 until 1994. He was a member of the Democratic Party.

== Early life, family and education ==
Harry Mitchell was born and raised in Tempe, Arizona. Several of his family members were politically active. His grandfather William W. Mitchell Sr. was a state legislator. Harry's brother Robert Mitchell served as mayor and council member of Casa Grande. Harry's son Mark served as mayor of Tempe.

After graduating from Tempe High School, Harry earned a bachelor's degree in political science from Arizona State University, graduating in 1962. He later earned a Master of Public Administration degree from ASU in 1980.

== Career apart from politics ==
Mitchell was a teacher at his high school alma mater Tempe High School from 1964 to 1992. He was also a professor.

== Political career ==
=== Tempe ===
In 1970, Harry Mitchell sought and won a seat on the elected-at-large Tempe City Council. Re-elected in 1974, Mitchell ran for Mayor of Tempe in 1978, gaining a majority of votes cast in the primary and avoiding a runoff. He went on to win every subsequent election for mayor in landslides until his retirement in 1994. "Above the Crowd", a statue of Mitchell as a stilt walker, stands just off Mill Avenue, next to City Hall and the other buildings comprising the Harry E. Mitchell Municipal Complex.

=== State offices ===
After retiring as Mayor of Tempe in 1994, Mitchell sought the Arizona Democratic Party's nomination for Arizona Superintendent of Public Instruction, a constitutionally mandated statewide-elected official charged with the management of Arizona's public schools. Mitchell narrowly lost in the primary. He attributed his election loss to his inexperience in partisan races; his opponent lost the general election.

Four years later, however, Mitchell sought and won a seat in the Arizona Senate, representing Tempe and parts of southern Scottsdale. Even though his district was considered a "swing" district, Mitchell managed to win with clear majorities in each successive election. He ran under Arizona's Clean Elections law in each legislative race, which provides public financing to statewide and legislative candidates as long as the candidates abide by certain restrictions and qualifications.

Facing term limits, Mitchell ran his last campaign for Arizona Senate in 2004. One year later, with the 2006 midterm elections approaching, Mitchell ran unopposed for chair of the Arizona Democratic Party after chairman Jim Pederson stepped down to run for the United States Senate. He was elected on August 20, 2005.

Mitchell oversaw much of the early ground work as the Arizona Democratic Party prepared for statewide elections on November 7, 2006. The Democrats recaptured the Tucson City Council from years of Republican control on February 1, 2006.

=== US House of Representatives ===
==== Committee assignments ====
- Committee on Science and Technology
  - Subcommittee on Technology and Innovation
- Committee on Transportation and Infrastructure
  - Subcommittee on Aviation
  - Subcommittee on Highways and Transit
  - Subcommittee on Water Resources and Environment
- Committee on Veterans' Affairs
  - Subcommittee on Oversight and Investigations

Mitchell was a member of the Blue Dog Coalition which emphasizes bipartisanship and cooperation with members of other parties. His voting record has been described as having been blue dog and centrist. He voted for legislation largely supported by Democrats in Congress, such as the State Children's Health Insurance Program. Although he expressed reservations about many of the provisions of the Patient Protection and Affordable Care Act, he ultimately voted for it. Stating it was a "matter of principle," he declined coverage under the Federal Employees Health Benefits Program in favor of Medicare. He voted for the 2009 stimulus plan and also stated he supported extending the Bush tax cuts.

== Political campaigns ==
=== 2006 ===
In the spring of 2006, a poll commissioned by the Arizona Democratic Party and the DCCC, was leaked; the poll showed Republican J. D. Hayworth would be in a tight race against any of a handful of Democratic opponents; the district was rated "Toss-Up" by the Cook Political Report. Mitchell was pressured by several Arizona politicians and Rep. Rahm Emanuel, then head of the DCCC, to enter the race against Hayworth.

Mitchell stepped down as state party chairman on April 7. He entered the race on April 10 and raised a total of $213,209 for his campaign in less than two weeks.

By of the end of June 2006, Mitchell had nearly $700,000 on hand. An October 16 SurveyUSA poll showed Hayworth leading Mitchell by only 48% to 45%. On October 27, 2006, the Arizona Republic departed from its past endorsements of Hayworth and instead endorsed Mitchell. The polls demonstrated a slow, but deliberate, growth in the strength of Mitchell's popularity over the next few weeks.

On the evening of November 7, election day, most national and state news media outlets declared Mitchell the winner. However, Hayworth refused to concede, citing the significant number of outstanding absentee and early-voting ballots. As the results were updated each day, Hayworth never demonstrated the significant gains he anticipated. Hayworth conceded on November 14, though Mitchell did not acknowledge his victory until November 22. Mitchell ended up winning by more than 8,000 votes.

When he took office on January 3, 2007, Mitchell became the first Anglo Democrat to represent a significant portion of Phoenix since Sam Coppersmith and Karan English left office in 1995.

=== 2008 ===
Mitchell was reelected in 2008 with 53% of the popular vote over his Republican challenger, former Maricopa County treasurer David Schweikert.

=== 2010 ===
Mitchell lost his bid for reelection in a rematch with Schweikert.

This district has traditionally leaned Republican (R+5 according to analyst Charlie Cook). Thus, according to many analysts, Mitchell faced a difficult reelection campaign. Considering that his district was won by George W. Bush in '04, but not Barack Obama in '08, CQ Politics rated his district as tossup. Sarah Palin had also set a goal of replacing Mitchell with a "common sense conservative."

=== 2012 ===
Mitchell was considered a possible candidate for the US House in 2012 in his former district, which had been renumbered as the 9th district and made slightly more competitive. However, he decided against running.

== Electoral history ==
Arizona's 5th congressional district: 2006–2010 results
Year	Democratic	Votes	Pct	Republican	Votes	Pct	3rd Party	Party	Votes	Pct
2006	Harry Mitchell	101,838	50.41%	J. D. Hayworth*	93,815	46.44%	Warren Severin	Libertarian	6,357	3.15%
2008	Harry Mitchell*	149,033	53.16%	David Schweikert	122,165	43.57%	Warren Severin	Libertarian	9,158	3.27%
2010	Harry Mitchell*	91,749	43.23%	David Schweikert	110,374	52.00%	Nick Coons	Libertarian	10,127	4.77%

== Personal life and death ==
Mitchell and his wife, Marianne, had two children. Their son, Mark Mitchell, is a former mayor of Tempe.

Mitchell was a Catholic.

Marianne Mitchell died on May 27, 2019, "after a years-long battle with Alzheimer's disease." She was 78. Harry Mitchell died on July 29, 2026, at the age of 86.

Party political offices
Preceded by Jim Pederson	Chair of the Arizona Democratic Party; 2005–2006	Succeeded by David Waid
U.S. House of Representatives
Preceded by J. D. Hayworth	Member of the U.S. House of Representatives from Arizona's 5th congressional district 2007–2011	Succeeded by David Schweikert
