= James F. McNulty Jr. =

American politician (1925–2009)

Jim McNulty
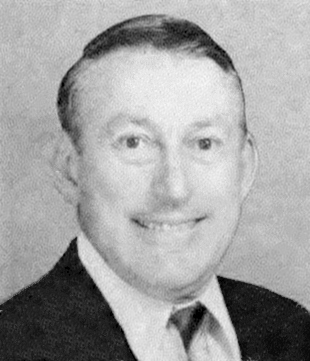
- Official portrait, 1983

Member of the U.S. House of Representatives from Arizona's 5th district
- In office January 3, 1983 – January 3, 1985
- Preceded by: New Constituency
- Succeeded by: Jim Kolbe

Personal details
- Born: October 18, 1925 Boston, Massachusetts, U.S.
- Died: June 30, 2009 (aged 83) Tucson, Arizona, U.S.
- Party: Democratic
- Spouse: Jacquie

Military service
- Allegiance: United States
- Branch/service: United States Army
- Years of service: 1944–1945

James Francis McNulty Jr. (October 18, 1925 – June 30, 2009) was a one-term congressman and U.S. politician hailing from the Democratic party. He served as the U.S. representative from Arizona's 5th congressional district.

He was born in Boston, Massachusetts and attended college at the University of Arizona where he was a member of Phi Delta Theta fraternity. He served in the Arizona State Senate from 1969 to 1975. He defeated State Senator Jim Kolbe by around 1600 votes when the 5th District was created. However, two years later, Kolbe unseated McNulty in a rematch, largely due to the district running about 60 percent for President Ronald Reagan.

McNulty resided in Tucson, Arizona with his wife Jacqui until his death on June 30, 2009. He had retired from law practice in 2000.

U.S. House of Representatives
Preceded by District created	United States Representative for the 5th congressional district of Arizona; 1983–1985	Succeeded by Jim Kolbe
