= Fountain Hills, Arizona =

Town in Maricopa County, Arizona

- Town
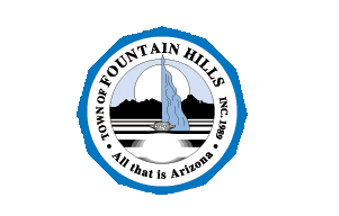
- Flag Seal
- Motto: "All That Is Arizona"
- Location of Fountain Hills in Maricopa County, Arizona

- Location within Arizona Location within the United States
- Coordinates: 33°36′N 111°43′W
- Country: United States
- State: Arizona
- County: Maricopa
- Incorporated: 1989

Government
  - Mayor: Gerry Friedel

Area
  - Total: 20.37 sq mi (52.76 km^{2})
  - Land: 20.28 sq mi (52.53 km^{2})
  - Water: 0.085 sq mi (0.22 km^{2})
- Elevation: 1,798 ft (548 m)

Population (2020)
  - Total: 23,820
  - Density: 1,174.4/sq mi (453.43/km^{2})
- Time zone: UTC-7 (MST (no DST))
- ZIP codes: 85268-85269
- Area code: 480
- FIPS code: 04-25300
- GNIS feature ID: 2412647
- Website: www.fountainhillsaz.gov

Fountain Hills is a town in Maricopa County, Arizona, United States. Known for its impressive fountain, which can shoot water to a height of 560 feet (170 m), it borders the Fort McDowell Yavapai Nation, Salt River Pima-Maricopa Indian Community, and Scottsdale.

The population was 23,820 as of the 2020 census. Between the 1990 and 2000 censuses it was the eighth-fastest-growing place among cities and towns in Arizona. The median value of an owner-occupied housing during the period 2016–2020 was estimated at $402,100.

== History ==
Before the development of Fountain Hills, the area was home to the Yavapai people, and petroglyphs can be found near the Dixie Mine in the northwest corner of the town along the mountains.

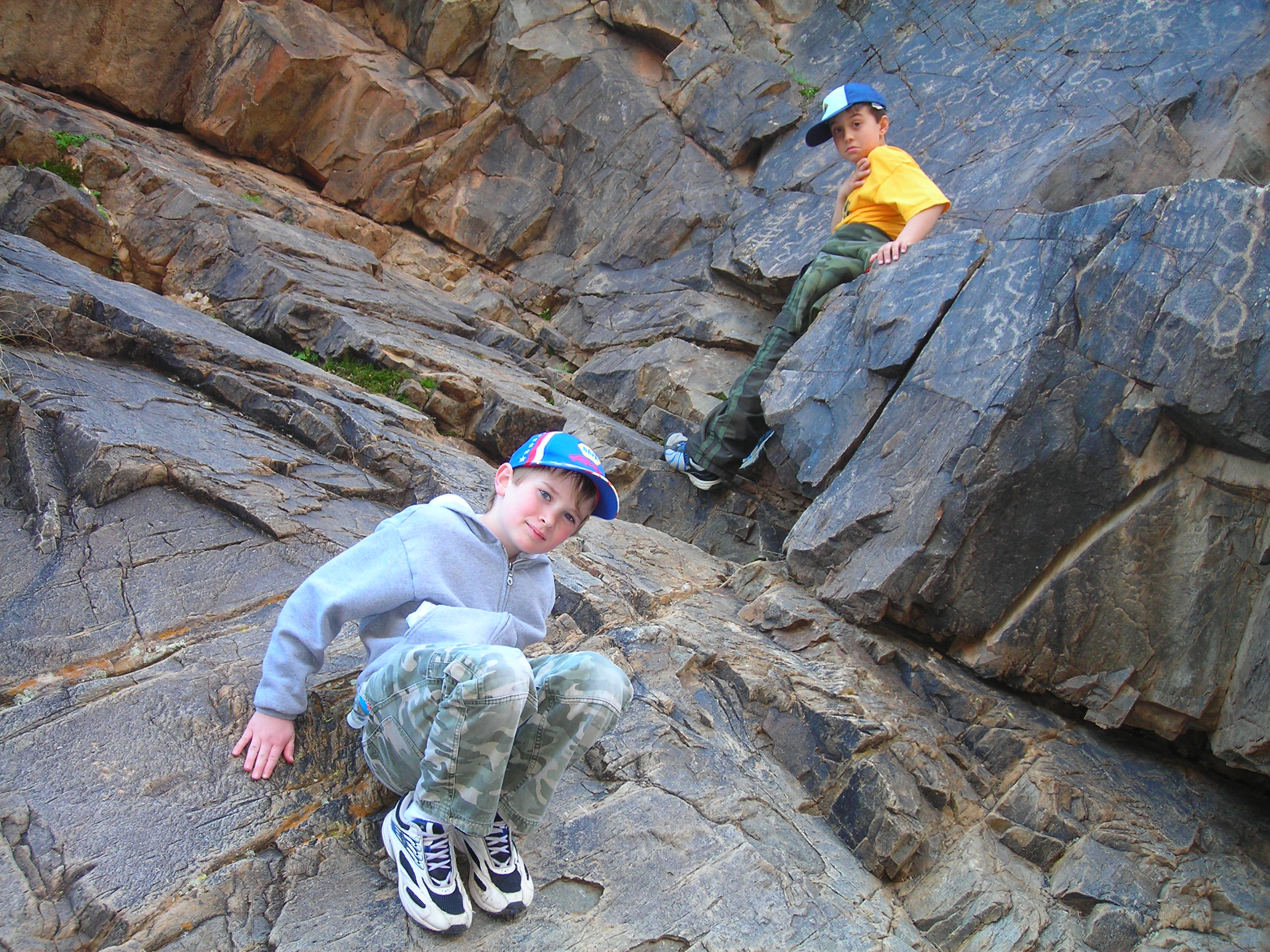
Two boys posing at the petroglyphs by the Dixie Mine, Fountain Hills, AZ

In the early 20th century, the area that became Fountain Hills and the McDowell Mountain Regional Park was part of the Pemberton Ranch, later renamed the P-Bar Ranch. Fountain Hills High School is built on the site of one of the P-Bar Ranch's buildings, and a plaque stands in the parking lot to commemorate this.

Fountain Hills was developed by C. V. Wood, president of McCulloch Oil. It was named after the towering man-made fountain in the center of town, built in 1970, and once the tallest in the world.. The town was incorporated in 1989.

== The Fountain ==
Fountain Hills has the world's fourth-tallest fountain, and the tallest still operating in the United States. It was built in 1970 in Zurich by Robert P. McCulloch, the year before the reconstruction of the London Bridge in Lake Havasu City, another of McCulloch's projects. The fountain sprays water for about 15 minutes every hour on the hour between 9am and 9pm. The plume rises from a concrete water-lily sculpture in the center of a large man-made lake. The fountain, driven by three 600 horsepower (450 kW) turbine pumps, sprays water at a rate of 7,000 US gallons (26,000 L; 5,800 imp gal) per minute through an 18-inch (460 mm) nozzle. With all three pumps under ideal conditions, the fountain reaches 560 feet (170 m) in height, though in normal operation only two of the pumps are used, with a fountain height of around 300 feet (91 m). When built it was the world's tallest fountain, a record it held for over a decade.

The Town of Fountain Hills has partnered with EarthCam to bring live streaming views of its world-famous fountain. The live stream camera can be accessed on the Experience Fountain Hills website.

To help celebrate the fountain's 50th year, the town installed a new LED lighting system with four lights mounted directly under the fountain and six lights on the banks for a total of 10 lights to provide ample lighting and still meet the Dark Skies regulations.

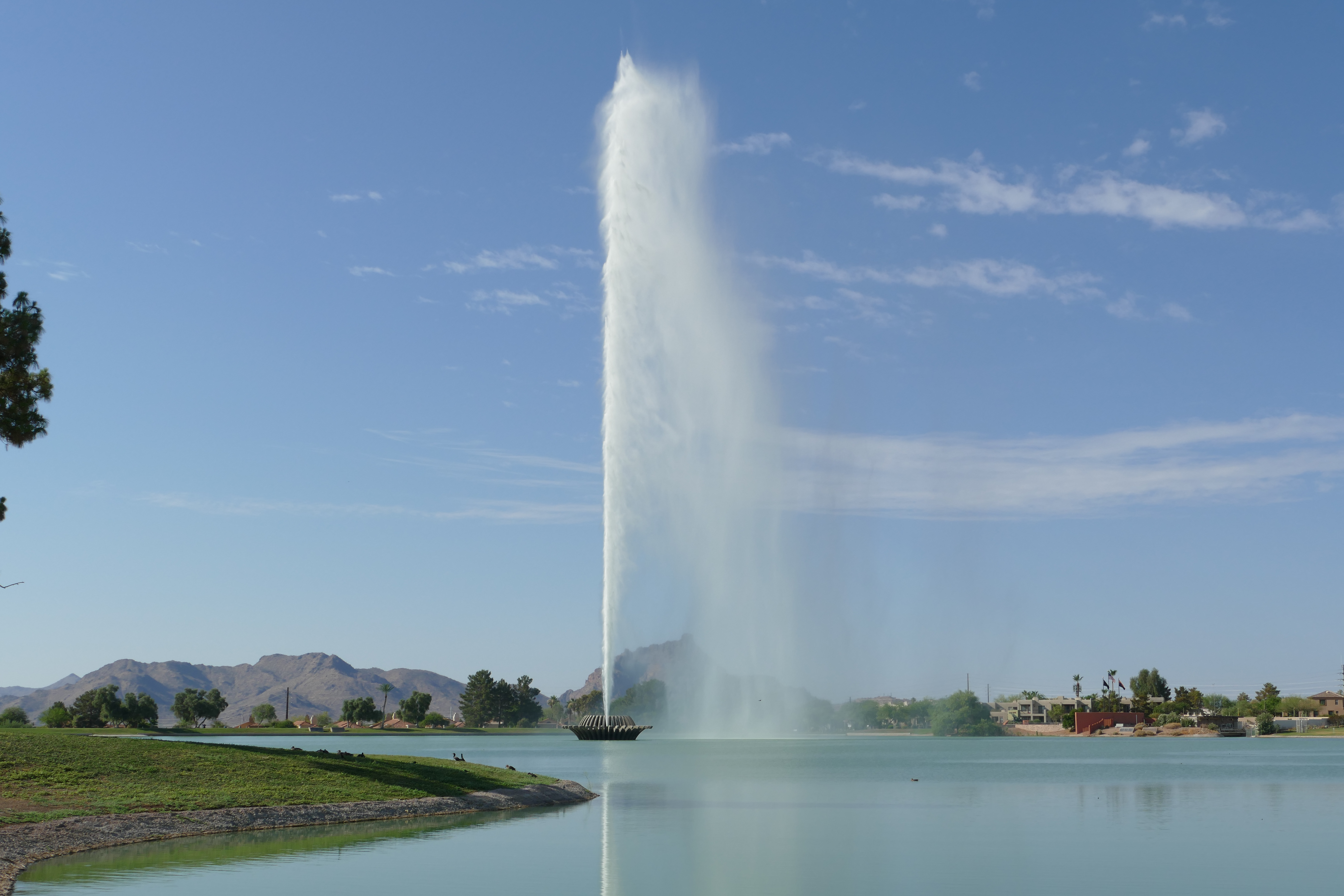
The "World Famous Fountain" in Fountain Hills can attain a height of 560 feet (170 m) when running on all three of its pumps.

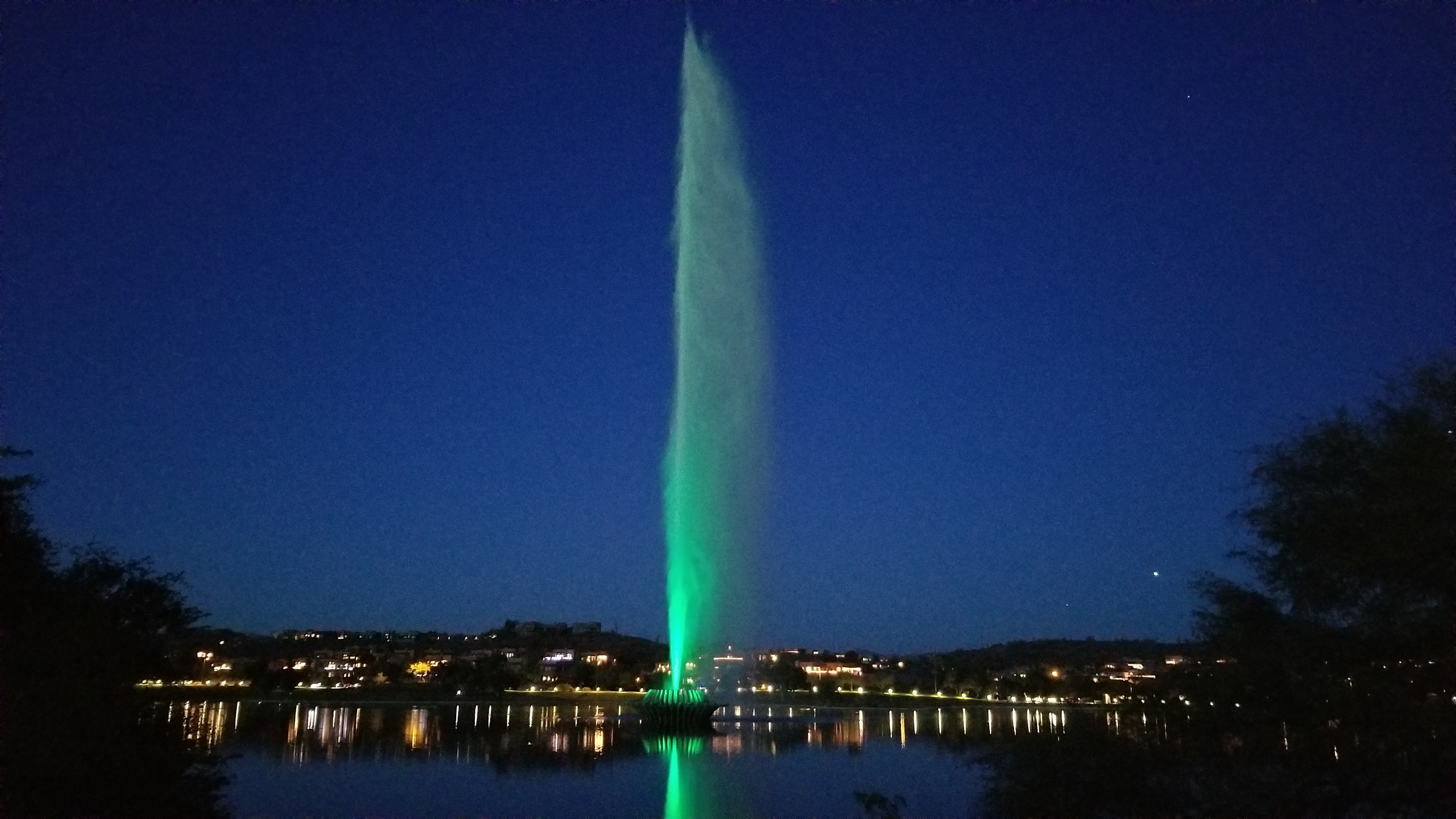
The fountain in Fountain Park is lighted with LED lights during holidays and special events. There are eight colors available to shine on the spray.

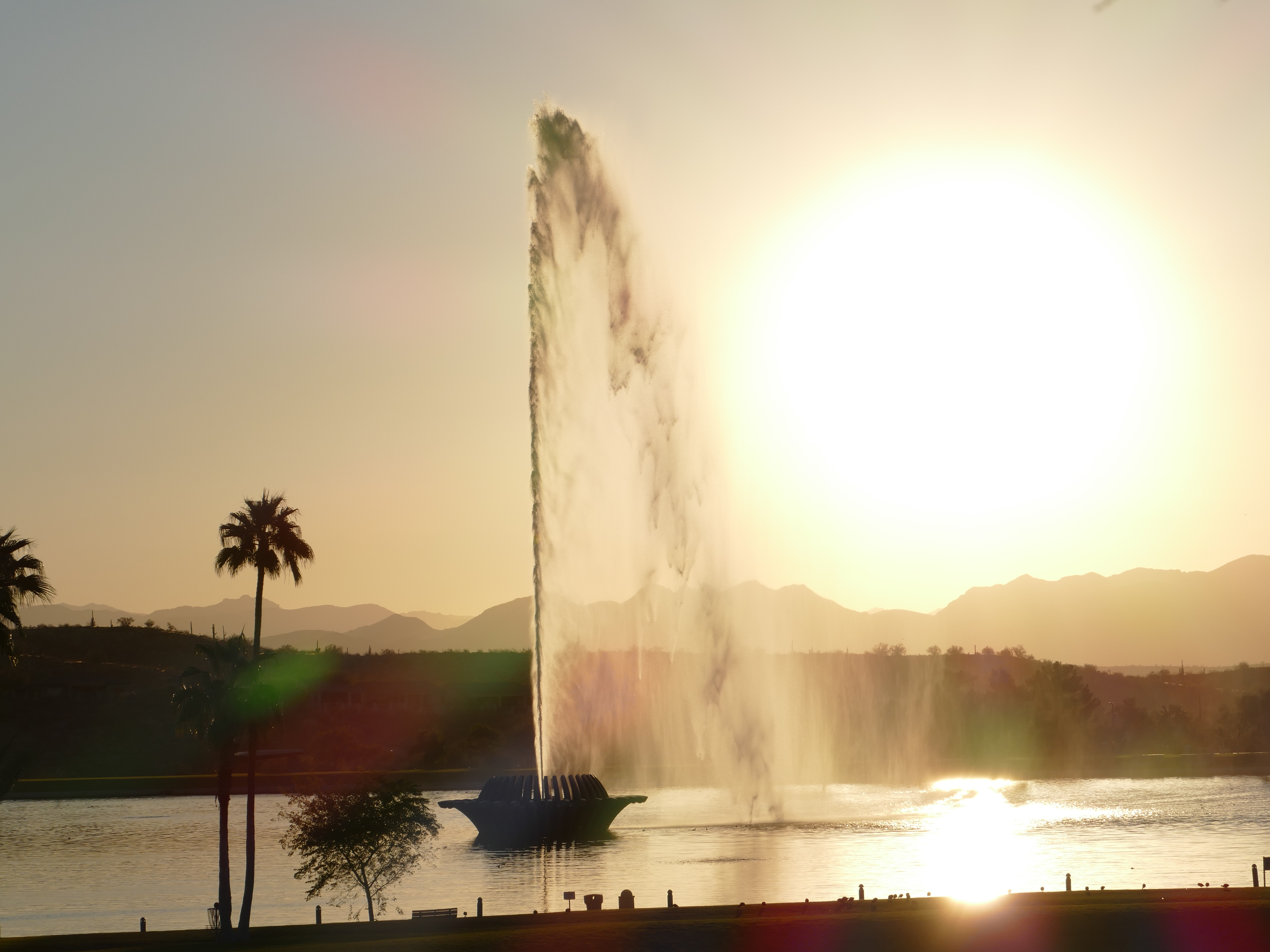
The fountain of Fountain Hills

== Geography ==
Fountain Hills is in eastern Maricopa County, on the eastern edge of the Phoenix urbanized area. It is 31 miles (50 km) northeast of downtown Phoenix and sits on the east side of the south end of the McDowell Mountains. According to the U.S. Census Bureau, the town has a total area of 20.4 square miles (53 km^{2}), of which 0.1 square miles (0.26 km^{2}), or 0.42%, are water. The elevation is 1,520 feet (460 m) at the fountain, 500 feet (150 m) higher than in Phoenix. The elevation reaches 3,190 feet (970 m) on the western border of the town, on a spur of the McDowell Mountains.

To the east of the town is the Verde River, a tributary to the Salt River. Many washes run through the city and into the Verde River. Some of these include the Ashbrook, Balboa, Legend, and Colony Washes. During times of rain the washes flood with water that can sometimes block traffic. Signs mark several of the intersections of washes and major streets in the town.

To the southwest and northwest regions of Fountain Hills are the McDowell Mountains, a chain of extinct volcanic remnants. The highest mountains in the range are East End (4,067 ft; 1,240 m), McDowell Peak (4,034 ft; 1,230 m), and Thompson Peak (3,982 ft; 1,214 m), all in neighboring Scottsdale.

== Climate ==
The area has a large amount of sunshine year-round due to its stable descending air and high pressure. According to the Köppen Climate Classification system, Fountain Hills has a hot desert climate, abbreviated "BWh" on climate maps.

Climate data for Fountain Hills, Arizona, 1991–2020 normals, extremes 1979–present
Month	Jan	Feb	Mar	Apr	May	Jun	Jul	Aug	Sep	Oct	Nov	Dec	Year
Record high °F (°C)	82 (28)	91 (33)	101 (38)	107 (42)	114 (46)	121 (49)	125 (52)	118 (48)	115 (46)	107 (42)	95 (35)	84 (29)	125 (52)
Mean maximum °F (°C)	75.6 (24.2)	80.4 (26.9)	88.6 (31.4)	97.4 (36.3)	103.9 (39.9)	110.9 (43.8)	112.6 (44.8)	111.4 (44.1)	107.7 (42.1)	100.5 (38.1)	87.5 (30.8)	76.5 (24.7)	114.0 (45.6)
Mean daily maximum °F (°C)	63.9 (17.7)	67.4 (19.7)	73.9 (23.3)	82.0 (27.8)	91.0 (32.8)	100.6 (38.1)	103.0 (39.4)	101.9 (38.8)	97.1 (36.2)	86.6 (30.3)	73.7 (23.2)	63.0 (17.2)	83.7 (28.7)
Daily mean °F (°C)	54.2 (12.3)	56.8 (13.8)	62.3 (16.8)	69.2 (20.7)	77.8 (25.4)	86.7 (30.4)	91.6 (33.1)	90.9 (32.7)	85.4 (29.7)	74.6 (23.7)	62.5 (16.9)	53.5 (11.9)	72.1 (22.3)
Mean daily minimum °F (°C)	44.5 (6.9)	46.2 (7.9)	50.7 (10.4)	56.4 (13.6)	64.5 (18.1)	72.8 (22.7)	80.3 (26.8)	79.8 (26.6)	73.7 (23.2)	62.6 (17.0)	51.3 (10.7)	43.9 (6.6)	60.6 (15.9)
Mean minimum °F (°C)	32.6 (0.3)	35.0 (1.7)	39.7 (4.3)	45.1 (7.3)	53.1 (11.7)	62.0 (16.7)	69.6 (20.9)	69.9 (21.1)	62.8 (17.1)	48.8 (9.3)	38.9 (3.8)	31.9 (−0.1)	29.8 (−1.2)
Record low °F (°C)	23 (−5)	25 (−4)	30 (−1)	36 (2)	44 (7)	49 (9)	57 (14)	58 (14)	51 (11)	37 (3)	29 (−2)	24 (−4)	23 (−5)
Average precipitation inches (mm)	1.41 (36)	1.33 (34)	1.28 (33)	0.33 (8.4)	0.23 (5.8)	0.14 (3.6)	0.80 (20)	1.33 (34)	0.81 (21)	0.63 (16)	0.74 (19)	1.15 (29)	10.18 (259)
Average precipitation days	3.6	3.9	3.4	1.4	1.2	0.3	2.9	4.4	2.6	2.3	2.2	3.4	31.6
Source: NOAA

== Demographics ==
Historical population
Census	Pop.	Note	%±
1980	2,771		—
1990	10,030		262.0%
2000	20,235		101.7%
2010	22,489		11.1%
2020	23,820		5.9%
U.S. Decennial Census

=== Racial and ethnic composition ===
Fountain Hills town, Arizona – Racial composition Note: the US Census treats Hispanic/Latino as an ethnic category. This table excludes Latinos from the racial categories and assigns them to a separate category. Hispanics/Latinos may be of any race.
Race (NH = Non-Hispanic)	2020	2010	2000	1990	1980
White alone (NH)	87.6% (20,876)	91.5% (20,569)	94.2% (19,055)	96% (9,626)	97.9% (2,713)
Black alone (NH)	1.1% (265)	0.9% (210)	0.6% (118)	0.4% (41)	0% (0)
American Indian alone (NH)	0.4% (100)	0.5% (107)	0.4% (80)	0.5% (52)	0.7% (19)
Asian alone (NH)	2.3% (550)	1.8% (403)	0.9% (176)	0.5% (50)	0.5% (14)
Pacific Islander alone (NH)	0% (9)	0.1% (21)	0.1% (12)		
Other race alone (NH)	0.4% (88)	0.1% (33)	0.1% (13)	0% (4)	0% (0)
Multiracial (NH)	2.9% (690)	1% (221)	0.8% (163)	—	—
Hispanic/Latino (any race)	5.2% (1,242)	4.1% (925)	3.1% (618)	2.6% (257)	0.9% (25)

=== 2020 census ===
As of the 2020 census, Fountain Hills had a population of 23,820. The median age was 60.8 years. 9.8% of residents were under the age of 18 and 40.9% of residents were 65 years of age or older. For every 100 females there were 90.9 males, and for every 100 females age 18 and over there were 89.0 males age 18 and over.

97.1% of residents lived in urban areas, while 2.9% lived in rural areas.

There were 11,482 households in Fountain Hills, of which 13.4% had children under the age of 18 living in them. Of all households, 56.2% were married-couple households, 14.0% were households with a male householder and no spouse or partner present, and 24.5% were households with a female householder and no spouse or partner present. About 28.2% of all households were made up of individuals, and 16.6% had someone living alone who was 65 years of age or older. The average household size was 2.16 and the average family size was 2.56.

There were 13,883 housing units, of which 17.3% were vacant. The homeowner vacancy rate was 2.0% and the rental vacancy rate was 10.5%.

=== Income and poverty ===
According to the 2020 American Community Survey, the median income for a household in Fountain Hills for the period 2016-2020 was $85,200. The per capita income for the town was $59,791. About 3.3% of families and 4.6% of the population were below the poverty line, including 3.5% of those under age 18 and 3.6% of those age 65 or over.

== Arts and culture ==
=== International Dark Sky Community ===
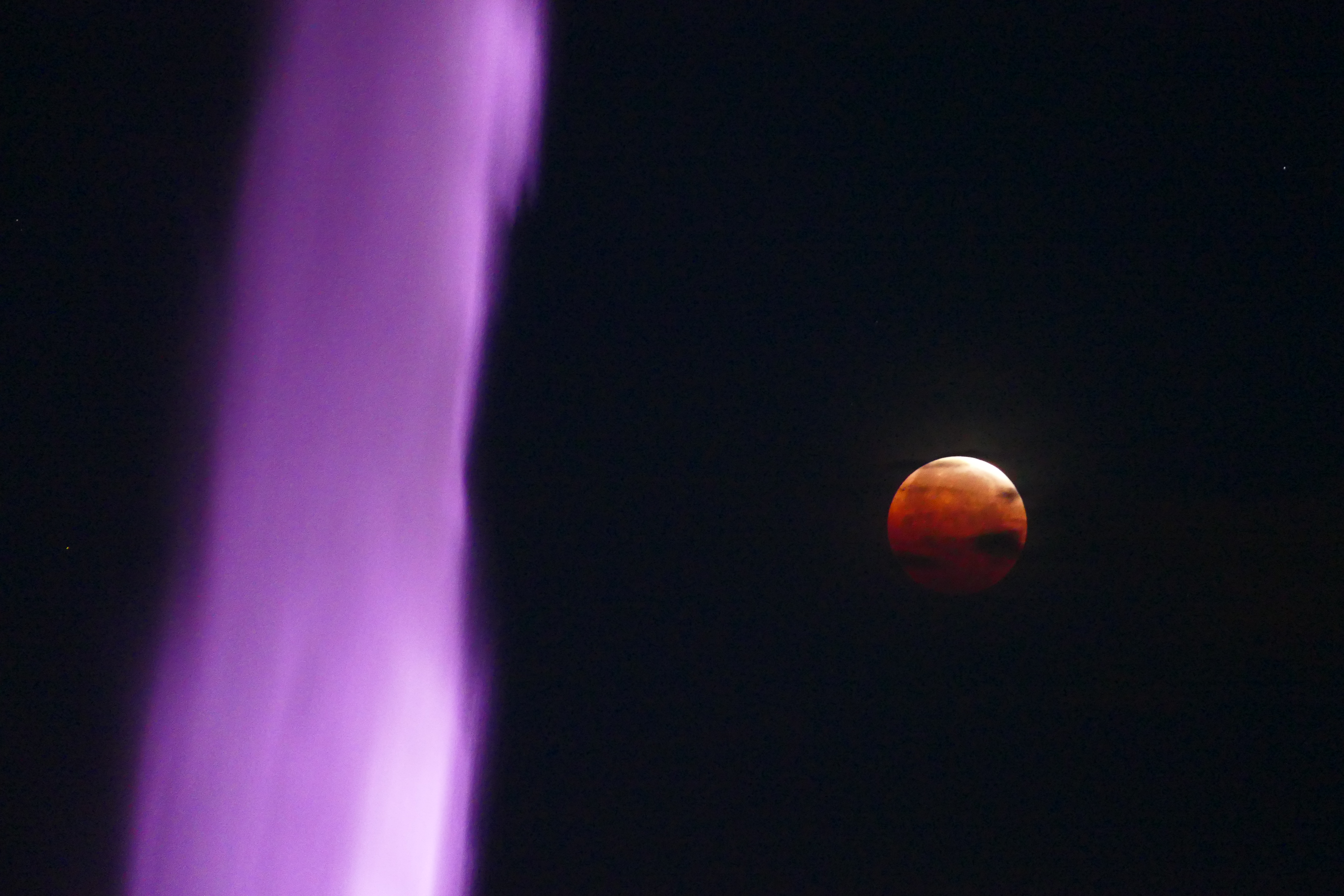
Lunar Eclipse over Fountain Park in Fountain Hills

In January 2018, the town of Fountain Hills was designated an International Dark Sky Community by the International Dark Sky Association. The town is one of only two International Dark Sky Communities located near a large metropolitan area. As of 2021, 34 communities in the world have earned the Community designation, among Dark Sky Reserves, Parks, and Sanctuaries. The Fountain Hills Dark Sky Association (FHDSA) worked with town council and town staff to change outdoor lighting and sign ordinances to address light pollution. This designation is a result of both geography and lighting ordinances. The community is shielded from the lights of the larger cities in the Phoenix metro region by the McDowell Mountains to the west. The Fort McDowell Yavapai Nation to the east, the Salt River Pima-Maricopa Indian Community to the south, and the McDowell Mountain Regional Park all help the town preserve its dark skies. The absence of street lights and the presence of only low-impact outdoor lighting creates an outstanding environment for stargazing. The Fountain Hills Dark Sky Association is currently working to develop a 15,000 square feet (1,400 m^{2}) International Dark Sky Discovery Center that will include a Dark Sky Observatory, Hyperspace Planetarium, Inspiration Theater, and an Immersion Zone. Fountain Hills was the home to Charles W. Juels' Fountain Hills Observatory (678), where 475 asteroids were discovered between 1999 and 2003, including 20898 Fountainhills.

== Events ==
The town hosts a number of events each year at Fountain Park, including three large art fairs: the Spring Fountain Festival of Fine Arts and Crafts and the Fall Fountain Festival of Fine Arts and Crafts, both presented by the Fountain Hills Chamber of Commerce. Each year, the town hosts a St. Patrick's Day celebration in which the town's fountain is dyed green. The Greening of the Fountain tradition began in 1979. Other signature events include a 4 July celebration, an annual Music Fest, Irish Fest, and Concours in the Hills — a car show which featured over 1,000 vehicles and 50,000 attendees in February 2024.

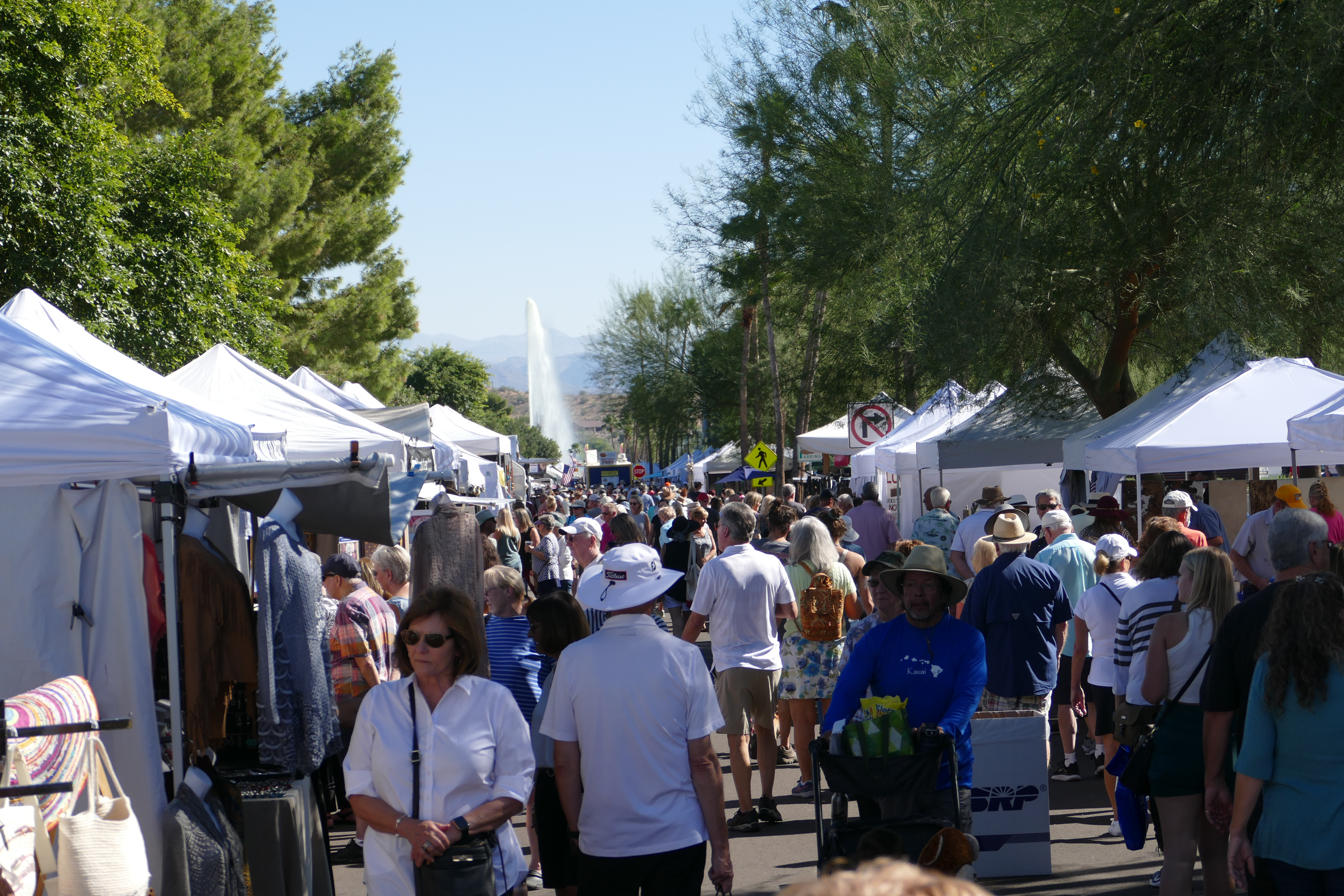
The Annual Fountain Festival celebrates the arts in Fountain Hills each fall.

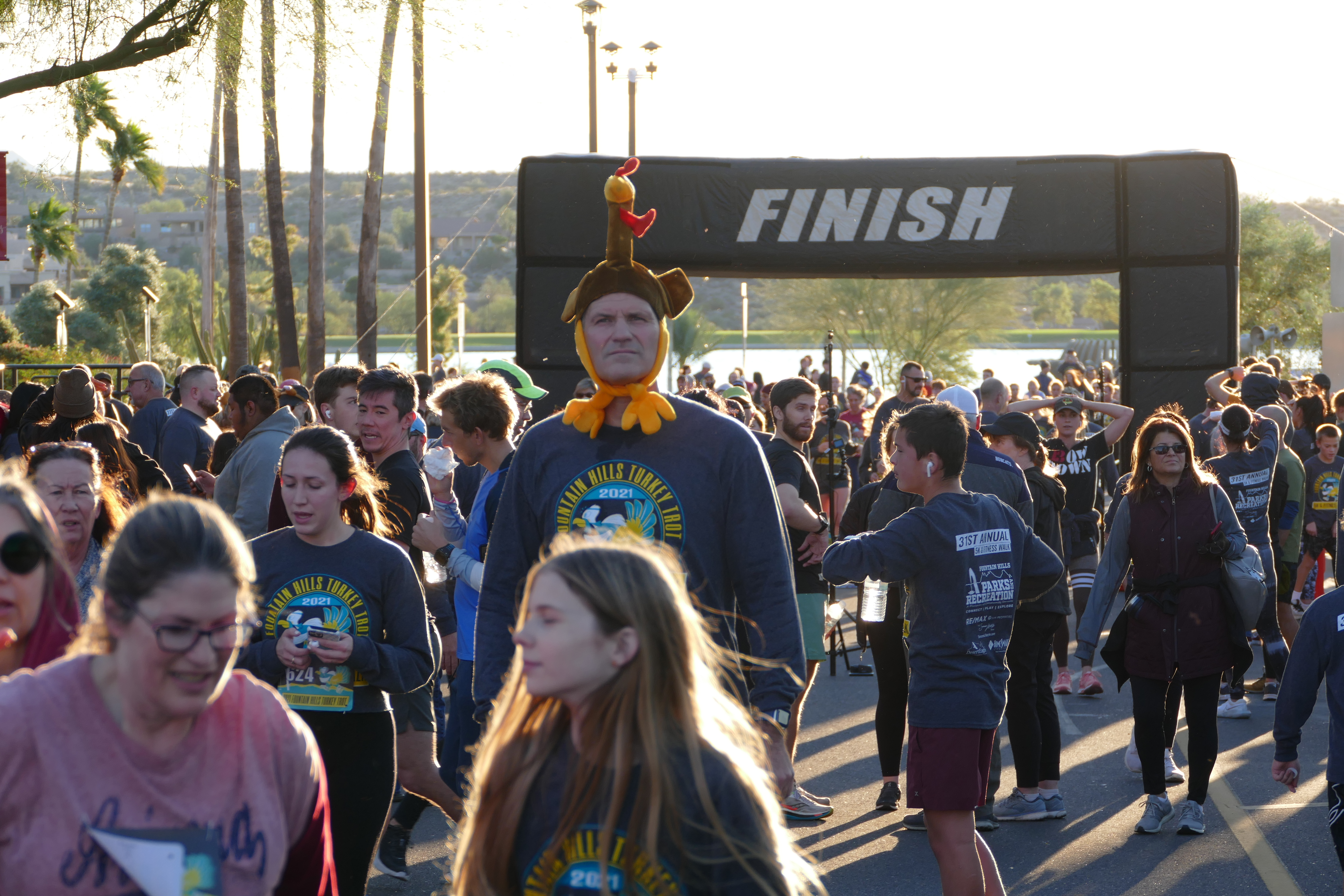
For 31 years, the Turkey Trot has been a family tradition Thanksgiving morning.

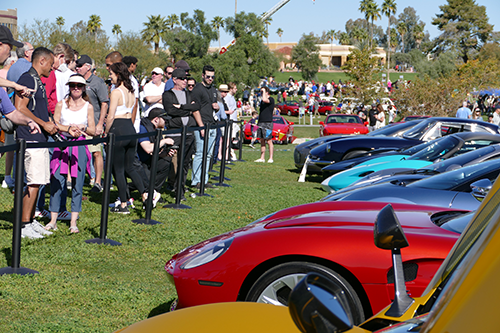
More than 1,000 high-end cars from around the world drew nearly 50,000 enthusiasts to Fountain Hills for Concours in the Hills 2022.

== Arts ==
Fountain Hills is home to one of the largest public art collections in Arizona. The art collection, which features over 150 pieces, is part of a partnership between the Town of Fountains Hills and the Public Art Committee of the Fountain Hills Cultural and Civic Association. Art is a significant part of the Town's heritage. The eight fountains along the Avenue of the Fountains were the beginning of the public art collection. Bronze sculptures and fountains with Community Profile themes ranging from the whimsical to the serious dot the streets and adorn the public buildings, plazas and parks. The collection also contains a wide variety of other art types and media, including paintings, stone, photography and metals. Residents and visitors are invited to wander the streets or take the "Art Walk" guided tour.

Fountain Hills Theater is a performing arts venue entering its 28th season and offering over 16 productions a year to local communities as well as performing an arts education year-round for youth.

== Government ==
Fountain Hills has a council–manager system. The current mayor of Fountain Hills is Gerry Friedel, first elected in November 2024. The current Town Council consists of the mayor and six councilmembers. Councilmembers include Vice Mayor Gayle Earle, Brenda Kalivianakis, Hannah Larrabee, Peggy McMahon, Allen Skillicorn, and Rick Watts. Councilmembers serve four-year terms, and the mayor serves a two-year term. The council selects a town manager, attorney, and magistrate. Rachael Goodwin has been the Town Manager since 2023. The town contracts its law enforcement services with the Maricopa County Sheriff's Office. The Fountain Hills Fire Department has two fire stations. Dave Ott is the fire chief. Fountain Hills is in Arizona's 1st congressional district and Arizona's 3rd state legislative district.

== List of mayors ==
List of mayors of Fountain Hills, Arizona
Mayor	Term
John Cutillo	1989–1996
Jerry Miles	1996–1998
Jon Beydler	1998–2002
Sharon Morgan	2002–2008
Wally Nichols	2008–2010
Jay Schlum	2010–2014
Linda Kavanagh	2014–2018
Ginny Dickey	2018–2025
Gerry Friedel	2025–Present

== Education ==
Fountain Hills Public Schools are part of the Fountain Hills Unified School District #98. The district provides education from pre-school through high school with Little Falcons Preschool, McDowell Mountain Elementary, Fountain Hills Middle School, and Fountain Hills High School. The district has small class sizes at an average of 18:1, and it includes a special education program, Fountain Hills Virtual Academy, and a career and technical education program.

== Media ==
The Fountain Hills Times Independent is the town's weekly newspaper. The paper has a weekly circulation of about 3,000.

Independent Newsmedia, Inc. is the parent company, and it also owns Valley Newspapers, a commercial printing plant located near Deer Valley Airport. The company also publishes community newspapers in Delaware, the Eastern Shore of Maryland, and Florida, and it owns a press in Delaware. The Times also publishes the Fountain Hills/Rio Verde Telephone Directory, Fountain Hills Community Guide, Fountain Hills HOME.

== Notable people ==
- Kathy Ahern, professional golfer
- Steven Alker, professional golfer
- Joe Arpaio, former Maricopa County Sheriff
- Charles Juels, astronomer
- David Schweikert, U.S. Congressman

== Sister cities ==
Fountain Hills has three sister cities, as designated by Sister Cities International:

- Concepcion de Ataco, El Salvador
- Dierdorf, Rhineland-Palatinate, Germany
- Zamość, Poland
