= 2010 United States Senate election in Arizona =

- November 2, 2010
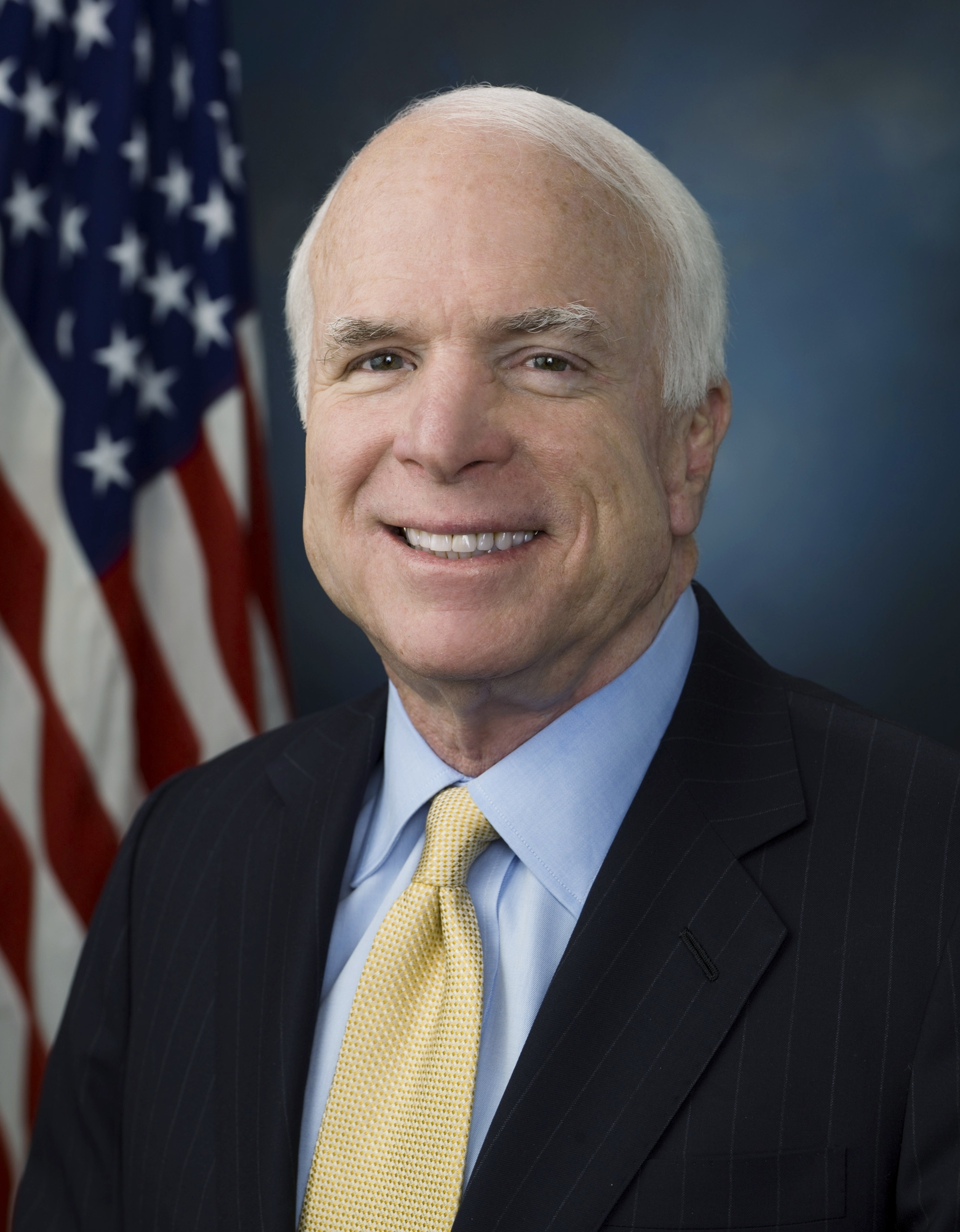

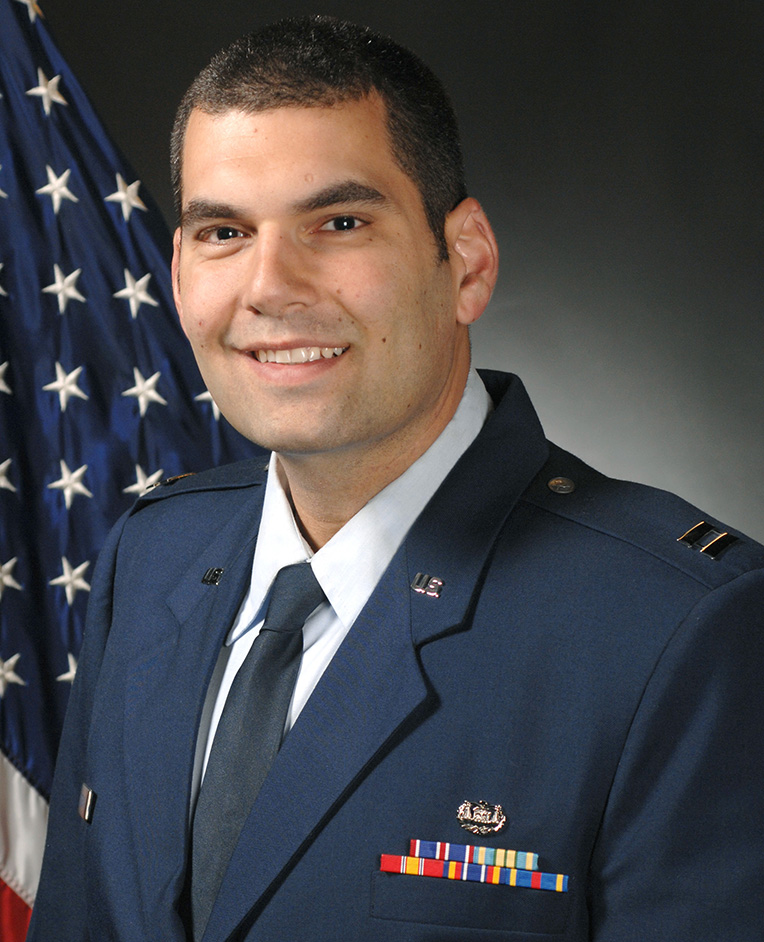
Nominee	John McCain	Rodney Glassman
Party	Republican	Democratic
Popular vote	1,005,615	592,011
Percentage	59.07%	34.78%
- McCain: 40–50% 50–60% 60–70% 70–80% 80–90% >90% Glassman: 40–50% 50–60% 60–70% 70–80% 80–90% >90% Tie: 40–50% 50% No votes
U.S. senator before election
John McCain
Republican
Elected U.S. Senator
John McCain
Republican

The 2010 United States Senate election in Arizona took place on November 2, 2010, along with other elections to the United States Senate in other states as well as elections to the United States House of Representatives and various state and local elections. The primaries were held on August 24, 2010. Incumbent Republican U.S. Senator John McCain, who had lost the 2008 presidential election to then-United States Senator from Illinois Barack Obama, ran for reelection to a fifth term and won, defeating Democratic challenger Rodney Glassman. As of 2026, this was the last time the counties of Coconino and Pima voted for the Republican candidate.

== Republican primary ==
=== Background ===
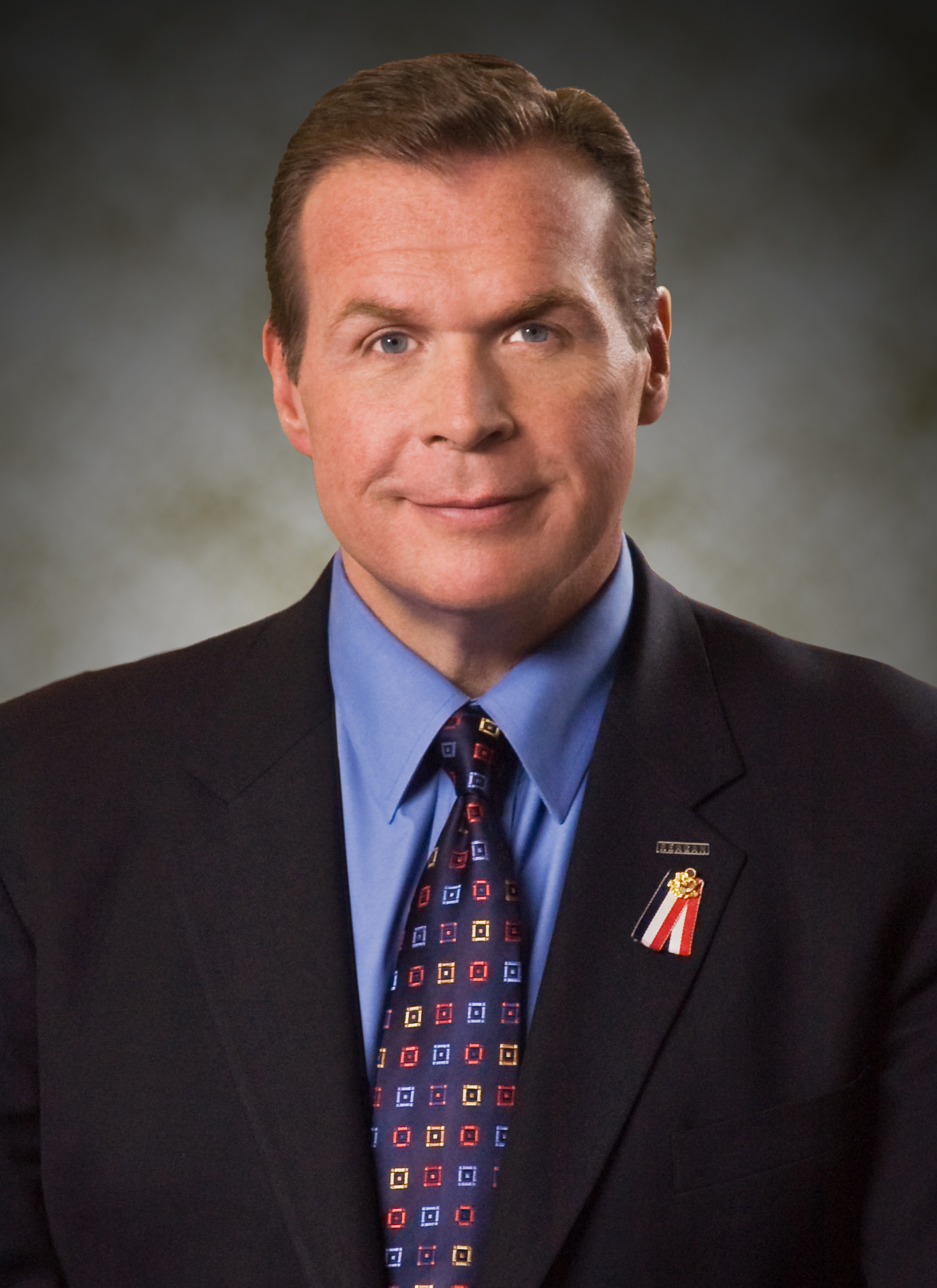
J. D. Hayworth

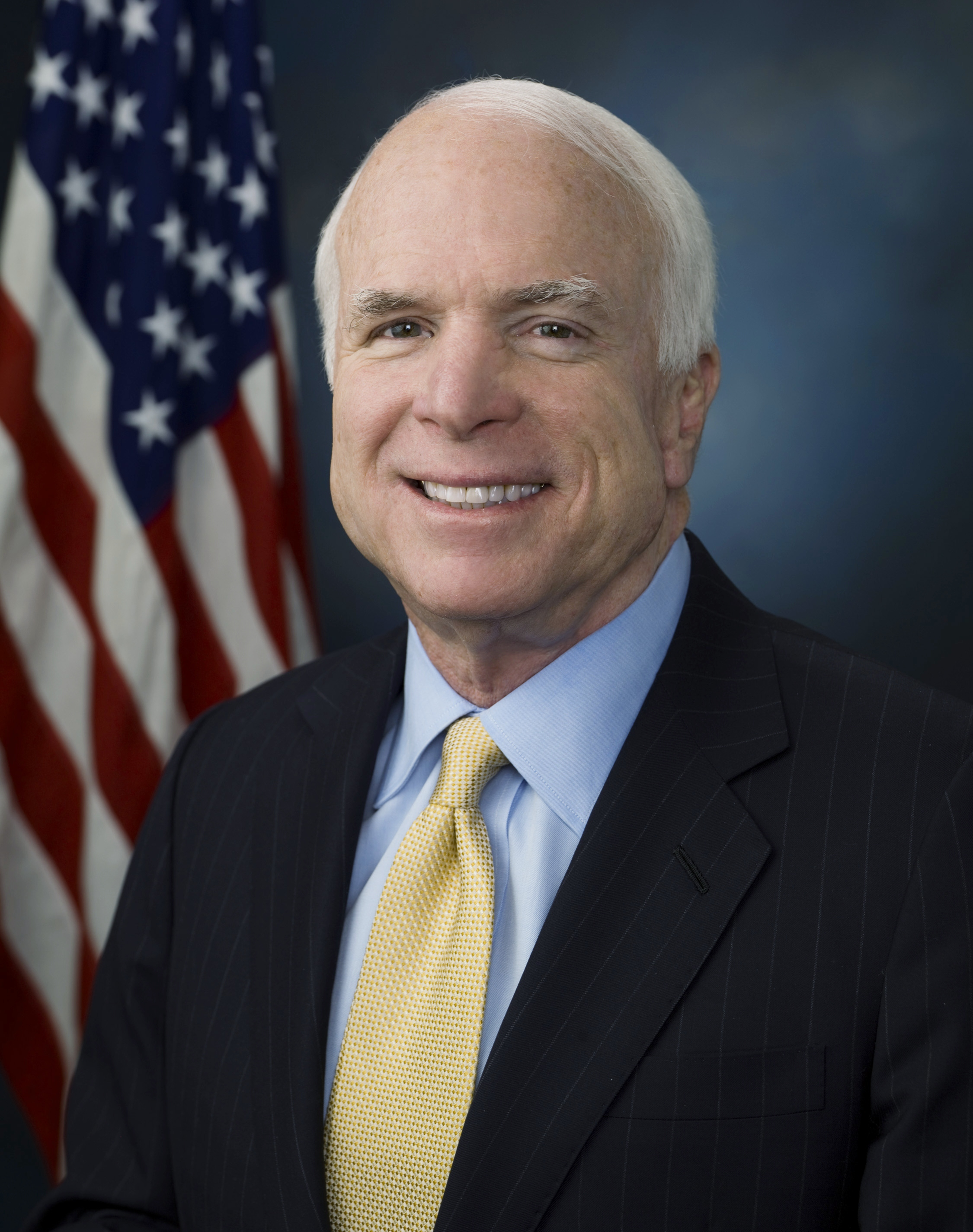
John McCain

Incumbent Republican senator John McCain lost his bid for President of the United States in the 2008 election on November 4, 2008. By November 18, he had indicated his intention to form a political action committee to run for Senate re-election in 2010. McCain confirmed his decision at a press conference in Phoenix, Arizona, on November 25, 2008, saying, "I intend to run again and will make an announcement at an appropriate time." In his appearance, McCain made a point of shifting from discussion of national issues to local ones, and followed up with renewed attention to the state during the next few months. In February 2009, McCain began active fundraising efforts for his re-election campaign.

McCain faced a possible Republican primary challenge. He had won less than half the votes against the field of candidates in the 2008 Arizona Republican presidential primary, and had only won the presidential contest in Arizona by 8.5 percentage points. The person most mentioned as a possible primary challenger was radio talk show host and former U.S. congressman J. D. Hayworth, who was being urged to run by his listeners. (Hayworth had once been allied with McCain and had supported his 2000 presidential campaign, but the two diverged ideologically shortly thereafter.) However, McCain's strong opposition to the economic stimulus package of 2009 warmed some conservatives to him and made a primary challenge less likely.

As 2009 progressed, McCain got two announced primary challengers, U.S. Navy veteran and businessman Jim Deakin, and Chris Simcox, the co-founder of the Minuteman Civil Defense Corps. Simcox's April 2009 announcement of his candidacy garnered a fair amount of press attention; he stated that "John McCain has failed miserably in his duty to secure this nation's borders and protect the people of Arizona from the escalating violence and lawlessness. ... Coupled with his votes for reckless bailout spending and big government solutions to our nation's problems, John McCain is out of touch with everyday Arizonans. Enough is enough."

In October 2009, Hayworth said that he was considering a primary challenge: "There's a great deal of respect for John as a historical figure. But he's long been at odds with the conservative base of the Republican Party and more recently with Arizonans." Hayworth quoted a poll which said that 61 percent of Arizona Republicans thought McCain had lost touch with his party. McCain had raised $4.7 million for his Senate re-election, and he had access to more than $20 million left over from his 2008 presidential effort. A November 2009 Rasmussen Reports poll surprisingly showed that Hayworth was nearly even with McCain among likely Republican Party primary voters in the state. As January 2010 progressed, McCain began running negative ads against Hayworth. On January 22, 2010, Hayworth resigned from his talk radio position at KFYI, a necessary step to becoming a candidate. On January 23, Hayworth announced at a meeting of the Arizona Republican Party State Committee that he did intend to run, and that a formal announcement would be forthcoming soon.

As the contest began, some elements of the Tea Party movement supported Hayworth, but others stayed out of the contest, and still others supported Jim Deakin. The threat from Hayworth helped account for McCain's sometimes-awkward reversals or softpedallings of his former positions on issues such as the bank bailouts, national security, campaign finance reform, and gays in the military; Hayworth said, "John is undergoing a campaign conversion." McCain remained strong among party centrists and independents, and had strong financial resources. McCain also had the endorsements of the entire Arizona congressional delegation. Regardless, pundits predicted it would become "one of the country's fiercest political contests of 2010."

Hayworth officially launched his bid on February 15, 2010, in Phoenix. His announcement led Simcox to drop his campaign and endorse Hayworth, saying that he wanted to present a united conservative front. Hayworth attracted the support of a good number of top-rated radio talk show hosts, including Michael Savage. Hayworth called for a series of 10 debates between himself and McCain. This echoed a proposal that McCain had unsuccessfully made to Obama during their 2008 presidential campaign; this time, McCain labeled the idea a "desperate publicity stunt." With Hayworth using the campaign slogan "The Consistent Conservative," McCain backed off his reputation for unorthodoxy, saying, "I never considered myself a maverick. I consider myself a person who serves the people of Arizona to the best of his abilities." McCain's former vice presidential running mate, Sarah Palin, staged a campaign appearance with him in late March; she said that McCain was deserving of support among Tea Party movement-types. Many in the crowd came to see Palin rather than McCain and were unsure of whom they would vote for in the primary.

Both candidates endorsed Arizona SB 1070, the anti-illegal immigration state law passed in April 2010 that aroused national controversy, and both made tough stands on border control central to their campaigns. McCain retained a financial edge, having $4.6 million in hand at the end of the first quarter to Hayworth's $861,000.

Hayworth's campaign began to struggle when infomercials he had made in 2007 came to light, which had pitched access to free government payment programs from a company that was accused of swindling thousands of people. McCain ran television ads that labeled Hayworth a "huckster", and in return Hayworth's wife charged McCain with engaging in deliberate character assassination. Hayworth also had difficulty rallying conservative backing due to his past support for Congressional earmarks and for his past associations with lobbyist and convicted felon Jack Abramoff.

Hayworth was further harmed by stating that the United States never declared war on Germany during the Second World War, when in fact it did on December 11, 1941.

During the summer, McCain began running immigration-themed ads featuring Pinal County sheriff Paul Babeu, a strong supporter of SB 1070; however, Hayworth asked McCain to withdraw the ads because Babeu had recently appeared on the white nationalist radio show The Political Cesspool.

=== Candidates ===
- John McCain, incumbent U.S. senator
- Jim Deakin, businessman
- J. D. Hayworth, former U.S. representative

=== Polling ===
Poll source	Date(s) administered	Sample size	Margin of error	Jim Deakin	J. D. Hayworth	John McCain	Chris Simcox	Other	Undecided
Public Policy Polling (report)	September 18–21, 2009	400	± 4.5%	––	––	67%	17%	––	17%
Rasmussen Reports (report)	November 18, 2009	570	± 4.0%	––	43%	45%	4%	2%	7%
Tarrance Group (report)	December 8–10, 2009	600	± 4.1%	––	36%	56%	––	––	—
Rasmussen Reports (report)	January 20, 2010	502	± 4.5%	––	31%	53%	4%	3%	8%
Rasmussen Reports (report)	March 18, 2010	541	± 4.0%	––	41%	48%	––	3%	8%
Research 2000 (report)	March 29–31, 2010	600	± 4.0%	––	37%	52%	––	––	11%
Rasmussen Reports (report)	April 13, 2010	510	± 4.0%	––	42%	47%	––	2%	8%
Behavior Research Center (report)	April 12–25, 2010	666	± 3.5%	––	28%	54%	––	––	18%
Rasmussen Reports (report)	May 17, 2010	541	± 4.5%	––	40%	52%	––	2%	6%
Rasmussen Reports (report)	June 16, 2010	707	± 4.0%	7%	36%	47%	––	1%	8%
Magellan Strategies (report)	June 22, 2010	1,139	± 2.9%	––	29%	52%	––	14%	5%
Behavior Research Strategies (report)	June 30 – July 11, 2010	524	± 4.4%	5%	19%	64%	––	—	12%
Rasmussen Reports (report)	July 21, 2010	595	± 4.0%	––	34%	54%	––	7%	6%

=== Endorsements ===
John McCain

U.S. executive branch officials

- William Bennett, former U.S. Secretary of Education, former director of the Office of National Drug Control Policy, and host of the conservative radio talk show The William Bennett Show

Governors

- Jan Brewer, governor of Arizona
- Jeb Bush, former governor of Florida and brother of former U.S. president George W. Bush
- Jane Dee Hull, former governor of Arizona
- Bob McDonnell, governor of Virginia
- Sarah Palin, former governor of Alaska and McCain's running mate in 2008
- Tim Pawlenty, governor of Minnesota
- Mitt Romney, former governor of Massachusetts and candidate for President in 2008
- Fife Symington, former governor of Arizona

U.S. Senators

- Scott Brown, U.S. senator of Massachusetts
- Jon Kyl, U.S. senator of Arizona
- Fred Thompson, former U.S. senator of Tennessee

U.S. Representatives

- Jeff Flake, U.S. representative of Arizona
- Trent Franks, U.S. representative of Arizona
- Jim Kolbe, former U.S. representative of Arizona
- Matt Salmon, former U.S. representative of Arizona
- John Shadegg, U.S. representative of Arizona

State legislators

- Andy Tobin, Arizona state representative

Organizations

- Arizona Fraternal Order of Police
- U.S. Chamber of Commerce
- NRA Political Victory Fund

Individuals

- Steve Forbes, editor-in-chief of Forbes magazine and former presidential candidate
- Luis Gonzalez, former outfielder for the Arizona Diamondbacks
- Michael Medved, host of the radio talk-show The Michael Medved Show
- Grover Norquist, tax-reform activist
J. D. Hayworth

U.S. Representatives

- Dana Rohrabacher, U.S. representative of California

State legislators

- State Senate Majority Leader Chuck Gray
- State Senator Russell Pearce
- State Senator Ron Gould

County officials

- Joe Arpaio, sheriff of Maricopa County, Arizona

Organizations

- Arizona Police Association
- Gun Owners of America
- National Association of Police Organizations
- National Border Patrol Council Local 2544
- Phoenix Law Enforcement Association

Individuals

- Mark Levin, host of the conservative radio talk show The Mark Levin Show
- Michelle Malkin, conservative journalist and writer
- Robert Stacy McCain, conservative journalist and writer and McCain's cousin
- Jay A. Nenninger, anti-abortion activist, president and executive director of Arizona Right to Life
- Michael Savage, host of the conservative radio talk show The Savage Nation
- Douglas R. Scott Jr., anti-abortion activist, president of Life Decisions International
- Chris Simcox, founder of Minuteman Civil Defense Corps and former candidate who withdrew from the campaign
- Orly Taitz, controversial Obama eligibility lawyer and dentist [Warning:possible malware and redirecting]
Jim Deakin

Individuals

- Roger Boone, leader of 200-member Flagstaff, Arizona Tea Party Patriots

=== Results ===
Results by county: McCain—60–70% McCain—50–60% McCain—40–50%

Republican primary results
Party	Candidate	Votes	%
Republican	John McCain (incumbent)	284,374	56.2%
Republican	J. D. Hayworth	162,502	32.1%
Republican	Jim Deakin	59,447	11.7%
Total votes		506,323	100.0%

== Democratic primary ==
=== Background ===
Many considered popular Democratic governor Janet Napolitano a possible Democratic challenger to McCain, and some very early polling showed her ahead or competitive with him in a prospective 2010 matchup. Napolitano was term-limited as governor in 2010, and had openly discussed the possibility of a Senate race, especially given McCain's 2008 electoral results in the Democratic-trending state.

However, Napolitano was nominated by President-elect Barack Obama to be the new Secretary of Homeland Security on December 1, 2008, making it appear unlikely that she would challenge McCain.

In February 2009, Arizona Senate minority leader Jorge Luis Garcia was saying: "There hasn't been any discussion about any [candidates]. The Democratic Party would be willing to lend support to a candidate against Senator McCain. It would be very expensive—very, very, very expensive." In April 2009, only one person had announced a candidacy, Rudy Garcia, the former mayor of Bell Gardens, California. In October 2009, national Democratic leaders were saying that they were not bothering to recruit anyone to face McCain, but that same month, Tucson Councilman Rodney Glassman filed an exploratory committee for this Senate seat at the urging of Arizona Attorney General and Arizona gubernatorial candidate Terry Goddard.

Other possible Democratic challengers mentioned included Phoenix mayor Phil Gordon, U.S. Congresswoman Gabby Giffords, and Terry Goddard. However, Goddard had formally announced his candidacy for the 2010 Arizona gubernatorial race, and Phil Gordon was exploring a run for John Shadegg's Congressional seat in Arizona's 3rd district.

=== Candidates ===
- Rodney Glassman, Tucson city councilman
- John Dougherty, former investigative reporter for Phoenix New Times
- Cathy Eden, former state legislator and an aide to governors Rose Mofford and Janet Napolitano
- Randy Parraz, civil rights and labor activist, attorney

=== Polling ===
Poll source	Date(s) administered	Sample size	Margin of error	John Dougherty	Cathy Eden	Rodney Glassman	Randy Parraz	Other	Undecided
Rasmussen Reports (report)	June 16, 2010	342	± 5.0%	8%	11%	12%	9%	14%	46%
Rasmussen Reports (report)	July 21, 2010	331	± 5.5%	7%	11%	15%	10%	10%	47%

=== Debates ===
Debates were planned for:

- Friday, July 9, 2010, in Phoenix, to be televised on KTVK Channel 3
- Wednesday, July 21, 2010, in Yuma, to be radio broadcast on NPR's Yuma affiliate, KAWC
- Thursday, August 5, 2010, in Tucson, to be televised on KUAT

=== Results ===
Results by county: Glassman—40–50% Glassman—30–40% Glassman—20–30% Eden—30–40% Eden—20–30% Parraz—30–40%

Democratic primary results
Party	Candidate	Votes	%
Democratic	Rodney Glassman	86,881	34.7%
Democratic	Cathy Eden	66,421	26.5%
Democratic	John Dougherty	60,262	24.1%
Democratic	Randy Parraz	36,637	14.6%
Total votes		250,201	100.0%

== General election ==
=== Candidates ===
- Rodney Glassman (D), city councilor of Tucson
- Jerry Joslyn (G), businessman
- John McCain (R), incumbent U.S. senator
- David Nolan (L), former chairman of the Libertarian Party and inventor of the Nolan Chart

=== Campaign ===
After spending over $20 million during the primaries, McCain still had more than $1 million in cash on hand after the primary election. Glassman criticized McCain on women's issues. In August 2010, Glassman released a TV advertisement called "Arizona First."

=== Debates ===
- September 26: All four candidates on KTVK-TV in Phoenix. It ran without commercial interruption from 6pm to 7pm.

=== Predictions ===
Source	Ranking	As of
Cook Political Report	Solid R	October 26, 2010
Rothenberg	Safe R	October 22, 2010
RealClearPolitics	Safe R	October 26, 2010
Sabato's Crystal Ball	Safe R	October 21, 2010
CQ Politics	Safe R	October 26, 2010

=== Polling ===
Poll source	Date(s) administered	Sample size	Margin of error	Rodney Glassman	John McCain	Other	Undecided
Public Policy Polling	September 18–21, 2009	617	± 3.9%	25%	55%	––	20%
Research 2000	March 29–31, 2010	600	± 4.0%	33%	52%	––	13%
Rasmussen Reports	April 13, 2010	500	± 4.5%	32%	54%	8%	6%
Public Policy Polling	April 23–25, 2010	813	± 3.4%	33%	49%	––	13%
Behavior Research Center	April 12–25, 2010	666	± 3.5%	24%	46%	––	30%
Rasmussen Reports	May 17, 2010	1,000	± 3.0%	28%	57%	9%	7%
Rasmussen Reports	July 29, 2010	500	± 4.5%	34%	53%	11%	3%
Rasmussen Reports	August 25, 2010	500	± 4.5%	31%	53%	10%	6%
Rasmussen Reports	September 7, 2010	500	± 4.5%	37%	51%	7%	6%
Rasmussen Reports	October 4, 2010	750	± 4.0%	33%	54%	8%	6%
Public Policy Polling	October 23–24, 2010	664	± 3.8%	38%	56%	––	6%
Rasmussen Reports	October 28, 2010	500	± 4.5%	32%	52%	9%	7%

Hypothetical polling

Poll Source	Date(s) administered	Sample size	Margin of error	Republican nominee		Democratic nominee			Other	Undecided
Poll Source	Date(s) administered	Sample size	Margin of error	J. D. Hayworth (R)	John McCain (R)	Bruce Babbitt (D)	Gabby Giffords (D)	Rodney Glassman (D)	Other	Undecided
Public Policy Polling (report)	September 18–21, 2009	617	± 3.9%	—	57%	—	30%	—	—	13%
Public Policy Polling (report)	September 18–21, 2009	617	± 3.9%	—	55%	—	—	25%	—	20%
Research 2000 (report)	March 29–31, 2010	600	± 4.0%	43%	—	42%	—	—	—	15%
Research 2000 (report)	March 29–31, 2010	600	± 4.0%	48%	—	—	36%	—	—	15%
Research 2000 (report)	March 29–31, 2010	600	± 4.0%	49%	—	—	—	37%	—	15%
Research 2000 (report)	March 29–31, 2010	600	± 4.0%	—	48%	42%	—	—	—	10%
Research 2000 (report)	March 29–31, 2010	600	± 4.0%	—	52%	—	34%	—	—	15%
Research 2000 (report)	March 29–31, 2010	600	± 4.0%	—	53%	—	—	33%	—	13%
Rasmussen Reports (report)	April 13, 2010	500	± 4.5%	—	54%	—	—	32%	8%	6%
Rasmussen Reports (report)	April 13, 2010	500	± 4.5%	48%	—	—	—	39%	7%	7%
Public Policy Polling (report)	April 23–25, 2010	813	± 3.4%	49%	—	—	33%	—	—	13%
Public Policy Polling (report)	April 23–25, 2010	813	± 3.4%	39%	—	—	—	42%	—	19%
Behavior Research Center (report)	April 12–25, 2010	666	± 3.5%	—	46%	—	—	24%	—	30%
Behavior Research Center (report)	April 12–25, 2010	666	± 3.5%	37%	—	—	—	30%	—	33%
Rasmussen Reports (report)	May 17, 2010	1,000	± 3.0%	—	57%	—	—	28%	9%	7%
Rasmussen Reports (report)	May 17, 2010	1,000	± 3.0%	49%	—	—	—	33%	9%	9%
Rasmussen Reports ()	July 29, 2010	500	± 4.5%	—	53%	—	—	34%	11%	3%
Rasmussen Reports ()	July 29, 2010	500	± 4.5%	38%	—	—	—	43%	13%	6%

=== Fundraising ===
Candidate (party)	Receipts	Disbursements	Cash on hand	Debt
John McCain (R)	$20,077,490	$11,868,523	$472,777	$27,999
Rodney Glassman (D)	$1,366,612	$1,087,161	$279,450	$500,000
Source: Federal Election Commission

=== Results ===
2010 United States Senate election in Arizona
Party	Candidate	Votes	%	±%
Republican	John McCain (incumbent)	1,005,615	59.07%	−17.67%
Democratic	Rodney Glassman	592,011	34.78%	+14.16%
Libertarian	David Nolan	80,097	4.71%	+2.07%
Green	Jerry Joslyn	24,603	1.45%	N/A
Majority		413,604	24.30%	−14.45%
Total votes		1,702,326	100.0%	
Republican hold				

By county

County	Rodney Glassman Democratic		John McCain Republican		Others	
County	#	%	#	%	#	%
Apache	11,785	57.2%	7,371	35.8%	1,444	7.0%
Cochise	13,119	33.0%	23,445	59.0%	3,176	8.0%
Coconino	17,164	44.3%	18,995	49.1%	2,550	6.6%
Gila	4,858	27.4%	11,500	64.9%	1,366	7.8%
Graham	2,194	24.2%	6,223	68.5%	667	7.3%
Greenlee	947	39.1%	1,321	54.6%	153	6.4%
La Paz	1,085	24.2%	3,003	67.0%	393	8.8%
Maricopa	319,012	32.5%	599,068	61.0%	64,741	6.5%
Mohave	12,302	23.0%	36,367	68.0%	4,812	9.0%
Navajo	10,737	36.7%	16,157	55.2%	2,394	8.2%
Pima	134,296	43.0%	158,879	50.8%	19,424	6.2%
Pinal	24,856	31.8%	47,850	61.3%	5,364	7.0%
Santa Cruz	5,710	57.6%	3,693	37.2%	513	5.3%
Yavapai	21,636	26.9%	52,093	64.7%	6,735	8.4%
Yuma	12,310	36.3%	19,650	57.9%	1,976	5.8%
Totals	592,011	34.7%	1,005,615	58.9%	110,858	6.5%

Counties that flipped from Republican to Democratic

- Apache (largest municipality: Eagar)
- Santa Cruz (largest municipality: Nogales)
