= Murders of Raul and Brisenia Flores =

Father and daughter murdered in Arivaca, Arizona, U.S.

- Raul and Brisenia Flores
- Location: Arivaca, Arizona, U.S.
- Date: 30 May 2009; 5 a.m. (UTC-7)
- Attack type: Armed robbery; Home invasion; Premeditated murder
- Weapon: Firearm
- Deaths: 2
- Injuries: 2 (including one attacker)
- Perpetrators: Jason Eugene Bush; Shawna Forde; Albert Gaxiola

On May 30, 2009, 29-year-old Raul Flores Jr. and his daughter, nine-year-old Brisenia Ylianna Flores, were murdered during a home invasion in Arivaca, Arizona. The perpetrators were Shawna Forde, Jason Eugene Bush and Albert Gaxiola, all members of Forde's vigilante and white-supremacist nativist group, Minutemen American Defense (MAD), which split from Minutemen Civil Defense Corps after Forde was expelled. Gina Gonzalez, the victims' wife and mother, was wounded but survived the attack after exchanging gunfire with the intruders, wounding Bush.

In 2011, all three assailants were convicted of murder. Forde and Bush were sentenced to death, while Gaxiola was sentenced to life in prison without parole.

== Attack ==
Shawna Forde and her accomplices gained entry into the Flores home by claiming they were officials looking for fugitives. The suspects had the expectation of finding money and drugs that could be sold to finance Forde's vigilante and nativist group, Minutemen American Defense (MAD), which patrolled Arizona's border with Mexico. When they found no drugs, the intruders took inexpensive jewelry and fatally shot 29-year-old Raul Flores Jr. and his daughter, nine-year-old Brisenia Ylianna Flores.

Gina Marie Gonzalez, the 31-year-old wife of Raul Flores and the mother of Brisenia, was in the home during the attack and was shot three times. She survived when she pretended to be dead. After the assailants left the home, Gonzalez called 9-1-1 and armed herself with her husband's handgun. While Gonzalez was on the phone, the assailants re-entered the home, and Gonzalez exchanged fire with the attackers, wounding Bush in the leg. The killers then fled. Gonzalez identified two men and a white woman as the attackers. She identified Bush as the one who had murdered her daughter and her husband. The day after the murders, Bush's leg was treated by MAD member Chuck Stonex. Stonex later become a witness for the prosecution at trial.

An early exchange within the 911 call was recorded as follows:

Gonzalez: They shot me and I pretended like I was dead. My daughter was crying. They shot her, too.

Operator: Are they still there, the people who, that shot them?

Gonzalez: They're coming back in! They're coming back in!

(Gunfire.)

Brisenia was a third-grade student at the Sopori Elementary School in Amado, Arizona, at the time of her death. Another of the Floreses' daughters, a 12-year-old, was at her grandmother's home in Sahuarita during the attack.

== Trial ==
Arriving at a death sentence for Forde was difficult, according to juror Angie Thomas. A picture of Brisenia presented during the trial was a significant factor in reaching the decision: "A little girl, with bright red fingernails; she's wearing a white T-shirt and turquoise-colored pajama bottoms. She's on a love seat. It's a perfect, innocent picture until you realize that half of her face has been blown off." Gonzalez testified that her daughter was shot point-blank as the girl pleaded for her life.

Forde, Bush, and Albert Gaxiola were all convicted of the murders.

== Assailants ==
=== Jason Eugene Bush ===
Jason Bush

Jason Eugene "Gunny" Bush (born LaGrande, Oregon August 11, 1974 (age 52)) of Meadview, Arizona, was MAD's National Director of Operations. Bush had previously been charged with the September 1997 execution-style killing of an Aryan Nation associate, Jonathan Bumstead, for supposedly committing the "crime" of "being a 'race-traitor'". That same year, Bush was imprisoned for car theft and for possession of a firearm, which was unlawful because of Bush's earlier felony conviction.

After his release from prison in 2003, Bush moved to Sandpoint, Idaho, where he lived until 2007. He is suspected in two additional killings that occurred in 1997. According to information provided to Washington State detectives, Bush is alleged to have shown up at the homes of acquaintances covered in blood and asked to be allowed to clean up, after he had "just finished taking care of some business." Detectives sought to find links to unresolved cases.

Bush, who was Forde's second-in-command, had ties to Aryan Nations, a white supremacist organization. After his arrest in the murders of Raul and Brisenia Flores, Bush was charged in June 2009 with the 1997 murder of Hector Lopez Partida in Wenatchee, Washington after being linked via DNA evidence. In April 2011, Bush was sentenced to death, and in May 2011, received another 78 years for other crimes.

=== Shawna Forde ===
Shawna Forde

Shawna Forde was born December 6, 1967 (age 58). In describing herself in 2007 when she ran unsuccessfully for a city council seat in Everett, Washington, Forde said that she had been a promoter of a grunge rock band and had worked as a youth counselor, aircraft factory worker, and as a cosmetologist.

Forde had several run-ins with law enforcement before her arrest for the double murder. Court records show that she served time in juvenile lock-ups for repeated convictions involving theft, burglary, and prostitution. Forde had been married four times. In 1989, a male friend sought court protection from Forde, claiming that she had physically attacked him and threatened to hurt herself with a knife. In 2007, she was charged with theft. In January 2008, Forde accused members of a drug cartel of sexually assaulting and shooting her. Later, however, she suggested the culprits were criminal associates of her son. Forde's brother alleged that she fabricated the story, and authorities closed the case due to insufficient evidence.

In 2007, Forde became involved in vigilante activities after she joined the Minutemen Civil Defense Corps (MCDC), which eventually expelled her. In February 2007, she helped found and direct MAD, a splinter group from the MCDC, which questionably claimed "several thousand private members", although a former member claimed only fourteen remained following Forde's arrest for the Flores murders. Forde was posting updates to the website of Jim Gilchrist's Minuteman Project organization, which had her listed as their Border Operations Manager. Stonex said Forde intended to fund the purchase of a 40-acre (16 ha) property in southern Arizona, where she had intended to establish a base for her group's border operations.

On February 14, 2011, Forde was found guilty of all eight counts for which she was prosecuted: including two counts of the first-degree murder of Raul and Brisenia, one count of attempted first-degree murder of Gina Gonzalez, two counts of aggravated assault and one count each of burglary, armed robbery, and aggravated robbery. Forde's lawyer, Eric Larsen, had said that Forde was not in the house when Flores and his daughter were murdered, so she should not be found guilty. Prosecutors said Forde was with the two men who broke into the Flores' home, and Gonzalez testified she was there. Pima County Deputy County Attorney Rick Unklesbay said, "She didn't put a gun to Brisenia's head ... but she was the one in charge. Because of that, you must hold her accountable."

Pima County Sheriff Clarence Dupnik said that Forde planned and ordered the murder of Raul Flores. Although Gonzalez did not pick Forde out of a police lineup, police found Forde in possession of Gonzalez's jewelry, including her wedding ring, during a search after Forde's arrest. Police also presented text messages sent through Forde's phone and recorded conversations between Forde and the other suspects. The prosecutor said Forde had planned the crime for months in meetings out-of-state. "Even if she didn't pull the trigger … make no mistake about it. She's the one who planned the events. She's the one who recruited people to do this", Unklesbay said. On February 22, 2011, a Tucson jury convicted Forde of both murders and sentenced her to death. She is one of three women out of 116 inmates on Arizona's death row.

=== Albert Gaxiola ===
Albert Gaxiola

Albert Robert Gaxiola (born February 9, 1967 (age 59)), of Arivaca, Arizona, is believed to have provided intelligence about drug activities in the area to the M.A.D. Gaxiola had been imprisoned on marijuana charges from 1992 to 2000. Gaxiola was found guilty of the murders and sentenced to life without parole plus 54 years.

== See also ==
- Domestic terrorism – Local terrorism, without foreign support
- Mexican drug war – War between Mexico's government and various drug trafficking syndicates
- List of murdered American children
- List of serial killers in the United States

== Bibliography ==
- Neiwert, David (March 2013). And Hell Followed With Her: Crossing the Dark Side of the American Border. Nation Books. p. 336.
- Rosenthal, Lawrence; Trost, Christine (July 15, 2012). Steep: The Precipitous Rise of the Tea Party. University of California Press. p. 93.
- Zeskind, Leonard. Blood and Politics: The History of the White Nationalist Movement from the Margins to the Mainstream.
