= 2005 United States House of Representatives elections =

Special elections in the 109th US Congress

- March 8, 2005 – December 7, 2005

3 of the 435 seats in the U.S. House of Representatives 218 seats needed for a majority
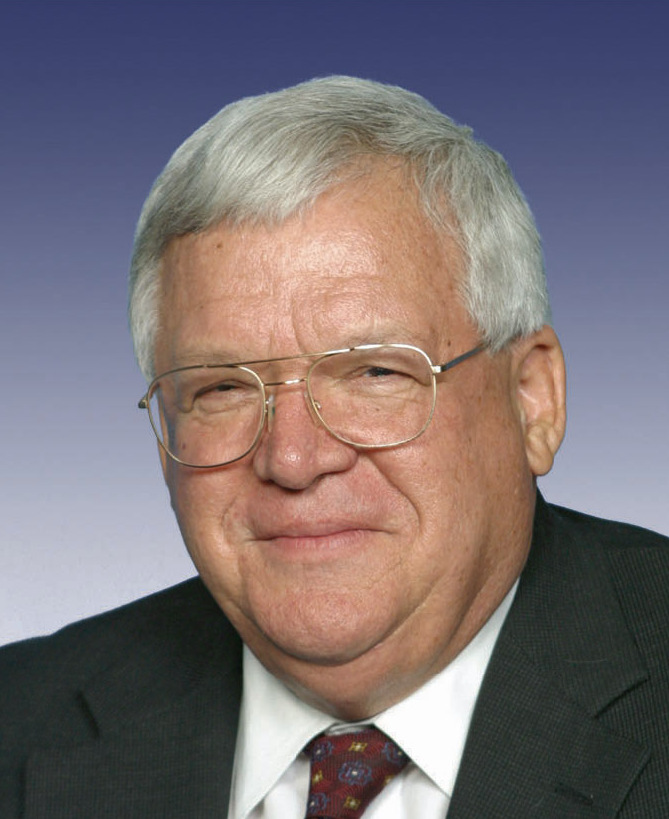

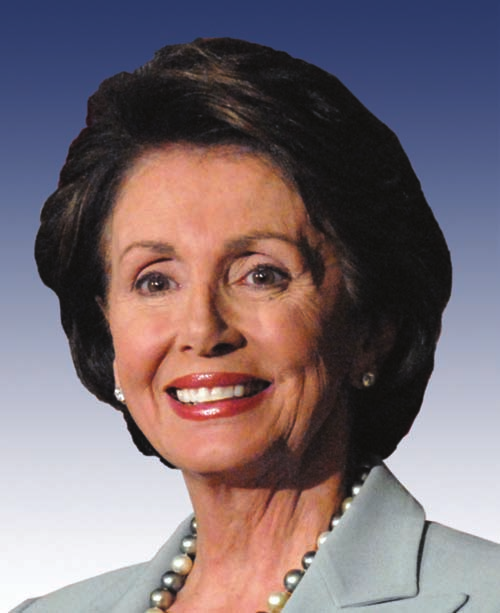
	Majority party	Minority party
Leader	Dennis Hastert	Nancy Pelosi
Party	Republican	Democratic
Leader since	January 3, 1999	January 3, 2003
Leader's seat	Illinois 14th	California 8th
Last election	232	202
Seats won	2	1
Seat change	Steady	Steady
Popular vote	120,009	148,523
Percentage	40.03%	49.54%
	Third party
Party	American Independent
Last election	0
Seats won	0
Seat change	Steady
Popular vote	26,507
Percentage	8.84%

There were three special elections to the United States House of Representatives in 2005 during the 109th United States Congress.

== Summary ==
Elections are listed by date and district.

District	Incumbent			This race	
District	Member	Party	First elected	Results	Candidates
California 5	Bob Matsui	Democratic	1978	Incumbent won reelection, but died January 1, 2005 at the end of the previous Congress. New member elected March 8, 2005. Democratic hold.	▌ ✓ Doris Matsui (Democratic) 70.00%; ▌Julie Padilla (Democratic) 8.92%; ▌John Thomas Flynn (Republican) 8.17%; ▌Serge Chernay (Republican) 4.66%; Others: ▌P. Michael O'Brien (Republican) 2.18%; ▌Shane Singh (Republican) 1.40%; ▌Bruce Stevens (Republican) 1.22%; ▌Pat Driscoll (Green) 1.14%; ▌Leonard Padilla (Independent) 0.82%; ▌Chuck Pineda (Democratic) 0.56%; ▌Gale Morgan (Libertarian) 0.56%; ▌John C. Reiger (Peace and Freedom) 0.36%
Ohio 2	Rob Portman	Republican	1992	Incumbent resigned April 29, 2005 to become U.S. Trade Representative. New member elected August 2, 2005. Republican hold.	▌ ✓ Jean Schmidt (Republican) 51.63%; ▌Paul Hackett (Democratic) 48.35%
California 48	Christopher Cox	Republican	2002	Incumbent resigned August 2, 2005 to become Chairman of the SEC. New member elected December 7, 2005. Republican hold.	▌ ✓ John Campbell (Republican) 44.43%; ▌Steve Young (Democratic) 27.76%; ▌Jim Gilchrist (American Independent) 25.50%; ▌Béa Tomaselli Tiritilli (Green) 1.38%; ▌Bruce Cohen (Libertarian) 0.94%

== California's 5th congressional district ==
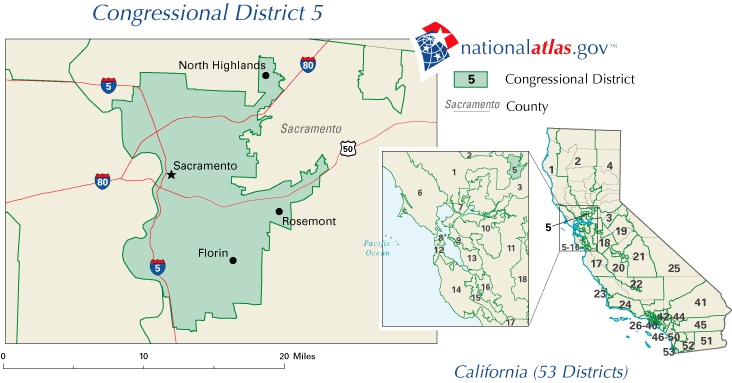
California's 5th congressional district

This special election was held on March 8, 2005, following the death of incumbent representative Bob Matsui from pneumonia. His wife Doris Matsui was elected, getting 70% of the vote.

2005 California's 5th congressional district special election
Party	Candidate	Votes	%
Democratic	Doris Matsui	56,175	70.00
Democratic	Julie Padilla	7,158	8.92
Republican	John Thomas Flynn	6,559	8.17
Republican	Serge Chernay	3,742	4.66
Republican	P. Michael O'Brien	1,753	2.18
Republican	Shane Singh	1,124	1.40
Republican	Bruce Stevens	976	1.22
Green	Pat Driscoll	916	1.14
Independent	Leonard Padilla	659	0.82
Democratic	Chuck Pineda	451	0.56
Libertarian	Gale Morgan	451	0.56
Peace and Freedom	John C. Reiger	286	0.36
Majority		49,017	61.08
Total votes		83,033	100.00
Turnout			12.56
Democratic hold			

== Ohio's 2nd congressional district ==
2005 Ohio's 2nd congressional district election
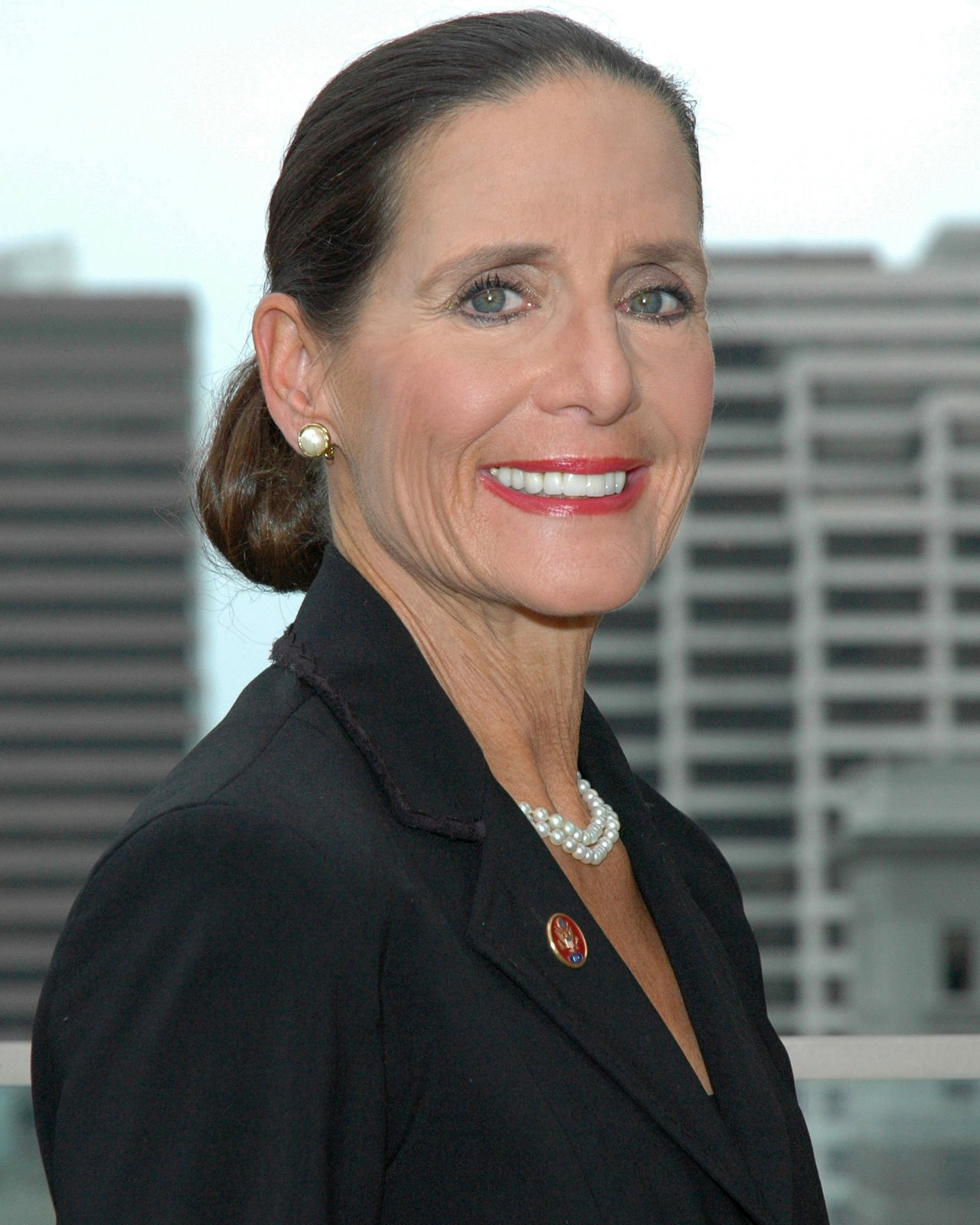

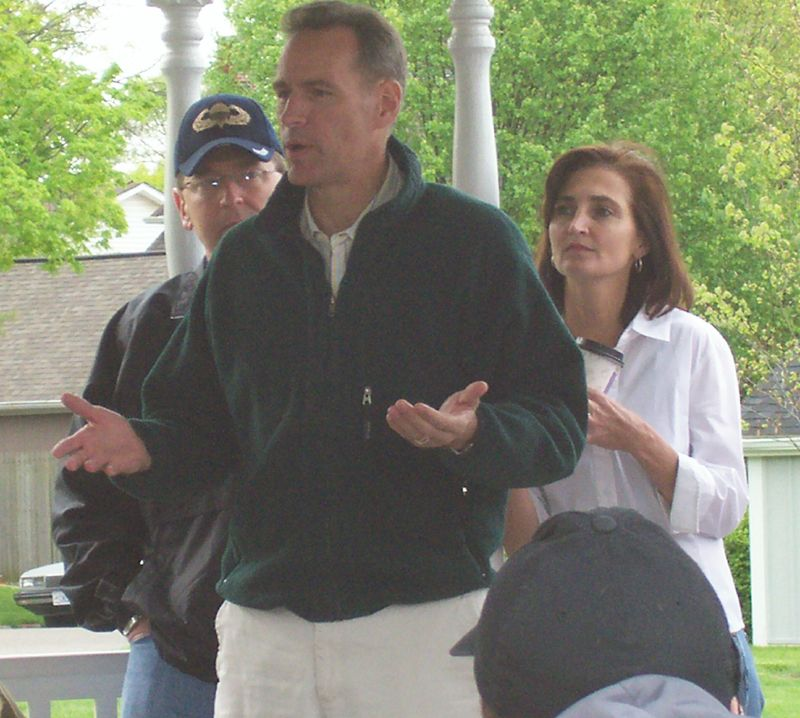
Nominee	Jean Schmidt	Paul Hackett
Party	Republican	Democratic
Popular vote	59,671	55,886
Percentage	51.6%	48.4%
- Results by county Schmidt: 50–60% Hackett: 50–60% 60–70%
U.S. Representative before election
Rob Portman
Republican
Elected U.S. Representative
Jean Schmidt
Republican

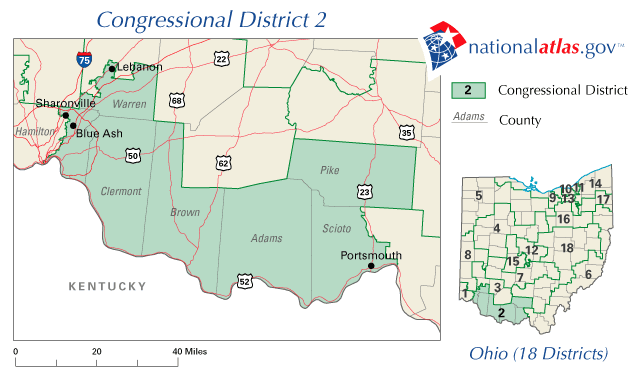
Ohio's 2nd congressional district

This special election took place on August 2, 2005, to fill the seat left by former Representative Rob Portman, who resigned to become the United States Trade Representative. The district is located in southwestern Ohio, encompassing parts of Cincinnati and its suburbs. Republican Jean Schmidt won the election, succeeding Portman and maintaining the Republican representation in the district.

2005 Ohio's 2nd congressional district special election
Party	Candidate	Votes	%
Republican	Jean Schmidt	59,671	51.63
Democratic	Paul Hackett	55,886	48.35
Write-in		19	0.02
Majority		3,785	3.27
Total votes		115,576	100.00
Turnout			18.32
Republican hold			

== California's 48th congressional district ==
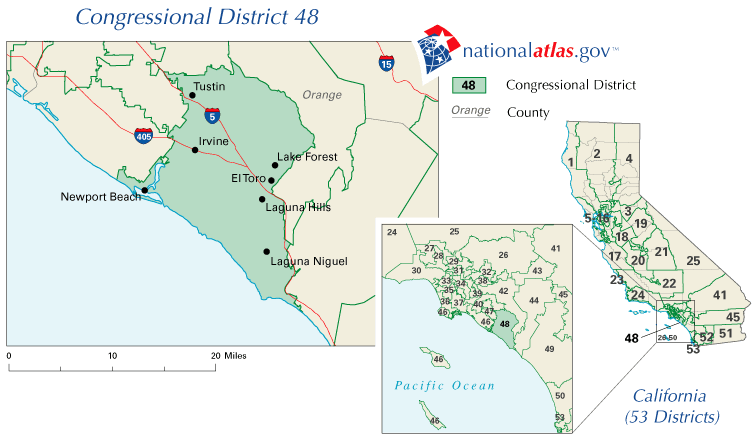
California's 48th congressional district

This special election occurred on October 4, 2005, following the resignation of Representative Christopher Cox, who left his seat to become the Chairman of the U.S. Securities and Exchange Commission. The district covers parts of Orange County and had been consistently held by Republicans. John Campbell, a Republican, emerged victorious in the election, preserving the Republican control of the district.

2005 California's 48th congressional district special election
Party	Candidate	Votes	%
Republican	John Campbell	46,184	44.43
Democratic	Steve Young	28,853	27.76
American Independent	Jim Gilchrist	26,507	25.50
Green	Béa Tomaselli Tiritilli	1,430	1.38
Libertarian	Bruce Cohen	974	0.94
Majority		17,331	16.67
Total votes		103,948	100.00
Turnout			16.27
Republican hold			
