= Marilyn Brewer =

American politician (born 1937)

Marilyn C. Brewer

Member of the California State Assembly from the 70th district
- In office December 5, 1994 - November 30, 2000
- Preceded by: Gil Ferguson
- Succeeded by: John B. T. Campbell III

Personal details
- Born: May 26, 1937 (age 89) Monessen, Pennsylvania, U.S.
- Party: Republican
- Spouse: Charles
- Children: 4
- Education: Fullerton College

Marilyn C. Brewer (born May 26, 1937) is a California politician who served from 1994 to 2000 as a California State Assemblywoman representing southern Orange County's 70th District.

Born in western Pennsylvania, Brewer earned her Associate's degree from Fullerton College in 1983. She served as an aide to Orange County supervisor Tom Riley until her election to the State Assembly.

In 1994 she ran for an open seat in the California State Assembly representing Newport Beach. Her two more conservative rivals in the GOP primary, Irvine city councilman Barry Hammond and attorney Tom Reinecke (son former California Lt. Gov. Ed Reinecke) split the conservative vote, allowing the more moderate Brewer to win the primary. In the general election she received 71.7% of the vote .

In the State Assembly, Brewer served as Vice Chair of the Appropriations and Insurance Committees. She was also a member of the Rules, Human Services, Transportation, Governmental Organization, and Labor/Employment committees.

She was reelected twice more in 1996(61.5%) & 1998 (95.7% with only opposition from a Natural Law Party candidate) before California term limits of three terms in the State Assembly led to her leaving the state house in 2000.

In 2005 Brewer ran in a special election for California's 48th congressional district left vacant after incumbent Congressman Christopher Cox resigned to become Chairman of the U.S. Securities and Exchange Commission. Brewer lost the nomination to State Senator John Campbell by a 28% margin, but did beat eight other Republicans in the primary election. Although she won the endorsement of John McCain, the Republican party chose to officially endorse Campbell after Brewer began to court independents and Democrats. The American Independent Party candidate, Minuteman Project founder Jim Gilchrist, fell only 2.3% short of overtaking Brewer in the open primary.

In October 2006, California Governor Arnold Schwarzenegger appointed Brewer to serve as a member of the "Little Hoover Commission".

== See also ==
- 2005 California's 48th congressional district special election

California Assembly
Preceded by Gil Ferguson	California State Assemblymember; 70th District; December 5, 1994–November 30, 2000	Succeeded by John Campbell
