= Jason Todd (disambiguation) =

Jason Todd is a character appearing in comic books and media published by DC Comics.

Jason Todd may also refer to:

- Jason Todd Ipson
- Jason Todd Ready
- "Jason Todd" (Titans episode)
- Jason Todd (Titans character)
