= 2008 United States presidential election in Arizona =

- November 4, 2008
- Turnout: 77.69% ▲

Nominee	John McCain	Barack Obama
Party	Republican	Democratic
Home state	Arizona	Illinois
Running mate	Sarah Palin	Joe Biden
Electoral vote	10	0
Popular vote	1,230,111	1,034,707
Percentage	53.39%	44.91%

McCain
40–50%
50–60%
60–70%
70–80%
80–90%
90–100%
Obama
40–50%
50–60%
60–70%
70–80%
80–90%
90–100%
Tie/No Data
President before election
George W. Bush
Republican
Elected President
Barack Obama
Democratic

The 2008 United States presidential election in Arizona took place on November 4, 2008, and was part of the 2008 United States presidential election. Voters chose 10 representatives, or electors to the Electoral College, who voted for president and vice president.

Arizona was won by Republican nominee and native son John McCain with an 8.48% margin of victory over Democrat Barack Obama. McCain had served as United States Senator from the state since 1987, and enjoyed high approval ratings. Prior to the election, sixteen of seventeen news organizations considered this a state McCain would win, or a red state. Some polls taken near Election Day in 2008 showed Democrat Barack Obama closer than expected to winning it, but these did not come to fruition, as McCain won Arizona by high-single digits and carried all but four of the state's 15 counties. Nonetheless, this was closer than any of McCain's Senate victories and was a smaller margin than Bush's 10.5% margin 4 years earlier.

Obama became the first Democrat to win the White House without winning Gila, Greenlee, La Paz, or Pinal Counties since Arizona statehood in 1912, as well as the first to do so without winning Navajo County since Lyndon B. Johnson in 1964.

Arizona was one of only two states that voted against Obama in both 2008 and 2012 that his vice president Joe Biden would go on to win in 2020, the other being Georgia.

== Primaries ==
- 2008 Arizona Democratic primary
- 2008 Arizona Republican primary

== Campaign ==
=== Predictions ===
There were 16 news organizations who made state-by-state predictions of the election. Here are their last predictions before election day:

Source	Ranking
D.C. Political Report	Likely R
Cook Political Report	Lean R
The Takeaway	Lean R
Electoral-vote.com	Lean R
Washington Post	Lean R
Politico	Solid R
RealClearPolitics	Toss-up
FiveThirtyEight	Solid R
CQ Politics	Lean R
The New York Times	Solid R
CNN	Lean R
NPR	Lean R
MSNBC	Lean R
Fox News	Likely R
Associated Press	Likely R
Rasmussen Reports	Safe R

=== Polling ===
Opinion polls taken from February through to October 2008 showed McCain leading Obama by margins of between 1% and 21%. The final RealClearPolitics average gave the state an average of 53.8% for McCain, compared to 45.0% for Obama.

=== Fundraising ===
John McCain raised $7,448,622. Barack Obama raised $5,491,056.

=== Advertising and visits ===
Obama and his interest groups spent $1,510,900 in the state. McCain and his interest groups spent just $751. The Democratic ticket did not visit the state. Arizona native John McCain visited the state 5 times in the election campaign.

== Analysis ==
Arizona has long been a Republican-dominated state. At the time, it was represented in the Senate by two Republicans (John McCain and Jon Kyl). After 1948, Arizona did not vote Democratic in a presidential race again until 1996, after which it did not vote Democrat again until 2020. In addition, both the Arizona Senate and Arizona House of Representatives are controlled by Republicans. However, the Governor was Democrat Janet Napolitano, and both parties held four House seats each before the election.

Arizona was McCain's home state and gave its 10 electoral votes to its favorite son. However, he won just under 54% of the vote. By comparison, he'd been reelected in 2004 with 77% of the vote, one of the largest margins of victory for a statewide race in Arizona history. This led to speculation that the race would have been far closer without McCain on the ballot. One major factor is the growing Hispanic vote in the state, a voting bloc that tends to favor the Democrats, although both George W. Bush and John McCain held moderate positions on illegal immigration.

Arizona politics are dominated by Maricopa and Pima counties, home to Phoenix and Tucson respectively. Between them, these two counties cast almost three-fourths of the state's vote and elect a substantial majority of the legislature. Maricopa County, a Republican stronghold since 1948, gave McCain an 11-point victory. This alone was more than enough to make up for Obama's narrow victory in Democratic-leaning Tucson. McCain also did well elsewhere throughout the state, winning the more sparsely populated counties by double digits.

The election also saw Republicans making gains in the state legislature, as the GOP picked up one seat in the State Senate and three seats in the State House. The Democrats, however, managed to win the open seat in Arizona's 1st congressional district, with former state representative Ann Kirkpatrick cruising to victory over Republican Sydney Hay, giving the Democrats a majority of the state's House seats for the first time in 60 years.

== Results ==
Constitution Party nominee Chuck Baldwin, Boston Tea Party nominee Charles Jay and independent candidate Jonathan Allen were registered write-in candidates in Arizona.

Party	Candidate	Running mate	Votes	Percentage	Electoral votes
Republican	John McCain	Sarah Palin	1,230,111	53.39%	10
Democratic	Barack Obama	Joe Biden	1,034,707	44.91%	0
Libertarian	Bob Barr	Wayne Allyn Root	12,555	0.54%	0
Independent	Ralph Nader	Matt Gonzalez	11,301	0.49%	0
Green	Cynthia McKinney	Rosa Clemente	3,406	0.15%	0
Constitution	Chuck Baldwin (write-in)	Darrell Castle	1,371	0.06%	0
Independent	Charles Jay (write-in)	Barry Hess	16	0.00%	0
Independent	Jonathan Allen (write-in)	Jeffrey Stath	8	0.00%	0
Invalid or blank votes			27,376	1.18%	—
Totals			2,320,851	100.00%	10
Voter turnout					77.69%
^{Source:}

=== By county ===
County	John McCain Republican		Barack Obama Democratic		Various candidates Other parties		Margin		Total
County	#	%	#	%	#	%	#	%	Total
Apache	8,551	35.11%	15,390	63.19%	414	1.70%	-6,839	-28.08%	24,355
Cochise	29,026	59.14%	18,943	38.60%	1,112	2.27%	10,083	20.54%	49,081
Coconino	22,186	40.65%	31,433	57.59%	964	1.77%	-9,247	-16.94%	54,583
Gila	14,095	62.88%	7,884	35.17%	438	1.95%	6,211	27.71%	22,417
Graham	8,376	69.40%	3,487	28.89%	206	1.71%	4,889	40.51%	12,069
Greenlee	1,712	58.63%	1,165	39.90%	43	1.47%	547	18.73%	2,920
La Paz	3,509	62.92%	1,929	34.59%	139	2.49%	1,580	28.33%	5,577
Maricopa	746,448	54.43%	602,166	43.91%	22,756	1.66%	144,282	10.52%	1,371,370
Mohave	44,333	65.20%	22,092	32.49%	1,570	2.31%	22,241	32.71%	67,995
Navajo	19,761	55.00%	15,579	43.36%	592	1.65%	4,182	11.64%	35,932
Pima	182,406	46.20%	206,254	52.24%	6,180	1.57%	-23,848	-6.04%	394,840
Pinal	59,421	56.38%	44,254	41.99%	1,723	1.63%	15,167	14.39%	105,398
Santa Cruz	4,518	33.86%	8,683	65.07%	143	1.07%	-4,165	-31.21%	13,344
Yavapai	61,192	61.08%	36,889	36.82%	2,104	2.10%	24,303	24.26%	100,185
Yuma	24,577	56.15%	18,559	42.40%	636	1.45%	6,018	13.75%	43,772
Totals	1,230,111	53.39%	1,034,707	44.91%	39,020	1.69%	195,404	8.48%	2,303,838

=== By congressional district ===
McCain won six of Arizona's eight congressional districts, including three districts that elected Democrats.

District	McCain	Obama	Representative
1st	54.42%	44.25%	Rick Renzi (110th Congress)
1st	54.42%	44.25%	Ann Kirkpatrick (111th Congress)
2nd	60.75%	38.07%	Trent Franks
3rd	56.47%	42.34%	John Shadegg
4th	33.02%	65.73%	Ed Pastor
5th	51.7%	47.17%	Harry Mitchell
6th	61.32%	37.55%	Jeff Flake
7th	41.65%	57.19%	Raul Grijalva
8th	52.37%	46.43%	Gabby Giffords

== Electors ==
Technically the voters of Arizona cast their ballots for electors: representatives to the Electoral College. Arizona is allocated 10 electors because it has 8 congressional districts and 2 senators. All candidates who appear on the ballot or qualify to receive write-in votes must submit a list of 10 electors, who pledge to vote for their candidate and their running mate. Whoever wins the majority of votes in the state is awarded all 10 electoral votes. Their chosen electors then vote for president and vice president. Although electors are pledged to their candidate and running mate, they are not obligated to vote for them. An elector who votes for someone other than their candidate is known as a faithless elector.

The electors of each state and the District of Columbia met on December 15, 2008, to cast their votes for president and vice president. The Electoral College itself never meets as one body. Instead the electors from each state and the District of Columbia met in their respective capitols.

The following were the members of the Electoral College from the state. All 10 were pledged to John McCain and Sarah Palin:

1. Bruce Ash
2. Kurt Davis
3. Wes Gullett
4. Sharon Harper
5. Jack Londen
6. Beverly Lockett Miller
7. Lee Miller
8. Bettina Nava
9. Randy Pullen
10. Michael Rappoport
