= 1000Memories =

Website

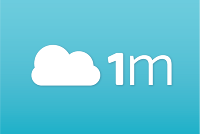
- Type: Private
- Founded: 2010; 16 years ago
- Founders: Rudy Adler; Jonathan Good; Brett Huneycutt
- Defunct: 2013
- Fate: Acquired by Ancestry.com
- Headquarters: San Francisco, California, United States
- Website: 1000memories.com

1000Memories was a website that let people organize, share, and discover old photos and memories and to set up family trees. It was shut down in late 2013 after an acquisition by Ancestry.com.

== History ==
The company was based out of San Francisco, California, and was founded in 2010 after co-founders Brett Huneycutt and Jonathan Good left McKinsey, and co-founder Rudy Adler left Wieden+Kennedy. Huneycutt and Adler met in elementary school and had previously co-founded the Border Film Project. Huneycutt and Good met as Rhodes Scholars.

1000Memories was originally funded by Y Combinator, and has received $2.5 million in funding from Greylock Partners. Additional investors included Paul Buchheit, Keith Rabois, Ron Conway, Caterina Fake, Mike Maples, and Chris Sacca, among others.

In the fall of 2012, 1000Memories was acquired by Ancestry.com for an undisclosed sum.
