= Gil Ferguson =

American politician (1923–2007)

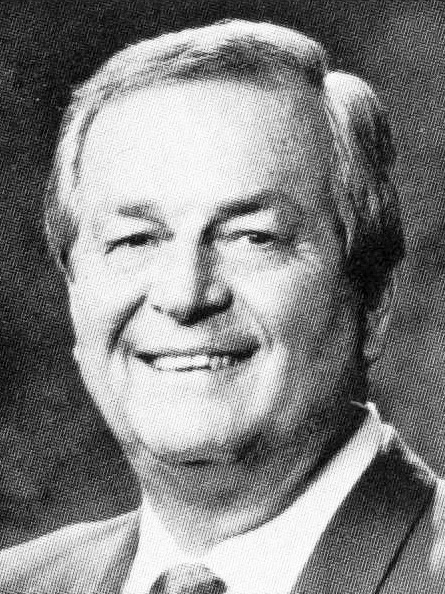
- Ferguson in 1988

Member of the California State Assembly from the 70th district
- In office December 3, 1984 – November 30, 1994
- Preceded by: Marian Bergeson
- Succeeded by: Marilyn Brewer

Personal details
- Born: April 22, 1923 St. Louis, Missouri, US
- Died: May 6, 2007 (aged 84) Newport Beach, California, US
- Party: Republican
- Spouse: Anita Jean
- Children: 4

Military service
- Branch/service: United States Marine Corps
- Battles/wars: World War II; Korean War; Vietnam War

Gilbert Warren Ferguson (April 22, 1923 – May 6, 2007) was an American marine, businessman and politician.

Born in St. Louis, Missouri, Ferguson served as a Lieutenant Colonel in the United States Marine Corps during World War II, the Korean War, and the Vietnam War. Ferguson went to University of Southern California. He also studied at the University of Akron. He was a Vice President for the Irvine Company in the advertising and public relations business and lived in Newport Beach, California. From 1984 to 1994, Ferguson served in the California State Assembly and was a Republican. During his tenure in the California Assembly, he advocated for less government and more individual competition for housing and medical access, and private responsibility in environmental issues, notably championing "high occupancy vehicle" traffic lanes and responsible land use. Ferguson supported considerable racial diversity. In August 1990 Lt Col(Ret) Ferguson introduced a resolution that states "it is simply untrue that Japanese-Americans were interned in concentration camps during World War II."

== Military service ==
As a marine, Ferguson fought at the Battle of Tarawa during World War II, where he received the Purple Heart. He also served in Korea during the Korean War and Vietnam during the Vietnam War.
