= 2005 California's 48th congressional district special election =

- December 6, 2005
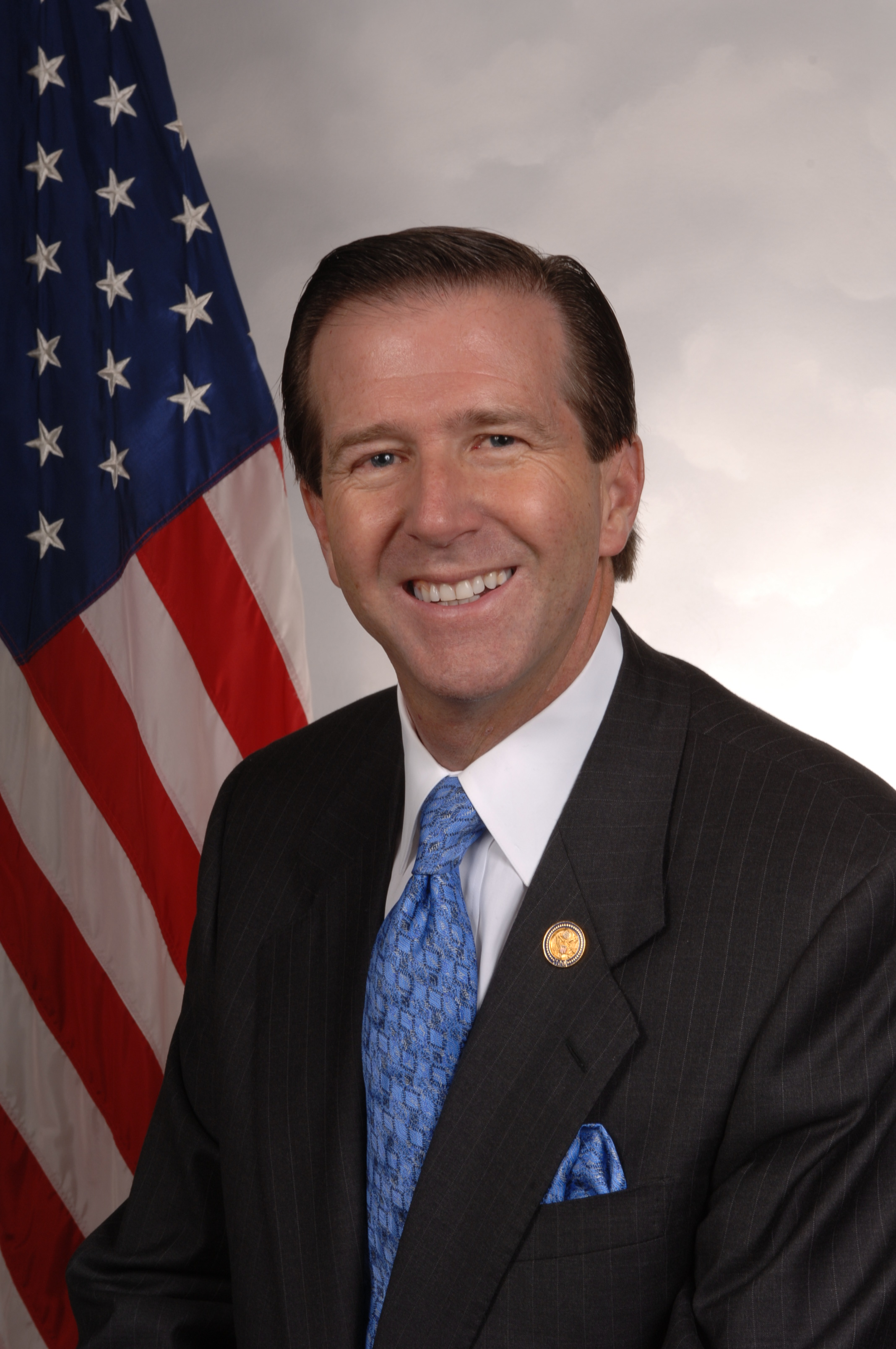

Nominee	John Campbell	Steve Young	Jim Gilchrist
Party	Republican	Democratic	American Independent
Popular vote	46,184	28,853	26,507
Percentage	44.4%	27.8%	25.5%
U.S. Representative before election
Christopher Cox
Republican
Elected U.S. Representative
John Campbell
Republican

In the fall of 2005, a special election was held in California's 48th congressional district to choose a United States representative to replace Republican Christopher Cox, who resigned effective August 2, 2005, to become Chairman of the U.S. Securities and Exchange Commission. A Special primary election was held on October 4. Because no candidate received more than 50% of the vote, a runoff general election took place on December 6, 2005. The top vote getter from each party moved to the runoff contest, which only required a candidate to receive a plurality of the vote. Republican candidate John Campbell ultimately won the runoff with only 44% of the vote, as there were three major candidates, rather than the usual two.

== District geography ==
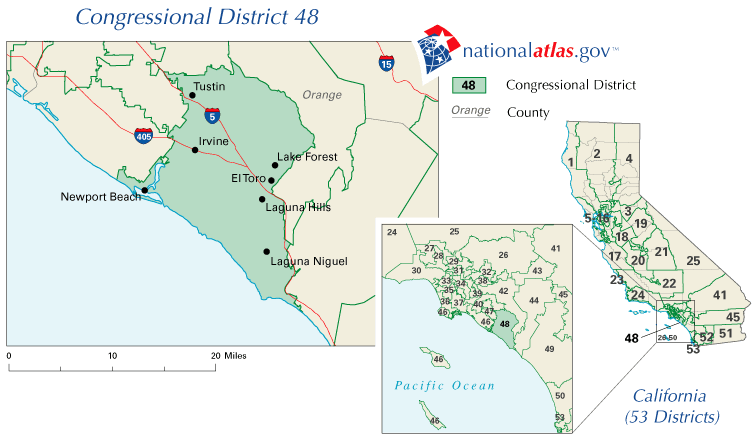
Map of the California 48th congressional district as of 2005.

The district is located in Orange County in southern California, and includes the cities of Aliso Viejo, Dana Point, Irvine, Laguna Beach, Laguna Hills, Laguna Niguel, Laguna Woods Lake Forest (formerly known as El Toro), Tustin, and parts of Newport Beach, San Juan Capistrano, and Santa Ana.

== Candidates ==
Ten Republicans qualified for the special primary election. California State Senator John Campbell won the Republican nomination by coming in first in the special primary election. Former State Assemblywoman Marilyn Brewer came in second. Other Republican candidates included dentist David R. Crouch, former Tustin councilman John Kelly, attorney Scott MacCabe, attorney Guy E. Mailly, real estate agent Masha A. Morris, businessman Marshall Samuel Sanders, businessman Edward A. Suppe, and physician Don A. Udall.

Four Democrats qualified for the special primary election. Attorney Steve Young, UCI professor John Graham (who ran for the seat in three previous elections against Chris Cox: 2000, 2002 and 2004), teacher Bea Foster, and marketing consultant Tom Pallow.

Real estate agent Bruce D. Cohen of the Libertarian Party and teacher Béa Tiritilli of the Green Party were both unopposed for the nominations of their respective parties. Minuteman Project founder Jim Gilchrist was eventually chosen for the American Independent Party nomination. Former Republican Congressman Bob Dornan also briefly tried to capture the nomination of the American Independent Party, but was rebuffed by the party's leaders. Dornan would later endorse Gilchrist.

Campbell and Brewer were generally considered the frontrunners, with Gilchrist viewed as a possible spoiler against Campbell in the special primary election. Campbell had the backing of many major Republican officeholders, including Governor Arnold Schwarzenegger, and closely identified with the policies of President George W. Bush. Brewer was considered the more moderate alternative, in favor of abortion and stem cell research and endorsed by Senator John McCain. A sore point for some conservatives in the district was Campbell's position on illegal immigration. Gilchrist ran as a third-party candidate primarily on his support for stronger immigration laws.

== Primary election ==
On October 4, Republican John Campbell garnered 45.5 percent of the vote, 4.5 percent short of the majority necessary to avoid a runoff race. He faced the leading vote-getter from the four other parties participating: American Independent Jim Gilchrist, Democrat Steve Young, Green Béa Tiritilli, and Libertarian Bruce Cohen in a December 6 runoff.

California's 48th congressional district special primary, 2005
Party	Candidate	Votes	Percentage
Republican	John Campbell	41,420	45.2
Republican	Marilyn Brewer	15,595	17.0
American Independent	Jim Gilchrist	13,423	14.6
Democratic	Steve Young	7,941	8.7
Democratic	John Graham	3,667	4.0
Democratic	Bea Foster	2,944	3.2
Republican	Don Udall	1,417	1.5
Republican	John Kelly	1,070	1.2
Green	Béa Tiritilli	790	0.9
Libertarian	Bruce Cohen	731	0.8
Republican	David Crouch	523	0.6
Republican	Scott MacCabe	397	0.4
Republican	Marsha Morris	351	0.4
Democratic	Tom Pallow	307	0.3
Republican	Guy Mailly	153	0.2
Republican	Marshall Samuel Sanders	110	0.1
Republican	Edward Suppe	101	0.1
Republican	Delecia Holt (write-in)	11	0.1
Republican	Steven Wesley Blake (write-in)	2	0.0
Invalid ballots		758	0.8
Totals		91,711	100.0
Voter turnout		22.8	

== General election ==
=== Political climate ===
The district is overwhelmingly conservative, with Republicans enjoying a 2 to 1 voter registration advantage (Christopher Cox won his last bid for re-election with 65% of the vote). Most pundits therefore viewed the contest as which Republican candidate would get the honor of filling the vacant seat. Because John Campbell obtained the majority of the endorsements within the Republican establishment, and was able to raise over $2,000,000, it quickly became apparent that Campbell would be destined to win.

Campbell's strategy was to ensure that Jim Gilchrist would not "steal" too many votes that would have otherwise gone to him had Gilchrist not run. Gilchrist, for his part, spent $500,000 to ensure that the topic of illegal immigration was prominent in the race. Democratic attorney Steve Young spent a large amount of his own money in the hope that Gilchrist and Campbell would split the conservative vote to a point which would allow him to edge both of them. Although Gilchrist spent more than twice the amount Young spent, Young edged Gilchrist for second place by two percentage points in the December 6 general election.

Campbell's confidence in his victory was quite evident. In September, he skipped a candidate forum, and in November he attended a fundraiser for himself in Washington D.C. in which Dick Cheney was the guest of honor. He also bought a December 7 early morning airplane ticket to Washington days before the December 6 runoff.

=== Results ===
The result of the December 6 general election is notable in that Campbell's plurality actually decreased by more than a point, and the combined Democratic total nearly doubled in the general election, with Gilchrist additionally gaining ten points. This would seem to indicate that a large majority of the voters who voted for a Republican candidate other than Campbell in the October 4 special primary election, did not rally behind Campbell in the special general election.

California's 48th congressional district special election, 2005
Party	Candidate	Votes	Percentage
Republican	John Campbell	46,184	44.4
Democratic	Steve Young	28,853	27.8
American Independent	Jim Gilchrist	26,507	25.5
Green	Béa Tiritilli	1,430	1.4
Libertarian	Bruce Cohen	974	0.9
Invalid ballots		457	0.4
Totals		104,405	100.0
Voter turnout		25.7	

== Aftermath ==
Campbell's victory caused a vacancy in the 35th State Senate district. A special primary election was scheduled for April 11, 2006. Two Republicans: Assemblymember and former Huntington Beach, California councilmember Tom Harman, and Dana Point, California councilmember Diane Harkey raised $330,000 and $800,000 respectively for the race (Harkey spent $620,000 of her own money). The Democratic candidate, Larry Caballero, spent virtually nothing. In a race that was largely centered on the issue of illegal immigration, Harman edged Harkey by 236 votes, out of over 98,000 votes cast. Harkey sought a recount of the official results, at a cost of $14,000 (which she had to pay for). The recount did not change the outcome, with Harman's lead shrinking to 225 votes. Harman faced Caballero in a runoff on June 6 and won the race to succeed Campbell by a 2–1 margin.

Harman's election to the State Senate left a vacancy in the State Assembly, which stayed vacant until December 4, 2006, when Jim Silva was sworn in after winning the regularly scheduled election for the seat on November 7.

== See also ==
- List of special elections to the United States House of Representatives
