= Chris Simcox =

American activist (born 1961)

Chris Simcox (born 1961) is an American co-founder of the Minuteman Civil Defense Corps (MCDC), the project's main spokesperson, and a convicted sex offender. In June 2016, he was convicted of child sexual abuse and is serving a 19.5-year sentence.

== Minuteman Civil Defense Corps ==
In October 2002, Simcox issued a public call to arms, inviting readers of his newspaper, the Tombstone Tumbleweed, to join a "Citizens Border Patrol Militia" whose function, Simcox said, would be to "shame the government into doing its job" of controlling the United States's border with Mexico.

He founded Civil Homeland Defense, a group which patrolled the border, and within the next two and a half years sought to assist the United States Border Patrol.

Simcox's practice of reporting illegal immigrants attempting to enter the country has been controversial, and questions concerning its legality have been raised. When Civil Homeland Defense was first formed, Simcox's opponents claimed that it is illegal for a normal citizen who is in no way affiliated with law enforcement to detain people in the United States. Simcox claimed at that time that these detentions were justified under a "citizen's arrest" policy. Since the inception of the MCDC, however, their "Standard Operating Procedure" (SOP) states that "Minutemen Observe, Report, Record, and Direct Border Patrol or other appropriate emergency or law enforcement agencies to suspected Illegal Aliens or Illegal Activities."

In December 2004, Simcox teamed with James Gilchrist to organize the Minuteman Project, which brought nationwide attention to the southern border. While some have accused the Minuteman members of being vigilantes, supporters claim that there has never been a case of a member of The Minuteman Project physically harming anyone.

Simcox was interviewed for the 2005 independent documentary Wetback: The Undocumented Documentary. He also appeared in a 2006 documentary by Joseph Matthew and Dan DeVivo called "Crossing Arizona" and a 2007 documentary by Chris Burgard called "Border". He has been featured as a guest on The Political Cesspool.

On April 21, 2006, Simcox sent a message to President George W. Bush asking him to send National Guard troops to guard the border or the "Minutemen" would begin construction of a wall along the border, built on private property.

Simcox has stated he does not receive a salary from Minutemen, and earns income via honoraria and fees received for speaking engagements. He claims to have sold his life story for a film that will soon go into production.

During the period between his departure from the Minutemen and his arrest in 2013, Simcox worked for iMemories in Scottsdale, Arizona.

== Senate campaign ==
Simcox announced he was stepping down from MCDC to challenge in the 2010 Republican primary the renomination of U.S. Senator John McCain of Arizona. Former U.S. Congressman J. D. Hayworth officially launched his bid on February 15, 2010, in Phoenix. His announcement led Simcox to drop his campaign and endorse Hayworth, saying that he wanted to present a "united conservative front". On his campaign website Simcox announced that he stepped down because "This race had quickly become bigger than what our family could manage" and "When JD Hayworth entered the race he was financially unable to continue."

== Personal life ==
Simcox was formerly a kindergarten teacher at the Wildwood School in Los Angeles, California, where he taught for thirteen years.

On April 16, 2010, Simcox's third wife was granted an order of protection after she alleged that Simcox "brandished a gun and threatened to shoot her, their children and any police officers who tried to protect them." Chris Simcox arrived at a Maricopa County Courthouse to have himself served on July 6, 2010.

== Child molestation conviction ==
On June 19, 2013, Simcox was arrested by the Phoenix Police Department on multiple counts related to child molestation and sexual conduct with a minor. The arrest took place in Phoenix, Arizona and involved three girls under the age of 10 years, one of which was his own daughter. He was charged with two counts of child molestation, two counts of sexual conduct with a minor, and one of the attempted molestation of a child.

Simcox rejected a plea deal on November 21, 2014, maintaining his innocence. His trial was set for March 2, 2015, and he sought to represent himself. He failed to appear in court on his trial date, citing a medical condition. A new trial was set for April 4, 2016. Simcox had planned to act as his own attorney and intended to cross examine his accusers, but on March 22, he waived his rights to question his accusers and allowed his attorney to question them. On June 8, he was found guilty of molesting a five-year-old girl. On July 11, he was sentenced to 19.5 years in prison.
