= 2008 Arizona Democratic presidential primary =

- February 5, 2008

67 Democratic National Convention delegates (56 pledged, 11 unpledged)

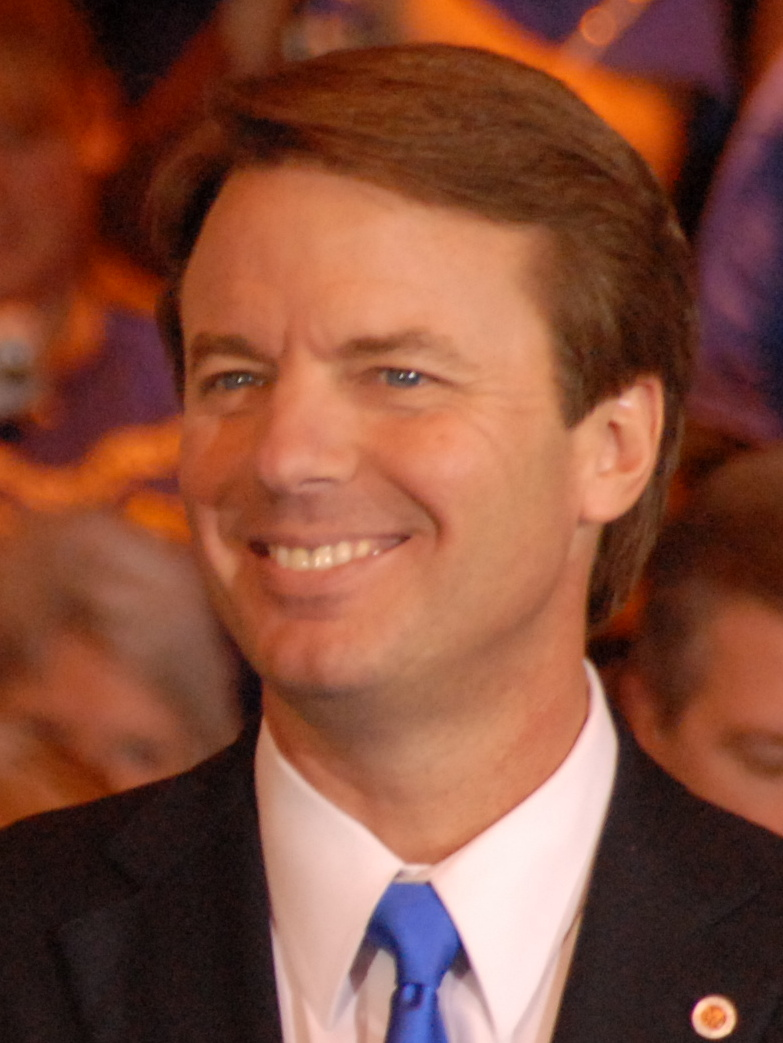
Candidate	Hillary Clinton	Barack Obama	John Edwards (withdrawn)
Home state	New York	Illinois	North Carolina
Delegate count	31	25	0
Popular vote	229,501	193,126	23,621
Percentage	50.37%	42.39%	5.18%
- Primary results by county Clinton: 40–50% 50–60% 60–70% Obama: 40–50% 50–60%

The 2008 Arizona Democratic presidential primary took place on Super Tuesday, February 5, 2008, and had a total of 56 delegates at stake. The winner in each of Arizona's eight congressional districts was awarded all of that district's delegates, which totaled 37. Another 19 delegates were awarded to the statewide winner, Hillary Clinton. The 56 delegates represented Arizona at the Democratic National Convention in Denver, Colorado. Eleven other unpledged delegates, known as superdelegates, also attended the convention.

== Results ==
2008 Arizona Democratic Presidential Primary Results
Party	Candidate	Votes	Percentage	Delegates
Democratic	Hillary Clinton	229,501	50.37%	31
Democratic	Barack Obama	193,126	42.39%	25
Democratic	John Edwards	23,621	5.18%	0
Democratic	Other Candidates	3,748	0.82%	0
Democratic	Bill Richardson	2,842	0.62%	0
Democratic	Dennis Kucinich	1,973	0.43%	0
Democratic	Eddie Dobson	398	0.8%	0
Democratic	Others	426	0.10%	0
Democratic	Unnalocated	-	-	11
Totals		455,635	100.00%	56
Voter turnout		%		—

== Analysis ==
One of the most diverse states in the nation with a heavily Latino population, Hillary Clinton was declared the winner of the Arizona Democratic primary. According to exit polls, 68 percent of voters in the Arizona Democratic primary were Caucasian and they opted for Clinton by a margin of 53–38. Clinton also won the Latino vote in Arizona by a margin of 55–41, which accounted for 18 percent of the electorate, as well as the Native American vote by a margin of 53-45 which accounted for 5 percent of the total voters in the primary. Obama carried the African American vote by a margin of 79–12, which accounted for 8 percent of the electorate. In terms of age, Obama won all voters under the age of 40 while Clinton won those over the age of 40. In terms of educational attainment, Clinton won all those who had a high school diploma, some college and/or college graduates while Obama won those who possessed postgraduate degrees. Clinton won self-identified Democratic voters and all ideological groups while Obama carried Independents in the state. Pertaining to religion, Clinton won all the major denominations in Arizona – Protestants backed Clinton 51–38, Catholics 57–37, Jews 51–44, and other Christians 47–46. Obama won nonreligious voters and voters who affiliated with other religions.

Clinton performed extremely well statewide in Arizona – carrying all counties but two: Coconino and Yavapai. She carried Maricopa County, which contains the state capital and largest city of Phoenix by a healthy margin as well as many of its suburbs. She also performed well in Southern Arizona, carrying Yuma and Tucson. She also carried seven of the state's eight congressional districts – the 5th District, which contains Tempe and Scottsdale, was won by Obama.

Former governor Janet Napolitano endorsed Obama.

== See also ==
- 2008 Arizona Republican primary
