= John Campbell (California politician) =

American politician (born 1955)

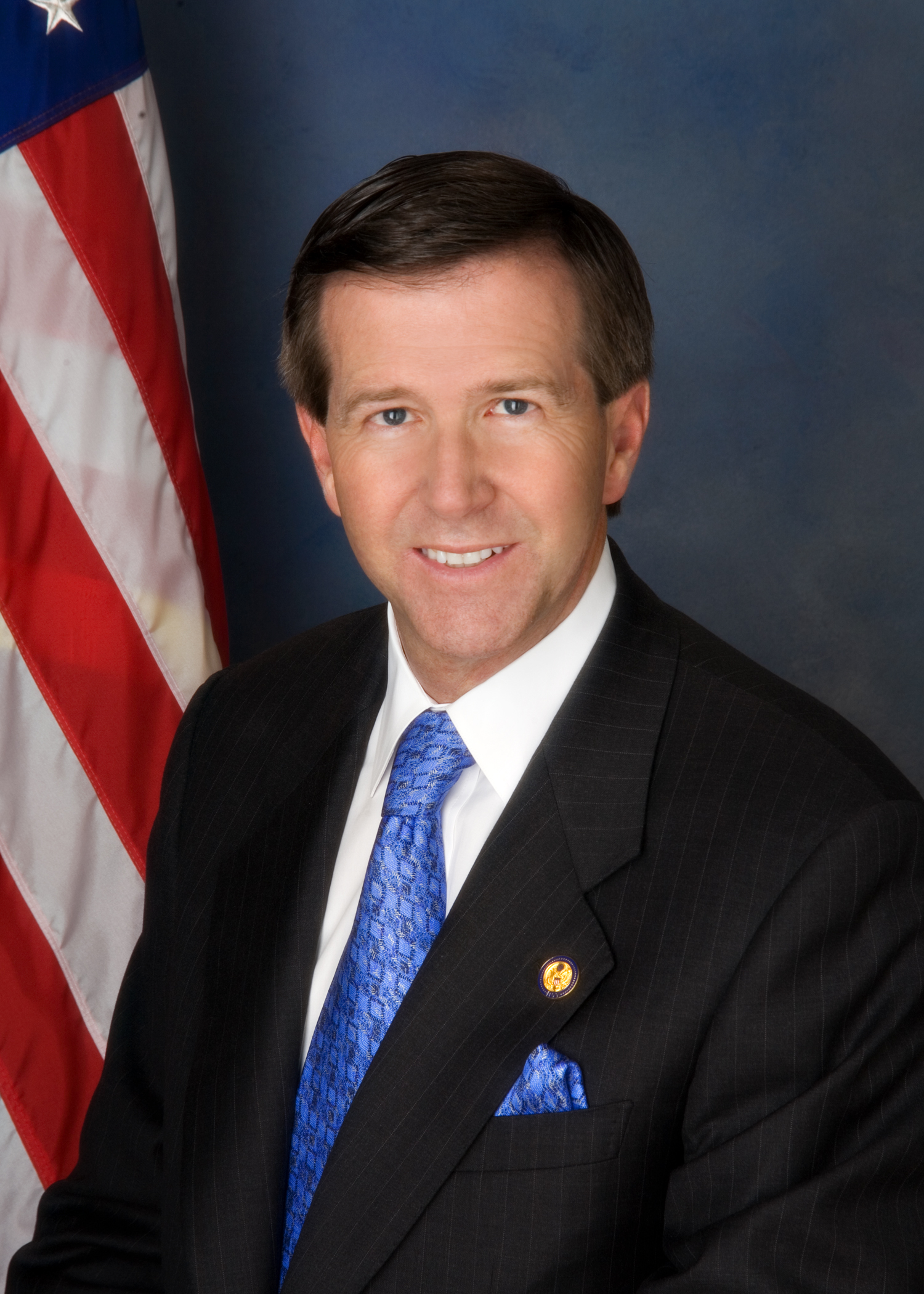
- Official portrait, 2006

Member of the U.S. House of Representatives from California
- In office December 6, 2005 – January 3, 2015 (Note: Campbell's official service begins on the date of the special election, while he was not sworn in until December 7, 2005.)
- Preceded by: Christopher Cox
- Succeeded by: Mimi Walters
- Constituency: 48th district (2005–2013); 45th district (2013–2015)

Member of the California State Senate from the 35th district
- In office December 6, 2004 – December 6, 2005
- Preceded by: Ross Johnson
- Succeeded by: Tom Harman

Member of the California State Assembly from the 70th district
- In office December 4, 2000 – November 30, 2004
- Preceded by: Marilyn Brewer
- Succeeded by: Chuck DeVore

Personal details
- Born: John Bayard Taylor Campbell III; July 19, 1955 (age 70) Los Angeles, California, U.S.
- Party: Republican
- Spouse: Catherine Campbell
- Children: 2
- Education: University of California, Los Angeles (BA); University of Southern California (MS)

John Bayard Taylor Campbell III (born July 19, 1955) is an American politician who served as a U.S. representative from California from 2005 to 2015. A member of the Republican Party, he previously served in the California State Assembly (2000–2004) and California State Senate (2004–2005). In Congress, Campbell represented the state's 48th congressional district for four terms and 45th congressional district for one term. On June 27, 2013, he announced that he would not seek reelection in 2014.

== Business career ==
In 1985, Campbell became President and CEO of Campbell Automotive Group. In 1990, he became president and CEO of Saturn of Orange County. Campbell became Chairman and CEO of Saab of Orange County in 1999.

== California Legislature ==
Elected to represent southern Orange County's 70th District in the California State Assembly in 2000, Campbell won 60% of the vote in a five-way race to replace term-limited Assemblywoman Marilyn Brewer. Campbell was reelected in 2002 with 67% of the vote.

In the 2004 race to replace the term-limited Ross Johnson in the 35th State Senate District, Campbell won the Republican primary with 61% of the vote against fellow Assemblyman Ken Maddox, who received 30% of the vote. In the general election, Campbell won with 64%. Then-Governor Arnold Schwarzenegger, a close ally of Campbell, endorsed him in the race.

As a state Senator, Campbell served as Vice Chair of both the Business Professions and Economic Development Committee and the Labor and Industrial Relations Committee. He was also a member of the Budget and Fiscal Review Committee; the Energy, Utilities, and Communications Committee; the Environmental Quality Committee; and the Government Modernization, Efficiency, and Accountability Committee.

== U.S. House of Representatives ==
=== Committee assignments ===
- Committee on the Budget
- Committee on Financial Services
  - Subcommittee on Monetary Policy and Trade, Chair
  - Subcommittee on Financial Institutions and Consumer Credit
- Joint Economic Committee

=== Party leadership and caucus membership ===
- Former Chairman of the Budget and Spending Task Force of the Republican Study Committee

On June 17, 2009, Campbell signed on as a co-sponsor of H.R. 1503, the bill introduced as a reaction to conspiracy theories which claimed that U.S. President Barack Obama is not a natural born U.S. citizen. Campbell stated on Hardball with Chris Matthews that he believed that Obama was a natural born U.S. citizen and that he believed the bill would end the conspiracy theories surrounding Obama's citizenship.

On July 13, 2006, Campbell was one of 33 Republican House members to vote against renewing the Voting Rights Act for 25 years, mostly out of his objections to the bilingual ballots that the VRA mandated, which he and his fellow Republicans called an "unfunded mandate".

On December 15, 2010, Campbell was one of fifteen Republican House members to vote in favor of repealing the United States military's "Don't Ask, Don't Tell" ban on openly gay service members.

In 2011, Campbell voted against the National Defense Authorization Act for Fiscal Year 2012 as part of a controversial provision that allows the government and the military to indefinitely detain American citizens and others without trial.

He sponsored the Put Your Money Where Your Mouth Is Act which would make it easier for taxpayers to make donations to the federal government. In 2010 Campbell signed a pledge sponsored by Americans for Prosperity promising to vote against any Global Warming legislation that would raise taxes.

Campbell is a member of the Congressional Constitution Caucus.

== Political campaigns ==
After Congressman Christopher Cox resigned to become Chairman of the U.S. Securities and Exchange Commission, Campbell became a candidate to replace Cox in the 48th Congressional District special election, scheduled for October 4, 2005. Campbell received endorsements from most of the important Republican officials in the state but faced some criticism as his stance on illegal immigration was seen as being too lenient. He faced a strong third-party challenge from American Independent Party candidate Jim Gilchrist. On October 4, Campbell garnered 46% of the vote, below the 50% needed to avoid a runoff. He faced Democrat Steve Young, American Independent Jim Gilchrist, Libertarian Bruce D. Cohen and Green Bea Tirtilli in the December 6 runoff, which he won with 44% of the vote. Campbell was sworn in on December 7.

Campbell was re-elected to his first full term in 2006 with 60% of the vote. In 2008 and 2010, he was re-elected with 56% and 60%, respectively, of the vote. In 2012, he was re-elected with 59% of the vote.

In 2009, several watchdog groups claimed Campbell took $170,000 in campaign contributions from car dealers, and then introduced legislation exempting them from consumer protection laws.

U.S. House of Representatives
Preceded by Christopher Cox	Member of the U.S. House of Representatives from California's 48th congressional district 2005–2013	Succeeded by Dana Rohrabacher
Preceded by Mary Bono	Member of the U.S. House of Representatives from California's 45th congressional district 2013–2015	Succeeded by Mimi Walters
U.S. order of precedence (ceremonial)
Preceded by Diane Watson as Former U.S. Representative	Order of precedence of the United States as Former U.S. Representative	Succeeded by Duncan D. Hunter as Former U.S. Representative
