= Border Film Project =

The Border Film Project (Spanish: Proyecto fotográfico de frontera) is an art project examining United States–Mexico border immigration from two perspectives. The project gave disposable cameras to two groups on different sides of the United States–Mexico border: illegal migrants crossing the desert and the Minutemen volunteers trying to stop them. Photos reveal facets of the dispute previously unavailable to the public: men hopping fences, riding trucks, and sleeping in the desert. The photographs are now displayed at art galleries across the country and a book was released on April 1, 2007, through Harry N. Abrams.

== Related reading ==
- Susan Harbage Page and Inés Valdez, "Residues of Border Control", Southern Spaces, 17 April 2011.
