= J. T. Ready =

American vigilante and mass murderer (1973–2012)

- Born: Jason Todd Ready; February 17, 1973; Florida, US
- Died: May 2, 2012 (aged 39); Gilbert, Arizona, US
- Cause of death: Suicide by gunshot
- Known for: Four murders, leader of a border militia group
- Political party: Republican, Democrat, and National Socialist Movement (United States)
- Spouse(s): Arline Lindgren (divorced, 2003)
- Partner: Lisa Mederos

Jason Todd Ready (February 17, 1973 – May 2, 2012) was an American marine, founder and leader of a border militia group, and a member of the neo-Nazi National Socialist Movement who sought the elected office of sheriff of Pinal County, Arizona. On May 2, 2012, at Ready's home in Gilbert, Arizona, he shot and killed his girlfriend, her daughter and granddaughter, the daughter's fiancé and himself.

== Early years ==
Ready graduated from Mulberry High School in Mulberry, Florida, in 1992. While Ready was in high school at age 18, he was arrested and charged with aggravated assault and criminal mischief for swinging a baseball bat at a car driven by a teenager whom he had an altercation with at a party. He was given a sentence of one year's probation and community service.

== Military service ==
Ready served in the U.S. Marine Corps, achieving the rank of lance corporal. He attended MCRD Parris Island and went to the School of Infantry in North Carolina. Ready was assigned to MCB Camp Pendleton with Reconnaissance Company and 1st LAR Bravo company. He was expelled from Reconnaissance Company and eventually became a Scout for a LAV-25 with an M249 light machine gun being his main weapon. During a field exercise at Twentynine Palms Base, he arrived without his M249 and was duly punished in the field by his platoon sergeant. Because of his weight and a knee injury sustained from a PT football game, he did not serve aboard the USS Anchorage when Bravo Company left with the 15th MEU in November 1995.

=== Court martial ===
Ready was twice court-martialed during his service. The first resulted in a demotion and three months' imprisonment, the second resulted in six months' imprisonment and a Bad Conduct Discharge from the Corps in 1996. Convictions in the courts-martial included theft, assault, failure to follow orders, and unauthorized absence. The revelation of this history caused him to be removed as the master of ceremonies for a Mesa, Arizona, Veterans' Day parade in 2006.

== Vigilante activities ==
Ready was a founder of the Minuteman Civil Defense Corps and the U.S. Border Guard, two armed vigilante groups that patrolled the Arizona–Mexico border searching for illegal immigrants.

Ready was caught forcibly detaining immigrants twice in 2011. At the time of his death he was under investigation by the FBI, who were looking into a potential domestic terrorism situation involving immigrants found shot to death in the desert.

== Personal life ==
Ready and his wife Arline Lindgren divorced in 2003. Ready was baptized into the Church of Jesus Christ of Latter-day Saints (LDS Church) in 2003 and ordained as an elder by then-Arizona State Senator Russell Pearce. In December 2010, a fellow church member described him as "no longer active" and Ready described himself as a "recovering Mormon". Prior to moving in with Mederos, he worked at an AutoZone auto parts store, from which he was fired.

Gilbert police had responded to a domestic-violence call at the Mederos home once before in February 2012, and a Scottsdale woman had filed an order of protection against Ready in 2009.

== Politics ==
Ready was politically active in anti-immigration causes. He served as president of the Mesa Community College Republican Party Club and as a precinct committeeman for the Maricopa County Republicans. Ready unsuccessfully campaigned for a seat in the Arizona House of Representatives in 2004 and for a seat on the city council for Mesa, Arizona, in 2006. He put forth as his motto that "The Purity of the Aryan Race is the most precious resource Nature has to offer All of Humankind." Ready founded a private organization in June 2010 called the U.S. Border Guard, which aimed to curtail illegal immigration by conducting armed patrols along the Arizona–Mexico border. He attended and spoke at Tea Party movement events.

The Anti-Defamation League and the Southern Poverty Law Center described Ready as a neo-Nazi. Several Republicans attempted to have him expelled from his position in the party in Maricopa County due to his controversial views. Before starting a campaign for the position of Pinal County sheriff, he left the National Socialist Movement, but had Movement member Harry Hughes serving as his campaign chairman. He ran for sheriff as a Democrat, citing the party's past support for Jim Crow and Democratic politicians who had supported racial segregation, such as West Virginia U.S. Senator Robert Byrd (in the 1940s) and Alabama Governor George Wallace (later independent presidential candidate), as well as stating his opinion that there was no difference between the Republican and Democratic parties, and that in a non-partisan position such as sheriff, political affiliation did not matter. After Ready's murder-suicide, Pearce released a statement saying that he had previously rejected Ready due to his association with "despicable groups in society", and had objected to Ready's position in the Republican Party.

== Gilbert shooting ==
On May 2, 2012, Ready entered his home in Gilbert, Arizona, and used a 9mm semi-automatic pistol to fatally shoot his girlfriend Lisa, her daughter Amber, Amber's boyfriend, Jim Hiott, and Amber's infant daughter Lilly. He then fatally shot himself. A 9-1-1 call made from the house referred to an argument before the call was interrupted by gunfire. A teenager in the house at the time was in her bedroom and heard an argument, but survived the incident without being shot.

The victims were:

- Lisa Mederos, age 47, Ready's girlfriend. She is believed to have made the first 9-1-1 call and was found dead inside the home.
- Amber Mederos, 23, Lisa's daughter with Hugo Mederos. She was found dead inside the home.
- Lilly Mederos, 15 months, Amber's daughter. She was initially found alive inside the home, but was pronounced dead at the hospital.
- Jim Hiott, 24, Amber's fiancée, an Army veteran who served in Afghanistan. He was found dead outside the home near Ready's body.

Local police believe this shooting started as a domestic dispute. No specific motive has been revealed. Alongside the local police, the incident and premises were investigated by the Joint Terrorism Task Force, the FBI and the ATF, who found firearms, including two AR-15 style rifles and approximately two dozen military ordnance/40 mm grenades inside the garage, as well as Nazi flags, and police and Nazi uniforms.

According to an autopsy report, the shooter had no drugs or alcohol in his system, he shot himself once in the "right temporal scalp", and a “copper-colored jacketed gray metallic mushroom-shaped bullet” was taken out of the left side of his brain during the autopsy.
