= 2008 Arizona Republican presidential primary =

- February 5, 2008

53 delegates to the Republican National Convention (50 pledged, 3 unpledged)

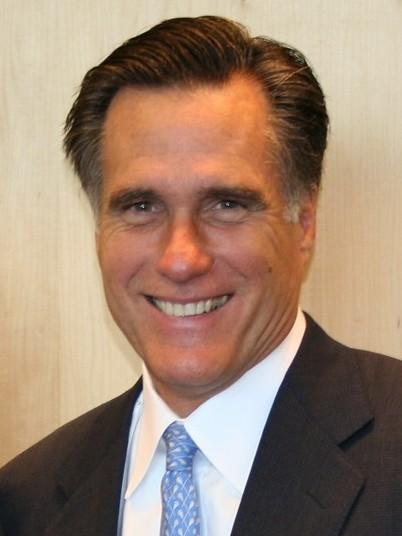

Candidate	John McCain	Mitt Romney	Mike Huckabee
Home state	Arizona	Massachusetts	Arkansas
Delegate count	50	0	0
Popular vote	255,197	186,838	48,849
Percentage	47.17%	34.53%	9.03%
- Election results by county. John McCain Mitt Romney

The 2008 Arizona Republican presidential primary took place on February 5, 2008, with 50 national delegates. John McCain would be able to win his homestate against competitors Mitt Romney and Mike Huckabee.

== Results ==
2008 Arizona Republican primary
Candidate	Votes	Percentage	Delegates Received
John McCain	255,197	47.17%	50
Mitt Romney	186,838	34.53%	0
Mike Huckabee	48,849	9.03%	0
Ron Paul	22,692	4.19%	0
Rudy Giuliani	13,658	2.52%	0
Fred Thompson	9,492	1.75%	0
Duncan Hunter	1,082	0.20%	0
Alan Keyes	970	0.18%	0
John McGraph	490	0.09%	0
Frank McEnulty	333	0.06%	0
Sean "CF" Murphy	269	0.05%	0
John Fitzpatrick	199	0.04%	0
James Mitchell Jr.	193	0.04%	0
David Ruben	104	0.02%	0
Michael Burzinski	98	0.02%	0
Jerry Curry	98	0.02%	0
Jack Shepard	78	0.01%	0
Bob Forthan	75	0.01%	0
Michael Shaw	62	0.01%	0
Hugh Cort	58	0.01%	0
Daniel Gilbert	53	0.01%	0
Rick Outzen	53	0.01%	0
Charles Skelley	50	0.01%	0
Rhett Smith	44	0.01%	0
Totals	541,035	100.00%	53*

Note: * Includes 3 unpledged Republican National Committee delegates

== See also ==
- 2008 Arizona Democratic primary
- 2008 Republican Party presidential primaries
