= Jim Gilchrist =

American political activist

- Born: James Walter Gilchrist Jr. North Providence, Rhode Island, U.S.
- Occupation: Minuteman Project
- Political party: Republican
- Other political affiliations: Constitution (2005)

James Walter Gilchrist Jr. is an American political activist and the co-founder and president of The Minuteman Project, an activist group whose aim is to prevent illegal immigration across the southern border of the United States.

== Early life ==
Gilchrist served in the U.S. Marine Corps and received a Purple Heart medal while in the infantry during the Vietnam War, 1968 - 1969.

== Minuteman Project ==
Gilchrist and Chris Simcox are widely recognized as the founders of the Minuteman Project. They founded the organization in August 2004. The two staged a month-long border watch project in April 2005, and that event catapulted the Minuteman movement into the national spotlight. Gilchrist chose to locate the project in Arizona because there was a disproportionately large number of undocumented immigrants crossing the border in that state.

== Political views ==
Gilchrist holds conservative views on education, health care, and taxes. He was registered with the American Independent Party, the California affiliate of the Constitution Party, but has since re-registered as a Republican, and is an adamant supporter of immigration enforcement, law enforcement, and the military. He announced his endorsement of Mike Huckabee for President in December 2007. The personal endorsement of Huckabee by Gilchrist met with strong criticism from other Minutemen and anti-illegal immigration activists.

During the 2016 presidential election, Gilchrist felt that the building of a wall and mass deportation directly aligned with the Minuteman Project's missions. Gilchrist stated that he felt that his goals were reaffirmed and accomplished upon his observation of such widespread awareness of immigration issues. He initially supported Ted Cruz for president, who openly criticized Barack Obama's policy of amnesty, and he was a consistent opponent against Obama's push for immigration reform.

=== 2005 congressional candidacy ===
Gilchrist unsuccessfully ran as an American Independent Party candidate for the United States House of Representatives representing California's 48th congressional district to replace Republican Christopher Cox, who resigned to become Chairman of the U.S. Securities and Exchange Commission.

In the low-turnout open primary for Cox's seat held on October 4, 2005, Gilchrist finished behind two Republicans but ahead of all other candidates, including Democrats. He received 14.8% of the vote (a total of 13,423 votes). He was the only one running for his party, and therefore automatically advanced into the run-off.

Gilchrist lost to Republican state Senator John Campbell in the December 6 general election, receiving 25.5% (26,507) of the vote. Campbell received 44.4% (46,184), Steve Young (Democrat) 27.8% (28,853), Bea Tiritilli (Green) 1.4% (1,430), and Bruce Cohen (Libertarian) 0.9% (974).

== Controversy ==
In a March 2006 interview with the Orange County Register, Gilchrist stopped just short of calling for his followers to pick up their guns: "I'm not going to promote insurrection, but if it happens, it will be on the conscience of the members of Congress who are doing this," he said. "I will not promote violence in resolving this, but I will not stop others who might pursue that."

In October 2006, Gilchrist appeared on Democracy Now and abruptly ended the interview after Karina Garcia started accusing him of being a murderer and said that he has ties to the white supremacist group National Alliance.

In May 2010, Politico reported that Howie Morgan, the Minuteman Project's political director, may have solicited donations from political campaigns in exchange for Gilchrist's endorsement. Rick Perry, Parker Griffith, and Tim Bridgewater were all recipients of Gilchrist's endorsements in 2010. Mo Brooks, an Alabama politician running against Griffith, said that Morgan indicated Gilchrist would endorse Brooks if Morgan was hired.

In September 2014, the Daily Show made a segment about the Honduran children's immigration featuring an interview with Jim Gilchrist, who compared the recent events at the border with a Trojan Horse situation, the vanguard of a Latino invasion of the United States. The correspondent Michael Che poked fun at Gilchrist's "Operation Normandy" initiative against immigrants: "If this is Operation Normandy, and the children are invading us, wouldn't that make us the Nazis?" Gilchrist warned against the dangers of the "latinization of America" that the young refugees posed and added, to a baffled interviewer, "We're all going to die some day. (...) I'm not giving a death wish on these children coming here (...) I'm saying that there's some things realistically you cannot stop."

== Books ==
- Minutemen: The Battle to Secure America's Borders, by Jim Gilchrist, Jerome R. Corsi, and Tom Tancredo. Los Angeles: World Ahead Publishing (2006). ISBN 0-9778984-1-5.

== See also ==
- Minuteman Civil Defense Corps
