= Minuteman Civil Defense Corps =

Volunteer group dedicated to preventing illegal crossings of the United States border

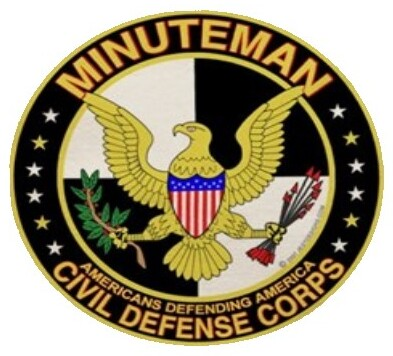
- Leaders: Chris Simcox; J. T. Ready
- Dates active: April 1, 2005 – March 22, 2010
- Active regions: Arizona, California and Texas
- Ideology: American nationalism Libertarian conservatism Survivalism
- Size: 900 volunteers

The Minuteman Civil Defense Corps was a volunteer group at one time headed by Chris Simcox (an Arizona newspaper publisher) and dedicated to preventing illegal crossings of the United States border with Mexico. Arguing that the government was insufficiently concerned with securing the border, they organized several state chapters, with the intention of providing law enforcement agencies with evidence of immigration law violations. The group was one of several that emerged for the proliferation of civilian border patrol groups at the US-Mexico border. Arguably, the emergence of these groups can be linked to the increasing criminalization and securitization of immigration. Simcox stated that the group merely reported incidents to law enforcement, and did not directly confront immigrants. There was a standard operating procedure (SOP) that was to be followed by Minutemen volunteers, with rules including not speaking to, approaching, gesturing towards or having physical contact in any way with any suspected border crossers. According to Anthony Ramirez of the New York Times, the organization "has been criticized as being a right-wing militia".

== History and activities ==
Chris Simcox founded the Civil Homeland Defense organization, being the first antecedent of the group to patrol the borders, but were disbanded after his first arrest. April 1, 2005, the group renaming the group Minuteman Civil Defense Corps was a militia organization concerned with border security that invokes the image of Revolutionary War militiamen and traces his motivation to "protect the american borders", ready at a moment's notice to fight for America's freedom. Although the majority of the group's members are White people, some Mexican Americans work to patrol the borders as well, deeply the organization's call to protect legal immigration as a measure to protect American society and resources, approximately 900 volunteers patrol a twenty-three-mile section of the Arizona-Mexico border.

The MCDC is often confused with or thought to be affiliated with The Minuteman Project Inc., but the two groups are wholly distinct. The militants have been accused of racial profiling, however, approaching persons of color, asking whether they speak English, asking where they live, and questioning them while not quizzing Caucasians in the same areas. The group was originally co-founded by American neo-Nazi, J. T. Ready.

The Minuteman Civil Defense Corps web site spells out a "standard operating procedure" for Minutemen, which includes directives such as "Minutemen are courteous to everyone with whom they come into contact, and never discriminate against anyone for any reason." The group holds up an American ideal as part of its appeal for volunteers; illegal immigration is portrayed as the reason for the loss of high-paying manufacturing jobs, health care crises in emergency rooms on the borders, education problems in border state districts, and other socio-economic problems.

=== Arrested members ===
The first time that Simcox was arrested by federal park rangers on a stretch along the Arizona-Mexico border. Simcox was armed with a single pistol, police scanner radios, and was charged with a misdemeanor, subsequently serving a year on probation. His principal objective was clear, stop the illegal Mexican border crossings.

On March 15, 2010, Minuteman Civil Defense Corps President Carmen Mercer sent an e-mail to the group's members in which she stated,

"For eight long years we Minutemen played nice; yet for the past eight years we firmly expressed our opinions and desires for the border to be secured. This muster will be completely different. President Barack Obama and John McCain have left us no choice. This March we return to the border locked, loaded and ready to stop each and every individual we encounter along the frontier that is now more dangerous than the frontier of Afghanistan."

After receiving what she described as a "dramatic" response from members who promised to return to the border armed, Mercer called for the dissolution of the group on March 23 citing her concern of being held responsible should members fail to follow the proper "rules of engagement".

On June 8, 2016, Minuteman Civil Defense Corps co-founder Chris Simcox was found guilty of child molestation, and on July 11, 2016, was sentenced to serve 19.5 years in an Arizona prison. One of the founders J.T. Ready had twice been caught in 2011 forcibly detaining immigrants, and was under investigation by the FBI, who were looking into a potential domestic terrorism situation involving immigrants found shot to death in the desert.
