= Minuteman Project =

American activist organization

- Leader: Jim Gilchrist
- Dates active: April 2005–present
- Active regions: United States: Arizona, Florida, Illinois, New Mexico, Texas (in the organization's peak time)
- Ideology: American nationalism Anti-immigrant sentiment
- Size: 1,200 volunteers (claimed)

The Minuteman Project is an anti-immigration activist and vigilante organization which was founded in the United States in August 2004 by a group of private individuals who sought to extrajudicially monitor the United States–Mexico border's flow of illegal immigrants. Founded by Jim Gilchrist and Chris Simcox, the organization's name is derived from the name of the Minutemen, militiamen who fought in the American Revolution. The Minuteman Project describes itself as "a citizens' Neighborhood Watch on our border", and it has attracted the attention of the media due to its focus on the issue of illegal immigration.

In addition to border watching, the Minuteman Project created a political action committee which lobbied for representatives who supported proactive immigration law enforcement and focused on resolving border security issues. Members of the Minuteman Project believe that government officials have failed to protect the country from the threat of invasion by foreign enemies. They strongly support building a wall and placing additional border patrol agents or military personnel on the Mexico–United States border to curb free movement across it. Roughly half of the Minuteman Project's members strongly oppose amnesty as well as a guest worker program, and an overwhelming number of them oppose sending funds to Mexico to pay for the improvement of its infrastructure.

== History ==
=== First border watch ===
In early 2005, Gilchrist and Simcox rallied over 1,200 volunteers to carry out the first border watch. For one month, activists guarded the 23-mile long stretch of the Arizona-Mexico border, kept count of the number of migrants who approached it, reported their presence, and prevented them from crossing it by scaring them away. Many of the activists came from Utah, and soon afterward, they joined forces with local groups to form the Utah Minuteman Project (UMP), which focused on raising public awareness with regard to the "threat of immigration" through local media and public debates.

=== T-shirt incident ===
On April 6, 2005, three Minuteman Project volunteers convinced a 25-year-old immigrant to hold a T-shirt and pose for a photograph and a video with one of the volunteers. The T‑shirt, which was also worn by volunteer Bryan Barton, read "Bryan Barton caught me crossing the border and all I got was this lousy T-shirt".

The volunteer approached the young man near a main highway while he was off duty from patrolling. He then contacted the Border Patrol. He gave $20 to the man as the U.S. Border Patrol arrived and took the man into custody. Critics of the MMP raised questions about the incident, but an investigation by the Cochise County Sheriff's office cleared the volunteer of any wrongdoing. The Border Patrol and the Mexican consul both agreed that no crime had been committed.

The ACLU issued a press release concerning this incident.

=== Garden Grove incident ===
On May 25, 2005, James Gilchrist spoke in Garden Grove, California, to the California Coalition for Immigration Reform at the Garden Grove Women's Club. Hal Netkin, a Minuteman collaborator, came to the event. Netkin's car was surrounded as he arrived at the location and demonstrators allegedly rocked the vehicle and banged on it. Garden Grove Police Lt. Mike Handfield claimed that some of the 300 demonstrators were there "not to protest but to commit criminal acts" and he also claimed that "A small contingent of people that were troublemakers had backpacks filled with full cans of soda that they were throwing and also cans filled with marbles that they threw." Lt. Handfield claimed that, "We determined it was reasonable for him to move forward" through the crowd surrounding his car. Two people who were standing in front of Netkin's car fell down when he moved forward. Both went to the hospital. The police declared an illegal assembly. "It got out of control in terms of protesters getting violent", Lt. Handfield said. Jan Tucker, who accompanied state and local leaders of the League of United Latin American Citizens to the talk, stated that the crowd outside the building was peaceful.

=== Stopping aid to undocumented immigrants on the border ===
In January 2006, the actions of the California Minutemen helped influence the cancellation of a program which was sponsored by Humane Borders and the government of Mexico with the purpose of supplying over 70,000 maps to migrants to aid their illegal entry into the United States. The maps were not designed to encourage illegal entry into the country, instead, they were aimed at mitigating death and injury by mapping out the positions of water stations, rescue beacons and recorded deaths. However, Miguel Angel Paredes, a spokesman for Mexico's National Human Rights Commission said "this would be practically like telling the Minutemen where the migrants are going to be" and as such, they'd have to "rethink this, so that we wouldn't almost be handing them over to groups that attack migrants".

=== August 2007 fake murder video ===
In August 2007, the Southern Poverty Law Center reported on the surfacing of two videos which depicted the murder of an alleged illegal immigrant by two Minutemen along the Mexico/California border. These videos appeared briefly on YouTube but were removed. In this video, a figure is videotaped in night vision being shot while two narrators exchange obscene comments expressing satisfaction about doing so.

A few days later, Minuteman representatives who were interviewed by reporters who worked for a San Diego TV station alleged that the videos were fakes which were made by members of the Mountain Minutemen group. Robert "Little Dog" Crooks, who admitted making the video, said "we're old men and we're bored" and said he made the video to express a political opinion about an immigration bill being debated. Minuteman Project leader Jim Gilchrist would later ban cooperation by members of his group with the Mountain Minutemen in response to the video incident.

== Support ==
On April 28, 2005, the then California governor Arnold Schwarzenegger praised the Minuteman Project during an interview on The John and Ken Show on the Los Angeles radio station KFI, by saying that the group had been doing "a terrific job". He reiterated his supportive comments the following day, by stating that the Minutemen would be welcome to patrol the border between California and Mexico.

Other supporters have included the Council of Conservative Citizens, national radio hosts Sean Hannity and Michael Savage, and Tennessee radio host James Edwards.

Discussions which were held during the 2016 presidential election with regard to the building of a wall and mass deportation directly aligned with the Minuteman Project's missions. Gilchrist stated that he felt that his goals were reaffirmed and accomplished upon his observation of such widespread awareness with regard to immigration issues. He initially supported Ted Cruz for president, who openly criticized Barack Obama's policy of amnesty and was a consistent opponent against Obama's push for immigration reform.

== Criticism ==
The Minuteman Project has generated controversy, drawing criticism from former Mexican President Vicente Fox and former United States President George W. Bush, who expressed dislike for "vigilante" border projects. In 2005, James Gilchrist said he had been told that the Latino criminal organization MS13 had "issued orders to teach 'a lesson'" to the Minutemen. The Minuteman Project and its chapters have been called an extreme nativist group by the Southern Poverty Law Center, and the Anti-Defamation League has observed that Neo-Nazi and white supremacist groups have campaigned alongside them. The ADL reported that an official connection between these groups has been established. In December 2005 James Chase turned over leadership of the California Minutemen (CMM) & the national Border Watch Federation (BWF) to his son, Mike Chase. Recruits, operations and the influence of the California Minutemen continued to grow, and the North County Times complained of Mike Chase's appointment to the political steering committee of California Senator Bill Morrow's campaign for the 50th District Congressional seat vacated by Randy "Duke" Cunningham.

In a June 2008 interview with the OC Register, Jim Gilchrist stated, "Am I happy at the outcome of this whole movement? I am very, very sad, very disappointed". He also added, "There's all kinds of organizations that have spawned from the Minuteman Project and I have to say, some of the people who have gotten into this movement have sinister intentions. ... I have found, after four years in this movement ... I very well may have been fighting for people with less character and less integrity than the 'open border fanatics' I have been fighting against", Gilchrist concluded. "And that is a phenomenal indictment of something I have created."

== Internal strife ==
Members of an advisory board for the Minuteman Project, Inc. took control of the organization's bank account and, at least temporarily, took control of the Minuteman Project's main web site, Jim Gilchrist filed a lawsuit in Orange County, California, against three of the members of the group that claimed to be members of a board of directors: Marvin Stewart, Deborah Courtney and Barbara Coe.

Stewart, Courtney and Coe alleged that they constituted the board of directors of Minuteman Project, Inc. and fired Gilchrist for a variety of reasons. Gilchrist fired Stewart and Courtney. Rather than accept their termination, Stewart and Courtney filed papers with the Secretary of State of Delaware saying that they were the board of directors and Officers of the Corporation.

Stewart and Courtney are defendants in another action which was brought against them by the Minuteman Project. At one point, the former volunteers could not afford to pay for legal counsel because they ran out of money and as a result, they were forced to represent themselves in court. That trial began on January 4, 2010. On February 5, 2010, Judge Wilkinson issued a Statement of Decision which found that Stewart and Courtney were legally fired from the Minuteman Project, Inc. on February 2, 2007. The February meeting was properly noticed, the purpose of the special meeting (the firing of Courtney, Coe and Stewart) was noticed, and Courtney, Coe and Stewart were in attendance at the meeting. The court ruled that in previous meetings, the pair's purported firings of other members of the board were lacking – in that they neither gave notice, nor did they have a quorum and the directors lacked authority. At that meeting, Barbara Coe resigned her position (giving her resignation from MMP, Inc. to Jim Gilchrist, its president) and Stewart and Courtney were fired. Judge Wilkinson ruled that the two defendants were legally terminated from the board of MMP on February 2, 2007, and "under no circumstances" are they board members after February 2, 2007. He issued a permanent injunction against their claim that they are board members, officers, members or spokespersons for the Minuteman Project, called for them to remove any websites which make those false claims, and finally ordered them to return to MMP any of its property which they have in their possession.

The ruling affirmed Gilchrist's position as head of the Minuteman Project, Inc. and its successor organization Jim Gilchrist's Minuteman Project, Inc.

== Monitors ==
Various media representatives, the American Civil Liberties Union (ACLU) and observers from the Anti-Defamation League (ADL) are also in the patrol zone attempting to observe Minutemen volunteers at work. In November 2006, the ACLU released a report in which it detailed the Minuteman Campaign and stated that a large number of daily newspapers "wildly exaggerated" the number of volunteers who actually participated in the group's operation in southeastern Arizona in April 2005.

Individuals who claimed to be members of the Minuteman Project's board of directors claimed that they removed Gilchrist as the head of the Minuteman Project amid allegations of fraud and financial mismanagement, but a representative of the Delaware Secretary of State told the Los Angeles Times that only Gilchrist could make those changes. In a May 2007 interview, Gilchrist claimed: "I'm the President and always was. I got the corporation back. I have the right to the web site, the bank account, everything. We are back in the same position as we were prior to the hijacking." Judge Wilkinson issued an interim ruling barring the board members from spending Minuteman Project donations until Gilchrist's lawsuit is resolved. In April 2007, Gilchrist announced the formation of a new non-profit corporation, named Jim Gilchrist's Minuteman Project, Inc.

== See also ==
- Border Film Project
