= Sam Coppersmith =

American politician (born 1955)

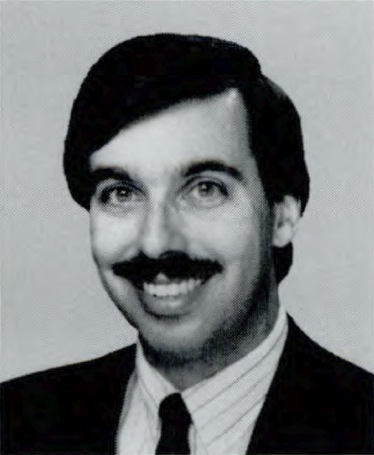
- Official portrait, 1993

Chair of the Arizona Democratic Party
- In office 1995–1997
- Preceded by: Steve Owens
- Succeeded by: Mark Fleisher

Member of the U.S. House of Representatives from Arizona's 1st district
- In office January 3, 1993 – January 3, 1995
- Preceded by: John Jacob Rhodes III
- Succeeded by: Matt Salmon

Personal details
- Born: Samuel George Coppersmith; May 22, 1955 (age 71) Johnstown, Pennsylvania, U.S.
- Party: Democratic
- Parent: Louis Coppersmith (father)
- Education: Harvard University (AB); Yale University (JD)
- Website: Official website

Samuel George Coppersmith (born May 22, 1955) is an American attorney and former politician who served as the U.S. representative for Arizona's 1st congressional district from 1993 to 1995. He is a member of the Democratic Party.

== Early years ==
Coppersmith was born May 22, 1955, in Johnstown, Pennsylvania. His father, Louis Coppersmith, was a state senator representing Johnstown from 1969 to 1981. He graduated magna cum laude from Harvard University in 1976, and then worked as a Foreign Service Officer with the U.S. State Department, assigned to the U.S. Embassy in Port of Spain, Trinidad and Tobago. He returned to the U.S. then earned a J.D. from Yale Law School in 1982. After law school, he clerked for Judge William C. Canby Jr., of the U.S. Court of Appeals for the Ninth Circuit, and served as an assistant to the Mayor of Phoenix.

== House of Representatives ==
In 1992, Coppersmith won the Democratic primary in Arizona's 1st District and faced three-term Republican Jay Rhodes in the general election. Coppersmith won the elections and became a U.S. Representative from the Democratic Party for Arizona's 1st Congressional District.

== Senate race ==
In 1994, Coppersmith gave up his seat after only one term to run for the U.S. Senate when Dennis DeConcini retired. In the Democratic race to replace the retiring DeConcini, Rep. Sam Coppersmith won with a razor-thin margin of 32 votes (81,547 votes vs 81,515 for Richard Mahoney). He subsequently lost to fellow Congressman Jon Kyl by 14 points.

== Private law practice ==
After leaving Congress, Coppersmith spent two years as the chairman of the Arizona Democratic Party. He is as of 2013 an attorney specializing in real estate law and a managing partner of the law firm of Coppersmith Schermer & Brockelman PLC. He has a blog called LiberalDesert.

== See also ==
- List of Jewish members of the United States Congress

U.S. House of Representatives
Preceded by John Rhodes III	Member of the U.S. House of Representatives from Arizona's 1st congressional district 1993–1995	Succeeded by Matt Salmon
Party political offices
Preceded by Dennis DeConcini	Democratic nominee for U.S. Senator from Arizona (Class 1); 1994	Succeeded by Jim Pederson
U.S. order of precedence (ceremonial)
Preceded by Yvette Herrell as Former U.S. Representative	Order of precedence of the United States as Former U.S. Representative	Succeeded by Karan English as Former U.S. Representative
