= List of diplomatic missions of Trinidad and Tobago =

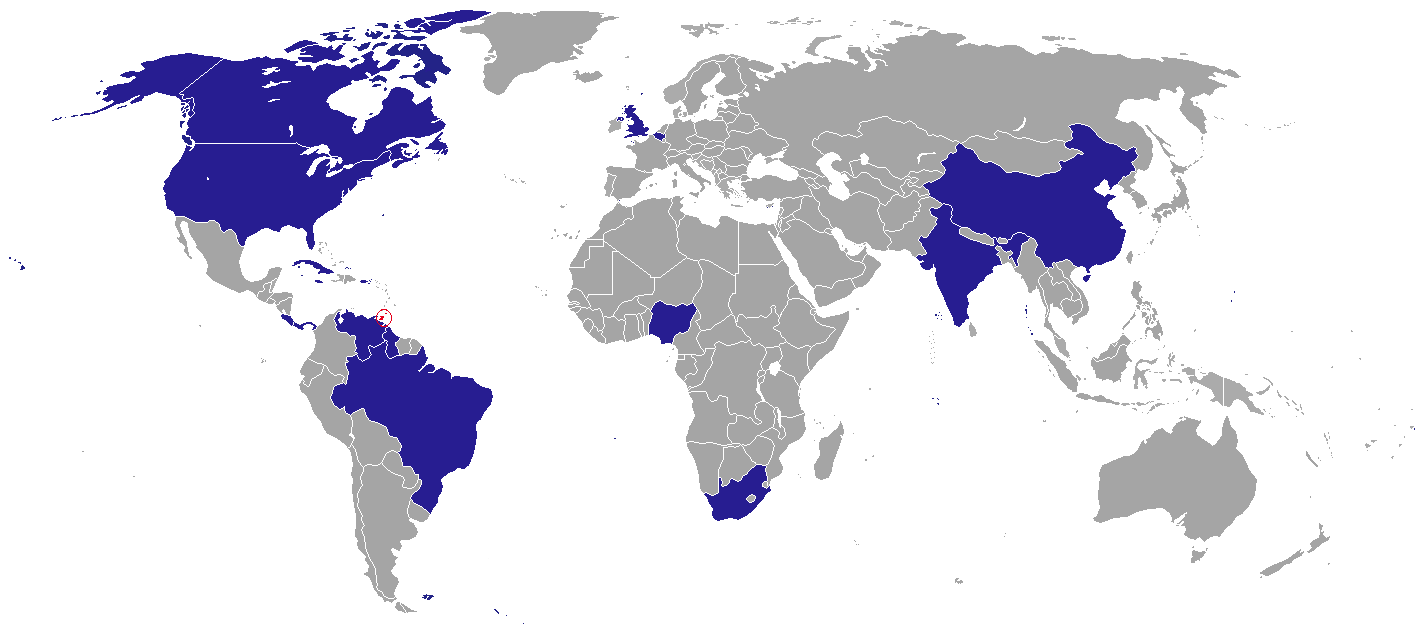
Location of diplomatic missions of Trinidad and Tobago Republic of Trinidad and Tobago Countries that host an Embassy or High Commission

This is a list of diplomatic missions of Trinidad and Tobago, excluding honorary consulates. Trinidad and Tobago is a twin island country located in the southernmost end of the Caribbean.

In February 2020 the two Heads of Government for both the Republic of Trinidad and Tobago and Barbados initialed several agreements including one which would see the sharing of various chanceries around the world.

== Current missions ==
=== Africa ===
Host country	Host city	Mission	Concurrent accreditation	Ref.
Nigeria	Abuja	High Commission	Countries: Algeria; Cameroon; Congo-Kinshasa; Ethiopia; Ghana; Guinea; Ivory Coast; Kenya; Liberia; Nigeria; Senegal; Sierra Leone; Tanzania; Uganda; International Organizations: African Union (Note: Accredited as an observer mission.); Economic Community of West African States	
South Africa	Pretoria	High Commission	Countries: Angola; Eswatini; Madagascar; Malawi; Mauritius; Mozambique; Namibia; Zambia; Zimbabwe	

=== Americas ===
Host country	Host city	Mission	Concurrent accreditation	Ref.
Brazil	Brasília	Embassy	Countries: Argentina; Chile; Paraguay; Uruguay	
Canada	Ottawa	High Commission		
Canada	Toronto	Consulate-General		
Costa Rica	San José	Embassy	Countries: Guatemala	
Cuba	Havana	Embassy		
Guyana	Georgetown	High Commission	Countries: Suriname; Multilateral Organizations: Caribbean Community	
Jamaica	Kingston	High Commission	Countries: Dominican Republic; Haiti; International Organizations: International Seabed Authority	
Panama	Panama City	Embassy		
United States	Washington, D.C.	Embassy	Countries: Mexico; Multilateral Organizations: Organization of American States	
United States	Miami	Consulate-General	Countries: Mexico; Multilateral Organizations: Organization of American States	
United States	New York City	Consulate-General	Countries: Mexico; Multilateral Organizations: Organization of American States	
Venezuela	Caracas	Embassy	Countries: Ecuador; Peru	

=== Asia ===
Host country	Host city	Mission	Concurrent accreditation	Ref.
China	Beijing	Embassy	Countries: Brunei; Cambodia; Malaysia; Philippines; South Korea; Thailand; Vietnam	
India	New Delhi	High Commission	Countries: Bangladesh; Indonesia; Japan; Singapore; Sri Lanka	

=== Europe ===
Host country	Host city	Mission	Concurrent accreditation	Ref.
Belgium	Brussels	Embassy	Countries: France; Holy See; Luxembourg; Netherlands; Spain; Switzerland; Multilateral Organizations: European Union; Organisation of African, Caribbean and Pacific States; Organisation for the Prohibition of Chemical Weapons	
United Kingdom	London	High Commission	Countries: Denmark; Finland; Germany; Norway; Sweden; Multilateral Organizations: Commonwealth of Nations; International Maritime Organization	

=== Multilateral organisations ===
Organization	Host city	Host country	Mission	Concurrent accreditation	Ref.
United Nations	New York City	United States	Permanent Mission		
United Nations	Geneva	Switzerland	Permanent Mission	Countries: Austria; Italy; Multilateral Organizations: Food and Agriculture Organization; International Atomic Energy Agency; International Fund for Agricultural Development; International Organization for Migration; UNESCO; United Nations Industrial Development Organization; United Nations Office on Drugs and Crime; World Food Programme; World Health Organization; World Meteorological Organization; World Trade Organization	

== Gallery ==
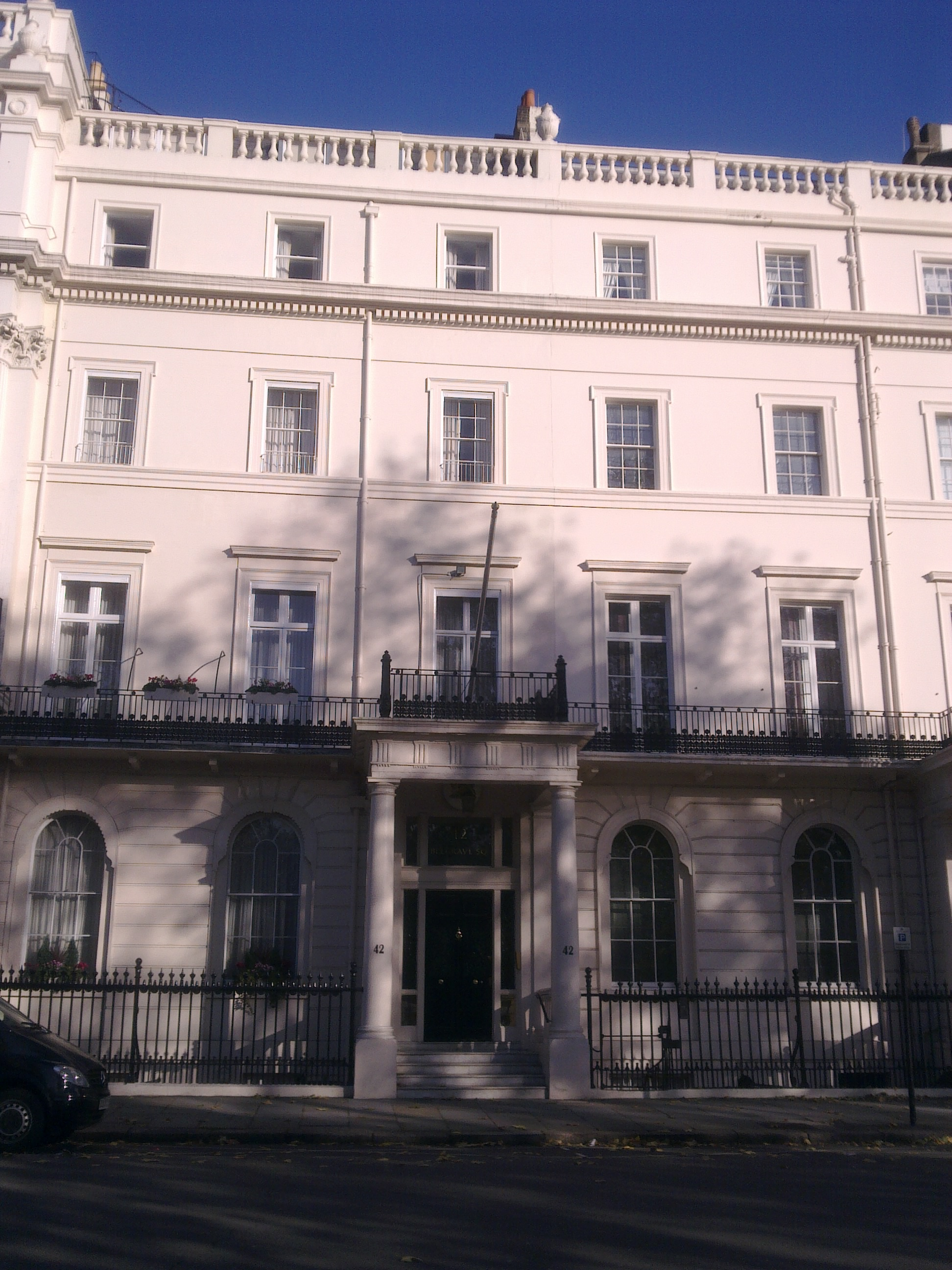
High Commission in London

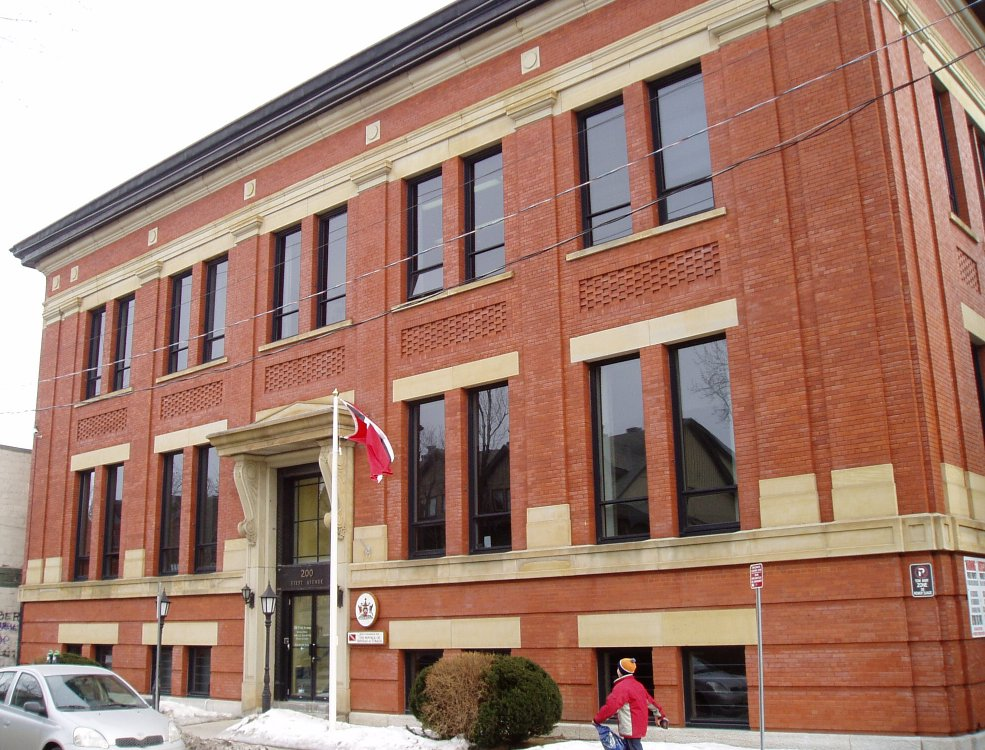
High Commission in Ottawa

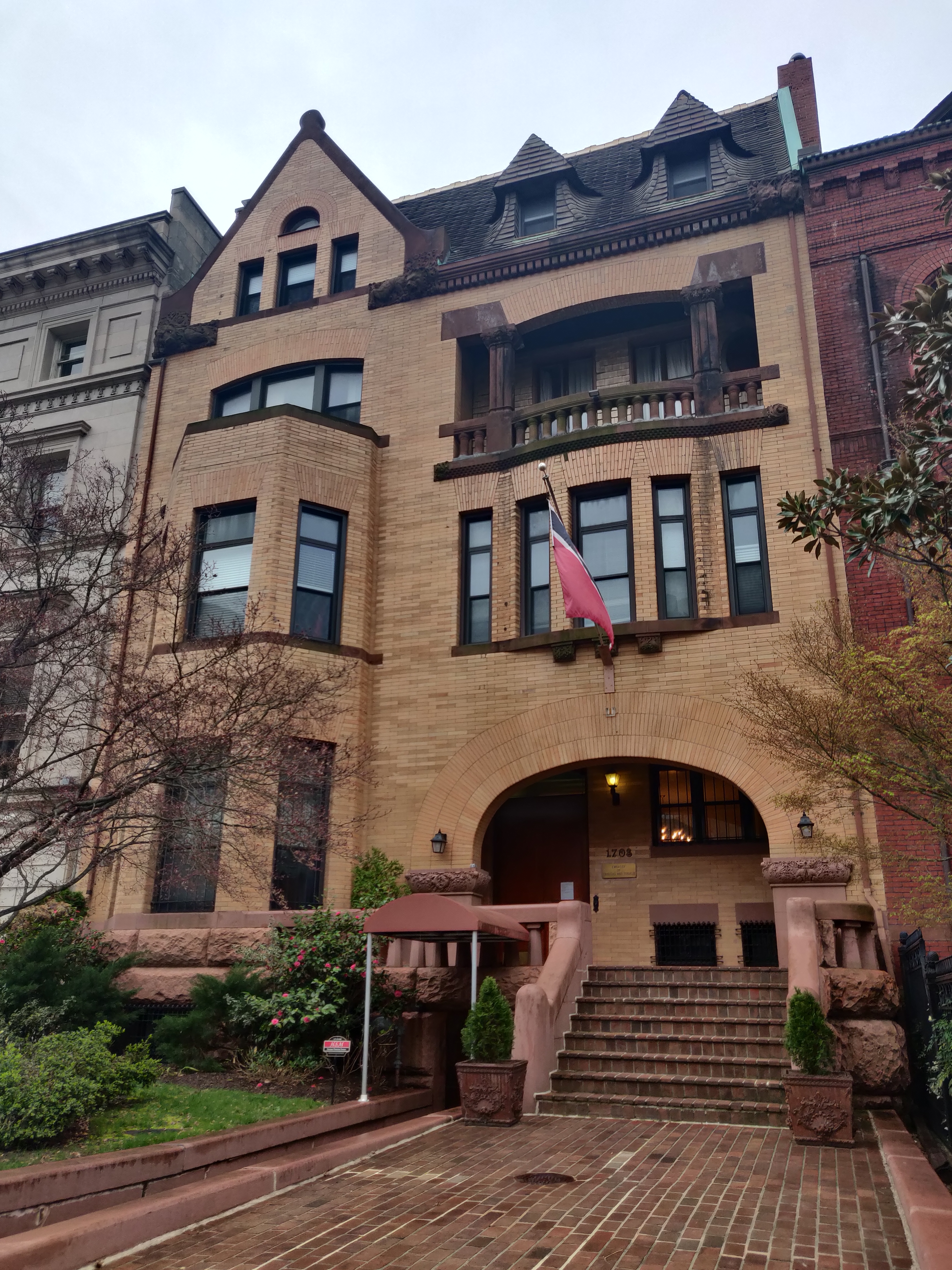
Embassy in Washington, D.C.

== Closed missions ==
=== Africa ===
Host country	Host city	Mission	Year closed	Ref.
Uganda	Kampala	High Commission (Note: Resident in Abuja, Federal Capital Territory, Nigeria)	2016	

=== Americas ===
Host country	Host city	Mission	Year closed	Ref.
Barbados	Bridgetown	High Commission	1995	

== See also ==
- Foreign relations of Trinidad and Tobago
- List of diplomatic missions in Trinidad and Tobago
- Visa policy of Trinidad and Tobago
