= Louis Coppersmith =

American politician

W. Louis Coppersmith

Member of the Pennsylvania Senate from the 35th district
- In office May 26, 1969 – November 30, 1980
- Preceded by: Richard Green
- Succeeded by: Mark Singel

Personal details
- Born: June 19, 1928 Johnstown, Pennsylvania
- Died: January 15, 1989 (aged 60) Johnstown, Pennsylvania
- Children: Sam Coppersmith
- Education: University of Pennsylvania (BA); Harvard Law School (JD)

W. Louis Coppersmith (June 19, 1928 – January 15, 1989) was a member of the Pennsylvania State Senate, serving from 1969 to 1980. He and fellow Senator Quentin Orlando were the main sponsors of the "Diagnostic Drug Bill." He was the chair of the Public Health and Welfare Committee.

His son, Sam, served in the United States House of Representatives from Arizona's 1st congressional district from 1993 to 1995.
