= 1978 State of the Union Address =

Speech by US President Jimmy Carter

- Date: January 19, 1978
- Time: 9:00 p.m. EST
- Duration: 46 minutes
- Venue: House Chamber, United States Capitol
- Location: Washington, D.C.; 38°53′23″N 77°00′32″W
- Type: State of the Union Address
- Participants: Jimmy Carter; Walter Mondale; Tip O'Neill
- Previous: 1977 State of the Union Address
- Next: 1979 State of the Union Address

The 1978 State of the Union address was given by President Jimmy Carter to a joint session of the 95th United States Congress on January 19, 1978.

The speech lasted 46 minutes and 4 seconds and contained 4580 words.

The Republican Party response was delivered by Senator Howard Baker Jr. (TN) and Representative John Rhodes (AZ).

One reviewer noted the blandness of the speech, commenting that "Carter avoided the kind of dramatic new proposals that other Presidents in similar circumstances have put before legislators of their own party."

In domestic affairs, the President noted that the economy of the United States crossed the $2 trillion mark, a first in human history. The president advocated for the creation of the Department of Education, and consolidation of 11 agencies into a new Department of Energy.

In foreign policy, the President emphasized the importance of arms reductions talks, especially in chemical weaponry.

== See also ==
- United States House of Representatives elections, 1978

Preceded by 1977 State of the Union Address	State of the Union addresses 1978	Succeeded by 1979 State of the Union Address
