= 1980 State of the Union Address =

Speech by US President Jimmy Carter

- Date: January 23, 1980
- Time: 9:00 p.m. EST
- Duration: 32 minutes
- Venue: House Chamber, United States Capitol
- Location: Washington, D.C.; 38°53′23″N 77°00′32″W
- Type: State of the Union Address
- Participants: Jimmy Carter; Walter Mondale; Tip O'Neill
- Previous: 1979 State of the Union Address
- Next: 1981 State of the Union Address

The 1980 State of the Union address was given by President Jimmy Carter, the 39th president of the United States, to a joint session of the 96th United States Congress on January 23, 1980. Carter addressed the Iran Hostage Crisis and the Soviet invasion of Afghanistan: "At this time in Iran, 50 Americans are still held captive, innocent victims of terrorism and anarchy. Also at this moment, massive Soviet troops are attempting to subjugate the fiercely independent and deeply religious people of Afghanistan."

The speech lasted 32 minutes and 4 seconds. and contained 3412 words.

The Republican Party response was delivered by Senator Ted Stevens (AK) and Representative John Rhodes (AZ).

In additional matters, the President noted the continued increase in price of OPEC oil, which he related to a cause of increased inflation. The normalization of relations with the People's Republic of China was also announced.

== See also ==
- 1980 United States presidential election

Preceded by 1979 State of the Union Address	State of the Union addresses 1980	Succeeded by 1981 State of the Union Address
