= John Jacob Rhodes =

American politician (1916–2003)

John Rhodes
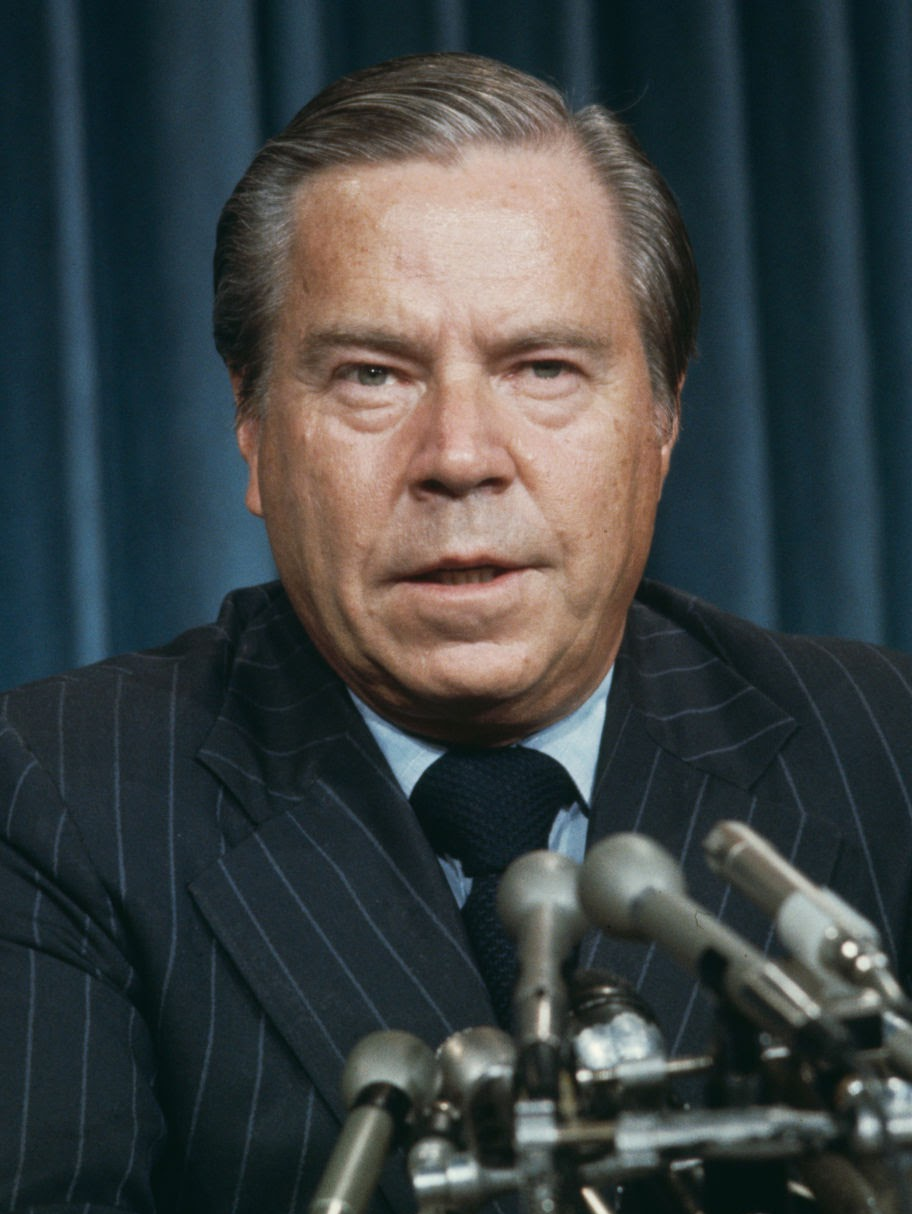
- Rhodes in 1974

House Minority Leader
- In office December 7, 1973 – January 3, 1981
- Deputy: Leslie C. Arends; Bob Michel
- Preceded by: Gerald Ford
- Succeeded by: Bob Michel

Leader of the House Republican Conference
- In office December 7, 1973 – January 3, 1981
- Preceded by: Gerald Ford
- Succeeded by: Bob Michel

Chair of the House Republican Policy Committee
- In office January 3, 1965 – December 7, 1973
- Leader: Gerald Ford
- Preceded by: John W. Byrnes
- Succeeded by: Barber Conable

Member of the U.S. House of Representatives from Arizona's 1st district
- In office January 3, 1953 – January 3, 1983
- Preceded by: John Murdock
- Succeeded by: John McCain

Personal details
- Born: John Jacob Rhodes Jr. September 18, 1916 Council Grove, Kansas, U.S.
- Died: August 24, 2003 (aged 86) Mesa, Arizona, U.S.
- Party: Republican
- Spouse: Betty Harvey
- Children: 5, including Jay
- Education: Kansas State University (BA); Harvard University (LLB)

Military service
- Allegiance: United States
- Branch/service: United States Army; United States Air Force
- Years of service: 1941–1952
- Unit: U.S. Army Air Corps; U.S. Army Air Forces; Arizona Air National Guard

John Jacob Rhodes Jr. (September 18, 1916 – August 24, 2003) was an American lawyer and politician. A member of the Republican Party, Rhodes served as a U.S. representative from Arizona for thirty years from 1953 to 1983. He was the minority leader in the House of Representatives from 1973 to 1981 and pressed a conservative agenda.

== Early life ==
Rhodes was born in Council Grove, Kansas. He met Calvin Coolidge at the age of eleven and, after shaking hands with the president, reportedly refused to wash his hand for a week. He attended public schools and in 1938 graduated from Kansas State University in Manhattan, Kansas, where he was a member of Beta Theta Pi fraternity and also earned his U.S. Army Reserve commission via the Reserve Officers Training Corps (ROTC). In 1941, he graduated from Harvard Law School, in Cambridge, Massachusetts, and was called to active duty with the United States Army Air Corps, later redesignated the United States Army Air Forces.

== Career ==
He served at Williams Field, Arizona, from 1941 to 1946. After the war, he chose to settle in Arizona with his wife, Elizabeth. From 1947 to 1952, he was the staff judge advocate of the Arizona Air National Guard, and from 1951 to 1952, he served as vice chairman of the Arizona Board of Public Welfare.

=== Political career ===
In 1950, Rhodes ran for Attorney General of Arizona as a Republican. His friend, Barry Goldwater, correctly predicted that Rhodes would lose; at that time, Arizona was over seventy-five percent Democratic. In 1952, Rhodes ran again, this time for Arizona's 1st congressional district, which then had all of Phoenix and surrounding Maricopa County. Despite limited campaign funds and facing the powerful eleven-term Democratic incumbent, John Murdock, Rhodes prevailed by eight percent of the vote and was elected to the Eighty-third United States Congress. He was the first Republican ever elected to represent Arizona in the House. Additionally, he was a member of the Arizona delegation to several Republican National Conventions, Barry Goldwater's personal representative on the Platform Committee in 1964, chairman of the Platform Committee in 1972, and Permanent Chairman of the Convention in 1976 and 1980.

Rhodes remained in office for thirty consecutive years (January 3, 1953–January 3, 1983), serving in the 83rd to 97th Congresses. His committee assignments included the following: Education and Labor (1953 – 1959); Interior and Insular Affairs (1953 – 1959); Appropriations, on which he became ranking minority member of the Public Works and Defense Subcommittees (1959 – 1973); Budget (1974 – 1975); Rules (1981 – 1983); and was chairman of the House Republican Policy Committee (1965 – 1973). Rhodes was elected by acclamation to be House Minority Leader on December 7, 1973, succeeding Gerald Ford when Ford became Vice President. However, House Republicans became unhappy with his strong but low-key leadership, and in 1979, he announced he would not seek re-election as leader. Minority Whip Bob Michel replaced him in 1981, but Rhodes remained in the House for that Congress, which he later termed a mistake.

Over the years, Rhodes became very popular in his district even though many of its residents had never been represented by a Republican before. He fended off a close contest for reelection in 1954 but was not seriously challenged again until 1974, when anger at Watergate held him to only 51 percent of the vote. His district became even safer after a mid-decade redistricting in 1966 cut it back to the fast-growing and strongly-conservative East Valley, including his home in Mesa.

Rhodes' biggest two accomplishments in Congress were being the driving force behind congressional authorization of the Central Arizona Project, which provides water from the Colorado River to Arizona, and his presence at the August 7, 1974 meeting with President Richard Nixon at which he, Goldwater, and Senator Hugh Scott informed Nixon that the President no longer had enough support in Congress to prevent his impeachment and removal from office. (The President announced his resignation the next day.) Rhodes voted in favor of the Civil Rights Acts of 1957 and 1960, as well as the 24th Amendment to the U.S. Constitution and the Voting Rights Act of 1965. Rhodes voted against the initial House resolution for the Civil Rights Act of 1964 on February 10, 1964, but voted in favor of the Senate amendment to the bill on July 2, 1964. Rhodes voted in favor of the House resolution for the Civil Rights Act of 1968 on August 16, 1967, but voted against the Senate amendment to the bill on April 10, 1968. Rhodes also supported the Family Assistance Plan and the Equal Rights Amendment.

Rhodes himself had maintained his support for the president until the release of the "smoking gun" tape. Saying that "coverup of criminal activity and misuse of federal agencies cannot be condoned or tolerated," Rhodes said that he would vote to impeach Nixon when the articles came up for vote in the full House. In short order, all ten Republicans on the House Judiciary Committee announced they would follow suit and vote for impeachment on the full House floor. According to his obituary in The Washington Post, the decision of the House leader of Nixon's own party to break with Nixon and support impeachment was the "coup de grace" for Nixon.

=== Book ===
In 1976, Rhodes wrote a book, The Futile System: How to Unchain Congress and Make the System Work Again, which argued that effective Congressional reforms "cannot be accomplished by the majority party.... The ins have little incentive to change. It is the outs -- the powerless minority -- who have the only real motivation to take a critical look at the system and determine a better way to run things."

=== Retirement ===
Rhodes retired from Congress in 1982 at age 66. Though still popular in his home district, Rhodes reasoned that "if [he were] ever going to do something else, [he] should get started doing it." His retirement opened the door to a hotly-contested Republican primary, which was won by John McCain. McCain went on to victory in November and would be elected to the Senate four years later.

== Later life ==
After leaving Congress, Rhodes maintained an apartment in Bethesda, Maryland, to which he commuted from his home in Mesa. He practiced law in the Washington office of the Richmond, Virginia-based firm of Hunton & Williams. He also traveled extensively, worldwide; was a board member of the Taft Institute for Government and the Hoover Institution for War, Revolution, and Peace; and served on the board of and was elected president of the United States Association of Former Members of Congress.

On August 14, 2003, Speaker of the House Dennis Hastert awarded Rhodes one of the first Congressional Distinguished Service Medals. Rhodes, one of only a handful to obtain the award, remarked to Hastert that the speaker was the only job that Rhodes had ever really wanted.

== Personal life ==
In 1942, Rhodes was married to Elizabeth ("Betty") Harvey.

He died at his Mesa home, surrounded by family, on August 24, 2003, from complications related to cancer. He was survived by his wife of sixty-one years, Betty; the children John Jacob ("Jay") III, Thomas, Elizabeth, and James Scott ("Scott"); twelve grandchildren; and several great-grandchildren. Over 100 newspapers carried his obituary. President George W. Bush delivered a statement via the White House's website.

Rhodes Junior High School, in Mesa, Arizona, is named in his honor. The CAP Hayden-Rhodes Aqueduct was also named after him due to his part in its creation.

== Sources ==
- Rhodes, John J. I Was There. Salt Lake City, UT: Northwest Publishing, 1995.

U.S. House of Representatives
| Preceded by John Murdock | Member of the U.S. House of Representatives from Arizona's 1st congressional district 1953–1983 | Succeeded by John McCain |
| Preceded by Gerald Ford | House Minority Leader; 1973–1981 | Succeeded by Bob Michel |
Party political offices
| Preceded by John W. Byrnes | Chair of the House Republican Policy Committee; 1965–1973 | Succeeded by Barber Conable |
| Preceded by Gerald Ford | House Republican Leader; 1973–1981 | Succeeded by Bob Michel |
| Vacant Title last held by Ed Muskie | Response to the State of the Union address 1978, 1979, 1980; Served alongside: Howard Baker (1978, 1979), Ted Stevens (1980) | Vacant Title next held by Robert Byrd, Alan Cranston, Al Gore, Gary Hart, Bennett Johnston, Ted Kennedy, Tip O'Neill, Don Riegle, Paul Sarbanes, Jim Sasser; 1982 |
