= Jay Rhodes (politician) =

American politician (1943–2011)

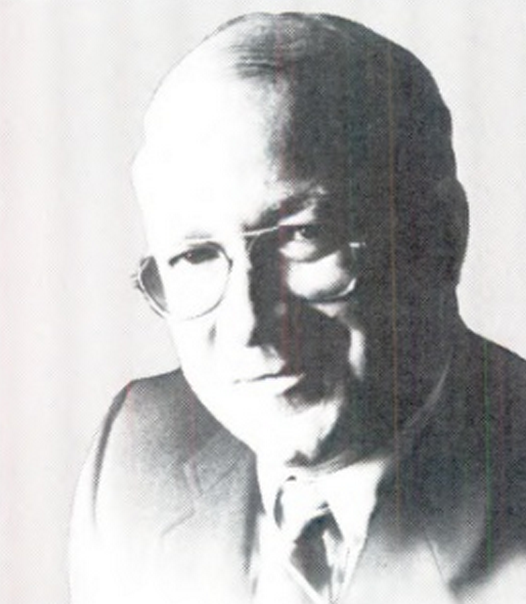
- Rhodes, c. 1989

Member of the U.S. House of Representatives from Arizona's 1st district
- In office January 3, 1987 – January 3, 1993
- Preceded by: John McCain
- Succeeded by: Sam Coppersmith

Personal details
- Born: John Jacob Rhodes III; September 8, 1943 Mesa, Arizona, U.S.
- Died: January 20, 2011 (aged 67) Washington, D.C., U.S.
- Party: Republican
- Spouse: Jane Rhodes
- Children: 4
- Parent: John Jacob Rhodes (father)
- Education: Yale University (BA); University of Arizona (JD)

Military service
- Branch/service: United States Army
- Years of service: 1968–1970
- Rank: Captain
- Battles/wars: Vietnam War

John Jacob "Jay" Rhodes III (September 8, 1943 – January 20, 2011) was an American politician who was a Republican representative from Arizona's 1st congressional district.

== Youth and education ==
Rhodes was born in Mesa, Arizona. His father and namesake, John Jacob Rhodes, represented the 1st district from 1953 to 1983. As a result, the younger Rhodes spent much of his youth in Washington, D. C. He graduated from the Landon School in Bethesda, Maryland (1961); graduated from Yale University in New Haven, Connecticut (1965) with an A.B., and from the University of Arizona College of Law in Tucson, Arizona with a J.D. (1968).

Rhodes joined the United States Army in 1968, served in Vietnam, and left as a captain in 1970. He was admitted to the Arizona State bar in 1968 and commenced practice in Mesa. Rhodes was a Republican district chairman (1972–1982), served on the Mesa Board of Education (1973–1976), and served with Central Arizona Water Conservation District (1983–1986).

== While in Congress ==
After his father's successor, John McCain, was elected to the United States Senate, Rhodes jumped in the Republican primary for his father's seat, anchored in the East Valley. Despite his name recognition in the district, he faced a tough contest in the four-way Republican primary—the real contest in this heavily Republican district. While he won the nomination, it was only by 5,000 votes, and he fell far short of a majority. Nonetheless, he romped to victory in November with 71 percent of the vote. He was reelected almost as easily in 1988, and in 1990 no Democrat even filed to run against him.

Rhodes appeared to be a heavy favorite for a fourth term in 1992. His district had become even more Republican on paper when redistricting shifted several majority-Hispanic neighborhoods in Phoenix to the 2nd District. However, his Democratic challenger, Sam Coppersmith, hammered Rhodes for several ethical lapses. In one of the biggest upsets in Arizona political history, Coppersmith defeated Rhodes by just over six points.

After his defeat, he remained in Washington, D.C.

Rhodes voted against the Abandoned Shipwrecks Act of 1987. The Act asserts United States title to certain abandoned shipwrecks located on or embedded in submerged lands under state jurisdiction, and transfers title to the respective state, thereby empowering states to manage these cultural and historical resources more efficiently, with the goal of preventing treasure hunters and salvagers from damaging them. Despite his vote against it, President Ronald Reagan signed it into law on April 28, 1988.

== Accident and death ==
Rhodes died on January 20, 2011, at the Veterans Administration Medical Center in Washington, D.C. Rhodes had been treated for three fractured vertebrae he sustained in an automobile accident in October 2010. He was found unconscious ten days before his death and began suffering organ failure. He was survived by his wife, Jane, sons John, Taylor, Jeremy, Dennis and Arthur, and mother, Betty Rhodes.

== Notes ==
U.S. House of Representatives
Preceded by John S. McCain III	U.S. Representative for Arizona's 1st congressional district 1987–1993	Succeeded by Samuel G. Coppersmith
