= Visa requirements for Trinidad and Tobago citizens =

Visa requirements for Trinidad and Tobago citizens are administrative entry restrictions by the authorities of other states placed on citizens of Trinidad and Tobago. As of 2026, Trinidad and Tobago citizens had visa-free or visa on arrival access to 145 countries and territories, ranking the Trinidad and Tobago passport 26th, in terms of travel freedom according to the Henley Passport Index. As a member of CARICOM, Trinidad and Tobago passport holders that are skilled nationals with a CSME Certificate have access to freedom of movement in all CARICOM full member states (except The Bahamas and Haiti).

Trinidad and Tobago signed a mutual visa waiver agreement with Schengen Area countries on 28 May 2015 allowing their citizens to travel visa free to all Schengen states as well as associated countries and some territories.

Effective June 6, 2023, citizens of Trinidad and Tobago no longer require a visa to travel to Canada (by air) and may apply for an Electronic Travel Authorization (ETA) providing that they would have held a Canadian visa within the last ten (10) years or hold a valid US non-immigrant visa at the time of application.

== Visa requirement map ==
Visa requirements for citizens of Trinidad and Tobago Trinidad and Tobago Visa not required or Electronic Travel Authorisation Visa available both on arrival or online Visa on arrival eVisa Visa required

== Visa requirements ==
Visa requirements for holders of normal passports travelling for tourist purposes are as follow:

Country	Visa requirement	Allowed stay	Notes (excluding departure fees)
Afghanistan	eVisa		Visa is not required in case born in Afghanistan or can proof that one of their parents is a national of Afghanistan or born in Afghanistan.; e-Visa : Visitors must arrive at Kabul International (KBL).
Albania	Visa not required	90 days	90 days within any 180 day period
Algeria	Visa required		
Andorra	Visa not required		
Angola	Visa not required	30 days	Maximum 3 entries per calendar year
Antigua and Barbuda	Visa not required	6 months	Holders of Caricom Certificate of Skills can stay indefinitely.
Argentina	Visa not required	90 days	
Armenia	eVisa / Visa on arrival	120 days	Obtainable on arrival at Zvartnots International Airport or prior to travel online.
Australia and territories	Online Visa required		May apply online (Online Visitor e600 visa).
Austria	Visa not required	90 days	90 days within any 180 day period in the Schengen Area
Azerbaijan	eVisa	30 days	
Bahamas	Visa not required	3 months	
Bahrain	eVisa / Visa on Arrival	14 days	
Bangladesh	Visa on arrival	30 days	Not available at all entry points.
Barbados	Visa not required	6 months	Holders of Caricom Certificate of Skills can stay indefinitely.
Belarus	Visa required		Visas are issued on arrival at the Minsk International Airport if the support documents were submitted not later than 3 business days before expected date of arrival.
Belgium	Visa not required	90 days	90 days within any 180 day period in the Schengen Area
Belize	Visa not required	6 months	Holders of Caricom Certificate of Skills can stay indefinitely.
Benin	eVisa	30 days	Must have an international vaccination certificate.
Bhutan	eVisa		Must pay 100 USD per person per day for Sustainable Development Fee
Bolivia	Visa on arrival	90 days	
Bosnia and Herzegovina	Visa not required	90 days	
Botswana	Visa not required	90 days	90 days within any year period
Brazil	Visa not required	90 days	
Brunei	Visa required		
Bulgaria	Visa not required	90 days	90 days within any 180 day period in the Schengen Area
Burkina Faso	eVisa	1 month	
Burundi	Visa on arrival	1 month	
Cambodia	eVisa / Visa on arrival	30 days	Visa is also obtainable online.
Cameroon	eVisa	30 days	
Canada	Visa required (conditional eTA)		Legal permanent residents of the United States can enter Canada with their Trinidad and Tobago passports and do not need an ETA.; Citizens of Trinidad and Tobago who hold a valid non-immigrant U.S. visa or who have held a Canadian visa in the past 10 years can apply for eTA when arriving by air. They may not enter Canada by land or sea unless holding a valid visa.
Cape Verde	Visa on arrival		Not available at all entry points.
Central African Republic	Visa required		
Chad	Visa required		
Chile	Visa not required	90 days	
China	Visa required		
Colombia	Visa not required	90 days	90 days - extendable up to 180-days stay within a one-year period
Comoros	Visa on arrival	45 days	
Republic of the Congo	Visa required		
Democratic Republic of the Congo	eVisa	7 days	
Costa Rica	Visa not required	90 days	
Côte d'Ivoire	eVisa		
Croatia	Visa not required	90 days	90 days within any 180 day period in the Schengen Area
Cuba	Tourist Card / eVisa	90 days	Can be extended up to 180 days
Cyprus	Visa not required	90 days	90 days within any 180 day period
Czech Republic	Visa not required	90 days	90 days within any 180 day period in the Schengen Area
Denmark	Visa not required	90 days	90 days within any 180 day period in the Schengen Area
Djibouti	eVisa / Visa on arrival	31 days	
Dominica	Visa not required	6 months	Holders of Caricom Certificate of Skills can stay indefinitely.
Dominican Republic	Visa not required	30 days	Can be extended up to 120 days with fee
Ecuador	Visa not required	90 days	
Egypt	Visa on arrival	30 days	
El Salvador	Visa not required	180 days	
Equatorial Guinea	eVisa		Must arrive via Malabo International Airport
Eritrea	Visa required		
Estonia	Visa not required	90 days	90 days within any 180 day period in the Schengen Area
Eswatini	Visa not required	30 days	
Ethiopia	eVisa	up to 90 days	eVisa holders must arrive via Addis Ababa Bole International Airport
Fiji	Visa not required	4 months	
Finland	Visa not required	90 days	90 days within any 180 day period in the Schengen Area
France	Visa not required	90 days	90 days within any 180 day period in the Schengen Area
Gabon	eVisa		Electronic visa holders must arrive via Libreville International Airport.
Gambia	Visa not required	90 days	
Georgia	eVisa	90 days	Costs $20 USD
Germany	Visa not required	90 days	90 days within any 180 day period in the Schengen Area
Ghana	Visa not required	60 days	
Greece	Visa not required	90 days	90 days within any 180 day period in the Schengen Area
Grenada	Visa not required	6 months	Holders of Caricom Certificate of Skills can stay indefinitely.; Beginning on December 1, 2020, all travellers to Grenada will be required to complete an online application in order to receive a Pure Safe Travel Authorization Certificate to enter Grenada.
Guatemala	Visa not required	90 days	
Guinea	eVisa	90 days	
Guinea-Bissau	Visa on arrival	90 days	
Guyana	Visa not required	6 months	Holders of Caricom Certificate of Skills can stay indefinitely.
Haiti	Visa not required	3 months	
Honduras	Visa not required	90 days	
Hungary	Visa not required	90 days	90 days within any 180 day period in the Schengen Area
Iceland	Visa not required	90 days	90 days within any 180 day period in the Schengen Area
India	e-Visa	30 days	e-Visa holders must arrive via 32 designated airports (Note: Ahmedabad; Amritsar; Bagdogra; Bengaluru; Bhubaneswar; Chandigarh; Chennai; Coimbatore; Delhi; Gaya; Goa-Dabolim; Goa-Manohar; Guwahati; Hyderabad; Indore; Jaipur; Kannur; Kochi; Kolkata; Kozhikode; Lucknow; Madurai; Mangaluru; Mumbai; Nagpur; Port Blair; Pune; Surat; Thiruvananthapuram; Tiruchirappalli; Varanasi; Visakhapatnam) or 5 designated seaports. (Note: Chennai; Cochin; Mormugao (Goa); Mumbai; Mangalore); An Indian e-Tourist Visa may only be obtained twice within 1 calendar year.; Foreigners of Pakistani origin or who hold a Pakistani Passport are not eligible for an e-Visa. Foreigners who are not Pakistani nationals, but whose parents or grandparents (either paternal or maternal) were born in, or were permanent residents in Pakistan, are also not eligible for an e-Visa.; Must have an international vaccination certificate.
Indonesia	eVisa		
Iran	eVisa	30 days	Extension of stay is possible twice for 30 days for a total of up to 90 days
Iraq	eVisa		
Ireland	Visa required		Ireland Introduces Visa Requirement for Trinidad & Tobago Nationals
Israel	Electronic Travel Authorization	90 days	
Italy	Visa not required	90 days	90 days within any 180 day period in the Schengen Area
Jamaica	Visa not required		Holders of Caricom Certificate of Skills can stay indefinitely.
Japan	Visa required		
Jordan	eVisa / Visa on arrival	30 days	Conditions apply.; Not available at all entry points.
Kazakhstan	eVisa		
Kenya	Visa not required	90 days	
Kiribati	Visa not required	90 days	90 days in any calendar year period
North Korea	Visa required		
South Korea	Electronic Travel Authorization	90 days	
Kuwait	Visa required		
Kyrgyzstan	eVisa		Electronic visa holders must arrive via Manas International Airport or Osh Airport or through land crossings with China (at Irkeshtam and Torugart), Kazakhstan (at Ak-jol, Ak-Tilek, Chaldybar, Chon-Kapka), Tajikistan (at Bor-Dobo, Kulundu, Kyzyl-Bel) and Uzbekistan (at Dostuk).
Laos	eVisa / Visa on arrival	30 days	18 (Note: Savannakhet Airport; Lanetoui - Mengkang (China); Meuangmom - Wan Pong (Myanmar); Banvang - Ban Khok Phai (Thailand); Namngeun - Huay Kon (Thailand); Paksan - Bueng Kan (Thailand); Paktaphan - Pak Saeng (Thailand); Pangmon - Ban Huak (Thailand); Phoudou (Thailand); Dak ta ock - Nam Giang (Vietnam); La Lai (Vietnam); Namkan (Vietnam); Namphao - Cau Treo (Vietnam); Namsoy - Na Meo (Vietnam); Naphao - Cha Lo (Vietnam); Pahang - Long Sap (Vietnam); Panghok - Tây Trang (Vietnam); Phoukeua - Bo Y (Vietnam)) of the 33 border crossings are only open to regular visa holders.; e-Visa may be used to enter Laos through the Luang Prabang, Pakse and Vientiane international airports, 3 Thai-Lao Friendship Bridges (Note: Vientiane (Friendship Bridge 1); Savannakhet (Friendship Bridge 2); Bokeo (Friendship Bridge 4)), in Boten (road and railroad), and in Vientiane (at Khamsavath railway station).; Visa on arrival is available at the Luang Prabang, Pakse and Vientiane international airports, 4 Thai-Lao Friendship Bridges (Note: Vientiane (Friendship Bridge 1); Savannakhet (Friendship Bridge 2); Khammouane (Friendship Bridge 3); Bokeo (Friendship Bridge 4)) and 7 border crossings. (Note: Nongnokkheane - Trapeang Kriel (Cambodia); Boten - Bo han (China); Golden Triangle/Samliemkham (Thailand); Khamsavath railway station (Thailand); Namheuang - Ban Na Kraseng (Thailand); Vang tao - Chongmek (Thailand); Dansavan - Lao Bảo (Vietnam))
Latvia	Visa not required	90 days	90 days within any 180 day period in the Schengen Area
Lebanon	Visa required		In addition to a visa, an approval should be obtained from the Immigration department of the General Directorate for General Security (La Surete Generale).
Lesotho	Visa not required	90 days	
Liberia	eVOA		eVisa required from March 2025
Libya	eVisa		Might be accessed online
Liechtenstein	Visa not required	90 days	90 days within any 180 day period in the Schengen Area
Lithuania	Visa not required	90 days	90 days within any 180 day period in the Schengen Area
Luxembourg	Visa not required	90 days	90 days within any 180 day period in the Schengen Area
Madagascar	eVisa / Visa on arrival	90 days	
Malawi	Visa not required	90 days	
Malaysia	Visa not required	30 days	
Maldives	Visa on arrival	30 days	
Mali	Visa required		
Malta	Visa not required	90 days	90 days within any 180 day period in the Schengen Area
Marshall Islands	Visa required		
Mauritania	eVisa		Available at Nouakchott–Oumtounsy International Airport.
Mauritius	Visa not required	180 days	180 days per calendar for tourism, 120 days per calendar year for business
Mexico	Visa not required	180 days	
Micronesia	Visa not required	30 days	
Moldova	Visa not required	90 days	90 days within any 180 day period
Monaco	Visa not required		
Mongolia	eVisa	30 days	
Montenegro	Visa not required	90 days	
Morocco	Visa required		
Mozambique	eVisa / Visa on arrival	30 days	Conditions apply
Myanmar	Visa required		
Namibia	eVisa	90 Days	
Nauru	Visa required		
Nepal	eVisa / Visa on arrival	90 days	
Netherlands	Visa not required	90 days	90 days within any 180 day period in the Schengen Area
New Zealand	Visa required		Holders of an Australian Permanent Resident Visa or Resident Return Visa may be granted a New Zealand Resident Visa on arrival permitting indefinite stay (pursuant to the Trans-Tasman Travel Arrangement), subject to meeting character requirements and obtaining an Electronic Travel Authority prior to departure.
Nicaragua	Visa required		
Niger	Visa required		
Nigeria	eVisa	90 days	
North Macedonia	Visa required		Holders of a valid Type "C" multiple entry visa or Permanent Residency for the Schengen Area may enter North Macedonia for up to 15 days visa free. A temporary residence permit (with expiration date) is not accepted.; Holders of a valid UK, Canada or USA visa may enter North Macedonia for up to 15 days visa free.; Holders of UN travel documents do not require a visa.
Norway	Visa not required	90 days	90 days within any 180 day period in the Schengen Area
Oman	Visa required		
Pakistan	Electronic Travel Authorization	90 days	Free of charge
Palau	Visa on arrival	30 days	
Panama	Visa not required	180 days	
Papua New Guinea	Easy Visitor Permit	60 days	
Paraguay	Visa not required	90 days	Visa-free agreement signed in June 2024.
Peru	Visa not required	90 days	
Philippines	Visa not required	30 days	
Poland	Visa not required	90 days	90 days within any 180 day period in the Schengen Area
Portugal	Visa not required	90 days	90 days within any 180 day period in the Schengen Area
Qatar	eVisa		
Romania	Visa not required	90 days	90 days within any 180 day period in the Schengen Area
Russia	eVisa	16 days	
Rwanda	Visa not required	30 days	
Saint Kitts and Nevis	Visa not required	6 months	Holders of Caricom Certificate of Skills can stay indefinitely.
Saint Lucia	Visa not required	6 months	Holders of Caricom Certificate of Skills can stay indefinitely.
Saint Vincent and the Grenadines	Visa not required	6 months	Holders of Caricom Certificate of Skills can stay indefinitely.
Samoa	Entry Permit on arrival	60 days	
San Marino	Visa not required		
São Tomé and Príncipe	eVisa		
Saudi Arabia	Visa required		
Senegal	Visa on arrival	90 days	
Serbia	Visa not required	90 days	90 days within any 180 day period
Seychelles	Electronic Border System	3 months	
Sierra Leone	Free visa on arrival	1 month	
Singapore	Visa not required	30 days	
Slovakia	Visa not required	90 days	90 days within any 180 day period in the Schengen Area
Slovenia	Visa not required	90 days	90 days within any 180 day period in the Schengen Area
Solomon Islands	Free visitor's permit on arrival	3 months	
Somalia	eVisa	30 days	All visitors must have an approved Electronic Visa (eTAS) before the start of their journey.
South Africa	Visa not required	90 days	Must have two blank passport pages available
South Sudan	eVisa		Obtainable online; Printed visa authorization must be presented at the time of travel
Spain	Visa not required	90 days	90 days within any 180 day period in the Schengen Area
Sri Lanka	Electronic Travel Authorization	30 days	
Sudan	Visa required		
Suriname	Visa not required	90 days	Holders of Caricom Certificate of Skills can stay indefinitely.
Sweden	Visa not required	90 days	90 days within any 180 day period in the Schengen Area
Switzerland	Visa not required	90 days	90 days within any 180 day period in the Schengen Area
Syria	eVisa	90 days	
Tajikistan	eVisa	60 days	
Tanzania	Visa not required	90 days	
Thailand	eVisa		Must have an international vaccination certificate.
Timor-Leste	Visa on arrival	30 days	Not available at all entry points.
Togo	eVisa	15 days	
Tonga	Visa required		
Tunisia	Visa required		
Turkey	Visa not required	90 days	
Turkmenistan	Visa required		
Tuvalu	Visa on arrival	1 month	
Uganda	Visa not required	90 days	
Ukraine	eVisa		
United Arab Emirates	eVisa		Passengers on all international airlines may enter the United Arab Emirates for 96 hours after obtaining a transit visa at the airport. The time difference between the two flights must be over 8 hours and the passenger must continue to a third destination. Passengers also must have a hotel booking.; All travellers in transit are exempt from entry fees for the first 48 hours; this brief entry may be extended for up to 96 hours for a fee of Dhs50.; Visitors normally require a sponsor but visas can also be arranged online through an airline if they are arriving on Air Arabia, Air Astana, Emirates, Etihad (and Air Baltic and Air Serbia), flydubai, Turkish Airlines and Indigo Airlines.; May apply online.; May apply also using 'Smart service'.
United Kingdom and Crown dependencies	Visa required		
United States	Visa required		
Uruguay	Visa not required	90 days	
Uzbekistan	Visa not required	30 days	
Vanuatu	Visa not required	30 days	
Vatican City	Visa not required		
Venezuela	Visa not required	90 days	
Vietnam	eVisa	90 days	Phú Quốc without a visa for up to 30 days.
Yemen	Visa required		
Zambia	Visa not required	90 days	
Zimbabwe	Visa not required	3 months	

== Dependent, disputed, or restricted territories ==
Unrecognized or partially recognized countries

Territory	Conditions of access	Notes
Abkhazia	Visa required	
Kosovo	Visa not required	90 days
Northern Cyprus	Visa not required	
Palestine	Visa not required	Arrival by sea to Gaza Strip not allowed.
Sahrawi Arab Democratic Republic		Undefined visa regime in the Western Sahara controlled territory.
Somaliland	Visa on arrival	30 days for 30 US dollars, payable on arrival.
South Ossetia	Visa not required	Multiple entry visa to Russia and three day prior notification are required to enter South Ossetia.
Taiwan	Visa required	
Transnistria	Visa not required	Registration required after 24h.

Dependent and autonomous territories

Territory	Conditions of access	Notes
China
Hong Kong	Visa not required	90 days
Macau	Visa on arrival	30 days
Denmark
Faroe Islands	Visa not required	90 days
Greenland	Visa not required	90 days
France
French Guiana	Visa not required	90 days
French Polynesia	Visa not required	90 days
(France) French West Indies	Visa not required	Visa free for overseas departments of Guadeloupe and Martinique; Visa required for overseas collectivities of Saint Barthélemy and Saint Martin
Mayotte	Visa not required	90 days
New Caledonia	Visa not required	90 days
Réunion	Visa not required	90 days
Saint Pierre and Miquelon	Visa not required	90 days
Wallis and Futuna	Visa not required	90 days
Netherlands
Aruba	Visa not required	90 days
Caribbean Netherlands	Visa not required	Includes Bonaire, Sint Eustatius and Saba.
Curaçao	Visa not required	90 days
Sint Maarten	Visa not required	90 days
New Zealand
Cook Islands	Visa not required	31 days
Niue	Visa not required	30 days
Tokelau	Visa required	
United Kingdom
Akrotiri and Dhekelia	Visa not required	Stays longer than 28 days per 12-month period require a permit.
Anguilla	Visa not required	6 months
Bermuda	Visa not required	6 months, [Visas required for transit countries (USA, Canada and UK) as there are no direct flights from T&T to Bermuda]
British Indian Ocean Territory	Special permit required	Special permit required.
British Virgin Islands	Visa not required	1 month
Cayman Islands	Visa not required	6 months
Falkland Islands	Visa required	
Gibraltar	Visa not required	6 months
Montserrat	Visa not required	6 months
Pitcairn Islands	Visa not required	14 days visa free and landing fee US$35 or tax of US$5 if not going ashore.
Ascension Island	eVisa	3 months within any year period
Saint Helena	Visitor's Pass required	Visitor's Pass granted on arrival valid for 4/10/21/60/90 days for 12/14/16/20/25 pound sterling.
Tristan da Cunha	Permission required	Permission to land required for 15/30 pounds sterling (yacht/ship passenger) for Tristan da Cunha Island or 20 pounds sterling for Gough Island, Inaccessible Island or Nightingale Islands.
South Georgia and the South Sandwich Islands	Permit required	Pre-arrival permit from the Commissioner required (72 hours/1 month for 110/160 pounds sterling).
Turks and Caicos Islands	Visa not required	90 days.
United States
American Samoa	Visa required	
Guam	Visa required	
Northern Mariana Islands	Visa required	
Puerto Rico	Visa required	
U.S. Virgin Islands	Visa required	
Antarctica and adjacent islands
Special permits required for Bouvet Island, British Antarctic Territory, French Southern and Antarctic Lands, Argentine Antarctica, (Australia) Australian Antarctic Territory, (Antártica Chilena Province) Chilean Antarctic Territory, (Australia) Heard Island and McDonald Islands, (Norway) Peter I Island, (Norway) Queen Maud Land, (New Zealand) Ross Dependency.

Other territories

Territory	Conditions of access	Notes
Belarus; Belovezhskaya Pushcha National Park	Visa not required	3 days; must first obtain an electronic pass
China; Hainan	Visa on arrival	15 days. Available at Haikou Meilan International Airport and Sanya Phoenix International Airport. Visa not required for 15 days for traveling as part of a tourist group (5 or more people)
China; Tibet Autonomous Region	TTP required	Tibet Travel Permit required (10 US Dollars).
(Autonomous Republic of Crimea) Crimea	Visa required	Visa issued by Russia is required.
Ecuador; Galápagos	Pre-registration required	Online pre-registration is required. Transit Control Card must also be obtained at the airport prior to departure.
Eritrea outside Asmara	Travel permit required	To travel in the rest of the country, a Travel Permit for Foreigners is required (20 Eritrean nakfa).
Greece; Mount Athos	Special permit required	Special permit required (4 days: 25 euro for Orthodox visitors, 35 euro for non-Orthodox visitors, 18 euro for students). There is a visitors' quota: maximum 100 Orthodox and 10 non-Orthodox per day and women are not allowed.
India PAP/RAP	PAP/RAP required	Protected Area Permit (PAP) required for whole states of Nagaland and Sikkim and parts of states Manipur, Arunachal Pradesh, Uttaranchal, Jammu and Kashmir, Rajasthan, Himachal Pradesh. Restricted Area Permit (RAP) required for all of Andaman and Nicobar Islands and parts of Sikkim. Some of these requirements are occasionally lifted for a year.
Iran; Kish Island	Visa not required	Visitors to Kish Island do not require a visa.
Iraqi Kurdistan	Visa on arrival	Visa on arrival for 15 days is available at Erbil and Sulaymaniyah airports.
Fiji; Lau Province	Special permission required	Special permission required.
France; Clipperton Island	Special permit required	Special permit required.
Kazakhstan	Special permission required	Special permission required for the town of Baikonur and surrounding areas in Kyzylorda Oblast, and the town of Gvardeyskiy near Almaty.
North Korea outside Pyongyang	Special permit required	People are not allowed to leave the capital city, tourists can only leave the capital with a governmental tourist guide (no independent moving)
Malaysia Sabah and Sarawak	Visa not required	These states have their own immigration authorities and passport is required to travel to them, however the same visa applies.
Maldives outside Malé	Permission required	With the exception of the capital Malé, tourists are generally prohibited from visiting non-resort islands without the express permission of the Government of Maldives.
Norway; Jan Mayen	Permit required	Permit issued by the local police required for staying for less than 24 hours and permit issued by the Norwegian police for staying for more than 24 hours.
Novorossiya	Restricted area	Crossing from Ukraine requires visit purpose to be explained to Ukrainian passport control on exit and those who entered from Russia are not allowed to proceed further into Ukraine.
Russia	Special authorization required	Several closed cities and regions in Russia require special authorization.
Sudan outside Khartoum	Travel permit required	All foreigners traveling more than 25 kilometers outside of Khartoum must obtain a travel permit.
Sudan; Darfur	Travel permit required	Separate travel permit is required.
Tajikistan; Gorno-Badakhshan Autonomous Province	OIVR permit required	OIVR permit required (15+5 Tajikistani Somoni) and another special permit (free of charge) is required for Lake Sarez.
(United Nations) UN Buffer Zone in Cyprus	Access Permit required	Access Permit is required for travelling inside the zone, except Civil Use Areas.
(United Nations) Korean Demilitarized Zone	Restricted zone.	
(United Nations) UNDOF Zone and Ghajar	Restricted zone.	
United States Minor Outlying Islands	Special permits required	Special permits required for Baker Island, Howland Island, Jarvis Island, Johnston Atoll, Kingman Reef, Midway Atoll, Palmyra Atoll and Wake Island.
Venezuela; Margarita Island	Visa not required	All visitors are fingerprinted.
Vietnam; Phú Quốc	Visa not required	30 days
Yemen outside Sana'a or Aden	Special permission required	Special permission needed for travel outside Sana'a or Aden.

== See also ==
- Visa policy of Trinidad and Tobago
- Trinidad and Tobago passport
