= Arizona's 1st congressional district =

U.S. House district for Arizona

Coordinates: 34°58′16″N 110°43′33″W

- Interactive map of district boundaries since January 3, 2023
- Representative: David Schweikert; R–Fountain Hills
- Area: 1,426 mi^{2} (3,690 km^{2})
- Distribution: 91.5% urban; 8.4% rural
- Population (2025): 809,175
- Median household income: $103,566
- Ethnicity: 69.9% White; 16.4% Hispanic; 4.5% Asian; 3.9% Two or more races; 3.2% Black; 1.6% Native American; 0.6% other
- Cook PVI: R+1

Arizona's 1st congressional district is a congressional district located in the U.S. state of Arizona, covering northeastern Maricopa County. Before 2023, geographically, it was the eleventh-largest congressional district in the country and included much of the state outside the Phoenix and Tucson metropolitan areas. From 2013 through 2022, it also included the Navajo Nation, the Hopi reservation, and the Gila River Indian Community, with 25% of the population being Native American. At that time, the district had more Native Americans than any other congressional district in the United States. In the 2022 elections, David Schweikert was elected in the redefined district.

The new 1st district (as of 2023) includes northeast Phoenix, Scottsdale, Paradise Valley, Cave Creek, Carefree, and Fountain Hills. It is majority-white and is the wealthiest congressional district in Arizona.

== History ==
When Arizona was first divided into congressional districts as a result of the 1950 census, the 1st district comprised all of Maricopa County, home to Phoenix, while the rest of the state was in the 2nd district. In a mid-decade redistricting resulting from Wesberry v. Sanders in 1967, the 1st was cut back to eastern Phoenix and most of what became the East Valley.

Over the years, the 1st's share of Phoenix was gradually reduced due to the area's explosive growth in the second half of the 20th century. However, it remained based in the East Valley until Arizona picked up two seats in the 2000 U.S. census. The old 1st essentially became the 6th district, while a new 1st district was created to serve most of the state outside of Phoenix and Tucson.

During its time in the East Valley, the 1st district was represented by some of Arizona’s most prominent lawmakers, including John Jacob Rhodes, the House Minority Leader during the Nixon administration, who was succeeded by John McCain, a future senator and presidential nominee. Jeff Flake, another future Senator, held the district during the final term as the East Valley district.

After the 2012 redistricting, the Hopi reservation was drawn into the 1st district; it had previously been included within the 2nd district. Also included were some northern suburbs of Tucson that had been in the 8th, as well as a tiny section of Phoenix itself near the Gila River Indian Community. Meanwhile, heavily Republican Prescott, the old 1st's largest city, and much of surrounding Yavapai County were drawn into the new, heavily Republican 4th district. The district was then considered to be significantly more competitive for Democrats, who held the seat without interruption for a decade.

In the 2022 redistricting, this district essentially became the 2nd district, while the 1st was redrawn to cover most of the territory in the 6th district. It covers Northeastern Maricopa County, east of I-17 and north of Az-202 along the Salt River. It includes the northeastern suburbs of Phoenix, Scottsdale, Paradise Valley, Cave Creek, Carefree, Fountain Hills, Rio Verde, and the Fort McDowell Yavapai Nation. That district, in turn, had been the 4th district from 1973 to 2003, and then the 3rd district from 2003 to 2013.

=== 2012–2021 areas covered ===
From 2012 to 2021, the district covered the entirety of the following counties:

- Apache County
- Coconino County
- Graham County
- Greenlee County
- Navajo County

The district covered the majority of:

- Pinal County

Small portions of the following counties were also covered:

- Gila County
- Maricopa County
- Mohave County
- Pima County
- Yavapai County

=== 2023–2033 areas covered ===
Maricopa County (11)
Carefree, Cave Creek, Fountain Hills, Mesa (part; also 4th and 5th), Paradise Valley, Phoenix (part; also 3rd, 4th, and 8th), Rio Verde, Scottsdale

== Recent election results from statewide races ==
Year	Office	Results
2003–2013 Boundaries
2004	President	Bush 53.8% - 45.5%
2008	President	McCain 54.5% - 44.1%
2010	Senate	McCain 58.3% - 35.0%
2010	Governor	Brewer 55.7% - 41.0%
2010	Secretary of State	Bennett 56.5% - 43.5%
2010	Attorney General	Horne 52.4% - 47.6%
2010	Treasurer	Ducey 51.1% - 41.8%
2013–2023 Boundaries
2008	President	McCain 51.0% - 47.8%
2012	President	Romney 50.4% - 47.9%
2016	President	Trump 47.7% - 46.6%
2016	Senate	McCain 48.4% - 45.3%
2018	Senate	Sinema 50.6% - 46.4%
2018	Governor	Ducey 54.3% - 43.1%
2018	Attorney General	Contreras 49.9% - 49.9%
2020	President	Biden 50.1% - 48.4%
2020	Senate (Spec.)	Kelly 52.1% - 47.9%
2023–2033 Boundaries
2016	President	Trump 48.8% - 44.6%
2016	Senate	McCain 57.8% - 37.4%
2018	Senate	Sinema 50.0% - 48.3%
2018	Governor	Ducey 57.7% - 40.7%
2020	President	Biden 50.1% - 48.6%
2020	Senate (Spec.)	Kelly 50.7% - 49.3%
2022	Senate	Kelly 52.5% - 45.8%
2022	Governor	Hobbs 51.5% - 48.1%
2022	Secretary of State	Fontes 54.0% - 45.9%
2022	Attorney General	Mayes 51.4% - 48.5%
2022	Treasurer	Yee 56.3% - 43.7%
2024	President	Trump 51.1% - 48.0%
2024	Senate	Gallego 51.6% - 46.6%

== List of members representing the district ==
Arizona gained a second congressional seat after the 1940 census. It used a general ticket to elect its representatives until the 1948 elections, when candidates ran from each of the districts.

Member	Party	Term	Cong ress	Electoral history	Geographical area
District created January 3, 1949
John R. Murdock (Tempe)	Democratic	January 3, 1949 – January 3, 1953	81st 82nd	Redistricted from the at-large district and re-elected in 1948. Re-elected in 1950. Lost re-election.	1949–1967: Maricopa County: Metro Phoenix
John J. Rhodes Jr. (Mesa)	Republican	January 3, 1953 – January 3, 1983	83rd 84th 85th 86th 87th 88th 89th 90th 91st 92nd 93rd 94th 95th 96th 97th	Elected in 1952. Re-elected in 1954. Re-elected in 1956. Re-elected in 1958. Re-elected in 1960. Re-elected in 1962. Re-elected in 1964. Re-elected in 1966; Re-elected in 1968; Re-elected in 1970; Re-elected in 1972; Re-elected in 1974; Re-elected in 1976; Re-elected in 1978; Re-elected in 1980; Retired.	1949–1967: Maricopa County: Metro Phoenix
John J. Rhodes Jr. (Mesa)	Republican	January 3, 1953 – January 3, 1983	83rd 84th 85th 86th 87th 88th 89th 90th 91st 92nd 93rd 94th 95th 96th 97th	Elected in 1952. Re-elected in 1954. Re-elected in 1956. Re-elected in 1958. Re-elected in 1960. Re-elected in 1962. Re-elected in 1964. Re-elected in 1966; Re-elected in 1968; Re-elected in 1970; Re-elected in 1972; Re-elected in 1974; Re-elected in 1976; Re-elected in 1978; Re-elected in 1980; Retired.	1967–1983: Part of Maricopa County: Metro Phoenix
John McCain (Tempe)	Republican	January 3, 1983 – January 3, 1987	98th 99th	Elected in 1982. Re-elected in 1984. Retired to run for U.S. senator.	1983–2003: Part of Maricopa County: Parts of Metro Phoenix (East Valley)
John J. Rhodes III (Mesa)	Republican	January 3, 1987 – January 3, 1993	100th 101st 102nd	Elected in 1986. Re-elected in 1988. Re-elected in 1990. Lost re-election.	1983–2003: Part of Maricopa County: Parts of Metro Phoenix (East Valley)
Sam Coppersmith (Phoenix)	Democratic	January 3, 1993 – January 3, 1995	103rd	Elected in 1992. Retired to run for U.S. senator.	1983–2003: Part of Maricopa County: Parts of Metro Phoenix (East Valley)
Matt Salmon (Mesa)	Republican	January 3, 1995 – January 3, 2001	104th 105th 106th	Elected in 1994. Re-elected in 1996. Re-elected in 1998. Retired to run for Governor of Arizona.	1983–2003: Part of Maricopa County: Parts of Metro Phoenix (East Valley)
Jeff Flake (Mesa)	Republican	January 3, 2001 – January 3, 2003	107th	Elected in 2000. Redistricted to the 6th district.	1983–2003: Part of Maricopa County: Parts of Metro Phoenix (East Valley)
Rick Renzi (Flagstaff)	Republican	January 3, 2003 – January 3, 2009	108th 109th 110th	Elected in 2002. Re-elected in 2004. Re-elected in 2006. Retired.	2003–2013: North and East Arizona: Apache County, Gila County, Graham County, Greenlee County, Yavapai County, and parts of Coconino County, Navajo County, and Pinal County
Ann Kirkpatrick (Flagstaff)	Democratic	January 3, 2009 – January 3, 2011	111th	Elected in 2008. Lost re-election.	2003–2013: North and East Arizona: Apache County, Gila County, Graham County, Greenlee County, Yavapai County, and parts of Coconino County, Navajo County, and Pinal County
Paul Gosar (Flagstaff)	Republican	January 3, 2011 – January 3, 2013	112th	Elected in 2010. Redistricted to the 4th district.	2003–2013: North and East Arizona: Apache County, Gila County, Graham County, Greenlee County, Yavapai County, and parts of Coconino County, Navajo County, and Pinal County
Ann Kirkpatrick (Flagstaff)	Democratic	January 3, 2013 – January 3, 2017	113th 114th	Elected again in 2012. Re-elected in 2014. Retired to run for U.S. senator.	2013–2023: Apache County, and parts of Coconino County, Gila County, Graham County, Greenlee County, Maricopa County part Navajo County, Pima County, Pinal County
Tom O'Halleran (Sedona)	Democratic	January 3, 2017 – January 3, 2023	115th 116th 117th	Elected in 2016. Re-elected in 2018. Re-elected in 2020. Redistricted to the 2nd district and lost re-election.	2013–2023: Apache County, and parts of Coconino County, Gila County, Graham County, Greenlee County, Maricopa County part Navajo County, Pima County, Pinal County
David Schweikert (Fountain Hills)	Republican	January 3, 2023 – present	118th 119th	Redistricted from the 6th district and re-elected in 2022. Re-elected in 2024. Retiring to run for governor.	2023–present: Northeastern suburbs of Phoenix, including Scottsdale, Paradise Valley, Cave Creek, and Fountain Hills
Amish Shah (Phoenix)	Democratic	Assuming office on January 3, 2027		Elected in 2026.	2023–present: Northeastern suburbs of Phoenix, including Scottsdale, Paradise Valley, Cave Creek, and Fountain Hills

== Recent election results ==
View source data.
Graph of election results in Arizona's 1st congressional district and its predecessors (Since 2002)

=== 2002–2012 ===
==== 2002 ====
Arizona's 1st Congressional District House Election, 2002
Party	Candidate	Votes	%
Republican	Rick Renzi	85,967	49.2
Democratic	George Cordova	79,730	45.6
Libertarian	Edwin Porr	8,990	5.1
Majority		6,237	3.6
Total votes		174,687	100.0
Republican win (new seat)			

==== 2004 ====
Arizona's 1st Congressional District House Election, 2004
Party	Candidate	Votes	%	±%
Republican	Rick Renzi (Incumbent)	148,315	58.5	+9.3
Democratic	Paul Babbitt	91,776	36.2	–9.4
Libertarian	John Crockett	13,260	5.2	+0.1
Majority		56,539	22.3	+18.7
Total votes		253,351	100.0	
Republican hold		Swing	+9.4	

==== 2006 ====
Arizona's 1st Congressional District House Election, 2006
Party	Candidate	Votes	%	±%
Republican	Rick Renzi (Incumbent)	105,646	53.2	–5.3
Democratic	Ellen Simon	88,691	44.7	+8.4
Libertarian	David Schlosser	4,205	2.1	–3.1
Majority		16,955	8.5	–13.8
Total votes		198,542	100.0	
Republican hold		Swing	–6.9	

==== 2008 ====
Arizona's 1st Congressional District House Election, 2008
Party	Candidate	Votes	%	±%
Democratic	Ann Kirkpatrick	155,791	57.5	+12.8
Republican	Sydney Hay	109,924	40.5	–12.7
Independent	Brent Maupin	4,124	1.5	N/a
Libertarian	Thane Eichenauer	1,316	0.5	–1.6
Majority		45,867	16.9	N/a
Total votes		271,155	100.0	
Democratic gain from Republican		Swing	+12.7	

==== 2010 ====
Arizona's 1st Congressional District House Election, 2010
Party	Candidate	Votes	%	±%
Republican	Paul Gosar	112,816	49.7	+9.2
Democratic	Ann Kirkpatrick (Incumbent)	99,233	43.7	–13.7
Libertarian	Nicole Patti	14,869	6.6	+6.1
Majority		13,583	6.0	N/a
Total votes		226,918	100.0	
Republican gain from Democratic		Swing	+11.5	

=== 2012–2022 ===
==== 2012 ====
Arizona's 1st Congressional District House Election, 2012
Party	Candidate	Votes	%
Democratic	Ann Kirkpatrick	122,774	48.8
Republican	Jonathan Paton	113,594	45.1
Libertarian	Kim Allen	15,227	6.1
Majority		9,180	3.6
Total votes		251,595	100.0
Democratic win (new boundaries)			

==== 2014 ====
Arizona's 1st Congressional District House Election, 2014
Party	Candidate	Votes	%	±%
Democratic	Ann Kirkpatrick (Incumbent)	97,391	52.6	+3.8
Republican	Andy Tobin	87,723	47.4	+2.2
Majority		9,568	5.2	+1.6
Total votes		185,114	100.0	
Democratic hold		Swing	+0.8	

==== 2016 ====
Arizona's 1st Congressional District House Election, 2016
Party	Candidate	Votes	%	±%
Democratic	Tom O'Halleran	142,219	50.6	–1.9
Republican	Paul Babeu	121,745	43.4	–4.0
Green	Ray Parrish	16,746	6.0	N/a
Majority		20,474	7.3	+2.1
Total votes		280,710	100.0	
Democratic hold		Swing	+1.0	

==== 2018 ====
Arizona's 1st Congressional District House Election, 2018
Party	Candidate	Votes	%	±%
Democratic	Tom O'Halleran (Incumbent)	143,240	53.8	+3.2
Republican	Wendy Rogers	122,784	46.2	+2.8
Majority		20,456	7.7	+0.4
Total votes		266,024	100.0	
Democratic hold		Swing	+0.2	

==== 2020 ====
Arizona's 1st Congressional District House Election, 2020
Party	Candidate	Votes	%	±%
Democratic	Tom O'Halleran (Incumbent)	188,469	51.6	–2.2
Republican	Tiffany Shedd	176,709	48.4	+2.2
Majority		11,760	3.2	–4.5
Total votes		365,178	100.0	
Democratic hold		Swing	–2.2	

=== 2022–present ===
==== 2022 ====
Arizona's 1st Congressional District House Election, 2022
Party	Candidate	Votes	%
Republican	David Schweikert (Incumbent)	182,336	50.4
Democratic	Jevin Hodge	179,141	49.6
Majority		3,195	0.9
Total votes		361,477	100.0
Republican win (new boundaries)			

==== 2024 ====
Arizona's 1st Congressional District House Election, 2024
Party	Candidate	Votes	%	±%
Republican	David Schweikert (Incumbent)	225,538	51.9	+1.5
Democratic	Amish Shah	208,966	48.1	–1.5
Majority		16,572	3.8	+2.9
Total votes		434,504	100.0	
Republican hold		Swing	+1.5	

== See also ==
- Arizona's congressional districts
- List of United States congressional districts
