= Trinidad and Tobago passport =

Passport issued to Trinidadian and Tobagonian citizens

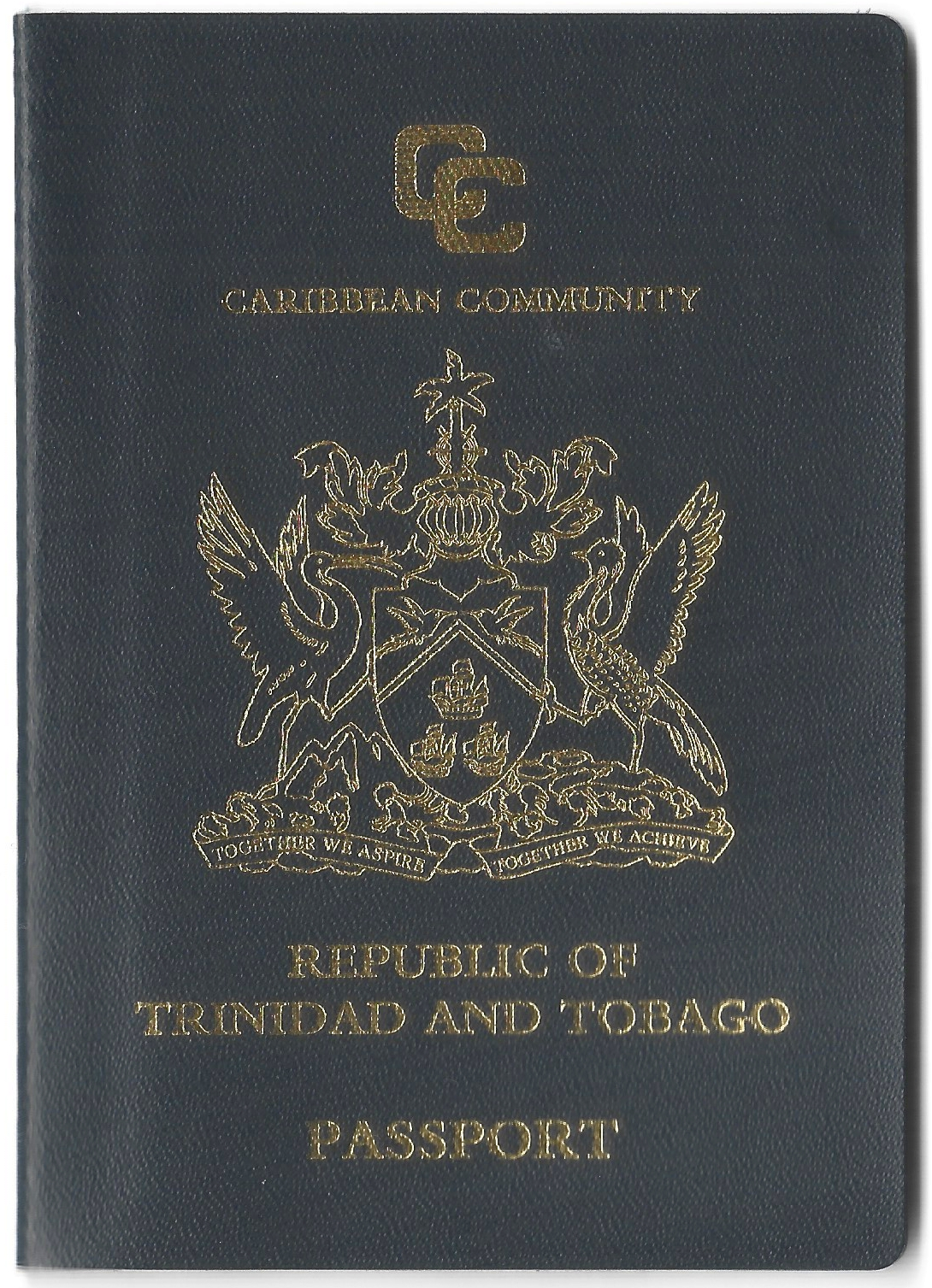
- Front cover of a Trinidad and Tobago passport
- Type: Passport
- Issued by: Trinidad and Tobago
- First issued: January 2007 (Machine-readable passport)
- Purpose: Identification
- Eligibility: Trinidadian and Tobagonian law citizenship
- Expiration: 10 years (adults); 5 years (children under 16)
- Cost: $500 TT for 32 page ordinary passport; $700 TT for 48 page business (ordinary) passport; $500 TT - $2000 TT for Lost/Stolen/Mutilated passport [priced at interview]; $600 TT (extra) for expedited passport; No fee for children under 2 years (first issue only); No fee for persons 60 years and over

Trinidad and Tobago passports are issued to citizens of Trinidad and Tobago for international travel; allowing the passport bearer to travel to foreign countries in accordance to stipulated visa requirements. All Trinidad and Tobago passports are issued through the Ministry of National Security, Immigration Division and are valid for a period of ten years for adults, and five years for children under 16. Passports can take at least 4 weeks for processing and babies are required to have their own passport.

The passport is a CARICOM passport, as Trinidad and Tobago is a member of the Caribbean Community.

== History ==
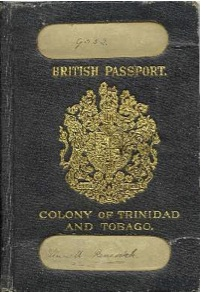
British Trinidad and Tobago passport

Prior to independence in 1962, Trinidad and Tobago was a crown colony, and British passports were used.

In 2007, a new machine-readable passport was launched by the government of Trinidad and Tobago to replace the existing passport. The new passport features the Caribbean Community logo along with many changes to the images adorned on it.

Presently, biometric or e-passports are not available but in late 2024, the Immigration division at the Ministry of National Security has been authorized to begin the transition.

A new fee structure was implemented effective January 1, 2026, doubling the previous costs.

== Application ==
A citizen of Trinidad and Tobago can apply for a passport by either:

- Birth in Trinidad and Tobago, and you did not relinquish your citizenship prior to July 29, 1988.
- Registration or naturalisation (through approval of the Minister of National Security).
- Descent (you were born outside Trinidad and Tobago, to at least one parent who was a citizen of Trinidad and Tobago (by birth) at the time of your birth).
- Adoption (you were adopted by a citizen of Trinidad and Tobago, in Trinidad and Tobago).

== Contents of Trinidad and Tobago passport ==
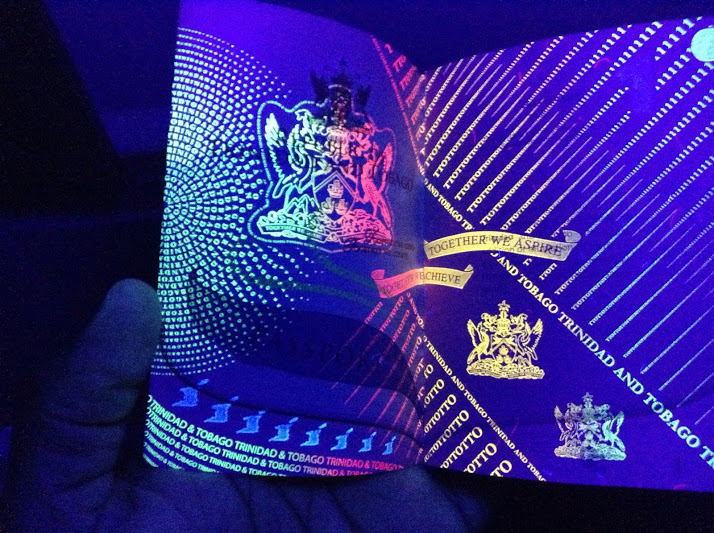
Security features of current passport

=== Front page ===
The front page of the Trinidad and Tobago passport contains the following information:

REPUBLIC OF TRINIDAD AND TOBAGO

PASSPORT

Model number (e.g. 2015)

Passport number

The following printed material:

This passport is the property of the Government of the Republic of Trinidad and Tobago. Alteration, addition or mutilation of entries is prohibited by law. Any unofficial change will render the passport invalid.

=== Last page ===
On the last page of the Trinidad and Tobago passport, the following statement is printed:

REPUBLIC OF TRINIDAD AND TOBAGO

The Minister of Foreign Affairs of the Republic of Trinidad and Tobago hereby requests all those whom it may concern to permit the citizen of the Republic of Trinidad and Tobago named herein to pass freely without let or hindrance and to afford the said citizen such lawful assistance and protection as may be necessary.

== Visa requirements ==
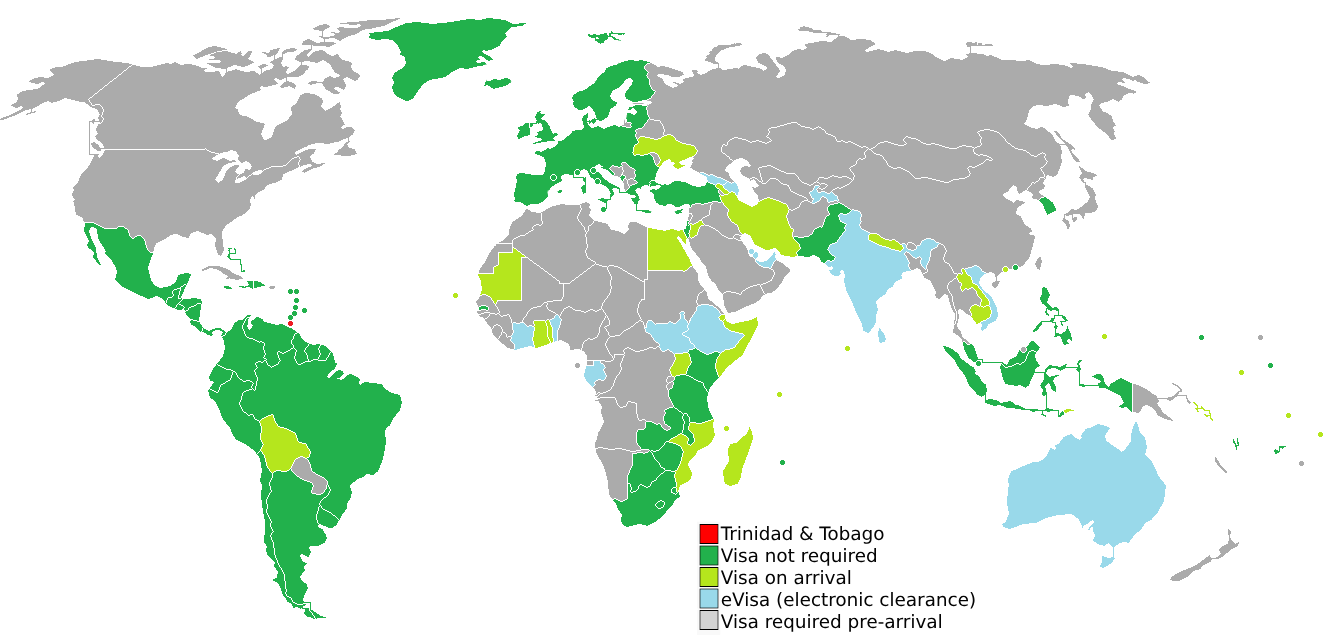
Visa requirements for Trinidad and Tobago citizens

Visa requirements for Trinidad and Tobago citizens are administrative entry restrictions by the authorities of other states placed on citizens of the Trinidad and Tobago. Effective 28 May 2015, Trinidad and Tobago citizens gained visa-free access to Schengen Area.

According to the March 2019 Visa Restrictions Index, the Trinidad and Tobago passport was ranked 28th (globally) in travel freedom and visa-free access. giving visa-free or visa on arrival access to 151 countries and territories. The Trinidad and Tobago passport also ranks 4th among CARICOM passport holders in these respects.

== Oath of Citizenship ==
Persons who obtained Trinidad and Tobago citizenship through naturalization and are eligible in obtaining a Trinidad and Tobago passport must take the Oath of Allegiance.

The Oath of Citizenship or officially Oath of Allegiance, is a statement recited by individuals wishing to become citizens of the Republic of Trinidad and Tobago. Individuals who wish to become a citizen of Trinidad and Tobago do so through the Ministry of National Security's Citizenship and Immigration Section. The Oath of Allegiance is a mandatory step to becoming a citizen of Trinidad and Tobago.

The Oath is preceded by an interview with a Chief Immigration Officer who determines whether an individual qualifies for Trinidad and Tobago citizenship. Following the Oath, an individual receives his or her Certificate of Citizenship confirming Trinidad and Tobago citizenship.

The Oath of Allegiance is different from that of the National Pledge, which is recited by citizens of Trinidad and Tobago as an expression of loyalty to the Republic.

The Oath of Allegiance is a legally binding contract intended to complete the process of obtaining Trinidad and Tobago citizenship. It also outlines the responsibilities of being a Trinidad and Tobago citizen as expressed by the laws of the nation. Its current form is as follows:

"I, state your full name, do swear that I will be faithful and bear true allegiance to Trinidad and Tobago and that I will faithfully observe the laws of Trinidad and Tobago and fulfil my duties as a citizen of Trinidad and Tobago. So help me God."

== See also ==
- CARICOM passport
- Visa requirements for Trinidad and Tobago citizens
