= 1979 State of the Union Address =

Speech by US President Jimmy Carter

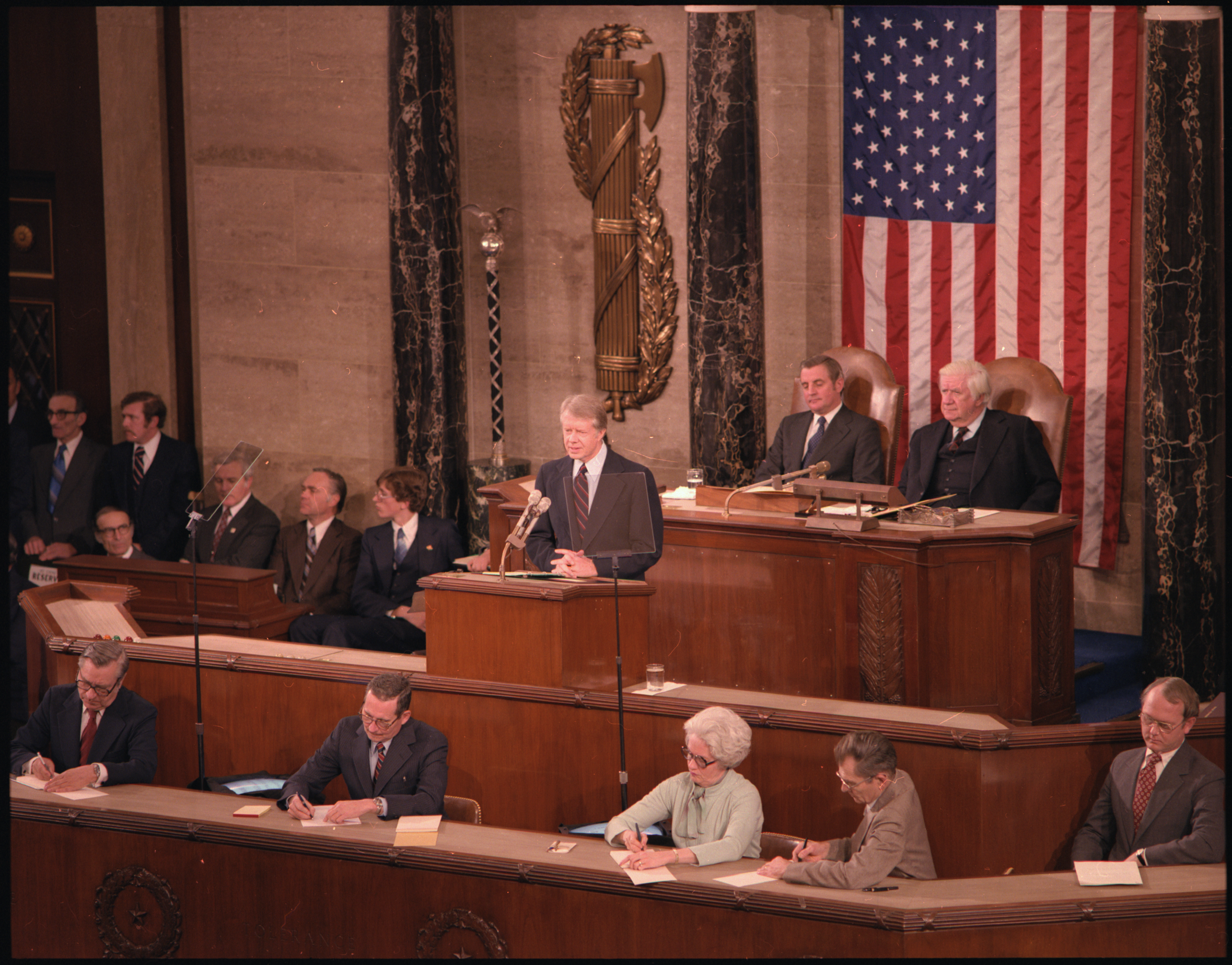
- President Carter delivering the 1979 State of the Union address
- Date: January 23, 1979
- Time: 9:00 p.m. EST
- Duration: 32 minutes
- Venue: House Chamber, United States Capitol
- Location: Washington, D.C.; 38°53′23″N 77°00′32″W
- Type: State of the Union Address
- Participants: Jimmy Carter; Walter Mondale; Tip O'Neill
- Previous: 1978 State of the Union Address
- Next: 1980 State of the Union Address

The 1979 State of the Union address was given by President Jimmy Carter to a joint session of the 96th United States Congress on January 23, 1979.

The speech lasted 32 minutes and 32 seconds. and contained 3257 words.

The Republican Party response was delivered by Senator Howard Baker Jr. (TN) and Representative John Rhodes (AZ).

In foreign policy, the President hailed the passage of the Panama Canal treaties, continuing multilateral trade negotiations, and curbing the nuclear proliferation.

In domestic policy, the President emphasized controlling healthcare costs and inflation.

| Preceded by 1978 State of the Union Address | State of the Union addresses 1979 | Succeeded by 1980 State of the Union Address |
