= List of diplomatic missions in Trinidad and Tobago =

This is a list of diplomatic missions in Trinidad and Tobago. There are currently 28 embassies/high commissions posted in Port of Spain.

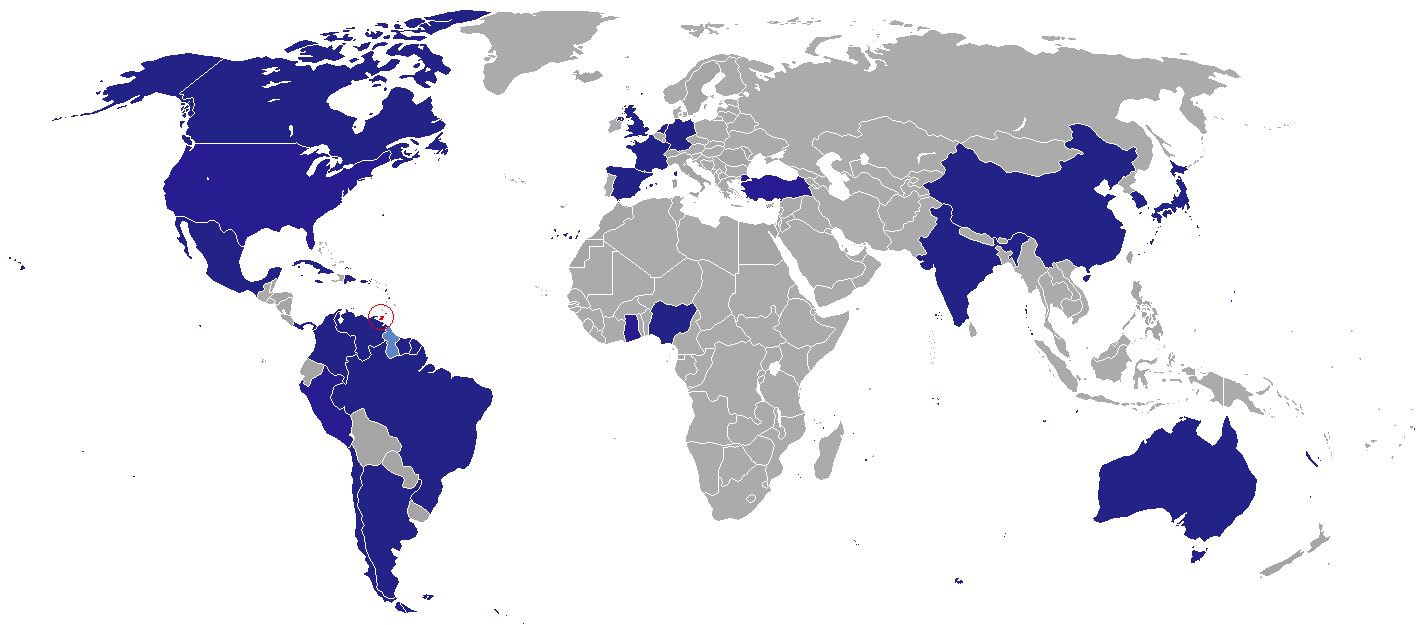
Map of diplomatic missions in Trinidad and Tobago

== Diplomatic missions in Port of Spain ==
=== Embassies & High Commissions ===
1. Argentina
2. Australia
3. Brazil
4. Canada
5. Chile
6. China
7. Colombia
8. Cuba
9. Dominican Republic
10. France
11. Germany
12. Ghana
13. Holy See
14. India
15. Jamaica
16. Japan
17. Mexico
18. Netherlands
19. Nigeria
20. Panama
21. Peru
22. South Korea
23. Spain
24. Turkey
25. United Kingdom
26. United States
27. Venezuela

=== Other delegations or missions ===
1. European Union (Delegation)
2. United Nations (Resident Coordinator's Office)

== Gallery ==
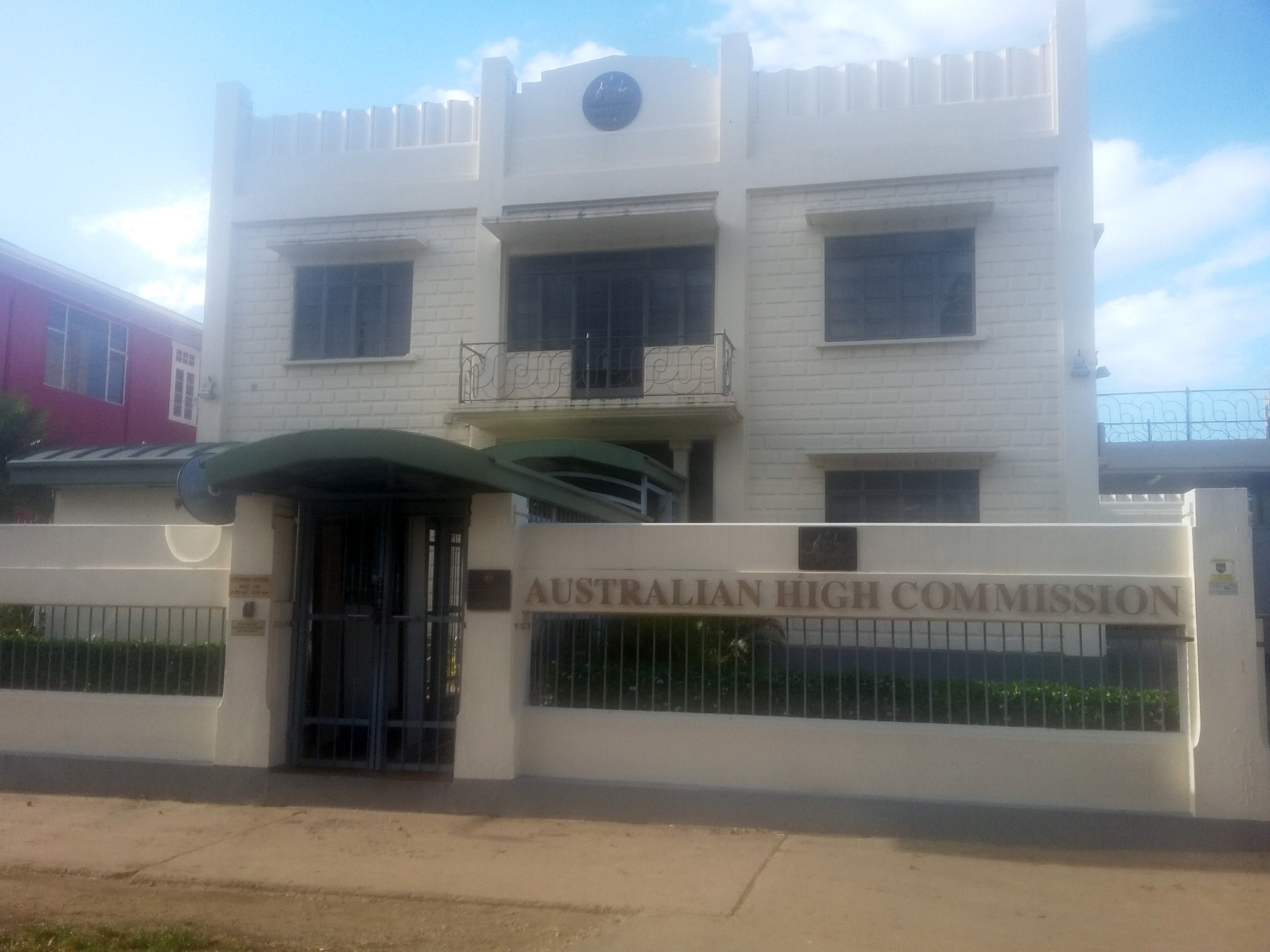
High Commission of Australia

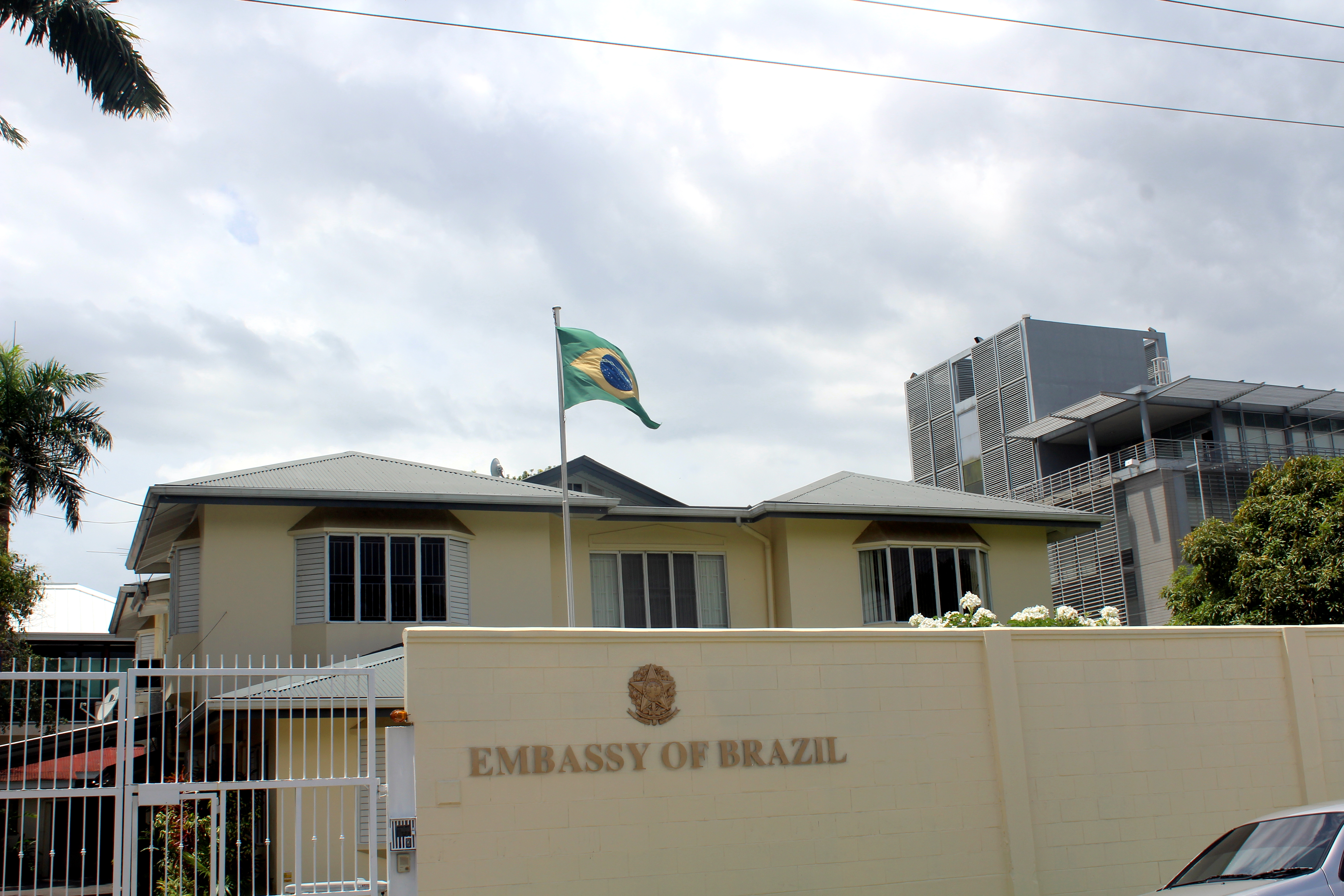
Embassy of Brazil

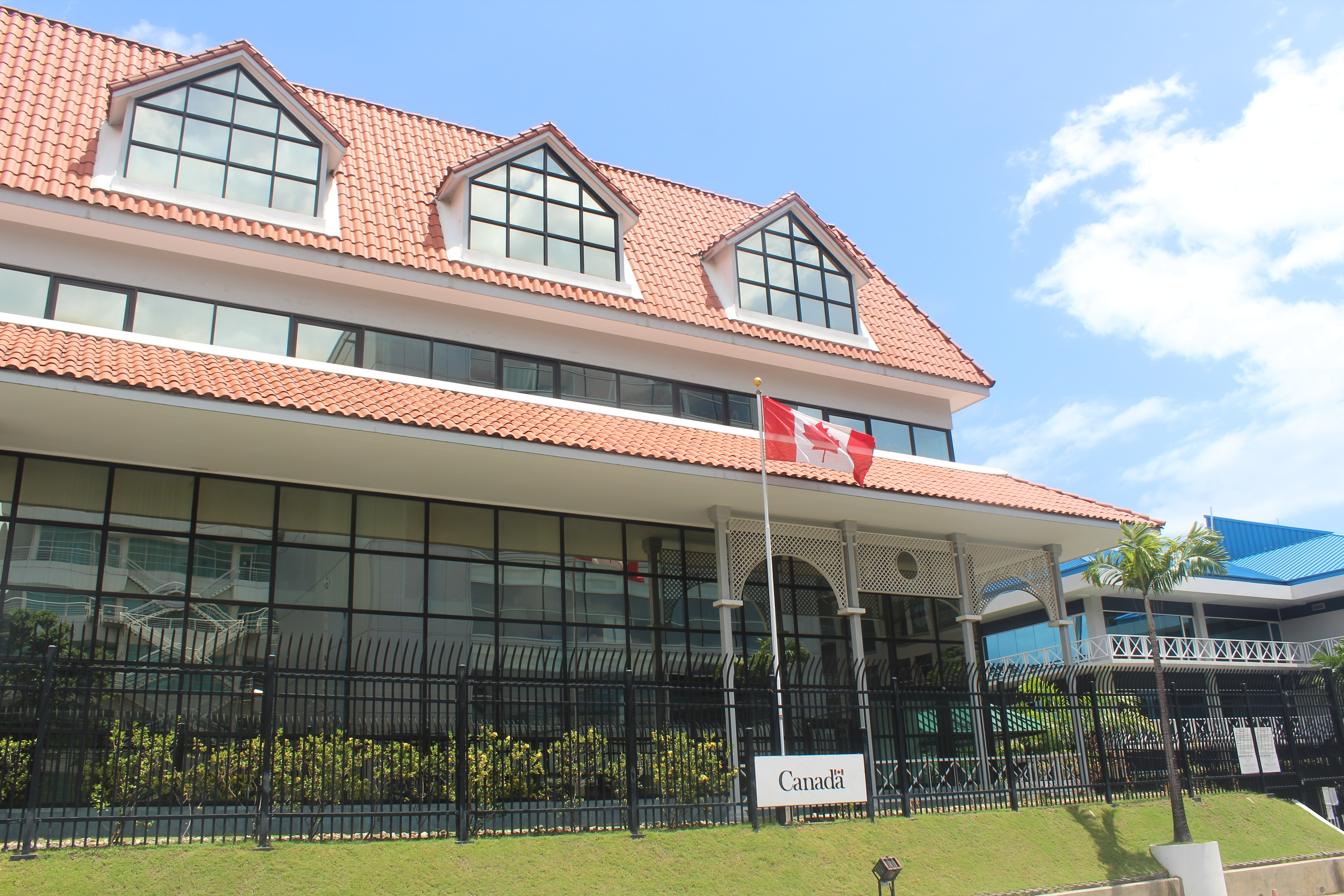
High Commission of Canada

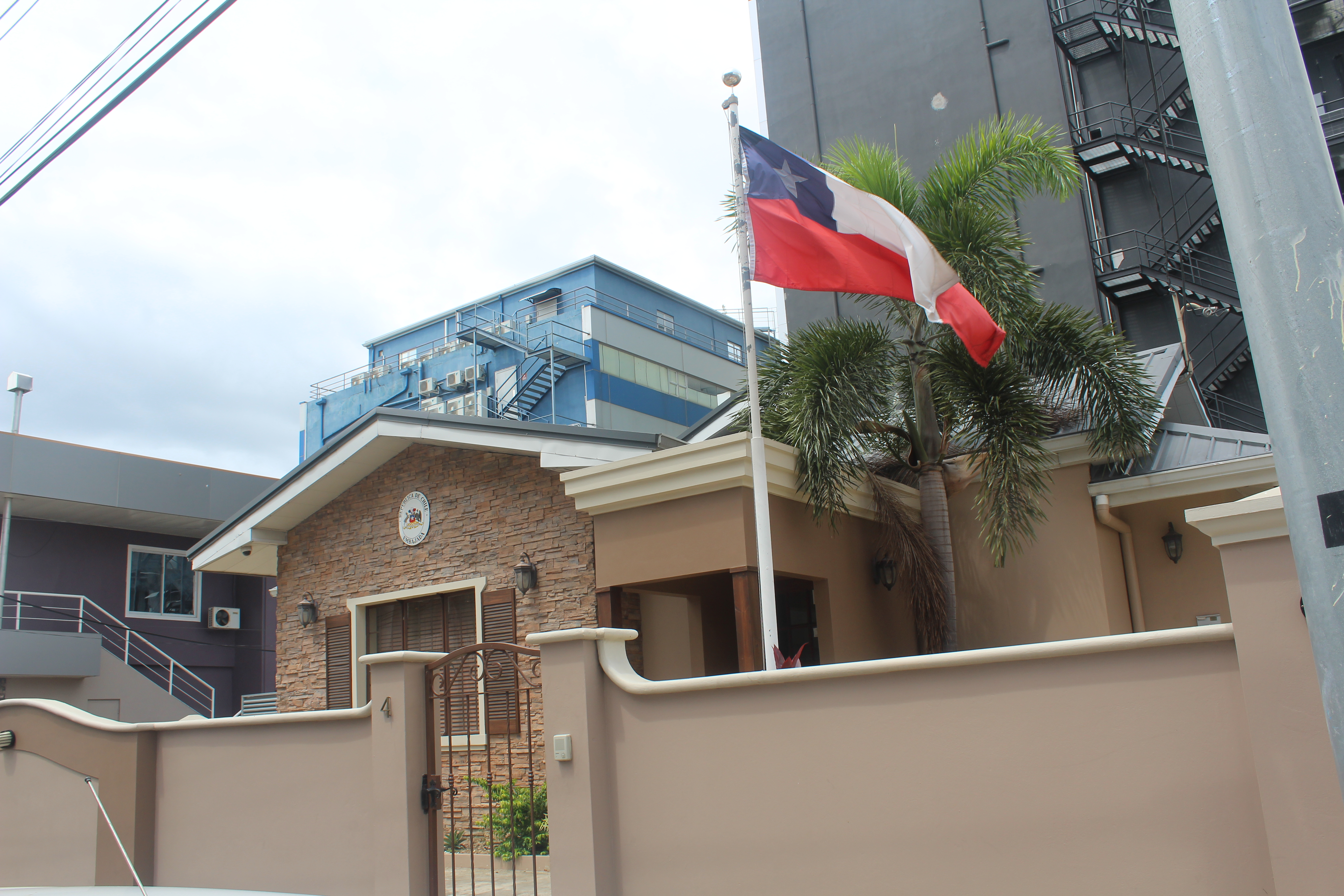
Embassy of Chile

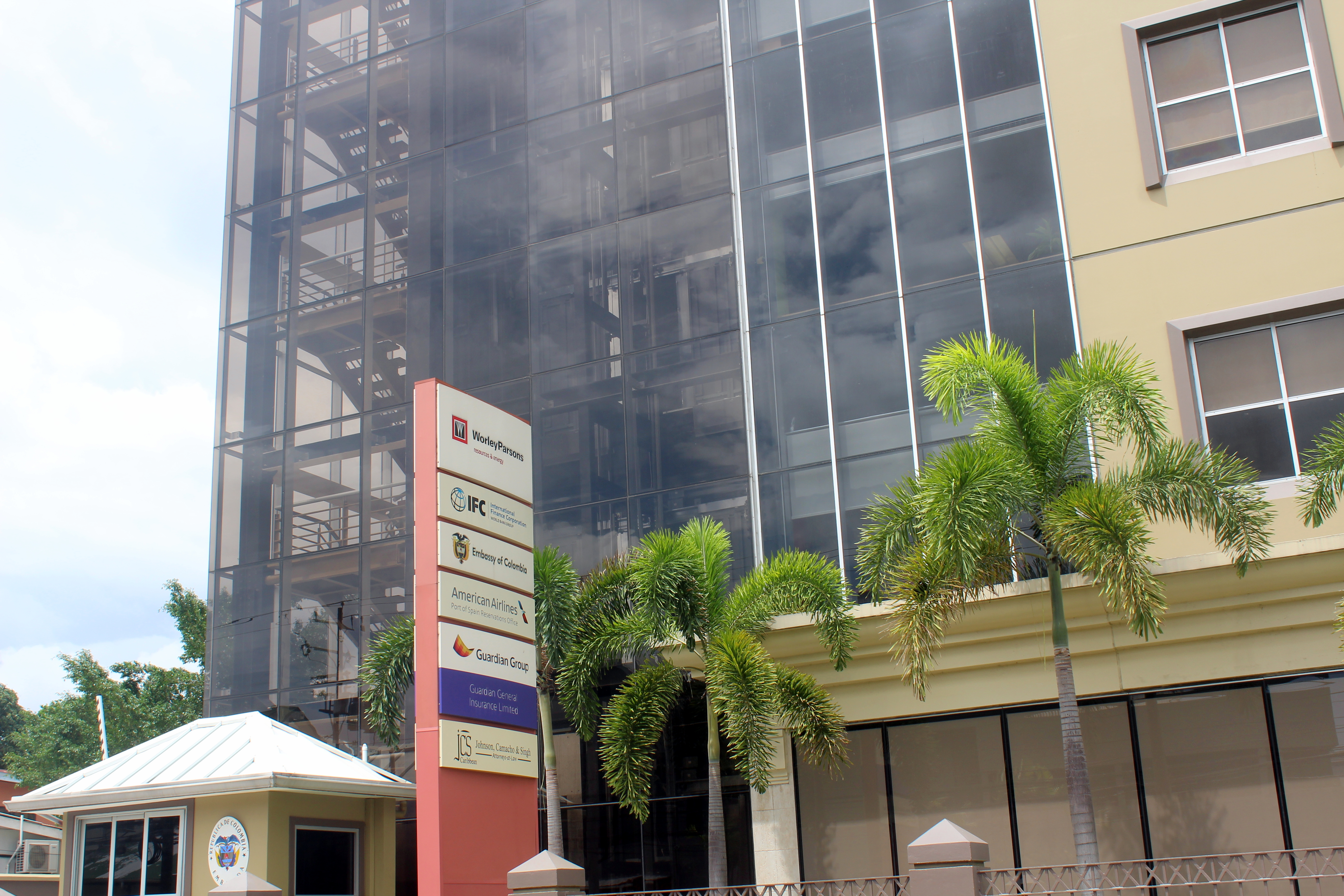
Embassy of Colombia

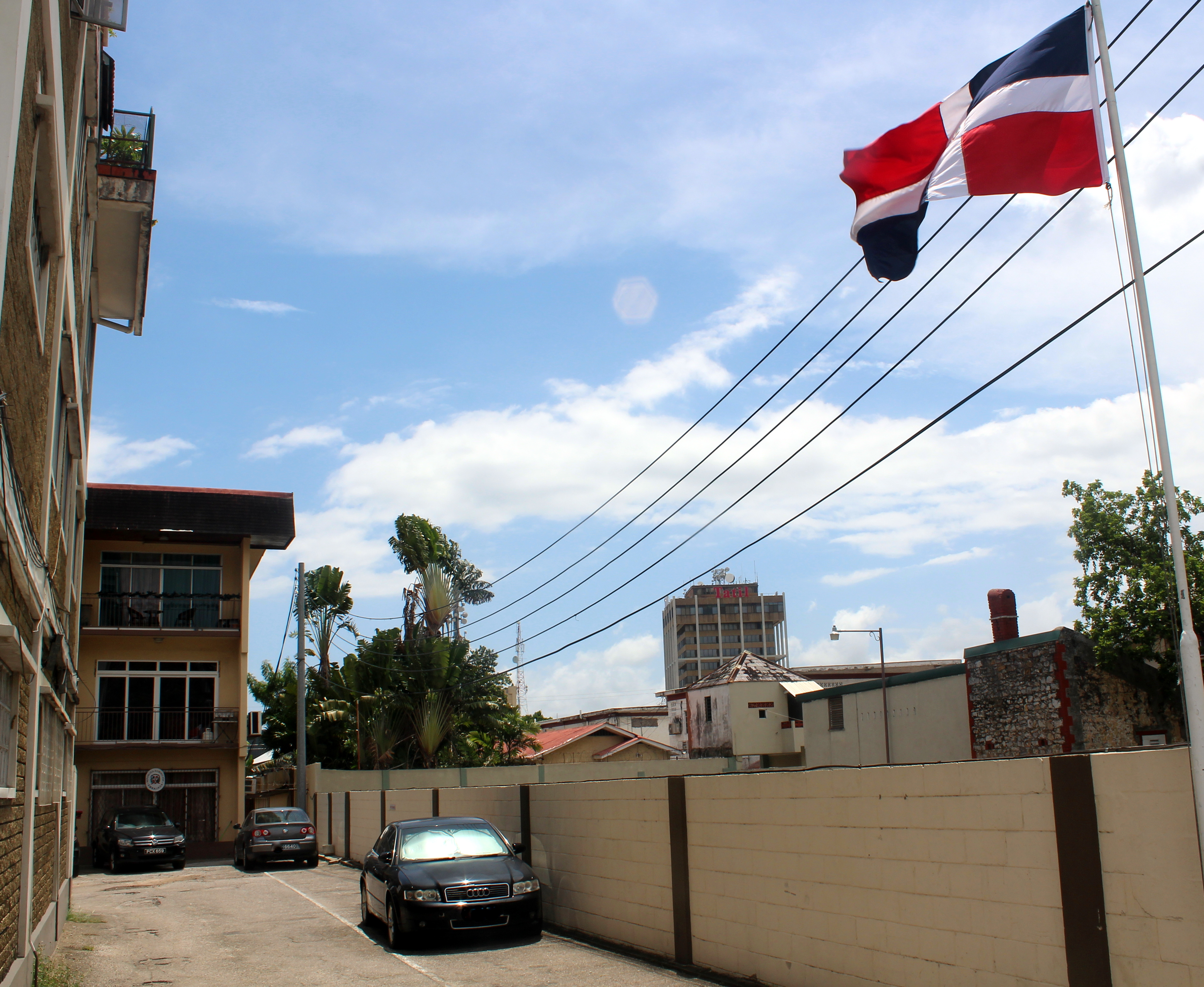
Embassy of the Dominican Republic

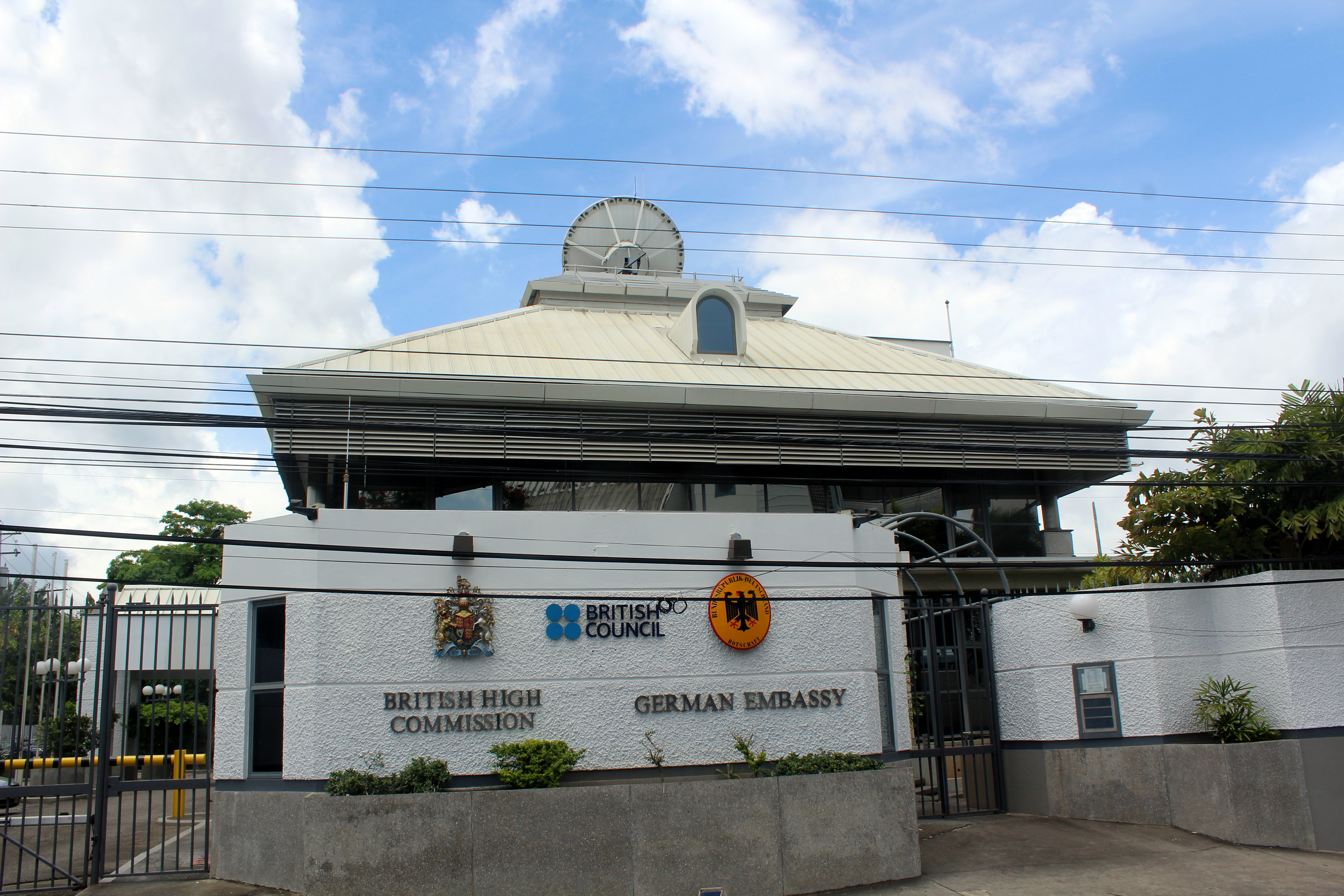
Building hosting the Embassy of Germany and the High Commission of the United Kingdom

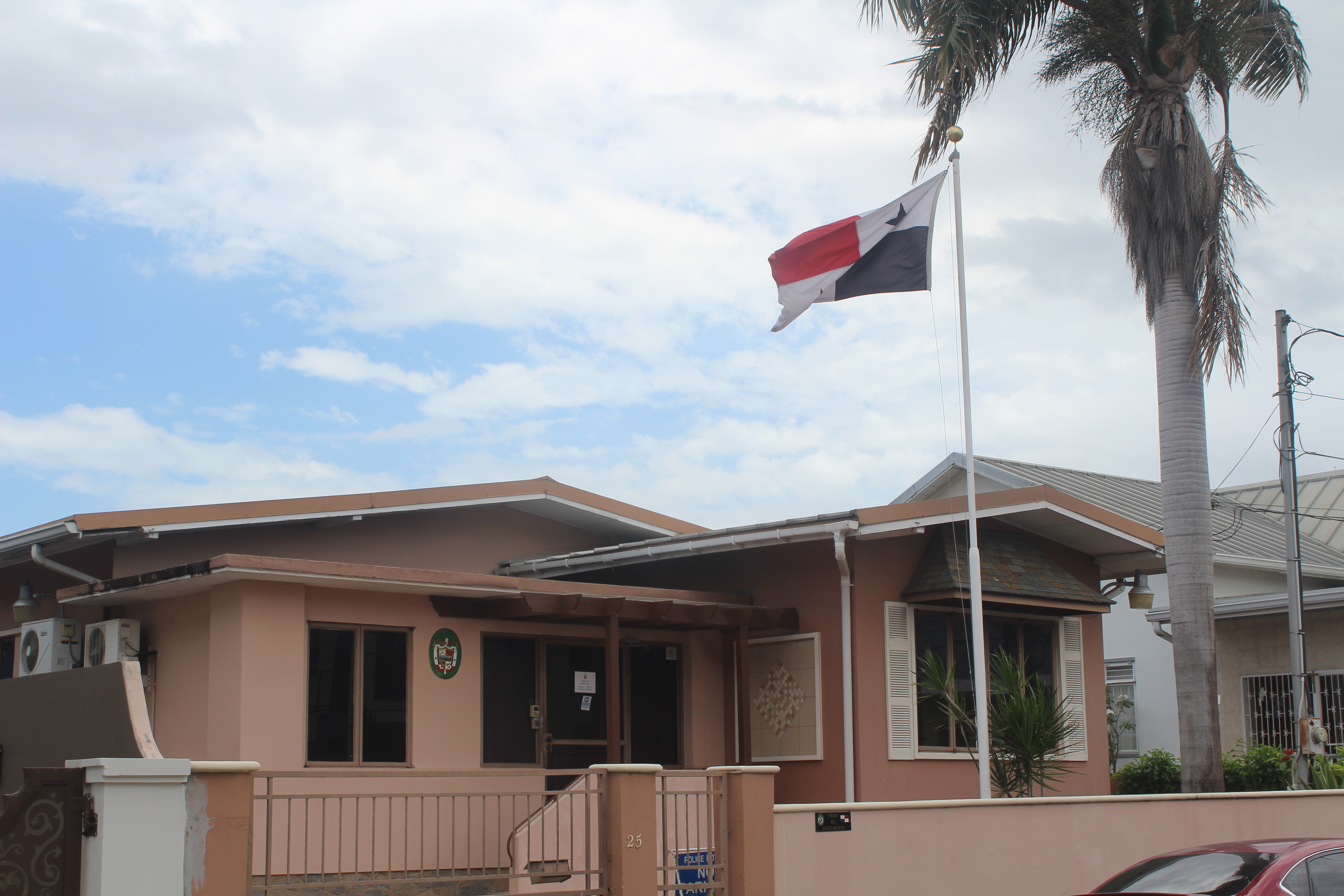
Embassy of Panama

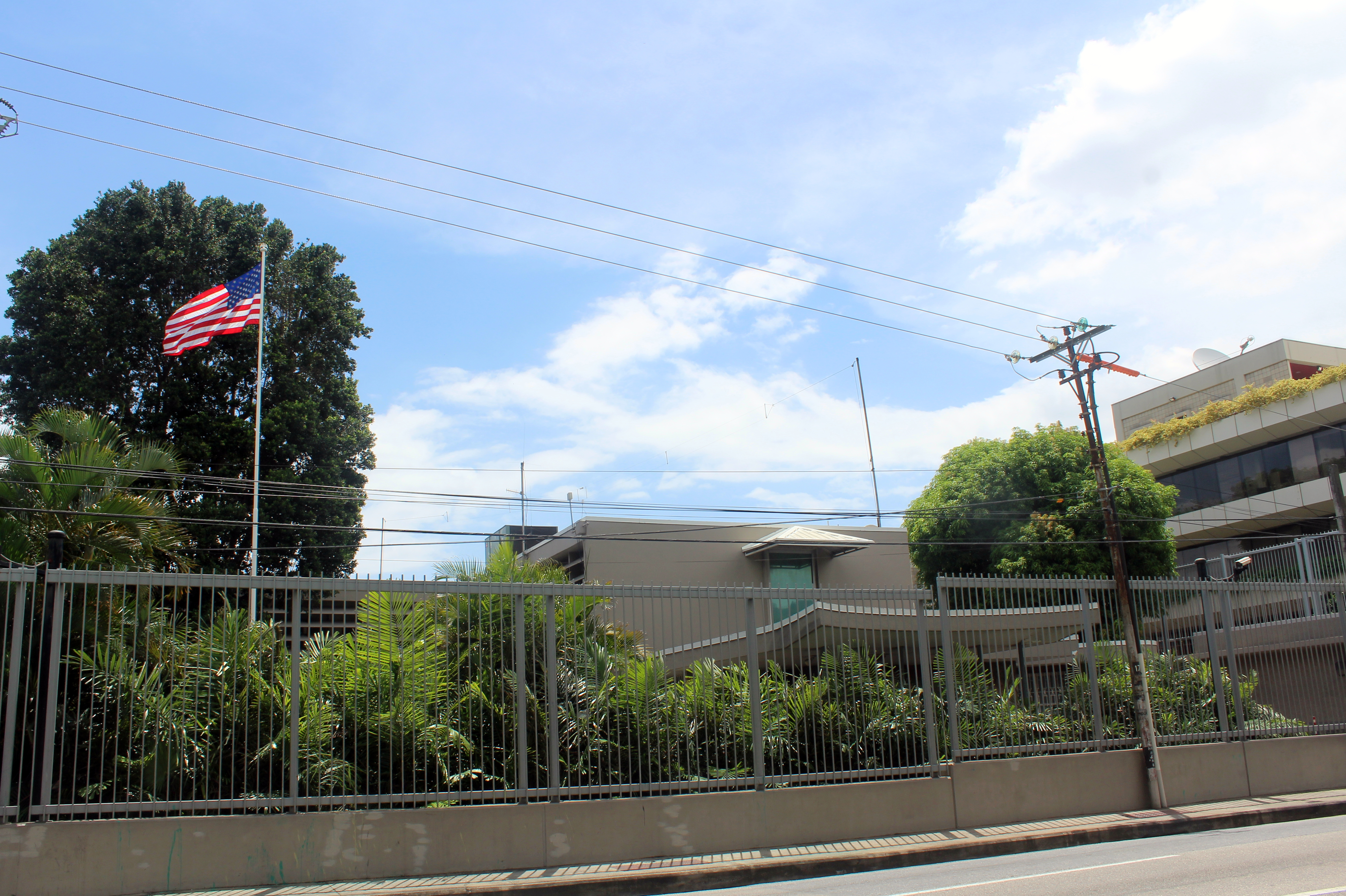
Embassy of the United States

== Consulate-General in Port of Spain ==
- Guyana

== Non-resident embassies and high commissions ==
=== Resident in Brasília, Brazil ===
1. Azerbaijan
2. Bulgaria
3. Cameroon
4. Croatia
5. Georgia
6. Malawi
7. Tanzania

=== Resident in Caracas, Venezuela ===
1. Algeria
2. Egypt
3. Honduras
4. Indonesia
5. Iran
6. Iraq
7. Italy
8. Kuwait
9. Lebanon
10. Malaysia
11. Nicaragua
12. Poland
13. Portugal
14. Saudi Arabia
15. Switzerland
16. Syria
17. Turkey
18. Uruguay

=== Resident in Havana, Cuba ===
1. Guinea
2. Hungary
3. North Korea
4. Romania
5. Slovakia

=== Resident in Ottawa, Canada ===
1. Bangladesh
2. Lesotho
3. Pakistan
4. Thailand
5. Zambia
6. Zimbabwe

=== Resident in Washington, D.C., United States ===
1. Afghanistan
2. Botswana
3. Bolivia
4. Ireland
5. Ivory Coast
6. Liberia
7. Mauritius
8. Paraguay
9. Philippines
10. Serbia
11. Senegal
12. Sierra Leone
13. Sri Lanka
14. Uganda
15. Ukraine

=== Resident in New York City, United States ===
1. Cyprus
2. Eswatini
3. Mozambique
4. Namibia
5. Seychelles

=== Resident in other cities ===
1. Austria (Bogotá)
2. Barbados (Bridgetown)
3. Belgium (Kingston)
4. Czechia (Bogotá)
5. Denmark (Mexico City)
6. Kazakhstan (Mexico City)
7. Morocco (Gros Islet)
8. Greece (Panama City)
9. Israel (Panama City)
10. Norway (Oslo)
11. New Zealand (Wellington)
12. Russia (Georgetown)
13. South Africa (Kingston)
14. Suriname (Georgetown)
15. Sweden (Stockholm)

== See also ==
- Foreign relations of Trinidad and Tobago
- List of diplomatic missions of Trinidad and Tobago
