= 1994 United States Senate election in Arizona =

- November 8, 1994
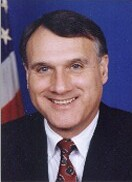

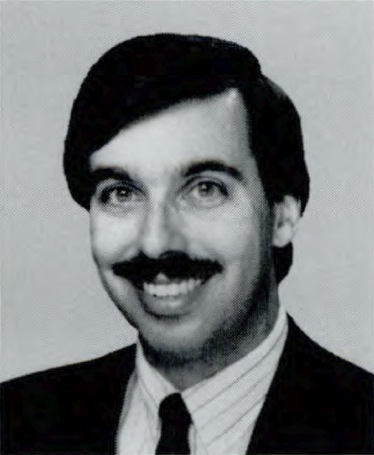

Nominee	Jon Kyl	Sam Coppersmith	Scott Grainger
Party	Republican	Democratic	Libertarian
Popular vote	600,999	442,510	75,493
Percentage	53.71%	39.54%	6.75%
- County results Kyl: 40–50% 50–60% Coppersmith: 40–50% 50–60% 60–70%
U.S. senator before election
Dennis DeConcini
Democratic
Elected U.S. Senator
Jon Kyl
Republican

The 1994 United States Senate election in Arizona was held November 8, 1994. Incumbent Democratic U.S. Senator Dennis DeConcini decided to retire instead of seeking a fourth term. Republican nominee Jon Kyl won the open seat, becoming the first Republican to win Arizona's Class 1 Senate seat since Paul Fannin in 1970. Democrats would not win this seat again, or any Senate race in the state, until Kyrsten Sinema's victory in 2018.

== Democratic primary ==
=== Candidates ===
- Sam Coppersmith, U.S. Representative
- Richard D. Mahoney, Secretary of State of Arizona
- Cindy Resnick, State Senator
- Dave Moss, perennial candidate

=== Results ===
Democratic primary results
Party	Candidate	Votes	%
Democratic	Sam Coppersmith	81,995	32.2%
Democratic	Richard Mahoney	81,863	32.1%
Democratic	Cindy Resnick	75,563	29.6%
Democratic	David Moss	15,612	6.1%
Total votes		200,120	100.0%

== Republican primary ==
=== Candidates ===
- Jon Kyl, U.S. Representative since 1987

=== Results ===
Republican primary results
Party	Candidate	Votes	%
Republican	Jon Kyl	231,275	99.0%
Republican	Write-ins	2,248	1.0%
Total votes		231,733	100.0%

== Libertarian primary ==
=== Candidates ===
- Scott Grainger, engineer

=== Results ===
Libertarian primary results
Party	Candidate	Votes	%
Libertarian	Scott Grainger	5,424	100.0%
Total votes		5,424	100.0%

== General election ==
=== Polling ===
Source	Date	Kyl (R)	Coppersmith (D)
Arizona State University	October 7, 1994	39%	31%
United for Arizona	October 30, 1994	43%	38%
The Rocky Mountain News	October 16, 1994	43%	30%
Arizona State University	November 2, 1994	47%	28%

=== Results ===
General election results
Party	Candidate	Votes	%	±%
Republican	Jon Kyl	600,999	53.71%	+12.66%
Democratic	Sam Coppersmith	442,510	39.54%	−17.17%
Libertarian	Scott Grainger	75,493	6.75%	+4.96%
Write-in		58	0.01%	
Majority		158,489	14.16%	−1.50%
Turnout		1,119,060		
Republican gain from Democratic		Swing		

== See also ==
- 1994 United States Senate elections
