= Visa policy of Trinidad and Tobago =

Policy on permits required to enter Trinidad and Tobago

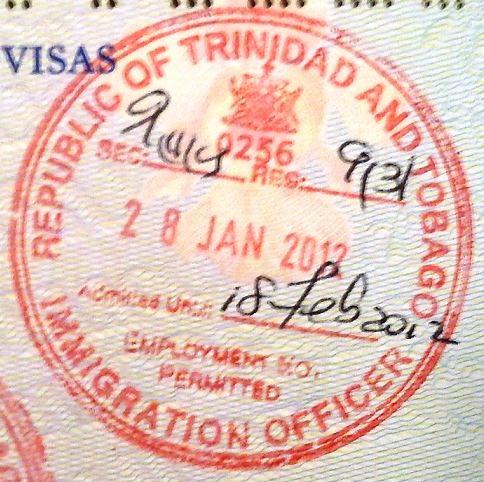
Entry stamp of Trinidad and Tobago

Visitors to Trinidad and Tobago must obtain an e-Visa unless they are citizens of one of the visa-exempt countries or citizens who may obtain a visa on arrival.

== Visa policy map ==
Visa policy of Trinidad and Tobago Trinidad and Tobago Visa not required (90 days) Visa not required (30 days) Visa on arrival / eVisa eVisa

== Visa exemption ==
Holders of passports of the following countries and territories may enter Trinidad and Tobago without a visa for the following period:

90 days

- Antigua and Barbuda
- Argentina
- Bahamas
- Bangladesh
- Barbados
- Belize
- Botswana
- Brazil
- Brunei
- Canada
- Chile
- Colombia
- Costa Rica
- Cuba
- Dominica
- Dominican Republic
- Ecuador
- El Salvador
- Eswatini
- Fiji
- Gambia
- Ghana
- Grenada
- Guatemala
- Guyana
- Honduras
- Hong Kong
- India
- Ireland
- Israel
- Jamaica
- Japan
- Kenya
- Kiribati
- Lesotho
- Malawi
- Malaysia
- Maldives
- Mauritius
- Mexico
- Namibia
- Nauru
- Nicaragua
- Pakistan
- Panama
- Paraguay
- Peru
- Russia
- Saint Kitts and Nevis
- Saint Lucia
- Saint Vincent and the Grenadines
- Samoa
- Seychelles
- Sierra Leone
- Singapore
- Solomon Islands
- South Africa
- South Korea
- Suriname
- Tonga
- Turkey
- Tuvalu
- United Arab Emirates
- United Kingdom
- United States
- Uruguay
- Vanuatu
- Zambia
- Zimbabwe

90 days within any 180 days

- All European Union member states (except Ireland)

- Iceland
- Liechtenstein
- Norway
- Switzerland

30 days

- Albania
- Bosnia and Herzegovina
- Montenegro
- Serbia

Date of visa changes
- 1 October 2007: Cuba
- 30 December 2010: India and Russia

Cancelled:

- 17 June 2019: Venezuela

Citizens of Argentina, Brazil, Colombia, Costa Rica, Iceland, Israel, Liechtenstein, Mexico, Norway, South Korea, Switzerland, and Uruguay may extend their stay.

=== Non-ordinary passports ===
Holders of diplomatic or service/official passports of China and Haiti may enter Trinidad and Tobago without a visa.

== Visa on arrival ==
Citizens of Australia, New Zealand and Philippines may obtain "Waiver of the Visa" on arrival at a cost of TT$400. Citizens of other countries who require a visa may also obtain a "Waiver of the Visa" on arrival if they are holding of a copy of a pre-arranged approval from immigration and if they are not citizens of North Korea, North Macedonia, Venezuela or Vietnam, or holders of normal passports issued by China and Haiti.

According to Timatic, citizens of the following countries are also eligible for a visa on arrival:

- Andorra
- Angola
- Australia
- Bolivia
- Burundi
- Cambodia
- Chad
- Central African Republic
- DRC
- Djibouti
- East Timor
- Gabon
- Ivory Coast
- Madagascar
- Mali
- Marshall Islands
- Mauritania
- Micronesia
- Monaco
- Morocco
- Nepal
- New Zealand
- Niger
- Oman
- Palau
- Philippines
- Republic of the Congo
- Sao Tome and Principe
- Thailand
- Yemen

== Electronic visa (e-Visa) ==
Citizens of other countries that require a visa may obtain an eVisa online.

== Visitor statistics ==
Most visitors arriving in Trinidad and Tobago on short-term basis were from the following countries of nationality:

Country	2016	2015	2014
United States	174,594	182,106	161,557
Canada	50,103	53,191	55,088
United Kingdom	32,528	36,298	37,013
Guyana	23,446	24,332	23,125
Venezuela	20,023	28,105	21,052
Barbados	12,128	12,613	11,643
Jamaica	11,617	12,974	11,951
Grenada	7,279	7,537	6,928
Saint Vincent and the Grenadines	7,051	6,886	6,655
St. Lucia	4,925	4,836	4,436
Germany	4,275	4,431	5,154
France	3,899	4,298	4,615
India	3,879	3,572	3,291
Total	409,995	439,767	412,796

== See also ==
- Visa requirements for Trinidad and Tobago citizens
