= France–Trinidad and Tobago relations =

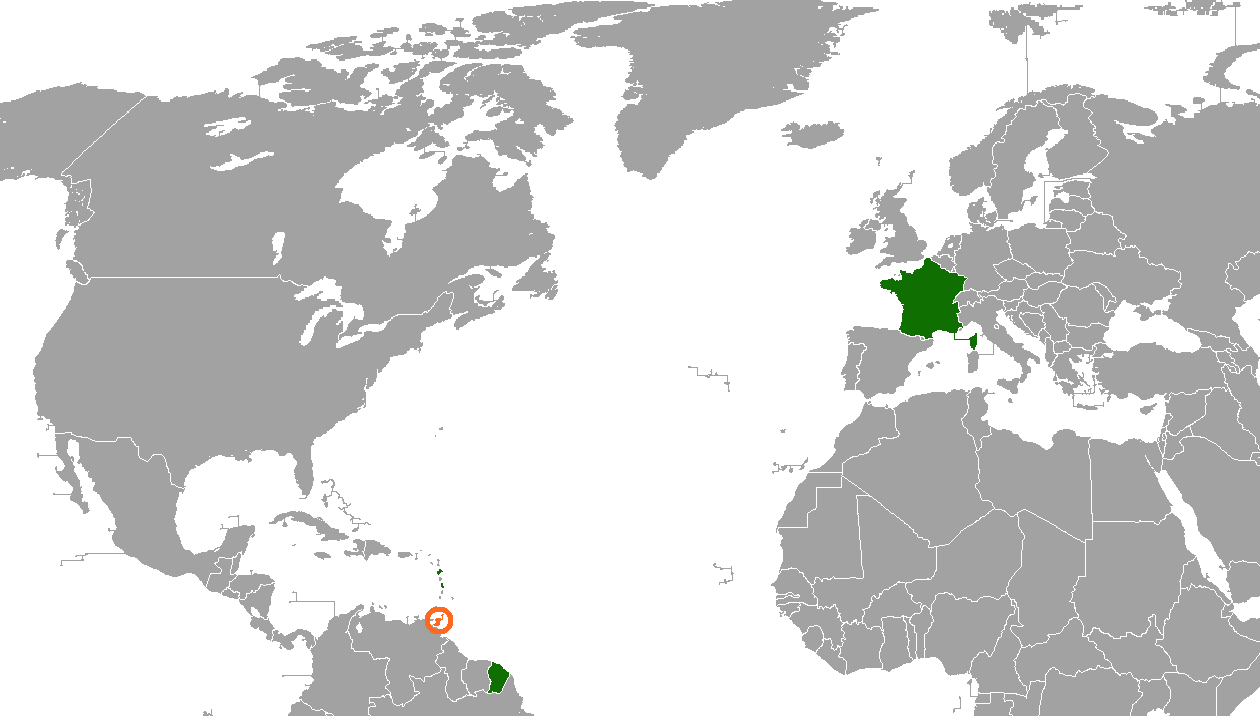

- France: Trinidad and Tobago

Bilateral relations between the countries of France and Trinidad and Tobago have existed for about two hundred years. Currently, France has an embassy in Port of Spain. Trinidad and Tobago is represented in France through its embassy in Brussels (Belgium). Trinidad and Tobago also has bilateral investment agreements with France.

== Colonial history ==
France colonized Tobago during the seventeenth century. France occupied the colony from August 1666 to March 1667. On 6 December 1677, the French destroyed the Dutch colony and claimed the entire island, before restoring it to the Dutch by the first Treaty of Nijmegen on 10 August 1678. In 1751, the French settled colonists on the island, but ceded it to Britain in the Treaty of Paris of 10 February 1763. Nevertheless, most "of the settlers were French, and French influence became dominant." It was again a French colony from 2 June 1781 to 15 April 1793, nominally part of the Lucie département of France from 25 October 1797 to 19 April 1801, and once again a French colony from 30 June 1802 to 30 June 1803.

The Spanish gave many incentives to lure settlers to Trunidad island and, including exemption from taxes for ten years and land grants in accordance to the terms set out in the Cedula. In 1783, the proclamation of a Cedula of Population by the Spanish Crown granted 32 acres (129,000 m^{2}) of land to each Roman Catholic who settled in Trinidad and half as much for each slave that they brought. Uniquely, 16 acres (65,000 m^{2}) was offered to each Free Coloured or Free Person of Colour (gens de couleur libre, as they were later known), and half as much for each slave they brought. French planters with their slaves, free coloureds and mulattos from neighboring islands of Grenada, Guadeloupe, Martinique and Dominica migrated to the Trinidad during the French Revolution. These new immigrants establishing local communities of Blanchisseuse, Champs Fleurs, Paramin, Cascade, Carenage and Laventille. This resulted in Trinidad having the unique feature of a large French-speaking Free Coloured slave-owning class.

By the time Trinidad island was surrendered to the British in 1797, the population had increased to 17,643: 2,086 whites, 4,466 free people of colour, 1,082 Amerindians, and 10,009 African slaves. In addition, there were 159 sugar estates, 130 coffee estates, 60 cocoa estates, and 103 cotton estates. Yet, the island remained unfortified.

== Cultural legacy ==
By the later 1790s, the white upper class on Trinidad "consisted mainly of French creoles", which created "a powerful French cultural influence in Trinidad. This was expressed not only in the widespread use of French Patois (French-lexicon Creole)...but also in the general population's enthusiasm for the Catholic tradition of Carnival." Sean Sheehan explains further that for "about a hundred years, the language spoken in Trinidad and Tobago was a pidgin form of French, which was basically French with Twi or Yoruba words included. Even today, there is a strong element of French in Trini, and in some rural areas, people speak a language that is closer to French than to English."

== Resident diplomatic missions ==
- France has an embassy in Port of Spain.
- Trinidad and Tobago is accredited to France from its embassy in Brussels, Belgium.

== See also ==
- Foreign relations of France
- Foreign relations of Trinidad and Tobago
