= Nigeria–Trinidad and Tobago relations =

- Nigeria: Trinidad and Tobago

Nigeria–Trinidad and Tobago relations are bilateral relations between Nigeria and Trinidad and Tobago. Trinidad and Tobago has a high commission in Abuja and Nigeria has a high commission in Port of Spain. The high commission in Port of Spain is concurrently accredited to Barbados, Dominica, Grenada, Guyana, and Suriname, while the high commission in Abuja is concurrently accredited to Algeria, Cameroon, Côte d'Ivoire, Democratic Republic of Congo, Ethiopia, Ghana, Guinea, Kenya, Liberia, Nigeria, Senegal, Sierra Leone, Tanzania, and Uganda. Currently, the high commissioner in Port of Spain is Abubakar Danlami Ibrahim, while the high commissioner in Abuja is Wendell De Landro.

== History ==
The two nations established bilateral relations on 6 October 1970 when Edwin Ogbu was accredited as the first Nigerian high commissioner to Trinidad and Tobago. However, their shared heritage dates back much further than that. They both achieved independence from the United Kingdom in the early 1960s, and both countries are members of the Commonwealth of Nations. In recent years, the two countries have announced efforts to increase cooperation in areas such as trade and law.

== Resident diplomatic missions ==
- Nigeria has a high commission in Port of Spain.
- Trinidad and Tobago has a high commission in Abuja.

== See also ==
- Foreign relations of Nigeria
- Foreign relations of Trinidad and Tobago
