= Foreign relations of Trinidad and Tobago =

Modern Trinidad and Tobago maintains close relations with its Caribbean neighbours and major North American and European trading partners. As the most industrialized and second-largest country in the English-speaking Caribbean, Trinidad and Tobago has taken a leading role in the Caribbean Community (CARICOM), and strongly supports CARICOM economic integration efforts. It also is active in the Summit of the Americas process and supports the establishment of the Free Trade Area of the Americas, lobbying other nations for seating the Secretariat in Port of Spain.

As a member of CARICOM, Trinidad and Tobago strongly backed efforts by the United States to bring political stability to Haiti, contributing personnel to the Multinational Force in 1994. After its 1962 independence, Trinidad and Tobago joined the United Nations and Commonwealth of Nations. In 1967, it became the first Commonwealth country to join the Organization of American States (OAS). In 1995, Trinidad played host to the inaugural meeting of the Association of Caribbean States and has become the seat of this 35-member grouping, which seeks to further economic progress and integration among its states.

In international forums, Trinidad and Tobago has defined itself as having an independent voting record, but often supports U.S. and EU positions.

Trinidad and Tobago has historically been a trans-shipment point for South American drugs destined for the United States and Europe. This has created much tension in the country's politics.

Trinidad and Tobago is also a member-state of the International Criminal Court, without a Bilateral Immunity Agreement of protection for the U.S. military (as covered under Article 98)

== Trinidad and Tobago and the Commonwealth of Nations ==
Trinidad and Tobago became an independent state in 1962 with Queen Elizabeth II as Queen of Trinidad and Tobago. She was represented by the Governor-General of Trinidad and Tobago.

On August 1, 1976, Trinidad and Tobago became a republic in the Commonwealth of Nations with the last Governor-General, Sir Ellis Clarke becoming the first President of Trinidad and Tobago.

== Diplomatic relations ==
List of countries which Trinidad and Tobago maintains diplomatic relations with:

#	Country	Date
1	Canada	31 August 1962
2	France	31 August 1962
3	India	31 August 1962
4	Israel	31 August 1962
5	United Kingdom	31 August 1962
6	United States	31 August 1962
7	Venezuela	14 September 1962
8	Netherlands	19 October 1962
9	Lebanon	1962
10	Jamaica	18 June 1963
11	Switzerland	12 July 1963
12	Germany	28 August 1963
13	Pakistan	1963
14	Italy	4 January 1964
15	Chile	3 February 1964
16	Ghana	1 March 1964
17	Egypt	22 March 1964
18	Japan	22 May 1964
19	Argentina	30 October 1964
20	Senegal	21 November 1964
21	Brazil	21 January 1965
22	Ethiopia	7 July 1965
23	Uruguay	22 November 1965
24	Liberia	6 December 1965
25	Algeria	1965
26	Mexico	29 April 1966
27	Guyana	26 May 1966
28	Sweden	July 1966
29	Barbados	30 November 1966
30	Spain	15 June 1967
31	Ecuador	9 November 1967
32	Peru	5 February 1968
33	Colombia	22 February 1968
34	Dominican Republic	May 1968
35	Luxembourg	17 December 1969
36	Belgium	10 May 1970
37	Tanzania	2 July 1970
38	Nigeria	6 October 1970
39	Zambia	17 February 1971
40	Costa Rica	21 May 1971
41	Norway	19 November 1971
42	Sri Lanka	November 1971
43	Singapore	15 December 1971
44	Finland	17 December 1971
45	Nicaragua	1971
46	Syria	11 January 1972
47	Turkey	22 May 1972
48	Denmark	23 May 1972
49	Cyprus	25 May 1972
50	Austria	2 August 1972
51	Romania	25 November 1972
52	Cuba	8 December 1972
53	Ivory Coast	15 January 1973
54	Kuwait	3 September 1973
55	Libya	September 1973
56	Iran	September 1973
57	Indonesia	12 October 1973
58	Guinea	1973
59	Kenya	1973
60	Australia	7 January 1974
61	Iraq	17 January 1974
62	Haiti	31 January 1974
63	Serbia	15 March 1974
64	Uganda	5 June 1974
65	Russia	6 June 1974
66	China	20 June 1974
67	Mauritius	June 1974
68	Saudi Arabia	5 July 1974
69	New Zealand	9 October 1974
70	Hungary	7 June 1975
71	Sierra Leone	17 July 1975
72	Malaysia	11 June 1976
73	Cameroon	19 December 1976
74	Grenada	18 February 1977
75	Portugal	2 September 1977
76	Suriname	16 January 1978
—	Holy See	23 July 1978
77	Czech Republic	16 November 1979
78	Saint Lucia	1979
79	Greece	10 October 1980
80	Belize	21 September 1981
81	Antigua and Barbuda	6 December 1982
82	Dominica	June 1983
83	Saint Kitts and Nevis	19 September 1983
84	Bangladesh	22 September 1983
85	Bahamas	1983
86	South Korea	23 July 1985
87	Thailand	22 January 1986
88	North Korea	22 January 1986
89	El Salvador	11 May 1994
90	Panama	24 May 1994
91	Paraguay	24 May 1994
92	Guatemala	25 May 1994
93	Honduras	2 June 1994
94	Namibia	1 December 1994
95	South Africa	10 January 1995
96	Slovenia	9 May 1997
97	Malawi	21 April 1998
98	Botswana	11 May 1998
99	Slovakia	28 May 1998
100	Poland	13 August 1998
101	Morocco	4 November 1998
102	Ukraine	27 September 1999
103	Philippines	18 April 2000
104	Ireland	13 December 2000
105	Latvia	11 March 2003
106	Zimbabwe	23 July 2009
107	Malta	24 September 2009
108	Brunei	24 November 2009
109	Maldives	24 November 2009
110	Seychelles	24 November 2009
111	Vanuatu	24 November 2009
112	Mozambique	10 February 2010
113	Georgia	8 April 2011
114	Azerbaijan	11 April 2011
115	Belarus	12 April 2011
116	Montenegro	15 April 2011
117	Bosnia and Herzegovina	19 April 2011
118	Bulgaria	20 September 2011
119	Croatia	14 December 2011
120	Estonia	2 April 2012
121	Lithuania	26 September 2012
122	Lesotho	2 November 2012
123	Iceland	8 May 2013
124	Timor-Leste	24 September 2013
125	Kazakhstan	16 January 2014
126	Solomon Islands	30 January 2014
127	Liechtenstein	31 January 2014
128	Albania	13 May 2014
129	Andorra	26 September 2014
130	Fiji	18 March 2016
131	Qatar	6 June 2019
132	Mongolia	24 February 2021
133	Tajikistan	26 February 2021
134	Rwanda	26 May 2022
135	Nepal	16 June 2022
136	Bahrain	21 September 2022
137	Angola	7 December 2022
138	Vietnam	1 February 2023
139	Cape Verde	14 March 2023
140	Oman	27 March 2023
141	Moldova	25 May 2023
142	Uzbekistan	15 June 2023
143	Turkmenistan	21 June 2023
144	Armenia	29 August 2023
145	Burundi	1 September 2023
—	State of Palestine	22 September 2024
146	Benin	23 September 2025
147	Monaco	24 September 2025
148	Tunisia	27 September 2025
149	Gambia	9 March 2026
150	Djibouti	25 March 2026
151	Palau	25 March 2026
152	Eritrea	29 April 2026
153	Kyrgyzstan	29 April 2026
154	Jordan	6 July 2026
155	Samoa	25 August 2026
156	North Macedonia	21 September 2026
157	San Marino	24 September 2026
158	Gabon	25 September 2026
159	Laos	29 September 2026
160	Bolivia	Unknown
161	Eswatini	Unknown
162	Saint Vincent and the Grenadines	Unknown
163	Tuvalu	Unknown
164	United Arab Emirates	Unknown

== Bilateral relations ==
Country	Formal Relations Began	Notes
Armenia	29 August 2023	See Armenia–Trinidad and Tobago relations
Australia	7 January 1974	See Australia–Trinidad and Tobago relations
Barbados	30 November 1966	See Barbados–Trinidad and Tobago relations
Brazil	27 July 1965	See Brazil–Trinidad and Tobago relations Brazil and Trinidad and Tobago enjoy a cordial and active relations Several mutual visits of Heads of State have occurred starting in 2008, when a MOU for cooperation on energy industry was signed.
Canada	31 August 1962	See Canada–Trinidad and Tobago relations
Chile	3 February 1964	See Chile–Trinidad and Tobago relations
China	20 June 1974	See China–Trinidad and Tobago relations
Cuba	8 December 1972	See Cuba–Trinidad and Tobago relations
Cyprus	25 May 1972	Cyprus is represented in Trinidad and Tobago by its embassy in New York City.; Both countries are full members of the Commonwealth of Nations.
France	31 August 1962	See France–Trinidad and Tobago relations Both countries established diplomatic relations on 31 August 1962 Bilateral relations between the countries France and Trinidad and Tobago have existed for about two hundred years. Currently, France has an embassy in Port of Spain. Trinidad and Tobago is represented in France through its embassy in Brussels (Belgium). Trinidad and Tobago also has bilateral investment agreements with France.
Georgia	8 April 2011	Georgia is represented in Trinidad and Tobago by its embassy in Brasília.
Guyana	26 May 1966	See Guyana–Trinidad and Tobago relations Both countries established diplomatic relations on 26 May 1966. The two share many similarities between each other due to their shared history in the Commonwealth of Nations along with having similar language, culture, demographics and religions. Both countries had substantial numbers of indentured servants from India and slaves from Africa imported into their country. In the 1970s, Trinidad and Tobago gave Guyana substantial oil exports on credit and in the 1990s, forgave hundred of millions of dollars of debt under the Paris Club Agreement. In 2017, Guyana established its first High Commission in Port of Spain. In 2018, Both countries signed a MOU(Memorandum of Understanding) on Energy Cooperation.
India	31 August 1962	See India–Trinidad and Tobago relations Both countries established diplomatic relations on 31 August 1962 when the status of the Commissioner of India in Trinidad and Tobago was raised to that of High Commissioner (Ambassador) Republic of India operates a High Commission in Port of Spain, whilst Republic of Trinidad and Tobago operates a High Commission in New Delhi.
Jamaica	18 June 1963	See Jamaica–Trinidad and Tobago relations Both countries established diplomatic relations on 18 June 1963: Jamaica has a High Commission in Port of Spain.; Trinidad and Tobago has a High Commission in Kingston.
Mexico	29 April 1966	See Mexico–Trinidad and Tobago relations: Mexico has an embassy in Port of Spain.; Trinidad and Tobago is accredited to Mexico from its embassy in Washington, D.C., United States.
Peru	5 February 1968	See Peru–Trinidad and Tobago relations Both countries established diplomatic relations on 5 February 1968: Peru has an embassy in Port of Spain; Trinidad and Tobago has a Consulate in Lima
Russia	6 June 1974	See Russia–Trinidad and Tobago relations The Soviet Union and Trinidad and Tobago have established diplomatic relations on 6 June 1974. Both countries have interests with each other since the Soviet Union. In August 1992, Trinidad recognized Russia as the USSR's successor. Currently, Russia is represented in Trinidad and Tobago through a non-resident embassy in Georgetown (Guyana). In 2004, Sergey Lavrov and Knowlson Gift signed the protocol on the political consultations between the two Ministries. In April 2005 the Chamber of Commerce and Industry of the Russian Federation and the Chamber of Industry and Commerce of the Republic of Trinidad and Tobago signed the cooperation agreement. In 2004, the Russian Cossack folk dance had nine concerts in Port of Spain, San Fernando, Couva, and Tobago.
Singapore	15 December 1971	See Singapore–Trinidad and Tobago relations
South Africa	10 January 1995	See South Africa–Trinidad and Tobago relations
Spain	15 June 1967	See Spain–Trinidad and Tobago relations
Turkey	22 May 1972	Both countries established diplomatic relations on 22 May 1972: Turkey has an embassy in Port of Spain.; Trade volume between the two countries was 120.8 million USD in 2019 (Trinidad's exports/imports: 52.4/68.4 million USD).
United Kingdom	31 August 1962	See Trinidad and Tobago–United Kingdom relations Prince Charles in Trinidad and Tobago, March 2008. Trinidad and Tobago established diplomatic relations with the United Kingdom on 31 August 1962.: Trinidad and Tobago maintains a high commission in London.; The United Kingdom is accredited to its high commission in Port of Spain.; The UK governed Trinidad and Tobago from 1797 to 1962, when Trinidad and Tobago achieved full independence. Both countries share common membership of the Caribbean Development Bank, Commonwealth, the International Criminal Court, the United Nations, the World Trade Organization, and the CARIFORUM–UK Economic Partnership Agreement. Bilaterally the two countries have a Double Taxation Convention,
United States	31 August 1962	See Trinidad and Tobago–United States relations Both countries established diplomatic relations on 31 August 1962 United States embassy in Port of Spain. The United States and Trinidad and Tobago enjoy cordial relations. U.S. interests there and throughout the hemisphere focus on increasing investment and trade, and ensuring more stable supplies of energy. They also include enhancing Trinidad and Tobago's political and social stability and positive regional role through assistance in drug interdiction, health issues, and legal affairs. The U.S. embassy was established in Port of Spain in 1962, replacing the former consulate-general.: Trinidad and Tobago has an embassy in Washington, D.C.; United States has an embassy in Port of Spain.
Venezuela	14 September 1962	See Trinidad and Tobago–Venezuela relations Both countries established diplomatic relations on 14 September 1962: Trinidad and Tobago has an embassy in Caracas.; Venezuela has an embassy in Port of Spain.

== International organisations ==
On its independence in 1962, Trinidad and Tobago joined the United Nations and the Commonwealth of Nations. In 1967, it became the first Commonwealth country to join the Organization of American States (OAS).

In 1995, Trinidad played host to the inaugural meeting of the Association of Caribbean States and has become the seat of this 35-member grouping, which seeks to further economic progress and integration among its states.

As the most industrialized and second-largest country in the English-speaking Caribbean, Trinidad and Tobago has taken a leading role in the Caribbean Community (CARICOM), and strongly supports CARICOM economic integration efforts. It also is active in the Summit of the Americas process and supports the establishment of the Free Trade Area of the Americas, lobbying other nations for seating the Secretariat in Port of Spain. As a member of CARICOM, Trinidad and Tobago strongly backed efforts by the United States to bring political stability to Haiti, contributing personnel to the Multinational Force in 1994.

Trinidad and Tobago is also a member-state of the International Criminal Court, without a Bilateral Immunity Agreement of protection for the U.S. military (as covered under Article 98).

In July 2013 the President of Venezuela, Nicolás Maduro invited Trinidad and Tobago to join the Union of South American Nations.

== See also ==
- List of diplomatic missions in Trinidad and Tobago
- List of diplomatic missions of Trinidad and Tobago
- Trinidad and Tobago passport
- War on drugs
