= Yeda Pessoa de Castro =

Brazilian ethnolinguist

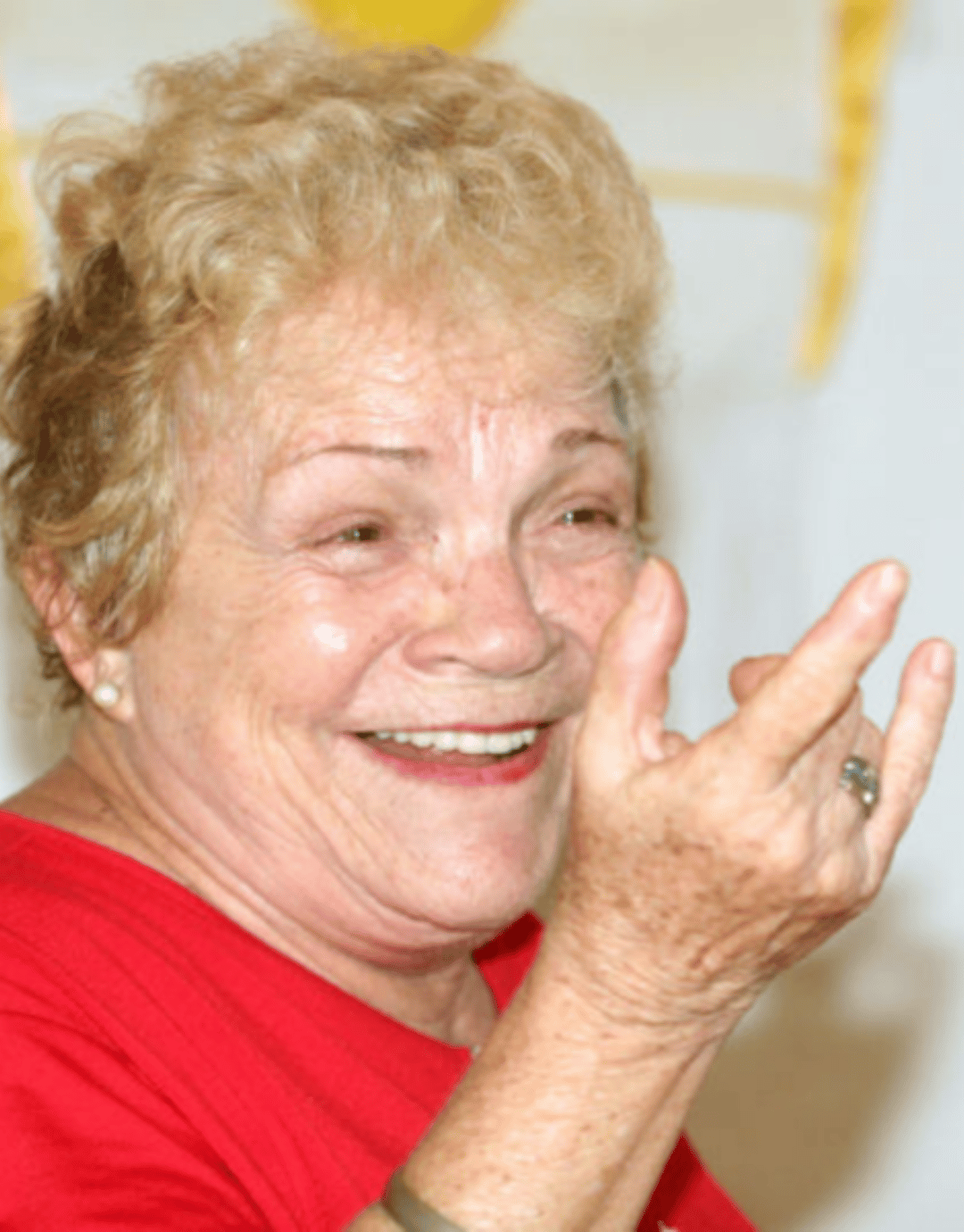
- Born: 3 October 1936 (age 89); Salvador, Bahia, Brazil
- Education: National University of Zaire (PhD)
- Occupation: Ethnolinguist

Yeda Pessoa de Castro is a Brazilian ethnolinguist and anthropologist. She is a Technical Consultant in African Languages for the Museu da Língua Portuguesa at the Estação da Luz in São Paulo, a Member of the Academia de Letras da Bahia, and of the ANPOLL's GT de Literatura Oral e Popular.

== Early life and education ==
Castro was born in Salvador, Bahia on 3 October 1936. She completed a PhD in African Languages from the National University of Zaire. Castro was the first Brazilian to defend a post-graduate thesis at an African university, and the only one so far in her specialty.

== Career ==
Castro is an expert on African languages and linguistics. In Bahia, she was the Director of the Centro de Estudos Afro-Orientais, founded the Afro-Brazilian Museum in Salvador, and she is currently a Visiting Professor in the Post-Graduation Program for Languages Studies at the University of the State of Bahia, where she teaches African languages and cultures in Brazil. She previously worked as a teacher at the Federal University of Bahia. She also is Director and founder of the GEAALC: Studies Group of African and Afro-Brazilian Languages and Cultures. Over her career, she has served as Visiting Professor at universities in Africa and the Caribbean. Castro was the cultural attaché at the Brazilian Embassy in Trinidad and Tobago.

=== Memberships ===
- Technical Consultant in African Languages for the Estação da Luz da Nossa Língua Project, by the Roberto Marinho Foundation, São Paulo, from 2004.
- Counselor of the Palmares Cultural Foundation, Ministry of Culture, Brasília, 2001-2003.
- Cultural Attache at the Brazilian Embassy, Port of Spain, Trinidad and Tobago, 1986-1988.
- Consultant and advisor in developing projects in Education at the State University of Santa Cruz - UESC / Ba - Department of Arts and Letters, Kawe Center for Afro-Bahian Regional Studies, 2000-2001.
- Member of the Scientific Council and the Reading Committee of the International Colloquium "Le Monde et le Gabon Iberique, Université Omar Bongo [5], Libreville, Gabon, May/2002.
- Permanent Member of the Scientific Board of the Journal Kilombo, publication of [CERAFIA], Omar Bongo University, Gabon
- Reviewer for [CAPES] and various books, magazines and scientific journals in Brazil and abroad.

== Books ==
- (2009) - Falares africanos na Bahia: um vocabulário afro-brasileiro. Rio de Janeiro: Academia Brasileira de Letras/ Topbooks Editora e Distribuidora de Livros Ltda. (2ª ed. - new print)
- (2005) - Falares africanos na Bahia: um vocabulário afro-brasileiro. Rio de Janeiro: Academia Brasileira de Letras/ Topbooks Editora e Distribuidora de Livros Ltda. (2ª ed.)
- (2002) - A língua mina-jeje no Brasil: um falar africano em Ouro Preto do século XVIII. Belo Horizonte: Fundação João Pinheiro (Coleção Mineiriana).
- (2001) - Falares africanos na Bahia - um vocabulário afro-brasileiro. Rio de Janeiro, Academia Brasileira de Letras/ Topbooks Editora e Distribuidora de Livros Ltda.

== Awards and honors ==
- Comendadora of the Order of Rio Branco by the Ministério das Relações Exteriores in 1997.
- Comenda Maria Quitéria by the Câmara de Vereadores of the City of Salvador in 1989.
- Socio-Meritorious by the Afro-Brazilian Cult Foundation of Bahia - FEBACAB in 1994.
- Honored as a great benefactor of the Afro-Brazilian Bantu Terreiros components of the Eco-Bantu, in São Paulo, 2008.
- Honored by the Afoxé Filhos do Congo, Carnival 2007. Salvador, Bahia.
- Honored by the Cultural Group Afoxé Loni for her life and work devoted to the study of the Afro-Brazilian Culture and Language, at the Carnival of Cultures in Berlin, Germany in May 2008.
