= Coromoto Godoy =

Venezuelan diplomat

Coromoto Godoy Calderón
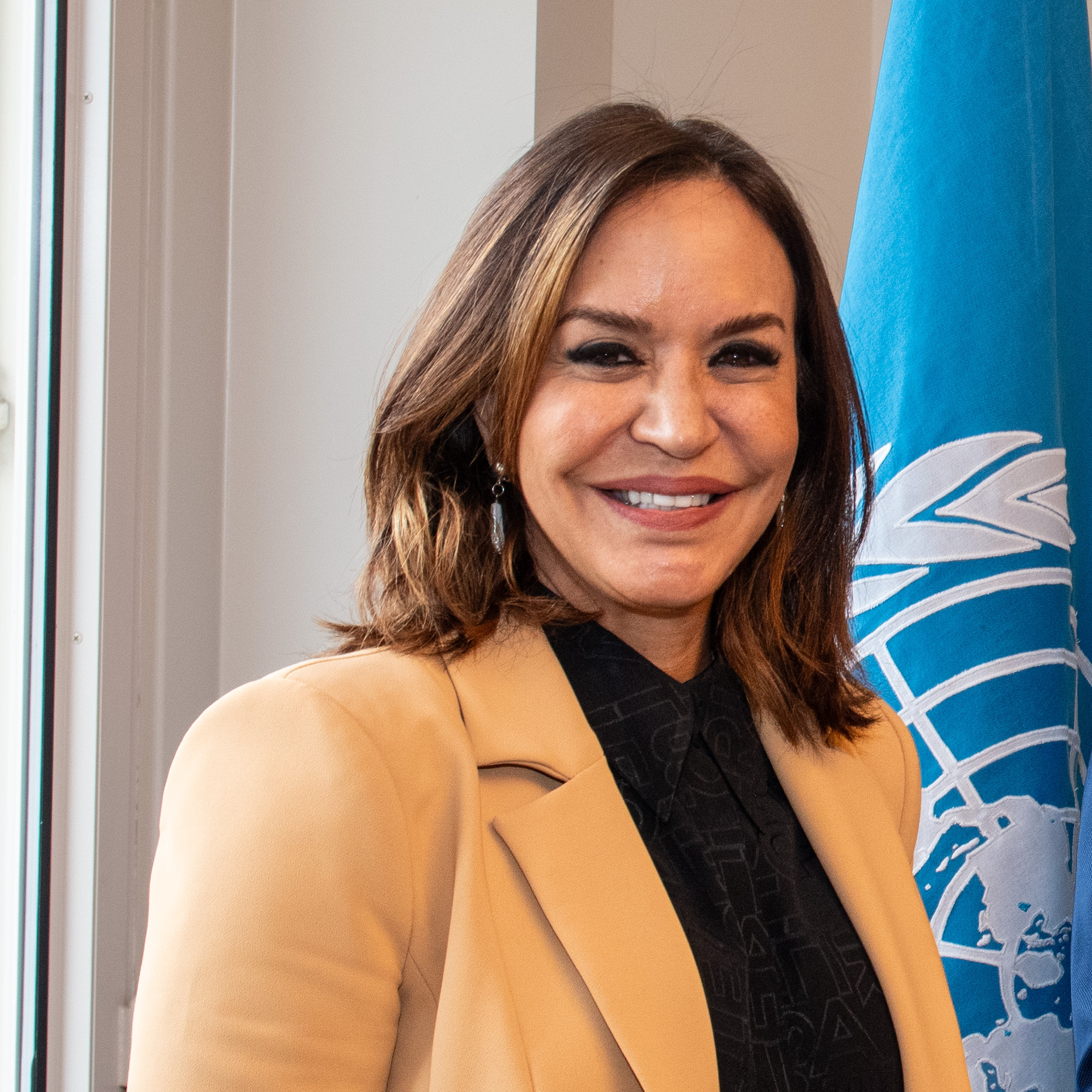

Minister of Foreign Trade of the Bolivarian Republic of Venezuela
- Incumbent
- Assumed office January 2023

Ambassador of Venezuela to Spain

Ambassador of Venezuela to India and Nepal
- In office 2019–2022

Ambassador of Venezuela to Trinidad and Tobago between
- In office 2012–2019

Personal details
- Born: c. 1965
- Relatives: Humberto Calderón Berti (uncle)
- Education: Central University of Venezuela
- Occupation: Diplomat

Coromoto Godoy Calderón (c. 12 February 1966) She is a Venezuelan diplomat. During her diplomatic career, she served as ambassador for the governments of Hugo Chávez and Nicolás Maduro in Trinidad and Tobago, India, and Spain. In 2024 she was appointed vice minister for Europe.

== Career ==
Coromoto graduated as a lawyer from the Central University of Venezuela (UCV), specializing in analysis, planning and strategic negotiation at the Universidad Interactiva de Málaga, in Spain. She has worked in the foreign service since the early years of the Hugo Chávez government, since December 2000, serving as Venezuela's ambassador to Trinidad and Tobago between 2012 and 2019 and later as ambassador to India and Nepal between 2019 and 2022.

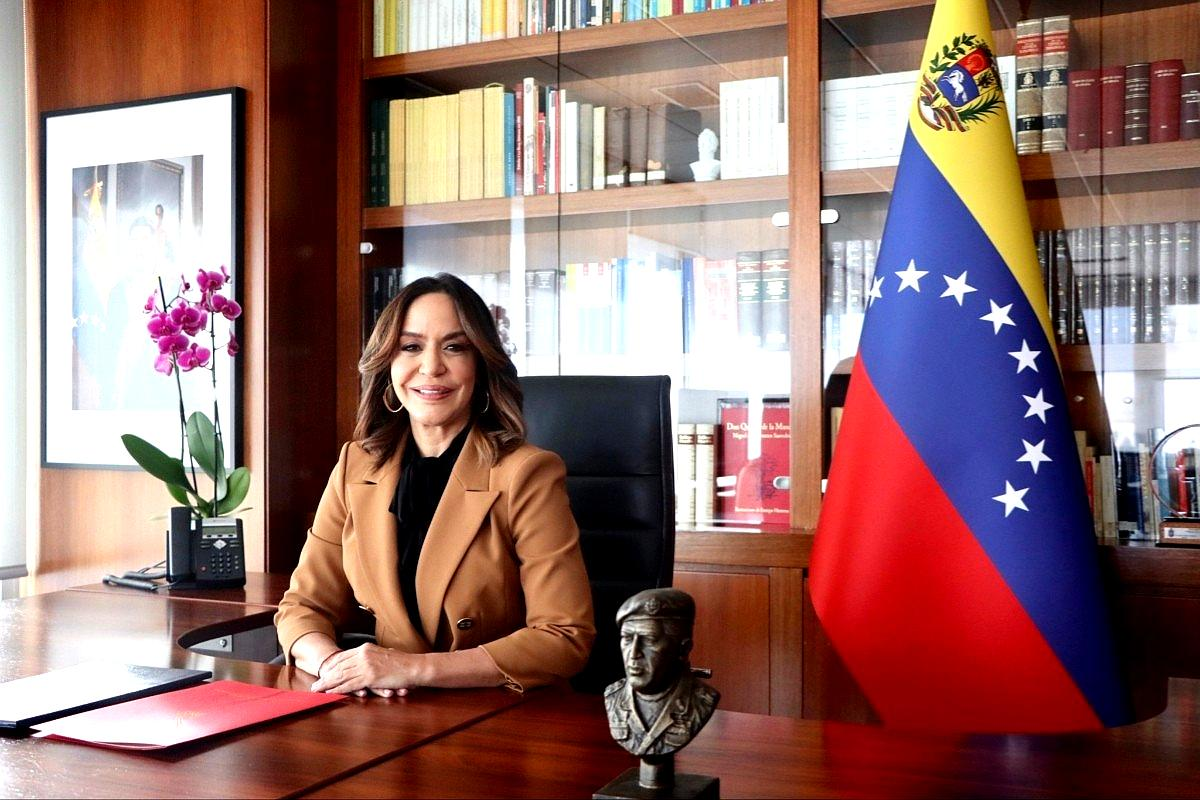
Coromoto Godoy Ministra del Poder Popular de Comercio Exterior

In early 2021 she began serving as Venezuela's chargé d'affaires in Spain. After presenting her documents as ambassador to the Spanish chancellery in January 2023, Godoy presented her credentials before King Felipe VI in May, along with the ambassador appointed by Nicaragua to Spain.

In February 2024 she was appointed vice minister for Europe by President Maturo.

== Personal life ==
Godoy is the niece of Humberto Calderón Berti, former Venezuelan oil minister and former president of Petróleos de Venezuela (PDVSA).

== See also ==
- India–Venezuela relations
- Spain–Venezuela relations
- Trinidad and Tobago–Venezuela relations
