= Afro-Brazilian Museum =

Museum in Salvador, Bahia, Brazil

Coordinates: 12.9727°S 38.5098°W

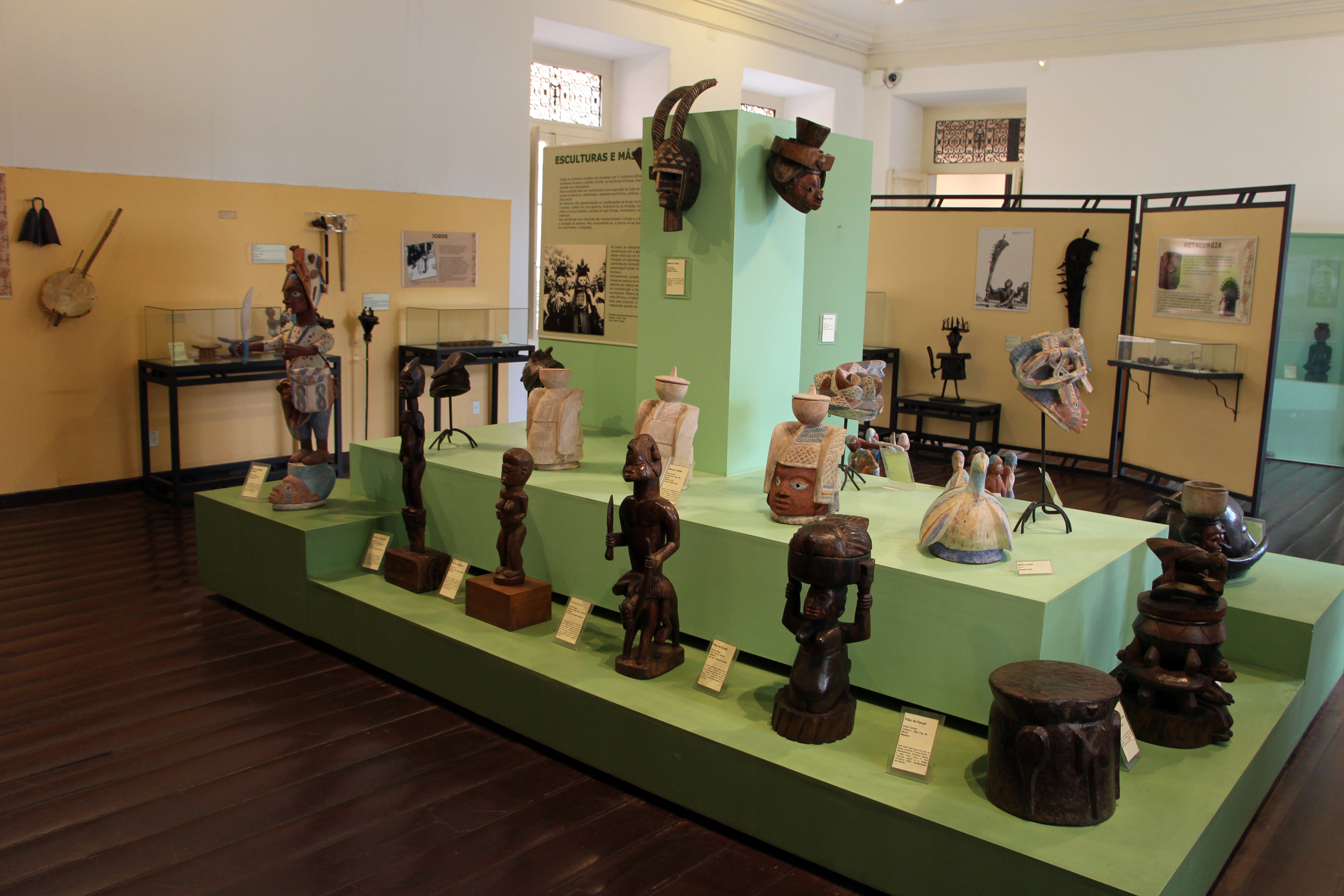
Display

The Afro-Brazilian Museum in Salvador, Bahia, Brazil, was inaugurated on 7 January 1982 by the then Director of the Center for Afro-Oriental Studies (CEAO), Dr. Yeda Pessoa de Castro, through an agreement between the Ministries of Foreign Affairs and Education and Culture of Brazil, the government of Bahia, the city of Salvador and the Federal University of Bahia.

It is an institution that aims to defend, study and disseminate everything that relates to African-Brazilian themes. To this end, it features a collection of original or African-inspired exhibits, due either to work and technology or the arts and religions. In this field, there is also an exhibit of Brazilian-created objects related to the African-Brazilian religion in Bahia.
