= Australia–Trinidad and Tobago relations =

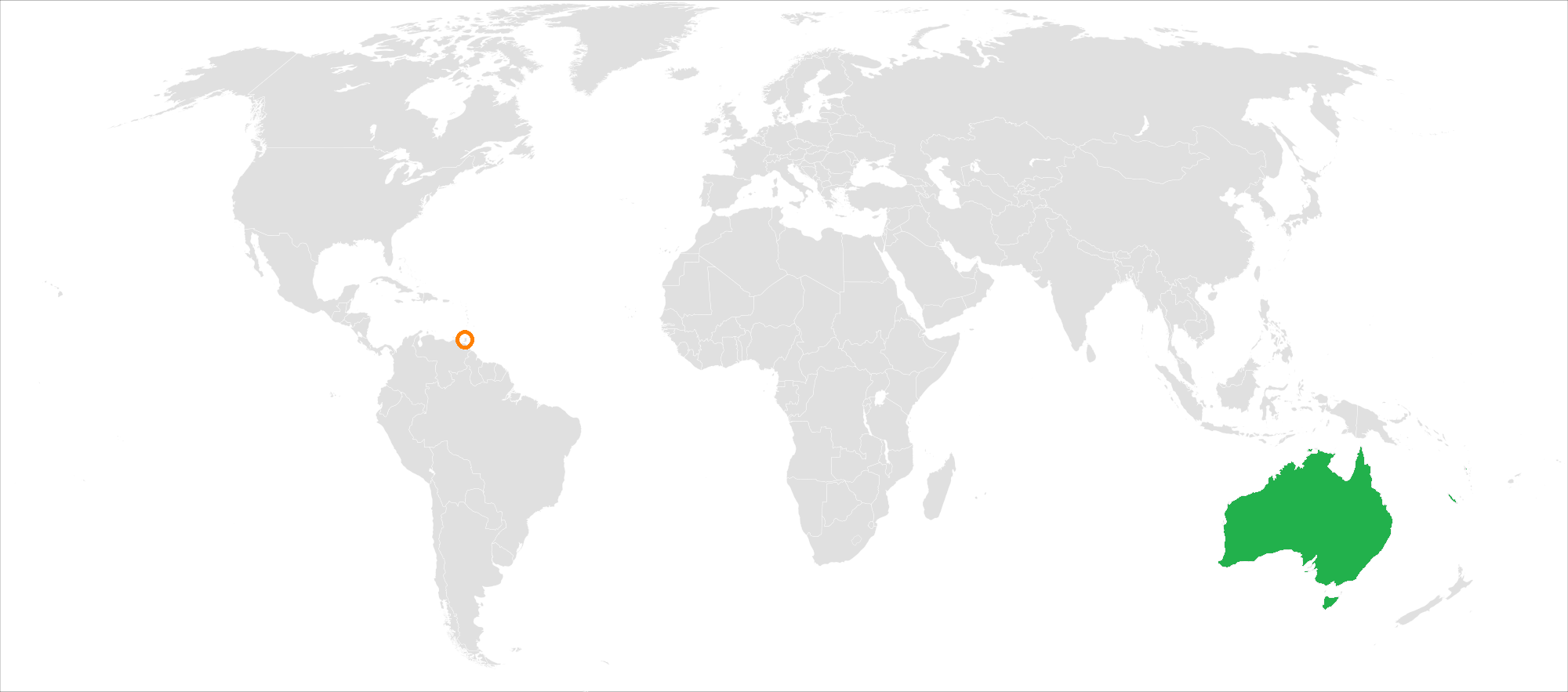

- Australia: Trinidad and Tobago

Australia maintains a High Commission in the City of Port of Spain, and the Republic of Trinidad and Tobago maintains non-resident representation in Australia. Both nations formally established diplomatic relations on 7 January 1974. Both countries are members of the Commonwealth of Nations, and comprised as former parts of the British Empire.

== History ==
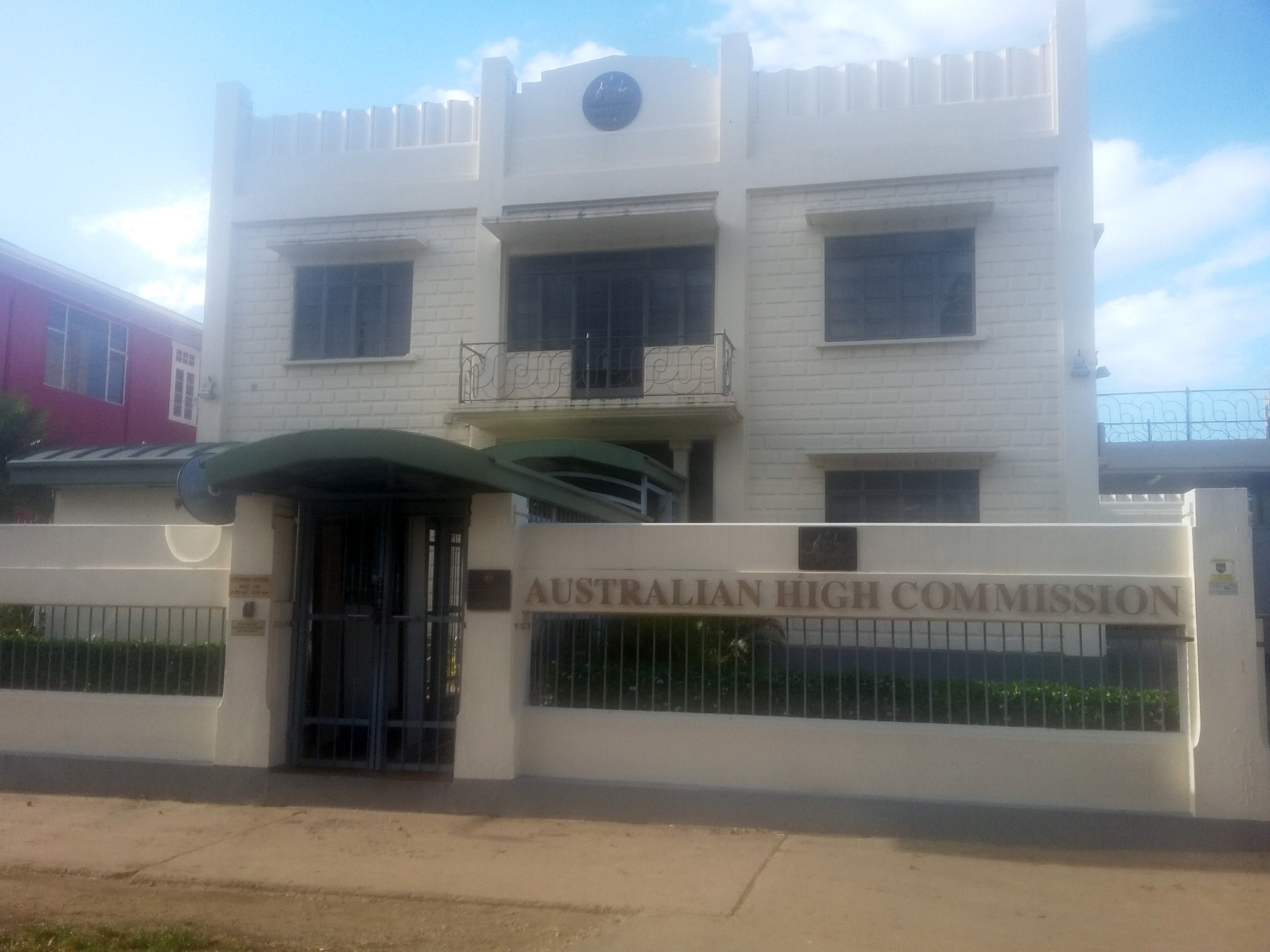
Australian high commission in Port of Spain

In 2004, due in part to the robust trade by Australian companies with Trinidad and Tobago's oil sector the Australian government set up the Australian High Commission in Port of Spain. It now serves 14 other Caribbean countries.

== Trade ==
Trinidad and Tobago is Australia's largest trading partner in the Caribbean.

== See also ==
- Foreign relations of Australia
- Foreign relations of Trinidad and Tobago
