= South Africa–Trinidad and Tobago relations =

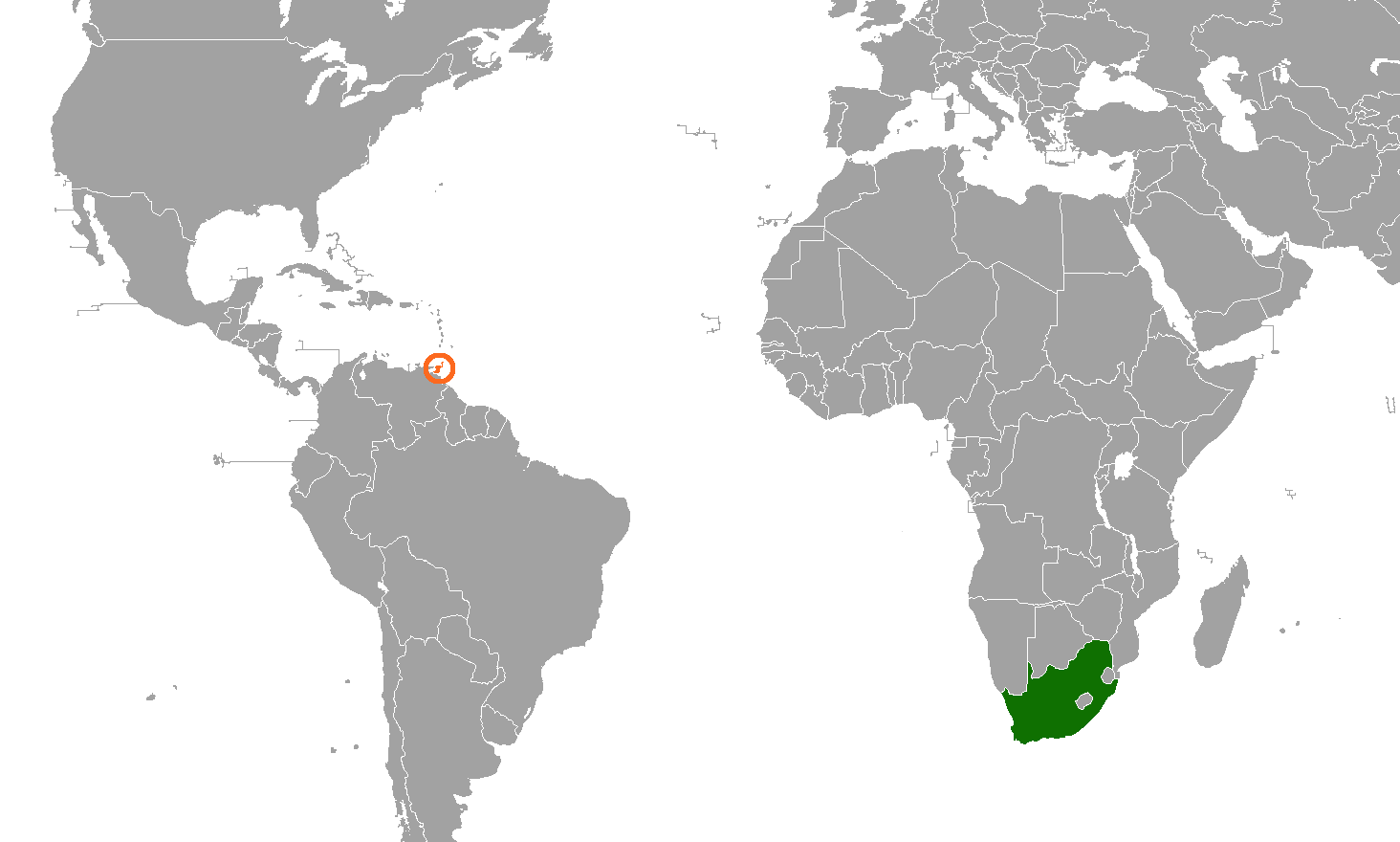

- South Africa: Trinidad and Tobago

South Africa-Trinidad and Tobago relations refers to the bilateral relations between South Africa and Trinidad and Tobago. Diplomatic relations were established on 10 January 1995. Both nations are members of the Commonwealth of Nations. South Africa closed its diplomatic mission to Trinidad and Tobago in 2021.

== History ==
Trinidad chose not to have relations with South Africa until after the Apartheid ended. Non-residential diplomatic relations were formally established in 1995 and in 1998, Ms T Luthuli- Gcabashe, South Africa's Non Resident High Commissioner presented her credentials to Trinidad and Tobago. In 1999, Trinidad attended a Commonwealth Law Ministers Conference alongside South Africa. Mr Ruphus Matibe visited Trinidad in 2001 to explore ways to boost cultural cooperation. In 2002, they agreed to establish a Carnival, a Caribbean festival, in South Africa with Trinidad's Guidance. In 2004, Trinidad opened its first High Commission in Pretoria and South Africa opened its first high Commission in Port of Spain in the 2010s.

== Trade ==
In 2017, Trinidad exported 17.8 Million US dollars' worth of goods to South Africa while South Africa exported US$7.45 Million dollars to Trinidad and Tobago, with most exports being Delivery Trucks.

== See also ==
- Foreign relations of South Africa
- Foreign relations of Trinidad and Tobago
