= Chile–Trinidad and Tobago relations =

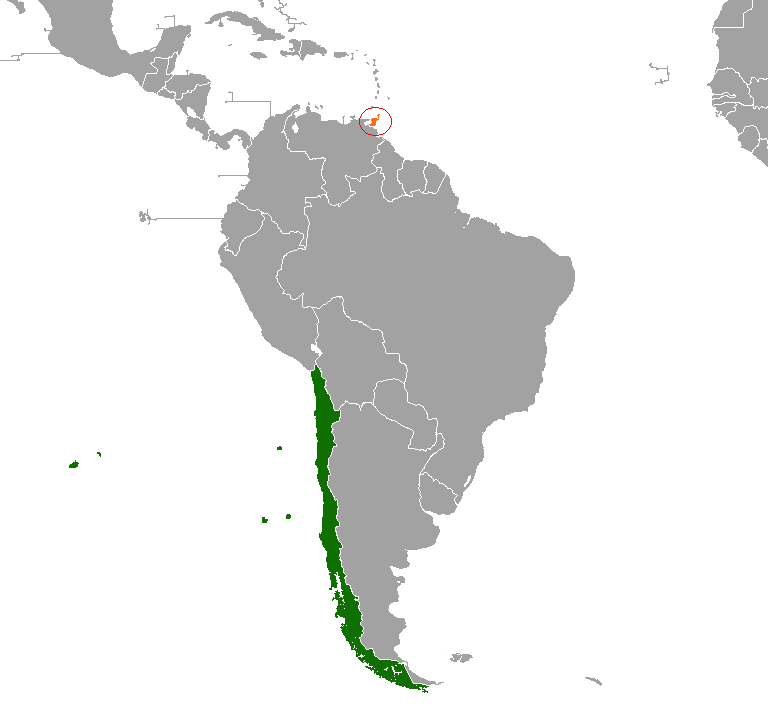

- Chile: Trinidad and Tobago

Chile–Trinidad and Tobago relations refers to the bilateral relations between Chile and Trinidad and Tobago. Chile has an embassy in Port of Spain. Trinidad and Tobago is accredited to Chile from its embassy in Brasília, Brazil. Both countries are members of the Community of Latin American and Caribbean States.

== History ==
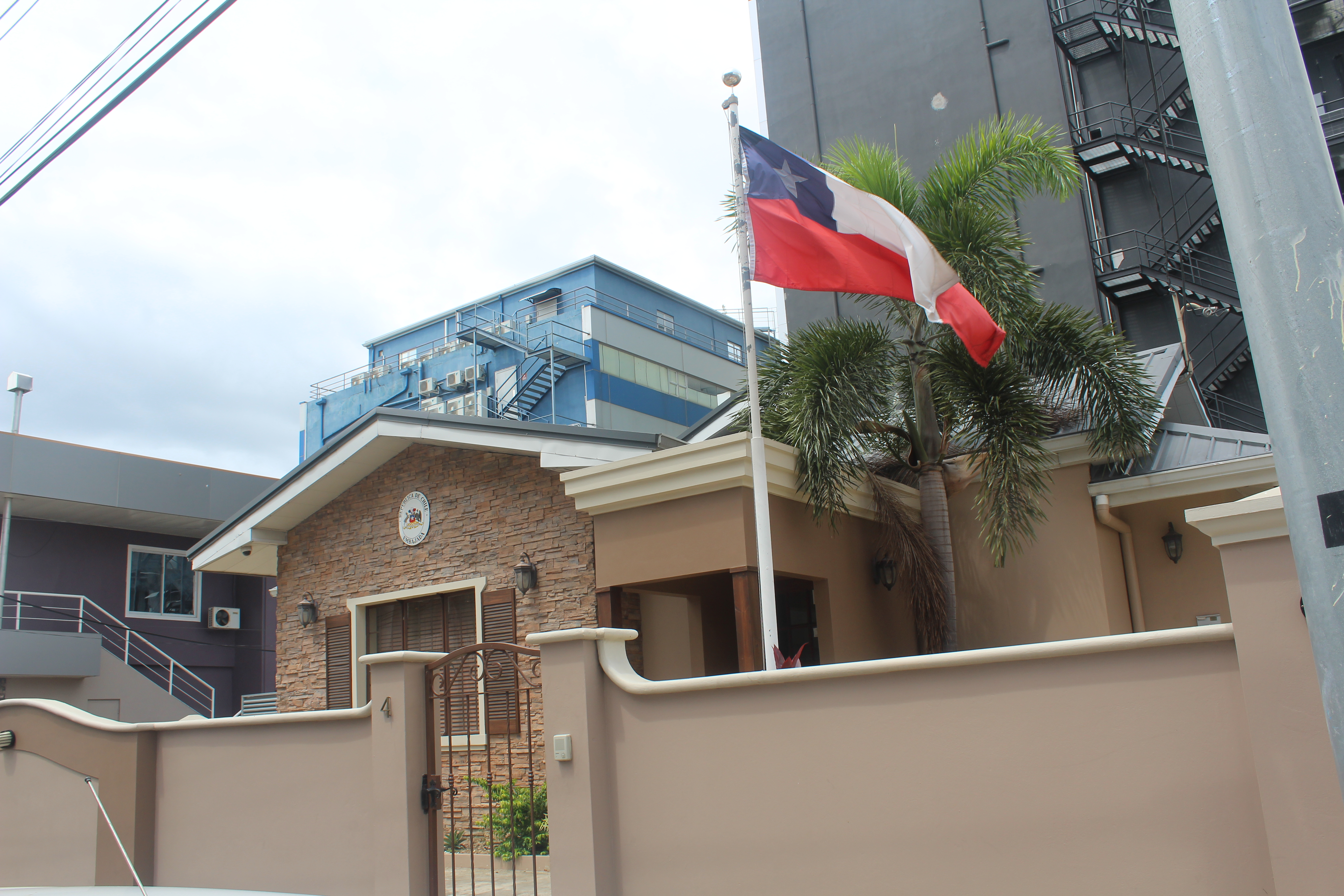
Embassy of Chile in Port of Spain

Trinidad and Tobago and Chile have had historically little ties but have strengthened relations in the past decade. In the 1980s, the two nations voted together on abstaining from recognizing Argentinian sovereignty over the Falkland Islands. In 2017, Prime Minister Keith Rowley and Chilean President Michelle Bachelet signed a MOU on intellectual property to solidify copyright laws and intellectual property rights in the two nations. Trinidad and Tobago took a keen interest in furthering trade relations between the nations and working together on building T&T's education and solar energy infrastructure. Trinidadian Minister of Trade and Industry Paula Gopee-Scoon met Chilean Ambassador to Trinidad and Tobago, Aníbal Barría Garcua, to discuss the possibility of a Partial Scope Trade Agreement between the nations. In 2018, Barria exclaimed of the great cultural ties and expressed strengthening ties with T&T to promote tourism and to import cultural ties from Trinidad such as Soca and Calypso music and Carnival Festivals.

== Economic relations ==
Chile aims to diversify imports from Trinidad and Tobago to become a larger trading partner. In 2018, the Chilean embassy claimed to have had a trade totaling over US$6 Billion with Trinidad.

Trinidad and Tobago exported US$733 Million worth of goods to Chile in 2017. The vast majority of the exports were refined petroleum and Natural Gas. US$19.2 Million worth of goods were exported to Trinidad and Tobago in 2017.

== See also ==
- Foreign relations of Chile
- Foreign relations of Trinidad and Tobago
