= Jamaica–Trinidad and Tobago relations =

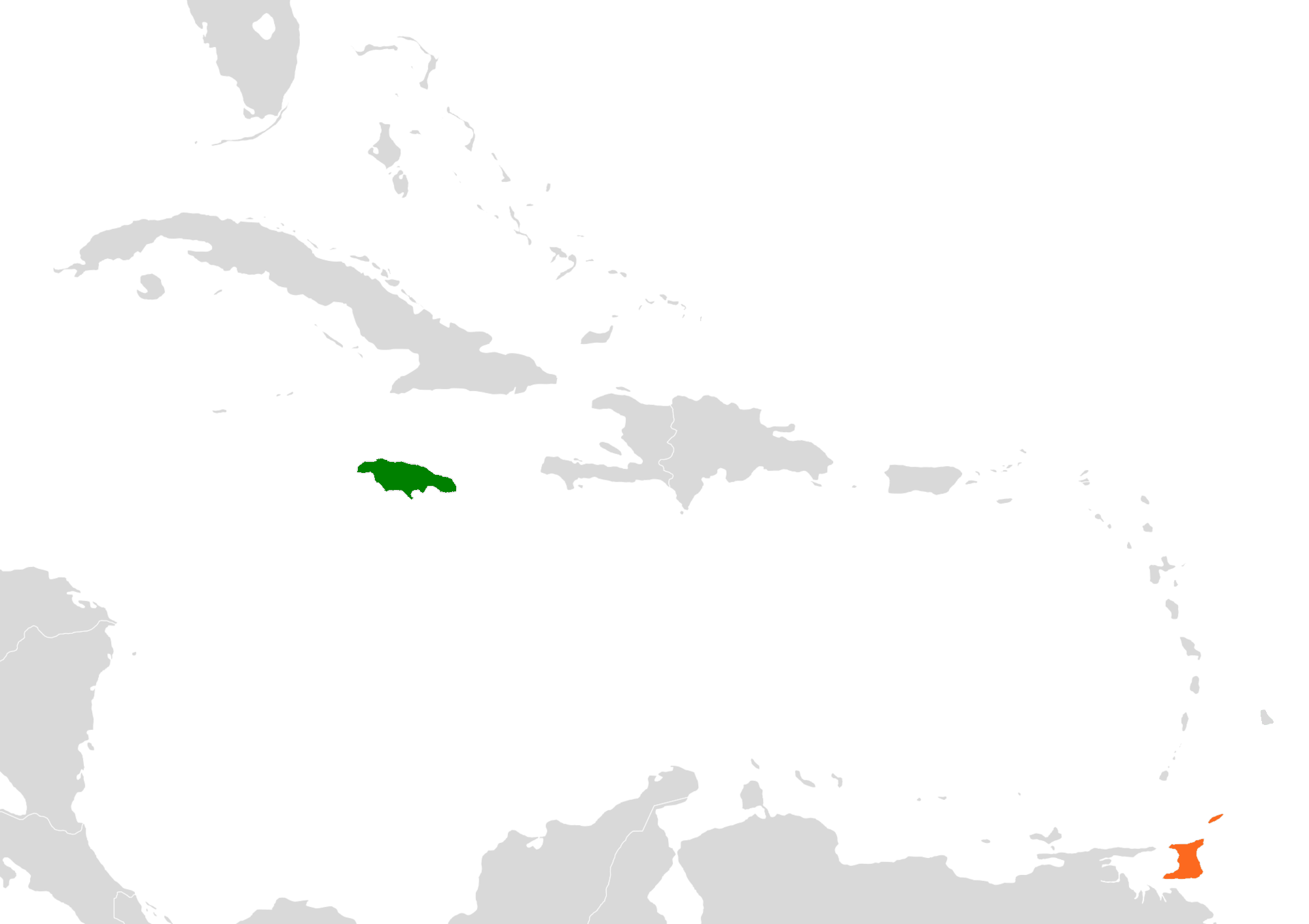

- Jamaica: Trinidad and Tobago

Jamaica–Trinidad and Tobago relations are bilateral relations between Jamaica and the Trinidad and Tobago. Trinidad and Tobago has a high commission in Kingston and Jamaica has a high commission in Port of Spain. Both countries are members of CARICOM, Commonwealth of Nations and Community of Latin American and Caribbean States.

== History ==
In August 1962, both countries declared independence from Great Britain.

== Economic relations ==
In May 2012, the Jamaica/Trinidad and Tobago Trade Facilitation Desk was established to encourage a balance of trade between T&T and Jamaica, as well as in an effort to increase intra-regional trade. Its main objective is to approach pragmatically the trade issues affecting the relationship between T&T and Jamaica, through the offering of support services to aggrieved parties and finding solutions at the ground level. It was also implemented to tackle existing and future Technical Barriers to Trade (TBT), in order to improve and facilitate market access and promote a free and fair trading environment. The creation of the Jamaica-T&T Trade Facilitation Desk was driven by the foresight of the Bermudez Group Ltd (BGL), which has also been pivotal in providing the financial support for the project since its inception.

Mrs. Pichi-Ayers is a French native of Guadeloupe, with considerable training and experience in business development, marketing strategy, trade facilitation and cooperation matters. Mrs. Pichi-Ayers has served various institutions committed to the growth of the private sector through export promotion.

== Sports ==
Both countries are part of the multi-national West Indies cricket team, with several players from both countries representing the board.

== See also ==
- Foreign relations of Jamaica
- Foreign relations of Trinidad and Tobago
