= Singapore–Trinidad and Tobago relations =

Singapore-Trinidadian relations
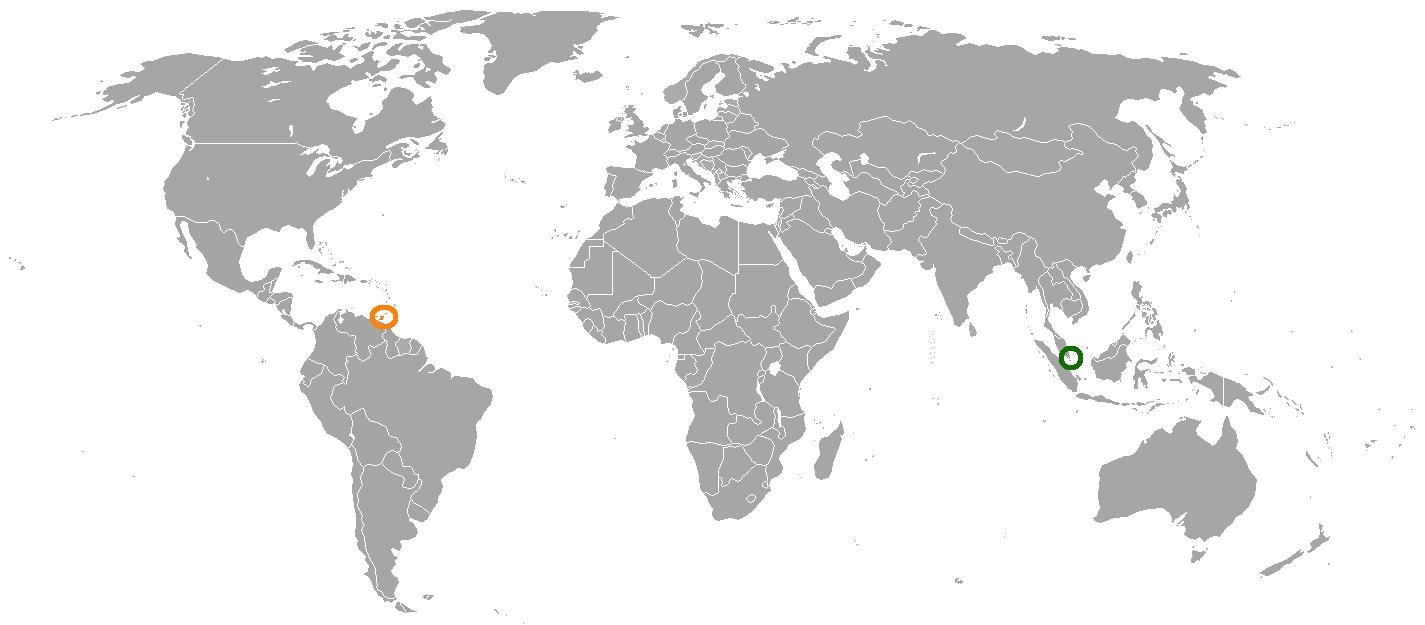

- Singapore: Trinidad and Tobago

Singapore–Trinidad and Tobago relations are bilateral relations between Singapore and Trinidad and Tobago. Trinidad and Tobago has a High Commission in New Delhi which deals with all diplomatic relations with Singapore

Both Singapore and Trinidad and Tobago are republics in the Commonwealth of Nations.

== History ==
In 1971, Singapore officially established diplomatic relations with Trinidad and Tobago, the first country within CARICOM that it established relations with.

== Trade ==
Singapore was Trinidad and Tobago's 3rd largest import partner in 2015, making up 4.6% of all imports totaling US$269 Million. 99% of all exports from T&T to Singapore were refined oil, while exports to Trinidad were more varied, ranging from rolled tobacco to passenger ships.

== See also ==
- Foreign relations of Singapore
- Foreign relations of Trinidad and Tobago
