= Russia–Trinidad and Tobago relations =

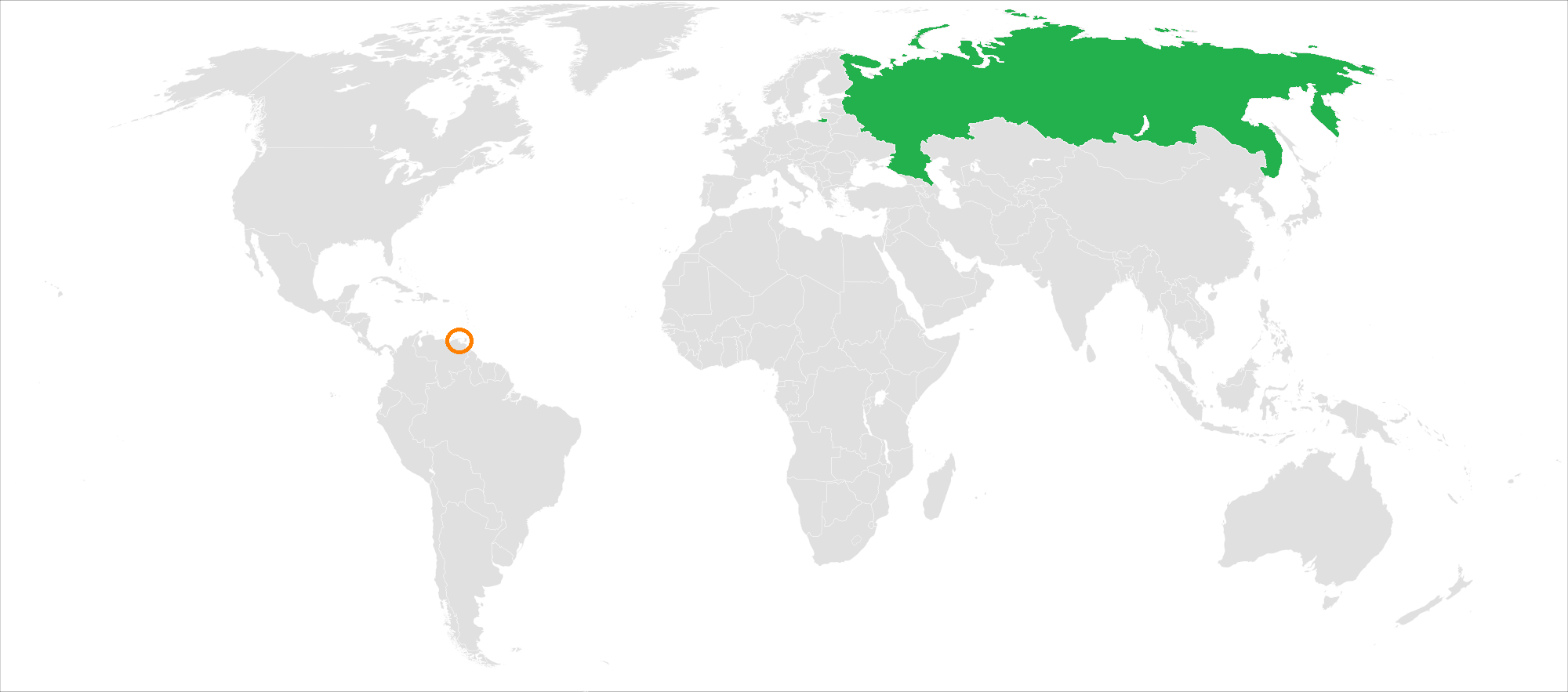

- Russia: Trinidad and Tobago

Diplomatic relations between the Soviet Union and Trinidad and Tobago were established on June 6, 1974. Russia is represented in Trinidad and Tobago through a non-resident embassy in Georgetown, Guyana.

== Soviet-era relations ==
Premier of the Soviet Union Nikita Khrushchev sent a telegram to Eric Williams, the incoming Prime Minister of Trinidad and Tobago, on 30 August 1962 recognising the independence of Trinidad and Tobago from the United Kingdom. In the same telegram, which was sent only hours before the formal independence from the United Kingdom, the Soviet Premier also expressed his willingness to establish diplomatic relations with the new Caribbean nation.

Diplomatic relations between the Soviet Union and Trinidad and Tobago were established on 6 June 1974 in New York City, when the Permanent Representative of the Soviet Union to the United Nations Yakov Malik and his Trinidadian counterpart signed the necessary treaty. Vladimir Kazimirov was appointed as the first Soviet Ambassador to Trinidad and Tobago, in concurrence with his posting as Ambassador to Venezuela, on 19 April 1975. Kazimirov presented his Letters of Credence to Governor-General of Trinidad and Tobago Ellis Clarke on 13 June 1975.

In 1975, Eric Williams travelled to the Soviet Union as part of a thawing of relations between his country and Soviet-aligned states.

== Russia and Trinidad ==
In August 1992, Trinidad and Tobago recognized Russia as the successor state to the Soviet Union. In 2004, Sergey Lavrov and Knowlson Gift signed a protocol on political consultations between the two ministries. In April 2005, the Chamber of Commerce and Industry of the Russian Federation and the Chamber of Industry and Commerce of the Republic of Trinidad and Tobago signed a cooperation agreement. In 2004, the Russian Cossack folk dance had nine concerts in Port of Spain, San Fernando, Couva, and Tobago.

In December 2010, Suruj Rambachan, the Trinidad and Tobago Foreign Minister announced that the country had lifted visa requirements for holders of Russian passports one month before. Rambachan stated that the move, under which holders of those passports would be able to visit Trinidad and Tobago for 90 days visa-free for either business or pleasure, was done to make it easier for those nationals to do business in the country, and also to increase tourism, in which he noted that Russian tourism to Tobago has been increasing.

== See also ==
- List of ambassadors of Russia to Trinidad and Tobago
- Foreign relations of Russia
- Foreign relations of Trinidad and Tobago
