= Trinidad and Tobago–United States relations =

- Trinidad and Tobago: United States

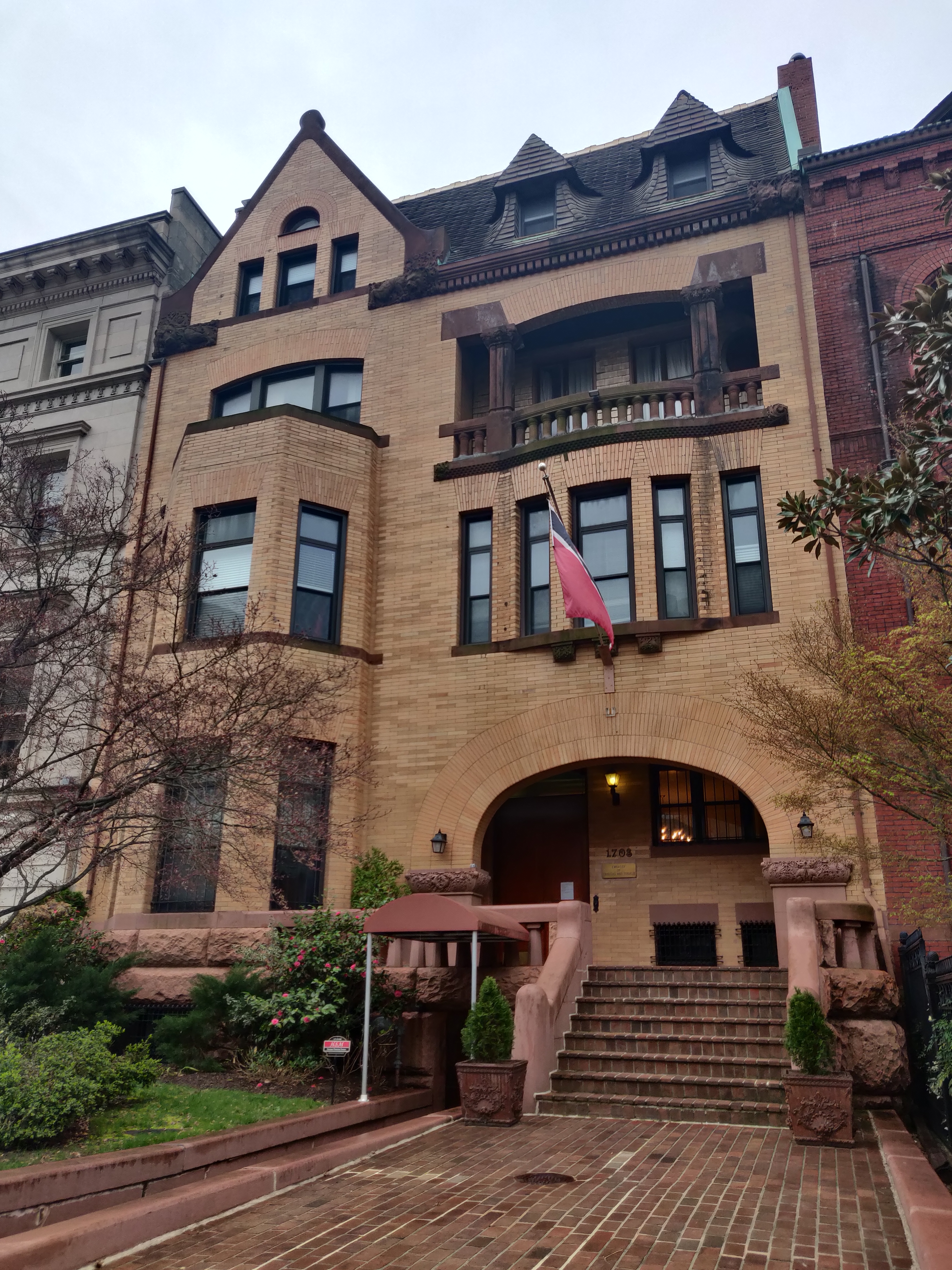
Embassy of Trinidad and Tobago in Washington, D.C.

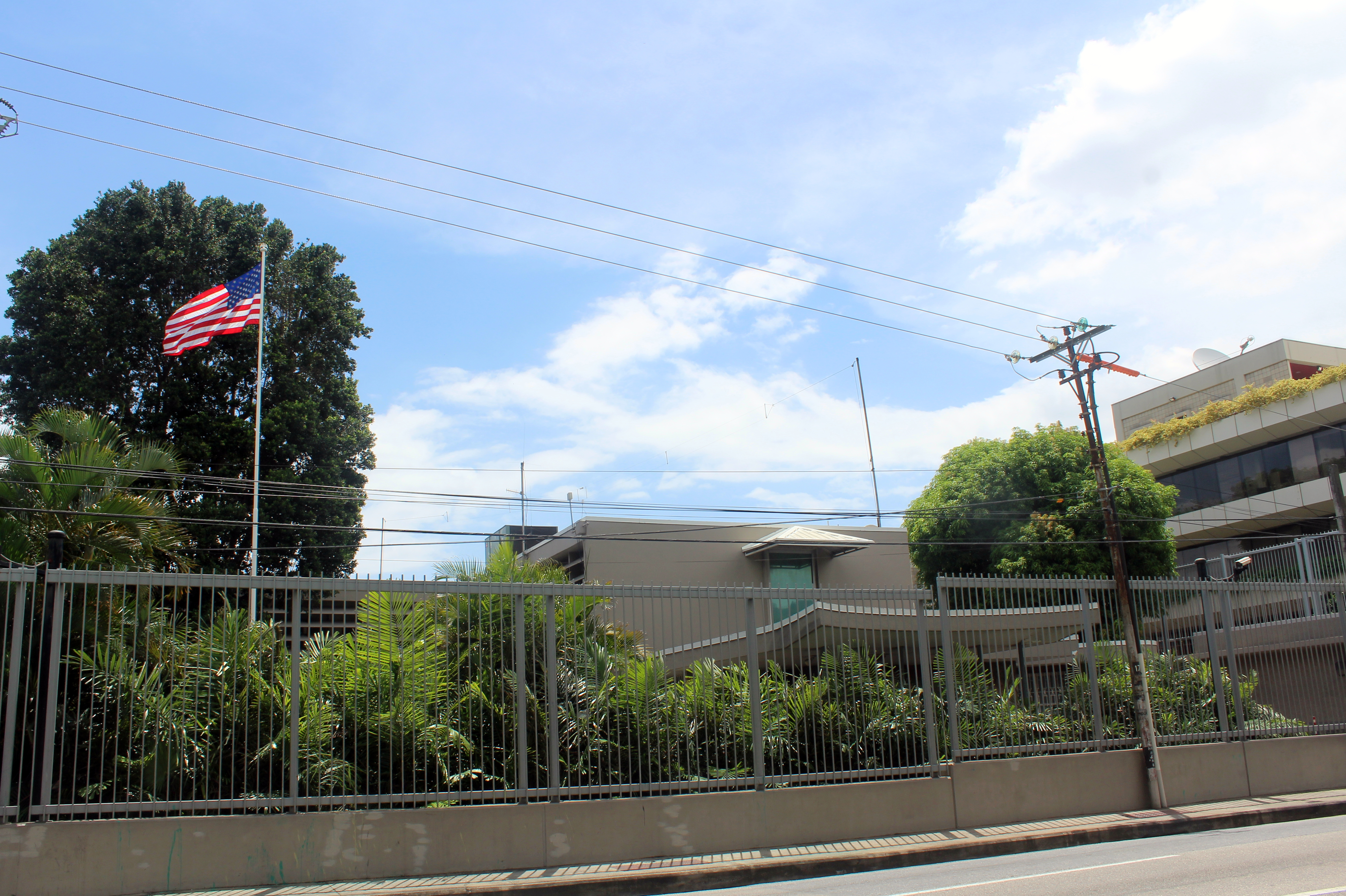
Embassy of the United States in Port of Spain

Trinidad and Tobago–United States relations are bilateral relations between Trinidad and Tobago and the United States.

The United States and Trinidad and Tobago enjoy cordial relations. U.S. interests here and throughout the hemisphere focus on increasing investment and trade, and ensuring more stable supplies of energy. They also include enhancing Trinidad and Tobago's political and social stability and positive regional role through assistance in drug interdiction, health issues, and legal affairs. The U.S. embassy was established in Port of Spain in 1962, replacing the former consulate general.

== Background ==
International Military Education and Training (IMET) and Foreign Military Financing (FMF) programs were suspended in 2003 under the terms of the American Service-Members' Protection Act (ASPA), because Trinidad and Tobago, a member of the International Criminal Court, had not concluded a bilateral non-surrender or "Article 98" agreement with the United States. However, when Congress de-linked IMET funding from the Article 98 sanctions, a nominal allocation of $45,000 in IMET was reinstated for late 2007. Currently, the main source of financial assistance provided to the defense force is through the State Department's Bureau of International Narcotics and Law Enforcement funds, Traditional Commander's Activities funds, the State Partnership Program (with Delaware), and IMET. Assistance to Trinidad and Tobago from the U.S. military, law enforcement authorities, and in the area of health issues remains important to the bilateral relationship and to accomplishing U.S. policy objectives.

The U.S. Government also provides technical assistance to the Government of Trinidad and Tobago through a number of existing agreements. The Department of Homeland Security has a Customs Advisory Team working with the Ministry of Finance to update its procedures. Similarly, the Treasury Department had an Internal Revenue Service (IRS) advising team that worked with the Board of Inland Revenue modernizing its tax administration; this long-running project ended in October 2007. The U.S. Centers for Disease Control and Prevention (CDC), a part of the Department of Health and Human Services, collaborates with the Trinidad-based Caribbean Epidemiology Center (CAREC) and other regional partners to provide technical assistance and financial support for HIV/AIDS-related epidemiological surveillance and public health training in the region.

U.S. commercial ties with Trinidad and Tobago have always been strong and have grown substantially in the last several years due to economic liberalization. U.S. firms have invested more than a billion dollars in recent years—mostly in the petrochemical, oil/gas, and iron/steel sectors. Many of America's largest corporations have commercial links with Trinidad and Tobago, and more than 30 U.S. firms have offices and operations in the country. Trinidad and Tobago is a beneficiary of the U.S. Caribbean Basin Initiative (CBI). The U.S. embassy actively fosters bilateral business ties and provides a number of commercial services to potential investors and traders. A double-taxation agreement has existed since the early 1970s. A tax information exchange agreement was signed in 1989, and a Bilateral Investment Treaty (BIT) and an Intellectual Property Rights agreement were signed in 1994. The BIT entered into force in 1996. Other agreements include Extradition and Mutual Legal Assistance treaties, which have been in force since 1999. An agreement on Maritime Cooperation was signed in 1996.

There are large numbers of U.S. citizens and permanent residents of Trinidadian origin living in the United States (mostly in New York and Florida), which keeps cultural ties strong. About 20,000 U.S. citizens visit Trinidad and Tobago on vacation or for business every year, and more than 4,600 American citizens are residents.

Principal U.S. Embassy Officials include:

- Ambassador — Candace A. Bond
- Deputy Chief of Mission — Jenifer Neidhart de Ortiz

== Diplomatic missions ==
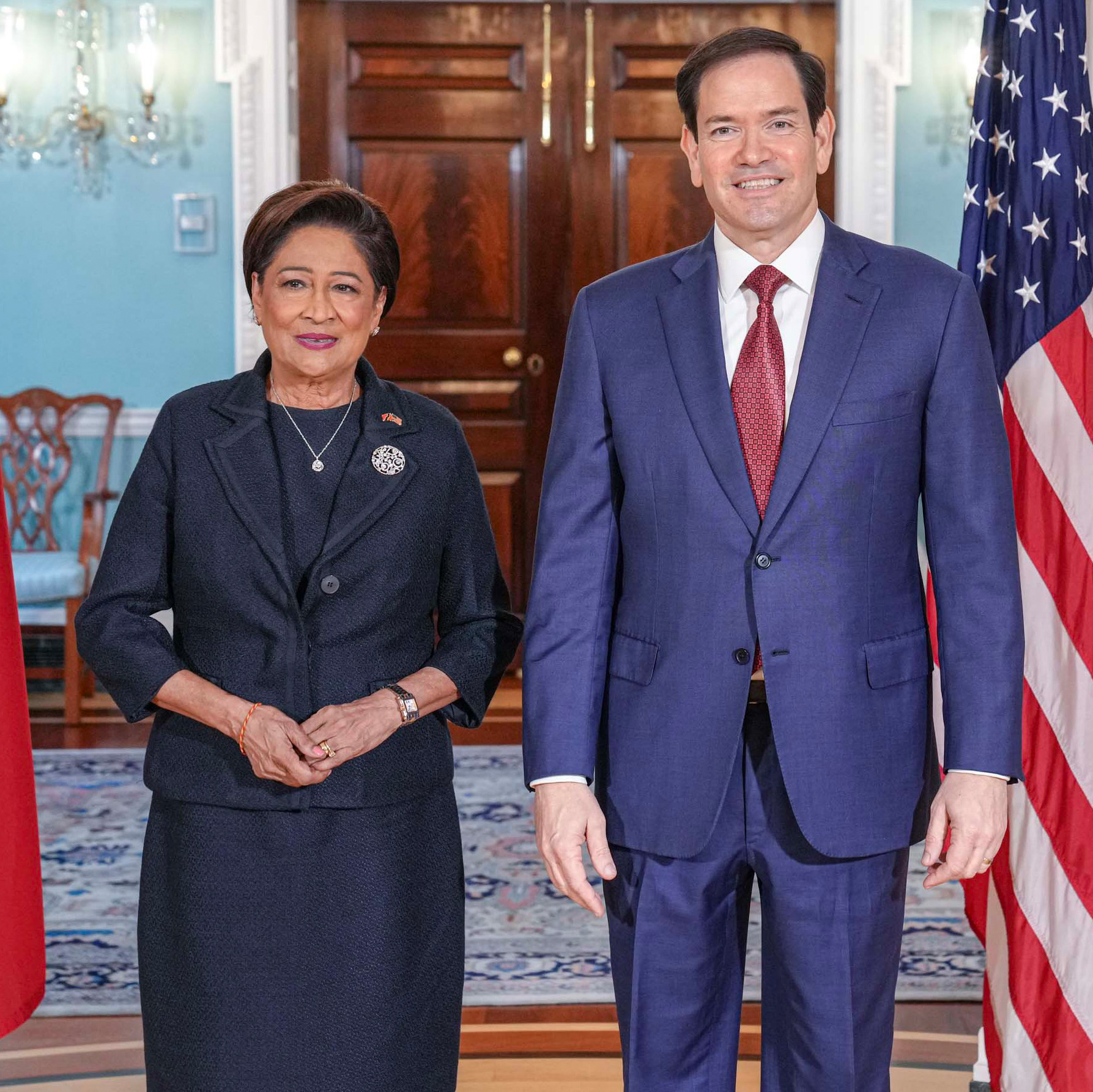
Secretary of State Marco Rubio meets Trinidad and Tobago Prime Minister Kamla Persad-Bissessar at the Department of State in Washington, D.C. on September 30, 2025

The U.S. Embassy for the Republic of Trinidad and Tobago is located in the capital city Port of Spain, on the main island of Trinidad.

== COVID-19 Vaccines ==
In June 2021, the US embassy to Trinidad and Tobago was mocked after it had donated 80 vials of COVID-19 vaccines to a country with a population of 1.4 million.

== See also ==
- Caribbean Basin Initiative (CBI)
- Caribbean Basin Trade Partnership Act
- Caribbean Community
- Foreign relations of the United States
- Foreign relations of Trinidad and Tobago
- Free Trade Area of the Americas
- North American Free Trade Agreement
- North American Union
- Third Border Initiative
- Western Hemisphere Travel Initiative
