= Trinidad and Tobago–Venezuela relations =

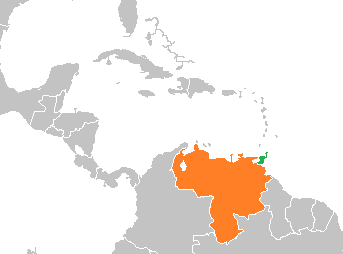

- Trinidad and Tobago: Venezuela

Trinidad and Tobago–Venezuela relations refers to the bilateral relations between Trinidad and Tobago and Venezuela. Trinidad and Tobago has an embassy in Caracas and Venezuela has an embassy in Port of Spain. Both countries are members of the Association of Caribbean States.

== History ==
Both Trinidad and Tobago islands were originally settled by Indigenous people who came from the Orinoco basin. Trinidad was first settled by pre-agricultural Archaic people at least 7,000 years ago, making it the earliest settled part of the Caribbean. Banwari Trace in south-west Trinidad is the oldest attested archaeological site in the Caribbean, dating to about 5000 BC. At this time, Trinidad was still part of mainland actual Venezuela. Archaeological research of the site has also shed light on the patterns of migration of Archaic (pre-ceramic) peoples from mainland South America to the Lesser Antilles via Trinidad between 5000 and 2000 BCE. Several waves of migration occurred over the following centuries, which can be identified by differences in their archaeological remains. At the time of European contact after the third voyage of Christopher Columbus in 1498, Trinidad was occupied by various Arawakan speaking groups including the Nepoya and Suppoya, and Cariban-speaking groups such as the Yao, while Tobago was occupied by the Island Caribs and Galibi.

Under Spanish rule, many Trinidad Amerindians died from new diseases introduced by the Spanish settlers and others were enslaved to harvest pearls at Margarita and Cubagua islands. The native population over time intermingled with them, leading to the emergence of the Mestizo identity. The term "Mulatto" originated when Europeans began transporting enslaved Africans to Trinidad and mixing with them in 1517, via the Atlantic slave trade.

In 1520 the governorship of Trinidad was granted to Rodrigo de Bastidas, but this was opposed by Diego Columbus, and Bastidas waived the grant. In 1530 the king of Spain handed it over to Antonio Sedeño who was its first governor until 1535 when he abandoned it due to ongoing litigation over jurisdiction with the Province of Cumaná. Its first capital was San José de Oruña, founded by Antonio de Berrio in 1592 was destroyed by the English pirate Walter Raleigh.

In 1596, Trinidad was annexed to the Guayana Province under the government of Antonio de Berrío, who had governed the island since 1591. To encourage the development of the lands the cocoa plantation economy was started in Trinidad. under Encomienda sistem. The province was overseen by the president of the Royal Audience of Santo Domingo, which served as its court of appeal, until 1739 when it was transferred over to the Viceroyalty of New Granada and the Royal Audience of Santa Fe.

In 1687, Catalan Capuchin friars established missions in eastern Venezuela, including in New Andalusia, Guayana, and Trinidad. The primary crops were cocoa and tobacco, which were sold in Cumaná or on Margarita Island. Despite generally peaceful coexistence, abuses committed by the missionaries sparked the Arenal Revolt (1699), which was violently suppressed. Only those missions located closest to San José de Oruña endured, given the dangers posed by attacks from Caribs and Guaraúnos, pirates, and nations hostile to Spain.

By 1720, most of the cacao plants died. Rumor has it there was a natural devastation of the existing Criollo trees on the island and so Forastero trees were planted. After cross-pollination with the few remaining Criollo trees, the Trinitario variety was born. Trinitario was known as "the world’s finest cocoa hybrid" bringing together the best of both worlds. However, throughout the 1700s, the Trinidadian cocoa plantations took huge hits which led to a near extinction of cocoa production on the island.

By 1772, the Spanish capital of San José de Oruña had a population of 326 Spaniards and 417 Amerindians. Yet the houses consisted of mud huts with thatch roofs. In general, lacking gold, the island was poor and undeveloped, inducing many to leave.

The government of Trinidad was integrated as part of Captaincy General of Venezuela created by Charles III of Spain in 1777 under the principles of the Bourbons Reforms. In 1783, the Spanish Cedula of Population encouraged the migration of Catholic persons to Trinidad province and gave many incentives to lure settlers including exemption from taxes for ten years and land grants per the terms set out in the Cedula. The governor José María Chacón founded the city of San Fernando in 1784. He compelled the province's Cabildo (governing council) of San José de Oruña to move to Port of Spain and he limited its powers to the municipality. The settlement of French Catholics on the island led to a rapid increase in the town's population and its geographical extension westwards. French planters of sugar cane with their slaves, free persons of color, and mulattos from neighboring islands of Grenada, Martinique, Guadeloupe, and Dominica migrated to Trinidad during the French Revolution. These new immigrants establishing local communities of Blanchisseuse, Champs Fleurs, Cascade, Carenage, Lopinot and Laventille. Trinidad's population jumped from just under 1,400 in 1777 to over 15,000 by the end of 1789.

In 18 February 1797 the governor Chacón surrendered Trinidad to a Royal Navy fleet under the command of Sir Ralph Abercromby. Sir Thomas Picton was the first governor of Trinidad as a British crown colony, with a French-speaking population of Catholic faith and Spanish laws.

After the Island fell under British control Spanish-speaking Venezuelans continued to settle in Trinidad, usually in connection with the civil wars and revolutions which followed the Venezuelan War of Independence.. The conspiracy of Manuel Gual and Jose Maria España was reported on 13 July 1797 to Captain General Pedro Carbonell, who ordered a persecution against the conspirators, in which 49 Creoles and 21 Spaniards were arrested. Both Gual and España escaped to the Antilles and in 1798 arrived to Trinidad. Despite the reward offered for his capture, in 1799, José María España secretly returned to Venezuela, but was arrested in La Guaira and sent to Caracas, where the Royal Court sentenced him to the death penalty on 6 May. He was tortured, hanged, beheaded and dismembered on 8 May in the Plaza Mayor (current Plaza Bolívar).

Manuel Gual remained in Trinidad, from where he maintained communication with the precursor Francisco de Miranda who was in London. On 25 October 1800 he died in San José de Oruña, Trinidad, possibly poisoned by a Spanish spy named Valecillos.

During the negotiations leading to the Peace of Amiens of 1802, many of the British inhabitants petitioned against the return of the island to Spain; this together with Picton's and Abercromby's representations, ensured the retention of Trinidad as a British possession. By then, reports of arbitrariness and brutality associated with Picton governorship had led to a demand at home for his removal.

Under the 1802 Treaty of Amiens, Spain formally ceded the island of Trinidad to Great Britain. In 1806, the general Francisco de Miranda launched from Port od Spain an unsuccessful expedition to liberate Venezuela with volunteers from the United States and the aid of Royal Navy. In Port of Spain Miranda was hosted by the governor Thomas Hyslop until 1807 when returned to England.

In 1808, Port-of-Spain was destroyed by fire. At that time, it was a sprawling town of wood and shingle that had grown tremendously during the previous twenty-five years. As a result of this disaster the Government brought in legislation regarding building regulations, and the new government buildings were built of brick.

The rise of cocoa cultivation in Trinidad was largely achieved through the importation of Venezuelan peasant farmers fueled after the Slavery Abolition Act 1833 which abolished slavery in the British Empire by way of compensated emancipation. These farmers were employed to clear the forest and establish cocoa seedlings. After five to seven years, they were paid for each mature cocoa tree on the plot of land. Then, they moved on to a new plot of land, repeating this process. Families of Venezuelan born African and Amerindian descent are recorded in Trinidad as far back as 1841 within the Cocoa Estates Community. These migrants were part of the Cedula of Populations, and included workers attracted from Venezuela after the 1838 Abolition of Slavery, for labor within the cocoa industry. Migrants from Venezuela settled and intermarried, in particular in Diego Martin with Africans of Sierra Leonese descent, and with that community formed an integral part of the Estate Lands settlers in that Region. Among the larger families of their descendants, today are the Emmanuel, Herrera, Tardieu, George, Felix, Lara, Bermudez, Hospedales and Thomas families of Maraval, Paramin and Diego Martin. They became an integral part of the Cocoa Farms Estate owners and settled many of the lands and regions in Maraval, Paramin, St. Ann's, and Diego Martin. The name 'cocoa panyol' applicated to Venezuelan migrants and comes from the patois word for Spanish, espagnol, and the Spanish word español, and reflects the historical association between the group and the cultivation of cacao in Trinidad.

In 1859 the United Kingdom began a claim on the Patos island that Venezuela rejected arguing that it was not mentioned in the capitulation of 1777 nor in the Treaty of Amiens of 1802.

Since the middle of the 19th century, thousands of citizens of Trinidad and Tobago, as well as other inhabitants of the small islands of the Antilles, began to emigrate to Venezuela due to great economic prosperity that enjoyed at that time due the El Callao gold rush and by oil boom. They initially settled in cities in the Guyanese region and then expanded to other parts of Venezuela. Due to the great irregularity and illegality of the majority of Trinidadians residing in Venezuela, it was difficult to census or estimate their population.

The people of Trinidad were primarily known as English teachers, stevedores in harbors, watchmen, oil workers, artisanal miners (pork-knockers), musicians, ice cream sellers on the Venezuelans streets. Appointed as Consul General of Venezuela in Trinidad, Luis Level de Goda died in 1899 while in office of Port of Spain.

After Trinidad became a British colony in 1797 from Spain, the islands in the Gulf of Paria remained as disputed territories between Venezuela and British Trinidad and Tobago. In 1902 the United Kingdom raised its flag on the Patos island which provoked a strong protest from the Venezuelan government. In 1904 Venezuela included it as part of the Federal territory Colón. Negotiations for settling the border dispute and defining the maritime boundary between the two countries began in 1939 and were led by geologist Hans Kugler. Negotiations were influenced by considerations for placing anti-submarine devices between Venezuela and T&T territory as World War II was underway. As part of the negotiated agreement, Venezuela would cede Soldado Rock to T&T for Patos Island in the Dragon's Mouth, located 4 km east of the Venezuelan mainland. The agreements were formalized on February 26, 1942, in Caracas.

On 27 November 1961, the General Assembly of United Nations by Resolution 1654 (XVI), created a Special Committee of 17 member states (include Venezuela) to examine the application of the Declaration on the granting of independence to colonial countries and to make recommendations on how to better implement it

Trinidad and Tobago gained its independence from the United Kingdom on 31 August 1962. However, Elizabeth II remained head of state, represented locally by Governor-General Solomon Hochoy. Only two weeks after both countries established diplomatic relations on 16 September, 1962. Venezuela was the first Latin American nation to formally diplomatic relations with an English speaking Caribbean Nation. Venezuela and Trinidad and Tobago enjoy a cordial and active relation.

In 1970, after the expiration of the Mixed Commission established according to the Geneva Agreement, Presidents Rafael Caldera and Forbes Burnham signed the Port of Spain Protocol, which declared a 12-year moratorium on Venezuela's reclamation of Guayana Esequiba, with the purpose of allowing both governments to promote cooperation and understanding while the border claim was in abeyance. The protocol was formally signed in Port of Spain by the Minister of Foreign Affairs of Venezuela Aristides Calvani, Guyana State Minister for Foreign Affairs Shridath Ramphal and British High Commissioner to Trinidad and Tobago Roland Hunte.

President Jaime Lusinchi of Venezuela became the first president of Venezuela to visit Trinidad and Tobago in 1986, despite both nations neighboring each other. An agreement was signed on technical, manufacturing, and fishing rights during his visit. Several Trinidadian Coast Guard members were taught Spanish to deal with future situations with Venezuelans. Despite signing fishing agreements, there were several Trinidadian ships seized by Venezuelans following the visit.

Due to the country's proximity to the coast of Venezuela, in 2004, the government appointed Spanish as the first foreign language, launched in March 2005. Currently, an estimated 5% of the country's inhabitants speak Spanish.

In recent years, Trinidad and Tobago has witnessed increased immigration from Venezuela, with an estimated 40,000 Venezuelans immigrating to the country by 2018. Relations have remained strained in recent years due to the pressure the large influx of Venezuelans places on healthcare and public services in the island nation. 16,500 Venezuelan refugees were granted temporary work visas and photo IDs for 6 months to a year.

== Trade ==
CARICOM-Venezuela agreement on trade and investment eliminates tariffs on certain goods between Trinidad and other Caribbean nations and Venezuela. This includes duty-free access on specific products and elimination of tariffs for certain exports to Venezuela.

== See also ==
- Foreign relations of Venezuela
- Foreign relations of Trinidad and Tobago
- Cocoa payols
- Parang
