= Spain–Trinidad and Tobago relations =

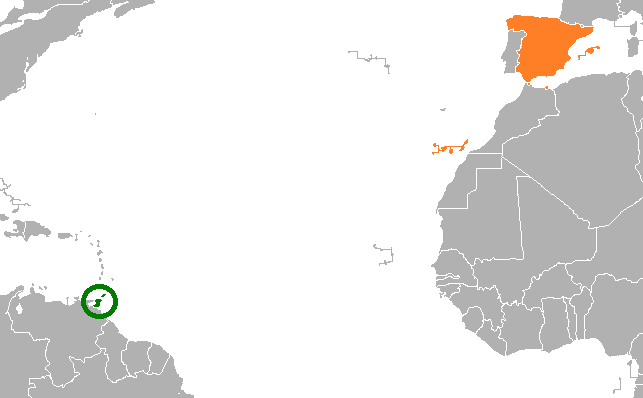

- Spain: Trinidad and Tobago

Spain–Trinidad and Tobago relations are the bilateral and diplomatic relations between these two countries. Spain has an embassy in Port of Spain, which is also accredited for Spanish consulates in other small nations of the Caribbean. Trinidad and Tobago does not have embassies or consulates in Spain.

== Diplomatic relations ==
Spain and Trinidad and Tobago established diplomatic relations in 1976, although it was necessary to wait 40 years for the opening of a Spanish Embassy residing in this country, which also covers Guiana, Suriname, Barbados, Grenada, Saint Lucia, Saint Vincent and the Grenadines, the Caribbean Community / CARICOM, to the Organization of States of the Eastern Caribbean / OECS-OECS, and the Association of Caribbean States / ACS. Trinidad and Tobago has an accredited Ambassador to Spain (resident in Brussels).

On 9 December 2013, the Minister of Foreign Affairs of the Republic of Trinidad and Tobago, Winston Dookeran, made an official visit to Madrid (first carried out by a Trinidadian Minister of Foreign Affairs ) to Spain. He met with the Minister of Foreign Affairs and Cooperation, with the Secretary of State for International Cooperation / SECIPI, as well as with the SG of Instituto Cervantes. The visit allowed to identify numerous areas of cooperation in the political, economic and commercial, educational and cultural fields.

For his part, the Minister of Foreign Affairs and Cooperation of Spain visited Trinidad and Tobago (and Guyana) on 19 and 20 May 2014 in the framework of the campaign in favor of the Spanish candidacy for a post no Permanent to the Security Council 2015–2016.

== Economic relations ==
Economic relations are reduced, practically, to the energy sector, although in this area they are important. Repsol was introduced in the country as of 1995, when large gas bags were discovered on the Trinidadian coast, and, after more than 3,100 M $ EE. UU. Investment, today 10% of the natural gas consumed by Spain comes from Trinidad and Tobago (it is the 5th largest global supplier). The presence of Repsol was greatly reduced when, in February 2013, it proceeded to sell all its Natural Gas assets in the country.

== Cooperation ==
Since it is a high-income country, Trinidad and Tobago is not a priority country for the Master Plan for Spanish Cooperation.

There is, however, a regional cooperation scheme with CARICOM (and Trinidad and Tobago, therefore, benefits from some regional actions). The cooperation with CARICOM (the Agreement was signed in July 1999) is structured around institutional mechanisms (Spain-CARICOM Meetings, Joint Cooperation Commission) and a financial mechanism (the Spain-CARICOM Joint Fund), which executes the activities identified by the Joint Committee of the Fund and endorsed by the Joint Commission. The fund currently has resources of around 1.7 million dollars, of which 600,000 are committed. The management of the regional program is carried out from the OTC of Caracas.

== See also ==
- Foreign relations of Spain
- Foreign relations of Trinidad and Tobago
