= Humberto Calderón Berti =

Venezuelan politician and diplomat

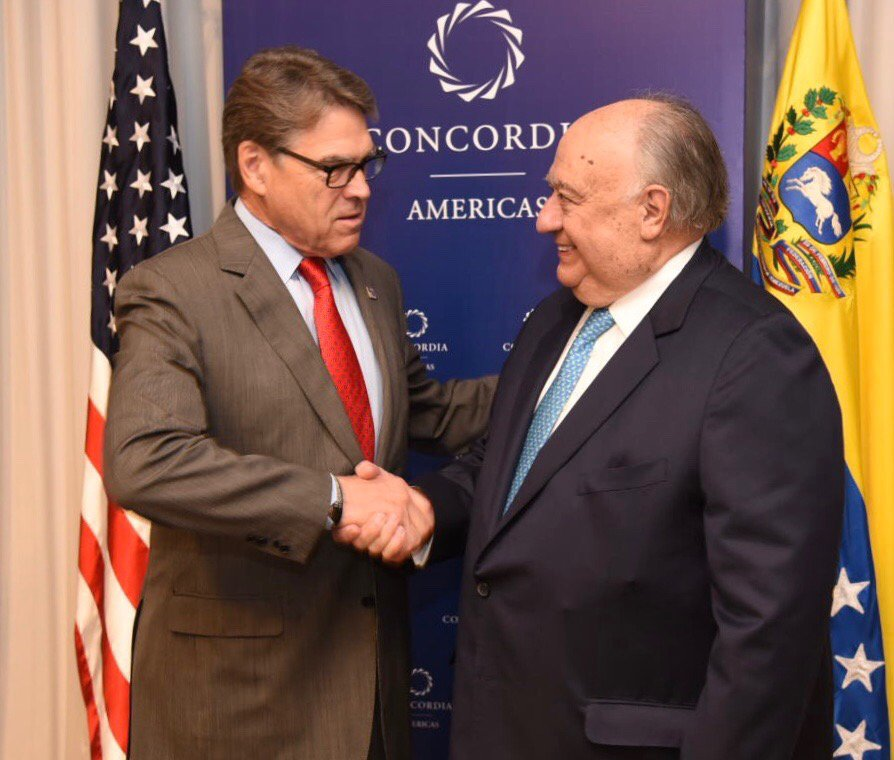
Rick Perry and Humberto Calderón Berti in Bogotá, 2019

Humberto Calderón Berti (born 21 October 1941 in Boconó, Venezuela) is a Venezuelan geologist, petroleum engineer, diplomat, politician and author, named in 2019 as ambassador to Colombia by disputed interim Venezuelan president Juan Guaidó during the 2019 Venezuelan presidential crisis, and welcomed by Carlos Holmes Trujillo, Colombia's foreign minister.

== Career ==
Calderón Berti is a former president of PDVSA (Venezuela's state-owned petroleum company), and the country's former Minister of Energy and Mines, as well as former Minister of Foreign Affairs. He is also a former OPEC president. His undergraduate degree was from the Central University of Venezuela, and he has a Master's in petroleum engineering from the University of Tulsa in Tulsa, Oklahoma.

In 2003, he and other former PDVSA petroleum executives founded the Colombian company, Vetra Energia, S.L. He solicited and was granted Spanish citizenship, where he has family and cultural ties, in 2018 because of persecution due to his membership in Venezuela's Social Christian political party (Copei).

On 26 November 2019, Guaidó dismissed Calderón as ambassador in Colombia, citing plans to change foreign policy. Venezuelan diplomat Diego Arria condemned the dismissal, calling it a "huge mistake".

Berti is a member of the Madrid Forum.

== Personal life ==
Humberto is the uncle of Coromoto Godoy, a diplomat who has served as ambassador of the governments of Hugo Chávez and Nicolás Maduro to Trinidad and Tobago, India and Spain.

== Publications ==
His publications include:

- Hacia una Política Petrolera Integral: la Responsabilidad Nacional, el Compromiso Internacional (in Spanish) (1979)
- La Coyuntura Petrolera Venezolana 1982 (in Spanish) (1982)
- Venezuela y Su Política Petrolera, 1979–1983 (in Spanish) (1986) ISBN 9802650811
- La Invasión a Kuwait (in Spanish) (1991) ISBN 9802631655
