= Brazil–Trinidad and Tobago relations =

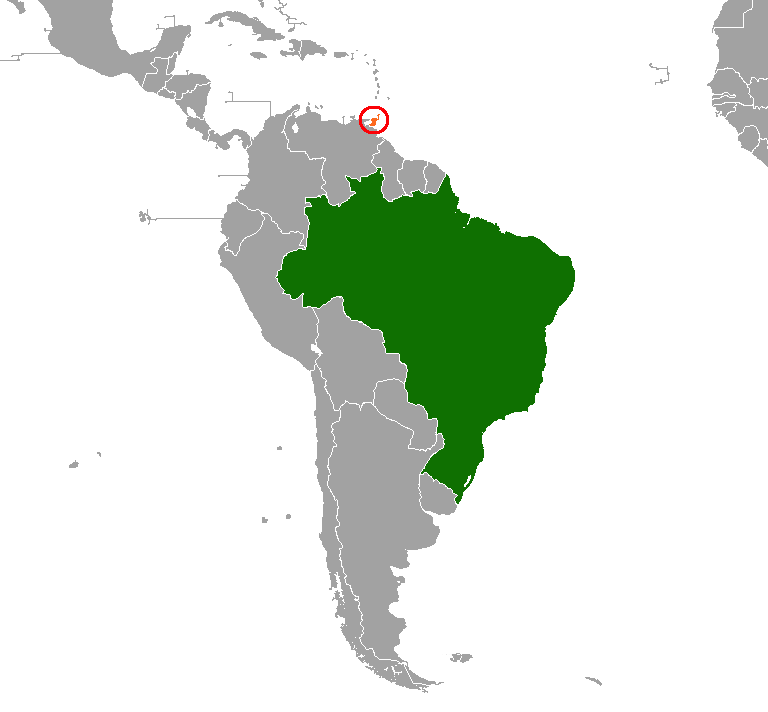

- Brazil: Trinidad and Tobago

Brazil–Trinidad and Tobago relations are bilateral relations between Brazil and Trinidad and Tobago. Trinidad and Tobago has an embassy in Brasília and Brazil has an embassy in Port of Spain.

== History ==
In 1942, a Vice Consulate was created as the first step towards Brazilian-Trinidadian relations. In 1965, The Embassy of Brazil in Port of Spain was created, establishing official relations between the two countries. In 2008, Patrick Manning visited Brasilia to sign 4 agreements including an understanding on energy. In 2009, President Luiz Inácio Lula da Silva and Foreign Minister Celso Amorim visit Trinidad and Tobago for Summit of the Americas. Trinidad and Brazil executive leaders have continued to visit each other's countries in the past decade fostering better relations.

== Trade ==
In 2017, Trinidad and Tobago imported US$205 Million worth of goods. In 2012, trade was at US$1 Billion, the main exports between the two nations being Petroleum products and oil. T&T has sent technicians to Brazil to train in food production.

== Sports ==
Several Brazilian Footballers have played for Trinidadian teams such as William Oliveira and Gefferson da Silva Goulart.

== Resident diplomatic missions ==
- Brazil has an embassy in Port of Spain.
- Trinidad and Tobago has an embassy in Brasília.
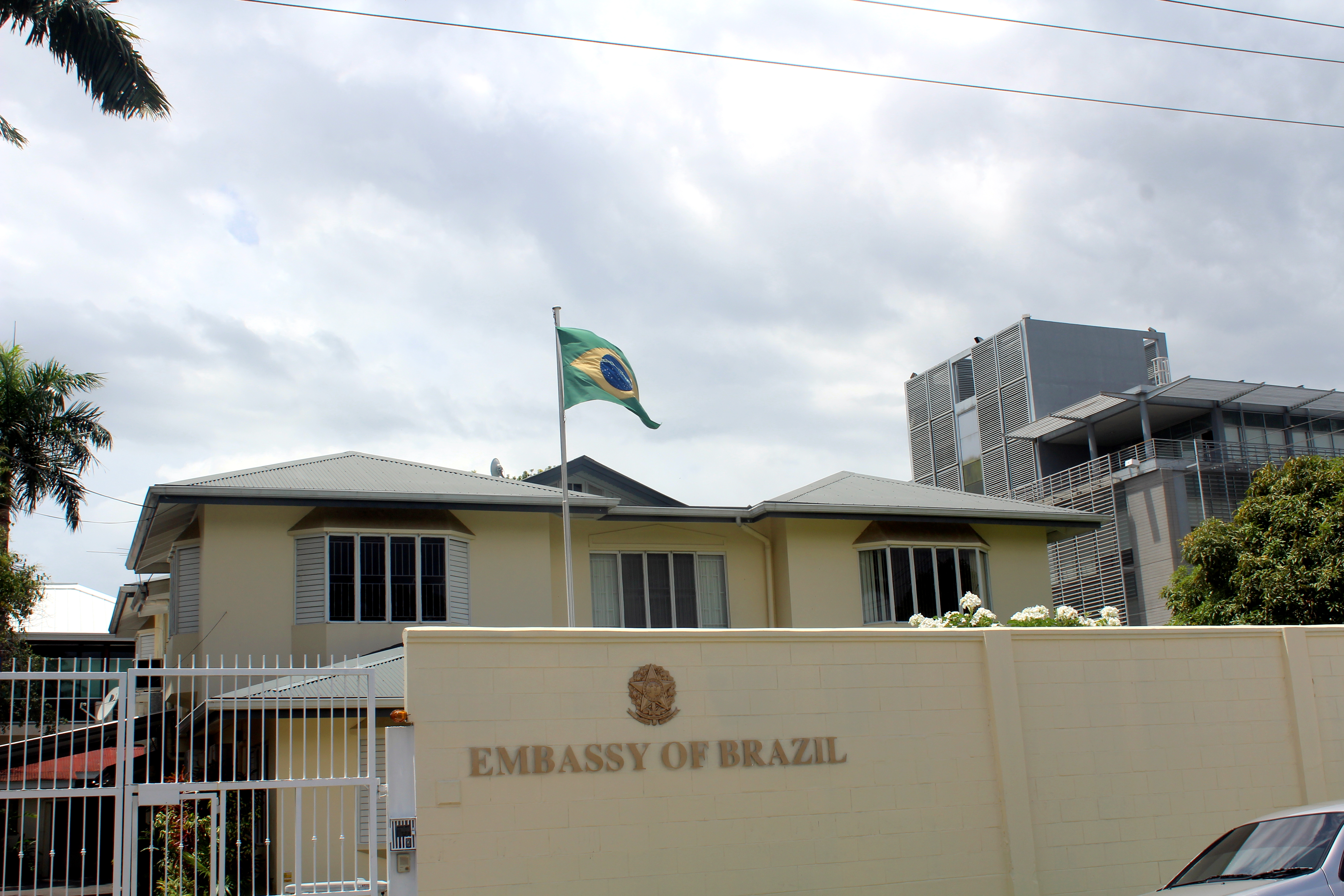
Embassy of Brazil in Port of Spain

== See also ==
- Foreign relations of Brazil
- Foreign relations of Trinidad and Tobago
- Dora Vasconcellos
- Surujrattan Rambachan
