= Cuba–Trinidad and Tobago relations =

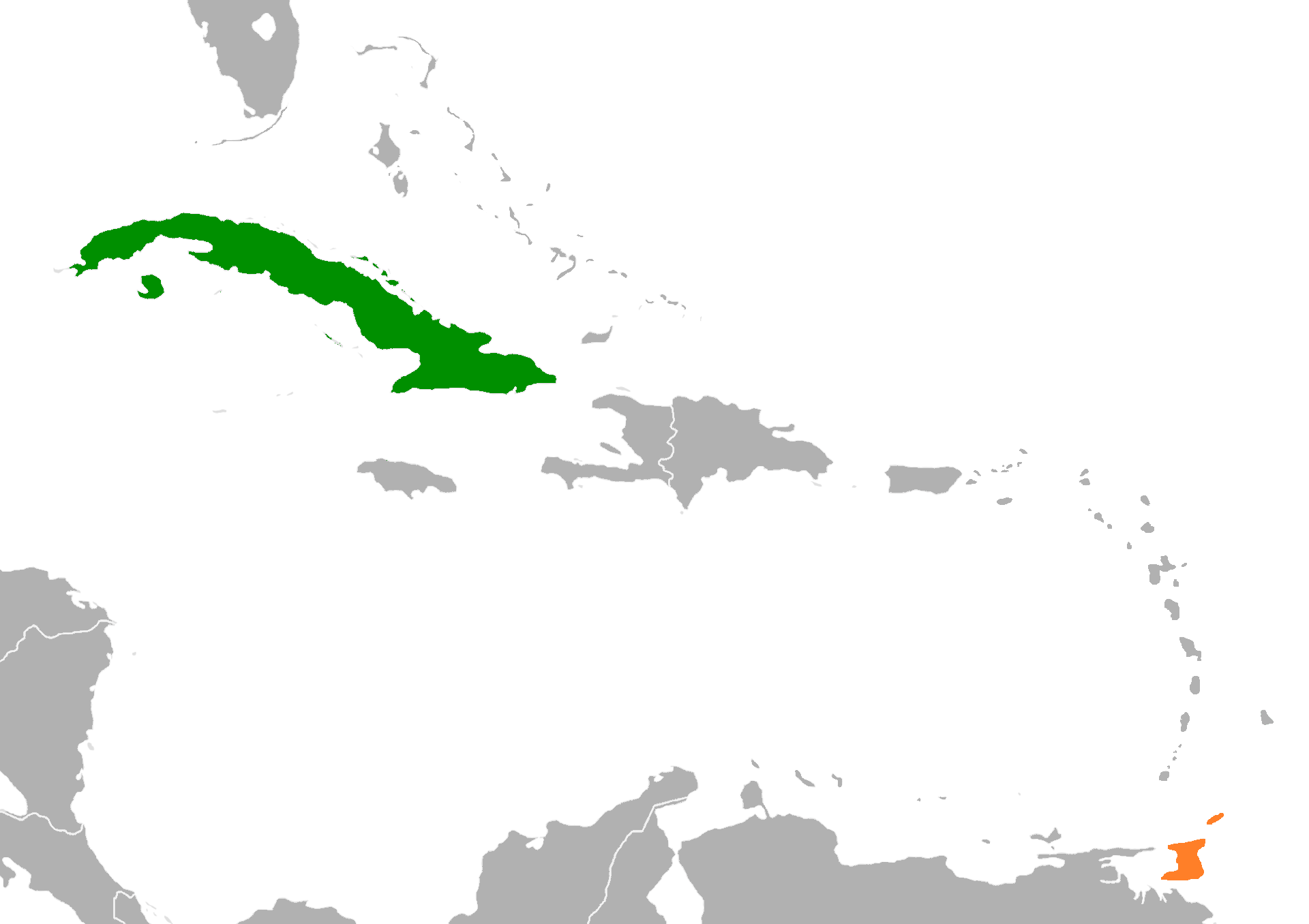

- Cuba: Trinidad and Tobago

Cuba–Trinidad and Tobago relations are bilateral relations with current relationship between Republic of Cuba and the Republic of Trinidad and Tobago. Both nations formally established diplomatic relations on the 8 December 1972.

== History ==
On the seventh to the eighth of December 2011, Trinidad and Tobago hosted the 7th CARICOM-Cuba Summit in the city of Port of Spain at the Northern National Academy for the Performing Arts (NAPA). The Cuban President, Raúl Castro arrived in Piarco International Airport, Trinidad on the 6 December 2011, at about 10:53 am and he was greeted by Trinidad and Tobago's President George Maxwell Richards, Prime Minister Kamla Persad-Bissessar and some of her government members.

== Bilateral agreements ==
Date	Agreement name	Law ref. number	Note
12 January 2000	Economic and Technical Cooperation Agreement		

== Diplomacy ==
Of Cuba

- Port of Spain (Embassy)

Of Trinidad and Tobago

- Havana (Embassy)
