= Dora Vasconcellos =

Brazilian writer and diplomat

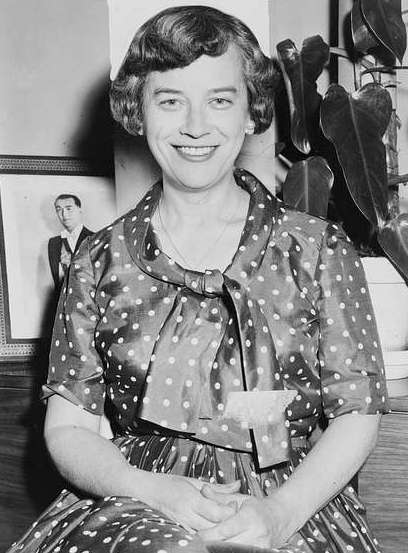
Dora Vasconellos 1957

Dora Alencar Vasconcellos (1910–1973) was a Brazilian poet and diplomat. She served as the Brazilian ambassador to Trinidad and Tobago from 1970 to her death. She was Brazil's second female diplomat to become ambassador in 1964, 9 years after Odette de Carvalho e Souza.

Vasconcellos was also the first female diplomat to be named consul general of Brazil in New York, where she was responsible for organizing 1962's Bossa Nova show at Carnegie Hall. Her best-known poem is "Canção do Amor", which was performed by Heitor Villa-Lobos.
