= Mexico–Trinidad and Tobago relations =

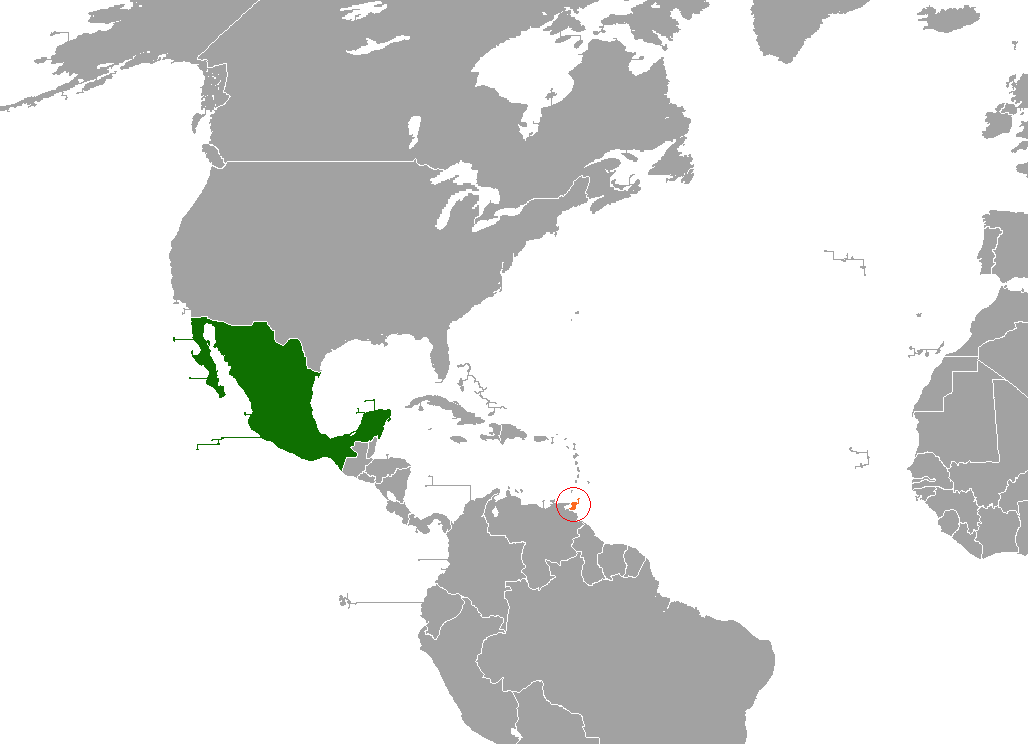

- Mexico: Trinidad and Tobago

The nations of Mexico and Trinidad and Tobago established diplomatic relations in 1966. Both nations are members of the Association of Caribbean States, Community of Latin American and Caribbean States, Organization of American States and the United Nations.

== History ==
Mexico and Trinidad and Tobago are two American nations with an early common history. Initially, both nations had been under control of the Spanish Empire. By 1802, Trinidad and Tobago became part of the British Empire. In 1962, Trinidad and Tobago became an independent nation. On 30 April 1966, Mexico and Trinidad and Tobago established diplomatic relations. In 1982, Mexico opened a resident embassy in Port of Spain, however, in 1985 Mexico closed the embassy due to financial difficulties. The Mexican embassy was re-opened in 1995.

In August 1975, Mexican President Luis Echeverría paid an official visit to Trinidad and Tobago. During his visit he met with Trinidadian Prime Minister Eric Williams. In January 1998, Prime Minister Basdeo Panday paid an official visit to Mexico where he met with Mexican President Ernesto Zedillo. Since the initial visits, there have been a few high-level visits between leaders of both nations.

Both nations have agreed on several bilateral accords and share a commitment to the preservation and sustainability of the Caribbean Sea, and work closely in regional and international organizations. In 2023, both nations celebrated 57 years of diplomatic relations.

== High-level visits ==
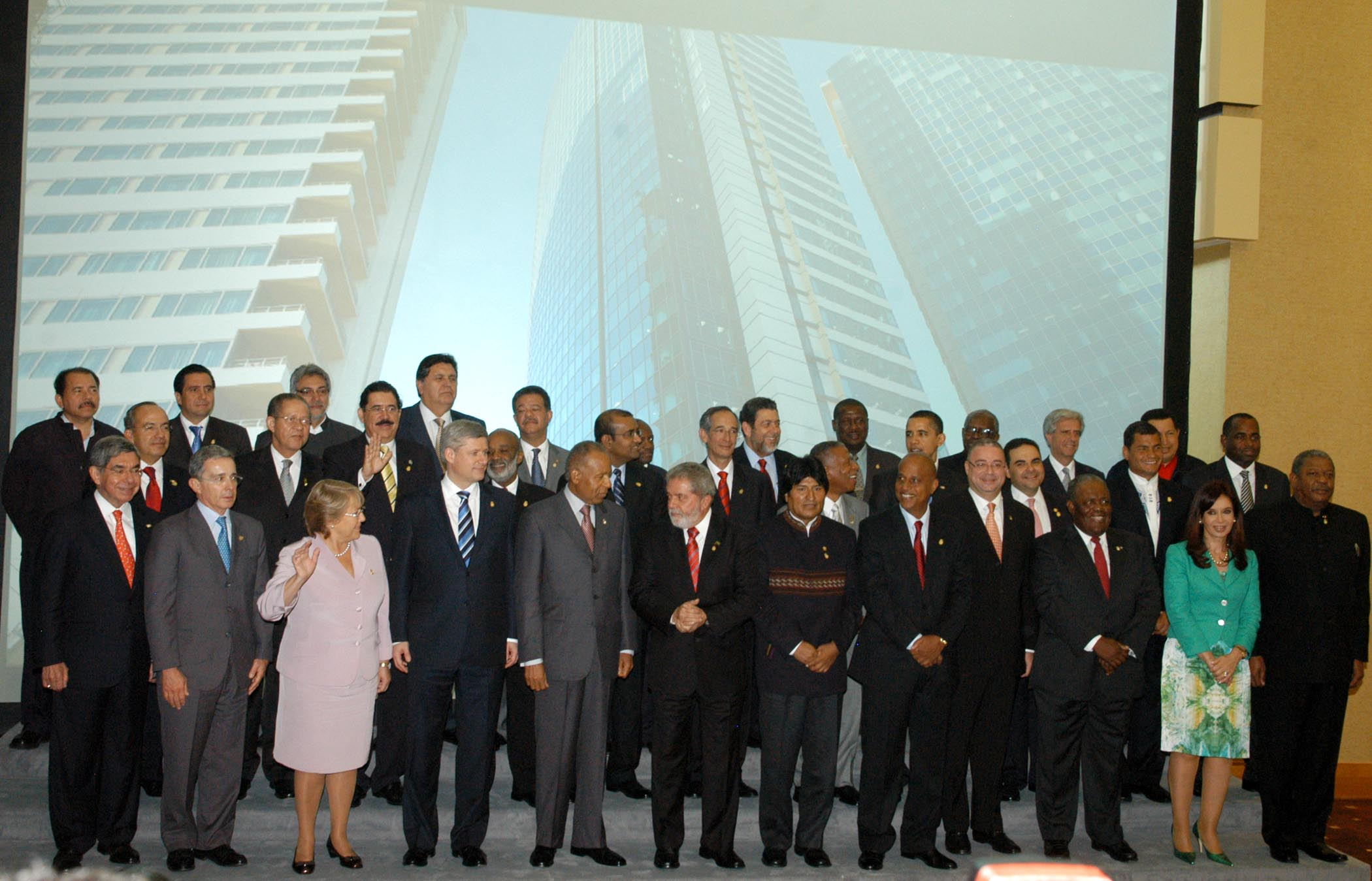
Mexican President Felipe Calderón along with host Prime Minister Patrick Manning attending the 5th Summit of the Americas in Port of Spain, Trinidad and Tobago; April 2009.

High-level visits from Mexico to Trinidad and Tobago

- President Luis Echeverría (1975)
- President Felipe Calderón (2009)
- Foreign Secretary José Antonio Meade (2013)

High-level visits from Trinidad and Tobago to Mexico

- Prime Minister Basdeo Panday (1998)
- Prime Minister Patrick Manning (2008, 2010)
- Foreign Minister Amery Browne (2021)

== Bilateral relations ==
Both nations have signed several bilateral agreements, such as an Agreement of Scientific, Technological, Educational and Cultural Cooperation (1975); Agreement on the Suppression of Visa Requirements for Diplomatic and Official Passport Holders (1997); Agreement of Cooperation in the Fight against Illicit Traffic, Abuse of Narcotic Drugs and Psychotropic Substances and Related Offenses (1998); Agreement on Educational and Cultural Cooperation (1998); Agreement on Technical and Scientific Cooperation (1998); Agreement of the Promotion and Reciprocal Protection of Investments (2006); Agreement on the Suppression of Visa Requirements for Ordinary Passport Holders (2008); Memorandum of Understanding on Diplomatic Academic Collaboration between the Mexican Secretariat of Foreign Affairs and the University of the West Indies, Saint Augustine campus (2016); and a Memorandum of Understanding to Develop Cooperation and Training Activities in the Field of Geospatial Information in Preparations for the Future Operation of the Latin American and Caribbean Space Agency (2022).

== Trade ==
In 2023, trade between Mexico and Trinidad and Tobago totaled US$376 million. Mexico's main exports to Trinidad and Tobago include: machinery and parts, motor vehicles, alcohol, tubes and pipes of iron or steel and chemical based products. Trinidad and Tobago main exports to Mexico include: ammonia and chemical based products. Mexican multinational company Cemex invests and operates in Trinidad and Tobago.

== Resident diplomatic missions ==
- Mexico has an embassy in Port of Spain.
- Trinidad and Tobago is accredited to Mexico from its embassy in Washington, D.C., United States.
