= Carenage =

Town In Trinidad And Trobago

- Town
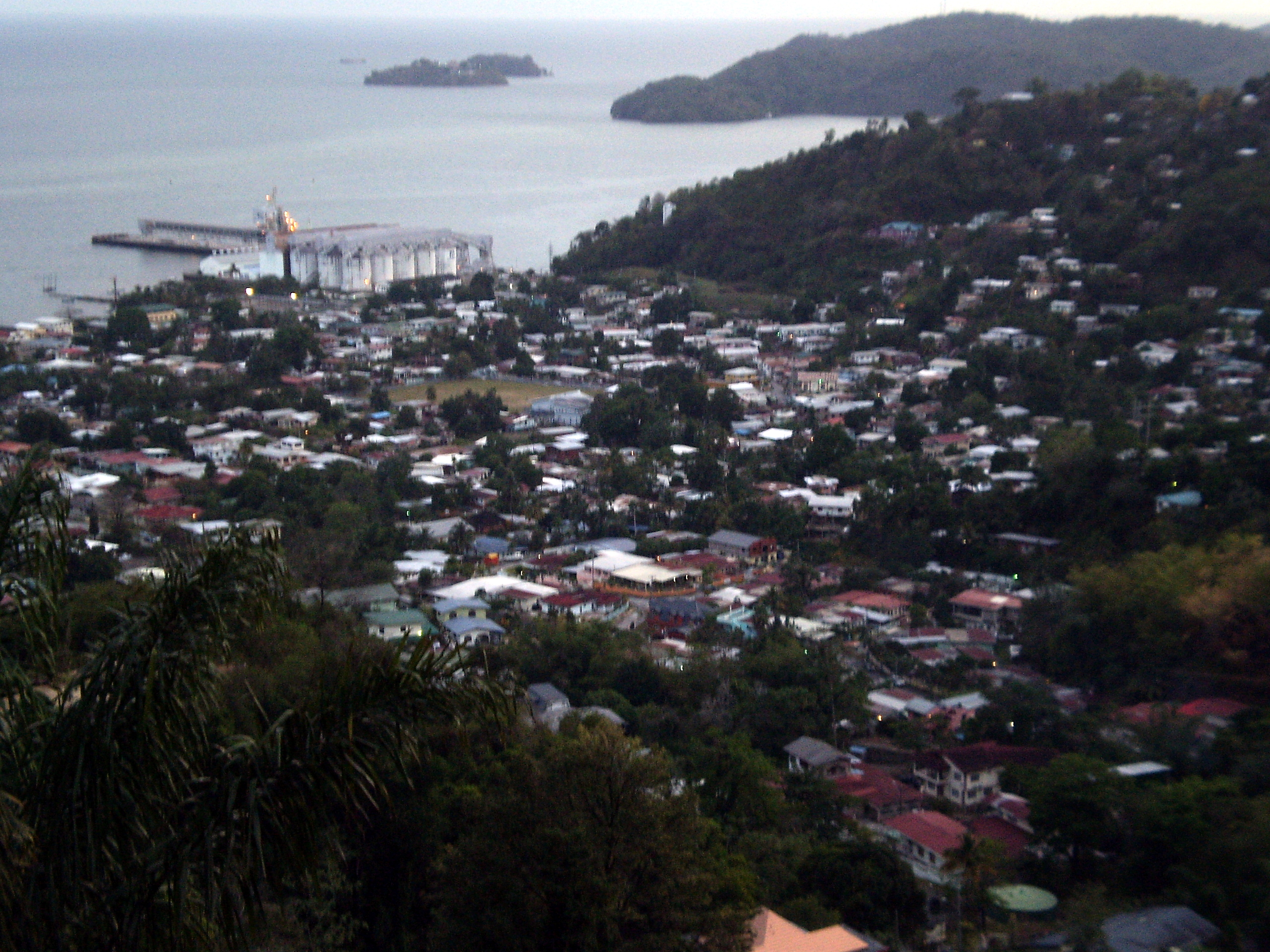
- Carenage

- Location within Trinidad and Tobago
- Coordinates: 10°41′N 61°35′W
- Country: Trinidad and Tobago
- Borough: Diego Martin

Population (2011)
  - Total: 10,188

Carenage is a town in Trinidad and Tobago. It is located on northwestern Trinidad, and is administered by the Diego Martin Regional Corporation. Located close to Chaguaramas, it is more of a residential area than a commercial or industrial locale.

The name is derived from the practice of careening (i.e., beaching, "carénage" in French) sailing vessels for maintenance, which had been done in the area for many years.
