= Oath Keepers in Kentucky =

Militia in the state of Kentucky

The Oath Keepers is a major militia in the state of Kentucky. The militia has recruited hundreds of members from the state and has conducted activities in the state.

== Presence ==
The Oath Keepers has a large presence in Kentucky. The militia has been identified by the Southern Poverty Law Center as one of the eight major anti-government groups in the state. Kentucky has also been described as one of the major 'activity clusters' of the group. As of 2021, the group has 513 members. None of the members were elected officials, though there were four military officers and three law enforcement officials.

== Activities ==
=== Protection of Kim Davis ===
In 2015, the Oath Keepers offered Kim Davis, a Kentucky clerk who refused to provide same-sex marriage licenses, a security detail. The leadership stated they already had troops and a presence on the ground at the time. Davis' legal team declined and said that they did not condone the group's actions. Shortly after, group leadership retracted the offer, but allowed members to go to Rowan County regardless.

=== Actions in Louisville ===
During the Breonna Taylor protests, the Oath Keepers had troops in Louisville for four consecutive days.

On the second day of protests, the group arrived in the city. Members stayed near demonstrators, and had limited confrontations with them. The militia guarded multiple businesses and a parking lot in the downtown area in what they described as a "security operation". The businesses included a food market, gas station, pawn shop, and hotel. The Oath Keepers claimed the businesses had invited the group to the city, though only one business owner confirmed this.

Troops guarded the businesses for three more days without incident and left.

Later examination of the incident during the trial of Stewart Rhodes revealed that the business owner that requested help was actually doing so to keep her salon open in violation of government pandemic orders. At that point, Rhodes sent 'people with armed rifles' to Louisville.

=== Insurgency plan ===
After the January 6 United States Capitol attack, Rhodes discussed an insurgency in the mountains of Kentucky. He proposed 'North Vietnamese-esque' tunnels under the mountains over hundreds of acres of land. Oath Keepers leaders would hide in the tunnels, guarded by 20+ troops above. They would stay on high-ground above the water line, which Rhodes said would give them better fighting advantages. The members that stayed there would live off the land.
