= 2006 United States Senate election in Arizona =

- November 7, 2006
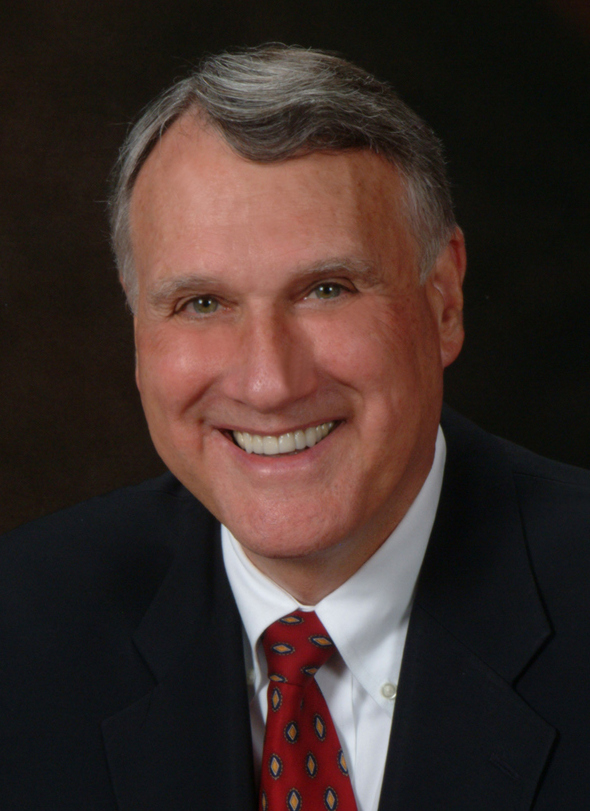

Nominee	Jon Kyl	Jim Pederson
Party	Republican	Democratic
Popular vote	814,398	664,141
Percentage	53.34%	43.50%
- County results Kyl: 50–60% 60–70% Pederson: 50–60% 60–70%
U.S. senator before election
Jon Kyl
Republican
Elected U.S. Senator
Jon Kyl
Republican

The 2006 United States Senate election in Arizona was held November 7, 2006. The primary elections were held September 12. Incumbent Republican Jon Kyl won re-election to a third term.

== Republican primary ==
=== Candidates ===
- Jon Kyl, incumbent U.S. Senator since 1995

=== Results ===
Republican primary results
Party	Candidate	Votes	%
Republican	Jon Kyl (incumbent)	297,636	99.5%
Republican	Write-ins	155	0.05%
Total votes		297,791	100.00%

== Democratic primary ==
=== Candidates ===
- Jim Pederson, real estate developer and former chairman of the Arizona Democratic Party

=== Results ===
Democratic primary results
Party	Candidate	Votes	%
Democratic	Jim Pederson	214,455	100.00%
Total votes		214,455	100.00%

== Libertarian primary ==
=== Candidates ===
- Richard Mack, former Graham County Sheriff

=== Results ===
Libertarian primary results
Party	Candidate	Votes	%
Libertarian	Richard Mack	3,311	100.00%
Total votes		3,311	100.00%

== General election ==
=== Candidates ===
- Jon Kyl (R), incumbent U.S. Senator
- Jim Pederson (D), real estate developer and former Chairman of the Arizona Democratic Party
- Richard Mack (L), former Graham County Sheriff

=== Campaign ===
The incumbent, Republican Jon Kyl, was elected to the Senate in 1994 and was re-elected to a second term in 2000; prior to that he spent eight years in the US House of Representatives. Kyl's Democratic opponent for the general election was wealthy real-estate developer Jim Pederson, who served as the Arizona Democratic Party Chairman from 2001 to 2005. During his tenure, Pederson spent millions of dollars of his own money to help Democrats modernize and to elect Janet Napolitano as Governor of Arizona. The deadline for signing petition signatures to appear on the September 12, 2006, primary ballot was June 14, 2006.

Not long after the 2004 election, Pederson's name began being mentioned as a potential Senate candidate for the 2006 race. On July 28, 2005, Pederson formally stepped down as Chairman of the Arizona Democratic Party, further fueling those speculations. In early September 2005, an e-mail was sent from the Arizona Democratic Party's website, inviting people to an announcement by Pederson on September 7. In an anticlimactic move, an e-mail was sent out shortly after the first saying that the announcement would be postponed due to Hurricane Katrina. It was requested that any money that would be donated to Pederson's campaign at the announcement be directed to relief efforts instead. Similarly, a meeting in Arizona of the Democratic National Committee (DNC) was scheduled for around the same time. It was also postponed and the same request was made involving donations. On September 7, 2005, Pederson filed to run for the U.S. Senate. On September 14, 2005, Pederson formally announced his intention to run, in his hometown of Casa Grande.

Although Kyl started the campaign with a sizable lead in most polls, the gap quickly narrowed, especially after Pederson released his array of ads.

=== Debates ===
- Complete video of debate, October 15, 2006

=== Fundraising ===
The race was one of the most expensive in Arizona history. As of May 7, 2006, Kyl's campaign had raised over $9 million, primarily from private donations from Oil and Energy companies and large fundraising dinners. Pederson's campaign had raised over $5 million, primarily through a dinner event with former President Clinton and a $2 million donation from Pederson.

=== Predictions ===
Source	Ranking	As of
The Cook Political Report	Lean R	November 6, 2006
Sabato's Crystal Ball	Likely R	November 6, 2006
Rothenberg Political Report	Lean R	November 6, 2006
Real Clear Politics	Likely R	November 6, 2006

=== Endorsements ===
Jim Pederson (D)

Individuals

- Wesley Clark, U.S. Army General (ret.), 2004 Democratic presidential candidate

Organizations

- League of Conservation Voters
- Human Rights Campaign

=== Polling ===
Source	Date	Kyl (R)	Pederson (D)	Mack (L)
Arizona State University	October 28, 2005	50%	28%	
Rasmussen	December 26, 2005	50%	30%	
Behavior Research Center	January 22, 2006	55%	26%	
SurveyUSA	February 27, 2006	57%	33%	
Zogby/WSJ	March 30, 2006	47%	42%	
Rasmussen	April 4, 2006	56%	33%	
Arizona State University/KAET-TV	April 20–23, 2006	42%	31%	
Rasmussen	April 30, 2006	51%	35%	
SurveyUSA	May 8, 2006	52%	37%	
Behavior Research Center	May 18, 2006	40%	33%	
Rasmussen	June 11, 2006	52%	35%	
Arizona State University/KAET-TV	June 20, 2006	43%	29%	
Zogby/WSJ	June 21, 2006	48%	42%	
SurveyUSA	July 17, 2006	52%	40%	
Zogby/WSJ	July 24, 2006	50%	40%	
Behavior Research Center	July 26, 2006	45%	27%	
Rasmussen	August 2, 2006	53%	34%	
Zogby/WSJ	August 28, 2006	48%	44%	
Arizona State University/KAET-TV	August 29, 2006	46%	36%	
Rasmussen	August 31, 2006	52%	35%	
Harstad Strategic Research (D)	September 7, 2006	47%	41%	
Zogby/WSJ	September 11, 2006	50%	44%	
Rasmussen	September 18, 2006	50%	39%	
SurveyUSA	September 19, 2006	48%	43%	2%
Arizona State University/KAET-TV	September 26, 2006	49%	38%	2%
Zogby/WSJ	September 28, 2006	51%	44%	
Behavior Research Center	October 4, 2006	40%	34%	
Northern Arizona University	October 17, 2006	49%	33%	2%
SurveyUSA	October 17, 2006	48%	43%	4%
Rasmussen	October 19, 2006	51%	42%	
Zogby/WSJ	October 19, 2006	50%	44%	
Arizona State University/KAET-TV	October 24, 2006	47%	41%	3%
Zimmerman/Marketing Intelligence	October 25–30, 2006	46%	41%	4%
SurveyUSA	November 3, 2006	53%	40%	4%
Mason-Dixon/MSNBC-McClatchy	November 5, 2006	49%	41%	3%

=== Results ===
County Flips: Democratic Flip / Republican Hold

Pederson lost the election by 9.84% or 150,257 votes, despite Democratic incumbent governor Janet Napolitano easily being re-elected and winning every county statewide. While Pederson lost, it was still notable, as it was the worst performance of Senator Kyl's career. Kyl did well as Republicans usually do in Maricopa County, home of Phoenix. Pederson did well in Pima County home of Tucson, which tends to support Democrats. Kyl was called the winner by CNN at around 8 P.M. local time, 11 P.M. EST. Pederson called Senator Kyl and conceded defeat at 9:02 P.M. local time, 12:02 A.M. EST.

2006 United States Senate election in Arizona
Party	Candidate	Votes	%	±%
Republican	Jon Kyl (incumbent)	814,398	53.34%	−25.98%
Democratic	Jim Pederson	664,141	43.50%	+43.50%
Libertarian	Richard Mack	48,231	3.16%	−1.90%
Write-ins		13	0.00%	
Majority		150,257	9.84%	−61.66%
Turnout		1,526,783		
Republican hold		Swing		

==== By county ====
County	Jon Kyl Republican		Jim Pederson Democratic		Various candidates		Margin		Total votes cast
County	#	%	#	%	#	%	#	%	Total votes cast
Apache	6,530	34.8%	11,402	60.8%	831	4.4%	−4,872	−26.0%	18,763
Cochise	20,194	55.6%	14,849	40.9%	1,302	3.6%	5,345	14.7%	36,345
Coconino	16,003	42.0%	20,610	54.1%	1,449	3.8%	−4,607	−12.1%	38,062
Gila	9,512	57.0%	6,643	39.8%	533	3.2%	2,869	17.2%	16,688
Graham	5,127	65.4%	2,194	28.0%	516	6.6%	2,933	47.4%	7,837
Greenlee	1,068	50.2%	942	44.2%	119	5.6%	126	8.0%	2,129
La Paz	2,203	57.5%	1,457	38.0%	173	4.5%	746	19.5%	3,833
Maricopa	491,721	55.7%	364,661	41.3%	26,737	3.0%	127,060	14.4%	883,119
Mohave	26,964	58.7%	16,998	37.0%	1,982	4.3%	9,966	19.7%	45,944
Navajo	13,927	52.2%	11,785	44.2%	951	3.6%	2,142	8.0%	26,663
Pima	128,987	45.9%	144,275	51.3%	7,940	2.8%	−15,288	−6.6%	281,202
Pinal	30,379	53.3%	24,790	43.5%	1,836	3.2%	5,589	9.8%	57,005
Santa Cruz	3,067	37.6%	4,892	60.0%	197	2.4%	−1,825	−22.4%	8,156
Yavapai	43,219	59.7%	26,340	36.4%	2,849	3.9%	16,879	23.3%	72,408
Yuma	15,497	54.1%	12,303	43.0%	828	2.9%	3,194	11.1%	28,628
Totals	814,398	53.3%	664,141	43.4%	50,243	3.3%	150,257	9.9%	1,528,782

Counties that flipped from Republican to Democratic

- Apache (largest municipality: Eagar)
- Santa Cruz (largest municipality: Nogales)
- Coconino (largest municipality: Flagstaff)
- Pima (largest municipality: Tucson)

== See also ==
- 2006 United States Senate elections
