= Jim Pederson (businessman and politician) =

American businessman (born 1942)

James Pederson

Chair of the Arizona Democratic Party
- In office 2001–2005
- Preceded by: Mark Fleisher
- Succeeded by: Harry Mitchell

Personal details
- Born: July 12, 1942 (age 84) Casa Grande, Arizona, U.S.
- Party: Democratic
- Education: University of Arizona

James Pederson (born July 12, 1942), is an American businessman, co-founder of the commercial development firm The Pederson Group, and was the Chairman of the Arizona Democratic Party from 2001 to 2005. In 2006, he ran for a seat in the United States Senate, losing to incumbent Jon Kyl.

== Life and career ==
Pederson was born and raised in Casa Grande, Arizona, the oldest of six brothers. Pederson's father, Ed Pederson, was the City Manager of Casa Grande for 25 years, and his mother, Lillian Pederson, was a registered nurse who stayed home to raise her sons. After high school in Casa Grande, Pederson went to the University of Arizona where he earned a bachelor's degree in political science and a master's in public administration.

After college, Pederson took a job with the Research and Budget Division for the city of Phoenix, and later worked as administrative assistant to Phoenix Mayor Milt Graham. When Graham left office, Pederson entered the commercial-development business working for Grossman Company Properties and Westcor and eventually formed The Pederson Group with his brother Gary. The Pederson Group has since developed over 30 retail projects across Arizona.

Pederson has been married to Roberta Pederson for 52 years. They have 3 children and 6 grandchildren.

== Chairman of the Arizona Democratic Party ==
In 2001, Pederson was elected chairman of the Arizona Democratic Party, which was then in need of funds and new infrastructure. Pederson was able to bring both. He is credited with recruiting two top-notch candidates for statewide office 2002: then-Arizona Attorney General Janet Napolitano for Governor and former Phoenix mayor and gubernatorial candidate Terry Goddard for Attorney General. Both won, and credit is often given to Pederson for his funding, his fundraising ability, and his leadership in rebuilding the Democratic party infrastructure.

Pederson's work, however, did not carry the state for Democratic candidate John Kerry in the 2004 U.S. presidential election, and none of the much-publicized campaigns by Democratic challengers in Arizona for the 2004 United States House of Representatives elections were successful in unseating Republican incumbents. Though the party didn't fare well in the 2004 federal elections, the Democratic Party increased its ranks in the Arizona State House of Representatives and lost only one Arizona State Senate seat, while George W. Bush carried Arizona by more percentage points in 2004 than he did in the 2000 election.

== 2006 United States Senate candidacy ==
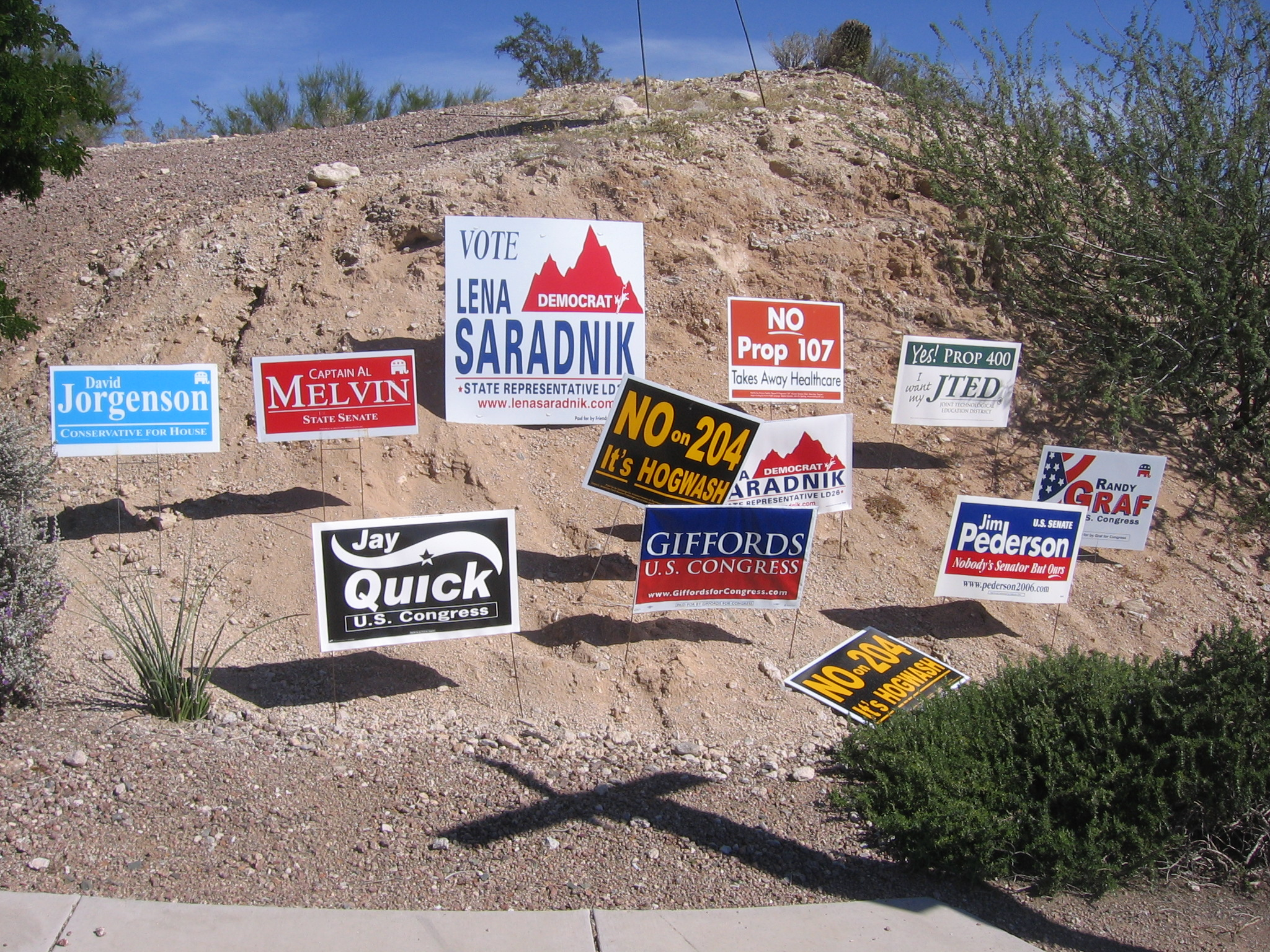
Variety of 2006 AZ CD8 race campaign signs, including for Pederson

On September 14, 2005, Pederson formally announced his intention to run, in his home town of Casa Grande, Arizona. Pederson faced Jon Kyl, an incumbent who ran for a third term in the Senate. Early head-to-head polls showed Kyl significantly ahead of Pederson. In addition, a poll released on September 19, 2006, by SurveyUSA indicated that Kyl was still in the lead, although by a narrower margin: Kyl led Pederson by 48% to 43% with 7% undecided.

The race was one of the most expensive in Arizona history. As of May 7, Kyl's campaign had raised over $9 million primarily from private donations and large fundraising dinners. Pederson's campaign raised over $5 million primarily through a dinner event with former U.S. President Bill Clinton and a $2 million donation from Pederson himself.

In the general election on November 7, 2006, Pederson attained 44% of the popular vote (506,759 votes) compared to 53% of the vote for winner Jon Kyl.

Party political offices
Preceded by Sam Coppersmith	Democratic Party nominee for United States Senator from Arizona (Class 1); 2006	Succeeded by Richard Carmona
