= Graham County Sheriff's Office (Arizona) =

Law enforcement agency

Jurisdictional structure
- Operations jurisdiction: Graham County, Arizona, Arizona, United States
- Map of Graham County Sheriff's Office's jurisdiction
- Area: 4,641 square miles (12,020 km^{2})
- Population: 37,416 (2012)
- Legal jurisdiction: Graham County (excluding San Carlos Indian Reservation)
- General nature: Local civilian police

Operational structure
- Headquarters: Safford, Arizona
- Agency executive: Preston "P.J." Allred, Sheriff

Facilities
- Stations: 1
- Jails: 1

Website
- https://www.graham.az.gov/224/Sheriff

The Graham County Sheriff's Office (GCSO) is a local law enforcement agency that serves Graham County, Arizona. It provides general-service law enforcement to unincorporated areas of Graham County, serving as the equivalent of the police for unincorporated areas of the county. It also operates the county jail system and the 24/7 countywide 911 communications center. The Graham County Sheriff's Office is sometimes referred to as the Graham County Sheriff's Department (GCSD).

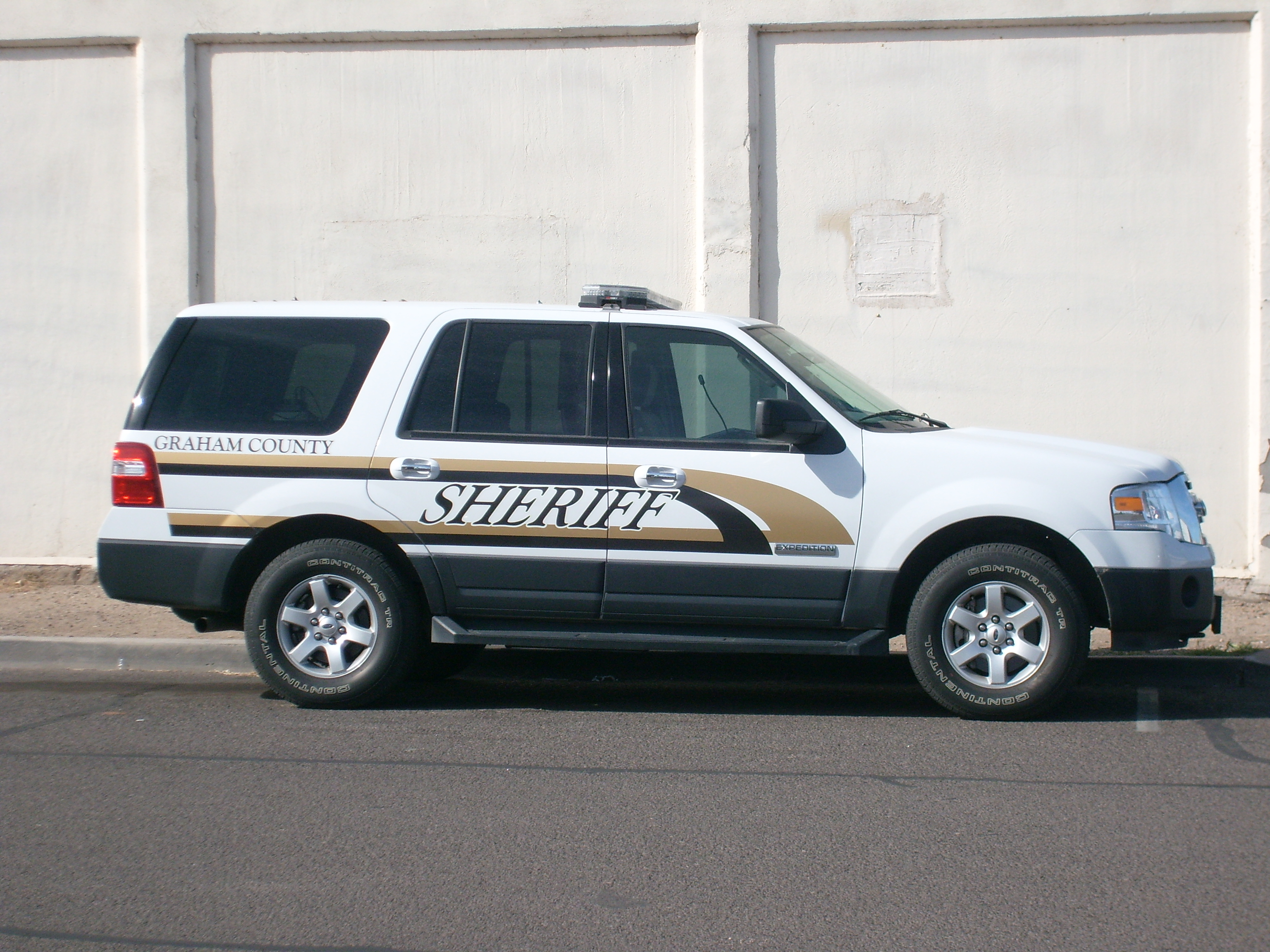
GCSO patrol vehicle in Safford.

== Animal control ==
The GCSO provides animal control services to Thatcher, Pima, and unincorporated areas of the county, as well as assisting Safford Animal Control. Graham County Animal Control is operated under the Graham County Animal Shelter.

== Sheriffs ==
- C.B. Rose (1 Jul 1881- 7 Nov 1881)
- George H. Stevens (7 Nov 1881- 7 Nov 1884)
- Ben M. Crawford (7 Nov 1884- 3 Dec 1885)- Killed By Native Americans
- William Baird Whelan (3 Dec 1885- 7 Nov 1890)
- George A. Olney (7 Nov 1890- 7 Nov 1894)
- Arthur A. Wright (7 Nov 1894- 7 Nov 1896)
- William P. Birchfield (7 Nov 1896- 7 Nov 1898)
- Ben R. Clark (7 Nov 1899- 7 Nov 1900)
- James V. Parks (7 Nov 1900- 7 Nov 1906)
- Alphie A. "Pap" Anderson (7 Nov 1907- 7 Nov 1912)
- Thomas George Alger (7 Nov 1912- 7 Nov 1916)
- Robert Fitzgerald Mcbride (7 Nov 1916- 9 Feb 1918)- Killed in Shootout
- Brig Stewart (9 Feb 1918- 7 Nov 1918)
- John David Skaggs (7 Nov 1918- 7 Nov 1922)
- Samuel Vester Pollock (7 Nov 1922- 7 Nov 1924)'
- Homer Tate (7 Nov 1924- 7 Nov 1926)
- George Samuel Dodge (7 Nov 1926- 7 Nov 1933)
- Hugh Talley (7 Nov 1933- 19 Nov 1936) Died In Office
- Sarah Isabelle "Bell" Talley (acting, 19 Nov 1936- 7 Nov 1938)
- Victor Christensen (7 Nov 1938- 7 Nov 1944)
- James Houston "Skeet" Bowman (7 Nov 1944- 7 Nov 1952)
- E.R. "Zeke" McBride (Jan 1953- Jan 1957
- Joseph Tea ( 7 Nov 1952- 7 Nov 1950)
- James Houston "Skeet" Bowman (7 Nov 1950- 7 Nov 1968)
- Harold Stevens (7 Nov 1968- 7 Nov 1978)
- Roy Curtis (7 Nov 1978- 7 Nov 1988)
- Richard Ivan Mack (7 Nov 1988- 7 Nov 1996)
- Frank Hughes (7 Nov 1996- 7 Nov 2010)
- Preston "P.J." Allred (7 Nov 2010- )

== See also ==
- List of law enforcement agencies in Arizona
