= Stewart Rhodes =

Oath Keepers leader and seditionist (born 1966)

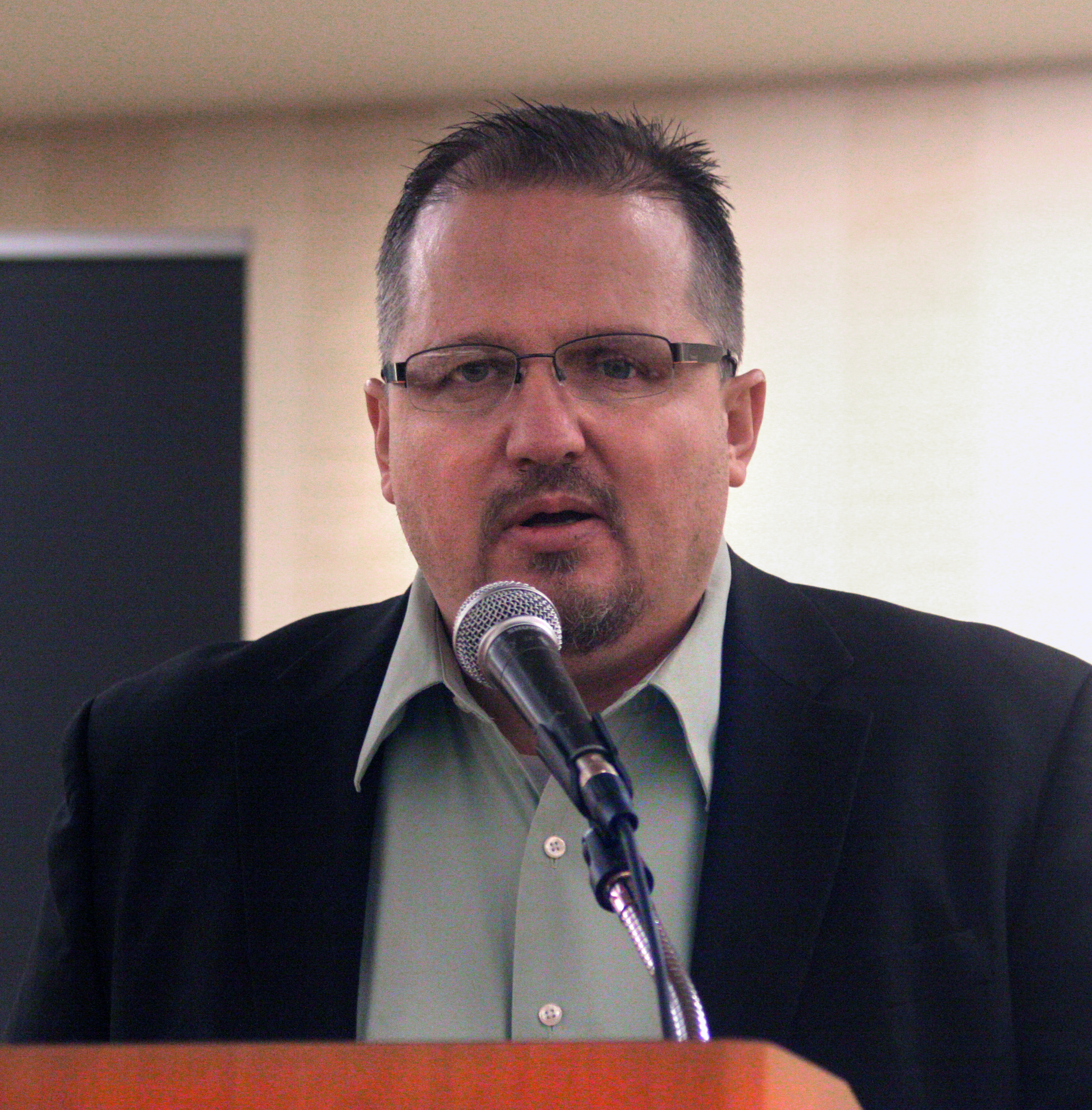
- Rhodes at Nullify Now! event, Phoenix, Arizona, 2011
- Born: Elmer Stewart Rhodes III; 1966 (age 59–60); Fresno, California, U.S.
- Education: University of Nevada, Las Vegas (BA); Yale University (JD)
- Organization: Oath Keepers
- Known for: January 6 United States Capitol attack
- Status: Sentence commuted by President Trump; released from prison on January 21, 2025
- Convictions: Seditious conspiracy (18 U.S.C. § 2384); Obstructing an official proceeding (18 U.S.C. § 1512); Tampering with documents and proceedings (18 U.S.C. § 1512)
- Penalty: Charges dropped

Elmer Stewart Rhodes III (born 1966) is an American former attorney and the founder of the Oath Keepers, an American far-right anti-government militia. In November 2022, he was convicted of seditious conspiracy and evidence tampering related to his participation in the January 6 United States Capitol attack culminating at the main campus of the United States Capitol complex. On May 23, 2023, he was sentenced to 18 years in prison before having his sentence commuted to time served by President Donald Trump following his return to office on January 20, 2025. Rhodes was released from federal prison on January 21, 2025.

== Early life ==
Elmer Stewart Rhodes III was born in 1966 in Fresno, California. His father was a U.S. Marine, and his mother worked on a farm. Rhodes wrote about his father abandoning his mother and him when he was three years old and that he grew up with his mother and her Mexican-American family. In a 2008 blog post, Rhodes described himself as "mixed-race" and said he had “American-Indian” and Hispanic maternal ancestors. From genealogy research, his maternal grandmother, Socorro Sandoval, was a first-generation American. Her parents Jacinto Sandoval and Refugia Parra came to Arizona separately from Mexico in the early 1910s. Jacinto came from Cuquío, Jalisco and Refugia came from Cuajimalpa, a borough of Mexico City.

== Education and career ==
Rhodes attended high school in Las Vegas, then joined the U.S. Army and was honorably discharged after seven months, the result of a spinal injury sustained during airborne school.

After attending community college, Rhodes switched to studying political science at the University of Nevada, Las Vegas, while parking cars to make money. After graduating in 1998, he worked as a staffer for Republican Congressman Ron Paul. Rhodes volunteered for Paul's 2008 presidential campaign and later complained that political opponents of Paul linked Paul to hate groups and racists.

In 2001, at 35, Rhodes enrolled in Yale Law School. He became dissatisfied with what he perceived as eroding rights in the aftermath of the September 11 attacks. Rhodes taught a self-defense class, and his research paper about enemy combatants' classification during the presidency of George W. Bush won an award in his final year at Yale. He graduated in 2004.

After graduating from Yale, Rhodes clerked for Michael D. Ryan, an associate justice at the Arizona Supreme Court. As a lawyer, he worked in various western U.S. states.

On December 8, 2015, Rhodes was disbarred by the Montana Supreme Court for conduct violating the Montana Rules of Professional Conduct after refusing to respond to two bar grievances filed against him in the federal district court of Arizona. The Commission on Practice, which heard the bar complaint against Rhodes, "reasoned that, although Respondent's conduct does not involve conduct that has historically been the basis of disbarment by this Court, Respondent's refusal to cooperate in the disciplinary process constituted a knowing and intentional disregard of his obligations as an attorney ... and, therefore, he should forfeit the privilege of practicing law in Montana and be disbarred."

== Oath Keepers ==
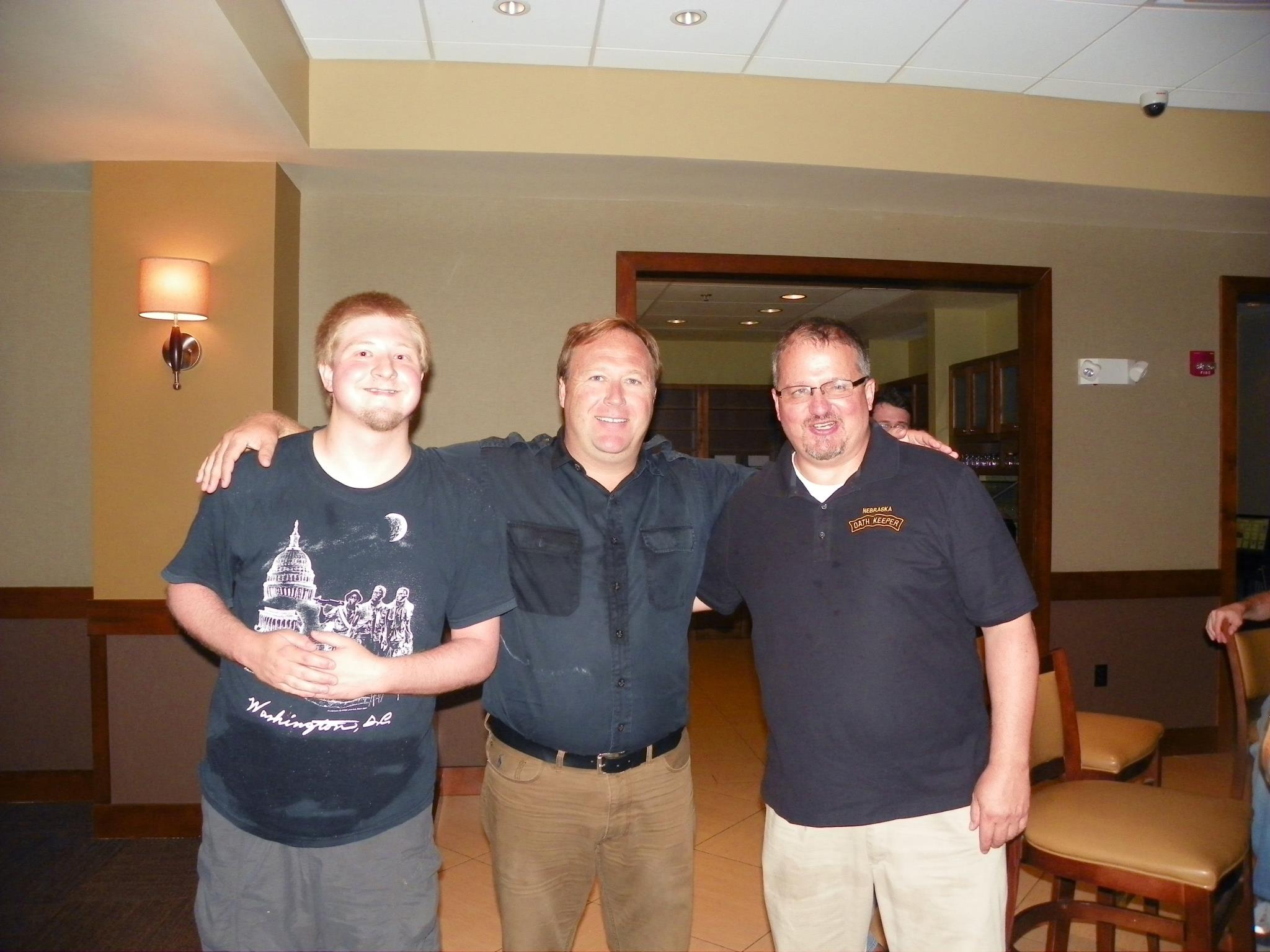
Rhodes (right) with Brian D. Hill (left) and Alex Jones (center), 2012

Rhodes founded the Oath Keepers in March 2009. The organization was launched in Lexington, Massachusetts, at the location of the first American Revolutionary War battle.

In 2013, under Rhodes' presidency, the Oath Keepers instructed its members to form "Citizen Preservation" teams, which included militias, to operate in communities across the U.S. Oath Keepers claimed the effort was to defend citizens against future government-orchestrated chaos that would be followed by instituting martial law and scrapping the Constitution. In his announcement, posted to the Oath Keepers' website, Rhodes states, "They are preparing to control and contain us, and to shoot us, but not preparing to feed us."

Rhodes has collaborated with the states' rights groups the Tenth Amendment Center and the Northwest Patriots. The Southern Poverty Law Center identifies him as an "extremist".

Rhodes is reported to have taken inspiration from the notion that Adolf Hitler could have been stopped if German soldiers and police had refused to follow orders.

Rhodes has promoted the discredited theory of nullification, asserting that U.S. states may disregard federal laws.

=== 2020 United States presidential election ===
For two months after the 2020 United States presidential election, Rhodes encouraged his supporters to reject Joe Biden as the incoming president. Rhodes spoke of a need to take up weapons to prevent Biden's inauguration and launched a campaign to persuade then-President Donald Trump to invoke the Insurrection Act of 1807 and deploy the military and the Oath Keepers as a militia.

=== Attack on United States Capitol ===
On November 7, 2020, after the election had been called for Biden, Rhodes joined a Roger Stone text chat group, asking: "What's the plan?"

On December 12, 2020, Rhodes spoke at a pro-Trump rally in Washington, D.C., along with speakers including Michael Flynn, Sebastian Gorka, Alex Jones, podcaster David Harris Jr., Nick Fuentes, and Mike Lindell. Rhodes called on Trump to invoke the Insurrection Act of 1807 and warned that not doing so would lead to a "much more bloody war".

In the days before January 6, 2021, Rhodes and others traveled to Washington, D.C., where they armed themselves with firearms and tactical gear. En route to D.C., Rhodes personally spent US$20,000 to purchase "a small arsenal". On January 6, 2021, Rhodes entered "restricted Capitol grounds", where he directed Oath Keepers members via telephone and text, telling them which positions to take around the building.

Four days after the attack, Rhodes attended a meeting where he was recorded as saying: "My only regret is that they should have brought rifles... We should have brought rifles. We could have fixed it right then and there. I'd hang fucking Pelosi from the lamppost."

=== Seditious-conspiracy conviction ===
On January 13, 2022, Rhodes and nine other members of the Oath Keepers were arrested and charged with seditious conspiracy. On November 29, 2022, after a nine-week trial, along with Kelly Meggs, Rhodes was convicted of seditious conspiracy and evidence tampering regarding the January 6, 2021, United States Capitol attack. Rhodes was represented by Dallas attorneys James Lee Bright and Philip Linder. Their conviction was the first for seditious conspiracy since 1995. Prosecutors sought a 25-year sentence, which included a terrorism sentencing enhancement. On May 25, 2023, Rhodes received an 18-year sentence, and Meggs received a 12-year sentence. Each was also sentenced to three years' supervised release following their prison terms.

Although Rhodes's sentence was the longest handed down, as of that time, to any of the charged conspirators, the Department of Justice on July 12, 2023, filed a notice of its intention to appeal to the United States Court of Appeals for the District of Columbia Circuit for longer terms for Rhodes and his co-defendants. Rhodes, Meggs, and the other convicted Oath Keepers also filed their appeals. Rhodes served his sentence at Federal Correctional Institution, Cumberland.

=== Presidential commutation ===
On January 20, 2025, Rhodes and several other individuals involved in the January 6 United States Capitol attack received presidential commutations of their sentences on the first day of the second term of President Donald Trump. On January 24, 2025 Rhodes and seven other Oath Keepers were forbidden by the D.C. District Court from entering Washington D.C or the grounds of the Capitol without the permission of the court. On January 27, the order restricting Rhodes' D.C. travel was rescinded.

=== Dismissal of charges ===
The U.S. Department of Justice, in its role as prosecutor, moved on May 22, 2026, to dismiss the indictment. On August 4, Judge Amit P. Mehta ruled that, while he "strongly disagree[d]" with the government's opinion that "surrendering convictions for crimes against the country" served the public interest, he had no authority to deny the prosecutors' request. He dismissed the indictment, noting that the Oath Keepers' case had been "the last of the prosecutions seeking to hold accountable those responsible for the events of January 6."

== Personal life ==
Rhodes married Tasha Adams in 1994 after meeting her a few years earlier in Las Vegas. When they met, Adams was 18 years old and working at an Arthur Murray Dance studio, and Rhodes was a 25-year-old college student. Adams worked as an exotic dancer to financially support Rhodes' education during their marriage. Before their marriage, Rhodes accidentally shot himself in the face with a .22 handgun after dropping it, leaving him using a prosthetic eyeball.

Adams filed for divorce in 2018, accusing Rhodes of emotional and physical abuse. The divorce was granted days before Rhodes was sentenced for his part in the January 6 attack. Adams and Rhodes have six children, including Dakota Adams, their eldest son, who uses his mother's maiden name; Sequoia Adams; and Sedona Adams. The family lived in New Haven and several states in the Western United States.

Dakota Adams has said that his father was abusive to him, his mother, and his siblings; he stated that Rhodes has sabotaged his children's homeschooling and that the family "lived in extreme isolation in one particular cultural bubble in increasingly paranoid and militant right-wing political spheres everywhere we moved in the country until eventually we ended up in Montana." Rhodes required them to line up with their backs to him at ATMs and gas pumps to look for assassins and unload groceries from the family vehicle one-armed to have hands free in case of attack. The children suffered severe medical neglect and were illiterate, and Dakota only learned his multiplication tables at age 19 so that he could pass his high school equivalency test. In the spring of 2024, Dakota Adams announced he was running for the Montana House of Representatives.

In March 2026, while guest-hosting for conspiracy theorist Alex Jones's show, Rhodes stated that he was no longer part of the Make America Great Again movement due to Trump's involvement in the 2026 Iran war. In November 2026, he attended a conference called Christ is King: America After Trump organized by Christian nationalist media company NXR Studios, where he told a journalist that he was "absolutely done with Trump", referring to him as "one of the very worst [traitors] in our nation's history".

== See also ==
- List of cases of the January 6 United States Capitol attack (M-S)
- Criminal proceedings in the January 6 United States Capitol attack
- List of people granted executive clemency in the second Trump presidency
- List of University of Nevada, Las Vegas, alumni
- List of Yale Law School alumni
