= Constitutional Sheriffs and Peace Officers Association =

US political organization of local police officials

- Formation: 2011
- Founder: Richard Mack
- Members: 4,500 (in 2017)
- Website: cspoa.org

The Constitutional Sheriffs and Peace Officers Association (CSPOA) is a political organization of local police officials in the United States who contend that federal and state government authorities are subordinate to the authority of county sheriffs and police.

Founded in 2011, the movement has some ideological similarities with the self-styled patriot movement and sovereign citizen movement, and some members of those movements also espouse "constitutional sheriff" ideology. They and their supporters may refer to themselves as "sovereign sheriffs". The movement is related to previous nullification and interposition notions, and promotes such efforts.

The association has claimed that 300 of the 3,000 sheriffs in the U.S. are members of the organization. It has been described as far-right by the Southern Poverty Law Center.

== Ideology ==
Self-described constitutional sheriffs assert that they are the supreme legal authority with the power and duty to defy or disregard laws they regard as unconstitutional.

Sheriffs are not mentioned in the United States Constitution. However, the Tenth Amendment to the United States Constitution explicitly states that the states and the federal government possess sovereignty and that local government is left to the states. As such, sheriffs and all other local government officials are creations of state law. However, rather than the United States Constitution, the ideological basis of the constitutional sheriffs' movement rests on various incorrect historical and legal claims, relying on a pretense that the historic powers of the high sheriff of an English shire apply in the United States regardless of subsequent legal developments.

Law professor Robert L. Tsai writes that, "in practice constitutional sheriffs and their followers tend to occupy the edges of anti-government conservatism, organizing themselves to promote gun rights and property rights, to resist tax laws, national healthcare, gay marriage." Members of the movement have vowed not to enforce gun laws, public health measures adopted to combat the 2020 COVID-19 pandemic, or federal land use regulations. Sheriffs who refuse to enforce land-use laws facilitate the illegal use of public land (for example, for livestock grazing or all-terrain vehicles use) and in some cases have threatened Bureau of Land Management (BLM) employees. A research study of reports from 1995 to 2015 found that counties with sheriffs who are members of the movement "have higher rates of violence against BLM employees than other Western counties."

== History ==
The "constitutional sheriff" or "county supremacy" movement arose from the far-right Posse Comitatus, a racist and anti-Semitic group of the 1970s and 1980s that also defined the county sheriff as the highest "legitimate" authority in the country, and was characterized by paramilitary figures and the promotion of conspiracy theories.

The association was founded in 2011 by former Arizona sheriff Richard Mack who was a board member of the Oath Keepers at the time.

In the aftermath of the 2020 election, Barry County, Michigan, Sheriff Dar Leaf, a member of the constitutional sheriffs movement, tried to seize voting machines in an effort to prove election fraud. He also took legal action in December 2020, attempting to stop local clerks from deleting election records. The chief judge of the federal court in Grand Rapids denied the request.

By 2023, the association was being led by Sam Bushman, who has been scrutinized for his affiliation with neo-Confederates and white nationalists, including a close friendship with radio host James Edwards.

In the run-up to the 2024 election the group trained armed militias, built ties to Trump supporters, and built "posses" to patrol polling stations.

== Support ==
A number of county sheriffs in the United States have expressed sympathy with the movement's goals and have publicly vowed not to enforce laws they deem unconstitutional.

The movement has attracted support from some landowners, county commissioners, law enforcement figures (in particular Richard Mack and Joe Arpaio), and some politicians who have played on "fears of federal officials intruding on property rights and gun rights."

The CSPOA has claimed various membership numbers. In 2017, the association said it had 4,500 dues-paying members, with more than 200 sheriffs among them. In 2020, the group claimed a membership of 400. In 2021, Mack said that 300 of the 3,000 sheriffs in the U.S. were members of the association. However, no reliable numbers are available as, according to the Associated Press, details of the group's operations, including membership numbers, are closely held.
