= Tenth Amendment Center =

American political organisation

- Formation: 2007
- Headquarters: Irvine, California
- Executive Director: Michael Boldin
- Website: www.tenthamendmentcenter.com

The Tenth Amendment Center is an American privately held think tank that advocates states' rights and restricting federal power.

== Organization ==
The Tenth Amendment Center was founded in 2007 by Michael Boldin, its Executive Director.

== Activities ==
The Tenth Amendment Center lobbies against US federal legislation that it considers to be at odds with the Constitution of the United States. It has been described by the Southern Poverty Law Center as politically far right.

In 2016, in what was described as an "unusual partnership" in Education Week, the Tenth Amendment Center partnered with the American Civil Liberties Union to propose suggested legislation to protect student data privacy.

According to the Southern Poverty Law Center the organization has partnered with groups including the Oath Keepers and the League of the South.

== See also ==
- Tenth Amendment to the United States Constitution
- Tenther movement
