= Dakota Adams =

American politician

- Born: 1996 (age 29–30); United States
- Occupations: Student; volunteer firefighter; construction worker

Dakota Adams (born 1996–1997) is an American from Montana who ran as a Democrat for the Montana House of Representatives in District 1 in northern Lincoln County in the 2024 United States elections. Adams is the oldest son of Oath Keeper Stewart Rhodes, who was serving an 18-year prison term for seditious conspiracy, until being pardoned by Donald Trump. Adams was homeschooled and raised with extreme Right-wing, prepper conspiracy theories. He left the American militia movement during his teenage years and wrote about his reasoning for Raw Story in 2022.

== Early life ==
The oldest son of six children of Stewart Rhodes and Tasha Adams, Dakota Adams was homeschooled and purposely kept uneducated for his father to hold power over the household, keeping the threat of child protective services breaking up the family if they were to discover the children were not being educated by the state's laws. As a child he answered emails for the Oath Keepers and trained for the apocalypse. After leaving the militia world, Adams began to catch up on the education he was lacking, one area he had to learn was the multiplication table. He eventually passed a high-school equivalency exam.

According to an interview with Laura Coates for CNN Adams described his upbringing as being in an "extreme bubble of fear and isolation and paranoid ideology starting well before the founding of the Oath Keepers". He stated that Rhodes was a "pure authoritarian that was very much reflected at home". The family managed to get away from Rhodes in 2018.

He plans to sell the militia paraphernalia he used to wear to "anti-government protests alongside his father".

== 2024 political run ==
Calling himself a "progressive Democrat" and an "honest weirdo", Adams believes that the residents of Montana deserve to have a choice of candidates. In 2022 he noticed that the ballot was mostly Republicans running unopposed, stating that he wants to show that "more ordinary people" can step up and run for office. When asked in an interview why he was running he stated that he needs to "walk the walk" and stop "yelling at other people to do something". He believes that the Republican Party in Montana have "failed the people in the state with a disastrous legislative session of mismanagement, performative virtue signaling, culture war issues over and over. ... Real problems and utter disregard for the welfare of the people of this state".

Adams opposes gun control laws saying that laws will harm disadvantaged groups from owning guns, though he advocates for a rehabilitation of gun culture calling it "vanity-based, hyper-individualist ego trip culture". He ran against Neil Duram, a member of the Montana House of Representatives who was elected unopposed in 2018. Adams uses his mother's maiden name instead of Rhodes, and "campaigns wearing band t-shirts and wearing black nail polish", refusing to conform to the standard dress codes of politicians. The Montana Democrats "are happy to have Adams on the ballot as Democrats have been hesitant to run in the deeply red district".

He planned on running on "core practical concerns such as housing costs, rising property taxes, inflation and abortion rights". Adams says that Montana needs to have a plan to deal with rising real estate costs and sprawl.

Adams lost in his bid to represent Montana's District 1 as a Democrat. He lost to Republican incumbent Neil Duram by a margin of 5541 to 1388.
