= Jon Kyl =

American politician and lobbyist (1942–2026)

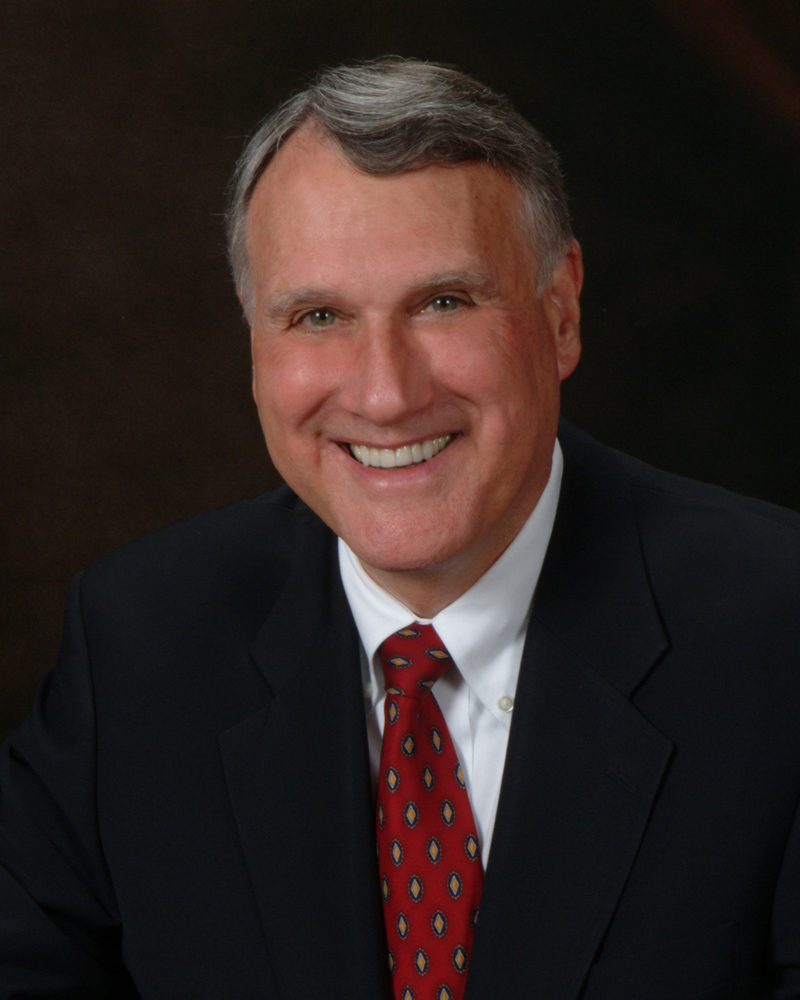
- Official portrait, 2004

United States Senator from Arizona
- In office September 4, 2018 – December 31, 2018
- Appointed by: Doug Ducey
- Preceded by: John McCain
- Succeeded by: Martha McSally
- In office January 3, 1995 – January 3, 2013
- Preceded by: Dennis DeConcini
- Succeeded by: Jeff Flake
Senate positions
Senate Minority Whip
In office December 19, 2007 – January 3, 2013
Leader	Mitch McConnell
Preceded by	Trent Lott
Succeeded by	John Cornyn
Chair of the Senate Republican Conference
In office January 3, 2007 – December 19, 2007
Leader	Mitch McConnell
Preceded by	Rick Santorum
Succeeded by	Lamar Alexander
Chair of the Senate Republican Policy Committee
In office January 3, 2003 – January 3, 2007
Leader	Bill Frist
Preceded by	Larry Craig
Succeeded by	Kay Bailey Hutchison

Member of the U.S. House of Representatives from Arizona's 4th district
- In office January 3, 1987 – January 3, 1995
- Preceded by: Eldon Rudd
- Succeeded by: John Shadegg

Personal details
- Born: Jon Llewellyn Kyl; April 25, 1942 Oakland, Nebraska, U.S.
- Died: September 17, 2026 (aged 84) Phoenix, Arizona, U.S.
- Party: Republican
- Spouse: Caryll Collins (m. 1964)
- Children: 2
- Parent: John Kyl (father)
- Education: University of Arizona (BA, LLB)
- Kyl's voice Kyl before his first retirement from the Senate reflecting on his service with John McCain. Recorded December 18, 2012

Jon Llewellyn Kyl (/ˈkaɪl/ KYLE; April 25, 1942 – September 17, 2026) was an American politician and lobbyist who served as a United States Senator for Arizona from 1995 to 2013. Following the death of John McCain in 2018, Kyl briefly returned to the Senate; his resignation led to the appointment of Martha McSally in 2019. He held both of Arizona's Senate seats at different times, serving alongside McCain during his first stint. A member of the Republican Party, he also served as Senate Minority Whip from 2007 until 2013. He previously served in the United States House of Representatives from 1987 to 1995. He first joined the lobbying firm Covington & Burling after retiring in 2013, then rejoined in 2019.

The son of U.S. Representative John Henry Kyl and Arlene (née Griffith) Kyl, Kyl was born and raised in Nebraska and lived for some time in Iowa. He received his bachelor's degree and law degree from the University of Arizona. He worked in Phoenix, Arizona, as an attorney and lobbyist before winning election to the United States House of Representatives, where he served from 1987 to 1995. He was elected to the U.S. Senate in 1994 and continued to be re-elected by comfortable margins until his retirement in January 2013. In 2006, he was recognized by Time magazine as one of America's Ten Best Senators. Kyl was ranked by National Journal in 2007 as the fourth-most conservative U.S. Senator. He was a fixture of Republican policy leadership posts, chairing the Republican Policy Committee (2003–2006) and the Republican Conference (2006–2007) before becoming Senate Minority Whip until his retirement in 2013. He was named one of the Time 100 most influential people in the world in 2010 for his persuasive role in the Senate.

After leaving the Senate in 2013, Kyl worked as an attorney and lobbyist and then worked to shepherd the Supreme Court nomination of Brett Kavanaugh in 2018.

In September 2018, Kyl was appointed by Governor Doug Ducey to serve in the Class 3 Senate seat left vacant by the death of John McCain. Kyl was the first person to return to the Senate via appointment since New Hampshire Republican Norris Cotton in 1975. Kyl resigned from the Senate effective December 31, 2018, and was succeeded by Martha McSally.

== Early life, education and career ==
Kyl was born in Oakland, Nebraska, on April 25, 1942, the son of Arlene (née Griffith) and John Henry Kyl, a teacher at Nebraska State Teachers College. His father, the son of Dutch immigrants, served as a Congressman from Iowa after moving his family to Bloomfield, Iowa. After graduating from high school in 1960, Kyl attended the University of Arizona, where he earned a bachelor's degree in 1964, graduating with honors. Kyl was a member of the Pi Kappa Alpha fraternity. He then earned a law degree in 1966 at the University of Arizona's James E. Rogers College of Law, and served as editor-in-chief of the Arizona Law Review. Before entering politics, he was a lawyer and lobbyist with Jennings, Strouss & Salmon in Phoenix, Arizona. He also worked as an attorney at Mountain States Legal Foundation in Denver, Colorado, prior to running for office.

He was a Presbyterian. Kyl was married to Caryll Collins and they had two children together. They also had four grandchildren.

== U.S. House of Representatives ==
=== Elections ===
==== 1986 ====
Kyl was first elected in 1986 against Democrat Philip R. Davis, 65% to 35%.

==== 1988 ====
Kyl was re-elected in 1988 against Gary Sprunk of the Libertarian Party, 87% to 13%;

==== 1990 ====
Kyl was re-elected in 1990 against Democrat Mark Ivey Jr., 61% to 39%;

==== 1992 ====
For his first six terms, Kyl represented most of the northeastern portion of the state, from heavily Republican northern Phoenix to the New Mexico border. Redistricting after the 1990 census carved away all of Kyl's former territory outside the Valley of the Sun. The new 4th, however, was as safely Republican as its predecessor, and Kyl easily won reelection in 1992 against Democrat Walter R. Mybeck II, 59% to 27%.

=== Tenure ===
Kyl served in the House of Representatives from 1987 to 1995. Kyl voted for the Abandoned Shipwrecks Act of 1987. The Act asserts United States title to certain abandoned shipwrecks located on or embedded in submerged lands under state jurisdiction, and transfers title to the respective state, thereby empowering states to manage these cultural and historical resources more efficiently, with the goal of preventing treasure hunters and salvagers from damaging them. President Ronald Reagan signed it into law on April 28, 1988.

== U.S. Senate (1995–2013) ==
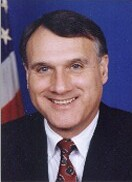
An early congressional portrait of Kyl

=== Elections ===
==== 1994 ====
Kyl was first elected to the Senate in 1994, defeating Samuel G. Coppersmith (D), then a member of the House of Representatives, 54% to 40%. Libertarian Party candidate Scott Grainger got 6% of the votes.

==== 2000 ====
Kyl was re-elected in 2000 without major-party opposition, with 79% of the vote. Independent William Toel got 8%; Green Party candidate Vance Hansen also got 8%; and Barry Hess of the Libertarian Party got 5%.

==== 2006 ====
On November 7, 2006, Kyl defeated real estate developer and former Arizona Democratic Party chairman Jim Pederson to win his third term in the Senate. Kyl won with 53% of the vote; Pederson received 44%; and Libertarian Party candidate Richard Mack received 3%. The race was one of the most expensive in Arizona history, with Kyl raising more than $15 million and Pederson raising just shy of that amount.

A major issue in the campaign was illegal immigration. While in the Senate, Kyl cosponsored legislation that would give illegal immigrants up to five years to leave the country. Once there, they could apply for permanent residence or be guest workers. Since fellow Arizona Senator John McCain opposed this legislation, Pederson tried to use the issue as a way of allying with McCain and dividing Republicans in Arizona. Controversy also arose when each candidate accused the other of supporting the amnesty provisions in a 1986 immigration bill, although both candidates denied ever supporting those provisions.

=== Leadership ===
Kyl was elected by his fellow Senate Republicans to a succession of leadership posts: Policy Committee chairman (2003–2007), Conference chairman (2007), and finally Senate Minority Whip in December 2007. Kyl's ascension to Minority Whip rendered him the first Arizonan to hold such an influential Senate leadership post since Democrat Ernest W. McFarland served as Senate Majority Leader from 1951 to 1953. Kyl was the only Arizona Republican to hold that leadership position.

=== Tenure ===
Kyl voted to confirm John Roberts as Chief Justice of the U.S. Supreme Court as well as Samuel Alito as Associate Justice of the U.S. Supreme Court. However, he voted against the nominations of Sonia Sotomayor and Elena Kagan for associate justice.

In 2010, Democratic Senate Leader Harry Reid wanted the Senate to return to work on the week between Christmas and New Year's in order to pass time-critical legislation including the James Zadroga 9/11 Health and Compensation Act, which would ensure health coverage for 9/11 first responders. Kyl made a public comment that this would disrespect "one of the two holiest of holidays for Christians and the families of all of the Senate". First responder Kenny Specht appeared on The Daily Show and replied, "You won't find a single New York firefighter who considers it a sign of disrespect to work in a New York City firehouse on New Year's Eve or New Year's Day." The Zadroga Act passed on December 22.

During a Senate debate on April 8, 2011, Kyl said that performing abortions is "well over 90 percent of what Planned Parenthood does". Planned Parenthood responded that 90 percent of its services are to provide contraception, STD and cancer testing and treatment, and only 3 percent are abortion-related. A spokesperson for Kyl later claimed the senator's remark "was not intended to be a factual statement but rather to illustrate that Planned Parenthood, an organization that receives millions in taxpayer dollars, does subsidize abortions". Politifact noted that Planned Parenthood's numbers (from their most recent Annual Report, year ending June 30, 2009) are the result of self-reporting and that there is no national audit on such claims, but stated their belief that Kyl "vastly overstated" the number. Michael New, a political science professor writing at National Review suggested that perhaps Kyl's comments were based on the pregnancy-related services provided to pregnant women, citing Planned Parenthood's 2009 annual report figures and claiming that 98% of those services were for abortion. The phrase "not intended to be a factual statement" was mocked by political comedians such as Stephen Colbert, who joked, "You can't call him out for being wrong when he never intended to be right."

In 2012, Kyl voted against ratification of the UN Treaty Convention on the Rights of Persons with Disabilities.

=== Committee assignments ===
- Committee on the Judiciary
  - United States Senate Judiciary Subcommittee on Crime and Terrorism (Ranking Member)
  - United States Senate Judiciary Subcommittee on the Constitution, Civil Rights and Human Rights
  - United States Senate Judiciary Subcommittee on Immigration, Refugees and Border Security
- Committee on Finance
  - United States Senate Finance Subcommittee on Taxation and IRS Oversight (Ranking Member)
  - United States Senate Finance Subcommittee on Health Care
  - United States Senate Finance Subcommittee on Social Security, Pensions, and Family Policy
- Joint Select Committee on Deficit Reduction

== U.S. Senate (2018) ==
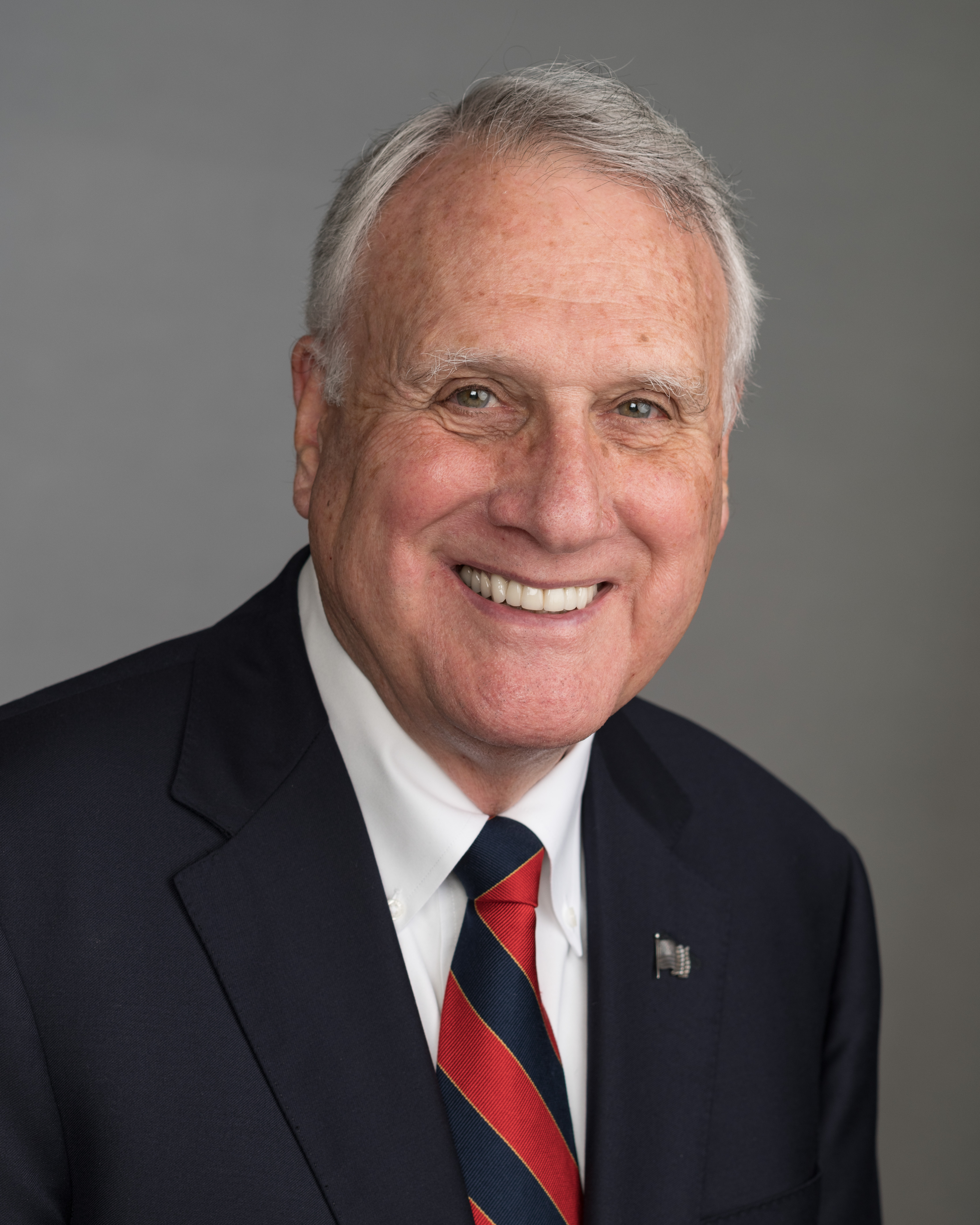
Kyl's second Senate portrait after his appointment, 2018

On September 4, 2018, Kyl was appointed by Republican Arizona governor Doug Ducey that had been vacated due to recent death of former Senator John McCain a week earlier until a 2020 special election could be held. He was the second of four Senators to serve during the nineteenth Senate term for the Arizona's Class 3 seat, from January 3, 2017 to January 3, 2023.

Kyl was only the sixth person to return to the Senate via appointment since the ratification of the Seventeenth Amendment (mandating the direct election of U.S. senators) in 1913. The last preceding case had been Norris Cotton (New Hampshire), who in 1975 was appointed back to the Senate after the disputed election of 1974.

Prior to being reappointed to the Senate, Kyl served in 2018 as sherpa for Brett Kavanaugh's nomination to the Supreme Court in 2018. Kyl voted in favor of the confirmation of Brett Kavanaugh to the Supreme Court. He opposed the FIRST STEP Act. The bill passed 87–12 on December 18, 2018.

Kyl's intention was to serve until the end of the 115th Congress, and he resigned from the Senate effective December 31, 2018, in order to allow a new appointee to serve the full term of the 116th Congress. He was succeeded by Congresswoman Martha McSally, a fellow Republican.

=== Committee assignments ===
- Committee on Armed Services
  - Subcommittee on Airland
  - Subcommittee on Seapower
  - Subcommittee on Strategic Forces
- Committee on Homeland Security and Governmental Affairs
- Committee on Indian Affairs

== Political positions ==
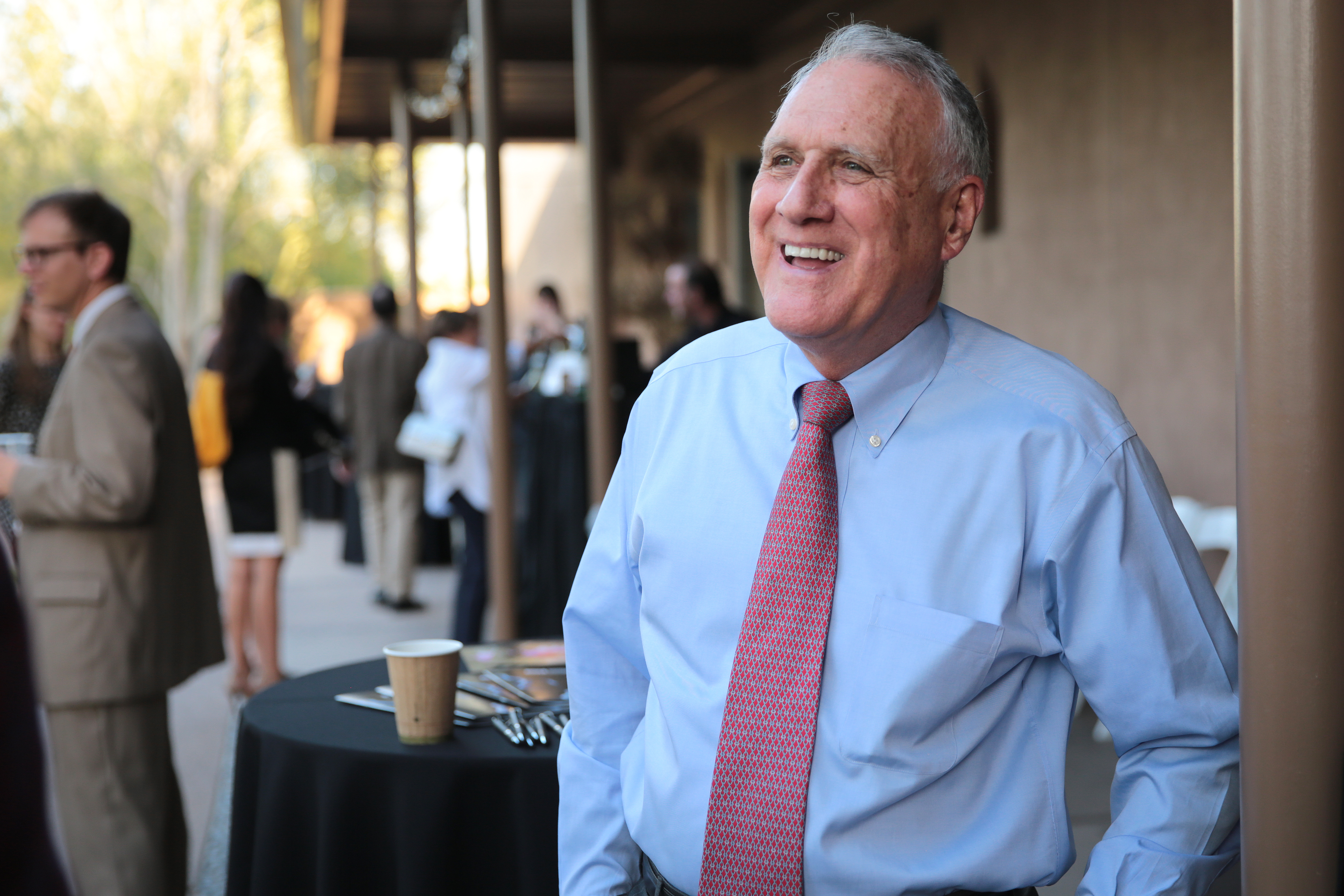
Kyl at an event in Phoenix in April 2017.

Kyl was considered to be a conservative and was ranked by National Journal as the fourth-most conservative United States Senator in their March 2007 conservative/liberal rankings. In addition, in April 2006, Kyl was selected by Time Magazine as one of "America's 10 Best Senators"; the magazine cited his successful behind-the-scene efforts as head of the Senate Republican Policy Committee. Senator Kyl earned a 96.58% Lifetime Score from the American Conservative Union.

Kyl was a signer of Americans for Tax Reform's Taxpayer Protection Pledge.

=== Crime victims' rights ===
Kyl was one of the original sponsors, along with Democratic Senator Dianne Feinstein, of an effort to amend the United States Constitution to protect crime victims' rights in the criminal justice system. When in 2004 it appeared that the constitutional amendment would not receive the requisite 2/3 support to pass the Senate, Kyl and Feinstein authored the Crime Victims' Rights Act, which listed a victims' bill of rights and provided mandamus relief in appellate court for any victim denied those rights. The act also offered sanctions against government officials who wantonly and willfully refused to comply with the Crime Victims' Rights Act.

=== Arms control ===
In November 2010, Kyl opposed the New START arms control treaty's ratification in the lame-duck session. Nevertheless, the treaty passed with a vote of 71–26, clearing the constitutionally mandated two-thirds threshold by the narrowest margin of any nuclear arms control treaty ever ratified by the United States.

=== Internet gambling ===
Kyl and Bob Goodlatte were among the first in the United States to draft legislation on online gambling. In the late 1990s, they introduced bills to the Senate that would curb online gambling activities except for those that involved horse and dog races and state lotteries. The bill by Kyl, known as the Kyl bill, was not passed in the end due to certain loopholes. Attorney Jorge Van, at the time principal investigator of the National Gambling Impact Study Commission on Internet Gambling, pointed out that under the Kyl bill "state lotteries would be able to offer a variety of games under the guise of a lottery, including slot machines", which ultimately would allow "interactive wagering at home on the internet which the law aimed to prevent in the first place".

In September 2006, working with Congressman Jim Leach, Kyl was a major Senate supporter of Unlawful Internet Gambling Enforcement Act of 2006. The Act was passed at midnight the day Congress adjourned before the 2006 elections. Before it was added to the bill, the gambling provisions had not been debated by any Congressional committee, although the general issue had been debated in multiple times in the past. When publication of the associated regulations was delayed until June 2010, Kyl responded by denying unanimous consent to confirm the appointment of 6 nominees to the U.S. Treasury Department, none of whom specialized on gambling issues.

=== Healthcare ===
Kyl voted against the Patient Protection and Affordable Care Act (Obamacare) in December 2009, and he voted against the Health Care and Education Reconciliation Act of 2010.

=== Other ===
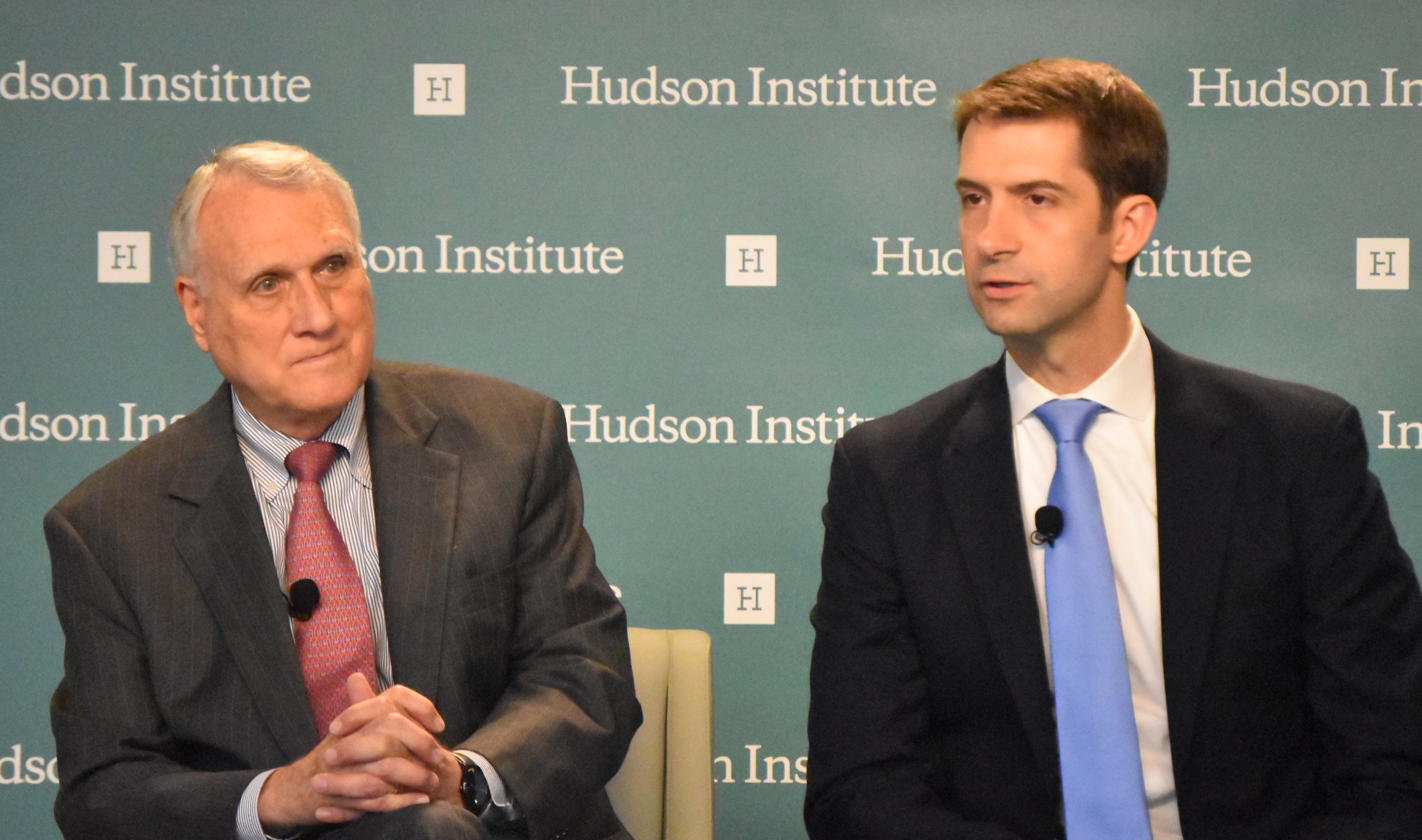
Kyl and Senator Tom Cotton speaking at the Hudson Institute

In February 2006, Kyl joined Senator Lindsey Graham in an amicus brief in the Hamdan v. Rumsfeld case. The brief presented to the Supreme Court of the United States an "extensive colloquy" added to the Congressional Record. It was not, however, included in the December 21 debate as evidence that "Congress was aware" that the Detainee Treatment Act of 2005 would strip the Court of jurisdiction to hear "pending cases, including this case" brought by the Guantanamo detainees.

In the spring of 2009, Kyl invited Geert Wilders to show his film Fitna to the United States Congress, which led to American Muslim protests.

In 2011, Kyl said that the GOP had abandoned opposition to defense cuts.

== Death ==
On December 30, 2025, Kyl announced his dementia diagnosis and retirement from public life. Subsequently, the University of Arizona announced that it had been selected as the repository for Kyl's papers. He died of complications from a neurological disease at his home in Phoenix, on September 17, 2026, at the age of 84.

Following his death, The New York Times said that Kyl earned a "reputation as a quiet but effective policy expert, political operator and party leader".

U.S. House of Representatives
Preceded by Eldon Rudd	Member of the U.S. House of Representatives from Arizona's 4th congressional district 1987–1995	Succeeded by John Shadegg
Party political offices
Preceded by Keith DeGreen	Republican nominee for U.S. Senator from Arizona (Class 1); 1994, 2000, 2006	Succeeded by Jeff Flake
Preceded by Phil Gramm	Chair of the Senate Republican Steering Committee; 2001–2003	Succeeded by Jeff Sessions
Preceded by Larry Craig	Chair of the Senate Republican Policy Committee; 2003–2007	Succeeded by Kay Hutchison
Preceded by Rick Santorum	Chair of the Senate Republican Conference; 2007	Succeeded by Lamar Alexander
Preceded by Trent Lott	Senate Republican Whip; 2007–2013	Succeeded by John Cornyn
U.S. Senate
Preceded by Dennis DeConcini	U.S. Senator (Class 1) from Arizona; 1995–2013; Served alongside: John McCain	Succeeded by Jeff Flake
Preceded by Trent Lott	Senate Minority Whip; 2007–2013	Succeeded by John Cornyn
Preceded by John McCain	U.S. Senator (Class 3) from Arizona; 2018; Served alongside: Jeff Flake	Succeeded by Martha McSally
