= Richard Mack =

American activist and former Arizona sheriff (born 1952)

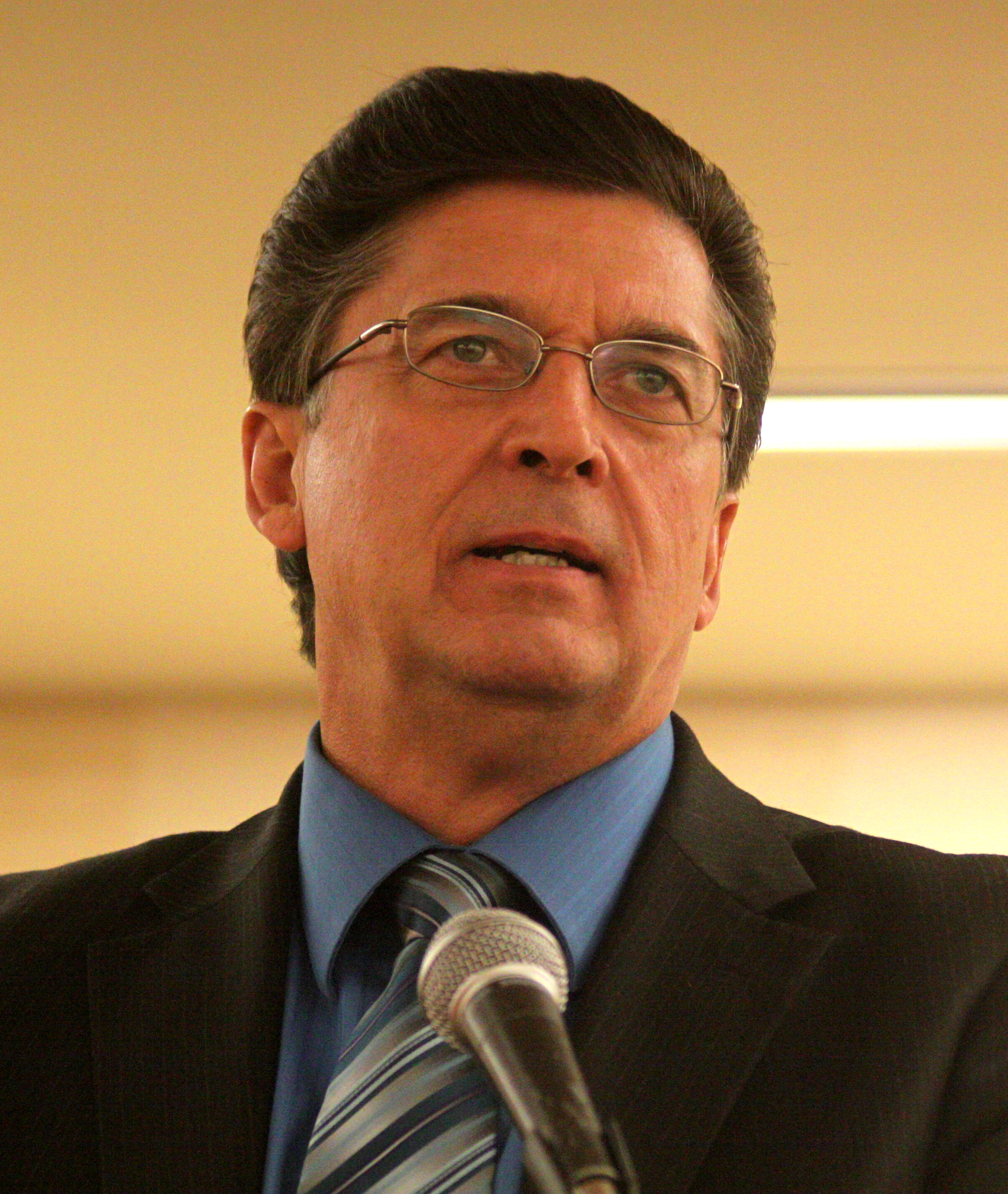
- Mack in downtown Phoenix, Arizona in January 2011.

Sheriff of Graham County, Arizona
- In office 1988–1996

Personal details
- Born: Richard Ivan Mack; December 27, 1952 (age 73) Arizona, United States
- Party: Libertarian; Republican
- Occupation: Founder of Constitutional Sheriffs and Peace Officers Association
- Known for: Printz v. United States

Richard Ivan Mack (born December 27, 1952) is an American politician who served as the sheriff of Graham County, Arizona from 1988 to 1996. A former lobbyist for Gun Owners of America, he is known for his role in a successful lawsuit which alleged that portions of the Brady Handgun Violence Prevention Act violated the United States Constitution. Mack is also the founder of Constitutional Sheriffs and Peace Officers Association and sits on the board of directors of the Oath Keepers.

== Career ==
=== Law enforcement ===
Mack spent eleven years with the police department of Provo, Utah, and then moved back to Arizona to run for Graham County Sheriff in 1988. While serving as sheriff, he attended the FBI National Academy and graduated in 1992.

On December 13, 2014, Mack announced his candidacy for Navajo County Sheriff. In his announcement, he said, "We’re gonna make it a constitutional county and show everybody the blueprint for freedom. And there’s a lot more people running for other offices than me. I just said I’d run for sheriff. We’re going to give this one more try. The election is in 2016. I’m going to be moving there in spring of 2015 so I can start getting ready for this. You have about a year and a half to decide. And I’m dead serious about this. If I can move there, so can you." Mack did not make the ballot, and incumbent sheriff Kelly Clarke was re-elected.

=== Oath Keepers and Constitutional Sheriffs and Peace Officers Association ===
In 2011 Mack founded the Constitutional Sheriffs and Peace Officers Association (CSPOA). The organization has a mission similar to Oath Keepers, encouraging members to refuse to enforce laws that they believe are unconstitutional.

Mack is also on the board of Oath Keepers, a far-right patriot organisation known for its controversial presence during the Ferguson unrest and for supporting Cliven Bundy in his standoff against the federal government. In April, 2014, Mack asserted that as part of the citizen response to the Bundy standoff that the Oath Keepers were "...actually strategizing to put all the women up at the front. If they're gonna start shooting, it's going to be women that are gonna be televised all across the world getting shot by these rogue federal officers."

The Southern Poverty Law Center included both CSPOA and Oath Keepers on its list of 1,096 anti-government "patriot" groups active in 2013.

=== Campaigns for Congress ===
Mack ran as a Libertarian candidate for United States Senate in Arizona in 2006 against incumbent Jon Kyl, a Republican, but finished in the general election with 3% of the votes.

In 2012, Mack opposed 13-term Representative Lamar Smith, who introduced and sponsored the controversial Stop Online Piracy Act legislation, in the House election Republican primary for Texas's 21st Congressional district. The primary was held on May 29. Mack lost, receiving 14.78% (10,111) of the votes.

=== Bundy standoff ===
Mack was a lead figure in the 2014 Bundy standoff. Part of Mack's involvement was strategizing the standoff; Mack publicly commented that he had made plans to use women and children as human shields against the federal police as part of the group's tactics.

== Mack v. United States ==
Mack served as Graham County Sheriff from 1988 to 1996. In 1994 he was recruited by the National Rifle Association of America as a plaintiff in one of nine lawsuits against the Clinton administration over the Brady Handgun Violence Prevention Act.

Mack v. United States (later restyled to Printz v. United States), a lawsuit against the federal government which alleged that portions of the Act violated the United States Constitution, because they comprised a congressional action that compelled state officers to execute Federal law. These portions were interim provisions until a national instant background check system for gun purchasers could be implemented. In a 5–4 decision, the Supreme Court ruled that the provisions of the Brady Act in question were, in fact, unconstitutional.

== Political views ==
Mack is involved in the patriot movement through his role in the Oath Keepers organization and as founder of the Constitutional Sheriffs and Peace Officers Association (CSPOA).

Mack opposes all gun control laws, telling the program News21, "I studied what the Founding Fathers meant about the Second Amendment, the right to keep and bear arms, and the conclusion is inescapable. There's no way around it. Gun control in America is against the law."

=== Connections to white supremacist groups and movements ===
Mack's legal theories that a local sheriff can override federal authority derive from the white supremacist Posse comitatus movement, whose rhetoric he regularly references. To promote his legal theories and views, he is a regular guest speaker at organizations such as the John Birch Society and conspiracy theorist and white supremacist radio shows such as The Political Cesspool and The Alex Jones Show. Mack has also been a public supporter of white supremacists such as Randy Weaver and Cliven Bundy, even taking part in the anti-government actions at Bundy's ranch as an organizer and planner.

== Personal life ==
Mack was born in 1952 in Arizona. He is a member of the Church of Jesus Christ of Latter-day Saints and attended Brigham Young University, earning a degree in Latin American studies.

In April 2022, Richard Mack's adult son, Richard Solon Mack was charged with child sex abuse.

== Bibliography ==
Mack has authored several books relating to gun laws, ownership and the role that law enforcement should play in America:

- The County Sheriff: America's Last Hope
- The Proper Role of Law Enforcement
- From My Cold Dead Fingers: Why America Needs Guns with Timothy Robert Walters (1994) ISBN 096419354X
- The Naked Spy: His Mission Began the Day He Died (2005)
- The Magic of Gun Control (2011), ISBN 0984885609
- Are You a David? (2014), ISBN 0984885617
