= Oath Keepers =

American far-right anti-government militia

- Founder: Stewart Rhodes
- Leader: Bobby Kinch (National Director)
- Founded: March 2009; 17 years ago
- Dates active: 2009–present
- Active regions: United States
- Ideology: American nationalism Bircherism; Conservatism; Right-libertarianism; Trumpism (since 2016)
- Political position: Far-right
- Status: Active
- Size: 5,000–38,000

Oath Keepers is an American far-right anti-government militia whose leaders have been convicted of violently opposing the US government, including the transfer of presidential power as prescribed by the United States Constitution. It was incorporated in 2009 by founder Stewart Rhodes, a lawyer and former paratrooper. In 2023, Rhodes was sentenced to 18 years for seditious conspiracy in the January 6 United States Capitol attack, and another leader, Kelly Meggs, was sentenced to 12 years for the same crime. Three other members have pleaded guilty to this crime, and four other members have been convicted of it. By September 2021, twenty members had been indicted for federal crimes related to the Capitol attack. The organization was subpoenaed by the January 6th Committee in November 2021.

Research determined that two-thirds of the Oath Keepers are former military or law enforcement, and one tenth are active duty military or law enforcement. The group encourages its members to disobey orders which they believe would violate the US Constitution. Most research determined Oath Keeper membership to be approximately 5,000 members, while leaked data showed Oath Keepers' rosters claiming membership of 38,000. Oath Keepers were present wearing military fatigues during the 2014 and 2015 unrest in Ferguson, Missouri, when members armed with semi-automatic rifles roamed streets and rooftops.

Several organizations that monitor U.S. domestic terrorism and hate groups describe the Oath Keepers as a far-right extremist or radical group. In 2015, Mark Pitcavage of the Anti-Defamation League (ADL) described the group as "heavily armed extremists with a conspiratorial and anti-government mindset looking for potential showdowns with the government". The group is anti-government and extremist. Former SPLC fellow Mark Potok describes the group as "an anti-government group who believe in a wild set of conspiracy theories". The FBI describes the Oath Keepers as a "paramilitary organization" and a "large but loosely organized collection of militia who believe that the federal government has been co-opted by a shadowy conspiracy that is trying to strip American citizens of their rights." Some researchers have suggested the Oath Keepers' organizing principle is as a "profit-maximizing firm", rather than the hierarchical and close-knit "club" structure that similar groups show.

Writing in August 2025 for The New York Times, Alan Feuer said that the Oath Keepers "barely exists anymore. Its founder, Stewart Rhodes, no longer appears in public as often as he once did at far-right demonstrations or standoffs with the government." However, in November 2025, Rhodes told The Gateway Pundit that he would be relaunching and rebuilding the Oath Keepers.

== Organizational history ==
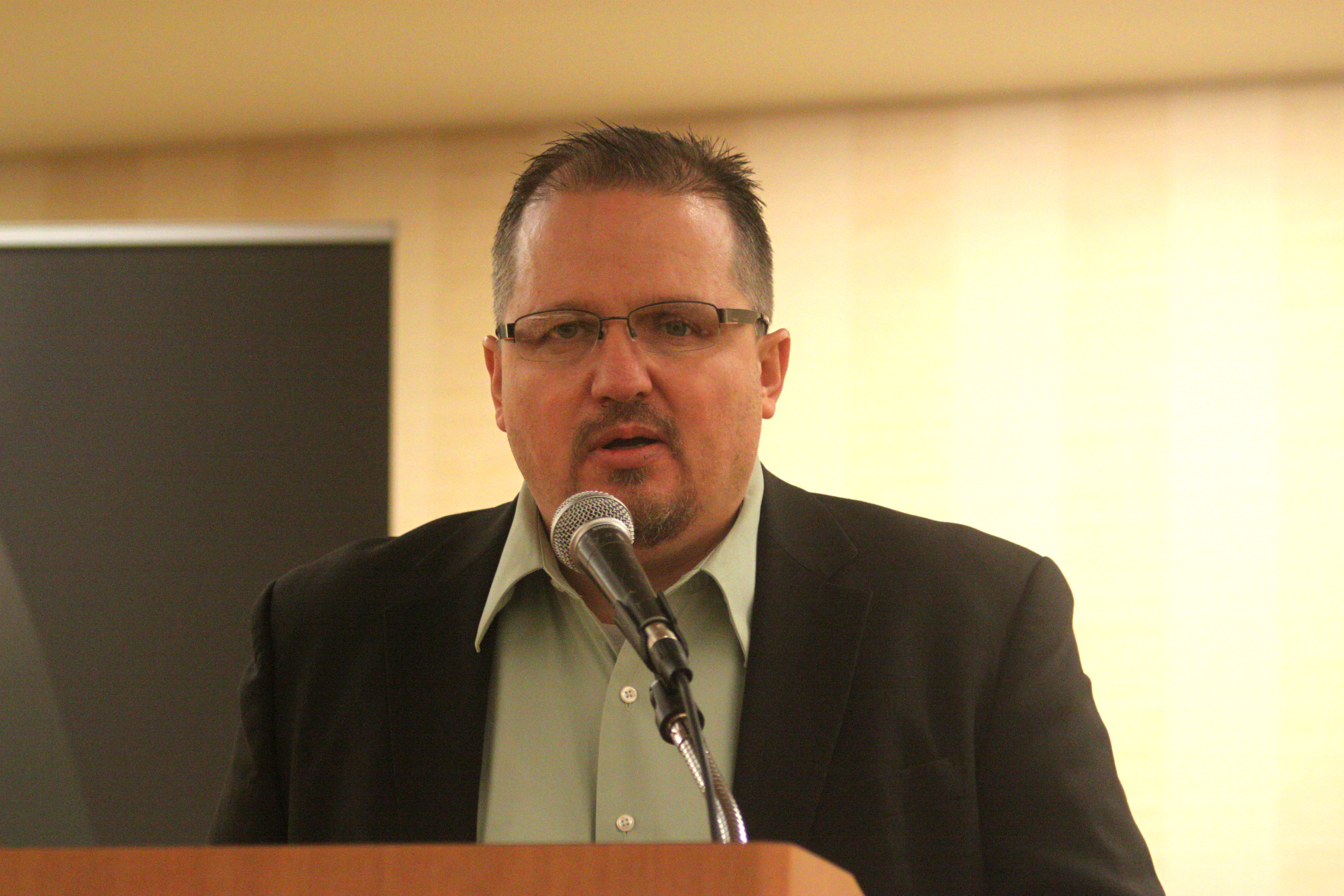
Founder Stewart Rhodes

The Oath Keepers has been identified as one of the "largest and most prominent organizations of the militia/patriot movement." Oath Keepers was founded in March 2009 by Elmer Stewart Rhodes, a Yale Law School graduate, former U.S. Army paratrooper, and former staffer for Republican Congressman Ron Paul. The Southern Poverty Law Center (SPLC) lists Rhodes as a known extremist.

Under Rhodes's leadership, Oath Keepers in 2013 instructed its members to form "Citizen Preservation" teams, including militias, to operate in communities across the country to defend Americans from government intentionally letting the country descend into chaos then declaring martial law and scrapping the constitution, stating that "They are preparing to control and contain us, and to shoot us, but not preparing to feed us."

On December 8, 2015, Rhodes was disbarred by the Montana Supreme Court for conduct violating the Montana Rules of Professional Conduct after refusing to respond to two bar grievances filed against him in the federal district court in Arizona.

Rhodes is reported to have taken inspiration from the notion that Adolf Hitler could have been stopped if German soldiers and police had refused to follow orders. Writing in S.W.A.T. Magazine in 2008, Rhodes asserts, "'It' (a full-blown totalitarian police state) cannot happen here if the majority of police and soldiers obey their oaths to defend the Constitution and refuse to enforce the unconstitutional edicts of the 'Leader'."

Some researchers have observed that the organization appears to be essentially profit-seeking in nature, regardless of the precise ideological positions it takes, which have varied in their specifics over the years. Former spokesperson for the Oath Keepers, Jason Van Tatenhove, has said of Stewart Rhodes and the Oath Keepers organization:

[Rhodes] knows that he can tap into this and make money off of it, and continue to [build] his own personal army [by] weaving these narratives and telling these stories and planting these seeds.

Other people close to Rhodes have also described profit as being the animating force of the organization, and his own children describe the Oath Keepers as a "grift".

Sedona Adams: ... Everything ran on donations. Sometimes [he'd] be on the phone saying, "Oh, well I need money. We need to create an emergency." And so they'd find something. That's why they started doing disaster relief.

It had had nothing to do with anything that they were set out to do, but they went into disaster relief because they had nothing else to do. They were like, "Oh, let's do some kind of a charity thing and make some money."

Dakota Adams: Anything that they could put up a GoFundMe for – anything that gets a GoFundMe link in front of the mailing list.

In an October 2020 interview, reporter Mike Giglio of The Atlantic stated that in the preceding years, the Oath Keepers regarded President Donald Trump as "someone in the White House that they fully support", in contrast to their skepticism of previous Republican administrations. He also said that in recent years Rhodes's statements had become more "radical" and that because of this some members of the group with military experience, concerned that the types of violence they had witnessed overseas might occur in the United States, left the group.

=== Nonprofit tax status ===
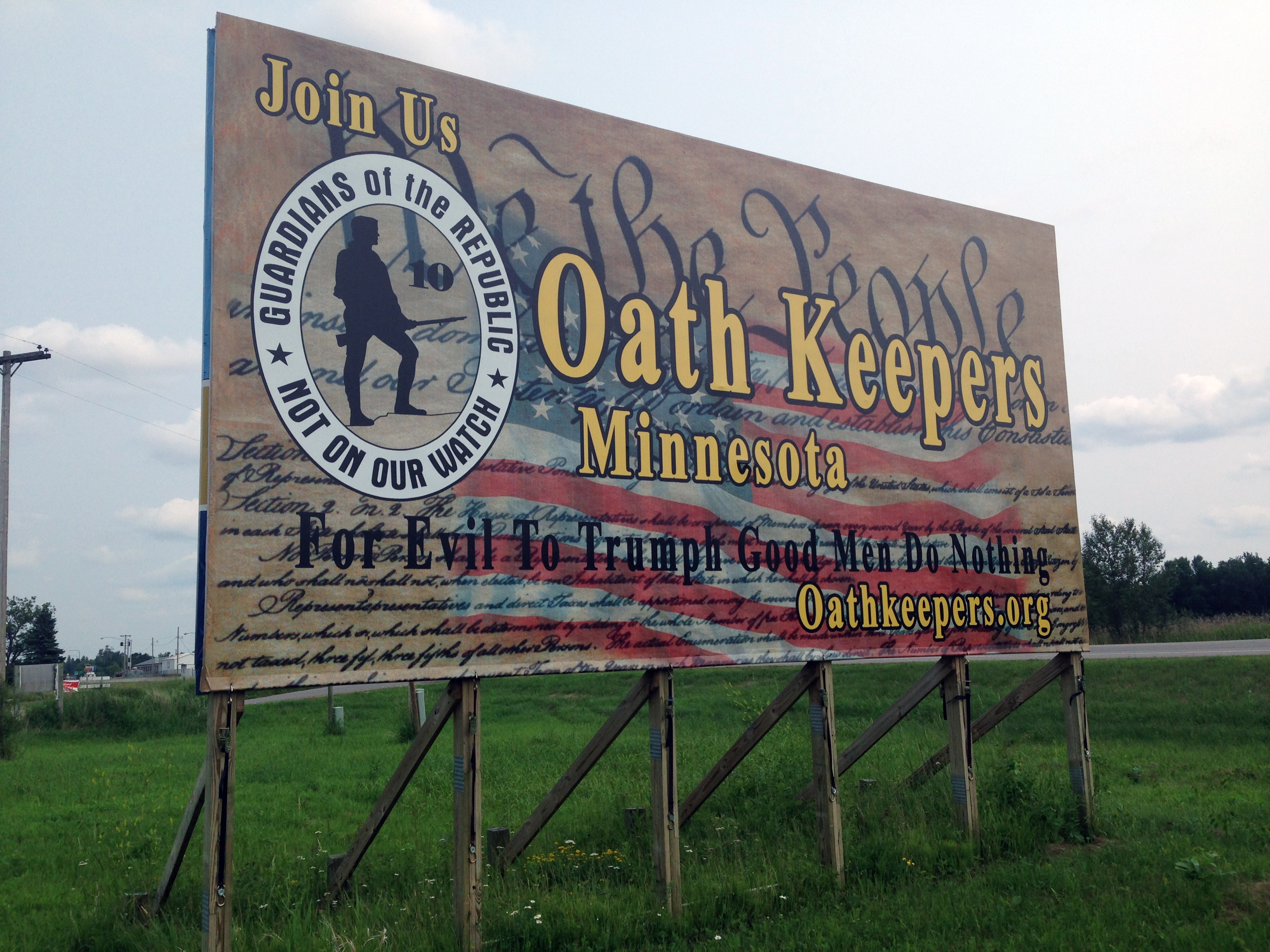
Billboard in Pine River, Minnesota in July 2015

In 2009, Oath Keepers was incorporated as a nonprofit organization in Nevada, but there is no record of it receiving tax-exempt status from the IRS, making any donations to the organization non-tax deductible. The IRS has recognized at least seven local chapters affiliated with the Oath Keepers as tax-exempt organizations. Chapters in Virginia, Indiana, and Pennsylvania received tax-exempt status between 2016 and 2018. The Southern Nevada Oath Keepers and Oath Keepers of Josephine County were also granted tax-exempt status.

In 2019, the IRS granted tax-exempt status to the Louisiana-based Oath Keepers Educational Foundation, whose stated purpose on filings is to "give veterans an opportunity for continued involvement in community service." Days before the January 6th United States Capitol attack, Oath Keepers' founder Stewart Rhodes appeared on a podcast and solicited charitable donations to the Oath Keepers Educational Foundation. Following a joint report from ISD and the Global Disinformation Index (GDI) on the funding operations of hate groups, an expert at the GDI submitted in their February 25, 2021, statement before the Subcommittee on National Security, International Development and Monetary Policy of the Committee on Financial Services U.S. House of Representatives said:

It can only be presumed that these funds, which listeners were notably able to deduct from their Federal taxes, went to transporting and lodging members of the group slated to participate in the ensuing riots.

=== Membership ===
The organization states that full membership is open to "currently serving military, reserves, National Guard, police, fire-fighters, other first responders (i.e. State Guard, Sheriff Posse/Auxiliary, Search & Rescue, EMT, other medical 1st responders, etc.) AND veterans/former members of those services," and that others who support the organization's mission can become associate members. There is however an annual membership fee that all members must pay, and researchers have observed that the organization will accept essentially any member who pays this fee.

Oath Keepers claimed 35,000 members in 2016, though researchers estimated the figure was about 5,000. In 2020, the ADL estimated there were between 1,000 and 3,000 members but said the group's influence extends well beyond that figure. In September 2021, hackers breached the group's servers to acquire a large cache of information, some of which was released to press outlets by Distributed Denial of Secrets, including the contact information of 38,000 apparent members. The cache included membership applications from active law enforcement officers, including some who sought to join after the 2021 United States Capitol attack. Dozens of elected officials were also found to be linked to the group.

A September 2022 report by the ADL said that, of 38,000 names on the Oath Keepers membership list, over 370 appear to be current employees in law enforcement agencies and over 100 are current military personnel.

==== Prominent members ====
In 2021 forty-eight state and local elected officials and ten sitting state lawmakers were members of the Oath Keepers group according to research by the Institute for Research and Education on Human Rights. The list included:

- Scott Baldwin (politician)
- Mike Clampitt
- Chad Christensen (Idaho politician)
- Don Dwyer
- David Eastman (politician)
- Mark Finchem
- Phil Jensen
- Keith Kidwell
- Wendy Rogers (politician)
- Jim Stalzer
- Steve Tarvin

===== Elmer Stewart Rhodes =====
Rhodes is the leader of the Oath Keepers and was convicted of seditious conspiracy and evidence tampering with regard to the January 6 United States Capitol attack, as of November 29, 2022.

===== Kellye SoRelle =====
SoRelle, from Granville, Texas, general attorney for the Oath Keepers, has claimed to be the group's temporary leader. She is the girlfriend of the group's leader, Stewart Rhodes, who is in prison. SoRelle is charged with tampering with documents for destroying and hiding potential evidence into the criminal investigation of the January 6 United States Capitol attack, entering Capitol grounds, and obstruction of an official proceeding. On June 16, 2023, a federal judge ruled that she was mentally incompetent to stand trial and was unable to understand the charges against her, and her trial was postponed indefinitely. She pleaded guilty on August 21, 2024 to one felony count of obstruction of justice and one misdemeanor count of breaching the Capitol grounds.

===== Bobby Kinch =====
It was not publicly known who led the Oath Keepers after Kelly SoRelle was ordered by U.S. District Judge Amit Mehta not to have contact with the far-right organization, until, on January 4, 2025, Robert “Bobby” Kinch was exposed as the "current national director" of the Oath Keepers since 2022. Kinch's role was revealed by John Williams, a vigilante mole and self-described “independent activist” who had successfully infiltrated the American Patriots Three Percent and rose to a leadership position there.

Bobby Kinch had been a veteran detective with the Las Vegas Municipal Police Department. In late 2013 fellow officers reported finding incendiary Facebook posts made by Kinch, one of which read “Let's just get this over! Race war, Civil, Revolution? Bring it! I'm about as fed up as a man (American, Christian, White, Heterosexual) can get! It's obviously coming to a boiling point! I say “FUCK IT”! I'm ready now! Sooner or later, I would say sooner than later!”

In 2014 an LVMPD internal investigation also unearthed a photo showing Kinch pointing a handgun at an image Barack Obama, then President of the United States.

Kinch voluntarily resigned from the LVMPD in 2016 after 23 years in the force and relocated to Duck Creek, Utah.

===== Charles A. Dyer =====
Dyer is a former U.S. Marine Corps sergeant who operated as a prominent advocate for the Oath Keepers, maintaining a popular YouTube channel and acting as a representative at Tea Party rallies. Known online as "July4Patriot," he made his anti-government videos during the administration of President Obama. As the criminal case against him developed he continued to make videos claiming that he was being targeted by law enforcement for his role as a "patriot."

He was charged in 2010 with child rape and illegal weapons possession. Dyer evaded authorities and a search ensued, followed by his capture ten days later. In 2012, he was convicted of raping his seven-year-old daughter. The Oath Keepers severed ties with Dyer after his conviction, and later denied a relationship with him.

===== Richard Mack =====
Mack is a former sheriff of Graham County, Arizona and a political activist, and is an Oath Keepers Board Member. He is known for his role in a successful lawsuit brought against the U.S. federal government which alleged that portions of the Brady Handgun Violence Prevention Act violated the U.S. Constitution. He is a former lobbyist for Gun Owners of America and a two-time candidate for U.S. Congress. Mack is also the founder of Constitutional Sheriffs and Peace Officers Association (CSPOA), and established the "County Sheriff Project" movement, both of whom reaffirm what they claim is the constitutional power to refuse to enforce federal laws.

According to the Southern Poverty Law Center (SPLC), Mack espouses a number of conspiracy and legal theories associated with the sovereign citizen and Posse Comitatus movements, chiefly, that sheriffs are the highest law enforcement authorities in the United States.

===== Wendy Rogers =====
Rogers is a state senator in Arizona, first elected in 2020. After members of Oath Keepers had been indicted for their alleged participation in the January 6 Capitol attack, Rogers stated on Twitter, "I am a member of the Oathkeepers and I really like their dedication to our Constitution and to our country," including a photo of her speaking to the Cottonwood, Arizona, chapter of the organization.

===== Kelly Meggs =====
Meggs led the Florida chapter and the "infamous 'stack' formation of Oath Keepers inside the Capitol" before entering Nancy Pelosi's office during the January 6 United States Capitol attack. He was found guilty of seditious conspiracy at the same trial as Stewart Rhodes in November 2022.

The Oath Keepers board of directors at one point also included Michele Imburgia, Rex H. McTyeire, John D. Shirley, Steven C. Homan, Jim Ayala, and Jay Stang.

== Participation in the January 6 United States Capitol attack ==
Three suspected members of Oath Keepers were federally indicted in January 2021 for conspiracy for planning their activities during the attack on the U.S. Capitol, with six more being added to the indictment in February. Eight to ten members of the group entered the Capitol wearing paramilitary gear, moving "in an organized and practiced fashion," according to the indictment. The group communicated with portable devices, with Watkins messaging to others, "We have a good group. We have about 30–40 of us. We are sticking together and sticking to the plan." Prosecutors alleged one member sent a text message to a member of the anti-government Three Percenters group days before the incursion, suggesting using a boat to ferry a "Quick Response Team" and heavy weapons across the Potomac River to other members already in the Capitol. Federal prosecutors were considering whether to pursue charges under the Racketeer Influenced and Corrupt Organizations Act, which is typically used to prosecute organized crime syndicates.

During the second impeachment trial of former President Trump, House impeachment managers presented an allegation that members of the Oath Keepers participated in efforts to interfere with the 2020 presidential election by discussing "a brazen plan to ferry 'heavy weapons' in a boat across the Potomac River into Washington and began training sessions 'for urban warfare, riot control and rescue operations' well before Election Day." Impeachment managers also said that an Oath Keeper member noted that they were "'awaiting direction' from Mr. Trump about how to handle the results of the vote in the days that followed the election," and that another alleged member, Jessica M. Watkins, wrote a text message saying, "[i]f Trump asks me to come, I will."

Prosecutors claimed in a March 2021 court filing that the group's founder and leader Stewart Rhodes was in contact with participants before, during and after the assault. Prosecutors said they recovered encrypted chat messages showing that "individuals, including those alleged to have conspired with [others], were actively planning to use force and violence." Under the title "DC OP: Jan 6 21," Rhodes stated in the chats that "quick reaction forces" outside Washington would be ready to respond if necessary and during the assault he directed members to rally on the southeast steps of the Capitol, from where they forcibly entered the building in a military-style "stack" formation.

Thomas Caldwell, who was present during the incident, was jailed on conspiracy charges days after the attack, though in March 2021 federal judge Amit Mehta released him to home confinement pending trial, finding there was no evidence he entered the Capitol or planned to. The FBI claimed that during the incursion Caldwell sent and received Facebook messages with "known and unknown Oath Keepers members," including sending the word "Inside," which received responses including, "All members are in the tunnels under capital seal them in. Turn on gas." Caldwell also allegedly received directions in navigating the Capitol, including "Tom all legislators are down in the Tunnels 3floors down" and "Go through back house chamber doors facing N left down hallway down steps."

Citing private Facebook messages, prosecutors stated in a March 2021 court filing that during the weeks preceding the attack, Meggs had contacted Proud Boys who he said could serve as a "force multiplier" and that he had "organized an alliance" among the Oath Keepers, Proud Boys and the Florida chapter of the Three Percenters.

In a June 2021 court filing arguing that a federal magistrate was wrong to release Oath Keeper member Jason Nolan from custody prior to his trial, prosecutors presented evidence he had stashed weapons in a Virginia hotel to arm a quick reaction force under the scenario described by Caldwell where Trump "calls us up as part of the militia to assist him inside DC." Nolan had been released after the magistrate ruled prosecutors had not established it was him who gave an anonymous interview to The Gateway Pundit the previous month describing his activities on January 6, but prosecutors presented evidence in their brief to assert it was Nolan.

The Wall Street Journal reported in June 2021 that since the attack on the Capitol the Oath Keepers was splintering amid "a cash squeeze, internal discord, social-media cutoff and isolation from the financial system."

Four members of the group—two from Florida, one from Indiana, and one from Alabama—have pleaded guilty to federal criminal charges arising from their roles in the attack on the Capitol; the four are cooperating with federal authorities.

On November 23, 2021, Stewart Rhodes and the Nevada-incorporated Oath Keepers entity were subpoenaed by the United States House Select Committee on the January 6 Attack. The committee's belief was that members of the organization have information about the preparations of the event, and what led to the ensuing violence.

CNN reported in May 2022 that top leaders of the group had been interviewed by the FBI and providing phones and digital files detailing how they had communicated with people in Trump's orbit. Investigators obtained encrypted messages with high-profile, right-wing political organizers. Rhodes had called an unnamed person on the evening of the attack, asking to speak directly to the president, urging the person on the phone to tell Trump he should call on groups like Oath Keepers to "forcefully oppose the transfer of power."

In February 2024, James Breheny, a regional organizer for the Oath Keepers, was sentenced to 36 months of probation. He had pleaded guilty in 2023 to a Capitol attack felony.

=== Seditious conspiracy charges ===
Twelve Oath Keepers have been charged with seditious conspiracy. Eleven were charged together in January 2022. William Todd Wilson was charged separately.

Three pled guilty:

- William Todd Wilson of Newton Grove, North Carolina, leader of the North Carolina Oath Keepers, pleaded guilty on May 4, 2022, to seditious conspiracy and obstruction of an official proceeding. On December 18, 2024, he was sentenced to one year of home detention and three years of probation.
- Joshua James, of Arab, Alabama, head of the Alabama chapter, provided security for right-wing figures such as Roger Stone on January 6. In March 2022, he pleaded guilty to seditious conspiracy and obstruction of official proceedings, and he agreed to cooperate with the government. On December 20, 2024, he was sentenced to three years of probation.
- Brian Ulrich from Guyton, Georgia, pleaded guilty on April 29, 2022 to seditious conspiracy and obstruction. On November 19, 2024, he was sentenced to three years of probation with six months of home detention and 120 hours of community service.

The remaining nine pleaded not guilty. Two trials were planned for them.

On July 29, 2022, Justice Department prosecutors wrote in a court filing, "[...] no government agent possessed actual authority to order the defendants' criminal actions, and, in any event, it would have been objectively unreasonable to rely on any such order." Thus, they asked the judge to prohibit the defense argument that the Oath Keepers were following President Trump's orders.

On May 5, 2023, the government filed a motion for upward departure, i.e., a longer sentence than guidelines recommend.

==== Trial of Rhodes, Meggs, Harrelson, Watkins, and Caldwell ====
On September 27, 2022, jury selection began. Each defendant faced up to 20 years in federal prison.

The five on trial were:

- Stewart Rhodes (R) founder of the Oath Keepers, has been charged with seditious conspiracy for forcibly resisting the peaceful transfer of power. On January 6, Rhodes urged Trump to fight to stay in power, and suggested the Oath Keepers, acting as militia, would support him if he invoked the Insurrection Act. Rhodes was convicted on the charge of seditious conspiracy.
- Kelly Meggs (R) founder of the Florida Oath Keepers from Dunnellon, Florida and husband to Oath Keeper Connie Meggs. See below.
- Kenneth Harrelson (R) Oath Keeper from Titusville, Florida was seen in a military "stack" formation and dressed in tactical gear. He was implicated in a Capitol breach. He has been indicted for seditious conspiracy.
- Jessica Watkins (R) Oath Keeper from Woodstock, Ohio was charged with conspiracy, obstruction, and sedition for her role in the military stack formation that broke into the Capitol yelling "They can't hold us."
- Thomas Caldwell (R) Oath Keeper from Berryville, Virginia, former Navy Lt. Commander who held a top-secret security clearance for decades and previously worked for the FBI.

Three former members testified against them:

- Graydon Young, Oath Keeper from Florida,
- Jason Dolan, Oath Keeper from Florida
- Laura Steele, Oath Keeper from North Carolina who is awaiting trial and is sister to Graydon Young.

When Rhodes testified in November, he claimed he'd intended only to convince Trump to invoke the Insurrection Act and that the Oath Keepers had gone to Washington to provide security for key Republican figures. He said the Oath Keepers had not planned to breach the Capitol nor to cause violence.

On November 29, 2022, Rhodes and Meggs were found guilty of seditious conspiracy; the other three were acquitted of the same charge. All five were found guilty of obstructing an official proceeding and aiding and abetting that action.

On May 25, 2023, Rhodes was sentenced to 18 years and Meggs was sentenced to 12 years.

On May 26, 2023, Watkins was sentenced to eight and a half years and Harrelson was sentenced to four years.

On January 10, 2025, Caldwell was sentenced to time served, having been found guilty on one count of tampering with evidence for deleting messages after the Capitol riot. Though he had originally been convicted of a second count of obstructing the joint session of Congress, this conviction had been dismissed following the Supreme Court case Fischer v. United States. He had been acquitted of all conspiracy charges.

==== Trial of Minuta, Hackett, Moerschel, and Vallejo ====
On January 23, 2023, Roberto Minuta, Joseph Hackett, David Moerschel, and Edward Vallejo were convicted of seditious conspiracy. They had been tried together. On June 1, Minuta was sentenced to 54 months in prison and Vallejo to 36 months. On June 2, Moerschel was sentenced to 36 months in prison and Hackett 42 months. All four were given another 36 months of supervised release after their respective prison terms.

=== Other charges ===
==== Trial of Connie Meggs ====
Connie Meggs, an Oath Keeper from Dunnellon, Florida, and wife of Kelly Meggs, was charged with conspiring to obstruct an official proceeding, aiding and abetting obstruction, conspiracy, and entering restricted grounds. On March 20, 2023, she was found guilty by a jury in Washington, D.C., of conspiracy to obstruct an official proceeding and other felony charges.

In August 2023, Connie Meggs was sentenced to 15 months in prison and 36 months of supervised release.

==== Trial of Michael Greene ====
Greene was a paid contractor who provided security to the Oath Keepers. He claimed not to be a member of the group. In May 2023, he was convicted of trespassing (a misdemeanor) related to the attack on the Capitol. On July 21, he was sentenced to probation and community service.

==== Trial of Donovan Crowl and James Beeks ====
On July 12, 2023, Donovan Crowl was convicted of conspiracy and civil disorder, following a stipulated bench trial. His co-defendant, James D. Beeks, was acquitted.

=== Pardons and commutations ===
Upon Trump's inauguration on January 20, 2025, he granted "a full, complete and unconditional pardon" to everyone convicted of offenses related to the Capitol attack, who by then numbered over a thousand. The only exceptions were nine Oath Keepers (Rhodes, Meggs, Harrelson, Caldwell, Watkins, Minuta, Vallejo, Moerschel, and Hackett) and five Proud Boys (Nordean, Biggs, Rehl, Pezzola, and Bertino). These 14 people had their sentences commuted to "time served," allowing them to be released from prison immediately, but their convictions stood.

Caldwell had already been sentenced to time served when Trump issued the order.

On January 24, the U.S. district court for the District of Columbia gave those Oath Keepers (excepting Caldwell) new conditions on their supervised release: they need court permission to enter Washington, D.C. and further specific permission to enter Capitol Square or the Capitol Building.

== Other antigovernment activities ==
=== Federal land disputes ===
==== Bundy Ranch standoff, 2014 ====
In 2014, armed Oath Keepers were present at the Bundy Ranch standoff, after agents of the Bureau of Land Management (BLM) seized cattle from a rancher who was illegally grazing stock on federal land in Clark County, Nevada.

==== Sugar Pine Mine standoff, 2015 ====
In 2015, armed Oath Keepers in the Pacific Northwest attended two disputes between gold miners and federal authorities. In April they gathered in Medford, Oregon, at the request of the owners of the Sugar Pine Mine near Galice, after the owners were ordered to stop working the mine by the Bureau of Land Management. In August, they patrolled the White Hope Mine in the Helena National Forest, about 20 miles from Lincoln, Montana; the U.S. Forest Service said the miners had engaged in illegal construction and tree-felling.

==== Crissy Field, 2017 ====
In August 2017, a permit was issued by the National Park Service for the August 26 use of Crissy Field to hold a rally by a group calling itself 'Patriot Prayer'. The group's spokesman, Joey Gibson, announced that the Oath Keepers would be providing event security, confirmed to the San Francisco Examiner on August 18 by Stewart Rhodes.

=== Anti-Hillary Clinton threats, 2016 ===
An article posted to the organization's official website on April 14, 2016, stated that if Hillary Clinton won the 2016 United States presidential election, "the result would probably be outright civil war in the U.S." Later in 2016, Stewart Rhodes called on members to visit polling places incognito to "hunt down" and document suspected voter fraud.

=== Threat of violence towards Oregon State Capitol, 2019 ===
In June 2019, Oregon Governor Kate Brown sent the Oregon State Police to bring 11 absent Republican state senators back to the State Capitol. The Republican state senators had gone into hiding to prevent a vote on a cap-and-trade proposal aimed at lowering greenhouse gas emissions by 2050 in order to combat climate change. The Oath Keepers reacted on June 20, 2019, by stating: "Gov. Brown, you want a civil war, because this is how you get a civil war". On June 22, 2019, a session of the Oregon Senate was canceled when the State Capitol was closed due to a warning from the Oregon state police of a "possible militia threat".

== Other armed protest activities ==
=== Military recruitment center presence, 2015 ===
Following the 2015 Chattanooga shootings at a strip mall military recruitment center and a naval operational support center in Tennessee, Oath Keepers and other militia groups began organizing armed gatherings outside of recruiting centers in several states, with the stated objective of providing protection to service members, who were barred from carrying weapons while on duty in civilian recruitment centers. In response, the Army Command Operations Center Security Division issued a letter ordering soldiers not to interact with or acknowledge armed civilians outside of recruitment centers, and that "If questioned by these alleged concerned citizens, be polite, professional and terminate the conversation immediately and report the incident to local law enforcement," noting that the issuing officer is "sure the citizens mean well, but we cannot assume this in every case and we do not want to advocate this behavior."

=== Kim Davis refusal to issue same-sex marriage licenses, 2015 ===
Kim Davis is a former county clerk for Rowan County, Kentucky, who gained international attention in August 2015 when she defied a U.S. federal court order to issue marriage licenses to same-sex couples. On September 10, 2015, the Oath Keepers announced that they would travel to Rowan County, to prevent her arrest and jailing should she be held in contempt a second time for violating a court order prohibiting her from interfering with marriage licensing in her office. The group aimed to block enforcement of contempt of court rulings against Davis, and said, "If the sheriff, who should be interceding, is not going to do his job and the governor is not going to do the governor's job of interceding, then we'll do it." The Oath Keepers also criticized the judge in the case, David Bunning, saying "this judge needs to be put on notice that his behavior is not going to be accepted and we'll be there to stop it and intercede ourselves if we have to."

The following day, members were advised that Davis's legal team, acting on her behalf, had declined their offer to provide her a "security detail." The Oath Keepers issued a statement saying that while members were still welcome to visit Rowan County, it would only be unofficial.

=== Stoneman Douglas High School shooting, 2018 ===
In February 2018, soon after the Stoneman Douglas High School shooting in Parkland, Florida, Oath Keepers founder Rhodes publicly called upon "tens of thousands" of the group's members to form militias to protect US schools and colleges. He posted on the Oath Keepers' website in what he termed a National Call to Action: "Oath Keepers, in the wake of the horrific attack ... it is time to step up nationwide and defend our schools against the threat of mass murder. Enough is enough".

== Political positions ==
The Oath Keepers' bylaws state that, "No person who advocates, or has been or is a member, or associated with, any organization, formal or informal, that advocates discrimination, violence, or hatred toward any person based upon their race, nationality, creed, or color, shall be entitled to be a member or associate member."

Founder Stewart Rhodes, who has said he is one-quarter Mexican, has disavowed racism and white supremacist ideology on his blog. He has likened the far-right extremist occupation of the Malheur National Wildlife Refuge to the Civil Rights Movement in the United States, saying, "Ammon Bundy's occupation of an empty building is essentially the same as civil-disobedience sit-ins that the political left has engaged in for decades, from anti-war and civil rights protesters in the 60s and 70s."

Board member Richard Mack has said that despite the contributing role of southern U.S. sheriffs in preserving White supremacy, "constitutional sheriffs" could have protected civil rights icon Rosa Parks.

In 2015, the Oathkeepers website republished an opinion piece by Brandon Smith claiming that, "[...]there is no such thing as white privilege or male privilege: In reality, there is only institutionalized 'privilege' for victim-status groups. There is no privilege for whites, males, white males or straight white males. ... People should not feel guilty for being born the way they are, and this includes us 'white male devils.'"

On June 10, 2017, the Oath Keepers participated in providing security in a "March Against Sharia," which were rallies coordinated by ACT for America.

=== Opposition to Black Lives Matter and antifa ===
In late November 2014, during the unrest in Ferguson, the Oath Keepers put out a national request to its members to help in the city after the grand jury decision was released in the case of the shooting of Michael Brown. About the perceived failure of the government's response to the unrest, the organization's founder, Stewart Rhodes, told the St. Louis Post-Dispatch, "We thought they were going to do it right this time, but when Monday rolled around and they didn't park the National Guard at these businesses, that's when we said we have got to do something." On December 2, 2014, volunteer security guards associated with the Oath Keepers kept armed watch on Ferguson rooftops, ignoring a police order to stop, based on a city ordinance relating to security personnel. According to a member, the ordinance only applied to security employees, while the Oath Keepers were volunteers.

In August 2015, four members of the group appeared again on the streets of Ferguson, following peaceful street demonstrations on the anniversary of Brown's shooting. According to an article in The Washington Post, "The men—all of them white and heavily armed—said they were in the area to protect someone who worked for the Web site InfoWars, which is affiliated with talk-radio conspiracy theorist and self-described 'thought criminal against Big Brother' Alex Jones." The Oath Keepers claimed to be on the side of the protestors. St. Louis County Police Chief Jon Belmar told the newspaper that the Oath Keepers' "presence was both unnecessary and inflammatory."

One Ferguson activist, Ryan Herring, described their presence as intimidating and frightening and criticized the Oath Keepers for their suggestion that protestors should use their legal right to carry firearms by saying that this would have increased the tension with the police and would particularly have put Black prosetors at even greater risk of police violence than they were already under. Sam Andrews, a member of the Oath Keepers, contended that the protestors calmed down when the Oath Keepers arrived at the protest.

St. Louis County police officer Dan Page was relieved of duty in 2014 after pushing and threatening with arrest CNN journalist Don Lemon on live television in Ferguson. Subsequently, an hour-long videotaped speech made by Page to an Oath Keepers meeting was found on YouTube. In the speech, Page boasted, "I'm also a killer. I've killed a lot, and if I need to I'll kill a whole bunch more." Page also denounced hate crime laws, disparaged Muslims, and espoused Barack Obama citizenship conspiracy theories (Page referred to Obama as "that illegal alien claiming to be president"). The YouTube video contained a disclaimer stating that Page's opinions did not reflect those of the local chapter or national organization.

The group's activities in Ferguson led to them being labeled "vigilantes" by some journalists.

Mike Giglio of The Atlantic reported that at a July 2020 meeting at a Veterans of Foreign Wars hall in Rutherford County, Tennessee, founder Rhodes, speaking of the events of the racial unrest in the United States that year, said that antifa and other protesters "are insurrectionists, and we have to suppress that insurrection" and that "eventually they're going to be using IEDs" and consequently "us old vets and younger ones are going to end up having to kill these young kids and they're going to die believing they were fighting Nazis."

After three people were killed in protests in Portland, Oregon, and Kenosha, Wisconsin, Oath Keepers founder Stewart Rhodes tweeted, "The first shot [of a civil war] has been fired brother." Following the deaths during protests in Kenosha and the George Floyd protests in Portland, Oregon, Rhodes referred to antifa and Black Lives Matter protestors as attempting an "open Communist insurrection". Stating that they were engaged in civil war he asked President Trump to declare a nationwide insurrection to be opposed by a federalized National Guard to engage with the protestors. If Trump failed to do this Rhodes said that the Oath Keepers would. Twitter responded by banning his and the Oath Keepers' accounts.

== Reception ==
Larry Keller wrote in the Southern Poverty Law Center's (SPLC's) 2009 report The Second Wave: Return of the Militias that the Oath Keepers "may be a particularly worrisome example of the Patriot revival." Keller described Richard Mack, an Oath Keeper, as a "longtime militia hero" and quoted him as having said, "The greatest threat we face today is not terrorists; it is our federal government. ... One of the best and easiest solutions is to depend on local officials, especially the sheriff, to stand against federal intervention and federal criminality." Mack, a former sheriff, responded by denying the claims, saying, "I have had no contact with any militia group and have never been a member of any militia." Mark Potok, a senior fellow at the SPLC, said in an interview that the group has no history of political violence, but that, "The core ideas of these groups relate to the fear that elites in this country and around the world are slowly and steadily and nefariously moving us towards a one-world government, the so-called New World Order."

In 2009, the Anti-Defamation League (ADL) wrote in a report that, "The 'orders' the Oath Keepers refuse [to obey] reveal their extreme conspiratorial mindset, because the 'orders' are not instructions ever likely to be actually handed down by Obama or his officials; instead, they are reflective of the anti-government conspiracy theories embraced by the extreme right."

Quoting the Las Vegas Review-Journal in 2009, paleoconservative political commentator Pat Buchanan wrote for MSNBC: "Oath Keepers, depending on where one stands, are either strident defenders of liberty or dangerous peddlers of paranoia." Buchanan himself concluded that "America was once their country. They sense they are losing it. And they are right."

Fox News Radio host Lou Dobbs spoke with founder Stewart Rhodes on his radio show in 2009 and criticized the SPLC for "perpetuating the same kind of intolerance it claims to condemn." On Hardball with Chris Matthews, Matthews questioned Rhodes about his "vigilante group" and on his "strange view of the world."

Protesters have accused the group of racism, especially after groups of white members armed with rifles congregated in Ferguson, Missouri during demonstrations related to police brutality in 2014.

== See also ==
- Constitutional Sheriffs and Peace Officers Association
- List of militia organizations in the United States
