= List of acts of the 112th United States Congress =

The acts of the 112th United States Congress includes all Acts of Congress and ratified treaties by the 112th United States Congress, which lasts from January 3, 2011, to January 3, 2013.

Acts include public and private laws, which are enacted after being passed by Congress and signed by the President, however if the President vetoes a bill it can still be enacted by a two-thirds vote in both houses. The Senate alone considers treaties, which are ratified by a two-thirds vote.

The 112th Congress, which was divided between a Democratic Senate and Republican House, passed only 283 acts. In terms of legislation enacted, it was the least productive Congress since modern records began in 1947, passing far fewer than the 906 passed by the 80th Congress (the "Do-nothing Congress").

== Summary of actions ==
In this Congress, all of the statutes have been promulgated (signed) by President Barack Obama. None have been enacted by Congress over the President's veto.

== Public laws ==
| Public law number | Date of enactment | Short title | Description |
|---|---|---|---|
| 112-1 | January 31, 2011 | (No short title) | Prolonged the extensions under Pub. L. 111–251 (text) (PDF) to May 31, 2011. |
| 112-2 | February 17, 2011 | (No short title) | Named a courthouse in Yuma, Arizona after John M. Roll. |
| 112-3 | February 25, 2011 | FISA Sunsets Extension Act of 2011 | Extended wiretapping permissions in the USA PATRIOT Improvement and Reauthorization Act of 2005 and the "lone wolf" provision of the Intelligence Reform and Terrorism Prevention Act of 2004 until May 27, 2011. |
| 112-4 | March 2, 2011 | Further Continuing Appropriations Amendments, 2011 | Made further continuing appropriations for fiscal year 2011. (Extending Pub. L. 111–242 (text) (PDF), the Continuing Appropriations Act, 2011) |
| 112-5 | March 4, 2011 | Surface Transportation Extension Act of 2011 | Extended various Federal-aid programs funded out of the Highway Trust Fund pending enactment of a multiyear law reauthorizing such programs. (Extending Pub. L. 111–147 (text) (PDF), the Surface Transportation Extension Act of 2010). |
| 112-6 | March 18, 2011 | Additional Continuing Appropriations Amendments, 2011 | Made new continuing appropriations for fiscal year 2011. (Extending Pub. L. 111–242 (text) (PDF), the Continuing Appropriations Act, 2011, and Pub. L. 112–4 (text) (PDF), Further Continuing Appropriations Amendments, 2011) |
| 112-7 | March 31, 2011 | Airport and Airway Extension Act of 2011 | Amended the Internal Revenue Code to extend the funding and expenditure authority of the Airport and Airway Trust Fund, and Title 49, United States Code, to extend the Airport Improvement Program. |
| 112-8 | April 9, 2011 | Further Additional Continuing Appropriations Amendments, 2011 | Making appropriations for the Department of Defense for the fiscal year ending September 30, 2011. (Extending Pub. L. 111–242 (text) (PDF), the Continuing Appropriations Act, 2011, Pub. L. 112–4 (text) (PDF), Further Continuing Appropriations Amendments, 2011, and Pub. L. 112–6 (text) (PDF), Additional Continuing Appropriations Amendments, 2011.) |
| 112-9 | April 13, 2011 | Comprehensive 1099 Taxpayer Protection and Repayment of Exchange Subsidy Overpayments Act of 2011 | Repealed the increased requirements for the reporting of certain payment to the Internal Revenue Service and increased certain health care-related tax credits. |
| 112-10 | April 15, 2011 | Department of Defense and Full-Year Continuing Appropriations Act, 2011 | 2011 federal budget for fiscal year 2011 |
| 112-11 | April 25, 2011 | (No short title) | Named a federal building and courthouse in Martinsburg, West Virginia after W. Craig Broadwater. |
| 112-12 | April 25, 2011 | (No short title) | Provided for the appointment of Stephen M. Case as a citizen regent of the board of regents of the Smithsonian Institution. |
| 112-13 | May 12, 2011 | (No short title) | Extend the termination date for the Ronald Reagan Centennial Commission to late 2011. (Amending Pub. L. 111–25 (text) (PDF), the Ronald Reagan Centennial Commission Act) |
| 112-14 | May 26, 2011 | PATRIOT Sunsets Extension Act of 2011 | Extended wiretapping permissions in the USA PATRIOT Improvement and Reauthorization Act of 2005 and the "lone wolf" provision of the Intelligence Reform and Terrorism Prevention Act of 2004 until June 1, 2015. |
| 112-15 | May 31, 2011 | (No short title) | Named a Postal Service facility in Inverness, California after Jake Robert Velloza. |
| 112-16 | May 31, 2011 | Airport and Airway Extension Act of 2011, Part II | Extended provisions of the Airport Improvement Program the funding, and expenditure authorities of the Airport and Airway Trust Fund through various dates in June to October 2011. |
| 112-17 | June 1, 2011 | Small Business Additional Temporary Extension Act of 2011 | Further expanded programs extended by Pub. L. 112–1 (text) (PDF) and required all SBIR or STTR funds to be awarded pursuant to competitive and merit-based selection procedures. |
| 112-18 | June 8, 2011 | Intelligence Authorization Act for Fiscal Year 2011 | Made appropriations for fiscal year 2011 for intelligence and intelligence-related activities, the Community Management Account, and the Central Intelligence Agency Retirement and Disability System, as well as establishing various intelligence requirements; expressed congress' sense that railway transportation security should be prioritized; commended intelligence community members for their role in the death of Osama bin Laden. |
| 112-19 | June 24, 2011 | (No short title) | Provided for the reappointment of Shirley Ann Jackson as a citizen regent of the board of regents of the Smithsonian Institution. |
| 112-20 | June 24, 2011 | (No short title) | Provided for the reappointment of Robert P. Kogod as a citizen regent of the board of regents of the Smithsonian Institution. |
| 112-21 | June 29, 2011 | Airport and Airway Extension Act of 2011, Part III | Amended the Internal Revenue Code of 1986 to extend the funding and expenditure authority of the Airport and Airway Trust Fund, to amend Title 49, United States Code, to extend the Airport Improvement Program, and for other purposes. |
| 112-22 | June 29, 2011 | (No short title) | Named a Postal Service facility in Rootstown, Ohio after Marine Sgt. Jeremy E. Murray. |
| 112-23 | June 29, 2011 | (No short title) | Named a Postal Service facility in Cary, Mississippi after Spencer Byrd Powers, Jr. |
| 112-24 | July 26, 2011 | (No short title) | Extended the term of Robert Mueller, the incumbent Director of the Federal Bureau of Investigation. |
| 112-25 | August 2, 2011 | Budget Control Act of 2011 | Resolved the United States debt ceiling crisis by allowing for the raising of the ceiling. |
| 112-26 | August 3, 2011 | Restoring GI Bill Fairness Act of 2011 | Temporarily preserved higher rates for tuition and fees for programs of education at non-public institutions of higher learning pursued by individuals enrolled in the Post-9/11 Educational Assistance Program of the Department of Veterans Affairs before the enactment of the Post-9/11 Veterans Educational Assistance Improvements Act of 2010, and for other purposes. |
| 112-27 | August 5, 2011 | Airport and Airway Extension Act of 2011, Part IV | Amended the Internal Revenue Code of 1986 to extend the funding and expenditure authority of the Airport and Airway Trust Fund, to amend title 49, United States Code, to extend the Airport Improvement Program, and for other purposes. |
| 112-28 | August 12, 2011 | (No short title) | To provide the Consumer Product Safety Commission with greater authority and discretion in enforcing the consumer product safety laws, and for other purposes. |
| 112-29 | September 16, 2011 | Leahy-Smith America Invents Act | To amend title 35, United States Code, to provide for patent reform. |
| 112-30 | September 16, 2011 | Surface and Air Transportation Programs Extension Act of 2011 | Made appropriations and various transportation-related provisions until various dates in 2012 |
| 112-31 | September 23, 2011 | (No short title) | Named a federal courthouse in Jefferson City, Missouri after Christopher S. Bond. |
| 112-32 | September 30, 2011 | Combating Autism Reauthorization Act of 2011 | Reauthorized programs under the Combating Autism Act. |
| 112-33 | September 30, 2011 | Continuing Appropriations Act, 2012 | Extended a number of provisions until October 4, 2011, and made a number of appropriations, primarily for the Departments of Defense and Homeland Security. |
| 112-34 | September 30, 2011 | Child and Family Services Improvement and Innovation Act | Made various changes and extensions to child and family services. |
| 112-35 | September 30, 2011 | Short-Term TANF Extension Act | Made extensions and appropriations related to Temporary Assistance for Needy Families. |
| 112-36 | October 5, 2011 | Continuing Appropriations Act, 2012 | Perpetuated the provisions of Public Law 112-33 until November 18, 2011. |
| 112-37 | October 5, 2011 | Veterans Health Care Facilities Capital Improvement Act of 2011 | Made appropriations for facilities construction or leases, established requirements for funding requests, named a facility in Craig, Colorado after William Edward Adams, and extended some authorities and programs until 2018 or beyond. |
| 112-38 | October 12, 2011 | (No short title) | Named a Postal Service facility in Schertz, Texas after the local veterans. |
| 112-39 | October 12, 2011 | (No short title) | Named a Postal Service facility in Lubbock, Texas after Chris Davis. |
| 112-40 | October 21, 2011 | Trade Adjustment Assistance Extension Act of 2011 | Extended the Generalized System of Preferences and raised the ad valorem customs user fee |
| 112-41 | October 21, 2011 | United States-Korea Free Trade Agreement Implementation Act | Ratified the South Korea–United States Free Trade Agreement |
| 112-42 | October 21, 2011 | United States-Colombia Trade Promotion Agreement Implementation Act | Ratified the United States–Colombia Free Trade Agreement |
| 112-43 | October 21, 2011 | United States-Panama Trade Promotion Agreement Implementation Act | Ratified the Panama–United States Trade Promotion Agreement |
| 112-44 | October 21, 2011 | United States Parole Commission Extension Act of 2011 | Extended the United States Parole Commission for two years and demanded reports on various statistics. |
| 112-45 | November 7, 2011 | (No short title) | Solved a jurisdiction dispute between the Bureau of Reclamation and the Forest Service over the C.C. Cragin Dam and Reservoir. |
| 112-46 | November 7, 2011 | Ski Area Recreational Opportunity Enhancement Act of 2011 | Amended the National Forest Ski Area Permit Act of 1986 with various changes and clarifications. |
| 112-47 | November 7, 2011 | (No short title) | Named a Postal Service facility in Barrigada, Guam after John Pangelinan Gerber. |
| 112-48 | November 7, 2011 | (No short title) | Named a Postal Service facility in Pasadena, California after Oliver Goodall. |
| 112-49 | November 7, 2011 | (No short title) | Named a Postal Service facility in Sagamore Beach, Massachusetts after Matthew A. Pucino. |
| 112-50 | November 7, 2011 | (No short title) | Named a Postal Service facility in Honolulu, Hawaii after Cecil Heftel. |
| 112-51 | November 9, 2011 | Removal Clarification Act of 2011 | Made adjustments and extensions to the rules for removal of actions to federal district courts. |
| 112-52 | November 9, 2011 | (No short title) | Allowed for prepayment of repayment contracts between the federal government and the Uintah Water Conservancy District. |
| 112-53 | November 9, 2011 | Veterans' Compensation Cost-of-Living Adjustment Act of 2011 | Increased the rates of various veterans compensations (as of December 2011) by the same amount as increases under title II (Old Age, Survivors and Disability Insurance) of the Social Security Act. |
| 112-54 | November 12, 2011 | Asia-Pacific Economic Cooperation Business Travel Cards Act of 2011 | Enabled the Secretary of Homeland Security to issue APEC Business Travel Cards and collect fees for doing so. |
| 112-55 | November 18, 2011 | Consolidated and Further Continuing Appropriations Act, 2012 | Made FY 2012 for various departments and agencies by consolidating three bills: Agriculture, Rural Development, FDA and Related Agencies; Commerce, Justice, Science and Related Agencies; and Transportation, HUD and Related Agencies. Funding under the Continuing Appropriations Act, 2012 was extended for other departments until December 16, 2011. |
| 112-56 | November 21, 2011 | (No short title) | Repealed a 3% withholding on certain payments made to vendors by government entities, provided job-training aid for veterans, and modified excluded social security income from calculation of modified adjusted gross income for purposes of determining eligibility for certain healthcare-related programs |
| 112-57 | November 21, 2011 | Kate Puzey Peace Corps Volunteer Protection Act of 2011 | Required the Peace Corp to take steps to prevent sexual assault in the program and provide assistance to sexual assault victims. |
| 112-58 | November 23, 2011 | (No short title) | Amended the Immigration and Nationality Act to toll, during active-duty service abroad in the Armed Forces, the 90-day periods of time for an alien spouse or petitioning spouse to file a petition and appear for an interview to remove the conditional basis for permanent resident status. |
| 112-59 | November 23, 2011 | (No short title) | Granted the Congressional Gold Medal to the Montford Point Marines. |
| 112-60 | November 23, 2011 | (No short title) | Named a Postal Service facility in Woburn, Massachusetts after Officer John Maguire. |
| 112-61 | November 29, 2011 | America's Cup Act of 2011 | Made provisions related to the use of ports and waters around them, beginning in 2011, for the 2013 America's Cup. |
| 112-62 | November 29, 2011 | Appeal Time Clarification Act of 2011 | Clarified the meaning of "the United States or an officer or agency thereof" with respect to the extended 60-day period to file appeals in federal court. |
| 112-63 | December 7, 2011 | Federal Courts Jurisdiction and Venue Clarification Act of 2011 | Made various changes to removal of case, jurisdiction, and transfer of case venues for federal courts. |
| 112-64 | December 13, 2011 | National Guard and Reservist Debt Relief Extension Act of 2011 | Extended exemptions under the National Guard and Reservists Debt Relief Act of 2008. |
| 112-65 | December 13, 2011 | (No short title) | Made eligibility-related changes to the Federal Charter of the Blue Star Mothers of America. |
| 112-66 | December 13, 2011 | (No short title) | Made minor changes to the Federal Charter of the American Legion regarding its relation to its state and territorial organizations. |
| 112-67 | December 16, 2011 | (No short title) | Extended provisions under the Continuing Appropriations Act, 2012 until December 17. |
| 112-68 | December 17, 2011 | (No short title) | Further extended the same provisions as Public Law 112-67 until December 23. |
| 112-69 | December 19, 2011 | Fort Pulaski National Monument Lease Authorization Act | Authorised land from the Fort Pulaski National Monument to be leased to the Savannah Bar Pilots Association and set conditions for it. |
| 112-70 | December 19, 2011 | Box Elder Utah Land Conveyance Act | Directed for some National Forest System land in Utah to be conveyed to the town of Mantua, Utah. |
| 112-71 | December 19, 2011 | (No short title) | Gave congressional consent to state legislation related to the Bi-State Development Agency. |
| 112-72 | December 20, 2011 | Hoover Power Allocation Act of 2011 | Amended the Hoover Power Plant Act of 1984 regarding the allocation of the energy produced at the Dam. |
| 112-73 | December 20, 2011 | Civilian Service Recognition Act of 2011 | Authorized the gift of American flags to non-military employees who die in service. |
| 112-74 | December 20, 2011 | Consolidated Appropriations Act, 2012 | Final part of the 2012 United States federal budget, covering amongst others the Departments of Defense, Education, Health and Human Services, Homeland Security, Labor, State, the Interior, the Treasury. |
| 112-75 | December 23, 2011 | United States Commission on International Religious Freedom Reform and Reauthorization Act of 2011 | Applied various reforms and appropriations to the United States Commission on International Religious Freedom as well as extending its mandate until 2014. |
| 112-76 | December 23, 2011 | Fallen Heroes of 9/11 Act | Required that Congressional Gold Medals in honor be awarded to the victims of the 9/11 attacks, and allowed for the production and sales of bronze duplicates. |
| 112-77 | December 23, 2011 | Disaster Relief Appropriations Act, 2012 | Makes disaster relief appropriations and for redeterminations of eligibility for Social Security. |
| 112-78 | December 23, 2011 | Temporary Payroll Tax Cut Continuation Act of 2011 | Omnibus act that extended payroll tax holidays, unemployment compensation and Medicare physician payment, and covered issues related to the Keystone XL pipeline as well as minor aspects of Congressional process. |
| 112-79 | December 23, 2011 | Sugar Loaf Fire Protection District Land Exchange Act of 2011 | Required and set various conditions to a land exchange between the Sugar Loaf Fire Protection District and the Forest Service in the Arapaho and Roosevelt National Forests. |
| 112-80 | December 23, 2011 | (No short title) | Extended the authority of the United States Postal Service to issue a semipostal to contribute to funding for breast cancer research. |
| 112-81 | December 31, 2011 | National Defense Authorization Act for Fiscal Year 2012 | Made appropriations related to Army, Navy and Marine Corps, Air Force, and defense-wide activities with a number of nonbudgetary provisions, and extended the Small Business Innovation Research and Small Business Technology Transfer programs through 2017. |
| 112-82 | January 3, 2012 | Belarus Democracy and Human Rights Act of 2011 | Expressed support for free press broadcasting in Belarusian, and established various sanctions and criteria to Belarus. |
| 112-83 | January 3, 2012 | (No short title) | Named a Postal Service facility in Little Ferry, New Jersey after Sergeant Matthew J. Fenton. |
| 112-84 | January 3, 2012 | (No short title) | Extended until 2017 the Judicial Conference's authority to redact financial disclosure reports to protect personal and sensitive information. |
| 112-85 | January 3, 2012 | (No short title) | Named an area near federal buildings in Jackson, Tennessee after Monroe Dunaway Anderson and permitted the installation of a historical marker and statue. |
| 112-86 | January 3, 2012 | Risk-Based Security Screening for Members of the Armed Forces Act | Directed for the creation of a program to expedite some security screenings for a uniformed Armed Forces member or their family. |
| 112-87 | January 3, 2012 | Intelligence Authorization Act for Fiscal Year 2012 | Made appropriations, implementations and provisions related to intelligence agencies. |
| 112-88 | January 3, 2012 | (No short title) | Required the production by the Federal Deposit Insurance Corporation of a study of the impact of insured depository institution failures. |
| 112-89 | January 3, 2012 | (No short title) | Named a Postal Service facility in Staten Island, New York after Sergeant Angel Mendez. |
| 112-90 | January 3, 2012 | Pipeline Safety, Regulatory Certainty, and Job Creation Act of 2011 | |
| 112-91 | January 31, 2012 | Airport and Airway Extension Act of 2012 | Extended a number of provisions until February 17, 2012. |
| 112-92 | February 1, 2012 | SOAR Technical Corrections Act | Made minor changes to the Scholarships for Opportunity and Results Ac. |
| 112-93 | February 10, 2012 | Ultralight Aircraft Smuggling Prevention Act of 2012 | Extended the definition of aviation smuggling under the Tariff Act of 1930. |
| 112-94 | February 14, 2012 | (No short title) | Designated the Noxubee National Wildlife Refuge after Sam Hamilton. |
| 112-95 | February 14, 2012 | FAA Modernization and Reform Act of 2012 | Multi-Years appropriations bill for the Federal Aviation Administration, with an orphan earmark rider. |
| 112-96 | February 22, 2012 | Middle Class Tax Relief and Job Creation Act of 2012 | Final version of the Temporary Payroll Tax Cut Continuation Act of 2011. |
| 112-97 | February 27, 2012 | (No short title) | Performed a land transfer to the Quileute Tribe reservation on the Olympic Peninsula for the moving of infrastructure outside of disaster-threatened areas. |
| 112-98 | March 8, 2012 | Federal Restricted Buildings and Grounds Improvement Act of 2011 | Made revisions to the criminal code regarding trespassing on restricted federal buildings and grounds. |
| 112-99 | March 13, 2012 | (No short title) | Amended the Tariff Act of 1930 with regard to countervailing and antidumping duties. |
| 112-100 | March 14, 2012 | St. Croix River Crossing Project Authorization Act | Authorized the construction of a new bridge to provide an alternative to the Stillwater Lift Bridge across the Saint Croix National Scenic Riverway |
| 112-101 | March 14, 2012 | (No short title) | Named a federal courthouse in Anchorage, Alaska after James Martin Fitzgerald. |
| 112-102 | March 30, 2012 | Surface Transportation Extension Act of 2012 | Extended of federal-aid highway, transit, and other programs funded out of the Highway Trust Fund. |
| 112-103 | April 2, 2012 | HALE Scouts Act | Allowed for 140 acres in the Ouachita National Forest to be sold to the Indian Nations Council of the Boy Scouts of America to expand the Oklahoma Hale Scout Reservation. |
| 112-104 | April 2, 2012 | United States Marshals Service 225th Anniversary Commemorative Coin Act | Mandated the production of coins to celebrate the anniversary of the United States Marshals Service. |
| 112-105 | April 4, 2012 | Stop Trading on Congressional Knowledge Act or STOCK Act | Prohibited members and employees of Congress from using nonpublic information derived from their official positions for personal benefit. |
| 112-106 | April 5, 2012 | Jumpstart Our Business Startups Act | Amended securities law by creating an "emerging growth company" category, increasing flexibility related to various measures and in particular crowdfunding. |
| 112-107 | May 15, 2012 | (No short title) | Named a Postal Service facility in Cedar Park, Texas after Matthew Troy Morris. |
| 112-108 | May 15, 2012 | (No short title) | Named a Postal Service facility in Ardmore, Oklahoma after Micheal E. Phillips. |
| 112-109 | May 15, 2012 | (No short title) | Named a Postal Service facility in Rockaway, New York after John J. Cook. |
| 112-110 | May 15, 2012 | (No short title) | Named a Postal Service facility in Iuka, Mississippi after Jason W. Vaughn. |
| 112-111 | May 15, 2012 | (No short title) | Named a Postal Service facility in Geneva, New York after Steven Blaine Riccione. |
| 112-112 | May 15, 2012 | (No short title) | Named a Postal Service facility in Tomball, Texas after the local veterans. |
| 112-113 | May 15, 2012 | Brian A. Terry Memorial Act | Named a Border Patrol station in Bisbee, Arizona after Brian A. Terry. |
| 112-114 | May 15, 2012 | (No short title) | Named a Postal Service facility in Westfield, Massachusetts after William T. Trant. |
| 112-115 | May 15, 2012 | (No short title) | Named a Postal Service facility in Yountville, California after Alejandro R. Ruiz. |
| 112-116 | May 15, 2012 | (No short title) | Named a Postal Service facility in Ballwin, Missouri after Peter J. Navarro Post. |
| 112-117 | May 15, 2012 | (No short title) | Named a Postal Service facility in Chesterfield, Missouri after Matthew P. Pathenos. |
| 112-118 | May 15, 2012 | (No short title) | Named a Postal Service facility in Saint Charles, Missouri after Drew W. Weaver. |
| 112-119 | May 15, 2012 | (No short title) | Allowed new conditions on the sale of land by the Federal Bureau of Prisons to the city of Tracy, California. |
| 112-120 | May 25, 2012 | (No short title) | Made modifications to the award of Post‑Deployment/Mobilization Respite Absence administrative absence days for certain members of the reserve. |
| 112-121 | May 25, 2012 | Temporary Bankruptcy Judgeships Extension Act of 2012 | Extended certain offices authorized or extended under the Bankruptcy Judgeship Act of 1992 and Bankruptcy Judgeship Act of 2005. |
| 112-122 | May 30, 2012 | Export-Import Bank Reauthorization Act of 2012 | Amended and reauthorized the charter of the Export-Import Bank (the Export-Import Bank Act of 1945) of the United States. |
| 112-123 | May 31, 2012 | National Flood Insurance Program Extension Act | Extended the National Flood Insurance Program until July 2012 and made amendments to it regarding properties that are not primary residences. |
| 112-124 | June 5, 2012 | (No short title) | Named a Postal Service facility in Pittston, Pennsylvania after Joshua D. Miller. |
| 112-125 | June 5, 2012 | (No short title) | Named a Postal Service facility in Pine City, Minnesota after Daniel L. Fedder. |
| 112-126 | June 5, 2012 | (No short title) | Named a Postal Service facility in Bronx, New York after Isaac T. Cortes. |
| 112-127 | June 5, 2012 | Border Tunnel Prevention Act of 2012 | Amended the criminal code with regard to the use of tunnel smuggling between the United States and Mexico. |
| 112-128 | June 5, 2012 | Sequoia and King Canyon National Parks Backcountry Access Act | Forced the resumption of authorizations to provide commercial services via commercial stock operations (horse and mule transportation) in parts of Sequoia and Kings Canyon National Parks. Issuance of such permits had been suspended in the wake of High Sierra Hikers Association v. Blackwell, 390 F.3d 630 (9th Cir. 2004). |
| 112-129 | June 8, 2012 | (No short title) | Allowed land originally conveyed to Minnesota for expansion of Grand Marais/Cook County Airport to be used for other projects. |
| 112-130 | June 8, 2012 | (No short title) | Made Israeli nationals eligible to receive E-2 visas. |
| 112-131 | June 8, 2012 | John F. Kennedy Center Reauthorization Act of 2012 | Reauthorized appropriations for the John F. Kennedy Center for the Performing Arts through fiscal year 2014 with a few additions regarding a planned addition to the center. |
| 112-132 | June 13, 2012 | (No short title) | Allowed the Chief of the Forest Service to award certain contracts for large air tankers earlier than the normal minimal period. |
| 112-133 | June 15, 2012 | Salmon Lake Land Selection Resolution Act | Ratified the Salmon Lake Area Land Ownership Consolidation Agreement made under the Alaska Native Claims Settlement Act between the United States, the state of Alaska and the Bering Straits Native Corporation. |
| 112-134 | June 15, 2012 | (No short title) | Authorized land exchange between the National Oceanic and Atmospheric Administration and the city of Pascagoula, Mississippi. |
| 112-135 | June 21, 2012 | (No short title) | Made a technical correction in 112-108. |
| 112-136 | June 21, 2012 | (No short title) | Made a technical correction in 112-122. |
| 112-137 | June 27, 2012 | (No short title) | Modified a land grant patent issued by the Secretary of the Interior to the Great Lakes Shipwreck Historical Society of Chippewa County, Michigan. |
| 112-138 | June 27, 2012 | (No short title) | Provided for the conveyance of two acre of land in the Wasatch-Cache National Forest to the town of Alta, Utah. |
| 112-139 | June 27, 2012 | East Bench Irrigation District Water Contract Extension Act | Authorized the Secretary of the Interior to extend a contract for water services with the East Bench Irrigation District. |
| 112-140 | June 29, 2012 | Temporary Surface Transportation Extension Act of 2012 | Further extended the provisions of the Surface Transportation Extension Act of 2012 |
| 112-141 | July 6, 2012 | MAP-21 | Continues the Surface Transportation Extension Act of 2012, with additional provisions regarding the Keystone XL Pipeline, the Gulf Coast Restoration Trust Fund, coal combustion residuals permit programs, environmental review processes and historic preservation. |
| 112-142 | July 9, 2012 | Church Plan Investment Clarification Act | Corrected a technical error in Public Law 108-359 that prevented church pension plans from investing in collective trusts (which was the goal of that law). |
| 112-143 | July 9, 2012 | (No short title) | Amended the District of Columbia Official Code to allow for easier development of the Southwest Waterfront Project Site. |
| 112-144 | July 9, 2012 | Food and Drug Administration Safety and Innovation Act | Amended the Federal Food, Drug, and Cosmetic Act to reauthorize and establish new Food and Drug Administration (FDA) user-fee programs. |
| 112-145 | July 18, 2012 | District of Columbia Special Election Reform Act | Enabled the District of Columbia Board of Elections to schedule special elections to fill vacancies to certain positions. |
| 112-146 | July 18, 2012 | Former Charleston Naval Base Land Exchange Act of 2012 | Allowed for land exchange between the Department of Homeland Security and the South Carolina State Ports Authority for extension of the Federal Law Enforcement Training Center. |
| 112-147 | July 23, 2012 | Veteran Skills to Jobs Act | Direct federal licensing authorities to consider and accept training received as a member of the Armed Forces for license requirements. |
| 112-148 | July 26, 2012 | Raoul Wallenberg Centennial Celebration Act | Arranged for the granting of a congressional medal to commemorate Raoul Wallenberg's achievements and heroic actions during the Holocaust. |
| 112-149 | July 26, 2012 | Insular Areas Act of 2011 | Amended the Compact of Free Association Amendments Act of 2003 regarding radiochemical analyses at Enewetak Atoll, temporary assignment of judges, and minimum wages in the American Samoa. |
| 112-150 | July 27, 2012 | United States-Israel Enhanced Security Cooperation Act of 2012 | Enhance strategic cooperation between the United States and Israel by establishing policy, amending some acts and requesting various reports. |
| 112-151 | July 30, 2012 | HEARTH Act of 2012 | Allowed Indian tribes to enter into certain leases without prior express approval from the Secretary of the Interior, and to rely on federal rather than tribal environmental review processes in certain situations. |
| 112-152 | August 3, 2012 | National Baseball Hall of Fame Commemorative Coin Act | Mandated the production of coins to commemorate the National Baseball Hall of Fame. |
| 112-153 | August 3, 2012 | Pilot's Bill of Rights | Subjected various National Transportation Safety Board proceedings to the Federal Rules of Civil Procedure and Federal Rules of Evidence and made related amendments related to plane pilot-related procedures. |
| 112-154 | August 6, 2012 | Honoring America's Veterans and Caring for Camp Lejeune Families Act of 2012 | Created or expanded various veterans' benefits programs dealing mainly with healthcare (notably exposition to contaminated water at Camp Lejeune until the late 80s), housing, education and management of the Arlington National Cemetery. |
| 112-155 | August 7, 2012 | Sequestration Transparency Act of 2012 | Required presentation of a report on implementation of certain discretionary reductions under the Budget Control Act of 2011. |
| 112-156 | August 10, 2012 | (No short title) | Named a Postal Service facility in Hartshorne, Oklahoma after Warren Lindley. |
| 112-157 | August 10, 2012 | (No short title) | Amended the tribal membership requirement for the Tiwa Ysleta del Sur Pueblo Indian tribe of Texas. |
| 112-158 | August 10, 2012 | Iran Threat Reduction and Syria Human Rights Act of 2012 | Established sanctions and human right measures against Iran and Syria. |
| 112-159 | August 10, 2012 | (No short title) | Named a Postal Service facility in Tampa, Florida after Abe Brown. |
| 112-160 | August 10, 2012 | (No short title) | Named a Postal Service facility in Abbeville, Louisiana after Richard Franklin Abshire. |
| 112-161 | August 10, 2012 | (No short title) | Named a Postal Service facility in Rome City, Indiana after Nicholas Scott Hartge. |
| 112-162 | August 10, 2012 | (No short title) | Named a Postal Service facility in Canton, Mississippi after Landres Cheeks. |
| 112-163 | August 10, 2012 | (No short title) | Amend the African Growth and Opportunity Act with regard to South Sudan, made tariff changes regarding free trade with the Dominican Republic, renewed certain provisions of the Burmese Freedom and Democracy Act of 2003 for three years, raised some 2017 corporate taxes and extended certain custom fees until 2021. |
| 112-164 | August 10, 2012 | La Pine Land Conveyance Act | Allowed federal land to be conveyed to the city of La Pine, Oregon. |
| 112-165 | August 10, 2012 | Wallowa Forest Service Compound Conveyance Act | Allowed an unused Forest Service compound in Wallowa, Oregon to be conveyed to that city for conversion into an interpretation center. |
| 112-166 | August 10, 2012 | Presidential Appointment Efficiency and Streamlining Act of 2011 | Eliminated senate approval for a number of positions, added requirements for the director of the census and required the Government Accountability Office to report on presidential appointments that do not require senate approval. |
| 112-167 | August 10, 2012 | (No short title) | Authorized the construction of battery recharging stations for vehicles owned by U.S. Senate employees. |
| 112-168 | August 10, 2012 | Haqqani Network Terrorist Designation Act of 2012 | Directed the Secretary of State to examine the possibility of designating the Pakistani Haqqani network as a terrorist organization. |
| 112-169 | August 10, 2012 | (No short title) | Allowed for National Infantry Museum and Soldier Center Commemorative Coin surcharges to be used for retiring debt associated with the construction of the Museum and Center. |
| 112-170 | August 16, 2012 | (No short title) | A parallel version of P.L. 112-167 for the House of Representative. |
| 112-171 | August 16, 2012 | (No short title) | Eliminated certain exemption granted to the Transportation Security Administration under the Uniformed Services Employment and Reemployment Rights Act. |
| 112-172 | August 16, 2012 | Ambassador James R. Lilley and Congressman Stephen J. Solarz North Korea Human Rights Reauthorization Act of 2012 | Made various North Korea-related reauthorizations and extensions until fiscal year 2017. |
| 112-173 | August 16, 2012 | (No short title) | Extended certain requirements of online publication under the STOCK Act until September 2012. |
| 112-174 | September 20, 2012 | (No short title) | Required the Joint Committee on the Library to accept a statue of Frederick Douglass donated by the District of Columbia and display it in Emancipation Hall. |
| 112-175 | September 28, 2012 | Continuing Appropriations Resolution, 2013 | Initial budgeting resolution providing government funding through March 2013. |
| 112-176 | September 28, 2012 | (No short title) | Extended four immigration programs through September 30, 2015. |
| 112-177 | September 28, 2012 | Pesticide Registration Improvement Extension Act of 2012 | Reauthorized and amended the Federal Insecticide, Fungicide, and Rodenticide Act. |
| 112-178 | September 28, 2012 | (No short title) | Postpones the latest dates at which various individuals must make financial disclosure forms available online under the STOCK act. |
| 112-179 | October 5, 2012 | Minnesota Chippewa Tribe Judgment Fund Distribution Act of 2012 | Enacted a land compensation and timber evaluation claim settlement with the Minnesota Chippewa Tribe. |
| 112-180 | October 5, 2012 | (No short title) | Named a federal courthouse in Fort Pierce, Florida after Alto Lee Adams, Sr. |
| 112-181 | October 5, 2012 | Lions Clubs International Century of Service Commemorative Coin Act | Mandated the production of coins in commemoration of the centennial of the founding of the Lions Clubs International in 2017. |
| 112-182 | October 5, 2012 | Lowell National Historical Park Land Exchange Act of 2012 | Authorized a land exchange between the Lowell National Historical Park and the City of Lowell, Massachusetts the Commonwealth of Massachusetts, or the University of Massachusetts Building Authority so that land where currently stands a visitor center parking lot can be developed. |
| 112-183 | October 5, 2012 | Billfish Conservation Act of 2012 | Prohibited the sale of billfish and subjected violations to Magnuson-Stevens Fishery Conservation and Management Act penalties. |
| 112-184 | October 5, 2012 | (No short title) | Named a federal courthouse in Buffalo, New York after Robert H. Jackson. |
| 112-185 | October 5, 2012 | (No short title) | Granted astronauts clear title and ownership of certain artifacts received during participation to certain space programs. |
| 112-186 | October 5, 2012 | SAFE DOSES Act | Increased sentences related to theft and trafficking of medical supplies, and provided for wiretapping authorizations and victim restitution in cases related to such crimes. |
| 112-187 | October 5, 2012 | (No short title) | Named a federal courthouse in Juneau, Alaska after Robert Boochever. |
| 112-188 | October 5, 2012 | Divisional Realignment Act of 2012 | Altered judicial divisions within the Eastern District of Missouri and the Northern District of Mississippi. |
| 112-189 | October 5, 2012 | Reporting Efficiency Improvement Act | Eliminated reporting requirements for two currently inactive federal grant programs. |
| 112-190 | October 5, 2012 | (No short title) | Corrected a drafting error in the Trademark Dilution Revision Act of 2006 that created an unwanted defense against trademark dilution actions. |
| 112-191 | October 5, 2012 | VA Major Construction Authorization and Expiring Authorities Extension Act of 2012 | Extended various Veterans Affairs projects and programs through fiscal year 2013. |
| 112-192 | October 5, 2012 | (No short title) | Authorized the president to approve or order votes in favor of assistance to Burma, and established requirements related to such votes. |
| 112-193 | October 5, 2012 | FDA User Fee Corrections Act of 2012 | Made changes to certain Food and Drug Administration user fees |
| 112-194 | October 5, 2012 | Government Charge Card Abuse Prevention Act of 2012 | Established monitoring and management requirements related to federal charge cards. |
| 112-195 | October 5, 2012 | Hazardous Waste Electronic Manifest Establishment Act | Directed the Environmental Protection Agency to establish an electronic version of the hazardous waste manifest system. |
| 112-196 | October 5, 2012 | Military Commercial Driver's License Act of 2012 | Changes certain commercial driver license requirements that state are subject to and authorized them to emit such permits to active Armed Forces member who are not resident of, but stationed in that state. |
| 112-197 | November 27, 2012 | New York City Natural Gas Supply Enhancement Act | Allows construction and operation of natural gas pipeline facilities in the Gateway National Recreation Area |
| 112-198 | November 27, 2012 | Veterans' Compensation Cost-of-Living Adjustment Act of 2012 | Increases compensation rates for veterans with service-connected disabilities and the rates of dependency and indemnity compensation for survivors of some disabled veterans |
| 112-199 | November 27, 2012 | Whistleblower Protection Enhancement Act of 2012 | Clarifies which disclosures of information are protected from prohibited personnel practices; requires a statement in non-disclosure policies, forms, and agreements that they conform with disclosure protections; provides certain authority for the Special Counsel |
| 112-200 | November 27, 2012 | European Union Emissions Trading Scheme Prohibition Act of 2011 | Prohibits United States operators of civil aircraft from participating in the European Union's emissions trading scheme |
| 112-201 | December 4, 2012 | Mark Twain Commemorative Coin Act | Requires the production of a Mark Twain coin |
| 112-202 | December 4, 2012 | Taking Essential Steps for Testing Act of 2012 | Amended statute regarding laboratory certification |
| 112-203 | December 4, 2012 | (No short title) | Extends the Undertaking Spam, Spyware, And Fraud Enforcement With Enforcers beyond Borders Act of 2006 (U.S. SAFE WEB Act) to September 30, 2012 |
| 112-204 | December 4, 2012 | (No short title) | Consolidates reporting requirements for the American Recovery and Reinvestment Act of 2009 and the Emergency Economic Stabilization Act of 2008 |
| 112-205 | December 7, 2012 | Jaime Zapata Border Enforcement Security Task Force Act | Establish a Border Enforcement Security Task Force program to enhance border security among federal, state, and local law enforcement and border personnel. |
| 112-206 | December 7, 2012 | Child Protection Act of 2012 | Amends the federal criminal code to impose a fine and/or prison term of up to 20 years for transporting, receiving, distributing, selling, or possessing pornographic images of a child under the age of 12. |
| 112-207 | December 7, 2012 | (No short title) | To change the effective date for the Internet publication of certain financial disclosure forms. |
| 112-208 | December 14, 2012 | Magnitsky Act | To authorize the extension of nondiscriminatory treatment (normal trade relations treatment) to products of the Russian Federation and Moldova and to require reports on the compliance of the Russian Federation with its obligations as a member of the World Trade Organization, and for other purposes. |
| 112-209 | December 18, 2012 | March of Dimes Commemorative Coin Act of 2012 | Directs the Secretary of the Treasury to mint and issue up to 500,000 $1 silver coins emblematic of the mission and programs of the March of Dimes. |
| 112-210 | December 18, 2012 | American Energy Manufacturing Technical Corrections Act | no description |
| 112-211 | December 20, 2012 | Patent Law Treaties Implementation Act of 2012 | Amends federal patent law to implement the Geneva Act of the Hague Agreement Concerning the International Registration of Industrial Designs (Hague Treaty) and the Patent Law Treaty. |
| 112-212 | December 20, 2012 | Bridgeport Indian Colony Land Trust, Health, and Economic Development Act of 2012 | Declares approximately 39.36 acres of federal land in Mono County, California, to be held in trust by the United States for the benefit of the Bridgeport Indian Colony. |
| 112-213 | December 20, 2012 | Coast Guard and Maritime Transportation Act of 2012 | To authorize appropriations for the Coast Guard for fiscal years 2013 through 2014, and for other purposes. |
| 112-214 | December 20, 2012 | To allow the Pascua Yaqui Tribe to determine the requirements for membership in that tribe. | Makes any U.S. citizen of Pascua Yaqui blood who is enrolled by the Pascua Yaqui Tribe eligible for the federal services and benefits made available to members of federally recognized tribes. |
| 112-215 | December 20, 2012 | (No short title) | To amend the Federal Deposit Insurance Act with respect to information provided to the Bureau of Consumer Financial Protection. |
| 112-216 | December 20, 2012 | (No short title) | To amend the Electronic Fund Transfer Act to limit the fee disclosure requirement for an automatic teller machine to the screen of that machine. |
| 112-217 | December 20, 2012 | DART Act | To obtain an unqualified audit opinion, and improve financial accountability and management at the Department of Homeland Security. |
| 112-218 | December 20, 2012 | No-Hassle Flying Act of 2012 | Authorizes the Assistant Secretary of Homeland Security (Transportation Security Administration [TSA]) to determine whether checked baggage on a flight or flight segment originating at an airport outside the United States must be re-screened in the United States for explosives before it can continue on any additional flight or flight segment if the baggage has already been screened in the foreign airport in accordance with an aviation security preclearance agreement between the United States and the country in which the airport is located. |
| 112-219 | December 28, 2012 | (No short title) | Named a Postal Service facility in Crosby, Texas, after the Army First Sergeant David McNerney Post Office Building. |
| 112-220 | December 28, 2012 | Countering Iran in the Western Hemisphere Act of 2012 | To provide for a comprehensive strategy to counter Iran's growing hostile presence and activity in the Western Hemisphere, and for other purposes. |
| 112-221 | December 28, 2012 | (No short title) | Named a Postal Service facility in Rose Bud, Arkansas, after Nicky 'Nick' Daniel Bacon. |
| 112-222 | December 28, 2012 | (No short title) | Named a Postal Service facility in Mastic Beach, New York, after Brigadier General Nathaniel Woodhull. |
| 112-223 | December 28, 2012 | (No short title) | Named a Postal Service facility in Macomb, Michigan, after Lance Cpl. Anthony A. DiLisio Clinton-Macomb Carrier Annex". |
| 112-224 | December 28, 2012 | (No short title) | Named a Postal Service facility in Baldwinsville, New York, after Corporal Kyle Schneider. |
| 112-225 | December 28, 2012 | (No short title) | Named a Postal Service facility in Ellwood City, Pennsylvania, after Sergeant Leslie H. Sabo, Jr.. |
| 112-226 | December 28, 2012 | (No short title) | To amend the Revised Organic Act of the Virgin Islands to provide for direct review by the United States Supreme Court of decisions of the Virgin Islands Supreme Court, and for other purposes. |
| 112-227 | December 28, 2012 | (No short title) | To amend section 1059(e) of the National Defense Authorization Act for Fiscal Year 2006 to clarify that a period of employment abroad by the Chief of Mission or United States Armed Forces as a translator, interpreter, or in a security-related position in an executive or managerial capacity is to be counted as a period of residence and physical presence in the United States for purposes of qualifying for naturalization, and for other purposes. |
| 112-228 | December 28, 2012 | (No short title) | Establishing the date for the counting of the electoral votes for president and Vice President cast by the electors in December 2012. |
| 112-229 | December 28, 2012 | D.C. Courts and Public Defender Service Act of 2011 | To amend title 11, District of Columbia Official Code, to revise certain administrative authorities of the District of Columbia courts, and to authorize the District of Columbia Public Defender Service to provide professional liability insurance for officers and employees of the Service for claims relating to services furnished within the scope of employment with the Service. |
| 112-230 | December 28, 2012 | Hatch Act Modernization Act of 2012 | To amend the provisions of title 5, United States Code, which are commonly referred to as the 'Hatch Act', to scale back the provision forbidding certain State and local employees from seeking elective office, clarify the application of certain provisions to the District of Columbia, and modify the penalties which may be imposed for certain violations under subchapter III of chapter 73 of that title. |
| 112-231 | December 28, 2012 | 21st Century Language Act of 2012 | Removes references to the word "lunatic" from rules of construction of the U.S. Code and banking law provisions concerning: (1) trust powers of banks, and (2) bank consolidations and mergers. |
| 112-232 | December 28, 2012 | Barona Band of Mission Indians Land Transfer Clarification Act of 2012 | Amends the Native American Technical Corrections Act of 2004 to revise the description of the land to be held in trust for the Barona Band of Mission Indians of California. |
| 112-233 | December 28, 2012 | (No short title) | A bill to designate the United States courthouse located at 2601 2nd Avenue North, Billings, Montana, as the "James F. Battin United States Courthouse". |
| 112-234 | December 28, 2012 | GAO Mandates Revision Act of 2012 | To repeal or modify certain mandates of the Government Accountability Office. |
| 112-235 | December 28, 2012 | Public Interest Declassification Board Reauthorization Act of 2012 | Amends the Public Interest Declassification Act of 2000 to: (1) require any appointment to the Public Interest Declassification Board to be for three years from the date of the appointment, (2) remove the requirement that a board member appointed to fill a vacancy before the expiration of a term serve for the remainder of such term, and (3) extend Board authority through 2014. |
| 112-236 | December 28, 2012 | Theft of Trade Secrets Clarification Act of 2012 | Amends the Economic Espionage Act of 1996 to apply the prohibition against the theft of trade secrets to a trade secret that is related to a product or service used in or intended for use interstate or foreign commerce (currently, a trade secret that is related to or included in a product that is produced for or placed interstate or foreign commerce). |
| 112-237 | December 28, 2012 | (No short title) | A bill to amend the Federal Water Pollution Control Act to reauthorize the Lake Pontchartrain Basin Restoration Program, to designate certain Federal buildings, and for other purposes. |
| 112-238 | December 30, 2012 | FISA Amendments Act Reauthorization Act of 2012 | Amends the FISA Amendments Act of 2008 to extend until December 31, 2017: (1) the date for repeal of title VII of the Foreign Intelligence Surveillance Act of 1978 (procedures concerning the electronic surveillance of certain persons outside the United States for foreign intelligence information purposes); and (2) any order, authorization, or directive issued or made under that title. |
| 112-239 | January 2, 2013 | National Defense Authorization Act for Fiscal Year 2013 | To authorize appropriations for fiscal year 2013 for military activities of the Department of Defense, for military construction, and for defense activities of the Department of Energy, to prescribe military personnel strengths for such fiscal year, and for other purposes. |
| 112-240 | January 2, 2013 | American Taxpayer Relief Act of 2012 | To extend certain tax relief provisions enacted in 2001 and 2003, and to provide for expedited consideration of a bill providing for comprehensive tax reform, and for other purposes |
| 112-241 | January 10, 2013 | (No short title) | To designate the City of Salem, Massachusetts, as the Birthplace of the National Guard of the United States. |
| 112-242 | January 10, 2013 | Medicare IVIG Access and Strengthening Medicare and Repaying Taxpayers Act of 2012 | Directs the Secretary of Health and Human Services (HHS) to establish a demonstration project under title XVIII (Medicare) of the Social Security Act (SSA) to evaluate the benefits of providing payment for items and services needed for the administration, within the homes of Medicare beneficiaries, of intravenous immune globin (IVIG) for the treatment of primary immune deficiency diseases. |
| 112-243 | January 10, 2013 | (No short title) | Named a Postal Service facility in Cocoa, Florida, after Harry T. and Harriette Moore. |
| 112-244 | January 10, 2013 | Lake Thunderbird Efficient Use Act of 2012 | Authorizes the Secretary of the Interior to amend an existing contract or enter into one or more new contracts with the Central Oklahoma Master Conservancy District for the storage and conveyance of nonproject water in Norman project facilities to augment municipal and industrial supplies for the cities served by the District, if the Secretary determines that there is enough excess capacity in the reservoir on the Little River known as Lake Thunderbird that nonproject water can be stored there. |
| 112-245 | January 10, 2013 | Pinnacles National Park Act | Establishes Pinnacles National Park in California to: (1) preserve and interpret for the benefit of future generations the chaparral, grasslands, blue oak woodlands, and majestic valley oak savanna ecosystems of the park's area, the areas's geomorphology, riparian watersheds, unique flora and fauna, and the ancestral and cultural history of Native Americans, settlers, and explorers; and (2) interpret the recovery program for the California Condor and the international significance of that program. Abolishes Pinnacles National Monument and includes the lands and interests therein Pinnacles National Park. Redesignates the Pinnacles Wilderness as the Hain Wilderness. |
| 112-246 | January 10, 2013 | (No short title) | Named a Postal Service facility in Little Rock, Arkansas, after Sidney 'Sid' Sanders McMath. |
| 112-247 | January 10, 2013 | (No short title) | Named a Postal Service facility in Roseville, California, after Lance Corporal Victor A. Dew. |
| 112-248 | January 10, 2013 | Improper Payments Elimination and Recovery Improvement Act of 2012 | To intensify efforts to identify, prevent, and recover payment error, waste, fraud, and abuse within Federal spending. |
| 112-249 | January 10, 2013 | Improving Transparency of Education Opportunities for Veterans Act of 2012 | To amend title 38, United States Code, to direct the Secretary of Veterans Affairs to develop a comprehensive policy to improve outreach and transparency to veterans and members of the Armed Forces through the provision of information on institutions of higher learning, and for other purposes. |
| 112-250 | January 10, 2013 | (No short title) | To authorize the Secretary of Agriculture to accept the quitclaim, disclaimer, and relinquishment of a railroad right of way within and adjacent to Pike National Forest in El Paso County, Colorado, originally granted to the Mt. Manitou Park and Incline Railway Company pursuant to the Act of March 3, 1875. |
| 112-251 | January 10, 2013 | (No short title) | Named a Postal Service facility in Fowler, California, after Cecil E. Bolt. |
| 112-252 | January 10, 2013 | (No short title) | To repeal an obsolete provision in title 49, United States Code, requiring motor vehicle insurance cost reporting. |
| 112-253 | January 10, 2013 | Katie Sepich Enhanced DNA Collection Act of 2012 | Directs the Attorney General to make grants to assist states with costs associated with the implementation of minimum or enhanced DNA collection processes. Defines such processes for the purpose of this Act. |
| 112-254 | January 10, 2013 | (No short title) | Named a Postal Service facility in Mountain View, California, after Lieutenant Kenneth M. Ballard Memorial. |
| 112-255 | January 10, 2013 | (No short title) | Named a Postal Service facility in Ravenel, South Carolina, after Representative Curtis B. Inabinett, Sr.. |
| 112-256 | January 10, 2013 | (No short title) | Named a Postal Service facility in Simi Valley, California, after Postal Inspector Terry Asbury. |
| 112-257 | January 10, 2013 | Former Presidents Protection Act of 2012 | Amends the federal criminal code to eliminate certain limitations on the length of Secret Service protection for former Presidents and their spouses and children. Authorizes the Secret Service to protect: (1) former Presidents and their spouses for their lifetimes, except that protection of a spouse shall terminate in the event of remarriage; and (2) children of a former president who are under age 16. |
| 112-258 | January 10, 2013 | Video Privacy Protection Act Amendments Act of 2012 | Amends provisions of the federal criminal code authorizing a video tape service provider to disclose personally identifiable information concerning any consumer to any person with the informed, written consent of the consumer to: (1) allow such consent to be provided through an electronic means using the Internet; (2) require such consent be in a form distinct and separate from any form setting forth other legal or financial obligations of the consumer; (3) allow such consent to be given in advance for a set period of time, not to exceed two years or until consent is withdrawn by the consumer, whichever is sooner; and (4) require the video tape service provider to provide an opportunity for the consumer to withdraw such consent on a case-by-case basis or to withdraw from ongoing disclosures, at the consumer's election. |
| 112-259 | January 10, 2013 | Mt. Andrea Lawrence Designation Act of 2011 | Designates peak 12,240, which is located 0.6 miles northeast of Donahue Peak on the northern border of the Ansel Adams Wilderness and Yosemite National Park in California, as Mt. Andrea Lawrence. |
| 112-260 | January 10, 2013 | Dignified Burial and Other Veterans' Benefits Improvement Act of 2012 | Authorizes the Secretary of Veterans Affairs (VA) to furnish a casket or urn of sufficient quality for a dignified burial for the burial in a national cemetery of a deceased veteran in any case where the Secretary is unable to identify the veteran's next-of-kin and determines that sufficient resources for such casket or urn are not otherwise available. |
| 112-261 | January 10, 2013 | (No short title) | A bill to amend the Animal Welfare Act to modify the definition of "exhibitor". |
| 112-262 | January 10, 2013 | (No short title) | A joint resolution providing for the appointment of Barbara Barrett as a citizen regent of the board of regents of the Smithsonian Institution. |
| 112-263 | January 14, 2013 | (No short title) | To provide for the conveyance of certain property from the United States to the Maniilaq Association located in Kotzebue, Alaska. |
| 112-264 | January 14, 2013 | North Korean Refugee Adoption Act of 2012 | Directs the Secretary of State to designate a representative to regularly brief Congress on U.S. efforts to advocate for the best interests of North Korean children and children of one North Korean parent, including efforts to address the adoption of such children living outside North Korea without parental care. |
| 112-265 | January 14, 2013 | Investigative Assistance for Violent Crimes Act of 2012 | To amend title 28, United States Code, to clarify the statutory authority for the longstanding practice of the Department of Justice of providing investigatory assistance on request of State and local authorities with respect to certain serious violent crimes, and for other purposes. |
| 112-266 | January 14, 2013 | Drywall Safety Act of 2012 | To prevent the introduction into commerce of unsafe drywall, to ensure the manufacturer of drywall is readily identifiable, to ensure that problematic drywall removed from homes is not reused, and for other purposes. |
| 112-267 | January 14, 2013 | (No short title) | To amend title 5, United States Code, to make clear that accounts in the Thrift Savings Fund are subject to certain Federal tax levies. |
| 112-268 | January 14, 2013 | (No short title) | To authorize the issuance of right-of-way permits for natural gas pipelines in Glacier National Park, and for other purposes. |
| 112-269 | January 14, 2013 | Foreign and Economic Espionage Penalty Enhancement Act of 2012 | Amends the federal criminal code to increase the maximum fine for economic espionage (i.e., stealing or obtaining, duplicating or conveying, or buying or possessing trade secrets without authorization, intending or knowing that the offense will benefit any foreign government, foreign instrumentality, or foreign agent) committed by individuals (from $500,000 to $5 million) or by organizations (from $10 million to $10 million or 3 times the value of the stolen trade secret to the organization). |
| 112-270 | January 14, 2013 | Endangered Fish Recovery Programs Extension Act of 2012 | Extends through FY2019 the authority of the Secretary of the Interior to use power revenues collected pursuant to the Colorado River Storage Project Act for annual base funding of endangered fish recovery implementation programs for the Upper Colorado and San Juan River Basins. |
| 112-271 | January 14, 2013 | Clothe a Homeless Hero Act | Directs the Assistant Secretary of Veterans Affairs (Transportation Security Administration [TSA] ) to transfer unclaimed clothing recovered at airport security checkpoints to the local airport authority or other local authorities for donation to charity, including local veterans organizations or other local charitable organizations for distribution to homeless or needy veterans and their families. Authorizes the Assistant Secretary to enter into agreements with airport authorities for disposing of such clothing. |
| 112-272 | January 14, 2013 | World War I Centennial Commission Act | Establishes the World War I Centennial Commission to: (1) plan, develop, and execute programs, projects, and activities to commemorate the centennial of World War I; (2) encourage private organizations and state and local governments to organize and participate in such activities; (3) facilitate and coordinate such activities throughout the United States; (4) serve as a clearinghouse for the collection and dissemination of information about centennial events and plans; and (5) develop recommendations for Congress and the President for commemorating the centennial of World War I. |
| 112-273 | January 14, 2013 | Space Exploration Sustainability Act | To extend the application of certain space launch liability provisions through 2014. |
| 112-274 | January 14, 2013 | (No short title) | To correct and improve certain provisions of the Leahy-Smith America Invents Act and title 35, United States Code. |
| 112-275 | January 14, 2013 | Protect Our Kids Act of 2012 | To establish a commission to develop a national strategy and recommendations for reducing fatalities resulting from child abuse and neglect. |
| 112-276 | January 14, 2013 | Intercountry Adoption Universal Accreditation Act of 2012 | To provide for universal intercountry adoption accreditation standards, and for other purposes. |
| 112-277 | January 14, 2013 | Intelligence Authorization Act for Fiscal Year 2013 | To authorize appropriations for fiscal year 2013 for intelligence and intelligence-related activities of the United States Government and the Office of the Director of National Intelligence, the Central Intelligence Agency Retirement and Disability System, and for other purposes. |
| 112-278 | January 14, 2013 | Uninterrupted Scholars Act (USA) | To amend the Family Educational Rights and Privacy Act of 1974 to provide improvements to such Act. |
| 112-279 | January 14, 2013 | (No short title) | Named a Postal Service facility in Waterford, Wisconsin, after Captain Rhett W. Schiller |
| 112-280 | January 14, 2013 | Lieutenant Ryan Patrick Jones Post Office Designation Act | Designates the facility of the United States Postal Service located at 6 Nichols Street in Westminster, Massachusetts, as the "Lieutenant Ryan Patrick Jones Post Office Building." |
| 112-281 | January 14, 2013 | (No short title) | A bill to make a technical correction to the Flood Disaster Protection Act of 1973. |
| 112-282 | January 14, 2013 | (No short title) | A joint resolution granting the consent of Congress to the State and Province Emergency Management Assistance Memorandum of Understanding. |
| 112-283 | January 14, 2013 | Department of State Rewards Program Update and Technical Corrections Act of 2012 | To authorize the Secretary of State to pay a reward to combat transnational organized crime and for information concerning foreign nationals wanted by international criminal tribunals, and for other purposes. |

== Private laws ==
| Private law number | Date of enactment | Short title | Description |
|---|---|---|---|
| 112-1 | December 28, 2012 | A bill for the relief of Sopuruchi Chukwueke. | Provides for the relief of Sopuruchi Chukwueke. |

== Treaties ==
None ratified.

== See also ==
- List of United States federal legislation
- Acts of the 111th United States Congress
- Acts of the 113th United States Congress
