= 112th United States Congress =

2011–2013 U.S. legislative term

| ← | 111th | 113th | → |
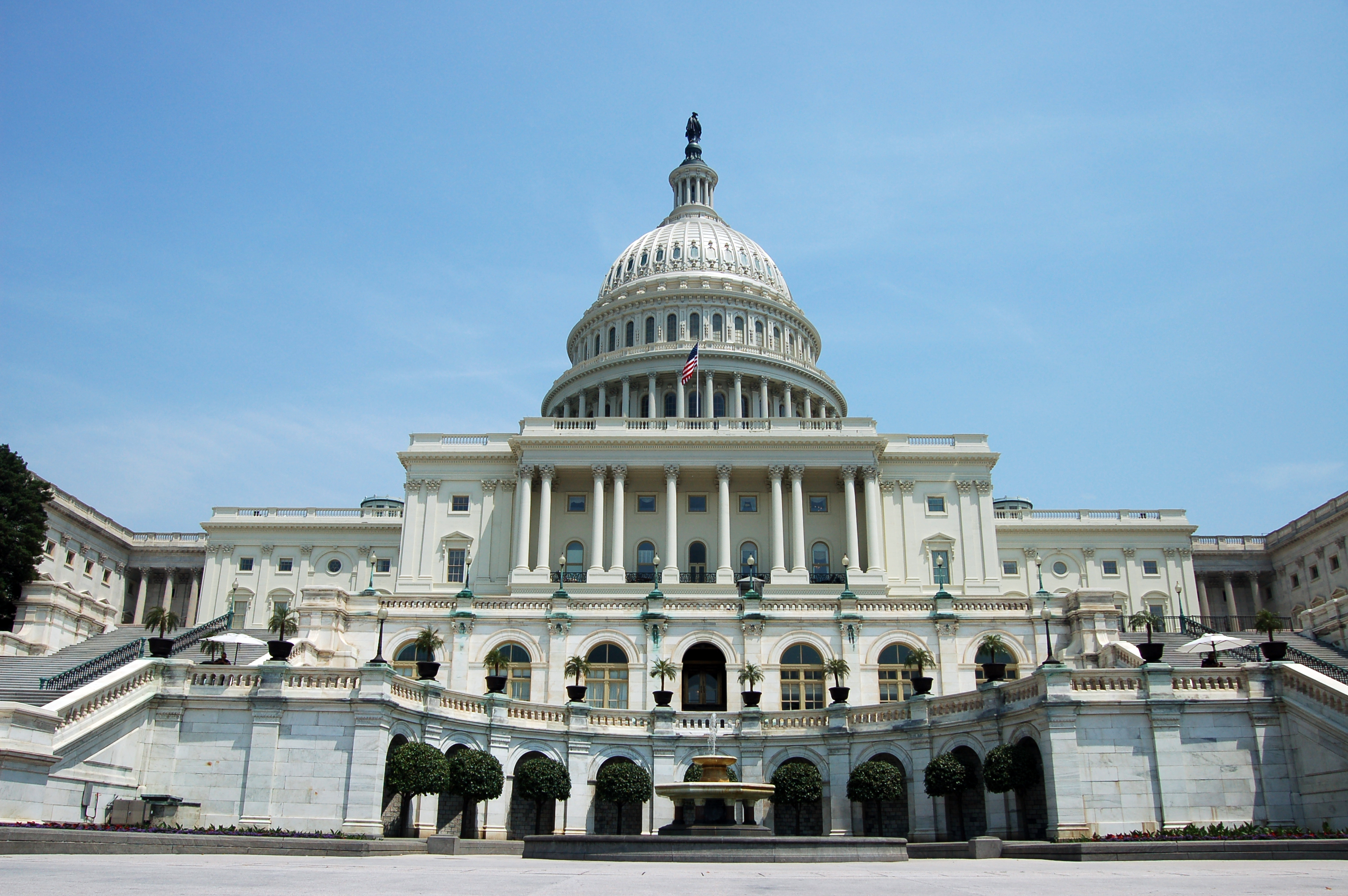
- United States Capitol (2011)

Overview
- Legislative body: United States Congress
- Jurisdiction: United States
- Term: January 3, 2011 – January 3, 2013

Senate
- Members: 100
- President: Joe Biden (D)
- President pro tempore: Daniel Inouye (D) (until December 17, 2012); Patrick Leahy (D) (from December 17, 2012)
- Party control: Democratic

House of Representatives
- Members: 435 representatives 6 non-voting delegates
- Speaker: John Boehner (R)
- Party control: Republican

Sessions
- 1st: January 5, 2011 – January 3, 2012
- 2nd: January 3, 2012 – January 3, 2013

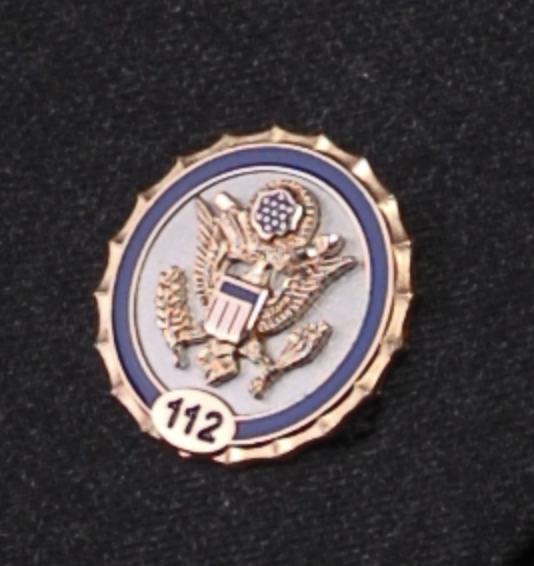
House of Representatives member pin for the 112th U.S. Congress

The 112th United States Congress was a meeting of the legislative branch of the United States federal government, from January 3, 2011, until January 3, 2013. It convened in Washington, D.C., on January 3, 2011, and ended on January 3, 2013, 17 days before the end of the presidential term to which Barack Obama was elected in 2008. Senators elected to regular terms in 2006 completed those terms in this Congress. This Congress included the last House of Representatives elected from congressional districts that were apportioned based on the 2000 census.

In the 2010 midterm elections, the Republican Party won the majority in the House of Representatives. While the Democrats kept their Senate majority, it was reduced from the previous Congress.

This was the first Congress in which the House and Senate were controlled by different parties since the 107th Congress (2001–2003). It was also the first Congress since the 36th Congress (1859–1861) in which the Republican Party held the House but not the Senate. In this Congress, the House of Representatives had the largest number of Republican members, 242, since the 80th Congress (1947–1949). This was the only Congress between the 79th (1945–1947) and the 117th (2021–2023) that did not include a member of the Kennedy family.

As of 2022, this is the most recent Congress in which Democrats held a Senate seat in Nebraska or a House seat in Arkansas, the last in which Republicans held both Senate seats in Maine, and the last in which Democrats did not hold all seats in Connecticut.

== Major events ==
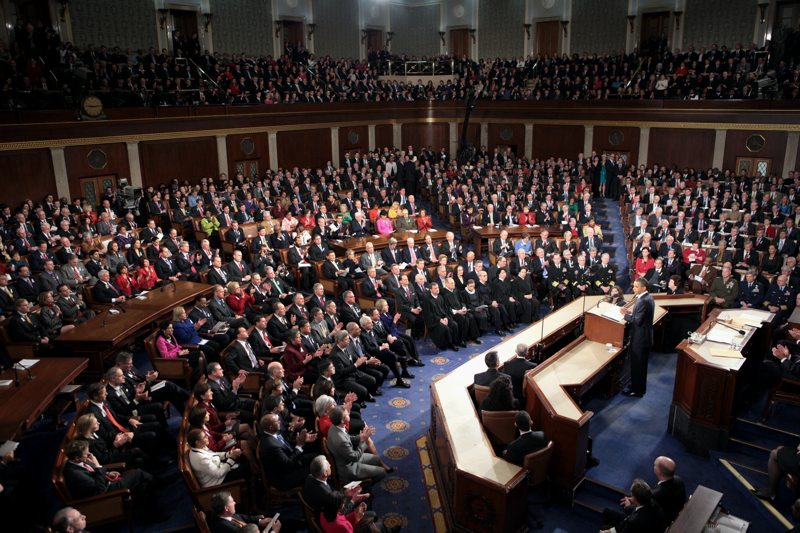
President Obama delivered the 2011 State of the Union Address on January 25, 2011

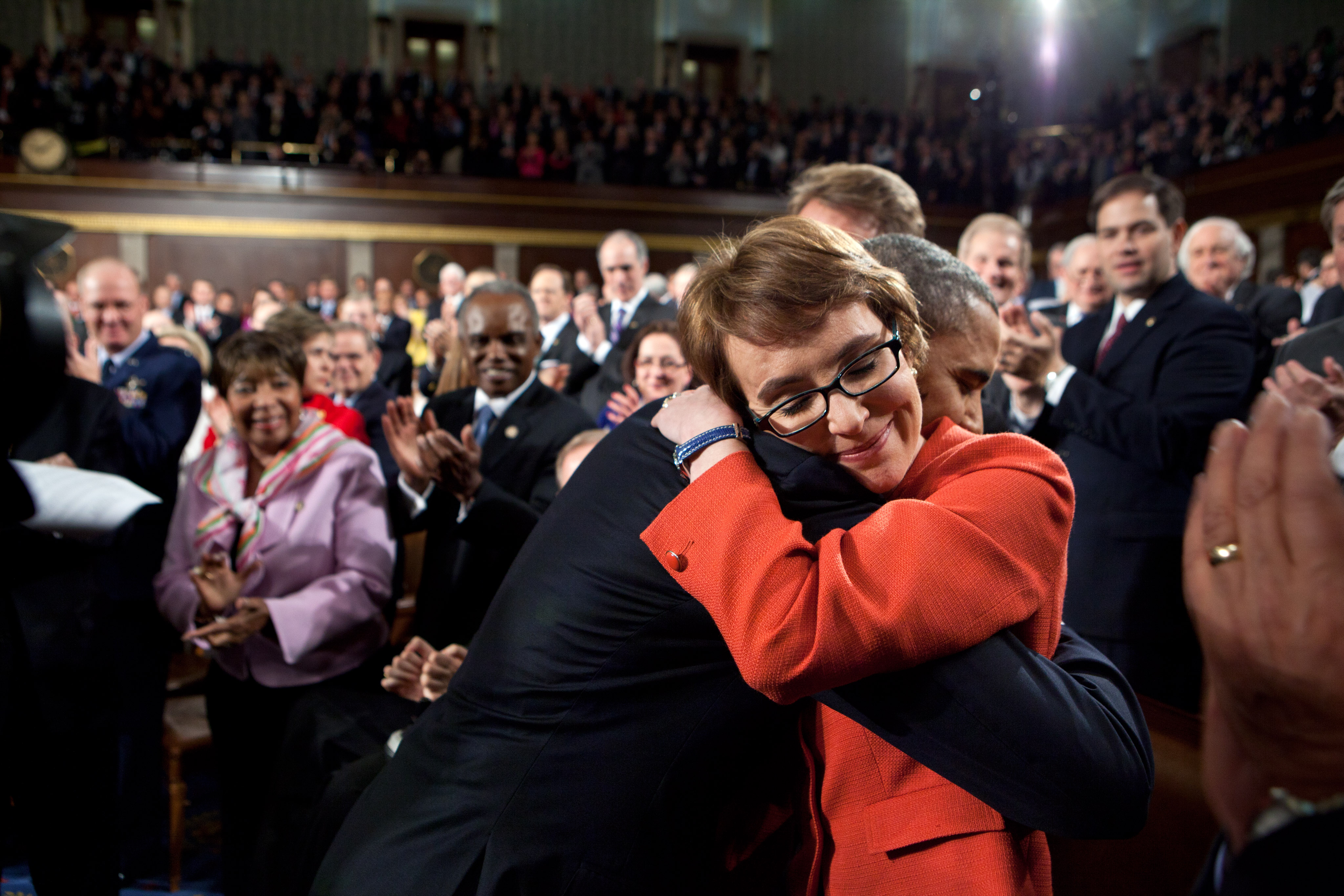
After delivering the 2012 State of the Union Address on January 24, 2012, President Obama embraces Representative Gabby Giffords, who had been shot the previous year.

- January 6, 2011: On the second day of the 112th Congress, the House of Representatives read a modified version of the U.S. Constitution, a first.
- January 8, 2011: 2011 Tucson shooting: Representative Gabby Giffords and nineteen other people were shot by a gunman in Tucson, Arizona. Six of them, including a federal judge and a congressional aide, died. Votes on the House floor were suspended for one week.
- January 25, 2011: 2011 State of the Union Address
- March 19, 2011: The United States initiated Operation Odyssey Dawn as part of the international military intervention in the Libyan Civil War. The intervention continued under the auspices of NATO as Operation Unified Protector until the end of military operations in October 2011.
- May 2, 2011: Navy SEALs killed al-Qaeda leader Osama bin Laden in Operation Neptune Spear.
- April 9, 2011: A last-minute deal between both parties averts a partial shutdown of the federal government.
- August 2, 2011: The 2011 debt-ceiling crisis ends with the Budget Control Act of 2011.
- December 18, 2011: The United States completed its withdrawal of troops from Iraq, formally ending the Iraq War.
- January 24, 2012: 2012 State of the Union Address
- June 28, 2012: In National Federation of Independent Business v. Sebelius, the Supreme Court upheld the Affordable Care Act's constitutionality but found the expansion of Medicaid unconstitutionally coercive on the states.
- November 6, 2012: 2012 general elections, including:
  - 2012 United States House of Representatives elections, in which Democrats gained eight seats, but not enough to retake the majority
  - 2012 United States Senate elections, in which Democrats gained two seats in their majority
  - 2012 United States presidential election, in which Barack Obama was re-elected to a second term
- December 14, 2012: The Sandy Hook Elementary School shooting leaves 28 dead, and prompts debate on gun control in the United States.
- January 1, 2013: United States fiscal cliff avoided. (See American Taxpayer Relief Act of 2012)

=== Potential government shutdown ===
A failure to pass a 2011 federal budget nearly led to a shutdown of non-essential government services on April 9, 2011, with the furlough of 800,000 government employees appearing imminent. President Obama met Senate Majority Leader Harry Reid and House Speaker John Boehner in the days preceding the deadline but was unable to come to an agreement to pass a budget. A one-week budget was proposed to avoid a government shutdown and allow more time for negotiations; however, proposals from both parties could not be accommodated. Obama said he would veto a proposed Republican budget over Republican social spending cuts. This was also backed by Senate Democrats who objected to such cuts as that of Planned Parenthood. However, an agreement was reached between the two parties for a one-week budget to allow for more time to negotiate after Republicans dropped their stance on the Planned Parenthood issue. The two parties ultimately agreed on a 2011 federal budget the following week.

There were many reactions to the possible shutdown with some saying the economy could be hurt during a fragile recovery and others saying the lack of an unnecessary bureaucracy would not be noticed. There was also criticism that while senators and representatives would continue to get paid others such as the police and military personnel would either not be paid for their work or have their payments deferred.

=== Debt limit crisis ===
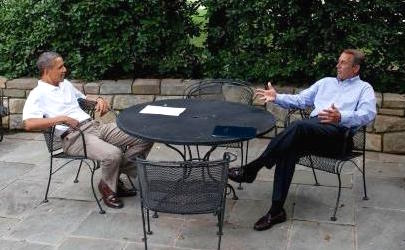
Speaker Boehner meeting with President Obama at the White House during the 2011 debt ceiling crisis

On August 2, 2011, the United States public debt was projected to reach its statutory maximum. Without an increase in that limit the U.S. Treasury would be unable to borrow money to pay its bills. Although previous statutory increases have been routine, conservative members of the House refused to allow an increase without drastically reducing government spending. Over several weeks and months, negotiators from both parties, both houses, and the White House worked to forge a compromise. The compromise bill, the Budget Control Act of 2011, was enacted on August 2.

== Major legislation ==
=== Enacted ===
- April 15, 2011: 2011 United States federal budget (as Department of Defense and Full-Year Continuing Appropriations Act, 2011), Pub. L. 112–10 (text) (PDF)
- August 2, 2011: Budget Control Act of 2011, Pub. L. 112–25 (text) (PDF)
- September 16, 2011: Leahy-Smith America Invents Act, Pub. L. 112–29 (text) (PDF)
- October 21, 2011: United States-Korea Free Trade Agreement Implementation Act, Pub. L. 112–41 (text) (PDF)
- October 21, 2011: United States-Colombia Trade Promotion Agreement Implementation Act, Pub. L. 112–42 (text) (PDF)
- October 21, 2011: United States-Panama Trade Promotion Agreement Implementation Act, Pub. L. 112–43 (text) (PDF)
- December 20, 2011: Consolidated Appropriations Act, 2012, Pub.L. 112-74
- December 31, 2011: National Defense Authorization Act for Fiscal Year 2012, Pub. L. 112–81 (text) (PDF)
- February 22, 2012: Middle Class Tax Relief and Job Creation Act of 2012, Pub. L. 112–96 (text) (PDF)
- March 8, 2012: Federal Restricted Buildings and Grounds Improvement Act of 2011, Pub. L. 112–98 (text) (PDF)
- April 4, 2012: Stop Trading on Congressional Knowledge Act of 2012 (STOCK Act), Pub. L. 112–105 (text) (PDF)
- April 5, 2012: Jumpstart Our Business Startups Act (JOBS Act), Pub. L. 112–106 (text) (PDF)
- May 30, 2012: Export-Import Bank Reauthorization Act of 2012, Pub.L. 112-122
- July 6, 2012: Moving Ahead for Progress in the 21st Century Act (MAP-21 Act), Pub. L. 112–141 (text) (PDF)
- July 9, 2012: Food and Drug Administration Safety and Innovation Act (FDASIA), Pub. L. 112–144 (text) (PDF)
- September 28, 2012: Continuing Appropriations Resolution, 2013, Pub. L. 112–175 (text) (PDF)
- November 27, 2012: Whistleblower Protection Enhancement Act of 2012, Pub. L. 112–199 (text) (PDF)
- November 27, 2012: European Union Emissions Trading Scheme Prohibition Act, Pub.L. 112-200
- December 14, 2012: Magnitsky Act, Pub. L. 112–208 (text) (PDF)
- January 2, 2013: National Defense Authorization Act for Fiscal Year 2013 Pub. L. 112–239 (text) (PDF)
- January 2, 2013: American Taxpayer Relief Act of 2012, Pub. L. 112–240 (text) (PDF)

=== Proposed ===
- American Jobs Act, S. 1549
- Cut, Cap and Balance Act, H.R. 2560
- Domestic Fuels Protection Act H.R. 4345
- Federal Reserve Transparency Act, S. 202, H.R. 459
- No Taxpayer Funding for Abortion Act, H.R. 3
- PROTECT IP Act, S. 968
- Protect Life Act, H.R. 358
- Repealing the Job-Killing Health Care Law Act, H.R. 2
- Respect for Marriage Act, S. 598, H.R. 1116
- Stop Online Piracy Act, H.R. 3261

See also: Active Legislation, 112th Congress, via senate.gov

== Party summary ==
Resignations and new members are discussed in the "Changes in membership" section, below.

=== Senate ===
Final Senate membership 51 Democrats 47 Republicans 2 Independents, caucusing with Democrats

| | Party (shading indicates majority caucus) | | | Total | Vacant |
| | Democratic | Independent (caucusing with Democrats) | Republican | Total | Vacant |
|---|---|---|---|---|---|
| End of previous Congress | 56 | 2 | 42 | 100 | 0 |
| Begin | 51 | 2 | 47 | 100 | 0 |
| May 3, 2011 | 51 | 2 | 46 | 99 | 1 |
| May 9, 2011 | 51 | 2 | 47 | 100 | 0 |
| December 17, 2012 | 50 | 2 | 47 | 99 | 1 |
| December 26, 2012 | 51 | 2 | 47 | 100 | 0 |
| January 1, 2013 | 51 | 2 | 46 | 99 | 1 |
| January 2, 2013 | 51 | 2 | 47 | 100 | 0 |
| Final voting share | 53% | | 47% | | |
| Beginning of the next Congress | 53 | 2 | 45 | 100 | 0 |

=== House of Representatives ===
Final House membership 191 Democrats 240 Republicans 4 Vacant

| | Party (Shading indicates majority caucus) | | Total | Vacant |
| | Democratic | Republican | Total | Vacant |
|---|---|---|---|---|
| End of previous Congress | 255 | 179 | 434 | 1 |
| Begin | 193 | 242 | 435 | 0 |
| February 9, 2011 | 193 | 241 | 434 | 1 |
| February 28, 2011 | 192 | 241 | 433 | 2 |
| May 9, 2011 | 192 | 240 | 432 | 3 |
| May 24, 2011 | 193 | 240 | 433 | 2 |
| June 21, 2011 | 192 | 240 | 432 | 3 |
| July 12, 2011 | 193 | 240 | 433 | 2 |
| August 3, 2011 | 192 | 240 | 432 | 3 |
| September 13, 2011 | 192 | 242 | 434 | 1 |
| January 25, 2012 | 191 | 242 | 433 | 2 |
| January 31, 2012 | 192 | 242 | 434 | 1 |
| March 6, 2012 | 191 | 242 | 433 | 2 |
| March 20, 2012 | 190 | 242 | 432 | 3 |
| June 12, 2012 | 191 | 242 | 433 | 2 |
| July 7, 2012 | 191 | 241 | 432 | 3 |
| July 31, 2012 | 191 | 240 | 431 | 4 |
| August 15, 2012 | 190 | 240 | 430 | 5 |
| November 13, 2012 | 192 | 241 | 433 | 2 |
| November 15, 2012 | 193 | 241 | 434 | 1 |
| November 21, 2012 | 192 | 241 | 433 | 2 |
| December 3, 2012 | 191 | 241 | 432 | 3 |
| January 2, 2013 | 191 | 240 | 431 | 4 |
| Final voting share | 44.3% | 55.7% | | |
| Non-voting members | 6 | 0 | 6 | 0 |
| Beginning of next Congress | 200 | 233 | 433 | 2 |

== Leadership ==
Section contents: Senate: Majority (D), Minority (R) • House: Majority (R), Minority (D)

=== Senate ===
Senate President

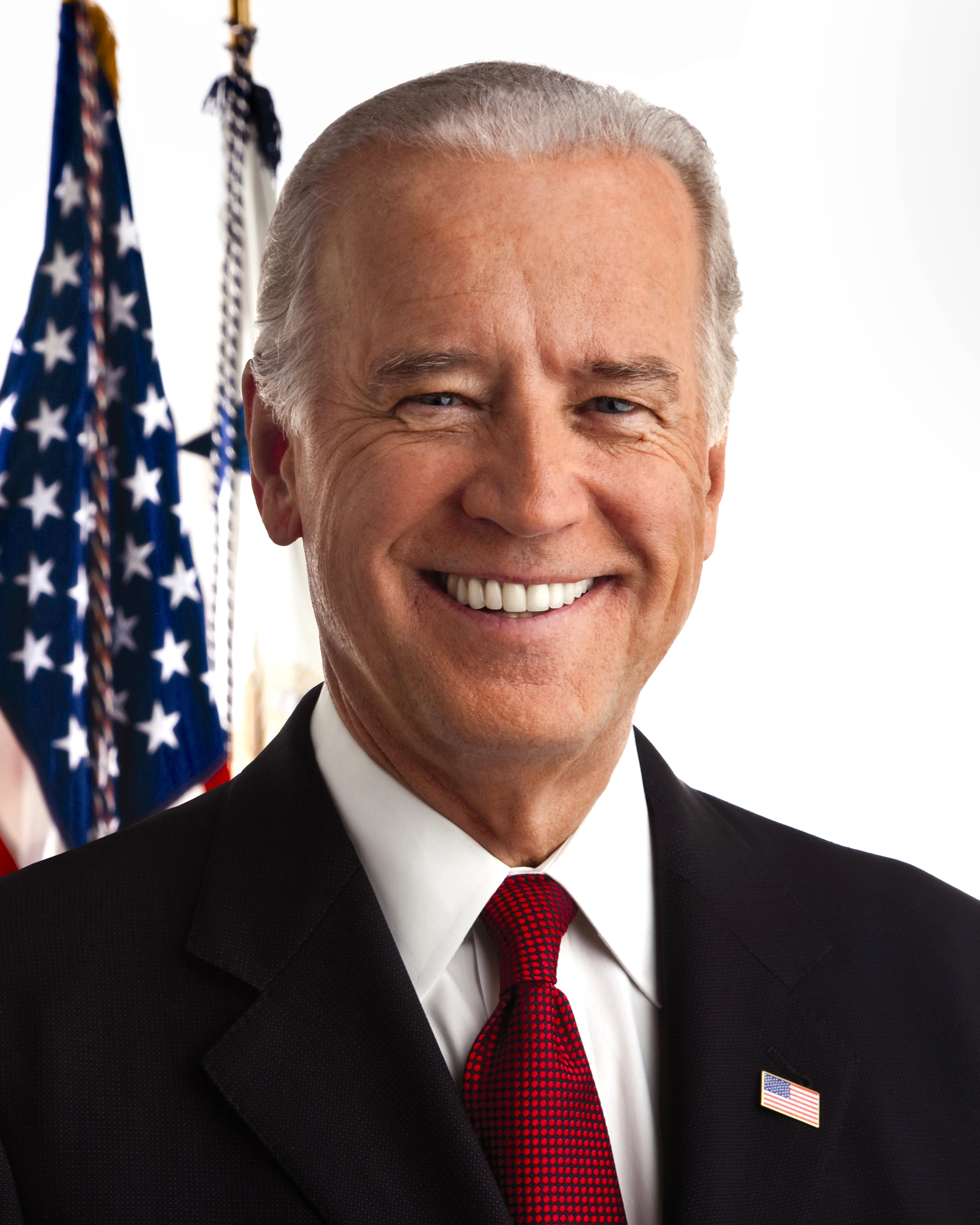
Joe Biden (D)

Senate President pro Tempore

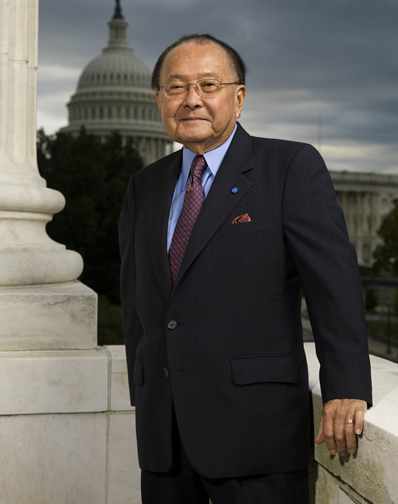
Daniel Inouye (D)
(until December 17, 2012)

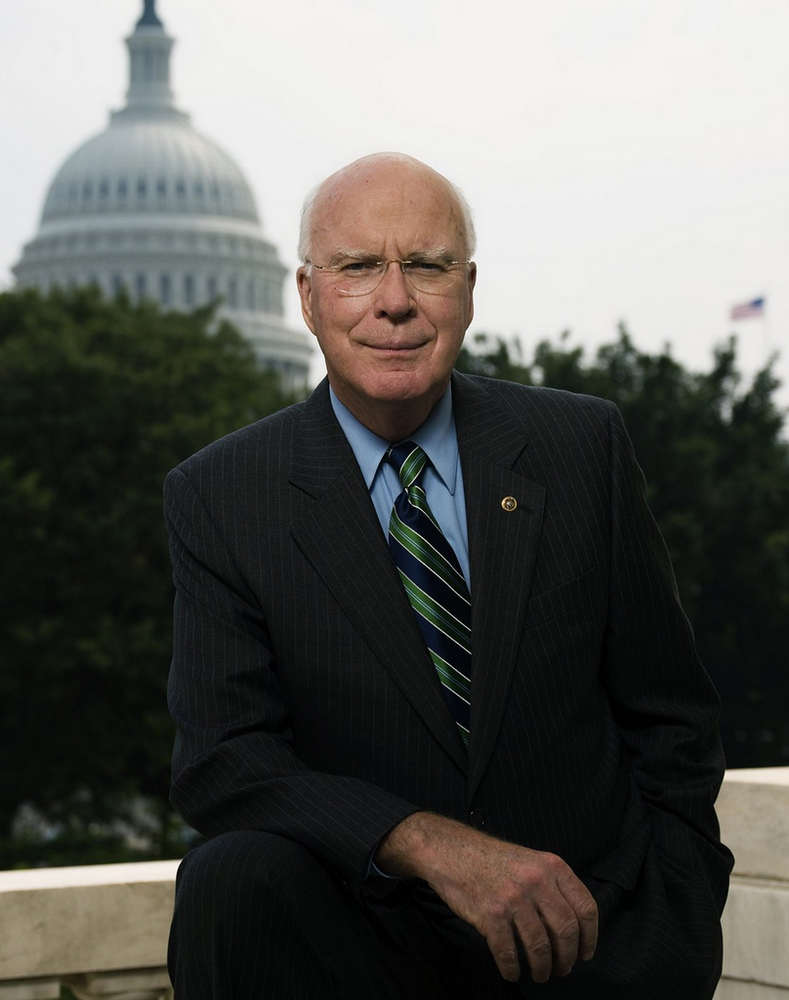
Patrick Leahy (D)
(from December 17, 2012)

- President: Joe Biden (D)
- President pro tempore: Daniel Inouye (D), until December 17, 2012
  - Patrick Leahy (D), from December 17, 2012

==== Majority (Democratic) leadership ====
- Majority Leader and Caucus Chair: Harry Reid
- Assistant Majority Leader (Majority Whip): Dick Durbin
- Democratic Caucus Vice Chairman and Policy Committee Chairman: Chuck Schumer
- Senatorial Campaign Committee Chairman and Caucus Secretary: Patty Murray
- Policy Committee Vice Chairman: Debbie Stabenow
- Steering and Outreach Committee Chairman: Mark Begich
- Steering and Outreach Committee Vice Chairman: Daniel Akaka
- Chief Deputy Whip: Barbara Boxer

==== Minority (Republican) leadership ====
- Minority Leader: Mitch McConnell
- Assistant Minority Leader (Minority Whip): Jon Kyl
- Republican Conference Chairman: Lamar Alexander, until 2012
  - John Thune, from 2012
- Policy Committee Chairman: John Thune, until 2012
  - John Barrasso, from 2012
- Republican Conference Vice Chairman: John Barrasso, until 2012
  - Roy Blunt, from 2012
- National Senatorial Committee Chair: John Cornyn
- Deputy Whips: Roy Blunt, Richard Burr, Mike Crapo, Saxby Chambliss, Rob Portman, Olympia Snowe, David Vitter, Roger Wicker

=== House of Representatives ===
Speaker of the House

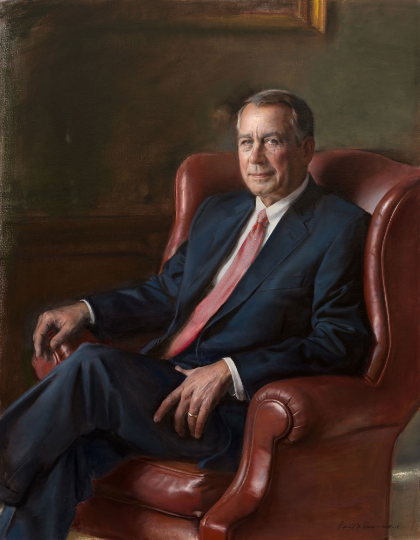
John Boehner (R)

- Speaker: John Boehner (R)

==== Majority (Republican) leadership ====
- Majority Leader: Eric Cantor
- Majority Whip: Kevin McCarthy
- Majority Chief Deputy Whip: Peter Roskam
- House Rules Committee Chairman: David Dreier
- Republican Conference Chairman: Jeb Hensarling
- Republican Campaign Committee Chairman: Pete Sessions
- Policy Committee Chairman: Tom Price
- Republican Conference Vice-Chairman: Cathy McMorris Rodgers
- Republican Conference Secretary: John Carter
- Campaign Committee Deputy Chairman: Greg Walden

==== Minority (Democratic) leadership ====
- Minority Leader: Nancy Pelosi
- Minority Whip: Steny Hoyer
- Assistant Democratic Leader: Jim Clyburn
- Senior Chief Deputy Minority Whip: John Lewis
- Chief Deputy Minority Whips: Maxine Waters, Jim Matheson, Ed Pastor, Jan Schakowsky, Joseph Crowley, Diana DeGette, G. K. Butterfield, Debbie Wasserman Schultz, Peter Welch
- Democratic Caucus Chairman: John B. Larson
- Democratic Caucus Vice-Chairman: Xavier Becerra
- Democratic Campaign Committee Chairman: Steve Israel
- Steering/Policy Committee Co-Chairs: Rosa DeLauro and George Miller
- Organization, Study, and Review Chairman: Mike Capuano

== Members ==
For the first time in the history of Congress, over half its members were millionaires as of 2012; Democrats had a median net worth of $1.04 million, while the Republicans median was "almost exactly" $1.00 million. In this Congress, Class 1 meant their term ended with this Congress, requiring reelection in 2012; Class 2 meant their term began in the last Congress, requiring reelection in 2014; and Class 3 meant their term began in this Congress, requiring reelection in 2016.

=== Senate ===
==== Alabama ====
▌2. Jeff Sessions (R)
▌3. Richard Shelby (R)

==== Alaska ====
▌2. Mark Begich (D)
▌3. Lisa Murkowski (R)

==== Arizona ====
▌1. Jon Kyl (R)
▌3. John McCain (R)

==== Arkansas ====
▌2. Mark Pryor (D)
▌3. John Boozman (R)

==== California ====
▌1. Dianne Feinstein (D)
▌3. Barbara Boxer (D)

==== Colorado ====
▌2. Mark Udall (D)
▌3. Michael Bennet (D)

==== Connecticut ====
▌1. Joe Lieberman (ID)
▌3. Richard Blumenthal (D)

==== Delaware ====
▌1. Tom Carper (D)
▌2. Chris Coons (D)

==== Florida ====
▌1. Bill Nelson (D)
▌3. Marco Rubio (R)

==== Georgia ====
▌2. Saxby Chambliss (R)
▌3. Johnny Isakson (R)

==== Hawaii ====
▌1. Daniel Akaka (D)
▌3. Daniel Inouye (D), until December 17, 2012

▌Brian Schatz (D), from December 26, 2012

==== Idaho ====
▌2. Jim Risch (R)
▌3. Mike Crapo (R)

==== Illinois ====
▌2. Dick Durbin (D)
▌3. Mark Kirk (R)

==== Indiana ====
▌1. Richard Lugar (R)
▌3. Dan Coats (R)

==== Iowa ====
▌2. Tom Harkin (D)
▌3. Chuck Grassley (R)

==== Kansas ====
▌2. Pat Roberts (R)
▌3. Jerry Moran (R)

==== Kentucky ====
▌2. Mitch McConnell (R)
▌3. Rand Paul (R)

==== Louisiana ====
▌2. Mary Landrieu (D)
▌3. David Vitter (R)

==== Maine ====
▌1. Olympia Snowe (R)
▌2. Susan Collins (R)

==== Maryland ====
▌1. Ben Cardin (D)
▌3. Barbara Mikulski (D)

==== Massachusetts ====
▌1. Scott Brown (R)
▌2. John Kerry (D)

==== Michigan ====
▌1. Debbie Stabenow (D)
▌2. Carl Levin (D)

==== Minnesota ====
▌1. Amy Klobuchar (DFL) (Note: The Minnesota Democratic–Farmer–Labor Party (DFL) and the North Dakota Democratic-Nonpartisan League Party (D-NPL) are the Minnesota and North Dakota affiliates of the U.S. Democratic Party and are counted as Democrats.)
▌2. Al Franken (DFL)

==== Mississippi ====
▌1. Roger Wicker (R)
▌2. Thad Cochran (R)

==== Missouri ====
▌1. Claire McCaskill (D)
▌3. Roy Blunt (R)

==== Montana ====
▌1. Jon Tester (D)
▌2. Max Baucus (D)

==== Nebraska ====
▌1. Ben Nelson (D)
▌2. Mike Johanns (R)

==== Nevada ====
▌1. John Ensign (R), until May 3, 2011

▌Dean Heller (R), from May 9, 2011

▌3. Harry Reid (D)

==== New Hampshire ====
▌2. Jeanne Shaheen (D)
▌3. Kelly Ayotte (R)

==== New Jersey ====
▌1. Bob Menendez (D)
▌2. Frank Lautenberg (D)

==== New Mexico ====
▌1. Jeff Bingaman (D)
▌2. Tom Udall (D)

==== New York ====
▌1. Kirsten Gillibrand (D)
▌3. Charles Schumer (D)

==== North Carolina ====
▌2. Kay Hagan (D)
▌3. Richard Burr (R)

==== North Dakota ====
▌1. Kent Conrad (D-NPL)
▌3. John Hoeven (R)

==== Ohio ====
▌1. Sherrod Brown (D)
▌3. Rob Portman (R)

==== Oklahoma ====
▌2. Jim Inhofe (R)
▌3. Tom Coburn (R)

==== Oregon ====
▌2. Jeff Merkley (D)
▌3. Ron Wyden (D)

==== Pennsylvania ====
▌1. Bob Casey Jr. (D)
▌3. Pat Toomey (R)

==== Rhode Island ====
▌1. Sheldon Whitehouse (D)
▌2. Jack Reed (D)

==== South Carolina ====
▌2. Lindsey Graham (R)
▌3. Jim DeMint (R), until January 2, 2013

▌Tim Scott (R), from January 2, 2013

==== South Dakota ====
▌2. Tim Johnson (D)
▌3. John Thune (R)

==== Tennessee ====
▌1. Bob Corker (R)
▌2. Lamar Alexander (R)

==== Texas ====
▌1. Kay Bailey Hutchison (R)
▌2. John Cornyn (R)

==== Utah ====
▌1. Orrin Hatch (R)
▌3. Mike Lee (R)

==== Vermont ====
▌1. Bernie Sanders (I)
▌3. Patrick Leahy (D)

==== Virginia ====
▌1. Jim Webb (D)
▌2. Mark Warner (D)

==== Washington ====
▌1. Maria Cantwell (D)
▌3. Patty Murray (D)

==== West Virginia ====
▌1. Joe Manchin (D)
▌2. Jay Rockefeller (D)

==== Wisconsin ====
▌1. Herb Kohl (D)
▌3. Ron Johnson (R)

==== Wyoming ====
▌1. John Barrasso (R)
▌2. Mike Enzi (R)

Party membership by state 2 Democrats 1 Democrat and 1 Republican 2 Republicans 1 Independent (caucuses with Democrats) and 1 Democrat

Senate Majority Leaders

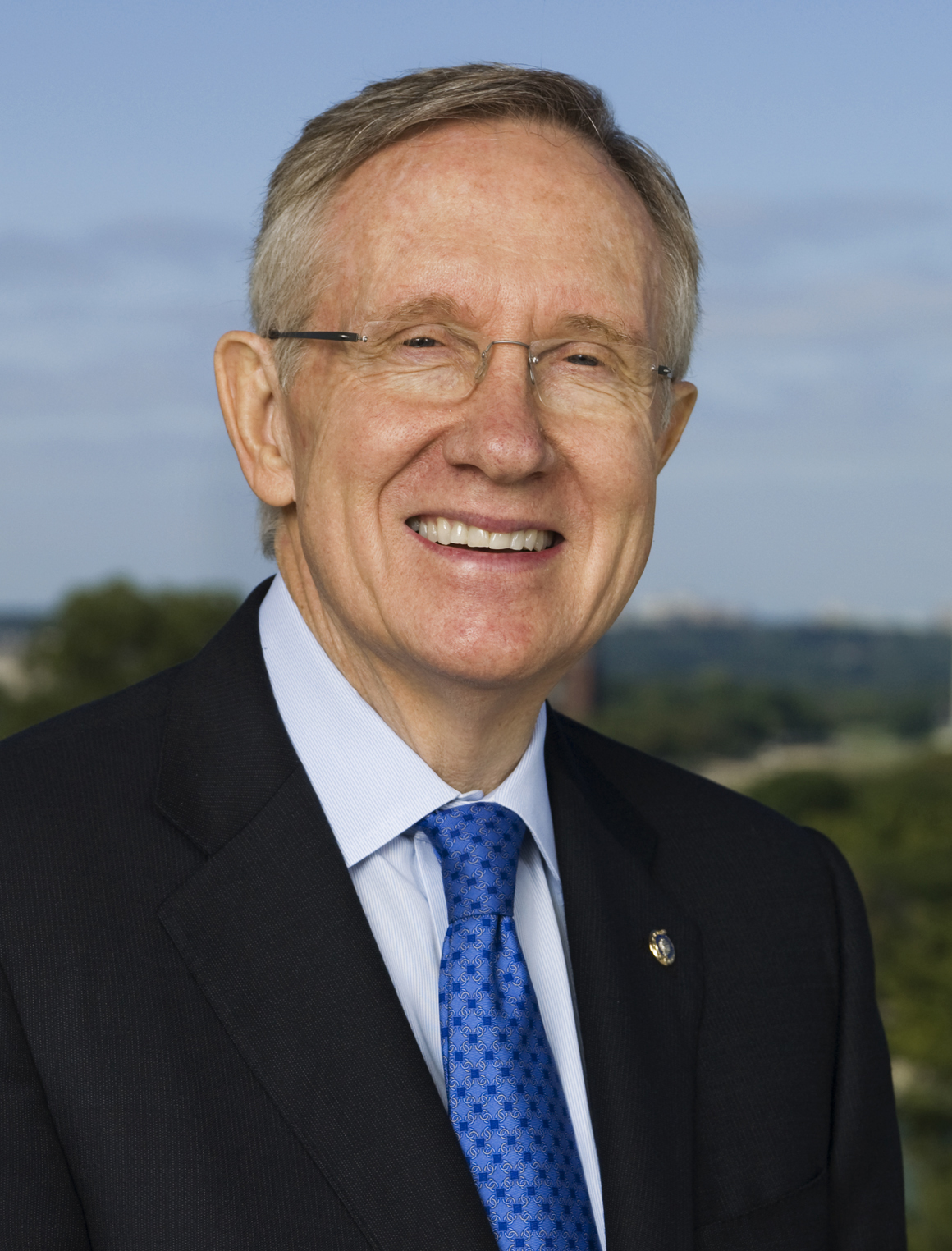
Democratic Leader
Harry Reid

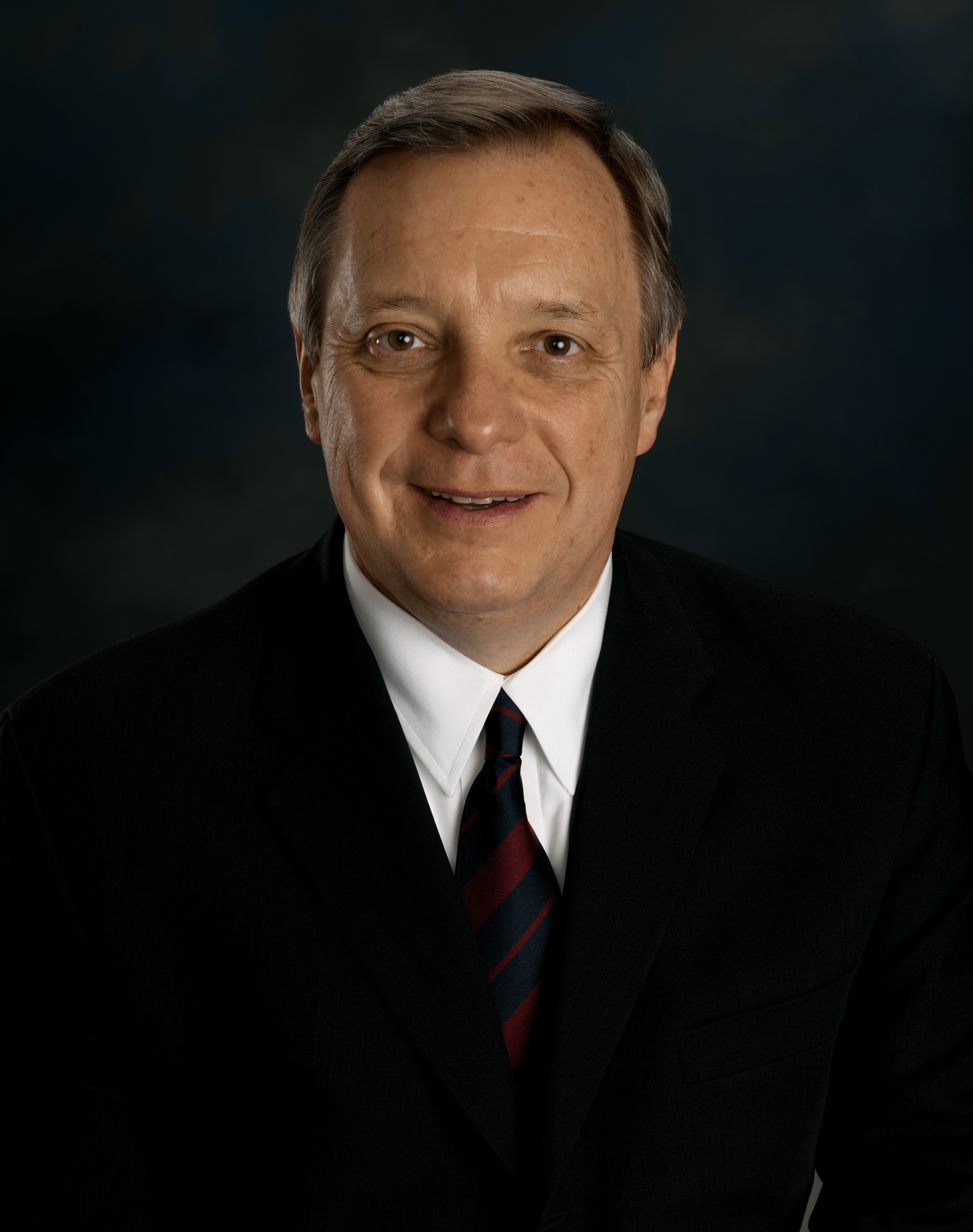
Democratic Whip
Dick Durbin

Senate Minority Leaders

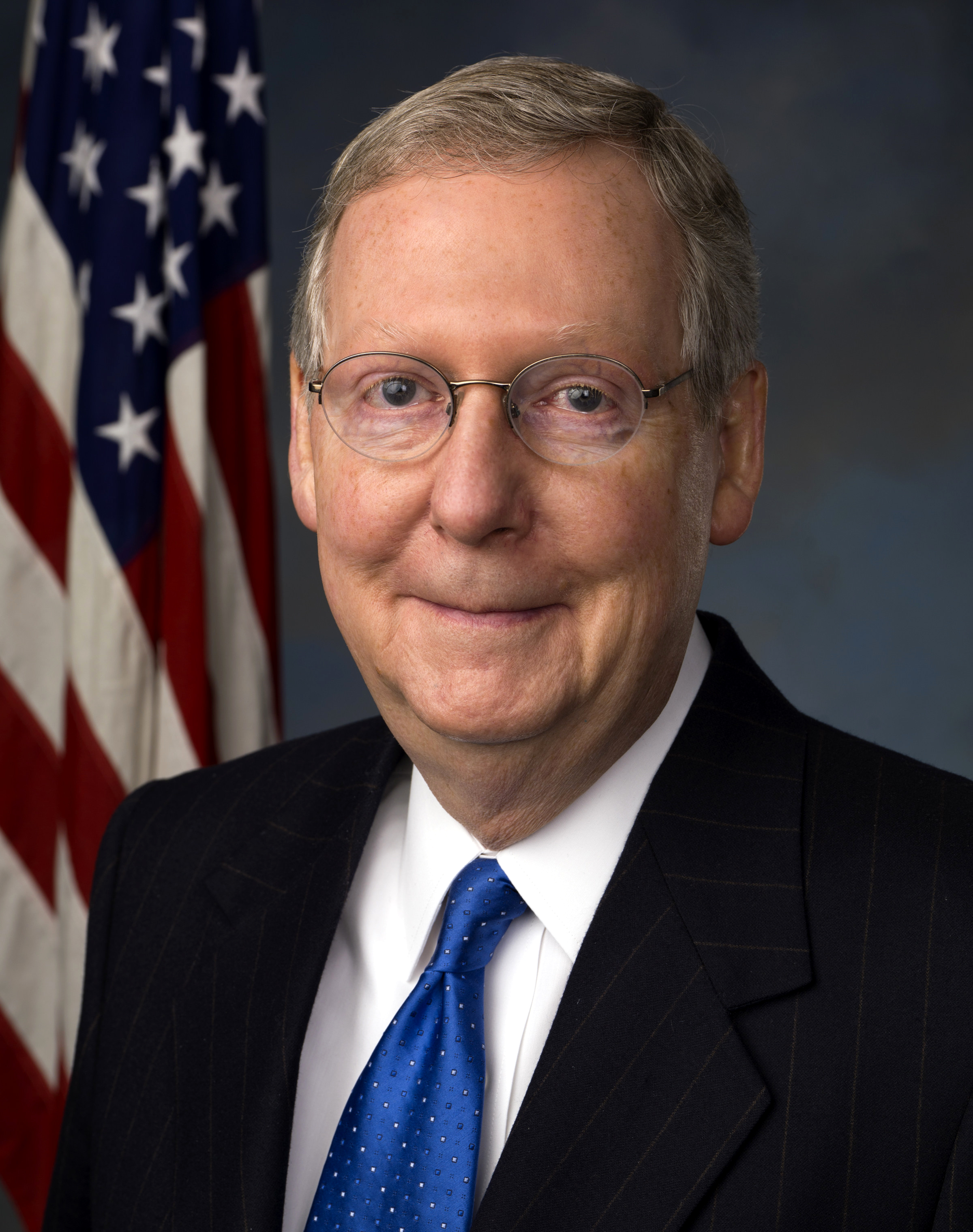
Republican Leader
Mitch McConnell

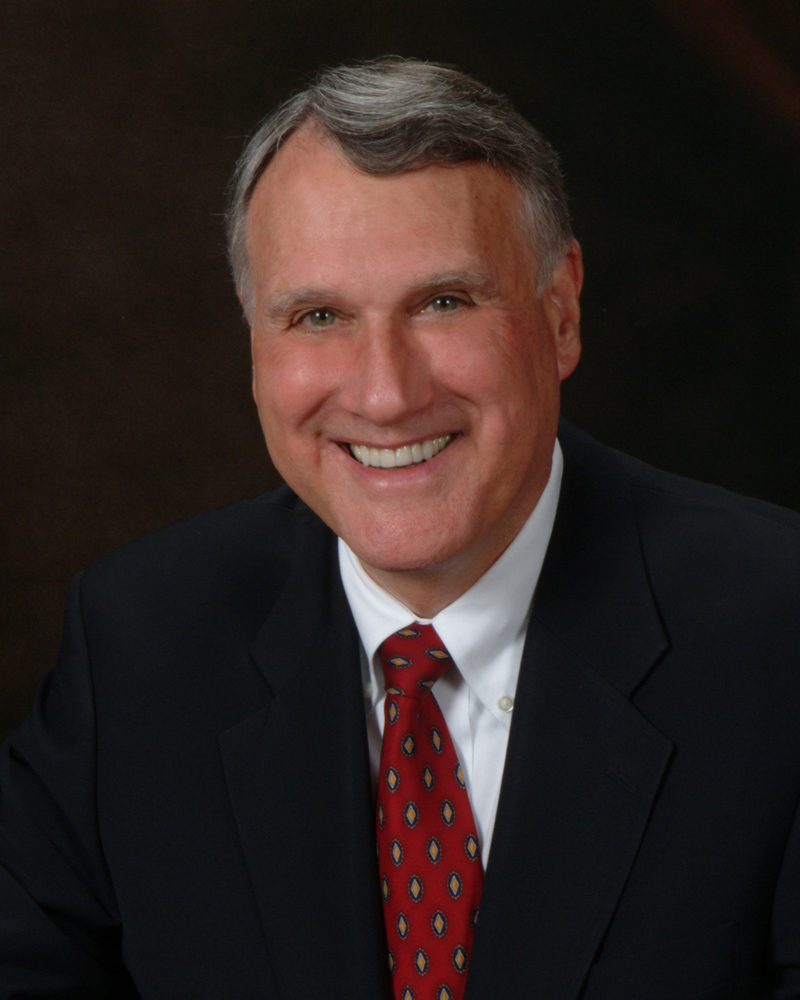
Republican Whip
Jon Kyl

=== House of Representatives ===
==== Alabama ====
▌1. Jo Bonner (R)
▌2. Martha Roby (R)
▌3. Mike Rogers (R)
▌4. Robert Aderholt (R)
▌5. Mo Brooks (R)
▌6. Spencer Bachus (R)
▌7. Terri Sewell (D)

==== Alaska ====
▌At-large. Don Young (R)

==== Arizona ====
▌1. Paul Gosar (R)
▌2. Trent Franks (R)
▌3. Ben Quayle (R)
▌4. Ed Pastor (D)
▌5. David Schweikert (R)
▌6. Jeff Flake (R)
▌7. Raúl Grijalva (D)
▌8. Gabby Giffords (D), until January 25, 2012

▌Ron Barber (D), from June 12, 2012

==== Arkansas ====
▌1. Rick Crawford (R)
▌2. Tim Griffin (R)
▌3. Steve Womack (R)
▌4. Mike Ross (D)

==== California ====
▌1. Mike Thompson (D)
▌2. Wally Herger (R)
▌3. Dan Lungren (R)
▌4. Tom McClintock (R)
▌5. Doris Matsui (D)
▌6. Lynn Woolsey (D)
▌7. George Miller (D)
▌8. Nancy Pelosi (D)
▌9. Barbara Lee (D)
▌10. John Garamendi (D)
▌11. Jerry McNerney (D)
▌12. Jackie Speier (D)
▌13. Pete Stark (D)
▌14. Anna Eshoo (D)
▌15. Mike Honda (D)
▌16. Zoe Lofgren (D)
▌17. Sam Farr (D)
▌18. Dennis Cardoza (D), until August 15, 2012

Vacant from August 15, 2012

▌19. Jeff Denham (R)
▌20. Jim Costa (D)
▌21. Devin Nunes (R)
▌22. Kevin McCarthy (R)
▌23. Lois Capps (D)
▌24. Elton Gallegly (R)
▌25. Howard McKeon (R)
▌26. David Dreier (R)
▌27. Brad Sherman (D)
▌28. Howard Berman (D)
▌29. Adam Schiff (D)
▌30. Henry Waxman (D)
▌31. Xavier Becerra (D)
▌32. Judy Chu (D)
▌33. Karen Bass (D)
▌34. Lucille Roybal-Allard (D)
▌35. Maxine Waters (D)
▌36. Jane Harman (D), until February 28, 2011

▌Janice Hahn (D), from July 12, 2011

▌37. Laura Richardson (D)
▌38. Grace Napolitano (D)
▌39. Linda Sanchez (D)
▌40. Ed Royce (R)
▌41. Jerry Lewis (R)
▌42. Gary Miller (R)
▌43. Joe Baca (D)
▌44. Ken Calvert (R)
▌45. Mary Bono Mack (R)
▌46. Dana Rohrabacher (R)
▌47. Loretta Sanchez (D)
▌48. John Campbell (R)
▌49. Darrell Issa (R)
▌50. Brian Bilbray (R)
▌51. Bob Filner (D), until December 3, 2012

Vacant from December 3, 2012

▌52. Duncan D. Hunter (R)
▌53. Susan Davis (D)

==== Colorado ====
▌1. Diana DeGette (D)
▌2. Jared Polis (D)
▌3. Scott Tipton (R)
▌4. Cory Gardner (R)
▌5. Doug Lamborn (R)
▌6. Mike Coffman (R)
▌7. Ed Perlmutter (D)

==== Connecticut ====
▌1. John Larson (D)
▌2. Joe Courtney (D)
▌3. Rosa DeLauro (D)
▌4. Jim Himes (D)
▌5. Chris Murphy (D)

==== Delaware ====
▌At-large. John Carney (D)

==== Florida ====
▌1. Jeff Miller (R)
▌2. Steve Southerland (R)
▌3. Corrine Brown (D)
▌4. Ander Crenshaw (R)
▌5. Rich Nugent (R)
▌6. Cliff Stearns (R)
▌7. John Mica (R)
▌8. Daniel Webster (R)
▌9. Gus Bilirakis (R)
▌10. Bill Young (R)
▌11. Kathy Castor (D)
▌12. Dennis Ross (R)
▌13. Vern Buchanan (R)
▌14. Connie Mack (R)
▌15. Bill Posey (R)
▌16. Tom Rooney (R)
▌17. Frederica Wilson (D)
▌18. Ileana Ros-Lehtinen (R)
▌19. Ted Deutch (D)
▌20. Debbie Wasserman Schultz (D)
▌21. Mario Diaz-Balart (R)
▌22. Allen West (R)
▌23. Alcee Hastings (D)
▌24. Sandy Adams (R)
▌25. David Rivera (R)

==== Georgia ====
▌1. Jack Kingston (R)
▌2. Sanford Bishop (D)
▌3. Lynn Westmoreland (R)
▌4. Hank Johnson (D)
▌5. John Lewis (D)
▌6. Tom Price (R)
▌7. Rob Woodall (R)
▌8. Austin Scott (R)
▌9. Tom Graves (R)
▌10. Paul Broun (R)
▌11. Phil Gingrey (R)
▌12. John Barrow (D)
▌13. David Scott (D)

==== Hawaii ====
▌1. Colleen Hanabusa (D)
▌2. Mazie Hirono (D)

==== Idaho ====
▌1. Raul Labrador (R)
▌2. Mike Simpson (R)

==== Illinois ====
▌1. Bobby Rush (D)
▌2. Jesse Jackson Jr. (D), until November 21, 2012.

Vacant from November 21, 2012

▌3. Dan Lipinski (D)
▌4. Luis Gutierrez (D)
▌5. Mike Quigley (D)
▌6. Peter Roskam (R)
▌7. Danny Davis (D)
▌8. Joe Walsh (R)
▌9. Jan Schakowsky (D)
▌10. Bob Dold (R)
▌11. Adam Kinzinger (R)
▌12. Jerry Costello (D)
▌13. Judy Biggert (R)
▌14. Randy Hultgren (R)
▌15. Tim Johnson (R)
▌16. Don Manzullo (R)
▌17. Bobby Schilling (R)
▌18. Aaron Schock (R)
▌19. John Shimkus (R)

==== Indiana ====
▌1. Pete Visclosky (D)
▌2. Joe Donnelly (D)
▌3. Marlin Stutzman (R)
▌4. Todd Rokita (R)
▌5. Dan Burton (R)
▌6. Mike Pence (R)
▌7. André Carson (D)
▌8. Larry Bucshon (R)
▌9. Todd Young (R)

==== Iowa ====
▌1. Bruce Braley (D)
▌2. David Loebsack (D)
▌3. Leonard Boswell (D)
▌4. Tom Latham (R)
▌5. Steve King (R)

==== Kansas ====
▌1. Tim Huelskamp (R)
▌2. Lynn Jenkins (R)
▌3. Kevin Yoder (R)
▌4. Mike Pompeo (R)

==== Kentucky ====
▌1. Ed Whitfield (R)
▌2. Brett Guthrie (R)
▌3. John Yarmuth (D)
▌4. Geoff Davis (R), until July 31, 2012

▌Thomas Massie (R), from November 13, 2012

▌5. Hal Rogers (R)
▌6. Ben Chandler (D)

==== Louisiana ====
▌1. Steve Scalise (R)
▌2. Cedric Richmond (D)
▌3. Jeff Landry (R)
▌4. John Fleming (R)
▌5. Rodney Alexander (R)
▌6. Bill Cassidy (R)
▌7. Charles Boustany (R)

==== Maine ====
▌1. Chellie Pingree (D)
▌2. Mike Michaud (D)

==== Maryland ====
▌1. Andrew Harris (R)
▌2. Dutch Ruppersberger (D)
▌3. John Sarbanes (D)
▌4. Donna Edwards (D)
▌5. Steny Hoyer (D)
▌6. Roscoe Bartlett (R)
▌7. Elijah Cummings (D)
▌8. Chris Van Hollen (D)

==== Massachusetts ====
▌1. John Olver (D)
▌2. Richard Neal (D)
▌3. Jim McGovern (D)
▌4. Barney Frank (D)
▌5. Niki Tsongas (D)
▌6. John Tierney (D)
▌7. Ed Markey (D)
▌8. Mike Capuano (D)
▌9. Stephen Lynch (D)
▌10. William Keating (D)

==== Michigan ====
▌1. Dan Benishek (R)
▌2. Bill Huizenga (R)
▌3. Justin Amash (R)
▌4. Dave Camp (R)
▌5. Dale Kildee (D)
▌6. Fred Upton (R)
▌7. Tim Walberg (R)
▌8. Mike Rogers (R)
▌9. Gary Peters (D)
▌10. Candice Miller (R)
▌11. Thaddeus McCotter (R) until July 6, 2012

▌David Curson (D) from November 13, 2012

▌12. Sander Levin (D)
▌13. Hansen Clarke (D)
▌14. John Conyers (D)
▌15. John Dingell (D)

==== Minnesota ====
▌1. Tim Walz (DFL)
▌2. John Kline (R)
▌3. Erik Paulsen (R)
▌4. Betty McCollum (DFL)
▌5. Keith Ellison (DFL)
▌6. Michele Bachmann (R)
▌7. Collin Peterson (DFL)
▌8. Chip Cravaack (R)

==== Mississippi ====
▌1. Alan Nunnelee (R)
▌2. Bennie Thompson (D)
▌3. Gregg Harper (R)
▌4. Steven Palazzo (R)

==== Missouri ====
▌1. Lacy Clay (D)
▌2. Todd Akin (R)
▌3. Russ Carnahan (D)
▌4. Vicky Hartzler (R)
▌5. Emanuel Cleaver (D)
▌6. Sam Graves (R)
▌7. Bill Long (R)
▌8. Jo Ann Emerson (R)
▌9. Blaine Luetkemeyer (R)

==== Montana ====
▌At-large. Denny Rehberg (R)

==== Nebraska ====
▌1. Jeff Fortenberry (R)
▌2. Lee Terry (R)
▌3. Adrian Smith (R)

==== Nevada ====
▌1. Shelley Berkley (D)
▌2. Dean Heller (R), until May 9, 2011

▌Mark Amodei (R), from September 13, 2011

▌3. Joe Heck (R)

==== New Hampshire ====
▌1. Frank Guinta (R)
▌2. Charles Bass (R)

==== New Jersey ====
▌1. Rob Andrews (D)
▌2. Frank LoBiondo (R)
▌3. Jon Runyan (R)
▌4. Chris Smith (R)
▌5. Scott Garrett (R)
▌6. Frank Pallone (D)
▌7. Leonard Lance (R)
▌8. Bill Pascrell (D)
▌9. Steve Rothman (D)
▌10. Donald Payne (D), until March 6, 2012

▌Donald Payne Jr. (D), from November 15, 2012

▌11. Rodney Frelinghuysen (R)
▌12. Rush Holt Jr. (D)
▌13. Albio Sires (D)

==== New Mexico ====
▌1. Martin Heinrich (D)
▌2. Steve Pearce (R)
▌3. Ben Lujan (D)

==== New York ====
▌1. Tim Bishop (D)
▌2. Steve Israel (D)
▌3. Peter King (R)
▌4. Carolyn McCarthy (D)
▌5. Gary Ackerman (D)
▌6. Gregory Meeks (D)
▌7. Joseph Crowley (D)
▌8. Jerrold Nadler (D)
▌9. Anthony Weiner (D), until June 21, 2011

▌Bob Turner (R), from September 13, 2011

▌10. Edolphus Towns (D)
▌11. Yvette Clarke (D)
▌12. Nydia Velazquez (D)
▌13. Michael Grimm (R)
▌14. Carolyn Maloney (D)
▌15. Charles Rangel (D)
▌16. José E. Serrano (D)
▌17. Eliot Engel (D)
▌18. Nita Lowey (D)
▌19. Nan Hayworth (R)
▌20. Chris Gibson (R)
▌21. Paul Tonko (D)
▌22. Maurice Hinchey (D)
▌23. Bill Owens (D)
▌24. Richard Hanna (R)
▌25. Ann Marie Buerkle (R)
▌26. Chris Lee (R), until February 9, 2011

▌Kathy Hochul (D), from May 24, 2011

▌27. Brian Higgins (D)
▌28. Louise Slaughter (D)
▌29. Tom Reed (R)

==== North Carolina ====
▌1. G. K. Butterfield (D)
▌2. Renee Ellmers (R)
▌3. Walter B. Jones Jr. (R)
▌4. David Price (D)
▌5. Virginia Foxx (R)
▌6. Howard Coble (R)
▌7. Mike McIntyre (D)
▌8. Larry Kissell (D)
▌9. Sue Myrick (R)
▌10. Patrick McHenry (R)
▌11. Heath Shuler (D)
▌12. Mel Watt (D)
▌13. Brad Miller (D)

==== North Dakota ====
▌At-large. Rick Berg (R)

==== Ohio ====
▌1. Steve Chabot (R)
▌2. Jean Schmidt (R)
▌3. Mike Turner (R)
▌4. Jim Jordan (R)
▌5. Bob Latta (R)
▌6. Bill Johnson (R)
▌7. Steve Austria (R)
▌8. John Boehner (R)
▌9. Marcy Kaptur (D)
▌10. Dennis Kucinich (D)
▌11. Marcia Fudge (D)
▌12. Pat Tiberi (R)
▌13. Betty Sutton (D)
▌14. Steve LaTourette (R)
▌15. Steve Stivers (R)
▌16. Jim Renacci (R)
▌17. Tim Ryan (D)
▌18. Bob Gibbs (R)

==== Oklahoma ====
▌1. John Sullivan (R)
▌2. Dan Boren (D)
▌3. Frank Lucas (R)
▌4. Tom Cole (R)
▌5. James Lankford (R)

==== Oregon ====
▌1. David Wu (D), until August 3, 2011

▌Suzanne Bonamici (D), from January 31, 2012

▌2. Greg Walden (R)
▌3. Earl Blumenauer (D)
▌4. Peter DeFazio (D)
▌5. Kurt Schrader (D)

==== Pennsylvania ====
▌1. Bob Brady (D)
▌2. Chaka Fattah (D)
▌3. Mike Kelly (R)
▌4. Jason Altmire (D)
▌5. Glenn Thompson (R)
▌6. Jim Gerlach (R)
▌7. Pat Meehan (R)
▌8. Mike Fitzpatrick (R)
▌9. Bill Shuster (R)
▌10. Tom Marino (R)
▌11. Lou Barletta (R)
▌12. Mark Critz (D)
▌13. Allyson Schwartz (D)
▌14. Michael Doyle (D)
▌15. Charlie Dent (R)
▌16. Joseph Pitts (R)
▌17. Tim Holden (D)
▌18. Timothy Murphy (R)
▌19. Todd Platts (R)

==== Rhode Island ====
▌1. David Cicilline (D)
▌2. James Langevin (D)

==== South Carolina ====
▌1. Tim Scott (R), until January 2, 2013

Vacant from January 2, 2013

▌2. Joe Wilson (R)
▌3. Jeff Duncan (R)
▌4. Trey Gowdy (R)
▌5. Mick Mulvaney (R)
▌6. Jim Clyburn (D)

==== South Dakota ====
▌At-large. Kristi Noem (R)

==== Tennessee ====
▌1. Phil Roe (R)
▌2. Jimmy Duncan (R)
▌3. Chuck Fleischmann (R)
▌4. Scott DesJarlais (R)
▌5. Jim Cooper (D)
▌6. Diane Black (R)
▌7. Marsha Blackburn (R)
▌8. Stephen Fincher (R)
▌9. Steve Cohen (D)

==== Texas ====
▌1. Louie Gohmert (R)
▌2. Ted Poe (R)
▌3. Sam Johnson (R)
▌4. Ralph Hall (R)
▌5. Jeb Hensarling (R)
▌6. Joe Barton (R)
▌7. John Culberson (R)
▌8. Kevin Brady (R)
▌9. Al Green (D)
▌10. Michael McCaul (R)
▌11. Mike Conaway (R)
▌12. Kay Granger (R)
▌13. Mac Thornberry (R)
▌14. Ron Paul (R)
▌15. Ruben Hinojosa (D)
▌16. Silvestre Reyes (D)
▌17. Bill Flores (R)
▌18. Sheila Jackson Lee (D)
▌19. Randy Neugebauer (R)
▌20. Charlie Gonzalez (D)
▌21. Lamar Smith (R)
▌22. Pete Olson (R)
▌23. Quico Canseco (R)
▌24. Kenny Marchant (R)
▌25. Lloyd Doggett (D)
▌26. Michael Burgess (R)
▌27. Blake Farenthold (R)
▌28. Henry Cuellar (D)
▌29. Gene Green (D)
▌30. Eddie Bernice Johnson (D)
▌31. John Carter (R)
▌32. Pete Sessions (R)

==== Utah ====
▌1. Rob Bishop (R)
▌2. Jim Matheson (D)
▌3. Jason Chaffetz (R)

==== Vermont ====
▌At-large. Peter Welch (D)

==== Virginia ====
▌1. Rob Wittman (R)
▌2. Scott Rigell (R)
▌3. Bobby Scott (D)
▌4. Randy Forbes (R)
▌5. Robert Hurt (R)
▌6. Bob Goodlatte (R)
▌7. Eric Cantor (R)
▌8. Jim Moran (D)
▌9. Morgan Griffith (R)
▌10. Frank Wolf (R)
▌11. Gerry Connolly (D)

==== Washington ====
▌1. Jay Inslee (D), until March 20, 2012

▌Suzan DelBene (D), from November 13, 2012

▌2. Rick Larsen (D)
▌3. Jaime Herrera Beutler (R)
▌4. Doc Hastings (R)
▌5. Cathy McMorris Rodgers (R)
▌6. Norman Dicks (D)
▌7. Jim McDermott (D)
▌8. Dave Reichert (R)
▌9. Adam Smith (D)

==== West Virginia ====
▌1. David McKinley (R)
▌2. Shelley Moore Capito (R)
▌3. Nick Rahall (D)

==== Wisconsin ====
▌1. Paul Ryan (R)
▌2. Tammy Baldwin (D)
▌3. Ron Kind (D)
▌4. Gwen Moore (D)
▌5. Jim Sensenbrenner (R)
▌6. Tom Petri (R)
▌7. Sean Duffy (R)
▌8. Reid Ribble (R)

==== Wyoming ====
▌At-large. Cynthia Lummis (R)

==== Non-voting members ====
▌American Samoa. Eni Faleomavaega (D)
▌District of Columbia. Eleanor Holmes Norton (D)
▌Guam. Madeleine Bordallo (D)
▌Northern Mariana Islands. Gregorio Sablan (D)
▌Puerto Rico. Pedro Pierluisi (Resident Commissioner) (D/NPP)
▌U.S. Virgin Islands. Donna Christian-Christensen (D)

Percentage of members from each party by state, ranging from dark blue (most Democratic) to dark red (most Republican).

Members' party membership by district. Democratic Republican

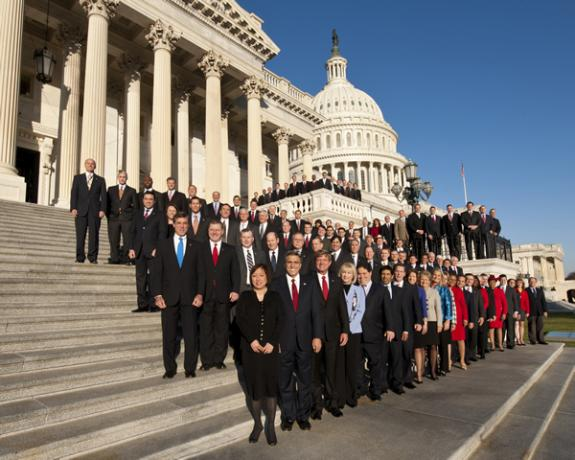
Freshman class of the House of Representatives, January 2011

House majority leadership

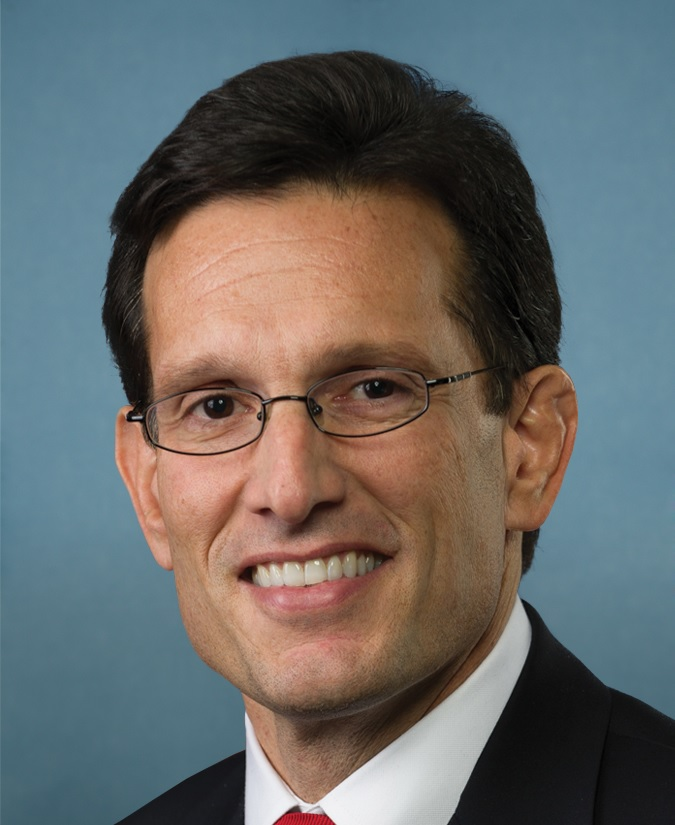
Republican leader
Eric Cantor

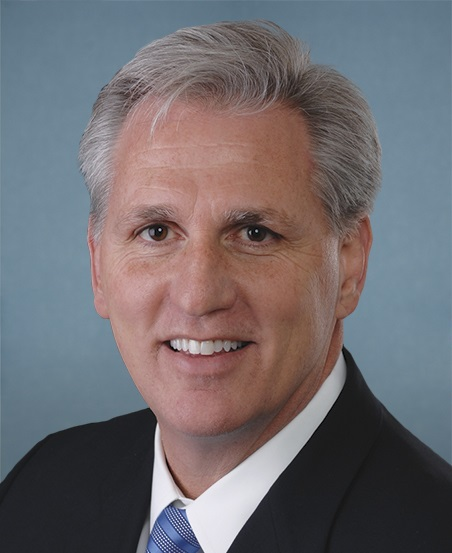
Republican whip
Kevin McCarthy

House minority leadership

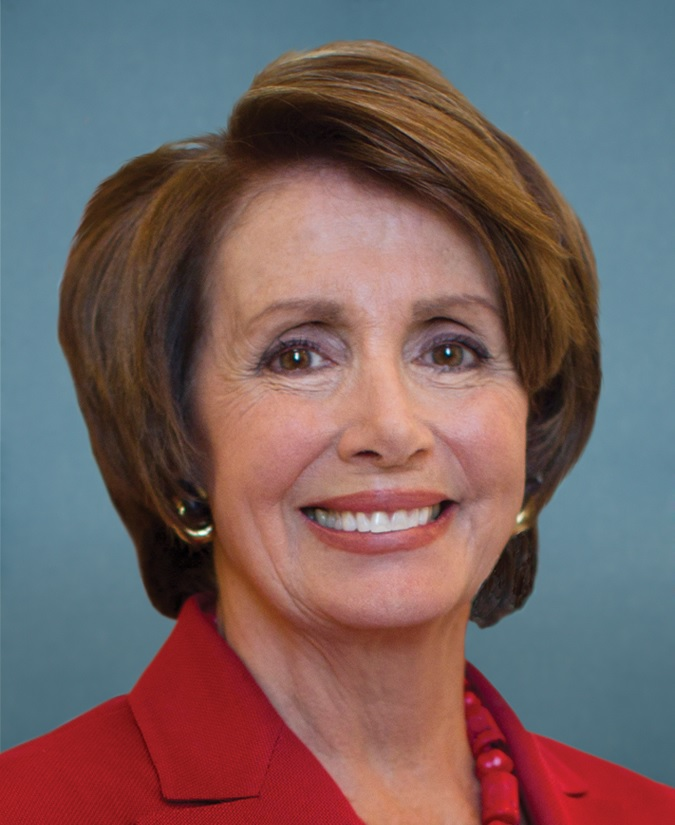
Democratic leader
Nancy Pelosi

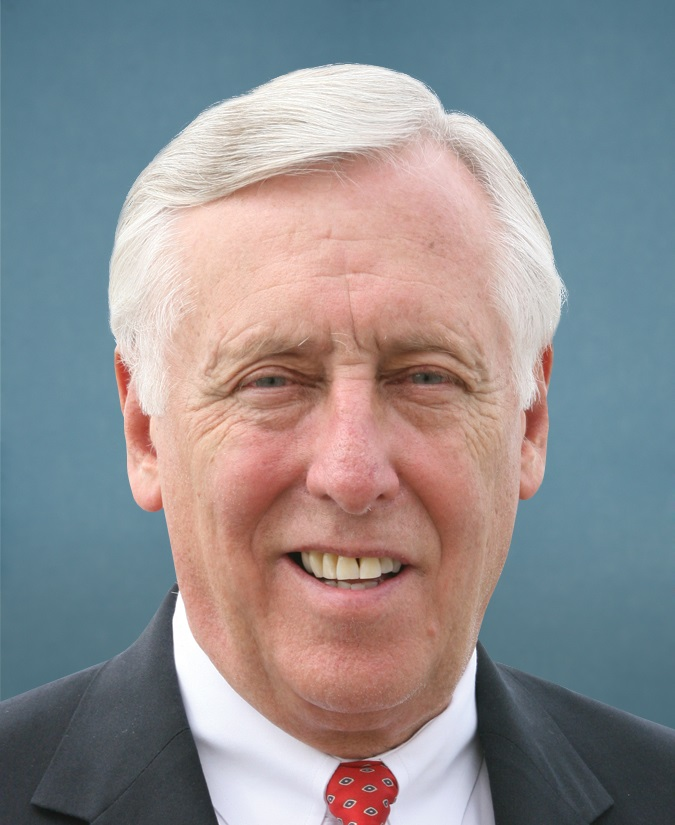
Democratic whip
Steny Hoyer

== Changes in membership ==
=== Senate ===
Senate changes
| State (class) | Vacated by | Reason for change | Successor | Date of successor's formal installation (Note: When seated or oath administered, not necessarily when service began.) |
|---|---|---|---|---|
| Nevada (1) | John Ensign (R) | Resigned May 3, 2011, due to an Ethics Committee investigation. Successor appointed April 27, 2011 and later elected for a full six-year term. | Dean Heller (R) | May 9, 2011 |
| Hawaii (3) | Daniel Inouye (D) | Died December 17, 2012; Successor appointed December 26, 2012, to serve until a special election was held to finish the term ending January 3, 2017. | Brian Schatz (D) | December 27, 2012 |
| South Carolina (3) | Jim DeMint (R) | Resigned January 1, 2013, to run The Heritage Foundation; Successor appointed January 2, 2013, to serve until a special election was held to finish the term ending January 3, 2017. | Tim Scott (R) | January 2, 2013 |

=== House of Representatives ===
House changes
| District | Vacated by | Reason for change | Successor | Date of successor's formal installation |
|---|---|---|---|---|
| New York 26th | Christopher Lee (R) | Resigned February 9, 2011, due to a personal scandal. A special election was held May 24, 2011. | Kathy Hochul (D) | June 1, 2011 |
| California 36th | Jane Harman (D) | Resigned February 28, 2011, to become the head of the Woodrow Wilson Center. A special election was held July 12, 2011. | Janice Hahn (D) | July 19, 2011 |
| Nevada 2nd | Dean Heller (R) | Resigned May 9, 2011, when appointed to the Senate. A special election was held September 13, 2011. | Mark Amodei (R) | September 15, 2011 |
| New York 9th | Anthony Weiner (D) | Resigned June 21, 2011, due to a personal scandal. A special election was held September 13, 2011. | Bob Turner (R) | September 15, 2011 |
| Oregon 1st | David Wu (D) | Resigned August 3, 2011, due to a personal scandal. A special election was held January 31, 2012. | Suzanne Bonamici (D) | February 7, 2012 |
| Arizona 8th | Gabby Giffords (D) | Resigned January 25, 2012, to focus on recovery from 2011 Tucson shooting. A special election was held June 12, 2012. | Ron Barber (D) | June 19, 2012 |
| New Jersey 10th | Donald M. Payne (D) | Died March 6, 2012. A special election was held November 6, 2012. | Donald Payne Jr. (D) | November 15, 2012 |
| Washington 1st | Jay Inslee (D) | Resigned March 20, 2012, to focus on gubernatorial campaign. A special election was held November 6, 2012. | Suzan DelBene (D) | November 13, 2012 |
| Michigan 11th | Thaddeus McCotter (R) | Resigned July 6, 2012, for personal reasons. A special election was held November 6, 2012. | David Curson (D) | November 13, 2012 |
| Kentucky 4th | Geoff Davis (R) | Resigned July 31, 2012, for personal reasons. A special election was held November 6, 2012. | Thomas Massie (R) | November 13, 2012 |
| California 18th | Dennis Cardoza (D) | Resigned August 15, 2012, for personal reasons. | Vacant until the next Congress | |
| Illinois 2nd | Jesse Jackson Jr. (D) | Resigned November 21, 2012, due to a personal scandal. | Vacant until the next Congress | |
| California 51st | Bob Filner (D) | Resigned December 3, 2012, to become mayor of San Diego. | Vacant until the next Congress | |
| South Carolina 1st | Tim Scott (R) | Resigned January 2, 2013, when appointed to the United States Senate. | Vacant until the next Congress | |

== Committees ==
[ Section contents: Senate, House, Joint ]

=== Senate ===
| Committee | Chairman | Ranking Member |
|---|---|---|
| Aging (special) | Herb Kohl (D-WI) | Bob Corker (R-TN) |
| Agriculture, Nutrition and Forestry | Debbie Stabenow (D-MI) | Pat Roberts (R-KS) |
| Appropriations | Daniel Inouye (D-HI) | Thad Cochran (R-MS) |
| Armed Services | Carl Levin (D-MI) | John McCain (R-AZ) |
| Banking, Housing and Urban Affairs | Tim Johnson (D-SD) | Richard Shelby (R-AL) |
| Budget | Kent Conrad (D-ND) | Jeff Sessions (R-AL) |
| Commerce, Science and Transportation | Jay Rockefeller (D-WV) | Kay Bailey Hutchison (R-TX) |
| Energy and Natural Resources | Jeff Bingaman (D-NM) | Lisa Murkowski (R-AK) |
| Environment and Public Works | Barbara Boxer (D-CA) | Jim Inhofe (R-OK) |
| Ethics (select) | Barbara Boxer (D-CA) | Johnny Isakson (R-GA) |
| Finance | Max Baucus (D-MT) | Orrin Hatch (R-UT) |
| Foreign Relations | John Kerry (D-MA) | Richard Lugar (R-IN) |
| Health, Education, Labor and Pensions | Tom Harkin (D-IA) | Mike Enzi (R-WY) |
| Homeland Security and Governmental Affairs | Joe Lieberman (I-CT) | Susan Collins (R-ME) |
| Indian Affairs | Daniel Akaka (D-HI) | John Barrasso (R-WY) |
| Intelligence (select) | Dianne Feinstein (D-CA) | Saxby Chambliss (R-GA) |
| Judiciary | Patrick Leahy (D-VT) | Chuck Grassley (R-IA) |
| Rules and Administration | Chuck Schumer (D-NY) | Lamar Alexander (R-TN) |
| Small Business and Entrepreneurship | Mary Landrieu (D-LA) | Olympia Snowe (R-ME) |
| Veterans' Affairs | Patty Murray (D-WA) | Richard Burr (R-NC) |

=== House of Representatives ===
| Committee | Chairman | Ranking Member |
|---|---|---|
| Agriculture | Frank Lucas (R-OK) | Collin Peterson (D-MN) |
| Appropriations | Harold Rogers (R-KY) | Nita Lowey (D-NY) |
| Armed Services | Buck McKeon (R-CA) | Adam Smith (D-WA) |
| Budget | Paul Ryan (R-WI) | Chris Van Hollen (D-MD) |
| Education and the Workforce | John Kline (R-MN) | George Miller (D-CA) |
| Energy and Commerce | Fred Upton (R-MI) | Henry Waxman (D-CA) |
| Ethics | Jo Bonner (R-AL) | Linda Sánchez (D-CA) |
| Financial Services | Spencer Bachus (R-AL) | Barney Frank (D-MA) |
| Foreign Affairs | Ileana Ros-Lehtinen (R-FL) | Howard Berman (D-CA) |
| Homeland Security | Peter King (R-NY) | Bennie Thompson (D-MS) |
| House Administration | Dan Lungren (R-CA) | Robert Brady (D-PA) |
| Judiciary | Lamar Smith (R-TX) | John Conyers (D-MI) |
| Natural Resources | Doc Hastings (R-WA) | Ed Markey (D-MA) |
| Oversight and Government Reform | Darrell Issa (R-CA) | Elijah Cummings (D-MD) |
| Rules | David Dreier (R-CA) | Louise Slaughter (D-NY) |
| Science, Space & Technology | Ralph Hall (R-TX) | Eddie Bernice Johnson (D-TX) |
| Small Business | Sam Graves (R-MO) | Nydia Velázquez (D-NY) |
| Transportation and Infrastructure | John Mica (R-FL) | Nick Rahall (D-WV) |
| Veterans' Affairs | Jeff Miller (R-FL) | Bob Filner (D-CA) |
| Ways and Means | Dave Camp (R-MI) | Sander Levin (D-MI) |
| Permanent Select Committee on Intelligence | Mike Rogers (R-MI) | Dutch Ruppersberger (D-MD) |

=== Joint appointments ===
- Deficit Reduction (Select)— Co-chairs: Rep. Jeb Hensarling (R), Sen. Patty Murray (D)
- Economic— Chair: Sen. Bob Casey Jr. (D), Ranking: Rep. Kevin Brady (R)
- Inaugural Ceremonies (Special)— Chair: Sen. Chuck Schumer (D), Ranking: Sen. Lamar Alexander (R)
- The Library— Chair: Sen. Chuck Schumer (D), Ranking: Rep. Gregg Harper (R)
- Printing— Chair: Rep. Gregg Harper (R), Ranking: Sen. Chuck Schumer (D)
- Taxation— Chair: Rep. Dave Camp (R), Ranking: Sen. Max Baucus (D)

== Employees ==
=== Legislative branch agency directors ===
- Architect of the Capitol: Stephen T. Ayers
- Attending Physician of the United States Congress: Brian Monahan
- Comptroller General of the United States: Eugene Louis Dodaro
- Director of the Congressional Budget Office: Douglas W. Elmendorf
- Librarian of Congress: James H. Billington
- Public Printer of the United States: William J. Boarman, until January 3, 2012
  - Davita Vance-Cooks, from January 3, 2012

=== Senate ===
- Chaplain: Barry C. Black (Seventh-day Adventist)
- Curator: Diane K. Skvarla
- Historian: Richard A. Baker
- Parliamentarian: Alan Frumin, until February 2, 2012
  - Elizabeth MacDonough, from February 2, 2012
- Secretary: Nancy Erickson
- Sergeant at Arms: Terrance W. Gainer
- Secretary for the Majority: Gary B. Myrick
- Secretary for the Minority: David J. Schiappa

=== House of Representatives ===
- Chaplain: Daniel Coughlin (Roman Catholic), until April 14, 2011
  - Patrick J. Conroy (Roman Catholic), from May 25, 2011
- Chief Administrative Officer: Daniel J. Strodel
- Clerk: Karen L. Haas
- Historian: Matthew Wasniewski
- Parliamentarian: John V. Sullivan, until 2012
  - Thomas Wickham Jr., from 2012
- Reading Clerks: Susan Cole (R) and Joseph Novotny (D)
- Sergeant at Arms: Wilson Livingood, until January 17, 2012
  - Paul D. Irving from January 17, 2012
- Inspector General: Theresa M. Grafenstine

== See also ==
- Do Not Ask What Good We Do

=== Elections ===
- 2010 United States elections (elections held in advance of this Congress)
  - 2010 United States Senate elections
  - 2010 United States House of Representatives elections
- 2012 United States elections (elections to be held during this Congress)
  - 2012 United States presidential election
  - 2012 United States Senate elections
  - 2012 United States House of Representatives elections

=== Membership lists ===
- List of new members of the 112th United States Congress
- Members of the 112th United States Congress
