= Domestic Fuels Protection Act =

The Domestic Fuels Protection Act (112th H.R. 4345, 113th H.R. 1214) is a proposed law pending in the U.S. Congress to protect domestic producers and sellers of ethanol, biodiesel, and other clean fuels from liability to end-users who put the wrong kind of fuel or fuel mix into their tanks and suffer damage to their engines. The idea is to ensure that domestic producers of alternative fuel and related equipment aren't put out of business due to crippling liability claims.
