= Export–Import Bank Reauthorization Act of 2012 =

USA government act, 2012

- Long title: To reauthorize the Export-Import Bank of the United States, and for other purposes.
- Enacted by: the 112th United States Congress
- Effective: May 30, 2012

Citations
- Public law: 112–122

Legislative history
- Introduced in the House as H.R.2072 by Rep. Gary Miller (R-CA-42) on 10 June 2011; Committee consideration by House Committee on Financial Services; Passed the House on 5 May 2012 (330 - 93); Passed the Senate on 15 May 2012 (78 - 20); Signed into law by President Barack Obama on May 30, 2012

The Export–Import Bank Reauthorization Act of 2012 amended the Export–Import Bank Act of 1945 to extend the termination of functions of the Export–Import Bank of the United States, which helps financing and insuring foreign purchases of United States goods for customers unable or unwilling to accept credit risk and to aid in creating and sustaining jobs in the United States by financing sales of U.S. produced exports to international buyers. The bill was signed into law on May 20, 2012 and moved the termination of the bank's functions date to September 30, 2014.

In addition to placing additional reporting requirements on the bank, it also prohibits the bank from approving any guarantee, insurance, or extension of credit in connection with a borrower or controlling sponsor, or a person that is owned or controlled by such borrower or sponsor, that is subject to petroleum-related sanctions under the Iran Sanctions Act of 1996.

The bank's functions were extended through June 30, 2015 as part of a continuing resolution Congress passed which provided FY2015 appropriations to federal agencies until December 11, 2014.

== Act Sections ==
Section one is not shown, being only the titles and table of contents of the Act.

=== Section 2 ===
"[Extends] the termination of functions date for the Export-Import Bank... to September 30, 2014".

=== Section 3 ===
Increases limit for loans, guarantees, and insurance for the 2012 Fiscal Year to $120 billion.

=== Section 4 ===
Requires that the Export-Import Bank submits a business plan to Congress and the Comptroller General. This business plan must include "estimates of anticipated growth for 2012-2014", risk potential analysis, and an analysis of Bank resources to moderate authorizations.

=== Section 5 ===
Requires that the Comptroller General must submit an evaluation of the Bank's growth rate over time, "the effectiveness of the Bank's risk management," calculations of future program costs, Bank fees, and an analysis of the Bank's policy on loan loss reserves. The Bank must report a plan of implementing those recommendations to Congress.

=== Section 6 ===
The Bank must also monitor interest rates of short-, medium-, and long-term financing, and report to Congress on a monthly basis if that rate is more than 2%. The report must include actions taken to reduce that rate.

=== Section 7 ===
The Bank must set standards for its partners and participants, seek a higher credit status than all other creditors, and give due notice for transactions exceeding $100 million.

=== Section 10 ===
The Bank must, annually, categorize each loan and guarantee for the following purposes: "(1) to assume commercial or political risk that exporter or private financial institutions are unwilling or unable to undertake; (2) to overcome maturity or other limitations in private sector export financing; (3) to meet foreign, officially sponsored, export credit competition; or (4) not identified and the reason why the purpose is not identified".

=== Section 11 ===
The Secretary of the Treasury must "pursue negotiations with" major exporters to reduce and eliminate export subsidies and financing, and all countries that finance aircraft with state funds, to reduce and eliminate export financing for aircraft. The Secretary must report progress of these negotiations to Congress annually.

=== Section 12 ===
The Bank must release guidelines for "conducting certain economic impact analyses or similar studies under the Export-Import Bank Act of 1945" to the public.

=== Section 13 ===
The Bank must report to Congress its verdict on the recommendations in the September 2007 GAO report and its efforts to support small businesses in the United States.

=== Section 15 ===
The Bank must review its efforts to create and maintain American jobs and contribute to the national economy through exportation of goods and services.

=== Section 16 ===
The Comptroller General must submit to Congress a report of the efforts defined in Section 15 and make any recommendations that he/she deems appropriate.

=== Section 17 ===
The Comptroller General must audit quarterly the loans and guarantees of the Bank, so that the compliance of the Bank in its guidelines and policies can be determined. Also, the Comptroller General must review the effectiveness of the Bank's protection against fraudulent loans and guarantees.

=== Section 18 ===
The Bank is not allowed to approve any guarantee, insurance, or extension of credit to anyone related to peoples under sanction as defined in the Iran Sanctions Act, Section 5(a).

=== Section 19 ===
The Bank may use some of its surplus from each Fiscal Year to upgrade its technology. This spending is limited to $20 million.

=== Section 20 ===
The textile industry now has representation in the Export-Import Bank Advisory Committee. The Committee should consider how it can promote the textile industry and support US exports of textiles, and promote jobs in the textile industry.

=== Section 21 ===
The Bank must "report to Congress regarding the extent to which its products are available and used by U.S. manufacturers that export U.S.-manufactured goods used as components in global textile and apparel supply chains".

=== Section 23 ===
The Sub-Saharan Africa Advisory Committee's termination date is extended to September 30, 2014.

=== Section 24 ===
"Bank authority to provide financing for the export of nonlethal articles or services meant primarily for civilian purposes" is extended through the 2014 Fiscal Year.

=== Section 25 ===
The Act will take effect either on June 1, 2012 or the date the Act is enacted, whichever comes first. The Act went into effect on May 30, 2012.
