= Continuing Appropriations Resolution, 2013 =

The Continuing Appropriations Resolution, 2013 (Pub. L. 112–175 (text) (PDF), H.J.Res. 117, 123 Stat. 456, enacted September 28, 2012) is a US federal enactment, namely a temporary spending bill to fund the government for six months until March 27, 2013, in order to prevent an October 1, 2012 government shutdown.

== Legislative history ==
The bill passed the United States House of Representatives by a vote of 329-91 on September 13, 2012, and the United States Senate by 62-30 on September 22, 2012. It was signed into law by President Barack Obama on September 28, 2012.
