= Federal Restricted Buildings and Grounds Improvement Act of 2011 =

Within the laws of the United States, The Federal Restricted Buildings and Grounds Improvement Act of 2011, also known as H.R. 347, Pub. L. 112–98 (text) (PDF), is a federal law in the United States allowing the Secret Service extra jurisdiction to make arrests and suppress protests in cases of trespass on restricted locations and intentional disruption of government functions.

H.R. 347 is a revision to section 1752 of Title 18 of the U.S. Code. Introduced by representative Thomas Rooney (FL-16), it makes punishable by up to 10 years' jail time or fine any person who does "or conspires to" enter any "restricted building or grounds" or within certain "proximity" without lawful authority to do so, attempting to disrupt the orderly conduct of government business.

It defines restricted building or grounds as "any posted, cordoned off, or otherwise restricted area" of

- the White House or its grounds, or the Vice President's official residence or its grounds
- a building or grounds where the President or other person protected by the Secret Service is or will be temporarily visiting
- a building or grounds that is so restricted in conjunction with an event designated as a special event of national significance.

The law passed Congress and was signed by President Barack Obama on March 8, 2012.

== Criticism ==
Media outlets have said that this act may restrict freedom of assembly and dissent.
