= National Plan of Integrated Airport Systems =

Inventory of United States airports

The National Plan of Integrated Airport Systems (NPIAS) is an inventory of U.S. aviation infrastructure assets. With the Airport and Airway Improvement Act of September 3, 1982, the Federal Aviation Administration (FAA) was required to develop a plan for improving and maintaining airport infrastructure in the United States. It has been maintained by the FAA ever since.. The current plan covers the years 2025-2029.

It identifies existing and proposed airports that are significant to national air transportation in the U.S., and thus eligible to receive federal grants under the Airport Improvement Program (AIP). It also includes estimates of the amount of AIP money needed to fund infrastructure development projects that will bring these airports up to current design standards and add capacity to congested airports. The FAA is required to provide Congress with a five-year estimate of AIP-eligible development every two years.

The NPIAS contains all commercial service and reliever airports, as well as certain general aviation airports.

== See also ==
- FAA airport categories
