= Federal Airport Act of 1946 =

United States statute for development of public airports

- Long title: An Act to provide Federal aid for the development of public airports.
- Nicknames: Federal Aid Airport Act of 1946
- Enacted by: the 79th United States Congress
- Effective: May 13, 1946

Citations
- Public law: Pub. L. 79–377
- Statutes at Large: 60 Stat. 170, Chap. 251

Codification
- Titles amended: 49 U.S.C.: Transportation
- U.S.C. sections created: 49 U.S.C. ch. 471, subch. I §§ 1101-1120

Legislative history
- Introduced in the Senate as S. 2 by Pat McCarran (D–NV) on April 30, 1945; Committee consideration by Senate Commerce, House Interstate and Foreign Commerce; Passed the Senate on September 12, 1945 (Passed); Passed the House on October 18, 1945 (279-82, in lieu of H.R. 3615); Reported by the joint conference committee on November 1, 1945; agreed to by the House on April 2, 1946 (Agreed) and by the Senate on April 30, 1946 (49-32); Signed into law by President Harry S. Truman on May 13, 1946

Federal Airport Act of 1946 is United States statute establishing a federal program for the development of civil aviation airports within the continental United States. The Act of Congress authorized federal grants to progressively evolve civil aviation bases. The public law mandates a national airport plan encompassing airport classifications as defined by the Civil Aeronautics Administration.

The Senate legislation was passed by the 79th United States Congressional session and enacted into law by the 33rd president of the United States Harry Truman on May 13, 1946.

== Provisions of the Act ==
The government financed air transportation law was drafted as nineteen sections commissioning a national construction and development plan for domestic airports throughout the United States.

49 U.S.C. § 1101 ~	Short Title
49 U.S.C. § 1101 ~	Provisions of General Application; Definitions; Airport Classifications
49 U.S.C. § 1102 ~	National Airport Plan; Formulation of Plan; Consultation with War and Navy Departments
49 U.S.C. § 1103 ~	Federal-Aid Airport Program
49 U.S.C. § 1104 ~	Appropriations; Appropriation for Preliminary Expenses; Annual Appropriations for Projects in States; Annual Appropriations for Projects in Alaska, Hawaii, and Puerto Rico; Administrative Expenses
49 U.S.C. § 1105 ~	Distribution of Funds Available for Projects in States; Apportionment of Funds; Discretionary Fund
49 U.S.C. § 1106 ~	Availability of Funds for Projects in Alaska, Hawaii, and Puerto Rico
49 U.S.C. § 1107 ~	Condition Precedent to Development of Larger Airports; Projects Authority Request for Class 4 or Larger Airports
49 U.S.C. § 1107a ~	Determination of Projects for Larger Airports; Fund Grants
49 U.S.C. § 1108 ~	Submission and Approval of Projects; Submission; Applications by Public Agencies Whose Powers are Limited by State Law; Applications by Federal Agencies; Approval; Hearings
49 U.S.C. § 1109 ~	United States Share of Project Costs; General Provision; Projects in Public Land States; Projects in Alaska; Acquisitions of Land and Interests in Air Space
49 U.S.C. § 1110 ~	Project Sponsorship
49 U.S.C. § 1111 ~	Grant Agreements
49 U.S.C. § 1112 ~	Allowable Project Costs
49 U.S.C. § 1113 ~	Payments
49 U.S.C. § 1114 ~	Performance of Construction Work; Regulations of the Administrator; Minimum Rates of Wages; Other Provisions as to Labor
49 U.S.C. § 1115 ~	Use of Government-Owned Lands; Requests for Use; Making of Conveyances
49 U.S.C. § 1116 ~	Reimbursement for Damage by Federal Agencies to Public Airports; Submission and Determination of Claims; Certification of Claims to Congress; Limitation on Submission of Claims
49 U.S.C. § 1117 ~	Reports to Congress
49 U.S.C. § 1118 ~	False Statements
49 U.S.C. § 1119 ~	Existing Airport Programs

== Amendments to 1946 Act ==
U.S. Statutes Related to Federal Airport Act

Date of Enactment	Public Law No.	U.S. Statute	U.S. Bill No.	U.S. Presidential Administration
April 17, 1948	P.L. 80-486	62 Stat. 173	S. 2081	Harry S. Truman
June 29, 1948	P.L. 80-840	62 Stat. 1111	H.R. 6860	Harry S. Truman
July 25, 1949	P.L. 81-183	63 Stat. 478	S. 1280	Harry S. Truman
July 26, 1949	P.L. 81-187	63 Stat. 480	S. 1279	Harry S. Truman
August 12, 1949	P.L. 81-224	63 Stat. 603	S. 1285	Harry S. Truman
August 15, 1949	P.L. 81-227	63 Stat. 605	S. 1278	Harry S. Truman
October 25, 1949	P.L. 81-382	63 Stat. 903	S. 1284	Harry S. Truman
October 26, 1949	P.L. 81-404	63 Stat. 925	S. 2360	Harry S. Truman
February 9, 1950	P.L. 81-445	64 Stat. 4	S. 1282	Harry S. Truman
September 27, 1950	P.L. 81-846	64 Stat. 1071	S. 2875	Harry S. Truman
January 9, 1951	P.L. 81-912	64 Stat. 1237	S. 1281	Harry S. Truman
July 8, 1953	P.L. 83-105	67 Stat. 140	S. 35	Dwight D. Eisenhower
August 3, 1955	P.L. 84-211	69 Stat. 441	S. 1855	Dwight D. Eisenhower
June 29, 1959	P.L. 86-72	73 Stat. 155	S. 1	Dwight D. Eisenhower
September 21, 1959	P.L. 86-295	73 Stat. 572	S. 2208	Dwight D. Eisenhower
September 20, 1961	P.L. 87-255	75 Stat. 523	H.R. 8102	John F. Kennedy
March 11, 1964	P.L. 88-280	78 Stat. 158	S. 1153	Lyndon B. Johnson
July 2, 1964	P.L. 88-349	78 Stat. 238	H.R. 6041	Lyndon B. Johnson
October 13, 1966	P.L. 89-647	80 Stat. 894	S. 3096	Lyndon B. Johnson

== See also ==
- Aeronautical chart
- Airport and Airway Development Act of 1970
- Airport Improvement Program
- Federal Aviation Act of 1958
- List of Class B airports in the United States
- List of Class C airports in the United States
- Post-war aviation
- Runway
