= Airport Improvement Program =

American federal grant program

The Airport Improvement Program is a United States federal grant program that provides funds to public-use airports to help improve safety and efficiency. Improvement projects relate to runways, taxiways, ramps, lighting, signage, weather stations, NAVAIDs, land acquisition, and some areas of planning. The program is managed by the Federal Aviation Administration.

Funding for the program is provided by the Airport and Airway Trust Fund, which receives revenue from taxes on airplane tickets sold to the public and a tax on aviation fuel. The federal grant may cover between 75 and 95 percent of the eligible costs, depending on the type of improvement and the size of the airport. Both commercial and general aviation airports are eligible for AIP grants.

Grants awarded for Fiscal Year 2017 totaled $3,332,800,000.

== History ==
The program was established under the Airport and Airway Improvement Act of 1982 (Pub. L. 97–248) by combining the Planning Grant Program (PGP) and Airport Development Air Program (ADAP) into a single normally multi-year grant. In 1994, the provisions of the Airport and Airway Improvement Act of 1982 were codified in subchapter I of chapter 471 of title 49, United States Code.

Previous related programs include:

- Federal Airport Act of 1946
  - Federal-Aid Airport Program (FAAP)
- Airport and Airway Development Act of 1970
  - Planning Grant Program (PGP)
  - Airport Development Aid Program (ADAP)

== Amendments to 1982 Act ==
U.S. Congressional amendments to the Airport and Airway Improvement Act.

Date of Enactment	Public Law Number	U.S. Statute Citation	U.S. Legislative Bill	U.S. Presidential Administration
December 30, 1987	P.L. 100-223	101 Stat. 1486	H.R. 2310	Ronald W. Reagan
October 31, 1992	P.L. 102-581	106 Stat. 4872	H.R. 6168	George H.W. Bush
August 23, 1994	P.L. 103-305	108 Stat. 1569	H.R. 2739	William J. Clinton

== 2017 budget ==
In Fiscal Year 2017 the FAA awarded $802.5 million in grants to 109 large airports and $2.472 billion to 1,613 small airports. An additional $57.6 million was awarded for airport system planning grants to state transportation agencies. In 2021, more than $627 million was provided in funding to 390 airports.
