= Airport =

Facility with a runway for aircraft

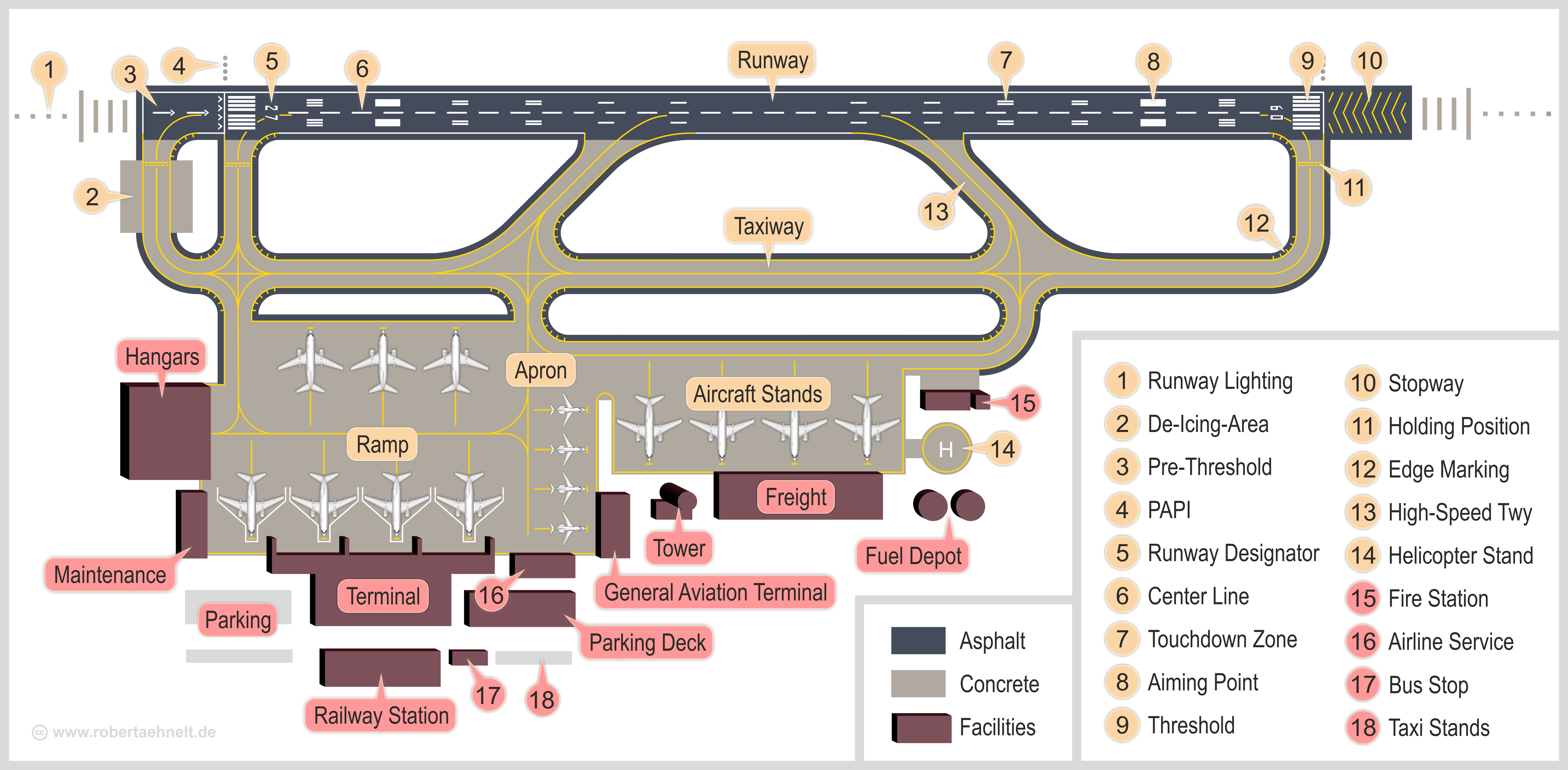
Sample infrastructure of a typical airport. Larger airports usually contain more runways and terminals.

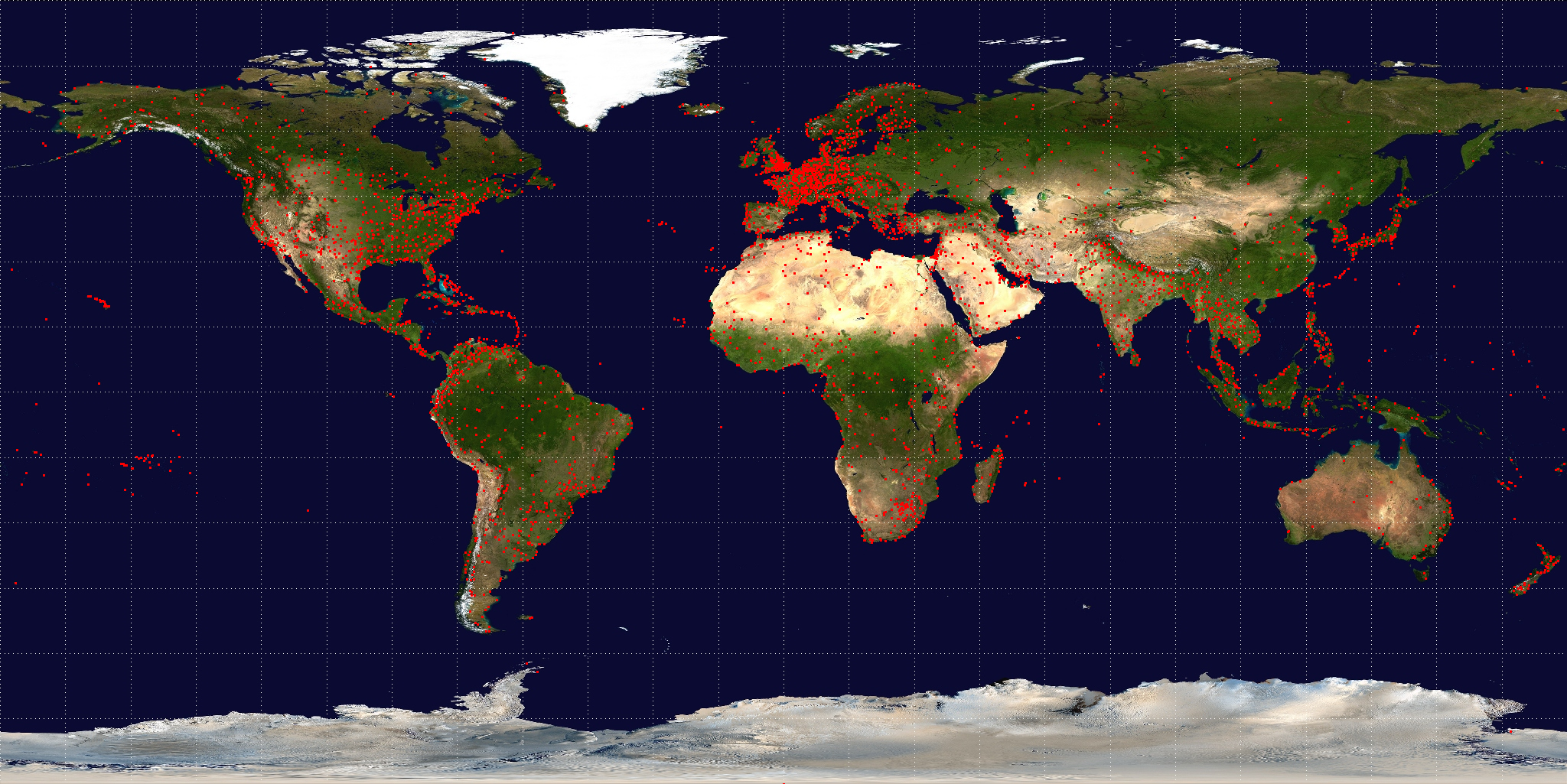
Airport distribution as of 2008 (many small airfields not shown)

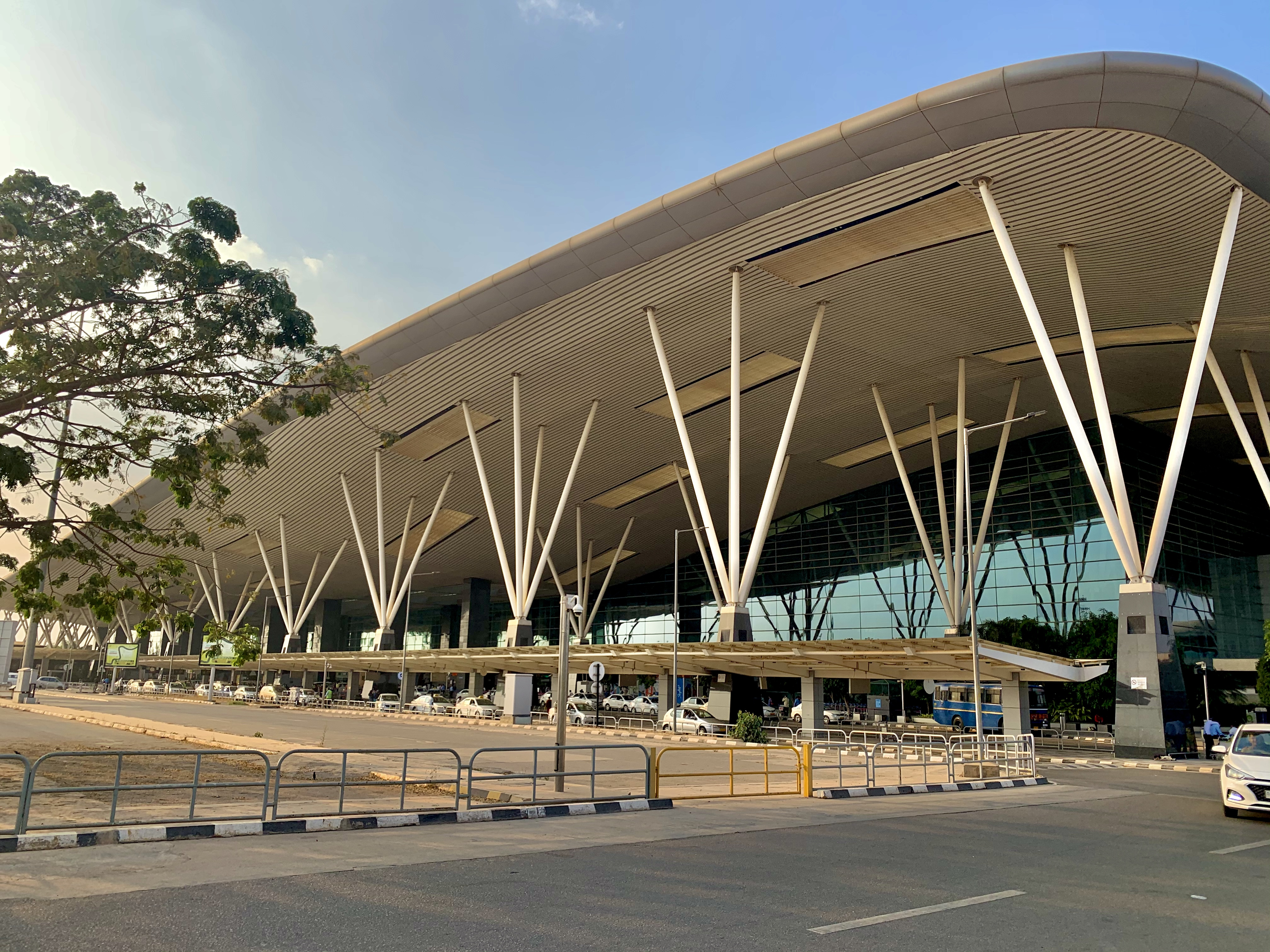
Kempegowda International Airport in Bengaluru, India

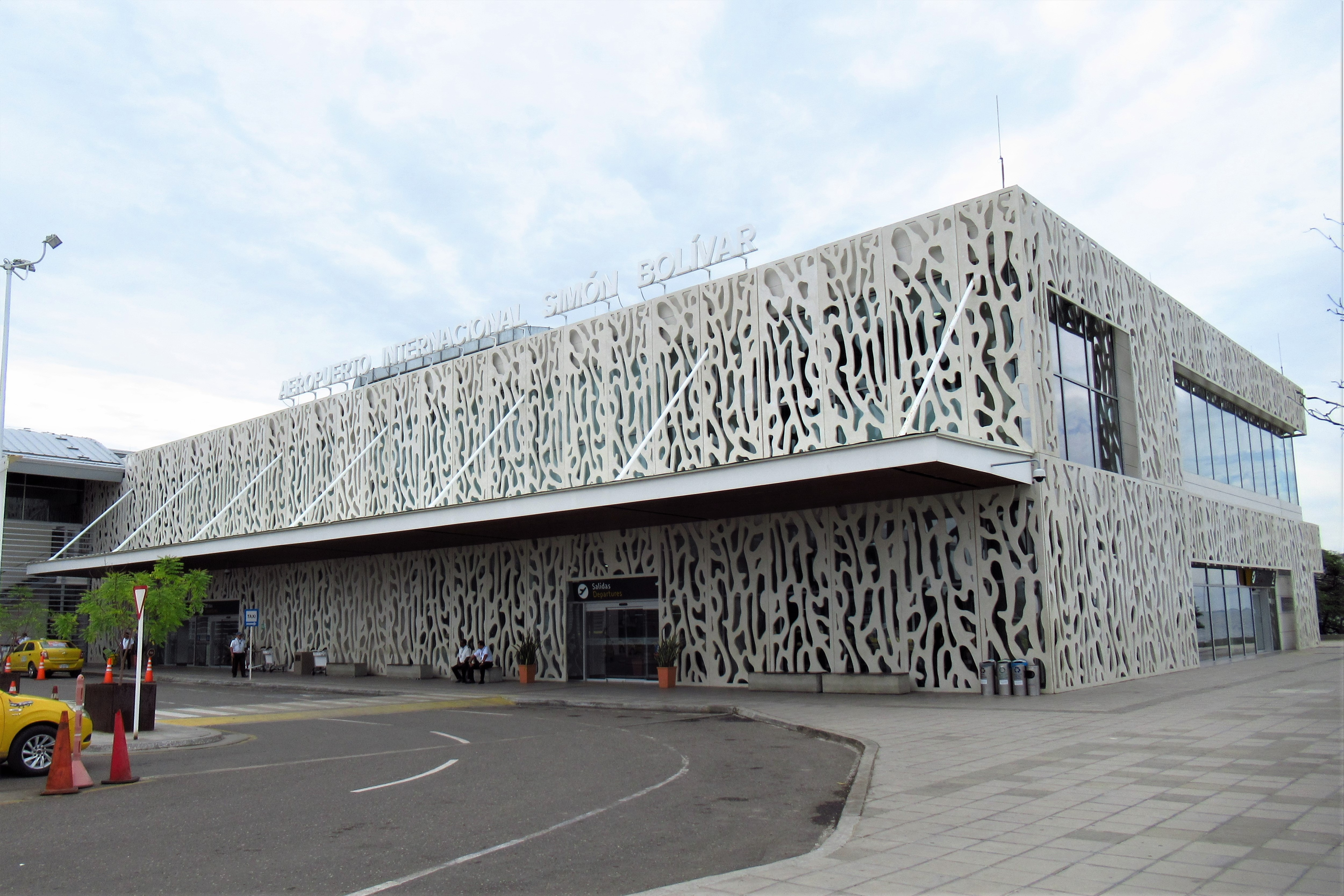
Simón Bolívar International Airport in Santa Marta, Colombia

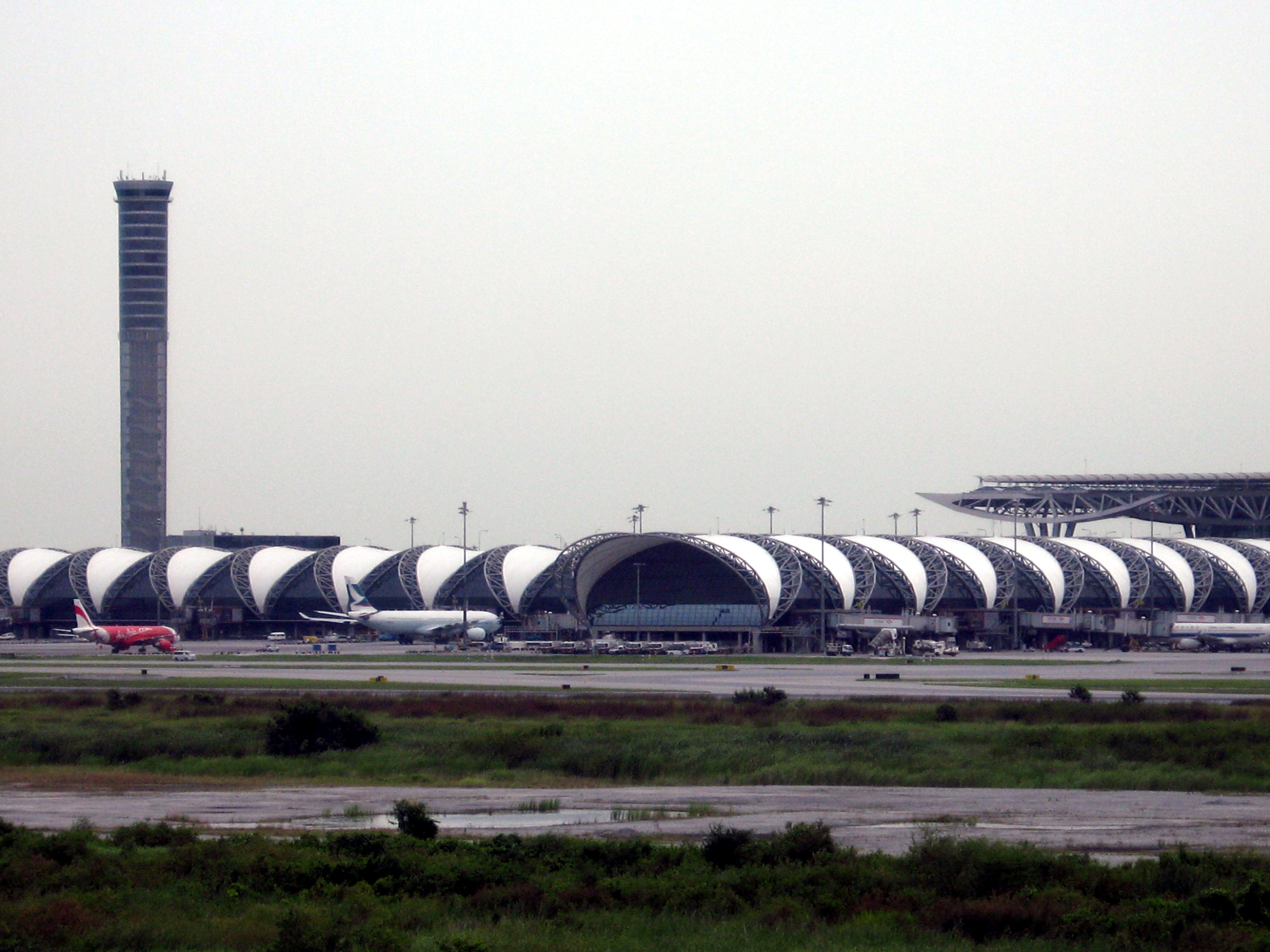
Suvarnabhumi Airport in Bangkok, Thailand

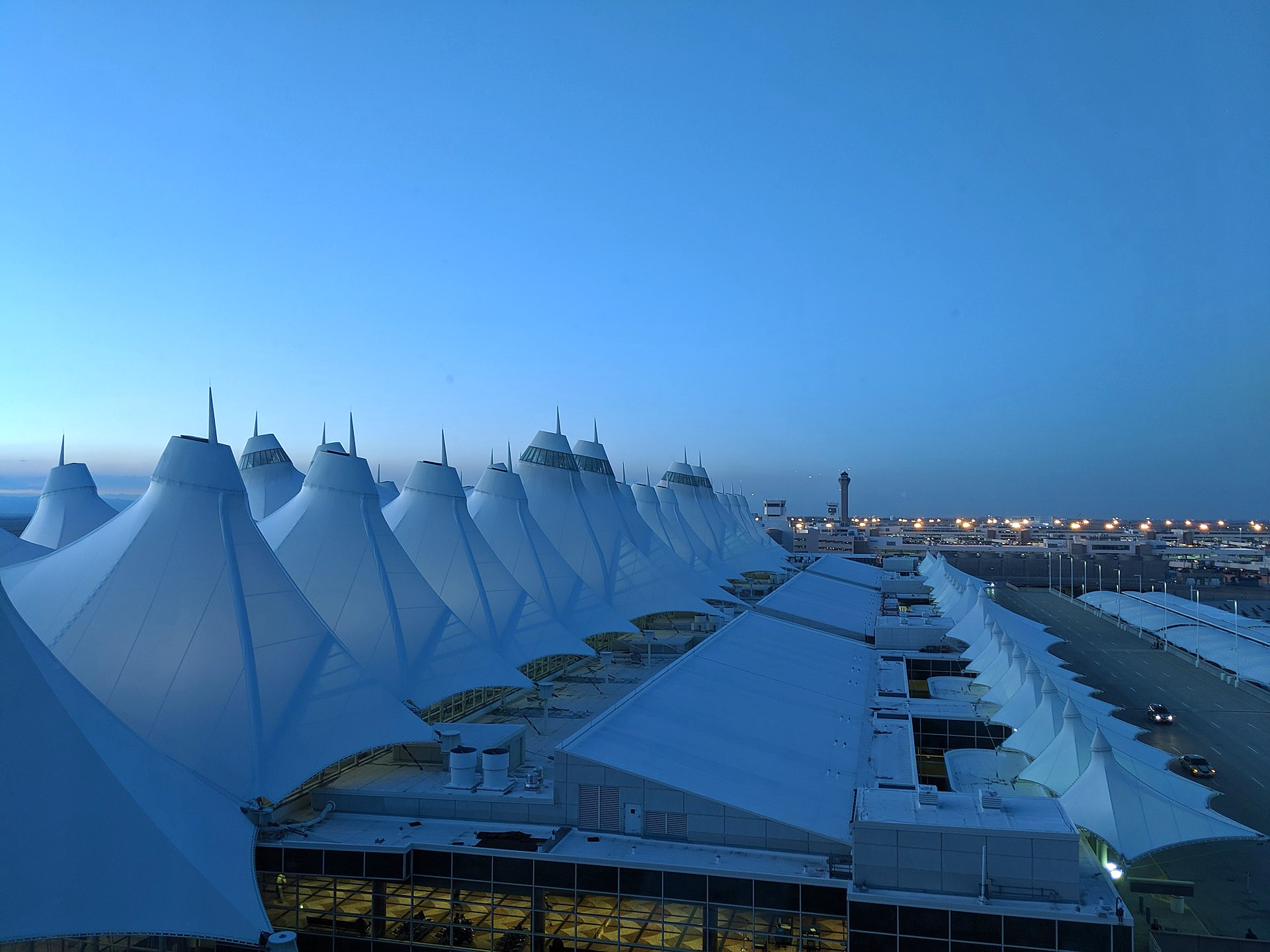
Denver International Airport in Denver, Colorado, United States

An airport is an aerodrome with extended facilities, mostly for commercial air transport. They usually consist of a landing area, which comprises an aerially accessible open space including at least one operationally active surface such as a runway for a plane to take off and to land or a helipad, and often includes adjacent utility buildings such as control towers, hangars and terminals, to maintain and monitor aircraft. Larger airports may have airport aprons, taxiway bridges, air traffic control centres, passenger facilities such as restaurants and lounges, and emergency services. In some countries, the US in particular, airports also typically have one or more fixed-base operators, serving general aviation.

Airport operations are extremely complex, with a complicated system of aircraft support services, passenger services, and aircraft control services contained within the operation. Thus airports can be major employers, as well as important hubs for tourism and other kinds of transit. Because they are sites of operation for heavy machinery, a number of regulations and safety measures have been implemented in airports, in order to reduce hazards. Additionally, airports have major local environmental impacts, as both large sources of air pollution, noise pollution and other environmental impacts, making them sites that acutely experience the environmental effects of aviation. Airports are also vulnerable infrastructure to extreme weather, climate change caused sea level rise and other disasters.

== Terminology ==
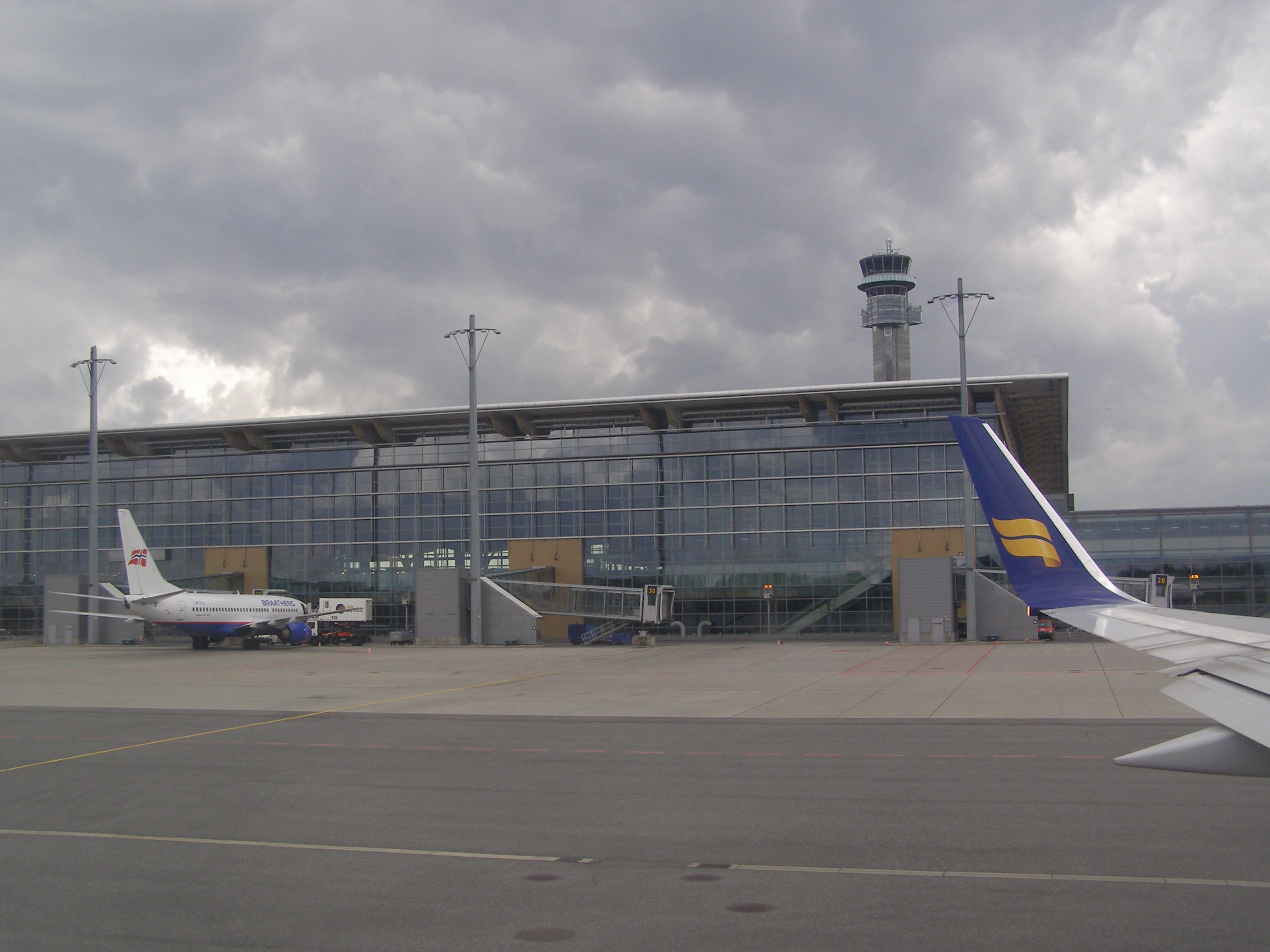
Air bridges at Oslo Gardermoen Airport captured from an Icelandair Boeing 757-200

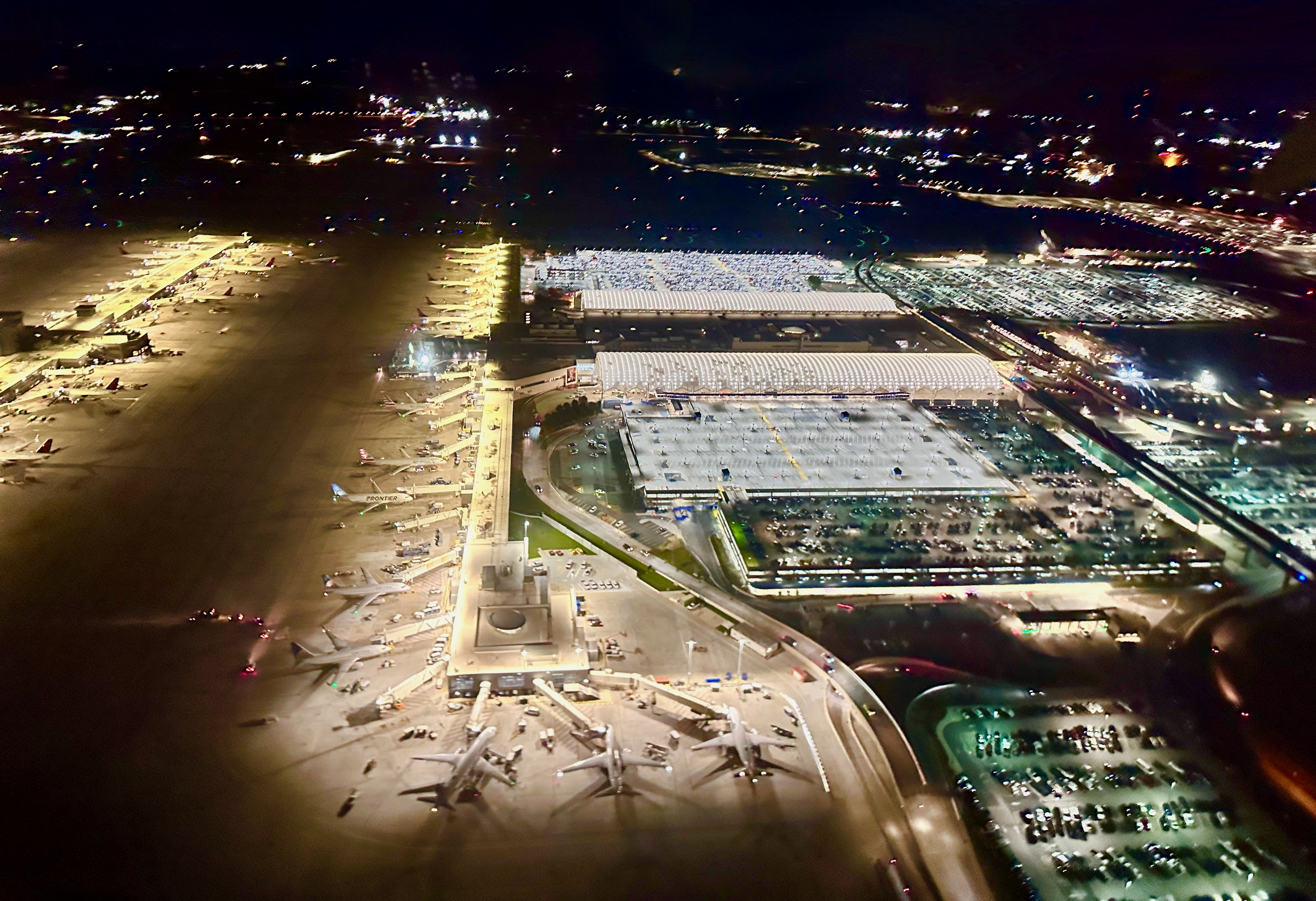
Hartsfield-Jackson Atlanta International Airport is the busiest in the world.

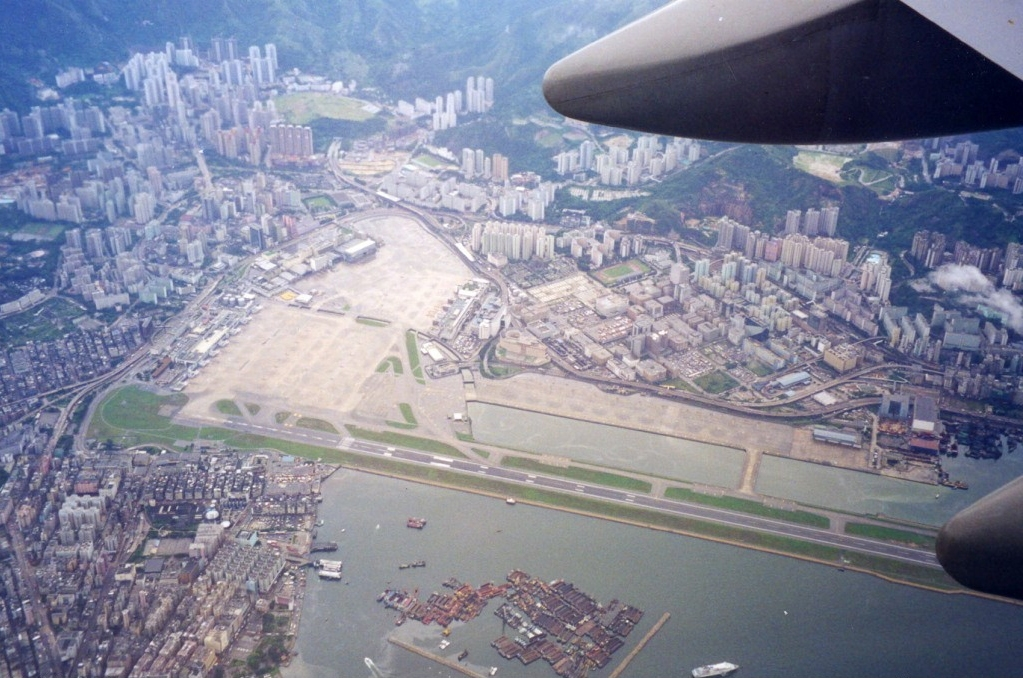
Aerial view of Hong Kong's old Kai Tak Airport, taken the day after the airport closed

The word aeroplane emerged in the 1870s, long before the Wright brothers succeeded in 1903. In an interview with The New York Times in 1902, Alberto Santos-Dumont coined the term airport: "What do I think about the future of aerial navigation?" he said in answer to a volley of questions. "Well, I have no doubt at all that in my time, perhaps in ten years, if the proper encouragement and help are forthcoming, air navigation will be an accomplished fact. No doubt we shall then cross the Atlantic from New York to Paris." Here the inventor coined a word, saying that he expected this city to be the principal "airport" of the world in less than a score of years.

The terms aerodrome, airfield, and airstrip also refer to airports, and the terms heliport, seaplane base, and STOLport refer to airports dedicated exclusively to helicopters, seaplanes, and short take-off and landing aircraft, respectively. In colloquial use in certain environments, the terms airport and aerodrome are often interchanged. However, in general, the term airport may imply or confer a certain stature upon the aviation facility that other aerodromes may not have achieved. In some jurisdictions, airport is a legal term of art reserved exclusively for those aerodromes certified or licensed as airports by the relevant civil aviation authority after meeting specified certification criteria or regulatory requirements.

That is to say, all airports are aerodromes, but not all aerodromes are airports. In jurisdictions where there is no legal distinction between aerodrome and airport, which term to use in the name of an aerodrome may be a commercial decision. In US technical/legal usage, landing area is used instead of aerodrome, and airport means "a landing area used regularly by aircraft for receiving or discharging passengers or cargo".

== Management ==
Smaller or less-developed airfields, which represent the vast majority, often have a single runway shorter than 1,000 m (3,300 ft). Larger airports for airline flights generally have paved runways of 2,000 m (6,600 ft) or longer. Skyline Airport in Inkom, Idaho, has a runway that is only 122 m (400 ft) long.

As of 2009, the CIA stated that there were approximately 44,000 "airports or airfields recognizable from the air" around the world, including 15,095 in the US, the US having the most in the world.

=== Airport ownership and operation ===
Many US airports still lease part or all of their facilities to outside firms, who operate functions such as retail management and parking. All US commercial airport runways are certified by the FAA under the Code of Federal Regulations Title 14 Part 139, "Certification of Commercial Service Airports".

=== Airport funding ===
The Airport & Airway Trust Fund (AATF) was created by the Airport and Airway Development in 1970 which finances aviation programs in the United States. Airport Improvement Program (AIP), Facilities and Equipment (F&E), and Research, Engineering, and Development (RE&D) are the three major accounts of Federal Aviation Administration which are financed by the AATF, as well as pays for the FAA's Operation and Maintenance (O&M) account. The funding of these accounts are dependent on the taxes the airports generate of revenues. Passenger tickets, fuel, and cargo tax are the taxes that are paid by the passengers and airlines help fund these accounts.

=== Airport revenue ===
Airports revenues are divided into three major parts: aeronautical revenue, non-aeronautical revenue, and non-operating revenue. Aeronautical revenue makes up 50% in 2021 (from 54% and 48% in 2019 and 2020, non-aeronautical revenue makes up 34% (40%, 39% in previous years), and non-operating revenue makes up 16% (6%, 14%) of the total revenue of airports.

==== Aeronautical revenue ====
Aeronautical revenue are generated through airline rents and landing, passenger service, parking, and hangar fees. Landing fees are charged per aircraft for landing an airplane in the airport property. Landing fees are calculated through the landing weight and the size of the aircraft which varies but most of the airports have a fixed rate and charge extra for extra weight. Aircraft parking is also a major revenue source for airports. Aircraft are parked for a certain amount of time before or after takeoff and have to pay to park there. Every airport has its own rates of parking, for example, John F. Kennedy International Airport in New York City charges $45 per hour for a plane of 100,000 pounds and the price increases with weight.

==== Non-aeronautical revenue ====
Non-aeronautical revenue is gained through things other than aircraft operations. It includes lease revenue from compatible land-use development, non-aeronautical building leases, retail and concession sales, rental car operations, parking and in-airport advertising. Concession revenue is one big part of non-aeronautical revenue airports make through duty free, bookstores, restaurants and money exchange. Car parking is a growing source of revenue for airports, as more people use the parking facilities of the airport. O'Hare International Airport in Chicago charges $2 per hour for every car.

==== Price regulation ====
Many airports are local monopolies. To prevent them from abusing their market power, governments regulate how much airports may charge to airlines, using price-cap regulation.

=== Landside and airside areas ===
Airports are divided into landside and airside zones. The landside is subject to fewer special laws and is part of the public realm, while access to the airside zone is tightly controlled; only passengers with a valid boarding pass, aircrew members with an identification document, and airport staff with a valid airside pass can access the airside. Landside facilities may include publicly accessible airport check-in desks, shops and ground transportation facilities.

== Facilities ==
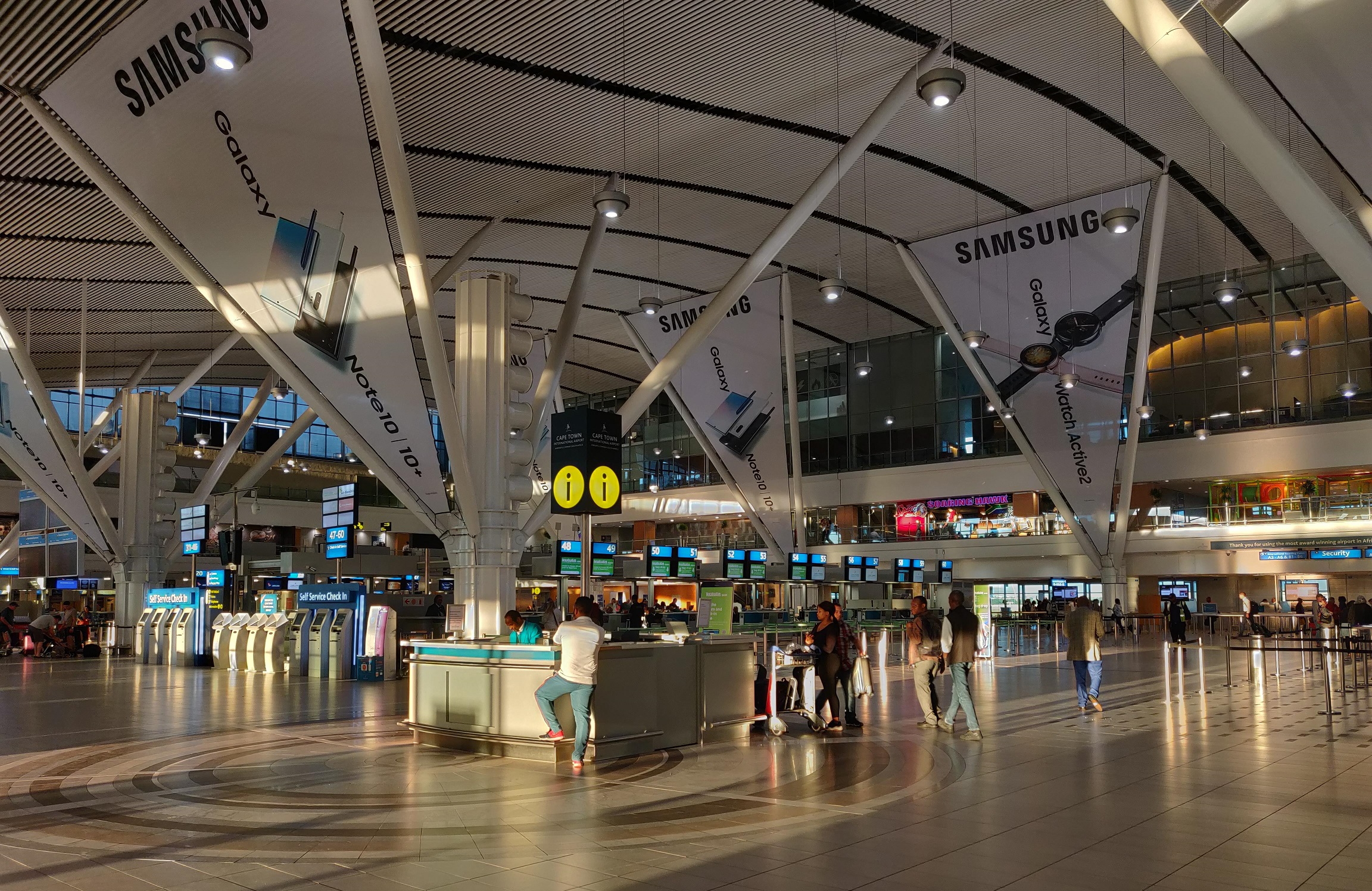
Cape Town International Airport's check-in hall

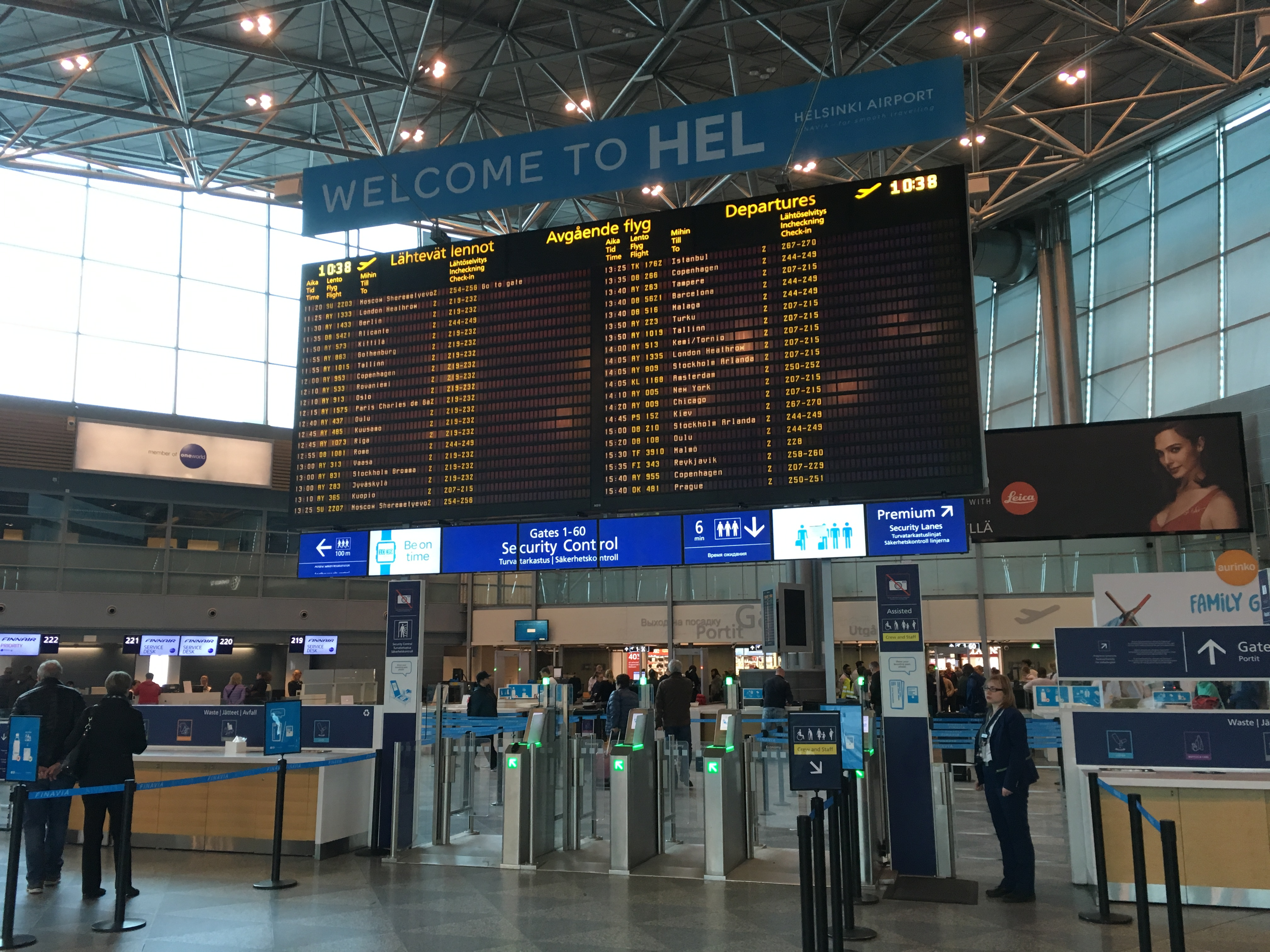
Helsinki–Vantaa Airport's security clearance gates

The area where the aircraft parks to load passengers and baggage is known as an apron or ramp (or incorrectly, "the tarmac").

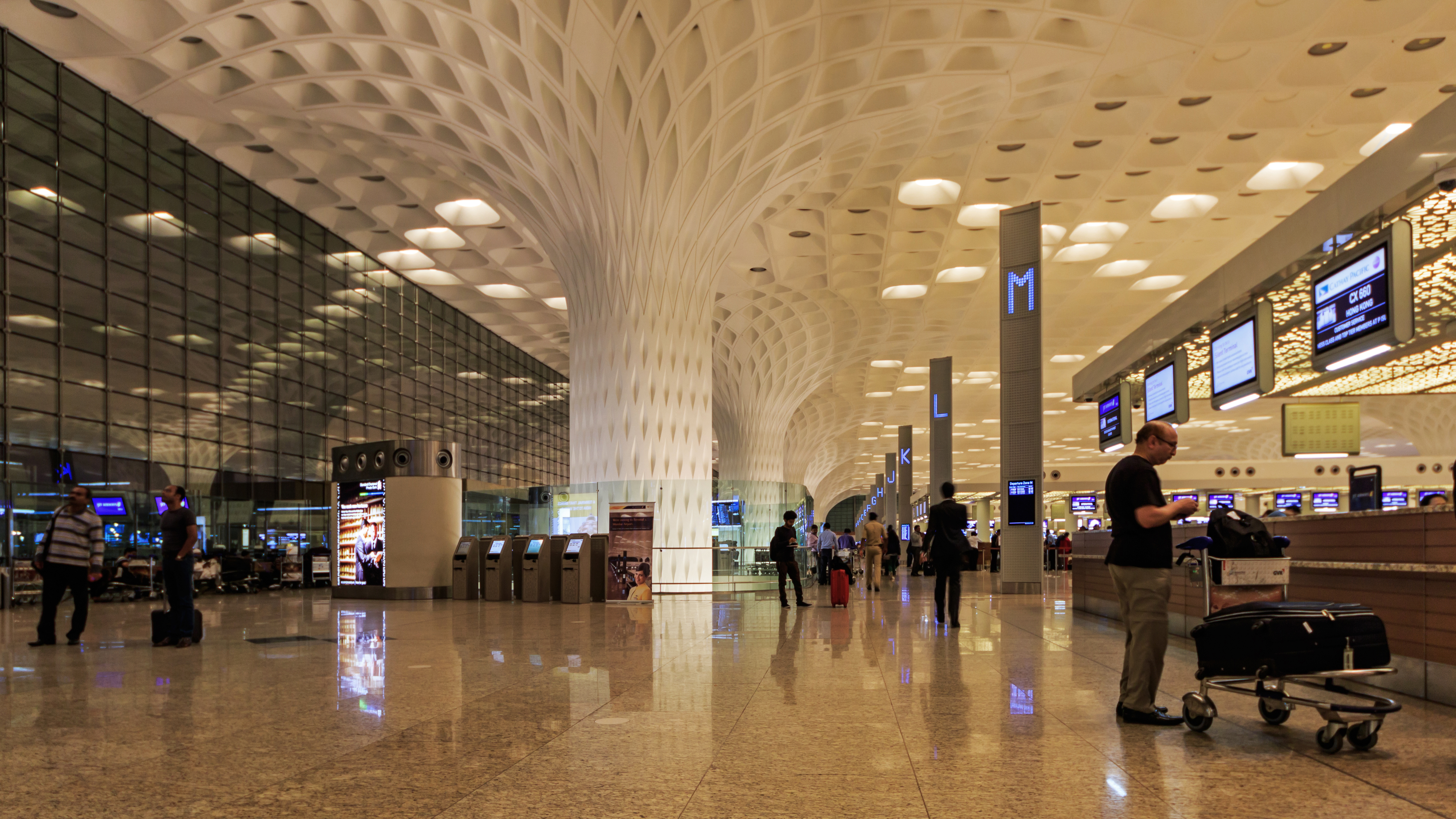
Terminal 2 at Mumbai's Chhatrapati Shivaji Maharaj International Airport

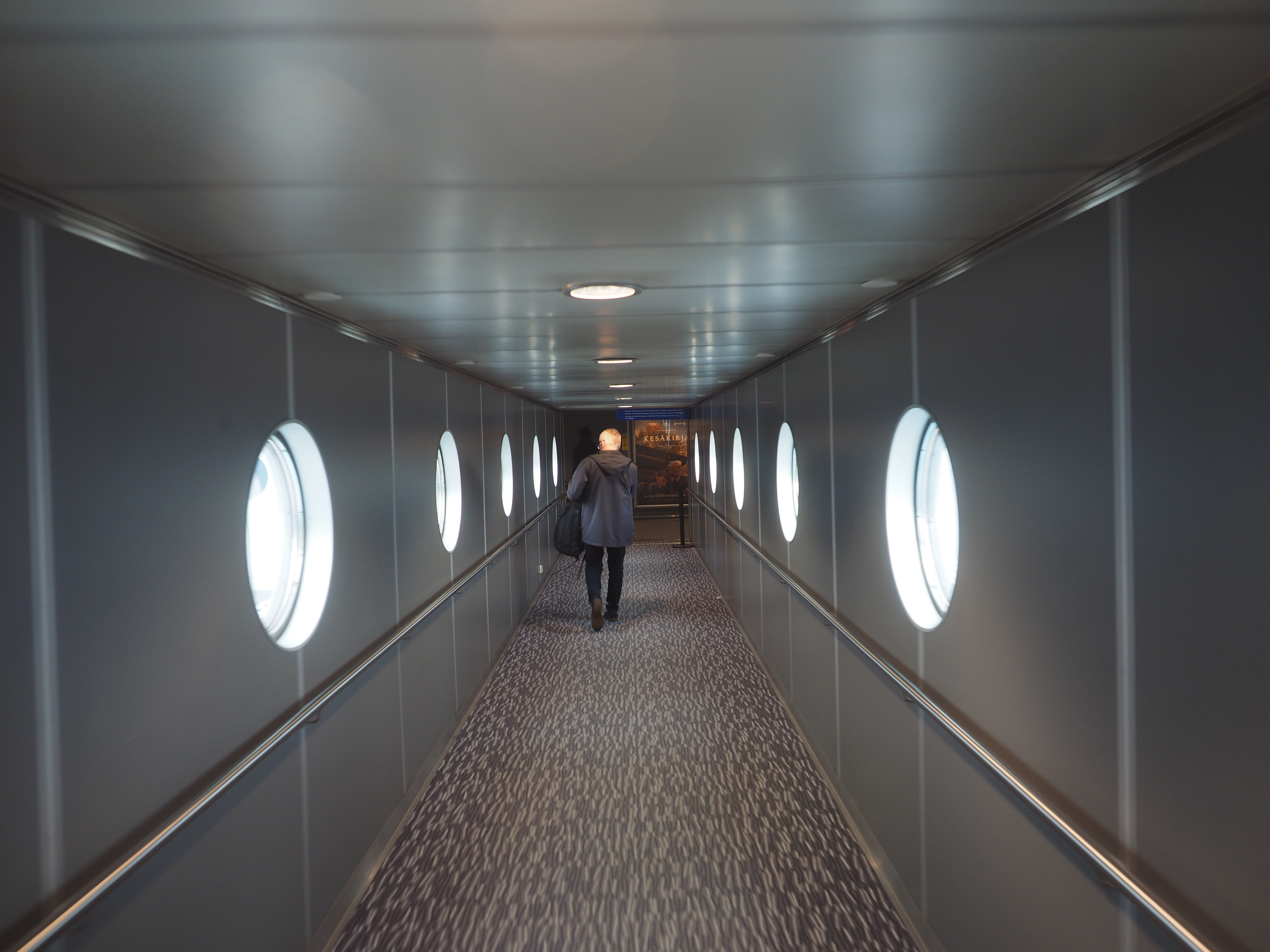
Passengers typically board the aircraft via a movable tunnel leading from the airport directly to the aircraft's entry door.

=== Airport security ===
Airport security normally requires baggage checks, metal screenings of individual persons, and rules against any object that could be used as a weapon. It uses technology such as x-rays and metal detectors. Since the September 11 attacks and the Real ID Act of 2005, airport security has dramatically increased and become tighter and stricter than ever before.

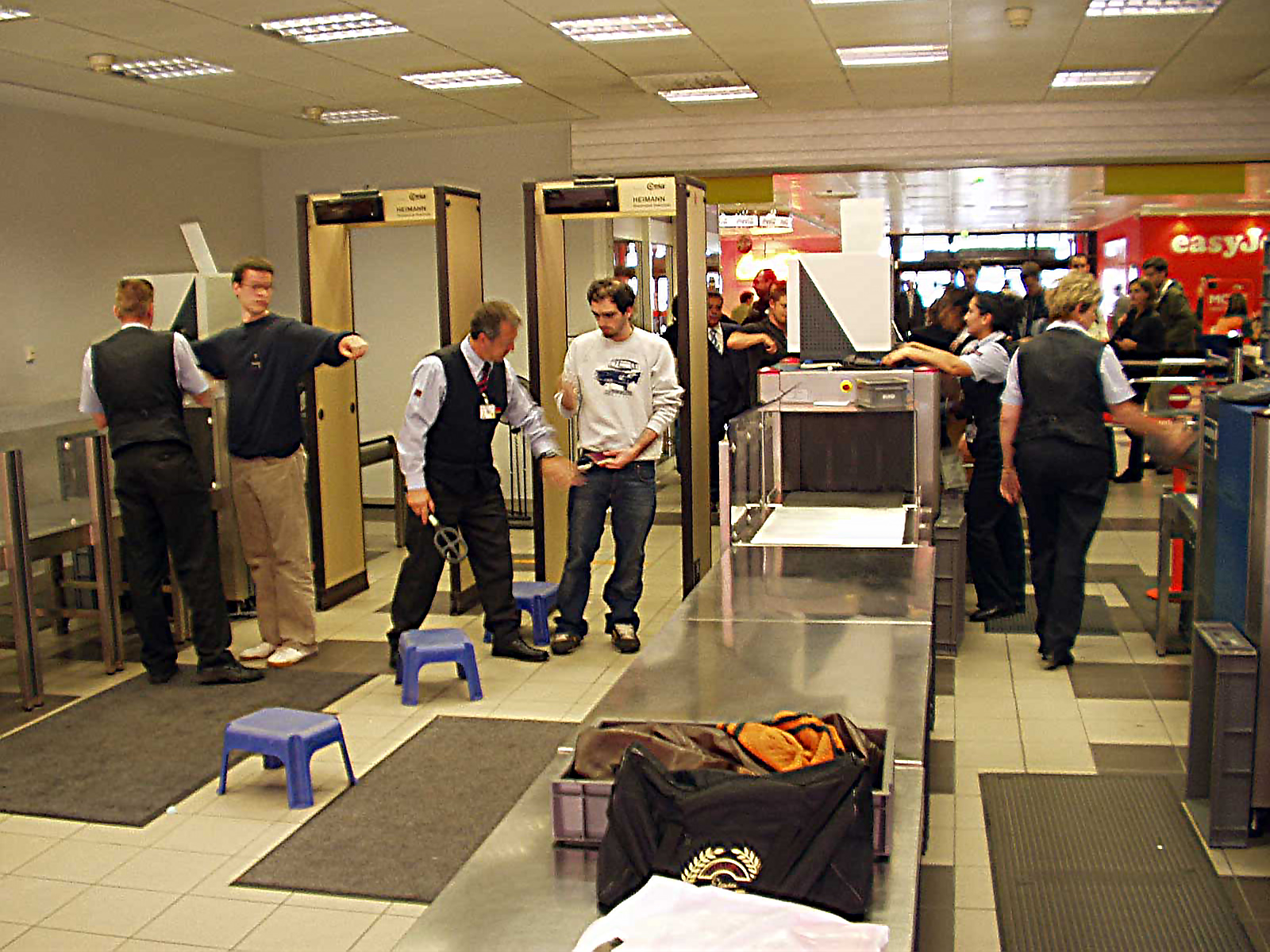
Baggage is scanned using X-ray machines as passengers walk through metal detectors. Airport security normally requires baggage checks, metal screenings of individual persons, and rules against any object that could be used as a weapon. Since the September 11 attacks and the Real ID Act of 2005, airport security has dramatically increased.

=== Products and services ===
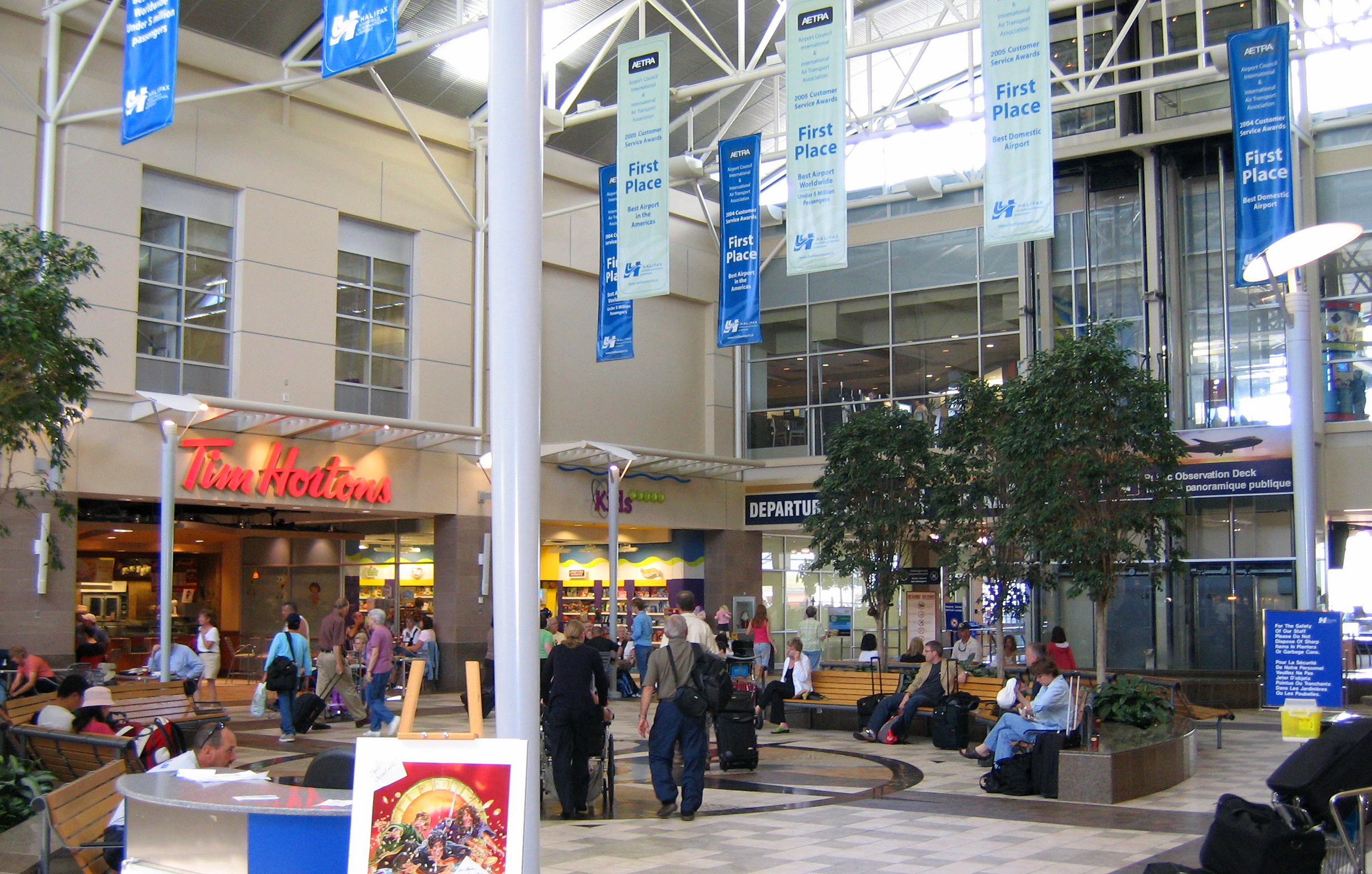
Food court and shops, Halifax Stanfield International Airport, Canada

Most major airports provide commercial outlets for products and services. Most of these companies, many of which are internationally known brands, are located within the departure areas. These include clothing boutiques and restaurants and in the US amounted to $4.2 billion in 2015. Prices charged for items sold at these outlets are generally higher than those outside the airport. However, some airports now regulate costs to keep them comparable to "street prices". This term is misleading as prices often match the manufacturers' suggested retail price (MSRP) but are almost never discounted.

Many new airports include walkthrough duty-free stores that require air passengers to enter a retail store upon exiting security.

Apart from major fast food chains, some airport restaurants offer regional cuisine specialties for those in transit so that they may sample local food without leaving the airport.

=== Premium and VIP services ===
Airports may also contain premium and VIP services. The premium and VIP services may include express check-in and dedicated check-in counters. These services are usually reserved for first and business class passengers, premium frequent flyers, and members of the airline's clubs. Premium services may sometimes be open to passengers who are members of a different airline's frequent flyer program. This can sometimes be part of a reciprocal deal, as when multiple airlines are part of the same alliance, or as a ploy to attract premium customers away from rival airlines.

Sometimes these premium services will be offered to a non-premium passenger if the airline has made a mistake in handling of the passenger, such as unreasonable delays or mishandling of checked baggage.

Airline lounges frequently offer free or reduced cost food, as well as alcoholic and non-alcoholic beverages. Lounges themselves typically have seating, showers, quiet areas, televisions, computer, Wi-Fi and Internet access, and power outlets that passengers may use for their electronic equipment. Some airline lounges employ baristas, bartenders and gourmet chefs.

Airlines sometimes operate multiple lounges within the one airport terminal allowing ultra-premium customers, such as first class customers, additional services, which are not available to other premium customers. Multiple lounges may also prevent overcrowding of the lounge facilities.

=== Cargo and freight service ===
In addition to people, airports move cargo around the clock. Cargo airlines often have their own on-site and adjacent infrastructure to transfer parcels between ground and air.

Cargo Terminal Facilities are areas where international airports export cargo has to be stored after customs clearance and prior to loading the aircraft. Similarly, import cargo that is offloaded needs to be in bond before the consignee decides to take delivery. Areas have to be kept aside for examination of export and import cargo by the airport authorities. Designated areas or sheds may be given to airlines or freight forward ring agencies.

Every cargo terminal has a landside and an airside. The landside is where the exporters and importers through either their agents or by themselves deliver or collect shipments while the airside is where loads are moved to or from the aircraft. In addition, cargo terminals are divided into distinct areas – export, import, and interline or transshipment.

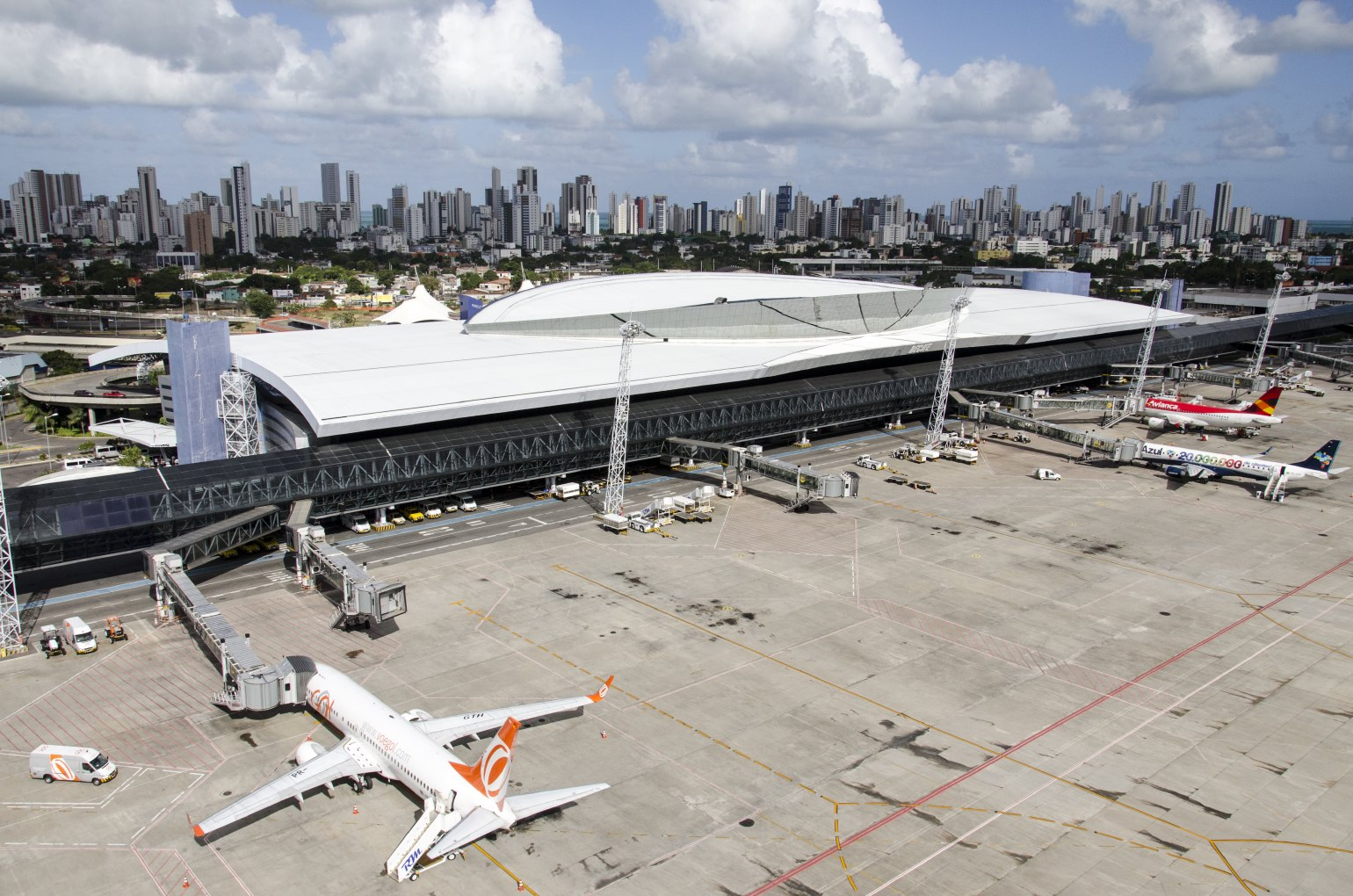
Recife International Airport in Recife, Brazil

=== Access and onward travel ===
Airports require parking lots, for passengers who may leave the cars at the airport for a long period of time. Large airports will also have car-rental firms, taxi ranks, bus stops and sometimes a train station.

Many large airports are located near railway trunk routes for seamless connection of multimodal transport, for instance Frankfurt Airport, Amsterdam Airport Schiphol, London Heathrow Airport, Tokyo Haneda Airport, Tokyo Narita Airport, Hamad International Airport, London Gatwick Airport and London Stansted Airport. It is also common to connect an airport and a city with rapid transit, light rail lines or other non-road public transport systems. Some examples of this would include the AirTrain JFK at John F. Kennedy International Airport in New York, Link light rail that runs from the heart of downtown Seattle to Seattle–Tacoma International Airport, and the Silver Line T at Boston's Logan International Airport by the Massachusetts Bay Transportation Authority (MBTA). Such a connection lowers risk of missed flights due to traffic congestion. Large airports usually have access also through controlled-access highways ('freeways' or 'motorways') from which motor vehicles enter either the departure loop or the arrival loop.

=== Internal transport ===
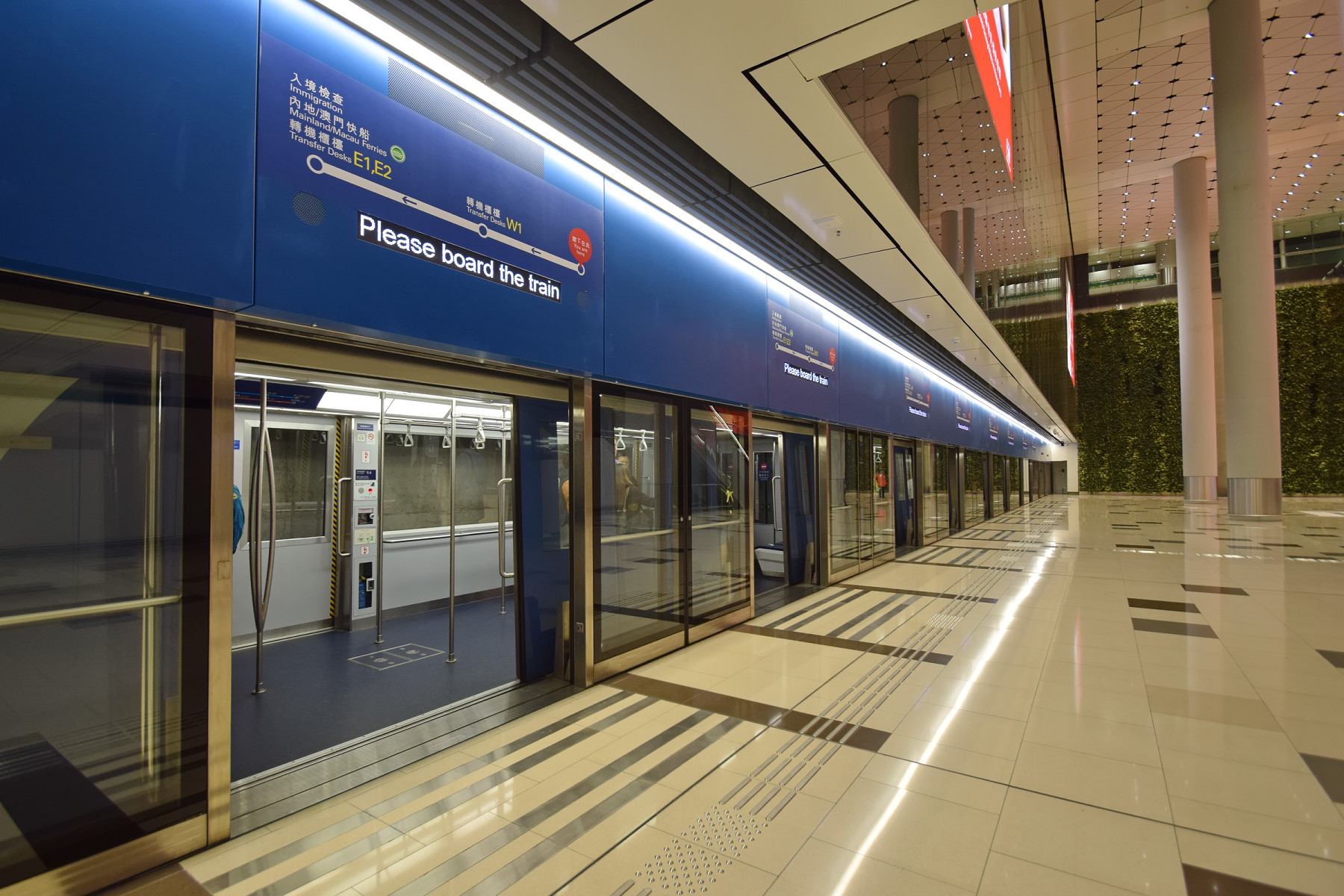
Automated People Mover system at Hong Kong International Airport

The distances passengers need to move within a large airport can be substantial. It is common for airports to provide moving walkways, buses, and rail transport systems. Some airports like Hartsfield–Jackson Atlanta International Airport and London Stansted Airport have a transit system that connects some of the gates to a main terminal. Airports with more than one terminal have a transit system to connect the terminals together, such as John F. Kennedy International Airport, Mexico City International Airport and London Gatwick Airport.

== Airport operations ==
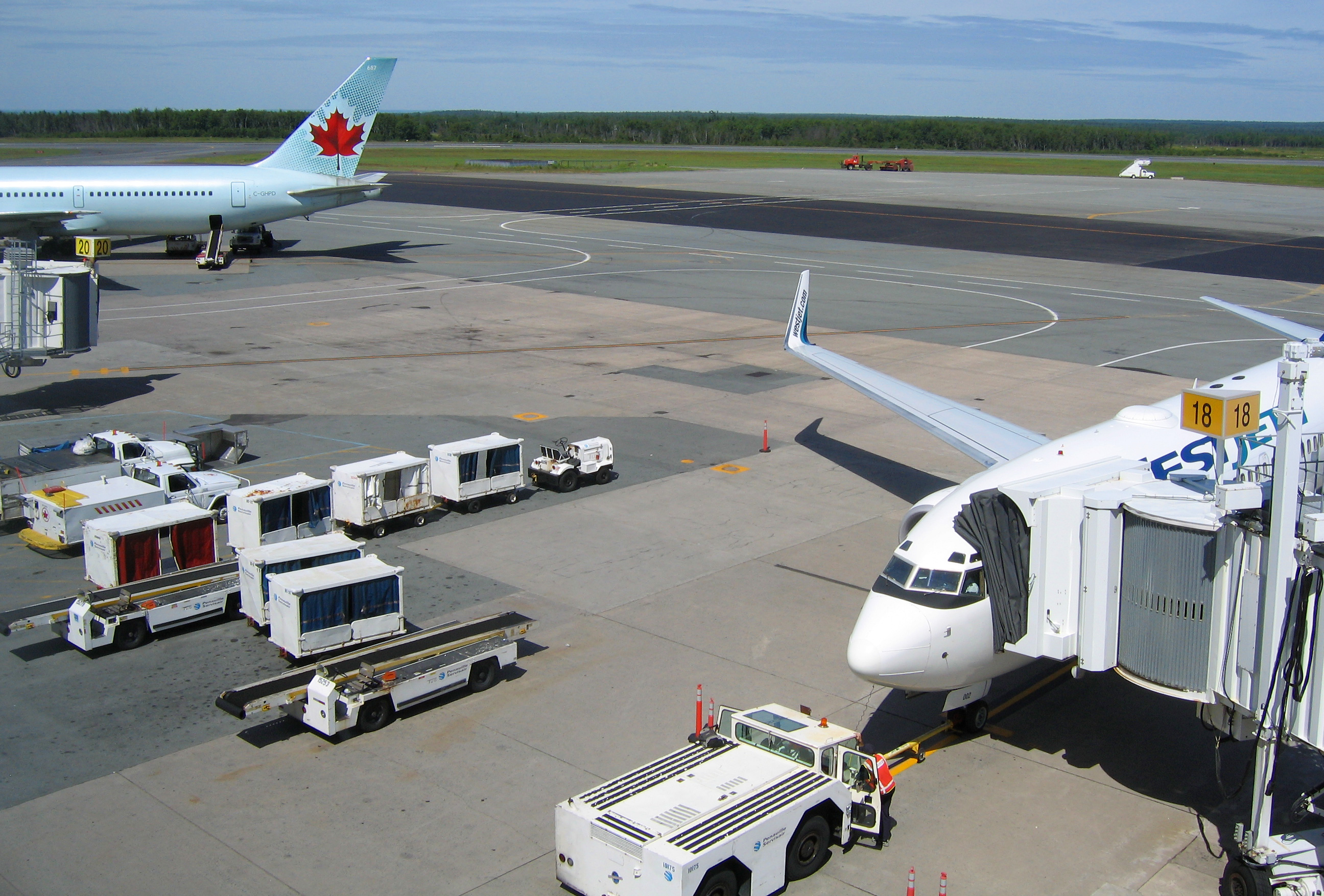
The apron from the top floor observation room, Halifax Stanfield International Airport, Canada

Airport operations are made possible by an organized network of trained personnel, specialized equipment, and spatial data. After thousands of ground operations staff left the industry during the COVID-19 pandemic, there have been discussions on the need for systemic improvements in three primary areas:

- Digitizing and automating processes

=== Air traffic control ===
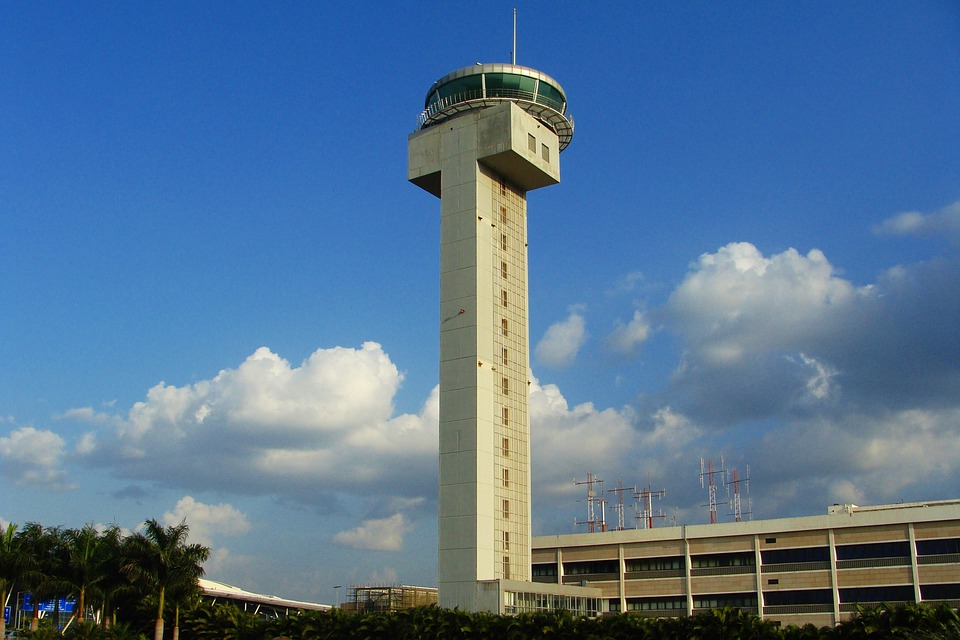
Airport Tower, Kempegowda International Airport

Air traffic controllers on the ground help direct aircraft through a region of airspace, communicating with aircraft to coordinate their paths. Their tasks include maintaining a safe distance between aircraft, avoiding congestion, and rerouting aircraft to deal with adverse weather. Most air traffic control centers can be divided into terminal control centers, which control the small, highly used region around an airport, and area control centers, which control aircraft en route to their destinations in a larger area. Both terminal and area control centers use radio to communicate with pilots and radar to track their paths, and in terminal control centers visual observation can also be used, as most aircraft near a terminal control center are either taking off or landing.

==== Ground control ====
Ground control is responsible for directing all ground traffic in designated "movement areas", except the traffic on runways. This includes planes, baggage trains, snowplows, grass cutters, fuel trucks, stair trucks, airline food trucks, conveyor belt vehicles and other vehicles. Ground Control will instruct these vehicles on which taxiways to use, which runway they will use (in the case of planes), where they will park, and when it is safe to cross runways. When a plane is ready to takeoff it will be turned over to tower control. Conversely, after a plane has landed it will depart the runway and be "handed over" from Tower to Ground Control.

==== Tower control ====
Tower control is responsible for aircraft on the runway and in the controlled airspace immediately surrounding the airport. Tower controllers may use radar to locate an aircraft's position in 3D space, or they may rely on pilot position reports and visual observation. They coordinate the sequencing of aircraft in the traffic pattern and direct aircraft on how to safely join and leave the circuit. Aircraft which are only passing through the airspace must also contact tower control to be sure they remain clear of other traffic.

=== Traffic pattern ===
Left-hand circuit pattern

At all airports the use of a traffic pattern (often called a traffic circuit outside the US) is possible. They may help to assure smooth traffic flow between departing and arriving aircraft. There is no technical need within modern commercial aviation for performing this pattern, provided there is no queue. And due to the so-called SLOT-times, the overall traffic planning tend to assure landing queues are avoided. If for instance an aircraft approaches runway 17 (which has a heading of approx. 170 degrees) from the north (coming from 360/0 degrees heading towards 180 degrees), the aircraft will land as fast as possible by just turning 10 degrees and follow the glidepath, without orbit the runway for visual reasons, whenever this is possible. For smaller piston engined airplanes at smaller airfields without ILS equipment, things are very different though.

Generally, this pattern is a circuit consisting of five "legs" that form a rectangle (two legs and the runway form one side, with the remaining legs forming three more sides). Each leg is named (see diagram), and ATC directs pilots on how to join and leave the circuit. Traffic patterns are flown at one specific altitude, usually 800 or 1,000 ft (244 or 305 m) above ground level (AGL). Standard traffic patterns are left-handed, meaning all turns are made to the left. One of the main reason for this is that pilots sit on the left side of the airplane, and a Left-hand patterns improves their visibility of the airport and pattern. Right-handed patterns do exist, usually because of obstacles such as a mountain, or to reduce noise for local residents. The predetermined circuit helps traffic flow smoothly because all pilots know what to expect, and helps reduce the chance of a mid-air collision.

At controlled airports, a circuit can be in place but is not normally used. Rather, aircraft (usually only commercial with long routes) request approach clearance while they are still hours away from the airport; the destination airport can then plan a queue of arrivals, and planes will be guided into one queue per active runway for a "straight-in" approach. While this system keeps the airspace free and is simpler for pilots, it requires detailed knowledge of how aircraft are planning to use the airport ahead of time and is therefore only possible with large commercial airliners on pre-scheduled flights. The system has recently become so advanced that controllers can predict whether an aircraft will be delayed on landing before it even takes off; that aircraft can then be delayed on the ground, rather than wasting expensive fuel waiting in the air.

=== Navigational aids ===
There are a number of aids, both visual and electronic, though not at all airports. A visual approach slope indicator (VASI) helps pilots fly the approach for landing. Some airports are equipped with a VHF omnidirectional range (VOR) to help pilots find the direction to the airport. VORs are often accompanied by a distance measuring equipment (DME) to determine the distance to the VOR. VORs are also located off airports, where they serve to provide airways for aircraft to navigate upon. In poor weather, pilots will use an instrument landing system (ILS) to find the runway and fly the correct approach, even if they cannot see the ground. The number of instrument approaches based on the use of the Global Positioning System (GPS) is rapidly increasing and may eventually become the primary means for instrument landings.

Larger airports sometimes offer precision approach radar (PAR), but these systems are more common at military air bases than civilian airports. The aircraft's horizontal and vertical movement is tracked via radar, and the controller tells the pilot his position relative to the approach slope. Once the pilots can see the runway lights, they may continue with a visual landing.

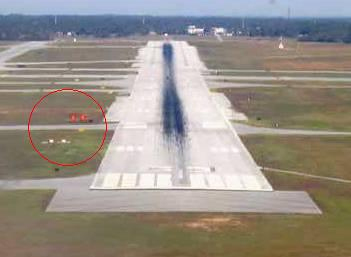
Standard visual approach slope indicator

=== Taxiway signs ===
Airport guidance signs provide direction and information to taxiing aircraft and airport vehicles. Smaller aerodromes may have few or no signs, relying instead on diagrams and charts.

=== Lighting ===
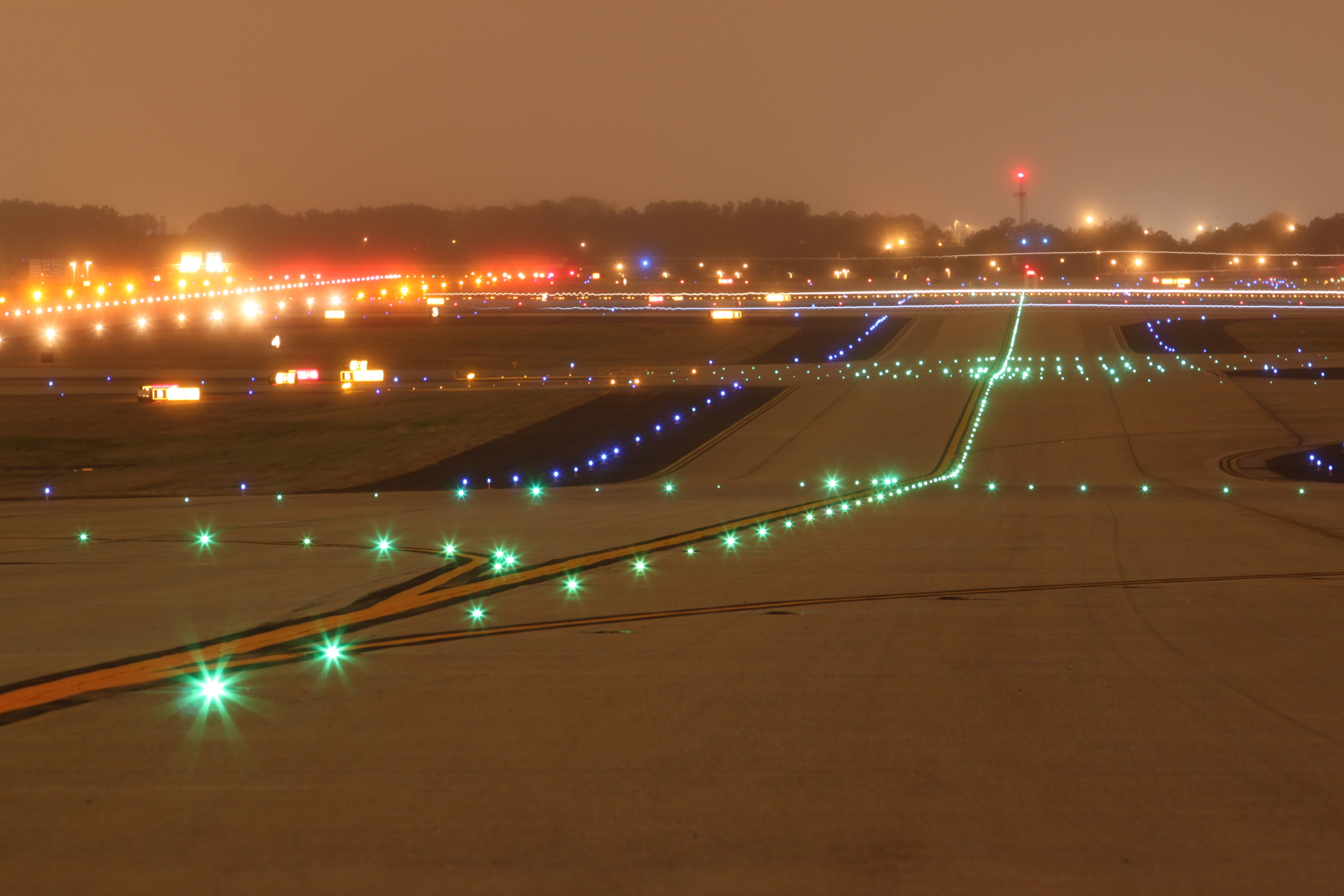
Airport lighting

Taxiway lights use color codes to mark out different sections of the taxiway. Blue lights normally indicate the edge of the taxiway, and green lights are located in its center. Red lights are placed where the runway begins, and are turned off once the pilot has gained clearance from the air traffic control to take off.

=== Weather observations ===
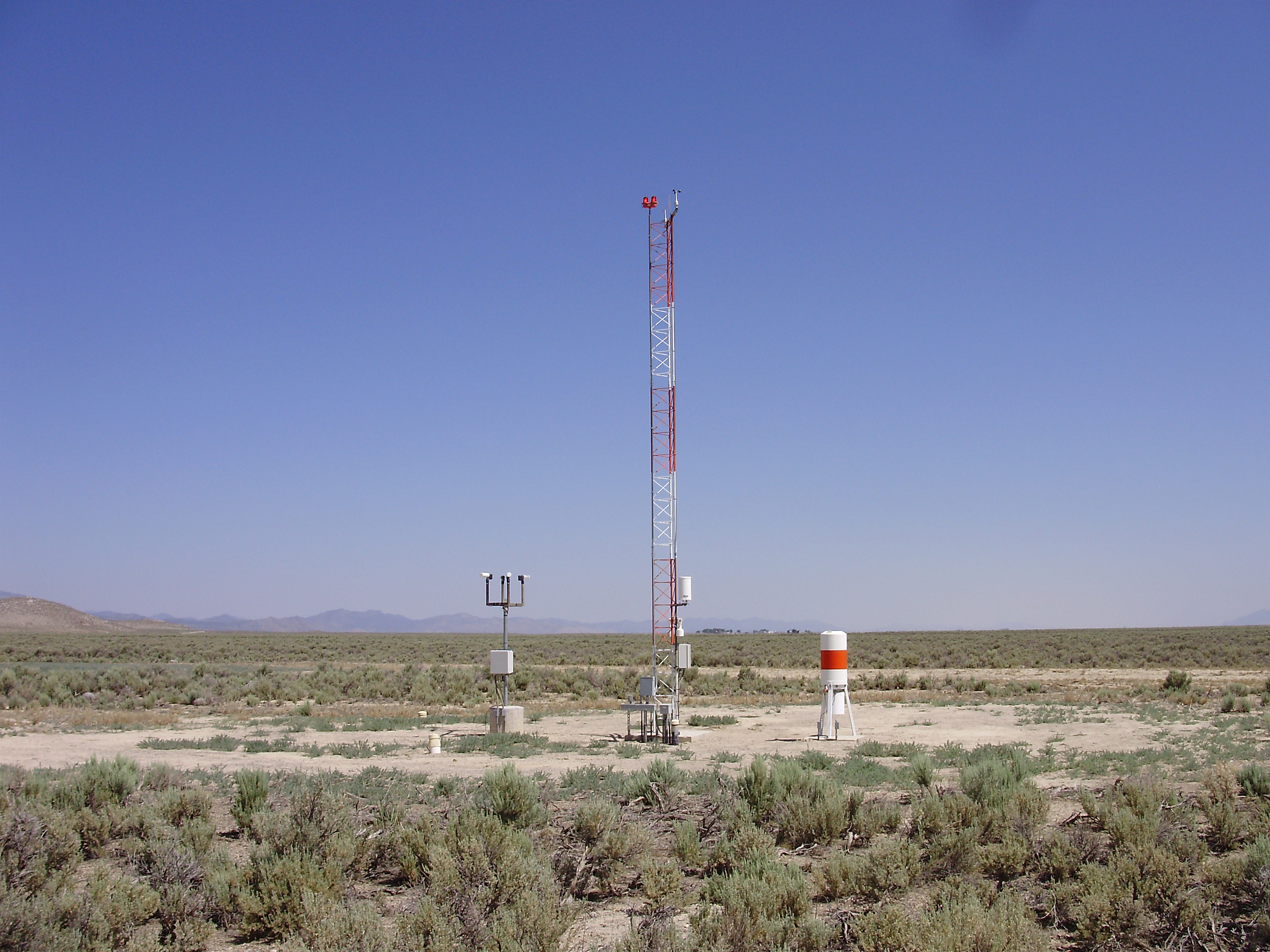
Automated weather system

Weather observations at the airport are crucial to safe takeoffs and landings. In the United States and Canada, the vast majority of airports, large and small, will either have some form of automated airport weather station, whether an AWOS, ASOS, or AWSS, a human observer or a combination of the two. These weather observations, predominantly in the METAR format, are available over the radio, through automatic terminal information service (ATIS), via the ATC or the flight service station.

Planes take-off and land into the wind to achieve maximum performance. Because pilots need instantaneous information during landing, a windsock can also be kept in view of the runway. Aviation windsocks are made with lightweight material, withstand strong winds and some are lit up after dark or in foggy weather. Because visibility of windsocks is limited, often multiple glow-orange windsocks are placed on both sides of the runway.

=== Airport ground crew (ground handling) ===
Each airport hires its own ground crew to process flights, cargo, passengers, and baggage. When a flight arrives, ramp services navigate a baggage cart to the aircraft. Bags are then sorted and transported by baggage handlers. Ramp services handle aircraft marshaling, the process in which aircraft arrive or depart from the gate. Once passengers and/or cargo is unloaded, a cleaning crew prepares the aircraft for its next flight by loading supplies and preparing other in-flight services. Ground crew will fuel the aircraft, and other visual inspections are conducted. Efficient work allows aircraft to have fast turnaround times of as little as 25 minutes.

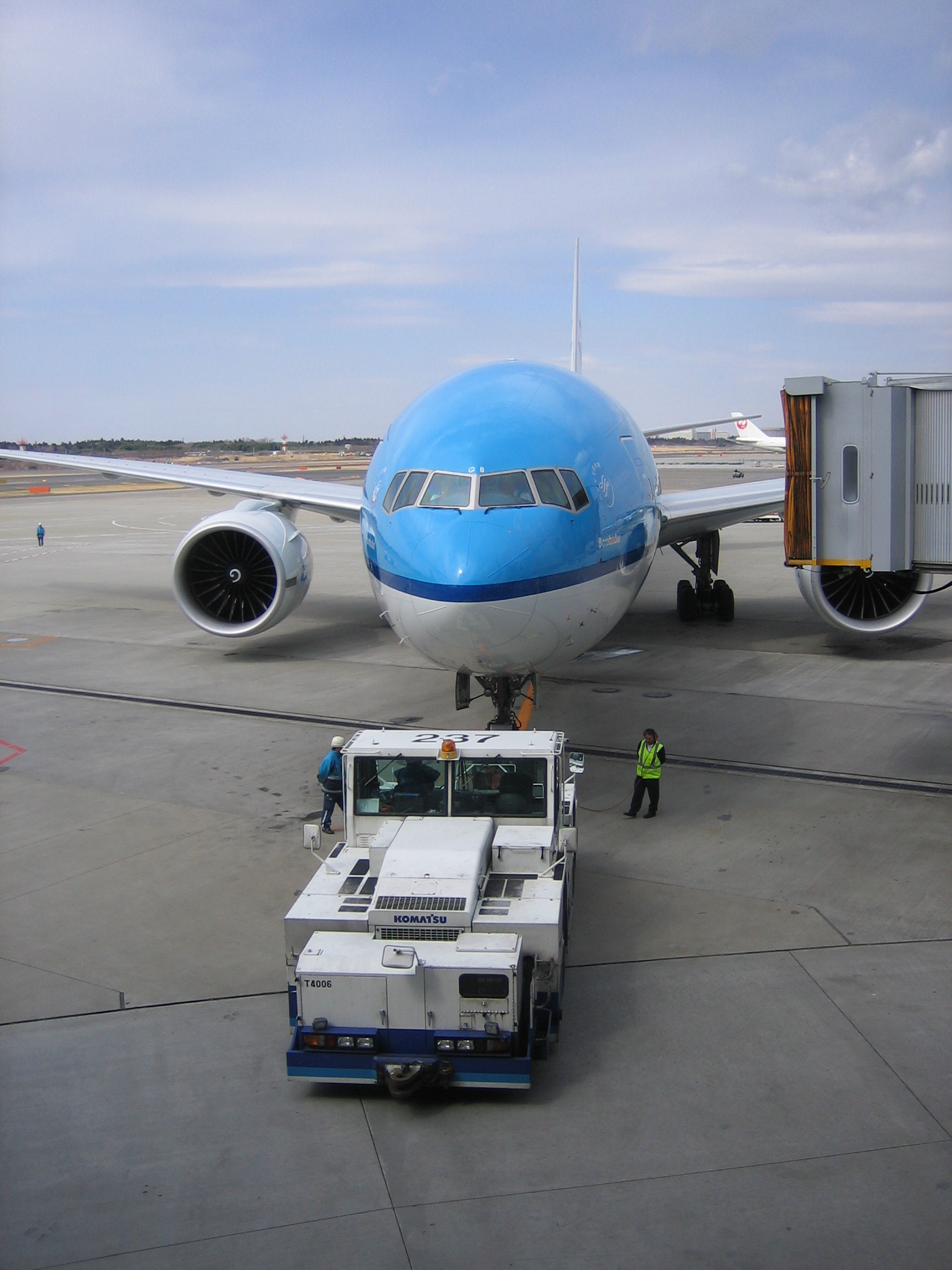
An aircraft tow tractor moving a KLM Boeing 777 at Tokyo Narita

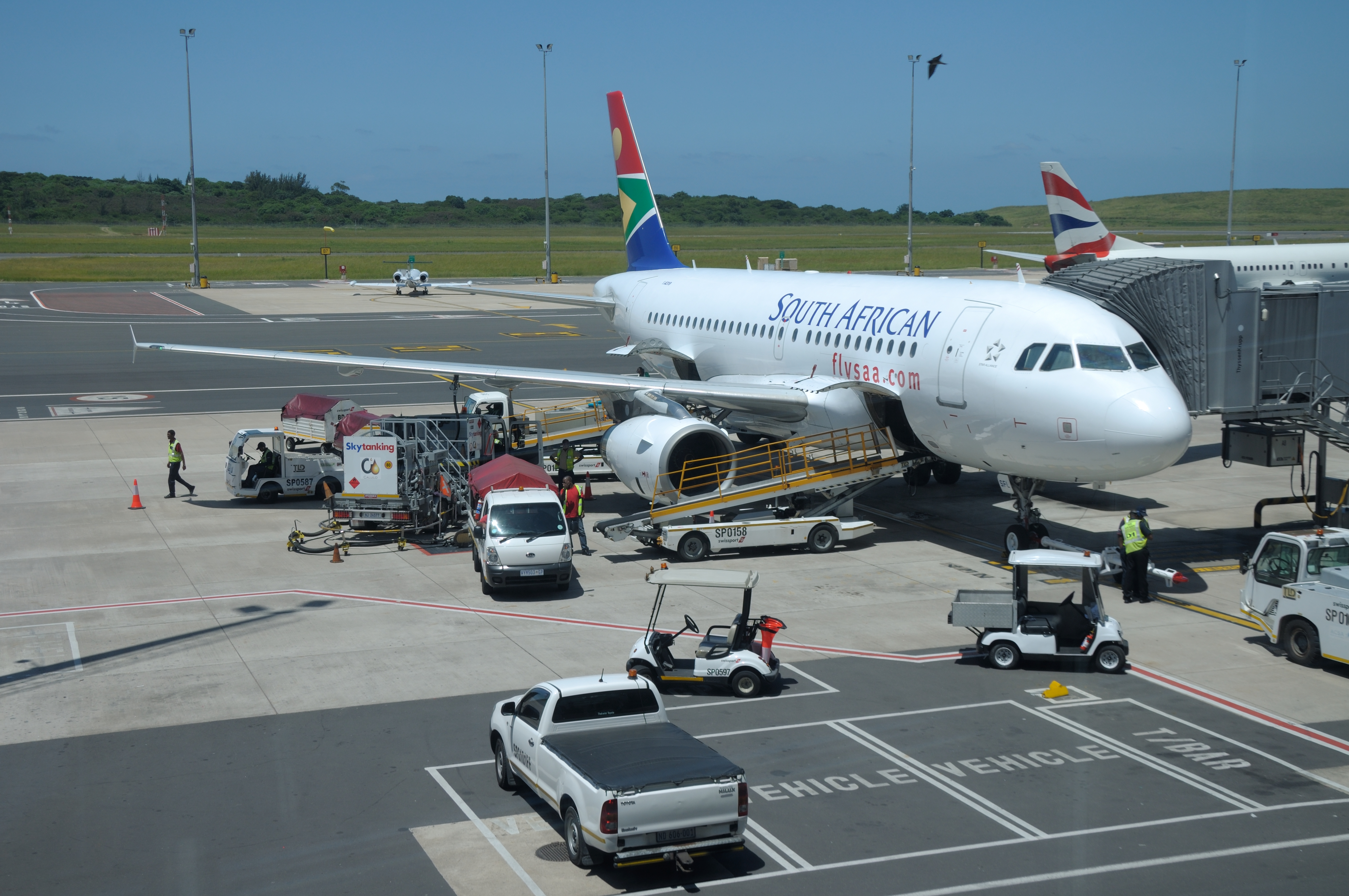
Ground operations with a South African Airways Airbus A320-200 at Durban's King Shaka International Airport

Time-lapse (tilt-shifted) of ground crew operations at Osaka International Airport

=== Maintenance management ===
Like industrial equipment or facility management, airports require tailor-made maintenance management due to their complexity. With many tangible assets spread over a large area in different environments, these infrastructures must therefore effectively monitor these assets and store spare parts to maintain them at an optimal level of service.

To manage these airport assets, several solutions are competing for the market: CMMS (computerized maintenance management system) predominate, and mainly enable a company's maintenance activity to be monitored, planned, recorded and rationalized.

=== Safety management ===
Aviation safety is an important concern in the operation of an airport, and almost every airfield includes equipment and procedures for handling emergency situations. Airport crash tender crews are equipped for dealing with airfield accidents, crew and passenger extractions, and the hazards of highly flammable aviation fuel. The crews are also trained to deal with situations such as bomb threats, hijacking, and terrorist activities.

Hazards to aircraft include debris, nesting birds, and reduced friction levels due to environmental conditions such as ice, snow, or rain. Part of runway maintenance is airfield rubber removal which helps maintain friction levels. The fields must be kept clear of debris using cleaning equipment so that loose material does not become a projectile and enter an engine duct (see foreign object damage). In adverse weather conditions, ice and snow clearing equipment can be used to improve traction on the landing strip. For waiting aircraft, equipment is used to spray special deicing fluids on the wings.

Many airports are built near open fields or wetlands. These tend to attract bird populations, which can pose a hazard to aircraft in the form of bird strikes. Airport crews often need to discourage birds from taking up residence.

Some airports are located next to parks, golf courses, or other low-density uses of land. Other airports are located near densely populated urban or suburban areas.

An airport can have areas where collisions between aircraft on the ground tend to occur. Records are kept of any incursions where aircraft or vehicles are in an inappropriate location, allowing these "hot spots" to be identified. These locations then undergo special attention by transportation authorities (such as the FAA in the US) and airport administrators.

During the 1980s, a phenomenon known as microburst became a growing concern due to aircraft accidents caused by microburst wind shear, such as Delta Air Lines Flight 191. Microburst radar was developed as an aid to safety during landing, giving two to five minutes' warning to aircraft in the vicinity of the field of a microburst event.

Some airfields now have a special surface known as soft concrete at the end of the runway (stopway or blastpad) that behaves somewhat like styrofoam, bringing the plane to a relatively rapid halt as the material disintegrates. These surfaces are useful when the runway is located next to a body of water or other hazard, and prevent the planes from overrunning the end of the field.

Airports often have on-site firefighters to respond to emergencies. These use specialized vehicles, known as airport crash tenders. Most civil aviation authorities have required levels of on-site emergency response capabilities based on an airport's traffic. At airports where civil and military operations share a common set of runways and infrastructure, emergency response is often managed by the relevant military unit as part of their base's operations.

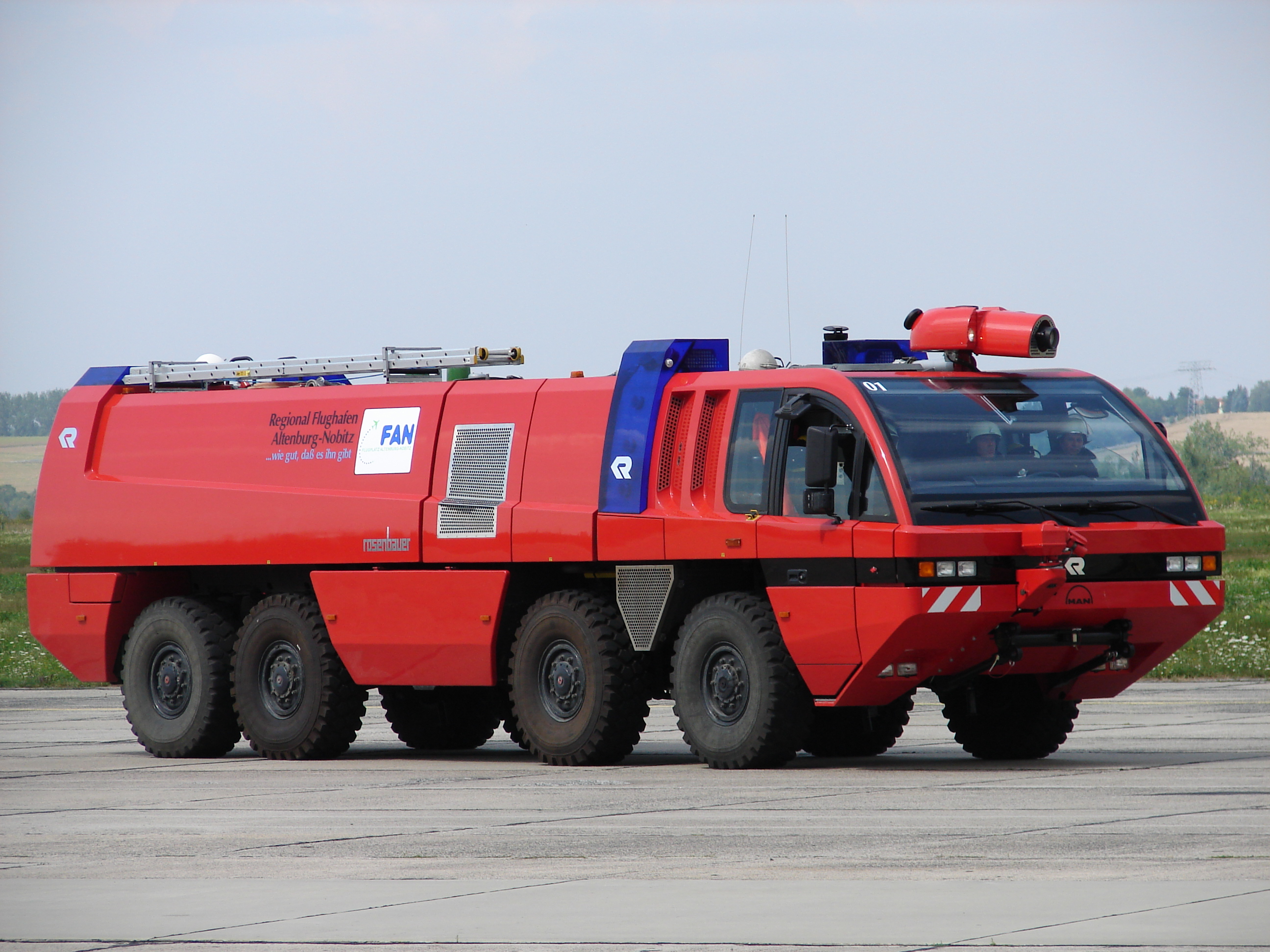
"FLF Panther" airport crash tender in Germany

Road crossing of (Shetland) A970 with Sumburgh Airport's runway. The movable barrier closes when aircraft land or take off.

== Environmental concerns and sustainability ==
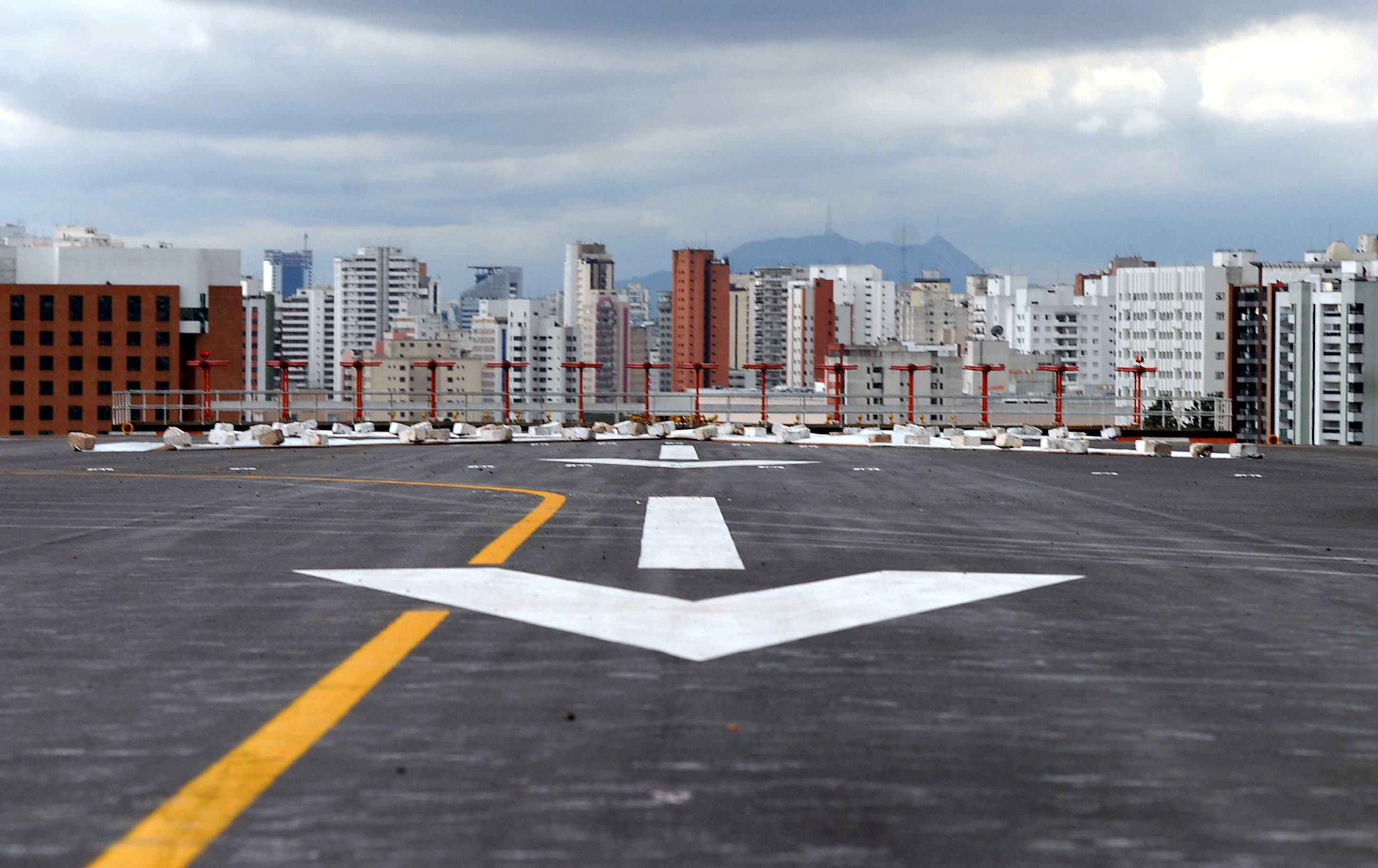
Runway at São Paulo-Congonhas Airport in Brazil

Aircraft noise is a major cause of noise disturbance to residents living near airports. Sleep can be affected if the airports operate night and early morning flights. Aircraft noise occurs not only from take-offs and landings but also from ground operations including maintenance and testing of aircraft. Noise can have other health effects as well. Other noises and environmental concerns are vehicle traffic causing noise and pollution on roads leading to the airport.

The construction of new airports or addition of runways to existing airports, is often resisted by local residents because of the effect on countryside, historical sites, and local flora and fauna. Due to the risk of collision between birds and aircraft, large airports undertake population control programs where they frighten or shoot birds.

The construction of airports has been known to change local weather patterns. For example, because they often flatten out large areas, they can be susceptible to fog in areas where fog rarely forms. In addition, they generally replace trees and grass with pavement, they often change drainage patterns in agricultural areas, leading to more flooding, run-off and erosion in the surrounding land. Airports are often built on low-lying coastal land, globally 269 airports are at risk of coastal flooding now. A temperature rise of 2 °C – consistent with the Paris Agreement – would lead to 100 airports being below mean sea level and 364 airports at risk of flooding. If global mean temperature rise exceeds this then as many as 572 airports will be at risk by 2100, leading to major disruptions without appropriate adaptation.

A 2019 report from the Cooperative Research Programs of the US Transportation Research Board showed all airports have a role to play in advancing greenhouse gas (GHG) reduction initiatives. Small airports have demonstrated leadership by using their less complex organizational structure to implement newer technologies and to serve as a proving ground for their feasibility. Large airports have the economic stability and staff resources necessary to grow in-house expertise and fund comprehensive new programs.

A growing number of airports are installing solar photovoltaic arrays to offset their electricity use. The National Renewable Energy Lab has shown this can be done safely. This can also be done on the roofs of the airports and it has been found that the solar panels on these buildings work more effectively when compared to residential panels.

The world's first airport to be fully powered by solar energy is located at Kochi, India.

As a part of their sustainability efforts, more and more airports are starting to explore the consequences of more electric aircraft coming into service. Electric aircraft require much energy; operating 49 small 50-passenger short-range battery electric aircraft would demand at least 16 GWh/year, and with short turnaround times between different flights, the charging powers have to be substantial. To tackle these issues, more airports are starting to look into alternative energy production such as solar power and wind power, but also how to use airport areas for biomass production. Another solution investigated is to use energy storage to charge during the night and use to charge the aircraft during daytime.

== Airport hygiene and public health concerns ==
Airports, as major international travel hubs, have the potential to be significant transmission points for infectious diseases. A notable study conducted during the peak of the 2015–2016 flu season at Helsinki-Vantaa airport in Finland revealed that commonly touched surfaces in airports, especially the plastic security screening trays, are highly susceptible to contamination by respiratory viruses. These trays are touched by hundreds of passengers daily and, being made of plastic, a non-porous material, provide an environment where viruses can survive for extended periods. In comparison, bathroom surfaces in the same airport tested negative for respiratory viruses, possibly indicating a heightened awareness of hygiene in these spaces.

Hand hygiene plays a pivotal role in preventing the spread of infectious diseases in airports. Research indicates that only about 70% of individuals wash their hands after using the toilet, and of those, only 50% do so correctly. In airport settings, just one in five individuals maintain clean hands—defined as washing with soap for at least 15 seconds in the preceding hour. Given the frequent touching of shared surfaces in airports, such as trays, railings, and touch panels, this poses a significant risk for disease transmission. A study from the University of Cyprus and MIT used models and simulations to demonstrate that increasing hand cleanliness from 20% to 30% in all airports could reduce the potential global impact of a disease by 24%. If cleanliness levels reached 60%, this impact could decrease by 69%. Focusing on just the top 10 most influential airports for disease spread, enhancing hand hygiene practices could still significantly reduce disease transmission rates from 45% to 37%. The findings underscore the importance of promoting hand-washing in airports as a key measure in preventing the global spread of diseases.

== Military air base ==
An airbase, sometimes referred to as an air station or airfield, provides basing and support of military aircraft. Some airbases, known as military airports, provide facilities similar to their civilian counterparts. For example, RAF Brize Norton in the UK has a terminal that caters to passengers for the Royal Air Force's scheduled flights to the Falkland Islands. Some airbases are co-located with civilian airports, sharing the same ATC facilities, runways, taxiways and emergency services, but with separate terminals, parking areas and hangars. Bardufoss Airport, Bardufoss Air Station in Norway and Pune Airport in India are examples of this.

An aircraft carrier is a warship that functions as a mobile airbase. Aircraft carriers allow a naval force to project air power without having to depend on local bases for land-based aircraft. After their development in World War I, aircraft carriers replaced the battleship as the centrepiece of a modern fleet during World War II.

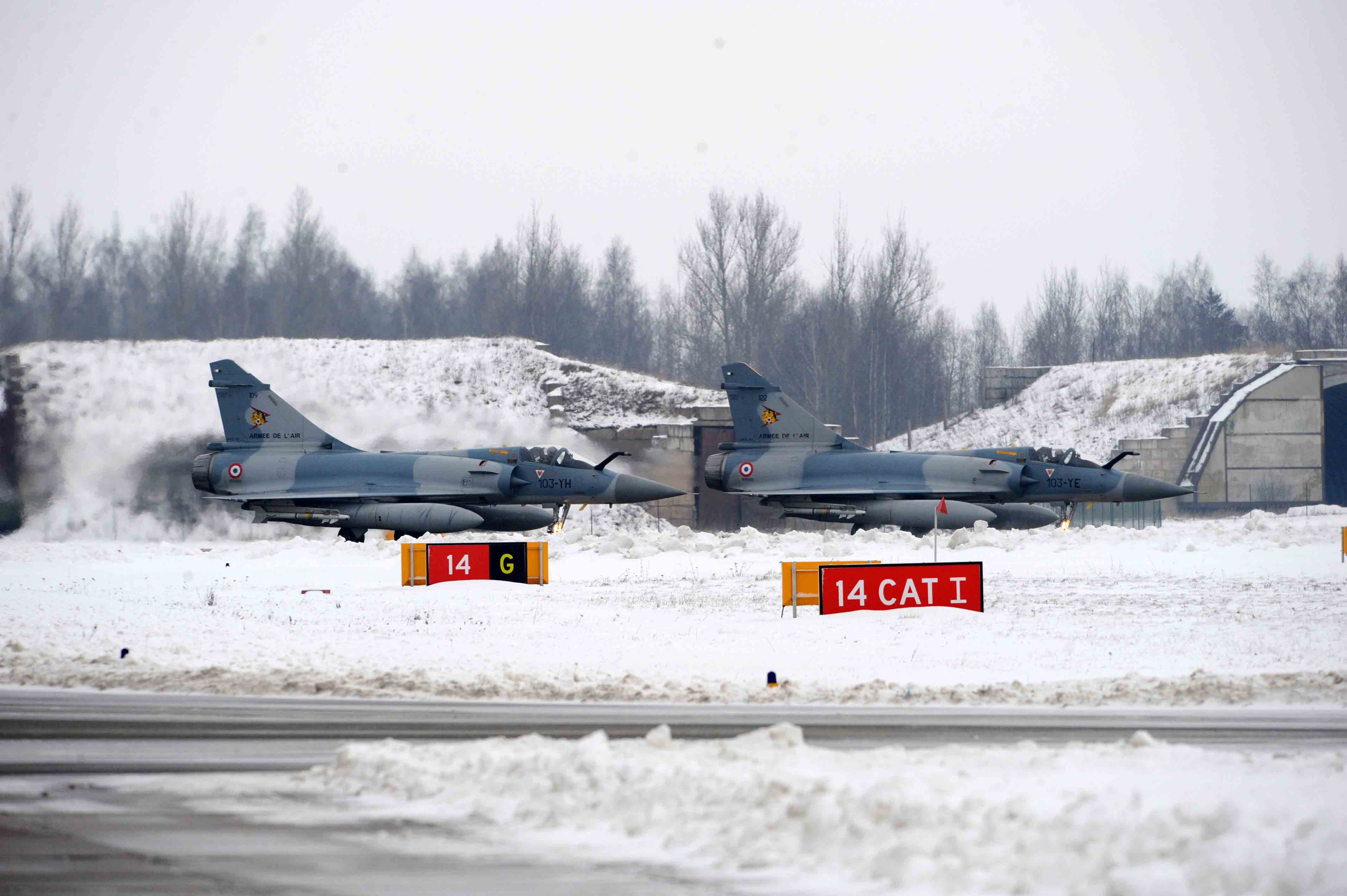
Fighter aircraft at an airbase in Lithuania

== Airport designation and naming ==
Most airports in the United States are designated "private-use airports" meaning that, whether publicly- or privately owned, the airport is not open or available for use by the public (although use of the airport may be made available by invitation of the owner or manager).

Most airport names include the location. Many airport names honour a public figure, commonly a politician (e.g., Charles de Gaulle Airport, George Bush Intercontinental Airport, Lennart Meri Airport, O.R. Tambo International Airport, Soekarno–Hatta International Airport), a monarch (e.g. Chhatrapati Shivaji International Airport, King Shaka International Airport), a cultural leader (e.g. Liverpool John Lennon Airport, Leonardo da Vinci-Fiumicino Airport, Louis Armstrong New Orleans International Airport) or a prominent figure in aviation history of the region (e.g. Sydney Kingsford Smith Airport), sometimes even famous writers (e.g. Allama Iqbal International Airport) and explorers (e.g. Venice Marco Polo Airport).

Some airport names include the word "International" to indicate their ability to handle international air traffic. This includes some airports that do not have scheduled international airline services (e.g. Port Elizabeth International Airport).

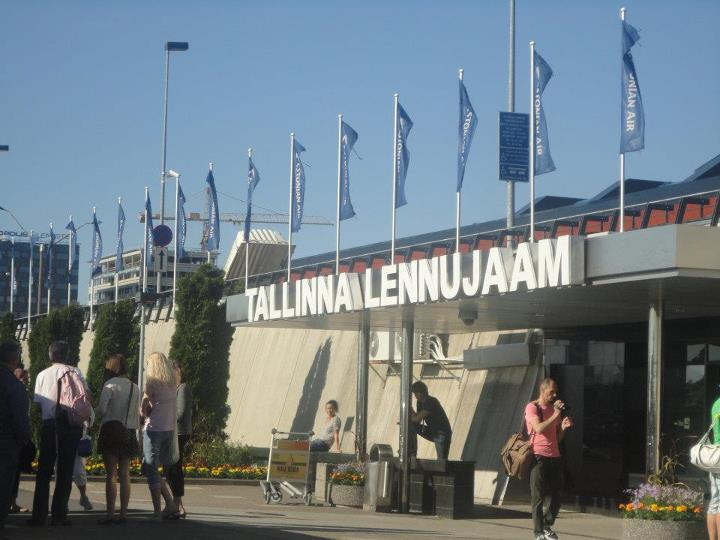
Entrance of Tallinn Airport, also known as Lennart Meri Airport

== History and development ==
The earliest aircraft takeoff and landing sites were grassy fields. The plane could approach at any angle that provided a favorable wind direction. A slight improvement was the dirt-only field, which eliminated the drag from grass. However, these functioned well only in dry conditions. Later, concrete surfaces would allow landings regardless of meteorological conditions.

The title of world's oldest airport is disputed. Toussus-le-Noble airport near Paris was established in 1907 and has been operating since. College Park Airport in Maryland, US, established in 1909 by Wilbur Wright serves only general aviation traffic.

Beijing Nanyuan Airport in China, which was built to accommodate planes in 1904, and airships in 1907, opened in 1910. It was in operation until September 2019. Pearson Field Airport in Vancouver, Washington, United States, was built to accommodate planes in 1905 and airships in 1911, and is still in use as of April 2026.

Hamburg Airport opened in January 1911, making it the oldest commercial airport in the world which is still in operation. Bremen Airport opened in 1913 and remains in use, although it served as an American military field between 1945 and 1949. Amsterdam Airport Schiphol opened on September 16, 1916, as a military airfield, but has accepted civil aircraft only since December 17, 1920, allowing Sydney Airport—which started operations in January 1920—to claim to be one of the world's oldest continuously operating commercial airports. Minneapolis-Saint Paul International Airport in the US opened in 1920 and has been in continuous commercial service since. It serves about 35,000,000 passengers each year and continues to expand, recently opening a new 11,000-foot (3,355 m) runway. Of the airports constructed during this early period in aviation, it is one of the largest and busiest that is still currently operating. Don Mueang International Airport near Bangkok, Thailand, opened 1914, is also a contender, as well as the Rome Ciampino Airport, which opened in 1916. Increased aircraft traffic during World War I led to the construction of landing fields. Aircraft had to approach these from certain directions and this led to the development of aids for directing the approach and landing slope.

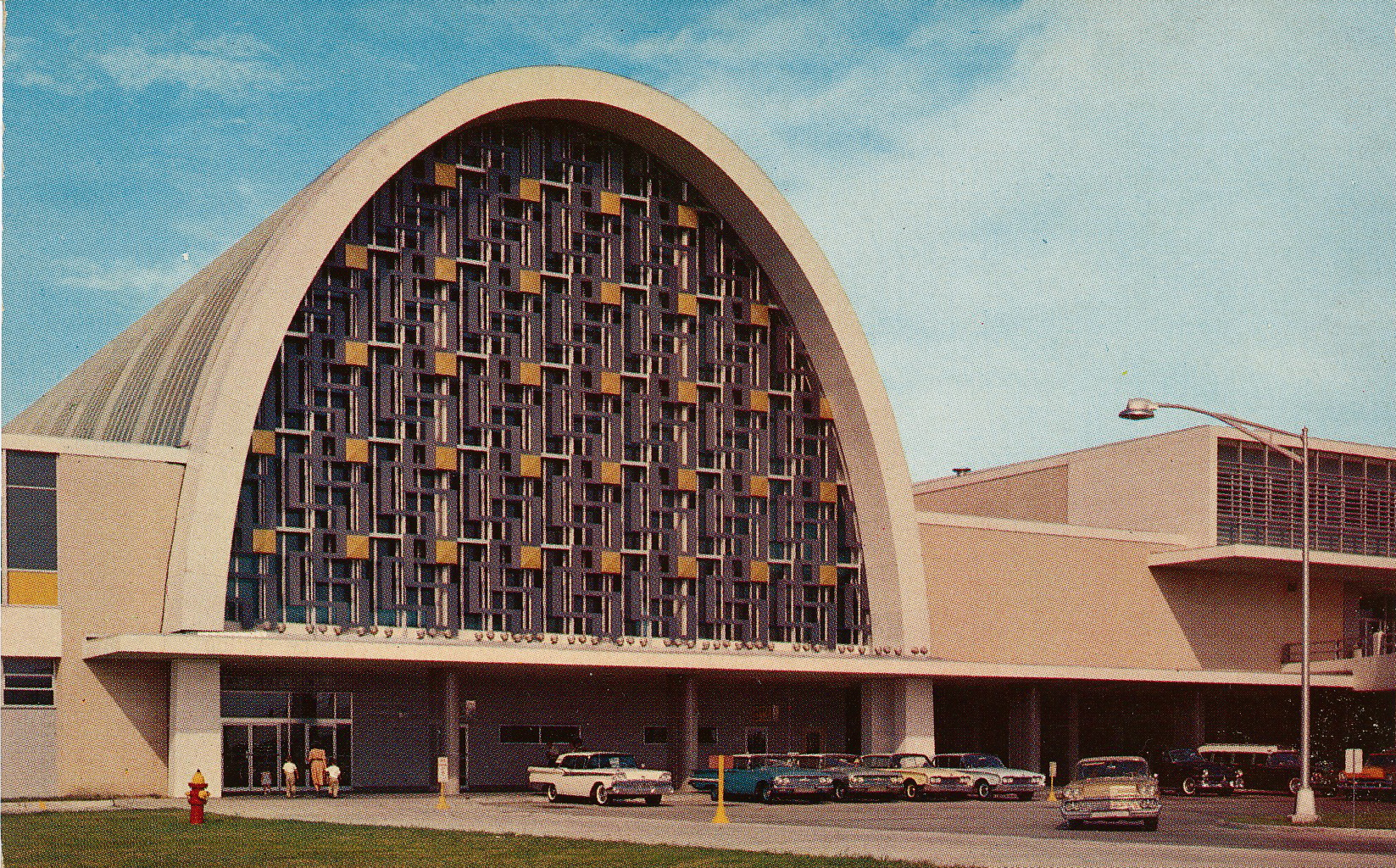
The New Orleans International Airport passenger terminal building in New Orleans (1960s)

Following the war, some of these military airfields added civil facilities for handling passenger traffic. One of the earliest such fields was Paris – Le Bourget Airport at Le Bourget, near Paris. The first airport to operate scheduled international commercial services was Hounslow Heath Aerodrome in August 1919, but it was closed and supplanted by Croydon Airport in March 1920. In 1922, the first permanent airport and commercial terminal solely for commercial aviation was opened at Flughafen Devau near what was then Königsberg, East Prussia. The airports of this era used a paved "apron", which permitted night flying as well as landing heavier aircraft.

The first lighting used on an airport was during the latter part of the 1920s; in the 1930s approach lighting came into use. These indicated the proper direction and angle of descent. The colours and flash intervals of these lights became standardized under the International Civil Aviation Organization (ICAO). In the 1940s, the slope-line approach system was introduced. This consisted of two rows of lights that formed a funnel indicating an aircraft's position on the glideslope. Additional lights indicated incorrect altitude and direction.

After World War II, airport design became more sophisticated. Passenger buildings were being grouped together in an island, with runways arranged in groups about the terminal. This arrangement permitted expansion of the facilities. But it also meant that passengers had to travel further to reach their plane.

An improvement in the landing field was the introduction of grooves in the concrete surface. These run perpendicular to the direction of the landing aircraft and serve to draw off excess rainwater that could build up in front of the plane's wheels.

Airport construction boomed during the 1960s with the increase in jet aircraft traffic. Runways were extended out to 3,000 m (9,800 ft). The fields were constructed out of reinforced concrete using a slip-form machine that produces a continuous slab with no disruptions along the length. The early 1960s also saw the introduction of jet bridge systems to modern airport terminals, an innovation which eliminated outdoor passenger boarding. These systems became commonplace in the United States by the 1970s.

The malicious use of UAVs has led to the deployment of counter unmanned air system (C-UAS) technologies such as the Aaronia AARTOS which have been installed on major international airports.

== Airports in entertainment ==
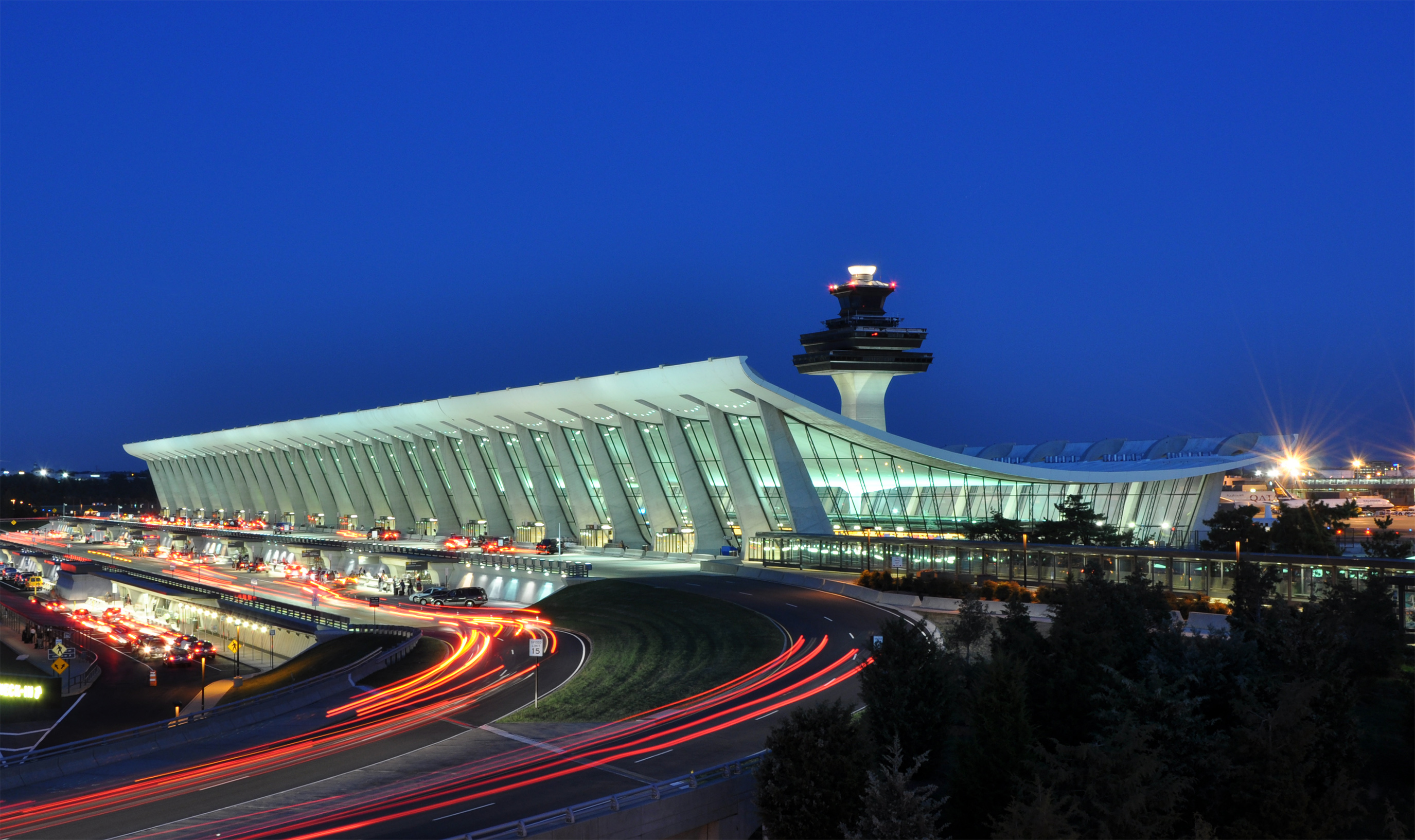
Washington Dulles International Airport, ostensibly the setting for Die Hard 2; the film was actually filmed at Los Angeles International Airport

Airports have played major roles in films and television programs due to their very nature as a transport and international hub, and sometimes because of distinctive architectural features of particular airports. One such example of this is The Terminal, a film about a man who becomes permanently grounded in an airport terminal and must survive only on the food and shelter provided by the airport. They are also one of the major elements in movies such as The V.I.P.s, Speed, Airplane!, Airport (1970), Die Hard 2, Soul Plane, Jackie Brown, Get Shorty, Home Alone (1990), Home Alone 2: Lost in New York (1992), Liar Liar, Passenger 57, Final Destination (2000), Unaccompanied Minors, Catch Me If You Can, Rendition and The Langoliers. They have also played important parts in television series like Lost, The Amazing Race, America's Next Topmodel season 10, 90 Day Fiancé, Air Crash Investigation which have significant parts of their story set within airports. In other programmes and films, airports are merely indicative of journeys, e.g. Good Will Hunting.

Several computer simulation games put the player in charge of an airport. These include the Airport Tycoon series, SimAirport and Airport CEO.

== Airport directories ==
Each civil aviation authority provides a source of information about airports in their country. This will contain information on airport elevation, airport lighting, runway information, communications facilities and frequencies, hours of operation, nearby NAVAIDs and contact information where prior arrangement for landing is necessary.

Australia
Information can be found on-line in the En route Supplement Australia (ERSA) which is published by Airservices Australia, a government owned corporation charged with managing Australian ATC.

Brazil
Infraero is responsible for the airports in Brazil

Canada
Two publications, the Canada Flight Supplement (CFS) and the Water Aerodrome Supplement, published by Nav Canada under the authority of Transport Canada provides equivalent information.

Europe
The European Organisation for the Safety of Air Navigation (EUROCONTROL) provides an Aeronautical Information Publication (AIP), aeronautical charts and NOTAM services for multiple European countries.

Germany
Provided by the Luftfahrt-Bundesamt (Federal Office for Civil Aviation of Germany).

France
Aviation Generale Delage edited by Delville and published by Breitling.

The United Kingdom
The information is found in Pooley's Flight Guide, a publication compiled with the assistance of the United Kingdom Civil Aviation Authority (CAA). Pooley's also contains information on some continental European airports that are close to Great Britain. National Air Traffic Services, the UK's Air Navigation Service Provider, a public–private partnership also publishes an online AIP for the UK.

The United States
The US uses the Airport/Facility Directory (A/FD) (now officially termed the Chart Supplement) published in seven volumes. DAFIF also includes extensive airport data but has been unavailable to the public at large since 2006.

Japan
Aeronautical Information Publication (AIP) is provided by Japan Aeronautical Information Service Center, under the authority of Japan Civil Aviation Bureau, Ministry of Land, Infrastructure, Transport and Tourism of Japan.

A comprehensive, consumer/business directory of commercial airports in the world (primarily for airports as businesses, rather than for pilots) is organized by the trade group Airports Council International.

== Standards ==
- ICAO Annex 14, Volume I, Aerodrome Design and Operations
- ICAO Doc 9137, Airport Services Manual (ASM)
- ICAO Doc 4444, Procedures for Air Navigation Services (PANS)- Air Traffic Management
- ICAO Doc 9157, Aerodrome Design Manual (ADM)

== See also ==
- Airpark
- Altiport
- Environmental effects of aviation
- Model airport
- Seaplane base

Lists

- Index of aviation articles
- List of the busiest airports
- List of cities with more than one commercial airport
- List of countries without an airport
- List of defunct international airports
- List of hub airports

== Bibliography ==
- Ashford, Norman J., Saleh Mumayiz, and Paul H. Wright. (2011) Airport engineering: planning, design, and development of 21st century airports (John Wiley & Sons, 2011).
- Bluffield, Robert. (2009). Imperial Airways – The Birth of the British Airline Industry 1914–1940 (Ian Allan) ISBN 978-1-906537-07-4
- Breidenbach, Philipp (2020). "Ready for take-off? The economic effects of regional airport expansions in Germany". Regional Studies. 54 (8): 1084–1097. Bibcode:2020RegSt..54.1084B. doi:10.1080/00343404.2019.1659948. hdl:10419/225046.
- Burghouwt, Guillaume. (2012) Airline network development in Europe and its implications for airport planning (Ashgate, 2012).
- Gillen, David (2011). "The evolution of airport ownership and governance". Journal of Air Transport Management. 17: 3–13. doi:10.1016/j.jairtraman.2010.10.003.
- Gordon, Alastair. (2008) Naked Airport: A Cultural History of the World's Most Revolutionary Structure (University of Chicago Press, 2008).
- Halpern, Nigel, and Anne Graham. (2013) Airport marketing (Routledge, 2013).
- Horonjeff, Robert, Francis X. McKelvey, William J. Sproule, and Seth B. Young. (2010) Planning and Design of Airports 5th ed. (McGraw-Hill, 2010).
- Hubregtse, Menno. (2020) Wayfinding, Consumption, and Air Terminal Design (Routledge, 2020).
- Nakamura, H.; Managi, S. (2020). "Airport risk of importation and exportation of the COVID-19 pandemic". Transport Policy. 96: 40–47. doi:10.1016/j.tranpol.2020.06.018. PMC 7328638. PMID 32834679.
- Pearman, Hugh. (2004) Airports: A Century of Architecture (Harry N. Abrams, 2004).
- Salter, Mark. 2008. Politics at the Airport (University of Minnesota Press). This book brings together leading scholars to examine how airports both shape and are shaped by current political, social, and economic conditions.
- Sheard, Nicholas. (2019) "Airport size and urban growth." Economica 86.342 (2019): 300–335; In USA, airport size has a positive effect on local employment, with an elasticity of 0.04.
- Wandelt, Sebastian; Sun, Xiaoqian; Zhang, Jun (2019). "Evolution of domestic airport networks: A review and comparative analysis" (PDF). Transportmetrica B: Transport Dynamics. 7: 1–17. doi:10.1080/21680566.2017.1301274. S2CID 52970361. Archived from the original (PDF) on October 9, 2022.
