= Airport and Airway Development Act of 1970 =

United States federal law

- Long title: An Act to provide for the expansion and improvement of the Nation's airport and airway system, for the imposition of airport and airway user charges, and for other purposes.
- Acronyms (colloquial): AADA
- Nicknames: Aviation Facilities Expansion Act, 1969
- Enacted by: the 91st United States Congress
- Effective: July 1, 1970

Citations
- Public law: Pub. L. 91–258
- Statutes at Large: 84 Stat. 219

Legislative history
- Introduced in the House as H.R. 14465 by Harley Orrin Staggers (D–WV) on October 27, 1969; Committee consideration by House Interstate and Foreign Commerce, Senate Commerce; Passed the House on November 6, 1969 (337-6); Passed the Senate on February 26, 1970 (77-0); Reported by the joint conference committee on May 12, 1970; agreed to by the Senate on May 12, 1970 (Agreed) and by the House on May 13, 1970 (362-3); Signed into law by President Richard Nixon on May 21, 1970

The Airport and Airway Development Act of 1970 (Pub.L. 91-258) was a United States federal law passed during the 91st Congress, and signed into law by President Richard Nixon in conjunction with the Airport and Airway Revenue Act on May 21, 1970. The act was meant to fill funding gaps in the airport and airway system, which had become inadequate due to the rapid growth of aviation. The legislation was estimated to generate greater than $11 billion in funds,

Together, the two acts created and planned funding for the Airport and Airway Trust Fund (Airport Trust Fund), which was initiated on July 1, 1970. The new Airport Trust Fund was modeled on the federal Highway Trust Fund, and would be fulfilled by new aviation-related excise taxes. These new taxes, including a tax on aviation fuels, a tax placed on tickets sold to passengers on domestic and international flights, a tax on waybills, and a new tax on aircraft registration, were expected to provide the anticipated $11 billion trust fund. These taxes would feed into the Airport Trust Fund in order to pay for airport development, as well as "acquiring, establishing, and improving air navigational facilities." The fund was authorized to pay for these improvements using $280-million-a-year grants over a five-year period.

It is believed that this user fee system would be advantageous compared to a flat tax, because it provided a predictable level of funding, allowed for the trust to plan far ahead, and assured fees meant for aviation related improvements would not be divided amongst unrelated fields.

Six years after the act became law, the Act was augmented by the Airport and Airway Development Act Amendments of 1976. The 1976 legislation was signed into law by President Gerald Ford in order to "make possible the continuing modernization of our airways, airports, and related facilities in communities throughout the 50 States." Ford stated these amendments would combat inflation and referred to the system as creating a "'pay-as-you-fly' program".

== See also ==
Airport Improvement Program
Federal Airport Act of 1946
List of Class B airports in the United States
List of Class C airports in the United States
