= Airport and Airway Trust Fund =

Aviation fund in the United States

The Airport and Airway Trust Fund (AATF) provides funding for the federal commitment to the aviation system of the United States through several aviation-related excise taxes. It was established on the books of the United States Department of the Treasury in 1971. The existence of an accumulated surplus in the fund has led some to question whether users of the aviation system are receiving their fair share of government spending given the aviation excise taxes they pay.

== Criticism ==
=== Funding structure ===
The AATF's funding structure has been criticized for the 7.5% passenger ticket tax which taxes passengers rather than planes. Under this funding structure those flying private contribute less to fund the FAA than those flying commercial.

== See also ==
- Airport and Airway Development Act of 1970
