= Independent Party =

Independent Party may refer to:

- Independent Party (Argentina)
- Independent Party (Burma)
- Independent Party (Denmark)
- Independent Party (Greece)
- The Independent Party in Kenya
- Independent Party (Laos)
- Independent Party (South Africa)
- Independent Party (Uruguay)
- Swatantra Party (Independence Party), India (1959–1974)
- Sikkim Swatantra Dal (Sikkim Independence Party), Sikkim, India (1958–1975)

== United States ==
- American Independent Party
- No Labels Party of Arizona
- Greenback Party, originally known as the Independent Party, U.S.
- Independent Party of Connecticut
- Independent Party of Delaware
- Independent Party of Florida
- Independent Party of Louisiana
- Independent Party of Oregon
- United Independent Party (Massachusetts)

== See also ==
- Independent Democratic Party (disambiguation)
- Independent Labour Party (disambiguation)
- Independent Liberal Party (disambiguation)
- Independent National Party (disambiguation)
- Independent People's Party (disambiguation)
- Independent Republican Party (disambiguation)
- Independent Socialist Party (disambiguation)
- Independent Group (disambiguation)
- Independent politician, an individual politician not affiliated with any political party
