= 2026 United States House of Representatives elections in Arizona =

- November 3, 2026

All 9 Arizona seats to the United States House of Representatives
- Turnout: 56.13%
- Reporting: 99.1% as of Nov 10 at 7:28 AM MST
	Majority party	Minority party
Party	Democratic	Republican
Last election	3	6
Seats before	3	6
Seats after	5	4
Seat change	▲2	▼2
Popular vote	1,383,445	1,109,338
Percentage	54.53%	43.72%
Swing	▲6.86%	▼7.94%

Democratic hold Democratic gain
Republican hold
Democratic:
50–60%
60–70%
70–80%
80–90%
Republican:
40–50%
50–60%
60–70%
70–80%

The 2026 United States House of Representatives elections in Arizona were held on November 3, 2026, to elect nine U.S. representatives from the state of Arizona, one from each of the state's congressional districts. The elections coincided with other elections to the House of Representatives, elections to the United States Senate, and various state and local elections. The primary elections took place on July 21, 2026.

== District 1 ==
2026 Arizona's 1st congressional district election
- Reporting: 99% as of Nov 10 at 7:28 AM MST
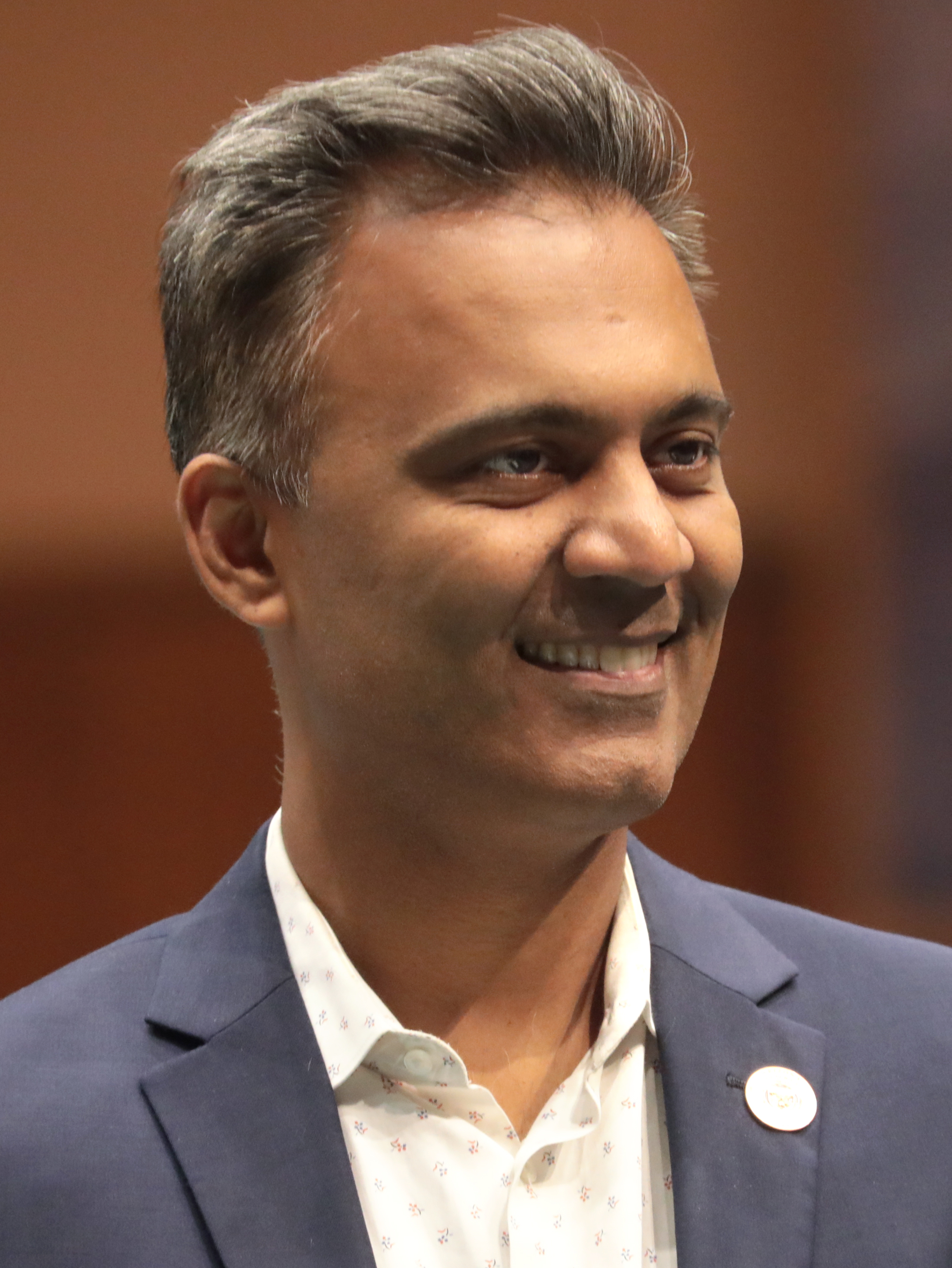

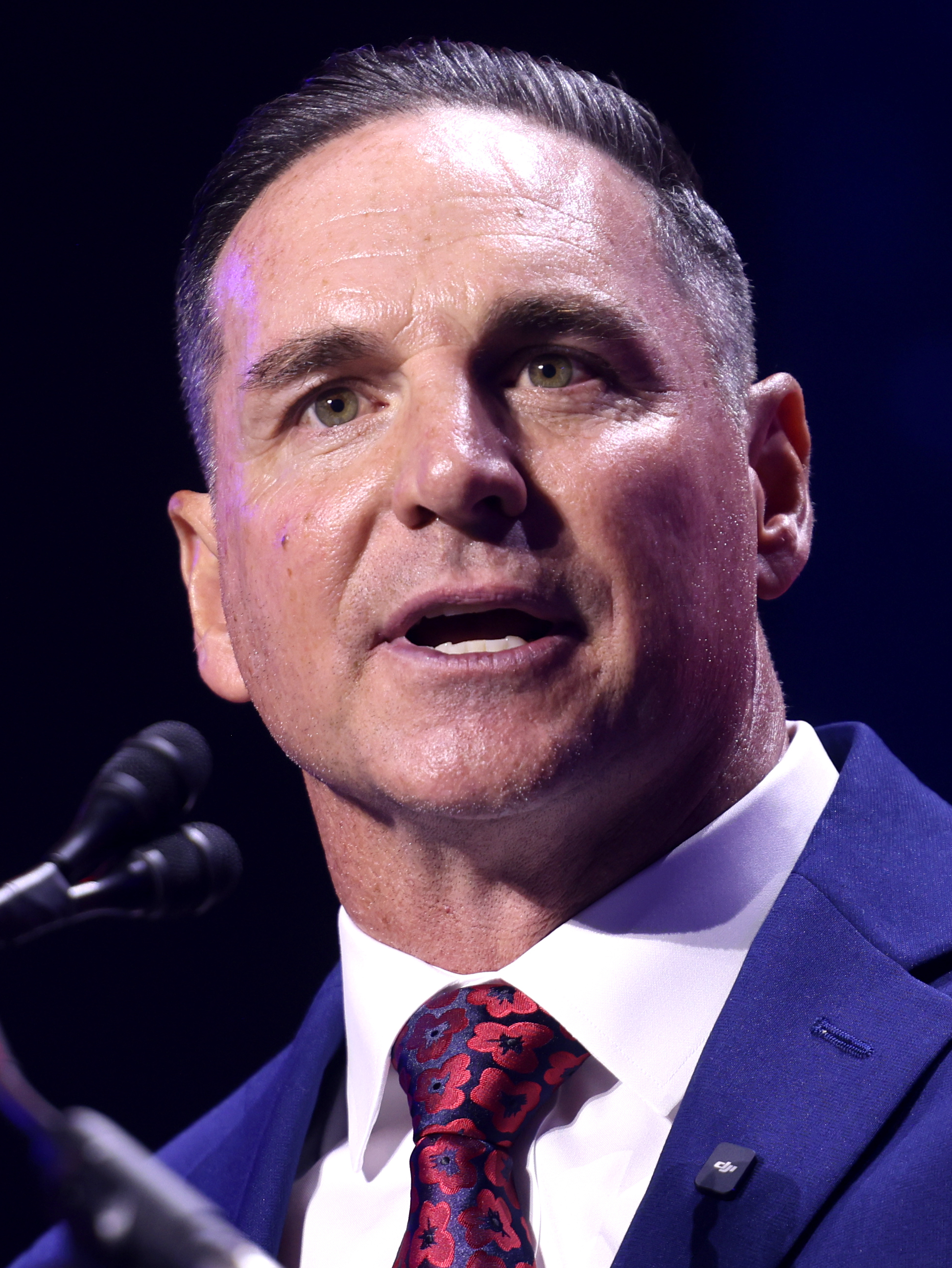
Nominee	Amish Shah	Jay Feely
Party	Democratic	Republican
Popular vote	184,770	160,408
Percentage	52.4%	45.5%
- Shah: 40–50% 50–60% 60–70% 70–80% 80–90% Feely: 40–50% 50–60% 60–70% 70–80% >90% No votes
U.S. Representative before election
David Schweikert
Republican
Elected U.S. Representative
Amish Shah
Democratic

The 1st district is based in the northeastern Phoenix suburbs, including Scottsdale. The incumbent is Republican David Schweikert, who was reelected with 51.9% of the vote in 2024. Schweikert initially ran for reelection, but withdrew from the race in September 2025 to run for governor.

=== Republican primary ===
==== Nominee ====
- Jay Feely, CBS Sports analyst and former Arizona Cardinals football player (previously ran in the 5th district)

==== Eliminated in primary ====
- Joseph Chaplik, former state representative from the 3rd district (2021–2026)
- John Trobough, businessman

==== Withdrawn ====
- Jason Duey, combat veteran and former federal prosecutor
- David Schweikert, incumbent U.S. representative (ran for governor)
- Gina Swoboda, former chair of the Arizona Republican Party (2024–2026) (ran for secretary of state)

==== Declined ====
- Shawnna Bolick, state senator from the 2nd district (2023–present) and candidate for secretary of state of Arizona in 2022 (running for reelection)
- Thomas Galvin, chair of the Maricopa County Board of Supervisors from the 2nd district
- Alexander Kolodin, state representative from the 3rd district (2023–present) (running for secretary of state, endorsed Chaplik)
- Elijah Norton, former treasurer of the Arizona Republican Party and candidate for this district in 2022 (running for state treasurer)
- Danica Patrick, former professional racing driver (endorsed Feely)
- Michelle Ugenti-Rita, former state senator from the 23rd district (2019–2023), candidate for secretary of state of Arizona in 2022, and candidate for Maricopa County Board of Supervisors in 2024 (endorsed Chaplik)
- Jim Waring, Phoenix city councilor from the 2nd district (2011–present)
- Carine Werner, state senator from the 4th district (2025–present)

==== Endorsements ====
Joseph Chaplik

U.S. representatives

- Barry Goldwater Jr., former CA-20 (1969–1983) (co-endorsement with Feely)
Jay Feely

Executive branch officials

- Robert F. Kennedy Jr., secretary of health and human services (2025–present)
- Donald Trump, president of the United States (2017–2021, 2025–present) (co-endorsement with Swoboda)

U.S. representatives

- Juan Ciscomani, AZ-06 (2023–present)
- Tom Emmer, House majority whip (2023–present) from MN-06 (2015–present)
- Barry Goldwater Jr., former CA-20 (1969–1983) (co-endorsement with Chaplik)
- Richard Hudson, NC-09 (2013–present)
- Mike Johnson, speaker of the House (2023–present) from LA-04 (2017–present)
- Jim Jordan, OH-04 (2007–present)
- Anna Paulina Luna, FL-13 (2023–present)
- Lisa McClain, MI-09 (2021–present)
- Steve Scalise, House majority leader (2023–present) from LA-01 (2008–present)
- John Shadegg, former AZ-03 (1995–2011)

Individuals

- Danica Patrick, former NASCAR driver

Organizations

- NRCC MAGA Majority
Gina Swoboda (withdrawn)

Executive branch officials

- Donald Trump, president of the United States (2017–2021, 2025–present) (co-endorsement with Feely)

==== Fundraising ====
Italics indicate a withdrawn candidate.

Campaign finance reports as of July 1, 2026
Candidate	Raised	Spent	Cash on hand
Joseph Chaplik (R)	$604,971 (Note: $300,000 was self funded)	$475,451	$129,520
Jay Feely (R)	$2,525,520	$1,731,045	$794,475
John Trobough (R)	$1,158,469 (Note: $1,007,784 was self funded)	$1,073,571	$84,898
Source: Federal Election Commission

==== Polling ====
Poll source	Date(s) administered	Sample size (Note: Key: A – all adults RV – registered voters LV – likely voters V – unclear)	Margin of error	Joseph Chaplik	Jay Feely	John Trobough	Undecided
NextGenP (R)	June 16–17, 2026	695	± 3.9%	23%	25%	6%	46%
Advanced Targeting Research (Note: Poll sponsored by Chaplik's campaign)	May 12–13, 2026	400 (LV)	–	29%	9%	5%	57%
NextGenP (R)	April 13–16, 2026	409 (LV)	± 4.8%	24%	15%	6%	54%

==== Debate ====
2026 Arizona's 1st congressional district Republican primary debate
No.	Date	Host	Moderator	Link	Republican	Republican	Republican
Key: P Participant A Absent N Not invited I Invited W Withdrawn							
Key: P Participant A Absent N Not invited I Invited W Withdrawn					Joseph Chaplik	Thomas "Jay" Feely IV	John Trobough
1	May 5, 2026	Arizona PBS	Ted Simons	PBS	A	P	P
2	June 24, 2026	Arizona Citizens Clean Elections Commission; Arizona Media Association	Steve Goldstein; Danielle Lerner	YouTube	P	P	P

==== Results ====
Republican primary results by precinct: Feely: 30–40%; 40–50%; 50–60%; 60–70%; 90–100%; Chaplik: 30–40%; 40–50%; 50–60%; Tie: 40–50%

Republican primary results
Party	Candidate	Votes	%
Republican	Jay Feely	43,709	49.8
Republican	Joseph Chaplik	31,347	35.7
Republican	John Trobough	12,718	14.5
Total votes		87,774	100.0

=== Democratic primary ===
==== Nominee ====
- Amish Shah, former state representative from the 5th district (2019–2024) and nominee for this district in 2024

==== Eliminated in primary ====
- Marlene Galán-Woods, former KSAZ-TV news anchor, widow of former Republican Arizona Attorney General Grant Woods, and candidate for this district in 2024
- Rick McCartney, media firm owner
- Jonathan Treble, businessman

==== Withdrawn ====
- Brian del Vecchio, administrative law judge at the Arizona Office of Administrative Hearings
- Mark Robert Gordon, attorney and Democratic National Committee member
- Daniel Lucio, system engineer
- Victor Weintraub, retired businessman

==== Declined ====
- James McCain, intelligence officer in the 158th Infantry Regiment and son of former Republican U.S. Senator John McCain
- Conor O'Callaghan, global trading executive and candidate for this district in 2024

==== Endorsements ====
Marlene Galán-Woods

Executive branch officials

- Janet Napolitano, former secretary of homeland security (2009–2013) and governor of Arizona (2003-2009)
- Tom Udall, former U.S. ambassador to New Zealand (2021–2025) and Samoa (2022–2025) and U.S. senator from New Mexico (2009–2021)

U.S. senators

- Mark Kelly, Arizona (2020–present)

U.S. representatives

- Ron Barber, former AZ-02 (2012–2015)
- Nikki Budzinski, IL-13 (2023–present)
- Gil Cisneros, CA-31 (2019–2021, 2025–present)
- Sam Coppersmith, former AZ-01 (1993–1995) and former chair of the Arizona Democratic Party (1995–1997)
- Suzan DelBene, WA-01 (2012–present)
- Lois Frankel, FL-22 (2013–present)
- Laura Friedman, CA-30 (2025–present)
- Annie Kuster, former NH-02 (2013–2025)
- Andrea Salinas, OR-06 (2023–present)
- Linda Sánchez, CA-38 (2003–present)

Statewide officials

- Kris Mayes, attorney general of Arizona (2023–present)

Labor unions

- National Education Association

Organizations

- Congressional Hispanic Caucus BOLD PAC
- DCCC Red to Blue
- Democratic Majority for Israel
- Elect Democratic Women
- EMILYs List
- End Citizens United
- Latino Victory Fund
- Planned Parenthood Action Fund
- PODER PAC
Amish Shah

U.S. representatives

- Raja Krishnamoorthi, IL-08 (2017–present)
- Suhas Subramanyam, VA-10 (2025–present)

Organizations

- 314 Action
- AAPI Victory Fund
- Asian American Action Fund
- ASPIRE PAC
- Center for Freethought Equality
- Democrats for Education Reform
Jonathan Treble

U.S. representatives

- Tom O'Halleran, former AZ-01 (2017–2023)
- Eric Sorensen, IL-17 (2023–present)

Organizations

- Joint Action Committee for Political Affairs (previously endorsed Gordon)
Mark Robert Gordon (withdrawn)

Organizations

- Joint Action Committee for Political Affairs (later endorsed Treble)

==== Fundraising ====
Italics indicate a withdrawn candidate.

Campaign finance reports as of July 1, 2026
Candidate	Raised	Spent	Cash on hand
Marlene Galán-Woods (D)	$2,185,747	$1,646,653	$539,093
Mark Robert Gordon (D)	$299,117	$236,667	$61,924
Rick McCartney (D)	$1,277,575 (Note: $808,698 was self funded)	$1,025,936	$251,640
Amish Shah (D)	$1,830,193 (Note: $430,655 was self funded)	$1,520,251	$401,745
Jonathan Treble (D)	$3,979,424 (Note: $1,018,252 was self funded)	$3,320,814	$658,610
Source: Federal Election Commission

==== Polling ====
Poll source	Date(s) administered	Sample size	Margin of error	Marlene Galán-Woods	Mark Robert Gordon	Rick McCartney	Amish Shah	Jonathan Treble	Other	Undecided
HighGround, Inc.	February 21–23, 2026	400 (LV)	± 4.9%	11%	1.8%	1.5%	32.5%	1.5%	2.7% (Note: "Refused" with 1.5%; "Other" with 1.2%)	49%

==== Debate ====
2026 Arizona's 1st congressional district Democratic primary debate
No.	Date	Host	Moderator	Link	Democratic	Democratic	Democratic	Democratic
Key: P Participant A Absent N Not invited I Invited W Withdrawn								
Key: P Participant A Absent N Not invited I Invited W Withdrawn					Amish Shah	Jonathan Treble	Marlene Galán-Woods	Rick McCartney
1	June 23, 2026	Clean Elections Commission; Arizona Media Association	Steve Goldstein; Danielle Lerner	YouTube	P	P	P	P

==== Results ====
Democratic primary results by precinct: Shah: 30–40%; 40–50%; 50–60%; 60–70%; Galán-Woods: 30–40%; 40–50%; 50–60%; Treble: 30–40%; McCartney: 40–50%; Tie: 30–40%; No votes

Democratic primary results
Party	Candidate	Votes	%
Democratic	Amish Shah	29,002	39.4
Democratic	Marlene Galán-Woods	25,267	34.4
Democratic	Jonathan Treble	13,006	17.7
Democratic	Rick McCartney	6,248	8.5
Total votes		73,523	100.0

=== Libertarian primary ===
==== Nominee ====
- Monica Alponte, retired business writer

==== Endorsements ====
Monica Alponte

Organizations

- Anti-Zionist America PAC

==== Fundraising ====
Campaign finance reports as of July 1, 2026
Candidate	Raised	Spent	Cash on hand
Monica Alponte (L)	$8,941	$8,307	$634
Source: Federal Election Commission

==== Results ====
Libertarian primary results
Party	Candidate	Votes	%
Libertarian	Monica Alponte	289	100.0
Total votes		289	100.0

=== Green primary ===
==== Withdrawn ====
- David Redkey, educator (running in the 3rd district)

=== No Labels primary ===
==== Withdrawn ====
- Christopher Ajluni

==== Fundraising ====
Campaign finance reports as of July 1, 2026
Candidate	Raised	Spent	Cash on hand
Christopher Aljuni (NL)	$3,513	$3,513	$0
Source: Federal Election Commission

=== General election ===
==== Predictions ====
Source	Ranking	As of
Decision Desk HQ	Likely D (flip)	November 3, 2026
The Cook Political Report	Lean D (flip)	September 25, 2026
Inside Elections	Tilt D (flip)	October 15, 2026
Sabato's Crystal Ball	Lean D (flip)	October 20, 2026
The Economist (Note: This forecast uses the terms "Likely" and "Very Likely" the same way the other forecasts use the terms "Lean" and "Likely". To avoid confusion, and for the purposes of equivalency, the terms "Likely" and "Very Likely" will be changed to "Lean" and "Likely" for the purposes of this page. As well, "tossup" is labeled "uncertain", but for the purposes of this page it will be labelled "tossup".)	Likely D (flip)	May 7, 2026
Silver Bulletin	Likely D (flip)	October 27, 2026

==== Post-primary endorsements ====
Jay Feely (R)

U.S. senators

- Kyrsten Sinema, former Arizona (2019–2025) (Independent; elected as a Democrat)

Statewide officials

- Doug Ducey, former governor of Arizona (2015–2023)

Local officials

- Rachel Mitchell, Maricopa County attorney (2022–present)

Organizations

- NRA Political Victory Fund
- U.S. Chamber of Commerce
Amish Shah (D)

Labor unions

- Arizona AFL-CIO

Organizations

- DCCC Red to Blue
- Human Rights Campaign PAC
- J Street
- Jewish Democratic Council of America
- League of Conservation Voters
- Reproductive Freedom for All

==== Fundraising ====
Campaign finance reports as of October 14, 2026
Candidate	Raised	Spent	Cash on hand
Jay Feely (R)	$3,799,654	$3,616,890	$182,764
Amish Shah (D)	$5,654,454	$5,540,210	$206,045
Monica Alponte (L)	$9,453	$8,699	$754
Source: Federal Election Commission

==== Polling ====
Poll source	Date(s) administered	Sample size	Margin of error	Jay Feely (R)	Amish Shah (D)	Undecided
FirstStrategic Communications and Public Affairs	October 1, 2026	400 (LV)	± 5.4%	42%	44%	14%

Hypothetical polling

Jay Feely vs. generic Democrat

Poll source	Date(s) administered	Sample size	Margin of error	Jay Feely (R)	Generic Democrat	Undecided
Grayhouse (R)	November 15–17, 2025	500 (LV)	± 4.4%	42%	42%	16%

Gina Swoboda vs. generic Democrat

Poll source	Date(s) administered	Sample size	Margin of error	Gina Swoboda (R)	Generic Democrat	Undecided
Grayhouse (R)	November 15–17, 2025	500 (LV)	± 4.4%	40%	43%	17%

Generic Republican vs. generic Democrat

Poll source	Date(s) administered	Sample size	Margin of error	Generic Republican	Generic Democrat	Undecided
Clarity Campaign Labs (D) (Note: Poll sponsored by Elect Democratic Women and CHC BOLD PAC)	November 1–5, 2025	677 (RV)	± 2.9%	46%	45%	9%

==== Results ====
2026 Arizona's 1st congressional district election
Party	Candidate	Votes	%	±%
Republican	Jay Feely			
Democratic	Amish Shah			
Libertarian	Monica Alponte			
Total votes				

== District 2 ==
2026 Arizona's 2nd congressional district election
- Reporting: 99% as of Nov 10 at 7:28 AM MST
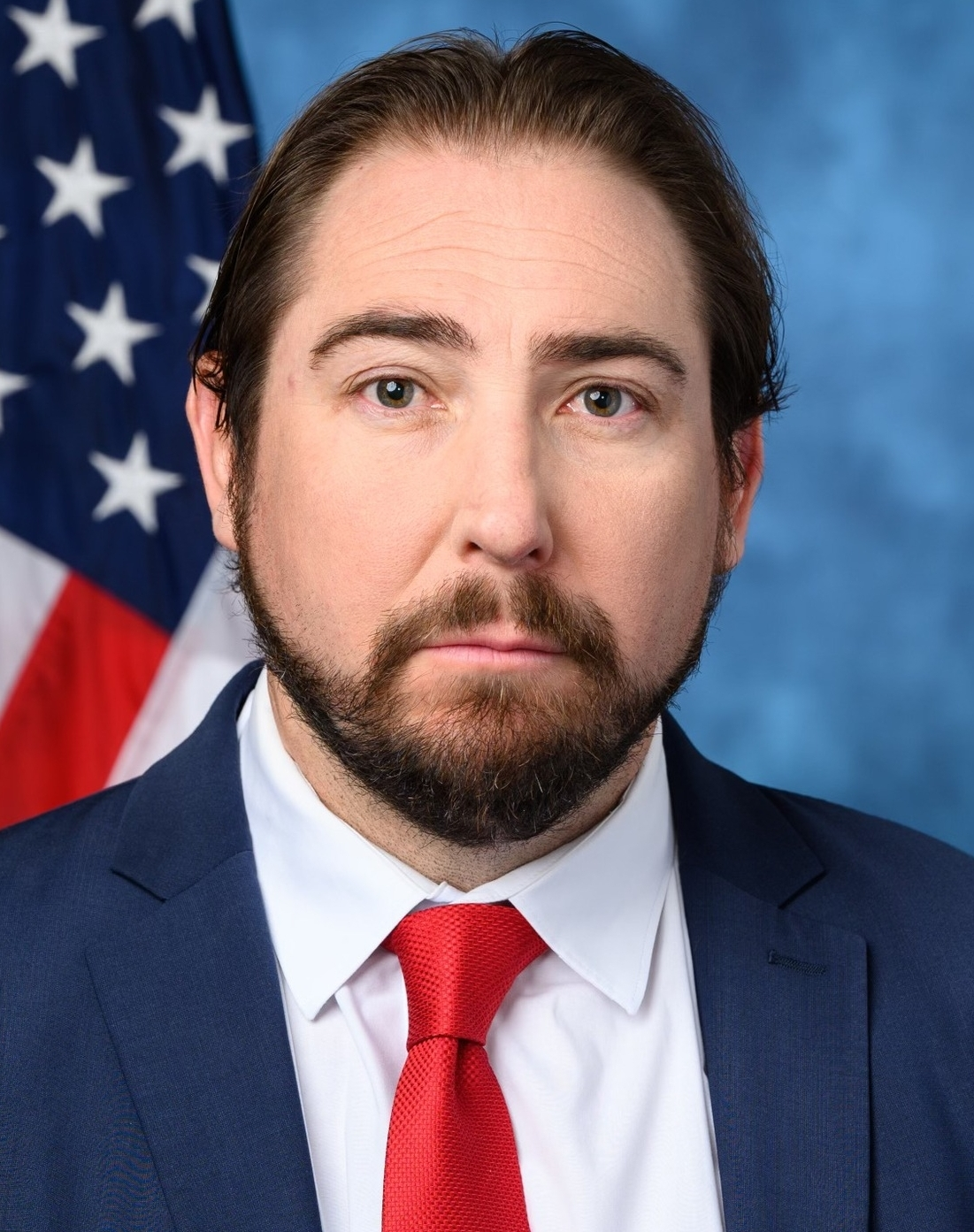

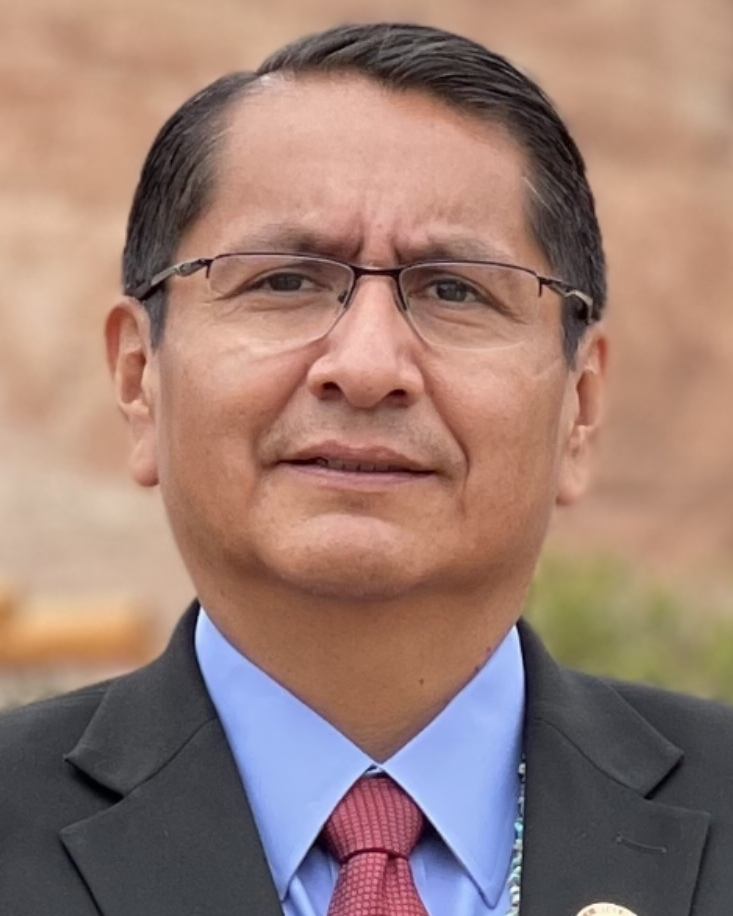
Nominee	Eli Crane	Jonathan Nez
Party	Republican	Democratic
Popular vote	163,286	159,763
Percentage	49.6%	48.5%
- Crane: 40–50% 50–60% 60–70% 70–80% 80–90% >90% Nez: 40–50% 50–60% 60–70% 70–80% 80–90% >90% Tie: 50% No votes
U.S. Representative before election
Eli Crane
Republican
Elected U.S. Representative
Eli Crane
Republican

The 2nd district encompasses much of northeastern Arizona, including Prescott, Flagstaff, and much of the Navajo Nation. The incumbent is Republican Eli Crane, who was reelected with 54.5% of the vote in 2024.

=== Republican primary ===
==== Nominee ====
- Eli Crane, incumbent U.S. representative

==== Endorsements ====
Eli Crane

Executive branch officials

- Donald Trump, 45th and 47th president of the United States (2017–2021, 2025–present)

Organizations

- Club for Growth PAC
- Freedom Caucus Fund
- Turning Point Action

==== Fundraising ====
Campaign finance reports as of July 1, 2026
Candidate	Raised	Spent	Cash on hand
Eli Crane (R)	$9,481,428	$6,957,053	$2,841,745
Source: Federal Election Commission

==== Results ====
Republican primary results
Party	Candidate	Votes	%
Republican	Eli Crane (incumbent)	89,205	100.0
Total votes		89,205	100.0

=== Democratic primary ===
==== Nominee ====
- Jonathan Nez, former president of the Navajo Nation (2019–2023) and nominee for this district in 2024

==== Withdrawn ====
- David Alexander, retired national guardsman and write-in candidate for this district in 2024
- Eric Descheenie, former state representative from the 7th district (2017–2019)

==== Endorsements ====
Jonathan Nez

Executive branch officials

- Deb Haaland, former secretary of the interior (2021–2025)

U.S. senators

- Ruben Gallego, Arizona (2025–present)
- Mark Kelly, Arizona (2020–present)

U.S. representatives

- Yassamin Ansari, AZ-03 (2025–present)
- Jason Crow, CO-06 (2019–present)
- Suzan DelBene, WA-01 (2012–present)
- Karan English, former AZ-06 (1993–1995)
- Ann Kirkpatrick, former AZ-02 (2019–2023), AZ-01 (2009–2011, 2013–2017)
- Teresa Leger Fernández, NM-03 (2021–present)
- Tom O'Halleran, former AZ-01 (2017–2023)
- Melanie Stansbury, NM-01 (2021–present)
- Greg Stanton, AZ-04 (2019–present)

Statewide officials

- Kris Mayes, attorney general of Arizona (2023–present)

County officials

- Ammon Barker, Coconino County attorney (2025–present)

Organizations

- DCCC Red to Blue
- Human Rights Campaign
- Jewish Democratic Council of America
- NewDem Action Fund

==== Fundraising ====
Campaign finance reports as of July 1, 2026
Candidate	Raised	Spent	Cash on hand
Eric Descheenie (D)	$4,063	$1,866	$2,197
Jonathan Nez (D)	$3,519,760	$1,674,073	$1,910,990
Source: Federal Election Commission

==== Results ====
Democratic primary results
Party	Candidate	Votes	%
Democratic	Jonathan Nez	65,118	100.0
Total votes		65,118	100.0

=== Libertarian primary ===
==== Nominee ====
- Curtis Goodwin

==== Eliminated in primary ====
- Alex Flores (write-in)

==== Results ====
Libertarian primary results
Party	Candidate	Votes	%
Libertarian	Curtis Goodwin	318	97.0
Libertarian	Alex Flores (write-in)	10	3.0
Total votes		328	100.0

=== General election ===
==== Predictions ====
Source	Ranking	As of
Decision Desk HQ	Lean R	November 3, 2026
The Cook Political Report	Lean R	October 23, 2026
Inside Elections	Lean R	October 29, 2026
Sabato's Crystal Ball	Lean R	October 27, 2026
The Economist	Tossup	October 24, 2026
Silver Bulletin	Likely R	August 20, 2026

==== Post-primary endorsements ====
Eli Crane (R)

Organizations

- NRA Political Victory Fund
Jonathan Nez (D)

Labor unions

- Arizona AFL-CIO

Organizations

- J Street

==== Fundraising ====
Campaign finance reports as of October 14, 2026
Candidate	Raised	Spent	Cash on hand
Eli Crane (R)	$11,904,946	$10,873,254	$1,349,063
Jonathan Nez (D)	$5,805,341	$5,364,572	$506,072
Source: Federal Election Commission

==== Polling ====
Poll source	Date(s) administered	Sample size (Note: Key: A – all adults RV – registered voters LV – likely voters V – unclear)	Margin of error	Eli Crane (R)	Jonathan Nez (D)	Other	Undecided
Emerson College (Note: Poll sponsored by Poll Vault)	October 12–14, 2026	345 (LV)	–	48%	50%	–	2%
GBAO (D) (Note: Poll sponsored by Nez's campaign)	August 21–24, 2026	500 (LV)	± 4.4%	46%	44%	–	10%
Peak Insights (R) (Note: Poll sponsored by Crane's campaign)	August 17–20, 2026	400 (LV)	± 5.0%	53%	42%	–	5%
GBAO (D)	June 11–15, 2026	500 (LV)	± 4.4%	44%	41%	7% (Note: Curtis Goodwin (L) with 7%)	9%

==== Results ====
2026 Arizona's 2nd congressional district election
Party	Candidate	Votes	%	±%
Republican	Eli Crane (incumbent)			
Democratic	Jonathan Nez			
Libertarian	Curtis Goodwin			
Total votes				

== District 3 ==
2026 Arizona's 3rd congressional district election
- Reporting: 99% as of Nov 10 at 7:28 AM MST
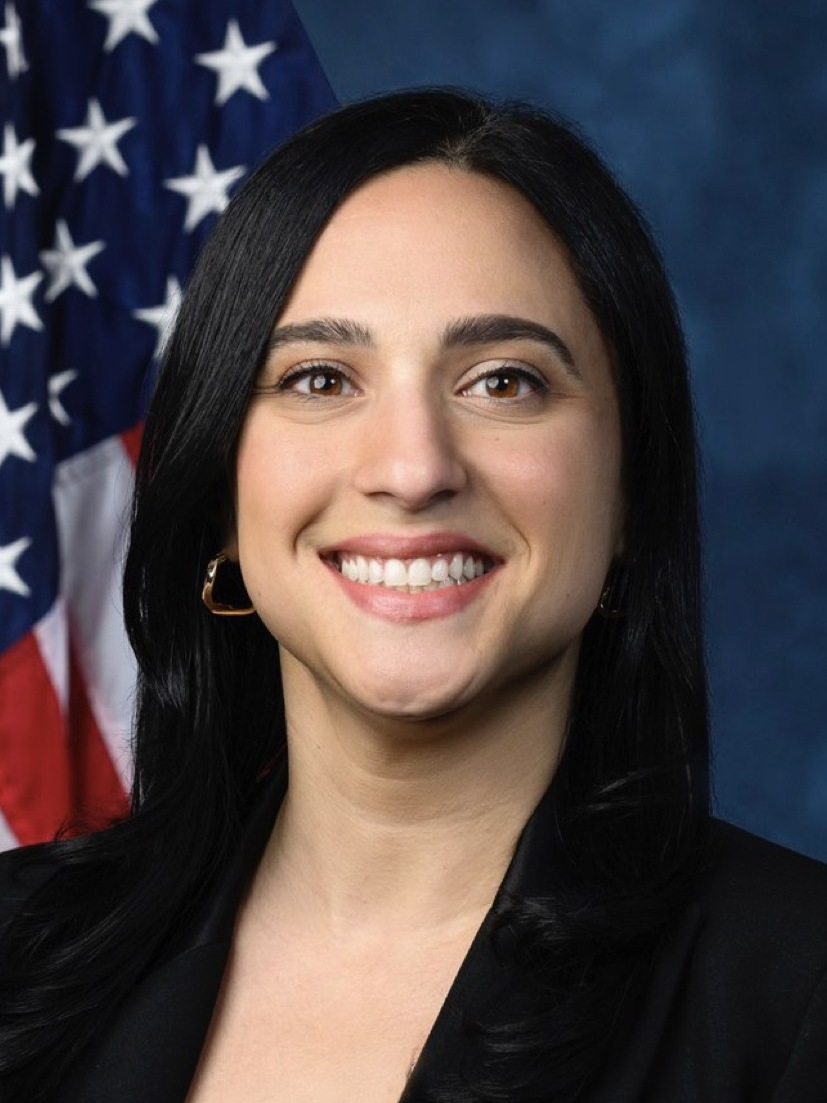

Nominee	Yassamin Ansari	Alan Aversa	David Redkey
Party	Democratic	No Labels	Green
Popular vote	129,736	9,010	7,719
Percentage	87.4%	6.1%	5.2%
- Ansari: 80–90%
U.S. Representative before election
Yassamin Ansari
Democratic
Elected U.S. Representative
Yassamin Ansari
Democratic

The 3rd district is majority-Latino and is based in downtown and western Phoenix. The incumbent is Democrat Yassamin Ansari, who was elected with 70.9% of the vote in 2024.

=== Democratic primary ===
==== Nominee ====
- Yassamin Ansari, incumbent U.S. representative

==== Endorsements ====
Yassamin Ansari

Labor unions

- National Education Association

Organizations

- AAPI Victory Fund
- Center for Freethought Equality
- End Citizens United
- Giffords
- Jewish Democratic Council of America
- Planned Parenthood Action Fund

==== Fundraising ====
Campaign finance reports as of July 1, 2026
Candidate	Raised	Spent	Cash on hand
Yassamin Ansari (D)	$1,435,713	$896,441	$549,683
Source: Federal Election Commission

==== Results ====
Democratic primary results
Party	Candidate	Votes	%
Democratic	Yassamin Ansari (incumbent)	37,553	100.0
Total votes		37,553	100.0

=== Republican primary ===
==== Nominee ====
- Jacob Parkman (write-in in general election ballot)

==== Did not qualify ====
- Nicholas Glenn, technician (write-in)

==== Results ====
Republican primary results
Party	Candidate	Votes	%
Republican	Nicholas Glenn (write-in)	437	100.0
Total votes		437	100.0

=== No Labels primary ===
==== Nominee ====
- Alan Aversa, educator

==== Results ====
No Labels primary results
Party	Candidate	Votes	%
No Labels	Alan Aversa	571	100.0
Total votes		571	100.0

=== Green primary ===
==== Nominee ====
- David Redkey, educator

==== Results ====
Green primary results
Party	Candidate	Votes	%
Green	David Redkey (write-in)	5	100.0
Total votes		5	100.0

=== General election ===
==== Predictions ====
Source	Ranking	As of
Decision Desk HQ	Safe D	July 14, 2026
The Cook Political Report	Solid D	June 30, 2025
Inside Elections	Solid D	June 30, 2025
Sabato's Crystal Ball	Safe D	July 10, 2025
The Economist	Safe D	May 6, 2026

==== Post-primary endorsements ====
Yassamin Ansari

Labor unions

- Arizona AFL-CIO

Organizations

- Reproductive Freedom for All
Declined to endorse

Political Parties

- Arizona Green Party (endorsed against Redkey)

==== Fundraising ====
Campaign finance reports as of September 30, 2026
Candidate	Raised	Spent	Cash on hand
Yassamin Ansari (D)	$1,626,664	$1,282,755	$354,320
Source: Federal Election Commission

==== Results ====
2026 Arizona's 3rd congressional district election
Party	Candidate	Votes	%	±%
Democratic	Yassamin Ansari (incumbent)			
Republican	Jacob Parkman			
No Labels	Alan Aversa			
Green	David Redkey			
Total votes				

== District 4 ==
2026 Arizona's 4th congressional district election
- Reporting: 99% as of Nov 10 at 7:28 AM MST
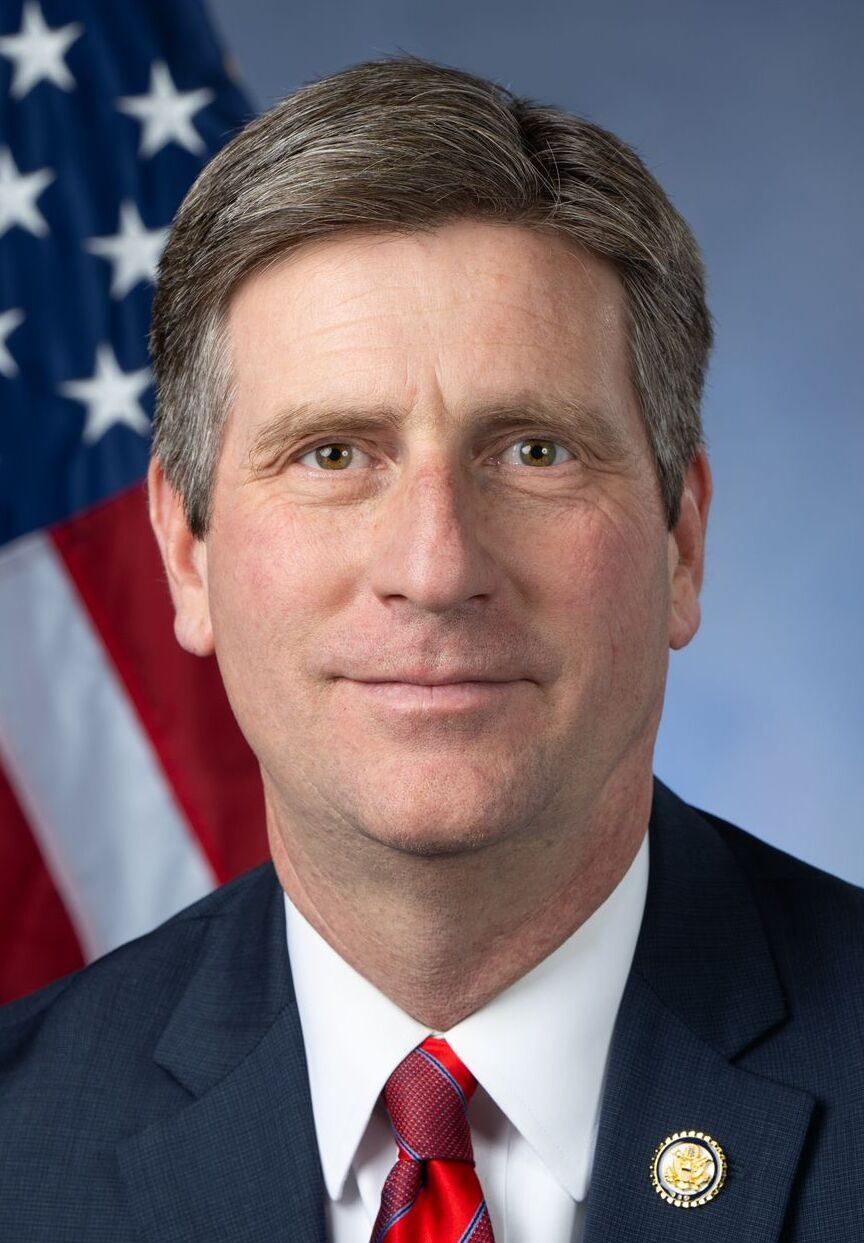

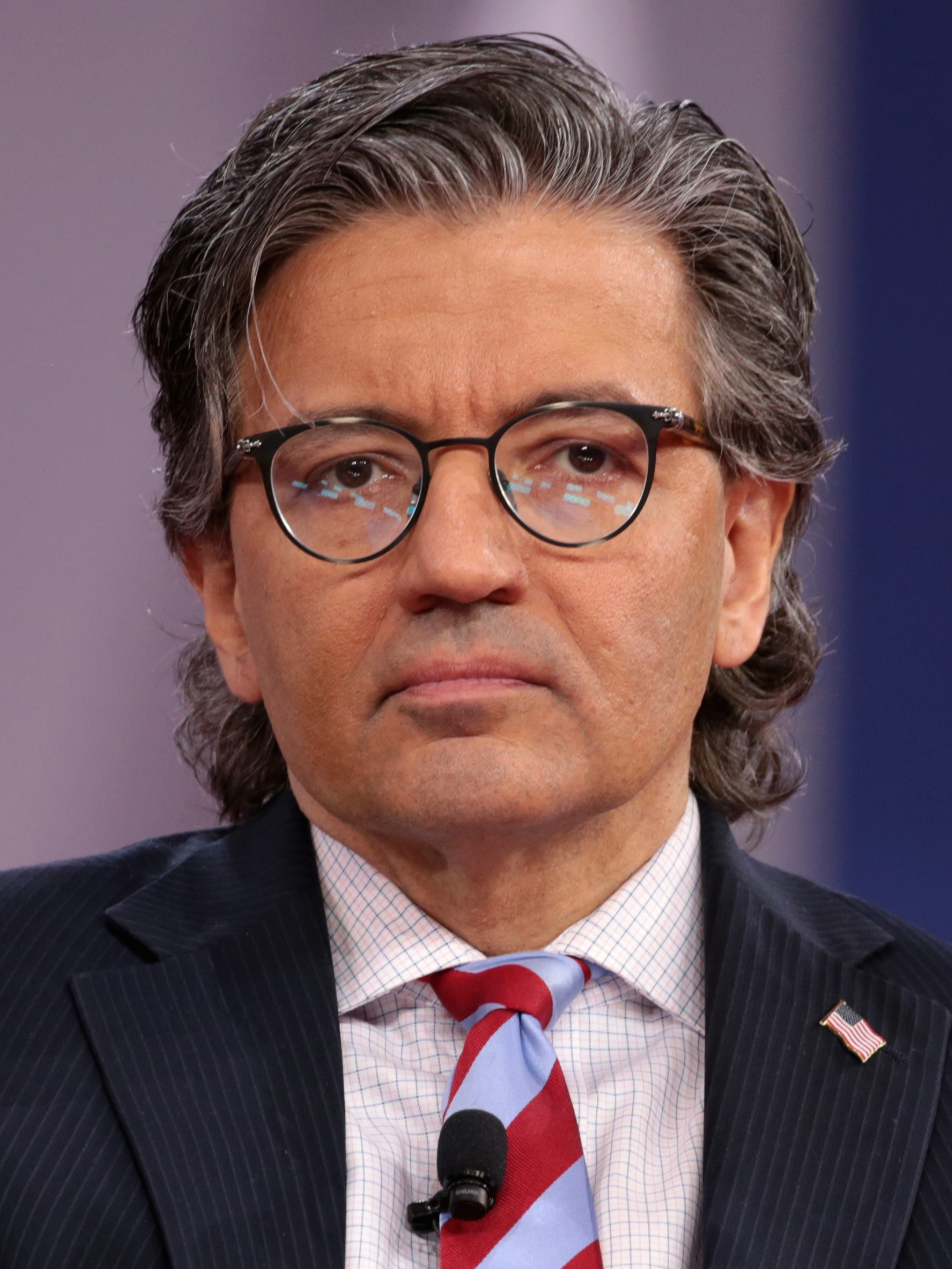
Nominee	Greg Stanton	Zuhdi Jasser
Party	Democratic	Republican
Popular vote	158,299	89,417
Percentage	62.4%	35.2%
- Stanton: 60–70%
U.S. Representative before election
Greg Stanton
Democratic
Elected U.S. Representative
Greg Stanton
Democratic

The 4th district encompasses much of Tempe, Mesa, and Chandler. The incumbent is Democrat Greg Stanton, who was reelected with 52.7% of the vote in 2024.

=== Democratic primary ===
==== Nominee ====
- Greg Stanton, incumbent U.S. representative

==== Eliminated in primary ====
- Kai Newkirk, progressive organizer

==== Endorsements ====
Greg Stanton

U.S. representatives

- Adelita Grijalva, AZ-07 (2025–present)

Labor unions

- National Education Association

Organizations

- AIPAC
- Democratic Majority for Israel
- Jewish Democratic Council of America
- Joint Action Committee for Political Affairs
- League of Conservation Voters
- Planned Parenthood Action Fund
- Population Connection
- Reproductive Freedom for All
Kai Newkirk

Individuals

- Nomiki Konst, journalist (campaign spokesperson)

Organizations

- Arizona College Democrats
- CAIR Action
- Our Revolution
- Progressive Democrats of America
- Track AIPAC
- University of Arizona College Democrats
- ~~Young Democrats of Arizona~~ (endorsement rescinded)
Declined to endorse

Organizations

- Phoenix-Metro Democratic Socialists of America

==== Fundraising ====
Campaign finance reports as of July 1, 2026
Candidate	Raised	Spent	Cash on hand
Kai Newkirk (D)	$151,143	$60,278	$90,865
Greg Stanton (D)	$2,117,114	$1,112,556	$2,020,289
Source: Federal Election Commission

==== Polling ====
Poll source	Date(s) administered	Sample size	Margin of error	Kai Newkirk	Greg Stanton	Undecided
Braun Research (D) (Note: Poll sponsored by A Fight Worth Having PAC, which opposes Stanton)	July 6–8, 2026	424 (LV)	± 4.9%	38%	46%	17%
FM3 Research (D) (Note: Poll sponsored by Stanton's campaign)	June 27–29, 2026	422 (RV)	± 4.9%	23%	56%	21%

==== Debates and forums ====
2026 Arizona's 4th congressional district Democratic primary debates and forums
No.	Date	Host	Moderator	Link	Democratic	Democratic
Key: P Participant A Absent N Not invited I Invited W Withdrawn						
Key: P Participant A Absent N Not invited I Invited W Withdrawn					Kai Newkirk	Greg Stanton
1	May 27, 2026	Arizona Citizens Clean Elections Commission; Arizona Media Association	Steve Goldstein	YouTube	P	A (Note: Stanton skipped the scheduled debate, which became a one-on-one discussion with Newkirk.)

==== Results ====
Democratic primary results by precinct Stanton: 50–60%; 60–70%; 70–80%; 80–90%; Newkirk: 50–60%; 60–70%; 70–80%; Tie No data

Democratic primary results
Party	Candidate	Votes	%
Democratic	Greg Stanton (incumbent)	35,551	62.3
Democratic	Kai Newkirk	21,544	37.7
Total votes		57,095	100.0

=== Republican primary ===
==== Nominee ====
- Zuhdi Jasser, physician and candidate for this district in 2024

==== Disqualified ====
- Jerone Davison, former running back for the Las Vegas Raiders, pastor and candidate for this district in 2022 and 2024

==== Withdrawn ====
- Bradley Honer, USAF veteran and graduate student

==== Endorsements ====
Zuhdi Jasser

Organizations

- Turning Point Action

==== Fundraising ====
Italics indicate a withdrawn candidate.

Campaign finance reports as of July 1, 2026
Candidate	Raised	Spent	Cash on hand
Jerone Davison (R)	$240,850	$239,678	$1,172
Zuhdi Jasser (R)	$564,641	$222,990	$341,651
Source: Federal Election Commission

==== Results ====
Republican primary results
Party	Candidate	Votes	%
Republican	Zuhdi Jasser	39,431	100.0
Total votes		39,431	100.0

=== No Labels primary ===
==== Nominee ====
- Tisha Benoit, healthcare professional

==== Eliminated in primary ====
- John Fillmore, former Republican state representative (2011–2013, 2019–2023)

==== Results ====
No Labels primary results
Party	Candidate	Votes	%
No Labels	Tisha Benoit	981	65.4
No Labels	John Fillmore	519	34.6
Total votes		1,500	100.0

=== General election ===
==== Predictions ====
Source	Ranking	As of
Decision Desk HQ	Safe D	September 10, 2026
The Cook Political Report	Solid D	June 30, 2025
Inside Elections	Solid D	June 30, 2025
Sabato's Crystal Ball	Safe D	July 10, 2025
The Economist	Safe D	May 6, 2026
Silver Bulletin	Solid D	August 20, 2026

==== Post-primary endorsements ====
Greg Stanton (D)

Labor unions

- Arizona AFL-CIO

==== Fundraising ====
Campaign finance reports as of September 30, 2026
Candidate	Raised	Spent	Cash on hand
Greg Stanton (D)	$2,603,086	$1,709,122	$1,909,695
Zudhi Jasser (R)	$732,912	$616,791	$116,121
Source: Federal Election Commission

==== Results ====
2026 Arizona's 4th congressional district election
Party	Candidate	Votes	%	±%
Democratic	Greg Stanton (incumbent)			
Republican	Zuhdi Jasser			
No Labels	Tisha Benoit			
Total votes				

== District 5 ==
2026 Arizona's 5th congressional district election
- Reporting: 99% as of Nov 10 at 7:28 AM MST
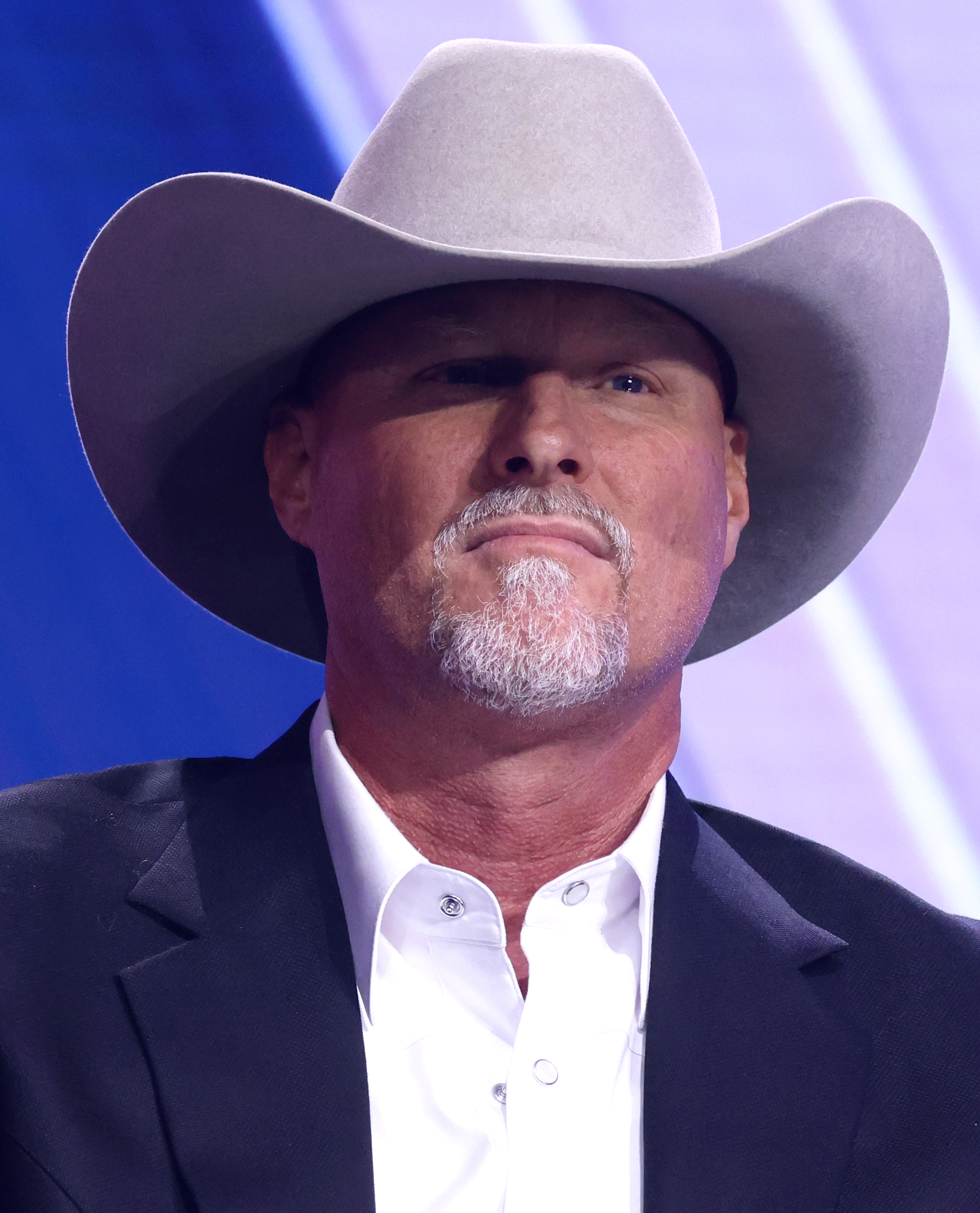
Nominee	Mark Lamb	Elizabeth Lee
Party	Republican	Democratic
Popular vote	167,205	156,223
Percentage	51.7%	48.3%
- Lamb: 50–60% 60–70% 70–80% 80-90% Lee: 50–60% 60–70% Tie: 50%
U.S. Representative before election
Andy Biggs
Republican
Elected U.S. Representative
Mark Lamb
Republican

The 5th district is based in the East Valley, including Gilbert and portions of Chandler and Mesa. The incumbent is Republican Andy Biggs, who was reelected with 60.4% of the vote in 2024. Biggs is retiring to run for governor in 2026.

=== Republican primary ===
==== Nominee ====
- Mark Lamb, former Pinal County sheriff (2017–2024) and candidate for U.S. Senate in 2024

==== Eliminated in primary ====
- Daniel Keenan, construction contractor

==== Withdrawn ====
- Jay Feely, CBS Sports analyst and former Arizona Cardinals football player (running in the 1st district)
- Travis Grantham, former state representative from the 14th district (2017–2025) and candidate for the 4th district in 2012

==== Declined ====
- Andy Biggs, incumbent U.S. representative (running for governor)
- Jake Hoffman, state senator from the 15th district (2023–present) and 2020 fake elector for Donald Trump (endorsed Lamb)

==== Endorsements ====
Mark Lamb

Executive branch officials

- Donald Trump, 45th and 47th president of the United States (2017–2021, 2025–present)

U.S. representatives

- Eli Crane, AZ-02 (2023–present)
- Paul Gosar, AZ-09 (2011–present)
- Mike Johnson, speaker of the House (2023–present) from LA-04 (2017–present)
- David McIntosh, former IN-02 (1995–2001)
- Steve Scalise, House majority leader (2023–present) from LA-01 (2008–present)

State legislators

- Jake Hoffman, state senator from the 15th district (2023–present)

Organizations

- Arizona Police Association
- Club for Growth
- Freedom Caucus Fund
- Turning Point Action
Travis Grantham (withdrawn)

U.S. representatives

- Trent Franks, former AZ-08 (2013–2017)

State legislators

- Michael Carbone, majority leader of the Arizona House of Representatives (2025–present) from the 25th district (2023–present)

==== Fundraising ====
Italics indicate a withdrawn candidate.

Campaign finance reports as of July 1, 2026
Candidate	Raised	Spent	Cash on hand
Daniel Keenan (R)	$1,851,302 (Note: $1,650,620 was self funded)	$1,804,527	$46,776
Mark Lamb (R)	$1,222,217	$978,791	$243,426
Source: Federal Election Commission

==== Polling ====
Poll source	Date(s) administered	Sample size	Margin of error	Daniel Keenan	Mark Lamb	Jay Feely	Travis Grantham	Other	Undecided
Remington Research Group (R) (Note: Poll sponsored by Keenan's campaign)	July 5–7, 2026	650 (LV)	± 3.8%	42%	40%	–	–	–	18%
Pulse Decision Science (R) (Note: Poll sponsored by Club for Growth, which supports Lamb)	June 29 – July 1, 2026	400 (LV)	± 4.9%	27%	61%	–	–	–	12%
Remington Research Group (R)	June 22–24, 2026	1,094 (LV)	± 3.0%	46%	32%	–	–	–	22%
	March 12, 2026	Grantham withdraws from the race							
	December 19, 2025	Feely withdraws from the race							
Victory Insights (R) (Note: Poll sponsored by Lamb's campaign)	December 2–5, 2025	500 (LV)	–	2%	64%	3%	1%	–	31%
Victory Insights (R)	December 2–5, 2025	500 (LV)	–	6%	69%	–	–	–	25%
NextGenP (R)	October 10–12, 2025	830 (LV)	± 3.3%	0%	54%	7%	3%	0% (Note: Alex Stovall with 0%)	36%
NextGenP (R)	June 4, 2025	953 (LV)	± 3.0%	1%	55%	8%	3%	1% (Note: Monte Lyons with 1%)	33%
NextGenP (R)	February 26–28, 2025	892 (LV)	± 3.0%	–	49%	–	2%	9% (Note: John Lewis with 4%; Jake Hoffman with 3%; Justin Olson with 2%)	40%

Hypothetical polling

Poll source	Date(s) administered	Sample size	Margin of error	Travis Grantham	Jake Hoffman	Justin Olson	Travis Padilla	Michael Way
Victory Insights (R)	February 14–16, 2025	– (LV)	–	19%	32%	15%	12%	22%

==== Debates and forums ====
2026 Arizona's 5th congressional district Republican primary debates and forums
No.	Date	Host	Moderator	Link	Republican	Republican
Key: P Participant A Absent N Not invited I Invited W Withdrawn						
Key: P Participant A Absent N Not invited I Invited W Withdrawn					Mark Lamb	Daniel Keenan
1	June 4, 2026	Arizona Citizens Clean Elections Commission; Arizona Media Association	Danielle Lerner	YouTube	A (Note: Lamb did not take part in the scheduled debate, which became a one-on-one interview with Keenan.)	P

==== Results ====
Republican primary results by precinct: Lamb: 40–50%; 50–60%; 60–70%; 70–80%; 80–90%; 90–100%; Keenan: 40–50%; 50–60%

Republican primary results
Party	Candidate	Votes	%
Republican	Mark Lamb	52,352	58.7
Republican	Daniel Keenan	36,854	41.3
Total votes		89,206	100.0

=== Democratic primary ===
==== Nominee ====
- Elizabeth Lee, nurse

==== Eliminated in primary ====
- Brian Hualde, nurse practitioner and veteran
- Chris James, nonprofit CEO

==== Withdrawn ====
- Blake Bracht, attorney

==== Endorsements ====
Elizabeth Lee

Organizations

- CAIR Action
- Progressive Democrats of America
- Track AIPAC

==== Fundraising ====
Campaign finance reports as of July 1, 2026
Candidate	Raised	Spent	Cash on hand
Brian Hualde (D)	$53,005 (Note: $29,600 was self funded)	$47,547	$5,458
Chris James (D)	$134,852	$127,919	$6,933
Elizabeth Lee (D)	$153,111	$126,371	$26,740
Source: Federal Election Commission

==== Debate ====
2026 Arizona's 5th congressional district Democratic primary debate
No.	Date	Host	Moderator	Link	Democratic	Democratic	Democratic
Key: P Participant A Absent N Not invited I Invited W Withdrawn							
Key: P Participant A Absent N Not invited I Invited W Withdrawn					Brian Hualde	Chris James	Elizabeth Lee
1	June 4, 2026	Arizona Citizens Clean Elections Commission; Arizona Media Association	Kathleen Bade; Danielle Lerner	YouTube	P	P	P

==== Results ====
Democratic primary results
Party	Candidate	Votes	%
Democratic	Elizabeth Lee	30,857	66.0
Democratic	Chris James	9,703	20.8
Democratic	Brian Hualde	6,171	13.2
Total votes		46,731	100.0

=== General election ===
==== Predictions ====
Source	Ranking	As of
Decision Desk HQ	Likely R	July 14, 2026
The Cook Political Report	Solid R	June 30, 2025
Inside Elections	Solid R	June 30, 2025
Sabato's Crystal Ball	Safe R	July 10, 2025
The Economist	Lean R	October 24, 2026
Silver Bulletin	Solid R	August 20, 2026

==== Post-primary endorsements ====
Mark Lamb (R)

Organizations

- NRA Political Victory Fund
Elizabeth Lee (D)

Labor unions

- Arizona AFL-CIO

Organizations

- National Women's Political Caucus
- Reproductive Freedom for All

==== Fundraising ====
Campaign finance reports as of September 30, 2026
Candidate	Raised	Spent	Cash on hand
Mark Lamb (R)	$1,668,306	$1,439,354	$228,953
Elizabeth Lee (D)	$321,085	$221,417	$99,668
Source: Federal Election Commission

==== Results ====
2026 Arizona's 5th congressional district election
Party	Candidate	Votes	%	±%
Republican	Mark Lamb			
Democratic	Elizabeth Lee			
Total votes				

== District 6 ==
2026 Arizona's 6th congressional district election
- Reporting: 99% as of Nov 9 at 5:37 PM MST
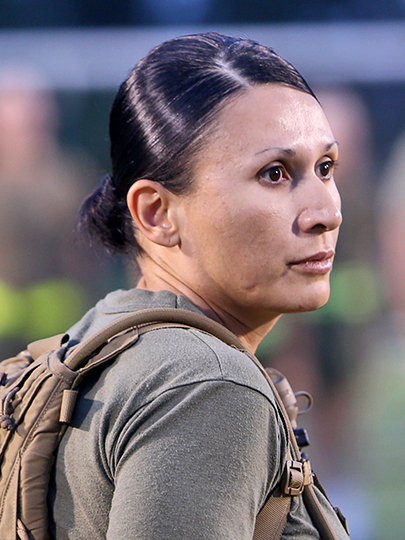

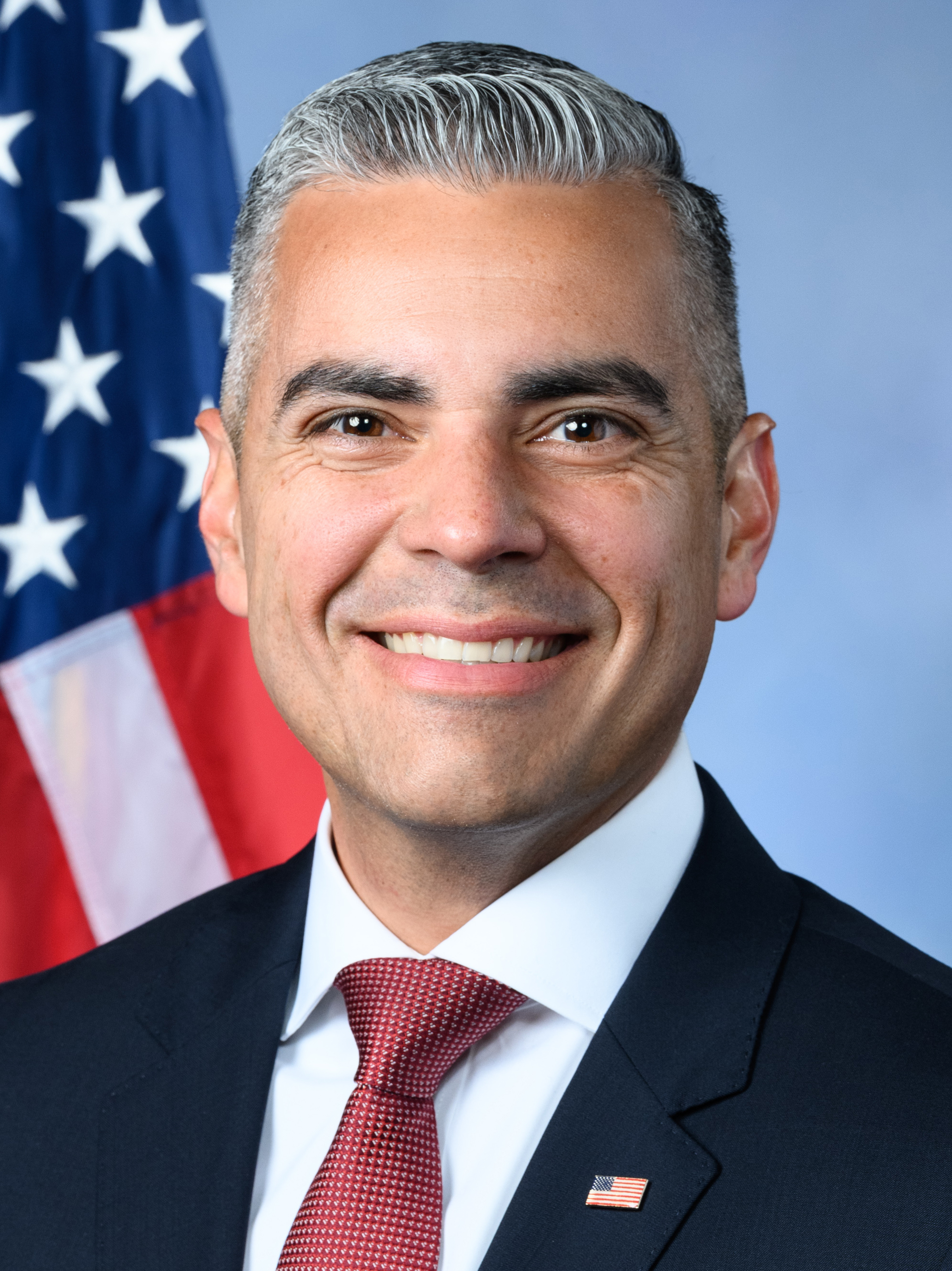
Nominee	JoAnna Mendoza	Juan Ciscomani
Party	Democratic	Republican
Popular vote	189,188	160,276
Percentage	53.0%	44.9%
- Mendoza: 50–60% Ciscomani: 50–60% 60–70% 70–80%
U.S. Representative before election
Juan Ciscomani
Republican
Elected U.S. Representative
JoAnna Mendoza
Democratic

The 6th district encompasses much of southeastern Arizona, with the bulk of its population in northern Tucson and its suburbs. The incumbent is Republican Juan Ciscomani, who was reelected with 50.0% of the vote in 2024.

=== Republican primary ===
==== Nominee ====
- Juan Ciscomani, incumbent U.S. representative

==== Endorsements ====
Juan Ciscomani

Executive branch officials

- Donald Trump, president of the United States (2017–2021, 2025–present)

U.S. representatives

- Mike Johnson, speaker of the House (2023–present) from LA-04 (2017–present)

Local officials

- 11 county supervisors (Note: Steve Christy, Pima County Supervisor; Sharon Bronson, former Pima County Supervisor (Democrat); Frank Antenori, Cochise County Supervisor; Kathleen Gomez, Cochise County Supervisor; Stephen Q. Miller, Pinal County Supervisor; John Howard, Graham County Supervisor; Clay Mack, Graham County Supervisor; Paul David, Graham County Supervisor (Democrat); Ron Campbell, Greenlee County Supervisor; David Gomez, Greenlee County Supervisor (Democrat); Will Wearne, Greenlee County Supervisor (Independent))

Organizations

- AIPAC
- Log Cabin Republicans
- Republican Jewish Coalition

==== Fundraising ====
Campaign finance reports as of July 1, 2026
Candidate	Raised	Spent	Cash on hand
Juan Ciscomani (R)	$6,172,867	$2,274,265	$4,135,163
Source: Federal Election Commission

==== Results ====
Republican primary results
Party	Candidate	Votes	%
Republican	Juan Ciscomani (incumbent)	76,481	100.0
Total votes		76,481	100.0

=== Democratic primary ===
==== Nominee ====
- JoAnna Mendoza, former veteran services representative for U.S. Representative Tom O'Halleran and nominee for Arizona's 11th senate district in 2020

==== Withdrawn ====
- Johnathan Buma, former FBI agent
- Chris Donat, mechanical engineer
- Mo Goldman, immigration attorney (endorsed Mendoza)
- Samantha Severson, faculty member at the University of Arizona Global Campus
- Aiden Swallow, theater performer (running for state house)

==== Declined ====
- Kirsten Engel, former state senator from the 10th district (2021) and nominee for this district in 2022 and 2024

==== Endorsements ====
JoAnna Mendoza

Executive branch officials

- Patrick Murphy, former under secretary of the army (2016–2017)
- Maura Sullivan, former assistant to the secretary of defense for public affairs (2015)

U.S. senators

- Ruben Gallego, Arizona (2025–present)
- Mark Kelly, Arizona (2020–present)

U.S. representatives

- Ron Barber, former AZ-02 (2012–2015)
- Jason Crow, CO-06 (2019–present)
- Suzan DelBene, WA-01 (2012–present)
- Chris Deluzio, PA-17 (2023–present)
- Gabby Giffords, former AZ-08 (2007–2012)
- Ro Khanna, CA-17 (2017–present)
- Seth Moulton, MA-06 (2015–present)
- Tom O'Halleran, former AZ-01 (2017–2023)
- Emily Randall, WA-06 (2025–present)
- Max Rose, former NY-11 (2019–2021)
- Linda Sánchez, CA-38 (2003–present)
- Greg Stanton, AZ-04 (2019–present)
- Mark Takano, CA-39 (2013–present)
- Ritchie Torres, NY-15 (2021–present)

Individuals

- Rebecca Bennett, healthcare executive and former United States Navy aviator
- Cait Conley, former senior advisor to the Cybersecurity and Infrastructure Security Agency

Labor unions

- National Education Association

Organizations

- Congressional Hispanic Caucus BOLD PAC
- Equality PAC
- DCCC Red to Blue
- Democrats for Education Reform
- Elect Democratic Women
- EMILYs List
- End Citizens United
- Giffords
- Human Rights Campaign
- J Street
- Jewish Democratic Council of America
- Latino Victory Fund
- League of Conservation Voters Action Fund
- LGBTQ+ Victory Fund
- LPAC
- National Women's Political Caucus
- New Democrat Coalition
- PODER PAC
- Population Connection
- Reproductive Freedom for All
- Stonewall Democratic Club
- Vote Mama
- Vote Vets

==== Fundraising ====
Italics indicate a withdrawn candidate.

Campaign finance reports as of July 1, 2026
Candidate	Raised	Spent	Cash on hand
JoAnna Mendoza (D)	$7,354,599	$4,093,848	$3,260,752
Source: Federal Election Commission

==== Results ====
Democratic primary results
Party	Candidate	Votes	%
Democratic	JoAnna Mendoza	78,310	100.0
Total votes		78,310	100.0

=== Libertarian primary ===
==== Nominee ====
- Jereme Peters

==== Fundraising ====
Campaign finance reports as of July 1, 2026
Candidate	Raised	Spent	Cash on hand
Jereme Peters (L)	$10,500	$10,500	$0
Source: Federal Election Commission

==== Results ====
Libertarian primary results
Party	Candidate	Votes	%
Libertarian	Jereme Peters	277	100.0
Total votes		277	100.0

=== Green primary ===
==== Nominee ====
- Gary Swing (write-in)

==== Endorsements ====
Gary Swing

Political parties

- Green Party of Arizona

==== Results ====
Green primary results
Party	Candidate	Votes	%
Green	Gary Swing (write-in)	29	100.0
Total votes		29	100.0

=== No Labels primary ===
==== Disqualified ====
- Iman Bah

==== Fundraising ====
Campaign finance reports as of March 31, 2026
Candidate	Raised	Spent	Cash on hand
Iman Bah (I)	$195	$75	$225
Trevor Dickerson (I) (Note: As last reported on September 30, 2025)	$19,352	$13,277	$5,576
Source: Federal Election Commission

=== General election ===
==== Predictions ====
Source	Ranking	As of
Decision Desk HQ	Likely D (flip)	September 8, 2026
The Cook Political Report	Lean D (flip)	October 23, 2026
Inside Elections	Tilt D (flip)	October 29, 2026
Sabato's Crystal Ball	Lean D (flip)	October 20, 2025
The Economist	Likely D (flip)	October 24, 2026
Silver Bulletin	Likely D (flip)	October 22, 2026

==== Post-primary endorsements ====
Juan Ciscomani (R)

Organizations

- NRA Political Victory Fund
JoAnna Mendoza (D)

U.S. representatives

- Adam Gray, CA-13 (2025–present)

Statewide officials

- Mikie Sherrill, governor of New Jersey (2026–present)

Labor unions

- Arizona AFL-CIO
- United Auto Workers

Organizations

- Blue Dog PAC

==== Fundraising ====
Italics indicate a withdrawn candidate.

Campaign finance reports as of October 14, 2026
Candidate	Raised	Spent	Cash on hand
Juan Ciscomani (R)	$7,649,794	$7,267,656	$618,699
JoAnna Mendoza (D)	$11,242,473	$10,434,574	$807,899
Source: Federal Election Commission

==== Polling ====
Juan Ciscomani vs. JoAnna Mendoza

Poll source	Date(s) administered	Sample size	Margin of error	Juan Ciscomani (R)	JoAnna Mendoza (D)	Other	Undecided
Normington Petts (D) (Note: Poll sponsored by House Majority PAC, which supports Democratic candidates)	June 8–11, 2026	500 (LV)	± 4.4%	45%	47%	—	8%
Ragnar Research Partners (R) (Note: Poll commissioned by Conservatives For America, an organization linked to the Republican Study Committee)	March 12–14, 2026	400 (LV)	± 5.0%	44%	47%	—	9%
Public Policy Polling (D) (Note: Poll commissioned by the House Majority PAC, which supports Mendoza)	October 14–15, 2025	581 (LV)	–	41%	42%	—	17%

Hypothetical polling

Generic Republican vs. generic Democrat

Poll source	Date(s) administered	Sample size	Margin of error	Generic Republican	Generic Democrat	Undecided
Ragnar Research Partners (R)	March 12–14, 2026	400 (LV)	± 5.0%	42%	43%	15%

==== Results ====
2026 Arizona's 6th congressional district election
Party	Candidate	Votes	%	±%
Republican	Juan Ciscomani (incumbent)			
Democratic	JoAnna Mendoza			
Libertarian	Jereme Peters			
Green	Gary Swing			
Total votes				

== District 7 ==
2026 Arizona's 7th congressional district election
- Reporting: 98% as of Nov 10 at 7:28 AM MST
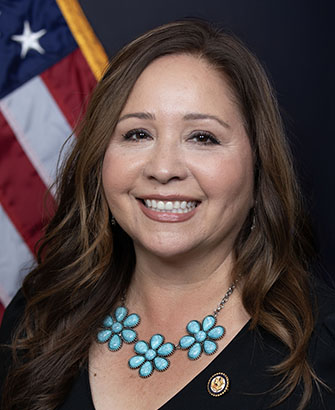

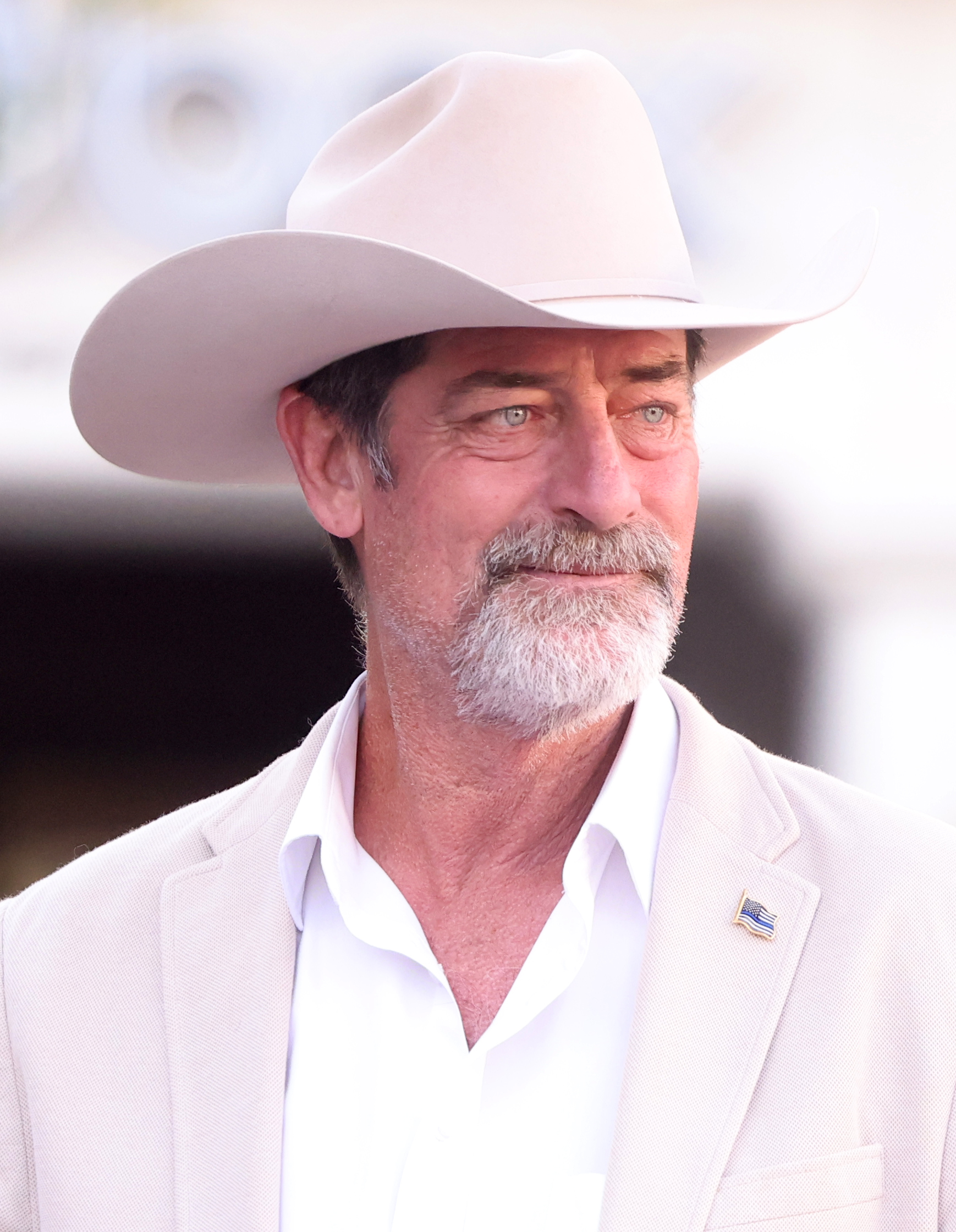
Nominee	Adelita Grijalva	Daniel Butierez
Party	Democratic	Republican
Popular vote	144,702	56,345
Percentage	72.0%	28.0%
- Grijalva: 60–70% 70–80% Butierez: 50–60%
U.S. Representative before election
Adelita Grijalva
Democratic
Elected U.S. Representative
Adelita Grijalva
Democratic

The 7th district is majority-Hispanic and covers most of the Mexico–United States border in Arizona, including parts of Tucson and Yuma. The incumbent is Democrat Adelita Grijalva, who was elected with 68.9% of the vote in a special election to finish the term of her father, Democrat Raúl Grijalva, who died in office on March 13, 2025. The younger Grijalva announced her intentions to run for election to a full term in 2026.

=== Democratic primary ===
==== Nominee ====
- Adelita Grijalva, incumbent U.S. representative

==== Endorsements ====
Adelita Grijalva

Labor unions

- National Education Association

Organizations

- CAIR Action
- Emily's List
- End Citizens United
- Giffords
- J Street
- League of Conservation Voters
- Our Revolution
- Planned Parenthood Action Fund
- Population Connection
- Progressive Democrats of America
- Reproductive Freedom for All
- Track AIPAC

==== Fundraising ====
Campaign finance reports as of July 1, 2026
Candidate	Raised	Spent	Cash on hand
Adelita Grijalva (D)	$2,285,639	$1,857,663	$427,977
Source: Federal Election Commission

==== Results ====
Democratic primary results
Party	Candidate	Votes	%
Democratic	Adelita Grijalva (incumbent)	59,304	100.0
Total votes		59,304	100.0

=== Republican primary ===
==== Nominee ====
- Daniel Butierez, painting contractor and nominee for this district in 2024 and 2025

==== Fundraising ====
Campaign finance reports as of July 1, 2026
Candidate	Raised	Spent	Cash on hand
Daniel Butierez (R)	$224,367 (Note: $175,207 was self funded)	$213,560	$11,399
Source: Federal Election Commission

==== Results ====
Republican primary results
Party	Candidate	Votes	%
Republican	Daniel Butierez	21,934	100.0
Total votes		21,934	100.0

=== General election ===
==== Predictions ====
Source	Ranking	As of
Decision Desk HQ	Safe D	July 14, 2026
The Cook Political Report	Solid D	June 30, 2025
Inside Elections	Solid D	June 30, 2025
Sabato's Crystal Ball	Safe D	July 10, 2025
The Economist	Safe D	May 6, 2026
Silver Bulletin	Solid D	August 20, 2026

==== Post-primary endorsements ====
Adelita Grijalva (D)

Labor unions

- Arizona AFL-CIO

Organizations

- National Women's Political Caucus

==== Fundraising ====
Campaign finance reports as of September 30, 2026
Candidate	Raised	Spent	Cash on hand
Adelita Grijalva (D)	$2,509,134	$2,039,746	$469,388
Daniel Butierez (R)	$232,232	$220,426	$12,399
Source: Federal Election Commission

==== Results ====
2026 Arizona's 7th congressional district election
Party	Candidate	Votes	%	±%
Democratic	Adelita Grijalva (incumbent)			
Republican	Daniel Butierez			
Total votes				

== District 8 ==
2026 Arizona's 8th congressional district election
- Reporting: 99% as of Nov 10 at 7:28 AM MST
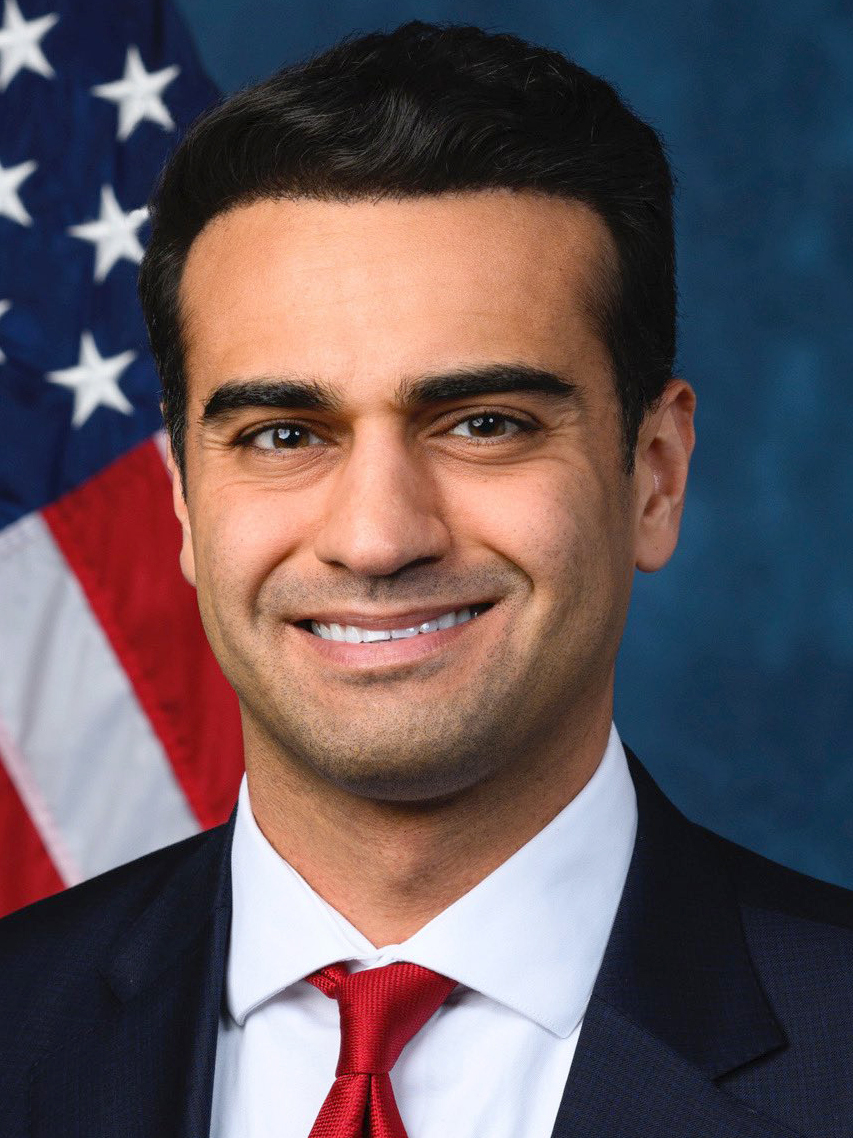

Nominee	Abraham Hamadeh	Bernadette Greene-Placentia
Party	Republican	Democratic
Popular vote	146,439	139,431
Percentage	51.2%	48.8%
- Hamadeh: 50–60% 60–70% 70–80% Greene-Placentia: 50–60% 60–70% 70–80% No votes
U.S. Representative before election
Abraham Hamadeh
Republican
Elected U.S. Representative
Abraham Hamadeh
Republican

The 8th district is based in the northern and western suburbs of Phoenix, including northern Glendale and Peoria. The incumbent is Republican Abraham Hamadeh, who was elected in 2024 with 56.5% of the vote.

=== Republican primary ===
==== Nominee ====
- Abraham Hamadeh, incumbent U.S. representative

==== Endorsements ====
Abraham Hamadeh

Executive branch officials

- Donald Trump, 45th and 47th president of the United States (2017–2021, 2025–present)

Organizations

- AIPAC
- Republicans for National Renewal
- Turning Point Action

==== Fundraising ====
Campaign finance reports as of July 1, 2026
Candidate	Raised	Spent	Cash on hand
Abraham Hamadeh (R)	$1,206,361	$858,585	$384,185
Source: Federal Election Commission

==== Results ====
Republican primary results
Party	Candidate	Votes	%
Republican	Abraham Hamadeh (incumbent)	69,182	100.0
Total votes		69,182	100.0

=== Democratic primary ===
==== Nominee ====
- Bernadette Greene-Placentia, truck driver

==== Eliminated in primary ====
- Raymond Keeler, software engineer and veteran

==== Fundraising ====
Campaign finance reports as of July 1, 2026
Candidate	Raised	Spent	Cash on hand
Bernadette Greene-Placentia (D) (Note: As last reported on March 31, 2026)	$209,358	$17,589	$190,394
Raymond Keeler (D)	$39,356	$40,863	$0
Source: Federal Election Commission

==== Debate ====
2026 Arizona's 8th congressional district Democratic primary debate
No.	Date	Host	Moderator	Link	Democratic	Democratic
Key: P Participant A Absent N Not invited I Invited W Withdrawn						
Key: P Participant A Absent N Not invited I Invited W Withdrawn					Bernadette Greene-Placentia	Raymond Keeler
1	June 15, 2026	Arizona Citizens Clean Elections Commission; Arizona Media Association	Danielle Lerner	YouTube	P	P

==== Results ====
Democratic primary results
Party	Candidate	Votes	%
Democratic	Bernadette Greene-Placentia	31,312	65.7
Democratic	Raymond Keeler	16,324	34.3
Total votes		47,636	100.0

=== No Labels primary ===
==== Withdrawn ====
- Jessie Martines, veteran

=== General election ===
==== Predictions ====
Source	Ranking	As of
Decision Desk HQ	Likely R	July 14, 2026
The Cook Political Report	Solid R	June 30, 2025
Inside Elections	Solid R	June 30, 2025
Sabato's Crystal Ball	Safe R	July 10, 2025
The Economist	Likely R	May 6, 2026
Silver Bulletin	Likely R	October 22, 2026

==== Post-primary endorsements ====
Abraham Hamadeh (R)

Organizations

- NRA Political Victory Fund
- U.S. Chamber of Commerce
Bernadette Greene-Placentia (D)

Labor unions

- Arizona AFL-CIO

Organizations

- National Women's Political Caucus

==== Fundraising ====
Campaign finance reports as of September 30, 2026
Candidate	Raised	Spent	Cash on hand
Abraham Hamadeh (R)	$1,359,849	$1,258,373	$137,885
Bernadette Greene-Placentia (D)	$236,528	$23,341	$21,841
Source: Federal Election Commission

==== Results ====
2026 Arizona's 8th congressional district election
Party	Candidate	Votes	%	±%
Republican	Abraham Hamadeh (incumbent)			
Democratic	Bernadette Greene-Placentia			
Total votes				

== District 9 ==
2026 Arizona's 9th congressional district election
- Reporting: 98% as of Nov 10 at 7:28 AM MST
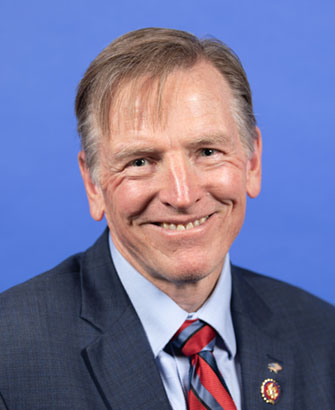

Nominee	Paul Gosar	Danielle Sterbinsky
Party	Republican	Democratic
Popular vote	163,956	121,333
Percentage	57.5%	42.5%
- Gosar: 60–70% 70–80% Sterbinsky: 50–60%
U.S. Representative before election
Paul Gosar
Republican
Elected U.S. Representative
Paul Gosar
Republican

The 9th district encompasses much of western Arizona, including portions of Yuma and western Maricopa County. The incumbent is Republican Paul Gosar, who was reelected with 65.3% of the vote in 2024.

=== Republican primary ===
==== Nominee ====
- Paul Gosar, incumbent U.S. representative

==== Endorsements ====
Paul Gosar

Executive branch officials

- Donald Trump, 45th and 47th president of the United States (2017–2021, 2025–present)

Organizations

- Freedom Caucus Fund
- Turning Point Action

==== Fundraising ====
Campaign finance reports as of July 1, 2026
Candidate	Raised	Spent	Cash on hand
Paul Gosar (R)	$580,043	$368,426	$303,214
Source: Federal Election Commission

==== Results ====
Republican primary results
Party	Candidate	Votes	%
Republican	Paul Gosar (incumbent)	79,336	100.0
Total votes		79,336	100.0

=== Democratic primary ===
==== Nominee ====
- Danielle Sterbinsky, U.S. Navy veteran

==== Fundraising ====
Campaign finance reports as of July 1, 2026
Candidate	Raised	Spent	Cash on hand
Danielle Sterbinsky (D)	$354,383	$332,316	$25,745
Source: Federal Election Commission

==== Results ====
Democratic primary results
Party	Candidate	Votes	%
Democratic	Danielle Sterbinsky	35,700	100.0
Total votes		35,700	100.0

=== General election ===
==== Predictions ====
Source	Ranking	As of
Decision Desk HQ	Safe R	July 14, 2026
The Cook Political Report	Solid R	June 30, 2025
Inside Elections	Solid R	June 30, 2025
Sabato's Crystal Ball	Safe R	July 10, 2025
The Economist	Safe R	May 6, 2026
Silver Bulletin	Solid R	August 20, 2026

==== Post-primary endorsements ====
Paul Gosar (R)

Organizations

- NRA Political Victory Fund
Dani Sterbinsky (D)

Political parties

- Forward Party

==== Fundraising ====
Campaign finance reports as of September 30, 2026
Candidate	Raised	Spent	Cash on hand
Paul Gosar (R)	$764,144	$536,769	$318,972
Danielle Sterbinsky (D)	$437,021	$411,224	$29,475
Source: Federal Election Commission

==== Results ====
2026 Arizona's 9th congressional district election
Party	Candidate	Votes	%	±%
Republican	Paul Gosar (incumbent)			
Democratic	Danielle Sterbinsky			
Total votes				

== Notes ==
Partisan clients
