= Sine Kerr =

American politician

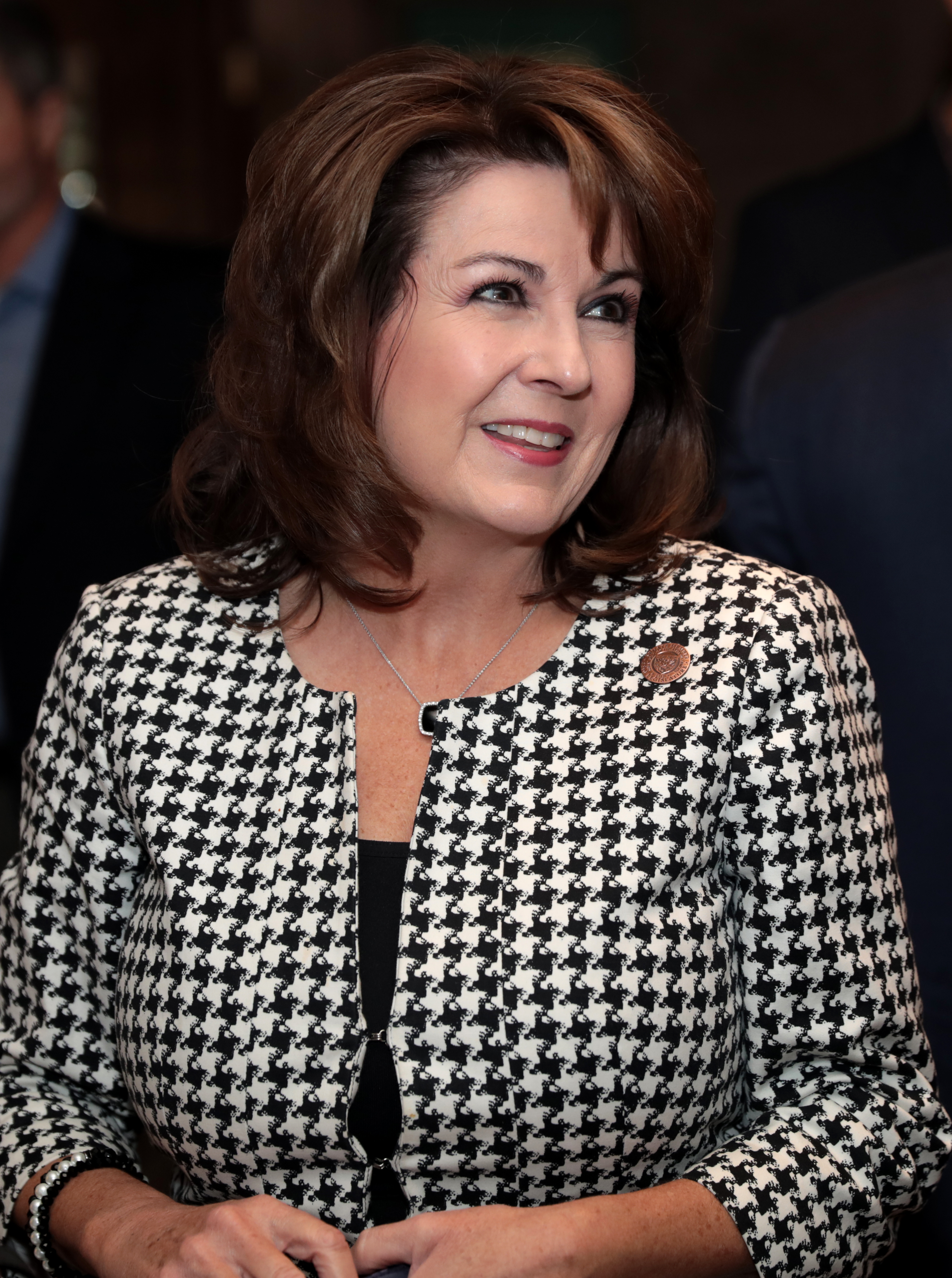
- Kerr in 2018

Member of the Arizona Senate
- In office January 21, 2018 – January 13, 2025
- Preceded by: Steve Montenegro
- Succeeded by: Tim Dunn
- Constituency: 13th district (2018–2023); 25th district (2023–2025)

Personal details
- Born: 1959 or 1960 (age 65–66) Fort Benning, Georgia, U.S.
- Party: Republican
- Spouse: Bill Kerr (m. 1980)
- Children: 4

Sine Kerr (/ˈsiːnə kɜːr/; born 1959/1960) is an American politician and a Republican former member of the Arizona Senate representing District 25 from 2023 to 2025. She was previously appointed to the District 13 seat in January 2018. In 2026 she was selected by gubernatorial candidate Andy Biggs to be his running mate, making Kerr the first ever Republican nominee for Lieutenant Governor of Arizona.

== Background and business activities ==
Kerr grew up in rural Buckeye, Arizona, and graduated from Buckeye Union High School. She owns a large dairy farm.

== Political career ==
=== Appointment and elections ===
Kerr is the member for state Senate District 13, which covers the West Valley. In January 2018, she was appointed by the Maricopa County Board of Supervisors from among a list of three candidates to fill the state Senate seat, which was vacated by Steve Montenegro who resigned to run for a special election for the seat in Congress vacated by Trent Franks.

In August 2018, Kerr won the Republican nomination for a full term in office, defeating Brent Backus and Don Shooter.

=== Tenure ===
In 2021, Kerr proposed legislation that would ban nearly all abortions in Arizona, even in cases of rape or incest. The bill would subject physicians who perform abortions, and anyone assisting them, to prison terms of almost nine years. Kerr proposed the measure as an amendment to an unrelated bill on license plate designs. Abortion-rights groups said that Kerr's proposal was flagrantly unconstitutional.

In 2021, Kerr, along with other Republican state legislators and Republican Governor Doug Ducey, supported legislation to strip the Arizona Corporation Commission (the state utilities regulator) of its power to set renewable energy portfolio standards for the state. The legislation was opposed by Democrats, environmental groups, and some business groups.

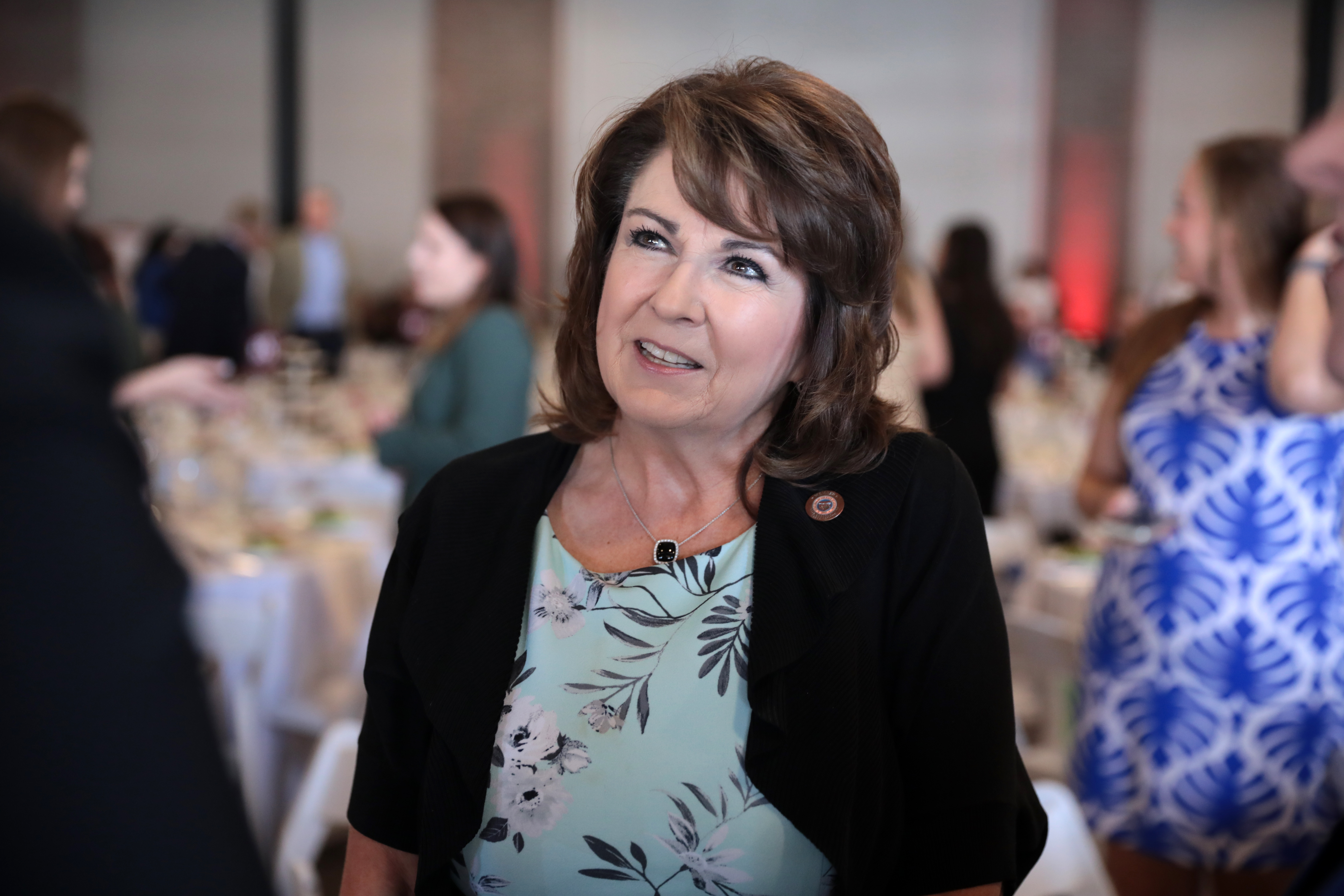
Kerr speaking with attendees at the 2022 Annual Awards Luncheon at Republic National Distributing Company of Arizona in Phoenix, Arizona.

Kerr supported legislation to make it easier to block statewide voter ballot initiatives by requiring initiative proponents to gain a certain percentage of signatures in each of Arizona's 30 legislative districts to get on the ballot; the proposal would essentially allow a single district to block a ballot initiative proposal that was broadly supported elsewhere. The legislation was pushed by Republican state legislators and business interests in 2019 after Arizona voters approved a 2016 initiative to raise the state's minimum wage and a 2006 initiative to ban the use of gestation crates in pigs and calves (a measure that angered agribusiness). The legislation was opposed by the League of Women Voters.

As chair of the state Senate's Natural Resources, Energy and Water Committee, Kerr blocked legislation to protect Arizona's watersheds from being added to the committee's hearing schedule.

In May 2025, Kerr was appointed to the U.S Department of Agriculture as the State Executive Director for the Arizona Farm Service Agency.

Party political offices
First	Republican nominee for Lieutenant Governor of Arizona; 2026	Most recent
