= Independent Group =

Independent Group may refer to:

- Independent Group (art movement), a group of artists
- Independent Group (Kenya), a defunct political party in Kenya
- Independent Group (Solomon Islands), a political faction in the Solomon Islands
- Independent Group (Turkey), a former opposition group in the Turkish parliament
- Independent Group of Benalmádena, a municipal political party in Benalmádena, Spain
- Independent Group of the Condado de Treviño, a municipal political party in Condado de Treviño, Spain
- The Independent Group for Change, a former political party founded and dissolved in 2019 in the United Kingdom

== Groups with similar names ==
- Independent Labour Group, a nationalist political party in Northern Ireland, active 1958–1965
- Independent Parliamentary Group, a right-wing UK political organisation, active 1920–1921
- Labour Independent Group, an organisation of former UK Labour MPs, active 1948–1950
- Independent Senate Group (in Dutch: Onafhankelijke SenaatsFractie), a Dutch parliamentary group in the First Chamber of the parliament, since 1995
- Technical Group of Independents (disambiguation), two separate groups in the European Parliament, active 1979-84 and 1999-2001
- Independents 4 Change, a political group in the Republic of Ireland, formed in 2014
- The Independents (UK), a political group in the United Kingdom, formed in July 2019

== See also ==
- The Independent (disambiguation)
