= National Independent Party (disambiguation) =

The National Independent Party is a political party in Lesotho.

National Independent Party may also refer to:

- National Independent Party (Guyana), a political party in Guyana
- Greenback Party, a political party in the United States 1874–1889, known at one point as the National Independent Party

== See also ==
- Independent National Party (disambiguation)
