= 2026 Arizona gubernatorial election =

- November 3, 2026
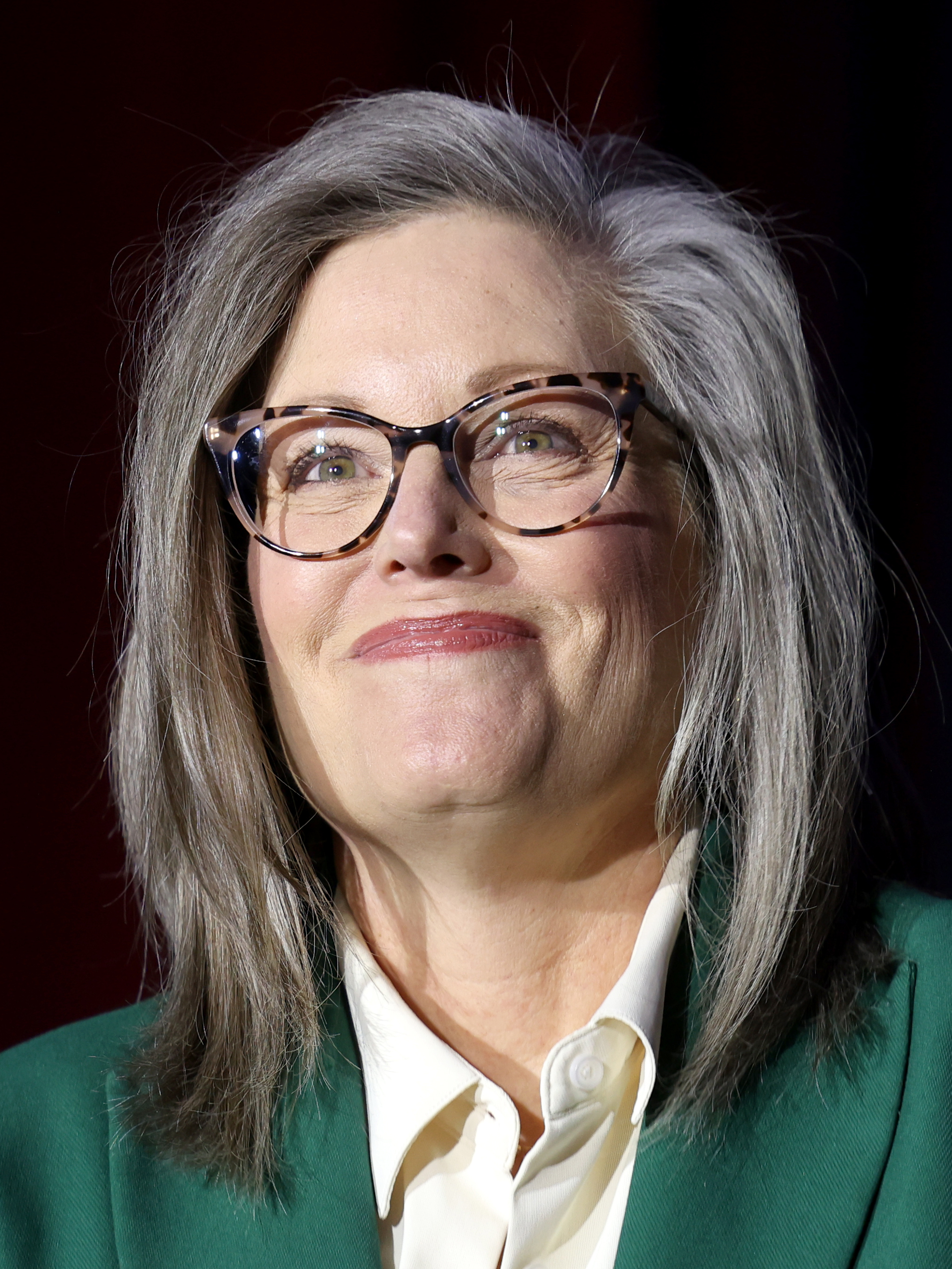

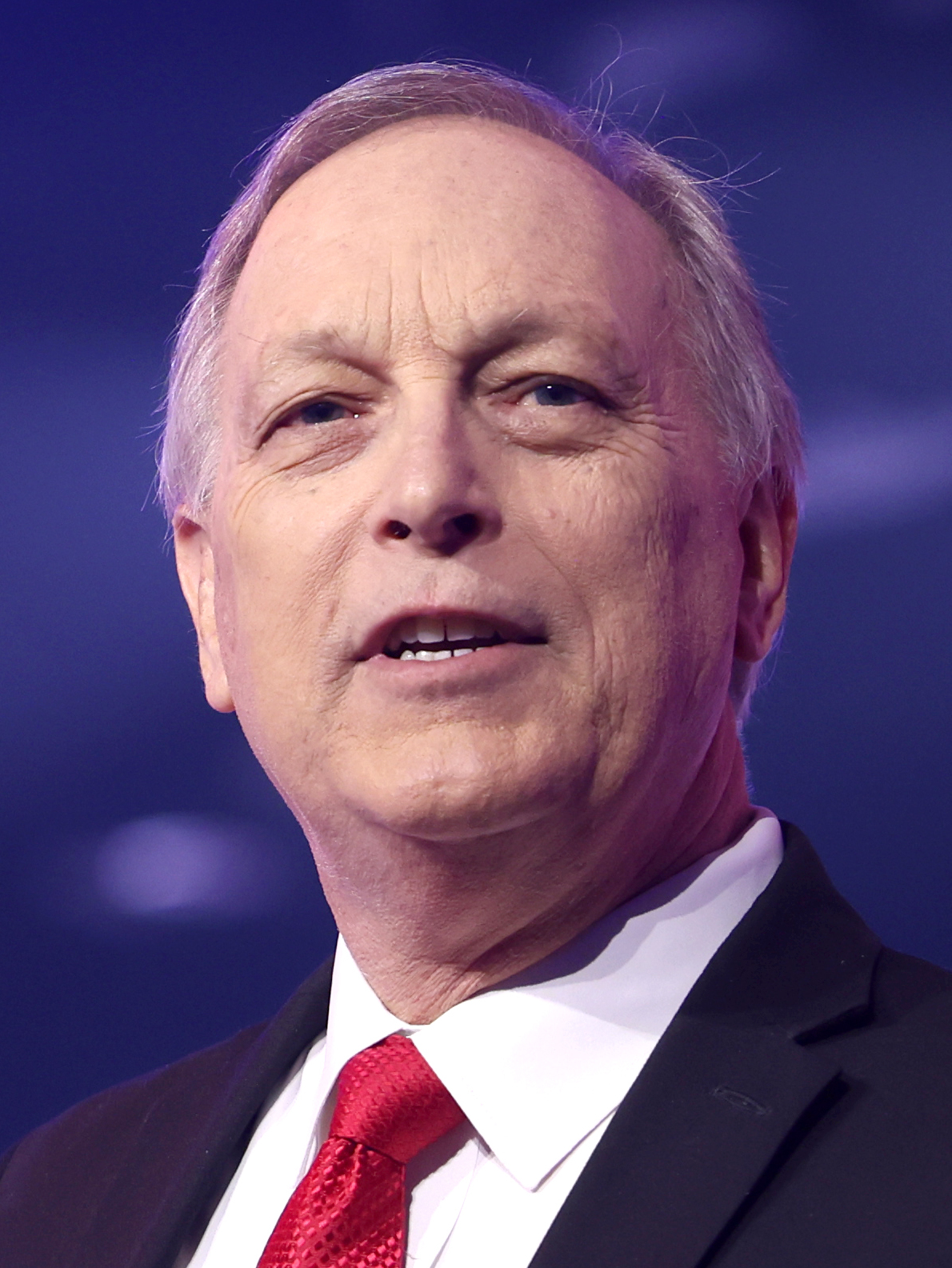
Nominee	Katie Hobbs	Andy Biggs
Party	Democratic	Republican
Running mate	John Giles	Sine Kerr
Popular vote	1,434,813	1,094,388
Percentage	55.67%	42.46%
- Hobbs: 40-50 50–60% 60–70% 70–80% 80-90% Biggs: 40–50% 50–60% 60–70% 70–80%
Governor before election
Katie Hobbs
Democratic
Elected Governor
Katie Hobbs
Democratic

The 2026 Arizona gubernatorial election was held on November 3, 2026, to elect the governor of Arizona. Democratic incumbent Katie Hobbs won a second term, defeating Republican congressman Andy Biggs. Her 13-point margin of victory was a significant improvement over her performance in the 2022 election, which she won by 0.67%.

Primary elections took place on July 21, 2026. Hobbs secured the Democratic nomination unopposed. Biggs secured the Republican nomination over congressman David Schweikert with 73.6% of the vote.

Following the passage of Proposition 131 in the 2022 elections, this was the first gubernatorial election in Arizona in which candidates would be required to nominate a running mate for the newly established position of lieutenant governor. This was one of five Democratic-held governorships up for election in 2026 in a state that Donald Trump won in the 2024 presidential election.

== Background ==
Arizona is considered to be a purple state at both the federal and statewide level. After Joe Biden carried the state narrowly in the 2020 presidential election, Donald Trump carried the state of Arizona by 5.5 points in the 2024 presidential election. Democrats control both U.S. Senate seats in Arizona and hold the governorship, secretary of state office, and attorney general office. Meanwhile, Republicans maintain a majority in the Arizona Senate and Arizona House of Representatives, and control 6 of the 9 House of Representatives seats in the state. Democrats have characterized this race as key to establishing a Democratic trifecta in Arizona for the first time in 60 years.

== Democratic primary ==
=== Candidates ===
==== Nominee ====
- Katie Hobbs, incumbent governor (2023–present)
  - Running mate: John Giles, former mayor of Mesa (2014–2025) (Independent)

==== Declined ====
- Adrian Fontes, secretary of state of Arizona (2023–present) (ran for re-election)
- Kris Mayes, attorney general of Arizona (2023–present) (ran for re-election)

=== Endorsements ===
Katie Hobbs

U.S. representatives

- Yassamin Ansari, AZ-03 (2025–present)
- Greg Stanton, AZ-04 (2019–present)

Labor unions

- International Association of Machinists and Aerospace Workers Arizona State Council

Organizations

- Arizona Alliance for Retired Americans
- Arizona Stonewall Democrats
- EMILYs List
- End Citizens United
- Giffords
- Jewish Democratic Council of America
- Natural Resources Defense Council
- Planned Parenthood Advocates of Arizona
- Reproductive Freedom for All

Individuals

- Cindy McCain, former executive director of the World Food Program and widow of John McCain (Republican)

=== Results ===
Democratic primary results
Party	Candidate	Votes	%
Democratic	Katie Hobbs (incumbent)	512,550	100.0
Total votes		512,550	100.0

== Republican primary ==
=== Candidates ===
==== Nominee ====
- Andy Biggs, U.S. representative from Arizona's 5th congressional district (2017–present)
  - Running mate: Sine Kerr, former state senator (2018–2025)

==== Eliminated in primary ====
- Ken Miceli, business owner
- Scott Neely, concrete pumping contractor, candidate for governor in 2022, and candidate for mayor of Mesa in 2024
- David Schweikert, U.S. representative from Arizona's 1st congressional district (2011–present)

==== Withdrawn ====
- Karrin Taylor Robson, former member of the Arizona Board of Regents (2017–2021) and candidate for governor in 2022

==== Declined ====
- Juan Ciscomani, U.S. representative from Arizona's 6th congressional district (2023–present) (running for re-election)
- Jake Hoffman, state senator from the 15th district (2023–present) and 2020 fake elector for Donald Trump (endorsed Biggs)
- Kari Lake, senior advisor to the U.S. Agency for Global Media (2025–present), nominee for governor in 2022, and nominee for U.S. Senate in 2024
- Kimberly Yee, state treasurer of Arizona (2019–present) and candidate for governor in 2022 (running for superintendent of public instruction)

=== Endorsements ===
Andy Biggs

Executive branch officials

- Donald Trump, president of the United States (2017–2021, 2025–present) (co-endorsement with Taylor Robson)

U.S. senators

- Mike Lee, Utah (2011–present)

U.S. representatives

- Lauren Boebert, CO-04 (2021–present)
- Eli Crane, AZ-02 (2023–present)
- Paul Gosar, AZ-09 (2011–present)
- Burgess Owens, UT-04 (2021–present)
- Tom Emmer, House Majority Whip from MN-06 (2015–present)
- Matt Gaetz, former FL-01 (2017–2024)
- Debbie Lesko, former AZ-08 (2018–2025) and member of the Maricopa County Board of Supervisors from the 4th district (2025–present)

State legislators

- Jake Hoffman, SD-15 (2023–present)
- Rachel Keshel, HD-17 (2023–present)

Individuals

- Charlie Kirk, CEO of Turning Point USA (deceased)
- Erika Kirk, CEO of Turning Point USA

Organizations

- Arizona Freedom Caucus
- Freedom Caucus Fund
- Republicans for National Renewal
- Turning Point Action
Karrin Taylor Robson (withdrawn)

Executive branch officials

- Donald Trump, president of the United States (2017–2021, 2025–present) (co-endorsement with Biggs)
- Sarah Huckabee Sanders, governor of Arkansas (2023–present) and former White House Press Secretary (2017–2019)

U.S. senators

- Pete Ricketts, Nebraska (2023–present)

U.S. representatives

- Newt Gingrich, former speaker of the United States House of Representatives (1995–1999) from GA-06 (1979–1999)

State legislators

- Michael Carbone, majority leader of the Arizona House of Representatives (2025–present) from HD-25 (2023–present)
- Janae Shamp, majority leader of the Arizona Senate (2025–present) from SD-29 (2023–present)
- 1 state senators (Note: Tim Dunn, SD-25 (2025–present) (co-endorsement with Taylor Robson))
- 5 state representatives (Note: Walter Blackman, HD-07 (2025–present); Selina Bliss, HD-01 (2023–present); David Livingston, HD-28 (2023–present); Justin Wilmeth, HD-02 (2023–present); Teresa Martinez, HD-16 (2021–present))

Individuals

- Rob Schneider, actor

Organizations

- Maggie's List

=== Polling ===
Aggregate polls

Source of poll aggregation	Dates administered	Dates updated	Andy Biggs	David Schweikert	Other/ Undecided (Note: Calculated by taking the difference of 100% and all other candidates combined.)	Margin
270toWin	June 29 – July 9, 2025	July 9, 2026	63.0%	10.0%	31.0% (Note: Scott Neely with 3.0%; Ken Miceli with 2.0%)	Biggs +53.0%

Poll source	Date(s) administered	Sample size (Note: Key: A – all adults RV – registered voters LV – likely voters V – unclear)	Margin of error	Andy Biggs	Karrin Taylor Robson	David Schweikert	Other	Undecided
NextGen P (R)	July 8–9, 2026	1,707 (LV)	± 2.5%	66%	–	10%	7% (Note: Scott Neely with 4%; Ken Miceli with 3%)	17%
Noble Predictive Insights	June 29 – July 1, 2026	425 (LV)	± 4.8%	60%	–	10%	4% (Note: Scott Neely with 2%; Ken Miceli and "Another candidate not mentioned" with 1%)	26%
NextGen P (R)	June 16–17, 2026	1,683 (LV)	± 2.5%	57%	–	11%	5% (Note: Scott Neely with 3%; Ken Miceli with 2%)	27%
Stealth Analytics	May 13–15, 2026	1,100 (LV)	± 3.0%	55%	–	9%	2%	34%
Noble Predictive Insights	May 5–7, 2026	375 (RV)	± 5.0%	48%	–	18%	–	34%
NextGen P (R)	April 13–16, 2026	1,255 (LV)	± 2.7%	52%	–	10%	3% (Note: Scott Neely with 2%; Ken Miceli with 1%)	35%
Noble Predictive Insights	February 23–26, 2026	384 (RV)	± 5.0%	40%	–	19%	–	41%
	February 12, 2026	Taylor Robson suspends her campaign.						
Center for Excellence in Polling	January 22–24, 2026	– (LV)	–	28%	19%	12%	–	41%
Emerson College	November 8–10, 2025	381 (RV)	± 5.0%	50%	17%	8%	1% (Note: "Someone else" with 1%)	24%
GrayHouse (R)	October 26–28, 2025	397 (LV)	± 3.6%	43%	19%	2%	–	36%
Pulse Decision Science (R)	September 8–10, 2025	502 (LV)	± 4.4%	48%	26%	11%	–	15%
Pulse Decision Science (R)	September 8–10, 2025	502 (LV)	± 4.4%	55%	31%	–	–	14%
Pulse Decision Science (R)	September 8–10, 2025	502 (LV)	± 4.4%	61%	–	23%	–	16%
Kreate Strategies (R)	August 19–21, 2025	679 (RV)	–	65%	14%	–	–	21%
Noble Predictive Insights	August 11–18, 2025	385 (RV)	± 5.0%	27%	37%	–	–	36%
NextGen P (R)	June 17–18, 2025	1,380 (LV)	± 2.6%	49%	26%	–	8%	17%
Kreate Strategies (R) (Note: Poll sponsored by American Commitment)	May 23–25, 2025	1,147 (LV)	± 2.9%	57%	25%	–	–	18%
Pulse Decision Science (R) (Note: Poll sponsored by Club for Growth)	April 6–9, 2025	511 (LV)	± 4.4%	45%	16%	–	–	39%
NicoPAC (R)	April 2–6, 2025	477 (RV)	± 4.5%	66%	15%	–	4%	15%
NicoPAC (R)	January 24–26, 2025	512 (RV)	± 4.3%	71%	14%	–	–	15%

Hypothetical polling

Andy Biggs vs. Charlie Kirk vs. Jack McCain vs. Jake Hoffman vs. Karrin Taylor Robson vs. Kimberly Yee

Poll source	Date(s) administered	Sample size	Margin of error	Andy Biggs	Jake Hoffman	Charlie Kirk	Jack McCain	Karrin Taylor Robson	Kimberly Yee	Other	Undecided
Noble Predictive Insights	May 12–16, 2025	426 (RV)	± 4.8%	17%	–	17%	–	24%	6%	–	37%
Noble Predictive Insights	February 11–13, 2025	374 (RV)	± 5.1%	14%	1%	14%	8%	11%	5%	–	47%
NicoPAC (R)	January 24–26, 2025	512 (RV)	± 4.3%	59%	–	–	–	9%	11%	3% (Note: Tom Hatten with 2%; Scott Neely with 1%)	19%
Data Orbital (Note: Poll sponsored by AZ Free News)	January 18–20, 2025	500 (LV)	± 4.5%	32%	–	–	–	12%	7%	4% (Note: "Refused" with 4%)	45%

Andy Biggs vs. Kimberly Yee

Poll source	Date(s) administered	Sample size	Margin of error	Andy Biggs	Kimberly Yee	Other	Undecided
NicoPAC (R)	January 24–26, 2025	512 (RV)	± 4.3%	67%	19%	–	14%

Karrin Taylor Robson vs. Kimberly Yee

Poll source	Date(s) administered	Sample size	Margin of error	Karrin Taylor Robson	Kimberly Yee	Other	Undecided
NicoPAC (R)	January 24–26, 2025	512 (RV)	± 4.3%	15%	41%	–	43%

=== Results ===
Primary results by county: Biggs: 60–70%; 70–80%

Republican primary results
Party	Candidate	Votes	%
Republican	Andy Biggs	453,819	74.0
Republican	David Schweikert	88,284	14.4
Republican	Scott Neely	42,871	7.0
Republican	Ken Miceli	28,026	4.6
Total votes		613,000	100.0

== No Labels primary ==
=== Candidates ===
==== Nominee ====
- Teri Hourihan, therapist

==== Eliminated in primary ====
- Hugh Lytle, health care entrepreneur

=== Results ===
Primary results by county: Hourihan: 50–60%; 60–70%; 70–80%; Lytle: 50–60%

No Labels primary results
Party	Candidate	Votes	%
No Labels	Teri Hourihan	5,596	56.1
No Labels	Hugh Lytle	4,384	43.9
Total votes		9,980	100.0

=== Running mate selection ===
Hourihan announced on August 6 that Angela Harrolle Mohan, a real estate broker, would serve as her running mate.

== Libertarian primary ==
=== Candidates ===
==== Failed to qualify ====
- Barry Hess, businessman and perennial candidate (Note: Nominee for Governor of Arizona in 2002, 2006, 2010, and 2014, 2018, and 2022; nominee for U.S. Senate in 2000, and write-in candidate in 2018 and 2020)

== Green primary ==
=== Background ===
The Green Party of Arizona disavowed candidate Risa Lombardo, accusing her of being a Republican running to draw votes from Katie Hobbs. Lombardo, a former precinct committee member for the Arizona Republican Party and wife of a Republican activist, denied the accusations. Her campaign received services from firms and attorneys with connections to Republicans. The party supported a write-in candidate in the July 21st primary, but Lombardo obtained the nomination.

In early September, it was reported that the Arizona Attorney General’s Office was investigating allegations that Lombardo's campaign, among others, had used fraudulent donations with falsified voter information to obtain public funding.

=== Candidates ===
==== Nominee ====
- Risa Lombardo, former Arizona Republican Party precinct committee member

==== Eliminated in primary ====
- Athena Eastwood, nominee for Arizona's 6th congressional district in 2024 (write-in)
- Carlos Melendez (write-in)
- William Pounds, streamer/recording artist and candidate for governor in 2022 (write-in)

==== Failed to qualify ====
- Lisa Castillo

=== Endorsements ===
Carlos Melendez (write-in)

Political parties

- Green Party of Arizona
William Pounds (write-in)

U.S. representatives

- Cynthia McKinney, former GA-11 (1993–2003) and 2008 presidential nominee of the Green Party

=== Results ===
Green primary results
Party	Candidate	Votes	%
Green	Risa Lombardo	430	67.2
Green	Carlos Melendez (write-in)	202	31.6
Green	Athena Eastwood (write-in)	4	0.6
Green	William Pounds (write-in)	4	0.6
Total votes		640	100.0

== General election ==
=== Predictions ===
Source	Ranking	As of
The Cook Political Report	Likely D	October 29, 2026
Decision Desk HQ	Likely D	November 3, 2026
Fox News	Lean D	November 1, 2026
Inside Elections	Tilt D	October 29, 2026
NBC News	Likely D	November 3, 2026
RealClearPolitics	Lean D	November 1, 2026
Sabato's Crystal Ball	Likely D	November 2, 2026
Silver Bulletin	Solid D	November 3, 2026

=== Post-primary endorsements ===
Katie Hobbs (D)

Executive branch officials

- Barack Obama, 44th president of the United States (2009–2017)

Labor unions

- AFL-CIO Arizona
- Arizona Education Association
- Communications Workers of America District 7
- United Mine Workers of America COMPAC Council

Organizations

- Everytown for Gun Safety
- Human Rights Campaign
- Humane World Action Fund
Andy Biggs (R)

Statewide officials

- Jan Brewer, former governor of Arizona (2009–2015)
- Doug Ducey, former governor of Arizona (2015–2023)

State legislators

- Lisa Fink, HD-27 (2025–present)

=== Fundraising ===
Campaign finance reports as of November 1, 2026
Candidate	Raised	Spent	Cash on hand
Katie Hobbs (D)	$15,044,057	$17,793,857	$671,892
Andy Biggs (R)	$5,761,491	$5,254,468	$507,023
Source: See the Money

=== Debate ===
A debate was held on October 6 featuring Republican nominee Andy Biggs and No Labels nominee Teri Ann Hourihan. Governor Hobbs declined to attend. Green Party nominee Risa Lombardo had agreed to participate, but reversed course shortly before the debate.

2026 Arizona gubernatorial debate
No.	Date	Host	Moderator	Link	Democratic	Republican	Green	No Labels
Key: P Participant A Absent N Not invited I Invited W Withdrawn								
Key: P Participant A Absent N Not invited I Invited W Withdrawn					Hobbs	Biggs	Lombardo	Hourihan
1	Oct. 6, 2026	Clean Elections	Steve Goldstein; Danielle Lerner	YouTube	A	P	A	P

=== Polling ===
Aggregate polls

Source of poll aggregation	Dates administered	Dates updated	Katie Hobbs (D)	Andy Biggs (R)	Other/ Undecided	Margin
270toWin	August 18 – October 8, 2026	October 23, 2026	49.3%	38.8%	11.9%	Hobbs +10.5%
Decision Desk HQ	through October 20, 2026	October 23, 2026	50.6%	43.8%	5.6%	Hobbs +6.8%
FiftyPlusOne	through October 20, 2026	October 23, 2026	49.6%	41.9%	8.5%	Hobbs +7.7%
RealClearPolitics	July 26 – October 8, 2026	October 23, 2026	49.4%	38.0%	12.6%	Hobbs +11.4%
Silver Bulletin	through October 20, 2026	October 23, 2026	50.0%	40.2%	9.8%	Hobbs +9.8%
Average			49.8%	40.5%	9.7%	Hobbs +9.3%

Poll source	Date(s) administered	Sample size	Margin of error	Katie Hobbs (D)	Andy Biggs (R)	Other	Undecided
GrayHouse (R) (Note: Poll commissioned by the campaign of Elijah Norton, the Republican candidate running for state treasurer)	October 28–29, 2026	500 (LV)	± 4.2%	50%	45%	—	—
Noble Predictive Insights	October 26–28, 2026	511 (LV)	± 4.3%	51%	45%	1% (Note: Hourihan (NL) with 1%; Lombardo (G) with <1%)	3%
HighGround, Inc.	October 21–25, 2026	400 (LV)	± 4.9%	52%	39%	3% (Note: Hourihan (NL) with 2%; Lombardo (G) with 1%; "Some other candidate" with <1%)	6%
RedBox Research (D) (Note: Poll sponsored by A Fight Worth Having)	October 20–23, 2026	2,686 (LV)	± 3.7%	47%	42%	4% (Note: "Someone else" with 2.5%; Teri Hourihan (NL) with 1.5%; Risa Lombardo (G) with <1%)	5%
GrayHouse (R)	October 18–20, 2026	550 (LV)	± 4.2%	51%	45%	2% (Note: Teri Hourihan (NL) with 2%; Risa Lombardo (G) with <1%)	2%
HighGround, Inc.	October 6–8, 2026	400 (LV)	± 4.9%	51%	34%	5% (Note: Hourihan (NL) with 3%; Lombardo (G) with 1%; "Some other candidate" with 1%)	10%
GrayHouse (R)	October 6–8, 2026	550 (LV)	± 4.2%	50%	44%	2% (Note: Teri Hourihan (NL) with 1%; Risa Lombardo (G) with 1%)	4%
Wick (R)	October 3–6, 2026	1,513 (LV)	± 2.6%	49%	43%	3% (Note: "Someone else" with 3%)	5%
GQR (D) (Note: Poll commissioned by Hobbs' campaign)	September 30 – October 5, 2026	600 (LV)	—	49%	45%	3% (Note: Teri Hourihan (NL) with 2%; Risa Lombardo (G) with 1%)	4%
Lake Research Partners (D) (Note: Poll sponsored by the Ballot Initiative Strategy Center.)	September 16–30, 2026	600 (RV)	—	56%	33%	2%	8%
Equis Research	September 1–9, 2026	1,214 (RV)	± 3.2%	49%	43%	—	8%
Arizona State University	August 18 – September 4, 2026	1,300 (RV)	± 2.7%	47%	34%	3% (Note: Hourihan (NL) with 2%; Lombardo (G) with 1%)	16%
NextGen Polling (R)	August 17–19, 2026	1,627 (LV)	± 2.6%	39%	38%	2% (Note: Teri Hourihan (NL) & Risa Lombardo (G) with 1%)	22%
Quantus Insights (R)	August 14–17, 2026	780 (LV)	± 4.1%	49%	43%	2% (Note: "Someone else" with 2%)	6%
Kreate Strategies (R) (Note: Poll sponsored by American Encore, which supports the Republican Party.)	August 13–16, 2026	900 (LV)	± 3.3%	45%	40%	3%	13%
Stealth Analytics	August 11–13, 2026	530 (LV)	± 4.3%	43%	38%	1%	18%
Noble Predictive Insights	August 10–13, 2026	923 (LV)	± 3.2%	48%	35%	4% (Note: Teri Hourihan (NL) with 1%; Risa Lombardo (G) with 2%; "Another candidate not listed" with 1%)	12%
Noble Predictive Insights	August 10–13, 2026	1,040 (RV)	± 3.0%	46%	32%	6% (Note: Teri Hourihan (NL) with 2%; Risa Lombardo (G) with 2%; "Another candidate not listed" with 2%)	16%
Grayhouse (R)	August 9–11, 2026	600 (LV)	± 4.0%	49%	45%	—	6%
The Tarrance Group (R) (Note: Poll sponsored by the Democracy Defense Foundation, a 501(c)(3) organization, led by former Governor Jan Brewer.)	July 27–30, 2026	600 (LV)	± 4.1%	52%	48%	–	–
Fabrizio Ward (R)/ Impact Research (D) (Note: Poll sponsored by AARP)	July 26–28, 2026	913 (LV)	± 3.2%	52%	44%	0%	4%
	July 21, 2026	Primary elections					
Noble Predictive Insights	May 5–7, 2026	996 (RV)	± 3.1%	41%	37%	6% (Note: Hugh Lytle (I) with 5%; "A third-party candidate not listed" with 1%)	16%
TIPP Insights (R) (Note: Poll sponsored by League of American Workers)	April 20–24, 2026	1,159 (LV)	± 3.2%	48%	38%	2%	12%
TIPP Insights (R)	April 20–24, 2026	1,501 (RV)	± 2.8%	45%	35%	2%	18%
Noble Predictive Insights	February 23–26, 2026	1,023 (RV)	± 3.1%	42%	35%	5% (Note: "Third-Party" with 5%)	18%
Center for Excellence in Polling	January 22–24, 2026	519 (LV)	± 4.3%	50%	41%	–	9%
NextGen Polling (R)	December 15–17, 2025	2,725 (LV)	± 1.9%	51%	32%	7%	9%
Emerson College	November 8–10, 2025	850 (RV)	± 3.3%	44%	43%	–	13%
Noble Predictive Insights	August 11–18, 2025	948 (RV)	± 3.2%	39%	37%	4% (Note: "Third party candidate" with 4%)	20%
Noble Predictive Insights	May 12–16, 2025	1,026 (RV)	± 3.1%	40%	38%	5% (Note: "A third party candidate" with 5%)	17%
Pulse Decision Science (R)	April 6–9, 2025	501 (LV)	± 4.4%	46%	42%	–	12%
Noble Predictive Insights	February 11–13, 2025	1,006 (RV)	± 3.1%	40%	38%	5%	17%
Kreate Strategies (R)	February 5–7, 2025	924 (LV)	± 3.0%	43%	44%	–	13%

Hypothetical polling

Katie Hobbs vs. David Schweikert

Poll source	Date(s) administered	Sample size	Margin of error	Katie Hobbs (D)	David Schweikert (R)	Other	Undecided
Noble Predictive Insights	May 5–7, 2026	996 (RV)	± 3.1%	42%	35%	7% (Note: Hugh Lytle (I) with 6%; "A third-party candidate not listed" with 1%)	16%
Noble Predictive Insights	February 23–26, 2026	1,023 (RV)	± 3.1%	44%	35%	5%	16%
Center for Excellence in Polling	January 22–24, 2026	519 (LV)	± 4.3%	51%	38%	–	11%
Emerson College	November 8–10, 2025	850 (RV)	± 3.3%	44%	39%	–	17%

Katie Hobbs vs. Karrin Taylor Robson

Poll source	Date(s) administered	Sample size	Margin of error	Katie Hobbs (D)	Karrin Taylor Robson (R)	Other	Undecided
Center for Excellence in Polling	January 22–24, 2026	519 (LV)	± 4.3%	50%	40%	–	10%
NextGen Polling (R)	December 15–17, 2025	2,725 (LV)	± 1.9%	51%	30%	9%	10%
Emerson College	November 8–10, 2025	850 (RV)	± 3.3%	43%	42%	–	15%
Noble Predictive Insights	August 11–18, 2025	948 (RV)	± 3.2%	40%	38%	4%	18%
Noble Predictive Insights	May 12–16, 2025	1,026 (RV)	± 3.1%	41%	39%	3% (Note: "A third party candidate" with 3%)	17%
Pulse Decision Science (R)	April 6–9, 2025	501 (LV)	± 4.4%	47%	38%	–	15%
Noble Predictive Insights	February 11–13, 2025	1,006 (RV)	± 3.1%	43%	35%	4%	18%
Kreate Strategies (R)	February 5–7, 2025	924 (LV)	± 3.0%	40%	38%	–	22%

Katie Hobbs vs. Charlie Kirk

Poll source	Date(s) administered	Sample size	Margin of error	Katie Hobbs (D)	Charlie Kirk (R)	Other	Undecided
Noble Predictive Insights	February 11–13, 2025	1,006 (RV)	± 3.1%	39%	36%	7%	18%

Katie Hobbs vs. Jake Hoffman

Poll source	Date(s) administered	Sample size	Margin of error	Katie Hobbs (D)	Jake Hoffman (R)	Other	Undecided
Noble Predictive Insights	February 11–13, 2025	1,006 (RV)	± 3.1%	40%	35%	5%	20%

Katie Hobbs vs. Jack McCain

Poll source	Date(s) administered	Sample size	Margin of error	Katie Hobbs (D)	Jack McCain (R)	Other	Undecided
Noble Predictive Insights	February 11–13, 2025	1,006 (RV)	± 3.1%	37%	36%	6%	21%

Katie Hobbs vs. Kimberly Yee

Poll source	Date(s) administered	Sample size	Margin of error	Katie Hobbs (D)	Kimberly Yee (R)	Other	Undecided
Noble Predictive Insights	February 11–13, 2025	1,006 (RV)	± 3.1%	40%	34%	6%	20%

Katie Hobbs vs. generic Republican

Poll source	Date(s) administered	Sample size	Margin of error	Katie Hobbs (D)	Generic Republican	Undecided
GrayHouse (R)	October 26–28, 2025	744 (RV)	± 3.6%	40%	44%	16%

Katie Hobbs vs. someone else

Poll source	Date(s) administered	Sample size	Margin of error	Katie Hobbs (D)	Someone else	Undecided
GrayHouse (R)	October 26–28, 2025	744 (RV)	± 3.6%	43%	48%	9%

=== Results ===
2026 Arizona gubernatorial election
Party	Candidate	Votes	%	±%
Democratic	Katie Hobbs (incumbent); John Giles	1,434,813	55.67%	+5.35%
Republican	Andy Biggs; Sine Kerr	1,094,388	42.46%	−7.19%
Green	Risa Lombardo; Lisa Castillo	24,644	0.96%	N/A
No Labels	Teri Ann Hourihan; Angela Harrolle Mohan	23,520	0.91	N/A
Write-in		18	0.00	
Total votes		2,577,383	100.0	
Democratic hold				

==== By congressional district ====
Hobbs won seven congressional districts, including two that elected Republicans, while Biggs won two.

District	Hobbs	Biggs	Elected Representative
1st	55.18%	43.65%	Amish Shah
2nd	49.19%	48.54%	Eli Crane
3rd	82.19%	15.57%	Yassamin Ansari
4th	62.63%	35.44%	Greg Stanton
5th	49.00%	49.42%	Mark Lamb
6th	56.52%	41.62%	JoAnna Mendoza
7th	71.84%	25.46%	Adelita Grijalva
8th	50.18%	48.08%	Abraham Hamadeh
9th	43.53%	54.59%	Paul Gosar

== Analysis ==
=== Exit poll ===
2026 Arizona gubernatorial election (CNN)
Demographic subgroup	Hobbs	Biggs	% of total vote
Ideology
Liberals	96	3	23
Moderates	75	23	40
Conservatives	9	89	37
Party
Democrats	98	2	30
Republicans	10	88	33
Independents	62	34	37
Donald Trump job approval
Approve	5	93	40
Disapprove	90	8	60
2024 presidential vote
Kamala Harris	99	1	47
Donald Trump	10	88	46
Another candidate	58	27	2
Did not vote	75	21	4
Gender
Men	54	45	47
Women	57	41	52
Income
$100,000 or more	58	41	42
$50,000-$99,999	54	43	30
Less than $50,000	54	44	28
Race/ethnicity
White	53	46	72
Latino	60	36	17
Black	90	9	3
All other voters	52	46	8
White born-again or evangelical Christian?
Yes	18	82	14
No	62	36	86
Race by gender
White men	52	47	34
White women	54	45	37
Latino men	53	43	8
Latina women	66	30	9
All other voters	59	39	11
Age
18–29 years old	72	25	9
30–44 years old	52	45	18
45-64 years old	58	40	33
65 and older	52	47	41
Area type
Urban	66	32	22
Suburban	57	41	53
Rural	43	55	25
Education
College graduate	66	33	44
No college degree	48	50	56
Education by race
White college graduates	65	34	34
Non-white college graduates	70	28	10
Whites without college	43	56	38
Non-whites without college	59	37	18
Education by gender and race
White women with college degrees	67	32	18
White women without college degrees	41	57	20
White men with college degrees	61	38	16
White men without college degrees	44	55	18
Voters of color	63	34	29
Educational attainment
Advanced degree	70	29	19
Bachelor's degree	63	36	25
Associate's degree	53	45	12
Some college	50	48	22
Never attended college	42	55	22

== See also ==
- 2026 United States gubernatorial elections
- 2026 Arizona elections

== Notes ==
Partisan clients
