= Independent Republican Party =

Independent Republican Party may refer to:

- Independent Republican Party (Cuba)
- Independent Republican (Ireland)
- Independent Republicans of France
- Independent Republican (United States)
- Independent-Republican Party of Minnesota 1975-95 (United States)
- Independent Republican Party (Turkey)
