= Technical Group of Independents =

Technical Groups of Independents may refer to:

- Technical Group of Independents (1979–1984) in the European Parliament
- Technical Group of Independents (1999–2001) in the European Parliament
- Technical group of small parties and independents in Dáil Éireann, Ireland
