= Independent Liberal Party =

The Independent Liberal Party is the name of more than one political party:

- Independent Liberal Party (Chile)
- Independent Liberal Party (Kosovo), a Serbian political party in Kosovo
- Independent Liberal Party (Nicaragua), a Nicaraguan political party separated from Somoza's Nationalist Liberal Party (PLN) in 1944, and formed in 1947
- Independent Liberal Party (Trinidad and Tobago)
- Independent Liberals (Israel), a political party in Israel between the 1960s and 1980s
- Independent Liberal Party (UK, 1918)
- Independent Liberals (UK, 1931)

== See also ==
- Liberal Party
