= Independent Labour Party (disambiguation) =

The Independent Labour Party was a socialist political party in Britain.

Independent Labour Party may also refer to:

- Scottish Trades Councils Independent Labour Party, a forerunner of the British ILP
- Independent Labor Party, a party in Burundi
- Independent Labour Party (India), a former party in India during British colonial rule
- Independent Labour Party (Jamaica)
- Independent Labour Group, a former party in Northern Ireland
- Independent Labour Party, several parties which have existed in Canada—see Labour candidates and parties in Canada—including:
  - Independent Labour Party (Manitoba, 1895)
  - Independent Labour Party (Manitoba, 1920)
- Transvaal Independent Labour Party, a former party in the Transvaal Colony

== See also ==
- Independent Labor (Australia), an affiliation in Australia
- Independent Labor Group, a grouping in Australia from 1959 until 1977
- Labour Independent Group, a British group in the 1940s
