= Independent National Party =

Independent National Party can refer to:

- Independent National Party (Croatia), a defunct political party in the Kingdom of Croatia
- Independent National Party (Luxembourg), political party in Luxembourg
- Greenback Party, political party in the United States
- Independent National Party (Uruguay), a defunct Uruguayan political party

== See also ==
- National Independent Party (disambiguation)
- National Rally of Independents, political party in Morocco
