= No Labels Party of Arizona =

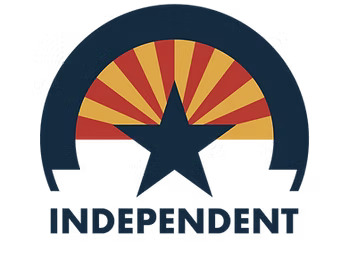
- Chairperson: Paul Johnson
- Founded: 2023; 3 years ago

Website
- arizonaindependentparty.com

The No Labels Party of Arizona is the third largest political party in the U.S. state of Arizona. Despite its name, the party, founded in 2023, has not been affiliated with the national No Labels organization since 2025. The party is chaired by Paul Johnson, the former mayor of Phoenix. Johnson, and other proponents of Proposition 140, which would have created a nonpartisan primary, took over the No Labels Party in 2025 and attempted to rename it the Arizona Independent Party. Their intention is for it to be a vehicle for Independents to gain ballot access.

Immediately after the name change took effect on December 1, 2025, the Arizona Citizens Clean Elections Commission filed a lawsuit challenging the name change. They said the new name would confuse voters. The Arizona Democratic and Republican parties also sued to block the new name. On March 25, 2026, a judge ruled that the party name change was invalid. The party planned to appeal. However, no appeal was filed during the 2026 election cycle, and the party website used the name No Labels Party. An appeal was filed in November 2026.

On November 6, 2025, a partnership was announced with the Forward Party.

== History ==
The national No Labels organization was founded on December 13, 2010, with the slogan "Not Left. Not Right. Forward."

No Labels intended to offer its ballot line to a "unity ticket" in the 2024 presidential election, as an "insurance policy" in the event that "both major parties nominate presidential candidates that the vast majority of Americans don’t want". In November 2023, No Labels' chief strategist, Ryan Clancy, stated that "Based on the conditions as they are, we expect to be putting up a ticket early next year". By January 2024, No Labels had ballot access in 16 states: Alaska, Arizona, Arkansas, Colorado, Florida, Hawaii, Kansas, Maine, Maryland, Mississippi, Montana, Nevada, North Carolina, Oregon, South Dakota, and Utah. No Labels additionally achieved ballot access in Delaware, Nebraska, North Dakota, Wisconsin, Rhode Island, Tennessee, Wyoming, Alabama, and Louisiana, bringing the total number of states with No Labels ballot access to 25 states. However, On April 4, 2024, the organization ended its effort to run a presidential ticket for the 2024 election.

As of the fall of 2023, over 15,000 Arizona residents had chosen to register their party affiliation as No Labels, more than the margin of victory in the 2020 presidential election in Arizona.

After No Labels attained recognition, perennial candidate Richard Grayson opted to run under the No Labels banner. No Labels then sued the Arizona Secretary of State, Democrat Adrian Fontes, to prevent candidates it did not approve from running under the No Labels banner on its ballot line. U.S. District Court Judge John Tuchi ruled in No Labels' favor.

By April 2025, over 36,000 Arizonans had registered as No Labels voters, making it the state's third largest party.

In the 2025 special election in Arizona's 7th Congressional District, the Secretary of State permitted Grayson to run as a write-in candidate in the July 15 No Labels Party primary. Just four days before that primary, on July 11, 2025, the United States Court of Appeals for the Ninth Circuit reversed the District Court's 2024 opinion, saying that No Labels had no right to tell the Secretary of State to block anyone from filing for partisan office in the No Labels primary. Grayson won the primary with one write-in vote and advanced to the special general election.

By July 2025, the new chair of the Arizona No Labels Party, former Phoenix Mayor Paul Johnson, announced that after the Ninth Circuit ruling, the state party, with nearly 40,000 members, would open itself up to independent candidates up and down the ballot. “We believe that an open primary and more people participating is to our advantage, and we’re going to look for candidates and for people who believe that, who believe civility matters, decency matters, and focusing on the big issues matter,” Johnson said. In response, the national No Labels organization issued a statement that said, "No Labels has no ongoing involvement with the Arizona state party. A group of local Arizonans is leading this effort without any affiliation with No Labels. They will change the state party’s name and be responsible for all aspects of the state party’s operations moving forward."

On October 24, 2025, the party announced it would be rebranding as the Arizona Independent Party to better appeal to independent and undecided voters. Despite this name change being approved by the Arizona Secretary of State, the state Republican, and Democratic parties jointly sued to block the name change arguing that No Labels was trying to "bait and switch" voters. The Arizona Superior Court ruled that the name change was illegal, as there is no legal mechanism in Arizona state law for a party to change their name, stating that if the party wanted to appear on the ballot as the Arizona Independent Party, then they would both have to file as a new party, and achieve the required number voters to appear on the ballot again.

== 2026 election ==
Two candidates filed to run as the party's candidate for Arizona governor in the 2026 primary. Hugh Lytle, a businessman and former quarterback at Arizona State University, was endorsed by the party chair. Teri Hourihan is a therapist/counselor. Hourihan challenged Lytle's signatures to knock him off the primary ballot. A Democratic Party activist also filed suit to keep him off the ballot. On May 4, 2026, the Arizona Supreme Court gave final approval for Lytle to be on the ballot. The July 21 primary for governor was won by Teri Hourihan. The party also nominated candidates for two Congressional, two state senate and one state house seats.

However, among the winners of the party's primary, the Arizona No Labels Party endorsed only three state legislative candidates and otherwise endorsed a mix of Republican and Democratic candidates for various offices "as the best reflection of the party's values." The party pointedly did not endorse Hourihan, its gubernatorial nominee. In a September 9, 2026 podcast, party chairman Paul Johnson and candidate for governor Teri Ann Hourihan disagreed about the purpose of No Labels: Johnson saw it as a means to support independent candidates without the usual party infrastructure, and Hourihan said her vision for No Labels was closer to a third party.

== See also ==
- Independent Party of Oregon
