= George Truman =

George Truman may refer to:

- George Truman (cricketer) (1886–1955), Australian cricketer
- George E. Truman (1865–1929), American politician from Arizona
