= Mark Lamb (sheriff) =

American sheriff (born 1972)

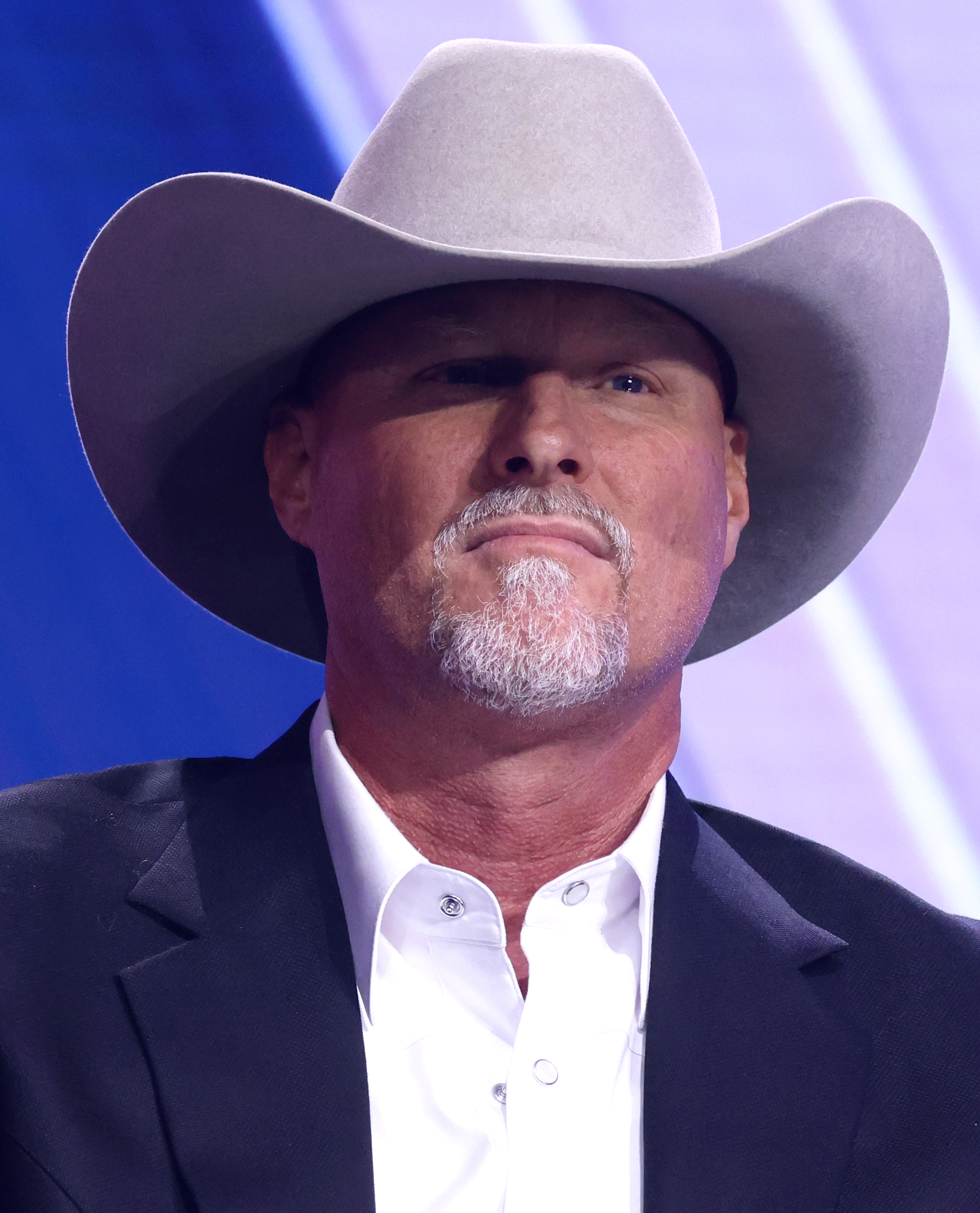
- Lamb in 2025

Member-elect of the U.S. House of Representatives from Arizona's 5th district
- Assuming office January 3, 2027
- Succeeding: Andy Biggs

Sheriff of Pinal County
- In office January 1, 2017 – December 31, 2024
- Preceded by: Paul Babeu
- Succeeded by: Ross Teeple

Personal details
- Born: July 14, 1972 (age 54) Hilo, Hawaii, U.S.
- Party: Republican
- Spouse: Janel DeRusha (m. 1994)
- Children: 5
- Website: Campaign website

Mark Lamb (born July 14, 1972) is an American law enforcement officer and politician who is the United States representative-elect from Arizona's 5th congressional district. Lamb served as sheriff of Pinal County, Arizona, from January 1, 2017, until December 31, 2024. He is a member of the Republican Party. Lamb previously served in the Salt River Pima–Maricopa Indian Community police department.

Lamb was born in Hawaii and lived in many different places during his childhood. After graduating from Chandler High School in Arizona, he moved to Utah to start a paintball business that later went into bankruptcy. He then worked in pest control. He began his career as a sheriff working for the police department of the Salt River Pima–Maricopa Indian Community for six years, before joining a county sheriff's office. In 2017, Lamb was elected sheriff of Pinal County in Arizona.

He ran unopposed for re-election as sheriff in 2020. He was a Republican candidate for the U.S. Senate in 2024 looking to replace incumbent independent Kyrsten Sinema after Sinema declined to seek re-election. He was defeated in the primary by Kari Lake, finishing second.

Lamb stepped down from the sheriff's office on December 31, 2024. He was succeeded by Ross Teeple, who took office on January 1, 2025. In July 2026, Lamb won the Republican nomination to represent Arizona's 5th congressional district in the United States House of Representatives, during which he was accused of sexual misconduct. Lamb subsequently defeated Democrat Elizabeth Lee in the general election.

== Early life and education ==
Mark Lamb was born on July 14, 1972 in Hilo, Hawaii one of Hawaii's biggest islands where he spent the first 11 years of his life. Lamb's father worked in International business which caused the family to move around a lot in his teenage years. Lamb then lived in Manila in the Philippine Islands where they lived for about one year before returning to the United States. Lamb also lived in other places such as Panama during his childhood. When returning from out of the country the family then settled in Chandler, Arizona. Lamb attended junior high there establishing his roots in the area. While attending Chandler High School Lamb's family moved to Panama, where he made the decision to stay in Arizona to finish school while traveling to Panama during summer break and Christmas holidays. Lamb was also in the country when the United States decided to use military intervention in 1989 which left a strong impression on him from then on.

Lamb graduated from Chandler High School in 1990 earning his diploma. Lamb did not attend college after high school and he instead went on his mission for his The Church of Jesus Christ of Latter-day Saints which his family was affiliated with. Lamb spent his two years in Argentina during his mission.

== Business career ==
Before he began his career in law enforcement, he worked in pest control. He moved back to Arizona in 2003, after his paintball business in Utah failed and he filed for bankruptcy. When Lamb graduated from high school he moved to Payson, Utah in 1990 and he opened a paintball business called Paintball Junkeez. In Lamb's 2020 book he wrote that the rise of online shopping and the opening of a Walmart nearby severely hurt his sales which led him to shut down the store and to file for bankruptcy in the year 2003. After Lamb's business he operated a small local business which focused on pest control and carpet cleaning before entering police academy when he was in his 30s.

Lamb also has been involved in many other ventures. He has opened many other business with media related technology He opened an American Sheriff streaming network where it is a subscription based network where you pay monthly for it which is $4.99 a month. This features police ride-alongs, and law enforcement stories from all across the United States. Lamb also has published a book and started his own podcast.

After lamb left office as Sheriff of Pinal County, Arizona he founded Ten 7 Consulting which is a membership-based platform to help retired law enforcement officers and military veterans transition into entrepreneurship. The company does offer guidance on forming LLC's, handing copyrights and managing small business taxes. Lamb also worked in the private sector as a consultant and advisor on border security, mental health and substance abuse including with private firms such as Atlas and Lamb also served as a law enforcement advisor for the Federation for American Immigration Reform.

== Law enforcement career ==
While in his early thirties Lamb decided to attend the Maricopa County Sheriff's Office deputy academy. Lamb graduated a few years later earning the title of Valedictorian. Lamb worked for the police department of the Salt River Pima–Maricopa Indian Community for six years. In 2012, he joined the Pinal County Sheriff's Office.

=== Tenure ===
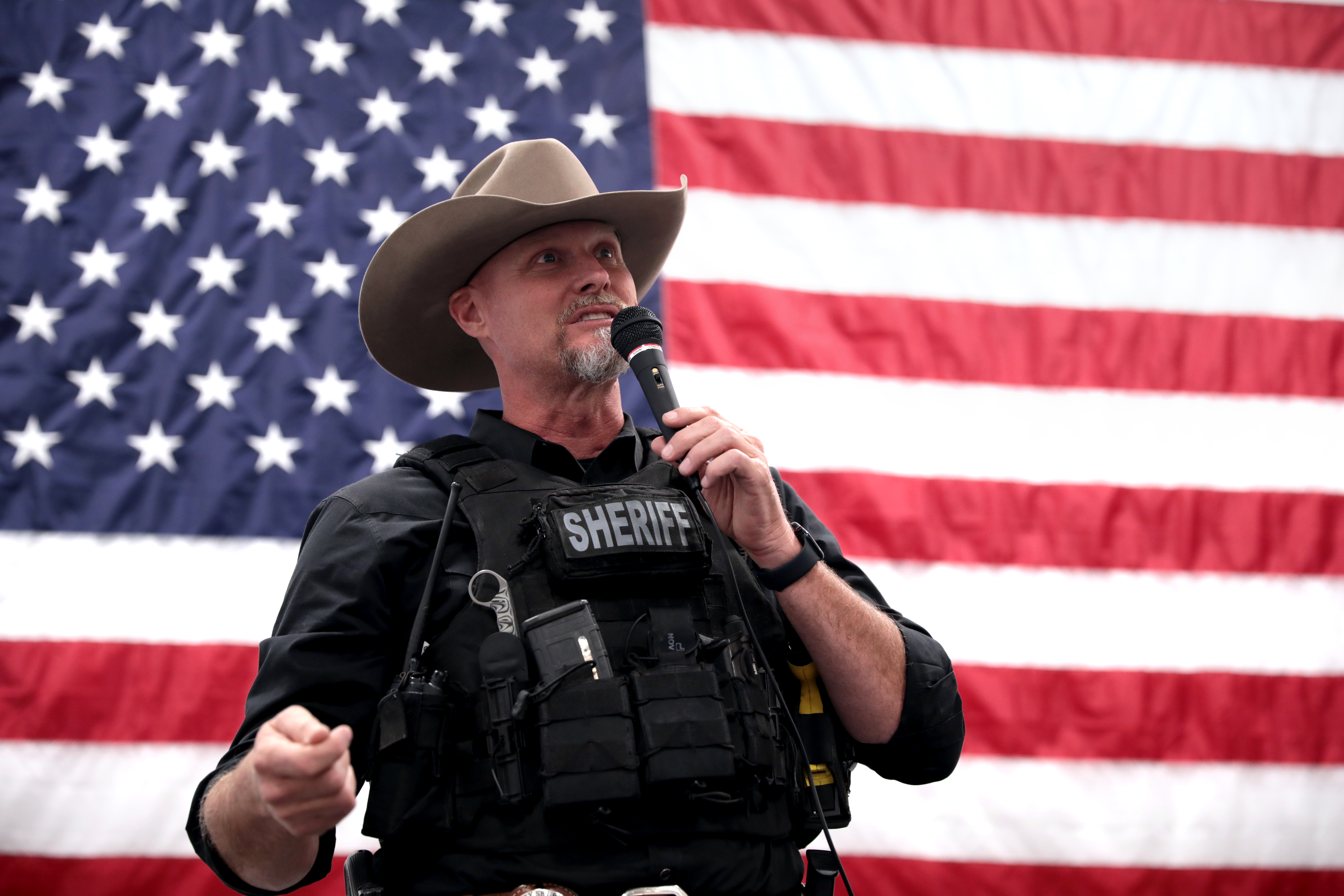
Lamb pictured wearing his sheriff uniform in 2022

In the year of 2006 Lamb joined the Salt River Police Department where he had put in six years of service he served on the SWAT team when he was in this position. Lamb also had participated in DUI and Gang Suppression Unit and he had investigated homicides, aggravated assaults and narcotics cases.

Lamb was then promoted to Detective while he was in the Gang enforcement Unit when he was alongside federal and localagencies which includes the Federal Bureau of Investigation, Bureau of Alcohol, Tobacco, Firearms and Explosives, United States Marshals Service and the Mesa Police Department. Lamb served as a lead detective on a task force which allowed a violent gang in East Valley in Arizona to be dismantled. Lamb then later transitioned to the Pinal County Sheriff's Office.

==== 2016 Sheriff of Pinal county election ====
Lamb announced that he was going to run for Sheriff of Pinal County to succeed Paul Babeu who was retiring to run for congress. Lamb faced fellow republican Steve Henry in the Primary election. Henry was endorsed by the outgoing Sheriff who he was Bapeu's deputy sheriff though with lamb's experience he easily defeated his challenger receiving 62% to Henry's 37%. Lamb faced democratic nominee Kaye Dickson in the general election. During the election Lamb emphasized that he was Pro life, Pro gun and that he was a defender of religious freedoms and Lamb had pledged to bring a business approach if elected sheriff.

He defeated Dickson in the general election receiving 57% of the vote compared to Dickson's 42%. lambs victory came when Republicans had a Red wave in the 2016 United States elections nationwide occurring all across the country.

== Early political career ==
=== Sheriff of Pinal County ===
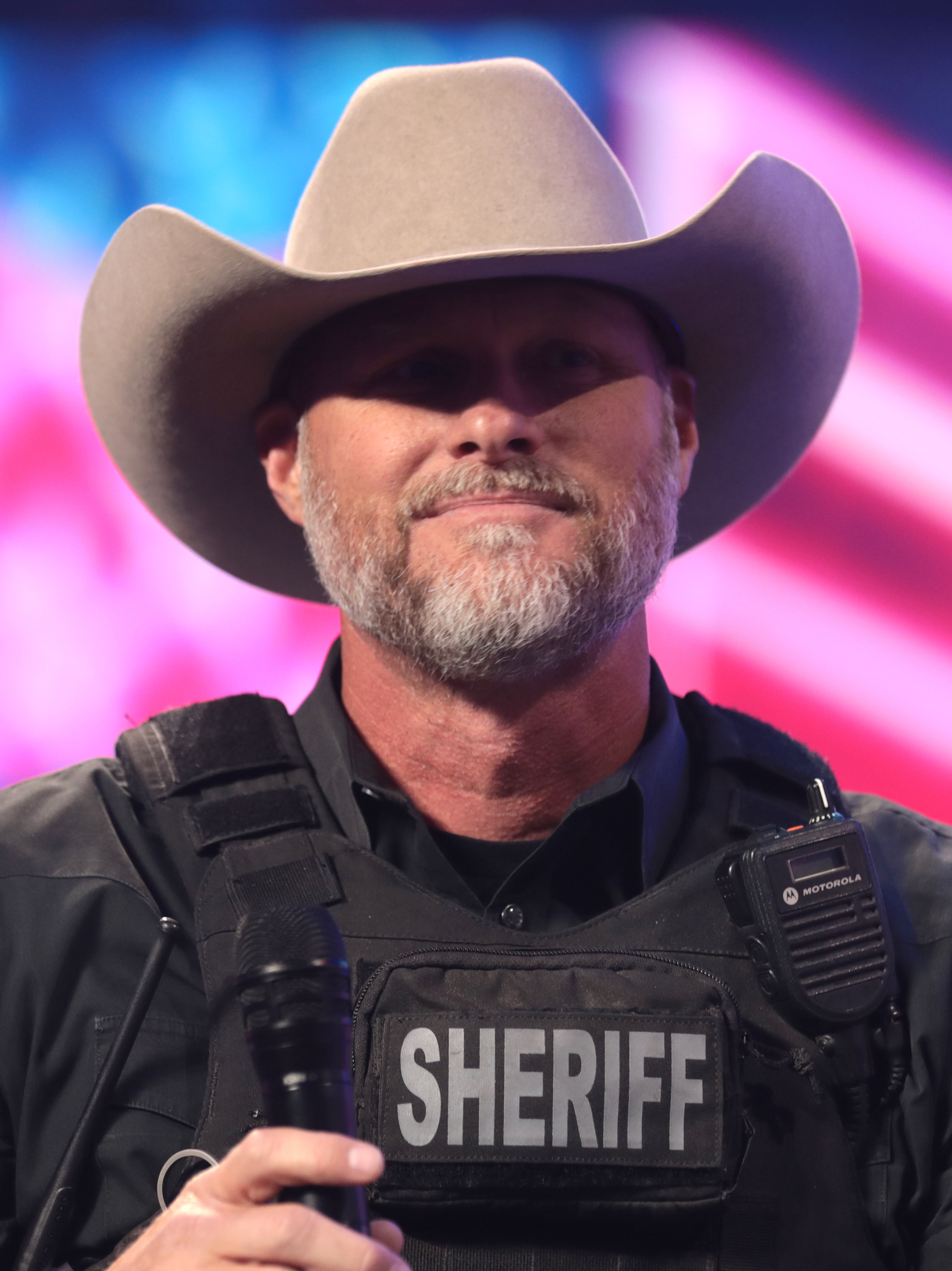
Lamb in 2021 at AmericaFest

Lamb speaking to attendees at an event in 2022

In 2017, Lamb was elected to succeed Paul Babeu as Pinal County sheriff.

Prior to its cancellation in 2020, Lamb frequently appeared on the TV series Live PD. He also hosted Live PD: Wanted, a spinoff show. In 2019, he also featured in Season 5 of 60 Days In, in which seven volunteers went undercover in the Pinal County Jail for 60 days to collect insight into jail operations. Lamb frequently appears on Fox News and Newsmax TV.

In November 2019, Lamb called for increased security along the Mexico–United States border to combat drug cartels from harming U.S. national parks.

In May 2020, Lamb stated he would not enforce a stay-at-home order during the COVID-19 pandemic, on the basis that he believed it was unconstitutional. In June 2020, he tested positive for COVID-19 a week before his scheduled appearance at the White House for Donald Trump's signing of executive order 13925.

In July 2020, in response to the protests following the murder of George Floyd, Lamb announced his intention to form a civilian posse of non-felon volunteers with four hours of training in legal guidelines and basic police tactics. No protests occurred in Pinal County in summer 2020.

In 2018, Lamb established the American Sheriff Foundation, a charity. In August 2020, The Arizona Republic reported that the charity had raised more than $50,000 but left at least $18,000 unaccounted for and filed largely blank tax filings. In 2024, the nonprofit lost its status and was dissolved after Lamb admitted to failing to follow Arizona laws that required disclosure of his past bankruptcy and not filing required reports, which was revealed when Open Records Requests filed by American Oversight went unfulfilled.

Lamb is a supporter of the Stop the Steal movement. Following the 2021 United States Capitol attack by supporters of Donald Trump, he spoke at a rally where he said the protest was not Trump's fault but rather caused by "the other issues that have happened – the Hillary Clintons that have gone unpunished". He later described the people as "very loving, Christian people."

In February 2021, Lamb co-founded (with Republican strategist Nathan Sproul and others) Protect America Now, a coalition of 69 sheriffs with the stated purpose of "educating Americans about how our Sheriffs and the law enforcement community are standing for our Constitution and law and order". In May 2021, he launched the American Sheriff Network, a subscription service providing videos showing sheriffs and their deputies carrying out their duties.

Lamb is the author of American Sheriff: Traditional Values in a Modern World, which was self-published.

=== 2024 U.S. Senate campaign ===
Lamb campaigning in Scottsdale, Arizona in May 2024

Results by county: Lake: 50–60%; 60–70%; Lamb: 50–60%; 60–70%

In December 2022, a spokesperson for Lamb said he was considering running for the U.S. Senate in 2024. In April 2023, Lamb announced he would run for the seat held by incumbent Democrat-turned Independent Kyrsten Sinema. He referenced his deceased son who struggled with drug addiction and he called for the U.S. military to eliminate the Mexican drug cartels similar to what had happened with ISIS.

During the campaign, both Lamb and his competitor in the primary Kari Lake, who was the Republican nominee in the 2022 Arizona gubernatorial election, levied attacks against each other. Lamb argued about Lake's lack of experience in managing government budgets and with upholding the rule of law. He also argued that she risked losing the general election, as she previously did in 2022 when running for Governor of Arizona. Lamb also criticized Lake for skipping a debate with him in June 2024, explaining that the debate is a job interview and how he would never hire anybody who would not show up. Lake referred to Lamb as a "total coward when it comes to Election integrity", a comment that was condemned by multiple Arizona sheriffs. Lake also labeled Lamb as a "Swamp rat," a "Deadbeat," and a "Nancy Pelosi with a beard." Lamb responded by saying Lake was a "known media journalist who has never won an election" while accusing her of twisting the truth. Lamb also questioned Lake's stances on abortion during the primary, sharing her changing views and shifting rhetoric on her anti-abortion stance.

Days before the primary, Lamb stated in an interview that the Friday before his signatures were due for the race, he received a phone call informing that he could be used on the campaign trial for Donald Trump's 2024 presidential campaign, speaking on key issues such as the Mexico–United States border. Lamb declined and said that the alleged Trump representative told Lamb he did not have "permission" to run. On this, Lamb reasoned, "I don't need permission to run. You know, what I need permission from is my wife. That's it. Or the people. That's who I need their permission for. If they sign my petition, that's their permission that I get to do this for them."

In July 2024, he was defeated in the Republican primary by Kari Lake, receiving 40% of the vote compared to Lake's 55% and Elizabeth Jean Reye's 5%. Lamb shared that losing the primary was a blessing which taught him to "surrender the outcome of politics", and also shared how the campaign prepared him for his later successful campaign in the United States House of Representatives in 2026.

=== Between tenures ===
After leaving office in 2025 Lamb remained politically active and remained a high profile with certain immigration groups, Conservative media circuits and private ventures. Lamb served as an law enforcement adviser for the Federation for American Immigration Reform (FAIR) where he had hosted the Border Podcast where he discussed his views on immigration enforcement and border policy. Lamb also remained a regular speaker in Arizona and National conservative events including many with Turning Point USA with its founder Charlie Kirk. Lamb also continued to make much media appearances including on Newsmax and others. Lamb also pursued a business venture in Tennessee while he was out of office which later grew scrutiny regarding his residency.

== U.S. House of Representatives ==
==== 2026 election ====
Lamb speaks with supporters during his congressional campaign

In October 2025, after incumbent representative Andy Biggs chose not to seek re-election and to run for governor of Arizona, Lamb entered the Republican primary to succeed Biggs, running on a platform of traditional values, demanding a "national revival of faith, family, freedom" and guns and denouncing "America's moral decay". Challenger Jay Feely dropped out of the race to run in Arizona's 1st congressional district instead. He faced fellow MAGA republican Daniel Keenan. He received the endorsements of President Donald Trump and Turning Point USA. In July 2026, amid multiple accusations of sexual misconduct and abuse of power that he denied, Lamb won the primary against self-funding businessman Daniel Keenan, with 58.5% of the vote to Keenan's 41.6%.

Multiple women accused Lamb of sending them explicit photos and sexually charged messages. Another woman said that he had threatened her with felony revenge porn charges if she posted about their relationship. The sexually charged messages are public records in Pinal County and were independently verified by the Arizona Republic and KTAR News 92.3 FM. Lamb did not deny any specific claims against him, but his campaign said that many claims were "baseless and harmful". The Pinal County Attorney's Office concluded a review of materials submitted to the Pinal County Board of Supervisors in 2020 and June 2026 with the finding of "no evidence that Lamb acted in a criminal manner".

While initially trailing on election night, Lamb won the general election receiving 51% of the popular vote to Elizabeth Lee's 48%. (Note: The race for Arizona's 5th congressional district in the 2026 United States House of Representatives elections in Arizona was officially called for Lamb on Friday, November 6, 2026 three days after the general election.) The race had tightened in recent days. Through Lamb's victory he will serve in the 120th United States Congress from 2027 until 2029. Lambs victory came when the state of Arizona voted Democratic in all the statewide offices and a majority in the U.S. House. Lamb became one of three new representatives for Arizona's delegation to Congress as well as Democrats, Amish Shah in Arizona's 1st congressional district and JoAnna Mendoza in Arizona's 6th congressional district who both flipped Republican seats.

==== Tenure ====
Lamb is scheduled to be sworn in on January 3, 2027.

The district, which was once represented by U.S. Senators John McCain and Jeff Flake, is in the heart of the East Valley and includes part of Mesa, most of Chandler, all of Queen Creek and all of Gilbert.

== Political positions ==
Lamb speaking at a Turning Point USA event in 2021 at Surprise, Arizona

Mark Lamb is affiliated with the Republican Party and campaigns on an America First agenda. Lamb is a part of the MAGA movement. Lamb represents a populist, law-and-order conservatism in modern American politics. Lamb opposes abortion and believes that there should be increased border security in the United States. Lamb also believes that there should be a strict limitation on government power in the U.S. by supporting an act to add Congressional term limits to slow the rise of government power. Lamb's economic agenda focuses on lowering taxes for the working class in the United States.

=== Border ===
Lamb has stated that his number one key issue to work on in Congress is the border. During his eight-year tenure as Sheriff of Pinal County, Arizona this was also Lamb's number one issue. Lamb stated while in Congress he wants to work in order to put border policies into permanent federal laws which cannot be reversed by future administrations. Lamb as well as newly elected Democratic congresswoman and former Marine JoAnna Mendoza have both pledged to work with each other on the border and to find some common ground. On November 15, 2026, days after his election win to Congress, Lamb stated that "you cannot have a good country if you do not have secure borders" and urged Trump to continue the deportation in the second Trump administration. Lamb opposes amnesty programs and says that illegal entry leads to ongoing lawbreaking in a country and creates public health issues. Lamb has stated that he wants to focus first on illegals who are in the country who have committed further crimes against United States citizens.

==== Local policing and ICE cooperation ====
Lamb opposes sanctuary cities policies, saying that restricting communication between local police and United States Immigration and Customs Enforcement people creates safety risks for communities and law enforcement. Lamb favors legislation holding sanctuary cities accountable for refusing to cooperate with ICE. He supports ending immunity to judges and elected officials whose decisions create harm in the United States. Lamb rejects many calls made to abolish ICE advocating for strong federal support and "effective oversight" and "responsible reform."

=== Abortion ===
Lamb is pro-life and states that a human life begins at conception. Lamb's platform opposes federal abortion funding and supports having abortion law in the United States by state with the people choosing rather than having federal laws. Lamb supports prohibiting taxpayers' dollars from directly or indirectly funding any organizations which allow abortion. Lamb praised the Supreme Court of the United States ruling on overturning Roe v. Wade returning abortion regulations back to the states instead of to the federal government.

Lamp opposed Arizona's Arizona ballot proposition 139 which established the right to abortion in the state of Arizona. Lamb argued that the amendment went to far with allowing abortions late into the pregnancy. He also claimed that it would allow for sex traffickers to obtain abortions for those underage without notifying parents or law enforcement.

=== Donald Trump ===
Lamb speaking at at Trump rally in Arizona for the 2024 United States presidential election

Lamb is a staunch supporter of President Donald Trump supporting him in the 2016, 2020 and 2024 United States presidential elections. Lamb is involved in his America First agenda and the MAGA movement Lamb was endorsed by Donald Trump in his 2026 congressional campaign being called a "MAGA WARRIOR" by Trump. Trump's endorsement is credited to why lamb won the primary. Lamb was present with Trump and other Republicans at a rally in October 2026 where Lamb contrasted Trump's presidency and leadership with globalist agendas. He credited Trump's policies with creating a period of lower costs, energy independence and international stability. Also at the rally Lamb urged his supporters and the voters to support Trump to restore national safety and restore the Southern border with Trump's decision to take the country back.

Following the 2026 United States elections Lamb shard that Trump must continue the path of removing Illegal immigrants in the country warning that the incoming Democrats will try to reverse all his policies made during his presidency. Lamb urged Congress to vote to remove illegals who have committed further crimes in the country.

=== Election results ===
Lamb is a staunch supporter of the Stop the steal movement in Trumps involvement to Attempts to overturn the 2020 United States presidential election after Joe Biden was declared the winner. Lamb supported Trump's decision in challenging the results of the election. During a 2022 rally Lamb said "Sheriffs are going to enforce the law... We will not let happen what happened in 2020." Lamb faced criticism for a remark he made in 2020 where he said there was zero evidence of fraud which he later reversed this claim.

==== SAVE America Act ====
Lamb strongly supports the SAVE America Act and he urges Congress to get the legislation passed which will require proof that you are a U.S. citizen by showing photo identification to cast a ballot in federal elections. On July 23, 2026, Lamb posted a video calling for members to vote for the legislation. Lamb characterizes the bill as a "common sense measure" needed to prevent voter fraud and prevent Illegal immigrants from voting in elections. Lamb criticized the United States Senate for stalling the legislation and not working harder to get it passed. In April 2026 while at a Turning Point USA event Trump recognized Lamb for his work in trying to get the bill passed.

== Personal life ==
Lamb met his wife Janel in 1993 while at a church dance at Arizona State University. The day after the dance Lamb called her and they immediately started dating. After dating for two weeks Lamb moved to Panama to help his parents. Lamb returned the following year in March and two weeks after his return the two got engaged in the first week of April. They married the following year on September 23, 1994. The two have five children together, Cade, Sadie, Cooper, Wyatt and Dayton. Lamb's wife, Janel Lamb, is the author of a book titled The Sheriff's Wife, and frequently appears alongside him at public events.

Lamb wearing his iconic cowboy hat

In 2022 on December 16 just days before Christmas Lamb's son, Cooper, daughter-in-law Caroline, and infant grand daughter Elaine passed away in a traffic collision in Gilbert, Arizona. Lambs son and grand daughter passed away at the scene while their daughter-in-law passed away a week later while being hospitalized. Lamb and his family held a memorial service. Lamb and his wife publicly forgave their sons killer who was arrested after the scene with signs of being drunk.

He is a member of the Church of Jesus Christ of Latter-day Saints.

Lamb and his wife's residency is in San Tan Valley, Arizona and he will live part time in Washington, D.C. when he is sworn into Congress. Lamb and his wife own a $3 million ranch in Tennessee which grew controversy over his residency during his congressional campaign.

Lamb wears a cowboy hat and is rarely ever seen not wearing the hat. Lamb owns a personal collection of the hats and often signs some and gives them away. The hat is called as part of Lambs American sheriff identity.

== Electoral history ==
Pinal County sheriff election, 2016, Republican primary results
| Party | Candidate | Votes | % |
|---|---|---|---|
| Republican | Mark Lamb | 17,723 | 62.21% |
| Republican | Steve Henry | 10,578 | 37.13% |
| Write-in | | 188 | 0.66% |
| Total votes | | 28,489 | 100.00% |

Pinal County sheriff election, 2016
| Party | Candidate | Votes | % |
|---|---|---|---|
| Republican | Mark Lamb | 72,039 | 57.90% |
| Democratic | Kaye Dickson | 52,060 | 41.84% |
| Write-in | | 324 | 0.26% |
| Total votes | | 124,423 | 100.00% |
| Republican hold | | | |

Pinal County sheriff election, 2020, Republican primary results
| Party | Candidate | Votes | % |
|---|---|---|---|
| Republican | Mark Lamb (incumbent) | 38,714 | 99.12% |
| Write-in | | 343 | 0.88% |
| Total votes | | 39,057 | 100.00% |

Pinal County sheriff election, 2020
| Party | Candidate | Votes | % |
|---|---|---|---|
| Republican | Mark Lamb (incumbent) | 141,325 | 97.29% |
| Write-in | | 3,933 | 2.71% |
| Total votes | | 145,258 | 100.00% |
| Republican hold | | | |

2024 United States Senate election in Arizona, Republican primary results
| Party | Candidate | Votes | % |
|---|---|---|---|
| Republican | Kari Lake | 405,837 | 55.4% |
| Republican | Mark Lamb | 289,407 | 39.5% |
| Republican | Elizabeth Jean Reye | 37,972 | 5.2% |
| Total votes | | 733,216 | 100.0% |

2026 Arizona's 5th congressional district election Republican primary results
| Party | Candidate | Votes | % |
|---|---|---|---|
| Republican | Mark Lamb | 43,377 | 58.4 |
| Republican | Daniel Keenan | 30,837 | 41.6 |
| Total votes | | 74,214 | 100.0 |

2026 Arizona's 5th congressional district election
| Party | Candidate | Votes | % | ±% |
|---|---|---|---|---|
| Republican | Mark Lamb | | | |
| Democratic | Elizabeth Lee | | | |
| Total votes | | | | |

== See also ==
- 2026 United States House of Representatives elections in Arizona

== Notes ==
U.S. House of Representatives
| Preceded by Andy Biggs | Member of the U.S. House of Representatives from Arizona's 5th congressional district Taking office 2027 | Elect |
