= List of law enforcement agencies in Arizona =

This is a list of law enforcement agencies in the state of Arizona.

According to the US Bureau of Justice Statistics' 2008 Census of State and Local Law Enforcement Agencies, the state had 141 law enforcement agencies employing 14,591 sworn police officers, about 224 for each 100,000 residents.

== State agencies ==
- Arizona Counter Terrorism Information Center
- Arizona Department of Corrections (ADC)
- Arizona Department of Economic Security
  - Office of Special Investigations
- Arizona Division of Emergency Management
- Arizona Department of Revenue Criminal Investigations Unit
- Arizona Department of Homeland Security
- Arizona Department of Transportation (ADOT)
  - Enforcement and Compliance Division (ECD)
- Arizona Department of Public Safety (DPS)
  - Arizona State Capitol Police
  - Arizona Highway Patrol (DPS)
  - Arizona Rangers
  - Agency Support Division
  - Criminal Investigations Division (CID)
  - Technical Services Division (TSD)
- Arizona Commercial Vehicle Enforcement
- Arizona Game and Fish Department
- Arizona State Park Ranger Police
- Arizona Office of Inspector General (OIG)
- Arizona Counter Assault Team (CAT)
- Arizona HEAT Unit (High Speed Unit) (HEAT)
- Arizona Motor Unit (High Speed Unit) (Motor)
- Arizona Department of Wildlife Rangers (Wildlife)

== Regional agencies ==
- Arizona Gang Task Force
- East Valley DUI Task Force
- Southern Arizona DUI Task Force
- Southeast Arizona Task Force

== County agencies ==
- Apache County Sheriff's Office
- Cochise County Sheriff's Office
- Coconino County Sheriff's Office
- Gila County Sheriff's Office
- Graham County Sheriff's Office
- Greenlee County Sheriff's Office
- La Paz County Sheriff's Office
- Maricopa County Sheriff's Office
- Mohave County Sheriff's Office
- Navajo County Sheriff's Office
- Pima County Sheriff's Department
- Pinal County Sheriff's Office
- Santa Cruz County Sheriff's Office
- Yavapai County Sheriff's Office
- Yuma County Sheriff's Office

== Municipal agencies ==
- Apache Junction Police Department
- Avondale Police Department
- Benson Police Department
- Bisbee Police Department
- Buckeye Police Department
- Bullhead City Police Department
- Camp Verde Marshal's Office
- Casa Grande Police Department
- Chandler Police Department
- Chino Valley Police Department
- Clarkdale Police Department
- Clifton Police Department
- Coolidge Police Department
- Cottonwood Police Department
- Colorado City Hilldale Police Department
- Douglas Police Department
- Eagar Police Department
- El Mirage Police Department
- Eloy Police Department
- Flagstaff Police Department
- Florence Police Department
- Fredonia Marshal's Office
- Gilbert Police Department
- Glendale Police Department
- Globe Police Department
- Goodyear Police Department
- Hayden Police Department
- Holbrook Police Department
- Huachuca City Police Department
- Jerome Police Department
- Kearny Police Department
- Kingman Police Department
- Lake Havasu City Police Department
- Mammoth Police Department
- Marana Police Department
- Maricopa Police Department
- Mesa Police Department
- Miami Police Department
- Nogales Police Department
- Oro Valley Police Department
- Page Police Department
- Paradise Valley Police Department
- Parker Police Department
- Payson Police Department
- Peoria Police Department
- Phoenix Police Department
- Pima Police Department
- Pinetop-Lakeside Police Department
- Prescott Police Department
- Prescott Valley Police Department
- Quartzsite Police Department
- Safford Police Department
- Sahuarita Police Department
- San Luis Police Department
- Scottsdale Police Department
- Sedona Police Department
- Show Low Police Department
- Sierra Vista Police Department
- Snowflake-Taylor Police Department
- Somerton Police Department
- South Tucson Police Department
- Springerville Police Department
- St. Johns Police Department
- Superior Police Department
- Surprise Police Department
- Tempe Police Department
- Thatcher Police Department
- Tolleson Police Department
- Tombstone Marshal's Office
- Tucson Police Department
- Wellton Police Department
- Wickenburg Police Department
- Willcox Police Department
- Williams Police Department
- Winslow Police Department
- Yuma Police Department

== School/College agencies ==
- Arizona State University Police Department
- Arizona Western College Police
- Central Arizona College Police Department
- Chinle School District Police
- Eastern Arizona College Police Department
- Grand Canyon University Police Department
- Maricopa Community Colleges Police Department
- Northern Arizona University Police Department
- Pima Community College Police Department
- Tuba City School District Security
- University of Arizona Police Department
- Yavapai College Police Department

== Tribal agencies ==
- Ak-Chin Police Department
- Cocopah Police Department
- Colorado River Indian Tribal Police Department
- Fort McDowell Police Department
- Gila River Police Department
- Hopi Police Department
- Hualapai Nation Police Department
- Keams Canyon Police Department
- Navajo Nation Police
- Navajo Rangers
- Pascua Yaqui Police Department
- Quechan Tribal Police Department
- Salt River Police Department
- San Carlos Apache Police Department
- Tohono O'odham Nation Police Department
- Tonto Apache Police Department
- White Mountain Apache Police Department
- Yavapai-Apache Police Department
- Yavapai-Prescott Tribal Police

== Federal agencies ==
- Hoover Dam Police Department
- National Park Service
  - National Park Service Rangers
- Bureau of Indian Affairs, Office Justice Services Police
- United States Forest Service
- Office of the United States Marshal for the District of Arizona
- U.S. Customs and Border Protection
- U.S. Immigration and Customs Enforcement
- United States Department of Veterans Affairs Police

== Disbanded Agencies ==
- Youngtown Police Department (disbanded in 2011, replaced by Maricopa County Sheriff's Office)
- Patagonia Marshal's Office (disbanded on July 1, 2021; replaced by Santa Cruz County Sheriff's Office)
