= Pinal County Sheriff's Office =

Law enforcement agency in Arizona

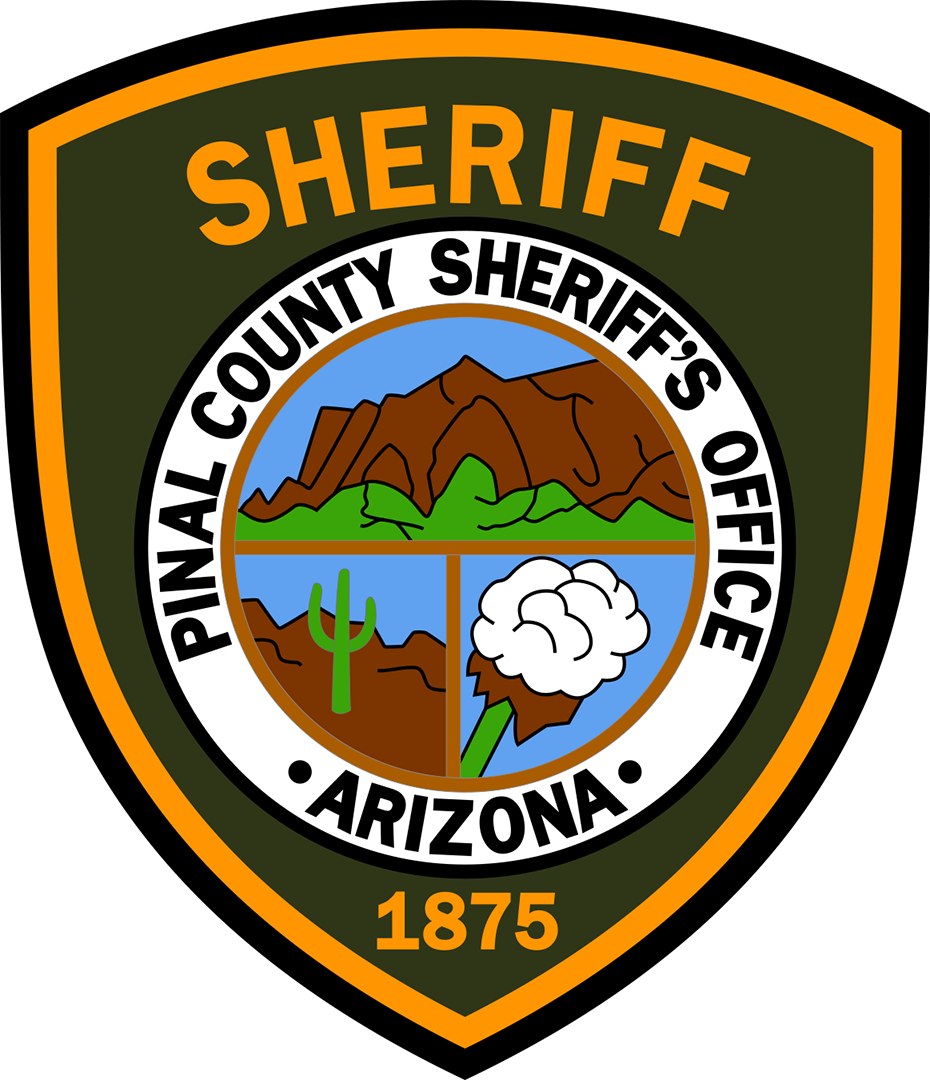

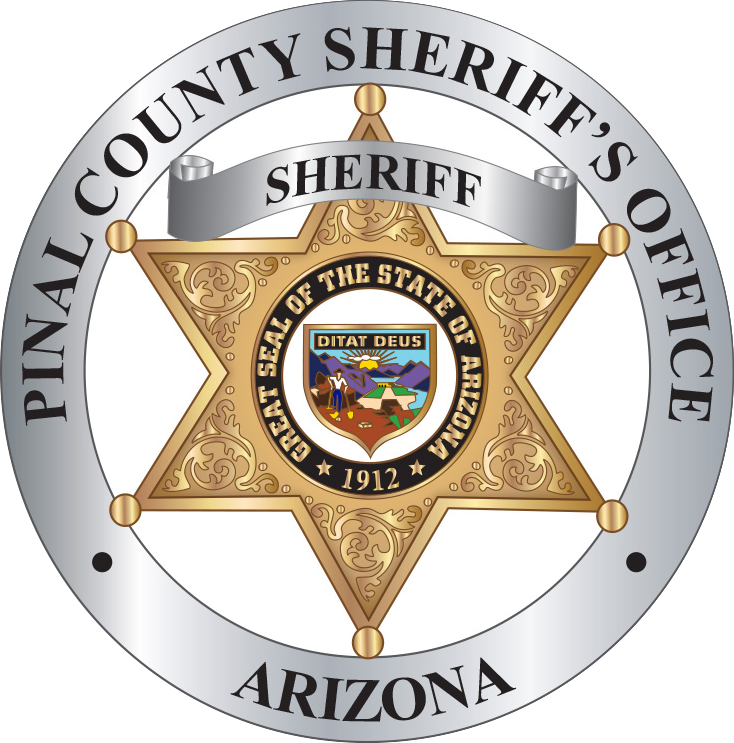
- Abbreviation: PCSO

Agency overview
- Formed: 1875

Jurisdictional structure
- Operations jurisdiction: Pinal County, U.S.
- Area: 5,374 square miles (13,920 km^{2})
- Population: 462,789 (est 2019)

Operational structure
- Headquarters: Florence, Arizona
- Agency executive: Ross Teeple, Sheriff of Pinal County

Website
- Official Website

Formed in 1875, the Pinal County Sheriff's Office (PCSO) is the 3rd largest sheriff's office in Arizona, serving unincorporated areas of Pinal County, Arizona. PCSO provides patrol services, criminal investigation, search and rescue services, and operates the county jail. PCSO's annual budget is nearly $40 million dollars annually, which covers all aspects of the Sheriff’s Office, including the Detention Center. There are nearly 500 employees within the department, 220 are sworn deputies. PCSO is headquartered in Florence, AZ. The current Sheriff is Ross Teeple, elected in November, 2024.

== San Tan Valley Bureau ==
This area is called Region A, or Adam Region. It comprises the newly incorporated town of San Tan Valley. Law Enforcement services are on a contract basis between the Town and The Sheriffs Office. This contract took effect July 1, 2026. This region is the area covered within the towns’ actual boundaries. The San Tan Valley Bureau is supervised by a Captain and 2 Lieutenants. The Bureau consists of 4 patrol squads, Traffic Unit/Motors, Vehicular Crimes Unit, and Criminal Investigations Unit (Detectives). Operations are on a 24/7 basis. Units assigned to the San Tan Valley Bureau regularly assist other areas of the county in calls for service, investigations and traffic enforcement.

== Patrol Bureau ==
Pinal County covers 5,374 square miles and is approximately the size of Connecticut. The county is divided into three Regions. The Patrol Bureau is overseen by a Captain and 3 Lieutenants.

Region B, or Baker Region, covers the south eastern half of the county including the areas of Saddlebrooke, Oracle, and San Manuel. They also routinely support the Towns of Mammoth and Kearny Police departments.

Region C, or Charlie Region, Covers the western and southwestern half's of the county including areas of Red Rock, Arizona City, Stanfield, Hidden Valley, and the incorporated areas of Eloy, Casa Grande, and Maricopa.

Region D, or David Region, Covers the central and northern parts of the county. They patrol the unincorporated areas of San Tan Valley and Queen Creek, Florence, and Coolidge for the central area, and Apache Junction, Gold Canyon, Queen Valley, Superior, and Top of the World to the north.

== Special Units ==
=== Traffic Unit ===
The Traffic Unit consists of two units, The Enforcement/Motors Unit and Vehicular Crimes Units. They are based out of San Tan Valley and are part of the San Tan Valley Bureau. They work and respond to calls all over the county and are not limited to a specific geographic.

Enforcement/Motors consists of 6 Deputies assigned to Motorcycles and or unmarked vehicles whose primary mission is to locate and stop unsafe and aggressive drivers. This unit is also responsible for DUI Enforcement Task Forces. All members of the unit are DRE’s (Drug Recognition Experts) and Law Enforcement Phlebotomists.

The Vehicle Crimes Unit consists of 4 Detectives responsible for serious injury and fatal collisions.

Both units are 24/7 operations with members of the units often “on call” and can be called out anytime to assist with collision and DUI investigations.

=== Air Support Unit ===
One of the PCSO Air Support Unit’s primary functions is search and rescue. The unit's main craft, a UH-1V "Huey" rotorcraft helicopter, was obtained through the military surplus program and is equipped with a hoist to assist in rescues. The Air Unit regularly flies Operation Stonegarden missions, assisting the U.S. Border Patrol in its efforts.

=== Anti-Smuggling Unit ===
The Anti-Smuggling Unit (ASU) is composed of a Sergeant and six Investigators. All operate out of the Criminal Investigations Bureau of the Pinal County Sheriff's Office. The unit targets criminal groups involved in human and drug smuggling. ASU also partners with U.S. Border patrol and Homeland Security.

ASU typically patrols a five-mile stretch of land between the reservation and I-8, attempting to apprehend those crossing illegally there. This desert area south of Maricopa, situated approximately 70 miles north of the border, sees some of the most drug trafficking activity in the Southwest. Smugglers cross the U.S.- Mexico border and walk through the desert for up to a week, until they reach the I-8 corridor. ASU's patrolling of this corridor is often the last line of defense before smuggled drugs enter the Phoenix area. PCSO estimates 40% percent of all drugs in the United States enter through Arizona.

=== K-9 Unit ===
The Pinal County Sheriff's Office K-9 Unit consists of six handler teams.

Four teams support Patrol with the interdiction of drugs entering and passing through Pinal County along major roadways and highways. K-9s regularly intercept loads of counterfeit fentanyl pills being smuggled along the I-10. In 2017, PCSO K-9s discovered 550 pounds of marijuana, seven pounds of meth, 69 pounds of heroin and 53 pounds of cocaine.

Two more K-9 teams are assigned to the Adult Detention Center to assist in maintaining order and detect any contraband attempting to be smuggled into the Adult Detention Facility. The Pinal County Sheriff’s Office has been using K-9’s to serve and protect the County of Pinal for more than 40-years.

=== Narcotics Task Force ===
The Pinal County Narcotics Task Force is a multi-agency task force composed of an administrative Sergeant, an operations Sergeant, nine Investigators and an administrative secretary. The PCNTF is tasked with investigating, prosecuting, disrupting and dismantling individuals and/or groups involved in possession, sales, manufacturing, cultivating, trafficking and smuggling of illegal drugs in or through Pinal County and surrounding areas. On average, PCNTF investigates approximately 200 of these case types annually.

All operate out of the Criminal Investigations Bureau of the Pinal County Sheriff's Office. The Task Force is a High Intensity Drug Trafficking Area (HIDTA) program Initiative/Task Force, which falls under the Southwest HIDTA Group.

=== Search and Rescue ===
The Search and Rescue Unit conducts day and night mobile SAR operations, sometimes during adverse weather conditions, in both urban and wilderness environments. Deputies are on call 24 hours a day, 365 days a year, and at a moment's notice to provide assistance in a crisis. The SAR Unit searches for children, the elderly, unprepared and injured hikers, lost hunters and downed aircraft.

== Detention Center ==
The Pinal County Detention Center houses on average 600 inmates a day. Inmates are offered several pre-release programs to reduce recidivism, including tablets to help advance their education, free tattoo removal to increase chances of employment, and a designated wing for veteran inmates, called the Housing Unit for Military Veterans, or HUMV.

== Sheriffs ==
Since the founding of the department in 1875, there have been 23 Pinal County Sheriffs.

- Michael Rogers (1875)
- Peter Rainsford Brady (1876–1877)
- John Peter Gabriel (1878–1882 and 1885–1886)
- Andrew J. Doran (1883–1884)
- Jere Fryer (1887–1891)
- Lemuel K Drais (1892–93)
- William C Truman (1894–1903)
- Thomas N. Wills (1904– 1907)
- James E McGee (1908–1914)
- Henry D. Hall (1915–1920)
- William A Benson (1925)
- Enis T. Thurman (1921–1924)
- Walter E. Laveen (1925–1938)
- James E. Herron Jr. (1939–1946)
- Lynn Earley (1947–1952)
- Laurence R. White (1953–1961)
- Coy K. De Arman (1962–1974)
- W B Tex Whitington (1975–76)
- Frank R. Reyes (1977–2000)
- Roger Vanderpool (2001–2005)
- Chris Vasquez (2005–2009)
- Paul Babeu (2009–2017)
- Mark Lamb (2017-2024)
- Ross Teeple (2025-)

== Popular media ==
The Pinal County Sheriff's Office has had recurring appearances on A&E's television series Live PD.

The Pinal County Jail is featured in Season 5 of 60 Days In, a television docu-series on A&E.

The Pinal County Sheriff's Office runs a weekly mini series called Fridays with Frank on YouTube and Facebook which features Deputy Sheriff Frank Sloup conducting traffic stops in an entertaining and educational manner.

== See also ==
- List of law enforcement agencies in Arizona

== External links section ==
- Official website
