= Arizona Department of Public Safety =

Arizona state police agency

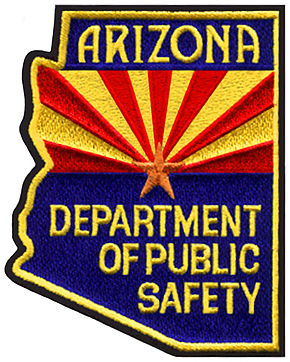
- Patch of the Arizona DPS

- Arizona DPS badge

- Flag of the State of Arizona
- Common name: Department of Public Safety
- Abbreviation: AZDPS or DPS
- Motto: Courteous Vigilance

Agency overview
- Formed: July 1, 1969; 57 years ago
- Employees: 2,071 (as of 2018)

Jurisdictional structure
- Operations jurisdiction: Arizona, U.S.
- Map of Arizona DPS Jurisdiction
- Area: 295,254 square kilometers 113,998 square miles
- Population: 7,278,717 (2019 est.)
- General nature: Civilian police

Operational structure
- Headquarters: 2222 West Encanto Boulevard; Phoenix, Arizona 85009
- Troopers: 1171 (as of 2018)
- Civilian members: 900 (as of 2018)
- Agency executives: Colonel Jeffrey Glover, Director; Lieutenant Colonel Deston Coleman, Deputy Director; Lieutenant Colonel Jennifer Borquez, Agency Support Division Assistant Director; Lieutenant Colonel Jason Leonard, Criminal Investigations Division Assistant Director; Lieutenant Colonel Daven Byrd, Highway Patrol Division Assistant Director; Lieutenant Colonel Jesse Galvez, Technical Services Division Assistant Director
- Districts: 19

Website
- www.azdps.gov

The Arizona Department of Public Safety (AZDPS) or Arizona Highway Patrol (AHP) is a state-level law enforcement agency with a primary function of patrolling and enforcing state laws on Arizona highways. Their headquarters are in Phoenix.

== History ==
In 1968, the Arizona Legislature passed and Arizona Governor Jack Williams signed Chaptered Law 209 of the Laws of 1968 to create the Arizona Department of Public Safety. The department was then formally established by the executive order of Arizona Governor Jack Williams on July 1, 1969.

Combined, the law and executive order amalgamated the functions and responsibilities of the Arizona Highway Patrol, the Law Enforcement Division of the state Department of Liquor Licenses and Control, and the Narcotics Division of the state Department of Law. Additionally, the Bureau of Criminal Identification was moved from the State Prison into the new Department of Public Safety.

In its 50-plus years of service, the department has become an organization dedicated to protecting and providing state-level law enforcement services to the public, and developing partnerships with agencies sharing similar missions.

In 2015, a Rebranding effort began. First, the Title of "officer" was changed to "State Trooper" to more align with other Highway Patrol agencies nationally. Second, and most visible to the public, the white and blue police car was changed entirely to a silver and black paint scheme. The cars are the most visible part of DPS, and the paint/logo scheme had not changed in 50 years.

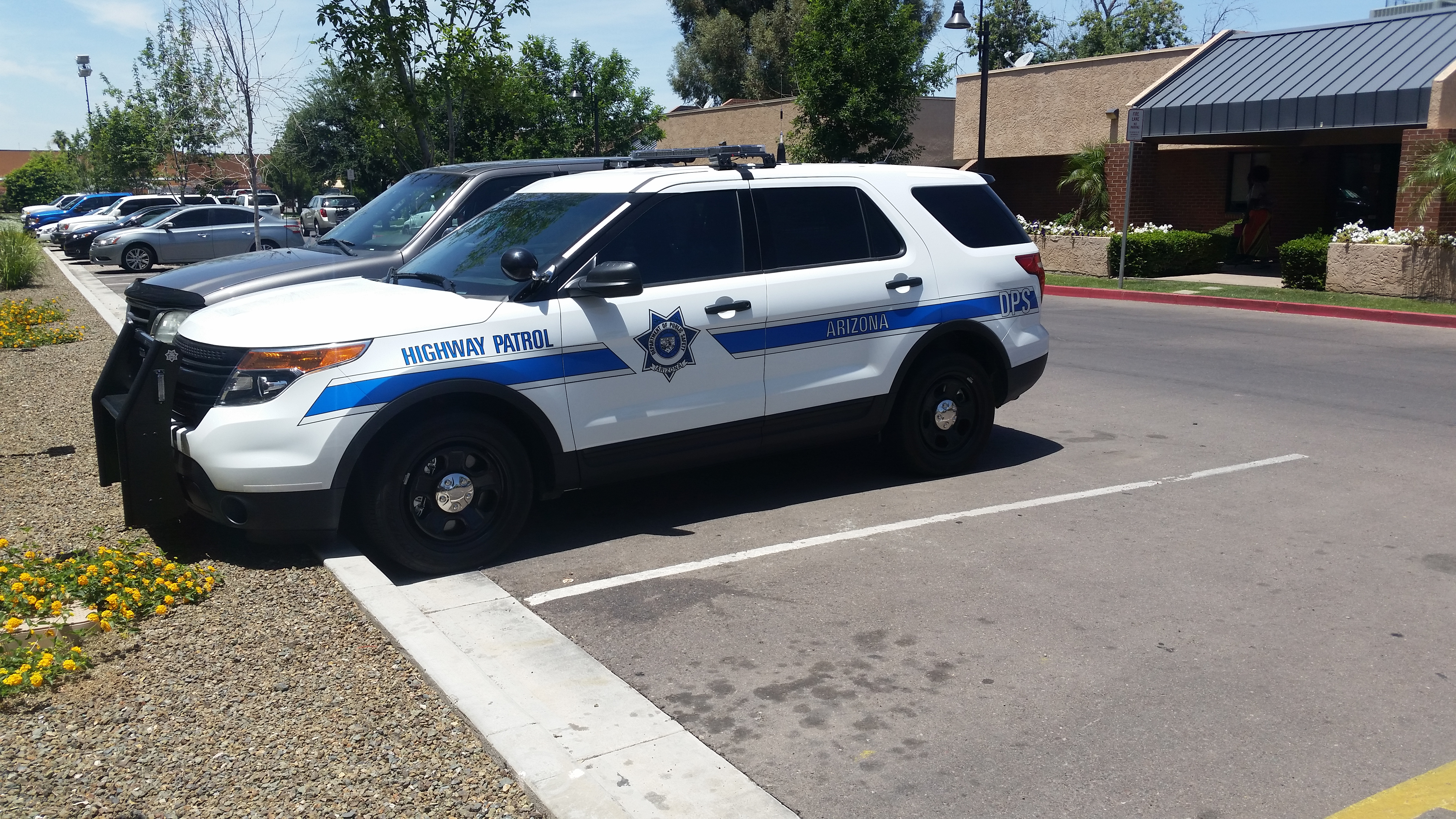
Old DPS Ford Explorer

The department consists of five divisions: Office of the Director, Highway Patrol, Criminal Investigations, Technical Services, and Agency Support. Together, these five divisions provide scientific, technical, operational, and regulatory services to Arizona residents, and to the state's criminal justice community; one of the more famous subdivisions of the Criminal Investigations Division is the "Gang and Immigration Intelligence Team Enforcement Mission" task force (better known as "GIITEM"), which was formed to combat the growing gang infestation problems mainly in Maricopa County (the Phoenix area), even though their jurisdiction is statewide.

In 2011, the Arizona State Capitol Police department was merged with DPS, alongside the Highway Patrol Division. ASCP was responsible for the State Capitol Mall in Phoenix and the Tucson State Complex. Today, the Capitol Police still exists and patrols the Capitol grounds, but they are now full DPS officers, and use DPS cars, logos, and uniforms. Capitol police officers wear special Capitol Police patches on their uniforms.

In 2022, a pilot program was initiated to assign ADOT commercial enforcement officers to the DPS commercial enforcement division.

The department-issued vehicles of the Arizona DPS include the Ford Police Interceptor Utility, Ford Police Interceptor Sedan, Chevrolet Tahoe PPV, Chevrolet Camaro SS, Ford Mustang GT, Ford F-150, Chevrolet Silverado and Dodge Charger Pursuit. Unmarked units can include any of the same vehicles as marked units along with the Dodge Challenger. Motorcycle units can include the Kawasaki Concours 14P, BMW R1150, BMW R1200, and Honda ST1300. The handgun issued as the department weapon is the Glock 17 Generation 5, chambered in 9MM, and carried with three to four 17-round magazines. The long guns issued as department weapons are the Colt AR15A2, Colt M16A2, or Colt M4, supplied with two 30-round magazines. The 12-gauge Remington 870 shotguns are not authorized for carrying and have been modified for less-lethal munitions. SWAT Troopers are issued selective fire, short-barreled rifles.

=== Counter Terrorism Information Center ===
Arizona Counter Terrorism Information Center

Agency overview
- Formed: October 2004
- Type: Fusion center
- Jurisdiction: Arizona
- Parent agency: Arizona Department of Public Safety
- Website: http://www.azactic.gov/

Since 2004 the ADPS has maintained the Arizona Counter Terrorism Information Center (ACTIC), a fusion center that operates 24/7 with the Arizona Department of Homeland Security, FBI and other agencies.

=== Agency Support Division ===
The Agency Support Division supports DPS and other allied agencies in the state. Key services include but are not limited to Air Support Bureau, Human resources, Facilities, Fleet, and Support Services.

==== Aviation Bureau ====
The Aviation Bureau manages the air assets of DPS, the most important of these is the Ranger Air Rescue Program. The program has 4 bases located in Phoenix, Flagstaff, Kingman and Tucson. The Program provides SAR, Physical Rescue, (long line, hoist, Short haul, and Rappel) and other logistical support, like wildland "Bambi Bucket" water drops to aid in wildland firefighting. Aeromedical transport is available if traditional services are not . All Helicopters are Bell 407s and one Bell 429. Crew staffing is 1 pilot and one Paramedic flight observer.

In 2015, the assets of Arizona Dept. of Transportation and DPS were combined under DPS's umbrella. There are now a total of 15 aircraft assigned.

=== OPCOMM ===
OPCOMM is the Operational Communications Bureau, the dispatch and 9-1-1 answering point for DPS. There are 2 dispatch centers, in Phoenix and Tucson. A third center used to operate in Flagstaff for the northern counties but closed in 2020 due to lack of available staff. They dispatch for the entire agency, including task forces, such as GITTEM, Criminal Investigations and the Aviation Bureau. 100 personnel assigned answer over 700,000 calls for service each year.

== Demographics ==
As of July 2018 (Note: Numbers are rounded to the nearest whole number):

	Sworn Staff	Professional Staff	Overall
Male	96%	47%	72%
Female	4%	53%	27%
White	78%	77%	78%
African American	2%	5%	3%
Hispanic	18%	14%	16%
Asian/Pacific Islander	1%	4%	2%
Native American	1%	1%	1%
Age 40+	54%	70%	62%

== See also ==
- List of law enforcement agencies in Arizona
- State police
- Highway patrol
