= Thomas N. Wills =

American rancher/politician from Arizona

Member of the Arizona Senate from the Pinal County district
- In office January 1927 – December 1928
- Preceded by: A. T. Kilcrease
- Succeeded by: George Truman

Sheriff of Pinal County
- In office 1904–1907
- Preceded by: William C. Truman
- Succeeded by: James E. McGee

Personal details
- Born: January 17, 1866 Mariposa County, California
- Died: June 23, 1940 (aged 74) Tucson, Arizona
- Party: Democratic
- Spouse: Elizabeth C. Chamberlain (m. 1896)
- Profession: Politician

Thomas Nelson Wills was an American politician from Arizona. He served a single term in the Arizona State Senate during the 8th Arizona State Legislature, holding one of the two seats from Pima County. He served several terms as a member of the Pinal County Board of Supervisors, and two terms as the Pinal County Sheriff. In his younger years, he worked rodeos, and was a member of Buffalo Bill's Wild West Show.

== Biography ==
Wills was born in Mariposa County, California on January 17, 1866. He moved to Agua Caliente, Arizona in 1883. As a young man he traveled, following rodeos around the country and in 1893 performed in a wild west show at the Chicago World Fair, and was also in Buffalo Bill's Wild West Show. He married Elizabeth C. Chamberlain of San Pedro in 1896. In 1900 he began the first of two consecutive terms on the Pinal County Board of Supervisors. He would serve another four consecutive terms as a supervisor from 1910 to 1918. From 1906 to 1910 he served as the Pinal County Sheriff. In 1910 he was a member of the State Constitutional Convention. He was a cattleman by vocation, and owned several ranches over the years, including the Tom Brown Ranch on the San Pedro River, and the Interocean Ranch.

Wills died on June 23, 1940, at his home in Tucson, Arizona from a heart attack. He had retired from ranching in 1934 and moved to Tucson, and had been in ill health for two years prior to his death.
