= Camp Verde Marshal's Office (Arizona) =

Arizona Law enforcement agency

- Abbreviation: CVMO

Agency overview
- Preceding agency: Town Marshal

Jurisdictional structure
- Operations jurisdiction: Camp Verde, Arizona, US
- Area: 42.36 sq mi (109.7 km^{2}).
- Population: 12 147
- General nature: Local civilian police

Operational structure
- Constables/Marshals: 22
- Civilians: 12
- Elected officer responsible: Dee Jenkins, Mayor of Camp Verde
- Agency executives: Corey L. Rowley, Town Marshal; Daniel Jacobs, Patrol Commander; Darby Martin, Administrative Commander
- Divisions: 2: Operation Services Division; Support Services Division
- Bureaus: 1: Office of the Town Marshal

Website
- www.campverde.az.gov/departments/marshals-office

The Camp Verde Marshal's Office is the law enforcement agency responsible for the city of Camp Verde, Arizona.

== Description ==
Law enforcement is handled by Camp Verde town marshals. The Camp Verde Marshal's Office provides police services for a population of more than 12,000 residents covering about 42 square miles nestled along the Verde River surrounded by the Prescott and Coconino National Forests.

The following structural divisions are at their disposal: Patrol, Traffic Enforcement, K9 unit, SRO, Criminal Investigation, Communications, Records, Animal Control, Professional Standards, Community Resources, and Volunteers in Police Services.

== Rank structure ==
Toggle the table of contents Camp Verde Marshal's Office rank structure
Title	Insignia
Town Marshal	
Commander	
Lieutenant	
Sergeant	
Field training officer	
Detective	
Constable	

== See also ==
- List of law enforcement agencies in Arizona
