= Janel Lamb =

American author and public speaker

- Born: Janel Amber DeRusha; September 17, 1974 (age 52); Duluth, Minnesota, US
- Occupation: cosmetologist • flight attendant • public speaker • author
- Political party: Republican
- Spouse: Mark Lamb (m. 1994)
- Children: 5

Janel Amber Lamb (née DeRusha; born September 17, 1974) is an American retired cosmetologist, former flight attendant, public speaker and author who is the wife of congressman-elect and former Sheriff of Pinal County Mark Lamb. A member of the Republican Party, Lamb is active in politics and has been involved in her husband's campaigns in Arizona.

Born in Duluth, Minnesota, Lamb moved to Mesa, Arizona at a young age and pursued a career as a hair stylist. Lamb met her future husband, Mark, in 1993. They married in 1994 and had 5 children. Lamb operated a beauty salon from her home while raising her children, and in 2012 became a flight attendant. Lamb later retired to help her husband in his political campaigns. In 2020, Lamb published a book called "The Sheriff’s Wife: Holding it all together behind the scenes in politics." The book details her experiences as the wife of sheriff Mark Lamb and managing everything. Lamb later published another book, Bravery and Blinders. Lamb later was involved in her husband's successful campaign to Congress in 2026 amid allegations made against her husband, which she denied.

== Early life and education ==
Janel Amber DeRusha was born on September 17, 1974, in Duluth, Minnesota in the United States to Judith Sortedahl and Kevin DeRusha, spending her early years in a house near the woods. At the age of 7, in 1981, DeRusha and her family relocated to Mesa, Arizona. Her father owned a construction business which influenced her in her upbringing.

DeRusha attended Ellison Elementary School in Mesa and later attended Kino Junior High. She then went on to attend Mountain View High School, graduating in 1993. After her graduation, DeRusha pursued her lifelong dream of becoming a hair stylist.

=== Family and religion ===
Janel met her future husband Mark Lamb at a church dance in 1993 at Arizona State University. The two got engaged two weeks after her fiancé returned from his mission in Panama. They married on September 23, 1994. Together they have five children named Cade, Sadie, Cooper, Wyatt, and Dayton. She is a grandmother. In December 2022, days before Christmas Lamb's son, Cooper her daughter-in-law Caroline and granddaughter Elaine passed away from a car accident in Gilbert, Arizona. Her son was killed by a drunk driver, and the driver was arrested after the incident. Lamb and her husband publicly forgave their son's killer. Lamb is a member of The Church of Jesus Christ of Latter-day Saints. Before finally settling down in Arizona her, her husband and kids lived in Utah and Florida.

== Career ==
Lamb worked as a hair stylist, owning her own business and working at home for 26 years while she was raising her children. In 2012, Lamb began a career working as a flight attendant before she retired from the role to support her husband's role in politics and supporting his political campaigns.

In 2020, Lamb published a book called The Sheriff's Wife: Holding it all together behind the scenes in politics. The book details her experiences as the wife of Sheriff Mark Lamb and a household with her husband and kids as his wife. The book also covers her spouse pressures, depression, and public life. Lamb also released a second book titled Bravery and Blinders.

Lamb played a role in her husband's campaign for the United States House of Representatives for Arizona's 5th congressional district in 2026 by helping him campaign, and when he came under pressure from sexual assault allegations she publicly denied the claims made and supported her husband. Her husband was successful and won the election on November 3. (Note: Lamb's husband Mark was officially announced as the winner of the election on Friday, November 6th to become a member of the United States House of Representatives for Arizona's 5th congressional district.)

== See also ==
- 2026 United States House of Representatives elections in Arizona
