= Cochise County Sheriff's Office =

Law enforcement agency in Arizona

- Patch of Cochise County Sheriff's Office
- Abbreviation: CCSO
- Motto: Leading The Way

Agency overview
- Formed: 1881; 145 years ago

Jurisdictional structure
- Operations jurisdiction: Cochise, Arizona, USA
- Map of Cochise County Sheriff's Office's jurisdiction
- Area: 6,219 square miles (16,110 km^{2})
- Population: 117,755 (2000)
- General nature: Local civilian police

Operational structure
- Headquarters: Bisbee, Arizona
- Agency executive: Mark Dannels, Sheriff

Facilities
- Planes: Helicopter - Geronimo

Website
- Cochise County Sheriff's Office

The Cochise County Sheriff's Office (CCSO), headquartered in Bisbee, Arizona, is a local law enforcement agency that serves Cochise County, Arizona. It provides general-service law enforcement to unincorporated areas of Cochise County, serving as the equivalent of the police for unincorporated areas of the county. It also operates the county jail system. The Cochise County Sheriff's Office (CCSO) is sometimes referred to as the Cochise County Sheriff's Department (CCSD).

== Sheriffs ==
| # | Portrait | Name | Term in office | Length of service | Party affiliation | Previous office |
|---|---|---|---|---|---|---|
| 1 | | Johnny Behan (1844–1912; aged 67) | 1881 – 1882 | 2 years | Democratic | |
| 2 | No image available | Jerome L. Ward (1833–1913; aged 80) | 1883 – 1884 | 2 years | Republican | |
| 3 | No image available | Robert S. Hatch (1841–1904; aged 62) | 1885 – 1886 | 2 years | | |
| 4 | | John Slaughter (1841–1922; aged 80) | 1887 – 1890 | 3 years | | |
| 5 | No image available | Carlton B. Kelton (1839–1925; aged 86) | 1891 – 1892 | 2 years | | |
| 6 | No image available | Scott White (1856–1935; aged 78) | 1893 – 1894 | 2 years | Democratic | Supervisor of Cochise County (1890–1892) |
| 7 | No image available | C.S. Fly (1849–1901; aged 52) | 1895 – 1897 | 2 years | | |
| 8 | No image available | Scott White | 1897 – 1900 | 3 years | Democratic | Clerk of the District Court of Cochise County (1895–1896) |
| 9 | No image available | Adelbert Lewis (1864–1911; aged 47) | 1901 – 1904 | 3 years | | |
| 10 | No image available | Stewart Hunt | 1905 – 1906 | 2 years | | |
| 11 | No image available | John F. White (1867–1947; aged 80) | 1907 – 1912 | 5 years | | |
| 12 | | Harry C. Wheeler (1875–1925; aged 50) | 1913 – 1918 | 7 years | | |
| 13 | No image available | Guy Welch (1879–1944; aged 64) | 1918 – | 8 months | | Undersheriff (1912–1918) |
| 14 | No image available | James F. McDonald | 1918 – 1920 | 2 years | | Street superintendent of Bisbee, Arizona |
| 15 | No image available | Joe C. Hood (1880–1960; aged 80) | 1921 – 1922 | 2 years | | |
| 16 | No image available | George Henshaw (1879–1963; aged 84) | 1927 – 1930 | 3 years | | |
| 17 | No image available | Fred Kenney † (1880–1931; aged 51) | 1931 – 1932 | 2 years | | |
| Acting | No image available | I. V. Pruitt | June 18, 1932 – November 6, 1932 | 49 days | None | Chief deputy |
| 18 | No image available | Tom Voelker | 1933 – 1934 | 2 years | | |
| 19 | No image available | I. V. Pruitt (1893–1969; aged 76) | 1935 – 1952 | 17 years | | |
| 20 | No image available | J.W. "Jack" Howard (died 1959) | 1953 – 1958 | 5 years | | Undersheriff |
| 21 | No image available | Charlie Stewart | 1959 – 1960 | 2 years | | Undersheriff |
| 22 | No image available | Phil Olander (1929–2010; aged 81) | 1961 – 1964 | 3 years | | |
| 23 | No image available | T.J. "Jim" Wilson | 1965 – 1976 | 11 years | Democratic | |
| 24 | No image available | Jimmy V. Judd (1933–2005; aged 72) | 1977 – 1992 | 15 years | Democratic | Undersheriff |
| 25 | No image available | John R. Pintek | 1993 – 1996 | 3 years | Democratic | |
| 26 | No image available | Larry A. Dever † (1951–2012; aged 60) | 1997 – 2012 | 15 years | Republican | Chief deputy |
| Acting | No image available | Rod Rothrock | September 18, 2012 – November 5, 2012 | 49 days | None | Chief deputy |
| 29 | No image available | Mark J. Dannels (born in 1963; aged 54) | November 6, 2012 – Incumbent | 10 years | Republican | Police Chief of Coquille, Oregon (2008–2011) |

== See also ==
- List of law enforcement agencies in Arizona
- The Sheriff of Cochise, 1956-1957 TV series about a fictional sheriff of Cochise County
