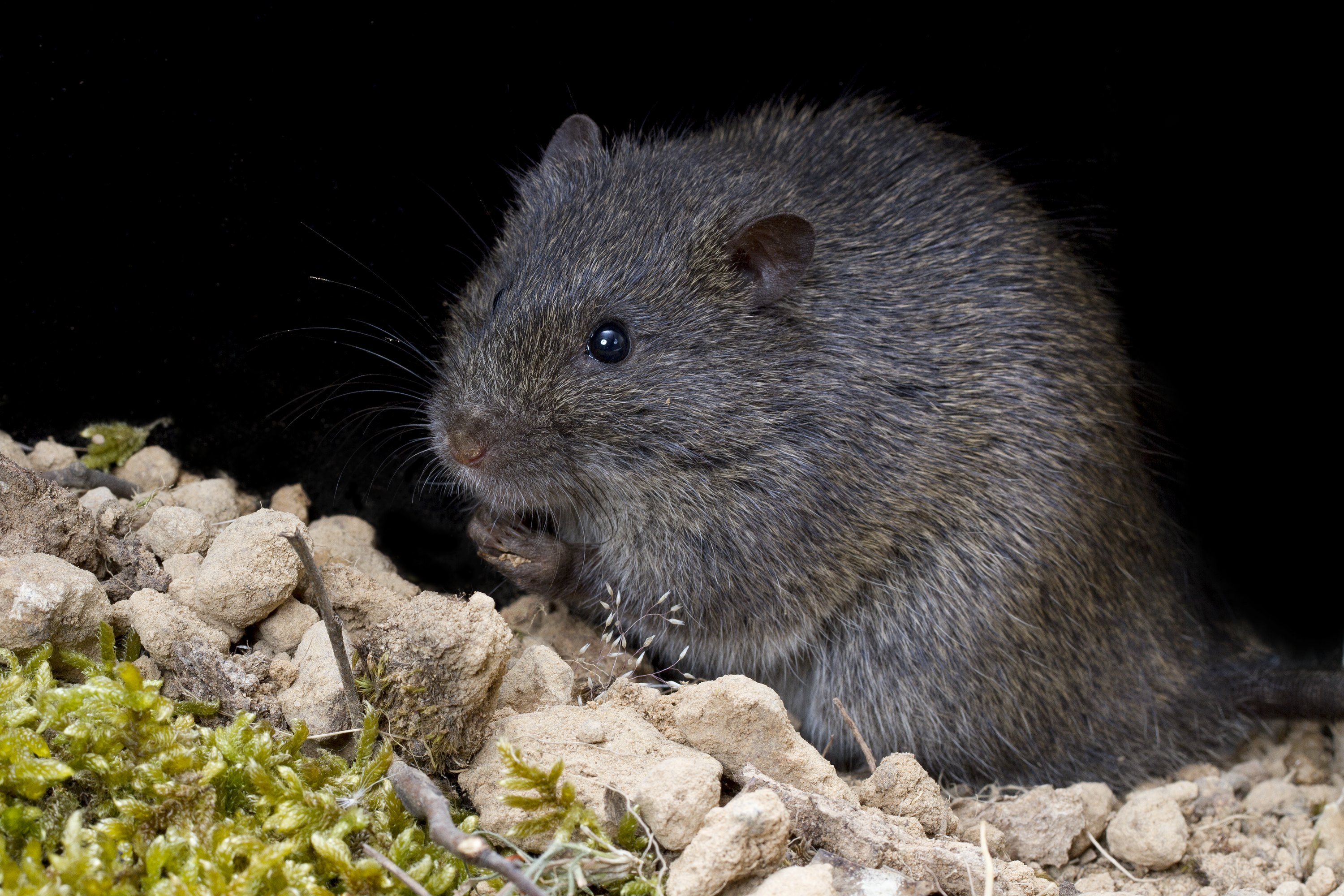

Conservation status
- Least Concern (IUCN 3.1)

Scientific classification
- Kingdom: Animalia
- Phylum: Chordata
- Class: Mammalia
- Order: Rodentia
- Family: Muridae
- Genus: Rattus
- Species: R. lutreolus

Binomial name
- Rattus lutreolus (Gray, 1841)

= Australian swamp rat =

Australian swamp rat Temporal range: Holocene to present

Species of rodent

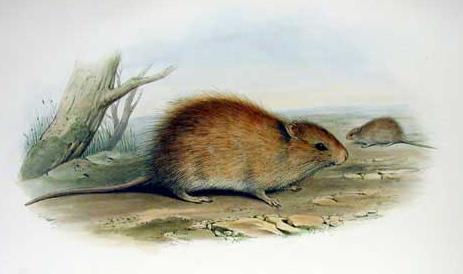
An illustration of the Australian swamp rat published in John Gould's The Mammals of Australia

The Australian swamp rat (Rattus lutreolus), also known as the eastern swamp rat, is a species of rat native to the coasts of southern and eastern Australia.

== Description ==
The Australian swamp rat grows to have a body length of approximately 160 millimetres (6 in) with a tail length of approximately 110 mm (4.3 in) and a mass of about 120 grams (4 oz). It has a stocky build with black-brown fur and black feet. Its ventral surface is cream to brown color and it has small ears nearly concealed by hair. The tail is dark grey, scaly and sparsely haired.

== Ecology ==
=== Range and habitat ===
The swamp rat is found near the coast of south and eastern Australia. It occurs in lowland country from Fraser Island down the coast of New South Wales and Victoria to the Mount Lofty Ranges in South Australia. A subspecies velutinus can be found in Tasmania, and another subspecies lacus lives in isolated patches of high altitude rainforest near Atherton, Queensland.

The preferred habitat of the swamp rat is thick vegetation along watercourses and in swamps. The dense vegetation of islands above the high water mark is also suitable. They can also live in areas of coastal heath, dune scrub, grasslands and sedgelands. The rats will form tunnels through the vegetation through which they can move. The species tends to choose the habitat based on density of vegetation in the area. Areas prone to fire tend not to be recolonised. The swamp rat can be seen at places like the Healesville Sanctuary, where they live in the grounds.

=== Diet ===
The diet is vegetarian; consisting of reeds, seeds, and swamp grass stems. During the summer months, the species will increase its intake of insects as well as fungi; however, during spring months the rats switch to eating an increased amount of seeds due to their abundance and possible nutritional value in breeding season.

== Behaviour ==
=== Feeding ===
Behaviour is partly nocturnal and diurnal so it is active during the day and at night. It is thought that the species does not collect the sufficient amount of food throughout the night and must also collect vegetation during the day.

=== Reproduction and Predation ===
The rats reach sexual maturity around August and start to breed come October. The species has a litter size ranging from one to eleven on average with a gestation period lasting around 23 to 25 days. Olfactory senses are used to smell certain species' odours, allowing them to detect predators.

== See also ==
- Bush rat
- Swamp rat
