= Gila County Sheriff's Office =

Law enforcement agency in Arizona

- Abbreviation: GCSO

Jurisdictional structure
- Operations jurisdiction: Gila County, Arizona, Arizona, USA
- Map of Gila County Sheriff's Office's jurisdiction
- Area: 4,796 square miles (12,420 km^{2})
- Population: 51,335 (2000)
- Governing body: O
- General nature: Local civilian police

Operational structure
- Headquarters: Globe, Arizona
- Agency executive: J. Adam Shepherd, Sheriff

Website
- Gila County Sheriff's page

The Gila County Sheriff's Office (GCSO) is a local law enforcement agency that serves Gila County, Arizona. It provides general-service law enforcement to unincorporated areas of Gila County, serving as the equivalent of the police for unincorporated areas of the county. It also operates the county jail system. The Gila County Sheriff's Office (GCSO) is primarily headquartered in Globe, Arizona, with a separate patrol, communications, and detention facility located in Payson, Arizona.

The old sheriff's office and jail was built in 1910 and last used in 1981. It is now a museum.

Between 2018 and 2022, the GCSO has been sued four times for mistreatment of mentally ill inmates in the county jail.

== Sheriffs ==
- William "Burt" Murphy (1 Jul 1881- 7 Nov 1881)
- W.W. "Tip" Lowther (7 Nov 1881- 7 Nov 1882)
- Benjamin F. Pascoe (7 Nov 1882- 7 Nov 1886)
- E.E. Hodgeson (7 Nov 1886- 15 Jun 1887)
- George E. Shute (15 Jun 1887- 7 Nov 1888)
- Glen Reynolds (7 Nov 1888- 2 Nov 1889)- K.I.A
- Jerry Ryan (acting, 2 Nov 1889- 7 Nov 1890)
- John Henry Thompson (7 Nov 1890- 7 Nov 1896)
- Dan H. Williamson (7 Nov 1896- 7 Nov 1898)
- William T. Armstrong (7 Nov 1898- 7 Nov 1900)
- John Henry Thompson (7 Nov 1900- 7 Nov 1902)
- C.R. Rogers (7 Nov 1902- 7 Nov 1905)
- Edward P. Shanley (7 Nov 1905- 7 Nov 1906)
- W.G. Shanley (acting, 7 Nov 1906- 15 Jun 1907)
- John Henry Thompson (15 Jun 1907- 7 Nov 1911)
- Frank Haynes (7 Nov 1911- 7 Nov 1916)
- Thomas James Armer (7 Nov 1916- 7 Nov 1918)
- Eugene Shute (7 Nov 1918- 7 Nov 1920 )
- Tol Kinsey (7 Nov 1920- 7 Nov 1922)
- James Alf Edwards (7 Nov 1922- 7 Nov 1930)
- Charles Byrne (7 Nov 1930- 7 Nov 1940)
- Bill Richardson (7 Nov 1940- 7 Nov 1948)
- Jack Jones (7 Nov 1948- 7 Nov 1964)
- Lyman Lee Peace (7 Nov 1964- 7 Nov1966)
- Elton Jones ( 7 Nov 1966-7 Nov 1970)
- Ted Lewis (7 Nov 1970- 7 Nov 1972)
- Lyman Lee Peace (7 Nov 1972- 7 Nov 1984)
- Joe Miguel Rodriguez ( 7 Nov 1984- 7 Nov 2000)
- John Robert Armer ( 7 Nov 2000- 7 Nov 2012)
- James Adam Shepard ( 7 Nov 2012- )

== See also ==
- List of law enforcement agencies in Arizona
