= George Truman (cricketer) =

Australian cricketer

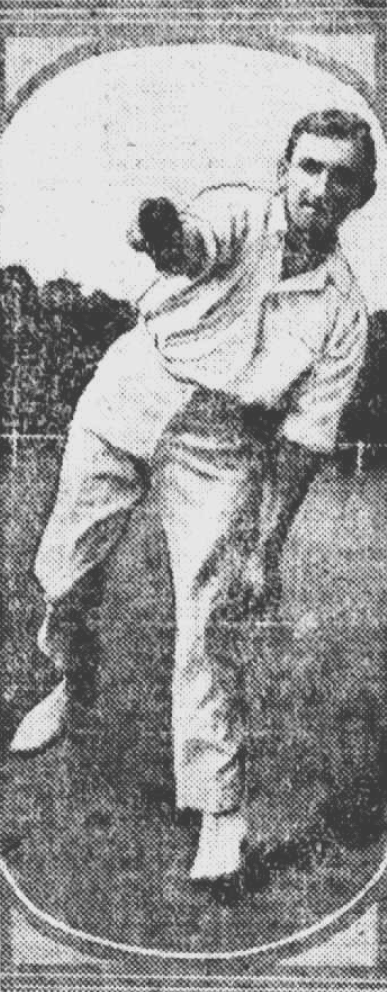

Personal information
- Born: 6 December 1886; Melbourne, Australia
- Died: 17 June 1955 (aged 68); Brighton, Victoria, Australia

Domestic team information
- Years: Team
- 1919: Victoria
- Source: Cricinfo, 19 November 2015

George Truman (6 December 1886 – 17 June 1955) was an Australian cricketer. He played one first-class cricket match for Victoria in 1919.

== See also ==
- List of Victoria first-class cricketers
