= George E. Truman =

American politician from Arizona

George Truman
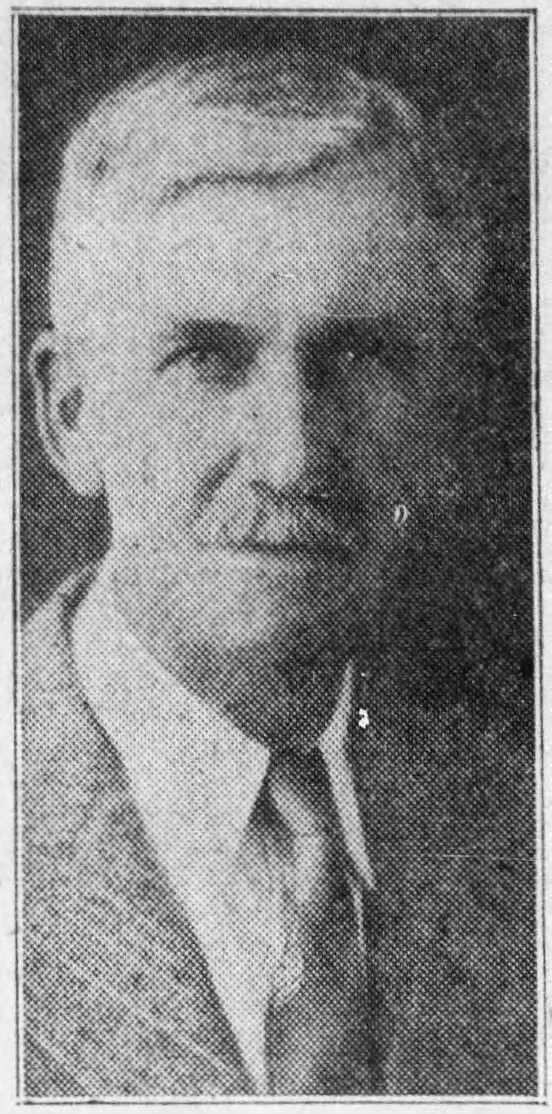
- Truman, ca. 1929

Member of the Arizona Senate from the Pinal County district
- In office January 1929 – December 1930
- Preceded by: Thomas N. Wills
- Succeeded by: R. T. (Bob) Jones

Personal details
- Party: Democratic
- Profession: Politician

George E. Truman (1865–1929) was an American politician from Arizona. He served a single term in the Arizona State Senate during the 9th Arizona State Legislature, holding the seat from Pinal County. During the Spanish–American War, he was one of the first men up San Juan Hill.

== Biography ==
Truman was born in 1865 in Sauquoit, New York. He moved to Arizona in 1890 from Utica, New York, and went to work as a deputy sheriff, under his brother, William Truman, Pinal County Sheriff, serving for three consecutive terms. He lived in Florence, Arizona.

With the outbreak of the Spanish–American War, Truman volunteered and joined Teddy Roosevelt's Rough Riders, traveling to San Antonio, Texas, where he joined Jim McClintock's company, before traveling on to Tampa, Florida. Shortly before leaving for the war, Truman married Mary Collingwood. During the war, Truman was one of the first, if not the first, soldiers up the top of the hill during the Battle of San Juan Hill. While in Cuba, Truman contracted malaria, and recuperated in Utica, New York, before returning to Arizona.

After returning from the war, he served in various political offices including Pinal County assessor, county treasurer, county clerk, as well as serving on the County Board of Supervisors. In 1928 he ran for the single Arizona State Senate seat from Pinal County. He was unopposed in the Democrat's primary, and was won the November general election. In September 1929 he was on vacation with his family in California, when he required emergency surgery. He died during the procedure on September 3, in a San Francisco hospital.
