= Swamp rat =

Swamp rat(s) may refer to:

Animals

Swamp rat is a common name for a number of not closely related types of semiaquatic rodents of superfamily Muroidea, including:

- Andean swamp rat (Neotomys ebriosus), a cricetid
- Australian swamp rat (Rattus lutreolus), a murid
- Malacomys, three murid species of Africa:
- Scapteromys, three cricetid species from southeastern South America:
- Swamp rice rat (Oryzomys palustris), a cricetid of southeastern North America

It may also refer to the semiaquatic echimyid known as the coypu.

Other

- a series of famous Top Fuel dragsters created by Don Garlits
- Swamp Ratte', former name of hacker Grandmaster Ratte'
- A subset of hillbilly or redneck that lives near the bayou.
