= Arizona Department of Homeland Security =

State agency

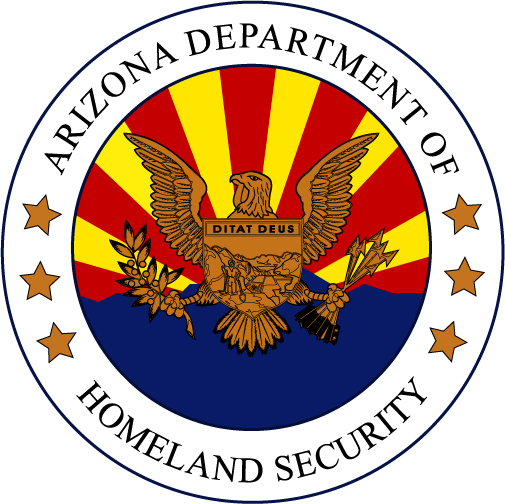

Agency overview
- Type: Department of Homeland Security
- Jurisdiction: Arizona
- Headquarters: 1802 West Jackson Street #117, Phoenix, Arizona 85007, USA
- Agency executive: Kim O'Connor, Director
- Website: www.azdohs.gov

The Arizona Department of Homeland Security (AZDOHS) is a state agency within the executive branch of the Arizona state government designed to develop, coordinate, and implement of a state policy to secure the state of Arizona from terrorist threat or attack. AZDOHS manages federal homeland security grants related to terrorism prevention and hazard management and protects Arizona's governmental entities from cybersecurity threats.

Arizona is divided into five homeland security regions grouped together by counties:

- Central Region: Maricopa County
- East Region: Gila, Graham, Greenlee and Pinal counties
- North Region: Apache, Coconino and Navajo counties
- South Region: Cochise, Pima, Santa Cruz and Yuma counties
- West Region: La Paz, Mohave and Yavapai counties

== See also ==
- Arizona Counter Terrorism Information Center
