= 60 Days In =

American reality series

- Genre: Reality
- Starring: Jamey Noel; Scottie Maples; Mark Adger; Mark Lamb; Jonathan W. Horton; Reginald B. Scandrett; Mark Smith
- Country of origin: United States
- Original language: English
- No. of seasons: 9
- No. of episodes: 128

Production
- Executive producers: Gregory Henry; Kimberly Woodard; Jeff Grogan
- Production locations: Jeffersonville, Indiana; Atlanta, Georgia; Florence, Arizona; Gadsden, Alabama; McDonough, Georgia; Utah County, Utah
- Camera setup: Multiple
- Running time: 40–50 minutes
- Production company: Lucky 8
- Budget: $3 million USD

Original release
- Network: A&E
- Release: March 10, 2016 – present

Related
- Beyond Scared Straight; Caught Red Handed

60 Days In is an American reality television series on A&E in which volunteers are incarcerated as undercover prisoners for 60 days. Internationally, it is known as The Jail: 60 Days In and airs in over 100 other countries.

The show premiered on March 10, 2016, while Season 2 premiered on August 18. Seasons 1 and 2 took place in Clark County Jail in Jeffersonville, Indiana, but Seasons 3 and 4 saw the show's setting moved to the Fulton County Jail in Atlanta.

The fifth season, which premiered on January 3, 2019, took place in Florence, Arizona, at the Pinal County Jail. On November 19, 2019, the show was renewed for a sixth season, which takes place in the Etowah County Detention Center in Gadsden, Alabama, and premiered on January 2, 2020. On July 1, 2022, the show was announced to return for a seventh season, taking place at the Henry County Sheriff's Office in McDonough, Georgia; premiering on August 18, 2022, it was the first season to have a cast composed entirely of former inmates. The show returned for an eighth season, taking place at Pitt County Detention Center in North Carolina. It premiered on June 15, 2023, and ended on September 14, 2023. On May 30, 2024, the show returned for a ninth season, centered inside the Utah County Jail.

A spinoff titled 60 Days In: Narcoland began airing on July 30, 2019.

== Premise ==
The television series follows seven individuals as they volunteer to go undercover, spending 60 days as prison inmates. Their goal is to obtain evidence of questionable or illegal activities within the jail that might be missed by the correctional officers and surveillance systems. The existence of the undercover program is kept secret from the inmates, the guards, and most of the jail officials. Prior to entering the jail, the volunteers receive instruction on how to act around other inmates, and they are each given a pseudonym and a cover story, including details of the fake criminal charges on which they were arrested.

The first two seasons occurred in the Clark County Jail (also known as the Michael L. Becher Adult Correctional Complex), in Jeffersonville, Indiana. Although it was repeatedly mentioned that Maryum Ali was given an alias to use because of her famous father (boxer Muhammad Ali), it was later revealed that volunteer Robert was also using an alias while imprisoned, and that he would blow his cover if he visited an emergency room and gave his real name.

Because producers realized that it would be difficult for volunteers to remain undercover after the first season aired, a second season was produced before the series premiered. Representatives from A&E told Business Insider that multiple corrections officers were fired due to the program. According to the producers, valid legal releases to appear on television were obtained from inmates, but they were not told the actual reason that the releases were needed.

The series revealed the importance of tater tots. The meal trays frequently served tater tots to the inmates. On the show, two real inmates allegedly fought over the potato-based food, which they occasionally used as currency. The Clark County Sheriff's Office held a community fundraiser where they sold T-shirts and tater tots based on the show.

Season 2 began airing on Thursday August 18, 2016, with 60 Days In: Meet the Participants premiering on August 11. Season 2 episodes began airing on Wednesday, September 28, 2016, on Foxtel's crime + investigation network in Australia.

== Notable incidents ==
During season 4, women's pod participant Angel Cooper started a relationship with another inmate. Cooper later revealed her participation in the show to the inmate, causing her to be pulled from the pod. Colonel Mark Adger made the decision to end the program early due to Cooper's actions.

== Cast ==
=== Season 1 cast ===
- Jamey Noel, the sheriff of Clark County, Indiana
- Scottie Maples, a public information officer. He takes responsibility for briefing the volunteers before the program begins and debriefing them afterward.
- Maryum May May Ali (Yasmin Brown), social worker
- Barbra Roylance Williams (Barbara Weldon), author
- Tami Ferraiuolo (Tami Ferguson), former police officer
- Jeffrey Downs, security officer
- Robert Holcomb, a teacher. He spent a month in solitary confinement during his five-week stay in jail for covering a security camera with a towel in an attempt to impress the other inmates. He faked constipation so that he wouldn't have to go back into general population, which he was slated to do the next day. He previously appeared on TLC's Extreme Time Cheaters.
- Isaiah Jenkins, recent high school graduate and brother of a current inmate. Jenkins reported on Twitter that he visited his jailed brother, who said, "Wassup, hot coffee?" The code phrases for the volunteers to be extricated from jail were "good coffee" or "hot coffee"). Isaiah had not previously appeared on television.
- Zachary Baker (Zac Holland), veteran

=== Season 2 cast ===
- Ashleigh Marie (Park) Baker, wife of season 1's Zachary Baker. She is an alcoholic and addict from childhood, but had been sober for four years before appearing on the show.
- Brian Thomas (J.D.), an attorney for the California Department of Corrections & Rehabilitation's Office of Legal Affairs' Employment Advocacy Prosecution Team. He is responsible for administratively prosecuting correctional officers who commit job-related misconduct. He entered the program to see how correctional officers behave when they believe nobody is looking. He exited the program after one week due to severe hazing, but was still able to provide valuable information at the debriefing session. He has since entered private practice and is practicing law in Southern California.
- Chris Graf entered the program to better understand how jail impacted his younger brother, a former inmate who served four months in jail. He left the program within 24 hours after becoming violently ill and suffering from severe panic attacks.
- Dion Shepherd Jr., a criminology student from Detroit. He grew up one of nine siblings and his parents separated shortly after he was born. He felt he could have easily ended up behind bars like many of his friends and family. He was able to leave home without a criminal record and is about to receive a master's degree in criminology, Law and Society.
- Monalisa Johnson, the founder of Parents of Incarcerated Children, a national support and advocacy group for parents with incarcerated children. Her daughter is serving a ten-year mandatory sentence.
- Quintin McShan, a recently retired state police captain and former member of the United States Marine Corps. He currently works as a licensed private investigator and bounty hunter.
- Sheri Ray, a former corrections officer and mother of three children. She is looking to re-enter her career after her husband's return from Afghanistan and learn from the show what changes she can make as she enters her field. After the program, Ray was offered a position at the Clark County Jail to continue her career as a corrections officer.
- Ryan Secord (Kyle Ryan), the youngest participant during this season, at 27 years old. He has a medical background and was a medic in the United States Army Reserves. He aspires to become a police officer and eventually a homicide detective. He opened his own store while in jail in order to make profit, and befriended several of the inmates, particularly Garza and Ricky.

=== Season 3 cast ===
- Mark Adger, colonel at the Fulton County Jail in Atlanta
- Calvin Crosby, a special education teacher at a local Public School. He hopes he will be able to relate to his students on a deeper level and he thinks it may shock them into changing their own behaviors and patterns.
- Don (last name unknown) grew up in the projects of Newark, Delaware. His father and two brothers were all in and out of prison during his youth. As a convicted felon, his father could never find a job, so he continually returned to selling and using drugs. Don believes that the system has failed African Americans. He wants to join the program in order to uncover discrimination, unite the inmates, and learn how to actively fight recidivism and the escalating trends of convicted black men in America.
- Gerson (last name unknown) moved from El Salvador to California when he was seven years old. He went from a civil war to a gang war, living in the Los Angeles area during the 1980s and 90s. He eventually left California and moved to the east coast as he worked to escape the risk of becoming a statistic by his surroundings, including gangs, drugs, and violence. He works as a mentor in schools, colleges and universities. When the program started, Gerson had concerns about it. He called the producer, met him at a hotel, and decided not risk it.
- Jessica Speigner-Page met her husband on an inmate pen pal site, and she was shocked at how institutionalized he was when he was released. After a decade behind bars, he was struggling to reintegrate. His "inmate-like" behavior has been a strain on their relationship. Speigner-Page is determined to understand where these behaviors and instincts of his come from in order to help him, and others who have been recently released, reintegrate into society. She believes this program will help her relate to her husband and strengthen their marriage. However, she left the program early.
- Jon McAdams, a veteran and former law enforcement agent who became disenchanted with the system and now wants to dedicate his professional life to civil rights activism. He plans on starting a nonprofit organization in his conservative town. He wants to "walk the walk" and put his words into action, starting by living among a population he once put behind bars but now wants to serve.
- Matt Michael served in the Marine Corps for four years. He was the honor graduate in his boot camp class, was promoted quickly, and ultimately attained the rank of Sergeant (E-5) in the infantry. He supports law enforcement, but he thinks the system needs a reality check. He believes if one has committed a serious crime, they should do their time.
- Mauri Jackson worked three years as a correctional officer in a men's maximum security facility. As CO, she was shocked by how many incarcerated men and women suffer from mental illness and are on medications while serving out their time behind bars. She is determined to be part of the solution when it comes to prison reform and mental health.
- Michelle Polley is currently working in property management, but has been interested in the criminal justice field all her life. She has taken various classes on criminal justice and criminal law. She hopes to connect with women inside through creating positive activities so they know there is more to life than four concrete walls.
- Nate Burrell served in active duty in the United States Marine Corps from 2006 to 2010 in the infantry, and completed two combat tours in Iraq. He served for three years in the reserves, and was honorably discharged in 2013. Subsequently, he received his associate degree in criminal justice and law enforcement in 2014 in order to become a fish and wildlife officer in Michigan. He decided to remain in custody for an additional 60 days when Colonel Adger offered him the opportunity to do so.

=== Season 4 cast ===
Cast member	Occupation	Cover	Biography	Reference
Mark Adger	Chief Jailer; Colonel of jail	N/A	Returns from Season 3.	
Alan Oliver	Police officer		Entered the program to observe the behaviors of corrections officers	
Andrew Fellows	Substitute teacher		Volunteered to join his father, Matt, in the program.	
Angele Cooper ^{1}	Electrician		Desires to better understand the trauma experienced by those behind bars in order to help in their rehabilitation. Former high school and collegiate track and field athlete ranked among the top ten internationally in the 400m hurdles.	
Emmanuel Buchi	Public health official		Nigerian born, Buchi believes the key to breaking the negative cycle of criminality among African-American men, especially youth, is for leaders like him to foster education, positive self-perception, and a culture of respect within the African-American community. He currently works for California Department of Corrections and is an active speaker at colleges and high schools nationally.	
Jaclin Owen ^{2}	Paralegal		Desires to gain knowledge of the criminal justice system to further her law career.	
Johnny Ramirez	Former gang member		Grew up influenced by gangs. Wanted to experience what his life would have been like if he continued the lifestyle, and to understand his currently incarcerated son.	
Matt Fellows ^{2}	Mixed martial arts trainer and former prison chaplain at Utah State Prison		Brought his son, Andrew, into the program with him.	
Stephanie	Pharmacy tech		Has family members incarcerated; joined the program to understand what they go through.	
Nate Burrell	US Marine		Returns from Season 3. Was offered an extension due to having already established a trustful and positive rapport with the inmates.	

^Note1: Participant was removed for safety concerns and did not complete the program.
^Note2: Jaclin issued the distress signal to be removed, as she overhead the other inmates were gonna attack/jump her.
^Note3: left early and did not complete the program.

=== Season 5 cast ===
Cast member	Occupation	Cover	Biography	Reference
Mark Lamb	Sheriff	N/A	Sheriff of Pinal County	
Steve ^{1}	Private investigator		A seventh participant hired by the sheriff unbeknownst to the others. Meant to serve as a failsafe in case the other participants failed in their missions.	
Brooke	Real estate agent		Has a harsh view on drug addicts due to a family member being one, and hopes her experience in jail will change her point of view.	
David ^{1}	Police officer		Using his investigative skills, David will learn how drugs are getting in and out of jail.	
Abner	Chaplain/former gang member/ex-convict		A former gang member and the first participant to have previously served time in prison. With his past, Abner will be able to easily gain the trust of the other inmates.	
Jazmyn	Single mom and veteran		A radio personality and single mother. Jazmyn is confident that she can figure out how the gangs within the jail operate.	
Vivian	Navy & Army veteran		A former veteran for both the Army and the Navy. Using her background, Vivian will be able to gain the trust of the inmates easily.	
Mark	Former corrections officer/60 Days In superfan		A superfan of 60 Days In. While the sheriff believes he is not cut out for the mission, Mark is confident that his knowledge of the previous seasons and his past as a corrections officer will allow him to succeed.	

=== Season 6 cast ===
Cast member	Occupation	Cover	Biography	Reference
Jonathon Horton	Sheriff	N/A	Sheriff of Etowah County	
Alex^{2}	Political science major/60 Days In superfan		Alex is a political science major and 60 Days In superfan. Having watched every episode of the series, he thinks going to jail will be a nice reprieve from the stresses of college life. He is an avid online gamer with a passion for survival games – he's eager to see if his online role-playing will prove fruitful when he goes behind bars for 60 days.	
Ashley^{1}	Police officer		A small-town Texas police officer and a sergeant in the Army National Guard, Ashley loves her community and is committed to serving and protecting it. While she believes in incarceration, she is concerned with the lack of rehabilitation inside correctional facilities across the country. As an undercover inmate, she will be on a mission to help improve the Etowah County Detention Center from the inside, and she'll focus her efforts on identifying unreported misconduct among both inmates and officers. Having seen every episode of 60 Days In, Ashley considers herself a superfan of the show. She is confident in her ability to navigate life behind bars and prove she is a valuable resource to the Sheriff.	
Dennis	Former college football player		Although he's never been incarcerated, Dennis believes criminals live better lives than law-abiding citizens, and that they should receive harsher punishments for their crimes. He wants to prove that 60 days in jail is an extended vacation, not an incentive for criminals to stay out of trouble.	
Jacob ^{2}	Corrections officer		Jacob has worked as a corrections officer at a SuperMax prison for the past six years and patrolled the facility’s most dangerous pod where an officer was nearly killed by inmates. He is a play-by-the-rules corrections officer who believes policies are meant to keep officers and inmates safe. Though Jacob finds his job rewarding and believes that he is a positive role model to the inmates, he is disheartened by the corruption and complacency of his fellow officers. He is at a crossroads in his career and believes two months of living on the other side of the bars will help him decide whether or not he will continue working as a corrections officer.	
Jennifer	Born-again Christian		Jennifer is passionate about serving people who struggle with mental health issues, and she hopes 60 days in jail will give her the opportunity to mentor troubled inmates and prepare her for a future career in mental health. She also hopes to become an ordained minister after she finishes the program. A devout Christian with conservative values, She wants to be a role model for women and believes no inmate is beyond saving; however, she has no patience for people who make excuses for illegal behavior. Jennifer was a rule-breaking teen who ran away from her parents’ home in Canada and crossed the border into the U.S. She dropped out of high school, experimented with drugs and alcohol, and became a stripper at 14. Afraid she was headed down a dark path, she returned home, where she committed her life to God and became a devoted teenage mom.	
Matt ^{2}	Marine/60 Days In superfan		Matt served in the Marine Corps for four years. He is tough on crime and loves a good mission. Since Season one, this 60 Days In superfan has imagined himself going into jail undercover and has even dreamed up strategies for blending in with the inmate population. He's prepared for older, seasoned inmates to ruffle him up, but he's confident he'll stand his ground and embrace his "fresh-meat" status. Although he's never been to jail, Matt is confident that his experience in the Marine Corps will be an asset, as it has been for past Marines in the program. His strategy is to fly under the radar and prove that the system is creating more criminals than it is deterring them.	
Shanese^{2}	At-risk youth member		Shanese runs alternative programs for at-risk youth and deals with the repercussions of incarceration in her classroom on a daily basis. Many of her students come from broken households where their parents are on drugs, incarcerated or dead. Her students say they'd rather be in jail where they're guaranteed a hot meal and a place to sleep. Shanese is out to prove to her students that she can handle 60 days behind bars, and she's confident that her tough-love upbringing paired with her ability to mentor troubled youth will give her an upper hand at the facility. Dubbed "Ms. Cray Cray" by her students, she will speak her mind, even if it gets her into trouble with fellow inmates.	
Tony	Corrections officer		For the past six years, Tony has served as a detention officer at Atlanta's Fulton County Jail (Seasons 3 and 4). He's confident that his insider knowledge, intense training, and thorough understanding of gang activity and inmate behavior make him the most qualified participant for 60 Days In of all time. He was brought in during Episode 4 after Matt and Jacob dropped out of the program and Dennis almost put the program at risk. Tony returns as a special op for phase 2 due to his exceptional work during Phase 1.	
Donovan	Undercover Narcotics Detective		A narcotics detective with 12 years of experience from Clark County Indiana, the setting of the first two seasons of 60 Days In. Donovan is sent undercover as a special op at Sheriff Jonathon's request.	N/A
Heather	Jail Commander		Commander of Operations at Utah County Jail. With experience as both a boxer and MMA fighter gives Heather the confidence to take care of herself while doing her duties.	N/A
Vanessa	FireFighter/EMT		A Firefighter and corrections officer. Vanessa's past as a corrections officer will allow her to get to know and connect with the other inmates.	N/A
Mark	Retired Sergeant Warrant		A retired sergeant from Philadelphia with 11 years of experience who is confident in his history as a sergeant that he will be able to accomplish the mission the sheriff gave to him.	N/A

=== Season 7 cast ===
Cast member	Occupation	Cover	Biography	Reference
Scandrett	Sheriff	N/A	Sheriff Reginald B. Scandrett is the 29th and first African-American Sheriff to Henry County, Georgia. The inception of his tenure has presented challenges and growing pains. Yet, the many victories have strengthened the resolve of Sheriff Scandrett, his deputies and civilian staff. The Henry County Sheriff’s Office’s philosophy of one team, one mission ensures the implementation of his vision for unifying law enforcement with the community.	
Carlos		Criminal Possession of a Weapon	“Carlos” is a former gang member turned cross-country truck driver. Although he was raised in a strict household, he joined a local gang because he was drawn into the familial aspect of the group and he believed it gave him purpose.	
Jojo aka Lynn		Theft, Drug Possession	Jojo was raised in poverty and lived a life of crime to fuel her drug habit. She spent a combined eight years behind bars for theft, credit card fraud, and drug possession.	
Dontae aka Darius		Armed Robbery	Dontae grew up as a military brat who moved every few years and got into some trouble as a teen. In his early twenties, Dontae served almost ten years in prison for armed robbery. While incarcerated Dontae knew he had to change his outlook on life, or he would not survive the rest of his sentence. He joined educational programs and read books to learn how to be financially successful in the real world.	
Rojonah aka Rose		Tax Fraud	Rojonah served 30 months in federal prison for tax fraud. The mom of seven experienced a total culture shock when she first went to prison and cried herself to sleep every night. After a few months, Rojonah decided she would not let prison break her, and she became the “jailhouse lawyer.”	
Nick aka Tim		Steroid Trafficking	Nick was raised on his family’s cattle farm in rural Georgia and spent Sundays at church. As a kid he stayed out of trouble and enjoyed fishing and swimming in the river. However, when he grew older he succumbed to the allure of fast money and became involved in a multi-state steroid trafficking ring. After years of living a lavish lifestyle he got busted and sent to county jail and eventually federal prison. After serving almost six years behind bars Nick believes incarceration worked for him. The conditions were so horrific, no amount of money could tempt him to risk losing his freedom again. Today, Nick is a semi-retired heavy machine operator, and is the doting father of a six-year-old son.	
Tangie aka Trinity		Aggravated Robbery with a Deadly Weapon	Tangie was raised by her grandmother while her mom was in and out of prison. At age 16, Tangie worked a job so she could put money on her mom’s books. With her grandmother’s support, Tangie earned her bachelor's degree in chemistry. Unfortunately, her dreams of being a chemistry teacher were derailed when she got charged with aggravated robbery. Although she only spent a week in jail, the experience was life changing and she continues to face incarceration-related obstacles eight years later. This inspired Tangie to start her coaching business “Felon to Phenomenal” to help people find employment and rebuild relationships after their release. She is also working on getting her teaching certification and is a successful DJ.	
Chucky aka Chase		Career Criminal	Chucky grew up in the streets of Chicago where committing crimes was a means of survival. Chucky joined a gang at 12 years old, and by 13, he'd been shot and locked up in a juvenile detention center. Raised in “the system,” Chucky experienced the best and worst correctional facilities in his home state of IL and knows firsthand what makes a jail safe or dangerous. After 20 years as a career criminal and a near death experience while dealing drugs, Chucky now strives to be part of the solution rather than the problem.	

=== Season 8 cast ===
Cast member	Occupation	Cover	Biography	Reference
Paula Dance	Sheriff	N/A	Paula Dance is the Sheriff of Pitt County Detention Center.	N/A
Jake	Operations Manager		Jake has a unique perspective of the criminal justice system because he's seen it from both sides. He's had family members work in corrections and law enforcement, as well as loved ones who've served time behind bars. Jake believes in law and order but thinks jails should be a place of rehabilitation instead of punishment.	
Charlotte aka Coco	Stay at Home Mom		Charlotte "Coco" was a hardworking mom whose life got flipped upside down after serving one year in prison. Still working to rebuild herself since getting released nearly seven years ago, Coco is outspoken about the injustices women experience behind bars, and the obstacles individuals face even after they've served their time.	
Cliff aka Jamil	Musician		Growing up in New Jersey, Cliff watched his friends and family members go in and out of the prison system, and share horror stories of the conditions. Cliff has never been incarcerated and credits his supportive family for keeping him out of trouble and encouraging him to excel in school. Cliff has had a couple run-ins with law enforcement, and often wonders how different his life would have been had he been incarcerated. Cliff wants to better understand the challenges his loved ones face behind bars.	
Stevie	Former Co/Personal Bodyguard		Stevie was raised in the crime-ridden streets of San Bernardino, CA. Some of Stevie’s family members were well-known drug dealers, and he remembers their house being raided by the police. After Stevie’s father died, he was taken in by his aunt and uncle, who were probation officers. They helped him to stay out of trouble and get into college on a football scholarship. After graduation, Stevie worked as a Corrections Officer at a state prison, and at a federal halfway house. Stevie thrived in the environment because he could relate to the guys behind bars. He never belittled them, and they respected him for his family’s street cred.	
Sarah aka Sara	Digital Marketer		From drug addiction to PTA soccer mom, Sarah had a spiritual awakening that jump started her recovery journey. Now, she is on a mission to advocate for individuals in active addiction who have been failed by the criminal justice system, and inspire them to get and stay sober, and recreate their life.	
Curtis aka Clydell	Podcaster		Curtis was raised in Sacramento and despite a happy childhood, he was constantly getting into trouble. At the young age of 17, Curtis was arrested for robbery and sentenced to 17 years in prison. The news broke his parents, especially Curtis’s father who is a respected and active member of their community. Young Curtis grew up behind bars, and went into survival mode, making a name for himself as the “shot caller.”	
Brittney	Psychotherapist		Brittney has spent the last 13 years serving young people who struggle with behavioral and mental health disorders. A seasoned psychotherapist of nearly seven years, Brittney has worked in an educational setting and as a juvenile probation officer. Brittney is passionate about mental health treatment behind bars and stopping the school to prison pipeline.	
Orion	Personal Trainer		Orion is a new participant sent in the jail after four of the previous participants have dropped out.	
Kendra	Executive Protection Agent		Kendra is a new participant sent in the jail after four of the previous participants have dropped out.	

=== Season 9 cast ===
Cast member	Occupation	Cover	Biography	Reference
Mike Smith	Sheriff	N/A	Mike Smith is the Sheriff of Utah County Jail.	
Daniel ^{1}	Recovery Advocate		After a years-long battle with drug addiction and several stints in juvenile detention, this former amateur MMA champion fighter had a moment of clarity when he survived a near-fatal overdose. Today, Daniel is the doting father to his daughter and celebrating over seven years of sobriety. Daniel lost almost everything to addiction, but the fighter in him prevailed. He believes jails can work and his mission on 60 Days In is to inform the Sheriff’s team on how to better serve their population.	
Corey ^{2}	Hospitality		After watching his family members get caught in the system of incarceration, Corey is eager to understand the psychology of the revolving door of jail. Corey has never been to jail and began watching 60 Days In during high school. He has waited eight years to prove that he can survive behind bars just as well as the big, strong, tough guys who often sign up for the program.	
Fabian ^{2}	Towing Business Owner		Fabian has battled an internal conflict between good and evil his entire life—as a young adult, he attended church with his family and applied for the police academy, but he participated in a robbery that changed the trajectory of his life. Fabian made the most of his five years in prison, enrolling in every reentry program offered. Since his release in 2013, he has become a family man and business owner. As a former inmate, Fabian knows what it takes to survive 60 days in jail.	
Qwell	Police Officer		Qwell is a police officer in a bustling metropolitan area and in his short time on the force, he has been awarded “Officer of the Month” four times for his proactive police work. Qwell credits his success in community policing to the five years he worked in corrections on Rikers Island, a facility notorious for corruption and violence. Qwell, who served on the Riker’s Emergency Service Unit, has a lot of ideas on how to improve officer safety and sees 60 Days In as an opportunity to finally put his theories into practice.	
Scarlett	Behavioral Health Analyst		Scarlett’s 20-year career as a civil servant began in emergency services dispatch, and has evolved into giving a voice to the voiceless. She has served in a multitude of mental health settings, as well as a child protective and forensic investigator, and juvenile probation officer and court liaison. Eager to bring awareness to the impact of incarceration, Scarlett is volunteering to participate on 60 Days In.	
Nina	Bail Bondswoman		Nina has been in the bail bonds and fugitive recovery business for over a decade; she got her start in the industry while earning her fine arts degree in college. What makes her successful is her passion for seeking justice while also seeing the humanity in her clients. Nina has spent countless hours with individuals who have been incarcerated or are facing jail time, and now she wants to experience it firsthand.	
A.B aka Angel	Law Student		When her teenage brother was tried as an adult and wrongfully convicted of murder, “A.B.” learned how nuanced and unfair the criminal justice system can be. This propelled her to attend law school and become an activist for reform. A proud single mom, she recently took her Bar exam and aspires to work as a post-conviction attorney for wrongful conviction cases. A.B. has never been incarcerated and sees 60 Days In as an opportunity to get inside the minds of her future clients and experience the challenges incarcerated individuals face behind bars, including her brother who is serving a 50-year to life sentence.	
Bryan	Correctional Officer		Bryan has worked in corrections for more than ten years and has witnessed firsthand where the system succeeds and fails. He believes some jails prioritize the comfort of inmates over the safety of officers. Prior to corrections, this proud father of two served ten years in the Army. Always looking to sharpen his C.O. skillset, Bryan sees 60 Days In as the ultimate training experience and is prepared to infiltrate the other side.	

== Episodes ==
=== Season 1 (2016) ===
No. overall	No. in season	Title	Original release date	U.S. viewers (millions)
1	1	"Unusual Suspects"	March 10, 2016	1.16
Seven volunteer civilians become undercover inmates in an effort to root out crime and corruption in Indiana's Clark County Jail.
2	2	"First Timers"	March 10, 2016	1.31
The experimental program begins; the first participants include a Marine, a police officer, a teacher and a stay-at-home mother.
3	3	"Cell Shock"	March 17, 2016	1.62
Maryum, the eldest daughter of boxer Muhammad Ali, joins the program and fits into F-pod effortlessly; the inmates grow suspicious of Robert; a mistake places Zac in peril; Barbra questions her commitment to the experiment.
4	4	"Fight Face"	March 24, 2016	1.77
Isaiah and Robert worry that their covers may be blown; Capt. Maples follows through with consequences after Robert makes a risky move; Zac hunts for illegal drug use in C-pod; Tami clashes with another inmate.
5	5	"Friends Without Benefits"	March 31, 2016	1.71
An unexpected call to court tests Zac's strength as an inmate; Barbra abandons a friendship with Tami in order to survive; a series of catastrophic mistakes endangers Jeff.
6	6	"Full Inmate"	April 7, 2016	1.72
The midway point of the experiment approaches; anger rises among the women of F-Pod; an inmate in C-Pod poses a danger to one of the men.
7	7	"Pod Drama"	April 14, 2016	1.77
Inmate Ricky attacks Jeff, jeopardizing the program; Zac and Isaiah move from the familiar confines of C-Pod to the more violent D-Pod; Barbra feels betrayed by her F-Pod bunkmates; Robert learns that he will return to general population.
8	8	"Shakedown"	April 21, 2016	1.81
The participants cross the halfway point of the experiment; the sheriff orders a raid due to increased tensions and drug activity in D-pod; the residents of F-pod worry about a contagious rash.
9	9	"Alone for the Holidays"	April 28, 2016	1.60
Thanksgiving presents new challenges and opportunities; one of the six remaining participants is pushed to the breaking point.
10	10	"Institutionalized"	May 5, 2016	1.63
The participants near the end of the experiment; the program is compromised when a woman in F-Pod is pushed over the edge; both men in D-Pod struggle to avoid serious criminal activity.
11	11	"11th Hour"	May 12, 2016	1.63
The five remaining participants try to finish up their final days inside jail as pressure builds within the pods.
12	12	"Exodus"	May 19, 2016	1.93
Three participants remain in jail; Tami finds herself on the verge of a meltdown after a woman is released from F-Pod; a power struggle erupts when a boss is removed from D-Pod.
13	13	"The Aftermath"	May 26, 2016	1.34
All seven participants discuss their experiences; the women relive a contentious moment from inside jail; Tami confronts Robert about not taking the program seriously. Hosted by Dan Abrams.

=== Season 2 (2016–17) ===
No. overall	No. in season	Title	Original release date	U.S. viewers (millions)
14	1	"Meet the Participants"	August 18, 2016	0.89
A former corrections officer, a bounty hunter and a young lawyer join others in the new group of innocent civilians selected to secretly live among the general population of Indiana's Clark County Jail.
15	2	"Re-entry"	August 18, 2016	0.91
Phase two of Sheriff Jamey Noel's unprecedented program begins with four new participants entering the Clark County Jail to continue the covert operation designed to root out corruption and contraband.
16	3	"Friend or Foe"	August 25, 2016	1.20
As three new participants enter the program, the others fight for acceptance in the pods. One participant is forced into a confrontation that quickly turns physical.
17	4	"All Pain, No Gain"	September 1, 2016	1.14
The last participant enters the Clark County Jail and all eight must now face their new reality of life behind bars.
18	5	"Hazed and Confused"	September 8, 2016	1.10
Hazing, drug use, and violence envelop Clark County Jail as two participants are on the brink of dropping out of the program.
19	6	"Pod Wars"	September 15, 2016	1.20
All hell breaks loose in the Clark County Jail when two pod bosses threaten the safety of three participants.
20	7	"Criminal Justice"	September 22, 2016	1.28
While trying to survive constant harassment, violence, and the stress of incarceration, the participants continue to grind out their time in the Clark County Jail. But two of them are reaching a tipping point and for them everything is about to change.
21	8	"Dangerous Loyalty"	September 29, 2016	1.24
The remaining six participants face turning points; Ashleigh has a life-altering realization; Quintin and Sheri feel conflicted as they go deep under cover; Monalisa and Dion realize that they cannot escape their pasts.
22	9	"Institutional Knowledge"	October 6, 2016	1.21
New challenges arise after the men switch pods; the women suspect a snitch in their midst.
23	10	"Sewer Gate"	October 13, 2016	1.20
Ryan, Quintin and the other inmates of C-Pod wake up to raw sewage spewing out of their floor drain; as the odious situation threatens to invade F-Pod, the jail's water supply is shut off.
24	11	"Trouble in Store"	October 20, 2016	1.08
Following the repair of the sewer line, the participants return to their pods only to encounter new challenges and threats.
25	12	"Blood, Sweat and Tears"	October 27, 2016	1.19
Tension runs high in the pods as the six remaining participants enter their final days in the Clark County Jail.
26	13	"Bed and Baggage"	November 3, 2016	1.21
The three remaining participants gather evidence; conflict is narrowly avoided before names are called.
27	14	"The Aftermath: Part Two"	November 10, 2016	0.89
Following the end of the program, the eight participants meet with Sheriff Noel and Capt. Maples to discuss their journey as inmates and what they discovered while in the Clark County Jail.
28	15	"The Full Story—Ashleigh, Sheri, Chris, Ryan"	February 23, 2017	N/A
29	16	"The Full Story—Dion, Brian, Monalisa, Quintin"	February 23, 2017	N/A
30	17	"Where Are They Now?"	February 23, 2017	N/A
After serving time in the dangerous world of the Clark County Jail, all 8 participants gave us an update after 60 days in. Ryan tells Garza the truth about the program. Also, Dion was engaged to his fiancé Ashlee and Brian, Chris, Ryan, Monalisa, Quintin and Sheri celebrate with them.

=== Season 3 (2017) ===
No. overall	No. in season	Title	Original release date	U.S. viewers (millions)
31	1	"Fulton County Jail: Welcome to the A-T-L"	March 2, 2017	1.10
The participants who infiltrate Atlanta's Fulton County Jail for this season include a special education who works as at-risk youth, a wife of a former convict, a marine, a criminal justice student and a youth mentor.
32	2	"Truth or Dare"	March 9, 2017	1.10
The first five participants enter the Fulton County Jail and are immediately met with drug use, sexual behavior, and what it feels like to be locked in a cell for 12 hours. Gerson decided not to do the program. Don and Calvin begin to enter the jail but in different sections of the jail.
33	3	"Trust Issues"	March 16, 2017	0.82
As participants settle into Fulton County Jail and Nate enters into the jail. Inmate suspicions and power-plays keep everyone on the edge.
34	4	"Cellies"	March 23, 2017	0.93
A violent fight in the women's pod in South Annex just 45 minutes away from the main jail. A power outage in pod 600 causes extended lockdowns, proving that the luck of the draw with cell mates can make or break the experience in jail. Meanwhile, The final participant Matt enters the Fulton County Jail.
35	5	"Dangerous Liaisons"	March 30, 2017	1.02
The participants face difficult obstacles and must make risky alliances as they struggle to survive life on the inside.
36	6	"Vulnerable Positions"	April 6, 2017	0.88
A flood in the Fulton County Jail's South Annex, escalating problems with cellmates, and respect issues push the participants to the brink of despair.
37	7	"Tapping Out"	April 13, 2017	0.80
Suspicions surround the male participants; the women struggle to continue, as one considers dropping out of the program.
38	8	"Bloods Rising"	April 20, 2017	0.96
The participants at Atlanta's Fulton County Jail learn that small mistakes can have big consequences; the Bloods in 500 continue to grow more powerful.
39	9	"Code Red"	April 27, 2017	0.86
Inmates escape their restraints during a chaotic mass evacuation drill in 500; Mauri and Michelle are placed in a vulnerable position after a rumor spreads about the program in the women's pod.
40	10	"The Marine Test"	April 27, 2017	0.81
An uproar in Zone 500 results when an inmate claims to be a Marine, Jon is taken advantage of by a new inmate with the same name, and Michelle gets caught in the middle of a drug deal gone wrong.
41	11	"High Times"	May 4, 2017	0.87
Participants Matt and Michelle face tough choices regarding drug use that put their safety, and time in the program, at risk.
42	12	"Atlanta: In or Out? Part 1"	May 11, 2017	0.89
The participants endure their final days at the Fulton County Jail; one of them has to make the tough decision to stay another 60 days.
43	13	"Atlanta: In or Out? Part 2"	May 11, 2017	0.89
The participants endure their final days at the Fulton County Jail; one of them has to make the tough decision to stay another 60 days.
44	14	"Atlanta: The Aftermath"	May 18, 2017	0.61
The eight participants from Season 3 come together with Col. Mark Adger to discuss how they assimilated, survived and navigated the challenges of being an inmate at the Fulton County Jail. Calvin and Mauri and others were not pleased with the fact that Gerson back down cause he thought the program was still in the Clark County Jail but it was in the Fulton County Jail and he explains it. Also, a sneak peek of the participants in Season 4 of 60 Days In.

=== Season 4 (2018) ===
No. overall	No. in season	Title	Original release date	U.S. viewers (millions)
45	1	"The Beginning of the End"	January 1, 2018	0.64
With two participants already inside the jail and three more entering, phase two will shatter expectations, open old wounds, and put everyone's safety in jeopardy.
46	2	"Shank Anxiety"	January 4, 2018	0.96
As the Phase Two participants settle into Fulton County Jail and new ones enter, inmate feuds and power-plays bring participants face to face with real danger and real charges.
47	3	"Pissed Off"	January 11, 2018	1.10
In I-Pod, Jaclin begins to alienate the officers, inmates and her fellow participant, Stephanie, who decides to plot against her. Meanwhile, Zone 500 is raided for contraband after Alan's roommate makes a shank, and Matt is at odds with his roommate Lawrence in Zone 600, and fears he may have to fight him.
48	4	"Party Favors"	January 18, 2018	0.88
The participants toe the line between blowing their cover or going full inmate, all the while trying to stay focused on their purpose in the midst of wild parties and difficult cellmates. The inmates in Nate's pod celebrate his birthday in jail.
49	5	"Jail Crush"	January 25, 2018	0.89
While Stephanie chooses to use drugs to bond with her fellow inmates, Jaclin finds acceptance by creating her own jail clothing line, bringing pink flare and positivity to the inmates of I-Pod, but causing heated confrontations with the officers.
50	6	"Blood Rules"	February 1, 2018	0.85
The participants are faced with challenges when a gas scare happens in the women's pod, a football kitty goes missing in 500 prompting a gang fight, and a new inmate in 600 tests Matt.
51	7	"Sexual Preference"	February 8, 2018	0.79
When Jaclin tries to help Stephanie switch rooms, it puts a target on Jaclin's back, Emmanuel also becomes a target when he tries to break up a fight, and a rumor about Andrew being gay could put him in harm's way.
52	8	"See Nothing, Say Nothing"	February 15, 2018	0.81
Jaclin and Matt both struggle with the decision to leave the program early, while the rest try to keep their wits as they finish the back half of the program. Jaclin decides to leave the program while Matt is still undecided.
53	9	"Nachos, Strippers, Whippit"	February 22, 2018	0.83
Matt wrestles with the most devastating moment of his life. Alan gets a mysterious new cellmate, and the inmates in the South Annex Jail throw an unforgettable birthday party for Angele. Meanwhile Jaclin returns to the jail to tell them about her experience. After that, she is sent home. Matt makes his final decision to leave the program.
54	10	"The Inmate Who Loved Me"	March 1, 2018	0.85
Alan is not sure he can continue in the program after his emotions begin effecting his resolve, Nate expands his meth investigation, and Johnny confronts an inmate on his lack of respect and attitude towards a female prison guard. Meanwhile in the South Annex Angele becomes more infatuated with a fellow inmate and reveals that she may have done something that impacts the entire program, potentially placing all participants at risk.
55	11	"Cover Blown"	March 8, 2018	0.93
In the South Annex, Angele reveals to the producers and Stephanie that she has disclosed her undercover status to Gabrielle a fellow inmate not in the program and is immediately removed from the program by Colonel Adger for safety concerns while they evaluate the situation. In the Men's Facility, Alan sets up a buy to purchase meth being smuggled into the prison, and Johnny begins to sense repercussions from his confrontation in the previous episode. Even though Angele believed Gabrielle would not disclose her undercover status to the other inmates, after her sudden removal this information is revealed. Colonel Adger tells Angele of this fact and immediately decides all participants should be removed for their own safety.
56	12	"Get Them Out"	March 15, 2018	1.03
Colonel Adger races against the clock to safely remove all the participants from Fulton County Jail.
57	13	"The Aftermath"	March 22, 2018	0.85
After the most shocking finale in the program's history, all nine participants sit down with Journalist Soledad O' Brien and Colonel Mark Adger to discuss their experiences at the jail.
58	14	"Six Months Later: Where Are They Now?"	March 26, 2018	0.51
Catching up with the series' most controversial group of participants six months after the Season 4 program at the Fulton County Jail ends.

=== Season 5 (2019) ===
No. overall	No. in season	Title	Original release date	U.S. viewers (millions)
59	1	"New Sheriff in Town"	January 3, 2019	1.24
Newly elected Sheriff Mark Lamb sends six volunteers into the Pinal County Detention Center on a mission to uncover valuable intelligence about the gangs, drugs and operational issues that plague his facility.
60	2	"Straight Cholo"	January 10, 2019	1.01
With three participants in the jail and two more on their way in, Sheriff Lamb's mission-based program is off to the races.
61	3	"It's About to Get Ugly"	January 17, 2019	0.98
With all seven participants embedded in the facility, some struggle to maintain their distance from one another; one participant threatens to bring the whole program to an abrupt end.
62	4	"Y'All Thought I Was Nice"	January 24, 2019	1.05
As the participants begin to focus on their missions, some find early success while others are met with immediate interference; Sheriff Lamb is forced to make a tough decision.
63	5	"Liars and Thieves"	January 31, 2019	1.05
The participants are tested by thieves and the racial politics of jail, forcing them to become either targets and victims, or threats and aggressors.
64	6	"Smells Like A Rat"	February 7, 2019	0.93
David climbs the ranks in the pod, and struggles to remember what side he is on; Abner is tested when one of his own commits an offense; the woman suspect that they are being unfairly targeted by the DOs.
65	7	"Don't Swing First"	February 14, 2019	0.91
More than halfway through their time in jail, the participants struggle to make progress on their missions; as pod drama boils over, some hit their breaking point.
66	8	"Pick A Side"	February 21, 2019	0.96
The participants struggle with race politics, jailhouse thieves, and protecting their cover stories; the secrets become too difficult for one participant to keep.
67	9	"Loose Lips Sink Ships"	February 28, 2019	1.17
The Sheriff and his team face a tough decision; the consequences of one participant's actions put the remaining participants in very real danger.
68	10	"You Don't Belong Here"	March 7, 2019	1.18
When a participant's cover is blown, Sheriff Lamb and his team must decide whether to end the program early or risk the lives of the remaining participants.
69	11	"Season 5 Reunion"	March 14, 2019	N/A
For the first time, all seven participants meet with the sheriff and his team to discuss the craziest moments from their time in the Pinal County Jail.

=== Season 6 (2020) ===
No. overall	No. in season	Title	Original release date	U.S. viewers (millions)
70	1	"Should Have Stayed a Fan"	January 2, 2020	0.94
When newly-elected Sheriff Jonathan W. Horton takes office and finds his jail in dire need of reform, he enlists the help of seven innocent civilians to go undercover as inmates to uncover intel on the issues that plague the facility in order to clean up the Etowah County Detention Center.
71	2	"Full Frontal"	January 9, 2020	0.94
With five participants already embedded in the jail, one of them drops out as others give the distress signal, leaving the Sheriff and his team wondering if completing the 60 Days In program is even possible at this facility.
72	3	"Fresh Meat"	January 16, 2020	1.06
As the last two participants enter the Etowah County Detention Center, many of the others struggle to remain in the program.
73	4	"Program In Peril"	January 23, 2020	0.93
With multiple participants already tapped out and another breaking all the rules, the program at the Etowah County Detention Center is at risk of failure, forcing Sheriff Horton and Chief Peek to take drastic measures.
74	5	"Mother's Day Mayhem"	January 30, 2020	0.92
On Mother’s Day, the women in the female pod are blindsided by a returning officer, while a new participant enters the men’s pod in an attempt to save the program.
75	6	"Squat and Cough"	February 6, 2020	0.89
Following the events of Mother’s Day, Ashley, Shanese and Jennifer struggle against demons of all kinds, while the men are challenged by new cellmates.
76	7	"Stabbed"	February 13, 2020	0.81
As Alex reaches a turning point, Ashley and Jennifer turn on Shanese while a competition develops between Dennis and another participant.
77	8	"Shanks and Signals"	February 20, 2020	1.04
The remaining participants are left reeling after an inmate is shanked at the Etowah County Detention Center, and one more drops out of the program.
78	9	"They Know"	February 27, 2020	1.07
With only four participants left, the remaining men vie for status in the pod, but Ashley fears the female inmates know she’s a police officer, forcing Sheriff Horton and Chief Peek to make a difficult decision.
79	10	"Was It Enough?"	March 5, 2020	1.02
Tony and Dennis try to get their hands on drugs, while Jennifer strives to save a troubled inmate. But will they have enough information for Sheriff Horton to fix his broken facility?
80	11	"Special Ops"	March 12, 2020	1.06
Etowah County was the most challenging jail in “60 Days In” history, with the phase one participants gathering more information than ever before. Now, in an unexpected move, Sheriff Horton is sending five additional participants into the facility for 30 days to see how far the facility has come.
81	12	"Let's Talk About Mark"	March 19, 2020	1.21
As the last two participants embed in the facility, reality sets in for the special ops team and Tony gets right back to work.
82	13	"Girls Next Door"	March 26, 2020	1.18
Heather and Vanessa are left reeling after two violent situations are mishandled by the officers, while Tony and Donovan get to work searching for drugs and contraband.
83	14	"Champagne on Ice"	April 2, 2020	1.12
Tony butts heads with another pod boss, Donovan continues his quest for chew, Vanessa gets a dangerous new cellmate, and Heather’s relationship with Betsy escalates.
84	15	"Pushed to the Limit"	April 9, 2020	1.22
While Donovan and Tony push well outside their comfort zone, the women witness things that bring them both to tears.
85	16	"Moment of Truth"	April 16, 2020	N/A
With the program winding down and suspicions on the rise, Sheriff Horton performs one final shakedown to gauge how far his jail has come since he first took office.
86	17	"The Aftermath: Part One"	April 23, 2020	N/A
The Phase One participants reunite to relive their time in the Etowah County Detention Center, air grievances, and find out who really had each other’s back.
87	18	"The Aftermath: Part Two"	April 30, 2020	N/A
The Phase Two participants revisit their time in the Etowah County Detention Center, and Tony must answer to both Phase One and Phase Two for some of his more questionable deeds.

=== Season 7 (2022) ===
No. overall	No. in season	Title	Original release date	U.S. viewers (millions)
88	0	"Top 20 Moments"	August 11, 2022	N/A
Dan Abrams takes us through a look back at the past six seasons, counting down the top 20 most unforgettable moments of 60 Days In.
89	1	"Re-incarcerated"	August 18, 2022	N/A
A new breed of participants enter the program and encounter unprecedented challenges in Sheriff Scandrett's jail.
90	2	"Twenty-Three And One"	August 25, 2022	N/A
As new participants enter the Henry County Jail, they discover that the conditions in the quarantine pods are far harsher then their previous experiences in jail.
91	3	"Quarantine Chaos"	September 1, 2022	N/A
Sheriff Scandrett faces a challenge when the conditions of the quarantine pods take a serious toll on the participants that risk the success of the program.
92	4	"General Population"	September 15, 2022	N/A
The first participants move to general population and begin to form bonds with new inmates, while others hit their breaking point in quarantine. They quickly learn that the men’s quarantine pod is active at night while dealing with poor conditions during the day. The women’s quarantine pod continues to have medical emergencies with a slow response time from the officers and medical staff.
93	5	"The Gambit"	September 22, 2022	N/A
Arriving at the limits of his patience and sanity, Chase makes a big decision. Carlos makes a run for access and status in the pod by opening up his own "store", and takes Nick, a young inmate, as a protégé, and maneuvers around a serious threat. Darius also finds himself mentoring a young man in serious need of guidance, and later deals with a flood in the pod. Rose navigates her own emotions as she tries to find balance in gen-pop. Trinity grieves the loss of a family member and moves to a new pod.
94	6	"Pain, Pads & Police"	September 29, 2022	N/A
General population proves to be no walk in the park as the participants deal with shake downs, a flooded pod, unwanted attention, and dirty laundry.
95	7	"Who Runs the Pod?"	October 6, 2022	N/A
A new inmate enters the men's pod and begins rustling everyone's feathers. Darius and Carlos work together to protect the pod and keep the peace. Rose attempts to help a rambunctious inmate who has been rubbing her the wrong way and both women are left scratching their heads as the women's pod discovers an unfortunate infestation.
96	8	"Inmate or Civilian"	October 13, 2022	N/A
Rose grapples with devastating news while Trinity encourages the women to find positive ways to express themselves. Darius coaches the men on how to make money, legally on the outside. The return of another inmate causes turmoil within the pod, that "pod boss", Carlos, squashes immediately. However, with his status and ability to make trades through commissary, Carlos begins to revert back to his old prison mentality.
97	9	"Never Going Back"	October 20, 2022	N/A
Carlos learns why he was removed from the program early. As the last man standing, Darius struggles to keep peace in the pod. The serenity within the women's pod is shattered when a minor argument takes a violent turn and in the midst of the chaos, Rose tries to help a depressed inmate. The three remaining participants complete their incarcerations and meet with the Sheriff to debrief him on the problems they discovered.
98	10	"The Aftermath: Part One"	October 27, 2022	N/A
When the participants reunite to discuss the highs and lows of their re-incarceration in the Henry County Jail, explosive arguments erupt within the group. Soledad O'Brien hosts.
99	11	"The Aftermath: Part Two"	October 27, 2022	N/A
The participants press Sheriff Scandrett and his team on the difficult conditions they endured during their time in the Henry County Jail, and Shaquille O'Neal makes a surprise appearance.

=== Season 8 (2023) ===
No. overall	No. in season	Title	Original release date	U.S. viewers (millions)
100	1	"Before the 60 Days"	June 8, 2023	0.38
One month before participants enter Pitt County Detention, inmates and staff explain what life is like inside the jail.
101	2	"Welcome to Pitt County"	June 15, 2023	0.49
The first three Participants enter Pitt County Detention Center in North Carolina to begin their 60 Days inside the jail.
102	3	"Ready, Set, Nope!"	June 22, 2023	0.52
As two more participants enter Pitt County Detention Center, some may already be wavering on their commitment to make it through quarantine.
103	4	"Welcome to Gen Pop"	June 29, 2023	0.58
Jamil and Steven enter general population, and as a new volunteer enters the Pitt County Detention Center, another participant questions their decision to continue with the program.
104	5	"You Could Die in a Place Like This"	July 6, 2023	N/A
Suspicions mount and pressure builds as the participants try to focus on their missions and keep their cover.
105	6	"Sheriff... We Have a Problem"	July 13, 2023	N/A
Chaos ensues in both the men's and the women's pods, leaving sheriff Dance concerned with the state of the program.
106	7	"New Clown, Same Circus"	July 21, 2023	N/A
Sheriff Dance meets the two new volunteers before Orion enters the program. Jamil and Drip go head to head while constant aggression in the woman's pod force Brittany and Sara try to find a solution.
107	8	"Mama Didn't Raise No Punk Bitch"	July 30, 2023	N/A
The last new participant Kendra embeds while Orion loses his cool with a CO. Accusations of stealing leads to chaos within the women's pod and one participant seemingly gives up on the mission.
108	9	"Pill Trades, Drug Raids"	August 3, 2023	0.43
The remaining participants encounter obstacles while trying to fulfill their missions as drugs run rampant throughout PCDC, resulting in a full shakedown.
109	10	"One Pill Too Many"	August 10, 2023	0.60
Orion moves to a new pod and is forced to make a tough choice, Jamil faces an old foe, Brittany loses her patience with Candace, a vicious fight breaks out between two inmates which affects Kendra and Brittany, while Sara's new roommate threatens the sobriety of the pod.
110	11	"To The Bitter End"	August 17, 2023	0.51
As each participant nears the end of the program, Jamil tries a new tactic, Brittany reconciles with her roomie, Orion's old cellmate gets into a brutal fight, and Officers raid one cell, which pleases Kendra, but puts Sara in the crosshairs.
111	12	"After the 60 Days: Part One"	August 24, 2023	0.47
After the remaining participant leaves the program, the Sheriff and her staff process how to implement the feedback as the inmates continue serving their time.
112	13	"After the 60 Days: Part Two"	August 31, 2023	0.45
The participants have left the program, cameras remain to document changes being implemented throughout Pitt County Detention Center, and the raid expands to the men's unit which takes the inmates by surprise.
113	14	"The Aftermath: Part One"	September 7, 2023	N/A
In part one of the season 8 reunion, sparks fly and tempers flare as host Mona Scott-Young grills the original six participants, who reunite with Sheriff Dance and Chief Capehart for the first time since leaving the 60 Days In program.
114	15	"The Aftermath: Part Two"	September 14, 2023	N/A
In part two of the season 8 reunion, Orion and Kendra are revealed to everyone and tensions boil over when Jacob goes head to head with the other participants. Sheriff Dance and Chief Capehart reveal what lies ahead for PCDC.

=== Season 9 (2024) ===
No. overall	No. in season	Title	Original release date	U.S. viewers (millions)
115	1	"No Tap Outs"	May 30, 2024	N/A
Sheriff Mike Smith prepares seven volunteers to go inside the Utah County Jail to reveal all the problems that, until now, have been out of sight.
116	2	"Cover Story Chaos"	June 6, 2024	N/A
The first three participants enter Utah County Jail to begin their 60 days undercover.
117	3	"You Thought You Had A Friend"	June 13, 2024	N/A
Scarlett, Daniel, and Corey try to find their way in the Utah County Jail. Daniel makes careless mistakes that could put him in danger, while Scarlett is troubled by a bossy trustee. Corey's sexuality becomes a source of conflict but a new cellmate in Gen Pop offers him acceptance. And while newcomer Nina is at risk of not taking jail seriously enough, ex-con Fabian remembers the horrors of jail all too well.
118	4	"Tooth Crack Down"	June 21, 2024	N/A
Three more participants enter general population as Corey's dental distress sends him over the edge.
119	5	"Complimentary Shanks & Lockdowns"	June 27, 2024	N/A
The team struggles to adapt to life inside and as the final participant enters the jail, the pact is already broken.
120	6	"Jail Lunacy"	July 11, 2024	N/A
The desolate reality of jail continues to challenge the team, causing a second participant to give the emergency signal.
121	7	"The Lost Clippers"	July 19, 2024	N/A
As the team continues its time in jail, some participants navigate their new surroundings while another finds it too much to handle.
122	8	"Celly Suspicions"	July 26, 2024	N/A
Conflicts with inmates and growing suspicion spells trouble for the team, and one participant is moved out of the pod.
123	9	"Surging Suspicions"	August 1, 2024	N/A
As a new participant enters the jail, the rest of the team is at their breaking point, which leads to a dangerous discovery.
124	10	"I'm An Inmate Now"	August 9, 2024	N/A
The Sheriff's team takes unprecedented measures to protect Daniel when his true identity is discovered by the deputies, while Qwell discovers inmates are hiding substances in the greenhouse, and an incident in the women's pod causes Nina and Scarlett to sever their bond as teammates.
125	11	"Boundaries and Thorns"	August 15, 2024	N/A
With the end of the program drawing near, the participants struggle to tie up loose ends, fend off suspicion, and face real problems in the jail.
126	12	"Goodbye Tour"	August 15, 2024	N/A
After the remaining participants are released, they meet with Sheriff Smith and his team to discuss their time inside the Utah County Jail and find out which team members finished the program.
127	13	"The Aftermath"	August 22, 2024	N/A
Now that all the participants have left, they sit down with the Sheriff and his team to reflect on necessary changes they hope will be made at the Utah County Jail.
128	14	"Top 50 of 60"	August 30, 2024	N/A
For nine gripping seasons, "60 Days In" has sent brave participants undercover in some of America's most dangerous jails. We are counting down the top 50 participants to ever get locked up for the "60 Days In" program!

== Reception ==
Amy Amatangelo of The Hollywood Reporter gave the first season of the show a positive review, calling it "fascinating and frightening" and "eye-opening." Brian Lowry of Variety gave a mixed review, criticizing Sheriff Jamey Noel and the participants but praising the show "creating tension in conjuring the threat of violence." Andy Dehnart of Reality Blurred gave the first season an extremely negative review, calling the show's premise "flimsy" and "ludicrous," and criticizing the show's characterization of men's pod participant Robert.

=== Controversy ===
60 Days In has garnered controversy over its alleged fabrication of events portrayed in the show. In 2021, Season 1 participant Robert Holcomb accused the show of heavily editing content for the show, stating, "The show made inmates look like animals; in reality they were kind human beings suffering from drug problems." DiAundré Newby, a Clark County Jail inmate featured in season 1, accused the show of editing an altercation between him and another inmate to fit a narrative surrounding Robert.

Alan, a Season 4 participant, quit his job as a police officer in Texas after appearing on the show, stating, "I couldn't go to bed at night knowing that if I stopped somebody with a little dime bag of weed, I were to arrest them and put them in a place like that — I wouldn't be able to live with myself."

On October 31, 2020, Nate Burrell, a Season 3 and 4 participant, died by suicide in Allegan, Michigan, after being charged with five felony charges of rape and assault.
