= Salt River Police Department =

Law enforcement agency of the Seminole Nation

Agency overview
- Formed: 1967
- Employees: 216

Jurisdictional structure
- Operations jurisdiction: USA
- Map of Salt River Police Department's jurisdiction
- General nature: Local civilian police

Operational structure
- Headquarters: Scottsdale, Arizona
- Police Officers: 159
- Civilians: 57
- Agency executive: Walter Holloway, Chief of Police

Website
- srpmic-nsn.gov/government/srpd/

The Salt River Police Department (SRPD) is the law enforcement agency on the Salt River Pima–Maricopa Indian Community in Arizona. It is headed by a Chief of Police, five Commanders, ten Lieutenants and nineteen Sergeants.

== History ==
The Salt River Police Department (SRPD) transitioned from early federal oversight by the Bureau of Indian Affairs into a fully autonomous law enforcement agency serving the Salt River Pima-Maricopa Indian Community (SRPMIC). The department expanded from a small security force into a CALEA-accredited organization equipped with specialized investigative and tactical units, while maintaining respect for the cultural traditions of the Akimel O’odham (Pima) and Xalychidom Piipaash (Maricopa) tribes.

== Ranks ==
| Rank | Chief of Police | Commander | Lieutenant | Sergeant | Police officer |
| Insignia | | | | | No insignia |

== Fallen officers ==
- Officer Jair A. Cabrera – May 24, 2014
- Officer Clayton J. Townsend – January 8, 2019

== See Also ==
- Pima County Sheriff's Department
- Maricopa County Sheriff's Office
- List of law enforcement agencies in Arizona
