= Pro V&V =

- Type: Private
- Founded: 2011
- Headquarters: Huntsville, Alabama, US
- Key people: Jack Cobb (president and director)
- Website: www.provandv.com

Pro V&V is a voting system test laboratory. They are based in Huntsville, Alabama, and their president and director is Jack Cobb. As of 2021, Pro V&V, along with SLI Compliance, are one of only two organizations that the U.S. Election Assistance Commission has authorized to certify voting systems in the United States.

== History and activities ==
Cobb stated that the company was founded in 2011, and as of 2021 has 12 employees and two contractors. Cobb had previously worked for Ciber as a project manager until 2007, as well as Wyle Laboratories. According to the company's Form D filed with the U.S. Securities and Exchange Commission, Pro V&V had one investor who provided $200,000.

They were accredited by the EAC in 2015. According to the EAC, Pro V&V did not have an updated certification between 2017 and 2019 due to an "administrative error", but stated that the company was in "good standing", undergoing audits in 2018 and 2021. The Arizona Republic reported that Cobb stated that the problem was "political". The company was re-certified in February 2021.

In addition to the United States federal government, Pro V&V has also worked with COMELEC in the Philippines since 2018. Pro V&V worked on the source code for the software system used for counting overseas votes in the 2025 Philippine general election, the first in the country to use Internet voting. Cobb dismissed concerns about votes potentially being hacked, but acknowledged that the system was not "hack-proof", stating "we still got time on our side because these things are not going to be deployed... They don't have enough time to learn it, and if they do learn it, the digital keys next election will be totally different. The encryption will be totally different".

In a 2020 U.S. District Court case, the judge wrote in the court order that Cobb "does not have any specialized expertise in cybersecurity testing or analysis or cybersecurity risk analysis. Further, Mr. Cobb had not personally done any of the security testing referenced in his affidavits." He confirmed to The Arizona Republic that he is not a cybersecurity expert.

Pro V&V had over $500,000 in loans from the Paycheck Protection Program forgiven. The loans were issued by Synovus.

Clay Parikh testified on behalf of Kari Lake's attempt to overturn the 2022 Arizona gubernatorial election and had also spoken at an election denial summit hosted by Mike Lindell. Parikh stated in a court declaration that he worked for voting machine testing labs between 2008 and 2017, including Pro V&V.

SMART Elections (a nonpartisan election integrity advocacy group that includes academics and activists) noted that Pro V&V had approved software and hardware updates for Dominion and Election Systems & Software voting systems between March and September 2024, categorizing those updates as de minimis, which do not require testing. SMART Elections warned that this lack of testing for what it described as comprehensive updates risked malware entering the voting systems. SMART Elections stated that, since at least July 2024, the website for Pro V&V had error messages, and by February 2025, the site had been nonfunctional. Newsweek reported in June 2025 that Cobb had denied these allegations.

== See also ==
- SLI Compliance
- Dominion Voting Systems
