= SLI Compliance =

SLI Compliance is an American voting system test laboratory. They were accredited by the US Election Assistance Commission (EAC) in 2007. As of 2021, SLI, along with Pro V&V, are one of only two organizations that the EAC has authorized to certify voting systems in the United States. Certification from the EAC had expired in January 2021, but the EAC said that they were in good standing, with their re-accreditation delayed due to the COVID-19 pandemic and "resource challenges". SLI was re-certified the next month.

SLI was founded in 1997 in Wheat Ridge, Colorado, and are a division of Gaming Laboratories (GLI), a New Jersey-based company founded in 1989 that tests and validates gambling equipment. In July 2025, it was announced that CVC Capital Partners was preparing to acquire GLI.
