= Steve Gaynor =

American businessman and political candidate

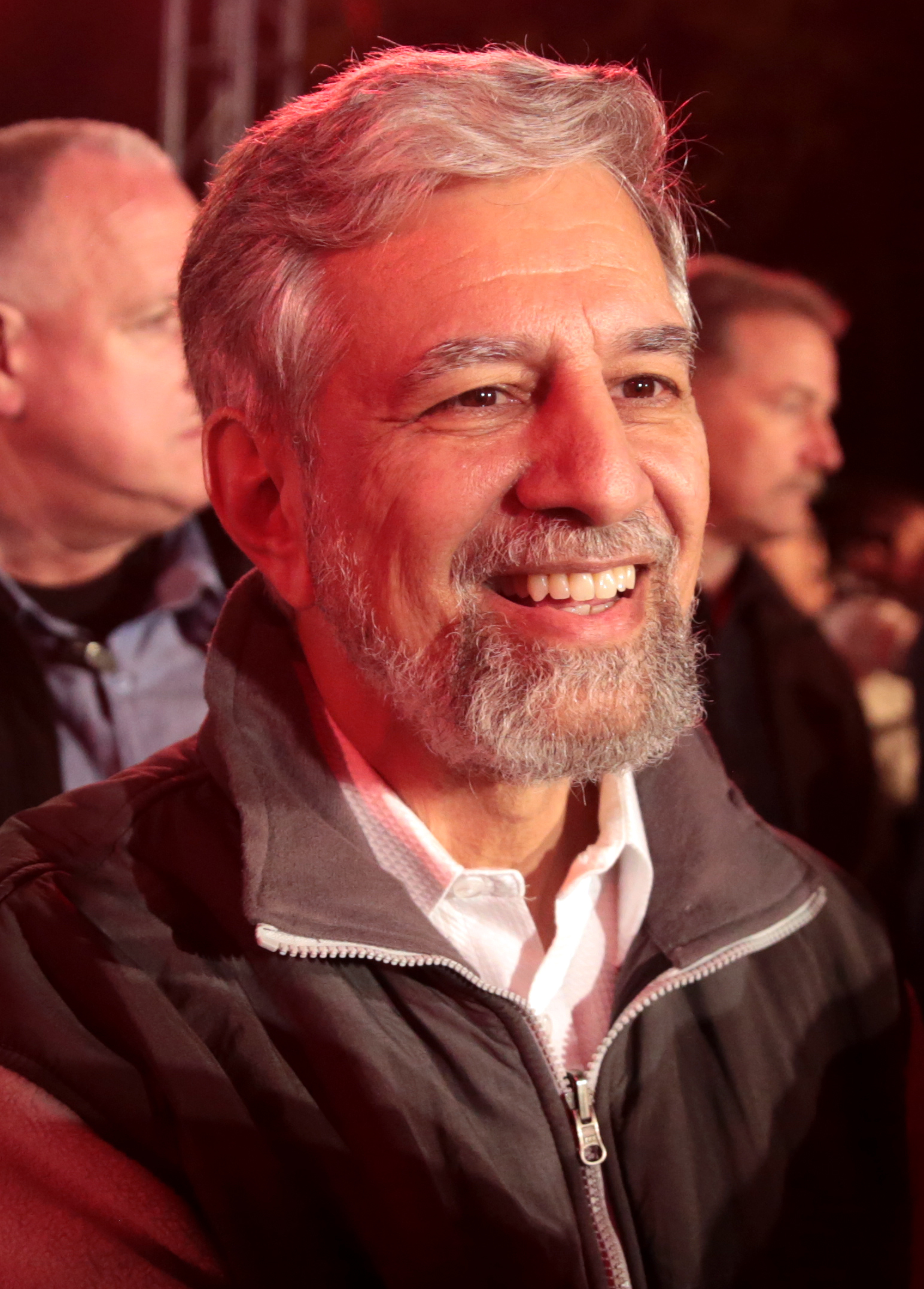

Personal details
- Born: April 27, 1955 (age 71) New York, U.S.
- Party: Republican
- Spouse: Dorothy Gaynor
- Education: Swarthmore College (BA); Harvard University (MBA)

Steven Jeffrey Gaynor is an American businessman and political candidate in Arizona. He ran for Secretary of State of Arizona in 2018, and won the Arizona Republican Party nomination, but narrowly lost the general election to Democrat Katie Hobbs. Gaynor was a candidate in the Republican primary for the 2022 Arizona gubernatorial election before he withdrew from the race in April 2022.

== Early life and education ==
Gaynor is originally from New York. He graduated with an MBA from Harvard Business School. Gaynor is Jewish.

== Business career ==
Gaynor moved to Arizona in 1981 and purchased a small printing company which he grew to employ 350 people by 2007. In 2014 his printing company paid $134,000 to settle claims of underpaid workers.

== Political career ==
In 2018 he ran as the Arizona Republican Party for Secretary of State of Arizona, defeating Michelle Reagan for the nomination. He lost the general election narrowly to the Democratic candidate Katie Hobbs. The race was so close that numerous media outlets, including the Associated Press, reported Gaynor as the winner. Gaynor ultimately conceded to Hobbs 11 days after the election.

In 2019 Gaynor founded of Fair Maps Arizona, a 501(c)(4) organization that has supported Republican political efforts in Arizona.

On June 25, 2021, Gaynor declared his candidacy for the 2022 Arizona gubernatorial election as a Republican.

=== Political positions ===
Gaynor has been described as a social and fiscal conservative. He is reportedly pro-life, and is a lifetime member of the National Rifle Association of America.

=== Electoral history ===
Arizona Secretary of State Republican Primary Election, 2018
Party	Candidate	Votes	%
Republican	Steve Gaynor	414,332	66.7
Republican	Michele Reagan	206,988	33.3

Arizona Secretary of State General Election, 2018
Democratic	Katie Hobbs	1,176,384	50.43
Republican	Steve Gaynor	1,156,132	49.56

== Personal life ==
Gaynor is married to his wife Dorothy, whom he met while studying at Harvard. Together they have three children.
