= 2022 Arizona gubernatorial election =

- November 8, 2022
- Turnout: 62.6% ▼2.29 pp
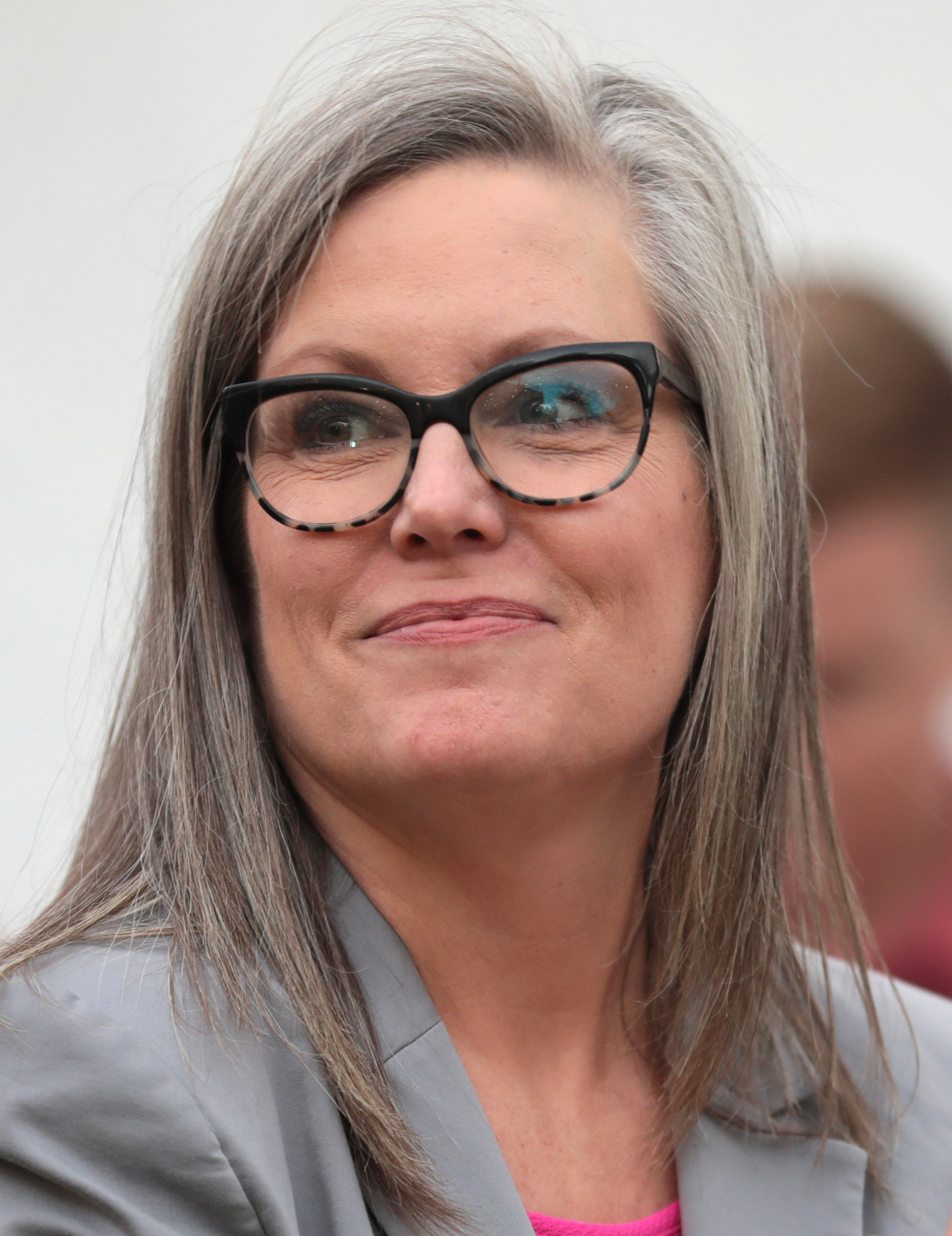

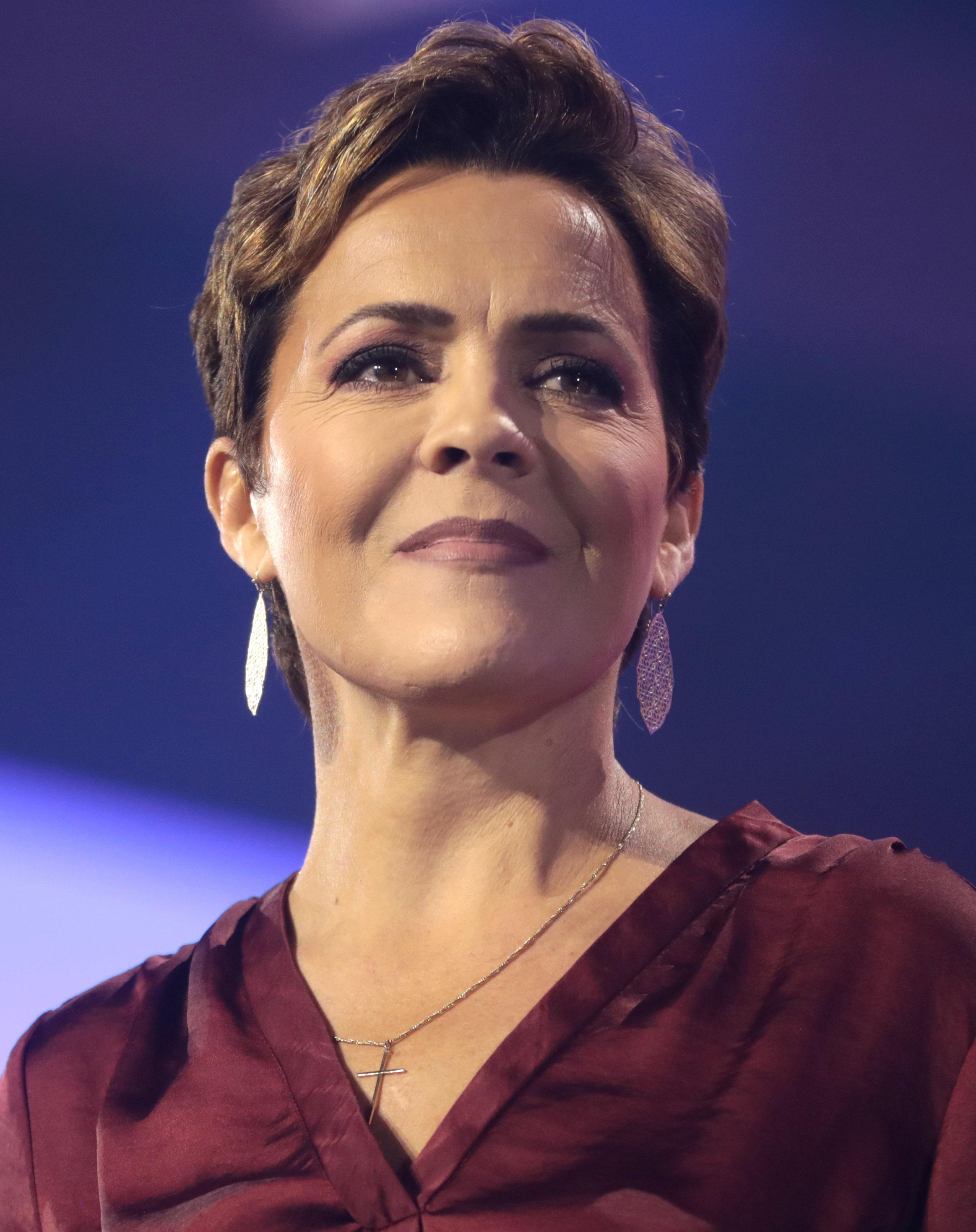
| Nominee | Katie Hobbs | Kari Lake |
| Party | Democratic | Republican |
| Popular vote | 1,287,891 | 1,270,774 |
| Percentage | 50.32% | 49.65% |
- Hobbs: 40–50% 50–60% 60–70% 70–80% 80–90% >90% Lake: 50–60% 60–70% 70–80% 80–90% >90% Tie: 40–50% 50% No data
Governor before election
Doug Ducey
Republican
Elected Governor
Katie Hobbs
Democratic

The 2022 Arizona gubernatorial election was held on November 8, 2022, to elect the governor of Arizona. Democratic secretary of state Katie Hobbs defeated Republican former television journalist Kari Lake. Hobbs succeeded Republican incumbent Doug Ducey who was term-limited and ineligible to seek a third term.

Primaries were held on August 2 for both parties, with Lake winning the Republican nomination and Hobbs winning the Democratic nomination, making this the first gubernatorial election in Arizona history in which both major party candidates for governor were women. With Hobbs elected the fifth female governor of Arizona, Arizona set a record for the most female governors in American history. The concurrent passage of Proposition 131, which establishes the office of lieutenant governor of Arizona, makes this the last gubernatorial election in Arizona to not have one.

Going into the election, most polling had Lake leading and analysts generally considered the race to either be a tossup or leaning Republican. Nonetheless, Hobbs won with 50.32% of the vote, becoming the first Democrat to win a gubernatorial election in Arizona since Janet Napolitano in 2006. Lake refused to concede and filed a post-election lawsuit in an attempt to overturn the results. Most of her lawsuit was rejected by Arizona's state courts, with the remaining part dismissed at trial in May 2023. The race was riddled with voting machine issues, but did not prove to show any evidence of election fraud.

This race was one of six Republican-held governorships up for election in 2022 in a state Joe Biden won in the 2020 presidential election. With a margin of 0.67%, it was the closest gubernatorial election in the state since the 1990–91 election, and the closest of the 2022 cycle. According to Ron Brownstein of CNN in 2023, Hobbs won independent voters by 7 percentage points, which contributed to Lake's defeat.

== Background ==
Arizona was a former longstanding Republican state; however, the state had been trending purple in recent years. In the presidential election two years prior, Democrat Joe Biden became the first Democrat to carry Arizona since 1996. In 2018 and 2020, Democrats also won the two Senate seats in the state. Additionally, Democrats took 5 of the 9 house seats in the state in the House. However, Arizona Republicans maintained control of the legislature after 2020, and won the previous governor race, maintaining a trifecta in the state.

== Republican primary ==
=== Candidates ===
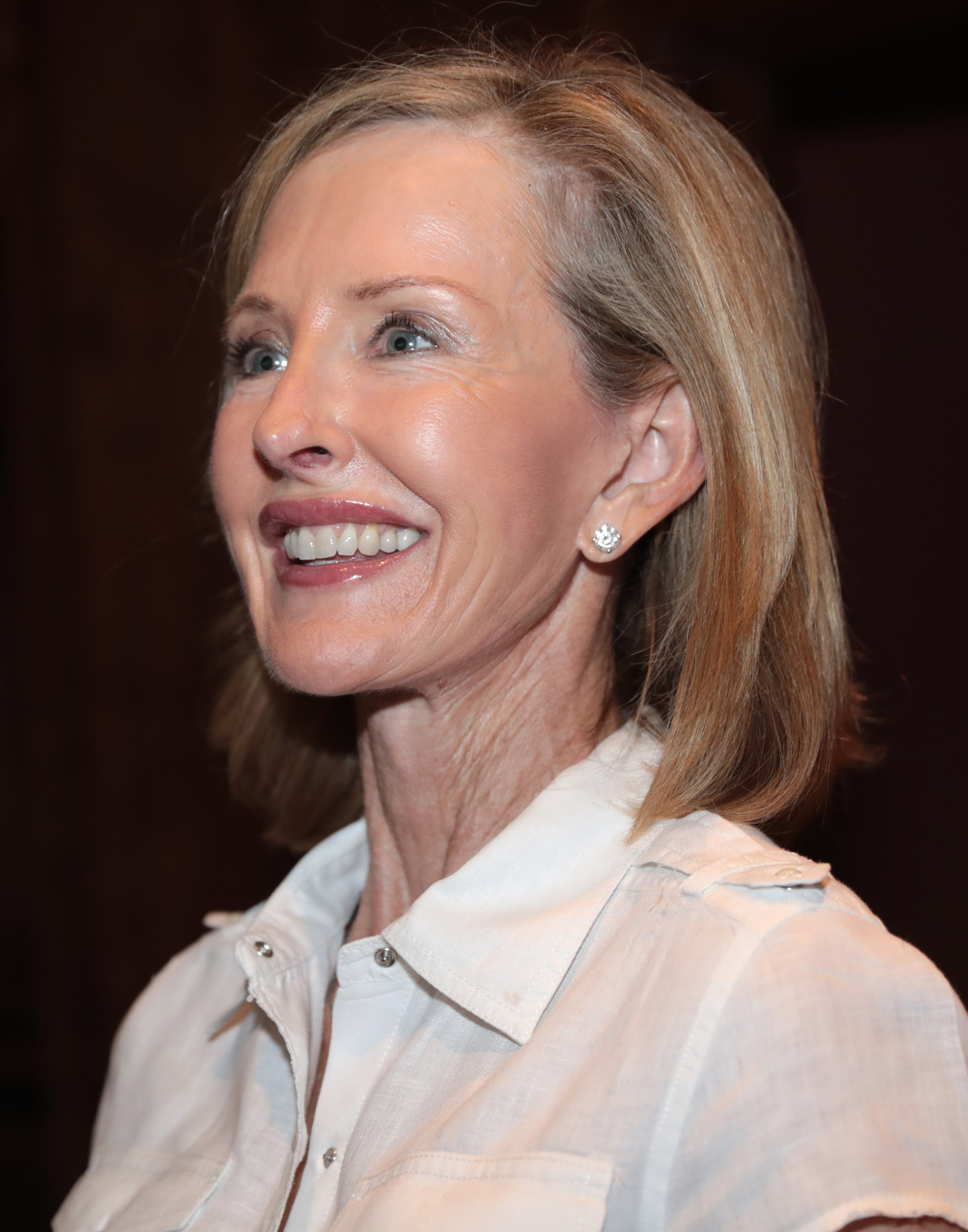
Former Arizona Board of Regents member Karrin Taylor Robson finished second in the primary.

==== Nominee ====
- Kari Lake, former KSAZ-TV news anchor

==== Eliminated in primary ====
- Scott Neely, businessman
- Karrin Taylor Robson, land developer and member of the Arizona Board of Regents
- Paola Tulliani-Zen, businesswoman

==== Withdrew ====
- Steve Gaynor, businessman and nominee for Arizona Secretary of State in 2018
- Matt Salmon, former U.S. representative for Arizona's 1st congressional district and nominee for governor in 2002 (endorsed Robson)
- Kimberly Yee, Arizona State Treasurer (ran for reelection, won)

==== Declined ====
- Kirk Adams, former Chief of Staff to Governor Doug Ducey and former Speaker of the Arizona House of Representatives
- Andy Biggs, U.S. representative for Arizona's 5th congressional district (endorsed Salmon)
- Mark Brnovich, Arizona Attorney General (ran for the U.S. Senate)
- Steve Chucri, Maricopa County supervisor
- David Schweikert, U.S. representative for Arizona's 6th congressional district (endorsed Salmon)
- Kelli Ward, chair of the Arizona Republican Party, former state senator and candidate for the U.S. Senate in 2016 and 2018

=== Endorsements ===
Kari Lake

State legislators

- Wendy Rogers, member of the Arizona Senate from the 6th district (2021–present)

Individuals

- Mike Lindell, founder of My Pillow
- Rob Schneider, comedian and actor
- Peter Thiel, entrepreneur and venture capitalist

Organizations

- American Conservative Union
Karrin Taylor Robson

U.S. Executive Branch officials

- Mike Pence, 48th vice president of the United States (2017–2021)

U.S. representatives

- Newt Gingrich, former Speaker of the United States House of Representatives (1995–1999) and former U.S. representative for Georgia's 6th congressional district (1979–1999)

Governors

- Jan Brewer, former governor of Arizona (2009–2015)
- Doug Ducey, Governor of Arizona (2015–2023)
- Brad Little, Governor of Idaho (2019–present).
- Fife Symington, former governor of Arizona (1990–1997)

State officials

- Lea Marquez Peterson, Chair of the Arizona Corporation Commission (2019–present)

Individuals

- Stephen Moore, conservative writer and economist

=== Polling ===
Aggregate polls

| Source of poll aggregation | Dates administered | Dates updated | Kari Lake | Karrin Taylor Robson | Undecided (Note: Calculated by taking the difference of 100% and all other candidates combined.) | Margin |
|---|---|---|---|---|---|---|
| Real Clear Politics | July 27 – August 1, 2022 | August 2, 2022 | 47.8% | 38.5% | 13.7% | Lake +9.3 |

| Poll source | Date(s) administered | Sample size (Note: Key: A – all adults RV – registered voters LV – likely voters V – unclear) | Margin of error | Steve Gaynor | Kari Lake | Karrin Taylor Robson | Matt Salmon | Kimberly Yee | Other | Undecided |
|---|---|---|---|---|---|---|---|---|---|---|
| The Trafalgar Group (R) | July 30 – August 1, 2022 | 1,064 (LV) | ± 2.9% | – | 49% | 38% | 3% | – | 4% (Note: Neely and Tulliani-Zen with 2%) | 6% |
| Emerson College | July 28–30, 2022 | 600 (LV) | ± 3.9% | – | 46% | 47% | – | – | 3% (Note: Tulliani-Zen with 2%; Neely with 1%) | 4% |
| Rasmussen Reports | July 27–28, 2022 | 710 (LV) | ± 4.0% | – | 43% | 34% | – | – | 12% (Note: "Some other candidate" with 5%; Tulliani-Zen with 4%; Neely with 3%) | 11% |
| OH Predictive Insights | July 27, 2022 | 502 (LV) | ± 4.4% | – | 51% | 33% | 2% | – | 2% (Note: Neely and Tulliani-Zen with 1%) | 12% |
| The Trafalgar Group (R) | July 25–27, 2022 | 1,071 (LV) | ± 2.9% | – | 48% | 39% | 2% | – | 4% (Note: Tulliani-Zen with 3%; Neely with 1%) | 7% |
| Alloy Analytics (R) | July 24–26, 2022 | 600 (LV) | ± 4.0% | – | 45% | 35% | 2% | – | 2% | 15% |
| Public Opinion Strategies (R) (Note: This poll was sponsored by Taylor Robson's campaign) | July 22–24, 2022 | 400 (LV) | ± 4.9% | – | 43% | 43% | – | – | – | 14% |
| Data Orbital (R) | July 18–20, 2022 | 550 (LV) | ± 4.3% | – | 44% | 32% | 5% | – | 4% | 15% |
| Cygnal (R) | July 12–13, 2022 | 419 (LV) | ± 4.8% | – | 45% | 34% | 3% | – | 4% | 14% |
| Data Orbital (R) | July 5–7, 2022 | 550 (LV) | ± 4.3% | – | 39% | 35% | 2% | – | 6% (Note: Neely with 3%; Tulliani-Zen with 2%) | 19% |
| HighGround Public Affairs (R) | July 2–7, 2022 | 400 (LV) | ± 4.9% | – | 39% | 35% | – | – | 4% | 21% |
| OH Predictive Insights | June 30 – July 2, 2022 | 515 (LV) | ± 4.3% | – | 39% | 31% | 6% | – | 3% | 21% |
| OH Predictive Insights | June 30 – July 2, 2022 | 515 (LV) | ± 4.3% | – | 40% | 35% | – | – | 5% | 21% |
| | June 28, 2022 | Salmon withdraws from the race and endorses Robson | | | | | | | | |
| Data Orbital (R) | June 24–26, 2022 | 550 (LV) | ± 4.3% | – | 33% | 24% | 7% | – | 4% | 33% |
| Moore Information Group (R) (Note: This poll was sponsored by Salmon's campaign) | June 22–23, 2022 | 1,000 (LV) | ± 3.1% | – | 37% | 38% | – | – | 11% | 14% |
| The Trafalgar Group (R) | June 14–16, 2022 | 1,068 (LV) | ± 2.9% | – | 39% | 27% | 15% | – | 3% | 17% |
| Data Orbital (R) | June 1–3, 2022 | 550 (LV) | ± 4.3% | – | 27% | 23% | 12% | – | 4% (Note: Neely with 3%; Tulliani-Zen with <1%) | 31% |
| OH Predictive Insights | May 9–16, 2022 | 281 (LV) | ± 5.9% | – | 23% | 21% | 14% | – | 4% | 38% |
| Cygnal (R) (Note: This poll was sponsored by Lake's campaign) | April 28–30, 2022 | – (LV) | – | – | 47% | 22% | 7% | – | 5% (Note: Tulliani-Zen with 5%; Neely with 1%) | 19% |
| | April 28, 2022 | Gaynor withdraws from the race | | | | | | | | |
| The Trafalgar Group (R) | April 25–28, 2022 | 1,064 (LV) | ± 3.0% | 6% | 38% | 27% | 11% | – | 4% | 14% |
| OH Predictive Insights | April 4–5, 2022 | 500 (LV) | ± 4.4% | 3% | 29% | 22% | 11% | – | – | 36% |
| Data Orbital (R) | April 1–3, 2022 | 550 (LV) | ± 4.3% | 7% | 35% | 22% | 12% | – | – | 24% |
| HighGround Public Affairs (R) | March 26–27, 2022 | 264 (LV) | ± 6.0% | 3% | 30% | 10% | 5% | – | 6% | 46% |
| Alloy Analytics (R) | March 9–12, 2022 | 433 (LV) | ± 4.7% | 4% | 37% | 15% | 9% | – | – | 34% |
| Data Orbital (R) | March 2022 | – (LV) | – | 4% | 43% | 13% | 15% | – | – | 26% |
| Data Orbital (R) | February 11–13, 2022 | 300 (LV) | ± 5.7% | 8% | 37% | 9% | 13% | – | – | 34% |
| | January 15, 2022 | Yee withdraws from the race | | | | | | | | |
| OH Predictive Insights | January 11–13, 2022 | 302 (RV) | ± 5.6% | 5% | 21% | 6% | 17% | 5% | 1% (Note: Rivas with 1%) | 46% |
| OH Predictive Insights | November 1–8, 2021 | 252 (RV) | ± 6.2% | 2% | 28% | 1% | 11% | 6% | 1% | 51% |
| OH Predictive Insights | September 7–12, 2021 | 311 (RV) | ± 5.6% | 5% | 25% | 1% | 9% | 6% | 2% (Note: Rivas with 2%) | 53% |
| HighGround Public Affairs (R) | May 3–5, 2021 | 400 (LV) | ± 4.9% | – | 10% | 0% | 8% | 4% | 9% (Note: McCarthy with 5%, "Other" with 4%) | 66% |

Hypothetical polling

Karrin Taylor Robson vs. Matt Salmon

| Poll source | Date(s) administered | Sample size | Margin of error | Karrin Taylor Robson | Matt Salmon | Undecided |
|---|---|---|---|---|---|---|
| WPA Intelligence (R) (Note: This poll was sponsored by Club for Growth Action Fund) | May 12–13, 2021 | 534 (LV) | ± 4.4% | 10% | 42% | 48% |

=== Results ===
Results by county Lake: 40–50%; 50–60%

Results by precinct Lake: 20–30%; 30–40%; 40–50%; 50–60%; 60–70%; 70–80%; 80–90%; 90–100%; Robson: 30–40%; 40–50%; 50–60%; 60–70%; 70–80%; 90–100%; Salmon: 30–40%; 90–100%; Neely: 20–30%; Tie: <50%; No votes

Republican primary results
| Party | Candidate | Votes | % |
|---|---|---|---|
| Republican | Kari Lake | 398,860 | 47.97% |
| Republican | Karrin Taylor Robson | 358,662 | 43.13% |
| Republican | Matt Salmon (withdrawn) | 30,704 | 3.69% |
| Republican | Scott Neely | 25,876 | 3.11% |
| Republican | Paola Tulliani-Zen | 17,281 | 2.08% |
| Write-in | | 105 | 0.01% |
| Total votes | | 831,508 | 100.0% |

== Democratic primary ==
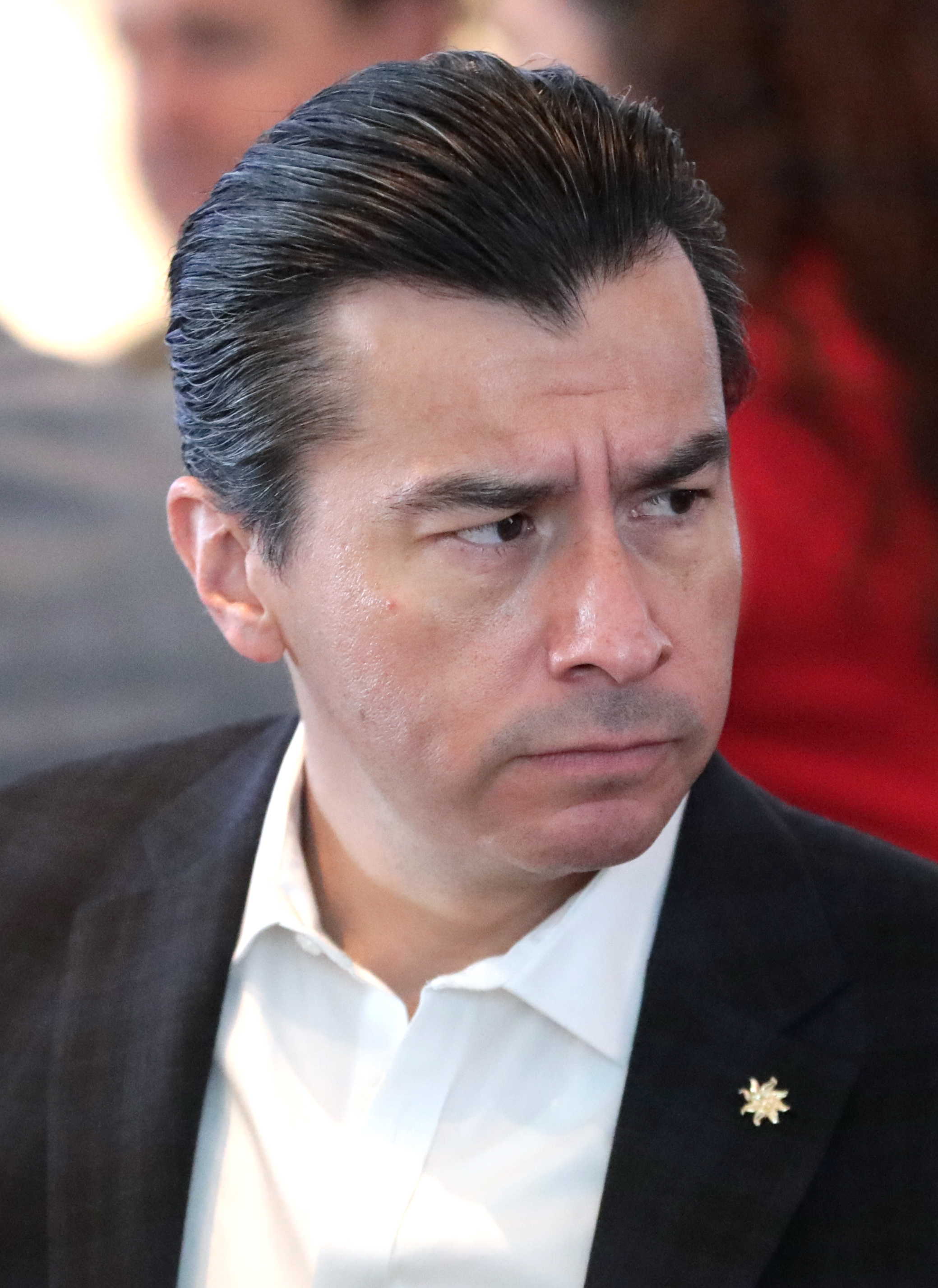
Former CBP chief of staff Marco López Jr. finished second in the primary.

=== Candidates ===
==== Nominee ====
- Katie Hobbs, Arizona Secretary of State

==== Eliminated in primary ====
- Marco López Jr., former Chief of Staff for the U.S. Customs and Border Protection and former mayor of Nogales

==== Withdrawn ====
- Aaron Lieberman, former state representative for the 28th district

==== Declined ====
- Charlene Fernandez, Minority Leader of the Arizona House of Representatives
- Kate Gallego, Mayor of Phoenix
- Ruben Gallego, U.S. representative for Arizona's 7th congressional district (running for re-election)
- Tom O'Halleran, U.S. representative for Arizona's 1st congressional district (running for re-election)
- Greg Stanton, U.S. representative for Arizona's 9th congressional district and former mayor of Phoenix (running for re-election)

=== Endorsements ===
Katie Hobbs

State representatives

- ~~Richard Andrade, state representative for Arizona's 29th legislative district~~
Marco López Jr.

State legislator

- Art Hamilton, state representative for the 22nd district (1973–1999)

Organization

- Latino Victory Fund

=== Polling ===
| Poll source | Date(s) administered | Sample size | Margin of error | Katie Hobbs | Aaron Lieberman | Marco López Jr. | Other | Undecided |
|---|---|---|---|---|---|---|---|---|
| | May 27, 2022 | Lieberman suspends his campaign | | | | | | |
| OH Predictive Insights | May 9–16, 2022 | 261 (LV) | ± 6.1% | 43% | 9% | 8% | – | 40% |
| GQR Research (D) | May 9–15, 2022 | 400 (LV) | ± 4.9% | 49% | 10% | 20% | 2% | 19% |
| HighGround Public Affairs (R) | March 26–27, 2022 | 234 (LV) | ± 6.4% | 27% | 1% | 9% | 3% | 57% |
| OH Predictive Insights | January 11–13, 2022 | 274 (RV) | ± 5.9% | 46% | 5% | 9% | – | 39% |
| OH Predictive Insights | January 11–13, 2022 | 274 (RV) | ± 5.9% | – | 23% | 27% | – | 50% |
| OH Predictive Insights | November 1–8, 2021 | 229 (RV) | ± 6.5% | 42% | 6% | 8% | – | 44% |
| OH Predictive Insights | September 7–12, 2021 | 283 (RV) | ± 5.8% | 40% | 8% | 10% | – | 42% |

=== Results ===
Results by county Hobbs: 40–50%; 50–60%; 60–70%; 70–80%; Lopez: 50–60%

Democratic primary results
| Party | Candidate | Votes | % |
|---|---|---|---|
| Democratic | Katie Hobbs | 431,059 | 72.32% |
| Democratic | Marco A. López Jr. | 136,090 | 22.83% |
| Democratic | Aaron Lieberman (withdrawn) | 28,878 | 4.85% |
| Total votes | | 596,027 | 100.0% |

== Libertarian primary ==
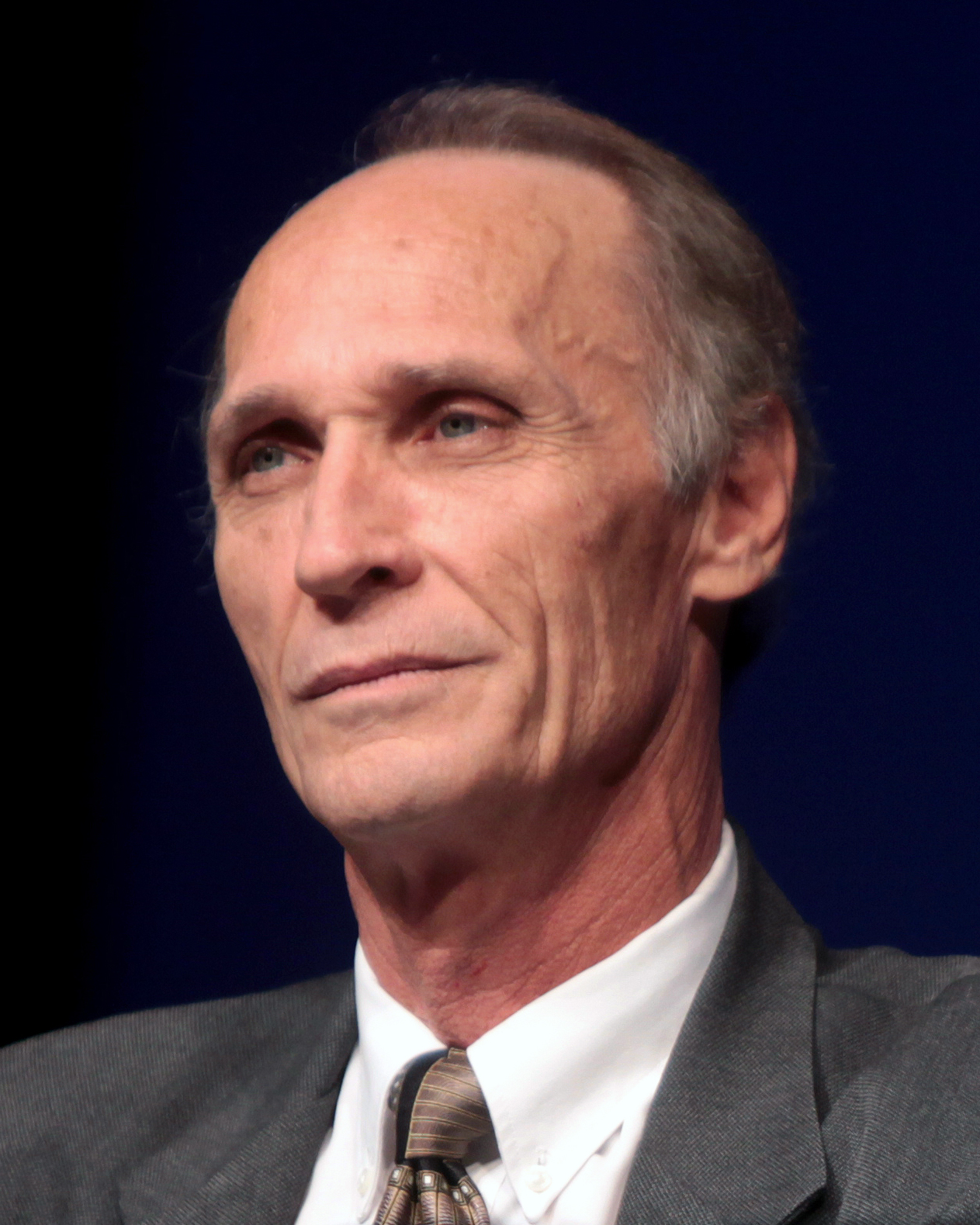
Barry Hess, the sole Libertarian primary candidate

=== Candidates ===
==== Eliminated in primary ====
- Barry Hess, perennial candidate (Note: Nominee for Governor of Arizona in 2002, 2006, 2010, and 2014, and candidate in 2018; nominee for U.S. Senate in 2000, and write-in candidate in 2018 and 2020)

=== Results ===
Write-in candidate Barry Hess was unopposed in the Libertarian primary, but failed to secure the minimum number of votes to receive the nomination.

Libertarian primary results
| Party | Candidate | Votes | % |
|---|---|---|---|
| Libertarian | Barry Hess (write-in) | 550 | 100.0% |
| Total votes | | 550 | 100.0% |

== Certified write-in candidates ==
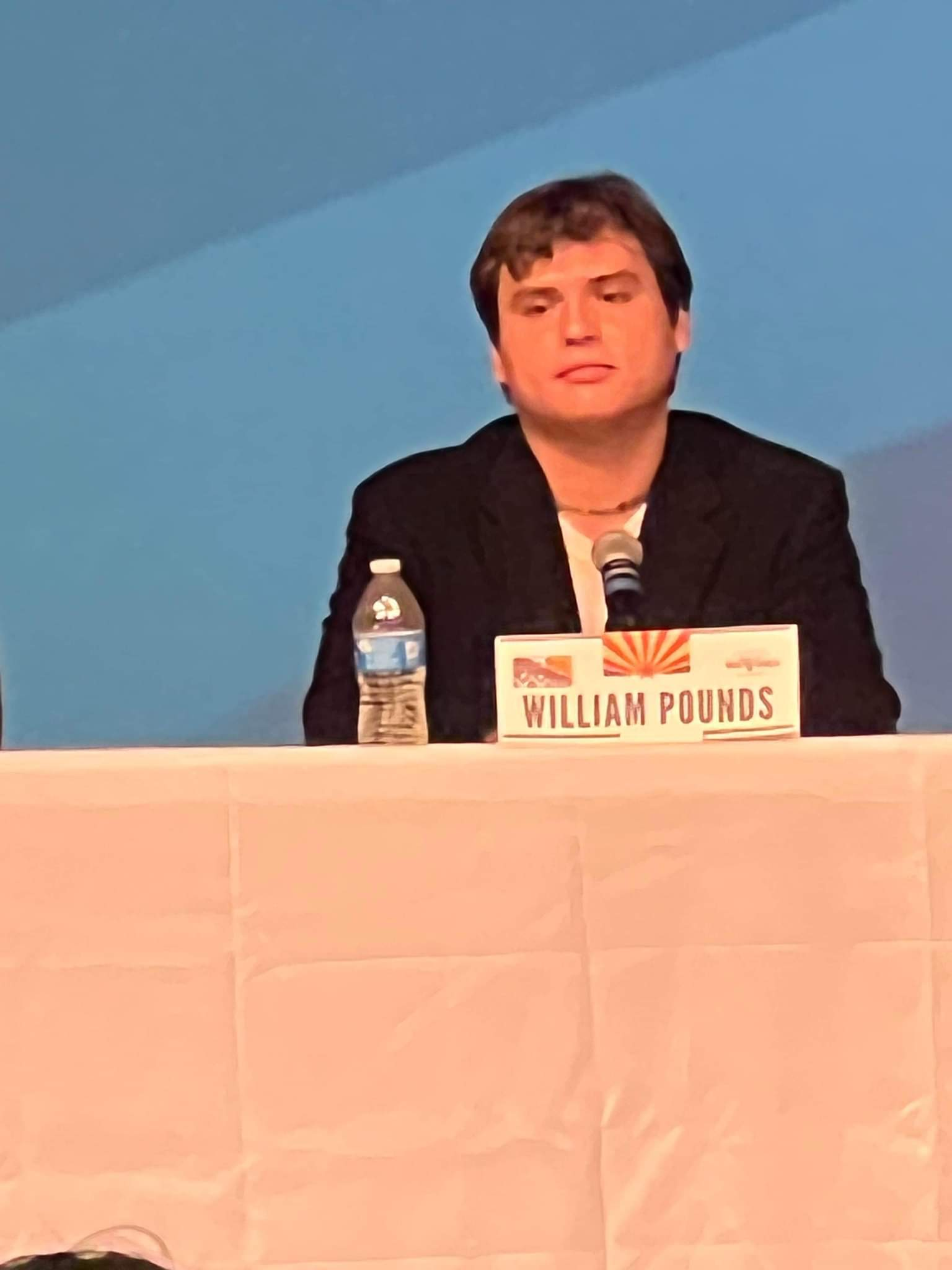
William Pounds, write-in candidate for the Independent Green Party

- Anthony Camboni (independent)
- Steph Denny (Republican)
- Mikki Lutes-Burton (Libertarian)
- Shawn Merrill (independent)
- Alice Novoa (Republican)
- William Pounds IV (Independent-Green)
- Liana West (Green)

== General election ==
Lake was criticized for her denial of Joe Biden's victory in the 2020 presidential election. She had made her closeness to former president Donald Trump central to her campaign. Hobbs refused to debate Lake by arguing that would create a "circus", which became a highly discussed issue of the campaign, resulting in criticism from Republicans. On October 16, 2022, Lake twice refused to say that she would accept the result if she did not win the election: "I'm going to win the election, and I will accept that result."

According to Politico, the race was considered a toss-up. Lake called both the primaries and current round of elections "incompetent" and stated that "honest elections are needed" and that "the system we have right now does not work".

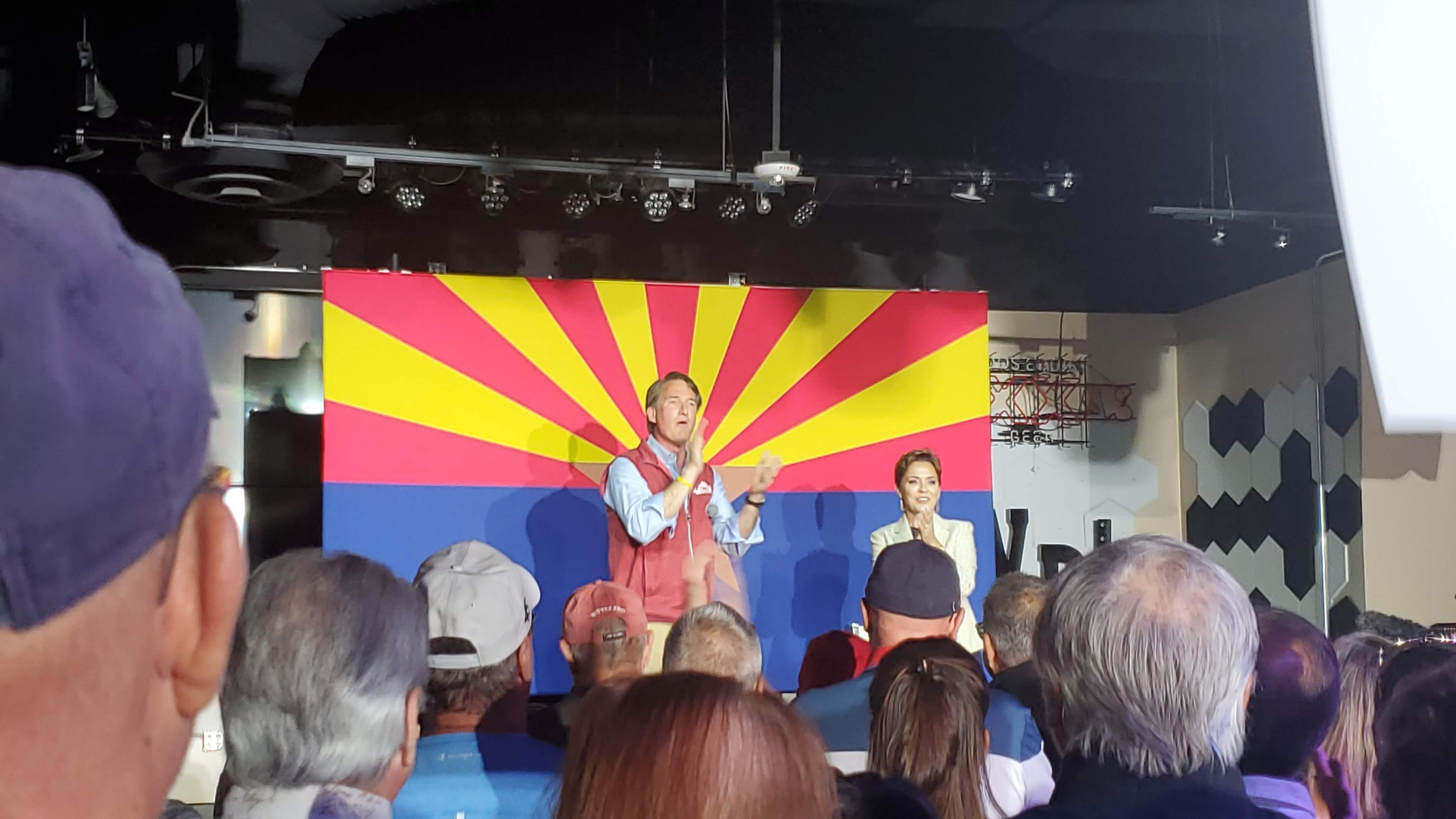
Virginia Republican Governor Glenn Youngkin campaigns for Kari Lake in Tucson

=== Debates and forums ===
Katie Hobbs refused to debate Kari Lake, though one debate-like forum was held.

2022 Arizona gubernatorial forums
| No. | Date | Host | Moderators | Link | Participants | |
| P Participant A Absent N Non-invitee I Invitee W Withdrawn | | | | | | |
| P Participant A Absent N Non-invitee I Invitee W Withdrawn | | | | | Kari Lake | Katie Hobbs |
|---|---|---|---|---|---|---|
| 1 | September 7, 2022 | Arizona Chamber of Commerce and Industry | Danny Seiden | | P | P |
| 2 | October 23, 2022 | Clean Elections | Mike Broomhead | | P | A |

=== Predictions ===
| Source | Ranking | As of |
|---|---|---|
| The Cook Political Report | Tossup | March 4, 2022 |
| Inside Elections | Tossup | March 4, 2022 |
| Sabato's Crystal Ball | Lean R | November 7, 2022 |
| Politico | Tossup | April 1, 2022 |
| RCP | Tossup | January 10, 2022 |
| Fox News | Tossup | October 25, 2022 |
| 538 | Lean R | October 26, 2022 |
| Elections Daily | Lean R | November 7, 2022 |

=== Post-primary endorsements ===
Kari Lake (R)

Executive branch officials

- Donald Trump, former president of the United States (2017–2021)

U.S. representatives

- Tulsi Gabbard, former HI-02 (2013–2021) (Independent)

Statewide officials

- Ron DeSantis, governor of Florida (2019–present)
- Doug Ducey, governor of Arizona (2015–2023)
- Glenn Youngkin, governor of Virginia (2022–2026)

Individuals

- Jerry Colangelo, businessman and sports executive
- Charlie Kirk, founder of Turning Point USA
- Blake Masters, venture capitalist and Republican nominee for the U.S. Senate in 2022
- Karrin Taylor Robson, member of the Arizona Board of Regents (2017-2021) and former 2022 gubernatorial candidate

Organizations

- Association of American Physicians and Surgeons
- National Federation of Independent Business
- NRA Political Victory Fund
Katie Hobbs (D)

Executive branch officials

- Barack Obama, 44th president of the United States (2009–2017)

U.S. senators

- Kyrsten Sinema, Arizona (2019–2025)

U.S. representatives

- Liz Cheney, WY-AL (2017–2023) (Republican)
- Adam Kinzinger, IL-16 (2011–2023) (Republican)

Local officials

- Sam Campana, former mayor of Scottsdale (Republican)
- John Giles, Mayor of Mesa (2014–2025) (Republican)

State legislators

- Lela Alston, former state senator from 24th district (2019–present)
- Richard Andrade, state representative for 29th district (2015–present)
- Sean Bowie, state senator from 18th district (2017–present)
- Lupe Contreras, state senator from 19th district (2015–present)
- Andrea Dalessandro, state representative for 2nd district (2021–present)
- Kirsten Engel, former state senator from 10th district (2021)
- Stephanie Stahl Hamilton, state representative for 10th district (2021–present)
- Pamela Hannley, state representative for 9th district (2017–present)
- Steve May, former state representative for 26th district (1997–2000) (Republican)
- Jamescita Peshlakai, former state senator from 7th district (2017–2021)
- Martín Quezada, state senator from 29th district (2015–2023)
- Victoria Steele, state senator from 9th district (2019–2023)

Individuals

- Camila Cabello, singer
- Kerry Washington, actress

Labor unions

- Communications Workers of America
- National Education Association
- United Mine Workers of America

Organizations

- Chicanos Por La Causa
- Emerge America
- EMILY's List
- End Citizens United
- Equality Arizona
- Feminist Majority PAC
- Human Rights Campaign
- Let America Vote
- MoveOn
- NARAL Pro-Choice America
- National Women's Political Caucus
- Planned Parenthood
- Stonewall Democrats
Declined to endorse

Statewide officials

- Jan Brewer, former governor of Arizona (2009–2015) (Republican)

=== Fundraising ===
Campaign finance reports as of December 31, 2022
| Candidate | Raised | Spent | Cash on hand |
|---|---|---|---|
| Katie Hobbs (D) | $14,796,583 | $14,703,952 | $527,969 |
| Kari Lake (R) | $15,855,394 | $15,381,454 | $1,592,293 |
Source: SeeTheMoney

=== Polling ===
Aggregate polls

| Source of poll aggregation | Dates administered | Dates updated | Kari Lake (R) | Katie Hobbs (D) | Undecided (Note: Calculated by taking the difference of 100% and all other candidates combined.) | Margin |
|---|---|---|---|---|---|---|
| RealClearPolitics | November 1–7, 2022 | November 8, 2022 | 50.8% | 47.3% | 1.9% | Lake +3.5 |
| FiveThirtyEight | October 17 – November 8, 2022 | November 8, 2022 | 49.5% | 47.1% | 3.4% | Lake +2.4 |
| 270ToWin | November 3–7, 2022 | November 8, 2022 | 48.9% | 46.9% | 4.2% | Lake +2.0 |
| Average | | | 49.7% | 47.1% | 3.2% | Lake +2.6 |

| Poll source | Date(s) administered | Sample size | Margin of error | Kari Lake (R) | Katie Hobbs (D) | Other | Undecided |
|---|---|---|---|---|---|---|---|
| The Trafalgar Group (R) | November 5–7, 2022 | 1,094 (LV) | ± 2.9% | 51% | 47% | – | 3% |
| Data Orbital (R) | November 4–6, 2022 | 550 (LV) | ± 4.3% | 50% | 47% | 2% (Note: "Refused" with 2%) | 2% |
| Research Co. | November 4–6, 2022 | 450 (LV) | ± 4.6% | 49% | 47% | – | 4% |
| Data for Progress (D) | November 2–6, 2022 | 1,359 (LV) | ± 3.0% | 52% | 48% | – | – |
| Targoz Market Research | November 2–6, 2022 | 560 (LV) | ± 4.1% | 50% | 48% | 2% (Note: Hess (L, disqualified) with 2%) | – |
| KAConsulting (R) (Note: Poll conducted for Citizens United, a conservative non-profit organization.) | November 2–3, 2022 | 501 (LV) | ± 4.4% | 49% | 45% | 1% | 6% |
| InsiderAdvantage (R) | November 2, 2022 | 550 (LV) | ± 4.2% | 51% | 48% | – | 1% |
| HighGround Inc. | November 1–2, 2022 | 500 (LV) | ± 4.4% | 47% | 45% | 2% (Note: "Some other candidate" with 2%) | 6% |
| Remington Research Group (R) | November 1–2, 2022 | 1,075 (LV) | ± 2.9% | 49% | 46% | – | 5% |
| Big Data Poll (R) | October 31 – November 2, 2022 | 1,051 (LV) | ± 3.0% | 51% | 47% | – | 2% |
| Marist College | October 31 – November 2, 2022 | 1,157 (RV) | ± 4.1% | 47% | 48% | 1% (Note: "Another party's candidate" with 1%) | 4% |
| Marist College | October 31 – November 2, 2022 | 1,015 (LV) | ± 4.3% | 48% | 49% | 1% (Note: "Another party's candidate" with 1%) | 2% |
| Civiqs | October 29 – November 2, 2022 | 852 (LV) | ± 4.2% | 50% | 48% | 1% (Note: "Someone else" with 1%) | – |
| Alloy Analytics (R) | October 30 – November 1, 2022 | 639 (LV) | ± 3.9% | 50% | 46% | – | 4% |
| Emerson College | October 30 – November 1, 2022 | 1,000 (LV) | ± 3.0% | 49% | 47% | 2% (Note: "Someone else" with 2%) | 2% |
| Emerson College | October 30 – November 1, 2022 | 1,000 (LV) | ± 3.0% | 50% | 47% | 3% (Note: "Someone else" with 2%) | – |
| The Phillips Academy | October 29–30, 2022 | 985 (LV) | ± 3.1% | 53% | 42% | – | 4% |
| Fox News | October 26–30, 2022 | 1,003 (RV) | ± 3.0% | 47% | 46% | 3% (Note: "Other" with 2%; "Wouldn't vote" with 1%) | 4% |
| Wick Insights (R) | October 26–30, 2022 | 1,122 (LV) | ± 3.2% | 49% | 47% | 2% (Note: "Someone else" with 2%) | 2% |
| Fabrizio, Lee and Associates (R) | October 24–26, 2022 | 800 (LV) | ± 3.5% | 50% | 47% | – | – |
| OH Predictive Insights | October 24–26, 2022 | 600 (LV) | ± 4.0% | 49% | 47% | – | 4% |
| Siena College/NYT | October 24–26, 2022 | 604 (LV) | ± 4.4% | 48% | 48% | – | 4% |
| BSP Research/Shaw & Co. (Note: Poll conducted for Univision.) | October 19–26, 2022 | 1,000 (RV) | ± 3.1% | 42% | 40% | 3% (Note: "Someone else" with 3%) | 14% |
| InsiderAdvantage (R) | October 24–25, 2022 | 550 (LV) | ± 4.2% | 54% | 43% | – | 2% |
| co/efficient (R) | October 20–21, 2022 | 1,111 (LV) | ± 3.1% | 49% | 45% | – | 6% |
| Data Orbital (R) | October 17–19, 2022 | 550 (LV) | ± 4.3% | 47% | 44% | 3% (Note: "Refused" with 3%) | 6% |
| Susquehanna Polling & Research (R) (Note: Poll conducted for The Federalist, a conservative online magazine.) | October 14–18, 2022 | 600 (LV) | ± 4.0% | 47% | 48% | 2% (Note: Lutes-Burton (L/WI) with 1%; "Other" with 1%; "Refuse" with <1%) | 3% |
| The Trafalgar Group (R) (Note: This poll was sponsored by The Daily Wire) | October 16–17, 2022 | 1,078 (LV) | ± 2.9% | 49% | 46% | – | 4% |
| Data for Progress (D) | October 11–17, 2022 | 893 (LV) | ± 3.0% | 50% | 46% | – | 4% |
| Wick Insights (R) | October 8–14, 2022 | 1,058 (LV) | ± 3.1% | 47% | 47% | 2% (Note: "Someone else" with 2%) | 3% |
| HighGround Inc. (Note: This poll was sponsored by Arizona's Family) | October 12–13, 2022 | 500 (LV) | ± 4.3% | 45% | 46% | 2% (Note: "Some other candidate" with 2%) | 7% |
| InsiderAdvantage (R) | October 11, 2022 | 550 (LV) | ± 4.2% | 49% | 46% | – | 4% |
| Ascend Action (R) | October 8–10, 2022 | 954 (LV) | ± 3.2% | 46% | 45% | 5% (Note: "Another candidate" with 5%) | 5% |
| Big Data Poll (R) | October 2–5, 2022 | 974 (LV) | ± 3.1% | 49% | 46% | 1% (Note: "Other/Write-in" with 1%) | 6% |
| YouGov/CBS News | September 30 – October 4, 2022 | 1,164 (RV) | ± 3.8% | 49% | 49% | – | 1% |
| CNN/SSRS | September 26 – October 2, 2022 | 900 (RV) | ± 4.4% | 44% | 49% | 7% (Note: "Neither" with 5%; "Other" with 2%) | – |
| CNN/SSRS | September 26 – October 2, 2022 | 795 (LV) | ± 4.6% | 46% | 49% | 5% (Note: "Neither" with 3%; "Other" with 2%) | – |
| Fox News | September 22–26, 2022 | 1,008 (RV) | ± 3.0% | 43% | 44% | 6% (Note: "Other" with 2%; "Wouldn't vote" with 4%) | 7% |
| Suffolk University | September 21–25, 2022 | 500 (LV) | ± 4.4% | 45% | 46% | – | 8% |
| Marist College | September 19–22, 2022 | 1,260 (RV) | ± 3.6% | 46% | 45% | <1% | 8% |
| Marist College | September 19–22, 2022 | 1,076 (LV) | ± 3.9% | 49% | 46% | – | 5% |
| Data for Progress (D) | September 15–19, 2022 | 768 (LV) | ± 4.0% | 51% | 47% | – | 3% |
| The Trafalgar Group (R) | September 14–17, 2022 | 1,080 (LV) | ± 2.9% | 50% | 46% | – | 4% |
| Fabrizio Ward (R)/Impact Research (D) | September 8–15, 2022 | 500 (LV) | ± 4.4% | 48% | 49% | – | 3% |
| Survey Monkey (D) (Note: This poll was sponsored by Center Street PAC, which opposes Lake) | September 6–9, 2022 | 972 (RV) | ± 3.0% | 37% | 49% | – | 14% |
| Survey Monkey (D) | September 6–9, 2022 | 563 (LV) | ± 3.0% | 39% | 53% | – | 8% |
| Emerson College | September 6–7, 2022 | 627 (LV) | ± 3.9% | 46% | 46% | 2% (Note: "Someone else" with 2%) | 6% |
| InsiderAdvantage (R) | September 6–7, 2022 | 550 (LV) | ± 4.2% | 43% | 44% | – | 13% |
| Echelon Insights | August 31 – September 7, 2022 | 773 (RV) | ± 4.5% | 40% | 50% | – | 10% |
| The Trafalgar Group (R) | August 24–27, 2022 | 1,074 (LV) | ± 2.9% | 47% | 46% | 3% (Note: Hess with 3%) | 5% |
| RMG Research | August 16–22, 2022 | 750 (LV) | ± 3.6% | 46% | 44% | – | 9% |
| Fox News | August 12–16, 2022 | 1,012 (RV) | ± 3.0% | 44% | 47% | 2% | 6% |
| American Viewpoint (R) (Note: This poll was sponsored by an undisclosed client retaining Summit Consulting Group) | August 2022 | – (LV) | – | 46% | 47% | 3% | 4% |
| Beacon Research (D) (Note: This poll was sponsored by the Environmental Voter Project) | July 5–20, 2022 | 802 (RV) | ± 3.5% | 38% | 43% | 2% | 12% |
| Beacon Research (D) | July 5–20, 2022 | 504 (LV) | ± 4.4% | 40% | 49% | 3% | 7% |
| TargetSmart (D) (Note: This poll was sponsored by the Arizona Research Consortium) | June 28–30, 2022 | 704 (LV) | ± 3.7% | 38% | 47% | 7% | 8% |
| GQR Research (D) (Note: This poll was sponsored by Hobbs's campaign) | May 9–15, 2022 | 400 (LV) | ± 4.9% | 45% | 50% | – | 4% |
| Data Orbital (R) | February 11–13, 2022 | 1,000 (LV) | ± 3.1% | 43% | 41% | – | 16% |
| Redfield & Wilton Strategies | November 10, 2021 | 624 (RV) | ± 3.9% | 34% | 39% | 2% | 19% |
| Redfield & Wilton Strategies | November 10, 2021 | 592 (LV) | ± 4.0% | 37% | 41% | 2% | 18% |

Hypothetical polling

Karrin Taylor Robson vs. Katie Hobbs

| Poll source | Date(s) administered | Sample size | Margin of error | Karrin Taylor Robson (R) | Katie Hobbs (D) | Other | Undecided |
|---|---|---|---|---|---|---|---|
| Beacon Research (D) | July 5–20, 2022 | 802 (RV) | ± 3.5% | 37% | 42% | 4% | 13% |
| Beacon Research (D) | July 5–20, 2022 | 504 (LV) | ± 4.4% | 40% | 48% | 5% | 7% |
| TargetSmart (D) | June 28–30, 2022 | 704 (LV) | ± 3.7% | 39% | 44% | 10% | 7% |
| GQR Research (D) | May 9–15, 2022 | 400 (LV) | ± 4.9% | 46% | 47% | – | 4% |
| Data Orbital (R) | February 11–13, 2022 | 1,000 (LV) | ± 3.1% | 37% | 42% | – | 21% |

Matt Salmon vs. Katie Hobbs

| Poll source | Date(s) administered | Sample size | Margin of error | Matt Salmon (R) | Katie Hobbs (D) | Other | Undecided |
|---|---|---|---|---|---|---|---|
| Data Orbital (R) | February 11–13, 2022 | 1,000 (LV) | ± 3.1% | 39% | 41% | – | 20% |
| Redfield & Wilton Strategies | November 10, 2021 | 624 (RV) | ± 3.9% | 31% | 40% | 4% | 17% |
| Redfield & Wilton Strategies | November 10, 2021 | 592 (LV) | ± 4.0% | 35% | 43% | 4% | 16% |

Steve Gaynor vs. Katie Hobbs

| Poll source | Date(s) administered | Sample size | Margin of error | Steve Gaynor (R) | Katie Hobbs (D) | Undecided |
|---|---|---|---|---|---|---|
| Data Orbital (R) | February 11–13, 2022 | 1,000 (LV) | ± 3.1% | 39% | 41% | 20% |

Generic Republican vs. generic Democrat

| Poll source | Date(s) administered | Sample size | Margin of error | Generic Republican | Generic Democrat | Undecided |
|---|---|---|---|---|---|---|
| OH Predictive Insights | March 7–15, 2022 | 753 (RV) | ± 3.6% | 39% | 37% | 25% |
| OH Predictive Insights | January 11–13, 2022 | 855 (RV) | ± 3.4% | 39% | 35% | 26% |
| OH Predictive Insights | November 1–8, 2021 | 713 (RV) | ± 3.7% | 39% | 37% | 24% |
| OH Predictive Insights | September 7–12, 2021 | 882 (RV) | ± 3.3% | 39% | 36% | 25% |
| Data for Progress (D) (Note: Poll sponsored by the Defend Students Action Fund) | September 15–22, 2020 | 481 (LV) | ± 4.4% | 42% | 39% | 19% |

=== Results ===
State legislative districts results

Hobbs defeated Lake by a margin of 0.67%, narrowly outperforming Joe Biden's 0.3% margin of victory in 2020 in Arizona. Hobbs won by 37,638 votes in Maricopa County, home to a majority of Arizona's population, which was larger than her statewide margin of 17,117 votes.

2022 Arizona gubernatorial election
| Party | Candidate | Votes | % | ±% |
|---|---|---|---|---|
| Democratic | Katie Hobbs | 1,287,891 | 50.32% | +8.48% |
| Republican | Kari Lake | 1,270,774 | 49.65% | −6.35% |
| Write-in | | 820 | 0.03% | +0.01% |
| Total votes | | 2,559,485 | 100.0% | |
| Turnout | | 2,592,313 | 62.56% | |
| Registered electors | | 4,143,929 | | |
| Democratic gain from Republican | | | | |

==== By county ====
By county

| County | Katie Hobbs Democratic | | Kari Lake Republican | | Write-in | | Margin | | Total votes |
| County | # | % | # | % | # | % | # | % | Total votes |
|---|---|---|---|---|---|---|---|---|---|
| Apache | 17,739 | 66.65 | 8,870 | 33.33 | 5 | 0.02 | 8,869 | 33.32 | 26,614 |
| Cochise | 19,137 | 41.01 | 27,481 | 58.89 | 48 | 0.10 | -8,344 | -17.88 | 46,666 |
| Coconino | 34,389 | 62.84 | 20,298 | 37.09 | 40 | 0.07 | 14,091 | 25.75 | 54,727 |
| Gila | 7,674 | 34.18 | 14,763 | 65.76 | 13 | 0.06 | -7,089 | -31.58 | 22,450 |
| Graham | 3,087 | 28.46 | 7,760 | 71.54 | 0 | 0.00 | -4,673 | -43.08 | 10,847 |
| Greenlee | 920 | 37.61 | 1,526 | 62.39 | 0 | 0.00 | -606 | -24.78 | 2,446 |
| La Paz | 1,646 | 29.93 | 3,847 | 69.96 | 6 | 0.11 | -2,201 | -40.03 | 5,499 |
| Maricopa | 790,352 | 51.20 | 752,714 | 48.77 | 469 | 0.03 | 37,638 | 2.44 | 1,543,535 |
| Mohave | 20,369 | 24.99 | 61,125 | 74.99 | 16 | 0.02 | -40,756 | -50.00 | 81,510 |
| Navajo | 18,058 | 44.69 | 22,340 | 55.28 | 13 | 0.03 | -4,282 | -10.60 | 40,411 |
| Pima | 241,398 | 60.57 | 157,034 | 39.40 | 121 | 0.03 | 84,364 | 21.17 | 398,553 |
| Pinal | 60,019 | 41.73 | 83,773 | 58.25 | 34 | 0.02 | -23,754 | -16.52 | 143,826 |
| Santa Cruz | 8,724 | 66.60 | 4,371 | 33.37 | 4 | 0.03 | 4,353 | 33.23 | 13,099 |
| Yavapai | 44,316 | 35.97 | 78,832 | 63.99 | 43 | 0.03 | -34,516 | -28.02 | 123,191 |
| Yuma | 20,063 | 43.51 | 26,040 | 56.47 | 8 | 0.02 | -5,977 | -12.96 | 46,111 |
| Totals | 1,287,891 | 50.32 | 1,270,774 | 49.65 | 820 | 0.03 | 17,117 | 0.67 | 2,559,485 |

Counties that flipped from Republican to Democratic

- Maricopa (largest municipality: Phoenix)

==== By congressional district ====
Hobbs won five of nine congressional districts, including two that elected Republicans.

| District | Hobbs | Lake | Representative elected |
|---|---|---|---|
| 1st | 52% | 48% | David Schweikert |
| 2nd | 45% | 54% | Eli Crane |
| 3rd | 75% | 24% | Ruben Gallego |
| 4th | 56% | 44% | Greg Stanton |
| 5th | 43% | 57% | Andy Biggs |
| 6th | 52% | 48% | Juan Ciscomani |
| 7th | 66% | 33% | Raúl Grijalva |
| 8th | 44% | 55% | Debbie Lesko |
| 9th | 36% | 63% | Paul Gosar |

=== Exit polling ===
2022 Arizona gubernatorial election voter demographics (CNN)
| Demographic subgroup | Hobbs | Lake | % of total vote |
Ideology
| Liberals | 97 | 2 | 22 |
| Moderates | 59 | 39 | 42 |
| Conservatives | 8 | 91 | 36 |
Party
| Democrats | 95 | 4 | 27 |
| Republicans | 9 | 91 | 33 |
| Independents | 52 | 45 | 40 |
Gender
| Men | 45 | 54 | 47 |
| Women | 54 | 45 | 53 |
Marital status
| Married | 42 | 56 | 59 |
| Unmarried | 59 | 40 | 41 |
Gender by marital status
| Married men | 39 | 59 | 28 |
| Married women | 44 | 54 | 31 |
| Unmarried men | 52 | 47 | 19 |
| Unmarried women | 65 | 34 | 22 |
Race/ethnicity
| White | 49 | 50 | 70 |
| Other | N/A | N/A | 12 |
| Latino | 51 | 47 | 17 |
White voters by gender
| White men | 44 | 54 | 34 |
| White women | 53 | 46 | 36 |
Age
| 18–29 years old | 71 | 29 | 12 |
| 30–44 years old | 53 | 45 | 20 |
| 45–64 years old | 43 | 55 | 34 |
| 65 and older | 46 | 52 | 34 |
Area type
| Urban | 52 | 46 | 46 |
| Suburban | 48 | 51 | 47 |
| Rural | N/A | N/A | 7 |
Education
| College graduate | 57 | 42 | 40 |
| No college degree | 44 | 54 | 60 |
Education by race
| White college graduates | 58 | 41 | 32 |
| Non-white college graduates | 55 | 44 | 8 |
| Whites without college | 41 | 57 | 38 |
| Non-whites without college | 51 | 47 | 22 |
Education by gender and race
| White women with college degrees | 64 | 36 | 15 |
| White women without college degrees | 45 | 54 | 20 |
| White men with college degrees | 53 | 47 | 16 |
| White men without college degrees | 36 | 62 | 18 |
| Voters of color | 52 | 46 | 30 |
Educational attainment
| Advanced degree | 60 | 39 | 17 |
| Bachelor's degree | 55 | 44 | 23 |
| Associate's degree | 41 | 57 | 18 |
| Some college | 47 | 51 | 32 |
| Never attended college | N/A | N/A | 10 |

== Dispute over results ==
On November 17, Lake refused to concede defeat, and announced she was assembling a legal team to challenge the results. Lake alleged voter disfranchisement due to ballot printing problems and long waiting lines in Maricopa County, which had elections run by local Republican officials Bill Gates and Stephen Richer. In 70 out of 223 Maricopa County polling sites, voting machine ballots were printed too lightly to be read by tabulators; the problem was caused by a printer setting which had not shown widespread issues during prior testing. If voters did not want to wait in line for the issue to be fixed, they could leave to vote at another Maricopa County polling site, with wait times for polling sites being shown online, and many polling sites had little to no waiting lines, stated Maricopa County election officials. Alternatively, voters could drop their ballots into a secure box ("Box 3"), with these ballots being later tabulated at Maricopa County's elections headquarters, under monitoring from observers from both parties; ultimately, around 17,000 Maricopa County ballots were dropped into Box 3.

Bill Gates, the Republican chair of Maricopa's Board of Supervisors, partially blamed the long lines on Arizona Republican Party chairwoman Kelli Ward for discouraging voters from using Box 3; she had claimed that Box 3 should not be used as "Maricopa County is not turning on their tabulators downtown today". Lake herself told her supporters to stay in line to vote, while a lawyer for Lake's campaign assuaged concerns about using Box 3 to vote. Lake's campaign filed a lawsuit on Election Day to extend voting for another three hours, but Maricopa County Superior Court Judge Tim Ryan declined to do so, stating: "The court doesn't have any evidence that any voter was precluded from their right to vote".

While Lake alleged that Republican-dominated areas in Maricopa County were disproportionately affected by the printing problems, The Washington Post found that the percentage of registered Republicans in affected precincts (37%) was very close to the percentage of registered Republicans across Maricopa County (35%), and also found that some Democrat-dominated areas also faced the printing problems. According to the Associated Press: "Democrats voted overwhelmingly via ballots received in the mail. In-person Election Day votes heavily favored the GOP because Lake and other prominent Republicans had claimed it was more secure, which election experts dispute." Meanwhile, The New York Times analyzed 45 of the claims of irregularities reported by voters, finding that in 34 of these 45 claims, the voters were able to cast their vote despite an inconvenience; while for the others, three raised problems with voter registration; seven gave unclear accounts as to what exactly happened; and only one said she had been denied the opportunity to vote, though she acknowledged she had arrived at her polling place at the time it closed.

Arizona's Assistant Attorney General Jennifer Wright demanded that Maricopa County explain the election problems, stating: "These complaints go beyond pure speculation, but include first-hand witness accounts that raise concerns regarding Maricopa's lawful compliance with Arizona election law".

=== Delays in certification of voting results ===
14 of Arizona's 15 counties certified the voting results by the November 28, 2022 deadline; the exception was Cochise County. Despite no evidence of irregularities with vote counting, Cochise County's Republican officials delayed their certification vote to December 2, 2022, to accommodate a hearing on the certification of voting machines. On November 21, Arizona's State Elections Director, Kori Lorick, had sent county officials' confirmation that the county's voting machines had been certified by the United States Election Assistance Commission in an accredited laboratory. However, the county's officials insisted on hearing more from those who had alleged that the voting machines were not properly certified.

On November 29, Hobbs, as secretary of state, sued the county for being unable to certify results by the deadline.

On December 1, the Pima County Superior Court ruled that the Cochise County Board of Supervisors must hold an emergency meeting on the same day to certify and approve the canvass. Hours later, the Board voted 2–0 to do so.

=== Lawsuit ===
On December 9, 2022, after Arizona certified the election, Lake initiated a lawsuit seeking a court order to either overturn Hobbs' victory and declare Lake as the winner of the election, or redo the election in Maricopa County. Lake's complaint alleged that there were hundreds of thousands of illegal votes in the election, but no evidence was provided. On December 19, Maricopa County Superior Court Judge Peter Thompson dismissed eight of ten counts of Lake's lawsuit, regarding invalid signatures on mail-in ballots, incorrect certification, inadequate remedy, as well as violations of freedom of speech, equal protection, due process, the secrecy clause, and constitutional rights. The judge allowed the remaining two counts to go to trial, these being allegations that election officials intentionally interfered with Maricopa County ballot printers and with the chain of custody of Maricopa County ballots. The judge ruled that Lake needed to prove during the trial that the above allegations were true, and that the alleged actions "did in fact result in a changed outcome" of the election.

Lake's reaction to the judge's initial ruling was declaring: "Arizona, We will have our day in court!" During the two-day trial, Northrop Grumman information security officer Clay Parikh, a witness called by Lake, testified that some ballots had printing errors that would cause tabulation issues, but also testified that these misprinted ballots would ultimately be counted after duplicates were made. On December 24, judge Thompson dismissed Lake's remaining case, as the court did not find clear and convincing evidence that misconduct was committed. The judge wrote: "Every single witness before the Court disclaimed any personal knowledge of such [intentional] misconduct. The Court cannot accept speculation or conjecture in place of clear and convincing evidence". The judge further ruled that "printer failures did not actually affect the results of the election", while highlighting that one witness called by Lake testified that "printer failures were largely the result of unforeseen mechanical failure." Regarding the witness Richard Baris, a pollster, who alleged that potential voters were disenfranchised, the judge noted Baris' testimony that "nobody can give a specific number" of people who were disenfranchised, and called Baris' analysis "decidedly insufficient" in this case, because Baris' analysis showed that Hobbs "had a good chance of winning anyway" even after reversing the supposed disenfranchisement.

On December 30, 2022, Lake appealed the ruling to the First Division of the Arizona Court of Appeals. Lake also attempted to transfer her appeal directly to the Arizona Supreme Court, which denied this on January 4, 2023, ruling that there was "no good cause" to do so. On February 16, a three-judge panel for the Arizona Court of Appeals affirmed Thompson's ruling; chief judge Kent Cattani wrote the opinion and two other judges, Maria Elena Cruz and Peter Swann, concurred. The appeals court found that "Lake’s only purported evidence" that long lines at voting centers "had any potential effect on election results was, quite simply, sheer speculation." The appeals court noted that "Lake presented no evidence that voters whose ballots were unreadable by on-site tabulators were not able to vote", while highlighting that Lake's own cybersecurity expert testified to the contrary. While Lake alleged that there was improper chain-of-custody documentation in Maricopa County, the appeals court decided that the lower court reasonably concluded that Lake failed to prove this allegation. While Lake alleged that Maricopa County had improperly handled early ballots from election day, the appeals court ruled that even if this allegation was true, Lake "failed to present evidence, as opposed to speculation", that this affected the result of the election. In summary, the appeals court wrote that the evidence presented in court showed that "voters were able to cast their ballots, that votes were counted correctly and that no other basis justifies setting aside the election results".

Lake filed an appeal to the Arizona Supreme Court on March 1, 2023. The Arizona Supreme Court issued a ruling on March 22, written by Arizona Supreme Court Chief Justice Robert Brutinel, finding that the Appeals Court correctly dismissed six of Lake's seven legal claims, as these challenges of hers were "insufficient to warrant the requested relief under Arizona or federal law." For Lake's remaining legal claim, on signature verification, the Arizona Supreme Court ruled that the lower courts incorrectly interpreted her challenge as pertaining to signature verification policies themselves, instead of the application of such policies; thus this issue was sent back for Maricopa County Superior Court Judge Peter Thompson to reconsider.

The Arizona Supreme Court in May 2023 employed "the extraordinary remedy of a sanction" against Lake's lawyer, which was a $2,000 fine, for having "made false factual statements to the Court". Within Lake's court filings was the claim that it was an "undisputed fact that 35,563 unaccounted for ballots were added to the total of ballots [at] a third party processing facility". The Arizona Supreme Court responded that there is "no evidence that 35,563 ballots were" added, and further that Lake's claim had been disputed by Lake's legal opponents, so the claim of an "undisputed fact" is "unequivocally false".

Later, in May 2023, Lake was granted a second trial by Judge Thompson, where Lake needed to prove that "Maricopa County’s higher level signature reviewers conducted no signature verification or curing", in violation of law, and that this changed the election result. Thompson later acknowledged that the scope of Lake's claim of misconduct also extended to Maricopa County's lower level signature reviewers. The result of the trial was that Lake's remaining claim on improper signature verification was dismissed; Judge Thompson ruled on May 22, 2023, that Lake had not provided "clear and convincing evidence or a preponderance of evidence" of misconduct in the election; instead the court received "ample evidence that — objectively speaking — a comparison between voter records and signatures was conducted in every instance [that Lake] asked the Court to evaluate." Thompson noted that Lake's attorneys earlier argued that Maricopa County did not perform signature verification, but later argued that signature verification was performed, but done too quickly. Thompson concluded that it was possible for signature verification to be done quickly and properly when "looking at signatures that, by and large, have consistent characteristics". Meanwhile, Lake's own witnesses testified to performing signature verification for Maricopa County. Thompson did not sanction Lake for her final claim, stating that while there was no clear or convincing evidence for this claim, it was not necessarily "groundless".

=== Independent investigation into printer problems ===
The results of an independent investigation into the 2022 election's printing problems was published in April 2023; the investigation was led by a retired chief justice of the Arizona Supreme Court, Ruth McGregor, who concluded that "the primary cause of the election day failures was equipment failure", and that no evidence gathered gave "clear indication that the problems should have been anticipated". McGregor also detailed: "Two-thirds of the general election vote centers reported no issues with misprinted ballots; approximately 94 percent of election day ballots were not faulty".

=== Arizona Supreme Court ruling ===
On November 7, 2024, the Arizona Supreme Court, on par with previous rulings by trial judges and the Arizona Court of Appeals, rejected Lake's final appeal to overturn the results of the 2022 Arizona gubernatorial election and get a new election before 2026.

== See also ==
- 2022 Arizona elections

== Notes ==
Partisan clients
