= Clay Parikh =

American cybersecurity specialist (born 1962)

- Born: Clay Uday Parikh; December 10, 1962 (age 63)
- Spouse: Kathryn Parikh
- Children: 1

Clay Uday Parikh (born December 10, 1962) is an American cybersecurity specialist.

== Early life and education (1962–1981) ==
Clay Uday Parikh was born on December 10, 1962. Parikh graduated from J.O. Johnson High School in 1981.

== Military service (1981–2003) ==
Parikh joined the United States Marine Corps in June 1980. By September 1987, he had become a sergeant serving with the 2nd Marine Division at Marine Corps Base Camp Lejeune. That month, Parikh was awarded the Good Conduct Medal. He served a tour of duty at the Marine Corps Air Ground Combat Center in Twentynine Palms, California, in 1994 as a staff sergeant. By 2001, he had married Kathryn, with whom he had one child.

== Career ==
=== Cybersecurity work (2003–2022) ===
In his testimony to contest Katie Hobbs's victory in the 2022 Arizona gubernatorial election, Parikh stated that he had audited "classified systems" for Northrop Grumman and had worked for NASA, United States Army Corps of Engineers, and voting machine companies.

=== Election litigation (2022–2026) ===
In 2022, Parikh served as an expert witness in a lawsuit filed by the former television presenter Kari Lake challenging Arizona's use of electronic voting machines. Lake called Parikh as a witness in an effort to overturn her loss in the Arizona gubernatorial election; Parikh testified that he had observed Arizona's 19-inch ballots had been printed on 20-inch paper, but offered no evidence for his claim. He additionally testified in a lawsuit filed by DeKalb County's chapter of the Republican Party against Georgia secretary of state Brad Raffensperger, claiming that he had obtained the encryption keys for snapshots of Dominion Voting Systems's databases.

=== Special government employee (2026–present) ===
In February 2026, ProPublica identified Parikh as a special government employee at the Office of the Director of National Intelligence who had assisted the lawyer Kurt Olsen in the FBI investigation into the 2020 presidential election. According to the affidavit for the raid of the election office for Fulton County, Georgia, the conservative researcher Kevin Moncla asked Parikh to review the county's tabulator tapes in the 2020 election. Parikh's analysis was used to justify the raid.
