= 2018 Arizona Secretary of State election =

- November 6, 2018
- Turnout: 62.77% ▲
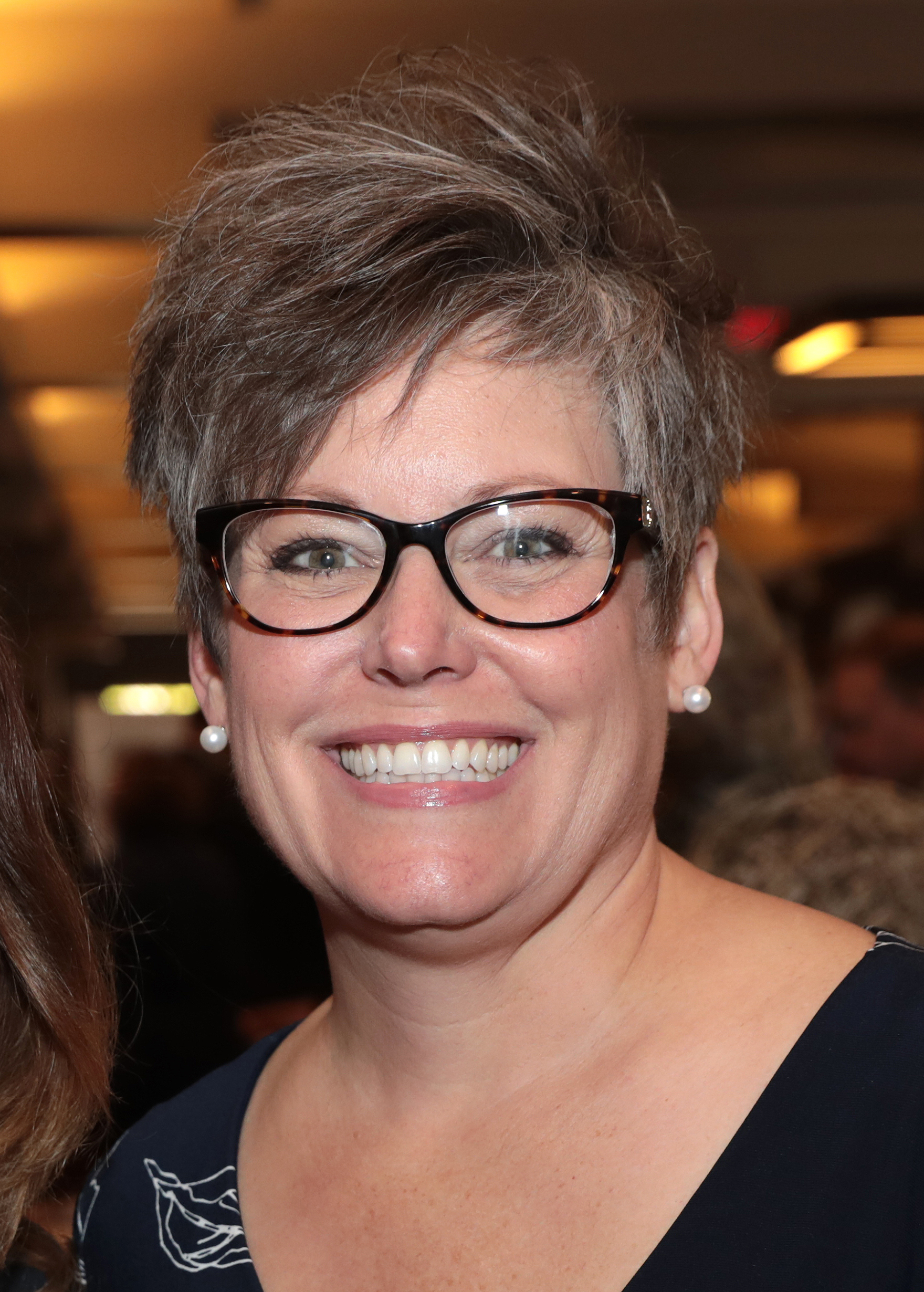

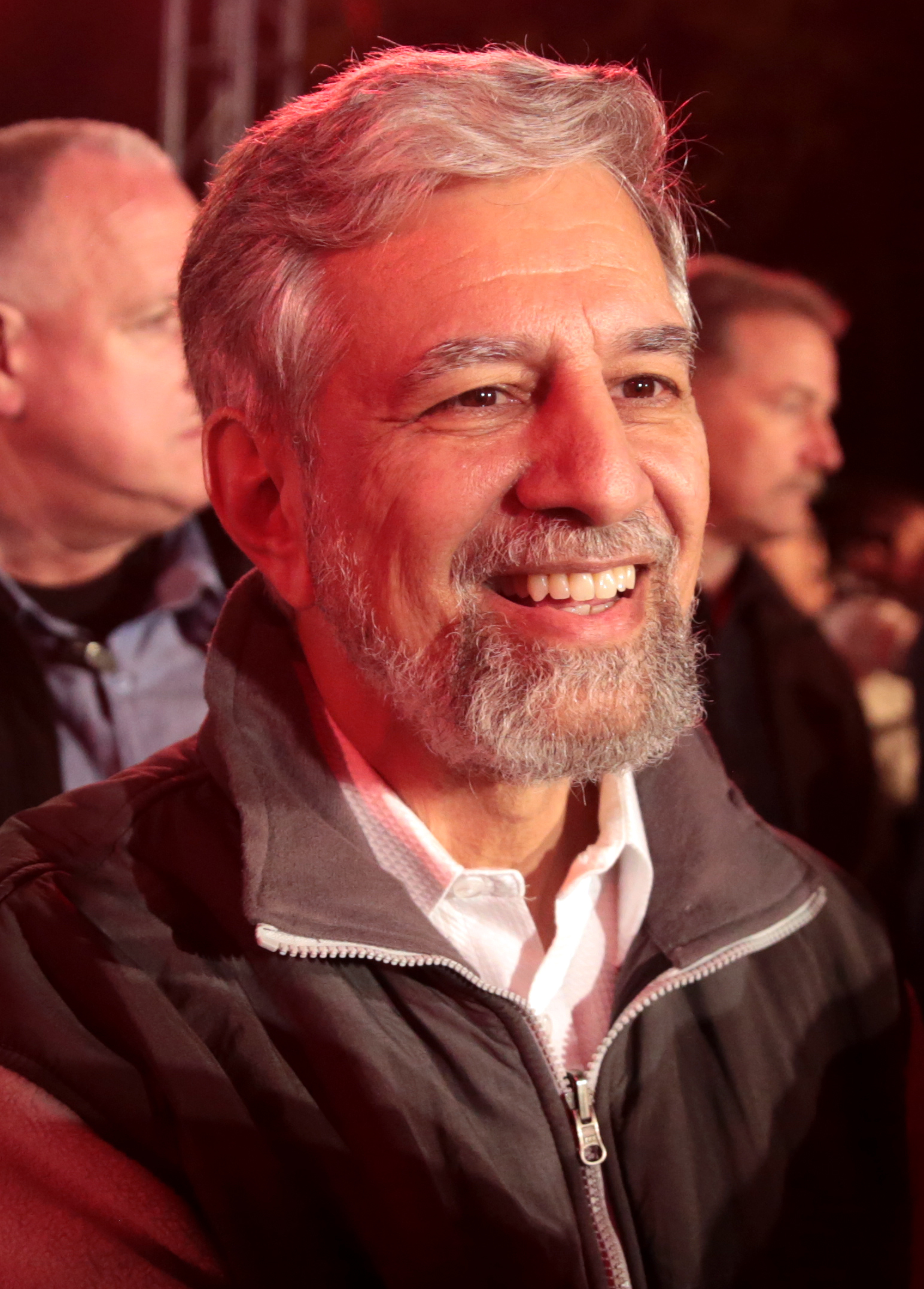
Nominee	Katie Hobbs	Steve Gaynor
Party	Democratic	Republican
Popular vote	1,176,384	1,156,132
Percentage	50.43%	49.56%
- Hobbs: 50–60% 60–70% 70–80% 80–90% >90% Gaynor: 50–60% 60–70% 70–80% 80–90% >90% Tie: 50% No data
Secretary of State before election
Michele Reagan
Republican
Elected Secretary of State
Katie Hobbs
Democratic

The 2018 Arizona secretary of state election took place in the U.S. state of Arizona on November 6, 2018, to elect the secretary of state of Arizona, concurrently with the election of Arizona's Class I U.S. Senate seat, elections to the United States Senate in other states, elections to the United States House of Representatives, and various state and local elections.

Incumbent Michele Reagan was first elected in 2014 and ran for re-election. She was defeated in the Republican primary by Steve Gaynor. State senator Katie Hobbs defeated Gaynor in the general election by a small margin, becoming the first Democratic secretary of state since Richard Mahoney was elected in 1990.

The race was rated "Likely Republican" by Governing.com, but this did not come to fruition as Katie Hobbs pulled off an upset win which, alongside Democrats' victory in the concurrent Senate election, established Arizona's role as a key battleground state.

== Republican primary ==
=== Candidates ===
==== Nominee ====
- Steve Gaynor, businessman

==== Eliminated in primary ====
- Michele Reagan, incumbent secretary of state

==== Declined ====
- Kevin Gibbons, home loan officer
- Steve Montenegro, former state senator and candidate for Arizona's 8th congressional district in 2018

=== Results ===
Results by county: Gaynor—50–60% Gaynor—60–70% Gaynor—70–80%

Republican primary results
Party	Candidate	Votes	%
Republican	Steve Gaynor	414,332	66.69%
Republican	Michele Reagan (incumbent)	206,988	33.31%
Total votes		621,320	100.0%

== Democratic primary ==
=== Candidates ===
==== Nominee ====
- Katie Hobbs, minority leader of the Arizona Senate

==== Not on the ballot ====
- Leslie Pico, businesswoman

==== Withdrew ====
- Mark Robert Gordon, attorney

=== Results ===
Democratic primary results
Party	Candidate	Votes	%
Democratic	Katie Hobbs	465,668	100.0%
Total votes		465,668	100.0%

== General election ==
=== Predictions ===
Source	Ranking	As of
Governing	Lean R	October 11, 2018

=== Polling ===
Poll source	Date(s) administered	Sample size	Margin of error	Steve Gaynor (R)	Katie Hobbs (D)	Other	Undecided
Data Orbital (R)	October 1–3, 2018	550 (LV)	± 4.2%	41%	31%	3%	24%
OH Predictive Insights	October 1–2, 2018	600 (LV)	± 4.0%	50%	36%	–	14%
Gravis Marketing	September 5–7, 2018	882 (LV)	± 3.3%	45%	40%	–	15%
OH Predictive Insights	September 5–6, 2018	597 (LV)	± 4.0%	42%	39%	–	19%

=== Results ===
Arizona secretary of state election, 2018
Party	Candidate	Votes	%	±%
Democratic	Katie Hobbs	1,176,384	50.43%	+2.65%
Republican	Steve Gaynor	1,156,132	49.56%	−2.66%
Write-in		169	0.01%	N/A
Total votes		2,332,685	100.0%	
Democratic gain from Republican				

==== By county ====
County	Katie Hobbs Democratic		Steve Gaynor Republican		Others		Margin		Total
County	#	%	#	%	#	%	#	%	Total
Apache	17,029	68.33	7,889	31.65	4	0.02	9,140	36.68	24,922
Cochise	18,721	41.66	26,204	58.31	17	0.04	-7,483	-16.65	44,942
Coconino	34,120	63.21	19,851	36.78	8	0.01	14,269	26.43	53,979
Gila	7,524	37.01	12,804	62.98	2	0.01	-5,280	-25.97	20,330
Graham	3,476	32.99	7,061	67.01	0	0.00	-3,585	-34.02	10,537
Greenlee	1,084	43.00	1,437	57.00	0	0.00	-353	-14.00	2,531
La Paz	1,608	32.06	3,408	67.94	0	0.00	-1,800	-35.88	5,016
Maricopa	713,045	50.72	692,690	49.27	85	0.01	20,355	1.45	1,405,735
Mohave	18,775	26.56	51,900	73.43	5	0.01	-33,125	-46.87	70,675
Navajo	16,930	47.06	19,040	52.93	3	0.01	-2,110	-5.87	35,970
Pima	226,034	59.24	155,501	40.75	23	0.01	70,533	18.49	381,535
Pinal	49,756	42.90	66,211	57.09	7	0.01	-16,455	-14.19	115,967
Santa Cruz	9,497	71.81	3,729	28.19	0	0.00	5,768	43.62	13,226
Yavapai	38,259	36.66	66,088	63.33	13	0.01	-27,829	-26.67	104,347
Yuma	20,526	47.91	22,319	52.09	2	0.00	-1,793	-4.18	42,845

Counties that flipped from Democratic to Republican

- Greenlee (largest city: Clifton)
- Navajo (largest city: Show Low)

County that flipped from Republican to Democratic

- Maricopa (largest municipality: Phoenix)
