= Kari Lake =

American political figure (born 1969)

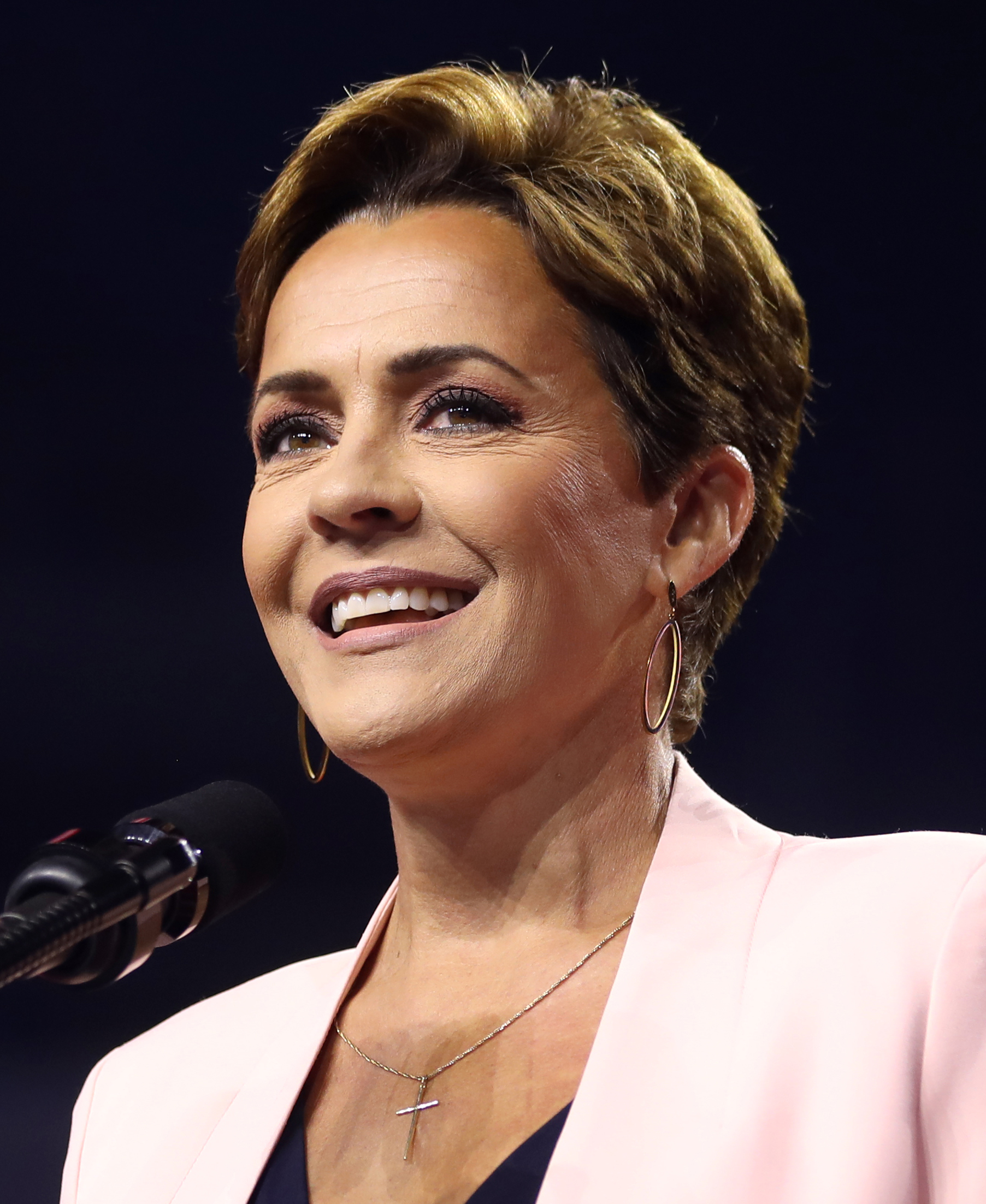
- Lake in 2024

United States Ambassador to Jamaica
- Nominee
- Assuming office TBD
- President: Donald Trump
- Succeeding: N. Nick Perry

Senior Advisor to the United States Agency for Global Media
- Incumbent
- Assumed office March 4, 2025
- President: Donald Trump
- Preceded by: Position established

Personal details
- Born: August 23, 1969 (age 57) Rock Island, Illinois, U.S.
- Party: Republican (before 2006, 2012–present)
- Other political affiliations: Independent (2006–2008); Democratic (2008–2012)
- Spouses: Tracy Finnegan (m. 1991; div. 1993) Jeff Halperin (m. 1997)
- Children: 2
- Education: University of Iowa (BA)

Kari Lake Halperin (née Lake; /ˈkɛəri/ KAIR-ee; born August 23, 1969) is an American political figure and former television news anchor serving as the senior advisor to the United States Agency for Global Media (USAGM) since March 2025. From July 31 to November 19, 2025, she operated as USAGM's deputy CEO and acting CEO; her appointment and tenure were later ruled illegal by Judge Royce Lamberth, voiding all her actions purported to have taken as acting CEO. She is a member of the Republican Party.

Lake began her media career in the early 1990s and was an anchor at Phoenix television station KSAZ-TV from 1999 to 2021, when she left to run for governor. In the 2022 Arizona gubernatorial election, she won the Republican nomination with the endorsement of Donald Trump, and promoted Trump's false claims of winning the 2020 presidential election during her campaign. She lost the general election to Katie Hobbs in one of the closest gubernatorial races that year. She did not concede and filed a lawsuit challenging the results; the case lasted nearly two years and was ultimately rejected by Arizona state courts. She later ran in the 2024 U.S. Senate election in Arizona, where she won the Republican nomination and lost in the general election to Ruben Gallego.

In December 2024, then President-elect Trump announced that he wanted Lake to be appointed as the next director of Voice of America, although the position is not legally appointed or nominated by the president. Lake was sworn in as a special advisor to the USAGM, which is the agency that oversees the Voice of America, on March 3, 2025.

On May 11, 2026, Trump nominated Lake to be the U.S. Ambassador to Jamaica.

== Early life and education ==
Kari Lake was born in 1969, in Rock Island, Illinois, to Larry and Sheila Lake, who were natives of the Wisconsin communities of Richland and Appleton. Larry taught social studies and was a basketball and football coach at North Scott High School, while Sheila was a nurse. Kari is the youngest of nine children.

Lake grew up in Iowa. She graduated from North Scott Senior High School in Eldridge, Iowa, and then received a Bachelor of Arts in communications and journalism from the University of Iowa.

== Media career ==
In May 1991, Lake began working as an intern at KWQC-TV in Davenport, Iowa, while attending the University of Iowa. She later became production assistant before joining WHBF-TV in Rock Island to be a daily reporter and weekend weathercaster in 1992. In August 1994, Lake was hired by KPNX in Phoenix, Arizona, to be the weekend weather anchor; her sister was working in Phoenix at the time, and her parents had retired there. She later became evening anchor at KPNX before relocating to work for WNYT in Albany, New York in the summer of 1998 when she replaced Chris Kapostasy.

Lake returned to Arizona in 1999 and became an evening anchor for KSAZ-TV (Fox 10 Phoenix). While at KSAZ, Lake interviewed President Barack Obama in 2016 and President Donald Trump in 2020.

In her last years working in the media, Lake shared false and unverified information on social media, prompting criticism and acquiring a reputation as a provocateur. In 2018, she opposed the Red for Ed movement, which sought more funding for education through strikes and protests, claiming that movement was a "big push to legalize pot"; she later apologized for the statement (saying that she "made an incorrect conclusion") and, according to the station's regional human resources director, subsequently took an unexpected month-long leave from her position at the station. In July 2019, Lake was caught on "hot mic" footage promoting her account on the web platform Parler. She shared COVID-19 misinformation on Twitter and Facebook in April 2020. Lake's statements and actions made her a divisive figure among colleagues in her last years at the station.

In March 2021, she announced her departure from KSAZ, one day after FTVLive, a television news industry website, published a video clip of Lake at the Conservative Political Action Conference (CPAC) in Orlando, Florida; the website questioned whether Lake was there as a journalist or as a member of a movement. In June 2021, she announced her campaign for governor.

== Political career ==
=== Party switches ===
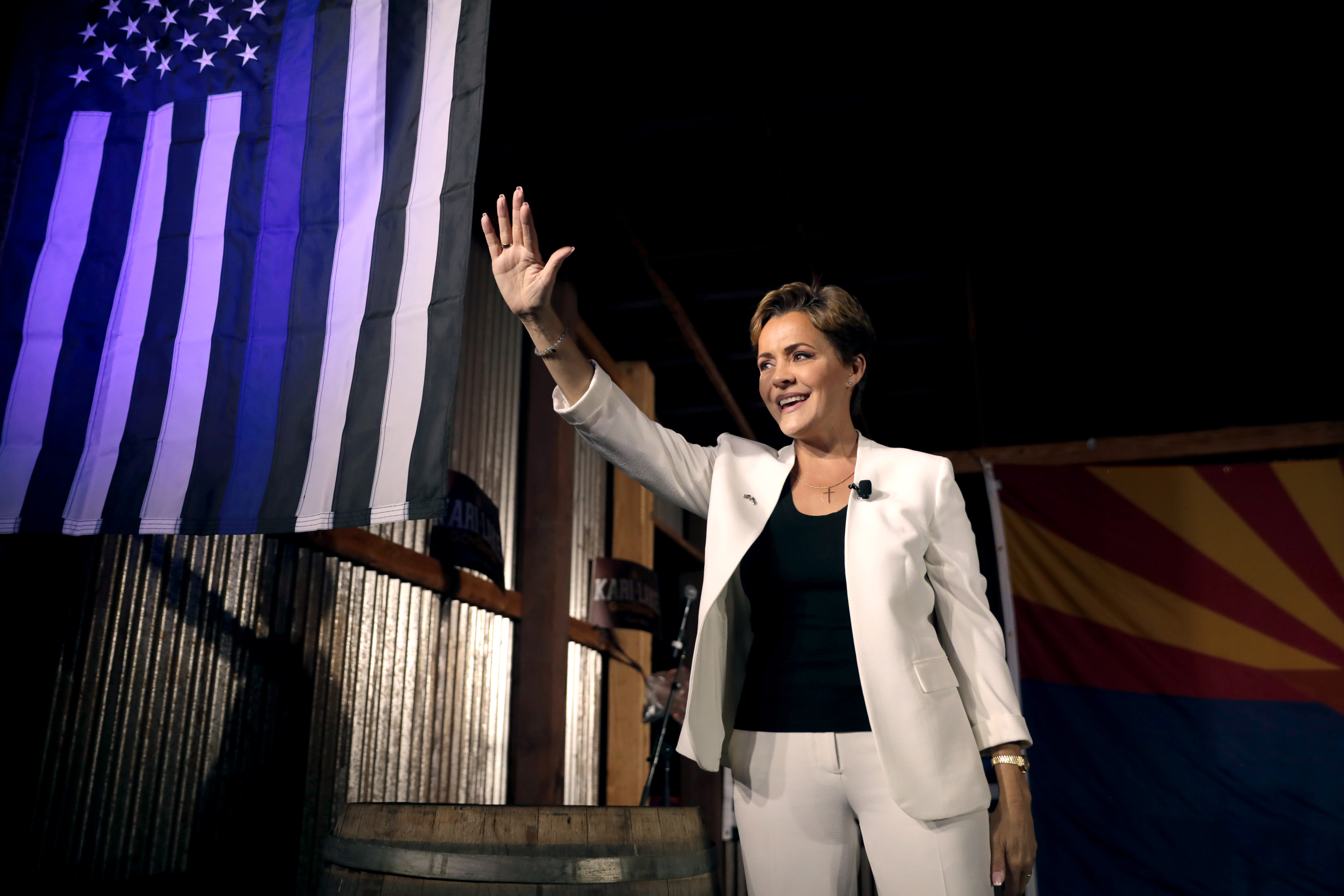
Lake at a campaign event on October 2, 2021, with a thin blue line flag

Lake was a member of the Republican Party until November 3, 2006, when she changed her registration to become an independent. She registered as a Democrat on January 4, 2008, the day after the Iowa Democratic presidential caucuses were won by Obama. Lake returned to being a Republican on January 31, 2012. She explained leaving the Republican Party in 2006 as a reaction to the then-ongoing Iraq and Afghanistan wars. She had supported John Kerry in 2004 and Barack Obama in 2008. She also made several donations to Democratic presidential candidates. After launching her campaign for governor in 2021, Lake cited Trump, Ronald Reagan, and Arizona Republican Party chair Kelli Ward, all former Democrats, as precedent for her party-switching.

=== 2022 gubernatorial run ===
GOP primary results 40–50% Lake 50–60% Lake

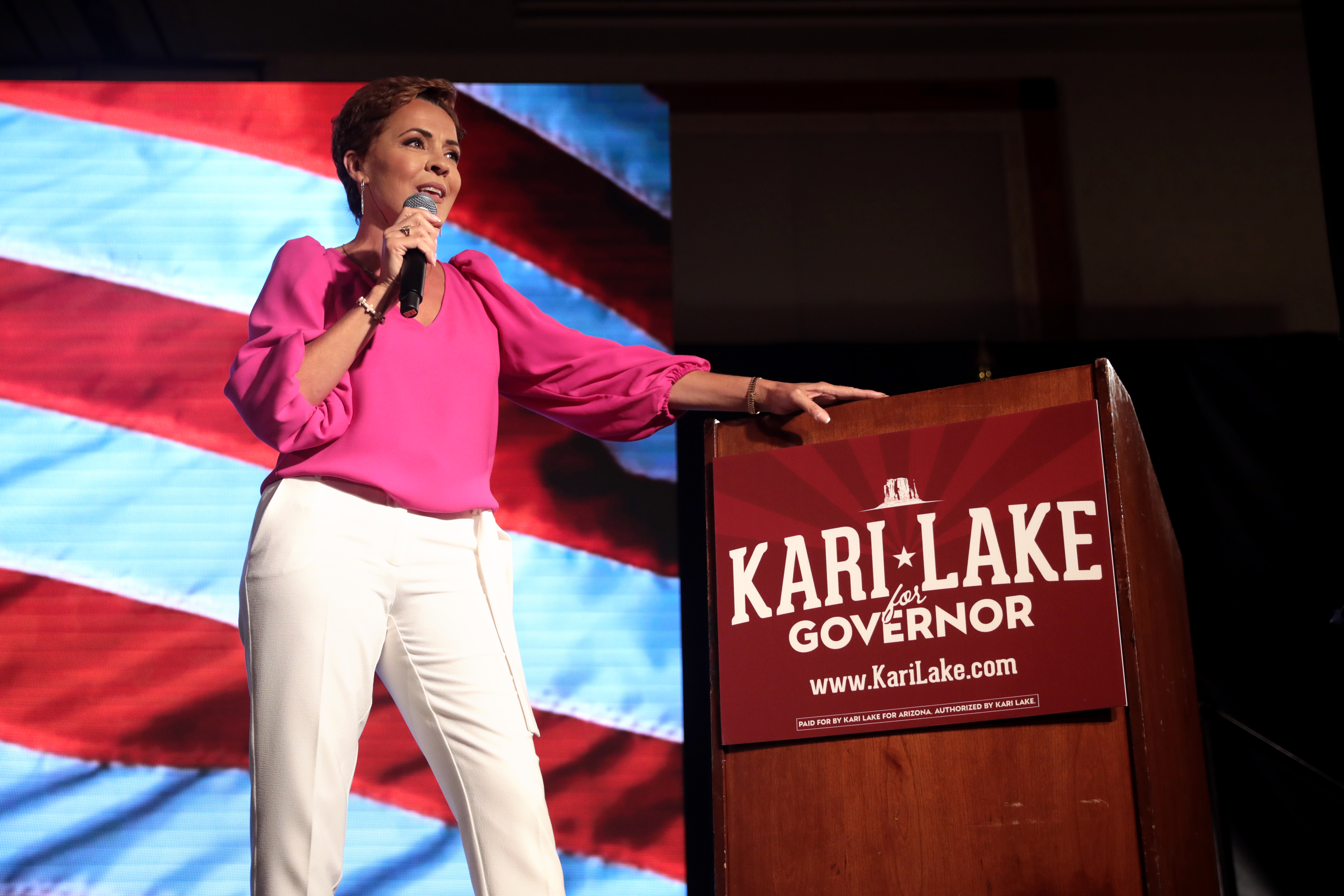
Lake at a campaign event in Scottsdale, Arizona, July 5, 2021

Lake filed paperwork in June 2021 to seek the Republican nomination for governor of Arizona in the 2022 election to succeed incumbent governor Doug Ducey, who was term-limited. Four candidates sought the Republican nomination: Lake; former real estate developer and Arizona Board of Regents member Karrin Taylor Robson; Paola Tulliani Zen, and Scott Neely. Lake and Robson were the front-runners, leading in polling and fundraising. A fifth Republican candidate, ex-congressman Matt Salmon, dropped out of the race after trailing in polls and endorsed Robson.

Throughout her campaign, Lake was described as "a champion of the far-right" movement in the United States. Lake received Donald Trump's endorsement in September 2021. The primary was seen as a "battle" between Republicans aligned with Trump and establishment Republicans. Robson was supported by figures such as former Vice President Mike Pence, governor Ducey, and former New Jersey governor Chris Christie. By the end of 2021, Lake had raised $1.4 million from 12,000 sources. Lake centered her campaign on promoting the false claim that the 2020 presidential election in Arizona and nationwide was "rigged and stolen"; Boris Epshteyn, a former Trump White House aide who promoted Trump's efforts to overturn the election results, attributed her victory in the Republican primary, despite being "outspent 10-to-1," to that stance. Lake won the Republican primary in Arizona on August 2, 2022, winning in all counties.

After winning the Republican primary, Lake said that "we're all big boys and big girls", urging people to "come together"; however, within a week of that victory, Lake said: "We drove a stake through the heart of the McCain machine". Later in early November, Lake participated in a campaign event where she told "McCain Republicans" to "get the hell out!" Lake also called the traditional Republican Party "the party of McCain", and then stated: "Boy, Arizona has delivered some losers, haven't they?" Her statements were in contrast to her past description of John McCain (Arizona's former Republican senator) four years earlier, after his death, as "courageous", "a war hero, icon and a force to be reckoned with".

Democratic gubernatorial candidate Katie Hobbs refused to debate Lake during the election. However, both attended a gubernatorial candidate forum in September 2022, held by the Arizona Chamber of Commerce and Industry, where they separately answered questions.

On November 7, 2022, Lake's campaign stated that on November 6, a campaign staffer "opened an envelope delivered to our campaign office that contained suspicious white powder. It was one of two envelopes that were confiscated by law enforcement" for testing. On November 11, the Phoenix Police Department said that the Arizona state laboratory had tested the items turned over to them by Lake's campaign, and found "no substance" inside. After this revelation, Lake's campaign stated that there actually had been three envelopes, with the first envelope being opened by the staffer having "a white powdery substance along with a hateful letter", but that the staffer threw the first envelope away, and that the trash was emptied before police were informed, with police being handed the other two envelopes.

==== COVID-19 ====
In August 2021, during the COVID-19 pandemic, Lake led anti-mask rallies, calling on Arizona State University students to go against the university's mask mandates. Lake said that as governor she would not tolerate mask and vaccine mandates. In November 2021, Lake told a group of Republican retirees that she was taking hydroxychloroquine to prevent COVID-19 infection. She stated that, as governor, she would work to have hydroxychloroquine and ivermectin produced in the state to "make it easier for us to get these lifesaving drugs". Lake questioned the science behind COVID-19 vaccines and said that she had not been vaccinated.

==== Stolen 2020 election claims ====
Lake had been a leading proponent of the false claim that the 2020 presidential election was "stolen" from Trump. During her campaign, she aligned herself with Trump and centered her candidacy on promoting election lies.

Lake claimed President Joe Biden did not receive 81 million votes and that Arizona (which was won by Biden in the 2020 presidential election) was actually won by Trump. After the 2021 Maricopa County presidential ballot audit found no evidence of election fraud, she demanded the election be "decertified" – a legal impossibility, as such a process does not exist. Lake tweeted quotes made by Sidney Powell on Lou Dobbs Tonight falsely asserting there was a sweeping election fraud conspiracy. She has advocated imprisoning Arizona Secretary of State Katie Hobbs, her Democratic opponent in the gubernatorial race, on baseless and unspecified allegations of criminality related to the 2020 election. Lake also called for imprisoning journalists. Lake repeatedly claimed that defendants arrested in connection with the January 6 United States Capitol attack were "being held in prison without being charged".

Trump endorsed Lake's candidacy, as did pro-Trump Republican figures such as Arizona congressman Paul Gosar and former National Security Advisor Michael Flynn. By contrast, Lake's main primary opponent, Robson, was endorsed by outgoing Republican governor Doug Ducey, as well as Arizona Senate president Karen Fann and Americans for Prosperity. Lake attacked Robson for failing to endorse false claims of election fraud. Lake attended events headed by My Pillow founder Mike Lindell, a prominent promoter of false claims regarding fraud in the 2020 election. During her 2021 campaign for governor, she said that she would not have certified Biden's 2020 election victory in Arizona if she had been governor at the time. During a June 2022 debate among candidates for the Republican nomination, Lake continued to make baseless claims the 2020 presidential election was "stolen" and "corrupt".

Fox News reported in July 2022 that nine days before the 2017 inauguration of Donald Trump, Lake had posted a meme on Facebook that declared the inauguration a "national day of mourning and protest", in which she asked her followers how they would react to Trump's inauguration. She asked "Will you be protesting the inauguration?" and how they might protest. The post was deleted after Fox News asked Lake's campaign about it.

In February 2023, Lake said: "We've got great candidates on the Republican Party and on our side. We've got so many great candidates that if our elections were really fair, I believe the ranks of Congress, the Senate, I think a White House, I think all the state governorships would be Republican if elections were fair".

==== Election loss and refusal to concede ====
In October 2022, Lake twice refused to say that she will accept the result if she lost the election: "I'm going to win the election, and I will accept that result."

Multiple media outlets projected on November 14, 2022, that Lake had narrowly lost the gubernatorial election to Hobbs. Lake's reaction to this was tweeting that "Arizonans know BS when they see it." On November 17, Lake still refused to concede her loss, and announced she was assembling a legal team to challenge the results.

Arizona's election results were certified on December 5, with Lake losing to Hobbs by a margin of over 17,000 votes: Lake received 1,270,774 votes, while Hobbs received 1,287,891 votes. A January 2023 analysis by a trio of election data experts, collectively known as the Audit Guys, concluded that in Maricopa County, over 33,000 voters who voted Republican in down-ballot races chose to vote for Hobbs instead of Lake, while nearly 6,000 Republican leaning voters did not vote in the gubernatorial election or wrote in another candidate instead of Lake; together, these voters could have flipped the result of the election had they voted for Lake. Conversely, the analysis found that Lake received fewer than 6,000 votes from Democrat-leaning voters in Maricopa County. Meanwhile, the Associated Press reported in February 2023 that its survey of over 3,200 voters estimated that 11% of Arizona Republicans had voted for Hobbs, while 4% of Arizona Democrats voted for Lake.

Lake alleged voter disfranchisement due to ballot printing problems and long waiting lines in Maricopa County, which had elections run by local Republican officials. In 70 out of 223 Maricopa County polling sites, voting machine ballots were printed too lightly to be read by tabulators; the problem was caused by a printer setting which had not shown widespread issues during prior testing. If voters did not want to wait in line for the issue to be fixed, they could leave to vote at another Maricopa County polling site, with wait times for polling sites being shown online, and many polling sites had little to no waiting lines, stated Maricopa County election officials. Alternatively, voters could drop their ballots into a secure box ("Box 3"), with these ballots being later tabulated at Maricopa County's elections headquarters, under monitoring from observers from both parties; ultimately, around 17,000 Maricopa County ballots were dropped into Box 3. The Arizona secretary of state's office spokesperson said that "Every voter who went to one of the voting locations affected was still able to cast their ballot", and voting rights experts agreed.

Bill Gates, the Republican chair of Maricopa's Board of Supervisors, partially blamed the long lines on Arizona Republican Party chairwoman Kelli Ward for discouraging voters from using Box 3; she had claimed that Box 3 should not be used as "Maricopa County is not turning on their tabulators downtown today". Lake herself told her supporters to stay in line to vote, while a lawyer for Lake's campaign assuaged concerns about using Box 3 to vote. Lake's campaign filed a lawsuit on Election Day to extend voting for another three hours, but Maricopa County Superior Court Judge Tim Ryan declined to do so, stating: "The court doesn't have any evidence that any voter was precluded from their right to vote".

While Lake alleged that Republican-dominated areas in Maricopa County were disproportionately affected by the printing problems, The Washington Post found that the percentage of registered Republicans in affected precincts (37%) was very close to the percentage of registered Republicans across Maricopa County (35%), and also found that some Democrat-dominated areas also faced the printing problems. Meanwhile, The New York Times analyzed 45 claims of irregularities reported by voters, finding that in 34 of these 45 claims, the voters were able to cast their vote despite an inconvenience; while for the others, three raised problems with voter registration; seven gave unclear accounts as to what exactly happened; and only one said she had been denied the opportunity to vote, though she acknowledged she had arrived at her polling place at the time it closed. Lake self-identified as a "proud election denying deplorable" in December 2022.

Hobbs was sworn in as governor on January 2, 2023. Later in January 2023, Lake posted on Twitter 16 voter signatures, mostly from 2020, suggesting that these were from illegal ballots because the signatures did not match; Arizona law states that "records containing a voter's signature ... shall not be ... reproduced by any person other than the voter", with the exception of those working for the county recorder. She also posted a false claim that almost 250,000 voting attempts failed during the 2022 Arizona elections, without proving that the votes were not counted; during the elections, votes that could not be initially scanned were later counted at another location.

Lake's campaign raised $2.6 million from Election Day until the end of 2022, while taking in even more money from a non-profit fundraising group started by Lake's advisers in December 2022; this group became Lake's main fundraising outlet by February 2023, and is not required to publish donation details. The Arizona Mirror found in January 2023 that less than 10% of the funds raised by Lake after the election were paid to lawyers, despite Lake claiming that the funds were meant for contesting election results.

The results of an independent investigation into the 2022 election's printing problems was published in April 2023; the investigation was led by a retired chief justice of the Arizona Supreme Court, Ruth McGregor, who concluded that "the primary cause of the election day failures was equipment failure", and that no evidence gathered gave "clear indication that the problems should have been anticipated". McGregor also detailed: "Two-thirds of the general election vote centers reported no issues with misprinted ballots; approximately 94 percent of election day ballots were not faulty".

In February 2024, Lake was questioned about her claims about the 2022 gubernatorial election, to which she replied: "I don't know who exactly stole the election, but there are a lot of people who are running elections poorly, and we've seen the results."

==== Defamation lawsuit ====
In June 2023, Maricopa County Recorder Stephen Richer sued Lake for defamation. Richer alleged that Lake had defamed him by repeatedly accusing him of intentionally sabotaging the 2022 election by printing wrong-sized ballots and injecting 300,000 illegal votes into the Maricopa County vote count; he alleged that Lake's statements caused threats against him and his family, and resulted in him being ostracized from Republican donors and networks. In December 2023, a Maricopa County judge denied Lake's motion to dismiss, ruling that Lake's statements were not "rhetorical hyperbole" and would not be protected by the First Amendment to the United States Constitution if they were proven to be false. In 2024, the Arizona Court of Appeals and the Arizona Supreme Court both rejected Lake's appeal, clearing the way for a trial.

In March 2024, Lake requested a hearing for a default judgment against herself in the defamation case, deciding not to contest the defamation claim, and asking for the trial to proceed to the amount of damages she would have to pay Richer. Within days, Judge Adleman ruled that Lake could no longer claim in court that she had not defamed Richer, because under "well-established Arizona law – a defaulted party loses all rights to litigate the merits of the cause of action". In November 2024, the court stated that Lake and Richer had settled the defamation case.

=== 2022 election lawsuits ===
==== Pre-election federal suit ====
In April 2022, Lake and Mark Finchem sued state officials, seeking to ban electronic voting machines from being used in her 2022 election. In August 2022, U.S. District Judge John Tuchi dismissed the suit, writing that Lake and Finchem "articulated only conjectural allegations of potential injuries" and thus lacked standing. In his ruling, Tuchi also cited the Eleventh Amendment to the United States Constitution, as well as the Purcell principle. In December 2022, Tuchi sanctioned Lake's lawyers in this suit, including Alan Dershowitz, for making "false, misleading, and unsupported" assertions during the case, and making claims without "an adequate factual or legal basis grounded in a reasonable pre-filing inquiry"; he ordered the plaintiffs to pay the defendants' attorney fees. Tuchi said the sanctions would show that the court does not tolerate litigants "furthering false narratives that baselessly undermine public trust at a time of increasing disinformation about, and distrust in, the democratic process". The sanction amount was set by Tuchi to be roughly $122,000.

Finchem and Lake's appeal, aimed at banning electronic voting machines, was rejected in October 2022 by the United States Court of Appeals for the Ninth Circuit, which highlighted that "counsel for plaintiffs conceded that their arguments were limited to potential future hacking, and not based on any past harm", and voiced agreement "with the district court that plaintiffs' speculative allegations that voting machines may be hackable are insufficient to establish an injury". Finchem and Lake in March 2024 appealed to the United States Supreme Court, which rejected their lawsuit in April 2024. Finchem and Lake then appealed again to the Ninth Circuit, which tersely denied the appeal in June 2024.

==== Post-election state lawsuits ====
On December 9, 2022, after Arizona certified the election results, Lake filed a new suit in state court, seeking a court order to either overturn Hobbs' victory and declare Lake as the winner of the election, or redo the election in Maricopa County. Lake's complaint alleged that there were hundreds of thousands of illegal votes in the election, but provided no evidence in support of these claims. On December 19, Maricopa County Superior Court Judge Peter Thompson, who was appointed by Republican governor Jan Brewer, dismissed eight of ten counts of Lake's lawsuit (specifically, her claims of invalid signatures on mail-in ballots, incorrect certification, inadequate remedy, and violations of freedom of speech, equal protection, due process, the secrecy clause, and constitutional rights). The judge allowed the remaining two counts (Lake's claim that election officials intentionally interfered with Maricopa County ballot printers and with the chain of custody of Maricopa County ballots) to go to trial, specifying that Lake would need to prove at trial that the allegations were true and that the alleged actions actually changed the election.

During the two-day trial, Northrop Grumman information security officer Clay Parikh, a witness called by Lake, testified that some ballots had printing errors that would cause tabulation issues, but these misprinted ballots would ultimately be counted after duplicates were made. On December 24, Judge Thompson dismissed Lake's remaining case, writing: "Every single witness before the Court disclaimed any personal knowledge of such [intentional] misconduct. The Court cannot accept speculation or conjecture in place of clear and convincing evidence". The judge further ruled that "printer failures did not actually affect the results of the election", noting that a witness called by Lake testified that "printer failures were largely the result of unforeseen mechanical failure."

A day after the ruling was issued, Lake's Twitter page attacked the judge in this case, linking to a Townhall article to baselessly claim that "his decision was ghostwritten" by "top left-wing attorneys like Marc Elias.'" No evidence supported the tweet's claim, and the tweet was deleted the next day, after Secretary Hobbs filed a motion to sanction Lake. On December 27, Judge Thompson ordered Lake to pay Hobbs $33,000 in fees for expert witnesses and a ballot inspector due to the lawsuit, but did not sanction Lake for filing the lawsuit. Lake appealed the dismissal and the order directing her to pay $33,000 in fees.

A three-judge panel of the Arizona Court of Appeals unanimously rejected Lake's appeal on February 16, 2023. The court found that "Lake's only purported evidence" that long lines at voting centers "had any potential effect on election results was, quite simply, sheer speculation"; that "Lake presented no evidence that voters whose ballots were unreadable by on-site tabulators were not able to vote" (and, indeed, that Lake's own cybersecurity expert testified to the contrary); and that the evidence in the trial record showed that "voters were able to cast their ballots, that votes were counted correctly and that no other basis justifies setting aside the election results".

Lake sought to appeal to the Arizona Supreme Court. On March 22, 2023, the Court denied Lake's request to hear her lawsuit. The Court issued a five-page order ruling that the lower courts had correctly dismissed six of Lake's seven legal claims, determining that these challenges were "insufficient to warrant the requested relief under Arizona or federal law." For Lake's remaining legal claim (on signature verification), the Arizona Supreme Court ruled that the lower courts incorrectly interpreted her challenge as pertaining to signature verification policies themselves, instead of the application of such policies, and remanded (sent back) the remaining claim to the trial court. After a three-day trial, Maricopa County Superior Court Judge Peter Thompson ruled against Lake for her remaining claim on May 22, 2023, thus re-affirming Hobbs' election. Thompson wrote that Lake had not provided "clear and convincing evidence or a preponderance of evidence" of misconduct in the election, while there was "ample evidence that – objectively speaking – a comparison between voter records and signatures was conducted in every instance [Lake] asked the Court to evaluate." Thompson noted that Lake's attorneys earlier argued that Maricopa County did not perform signature verification, but later argued that signature verification was performed, but done too quickly. Thompson concluded that it was possible for signature verification to be done quickly and properly when "looking at signatures that, by and large, have consistent characteristics". Lake was not sanctioned by Thompson for her final claim, as he ruled that while there was no clear or convincing evidence for this claim, it was not necessarily "groundless".

The Arizona Supreme Court in May 2023 ruled that it was employing "the extraordinary remedy of a sanction" on Lake's lawyers, imposing a $2,000 fine on them for making "false factual statements to the Court". Lake's lawyers had falsely claimed in legal filings that it was an "undisputed fact that 35,563 unaccounted for ballots were added to the total of ballots [at] a third party processing facility; in imposing its sanction, the Arizona Supreme Court stated that "no evidence" supported the claim that 35,563 ballots were added, and that Lake's claim had been disputed by the other side, making the claim of an "undisputed" fact "unequivocally false".

During Lake's appeal of Thompson's ruling against her final claim, she tried to appeal directly to the Arizona Supreme Court, which denied her motion to do so in July 2023, citing "no good cause" for Lake to skip appealing to the Arizona Court of Appeals. Lake's appeal was rejected by the Arizona Court of Appeals in June 2024, with Judge Sean Brearcliffe stating that Lake had claimed "8,000 uncounted votes", but this could not overcome her loss margin of over 17,000 votes to Hobbs, and while Lake claimed she had new evidence to present, Brearcliffe found that she already possessed the evidence previously, but did not "analyze" it. Lake appealed to the Arizona Supreme Court in July 2024, which declined in November 2024 to hear Lake's appeal, ensuring that the lower courts' rulings were maintained, which ended Lake's legal challenge against the 2022 result.

In April 2023, Lake sued Maricopa County Recorder Stephen Richer, seeking to compel him to produce 1.3 million ballot affidavit envelopes, containing voters' signatures, names, addresses, and phone numbers. After a September 2023 trial, Maricopa County Superior Court Judge John Hannah ruled against Lake in November 2023. The court ruled that release of voters' personal information would bring a "significant risk of widespread voter fraud where none now exists"; would expose voters to harassment, loss of privacy, and identity theft; and had the potential to discourage voting. In March 2024, Lake abandoned her appeal of Hannah's ruling.

=== 2024 Senate run ===
Lake announced her candidacy for the 2024 United States Senate election in Arizona on October 10, 2023. In November 2023, Politico noted that Lake had pivoted from the fire-and-brimstone approach of her gubernatorial campaign to a more diplomatic approach, seeking to mend relationships with Republicans she had previously attacked. The Hill also noted that Lake "sought to strike a more conciliatory tone with Republicans" compared to her 2022 campaign.

In January 2024, Lake publicly called for Arizona Republican Party chair Jeff DeWit to resign for being "corrupt and compromised", with DeWit resigning a day later. Before the resignation, a recording of Lake and DeWit conversing in March 2023 had been published by right-wing talk show host Garret Lewis. In the recording, DeWit told Lake that "back east", "there are very powerful people who want to keep you out" of the 2024 Arizona Senate race and "they're willing to put their money where their mouth is, in a big way", for Lake to "take a pause for a couple of years", while Lake responded: "I can't be bought." Lake called the incident a "bribery scandal", while DeWit accused Lake acting in a "deceptive" manner by releasing "a selectively edited audio recording" made when Lake was employed by DeWit. According to DeWit, he had previously advised Lake to "postpone her campaign and aim for the Governor's position in two years". DeWit explained his resignation as due to "Lake's team" demanding it or he would "face the release of a new, more damaging recording". In response, two of Lake's advisors denied having "threatened or blackmailed" DeWit.

In February 2024, she spoke at CPAC, saying she was "tired of beta men" and wanted "some alpha men." In April, when discussing the 2024 election campaign, Lake said that the "next six months are going to be difficult. If you are not ready for action, and I have a feeling with as many veterans and former law enforcement, active law enforcement ... you guys are ready for it [...] they're going to come after us with everything. That's why the next six months is going to be intense. [...] We are going to put on the armor of God. And maybe strap on a Glock on the side of us just in case."

Lake was defeated by Democratic nominee Ruben Gallego in the November 2024 general election. Lake received around 80,000 fewer votes compared to Gallego. In mid-November 2024, as vote counting was still ongoing, The Washington Post contrasted how Lake was losing by 2% in Arizona when fellow Republican Donald Trump was simultaneously winning by almost 6% in Arizona.

=== 2025 ===
Donald Trump in 2024 had indicated Lake as his choice to lead the Voice of America, but in early 2025, the U.S. Agency for Global Media, which oversees the Voice of America, announced that she would serve as a special advisor.

Kari Lake's leadership at USAGM/VOA has faced criticism for reducing resources and limiting the Persian service's reach during Iran tensions. In January 2026, according to The Hill and claims by three VOA Persian employees, management under controversial adviser Ali Javanmardi faces allegations of politically motivated editorial interference in pursuit of a particular political agenda, including the systematic censorship of coverage reflecting the views of a large segment of the Iranian population opposed to the Islamic Republic, as well as the suppression of certain public figures.

A Washington Post report, citing two VOA Persian employees, reveals heavy censorship under Kari Lake and Ali Javanmardi, including a strict ban on mentioning the best-known dissident of the Islamic Republic and the most recognized opposition figure, Reza Pahlavi, even when reporting on protesters' chants. Guests and staff who reference him reportedly face reprimands, warnings, or blacklisting, effectively silencing coverage of a leading dissident opposing the Islamic Republic. According to The Hill, on March 6, VOA Persian journalist and prominent Iranian human rights activist Ahmad Batebi claims he was fired days after confronting senior adviser Ali Javanmardi over systematic censorship that blocked coverage of anti-regime protesters in Iran who represent a significant portion of opposition voices, including their support for certain exiled figures, related slogans, and motivations for taking to the streets to topple the Islamic Republic.

== Political positions ==
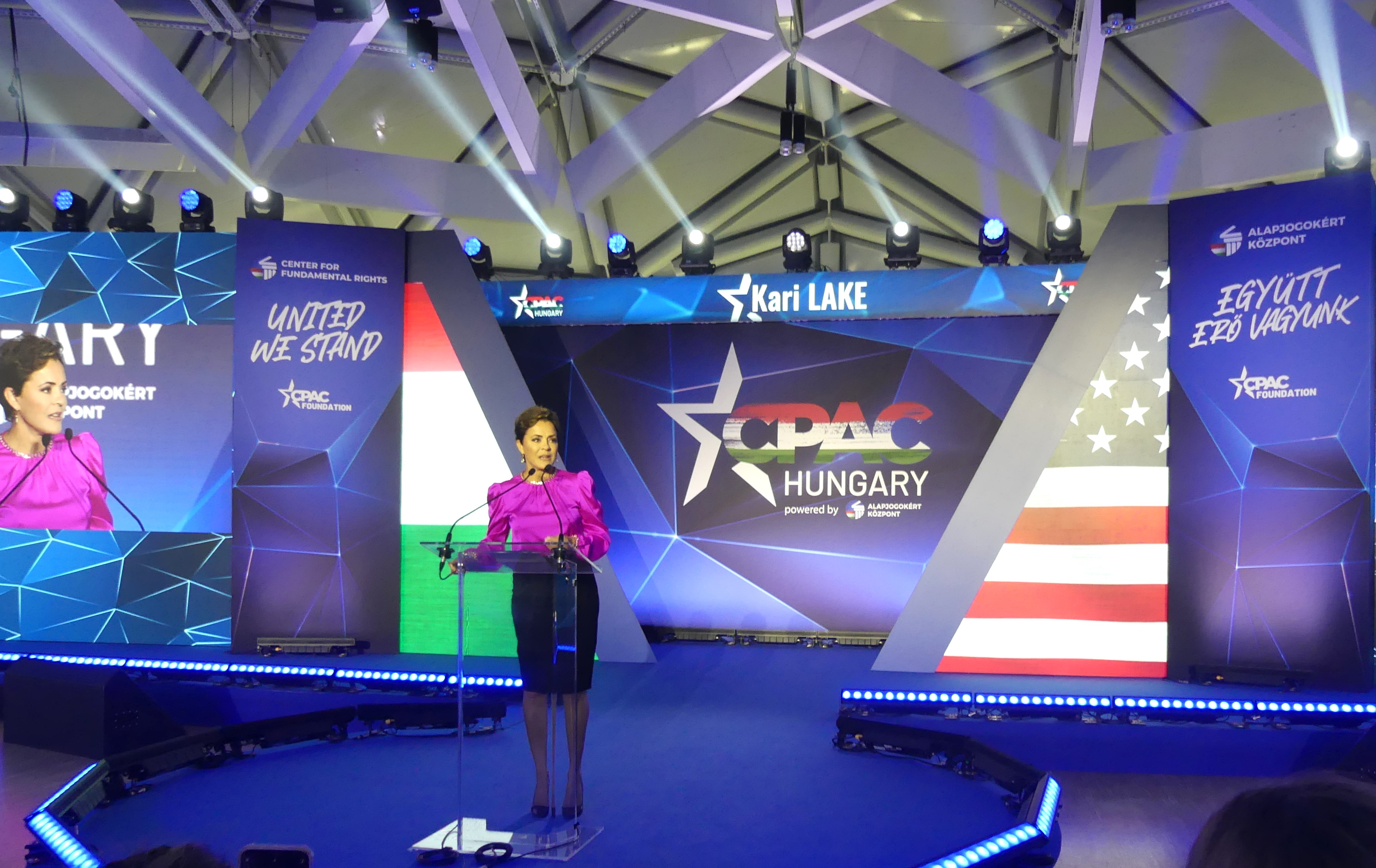
Lake at the CPAC Hungary in Budapest

Lake identifies as a conservative Republican and described herself in 2022 as a "Trump candidate". She accused President Joe Biden and Democrats of harboring a "demonic agenda".

=== Abortion ===
In 2022, Lake said that she considers abortion to be "the ultimate sin". She praised the June 2022 Supreme Court decision in Dobbs v. Jackson Women's Health Organization, which held that there was no federal right to abortion under the U.S. Constitution, and overturned Roe v. Wade. In 2022, Lake repeatedly expressed support for an 1864 law from the Arizona Territory period that prohibited abortion in Arizona except to save the life of a mother (saying she was "incredibly thrilled that we are going to have a great law that's already on the books"), and she called for other states to adopt similar laws. In November 2023, Lake reaffirmed her support for the 1864 abortion ban.

After Democrats enjoyed electoral success by campaigning for abortion rights, Lake began to distance herself from the law. In early 2024, Lake shifted positions; her website said that she "does not support a federal ban on abortion" and in a March 2024 interview she denounced the 1864 anti-abortion law. Lake instead supported Arizona's abortion restriction after 15 weeks. On April 11, 2024, after the Arizona Supreme Court ruled in favor of enforcing the 1864 territorial law, Lake said the law was "out of step with Arizonans" and urged Arizonan legislators to "come up with an immediate common sense solution that Arizonans can support"; she described abortion as "a personal and private issue." Days later, on April 16, she discussed people's ability to sidestep the 1864 law in Arizona by traveling to neighboring states: "Even if we have a restrictive law here ... you can go three hours that way, three hours that way, and you're going to be able to have an abortion".

Thereafter, on April 20, 2024, Lake changed her position again, returning to her earlier position of supporting the 1864 law, after Governor of Arizona Katie Hobbs and Arizona Attorney General Kris Mayes indicated that they would not prosecute offenders of the 1864 law. Lake said: "The Arizona Supreme Court said this is the law of Arizona. But unfortunately the people running our state have said we're not going to enforce it. So, it's really political theater. [...] We don't have that law, as much as many of us wish we did."

=== Other views ===
In an op-ed for the Independent Journal Review, Lake wrote that as governor she would deport illegal immigrants that enter Arizona without seeking federal approval and complete unfinished portions of the Mexico–United States border wall.

Lake was criticized for deeming drag queens as being potentially harmful to children despite having attended drag events herself in the past. Following the criticism, she clarified that she supports adults being able to attend drag shows, while Lake's campaign spokesperson, Ross Trumble, also did acknowledge that Lake's daughter, a minor at the time, attended a private event where a drag queen "showed up as a Marilyn Monroe impersonator." In 2015, Lake stated on social media that she supported an adult's and young person's right to gender transition, but later reversed that position saying in 2022 that both gender and sex are determined at birth. After her election loss, she was listed as an honoree and presenter at Mar-a-Lago for the December 15, 2022, "Spirit of Lincoln Gala," an event held by the Log Cabin Republicans, a political action committee for LGBTQ Republicans. In 2024, the Log Cabin Republicans endorsed Lake's Senate campaign.

In an interview with 60 Minutes Australia journalist Liam Bartlett, Lake asserted that Australians "have no freedom" due to strict Australian gun laws.

== Personal life ==
Lake has been married to Jeff Halperin since August 1998. They have two children. She was previously married to Tracy Finnegan, an electrical engineer.

Lake grew up as a Catholic. She previously identified as a Buddhist before 2015 according to her friends. As of 2022, Lake identifies as an Evangelical Christian.

== Electoral history ==
=== 2022 ===
Republican primary results 2022 Arizona gubernatorial election
Party	Candidate	Votes	%
Republican	Kari Lake	398,860	47.97%
Republican	Karrin Taylor Robson	358,662	43.13%
Republican	Matt Salmon (withdrawn)	30,704	3.69%
Republican	Scott Neely	25,876	3.11%
Republican	Paola Tulliani-Zen	17,281	2.08%
Write-in		105	0.01%
Total votes		831,508	100.0%

2022 Arizona gubernatorial election
Party	Candidate	Votes	%	±%
Democratic	Katie Hobbs	1,287,891	50.32%	+8.48%
Republican	Kari Lake	1,270,774	49.65%	−6.35%
Write-in		820	0.03%	+0.01%
Total votes		2,559,485	100.0%	
Turnout		2,592,313	62.56%	
Registered electors		4,143,929		
Democratic gain from Republican				

=== 2024 ===
Republican primary results 2024 United States senate election in Arizona
Party	Candidate	Votes	%
Republican	Kari Lake	409,339	55.28%
Republican	Mark Lamb	292,888	39.56%
Republican	Elizabeth Jean Reye	38,208	5.16%
Total votes		740,435	100.0%

2024 United States Senate election in Arizona
Party	Candidate	Votes	%
Democratic	Ruben Gallego	1,676,335	50.1%
Republican	Kari Lake	1,595,761	47.7%
Green	Eduardo Heredia Quintana	75,868	2.3%
Write-in		850	0.0%
Total votes		3,348,814	100%
Democratic gain from Independent			

Party political offices
Preceded by Doug Ducey	Republican nominee for Governor of Arizona; 2022	Succeeded by Andy Biggs
Preceded by Martha McSally	Republican nominee for U.S. Senator from Arizona (Class 1); 2024	Most recent
