= Charles Crismon =

Miller

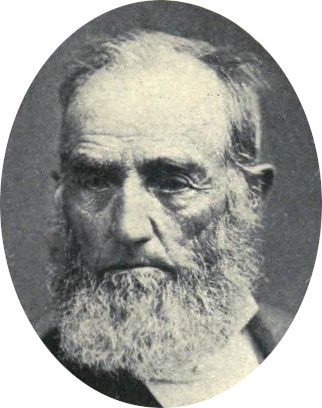
- Born: December 25, 1805; Hopkinsville, Kentucky
- Died: March 23, 1890 (aged 84); Lehi, Mesa
- Burial place: City of Mesa Cemetery
- Occupation: Mill owner

Charles Crismon (December 25, 1805 – March 23, 1890) was an American miller who helped establish the city of Mesa, Arizona. He was baptized into The Church of Jesus Christ of Latter-day Saints at the age of 32 and contributed to the growth and development of the church. Crismon died on March 23, 1890, aged 84 in Lehi, Mesa.

== Early life ==
Charles Crismon was born on December 25, 1805, in Hopkinsville, Kentucky, as the 10th child of George A. Chrisman and Elizabeth Hagler, whose ancestors were from Germany and France. He had two sisters and 10 brothers.

In 1830, Crismon moved to Jackson County, Illinois, where he purchased an 80-acre homestead. He then started building mills and farming, and married his first wife, Mary Hill.

=== Conversion and early church service ===
In c. 1838, Crismon was baptized and joined The Church of Jesus Christ of Latter-day Saints. Following his conversion, he and his family moved further west to Missouri, along with other members of Christianity, to settle there. After migrating and spending about two years in Utah, building mills to support the growing church, Crismon sought new opportunities for himself and members of his family.

In April 1849, Crismon and his family left Utah and moved to California in early July. There, he started working as a miner. Around this time, certain leaders and members of the Church of Jesus Christ of Latter-day Saints began to practice polygamy. Those instructed to do so complied because they believed it was instructed by God at that time. Because of these revelations, Crismon began to practice plural marriage and later married four more women throughout his life.

After living in California, Crismon moved back to Utah in 1858, where he began to work in mining coal and precious metals, raising stock, and the railroad business for 12 years. During the period, he would continue to build mills for grinding grain into flour. Crismon's mills, along with other mills, were run by water wheels that would slowly break down the grains by grinding them against stones in the mill.

== Family ==
Crismon's parents were George A. Chrisman and Elizabeth Hagler. George was born around 1765 and died in 1850, while Elizabeth was born around 1772 and died in 1848.

Crismon's siblings were Henry Chrisman, John Buchanan Chrisman, Michael Chrisman, George Crismon Jr., Jacob Chrisman, Barbara Maria Bobbit (née Chrisman), Catherine Craine (née Chrisman), Peter Crismon, David Chrisman, James Chrisman, and William Chrisman.

Crismon met Mary Crismon (née Hill) while in Illinois, and they were married shortly after on May 6, 1830, in Morgan County, Illinois. After moving to Utah, he became involved in polygamy and married four other women over the next 13 years. The first was Maria Gray Crismon (née Pearson), whom he married on July 16, 1854, in Salt Lake City, Utah. Louise Christina Crismon (née Bischoff) was his third wife, whom he married on May 10, 1862, in Salt Lake City. On the same day, he also married Ellen Wilcox in Salt Lake City. His last wife was Cristiana Amelia Crismon (née Hessel), whom he married on October 12, 1867, in Salt Lake City (when she was 15 years old).

Crismon is the father of 36 children.

- Mary Crismon was the mother of 12 children: Martha Jane Lewis (née Crismon), George C. Crismon, James Crismon, Esther Ann Sirrine (née Crismon), Samantha Chase (née Crismon), Mary Ann Horne (née Crismon), Charles Crismon Jr., Emily Prescinda Weiler (née Crismon), Ellen Shurtleff (née Crismon), John Franklin Crismon, Cynthia Adeline Crismon, and Walter Scott Crismon.
- Louise Kristone Crismon was the mother of 12 children: Alfred Charles Crismon, Ernest L Crismon, Oscar Hugh Crismon, Joseph Benjamin Crismon, Josephine Louvina Ellsworth (née Crismon), David Crismon, Nettie May Crismon, Hermon Eugene Crismon, Ada Amanda Byers (née Crismon), Louise Alexandra Harper (née Crismon), Charles B. Crismon, and George Franklin Crismon.
- Mary Gray Crismon was the mother of William Crismon.
- Ellen Wilcox was the mother of the 10 children: Annie Eliza Crismon, Elizabeth Williams (née Crismon), Mary Adeline Johnson (née Crismon), Olive Crismon, Clara Louise Johnson (née Crismon), Frederick Wilcox Crismon, Herbert John Crismon, Della Gertrude Chapman (née Crismon), Nellie Williams (née Crismon), and Carl Crismon.
- Christine Amelia Crismon was the mother of Annie Telula Nelson (née Crismon).

== Trek with the Latter-day Saints ==
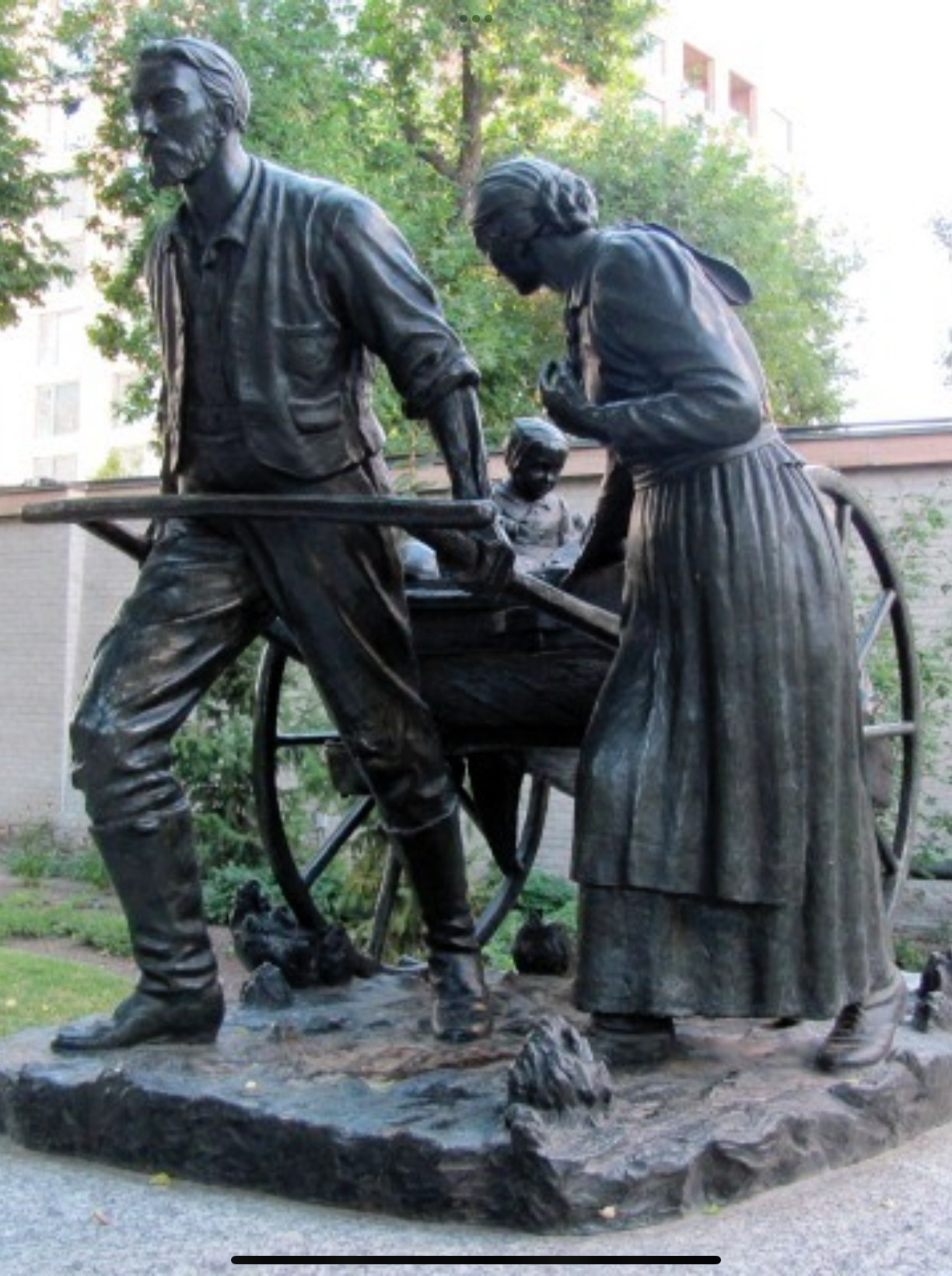
Statue of pioneer handcart

After Crismon was baptized into the Church of Jesus Christ of Latter-day Saints, he joined the Early Latter-day Saint Pioneers' movement. He assisted in moving Joseph Smith, the founder and prophet of the Church of Jesus Christ of Latter-day Saints at that time, to Missouri from Ohio. Thereafter, he brought his family there.

From 1846 to 1847, Crismon went to Mississippi to help pioneer families move west, after being called on a church mission by Brigham Young. The families then met up at Fort Laramie with the other saints to prepare for travel to the Salt Lake Valley in Utah. Crismon brought all of his milling equipment with him so that once they made it to the Salt Lake Valley, he could start building mills. He successfully did so, building the first mill in the region. Shortly after, Charles built an additional mill, then sold both to Brigham Young in 1848.

Crismon built the first flour mill that aided in grinding wheat for the Saints who trekked west in the Salt Lake Valley. After spending a short time in California, he spent 12 years in Utah, before being asked to help the Saints settle in Arizona. In 1876, thirteen families were called to settle in the state, beginning a larger movement of people going from Utah to Arizona. Later, two more companies (First Mesa Company and Second Mesa Company) joined them in southern Arizona, the first of which included Crismon and his family.

== Founding of Mesa ==
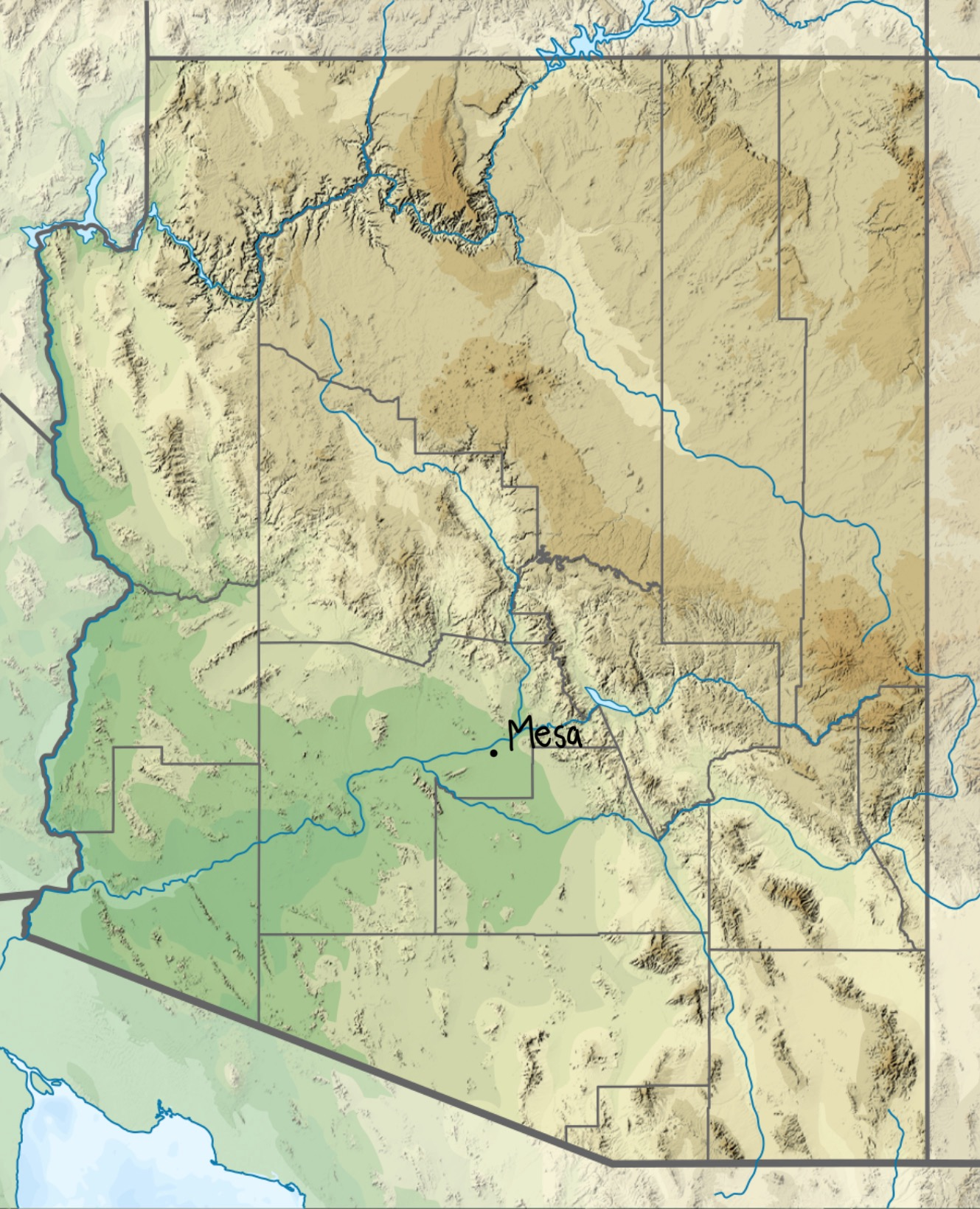
Map of Mesa, Arizona

On September 26, 1877, Crismon left for Arizona, and arrived in early 1878 with the First Mesa Company, which consisted of 25 wagons and a large herd of livestock. Despite being invited to join the pioneers in the Lehi settlement, the First Mesa Company settled just south on a mesa that contained the old canal systems. The Second Mesa Company followed shortly after and joined them on the mesa, which would later take the name of its landform, Mesa. Due to Lehi being flood-prone, Mesa quickly outgrew Lehi. Crismon helped establish Mesa and assisted in agricultural advancements with his mills. Near the end of his life, he was still engaged in milling, as he was promoting a plan to transport water south of Mesa through a canal system.

== Legacy ==
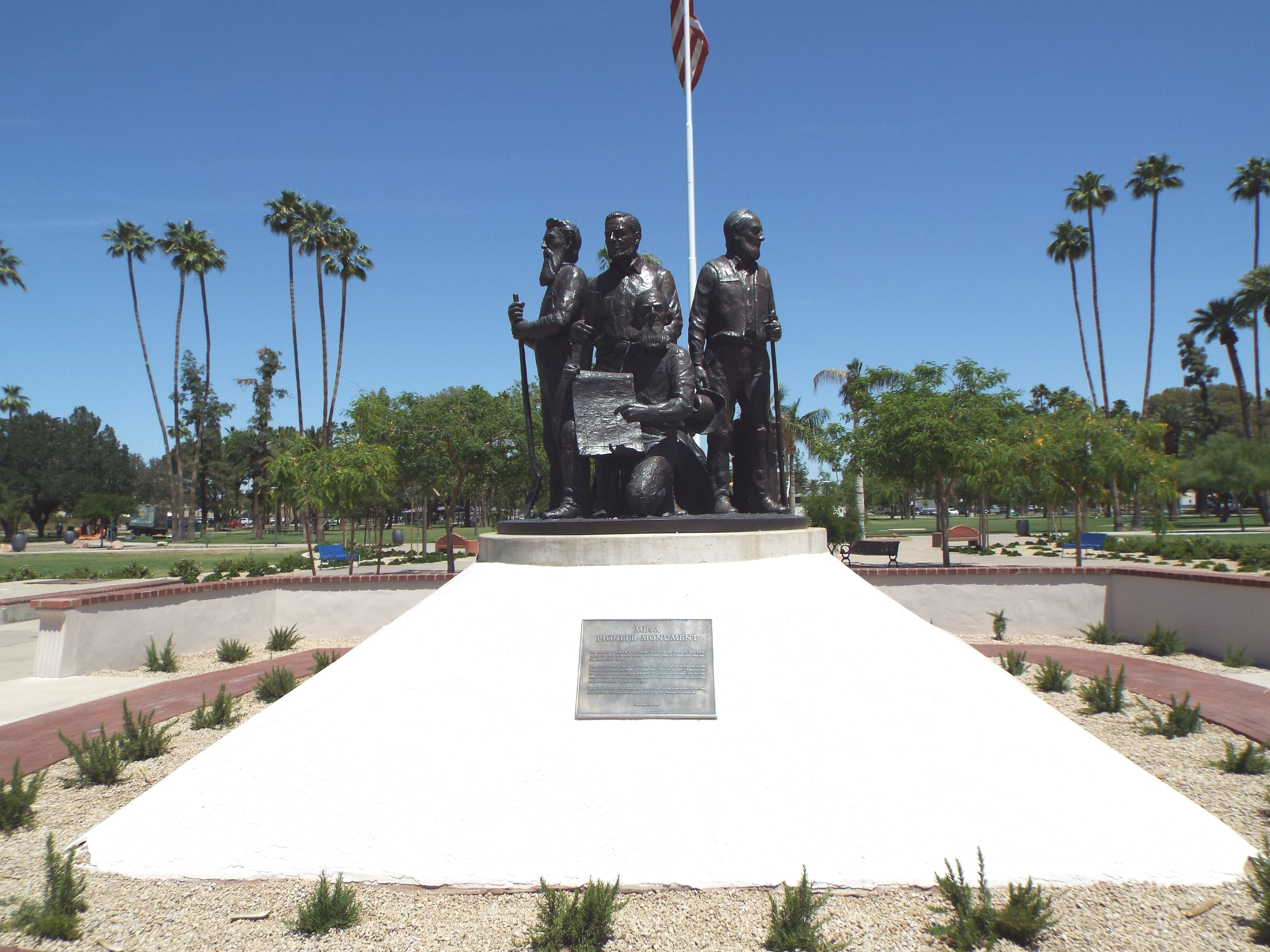
Monument in Pioneer Park, Mesa Arizona.

In addition to helping settle Mesa, Arizona, Crismon served 3 missions for the Church of Jesus Christ of Latter-day Saints at the ages of 34, 38, and 71. He died at the age of 84, then was buried in Maricopa County, Arizona. To commemorate his accomplishment of helping people travel to "settle" and develop the Mesa area, a statue was built in Pioneer Park in Mesa. IThe statue serves as a reminder to all who visit of the legacy of the founders of Mesa, including Crismon, Charles I. Robson, George W. Sirrine and Francis M. Pomeroy, and their sacrifices.

In 2024, one of Crismon's descendants, Mark Freeman, was elected Mayor of Mesa in the mayoral elections.
