= 2024 Mesa mayoral election =

- July 30, 2024 (primary); November 5, 2024 (runoff)
- Turnout: 30.7% (primary); 81% (runoff)
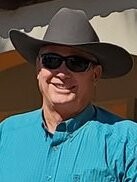

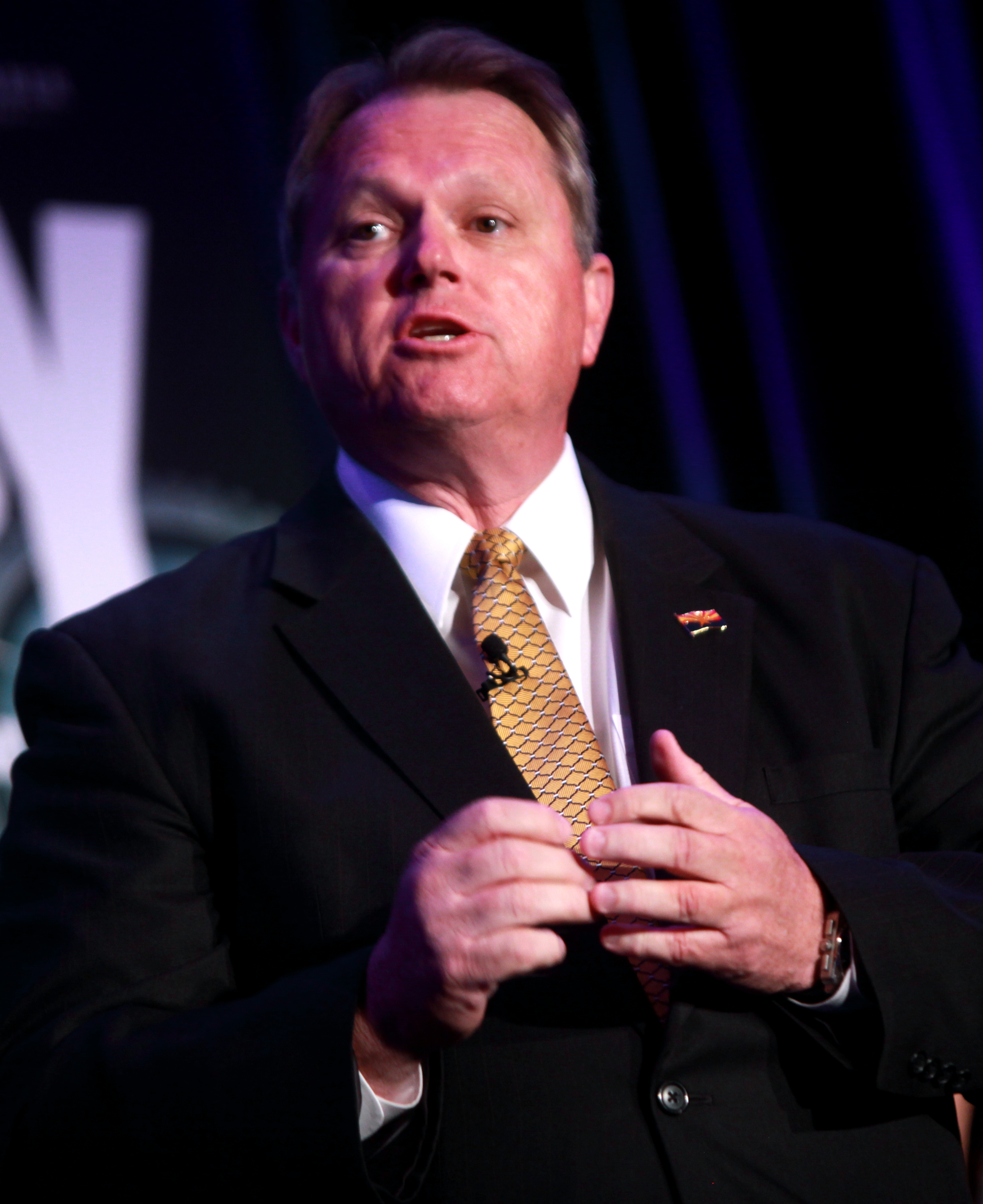

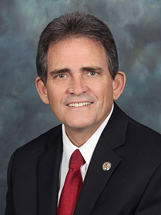
Candidate	Mark Freeman	Scott Smith	Ryan Winkle
Primary	21,312; 28.65%	21,633; 29.08%	10,964; 14.74%
Runoff	100,718; 52.88%	89,740; 47.12%	Eliminated
Candidate	Scott Neely	R. Carey Davis
Primary	10,353; 13.92%	9,909; 13.32%
Runoff	Eliminated	Eliminated
Mayor before election
John Giles
Republican
Elected mayor
Mark Freeman
Republican

The 2024 Mesa mayoral election was held on November 5, 2024, to elect the next mayor of Mesa, Arizona. Incumbent Republican mayor John Giles was term limited and could not run for re-election.

A primary election for candidates was held on July 30, 2024, from which city councilor Mark Freeman and former mayor Scott Smith advanced to a runoff, in which Freeman defeated Smith with 52.9 percent of the vote.

== Candidates ==
=== Advanced to runoff ===
- Mark Freeman, city councilor from the 1st district (2016–present)
- Scott Smith, former mayor (2008–2014) and former CEO of Valley Metro

=== Eliminated in primary ===
- R. Carey Davis, former mayor of San Bernardino, California (2014–2018)
- Scott Neely, concrete pumping contractor and candidate for Governor of Arizona in 2022
- Ryan Winkle, former city councilor from the 3rd district (2016–2017)

== Results ==
=== Primary election ===
2024 Mesa mayoral election
Candidate	Votes	%
Scott Smith	21,633	29.08
Mark Freeman	21,312	28.65
Ryan Winkle	10,964	14.74
Scott Neely	10,353	13.92
R. Carey Davis	9,909	13.32
Write-in	220	0.30
Total votes	74,391	100.00

=== Runoff election ===
2024 Mesa mayoral runoff election
Candidate	Votes	%
Mark Freeman	100,719	52.9%
Scott Smith	89,740	47.1%
Total votes	190,458	100%

== See also ==
- 2024 Arizona elections
- List of mayors of Mesa, Arizona
