= 2020 Mesa mayoral election =

- August 4, 2020
- Turnout: 30.9%
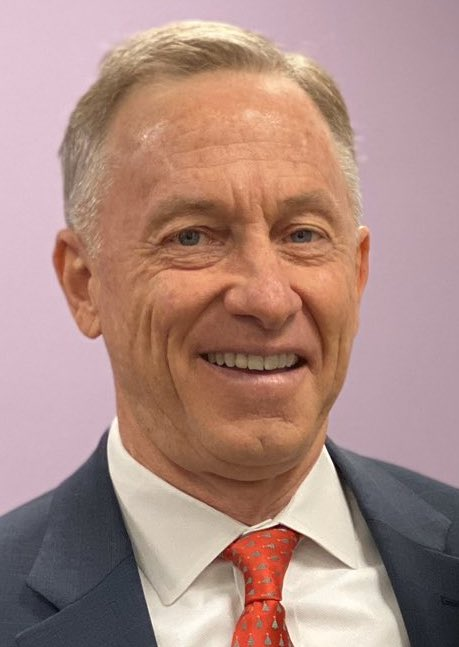

Candidate	John Giles	Verl Farnsworth
Party	Nonpartisan	Nonpartisan
Popular vote	60,473	30,452
Percentage	66.3%	33.4%
- Precinct results Giles: 50–60% 60–70% 70–80% No votes
Mayor before election
John Giles
Republican
Elected mayor
John Giles
Republican

The 2020 Mesa mayoral election was held on August 4, 2020, to elect the mayor of Mesa, Arizona.

Incumbent mayor John Giles was re-elected to a second full term.

== Candidates ==
=== Declared ===
- Verl Farnsworth, retired construction contractor
- John Giles, incumbent mayor

=== Declined ===
- Jeremy Whittaker, city councilman

== Results ==
2020 Mesa mayoral election
Candidate	Votes	%
John Giles (incumbent)	60,473	66.25
Verl Farnsworth	30,452	33.36
Write-in	357	0.39
Total votes	91,282	100.00

== See also ==
- List of mayors of Mesa, Arizona
