= Katie Hobbs =

Governor of Arizona since 2023

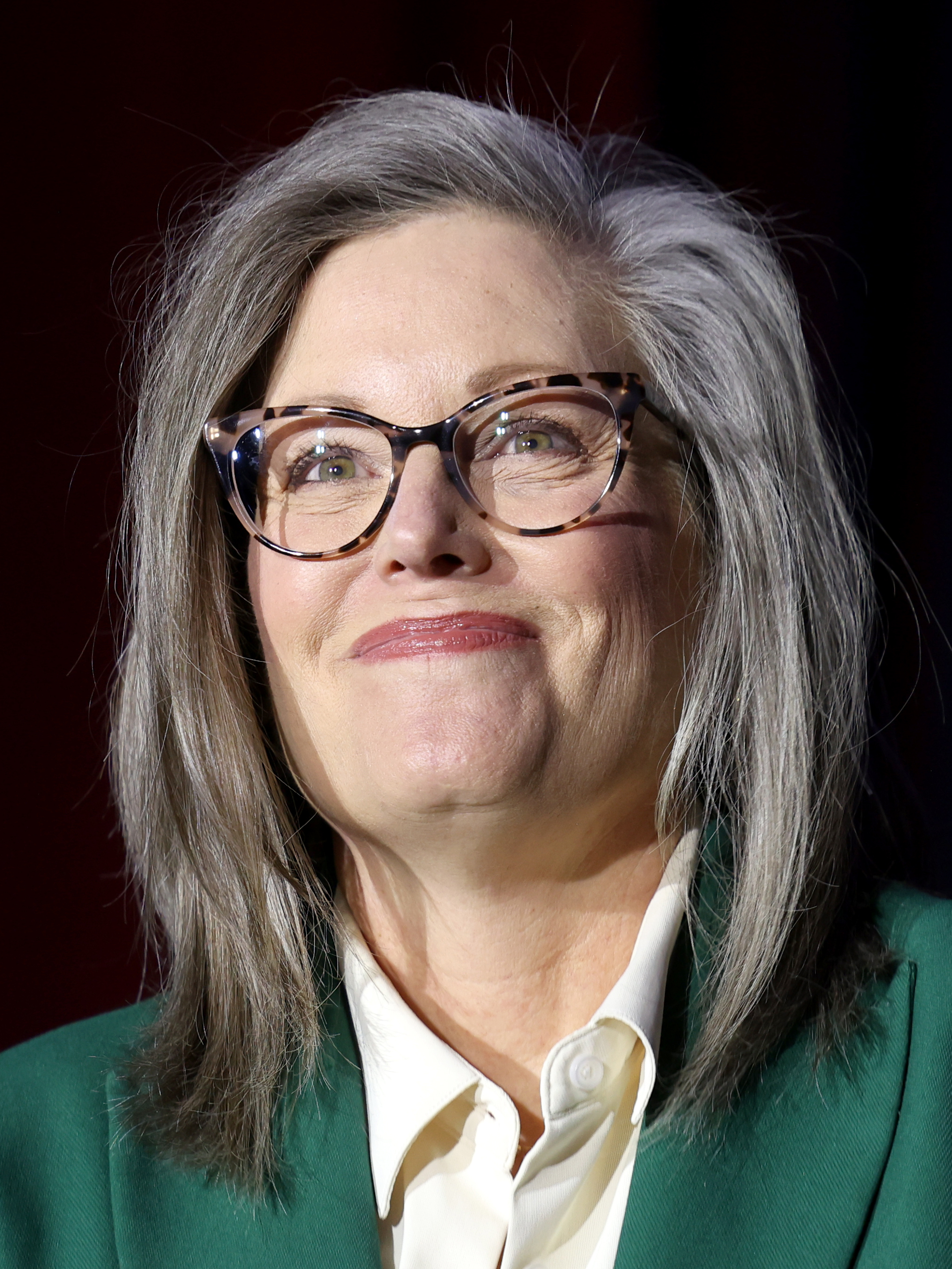
- Hobbs in 2026

24th Governor of Arizona
- Incumbent
- Assumed office January 2, 2023
- Lieutenant: John Giles (elect)
- Preceded by: Doug Ducey

21st Secretary of State of Arizona
- In office January 7, 2019 – January 2, 2023
- Governor: Doug Ducey
- Preceded by: Michele Reagan
- Succeeded by: Adrian Fontes

Minority Leader of the Arizona Senate
- In office January 5, 2015 – January 7, 2019
- Preceded by: Anna Tovar
- Succeeded by: David Bradley

Member of the Arizona Senate from the 24th district
- In office January 7, 2013 – January 7, 2019
- Preceded by: Don Shooter
- Succeeded by: Lela Alston

Member of the Arizona House of Representatives from the 15th district
- In office January 10, 2011 – January 7, 2013
- Preceded by: David Lujan; Kyrsten Sinema
- Succeeded by: John Allen (redistricted)

Personal details
- Born: Kathleen Marie Hobbs; December 28, 1969 (age 56) Phoenix, Arizona, U.S.
- Party: Democratic
- Spouse: Patrick Goodman (m. 1996)
- Children: 2
- Education: Northern Arizona University (BSW); Arizona State University (MSW)
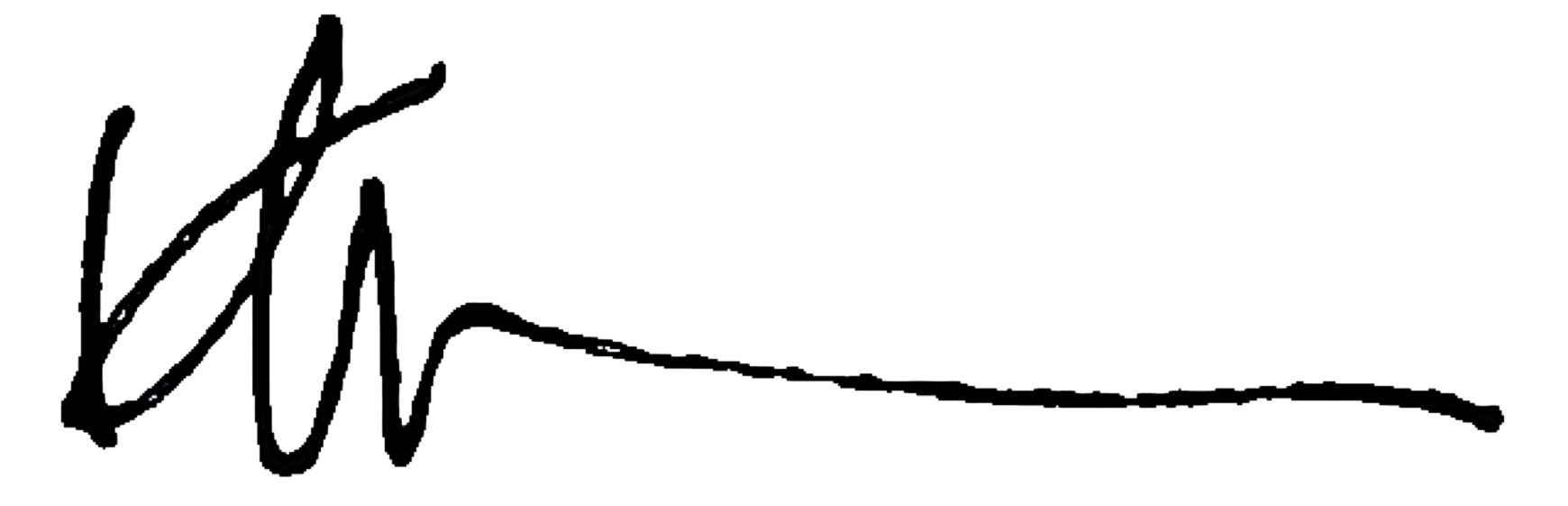
- Signature
- Website: Office website Campaign website

Kathleen Marie Hobbs (born December 28, 1969) is an American politician and social worker serving since 2023 as the 24th governor of Arizona. A member of the Democratic Party, she served from 2019 to 2023 as Arizona's Secretary of State and from 2011 to 2019 as a member of the Arizona Legislature.

Born and raised in Arizona, Hobbs holds degrees in social work from Northern Arizona University and Arizona State University. She was elected to the Arizona House of Representatives in 2010 and to the Arizona Senate in 2012, where she served as Senate minority leader from 2015 to 2019. In 2018, she was elected secretary of state of Arizona. In 2022, Hobbs was elected governor, narrowly defeating Republican nominee Kari Lake, and was reelected in 2026.

During her time in office, Hobbs has set the record for vetoes issued during a single legislative session as well as during a single term as governor.

== Early life, education, and career ==
Hobbs was born on December 28, 1969, in Phoenix, Arizona. She has a twin sister, Becky. A first-generation Arizonan, Hobbs grew up in Tempe, an inner suburb of Phoenix. Her family was middle-class and sometimes relied on food stamps. She went to Catholic schools throughout her childhood and graduated from Seton Catholic High School in 1988.

Hobbs attended Northern Arizona University, where she received a bachelor's degree in social work in 1992. She later attended Arizona State University, where she received a master's degree in social work in 1995. She worked as a social worker for some time afterward.

Hobbs was the chief compliance officer for Sojourner Center, one of the nation's largest domestic violence centers. She is an adjunct professor of social work at Paradise Valley Community College and Arizona State University. She is affiliated with the National Association of Social Workers professional organization.

== Early political career ==
Before seeking elected office, Hobbs participated in political leadership programs in multiple organizations, including Valley Leadership, Emerge Arizona, and the Center for Progressive Leadership. She was a delegate for Hillary Clinton at the 2008 Democratic National Convention.

Hobbs served on the Phoenix Women's Commission and the Phoenix Human Services Commission.

Hobbs was the executive director of Emerge Arizona from 2013 to 2019. Hobbs credited her interest in politics to her involvement with Emerge Arizona.

=== Arizona House of Representatives ===
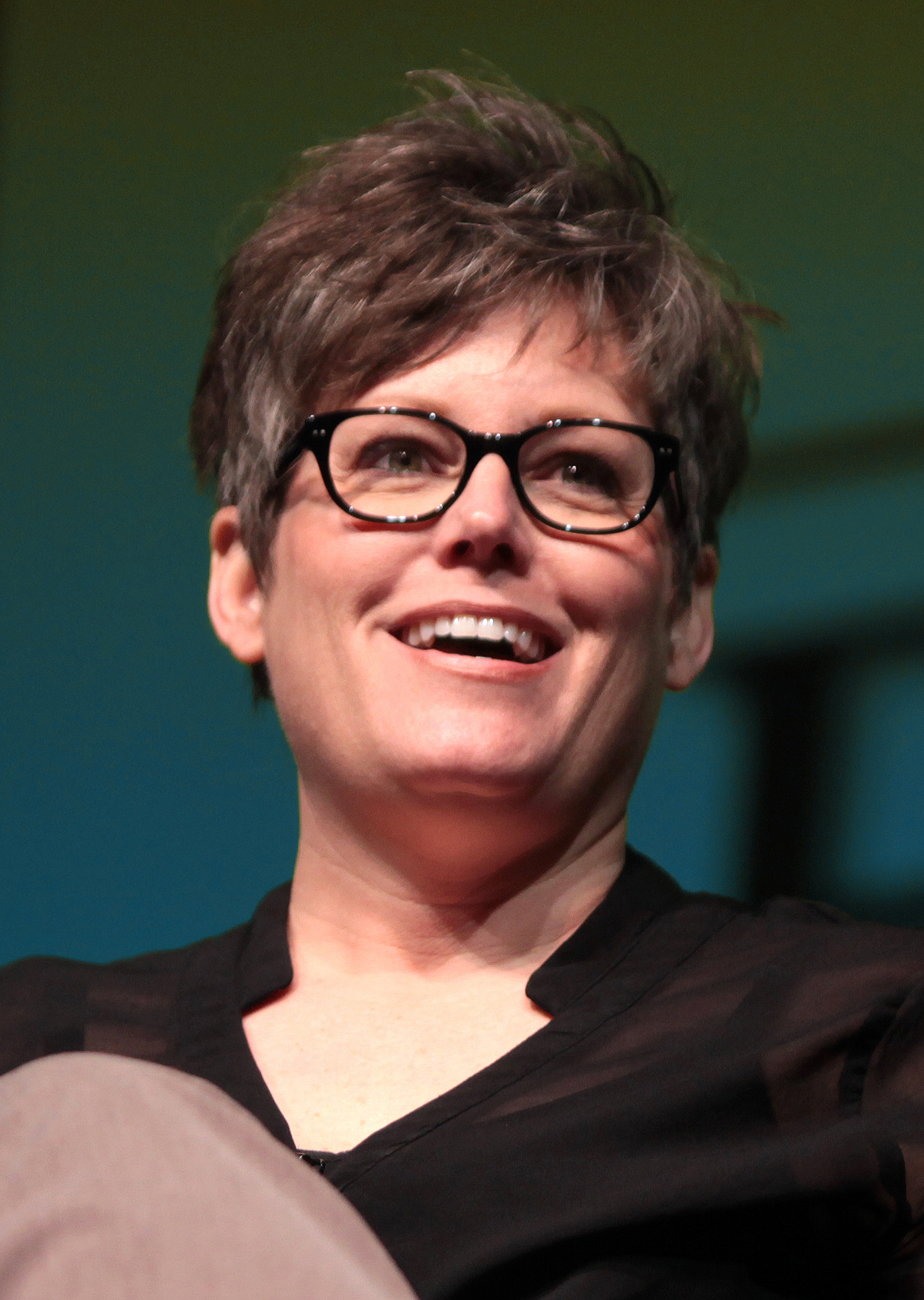
Hobbs in 2015, speaking at a Phoenix event

Hobbs was elected to the Arizona House of Representatives in 2010. She represented the 15th legislative district alongside Lela Alston.

Hobbs served one term in the House of Representatives and ran for state senate in 2012.

=== Arizona Senate ===
Hobbs was elected to the Arizona Senate in 2012 and reelected in 2014 and 2016. She represented the 24th legislative district. She originally did not want to run for state senate but did so due to redistricting. Hobbs became minority leader in 2015 and served two terms in that position.

In 2015, during her first term as minority leader, Senate staffer Talonya Adams, a Black woman, complained to Hobbs about her concerns about racial and gender-based discrimination and was later fired in part by Hobbs. In November 2021, Adams won a discrimination lawsuit related to her firing and was awarded a judgment of $2.75 million.

Hobbs did not run for another term in the State Senate, deciding to run for Secretary of State. She was succeeded by Alston.

== Secretary of State of Arizona (2019-2023) ==
=== 2018 election ===
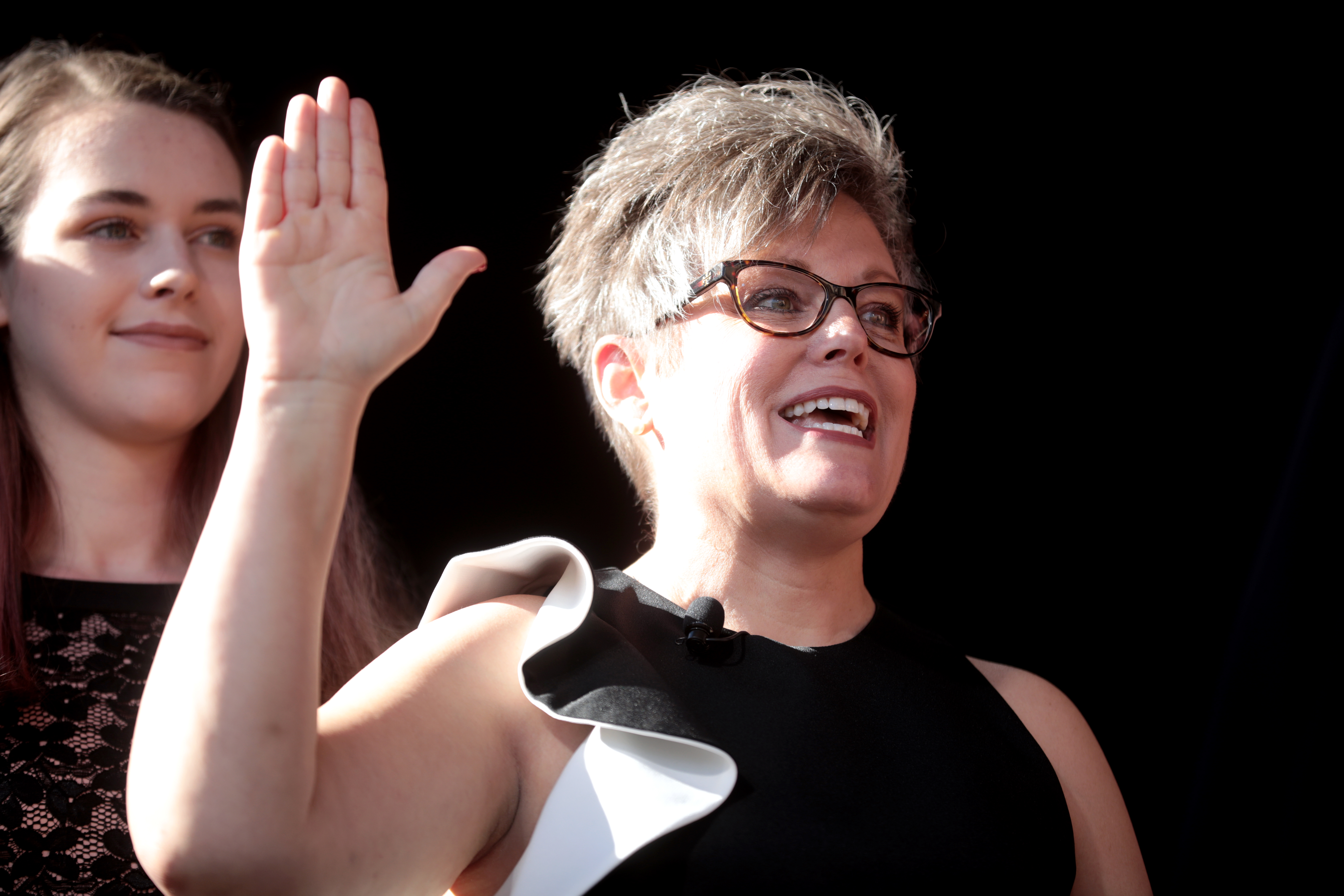
Hobbs sworn in as Secretary of State in 2019

On March 8, 2017, Hobbs announced her candidacy for Arizona secretary of state. In the 2018 election, she faced Republican nominee Steve Gaynor. On November 6, 2018, the Associated Press prematurely called the race for Gaynor. With the race as close as it was, neither Hobbs nor Gaynor initially claimed victory. In subsequent days, Gaynor's lead narrowed as more ballots were counted. On November 16, Hobbs was officially declared the winner by a margin of 20,000 votes. She was the first Democrat to hold the post since Richard Mahoney left office in 1995.

=== Tenure ===
Hobbs was sworn in as secretary of state on January 7, 2019. Since Arizona did not then have a lieutenant governor, Hobbs stood first in the line of succession to Governor Doug Ducey.

==== 2020 Arizona election audit ====
In 2021, the Arizona Senate Republicans provided $150,000 to fund an audit aimed at contesting the 2020 presidential election results in Maricopa County. In a six-page letter, Hobbs wrote that the audit's chain of custody was lacking, calling it "a significant departure from standard best practices". She added that the audit procedures appeared "better suited for chasing conspiracy theories than as a part of a professional audit". In response, Hobbs received death threats, and the Arizona Department of Public Safety assigned personnel to guard her and her staff.

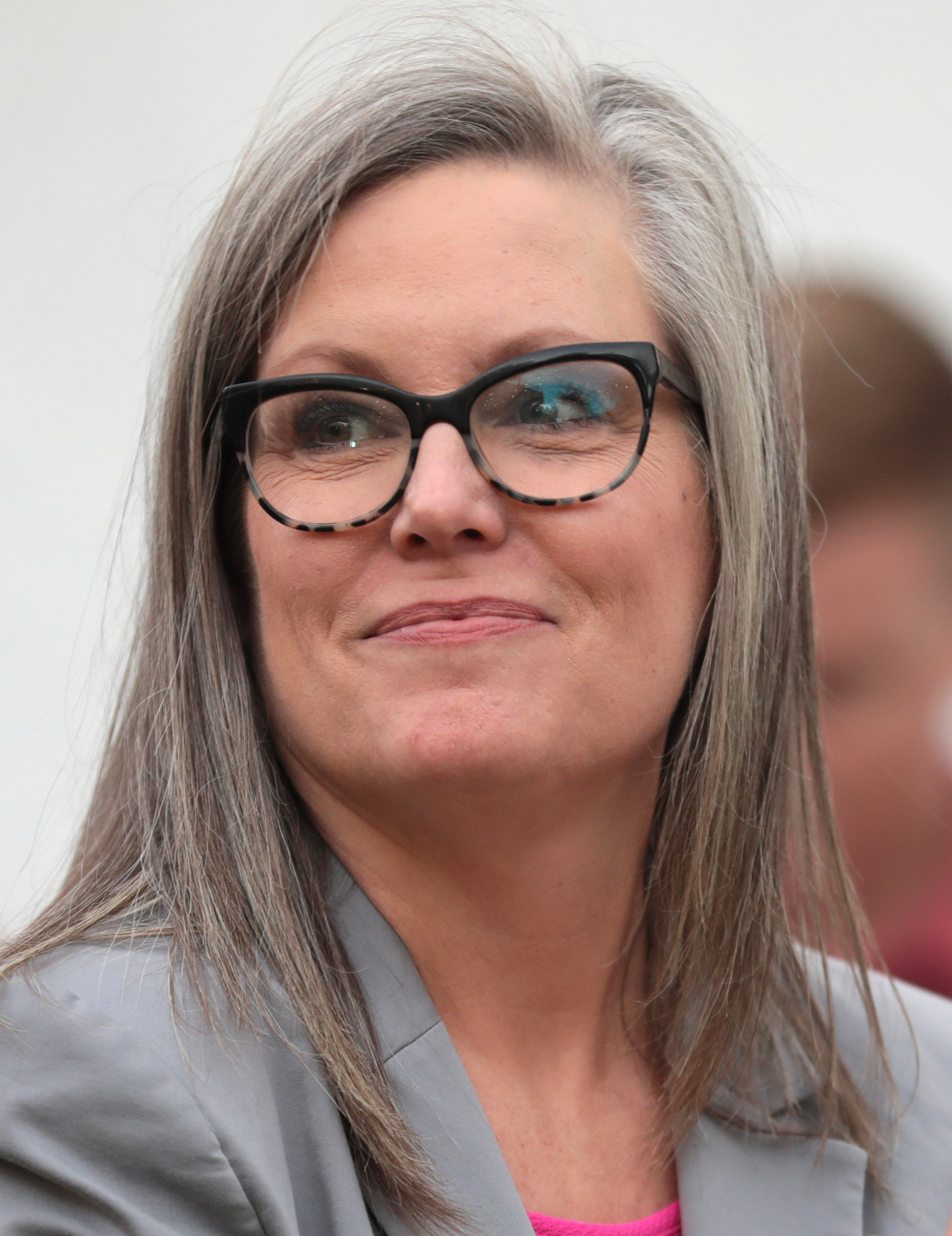
Hobbs in 2022 at a Phoenix event

Hobbs's complaints were echoed in a letter to State Senate President Karen Fann from the Maricopa County Board of Supervisors, which had a 4-1 Republican majority. Fann, referring to one of Donald Trump's false claims of election fraud, contended that the county had deleted an entire database. The board of supervisors responded in a letter, calling the accusations "false, defamatory, and beneath the dignity of the Senate". It accused the Arizona Senate of "conspiracy theories that fuel the fundraising schemes of those pulling your strings". Fann responded that the audit would continue when the Arizona Veterans Memorial Coliseum site was next available.

After consulting with the Department of Homeland Security and the Election Assistance Commission, Hobbs said she was told that it was impossible to know whether the voting machines the county turned over in response to the Senate subpoena had been compromised and that Dominion Voting Systems should recertify them for future use. While the Arizona Senate's contractor was in possession of the machines that had been subpoenaed, the county spent over $20,000 to lease other machines to conduct two local elections, and the costs of recertifying the surrendered machines after their return would be in the six-figure range; however, the Senate signed an agreement with the county that said the county is not liable for any damages to the equipment while in the Senate's custody, so it is unclear whether the county would be liable for the costs.

The audit was conducted by Florida-based company Cyber Ninjas, which had no previous experience in election audits and had not been certified by the federal government to conduct election audits. Cyber Ninjas' owner, Doug Logan, supported Trump and promoted Trump's false claims of election fraud. The auditors released a report in September 2021, finding no proof of fraud and that their ballot recount increased Biden's margin of victory by 360 votes.

== Governor of Arizona (2023-present) ==
=== Elections ===
==== 2022 ====
County results of Hobbs's gubernatorial win in 2022

On June 2, 2021, Hobbs announced her candidacy for governor of Arizona in the 2022 election to succeed term-limited Republican incumbent Doug Ducey.

Hobbs ran against former Customs and Border Protection chief of staff Marco Lopez and former state representative Aaron Lieberman in the Democratic primary. Despite declining to debate her opponents, she won the Democratic nomination with 72.3% of the vote.

Hobbs faced the Republican nominee, former KSAZ-TV news anchor Kari Lake, in the general election. Hobbs limited access to reporters, sometimes going out of her way to avoid them, and held small-scale campaign events. She declined to debate Lake, saying she wanted to deny Lake the opportunity to spread election denialism. Hobbs narrowly defeated Lake with 50.3% of the vote. After the election, Lake refused to concede and assembled a legal team to contest the election results. In March 2023, the Arizona Supreme Court declined to hear Lake's lawsuit concerning the election, and in May reaffirmed its decision after a trial.

==== 2026 ====
County results of Hobbs's gubernatorial win in 2026

On October 8, 2025, Hobbs announced her candidacy for reelection as governor in the 2026 election. On July 21, 2026, Hobbs won the Democratic primary election unopposed.

Hobbs faced Republican nominee Andy Biggs in the general election. It was Arizona's first gubernatorial election in which nominees had to name a lieutenant governor. Hobbs selected the former Republican, now independent John Giles, the former Mayor of Mesa. Biggs selected former State senator Sine Kerr. On November 3, Hobbs defeated Biggs in the general election with 55% of the vote to Biggs's 42%. Her victory was part of a blue wave in the 2026 United States elections.

=== Tenure ===
Hobbs was sworn in on January 2, 2023, in a private ceremony, followed by a public ceremony on January 5. Upon taking office, she became Arizona's fifth female governor, a record for U.S. states. In December 2022, she selected Allie Bones, the Arizona assistant secretary of state, as her chief of staff. Bones resigned on May 25, 2023, and was replaced by Chad Campbell, the former minority leader of the Arizona House of Representatives, on May 31.

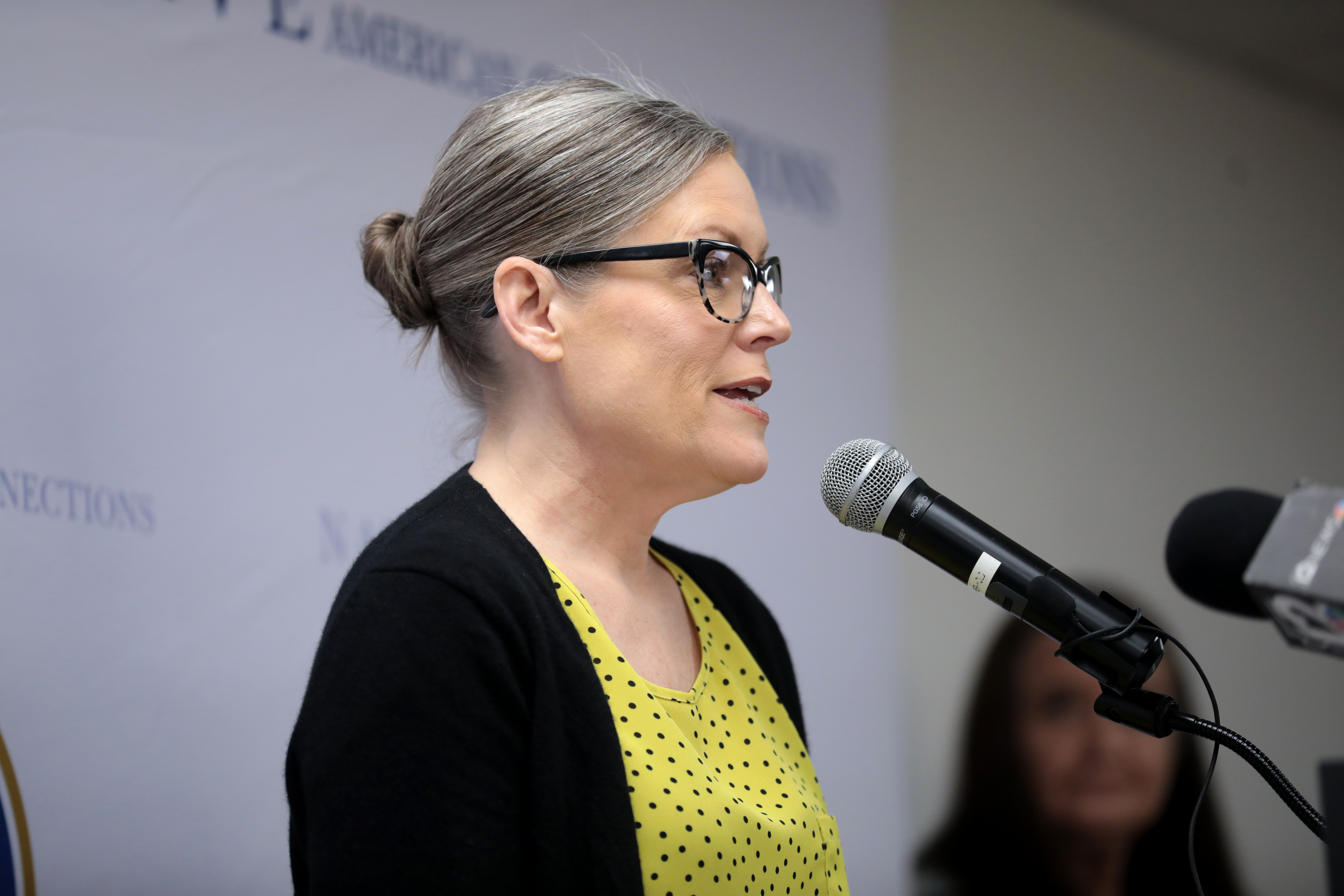
Hobbs speaking at an event in Surprise, Arizona, February 2023

Since taking office, Hobbs has issued numerous executive orders, including those prohibiting state agencies and all new state contracts or subcontracts from discrimination based on traits of sexual orientation or gender identity. Hobbs has established several commissions, including an independent prison oversight commission; a commission on homelessness and housing that was abolished in 2020; a bipartisan elections task force; and a task force on Missing and Murdered Indigenous Women.

In May 2023, the Russian government permanently banned Hobbs from entering Russia. The banning came after the Biden administration imposed further sanctions on Russia; others banned from entering Russia include U.S. Representative Eli Crane and Arizona State University president Michael M. Crow.

In June 2024, Arizona Attorney General Kris Mayes, a Democrat, opened an investigation into Hobbs after a group home business whose CEO was on the governor's inaugural committee donated $400,000 to her campaign through a dark money group. The firm received nearly a 60% rate increase for providing foster care services, making it Arizona's highest-paid provider per day per child. A spokesman for Hobbs blamed partisan politics for the investigation. In March 2026, the Arizona state senate passed legislation intended to provide more transparency about state contractors' contributions to political campaigns in the wake of the scandal.

==== Abortion ====
On May 2, 2024, Hobbs signed a bill to repeal a near-total abortion ban from 1864 that the Arizona Supreme Court reinstated on April 9, 2024. The ban was not enforced by Arizona Attorney General Kris Mayes, and the repeal took effect on September 14, 2024. As a result of 2024 Arizona Proposition 139, the Arizona constitution codifies legal abortion up to the point of fetal viability.

==== Capital punishment ====
An opponent of capital punishment, Hobbs voted for an unsuccessful bill in the state legislature to repeal Arizona's death penalty, and tweeted, "both heinous crimes and the death penalty demean us as a society". As governor, Hobbs has said that her opinion of the death penalty is "irrelevant", and in December 2024, she said she was "not going to talk about" her views on the death penalty, saying that the death penalty is the law in Arizona and that she "is going to follow the law". When Hobbs took office, she halted executions and was ordered to appear alongside Ryan Thornell, Arizona's prison director, in Maricopa County Superior Court, over her refusal to carry out an execution warrant issued by the Arizona Supreme Court. On January 20, 2023, she ordered a review of the state's death penalty protocols, and hired retired magistrate Judge David Duncan to carry it out. Arizona conservatives criticized Hobbs for not cooperating with the court-ordered execution of Aaron Gunches in 2023. After Thornell completed an internal review, Hobbs reversed her executive order that effectively halted executions by ending the review she commissioned Duncan to complete and firing Duncan; shortly thereafter, Attorney General Kris Mayes requested an execution date for Gunches, who was executed on March 19, 2025. This was the first execution conducted in a state with a Democratic governor in office since Virginia executed William Morva under Governor Terry McAuliffe in 2017. On October 17, 2025, Richard Djerf became the second person executed in Arizona during Hobbs's governorship, and the first to have exhausted his appellate rights (Gunches waived most of his appeals). On May 20, 2026, Leroy McGill was executed.

==== Immigration ====
In her 2023 State of the State address, Hobbs proposed expanding the Arizona Promise Scholarship Program to make it available for undocumented immigrant students to attend state universities and colleges.

In May 2023, ahead of the repeal of Title 42, Hobbs announced that the state would establish five new bus routes to transport migrants from small border communities to Tucson.

On December 17, 2023, Hobbs issued an executive order ordering the Arizona National Guard to the border with Mexico to help federal officials manage an influx of migrants.

In 2025, Hobbs vetoed Senate Bill 1164, which would have prevented state agencies and local governments from adopting policies banning cooperation with federal immigration authorities. It would have also required sheriffs and the state prison system to comply with detainer requests from the federal government. Hobbs has argued that immigration enforcement is primarily a federal responsibility, opposing state-level measures that would expand Arizona's role in policing immigration.

==== Housing ====
In March 2024, Hobbs vetoed bipartisan legislation to increase Arizona's housing supply. The bill would have reduced red tape around housing construction by preventing Arizona municipalities from requiring homeowners' associations, minimum home sizes, and certain building setbacks. She said the bill was "a step too far" and had "unclear outcomes". The legislation's sponsors criticized Hobbs for not offering any guidance on the legislation when it was being negotiated, as they could have adjusted the bill's language to make it more in line with her preferences.

==== Medical debt forgiveness ====
In March 2024, Hobbs announced that Arizona would use $30 million of federal COVID-19 relief funds to forgive Arizonans' medical debts. Using the funds from the 2021 American Rescue Plan Act, Arizona will task the RIP Medical Debt organization to buy medical debt held by hospitals and collection agencies. An RIP Medical Debt board member said that up to $2 billion of debt could be forgiven.

==== Veto record ====
On April 18, 2023, her 100th day in office, Hobbs set a new record for the most vetoes issued by an Arizona governor in a single legislative session, with 63 vetoes of bills passed by the Republican-majority legislature. The previous record was set by former governor Janet Napolitano, who vetoed 58 total bills in the 2005 session.

Three of the bills vetoed on April 18 passed with a bipartisan supermajority in both the Arizona House and the Arizona Senate. One of them, concerned with cottage foods and colloquially known as the "tamale bill", became a topic of national conversation after multiple Democratic legislators voiced their opposition to the veto. The bill would have allowed home cooks to sell perishable foods. Although the bill passed with a bipartisan supermajority, a vote to override the veto in the Arizona House of Representatives failed, with only five Democrats voting to override. The other two bills Hobbs vetoed that passed with supermajorities, SB1091 and SB1101, have not been brought forward to an override vote. On May 19, Hobbs vetoed 14 bills passed by the state house and senate, surpassing 100 vetoes in only five months; among them was HB2377, which would have restricted officials from being registered lobbyists while holding public office.

== Personal life ==
Hobbs is married to Patrick Goodman, whom she met at church in 1992 and married in 1996. Goodman is a child therapist at Phoenix Children's Hospital. They have two children and live in Phoenix.

Hobbs is Catholic. She is a triathlete and has been an avid cyclist since high school.

== See also ==
- List of female lieutenant governors in the United States
- List of female governors in the United States
- List of female secretaries of state in the United States

Arizona Senate
Preceded by Anna Tovar	Minority Leader of the Arizona Senate; 2015–2019	Succeeded by David Bradley
Political offices
Preceded by Michele Reagan	Secretary of State of Arizona; 2019–2023	Succeeded by Adrian Fontes
Preceded by Doug Ducey	Governor of Arizona; 2023–present	Incumbent
Party political offices
Preceded by David Garcia	Democratic nominee for Governor of Arizona; 2022, 2026	Most recent
U.S. order of precedence (ceremonial)
Preceded by JD Vance as Vice President	Order of precedence of the United States; Within Arizona	Succeeded by Mayor of city in which event is held
Preceded by JD Vance as Vice President	Order of precedence of the United States; Within Arizona	Succeeded by Otherwise Mike Johnson as Speaker of the House
Preceded by Michelle Lujan Grisham as Governor of New Mexico	Order of precedence of the United States; Outside Arizona	Succeeded by Mike Dunleavy as Governor of Alaska
