= Mesa Arts Center =

Performing and visual arts venue in Mesa, Arizona

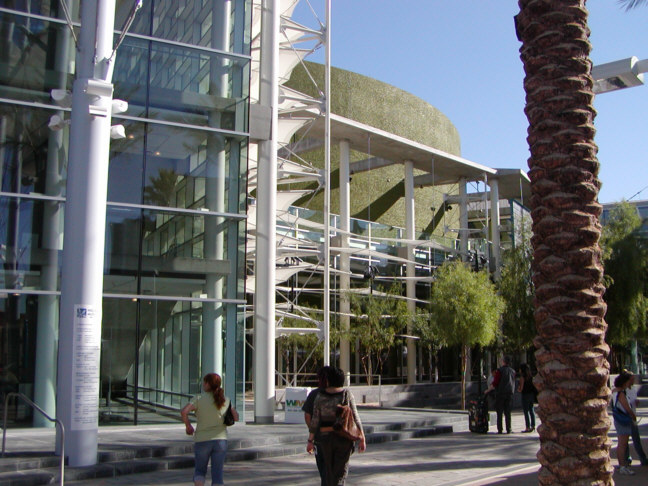
- Interactive map of Mesa Arts Center
- Address: One East Main Street
- Location: Mesa, Arizona
- Coordinates: 33.4140°N 111.8305°W
- Owner: City of Mesa
- Operator: City of Mesa
- Capacity: Ikeda Theater: 1,600; Virginia G Piper Repertory Theater: 550; Nesbitt/Elliott Playhouse: 200; Anita Cox Farnsworth Studio Theater: 99
- Type: Arts Center
- Acreage: 7 acres

Construction
- Groundbreaking: 2002
- Opened: 2005
- Cost: $90,000,000
- Architects: Bora Architects & DWL Architects + Planners Inc.
- General contractor: Layton Construction of Arizona

Tenants
- Ballet Etudes; East Valley Children's Theatre; Mesa Encore Theatre; Metropolitan Youth Symphony; Sonoran Desert Chorale; Southwest Shakespeare Company; Salt River Brass

Website
- www.mesaartscenter.com

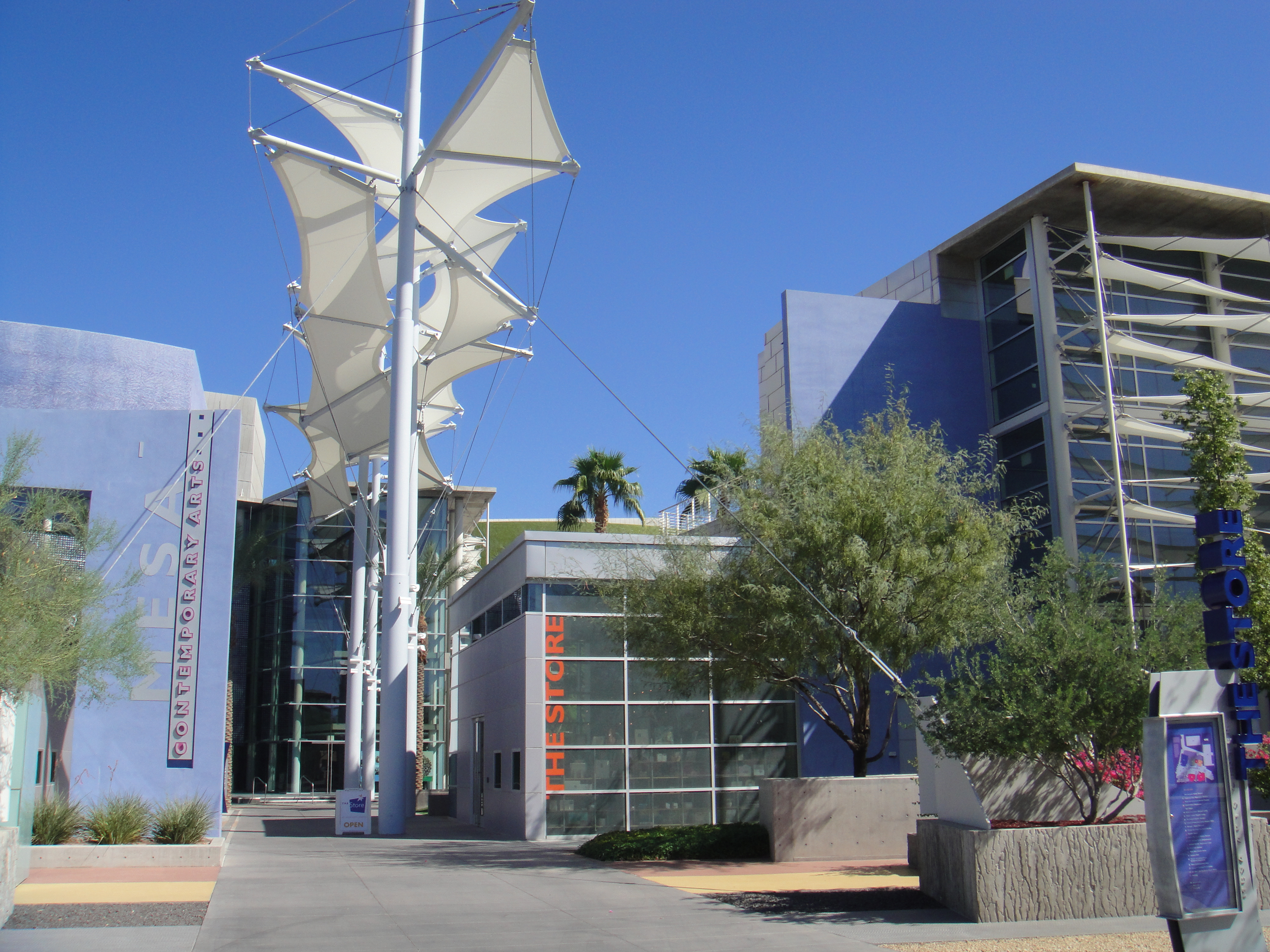
One of the entrance areas

The Mesa Arts Center is a performing and visual arts complex in downtown Mesa, Arizona. At more than 210,000 square feet (20,000 m^{2}) square feet, the $95 million facility, completed in 2005, is the largest comprehensive arts campus in the state.

The Mesa Arts Center encompasses four performance venues, from the intimate 99-seat Farnsworth Studio Theater to the 1,600-seat Ikeda Theater. The center is home to the Mesa Contemporary Arts Museum, which houses five art galleries with 5,500 sq ft (510 m^{2}) of exhibition space. The facility also features 14 visual and performing art classroom studios. Multi-use areas throughout the campus provide both indoor and outdoor gathering and presentation spaces.

== Architecture ==
The architecture of the entire complex is primarily post-modern, with sharp, jagged angles, canted walls, sloping roofs, glass walls, and a reflection of the local vernacular in both colors and materials. The campus is inspired by a geode, and guides pedestrians from the outer concrete walls to a central space of glass, water, and color. This campus has been designed to be reflective of the Sonoran Desert. The complex was designed by Bora Architects of Portland, Oregon in associations with DWL Architects + Planners, of Phoenix, Arizona. Martha Schwartz Inc. served as landscape architect for the project.

The Shadow Walk is a major pathway through the campus that is lined with outdoor gardens, sunken courtyards, performance spaces, water features, stainless steel pergolas, and giant canopies. In addition to the Shadow Walk, public art has been added to the architecture to connect it to the community. This includes "Fragmented Landscapes" by Ned Kahn, "Colorwalk" by Beth Galston, "Light Storm" by Catherine Widgery, and "Memento" by Rebecca Ross.

== History ==
The movement to construct the Mesa Arts Center was championed by Wayne Brown, who served as the Mayor of Mesa from 1996 to 2000. Under Brown, the city passed a quality-of-life bond issue in 1998 to help pay for the center. Though he left office in 2000, Brown and his wife, Kathye, continued a private fundraising campaign for the arts center. The couple ultimately raised more than $4.5 million from the private sector beginning in 2000. The Mesa Arts Center's sculpture courtyard is named for Brown.

The Acting Director of Arts and Culture for the City of Mesa since July 2023 is Illya Riske. Riske had previously been the center's assistant director. Mandy Tripoli is the Executive Director of Mesa Arts Center and has served Mesa Arts Center for the last 13 years. Randall Vogel, CFE, is the Deputy Director of Performing Arts/Theaters. He has been in charge of Theaters and Operations since June 2002.

== Programs ==
The programs are hosted in four buildings on the Mesa Arts Center campus. This includes the four theaters, the Mesa Contemporary Arts Museum, and 14 art studios.

- Performing Live
  - Professional touring engagements perform at the Mesa Arts Center; this includes Broadway, classical music, popular music, ethnic artists, western artists, dance, National Geographic Live speaker series, and family entertainment.
