= Mesa High School (Mesa, Arizona) =

Location
- 1630 East Southern Avenue; Mesa, Arizona 85204-5220; United States; 33.396323°N 111.794642°W

Information
- Type: Public secondary (U.S.)
- Motto: Carry On
- Established: 1898
- School district: Mesa Unified School District
- NCES District ID: 0404970
- NCES School ID: 040497000404
- Principal: Kirk Thomas
- Teaching staff: 166.20 (FTE)
- Grades: 9–12
- Enrollment: 3,442 (2023-2024)
- Student to teacher ratio: 20.71
- Campus: Suburban
- Colors: Purple & Gold
- Mascot: Jackrabbit
- Newspaper: The Jackrabbit
- Yearbook: Superstition
- Website: mesa.mpsaz.org

Mesa High School is a public high school in Mesa, Arizona, United States. Mesa High School currently accommodates grades 9–12 as part of Mesa Public Schools. Mesa High School is the oldest high school in Mesa, Arizona, and is home of the Jackrabbits. Mesa High has more than 3,200 students and boasts award-winning athletics, music, theatre programs and more.

== History ==
In early 1898, citizens in the Mesa area petitioned for and voted to establish a high school district. Its first classes began in September 1899 on the second floor of the red brick north elementary school, later rebuilt and known as Irving School.

On December 26, 1907, the high school district in Mesa was reorganized into the Mesa Union High School District. The Town Council had leased all of Block 20 to the University of Arizona for 99 years to use as an experimental farm. This was the land bounded by Center St and MacDonald, Second and Third Avenues. It didn't take long to discover that the block was not large enough. On January 4, 1908, they sold it to the school district for $75. Construction began immediately on the building known as "Old Main". The class of 1909 graduated from that original twelve room building. The school had a main floor auditorium with a swimming pool in the basement. The auditorium was used for assemblies, with folding chairs for the early comers and standing room only for the rest. Ten years later, eight more rooms were added plus a small auditorium-gymnasium. During basketball games, spectators sat in the balcony (above the freshman section) or on the stage because the gym was not wide enough for sideline bleachers.

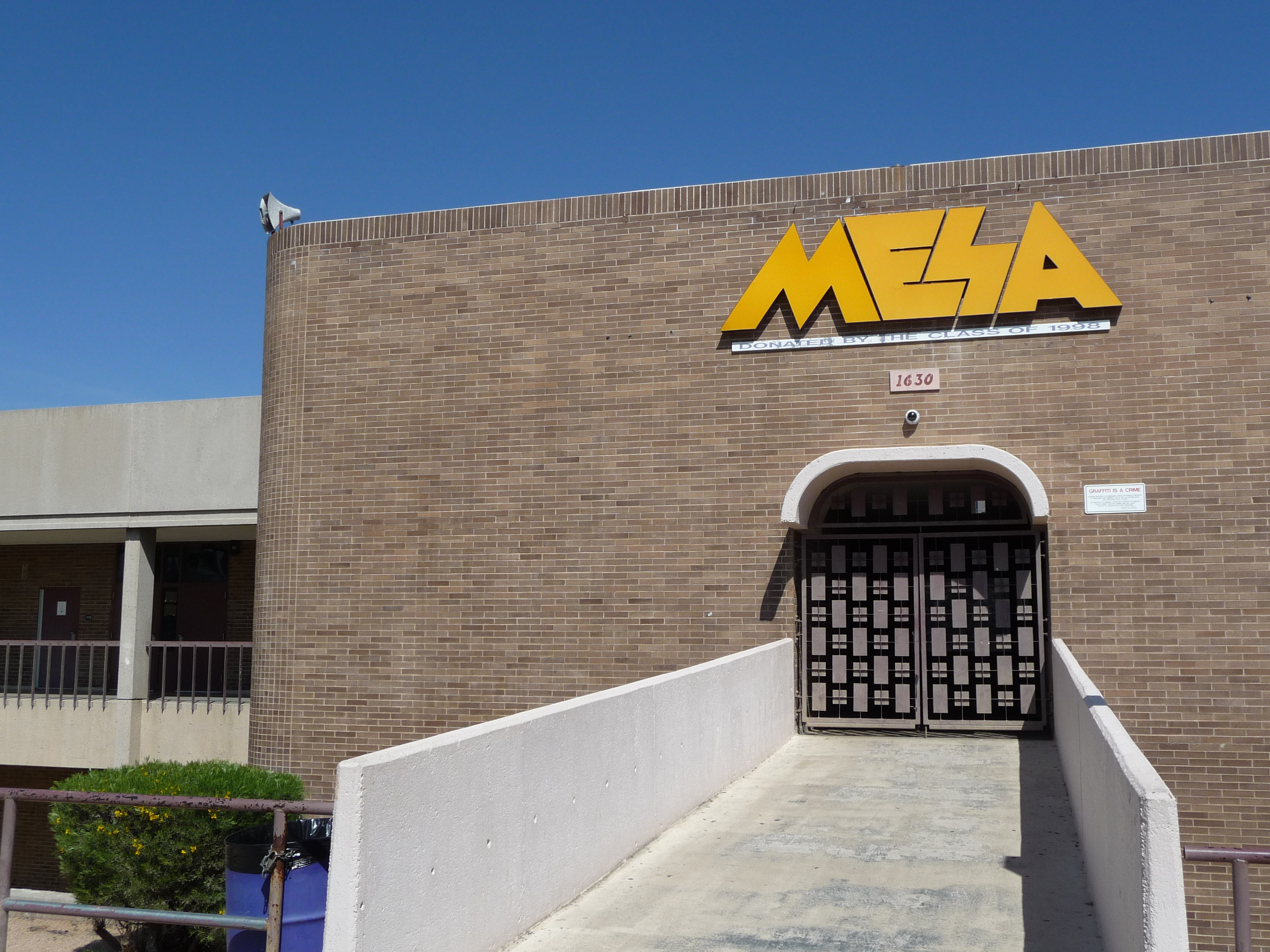
Entrance to the school, adorned by a sign donated by the Class of 1998

In September 1932, a football player, named Zedo Ishikawa, was accidentally killed with a shotgun blast to the chest while attempting to break up a fight between two dogs. As he neared death he said, "Tell Coach Coutchie and the boys to carry on." As time went on, students began repeating the theme "Carry On" to one another. Eventually, it became the school's official motto.

In 1936, the WPA and PWA provided funds for new construction, and the New Building was constructed west of the Main Building with an arcade in between. The land for this was purchased from Harvey Bush, for $4,000. A new gymnasium building, which included an agriculture shop and auto shop, was also built south of the Main Building — the new site for school dances and basketball games.

In 1967, Mesa won their homecoming football game against rival Westwood High. Then, on Sunday night, October 1, 1967, a disastrous fire started in the science lab, completely destroying the sixty-year-old "Old Main." Classes continued to graduate from the old campus until 1972 when the new Mesa High was built, at a different location (farther east and south). The original Mesa High campus, minus the destroyed Old Main, would be reused in the 1970s as Mesa Central High School, which became the district's vocational school in the 1980s and closed in 1991.

In summer 2015, an aquatic center was added to the campus; it was run by the City of Mesa.

In 2016, the boys basketball team won state championship for Division 1, ending their 12-year championship drought.

== Academics ==
In the 1983–84 school year, it was honored as a Blue Ribbon school.

AIMS test scores for MHS were below the state average in reading, math, and writing for 2002 through 2004, but they improved to substantially above average for 2005.

== Athletics ==
The school won the 5A state championships in 2004 for boys basketball, and three straight 5A-I titles in wrestling from 2006 to 2008. Anthony Robles, who was born without a right leg, won individual state championships in 2005 and 2006. He later went on to win the 2006 Senior Nationals' and wrestled at Arizona State University on a full scholarship. Robles finished fourth at the 2009 NCAA Division I Championships at 125 pounds, seventh at the 2010 tournament, and was national champion in 2011. Home to the Ordaz brothers; Mayk (160) and John Ordaz (130). The only two-time state champion siblings that both recorded undefeated seasons; twice in their high school career, (2009–2012), on the top ten wrestler list from Arizona.

State Champions
| Sport | Years |
|---|---|
| Baseball (5) | 1927, 1947, 1953, 1957, 1958 |
| Boys Basketball (14) | 1917, 1918, 1923, 1924, 1925, 1926, 1933, 1936, 1946, 1950, 1951, 1988, 2004, 2016 |
| Football (11)* | 1928, 1933, 1946, 1947, 1950, 1956, 1958, 1960, 1963, 1990, 1992 |
| Boys Golf (2) | 1957, 1979 |
| Boys Soccer (1)* | 1981 |
| Softball (1) | 1988 |
| Boys Tennis (4) | 1937, 1950, 1951, 1952 |
| Boys Track & Field (5) | 1950, 1952, 1962, 1982, 1988 |
| Wrestling (4) | 1977, 2006, 2007, 2008 |

State Runners-Up
| Sport | Years |
|---|---|
| Baseball (5) | 1914, 1928, 1945, 1950, 1959 |
| Boys Basketball (3) | 1944, 1952, 1953, 2025 |
| Girls Basketball (1) | 1987 |
| Girls Cross Country (1) | 1988 |
| Football (16)* | 1924, 1925, 1926, 1930, 1935, 1937, 1939, 1940, 1941, 1944, 1952, 1953, 1954, 1957, 1979, 2009 |
| Boys Tennis (2) | 1948, 1957 |
| Girls Tennis (6) | 1945, 1949, 1950, 1951, 1953, 1955 |
| Boys Track & Field (8) | 1926, 1936, 1945, 1956, 1972, 1984, 1985, 1989 |
| Boys Volleyball (1) | 2014 |
| Wrestling (5) | 1983, 1988, 1991, 2009, 2010 |

*The Arizona Interscholastic Association recognized these sports and the regular season games thereof as official during these years but did not conduct playoffs to determine AIA state champions for them until 1959 for football and 1983 for soccer. In such times, the press declared state champions (and state runners-up), similar to how the Associated Press independently crowns national champions for some sports at the college level.

== Performing Arts ==
Mesa High School has won many Marching Band titles.

== Demographics ==
During the 2023-2024 school year, the demographic break of the 3,442 students enrolled was:

- Male - 50.6%
- Female - 49.4%
- American Indian/Alaska Native - 2.0%
- Asian - 0.5%
- Black - 4.2%
- Hispanic - 68.7%
- Native Hawaiian/Pacific Islander - 0.8%
- White - 21.4%
- Multiracial - 2.4%

== Feeder schools ==
Junior high schools that feed into Mesa High School (and the elementary schools that feed into the junior high schools):

(Note: Some elementary schools feed into more than one junior high)

Kino Junior High School:

- Thomas Edison Elementary School
- Dwight D. Eisenhower Center for Innovation
- Oliver Wendell Holmes Elementary School
- John Kerr Elementary School
- Lehi Elementary School
- Abraham Lincoln Elementary School
- James Lowell Elementary School

Charles D. Poston Junior High School:

- Marjorie Entz Elementary School
- Eugene Field Elementary
- Nathan Hale Elementary School
- Michael Hughes Elementary
- Highland Arts Elementary School
- Henry Longfellow Elementary School

Harvey L. Taylor Junior High School

- Washington Irving Elementary School
- Veora Johnson Elementary School
- Helen Keller Elementary School
- Ann Morrow LIndbergh Elementary School
- James Madison Elementary School
- William S. Porter Elementary School
- Charles I. Robson Elementary School
- Marilyn Wilson Elementary School

== Notable alumni ==
- Jeremy Accardo – MLB Baltimore Orioles
- Wayne Brown – Mayor of Mesa from 1996 to 2000
- Jahii Carson – professional basketball player
- Jim Carter – NCAA golf champion and PGA Tour
- Lee Cummard – NBA D-League Utah Flash
- Kyler Fackrell – NFL Green Bay Packers
- Aaron Fuller - NCAA Iowa/USC & professional basketball
- Jeff Groscost – Arizona House Speaker
- Mickey Hatcher – MLB player, 2-time World Series champion
- Robert Holcombe – NFL St. Louis Rams, Super Bowl champion
- Don Janicki — Marathon runner
- Keelan Johnson - NCAA football ASU & NFL Philadelphia Eagles
- Mirriam Johnson AKA Jessi Colter – recording artist
- Jack Lind – MLB Milwaukee Brewers
- Andy Livingston – NFL Pro Bowl selection
- Warren Livingston – NFL Dallas Cowboys
- Deuce Lutui – NCAA football champion, NFL Arizona Cardinals
- Mike MacDougal – MLB All-Star
- Orlando McKay – NFL wide receiver
- Phil Ortega – MLB Washington Senators
- Rudy Owens - MLB Houston Astros
- Anthony Robles – NCAA wrestling champion, ESPY winner
- Matt Salmon – US Congressman
- Vai Sikahema – NCAA football champion, 2-time NFL Pro Bowler
- Robert Smith – Perpetrator of the 1966 Rose-Mar College of Beauty shooting
- Delbert Stapley – LDS Apostle
- Wilford "Whizzer" White – ASU football legend, NFL player
- Patsy Willard – US Olympic diving bronze medalist
- Yuridia – diamond-certified recording artist
