= Wayne Brown (American politician) =

American politician (1936–2013)

Mayor of Mesa, Arizona
- In office 1996–2000
- Preceded by: Willie Wong
- Succeeded by: Keno Hawker

Personal details
- Born: November 16, 1936 Mesa, Arizona
- Died: May 14, 2013 (aged 76) Arizona
- Spouse: Kathye Brown
- Children: Elizabeth; Kent; Marty
- Profession: Politician, Accountant

Wayne Brown (November 16, 1936 – May 14, 2013) was an American politician and accountant. Brown served for two, two-year terms as the Mayor of Mesa, Arizona from 1996 to 2000. He spearheaded the movement to building the Mesa Arts Center in downtown Mesa, now the largest performing arts campus in Arizona.

== Biography ==
=== Early life ===
Brown was born on November 16, 1936, in Mesa, Arizona. He had a twin brother. Brown graduated from Mesa High School and received a bachelor's degree in accounting from Arizona State University.

=== Career ===
Brown served on the Mesa City Council from 1968 to 1976. Former Mesa Mayor Wayne Pomeroy, who served as mayor during the late 1970s, has credited Brown for planning the old Hohokam Park, beginning in 1976, during Brown's last year in office. The stadium was used for training by the Oakland As in 1977 and 1978. The Chicago Cubs moved their spring training camp from Scottsdale to Hohokam Park in Mesa in 1979.

Wayne founded Wayne Brown & Co., a Mesa-based certified public accounting (CPA) firm. He and his wife later acquired the Evans Distribution Co., a fuel distribution company, during the 1980s. He served as the company's CEO.

=== Mayor of Mesa ===
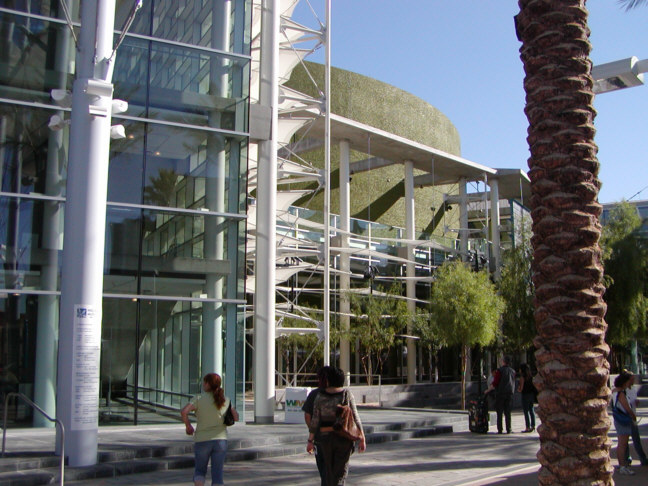
The Mesa Arts Center.

Brown served as Mayor of Mesa for two consecutive, two-year terms from 1996 to 2000. He was a supporter of historic preservation and the conservation of the Sonoran Desert from urban sprawl. He also persuaded former Mayor Wayne Pomeroy to return to city council to fill the vacancy of a departing councilman.

During his tenure as mayor, Brown championed the movement to construct the Mesa Arts Center in downtown Mesa. Under Brown, the city passed a quality-of-life bond issue, which was approved by voters in 1998, to pay for the center. Though he left office in 2000, Brown and his wife, Kathye, continued a private fundraising campaign for the arts center. The couple initially hoped to raise $3.5 million, but ultimately raised more than $4.5 million from the private sector. The Mesa Arts Center opened in 2005, five years after Brown left office. The center's Brown Sculpture Courtyard is named in his honor.

Brown described his time as mayor as more stressful than he had anticipated. He suffered from a health scare while in office. In an interview after leaving city government, Brown states that "I burned myself out quicker than I thought...If I had to do it again, I would have slowed down."

Wayne Brown died following a long series of strokes on May 14, 2013, at the age of 76. He was survived by his wife, Kathye; his mother, Elva; three children – Elizabeth, Kent and Marty; thirteen grandchildren; his twin brother and his younger brother.
