= Mark Freeman (politician) =

American politician from Arizona

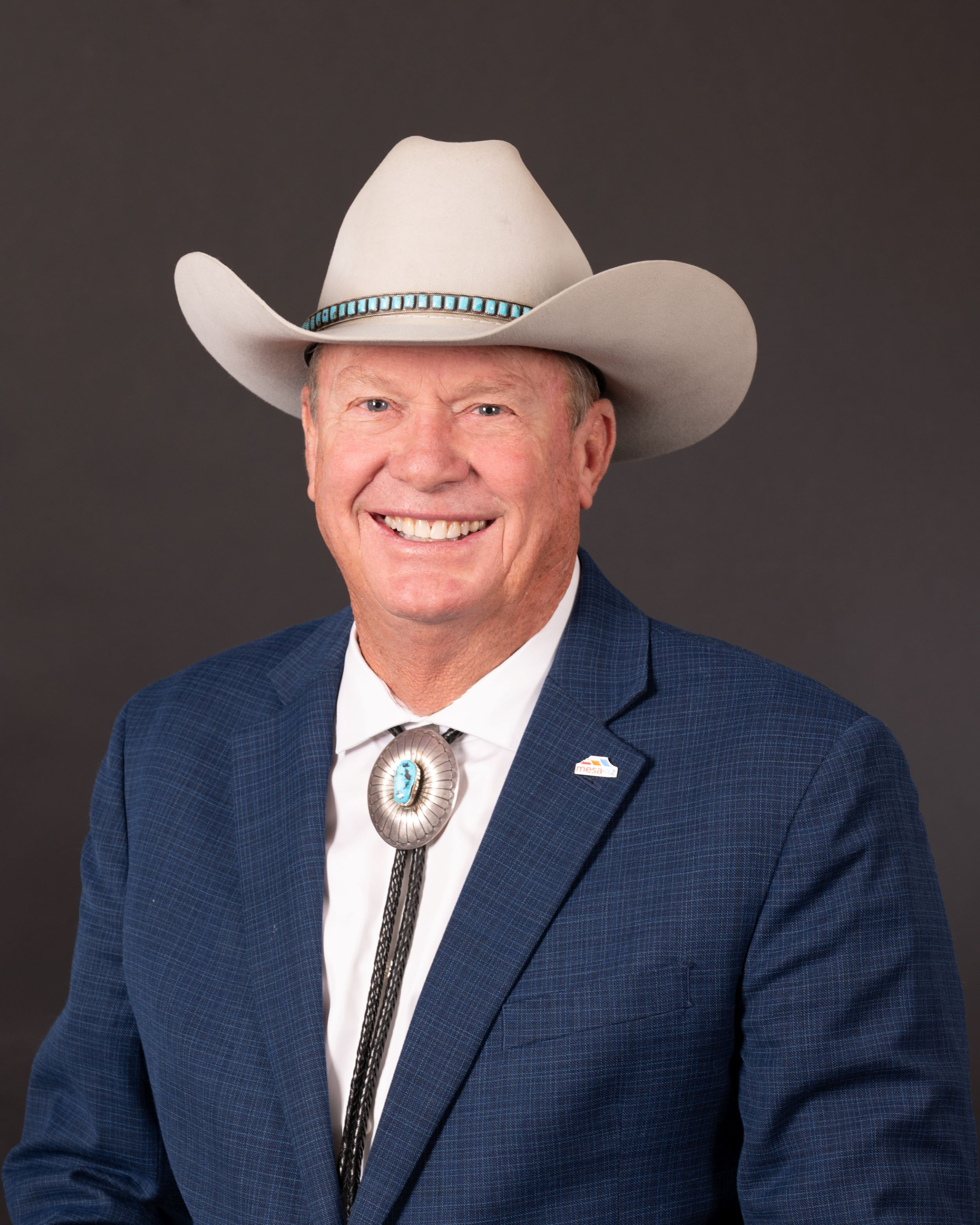
- Official portrait, 2025

Mayor of Mesa
- Incumbent
- Assumed office January 7, 2025
- Preceded by: John Giles

Personal details
- Party: Republican
- Website: Campaign website Government website

Mark A. Freeman is an American politician currently serving as the 41st Mayor of Mesa, Arizona. Mark previously represented District 1 on the Mesa City Council from 2017 to 2024 and was Vice Mayor from 2019 to 2021.

In the 2024 Mesa mayoral election, Freeman was elected as a non-partisan candidate, defeating former mayor Scott Smith.

== Personal life ==
Freeman worked as a fireman for 31 years in the Mesa Fire and Medical Department until his retirement in 2011, and is also a small business owner. He and his wife LeeAnn operate the Freeman Corn Patch.

Freeman is a descendant of Mormon pioneer Charles Crismon, one of the founding fathers of Mesa.

Political offices
| Preceded by John Giles | Mayor of Mesa; 2025–present | Incumbent |
