= Keelan Johnson =

American football player (born 1989)

No. 38
- Position: Cornerback

Personal information
- Born: September 26, 1989 (age 37); Mesa, Arizona, U.S.
- Listed height: 6 ft 0 in (1.83 m)
- Listed weight: 200 lb (91 kg)

Career information
- High school: Mesa
- College: Arizona State
- NFL draft: 2013: undrafted

Career history
- Miami Dolphins (2013)*; Philadelphia Eagles (2013); Dallas Cowboys (2015)*; Seattle Seahawks (2015)*; Ottawa Redblacks (2016–2017); BC Lions (2018)
- * Offseason or practice squad member only

Awards and highlights
- Grey Cup champion (2016)

Career NFL statistics
- Total tackles: 1
- Stats at Pro Football Reference
- Stats at CFL.ca

Keelan Johnson (born September 26, 1989) is an American former professional football player who was a cornerback in the National Football League (NFL) and Canadian Football League (CFL). He played college football for the Arizona State Sun Devils. He signed with the Miami Dolphins as an undrafted free agent in 2013. He also played for the Philadelphia Eagles and Ottawa Redblacks.

== Professional career ==
Pre-draft measurables
Height	Weight	Arm length	Hand span	Wingspan	40-yard dash	10-yard split	20-yard split	20-yard shuttle	Three-cone drill	Vertical jump	Broad jump	Bench press
5 ft 11 5/8 in (1.82 m)	209 lb (95 kg)	32 1/2 in (0.83 m)	9 in (0.23 m)	6 ft 5 1/4 in (1.96 m)	4.41 s	1.56 s	2.64 s	4.07 s	6.77 s	36.5 in (0.93 m)	10 ft 5 in (3.18 m)	12 reps
All values from NFL Combine/Pro Day

=== Miami Dolphins ===
On April 27, 2013, he signed with the Miami Dolphins as an undrafted free agent.

=== Philadelphia Eagles ===
He was signed on the Philadelphia Eagles's practice squad on September 2, 2013, after being waived by the Dolphins. Johnson was added to the Eagles active roster on December 17, 2013. He was released by the Eagles on August 30, 2014.

=== Dallas Cowboys ===
On January 23, 2015, Johnson was signed by the Dallas Cowboys. On July 2, 2015, he was released by the Cowboys.

=== Seattle Seahawks ===
On August 17, 2015, Johnson was signed by the Seattle Seahawks. On August 31, 2015, he was released by the Seahawks.

=== Ottawa Redblacks ===
Johnson signed with the Ottawa Redblacks in 2016.

=== BC Lions ===
Johnson signed with the BC Lions on February 15, 2018. He was released on July 12, 2018, before playing any games for the Lions.
