= Don Strauch =

American politician (1926–2016)

Mayor of Mesa, Arizona
- In office 1980–1984
- Preceded by: Wayne C. Pomeroy
- Succeeded by: Sumner "Al" Brooks

Personal details
- Born: Donald William Strauch Jr. April 8, 1926 Clermont, Iowa, U.S.
- Died: January 11, 2016 (aged 89) Scottsdale, Arizona, U.S.
- Party: Republican

Donald William Strauch Jr. (April 8, 1926 – January 11, 2016), known as Don Strauch, was an American politician. He served as mayor of Mesa, Arizona, from 1980 to 1984. He had previously served on the Mesa City Council since 1972.

Born in Iowa and raised in Arizona, Don was the only son and eldest child of three siblings born to Donald W. Strauch, Sr. and Mary Strauch. He served in World War II with the United States Army. After the war, Strauch attended Babson College, Phoenix College, and Arizona State University.

Strauch was the president of Strauchs' Stationers, Inc. He served as a Republican in the Arizona House of Representatives for district 29 in Mesa until his defeat in 1988 in a primary. Strauch died in Scottsdale, Arizona, from complication from a fall on January 11, 2016, at the age of 89. He was survived by his wife, daughter and extended family.
