= Westwood High School (Mesa, Arizona) =

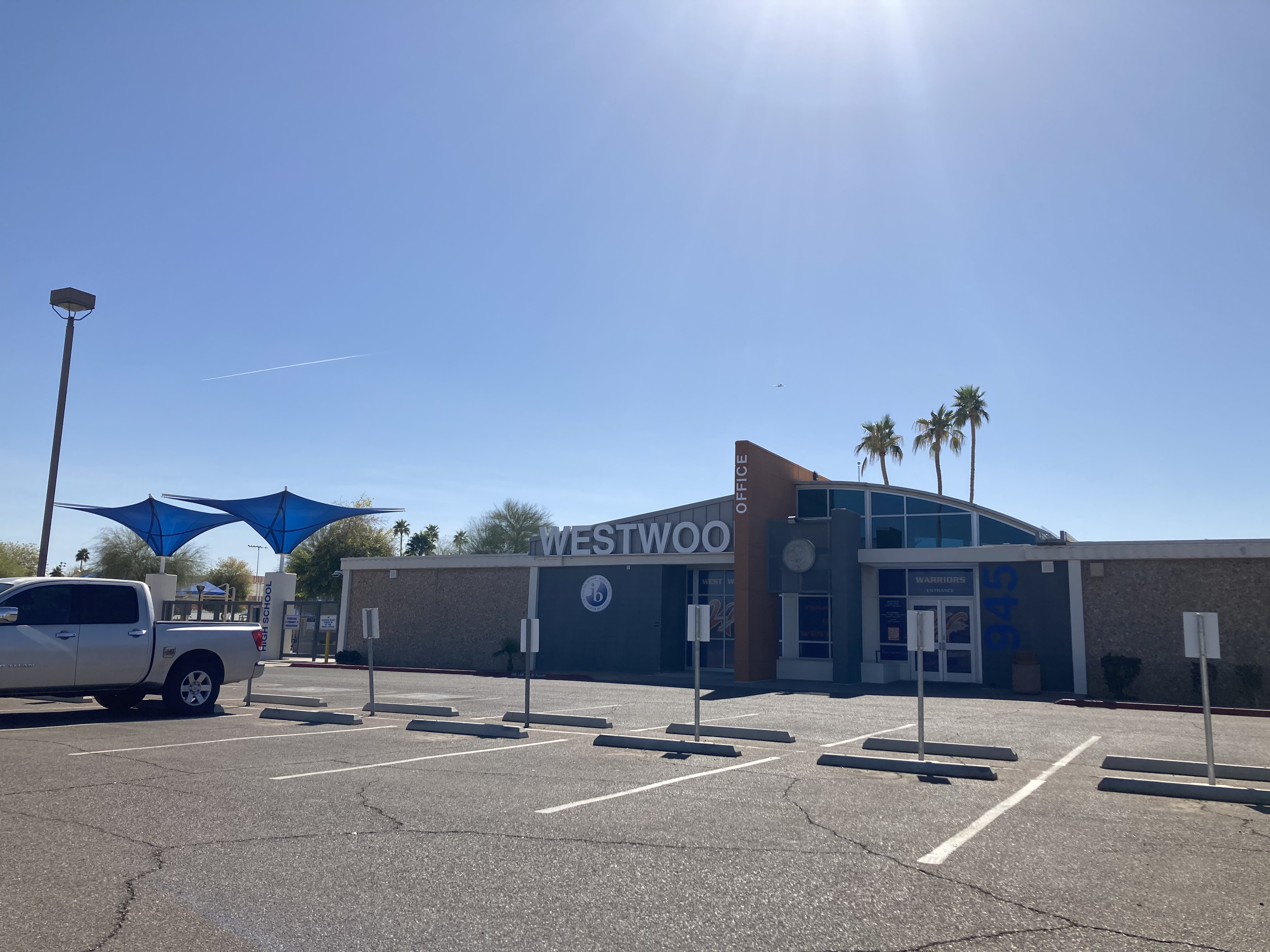
- The main entrance of Westwood High School

Location
- 945 West Rio Salado Parkway; Mesa, Arizona 85201; United States; 33°25′43″N 111°51′1″W

Information
- Type: Public high school
- Established: 1962
- School district: Mesa Public Schools
- NCES District ID: 0404970
- NCES School ID: 040497000419
- Principal: Chris Gilmore
- Teaching staff: 173.50 (FTE)
- Grades: 9–12
- Enrollment: 3,397 (2023–2024)
- Student to teacher ratio: 19.58
- Colors: Orange and blue
- Nickname: Warriors
- Rival: Mesa High School
- Website: www.mpsaz.org/westwood

Westwood High School is a 4-year public high school in the western part of Mesa, Arizona, United States under the jurisdiction of Mesa Public Schools. It was opened in 1962 with Elias Brimhall as the founding principal. In the 1983–84 school year, it was honored as a Blue Ribbon school. In 2018 it was reclassified as a "A" school through the Arizona Department of Education school accountability system.

It is the zoned public high school of the Salt River Pima–Maricopa Indian Community.

== Demographics ==
2023–2024 school year demographics for the 3,397 enrolled students:

- Male – 50.8%
- Female – 49.2%
- American Indian/Alaska Native - 10.5%
- Asian - 0.6%
- Black - 5.7%
- Hispanic - 58.6%
- Native Hawaiian/Pacific Islander - 1.3%
- White - 20.2%
- Multiracial - 3.1%

== Athletics ==
Offered Athletics:

- Badminton
- Cross Country
- Football
- Pom & Cheer
- B/G Golf
- Swim & Dive
- B/G Volleyball
- B/G Basketball
- B/G Soccer
- Wrestling
- E-Sports
- Baseball
- Softball
- Track & Field
- B/G Tennis

== Feeder schools ==
Junior high schools that feed into Westwood High School (and the elementary schools that feed into the junior high schools):

(Note: Some elementary schools feed into more than one junior high)

=== Carson Junior High ===
- Adams Elementary School
- Edison Elementary School
- Eisenhower Center for Innovation
- Emerson Elementary School
- Ralph Waldo Emerson Elementary School
- Lehi Elementary School
- Roosevelt Elementary School
- Webster Elementary School
- Whitman Elementary School
- Whittier Elementary School

=== Kino Junior High ===
- Eisenhower Center for Innovation
- Lehi Elementary School
- Edison Elementary School
- Holmes Elementary School
- Kerr Elementary School
- Lincoln Elementary School
- Lowell Elementary School

=== Rhodes Junior High ===
- Crismon Elementary School
- Pedro Guerrero Elementary School
- Lincoln Elementary School
- Redbird Elementary School
- Roosevelt Elementary School
- Summit Academy (IB)

=== Stapley Junior High ===
- Barbara Bush Elementary School
- Marjorie Entz Elementary School
- Nathan Hale Elementary School
- Hermosa Vista Elementary School
- Zedo Ishikawa Elementary School
- Lehi Elementary School
- Douglas MacArthur Elementary School

== Notable alumni ==
Individuals

- Randy Bennett, basketball head coach at St. Mary's College
- Rick Burch, bassist of Jimmy Eat World
- Siaha Burley, wide receiver in Arena Football League
- John Giles, mayor of Mesa (2014 - 2025)
- Troy Kotsur, actor
- Tom Linton, guitarist of Jimmy Eat World
- Albie Lopez, former MLB player (Cleveland Indians, Tampa Bay Rays, Arizona Diamondbacks, Atlanta Braves, Kansas City Royals)
- Alex Madrid, former MLB player (Milwaukee Brewers, Philadelphia Phillies)
- Ritchie McKay, basketball head coach at Liberty University
- Larry Owens, NBA basketball player with Washington Wizards
- Scott Smith, mayor of Mesa (2008 - 2014)
- Danny White, coach in Arena Football League, former quarterback for Dallas Cowboys

Groups

- Founding members of Authority Zero, a punk rock band
