= Lieutenant Governor of Arizona =

Future political office in Arizona

- Great Seal of the State of Arizona

- Flag of Arizona
- Style: The Honorable
- Residence: None official
- Appointer: Direct election
- Term length: Four years
- Formation: January 4, 2027
- First holder: John Giles (elect)
- Succession: First
- Salary: $165,000 (2026)

The lieutenant governor of Arizona is an elected office in the U.S. state of Arizona. The office will be established on January 4, 2027 following the 2026 Arizona gubernatorial election, which was decided with the passage of Proposition 131 in the 2022 election. On November 3, 2026, John Giles was elected to become the first lieutenant governor.

== History ==
The constitution of Arizona did not originally specify an office of lieutenant governor, making Arizona one of five states with this distinction. The constitution instead specified that the secretary of state, if holding office by election, would assume the office of governor in case of a vacancy in the office. Since 1912, there have been six instances in which this happened, although after the death of Wesley Bolin in 1978, Bruce Babbitt ascended to the post while serving as attorney general, as Rose Mofford had only been appointed secretary of state by Bolin five months earlier.

In 1994, Arizona voters rejected the legislatively referred Proposition 100, which would have created the office of lieutenant governor to be elected on a joint ticket with the governor, with 65.3% of voters being against the measure. In 2010, Proposition 111, a similar legislatively referred measure, failed with 59.2% of voters being against the measure. In 2022 Arizona voters approved the legislatively referred Proposition 131 establishing the position, with 55.16% voting for the amendment and 44.84% voting against it.

On November 3, 2026 former Mesa mayor John Giles was elected as Arizona’s first lieutenant governor along with Governor Katie Hobbs.

== Powers and duties ==
The power of the lieutenant governor of Arizona derives from Article V, Section 1, of the Arizona Constitution, which provides that the lieutenant governor will be the first in line to succeed the governor when the governor dies, resigns, or is removed from office by impeachment & conviction, a role presently filled by the elected Secretary of State. Section 9 provides that the state legislature may prescribe further duties for the lieutenant governor. The proposition—through a law pre-passed by the Legislature—will also task the governor with assigning a job to their running mate, such as chief of staff, the director of the state Department of Administration, or "any position" to which the governor can appoint someone by law.

In the event the office of lieutenant governor becomes vacant, the governor appoints a new person to serve in the position subject to majority approval of both houses of the state legislature.

== List of lieutenant governors of Arizona ==
Lieutenant governors of the State of Arizona
No.	Lieutenant Governor	Term in office	Party	Election	Governor
1	John Giles (born 1960)	Elect (Takes office January 4, 2027)	Independent	2026	Katie Hobbs

== See also ==
- List of governors of Arizona
