= Scott Smith (Arizona politician) =

American politician (born 1956)

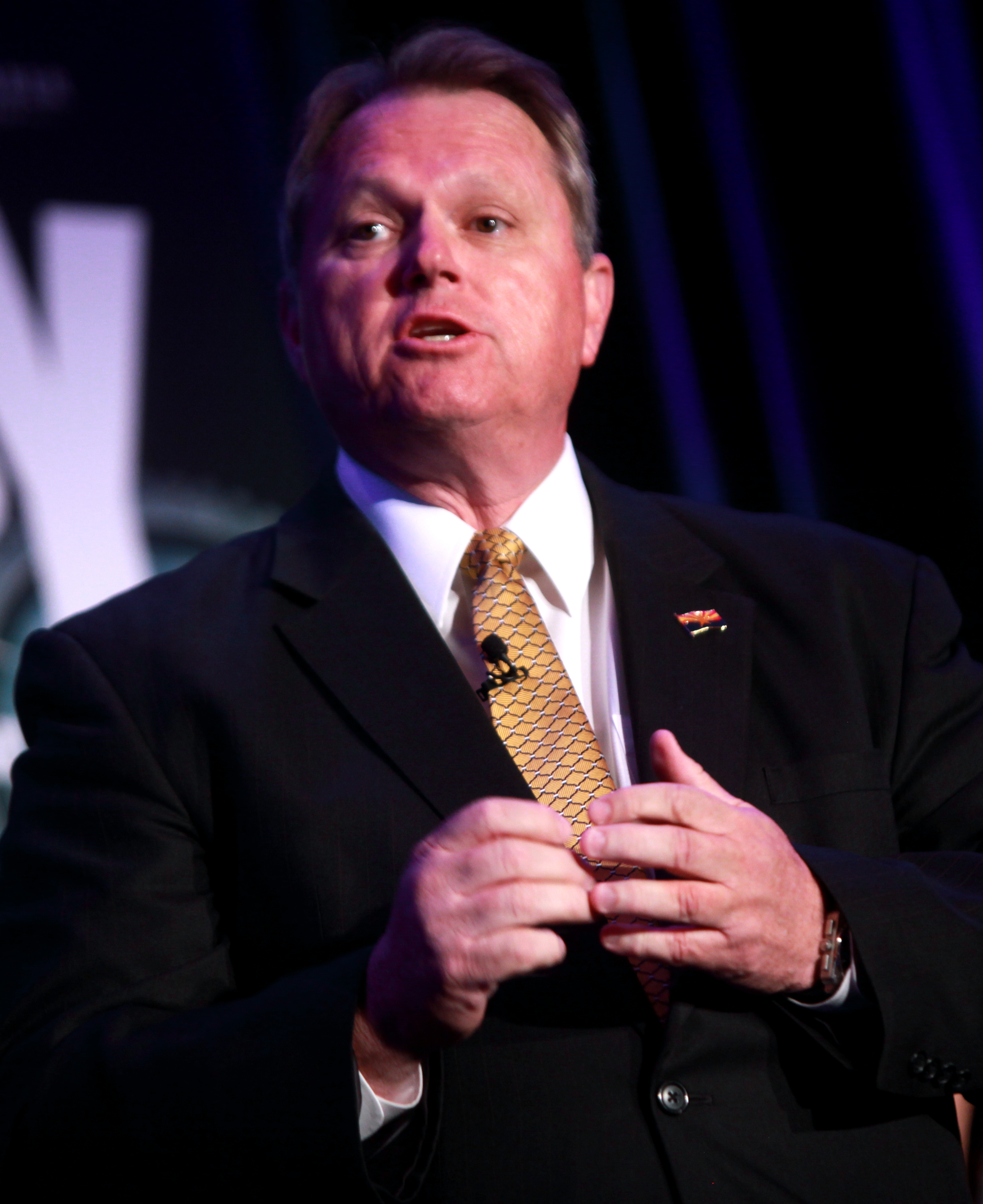

39th Mayor of Mesa
- In office June 2, 2008 – April 16, 2014
- Preceded by: Keno Hawker
- Succeeded by: John Giles (Note: Alex Finter served as the acting Mayor of Mesa from Smith’s resignation until John Giles took office)

71st President of the United States Conference of Mayors
- In office January 1, 2013 – April 16, 2014
- Preceded by: Michael Nutter
- Succeeded by: Kevin Johnson

Personal details
- Born: 1956 (age 69–70) Tucson, Arizona, U.S.
- Party: Republican
- Spouse: Kim Smith
- Children: 3
- Education: Brigham Young University (BS); Arizona State University (MBA, JD)

Scott Smith (born 1956) is an American businessman and politician, elected as the 38th mayor of Mesa, Arizona, on May 20, 2008. He took office on June 2, 2008 and served until April 16, 2014, when he resigned to run for Governor of Arizona in the Republican Primary. In 2013–14, he was president of the United States Conference of Mayors. He was previously president of both Great Western Homes and K. Hovnanian Homes. He has also worked in finance and as a business consultant.

== Early life and education ==
Born in 1956, Smith spent his early childhood in Tucson, Arizona. In 1967, Smith moved with his family to Mesa, after his father assumed the role of superintendent of Mesa Public Schools. Smith was a star basketball player at Westwood High School and graduated in 1974. Smith is a member of the Church of Jesus Christ of Latter-day Saints. and obtained his a B.S. degree in accounting in Brigham Young University Marriott School of Management in 1980.

Smith subsequently attended Arizona State University where he obtained an MBA in 1985. In 1996, Smith received his Juris Doctor degree from the Arizona State University College of Law.

== Career ==
Prior to his time in office, Smith held various professional positions. Between 1988 and 1993 he was an accounting and finance instructor at the University of Phoenix. He held leadership roles in home building companies: from 1994 to 2003 he was president of Great Western Homes. Great Western was acquired by Hovnanian Enterprises in 2003. From 2003 to 2007, Smith was a regional president for K. Hovnanian Homes. Before and during the time that he held these aforementioned positions he was active as a financial and business consultant at ExecuShare, Ltd. Smith also held a variety of quasi-public roles, such as the 2006–07 campaign chairman for the Mesa United Way and as a member of the citizens tax initiative committee.

=== 2008 election for mayor of Mesa ===
Smith launched his campaign for mayor on May 1, 2007, with former U.S. Congressman Matt Salmon as his campaign chairman. Incumbent Keno Hawker was term limited. The primary election had two other candidates: restaurant businessman/three term city councilman Rex Griswold and vice-mayor/two term city councilwoman Claudia Walters. Smith ranked first with 39% of the vote, qualifying for the run-off election. Griswold ranked second with 33% of the vote and Walters was last with 28% of the vote.

Walters endorsed Smith. In the May run-off election, Smith defeated Griswold 56%–44%. It was the first time that a candidate defeated someone who had resigned from the city council to run for mayor in more than a generation. Al Brooks was successful in 1983 and Willie Wong was successful in 1991. His first attempt at public office, Smith was the first person since 1966 to be elected mayor of Mesa without having first served on the Mesa City Council.

=== Mayor of Mesa (2008–2014) ===
Smith's first term of office ran from June 2, 2008 to January 22, 2013. Mesa, which is in Maricopa County, Arizona, along with Phoenix, is part of the Phoenix metropolitan area. It is the thirty-ninth most populous city in the United States and the third most populous city in the state of Arizona (after Phoenix and Tucson) according to 2010 United States Census Bureau estimates. It is the largest of six cities and a town with populations of 100,000 or more (followed by Glendale, Chandler, Scottsdale, Gilbert, Tempe and Peoria) that surround Phoenix in its metropolitan area.

On August 6, 2008, after two months as mayor, Smith served as ceremonial driver for the first run of METRO Light Rail, a new light rail transit for Phoenix, Mesa and Tempe. The 20-mile (32 km) light rail system had its grand opening on December 27, 2008.

In March 2009, Smith advocated for a development deal to bring a 1,200 room Gaylord Hotel and Resort to the Mesa Proving Grounds. Proposition 300, passed by the largest margin in the history of the city with 84% of voters approving.

In November 2011, Proposition 420 proposed an incentive package that would build the Chicago Cubs a new spring training facility. The Cubs, who had trained in Mesa for over 50 years, had offers to move their operations to Naples, Florida. Proposition 420 passed with 63% of the vote. Renderings of the planned stadium, and accompanying "Wrigleyville West" entertainment district were released prior to the election and it was expected that the stadium would be complete by the 2014 spring training season. In August 2011, it was reported that the Arizona State University baseball team would join the Cubs and move their facilities to the new stadium upon completion instead of renovating Packard Stadium, however they later moved to Phoenix Municipal Stadium.

Smith played a role in the Air Force Research Lab (AFRL) agreement, which allows Mesa to lease the facility and eventually own it while maintaining its highly classified status. The AFRL site is the only such secured facility in Arizona and is one of just a handful in the United States.

In January 2011 Smith unveiled iMesa, an improvement effort where residents submit, vote and comment on ideas for the community.

Smith was unopposed in his election for a second four-year term on August 28, 2012. His second term of office would have run from January 22, 2013 to January 23, 2017. Smith was term limited. Smith resigned April 16, 2014, before the end of his term, in order to run for governor.

He was president of the United States Conference of Mayors (USCM). He was the first Arizona mayor to serve as president of the organization.

The Wall Street Journal, Politico and The Arizona Republic have run op-ed pieces about the national debt crisis co-authored by Smith, then USCM president Antonio Villaraigosa and USCM vice president Michael Nutter. Smith has also been featured on Bloomberg Television, Andrea Mitchell Reports, CNBC's The Kudlow Report and in The Washington Post.

=== 2014 election for governor ===
Smith announced that he would run for Governor of Arizona on January 9, 2014. During the campaign, Smith was endorsed by Governor Jan Brewer on August 6, 2014, ahead of the Republican primary. While a gubernatorial candidate, Smith faced accusations from fellow Republicans that he was insufficiently conservative, due to his support for Medicaid expansion and Common Core education standards. In the end, Smith placed second to Doug Ducey in the Republican gubernatorial primary.

=== 2024 election for Mesa Mayor ===
In early 2023, Smith was considering returning to politics and running for the open Mesa Mayor position in 2024. Smith announced his candidacy on February 11, 2024. He faced opponent Mark Freeman but was narrowly defeated in the runoff.

=== Post-government activities ===
In 2016, Smith became been the chief executive of Valley Metro, the regional transit system operating in Phoenix and surrounding communities. Smith announced his resignation from this role in 2021, effective 2022. Smith stated that after five years in the role, he is "ready to move on to the next chapter in my life and turn the keys over to new leadership."

During the 2016 Republican Party presidential primaries, Smith was a supporter of the presidential campaign of Carly Fiorina.

== Personal life ==
Smith raised his children in Mesa.

== See also ==
- List of mayors of the largest 50 US cities
