= Wayne Pomeroy =

American politician (1923–2019)

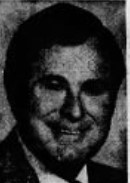

Mayor of Mesa, Arizona
- In office 1976–1980
- Preceded by: Eldon W. Cooley
- Succeeded by: Don Strauch

Personal details
- Born: March 13, 1923 Mesa, Arizona, U.S.
- Died: April 11, 2019 (aged 96) Mesa, Arizona, U.S.
- Spouse: Cecil Henrie (m.1944)
- Profession: Businessman

Wayne Casto Pomeroy (March 13, 1923 – April 11, 2019) was an American politician. He served as mayor of Mesa, Arizona from 1976 to 1980. He also previously served on the Mesa City Council from 1966 to 1974, and as vice mayor from 1972 to 1974. Pomeroy was born in Mesa, and is a descendant of one of the pioneer settlers of the area. He was a businessman and owner of a men's store, Pomeroy's Missionary Shop, in downtown Mesa. He was also a veteran of World War II, having served with the U.S. Army Air Forces, and was an alumnus of Brigham Young University and New York University. He married Cecil Henrie on December 21, 1944 and had four daughters. He died in April 2019 at the age of 96.
