= John Giles (American politician) =

American politician (born 1960)

- Giles in 2022

Lieutenant Governor-elect of Arizona
- Assuming office January 4, 2027
- Governor: Katie Hobbs
- Succeeding: Position established

Mayor of Mesa
- In office September 18, 2014 – January 7, 2025
- Preceded by: Scott Smith (Note: Alex Finter served as the acting Mayor of Mesa from April 16, 2014 until Giles took office)
- Succeeded by: Mark Freeman

Personal details
- Born: 1960 (age 65–66) Mesa, Arizona, U.S.
- Party: Republican (before 2026); Independent (2026–present)
- Spouse: Dawn
- Children: 5
- Education: Brigham Young University (BA); Arizona State University, Tempe (JD)

John Giles (born 1960) is an American politician and attorney who served as the 40th mayor of Mesa, Arizona, from 2014 to 2025. He is the inaugural lieutenant governor-elect of Arizona, being the first person elected to this new office. A political independent and former member of the Republican Party, he previously served as a member of the Mesa City Council from 1996 to 2000.

Giles was first elected mayor of Mesa in a 2014 special election. He was re-elected in 2016 and 2020. Despite being a registered Republican during his entire tenure as Mayor, he drew statewide and national attention for his opposition to Donald Trump, endorsing Kamala Harris in the 2024 presidential election. In 2022, he endorsed Democratic candidates for governor and U.S. Senate. He was a speaker at the 2024 Democratic National Convention. In August 2026, he was selected by Democratic governor Katie Hobbs as her running mate in the 2026 Arizona gubernatorial election.

== Early life and education ==
Giles was born in Mesa, Arizona, in 1960. He graduated from Westwood High School in 1978. A Mormon, he served a two-year mission for The Church of Jesus Christ of Latter-day Saints in South Korea from 1979 to 1981. He attended Brigham Young University, graduating with a Bachelor of Arts in Political Science in 1984. Giles received his JD from Arizona State University's Sandra Day O'Connor College of Law in 1987.

== Early career ==
Giles works as a government affairs lawyer with the firm Udall Shumway and previously owned Giles & Dickson, P.C. Giles was the president of the East Valley Bar Association from 1992 until 1993. Giles is an adjunct professor at the Sandra Day O'Connor College of Law.

Giles was elected to the Mesa City Council in 1996, serving until 2000, including a term as vice mayor from 1998 until 2000.

== Mayor of Mesa (2014-2025) ==
=== Elections ===
==== 2014 special ====
Giles was first elected mayor in 2014. Giles ran on the platform of keeping the trajectory for the city set by his predecessor. Opponent Danny Ray argued the current direction was the wrong direction. Giles received over 72% of the votes.

==== 2016 ====
Giles was reelected to his mayoral post in 2016, winning 99% of the vote as an uncontested candidate.

==== 2020 ====
Giles' most recent electoral victory took place in the 2020 non partisan primary, receiving just over 66% of the votes over opponent Verl Farnsworth. Giles received more than $250,000 in campaign donations. Farnsworth questioned the legality of the donations, although Giles said the donations were in accordance with election law. City finance and taxes were issues in the mayoral campaign.

Giles received over 50% of the vote in the primary, meaning no run-off election was required.

=== Tenure ===
Giles with Senator Kyrsten Sinema in 2019

Following Mayor Scott Smith's resignation in 2014, Giles was elected mayor in a special election, for a term lasting until 2017. He was sworn in on September 18, 2014.

In 2016, Giles was reelected to a full four-year term, which lasted until 2021. He was again reelected in 2020 and began his second full term in January 2021. He was succeeded by Mark Freeman in 2025.

In 2021, Giles led the adoption of a city nondiscrimination ordinance.

Giles speaking in 2022

Giles served as co-chair of the US Conference of Mayor's Veterans Homelessness Task Force. Under his leadership, the city aimed to house more homeless veterans. During Giles’ 2020 term, he focused on the Off the Streets Program. As Chair of the Maricopa Association of Governments (MAG), Giles started the program in 2021 to help combat homelessness, not just for veterans, but for all of the residents within Mesa. In 2023, Mesa City Council approved the purchase of a hotel to serve as an emergency shelter facility for the Off the Streets program.

In 2021, Giles launched the Mesa College Promise, a public/private partnership designed to provide a free community college education to qualified students. He supported expansion of the Mesa College Promise to adult learners in 2024.

In 2022, Giles requested federal funds in order to improve transportation, and the city received a $16 million grant through the Bipartisan Infrastructure Act. Giles' goal is a 40 percent increase in charging stations for electric vehicles along with expansion of the Tempe street car into Mesa. The city has adopted a climate action plan with a goal of using 100 percent renewable energy and being carbon neutral by 2050. Giles supported the renewal of Prop 400, a half a cent transportation tax in Maricopa County. The Maricopa Association of Government says that 53 percent, or about 14 billion, of the street car plan would come from Prop 400 extension.

In 2023, Giles was appointed by the Joint Office of Energy and Transportation to the Electric Vehicle Working Group, a federal committee charged with guiding the widespread adoption of electric vehicles across the country.

In 2025, Giles started working as a Mayoral Ambassador for Bloomberg Philanthropies. He was appointed by Governor Katie Hobbs to serve on the Arizona Department of Transportation Board and the Arizona Early Childhood Development and Health Board, widely referred to as First Things First.

The Mesa mayoral post has a two term limit. Giles reached this limit and was unable to run again in 2024. He was succeeded by city councilman Mark Freeman.

==== National politics ====
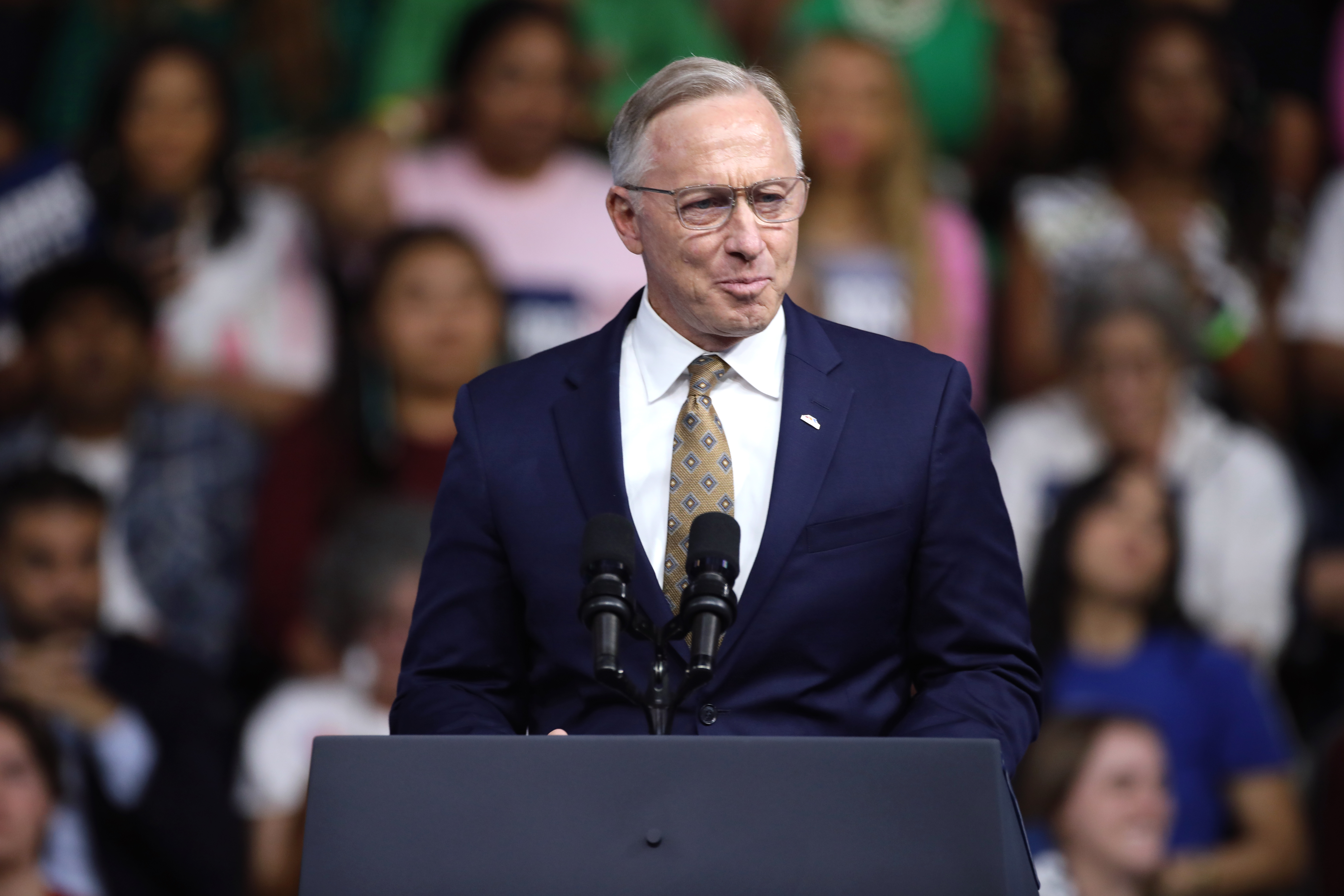
Giles speaking at a campaign rally for Vice President Kamala Harris in August 2024

Giles endorsed Democrat Mark Kelly over Republican Blake Masters in the 2022 U.S. Senate election. The Arizona Republican Party censured Giles over his endorsement of Kelly. He endorsed Democrat Kamala Harris in the 2024 United States presidential election over Donald Trump, the Republican nominee. He and former Arizona representative Robin Shaw co-chaired the state chapter of Republicans for Harris. He spoke at the 2024 Democratic National Convention on August 20.

== Lieutenant Governor of Arizona ==
=== 2026 election ===
Giles changed his party registration from Republican to independent in May 2026. In August 2026, The New York Times reported that Governor Katie Hobbs, a Democrat, was planning to select Giles as her running mate in the 2026 Arizona gubernatorial election. On August 11, Hobbs formally announced Giles as her running mate.

=== Tenure ===
Giles will become the first lieutenant governor of Arizona on January 4, 2027, and be sworn in during a public ceremony on January 5, 2027.

== Personal life ==
Giles and his wife, Dawn have five children and ten grandchildren. Giles is a marathoner and triathlete who has completed two full Ironman competitions and twenty marathons, including four Boston Marathons.

Giles is the host of It's Always Cool in Mesa, a podcast that shares the stories behind some of Mesa, Arizona's most popular outdoor adventures, culinary treasures, and unique history. In 2025, Giles started a YouTube series called "Lunch With the Mayor" where he visits mayors throughout Arizona to talk about their city at popular restaurants.

== Electoral history ==
2020 Mesa mayoral election
Party	Candidate	Votes	%
Nonpartisan	John Giles (incumbent)	60,473	66.25
Nonpartisan	Verl Farnsworth	30,452	33.36
Write-in	Write-ins	357	0.39
Total votes		91,282	100.00

Mesa mayoral election, 2016
Party	Candidate	Votes	%
Nonpartisan	John Giles (incumbent)	53,273	99.01%
Write-in	Write-ins	353	0.99%
Total votes		53,808	100.0%

Mesa Mayoral Special Election, 2014
Party	Candidate	Votes	%
Nonpartisan	John Giles	33,177	72.7%
Nonpartisan	Danny Ray	12,483	27.3%
Total votes		45,660	100.0%

Mesa City Council election, 1996
Party	Candidate	Votes	%
Nonpartisan	John Giles	17,426	23.2%
Nonpartisan	T. Farrell Jensen	15,949	21.2%
Nonpartisan	Dennis Kavanaugh	13,481	17.9%
Nonpartisan	Lillian Wilkinson	10,407	13.8%
Nonpartisan	Dana B. Harper	10,053	13.4%
Nonpartisan	David Molina	7,831	10.4%
Total votes		75,147	100.0%

Mesa City Council at-large primary, 1996
Party	Candidate	Votes	%
Nonpartisan	John Giles	14,392	15.8%
Nonpartisan	T. Farrell Jensen	11,861	13.1%
Nonpartisan	Lillian Wilkinson	10,885	12.0%
Nonpartisan	David Molina	10,070	11.1%
Nonpartisan	Dennis Kavanaugh	9,848	10.8%
Nonpartisan	Dana B. Harper	9,635	10.6%
Nonpartisan	Michael D. Whiting	9,196	10.1%
Nonpartisan	Manuel Cortez	5,873	6.5%
Nonpartisan	David A. Wier	5,403	6.0%
Nonpartisan	John Robie	6,639	4.0%
Total votes		90,802	100.0%

== See also ==
- List of mayors of the 50 largest cities in the United States

Party political offices
First	Democratic nominee for Lieutenant Governor of Arizona; 2026	Most recent
Political offices
New office	Lieutenant Governor of Arizona; Taking office 2027	Elect
