= List of mayors of Mesa, Arizona =

Mayor of Mesa, Arizona
- Flag of Mesa, Arizona

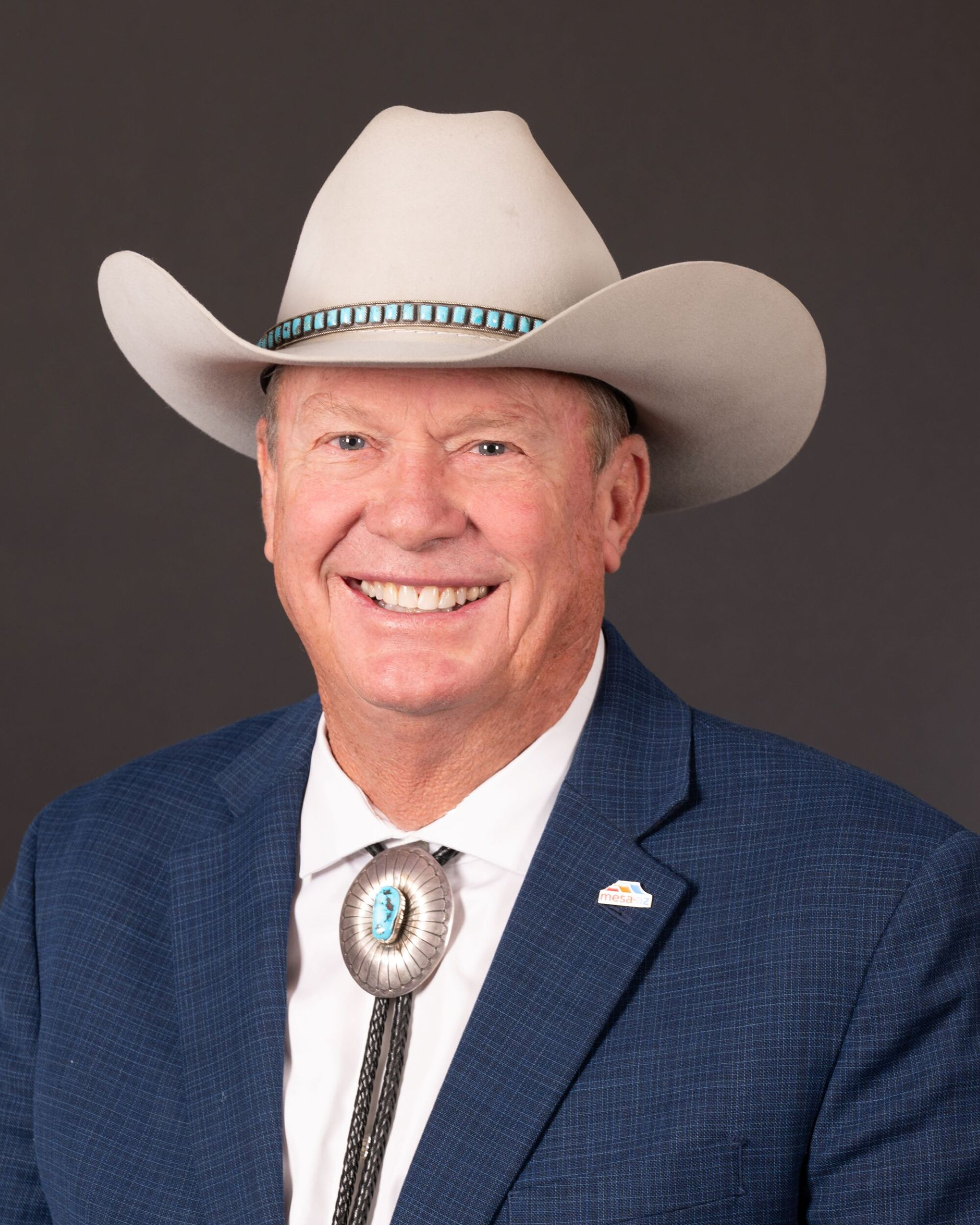
- Incumbent; Mark Freeman since 2025
- Type: Mayor
- Member of: City council
- Term length: 4 years
- Formation: July 15, 1883
- First holder: Alexander Findlay Macdonald
- Deputy: Vice mayor
- Salary: $74,745.16
- Website: https://www.mesaaz.gov/government/mayor-council

The following is a list of the mayors of Mesa, Arizona.

== Mayors ==
#	Portrait	Mayor	Took office	Left office	Ref.
1		Alexander Findlay MacDonald	1883	1885	
2		Alvin Franklin Stewart	1885	1886	
3		George Passey	1886	1888	
4		William Johnson LeBaron	1888	1896	
5		James Rouse Turman	1896	1898	
6		David Tully LeBaron Jr.	1898	1899	
7		William A. Kimball	1899	1900	
8		Jedidiah Grant Peterson (1st term)	1900	1902	
9		Charles M. Mullen	1902	1904	
10		John L. Waring	1904	1906	
11		Phil Metz	1906	1908	
12		John D. Loper	1908	1908	
13		Lionel Brand Johnson	1908	1908	
14		John H. Barnett	1908	1910	
15		Ralph Fleetwood Palmer	1910	1912	
16		John Taylor LeSueur	1912	1914	
17		Max Viault	1914	1916	
18		Paul Baxter Beville	1916	1918	
19		Dan H. Kleinman	1918	1922	
20		Robert Scott	1922	1924	
21		Jedidiah Grant Peterson (2nd term)	1924	1936	
22		Linford B. Werner	1936	1938	
23		George Nicholas Goodman (1st term)	1938	1942	
24		John A. Hamblin	1942	1944	
25		Zebulon Pearce	1944	1946	
26		George Nicholas Goodman (2nd term)	1946	1948	
27		Frank E. Bendick	1948	1950	
28		Oscar Virgil Crismon	1950	1952	
29		George Nicholas Goodman (3rd term)	1952	1956	
30		Richard G. Johnson Sr.	1956	1958	
31		Egbert J. Brown	1958	1966	
32		Jack Taylor	1966	1972	
33		Eldon W. Cooley	1972	1976	
34		Wayne C. Pomeroy	1976	1980	
35		Don W. Strauch	1980	1984	
36		Sumner "Al" Brooks	1984	1988	
37		Margaret "Peggy" Rubach	1988	1992	
38		William "Willie" Wong	1992	1996	
39		Wayne Brown	1996	2000	
40		Keno L. Hawker	2000	2008	
41		Scott W. Smith	2008	2014	
42		Alex Finter	2014	2014	
43		John Giles	2014	2025	
44		Mark Freeman	2025	Incumbent	

== See also ==
- List of mayors of the 50 largest cities in the United States
