= 2016 United States House of Representatives elections in Arizona =

- November 8, 2016

All 9 Arizona seats to the United States House of Representatives
	Majority party	Minority party
Party	Republican	Democratic
Last election	5	4
Seats won	5	4
Seat change	Steady	Steady
Popular vote	1,266,088	1,078,620
Percentage	51.55%	43.92%
Swing	▼4.13%	▲4.54%

Republican
40–50%
50–60%
60–70%
70–80%
Democratic
40–50%
50–60%
60–70%
70–80%
90–100%

The 2016 United States House of Representatives elections in Arizona were held on November 8, 2016, to elect the nine U.S. representatives from the state of Arizona, one from each of the state's nine congressional districts. The elections coincided with the 2016 U.S. presidential election, as well as other elections to the House of Representatives, elections to the United States Senate and various state and local elections. The primaries were held on August 30.

== Overview ==
=== Statewide ===
Party	Candidates	Votes		Seats		
Party	Candidates	No.	%	No.	+/–	%
Republican	9	1,266,088	51.55	5	Steady	55.56
Democratic	8	1,078,620	43.92	4	Steady	44.44
Green	4	110,820	4.51	0	Steady	0.0
Write-in	5	548	0.02	0	Steady	0.0
Total	26	2,456,076	100.0	9	Steady	100.0

Popular vote
Republican	51.55%
Democratic	43.92%
Green	4.51%
Other	0.02%

House seats
Republican	55.56%
Democratic	44.44%

=== By district ===
Results of the 2016 United States House of Representatives elections in Arizona by district:

District	Republican		Democratic		Others		Total		Result
District	Votes	%	Votes	%	Votes	%	Votes	%	Result
District 1	121,745	43.37%	142,219	50.66%	16,746	5.97%	280,710	100.0%	Democratic hold
District 2	179,806	56.96%	135,873	43.04%	0	0.00%	315,679	100.0%	Republican hold
District 3	1,635	1.08%	148,973	98.63%	427	0.28%	151,035	100.0%	Democratic hold
District 4	203,487	71.45%	81,296	28.55%	0	0.00%	284,783	100.0%	Republican hold
District 5	205,184	64.10%	114,940	35.90%	0	0.00%	320,124	100.0%	Republican hold
District 6	201,578	62.13%	122,866	37.87%	0	0.00%	324,444	100.0%	Republican hold
District 7	39,286	24.74%	119,465	75.22%	60	0.04%	158,811	100.0%	Democratic hold
District 8	204,942	68.55%	0	0.00%	94,029	31.45%	298,971	100.0%	Republican hold
District 9	108,350	39.04%	169,055	60.92%	106	0.04%	277,511	100.0%	Democratic hold
Total	1,266,088	51.55%	1,078,620	43.92%	111,368	4.53%	2,456,076	100.0%	

== District 1 ==
2016 Arizona's 1st congressional district election
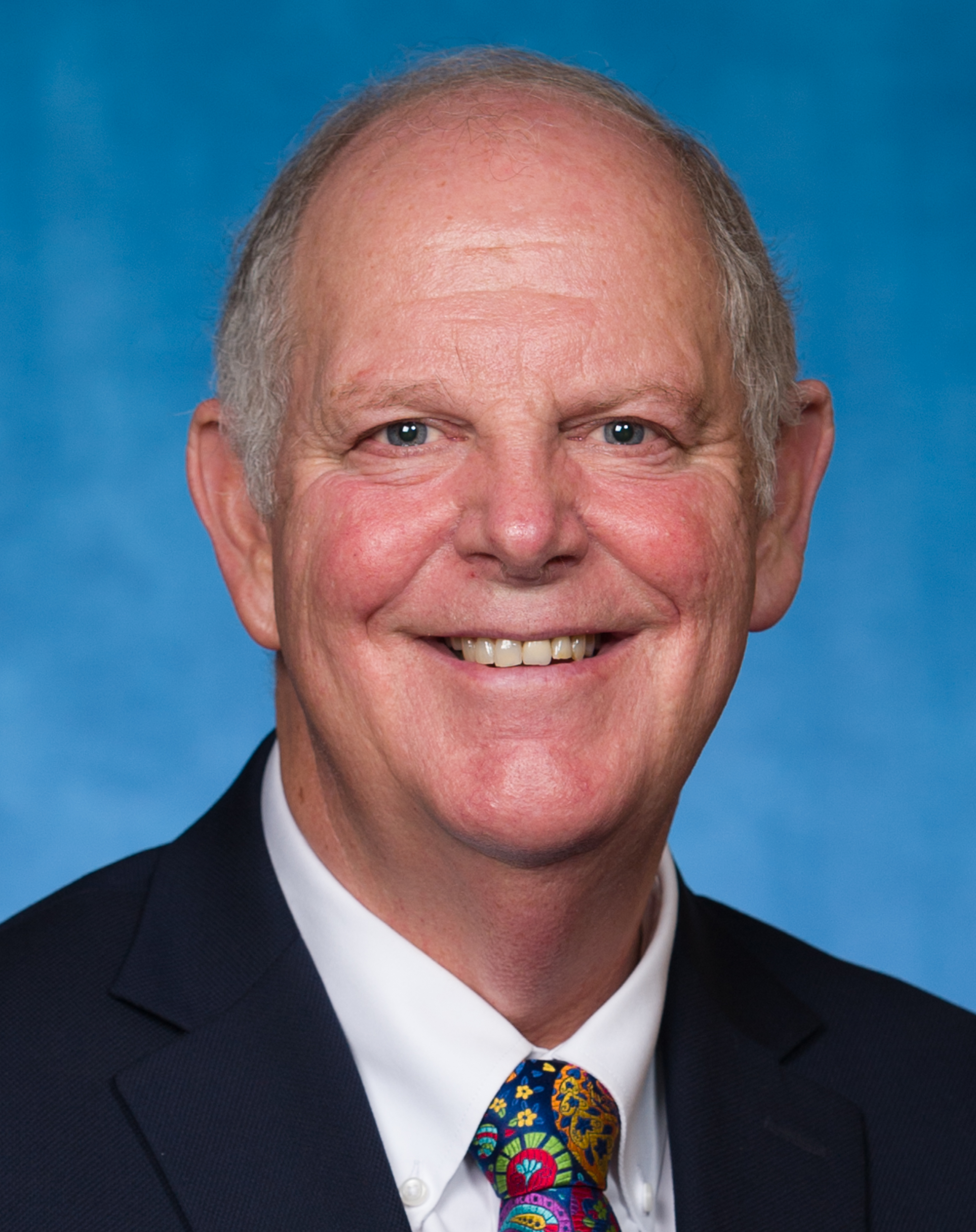

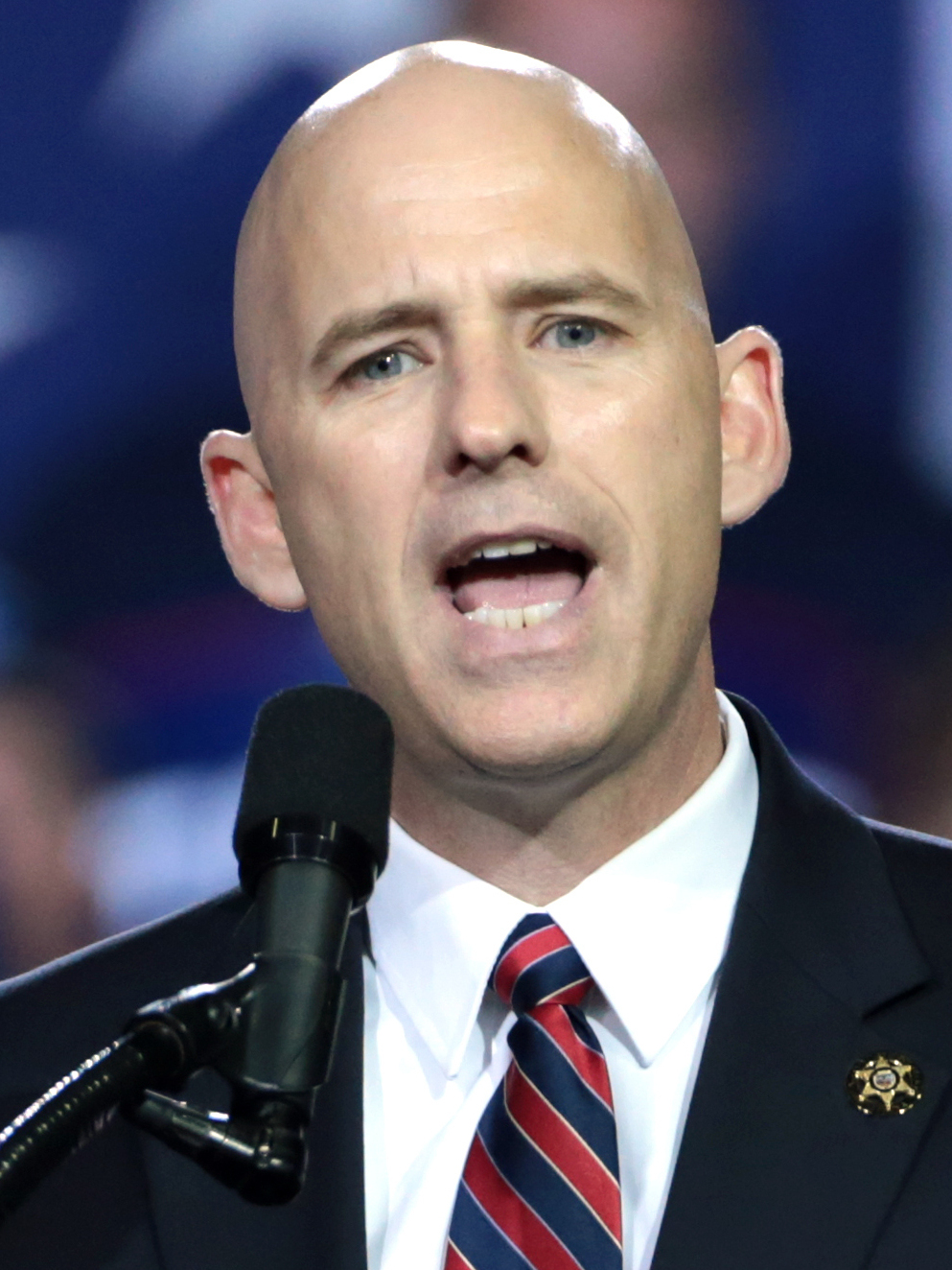

Nominee	Tom O'Halleran	Paul Babeu	Ray Parrish
Party	Democratic	Republican	Green
Popular vote	142,219	121,745	16,746
Percentage	50.7%	43.3%	5.9%
- County results O'Halleran: 40–50% 50–60% 60–70% 70–80% Babeu: 40–50% 50–60%
U.S. Representative before election
Ann Kirkpatrick
Democratic
Elected U.S. Representative
Tom O'Halleran
Democratic

Incumbent Democrat Ann Kirkpatrick, who had represented the district since 2013, and previously between 2009 and 2011, ran for the U.S. Senate seat held by John McCain. She was re-elected in 2014 with 52% of the vote.

=== Democratic primary ===
==== Candidates ====
===== Nominee =====
- Tom O'Halleran, former Republican state senator and independent candidate for state senate in 2014

===== Eliminated in primary =====
- Miguel Olivas, former Republican congressional aide, Democratic candidate for this seat in 2012 and Libertarian candidate for 3rd district in 2014

===== Withdrawn =====
- James Maloney, small business owner

===== Declined =====
- Ann Kirkpatrick, incumbent U.S. Representative
- Fred DuVal, former chairman of the Arizona Board of Regents and nominee for governor in 2014
- Catherine Miranda, state senator
- Liz Archuleta, chair of the Coconino County Board of Supervisors
- Brad Carlyon, Navajo County Attorney
- Chris Deschene, former state representative, nominee for secretary of state in 2010, and candidate for President of the Navajo Nation in 2014
- Barbara McGuire, state senator

==== Endorsements ====
Tom O'Halleran

U.S. Representatives

- Ron Barber, former U.S. Representative (AZ−2)
- Ann Kirkpatrick, incumbent U.S. Representative (AZ−1)

Statewide officials

- Terry Goddard, former Attorney General, nominee for governor in 1990 and 2010 and nominee for Secretary of State in 2014

Labor unions

- AFL-CIO

Individuals

- Fred DuVal, former chairman of the Arizona Board of Regents and nominee for governor in 2014, state representative
- Felecia Rotellini, nominee for Attorney General in 2010 and 2014

==== Results ====
Democratic primary results
Party	Candidate	Votes	%
Democratic	Tom O'Halleran	30,833	58.8
Democratic	Miguel Olivas	21,632	41.2
Total votes		52,465	100.0

=== Republican primary ===
On the Republican side, rancher and candidate for the seat in 2014 Gary Kiehne ran again. Pinal County Sheriff Paul Babeu also ran in the primary.

==== Candidates ====
===== Nominee =====
- Paul Babeu, Pinal County Sheriff

===== Eliminated in primary =====
- Ken Bennett, former secretary of state, former president of the Arizona Senate, and candidate for governor in 2014
- Gary Kiehne, rancher, businessman and candidate in 2014
- Shawn Redd, businessman
- Wendy Rogers, former air force officer and nominee for the 9th district in 2014

===== Withdrawn =====
- Carlyle Begay, state senator, (endorsed Babeu)
- David Gowan, Speaker of the Arizona House of Representatives, (endorsed Kiehne) (remained on ballot)

===== Declined =====
- David Tenney, director of the Arizona Residential Utility Consumer Office and former Navajo County Supervisor
- Andy Tobin, director of the Arizona Department of Weights and Measures, former Speaker of the Arizona House of Representatives and nominee for this seat in 2014

==== Endorsements ====
Ken Bennett

U.S. Senators

- Jon Kyl, former US senator

U.S. Representatives

- John Shadegg, former US representative

Newspapers

- The Arizona Republic

Local officials

- Chris Gibbs, Mayor of Safford, Arizona
- Christian Price, Mayor of Maricopa, Arizona
- Bob Rivera, Mayor of Thatcher, Arizona
- Anthony Smith, Pinal County supervisor
- Todd House, Pinal County supervisor
- Cheryl Chase, Pinal County supervisor
- Jack Smith, Yavapai County supervisor
- Chip Davis, Yavapai County supervisor
- Craig Brower, Yavapai County supervisor
- Rowle Simmons, Yavapai County supervisor
- Thomas Thurman, Yavapai County supervisor
- Drew John, Gila County supervisor
- Danny Smith, Gila County supervisor
Gary Kiehene

State legislators

- David Gowan, Speaker of the Arizona House of Representatives

Newspapers

- Tri-valley Central
- White Mountain Independent

Local officials

- Steve Miller, Pinal County supervisor
- PJ Allred, Graham County Sheriff
- Bryce Hamblin, Mayor of Eagar, Arizona
Paul Babeu

U.S. Representatives

- Jim Kolbe, former US representative

Statewide officials

- Jan Brewer, former governor

State legislators

- Carlyle Begay, state senator
Wendy Rogers

State legislators

- Adam Kwasman, former state representative

Individuals

- Lucy Babeu and Veronica Keating, candidate Paul Babeu's sisters

==== Debate ====
2016 Arizona's 1st congressional district republican primary debate
No.	Date	Host	Moderator	Link	Republican	Republican	Republican	Republican	Republican	Republican
Key: P Participant A Absent N Not invited I Invited W Withdrawn										
Key: P Participant A Absent N Not invited I Invited W Withdrawn					Paul Babeu	Ken Bennett	David Gowan	Gary Kiehne	Shawn Redd	Wendy Rogers
1	Jul. 13, 2016	KAET	Ted Simons		I	P	I	I	P	P

==== Results ====
Republican primary results
Party	Candidate	Votes	%
Republican	Paul Babeu	19,533	30.8
Republican	Gary Kiehne	14,854	23.4
Republican	Wendy Rogers	14,222	22.4
Republican	Ken Bennett	10,578	16.7
Republican	Shawn Redd	2,098	3.3
Republican	David Gowan	2,091	3.3
Total votes		63,376	100.0

=== General election ===
==== Endorsements ====
Tom O'Halleran (D)

U.S. Representatives

- Ron Barber, former U.S. Representative (AZ−2)
- Ann Kirkpatrick, incumbent U.S. Representative (AZ−1)

Statewide officials

- Terry Goddard, former attorney general, nominee for governor in 1990 and 2010 and nominee for Secretary of State in 2014

Labor unions

- AFL-CIO

Organizations

- Democratic Congressional Campaign Committee "Red to Blue" Program

Newspapers

- Arizona Daily Star

Individuals

- Fred DuVal, former chairman of the Arizona Board of Regents and nominee for governor in 2014, state representative
- Felecia Rotellini, nominee for Attorney General in 2010 and 2014
Paul Babeu (R)

U.S. Representatives

- Jim Kolbe, former US representative

Statewide officials

- Jan Brewer, former governor

State legislators

- Carlyle Begay, state senator

Organizations

- National Republican Congressional Committee "Young Guns" Program

==== Debate ====
2016 Arizona's 1st congressional district debate
No.	Date	Host	Moderator	Link	Democratic	Republican
Key: P Participant A Absent N Not invited I Invited W Withdrawn						
Key: P Participant A Absent N Not invited I Invited W Withdrawn					Tom O'Halleran	Paul Babeu
1	Sep. 28, 2016	Arizona PBS	Ted Simons		P	P

==== Polling ====
Poll source	Date(s) administered	Sample size	Margin of error	Tom O'Halleran (D)	Paul Babeu (R)	Undecided
Global Strategy Group (D−DCCC)	September 22–25, 2016	400	± 4.9%	45%	38%	17%

==== Predictions ====
Source	Ranking	As of
The Cook Political Report	Lean D	November 7, 2016
Daily Kos Elections	Lean D	November 7, 2016
Rothenberg	Lean D	November 3, 2016
Sabato's Crystal Ball	Lean D	November 7, 2016
RCP	Tossup	October 31, 2016

==== Results ====
Arizona’s 1st congressional district, 2016
Party	Candidate	Votes	%
Democratic	Tom O'Halleran	142,219	50.7
Republican	Paul Babeu	121,745	43.4
Green	Ray Parrish	16,746	5.9
Majority		20,474	7.3
Total votes		280,710	100.0
Democratic hold			

== District 2 ==
2016 Arizona's 2nd congressional district election
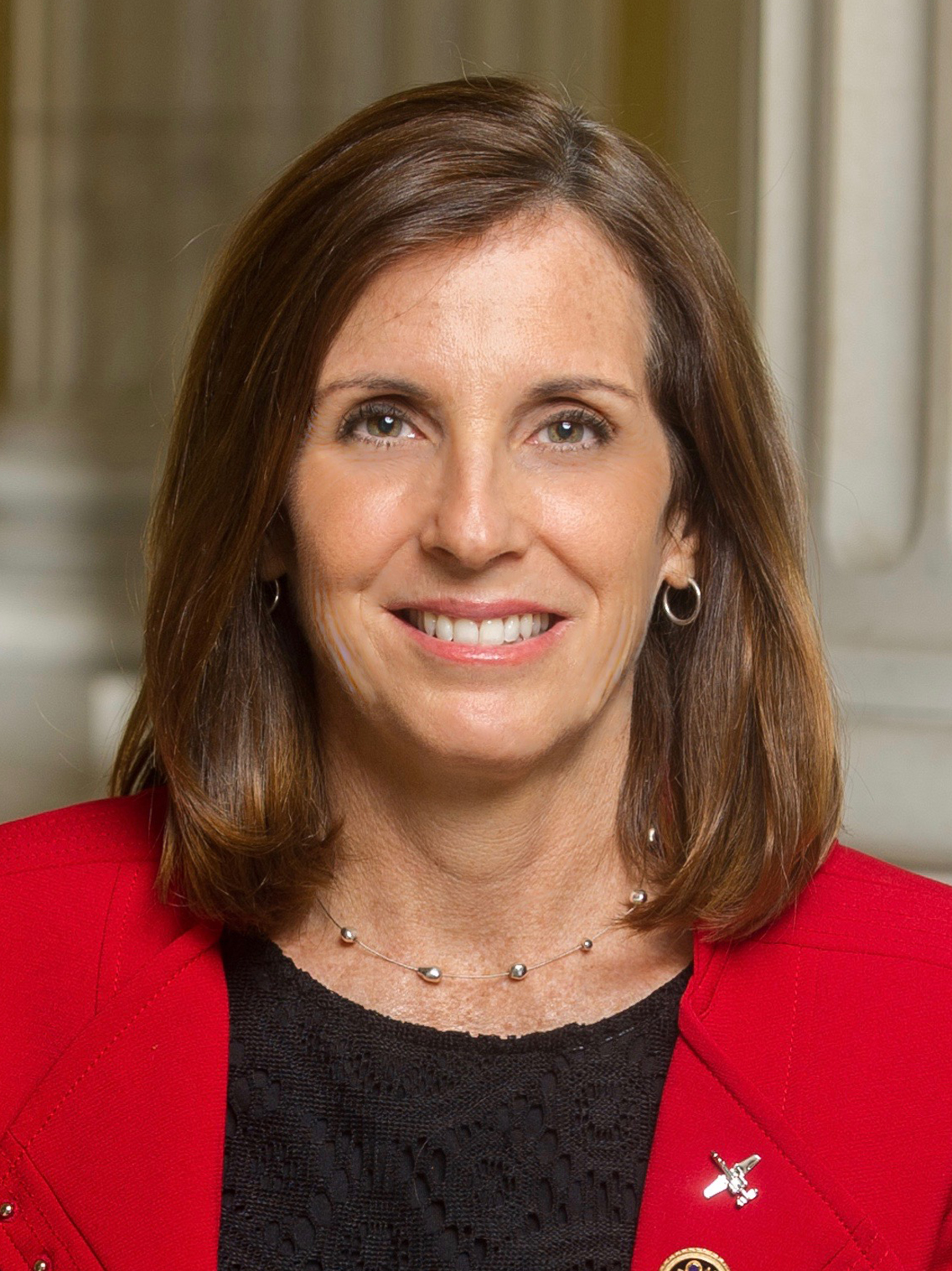

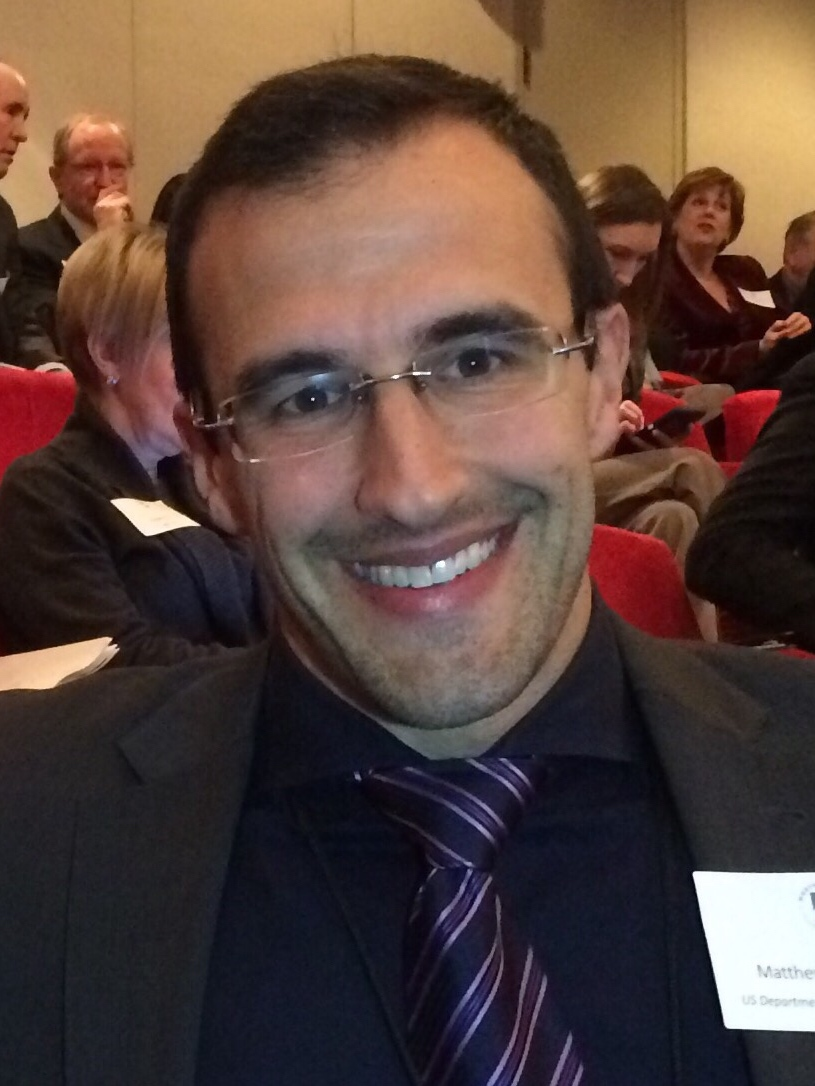
Nominee	Martha McSally	Matt Heinz
Party	Republican	Democratic
Popular vote	179,806	135,873
Percentage	57.0%	43.0%
- County results McSally: 50–60% 60–70%
U.S. Representative before election
Martha McSally
Republican
Elected U.S. Representative
Martha McSally
Republican

Incumbent Republican Martha McSally, who had represented the district since 2015, ran for re-election. She defeated Democratic incumbent Ron Barber in 2014 with 50% of the vote

=== Republican primary ===
==== Candidates ====
===== Nominee =====
- Martha McSally, incumbent U.S. representative

==== Results ====
Republican primary results
Party	Candidate	Votes	%
Republican	Martha McSally (incumbent)	69,378	100.0
Total votes		69,378	100.0

=== Democratic primary ===
State Representative Bruce Wheeler had formed an exploratory committee to run for the Democratic nomination, but decided not to run after having surgery to repair a torn retina.

==== Candidates ====
===== Nominee =====
- Matt Heinz, former state representative and candidate for 8th district in 2012

===== Eliminated in primary =====
- Victoria Steele, state representative

===== Declined =====
- Ron Barber, former U.S. representative
- David Bradley, state senator
- Fred DuVal, former chairman of the Arizona Board of Regents and nominee for governor in 2014
- Steve Farley, state senator
- Randall Friese, state representative
- Steve Kozachik, Tucson City Councilman
- Nan Walden, businesswoman, attorney and former chief of staff to Senator Bill Bradley
- Bruce Wheeler, state representative
- Paula Aboud, former state senator
- Mark Kelly, retired astronaut and husband of former U.S. representative Gabby Giffords

==== Endorsements ====
Matt Heinz

U.S. Representatives

- Ruben Gallego, US representative from Arizona
- Jared Polis, US representative from Colorado
- Kyrsten Sinema, US representative from Arizona

State legislators

- Ed Ableser, former state senator
- Amanda Aguirre, former state senator
- David Bradley, state senator
- Olivia Cajero Bedford, state senator
- Cloves Campbell, former state representative
- Robert Cannell, former state senator
- Mark Cardenas, state representative
- Ken Cheuvront, former state senator
- Demion Clinco, former state representative
- Ann English, Cochise County supervisor
- Pat Fleming, former state representative and US Army analyst
- Randall Friese, state representative
- Rosanna Gabaldón, state representative
- Steve Gallardo, Maricopa County Supervisor
- Linda J. Lopez, former state senator
- Stefanie Mach, state representative
- Robert Meza, state senator
- Lynne Pancrazi, state senator
- Elaine Richardson, former state senator
- Macario Saldate, state representative

Labor unions

- AFL-CIO
- American Osteopathic Association

Organizations

- New Democrat Coalition
- Victory Fund

Newspapers

- The Arizona Republic

Local officials

- Daniel Hernández Jr., clerk and former president of the Sunnyside Unified School District
- Sandra Kelly, former member of the Arizona Corporation Commission
- Thomas Volgy, former Mayor of Tucson
Victoria Steele

U.S. Representatives

- Raul Grijalva, US representative from Arizona

State legislators

- Eric Meyer, House Minority Leader
- Rebecca Rios, Minority Whip
- Steve Farley, Senate Assistant Minority Leader
- Richard Andrade, state representative
- Reginald Bolding, state representative
- Jennifer D. Benally, state representative
- Diego Espinosa, state representative
- Charlene Fernandez, state representative
- Jonathan Larkin, state representative
- Debbie McCune Davis, state representative
- Juan Mendez, state representative
- Albert Hale, state representative
- Andrew Sherwood, state representative
- Lela Alston, state representative

Local officials

- Barbara LaWall, Pima County Attorney
- Chris Nanos, Pima County Sheriff

==== Results ====
Democratic primary results
Party	Candidate	Votes	%
Democratic	Matt Heinz	32,017	52.8
Democratic	Victoria Steele	28,658	47.2
Total votes		60,675	100.0

=== General election ===
==== Endorsements ====
Martha McSally (R)

Organizations

- Maggie's List
- National Republican Congressional Committee "Patriot" Program

Newspapers

- Arizona Daily Star
Matt Heinz (D)

U.S. Representatives

- Ruben Gallego, US representative from Arizona
- Jared Polis, US representative from Colorado
- Kyrsten Sinema, US representative from Arizona

State legislators

- Ed Ableser, former state senator
- Amanda Aguirre, former state senator
- David Bradley, state senator
- Olivia Cajero Bedford, state senator
- Cloves Campbell, former state representative
- Robert Cannell, former state senator
- Mark Cardenas, state representative
- Ken Cheuvront, former state senator
- Demion Clinco, former state representative
- Pat Fleming, former state representative and US Army analyst
- Randall Friese, state representative
- Rosanna Gabaldón, state representative
- Linda J. Lopez, former state senator
- Stefanie Mach, state representative
- Robert Meza, state senator
- Lynne Pancrazi, state senator
- Elaine Richardson, former state senator
- Macario Saldate, state representative
- Victoria Steele, state representative and primary candidate for this seat

Labor unions

- AFL-CIO
- American Osteopathic Association

Organizations

- Democratic Congressional Campaign Committee "Red to Blue" Program
- New Democrat Coalition
- Victory Fund

Newspapers

- The Arizona Republic

==== Polling ====
Poll source	Date(s) administered	Sample size	Margin of error	Martha McSally (R)	Matt Heinz (D)	Undecided
Wilson Perkins Allen Research	September 14–15, 2016	400	± 4.9%	56%	37%	7%

==== Predictions ====
Source	Ranking	As of
The Cook Political Report	Likely R	November 7, 2016
Daily Kos Elections	Likely R	November 7, 2016
Rothenberg	Safe R	November 3, 2016
Sabato's Crystal Ball	Likely R	November 7, 2016
RCP	Lean R	October 31, 2016

==== Results ====
Arizona’s 2nd congressional district election, 2016
Party	Candidate	Votes	%
Republican	Martha McSally (incumbent)	179,806	57.0
Democratic	Matt Heinz	135,873	43.0
Majority		43,933	14.0
Total votes		315,679	100.0
Republican hold			

== District 3 ==
2016 Arizona's 3rd congressional district election
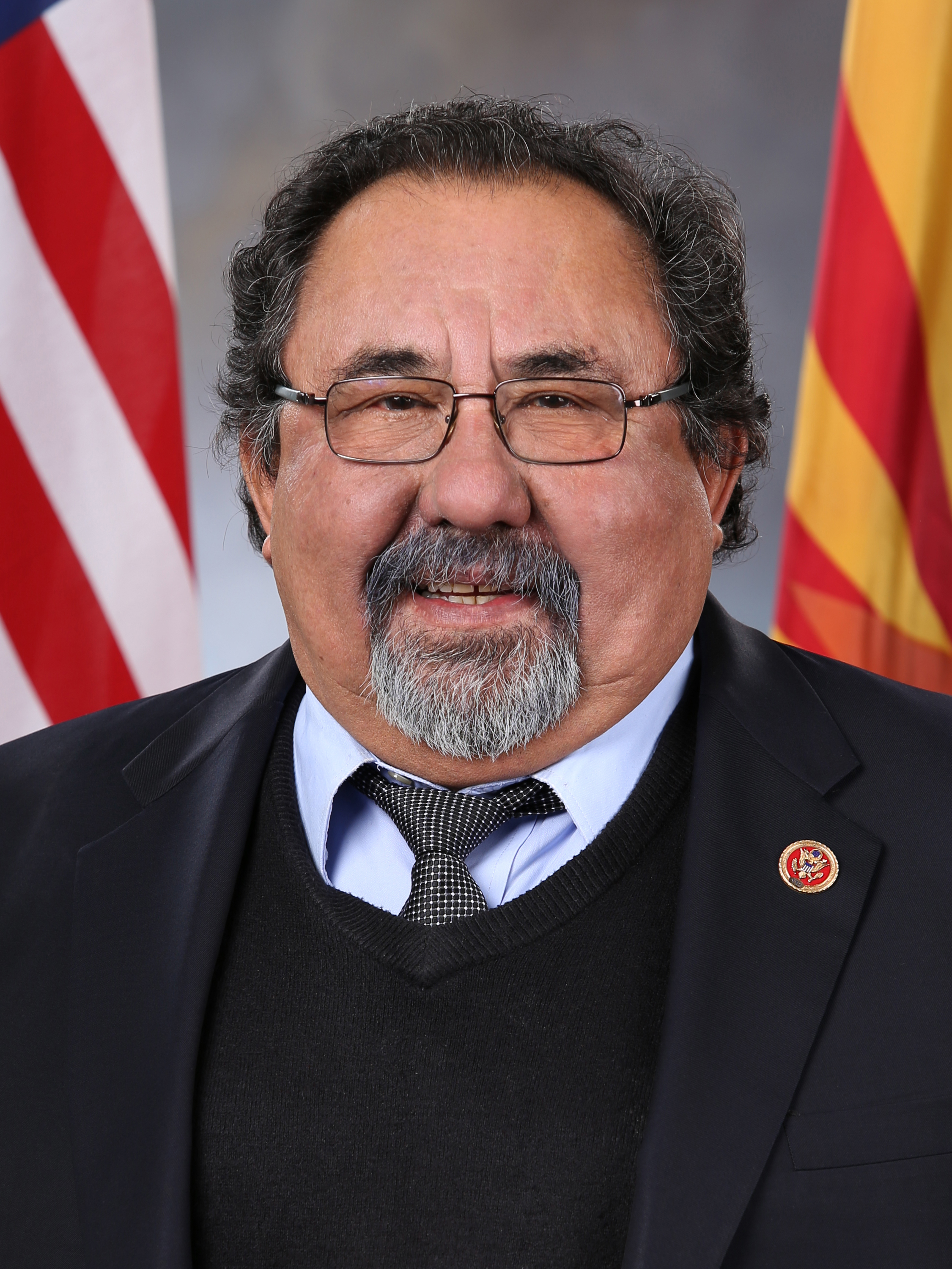
Nominee	Raúl Grijalva
Party	Democratic
Popular vote	148,973
Percentage	96.6%
U.S. Representative before election
Raúl Grijalva
Democratic
Elected U.S. Representative
Raúl Grijalva
Democratic

Incumbent Democrat Raúl Grijalva who had represented the district since 2003, ran for re-election. He was re-elected in 2014 with 55.7% of the vote.

=== Democratic primary ===
==== Candidates ====
===== Nominee =====
- Raúl Grijalva, incumbent U.S. Representative

===== Declined =====
- James Villarreal, Senior Propulsion Engineer at Raytheon and University of Arizona instructor

==== Results ====
Democratic primary results
Party	Candidate	Votes	%
Democratic	Raúl Grijalva (incumbent)	35,844	100.0
Total votes		35,844	100.0

=== Republican primary ===
==== Candidates ====
===== Declined =====
- Edna San Miguel, artist and former teacher

=== General election ===
Grijalva faced only Libertarian write-in candidate Mike Ross in the general election. The Arizona secretary of state reported no results for Ross.

==== Endorsements ====
Raúl Grijalva (D)

Labor unions

- AFL-CIO

==== Predictions ====
Source	Ranking	As of
The Cook Political Report	Safe D	November 7, 2016
Daily Kos Elections	Safe D	November 7, 2016
Rothenberg	Safe D	November 3, 2016
Sabato's Crystal Ball	Safe D	November 7, 2016
RCP	Safe D	October 31, 2016

==== Results ====
Arizona’s 3rd congressional district, 2016
Party	Candidate	Votes	%
Democratic	Raúl Grijalva (incumbent)	148,973	98.6
Republican	Bill Abatecola (write-in)	1,303	0.9
Republican	Jaime Vasquez (write-in)	332	0.2
Democratic	Harvey Martin (write-in)	283	0.2
Independent	Federico Sanchez (write-in)	144	0.1
Total votes		151,035	100.0
Democratic hold			

== District 4 ==
2016 Arizona's 4th congressional district election
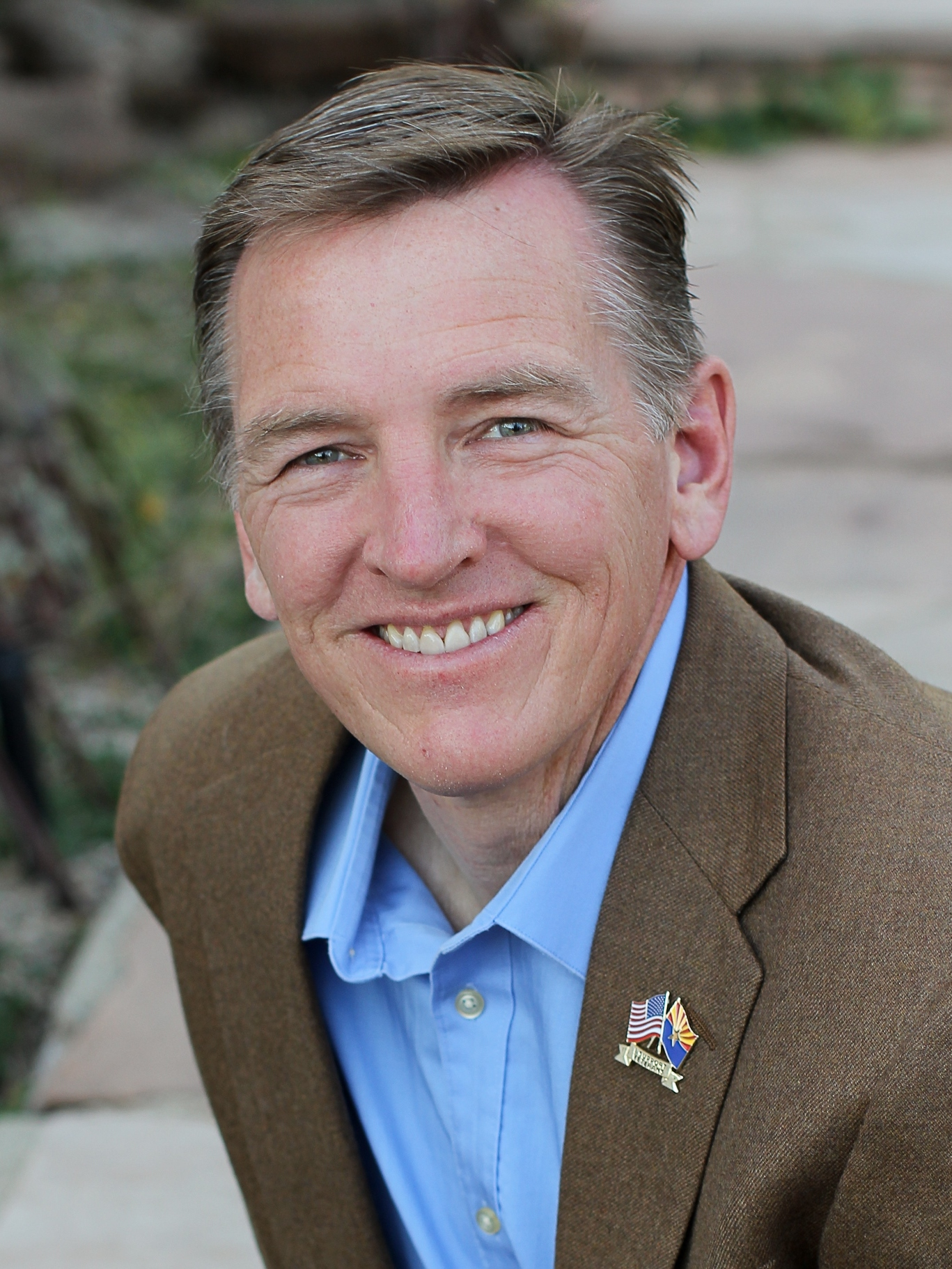

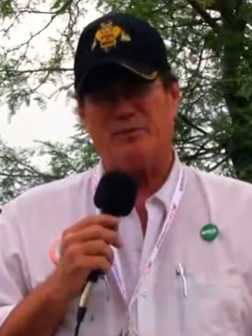
Nominee	Paul Gosar	Mikel Weisser
Party	Republican	Democratic
Popular vote	203,487	81,296
Percentage	71.4%	28.6%
- County results Gosar: 60–70% 70–80%
U.S. Representative before election
Paul Gosar
Republican
Elected U.S. Representative
Paul Gosar
Republican

Incumbent Republican Paul Gosar, who had represented the district since 2011, ran for re-election. He was re-elected to a third term in 2014 with 70% of the vote.

=== Republican primary ===
==== Candidates ====
===== Nominee =====
- Paul Gosar, incumbent U.S. representative

===== Eliminated in primary =====
- Ray Strauss, Buckeye City Councilman

==== Endorsements ====
Ray Strauss

Local officials

- Hildy Angius, Mohave County Supervisor
- Steve Moss, Mohave County Supervisor
- Ed Foster
Paul Gosar

U.S. Senators

- Ted Cruz, Senator (R-TX)

U.S. Representatives

- David Schweikert, Congressman
- Trent Franks, Congressman
- Jeff Miller, Congressman (R-FL)

Statewide officials

- Sarah Palin, former governor of Alaska

State legislators

- Bob Thorpe, state representative.

Newspapers

- Tri-Valley Central

Local officials

- Joe Arpaio, Maricopa County Sheriff
- Mark Nexsen, Mayor of Lake Havasu
- John Cook, Mayor of Wickenburg

==== Results ====
Republican primary results
Party	Candidate	Votes	%
Republican	Paul Gosar (incumbent)	64,947	71.4
Republican	Ray Strauss	25,991	28.6
Total votes		90,938	100.0

=== Democratic primary ===
==== Candidates ====
===== Nominee =====
- Mikel Weisser, homeless shelter administrator, candidate for this seat in 2012 and nominee in 2014

==== Results ====
Democratic primary results
Party	Candidate	Votes	%
Democratic	Mikel Weisser	24,097	100.0
Total votes		24,097	100.0

=== General election ===
==== Predictions ====
Source	Ranking	As of
The Cook Political Report	Safe R	November 7, 2016
Daily Kos Elections	Safe R	November 7, 2016
Rothenberg	Safe R	November 3, 2016
Sabato's Crystal Ball	Safe R	November 7, 2016
RCP	Safe R	October 31, 2016

==== Results ====
Arizona’s 4th congressional district, 2016
Party	Candidate	Votes	%
Republican	Paul Gosar (Incumbent)	203,487	71.4
Democratic	Mikel Weisser	81,296	28.6
Total votes		284,783	100.0
Republican hold			

== District 5 ==
2016 Arizona's 5th congressional district election
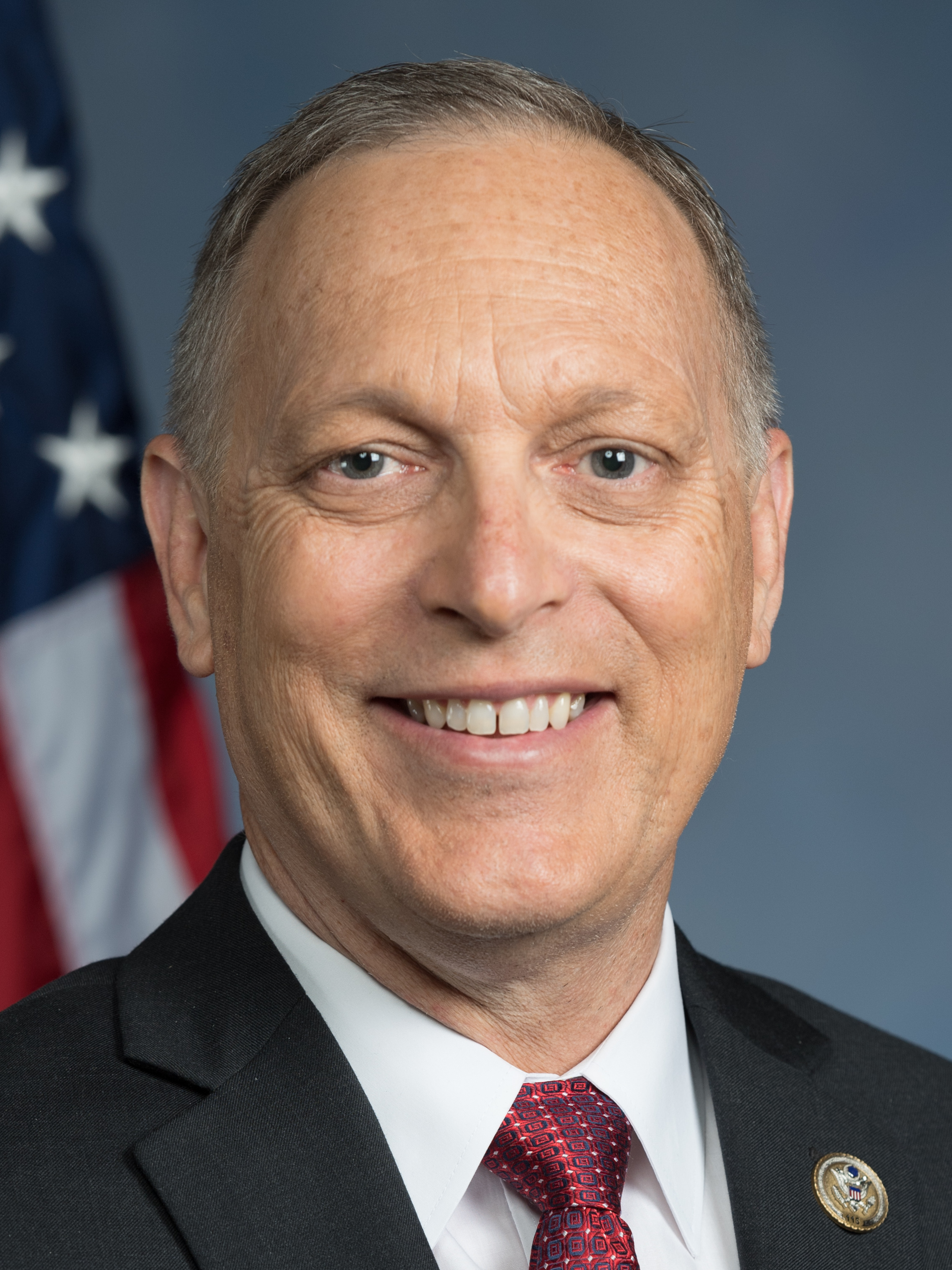

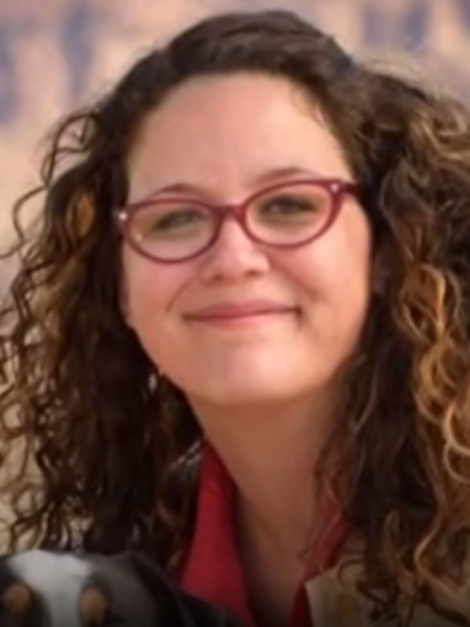
Nominee	Andy Biggs	Talia Fuentes
Party	Republican	Democratic
Popular vote	205,184	114,940
Percentage	64.1%	35.9%
- Precinct results Biggs: 50–60% 60–70% 70–80% Fuentes: 50–60%
U.S. Representative before election
Matt Salmon
Republican
Elected U.S. Representative
Andy Biggs
Republican

Incumbent Republican Matt Salmon, who had represented the district since 2013, and previously between 1995 and 2001, did not run for reelection.

=== Republican primary ===
==== Candidates ====
===== Nominee =====
- Andy Biggs, president of the Arizona Senate

===== Eliminated in primary =====
- Christine Jones, former executive vice president, general counsel and corporate secretary for GoDaddy, and candidate in the 2014 gubernatorial election (previously ran for U.S. Senate)
- Justin Olson, state representative
- Don Stapley, former Maricopa County Supervisor

===== Withdrawn =====
- Bryan Martyn, former Pinal County Supervisor and state parks director (endorsed Stapley)

===== Declined =====
- Matt Salmon, incumbent U.S. Representative

==== Endorsements ====
Andy Biggs

U.S. Senators

- Mike Lee, U.S. senator (R-UT)

U.S. Representatives

- Matt Salmon, incumbent U.S. Congressman
- Trent Franks, U.S. Congressman
- Jim Jordan, U.S. representative (OH-04) and chairman of the House Freedom Caucus
- Mark Meadows, U.S. representative (NC-11)

Organizations

- American Conservative Union
- Club for Growth
- FreedomWorks

Local officials

- Joe Arpaio, Maricopa County Sheriff
Don Stapley

State legislators

- Mark Killian, Director of Arizona Department of Agriculture & Former Speaker of the AZ House

Local officials

- John Giles, Mayor of Mesa
- Paul Petersen, Maricopa County Assessor
- Jay Tibshraeny, Mayor of Chandler
Christine Jones

Statewide officials

- Mike Huckabee, former governor of Arkansas

Organizations

- Maggie's List

Local officials

- Kevin Hartke, Chandler City Councilman
- Brigette Peterson, Gilbert Town Councilwoman
- Jorday Ray, Gilbert Town Councilwoman
- Jeff Brown, Queen Creek Town Councilman

Individuals

- Carly Fiorina, former CEO of Hewlett-Packard and 2016 Republican presidential candidate

==== Polling ====
Poll source	Date(s) administered	Sample size	Margin of error	Andy Biggs	Christine Jones	Justin Olson	Don Stapley	Undecided
OH Predictive Insights	July 19, 2016	408	± 4.84%	19%	26%	9%	15%	31%
OH Predictive Insights	June 2, 2016	462	± 4.56%	21%	7%	5%	10%	57%

==== Debate ====
2016 Arizona's 5th congressional district Republican primary debate
No.	Date	Host	Moderator	Link	Republican	Republican	Republican	Republican
Key: P Participant A Absent N Not invited I Invited W Withdrawn								
Key: P Participant A Absent N Not invited I Invited W Withdrawn					Andy Biggs	Christine Jones	Justin Olson	Don Stapley
1	Jul. 7, 2016	KAET	Ted Simons		I	P	P	P

==== Results ====
Republican primary results by precinct: Biggs: 20–30%; 30–40%; 40–50%; Jones: 20–30%; 30–40%; 40–50%; Stapley: 20–30%; 30–40%; Olson: 30–40%; 40–50%; Tie: 20–30%

Republican primary results
Party	Candidate	Votes	%
Republican	Andy Biggs	25,240	29.5
Republican	Christine Jones	25,224	29.5
Republican	Don Stapley	17,745	20.7
Republican	Justin Olson	17,386	20.3
Total votes		85,595	100.0

=== Democratic primary ===
==== Candidates ====
===== Nominee =====
- Talia Fuentes, applied biologist

===== Eliminated in primary =====
- Kinsey Remaklus, real estate investor

==== Results ====
Democratic primary results
Party	Candidate	Votes	%
Democratic	Talia Fuentes	16,408	65.5
Democratic	Kinsey Remaklus	8,663	34.5
Total votes		25,071	100.0

=== Independent ===
==== Candidates ====
- Randall Sand, small business owner
- Randall Sand is/was a fake political persona created by Jake Hoffman of Rally Forge. The fake politician persona was Randall Sand, who described himself on his campaign website as an Independent Candidate for Arizona's Fifth Congressional District. His Twitter Page similarly lists him as a "Former Independent Congressional write-in candidate." Sand's Facebook presence used a photo of film director Derrick Acosta, and posted a doctored image of a Derrick Acosta interview. The Page also shared several doctored images of news story headlines purporting to be from local press featuring Randall Sand; however, the articles do not appear to exist on the newspaper sites.

=== General election ===
==== Predictions ====
Source	Ranking	As of
The Cook Political Report	Safe R	November 7, 2016
Daily Kos Elections	Safe R	November 7, 2016
Rothenberg	Safe R	November 3, 2016
Sabato's Crystal Ball	Safe R	November 7, 2016
RCP	Safe R	October 31, 2016

==== Results ====
Arizona’s 5th congressional district, 2016
Party	Candidate	Votes	%
Republican	Andy Biggs	205,184	64.1
Democratic	Talia Fuentes	114,940	35.9
Majority		90,244	28.2
Total votes		320,124	100.0
Republican hold			

== District 6 ==
2016 Arizona's 6th congressional district election
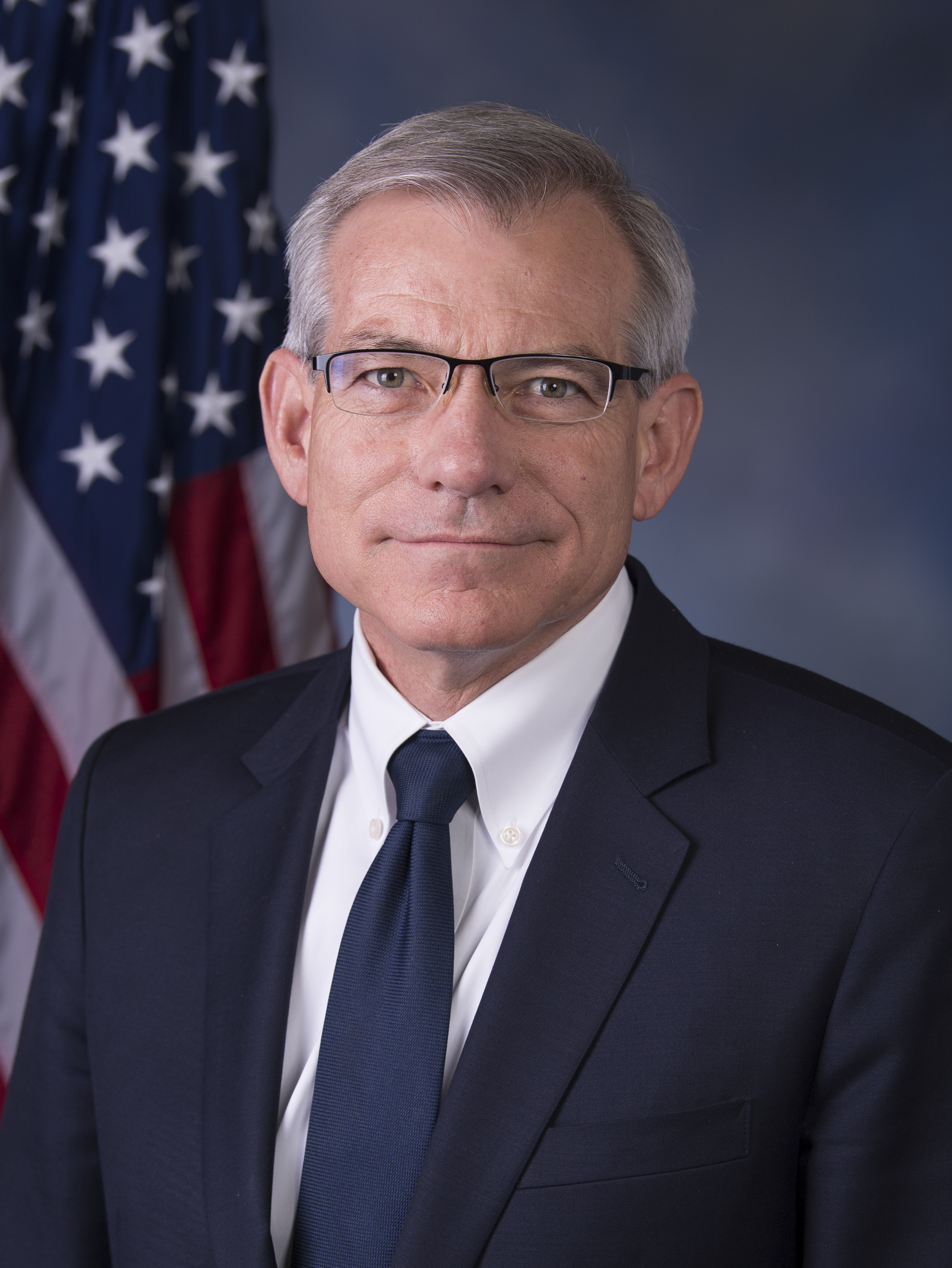

Nominee	David Schweikert	W. John Williamson
Party	Republican	Democratic
Popular vote	201,578	122,866
Percentage	62.1%	37.9%
- Precinct results Schweikert: 50–60% 60–70% 70–80% Williamson: 50–60% 60–70% No votes
U.S. Representative before election
David Schweikert
Republican
Elected U.S. Representative
David Schweikert
Republican

Incumbent Republican David Schweikert, who had represented the district since 2013, ran for re-election. He was re-elected in 2014 with 65% of the vote.

=== Republican primary ===
==== Candidates ====
===== Nominee =====
- David Schweikert, incumbent U.S. Representative

===== Eliminated in primary =====
- Russ Wittenberg

==== Results ====
Republican primary results
Party	Candidate	Votes	%
Republican	David Schweikert (incumbent)	63,378	80.3
Republican	Russ Wittenberg	15,535	19.7
Total votes		78,913	100.0

=== Democratic primary ===
==== Candidates ====
===== Nominee =====
- W. John Williamson, candidate for this seat in 2012 and nominee in 2014

===== Eliminated in primary =====
- Brian Sinuk

==== Results ====
Democratic primary results
Party	Candidate	Votes	%
Democratic	W. John Williamson	17,561	58.8
Democratic	Brian Sinuk	12,293	41.2
Total votes		29,705	100.0

=== General election ===
==== Predictions ====
Source	Ranking	As of
The Cook Political Report	Safe R	November 7, 2016
Daily Kos Elections	Safe R	November 7, 2016
Rothenberg	Safe R	November 3, 2016
Sabato's Crystal Ball	Safe R	November 7, 2016
RCP	Safe R	October 31, 2016

==== Results ====
Arizona’s 6th congressional district, 2016
Party	Candidate	Votes	%
Republican	David Schweikert (Incumbent)	201,578	62.1
Democratic	W. John Williamson	122,866	37.9
Majority		78,712	24.2
Total votes		324,444	100.0
Republican hold			

== District 7 ==
2016 Arizona's 7th congressional district election
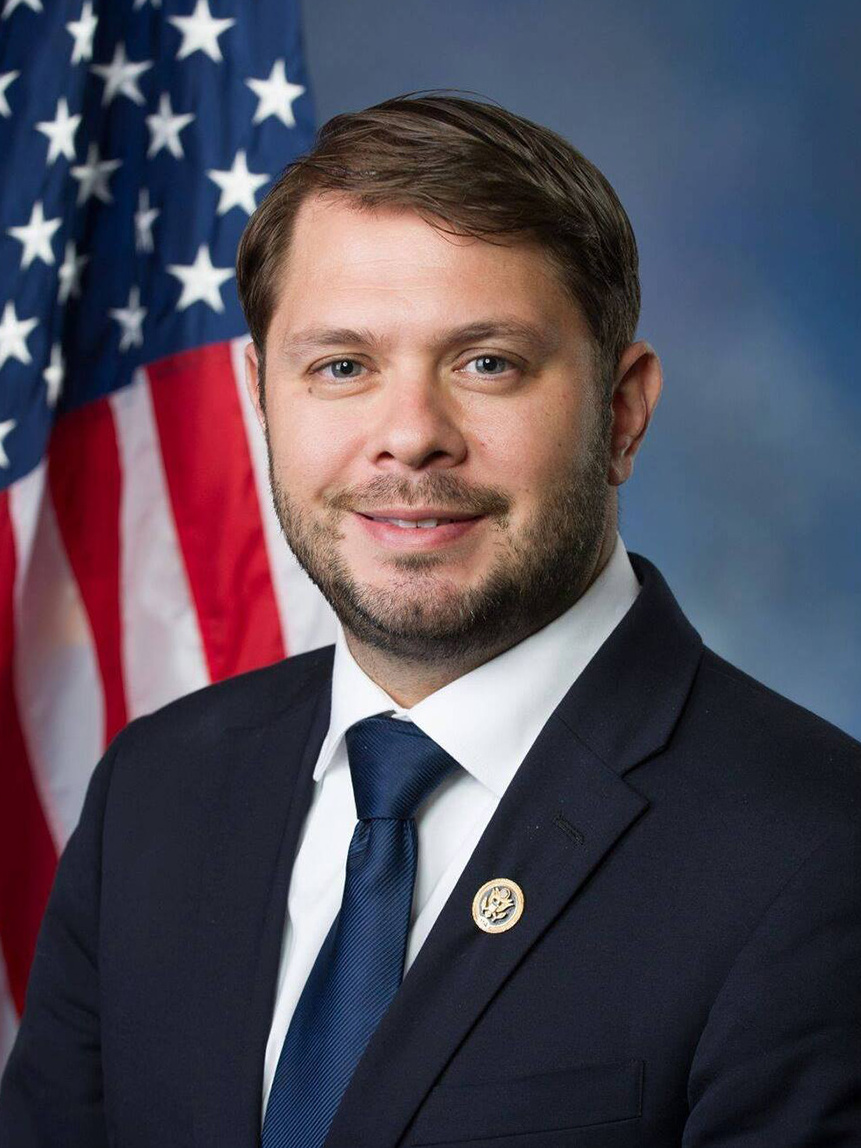

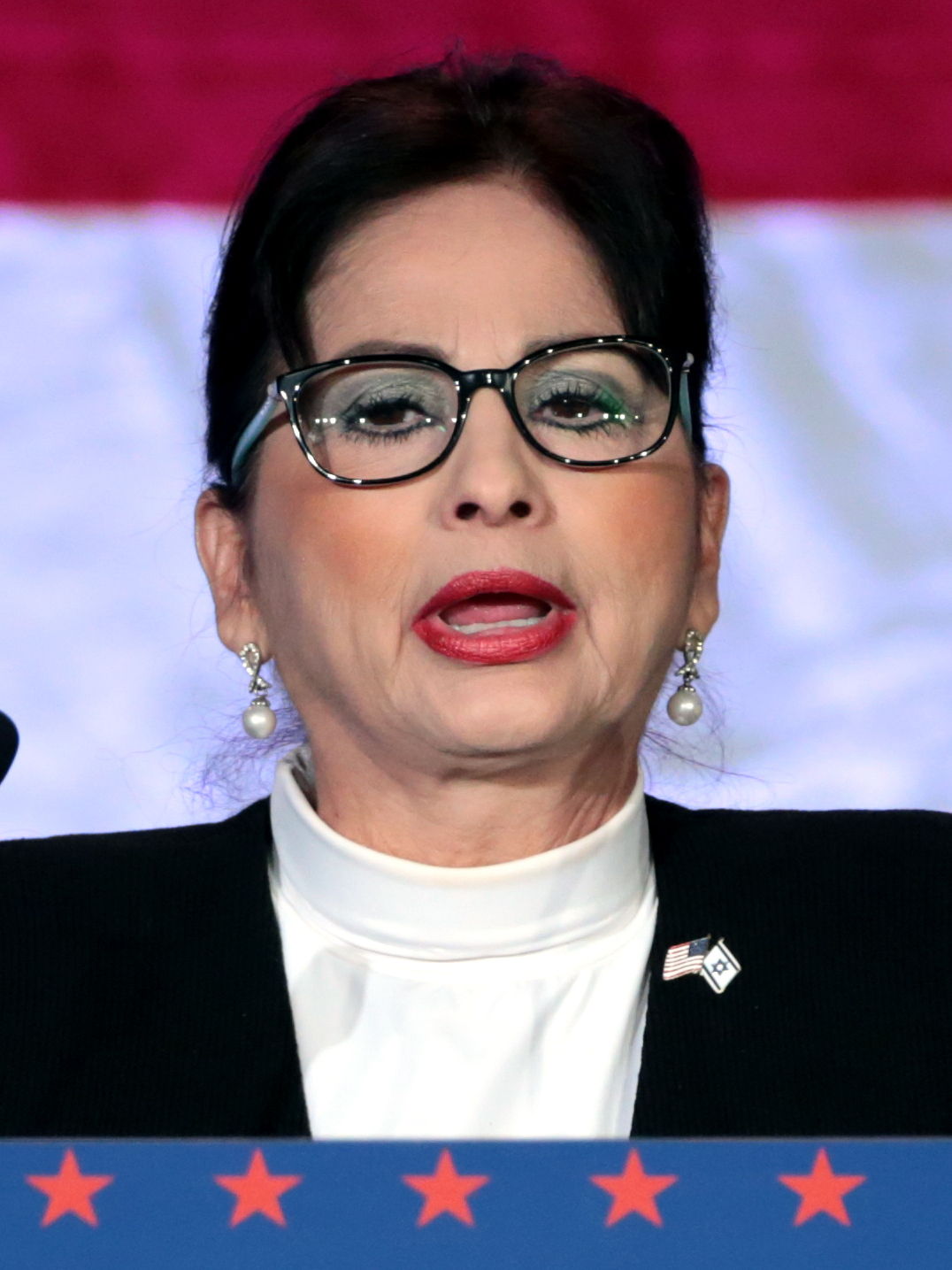
Nominee	Ruben Gallego	Eve Nunez
Party	Democratic	Republican
Popular vote	119,465	39,286
Percentage	75.3%	24.7%
- Precinct results Gallego: 50–60% 60–70% 70–80% 80–90% >90% Nunez: 60–70%
U.S. Representative before election
Ruben Gallego
Democratic
Elected U.S. Representative
Ruben Gallego
Democratic

Incumbent Democrat Ruben Gallego, who had represented the district since 2015, ran for re-election. He was first elected to this district in 2014 with 75% of the vote.

=== Democratic primary ===
==== Candidates ====
===== Nominee =====
- Ruben Gallego, incumbent U.S. Representative

==== Results ====
Democratic primary results
Party	Candidate	Votes	%
Democratic	Ruben Gallego (incumbent)	29,705	100.0
Total votes		29,705	100.0

=== Republican primary ===
==== Candidates ====
===== Nominee =====
- Eve Nunez

==== Results ====
Republican primary results
Party	Candidate	Votes	%
Republican	Eve Nunez	10,912	100.0
Total votes		10,912	100.0

=== General election ===
==== Endorsements ====
Ruben Gallego (D)

Labor unions

- AFL-CIO

==== Predictions ====
Source	Ranking	As of
The Cook Political Report	Safe D	November 7, 2016
Daily Kos Elections	Safe D	November 7, 2016
Rothenberg	Safe D	November 3, 2016
Sabato's Crystal Ball	Safe D	November 7, 2016
RCP	Safe D	October 31, 2016

==== Results ====
Arizona’s 7th congressional district, 2016
Party	Candidate	Votes	%
Democratic	Ruben Gallego (incumbent)	119,465	75.3
Republican	Eve Nunez	39,286	24.7
Green	Neil Westbrooks (write-in)	60	0.0
Total votes		158,811	100.0
Democratic hold			

== District 8 ==
2016 Arizona's 8th congressional district election
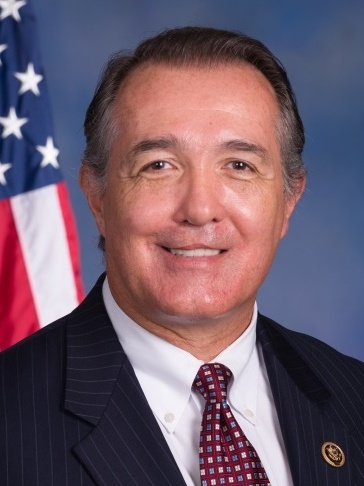

Nominee	Trent Franks	Mark Salazar
Party	Republican	Green
Popular vote	204,942	93,954
Percentage	68.5%	31.5%
- County results Franks: 60–70%
U.S. Representative before election
Trent Franks
Republican
Elected U.S. Representative
Trent Franks
Republican

Incumbent Republican Trent Franks, who had represented the district since 2003, ran for re-election. He was re-elected in 2014 with 75% of the vote.

=== Republican primary ===
==== Candidates ====
===== Nominee =====
- Trent Franks, incumbent U.S. Representative

===== Eliminated in primary =====
- Clair Van Steenwyk

==== Results ====
Republican primary results
Party	Candidate	Votes	%
Republican	Trent Franks (incumbent)	59,042	71.1
Republican	Clair Van Steenwyk	24,042	28.9
Total votes		83,084	100.0

=== Democratic primary ===
==== Candidates ====
- Joe DeVivo (write-in)

DeVivo did not receive enough write-in votes to qualify for nomination.

==== Results ====
Democratic primary results
Party	Candidate	Votes	%
Democratic	Joe DeVivo (write-in)	640	100.0
Total votes		640	100.0

=== Green Primary ===
==== Candidates ====
- Mark Salazar (write-in)

Salazar qualified by receiving enough write-in votes.

=== General election ===
==== Predictions ====
Source	Ranking	As of
The Cook Political Report	Safe R	November 7, 2016
Daily Kos Elections	Safe R	November 7, 2016
Rothenberg	Safe R	November 3, 2016
Sabato's Crystal Ball	Safe R	November 7, 2016
RCP	Safe R	October 31, 2016

==== Results ====
Arizona’s 8th congressional district, 2016
Party	Candidate	Votes	%
Republican	Trent Franks (incumbent)	204,942	68.5
Green	Mark Salazar	93,954	31.5
Republican	Hayden Keener III (write-in)	75	0.0
Total votes		298,971	100.0
Republican hold			

== District 9 ==
2016 Arizona's 9th congressional district election
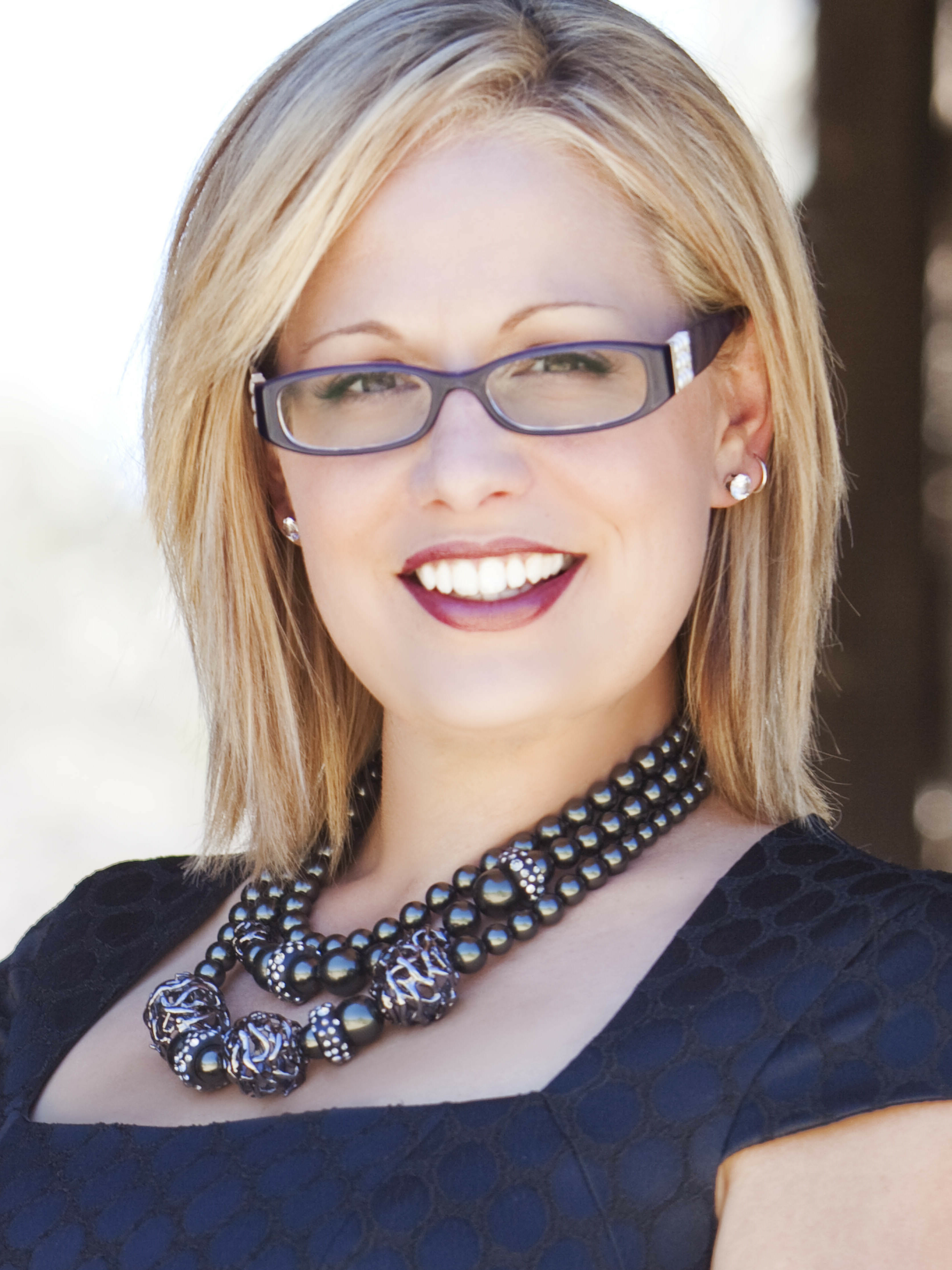

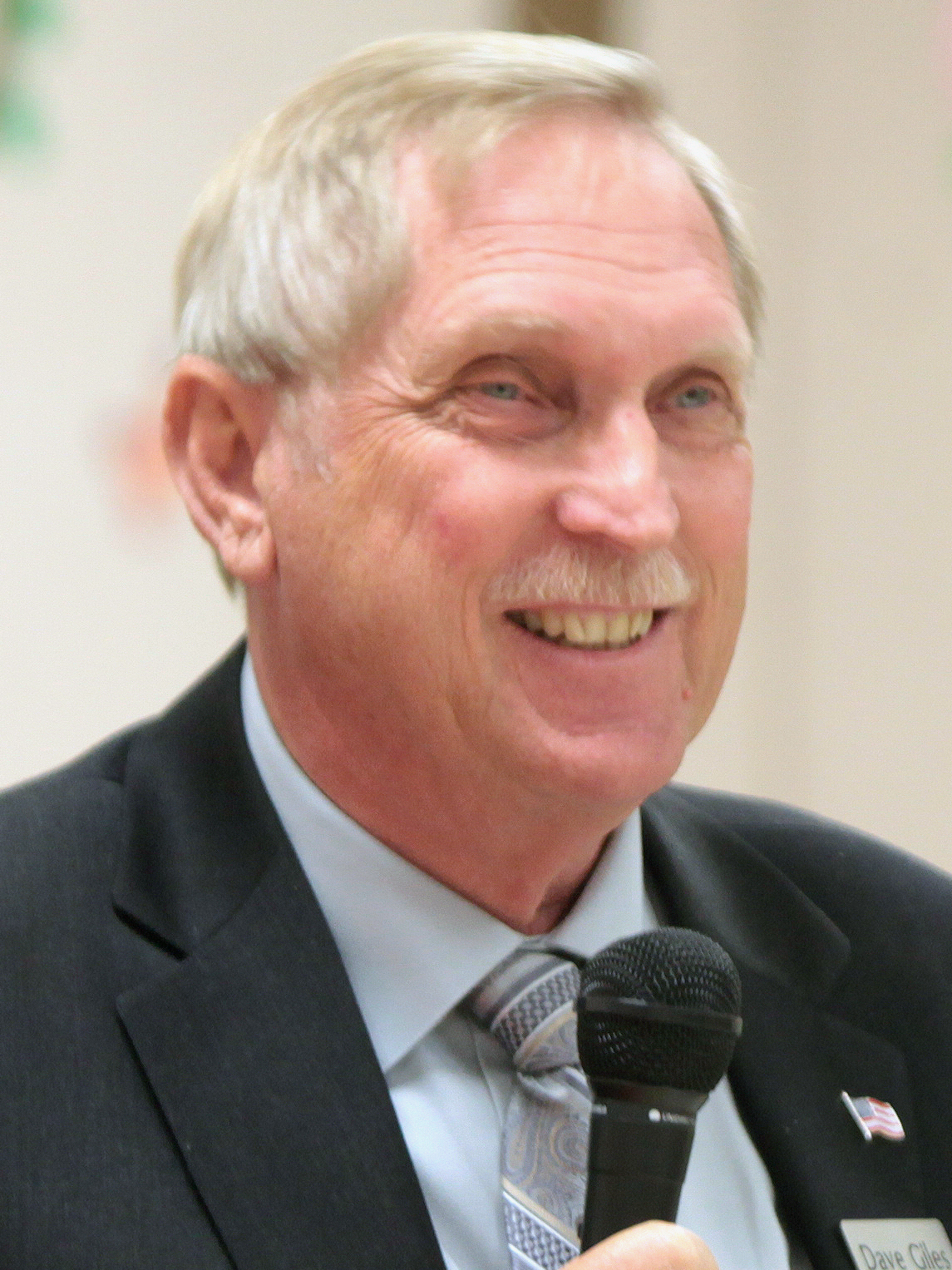
Nominee	Kyrsten Sinema	Dave Giles
Party	Democratic	Republican
Popular vote	169,055	108,350
Percentage	60.9%	39.1%
- Precinct results Sinema: 50–60% 60–70% 70–80% 80–90% Giles: 50–60%
U.S. Representative before election
Kyrsten Sinema
Democratic
Elected U.S. Representative
Kyrsten Sinema
Democratic

Incumbent Democrat Kyrsten Sinema, who had represented the district since 2013, ran for re-election.

=== Democratic primary ===
==== Candidates ====
===== Nominee =====
- Kyrsten Sinema, incumbent U.S. Representative

==== Results ====
Democratic primary results
Party	Candidate	Votes	%
Democratic	Kyrsten Sinema (incumbent)	38,948	100.0
Total votes		38,948	100.0

=== Republican primary ===
John Agra was favored to win the Republican nomination.

==== Candidates ====
===== Nominee =====
- Dave Giles, engineer and business consultant

===== Eliminated in primary =====
- John Agra, attorney

===== Withdrawn =====
- Ross Groen, retired marine. Withdrew to run for Arizona House of Representatives district 25.

==== Endorsements ====
David Giles

Newspapers

- The Arizona Republic

Local officials

- Bill Montgomery, Maricopa County Attorney

==== Results ====
Republican primary results
Party	Candidate	Votes	%
Republican	Dave Giles	25,963	60.7
Republican	John Agra	16,817	39.3
Total votes		42,780	100.0

=== General election ===
==== Endorsements ====
Kyrsten Sinema (D)

Labor unions

- AFL-CIO

Organizations

- Democratic Congressional Campaign Committee "Frontline" Program

==== Predictions ====
Source	Ranking	As of
The Cook Political Report	Safe D	November 7, 2016
Daily Kos Elections	Safe D	November 7, 2016
Rothenberg	Safe D	November 3, 2016
Sabato's Crystal Ball	Safe D	November 7, 2016
RCP	Safe D	October 31, 2016

==== Results ====
Arizona’s 9th congressional district, 2016
Party	Candidate	Votes	%
Democratic	Kyrsten Sinema (incumbent)	169,055	60.9
Republican	Dave Giles	108,350	39.1
Green	Cary Dolego (write-in)	60	0.0
Independent	Axel Bello (write-in)	46	0.0
Majority		60,705	21.8
Total votes		277,507	100.0
Democratic hold			
