= Neil Giuliano =

American mayor (born 1956)

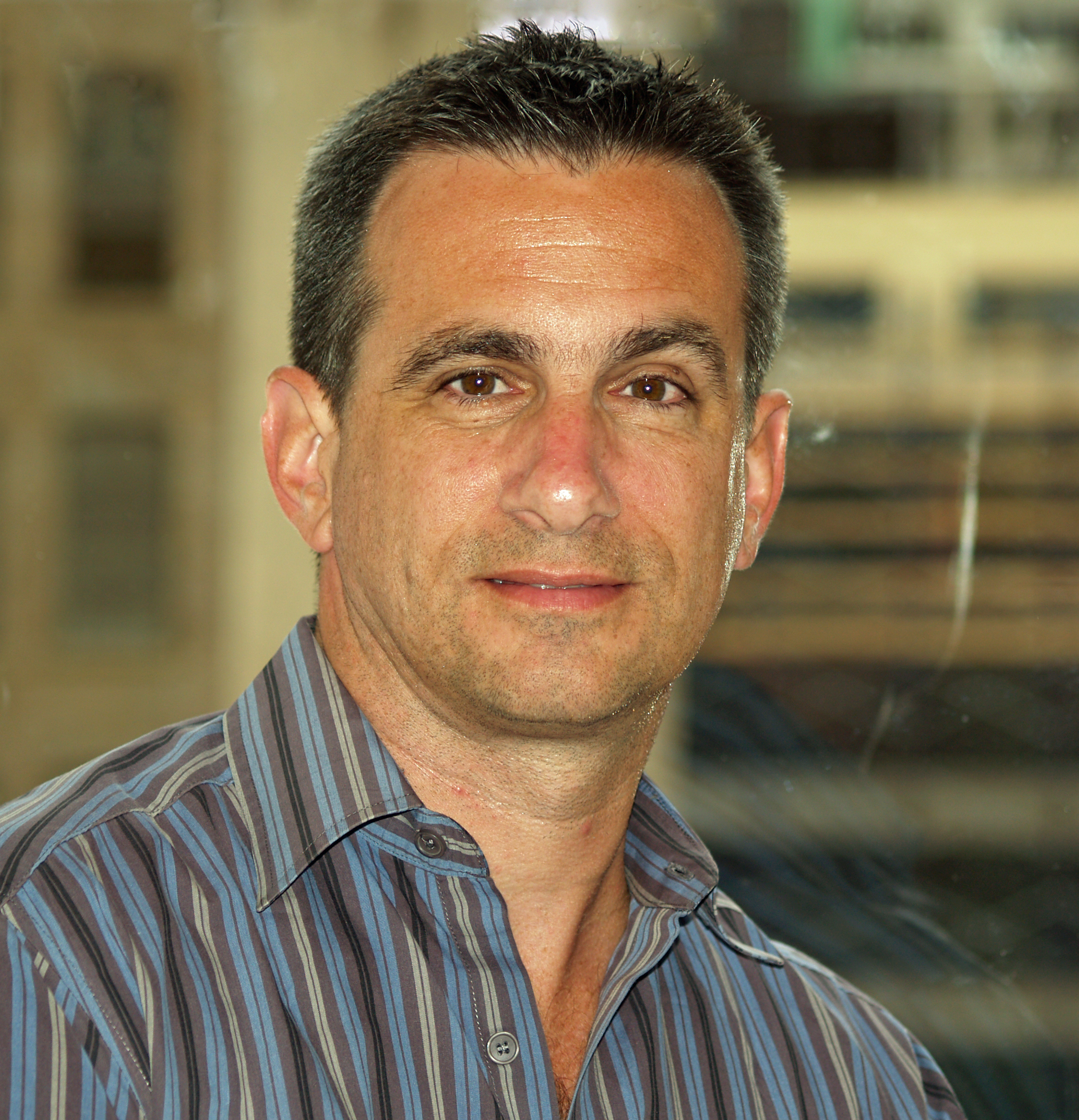

30th Mayor of Tempe
- In office July 14, 1994 – 2004
- Preceded by: Harry Mitchell
- Succeeded by: Hugh Hallman

Personal details
- Born: October 26, 1956 (age 69)
- Party: Republican (until 2008); Democratic (2008–present)
- Education: Arizona State University

Neil Gerard Giuliano (born October 26, 1956) is an American politician who served as mayor of Tempe, Arizona for four terms, from 1994 to 2004 (Three two-year terms and one four-year term). After serving in elected office he served as president of the Gay & Lesbian Alliance Against Defamation (GLAAD) from 2005 to 2009, and served as President/CEO of the San Francisco AIDS Foundation from December 2010 to December 2015. Giuliano was the first directly elected openly gay mayor in the United States, and Tempe was the largest city in America with an openly gay mayor for nearly six years, 1996- 2001.

Since January 2016 he has served as President/CEO of Greater Phoenix Leadership.

== Education ==
Giuliano attended Bloomfield High School in Bloomfield, New Jersey. While a student, he was a member of Key Club at Bloomfield High School.

Giuliano graduated with a BA degree from what is now the Hugh Downs School of Communication at Arizona State University in 1979, and received a master's degree in Higher Education Administration in 1983. While a student, he served as student body president (1982–83) as well as the 1977–78 International President of Circle K International. He worked professionally at ASU from 1981 to 2005 in numerous student affairs and university relations roles. He also taught a 3-credit hour course in Personal Leadership Development during most of his tenure at the university.

== Community service ==
He remains an active member of the Kiwanis Club of Tempe, which he joined in February 1981, and served as president of the club from 1986 to 1987. He also served as president of Tempe Leadership and on numerous non-profit boards of directors including the Tempe Community Council, Big Brothers-Big Sisters and the Friends of the Tempe Center for the Arts. He currently serves on the board of director for the Valley of the Sun United Way and was a founding member of the Friends of Tempe Center for the Arts board of directors. He currently serves on the board of directors for The Partnership for Economic Innovation, Valley of the Sun United Way and Visit Phoenix.

== Political career ==
Giuliano began his political career as a city council member, elected in May 1990, and was appointed vice-mayor of Tempe, Arizona for 1992–94. He was elected mayor of Tempe four times, serving from 1994 to 2004; the first three terms were two-years each, the fourth was for four years. After he first came out as gay in August 1996, political opponents tried to initiate a recall election to remove him from office, but that effort failed. Following a controversy over city funds being directed to the Boy Scouts of America in 2000, a successful recall effort proceeded to the ballot. The recall election was held on September 11, 2001. Giuliano won in a landslide, defeating a campaign that was called "blatantly homophobic".

He also co-chaired the planning the third debate of the 2004 United States presidential elections. Upon retiring from elected office in 2004 and a 24-year career at Arizona State University in 2005, where he served as director of federal relations among other positions, Giuliano received praise from Senator John McCain and then-Governor Janet Napolitano. In 2008, Giuliano changed his registration from the Republican Party to the Democratic Party and The Arizona Republic reported that he has considered running for governor of Arizona in 2010 as a Democrat but he declined to run. In 2014, it was again speculated that he would run for governor, but he instead endorsed Fred DuVal for the Democratic nomination.

== GLAAD ==
Giuliano served as president of the Gay & Lesbian Alliance Against Defamation (GLAAD), a national LGBT organization dedicated to ensuring fair, accurate and inclusive representation of LGBTQ people and events in the media, from 2005 to 2009. He initiated LGBTQ media advocacy programs and awareness in the areas of sports, advertising and religion/faith/values, helping bridge the divide about LGBTQ issues in these critical communities. During his tenure the GLAAD Media Awards were first broadcast on the BRAVO Network, reaching over 80 million homes with LGBTQ affirming messages.

Giuliano was featured on CBS Sunday Morning in 1999 and has appeared on CNN, ABC World News Tonight, Showbiz Tonight, and Access Hollywood. He has been quoted in Newsweek, TIME, USA Today and numerous state and regional media outlets discussing LGBTQ images in the media and issues as well as the state of HIV/AIDS in the United States.

== Awards and recognition ==
Giuliano was named one of the Top 25 of 2005 by Instinct Magazine. In 2004, he received the Individual Achievement Award from the Arizona Human Rights Fund. He was named to the OUT 100 by OUT Magazine, which notes the top 100 people in gay culture in the US. While he was mayor in 2003, Tempe was named an "All American-City," an award honoring local governments demonstrating success in problem solving. He was named Tempe Humanitarian of the year in 2014 and among the Most Admired Leaders of the Phoenix region in 2017 by the Phoenix Business Journal. In 2018 he received the highest recognition for leadership and community service when selected as the 69th Man of the Year. Former US Senator Barry Goldwater was the first recipient of the award in 1949.

Giuliano is the author of The Campaign Within: A Mayor's Private Journey to Public Leadership.
