= Arizona Law =

Arizona Law may refer to:

- The University of Arizona College of Law
- The law of Arizona
