= 2014 Arizona gubernatorial election =

- November 4, 2014
- Turnout: 47.52% ▼8.13pp
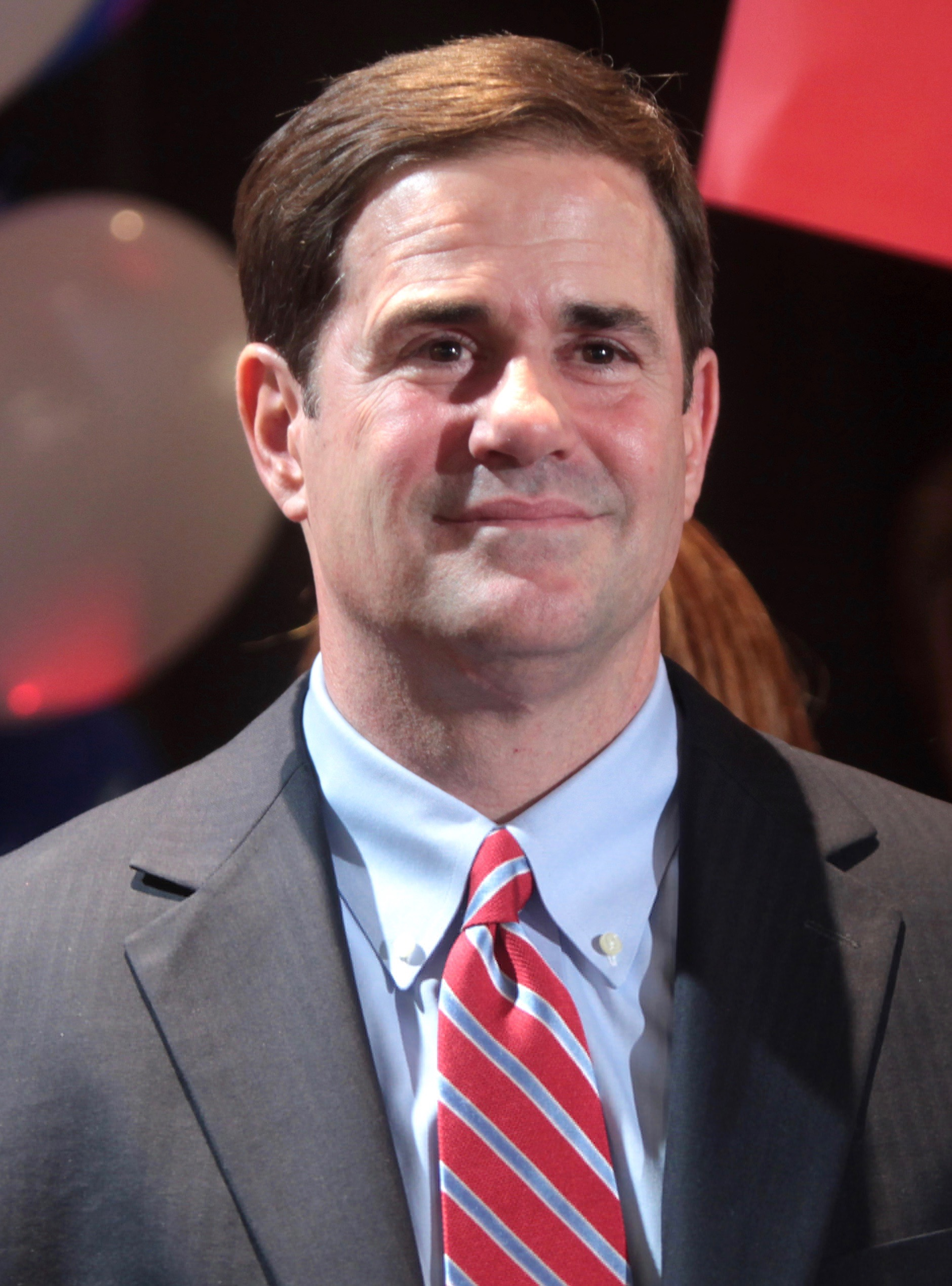

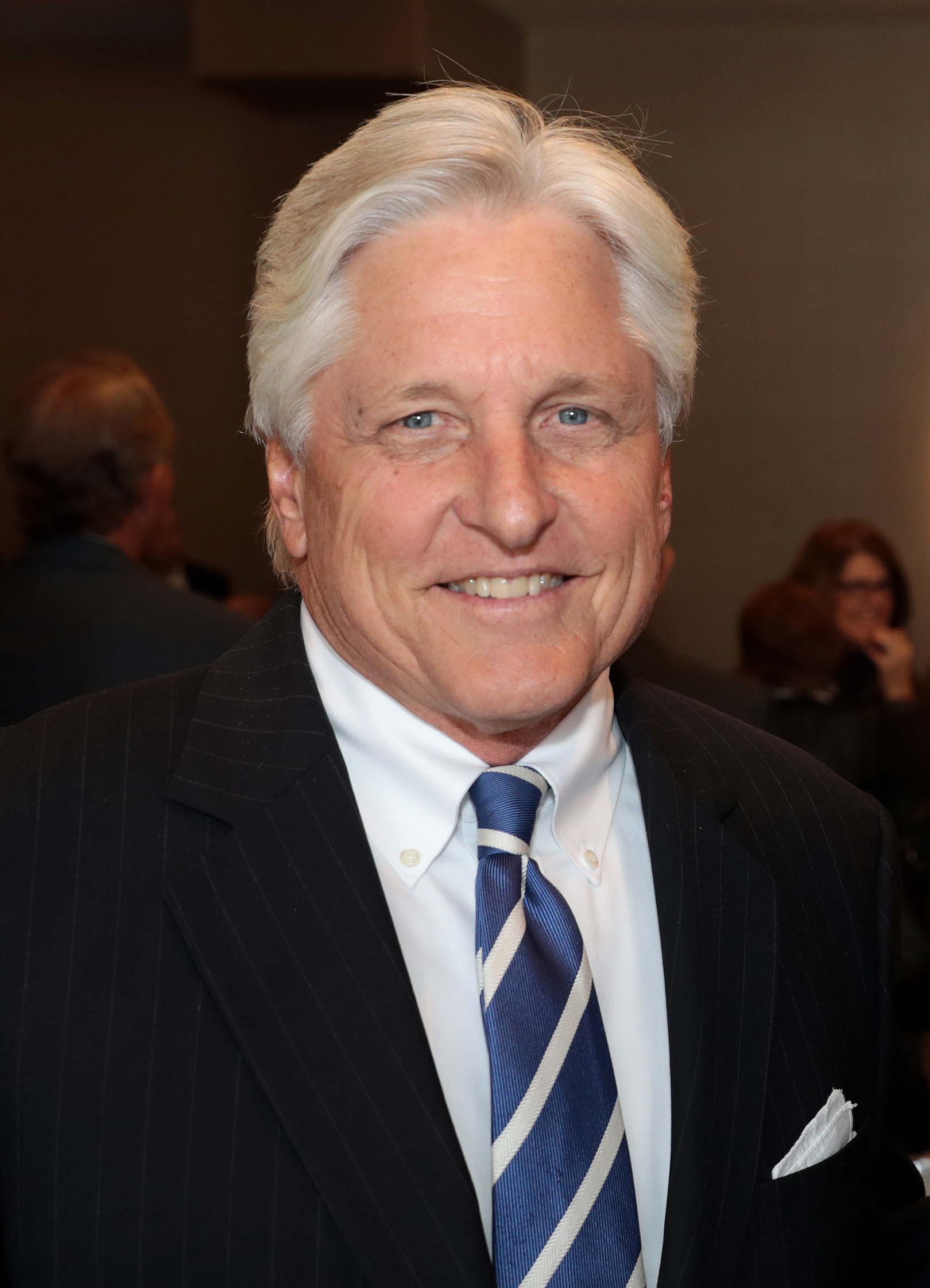
Nominee	Doug Ducey	Fred DuVal
Party	Republican	Democratic
Popular vote	805,062	626,921
Percentage	53.44%	41.62%
- Ducey: 40–50% 50–60% 60–70% 70–80% 80–90% >90% DuVal: 40–50% 50–60% 60–70% 70–80% 80–90% >90% No data
Governor before election
Jan Brewer
Republican
Elected Governor
Doug Ducey
Republican

The 2014 Arizona gubernatorial election was held on November 4, 2014, to elect the governor of Arizona, concurrently with elections to the United States Senate in other states and elections to the United States House of Representatives and various state and local elections.

Incumbent Republican Governor Jan Brewer was term-limited and could not run for a second consecutive full term in office. After a competitive six-candidate primary, Republicans nominated Arizona State Treasurer Doug Ducey. Democrat Fred DuVal, the former chair of the Arizona Board of Regents, won his party's nomination unopposed. Ducey won the election with 53% of the vote.

== Background ==
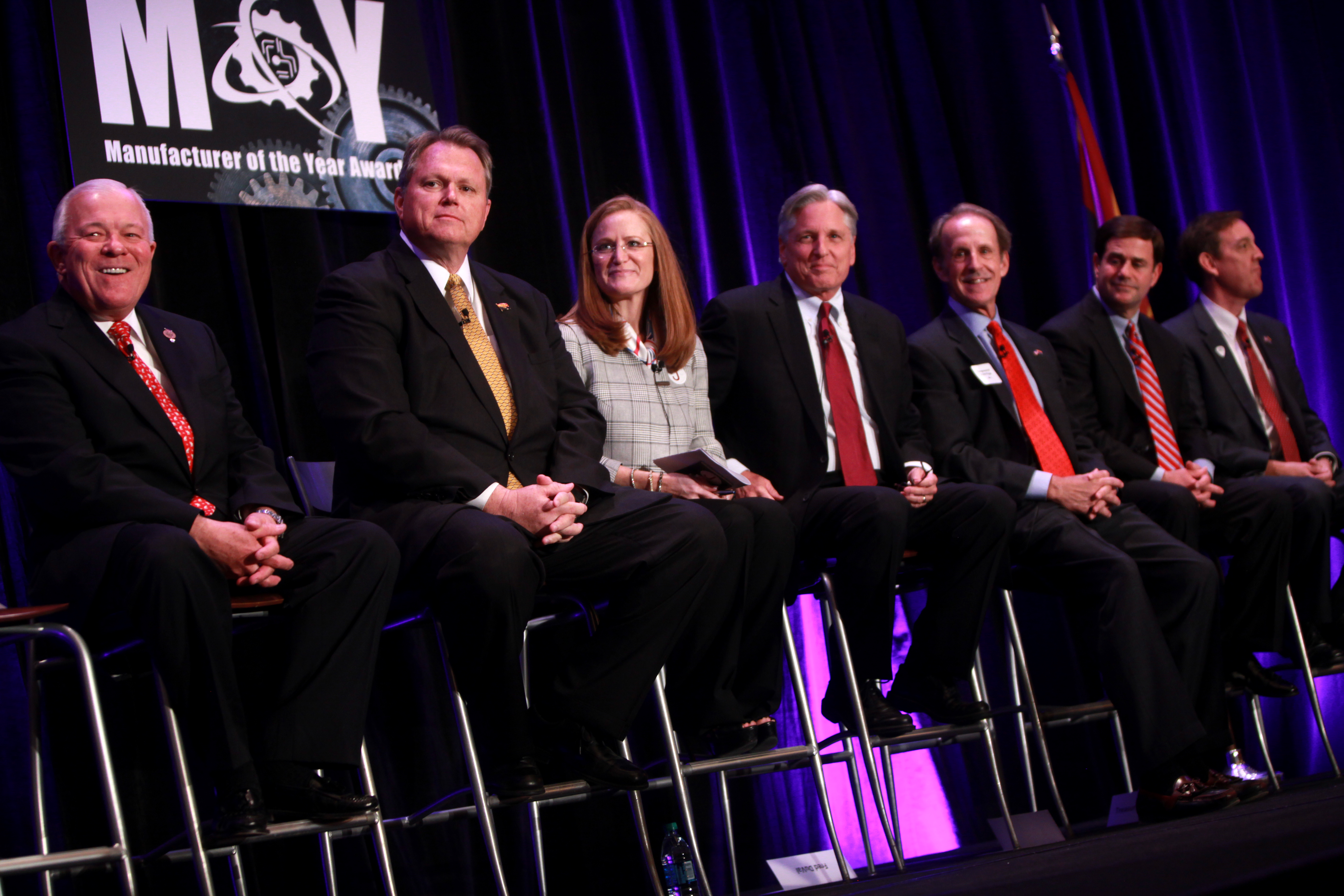
Candidates for governor speaking at a forum hosted by the Arizona Chamber of Commerce and Industry. From left to right: Al Melvin, Scott Smith, Christine Jones, Fred DuVal, Frank Riggs, Doug Ducey and Ken Bennett.

Democratic governor Janet Napolitano resigned on January 21, 2009, to be sworn in as Secretary of the Department of Homeland Security. Since Arizona did not have a lieutenant governor at the time, Secretary of State Jan Brewer was first in the state's gubernatorial line of succession and was sworn in as governor on the same day. She was elected to a full term in 2010, defeating Democrat Terry Goddard, the Arizona Attorney General, by 54% to 42%.

Brewer was term-limited in 2014, despite only serving one full term. This is because Arizona state law limits office holders to two consecutive terms regardless of whether they serve full or partial terms. In November 2012, Brewer declared she was looking into what she called "ambiguity" in Arizona's term-limit law to seek a third term. In February 2014, Brewer reiterated that she was considering running for re-election, but on March 12, 2014, she announced that she would not attempt to seek another term in office, which would have required what The Arizona Republic called a "long-shot court challenge".

== Republican primary ==
The Republican primary campaign was widely characterised as being "bitter" and "nasty" and the $16.2 million spent by the six Republican candidates means that the 2014 election has already broken the record for most expensive gubernatorial race in state history, exceeding the 2002 election in which $9.2 million was spent during the primary and general election campaigns combined.

=== Candidates ===
==== Declared ====
- Ken Bennett, Secretary of State of Arizona
- Doug Ducey, State Treasurer of Arizona
- Christine Jones, former executive vice president, General Counsel and corporate secretary for Go Daddy
- Frank Riggs, former U.S. representative from California and candidate for the U.S. Senate from California in 1998
- Scott Smith, Mayor of Mesa
- Andrew Thomas, former county attorney of Maricopa County, disbarred lawyer, and candidate for Arizona Attorney General in 2010

==== Withdrew ====
- Hugh Hallman, former mayor of Tempe (ran for state treasurer and lost)
- Al Melvin, state senator
- John Molina, OB/GYN and former CEO of Phoenix Indian Medical Center

==== Declined ====
- Joe Arpaio, Sheriff of Maricopa County
- Jan Brewer, incumbent governor
- Brenda Burns, Corporation Commissioner
- Wil Cardon, businessman and candidate for the U.S. Senate in 2012 (ran for Secretary of State and lost)
- Tom Horne, Attorney General of Arizona (ran for re-election and lost)
- Martha McSally, retired United States Air Force colonel and nominee for Arizona's 2nd congressional district in 2012 (ran for AZ-02 and won)
- Steve Pierce, state senator
- Steven Seagal, actor and reserve deputy sheriff

=== Endorsements ===
Doug Ducey

Individuals

- Joe Arpaio, Sheriff of Maricopa County (1993-2017)
- Steve Chucri, Maricopa County Supervisor and president/CEO of the Arizona Restaurant Association
- Jerry Colangelo, businessman and former owner of the Phoenix Suns and Arizona Diamondbacks
- Sal DiCiccio, Phoenix City Councilman (2009-2023)
- Trent Franks, U.S. representative of Arizona's 8th congressional district (2003-2017)
- Barry Goldwater, Jr., former U.S. representative of California's 20th congressional district (1969-1983)
- Hugh Hewitt, former Deputy Director of the OPM (1988-1989), talk radio host (1991-present)
- Jon Kyl, former U.S. senator from Arizona (1995-2013) and former U.S. representative for Arizona's 4th congressional district (1987-1995)
- Bill Montgomery, Maricopa County Attorney (2010-2019)
- John Shadegg, former U.S. representative for Arizona's 3rd congressional district (1995-2011)
- Fife Symington, 19th Governor of Arizona (1991-1997)

Organizations

- Arizona Free Enterprise Club
- Arizona Right to Life
Frank Riggs

Individuals

- Russell Pearce, former president of the Arizona Senate (2011) from the 18th district (2008-2011)
- Rick Santorum, former U.S. senator from Pennsylvania (1995-2007) and candidate for president in 2012

Organizations

- Arizonans Against Common Core
Scott Smith

Individuals

- Jan Brewer, incumbent governor

=== Polling ===
Poll source	Date(s) administered	Sample size	Margin of error	Ken Bennett	Doug Ducey	Christine Jones	Al Melvin	John Molina	Frank Riggs	Scott Smith	Andrew Thomas	Undecided
Magellan Strategies	August 17–21, 2014	1,281	± 2.74%	12%	32%	18%	—	—	2%	21%	8%	7%
Harper Polling	August 19–20, 2014	812	± 3.44%	14%	32%	16%	—	—	2%	19%	7%	10%
Remington	August 17–19, 2014	502	± 4.37%	10%	33%	18%	—	—	1%	22%	11%	5%
Magellan Strategies	August 15–18, 2014	1,322	± ?	12%	31%	17%	—	—	3%	22%	8%	7%
Magellan Strategies	August 12–15, 2014	1,300	± ?	10%	31%	16%	—	—	3%	23%	7%	10%
Magellan Strategies	August 5–7, 2014	1,289	± 2.73%	11%	29%	13%	—	—	4%	22%	9%	12%
Magellan Strategies	July 28–31, 2014	1,644	± ?	12%	23%	13%	—	—	5%	21%	10%	16%
Undisclosed	Late July 2014	?	± ?	10%	23%	20%	—	—	2%	15%	9%	21%
Harper Polling	July 16–17, 2014	885	± 3.29%	12%	23%	21%	—	—	1%	13%	7%	22%
Behavior Research Center	July 10–17, 2014	459	± 4.7%	10%	13%	17%	—	—	2%	8%	0%	50%
Gravis Marketing	July 14, 2014	691	± 4%	7%	28%	19%	—	—	1%	14%	8%	24%
Highground	July 10–12, 2014	400	± 4.9%	3.5%	17.3%	15.3%	—	—	1.5%	9.8%	3%	49.8%
Magellan Strategies	July 9–10, 2014	593	± 4.02%	11%	26%	22%	—	—	2%	14%	6%	19%
Harper Polling	June 25–26, 2014	791	± 3.48%	12%	33%	15%	—	—	2%	14%	3%	22%
McLaughlin & Associates	June 10, 2014	400	± 3.48%	8%	22.8%	6.2%	—	—	—	6.5%	—	56.5%
Magellan Strategies	June 3–4, 2014	630	± 3.9%	12%	28%	12%	2%	—	2%	16%	5%	23%
Magellan Strategies	May 13–14, 2014	760	± 3.6%	12.7%	27.3%	11.9%	1.3%	0.2%	0.7%	11.5%	5.6%	28.8%
Undisclosed	April 29, 2014	1,367	± 3.5%	7%	4%	10%	—	—	—	9%	5%	65%
Magellan Strategies	April 8–9, 2014	?	± ?	15%	9%	14%	—	—	1%	6%	6%	45%
Public Policy Polling	Feb. 28–Mar. 2, 2014	403	± 4.9%	20%	6%	16%	1%	1%	1%	12%	9%	34%
Behavior Research Center	January 16–26, 2014	701	± 3.8%	6%	2%	8%	1%	—	—	7%	7%	69%
Susquehanna	Nov. 27–Dec. 4 2013	245	± ?	20%	8%	4%	2%	—	—	6%	4%	56%

=== Debate ===
2014 Arizona gubernatorial election republican primary debates
No.	Date	Host	Moderator	Link	Republican	Republican	Republican	Republican	Republican	Republican
Key: P Participant A Absent N Not invited I Invited W Withdrawn										
Key: P Participant A Absent N Not invited I Invited W Withdrawn					Ken Bennett	Doug Ducey	Christine Jones	Frank Riggs	Scott Smith	Andrew Thomas
1	Jul. 20, 2014	Arizona PBS	Ted Simons	PBS	P	P	P	P	P	P

=== Results ===
Results by county: Ducey – 50–60% Ducey – 40–50% Ducey – 30–40% Jones – 30–40%

Republican primary results
Party	Candidate	Votes	%
Republican	Doug Ducey	200,607	37.05
Republican	Scott Smith	119,107	22.00
Republican	Christine Jones	89,922	16.61
Republican	Ken Bennett	62,010	11.45
Republican	Andrew Thomas	43,822	8.09
Republican	Frank Riggs	24,168	4.46
Republican	Write-in	1,804	0.03
Total votes		541,440	100

== Democratic primary ==
=== Candidates ===
==== Declared ====
- Fred DuVal, former chairman of the Arizona Board of Regents

==== Withdrew ====
- Ronald Cavanaugh, Libertarian candidate for governor in 2010

==== Declined ====
- Chad Campbell, Minority Leader of the Arizona House of Representatives
- Richard Carmona, former Surgeon General and nominee for the U.S. Senate in 2012
- Neil Giuliano, former mayor of Tempe
- Terry Goddard, former Arizona Attorney General, candidate for governor in 1994 and nominee for governor in 1990 and 2010 (ran for Secretary of State and lost)
- Marco A. López Jr., former chief of staff for the U.S. Customs and Border Protection and former mayor of Nogales
- Janet Napolitano, president of the University of California, former secretary of the Department of Homeland Security and former governor of Arizona
- Felecia Rotellini, attorney and nominee for Arizona Attorney General in 2010 (ran for Attorney General and lost)
- Greg Stanton, Mayor of Phoenix

=== Endorsements ===
Fred DuVal
- Bruce Babbitt, former governor of Arizona and former United States Secretary of the Interior
- Raúl Héctor Castro, former governor of Arizona and former United States Ambassador to El Salvador, Bolivia and Argentina
- Sam Coppersmith, former U.S. representative and former chairman of the Arizona Democratic Party
- Karan English, former U.S. representative
- Gabby Giffords, former U.S. representative
- Neil Giuliano, former mayor of Tempe
- Phil Gordon, former mayor of Phoenix
- Raúl Grijalva, U.S. representative
- Mark Kelly, astronaut
- Harry Mitchell, former U.S. representative, former chair of the Arizona Democratic Party and former mayor of Tempe
- Rose Mofford, former governor of Arizona
- Ed Pastor, U.S. representative
- Jim Pederson, businessman, former chairman of the Arizona Democratic Party and nominee for U.S. Senate in 2006

=== Polling ===
Hypothetical polling

Poll source	Date(s) administered	Sample size	Margin of error	Ron Cavanaugh	Fred DuVal	Undecided
Behavior Research Center	January 16–26, 2014	?	± ?	12%	18%	72%

Poll source	Date(s) administered	Sample size	Margin of error	Chad Campbell	Fred DuVal	Undecided
Myers Research	May 22–June 13, 2012	?	± ?	31%	18%	51%

=== Results ===
Democratic primary results
Party	Candidate	Votes	%
Democratic	Fred DuVal	271,276	97
Democratic	Write-in	8,578	3
Total votes		279,854	100

== Third parties ==
=== Candidates ===
==== Declared ====
- Brian Bailey (independent write-in candidate), Arizona Army National Guardsman
- Cary Dolego (independent), write-in candidate for governor in 2010
- Barry Hess (Libertarian Party), perennial candidate
- Joseph James "J." Johnson (unaffiliated write-in candidate), food account manager and brother of Eddie Johnson
- John Lewis Mealer (Americans Elect), candidate for the Americans Elect nomination for president in 2012
- Alice Novoa (Republican write-in candidate)
- Diana-Elizabeth Ramseys Rasmussen Kennedy (Independent write-in candidate)
- Curtis Woolsey (unaffiliated write-in candidate)

=== Results ===
Libertarian primary results
Party	Candidate	Votes	%
Libertarian	Barry Hess	3,979	75
Libertarian	Write-in	1,345	25
Total votes		5,324	100

Americans Elect primary results
Party	Candidate	Votes	%
Americans Elect	John Lewis Mealer	722	95
Americans Elect	Write-in	38	5
Total votes		760	100

== General election ==
=== Debates ===
2014 Arizona gubernatorial election debates
No.	Date	Host	Moderator	Link	Republican	Democratic	Libertarian	Americans Elect
Key: P Participant A Absent N Not invited I Invited W Withdrawn								
Key: P Participant A Absent N Not invited I Invited W Withdrawn					Doug Ducey	Fred DuVal	Barry Hess	John Lewis Mealer
1	Sep. 10, 2014	Chandler Center for the Arts; KPNX	Brahm Resnik	C-SPAN	P	P	N	N
2	Sep. 28, 2014	Arizona PBS	Ted Simons	PBS	P	P	P	P

=== Predictions ===
Source	Ranking	As of
The Cook Political Report	Lean R	November 3, 2014
Sabato's Crystal Ball	Likely R	November 3, 2014
Rothenberg Political Report	Lean R	November 3, 2014
Real Clear Politics	Lean R	November 3, 2014

=== Polling ===
Poll source	Date(s) administered	Sample size	Margin of error	Doug Ducey (R)	Fred DuVal (D)	Other	Undecided
CBS News/NYT/YouGov	October 16–23, 2014	2,621	± 4%	50%	40%	1%	9%
The Polling Company	October 20–22, 2014	601	± 4%	42%	35%	7% (Note: Barry Hess (L))	15%
Rasmussen Reports	October 14–16, 2014	1,056	± 3%	47%	42%	3%	7%
Tarrance Group	October 13–16, 2014	500	± 4.5%	43%	36%	5%	16%
McLaughlin & Associates	October 12–14, 2014	500	± 4.5%	37%	36%	5% (Note: Barry Hess (L) 3%, John Lewis Mealer (AE) 3%)	22%
Adrian Gray Consulting	October 8–9, 2014	600	± 4%	43%	35%	8% (Note: Barry Hess (L) 5%, John Lewis Mealer (AE) 3%)	14%
Moore Information	October 7–8, 2014	400	± ≈4.9%	36%	39%	4% (Note: Barry Hess (L) 3%, John Lewis Mealer (AE) 1%)	21%
The Polling Company	October 6–8, 2014	600	± 4%	46%	37%	5%	11%
CBS News/NYT/YouGov	September 20–October 1, 2014	2,808	± 3%	50%	39%	2%	9%
Keating Research	September 17–19, 2014	600	± 4%	41%	39%	7%	13%
Tarrance Group	September 15–17, 2014	505	± 4.5%	44%	38%	7% (Note: Barry Hess (L) 6%, John Lewis Mealer (AE) 1%)	11%
CBS News/NYT/YouGov	August 18–September 2, 2014	3,289	± 3%	39%	38%	15%	9%
Rasmussen Reports	August 27–28, 2014	850	± 3%	40%	40%	—	20%
Public Policy Polling	August 24–25, 2014	588	± 4%	35%	35%	12%	18%
Public Policy Polling	February 28–March 2, 2014	870	± 3.3%	35%	36%	—	29%
Undisclosed	February 2014	500	± ?	32%	32%	6%	30%
Behavior Research Center	January 16–26, 2014	701	± 3.8%	21%	23%	—	56%
Susquehanna	November 27–December 4, 2013	600	± 4%	36%	33%	—	31%

Hypothetical polling

With Bennett

Poll source	Date(s) administered	Sample size	Margin of error	Ken Bennett (R)	Fred DuVal (D)	Other	Undecided
Public Policy Polling	February 28–March 2, 2014	870	± 3.3%	37%	33%	—	30%
Behavior Research Center	January 16–26, 2014	701	± 3.8%	26%	22%	—	52%
Susquehanna	November 27–December 4, 2013	600	± 4%	38%	33%	—	28%

With Jones

Poll source	Date(s) administered	Sample size	Margin of error	Christine Jones (R)	Fred DuVal (D)	Other	Undecided
CBS News/NYT/YouGov	July 5–24, 2014	3,778	± ?	45%	34%	13%	7%
Public Policy Polling	February 28–March 2, 2014	870	± 3.3%	33%	37%	—	30%

With Melvin

Poll source	Date(s) administered	Sample size	Margin of error	Al Melvin (R)	Fred DuVal (D)	Other	Undecided
Public Policy Polling	February 28–March 2, 2014	870	± 3.3%	32%	37%	—	31%

With Molina

Poll source	Date(s) administered	Sample size	Margin of error	John Molina (R)	Fred DuVal (D)	Other	Undecided
Public Policy Polling	February 28–March 2, 2014	870	± 3.3%	32%	35%	—	33%

With Riggs

Poll source	Date(s) administered	Sample size	Margin of error	Frank Riggs (R)	Fred DuVal (D)	Other	Undecided
Public Policy Polling	February 28–March 2, 2014	870	± 3.3%	32%	36%	—	31%

With Smith

Poll source	Date(s) administered	Sample size	Margin of error	Scott Smith (R)	Fred DuVal (D)	Other	Undecided
Public Policy Polling	February 28–March 2, 2014	870	± 3.3%	39%	33%	—	28%
Behavior Research Center	January 16–26, 2014	701	± 3.8%	20%	23%	—	57%

With Thomas

Poll source	Date(s) administered	Sample size	Margin of error	Andrew Thomas (R)	Fred DuVal (D)	Other	Undecided
Public Policy Polling	February 28–March 2, 2014	870	± 3.3%	35%	40%	—	25%

=== Results ===
Arizona gubernatorial election, 2014
Party	Candidate	Votes	%	±%
Republican	Doug Ducey	805,062	53.44%	−1.00
Democratic	Fred DuVal	626,921	41.62%	−0.81
Libertarian	Barry Hess	57,337	3.81%	+1.61
Americans Elect	John Lewis Mealer	15,432	1.02%	N/A
None	Write-in	1,664	0.11%	N/A
Total votes		1,506,416	100.00%	
Republican hold				

==== By county ====
County	Doug Ducey Republican		Fred DuVal Democratic		Barry Hess Libertarian		John L. Mealer Americans Elect		Write-in		Margin		Total votes
County	#	%	#	%	#	%	#	%	#	%	#	%	Total votes
Apache	5,871	28.52	13,562	65.88	684	3.32	458	2.22	9	0.04	-7,691	-37.36	20,584
Cochise	21,662	59.41	12,709	34.85	1,611	4.41	457	1.25	22	0.06	8,953	24.56	36,461
Coconino	14,528	39.64	20,212	55.15	1,650	4.50	496	1.35	53	0.01	-5,684	-15.51	36,645
Gila	9,610	60.67	5,253	33.16	769	5.34	202	1.27	5	0.03	4,357	27.51	15,839
Graham	4,985	68.60	1,919	26.41	269	3.70	90	1.23	3	0.04	3,066	42.19	7,266
Greenlee	995	51.82	792	41.25	104	5.41	29	1.51	1	0.05	203	10.57	1,920
La Paz	2,388	68.54	846	24.28	195	5.59	53	1.52	2	0.05	1,542	44.26	3,484
Maricopa	469,200	54.69	346,879	40.43	32,466	3.78	8,167	0.95	1,066	0.01	122,321	14.26	857,778
Mohave	33,150	71.02	10,662	22.84	2,242	4.80	604	1.29	17	0.03	22,488	48.18	46,675
Navajo	13,569	49.61	12,128	44.34	1080	3.94	553	2.02	19	0.06	1,441	5.27	27,349
Pima	122,966	45.43	136,302	50.35	8,899	3.28	2,312	0.85	191	0.07	-13,336	-4.92	270,670
Pinal	41,313	57.80	26,131	36.56	2,966	4.14	832	1.16	231	0.32	15,182	21.24	71,473
Santa Cruz	3,175	34.05	5,819	62.40	239	2.56	90	0.96	1	0.01	-2,644	-28.35	9,324
Yavapai	46,806	63.11	23,210	31.29	3,287	4.43	820	1.10	31	0.04	23,596	31.82	74,154
Yuma	14,844	56.01	10,497	39.61	876	3.30	269	1.01	13	0.04	4,347	16.40	26,499
Totals	805,062	53.44	626,921	41.61	57,337	3.80	15,432	1.02	1,664	0.11	178,141	11.83	1,506,416

==== By congressional district ====
Ducey won six of nine congressional districts, including one that elected a Democrat.

District	DuVal	Ducey	Representative
1st	46.0%	48.87%	Ann Kirkpatrick
2nd	46.95%	48.73%	Martha McSally
3rd	56.31%	38.77%	Raúl Grijalva
4th	27.43%	66.84%	Paul Gosar
5th	32.64%	62.83%	Matt Salmon
6th	37.56%	58.27%	David Schweikert
7th	65.18%	29.29%	Ruben Gallego
8th	33.64%	61.2%	Trent Franks
9th	49.06%	46.3%	Kyrsten Sinema
