= Fred DuVal =

American businessman (born 1954)

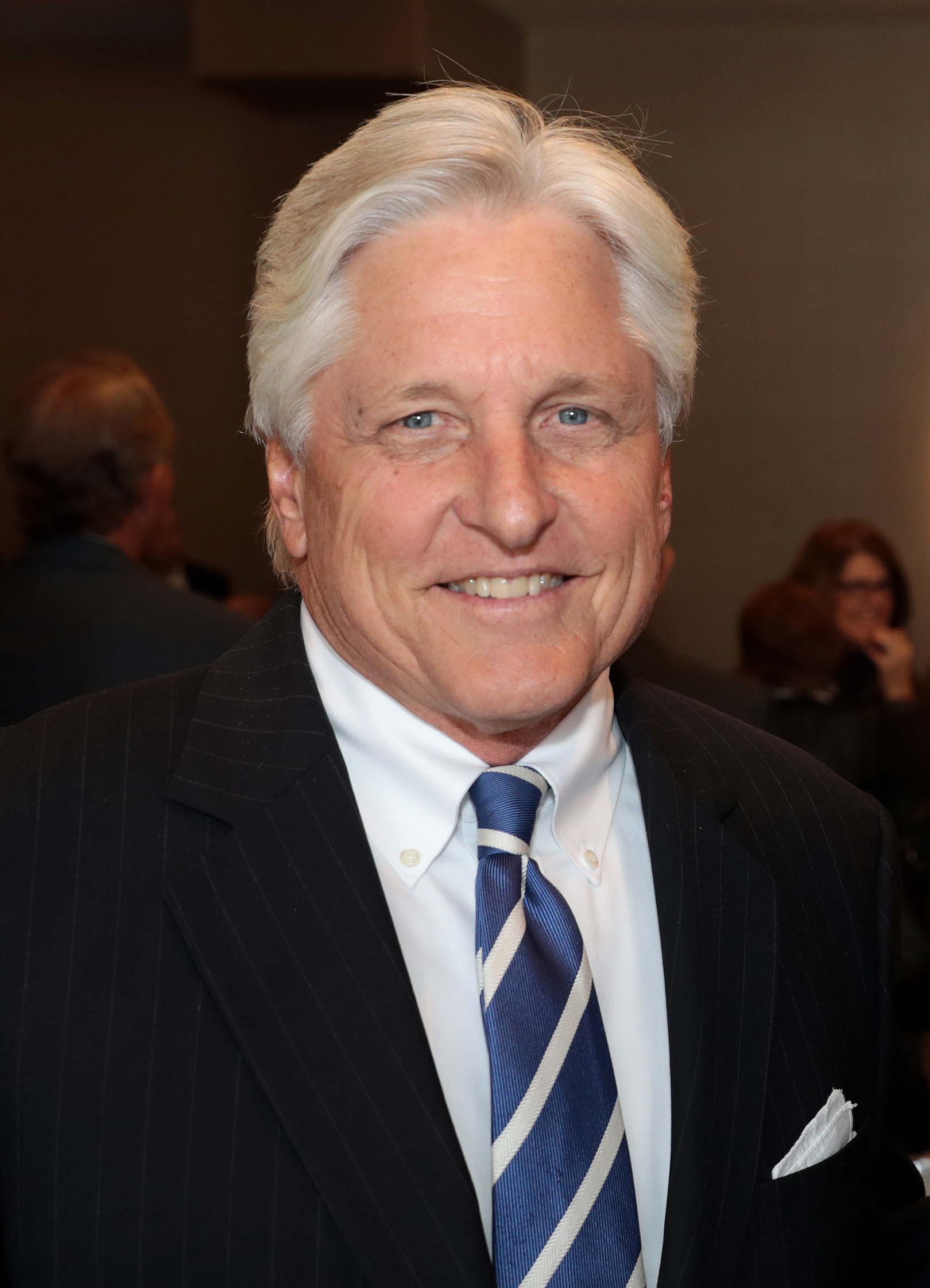

Personal details
- Born: May 24, 1954 (age 72) Ridgewood, New Jersey, U.S.
- Party: Democratic
- Spouse: Jennifer Hecker DuVal
- Education: Occidental College (BA); Arizona State University (JD)
- Website: Campaign website

Fred Price DuVal (born May 24, 1954) is an American businessman, civic leader, education leader and author. He is president of DuVal and Associates, a senior advisor to Dentons Law, chairman of Gunnison Copper, a director of DriveTime Auto Group and twice former chairman of the Arizona Board of Regents. He recently completed a term on the Board of AGB, the Association of Governing Boards. He was the Democratic nominee for Governor of Arizona in the 2014 election, but was defeated by then-state treasurer Doug Ducey. He is a former deputy chief of protocol and also former senior White House staff to President Clinton responsible for coordinating federal policy with the nation's governors. He is the author of two books, "Calling Arizona Home" and "Irons in the Fire".

== Early life and education ==
Fred Price DuVal was born in Ridgewood, New Jersey and was raised in Tucson, Arizona. DuVal graduated from Tucson High School and received a B.A. from Occidental College, where he was selected as a Luce Scholar. DuVal received his Juris Doctor degree from Arizona State University (ASU).

== Political career ==
=== Babbitt administration and 1988 campaign ===
DuVal worked as a senior aide to Governor Bruce Babbitt from 1980 to 1985. He managed Babbitt’s 1978 gubernatorial campaign and his 1988 presidential campaign.

=== National politics and White House ===
DuVal was a founder of the Democratic Governors Association in 1983 and of the centrist Democratic Leadership Council (DLC) in 1985 and served on the Democratic National Committee from 1989 to 1993 and from 2009 to 2011. In 1993, DuVal became Deputy Chief of Protocol at the U.S. Department of State and held the position until 1996. DuVal was Deputy National Campaign Manager for Bill Clinton's 1996 presidential campaign and responsible for campaign activities of Vice President Al Gore.

In 1997, President Bill Clinton appointed DuVal as the White House Deputy Director of Intergovernmental Affairs, where he played a role in the implementation of Personal Responsibility and Work Opportunity Reconciliation Act of 1996. DuVal helped negotiate a national tobacco settlement and guided White House policy development concerning American Indian gaming rights, tribal appropriations, and Section 638. In 1999, DuVal led negotiations between the White House, governors, and mayors about Clinton Executive Order 13132.

In 2000, President Clinton appointed DuVal to the Inter-American Foundation Board of Directors.

In 2006, DuVal founded and until 2008 Chaired “Western Progress” a progressive non-profit think tank which was affiliated with the Center for National Progress.

DuVal later became Treasurer of the Democratic Governors Association (DGA) from 2008 to 2010.

=== Arizona politics ===
In 2002, DuVal ran unsuccessfully for Arizona's 1st congressional district in the U.S. House of Representatives.

In February 2013, DuVal announced his candidacy for Governor of Arizona in the 2014 election. He was endorsed by former Governor Babbitt, DuVal's former boss. DuVal lost to Republican Doug Ducey in the general election.

=== Public Service and the Board of Regents ===
From 2002 to 2006, DuVal served on the Arizona Commerce and Economic Development Commission and Mayor Greg Stanton appointed him to the Phoenix Industrial Development Commission.

In August 2006, DuVal was appointed to his first term on the Arizona Board of Regents by Democratic Governor Janet Napolitano and served as Chairman in 2011. As a Regent, he was co-chair of the "Getting AHEAD" initiative with Maricopa Community Colleges Chancellor Dr. Rufus Glasper. In September 2010, DuVal was appointed to an advisory group for the National Governors Association's "Complete to Compete" educational initiative. DuVal established the non-partisan the National Institute for Civil Discourse (NICD) at the University of Arizona after the near-fatal shooting of Rep. Gabby Giffords (D-AZ) in January 2011.

In 2011 the Arizona Capital Times Best of the Capital Awards recognized DuVal as Arizona’s “Public Policy Leader of the Year in Education.

He was appointed to his second term in 2019 by Republican Governor Doug Ducey, his opponent. In his second term on the Arizona Regents, he led the creation of the Arizona Teachers Academy; has served as a Hunt-Kane Fellow; led the creation of Regents Grants and Regents Community Grants, led the Arizona Better Health initiative that stimulated the creation of multiple new Colleges of Medicine in Arizona, co-chaired both the Northern Arizona University and University of Arizona Presidential Search Committees and has focused on higher education accountability, affordability, and access.

In 2025, DuVal was given the AzBio Public Service Award for 2025 by the Arizona Bioindustry Association (AzBio).

DuVal has given commencement addresses at Arizona State University, The College of Medicine at the University of Arizona, Northern Arizona University and the University of Arizona.

=== Business and Corporate Leadership ===
In June 2018, DuVal was elected Chairman of the Board of Gunnison Copper (previously called Excelsior), a publicly traded mining company with assets under development in Cochise County, Arizona.

== Other activities ==
As part of his work at Clean Energy, DuVal coordinated an alternative energy development program called the Pickens Plan. DuVal established the non-partisan the National Institute for Civil Discourse NICD at the University of Arizona after the near-fatal shooting of Rep. Gabby Giffords (D-AZ) in January 2011 He has served on the boards of the University Medical Center (University of Arizona, Tucson), Children's Action Alliance, the Udall Center for Public Policy, Prescott College, Desert Botanical Garden, the Valley of the Sun YMCA and Valley Big Brothers/Big Sisters.

In 2014 DuVal produced the play “8” in Tucson, Arizona, a reader’s theater-style presentation of the court case that led to the Supreme Court legalizing same-sex marriage.

In 2016, DuVal’s alma mater Occidental College recognized him as “Alumni of the Year” for his many contributions to the nation.

In 2022, DuVal joined the National Board of the Barack Obama Scholars Program.

== Personal life and journalism ==
DuVal is married to Dr. Jennifer Hecker DuVal, Ph.D, an IBH Director at the Mayo Clinic, and has two sons William and Montgomery.

He is co-author of the book Calling Arizona Home, which was published in 2005. In 2010 he wrote and published "Irons in the Fire" a collection of published opinion pieces regarding contemporary Arizona issues. DuVal is a monthly columnist for the Arizona Republic, where he has penned dozens of opinion pieces on a wide variety of issues.

Party political offices
Preceded by Terry Goddard	Democratic nominee for Governor of Arizona; 2014	Succeeded by David Garcia
