= Christine Jones (businesswoman) =

American business woman

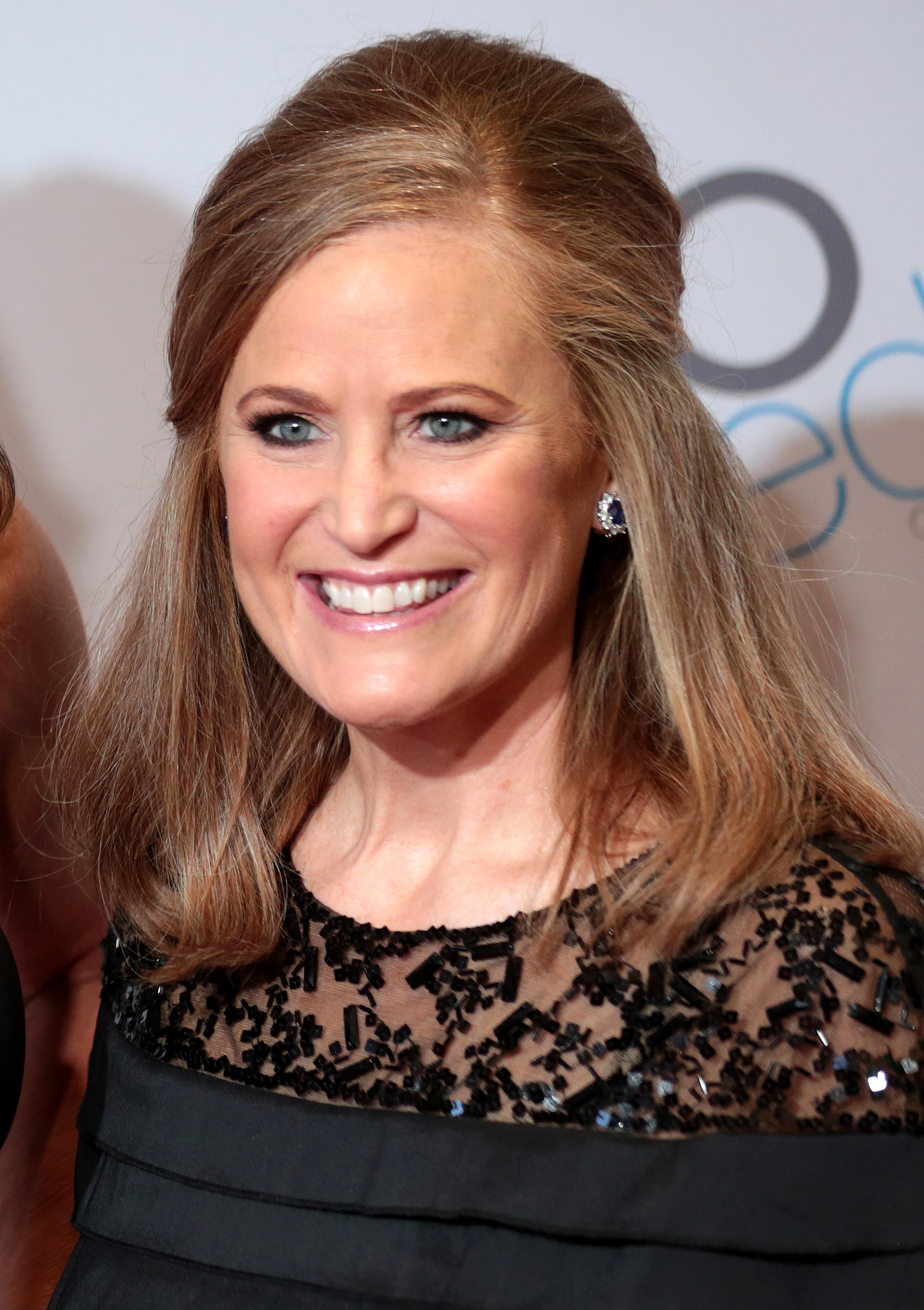

Personal details
- Born: 1968 (age 57–58) Virginia Beach, Virginia, U.S.
- Party: Republican
- Spouse: Gary Jones (1987–present)
- Education: Auburn University; Whittier College
- Website: Official website

Christine N. Jones (born 1968) is an American lawyer and former political candidate from Phoenix, Arizona. Jones unsuccessfully sought the Republican nomination for governor of Arizona in the 2014 election; she lost to Arizona State Treasurer Doug Ducey. In 2016, Jones ran for the United States Congress, narrowly losing the Republican primary to State Senate President Andy Biggs.

== Biography ==
Jones was born in Virginia Beach, Virginia, and raised in Denver, Colorado. She has been married to Gary Jones since 1987. She earned a degree in accounting from Auburn University and a J.D. from Whittier Law School.

== Career ==
Jones served as general counsel and executive vice president of Go Daddy Group Inc., until 2012 where she managed all legal affairs, most notably issues relating to intellectual property.

Jones frequently represented Go Daddy and its industry as a witness at congressional hearings about various issues related to the Internet. She helped drive federal Internet-related legislation, including laws to keep the web safe from child predators and rogue online pharmacies. For example, she helped push through bills such as the Ryan Haight Online Pharmacy Consumer Protection Act, the Protect Our Children Act, and the Keeping the Internet Devoid of Sexual Predators Act. These bills were signed into law by President Bush in 2008 and have been used by law enforcement to shut down illegal online drug sellers and to prosecute online child predators.

Before joining GoDaddy, Jones practiced law at Beus Gilbert, a private law firm in Phoenix, Arizona from 1997 to 2002.

Jones is a member of the American Bar Association and the State Bar of Arizona.

== Civic work ==
After her time at GoDaddy, Jones started the Arizona Research Project, a nonprofit established to "identify issues of importance to voters" so they can engage their legislators and help shape policy.

== Candidate for governor ==
Jones officially became a Republican candidate for the governor of Arizona on April 28, 2014.

== Candidate for Congress ==
On May 3, 2016, Jones officially became a Republican candidate in the state's 5th congressional district. Her home was actually in the neighboring 9th district, but members of the House are only required to live in the state they represent. In the four-way Republican primary, Jones finished second behind State Senate President Andy Biggs, initially by nine votes. A recanvass resulted in Biggs leading by 16 votes, and an automatic recount gave Biggs a 27-vote lead. With only a week to go before state election officials wanted to print ballots for the general election, Jones opted against a court challenge and conceded the nomination to Biggs on September 16.
