= Ken Bennett =

American politician (born 1959)

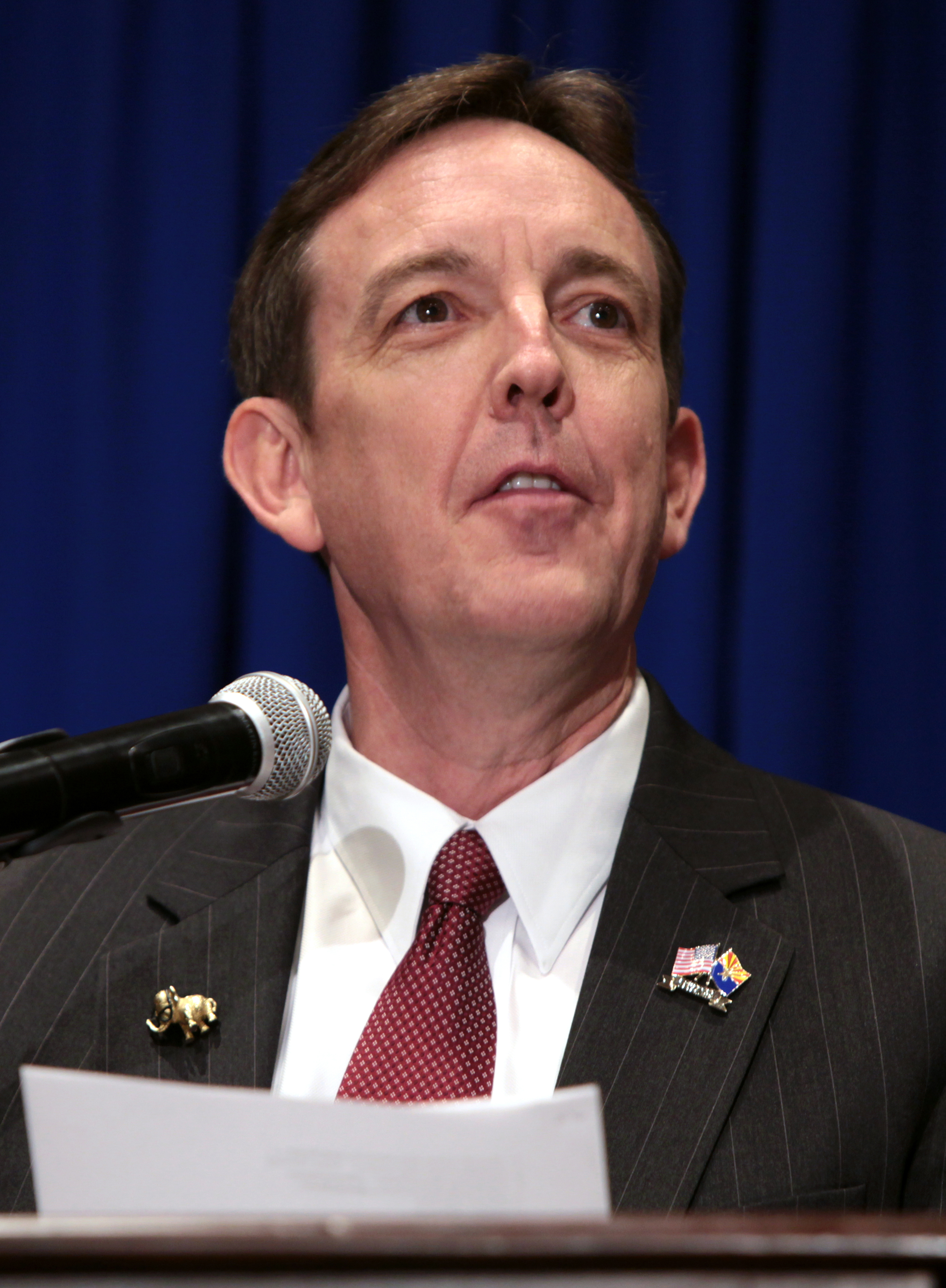
- Bennett in 2015

Member of the Arizona Senate
- In office January 9, 2023 – January 13, 2025
- Preceded by: Karen Fann
- Succeeded by: Mark Finchem
- Constituency: 1st district
- In office January 1999 – January 2007
- Preceded by: Carol Springer
- Succeeded by: Tom O'Halleran
- Constituency: 1st district

19th Secretary of State of Arizona
- In office January 26, 2009 – January 5, 2015
- Governor: Jan Brewer
- Preceded by: Jan Brewer
- Succeeded by: Michele Reagan

President of the Arizona Senate
- In office January 2003 – January 2007
- Preceded by: Randall Gnant
- Succeeded by: Tim Bee

Personal details
- Born: Kenneth Roy Bennett; August 1, 1959 (age 67) Tucson, Arizona, U.S.
- Party: Republican
- Education: Yavapai College; Arizona State University, Tempe (BS)
- Website: Official website

Kenneth Roy Bennett (born August 1, 1959) is an American politician. A member of the Republican Party, he was a member of the Arizona Senate from 2023 to 2025. He previously was a member of the state Senate from 1999 to 2007, and president of the state Senate from 2003 to 2007. He was Secretary of State of Arizona from 2009 to 2015. He unsuccessfully ran for governor of Arizona in the 2014 and 2018 elections.

== Early life ==
Ken Bennett was born in Tucson, Arizona. His parents moved to Prescott shortly thereafter, where he was raised and later graduated from Prescott High School. Upon graduation, Bennett served a two-year mission in southern Japan, and remains an active member of the Church of Jesus Christ of Latter-day Saints.

In 1981, he graduated from Yavapai College under the President's Scholarship. He then transferred to Arizona State University (ASU) in Tempe, graduating with Bachelor's in Accounting.

== Business career ==
Bennett began work for Bennett Oil Company, a fuel distribution business in northern Arizona, in 1984. Initially working in finance, Bennett eventually inherited the position of chief executive officer, where he remained until 2006.

In addition, he sits on the board of directors for Global Building Systems Inc., a sustainable building systems company, as well as Treasurer on the board of directors of Cancer Treatment Centers of America.

== Political career ==
Bennett is an active member of Arizona Tea Party groups and regularly attends Tea Party events and meetings.

Bennett was elected to the Prescott City Council in 1985 and served as Mayor Pro Tem in 1988. He served on the City Council until 1989. He was appointed to the Arizona State Board of education in 1992, serving as president in 1996 and 1998. In 1998, he was elected to the Arizona State Senate, serving four two-year terms, the second as Chairman of the Education Committee, and the third and fourth as President of the Senate (2003–2007).

When Jan Brewer ascended from Arizona Secretary of State to governor upon Janet Napolitano's resignation to become United States Secretary of Homeland Security, Bennett was selected as the new secretary of state, being sworn in on January 26, 2009. Upon completing that term, Bennett won election to a full term as secretary of state in the November 2010 with 59% of the vote.

== Contest of Obama's 2008 Election Qualifications and 2012 Attempt to Restrict Ballot Access ==
In 2012, as secretary of state, Bennett denied being a "birther" (a conspiracy theorist who believed that President Barack Obama was not a U.S. citizen), but nonetheless made national news when he requested Obama's birth certificate from the state of Hawaii as a prerequisite to listing Obama on that year's presidential ballot. Bennett said he had made at the "request of numerous constituents"; after Hawaii provided the verification, Bennett said he accepted that Obama was born in the United States.

== 2014 Governor's Race ==
Bennett officially announced his intention to run for governor on November 12, 2013. Bennett came in fourth in the six-way Republican primary, gaining 11.45% of the vote and losing to Doug Ducey.

== 2016 Congress Run ==
In 2015, Bennett announced his intention to run for Congress in Arizona's 1st Congressional district. He was endorsed by the Arizona Republic. On August 30, 2016, he lost the Republican primary to Sheriff Paul Babeu.

== 2021 Senate Liaison to Arizona Audit ==
In 2021, the Arizona state senate controlled by Republicans provided $150,000 for funding an audit of the 2020 election presidential results in Maricopa County, with Bennett becoming a liaison between the contractors performing the audit, the state, and the county. In late July 2021, it was reported that Bennett had been "banned from entering the building where the recount process is ongoing, after he shared some data with experts that showed the results match the officially certified numbers in Maricopa County".

Bennett's January 6 "Political Prisoner" advocacy organization also held events, titled “What Happened at the Audit: A Town Hall Series with Ken Bennett,” aimed at “giving the public a chance to directly question one of the central figures in the Arizona Audit,” according to a press announcement from the organization, held at Scottsdale Studios owned by j

== January 6 "Political Prisoner" Advocacy Organization ==
Bennett served as a chairman for the Look Ahead Group that advocates for January 6th "political prisoners," with Matt Braynard who briefly worked on the data team for former president Donald Trump's 2016 campaign, and Julie Fisher, who worked on Trump's campaign in 2020.

== Personal life ==
He met his wife Jeanne at ASU, and the two were married in 1982. They have three grown children – Ryan, Dana and Clifton – and two grandsons.

=== Legal troubles involving son ===
In 2005, Clifton, along with two others, were arrested and accused of "brooming" 18 middle-school aged boys in the buttocks area while they were clothed. Witness reports on the "brooming" incidents ranged from the use of brooms to touch the boys' rectal areas, to holding one boy down while shoving a broomstick against his buttocks.

As part of a plea deal that Clifton accepted in 2006, he was sentenced to spend 30 days in jail, in addition to probation and community service.

Despite claims by the parents of some of the victims that the incidents constituted sexual abuse, prosecutors argued instead that the crimes were not sexually motivated, which a trial judge agreed.

Parents of some of the victims have criticized the outcome, decrying what they perceive as a lenient sentence and suggesting that a plea deal was done because of Bennett's political status as president of the state senate.

Both Bennett and the prosecutor have denied allegations of political pressure in the case, with Bennett going as far as accusing critics of knowingly making false statements due to what he claims as a lack of evidence on him attempting to sway the case.

Arizona Senate
Preceded by Randall Gnant	President of the Arizona Senate; 2003–2007	Succeeded by Tim Bee
Political offices
Preceded by Jan Brewer	Secretary of State of Arizona; 2009–2015	Succeeded by Michele Reagan
