= Arizona Revised Statutes =

Statutory laws in the state

The Arizona Revised Statutes (ARS) is the name given to the statutory laws in the U.S. state of Arizona. The ARS went into effect on January 9, 1956. It was most recently updated in the second regular session of the 55th legislature. There are 49 titles, although two have been repealed.

West publishes the official West's Arizona Revised Statutes and the Arizona Revised Statutes Annotated. LexisNexis publishes the Arizona Annotated Revised Statutes.
