= Arizona Board of Regents =

Governing body of state universities in Arizona

- Arizona Board of Regents Seal
- Formation: March 1864; 162 years ago
- Type: Publicly funded by Government of Arizona
- Purpose: State university system governing board
- Headquarters: Phoenix, Arizona
- Affiliations: Arizona State University; University of Arizona; Northern Arizona University
- Website: www.azregents.edu

Location of Public Universities in Arizona

The Arizona Board of Regents (ABOR) is the governing body of Arizona's public university system. It provides policy guidance to Arizona State University, Northern Arizona University, and the University of Arizona.

== History ==
In 1885, the territorial legislature authorized the establishment of the University of Arizona and provided for the management, direction, governance, and control by a board of regents. The two state colleges, one in Tempe and one in Flagstaff, were governed by a three-member state board of education that included the Superintendent of Public Instruction and two members appointed by the Governor of Arizona.

In March 1945, the governor signed a law uniting the governing boards of the university and state colleges of Arizona. The authority of the board of regents expanded to include the Arizona State Teachers College at Tempe (now Arizona State University) and Arizona State Teachers College at Flagstaff (now Northern Arizona University).

== Organization ==
The governor appoints eight volunteer members for staggered eight-year terms; two students serve on the board for two-year appointments, with the first year being a non-voting apprentice year. The governor and the Superintendent of Public Instruction serve as voting ex officio members. The ABOR provides policy guidance and oversight to the three major degree-granting universities as provided for by Title 15 of the Arizona Revised Statutes.

The board of regents is a constitutionally created body corporate; it exists on a plane equivalent to that of the legislature. Arizona universities have no independent legal existence but are extensions of the board.
