= 2014 Arizona elections =

- November 4, 2014

A general election was held in the U.S. state of Arizona on November 4, 2014. All of Arizona's executive officers were up for election as well as all of Arizona's nine seats in the United States House of Representatives. Primary elections were held on August 26, 2014.

== U.S. House of Representatives ==
All of Arizona's nine seats in the United States House of Representatives were up for election in 2014.

== Governor ==
Incumbent Republican governor Jan Brewer was term-limited and could not run for re-election to a second full term in office. After a bitter six-candidate primary, Republicans nominated Arizona State Treasurer Doug Ducey; Democrat Fred DuVal, the former chairman of the Arizona Board of Regents, won his party's nomination unopposed.

Arizona gubernatorial election, 2014
Party	Candidate	Votes	%
Republican	Doug Ducey	805,062	53.44
Democratic	Fred DuVal	626,921	41.62
Libertarian	Barry Hess	57,337	3.81
Americans Elect	John Lewis Mealer	15,432	1.02
Write-in		1,664	0.11
Total votes		1,506,416	100.00
Republican hold			

== Secretary of State ==
Incumbent Republican secretary of state Ken Bennett was term-limited and ineligible to run for re-election to a third term in office. He instead ran unsuccessfully for the Republican nomination for governor. state senator Michele Reagan won the Republican primary, while former attorney general Terry Goddard won the Democratic nomination unopposed.

Arizona Secretary of State election, 2014
Party	Candidate	Votes	%
Republican	Michele Reagan	779,226	52.22
Democratic	Terry Goddard	712,918	47.78
Total votes		1,492,144	100.00
Republican hold			

== Attorney General ==
Incumbent Republican attorney general Tom Horne ran for re-election to a second term in office. Horne, who was under investigation for multiple violations of election laws, was considered vulnerable in both the primary and general elections. Various Arizona Republicans called for him to resign or endorsed his opponent.

=== Results ===
Arizona Attorney General election, 2014
Party	Candidate	Votes	%
Republican	Mark Brnovich	782,361	52.91
Democratic	Felecia Rotellini	696,054	47.07
Write-in		265	0.02
Total votes		1,478,680	100.00
Republican hold			

== Treasurer ==
2014 Arizona State Treasurer election
- November 4, 2014
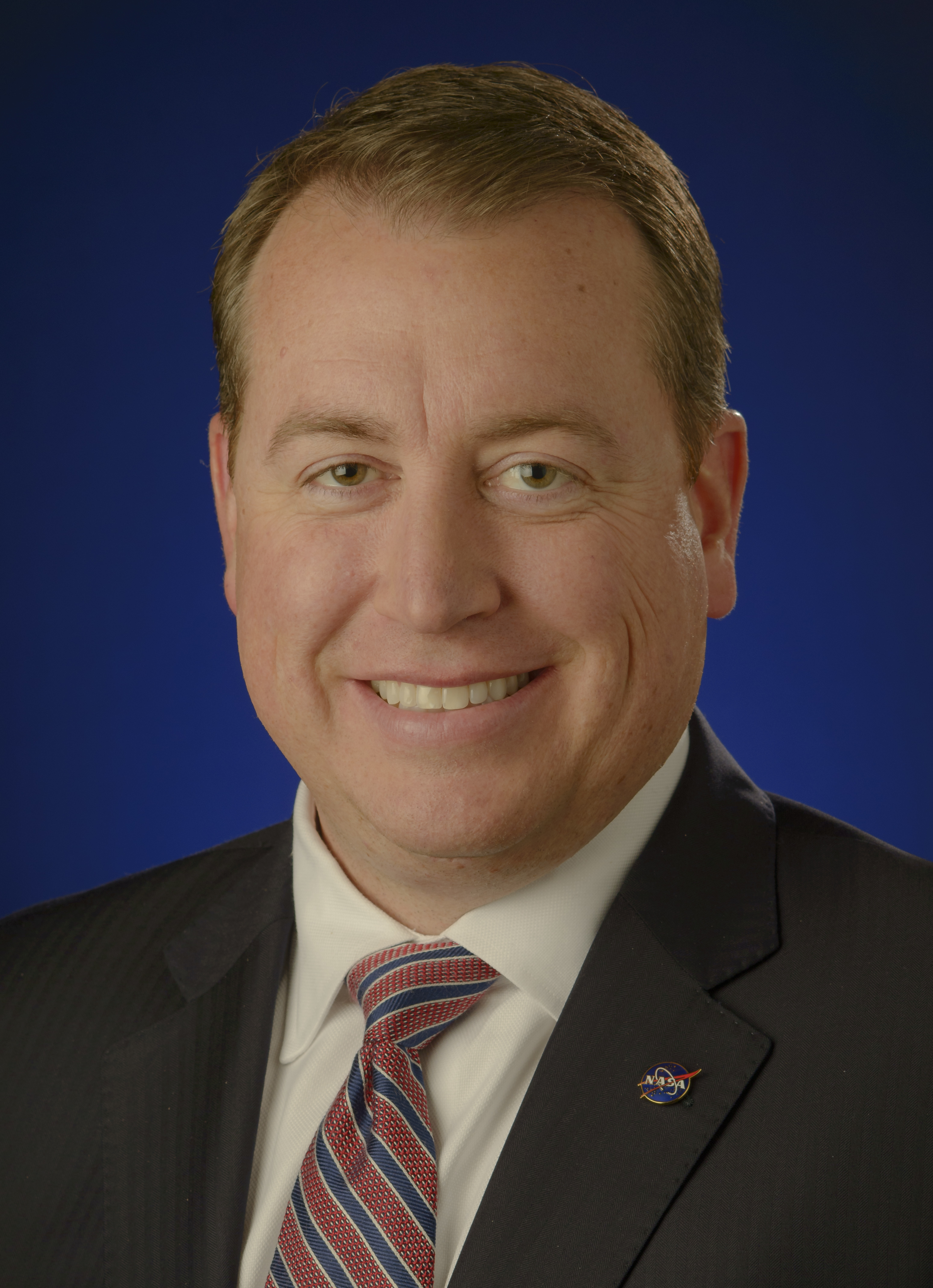
Nominee	Jeff DeWit
Party	Republican
Popular vote	1,063,472
Percentage	100.00%
- County results DeWit: 90–100%
State Treasurer before election
Jeff DeWit
Republican
Elected State Treasurer
Kimberly Yee
Republican

Incumbent Republican State Treasurer Doug Ducey did not run for re-election to a second term in office. He successfully sought the Republican nomination for governor and went on to win the general election.

=== Republican primary ===
==== Candidates ====
- Jeff DeWit, businessman.
- Hugh Hallman, former mayor of Tempe
- Randy Pullen, former chairman of the Arizona Republican Party

==== Polling ====
Poll source	Date(s) administered	Sample size	Margin of error	Jeff DeWit	Hugh Hallman	Randy Pullen	Undecided
Magellan Strategies	August 17–21, 2014	1,281	± 2.74%	25%	23%	20%	32%
Harper Polling	August 19–20, 2014	812	± 3.44%	23%	19%	21%	37%
Magellan Strategies	August 15–18, 2014	1,322	± ?	23%	21%	21%	35%
Magellan Strategies	August 12–15, 2014	1,300	± ?	18%	21%	18%	43%
Magellan Strategies	August 5–7, 2014	1,289	± 2.73%	19%	19%	15%	47%
Magellan Strategies	July 28–31, 2014	1,644	± ?	16%	20%	14%	50%
Harper Polling	July 16–17, 2014	885	± 3.29%	12%	10%	18%	59%
Gravis Marketing	July 14, 2014	691	± 4%	20%	9%	10%	61%
Magellan Strategies	July 9–10, 2014	593	± 4.02%	11%	11%	8%	70%
Harper Polling	June 25–26, 2014	791	± 3.48%	11%	9%	16%	63%
Magellan Strategies	June 3–4, 2014	630	± 3.9%	13%	14%	8%	65%
Magellan Strategies	May 13–14, 2014	760	± 3.6%	10%	12%	10%	68%

=== Debate ===
2014 Arizona State Treasurer election republican primary debates
No.	Date	Host	Moderator	Link	Republican	Republican	Republican
Key: P Participant A Absent N Not invited I Invited W Withdrawn							
Key: P Participant A Absent N Not invited I Invited W Withdrawn					Jeff DeWit	Hugh Hallman	Randy Pullen
1	Jul. 7, 2014	Arizona PBS	Ted Simons	PBS	P	P	P

==== Results ====
Republican primary results
Party	Candidate	Votes	%
Republican	Jeff DeWit	215,892	45.00
Republican	Hugh Hallman	155,775	32.47
Republican	Randy Pullen	108,106	22.53
Total votes		479,773	100.00

=== Democratic primary ===
==== Candidates ====
- Gerard Davis (write-in, did not appear on the ballot)

==== Results ====
Democratic primary results
Party	Candidate	Votes	%
Democratic	Gerard Davis (write-in)	2,789	100.00
Total votes		2,789	100.00

=== General election ===
==== Results ====
Arizona State Treasurer election, 2014
Party	Candidate	Votes	%
Republican	Jeff DeWit	1,063,472	100.00
Total votes		1,063,472	100.00
Republican hold			

== Superintendent of Public Instruction ==
2014 Arizona Superintendent of Public Instruction election
- November 4, 2014
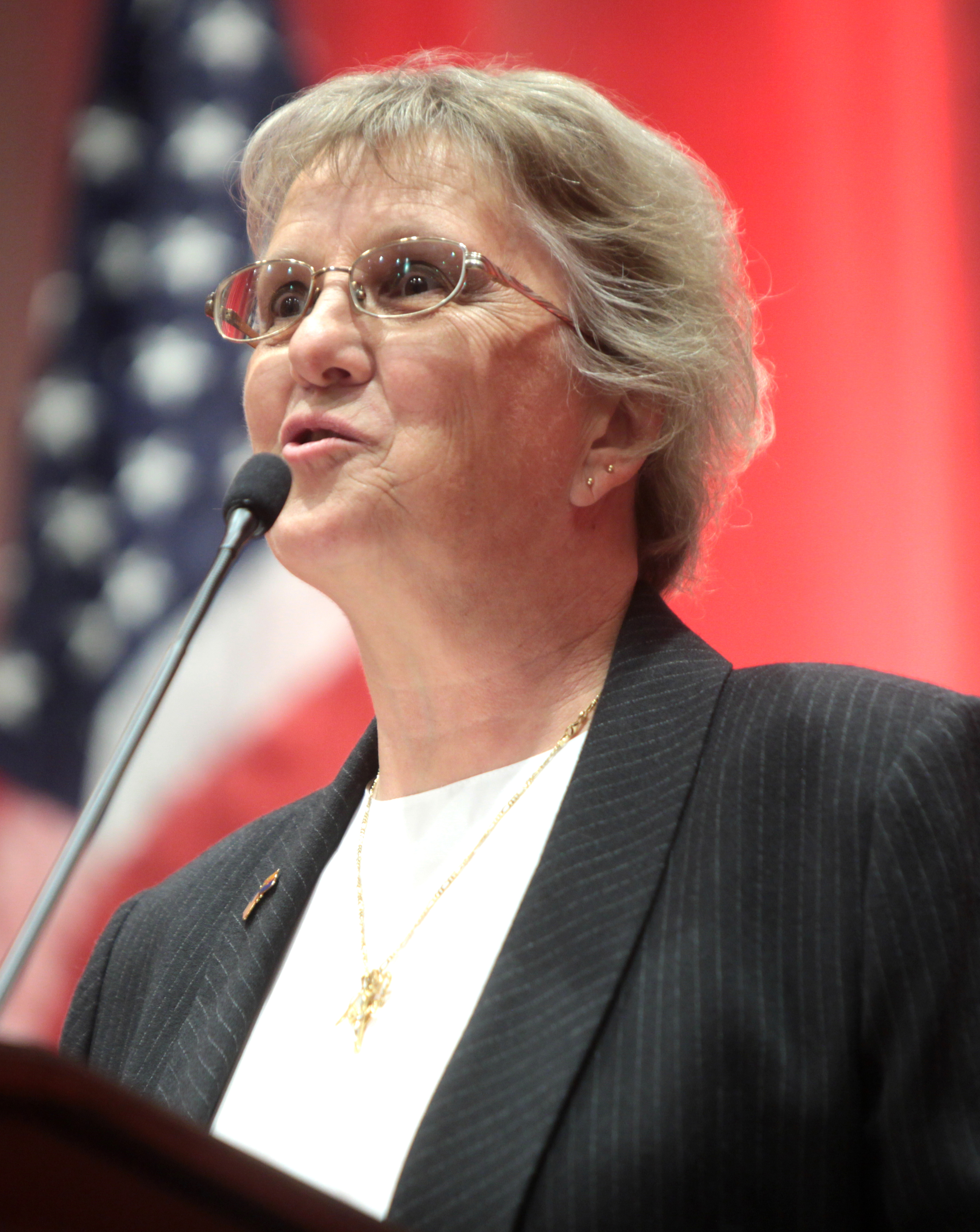

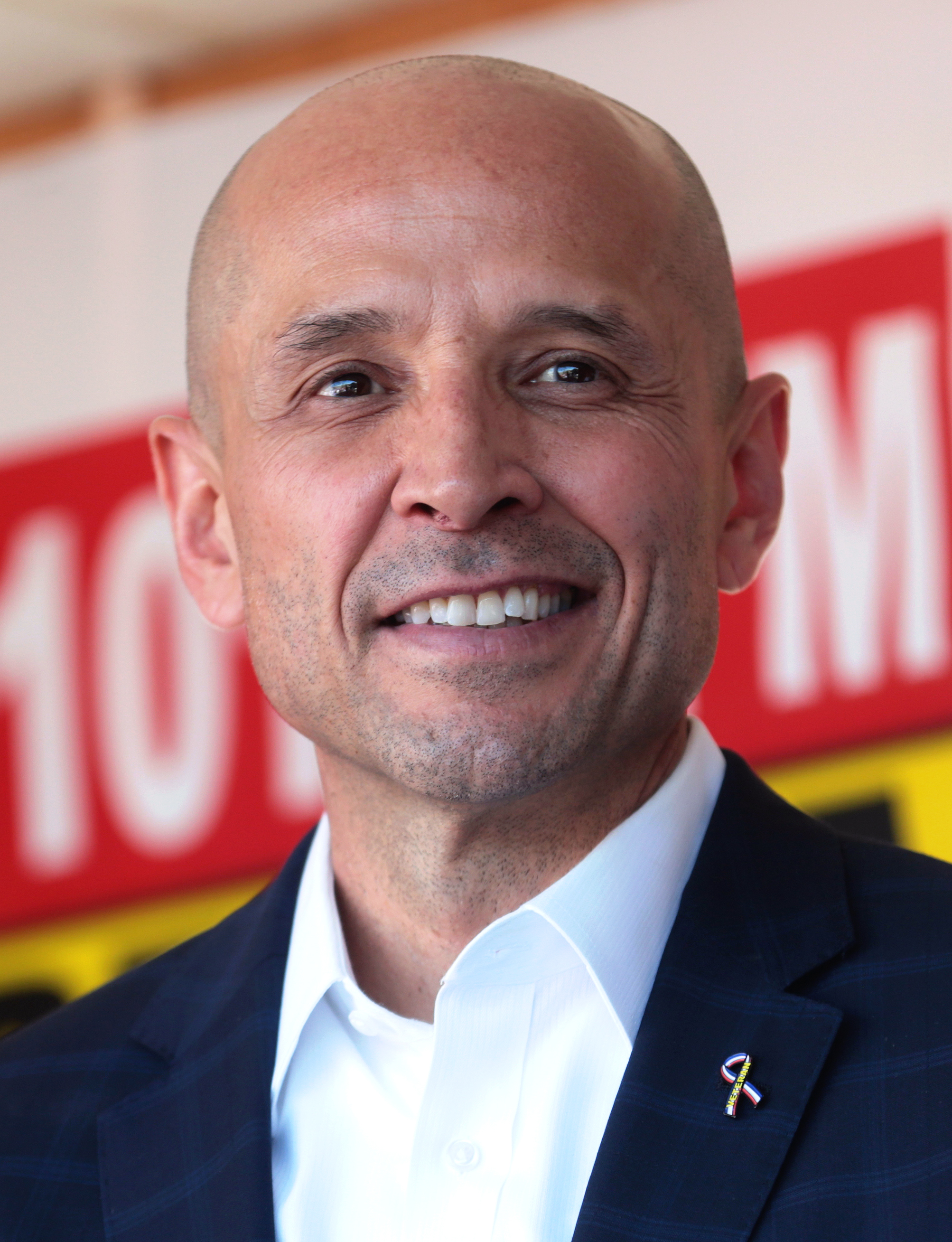
Nominee	Diane Douglas	David Garcia
Party	Republican	Democratic
Popular vote	740,273	724,239
Percentage	50.55%	49.45%
- Douglas: 50–60% 60–70% Garcia: 50–60% 60–70% 70–80%
Superintendent before election
John Huppenthal
Republican
Elected Superintendent
Diane Douglas
Republican

Incumbent Republican Superintendent of Public Instruction John Huppenthal ran for re-election to a second term in office. Huppenthal faced calls for him to resign or withdraw from the race after it was revealed that he made pseudonymous blog posts that attacked welfare recipients, Planned Parenthood and Spanish-language media.

=== Republican primary ===
==== Candidates ====
- John Huppenthal, incumbent superintendent.
- Diane Douglas, former Peoria Unified School District board member.

==== Polling ====
Poll source	Date(s) administered	Sample size	Margin of error	Diane Douglas	John Huppenthal	Undecided
Harper Polling	August 19–20, 2014	812	± 3.44%	39%	34%	28%
Gravis Marketing	July 14, 2014	691	± 4%	35%	25%	40%
Magellan Strategies	July 9–10, 2014	593	± 4.02%	32%	25%	43%

==== Results ====
Republican primary results
Party	Candidate	Votes	%
Republican	Diane Douglas	290,719	58.44
Republican	John Huppenthal (incumbent)	206,744	41.56
Total votes		497,463	100.00

=== Democratic primary ===
==== Candidates ====
- David Garcia, Arizona State University education professor.
- Sharon Thomas, teacher.

==== Results ====
Democratic primary results
Party	Candidate	Votes	%
Democratic	David Garcia	157,233	53.93
Democratic	Sharon Thomas	134,310	46.07
Total votes		291,543	100.00

=== Debate ===
2014 Arizona Superintendent of Public Instruction election debate
No.	Date	Host	Moderator	Link	Republican	Democratic
Key: P Participant A Absent N Not invited I Invited W Withdrawn						
Key: P Participant A Absent N Not invited I Invited W Withdrawn					Diane Douglas	David Garcia
1	Sep. 24, 2014	Arizona PBS	Ted Simons	PBS	P	P

=== Results ===
Arizona Superintendent of Public Instruction election, 2014
Party	Candidate	Votes	%
Republican	Diane Douglas	740,273	50.55
Democratic	David Garcia	724,239	49.45
Total votes		1,464,512	100.00
Republican hold			

== Mine Inspector ==
Incumbent Republican Mine Inspector Joe Hart ran for re-election to a third term in office. He was unopposed in the Republican primary and the general election.

=== Republican primary ===
Republican primary results
Party	Candidate	Votes	%
Republican	Joe Hart (incumbent)	433,404	100.00
Total votes		433,404	100.00

=== General election ===
Results by county Hart: 90–100%

Arizona Mine Inspector election, 2014
Party	Candidate	Votes	%
Republican	Joe Hart (incumbent)	1,050,509	100.00
Total votes		1,050,509	100.00
Republican hold			

== Corporation Commission ==
2014 Arizona Corporation Commission election
- November 4, 2014
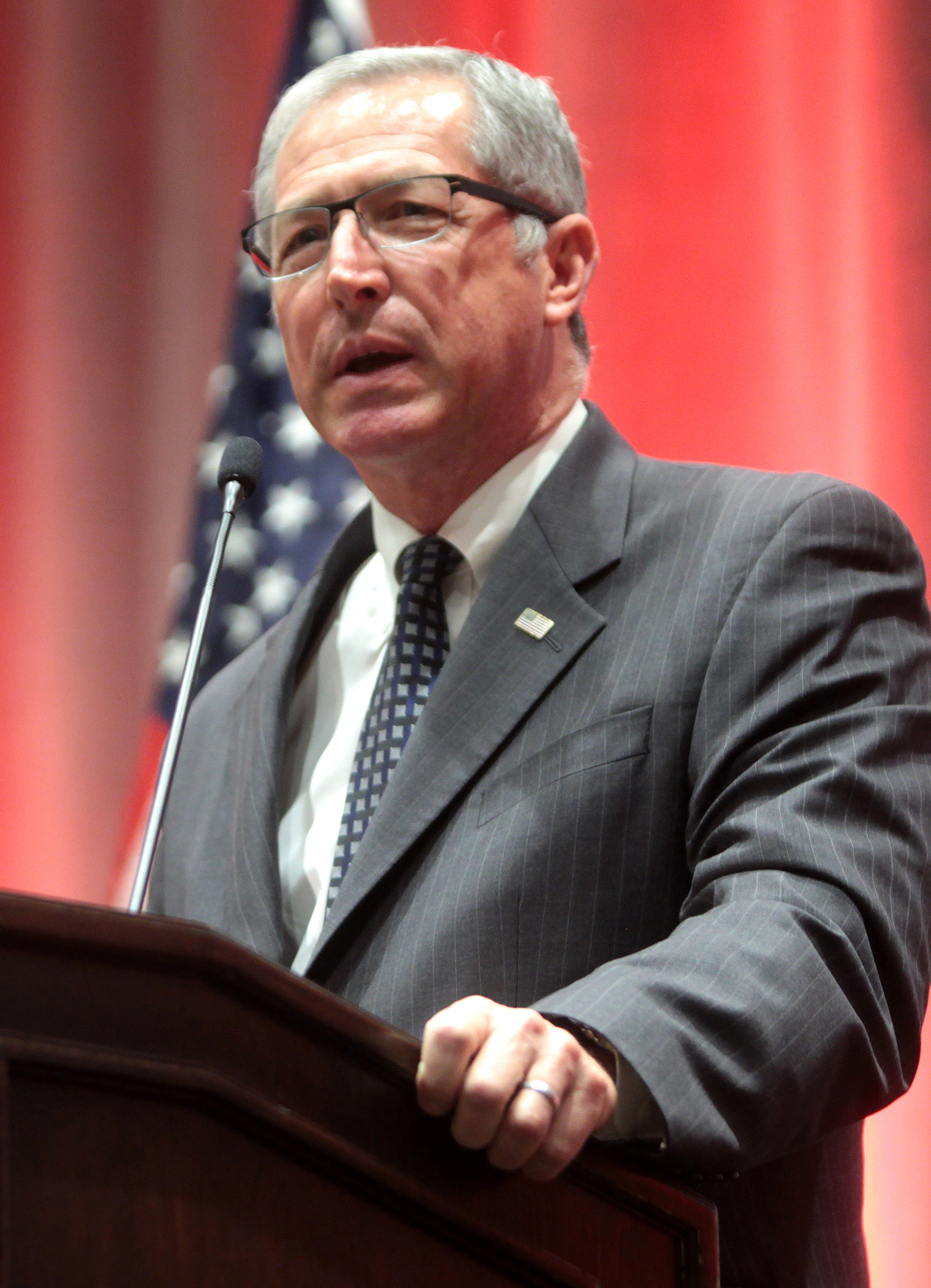

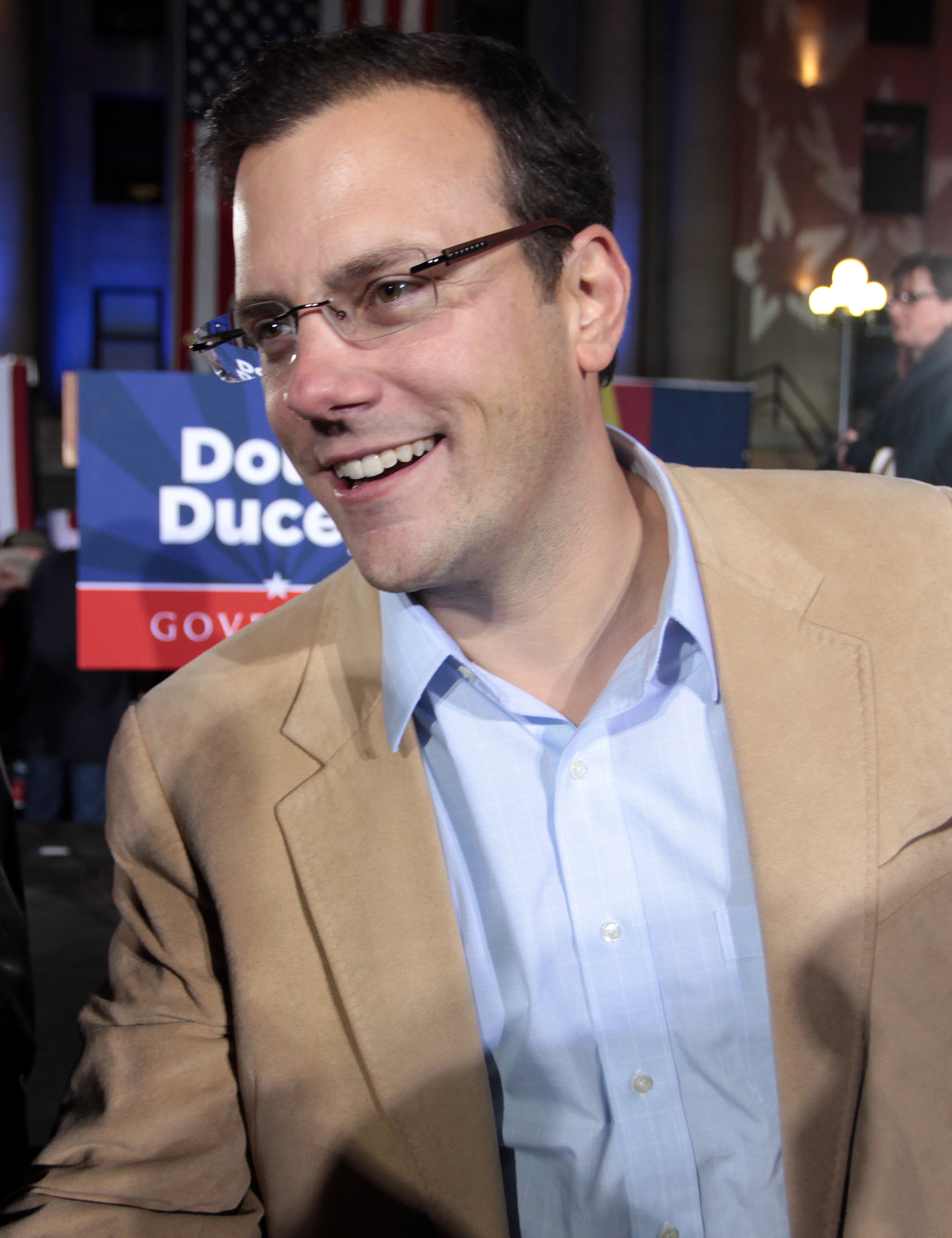

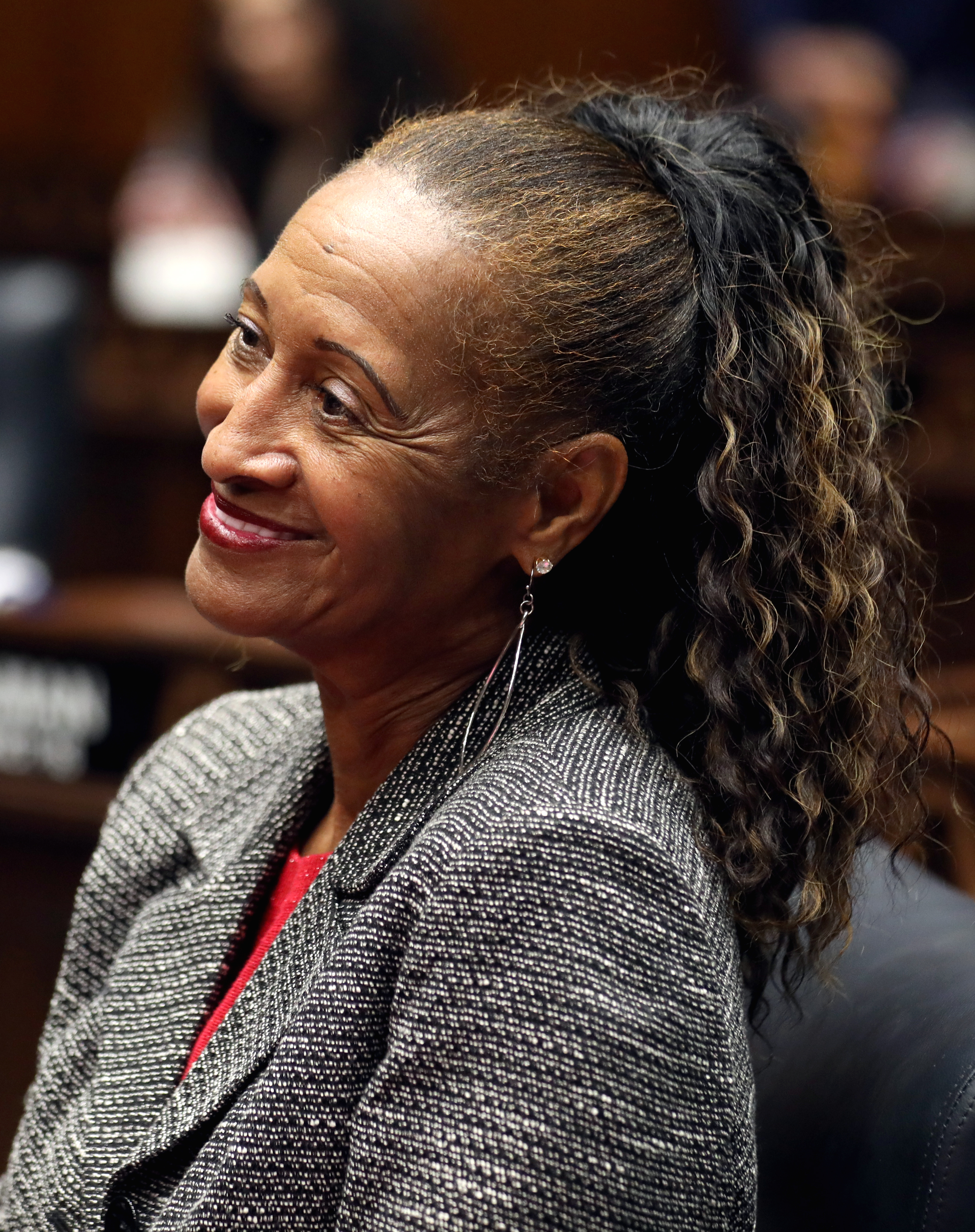

Nominee	Doug Little	Thomas Forese
Party	Republican	Republican
Popular vote	766,864	761,915
Percentage	28.79%	28.60%
Nominee	Sandra Kennedy	Jim Holway
Party	Democratic	Democratic
Popular vote	576,482	557,963
Percentage	21.64%	20.95%
Commissioners before election
Brenda Burns (R)
Gary Pierce (R)
Elected Commissioners
Doug Little (R)
Thomas Forese (R)

Two of the seats on the Arizona Corporation Commission were up for election. Republican Brenda Burns chose not to run for re-election to a second term in office and Republican Gary Pierce was term-limited and ineligible to run for re-election to a third term in office.

=== Republican primary ===
==== Candidates ====
- Doug Little, businessman.
- Thomas Forese, state representative.
- Lucy Mason, former state representative.
- Vernon Parker, former mayor of Paradise Valley.

==== Polling ====
Poll source	Date(s) administered	Sample size	Margin of error	Tom Forese	Doug Little	Lucy Mason	Vernon Parker	Undecided
Harper Polling (Note: As voters can vote for two candidates, the poll also asked: "Who would be your second choice?")	August 19–20, 2014	812	± 3.44%	12%	29%	17%	17%	26%
Harper Polling	August 19–20, 2014	812	± 3.44%	23%	14%	17%	14%	31%
Harper Polling	June 25–26, 2014	791	± 3.48%	5%	5%	10%	23%	57%
Harper Polling	June 25–26, 2014	791	± 3.48%	8%	7%	9%	6%	69%

==== Debate ====
2014 Arizona Corporation Commission election republican primary debates
No.	Date	Host	Moderator	Link	Republican	Republican	Republican	Republican
Key: P Participant A Absent N Not invited I Invited W Withdrawn								
Key: P Participant A Absent N Not invited I Invited W Withdrawn					Thomas Forese	Doug Little	Lucy Mason	Vernon Parker
1	Jun. 24, 2014	Arizona PBS	Ted Simons	PBS	P	P	P	P

==== Results ====
Republican primary results
Party	Candidate	Votes	%
Republican	Doug Little	250,193	28.97
Republican	Thomas Forese	249,951	28.94
Republican	Lucy Mason	199,821	23.13
Republican	Vernon Parker	163,773	18.96
Total votes		863,738	100.00

=== Democratic primary ===
==== Candidates ====
- Sandra Kennedy, commissioner from 2009 to 2013.
- Jim Holway, former assistant director of the Arizona Department of Water Resources.

==== Results ====
Democratic primary results
Party	Candidate	Votes	%
Democratic	Sandra Kennedy	243,189	56.70
Democratic	Jim Holway	185,685	43.30
Total votes		428,874	100.00

=== Independent candidates ===
- Joe Hui, Arizona State University professor and business executive. (write-in)

=== General election ===
==== Debate ====
2014 Arizona Corporation Commission election debate
No.	Date	Host	Moderator	Link	Republican	Democratic	Democratic	Republican
Key: P Participant A Absent N Not invited I Invited W Withdrawn								
Key: P Participant A Absent N Not invited I Invited W Withdrawn					Thomas Forese	Jim Holway	Sandra Kennedy	Doug Little
1	Sep. 21, 2014	Arizona PBS	Ted Simons	PBS	P	P	P	P

==== Polling ====
Poll source	Date(s) administered	Sample size	Margin of error	Tom Forese (R)	Doug Little (R)	Jim Holway (D)	Sandra Kennedy (D)	Undecided
Moore Information	October 7–8, 2014	400	± ≈4.9%	31%	33%	32%	38%	29%

==== Results ====
Arizona Corporation Commission election, 2014
Party	Candidate	Votes	%
Republican	Doug Little	766,864	28.79
Republican	Thomas Forese	761,915	28.60
Democratic	Sandra Kennedy	576,482	21.64
Democratic	Jim Holway	557,963	20.95
Independent	Joe Hui (write-in)	529	0.02
Total votes		2,663,573	100.00
Republican hold			
Republican hold			

== State Legislature ==
All 30 members of the Arizona State Senate and all 60 members of the Arizona House of Representatives were up for election.

=== State Senate ===
Party	Before	After	Change
Republican	17	17	Steady
Democratic	13	13	Steady
Total	30	30	

=== House of Representatives ===
Party	Before	After	Change
Republican	36	36	Steady
Democratic	24	24	Steady
Total	60	60	

== Supreme Court ==
Two justices on the Arizona Supreme Court were up for retention in 2014.

=== Justice Bales retention ===
Results by county Yes: 60–70%; 70–80%; 80–90%

Scott Bales was appointed by Governor Janet Napolitano in 2005 to succeed retiring justice Charles Jones. He was retained by the voters in 2008.

Justice Bales retention, 2014
Choice	Votes	%
For	743,691	73.60
Against	266,695	26.40
Total	1,010,386	100.00
Source: Arizona Secretary of State

=== Justice Brutinel retention ===
Results by county Yes: 60–70%; 70–80%; 80–90%

Robert M. Brutinel was appointed by Governor Jan Brewer in 2010 to succeed retiring justice Michael D. Ryan.

Justice Brutinel retention, 2014
Choice	Votes	%
For	726,153	73.42
Against	262,837	26.58
Total	988,990	100.00
Source: Arizona Secretary of State

== Ballot Propositions ==
Arizona voted on three statewide ballot propositions in 2014.

=== Proposition 122 ===
Results by county Yes: 50-60%; 60–70%; No: 50-60%

The Rejection of Unconstitutional Federal Actions Amendment would allow the state to restrict all state and local government entities from enforcing or cooperating with a federal action that is deemed inconsistent with the U.S. Constitution.

Proposition 122
Choice	Votes	%
For	707,451	51.24
Against	673,337	48.76
Total	1,380,788	100.00
Source: Arizona Secretary of State

=== Proposition 303 ===
Results by county Yes: 60–70%; 70–80%; 80–90%

The Medical Product Authorization for Terminally Ill Patients Initiative would allow drug and medical device manufacturers to make products available to terminally ill patients that have completed phase one of a clinical trial but have not yet been approved by the FDA.

Proposition 303
Choice	Votes	%
For	1,111,850	78.47
Against	304,971	21.53
Total	1,416,821	100.00
Source: Arizona Secretary of State

=== Proposition 304 ===
Results by county No: 60–70%; 70–80%

The Salary Increase for State Legislators Measure would increase legislative salaries from $24,000 to $35,000 per year.

Proposition 304
Choice	Votes	%
For	457,216	32.11
Against	966,605	67.89
Total	1,423,821	100.00
Source: Arizona Secretary of State
