= 2018 Arizona gubernatorial election =

- November 6, 2018
- Turnout: 64.85% ▲17.33pp
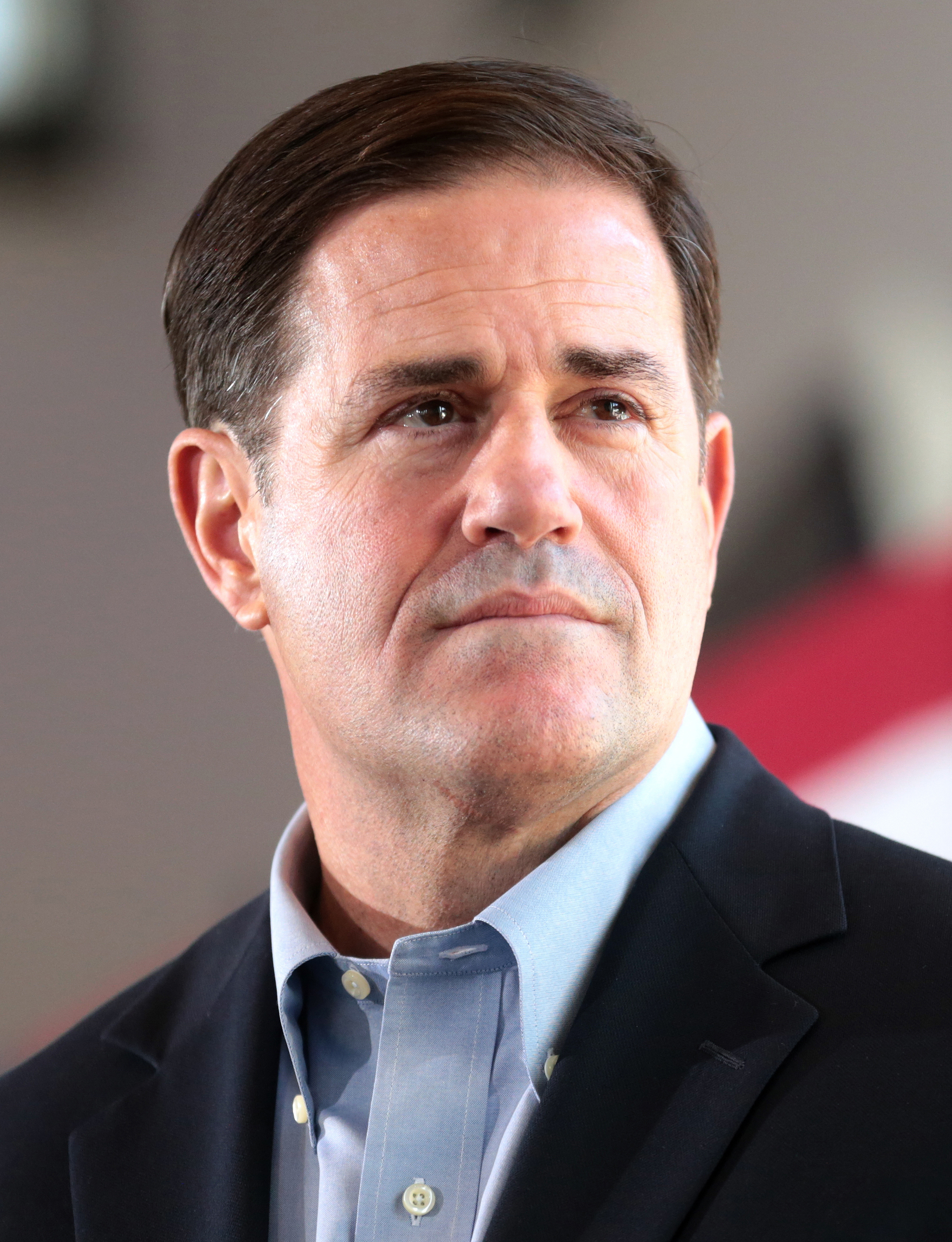

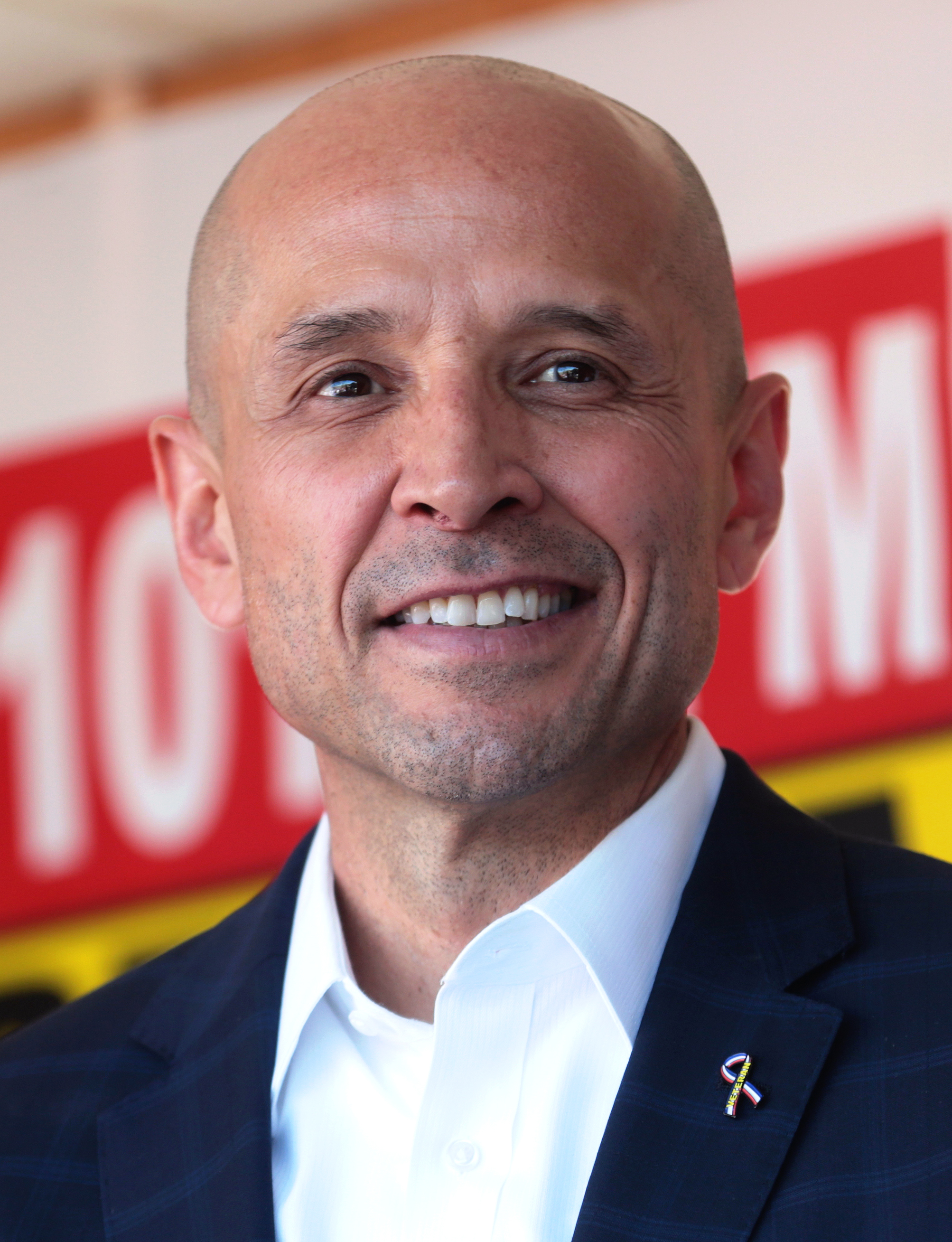
Nominee	Doug Ducey	David Garcia
Party	Republican	Democratic
Popular vote	1,330,863	994,341
Percentage	56.00%	41.84%
- Ducey: 40–50% 50–60% 60–70% 70–80% 80–90% >90% Garcia: 40–50% 50–60% 60–70% 70–80% 80–90% Tie: 40–50% 50% No data
Governor before election
Doug Ducey
Republican
Elected Governor
Doug Ducey
Republican

The 2018 Arizona gubernatorial election took place on November 6, 2018, to elect the governor of Arizona. It was held concurrently with the election of Arizona's Class I U.S. Senate seat, as well as elections for Arizona's congressional seats and various state and local elections.

The primary was held on August 28. Despite considerably closer contests in other Arizona state elections, which included Democratic gains for U.S. Senate, Secretary of State, and Superintendent of Public Instruction, incumbent Governor Doug Ducey won a second term, with a slightly increased majority from his 2014 win and the largest margin of victory of any statewide candidate on the ballot.

== Republican primary ==
=== Candidates ===
==== Nominee ====
- Doug Ducey, incumbent governor

==== Eliminated in primary ====
- Ken Bennett, former secretary of state of Arizona
- Robert Weber (write-in)

=== Endorsements ===
Doug Ducey

Organizations

- Arizona Association of Realtors
- Arizona Chamber of Commerce and Industry
- Arizona Fraternal Order of Police
- Arizona Police Association
- Arizona State Troopers Association
- Chandler Chamber of Commerce
- Gilbert Chamber of Commerce
- Greater Phoenix Chamber of Commerce
- Flagstaff Chamber of Commerce
- Mesa Chamber of Commerce
- National Border Patrol Council
- National Federation of Independent Business
- Professional Fire Fighters of Arizona
- Tucson Metro Chamber

Newspapers

- Arizona Daily Star
- The Arizona Republic
- Casa Grande Dispatch
- The Daily Courier (Prescott, Arizona)
- Today's News-Herald (Lake Havasu City, Arizona)

Individuals

- John Doyle, Nogales mayor
- Mark Lamb, Pinal County Sheriff
- Scott Mascher, Yavapai County Sheriff
- Cindy McCain, philanthropist and businesswoman
- Mark Napier, Pima County Sheriff
- Mike Pence, 48th Vice President of the United States
- Gerardo Sanchez, San Luis mayor
- Donald Trump, 45th President of the United States
- Robert Uribe, Douglas mayor

=== Polling ===
Poll source	Date(s) administered	Sample size	Margin of error	Doug Ducey	Ken Bennett	Undecided
Emerson College	June 21–22, 2018	305	± 5.9%	44%	22%	35%

=== Results ===
Results by county: Ducey: 50–60%; 60–70%; 70–80%

Republican primary results
Party	Candidate	Votes	%
Republican	Doug Ducey (incumbent)	463,672	70.7
Republican	Ken Bennett	191,775	29.3
Republican	Robert Weber (write-in)	91	0.0
Total votes		655,538	100.0

== Democratic primary ==
=== Candidates ===
==== Nominee ====
- David Garcia, Arizona State University professor and nominee for Superintendent of Public Instruction in 2014

==== Eliminated in primary ====
- Mirza Fareed "Fareed" Baig (write-in)
- Steve Farley, state senator
- Kelly Fryer, nonprofit executive and activist

==== Declined ====
- Terry Goddard, former Arizona Attorney General and nominee for governor in 2010 and 1990
- Kyrsten Sinema, U.S. Representative from Arizona's 9th congressional district (ran for U.S. Senate)
- Greg Stanton, Mayor of Phoenix (ran for U.S. House)

=== Endorsements ===
David Garcia

Labor unions

- American Federation of Government Employees
- Arizona Building and Construction Trades Council
- Arizona Education Association
- Communications Workers of America

Organizations

- Democracy for America
- Latino Victory Fund
- People for the American Way
- Planned Parenthood Arizona
- Progressive Change Campaign Committee
- Sierra Club
- VoteVets
- Working Families Party

=== Polling ===
Poll source	Date(s) administered	Sample size	Margin of error	Steve Farley	Kelly Fryer	David Garcia	Undecided
OH Predictive Insights	August 14–15, 2018	589	± 4.0%	25%	7%	40%	28%
Data Orbital	June 25–27, 2018	550	± 4.2%	11%	6%	33%	49%
Emerson College	June 21–22, 2018	260	± 6.2%	13%	8%	30%	48%
Garin-Hart-Yang (D-Garcia)	May 21–23, 2018	400	± 5.0%	11%	11%	32%	46%
Public Policy Polling (D-Garcia)	January 5–7, 2018	446	–	22%	–	43%	36%

=== Results ===
Results by county: Garcia: 30–40%; 40–50%; 50–60%; 60–70%; Farley: 40–50%

Democratic primary results
Party	Candidate	Votes	%
Democratic	David Garcia	255,555	50.6
Democratic	Steve Farley	163,072	32.3
Democratic	Kelly Fryer	86,810	17.2
Democratic	Mirza Fareed Baig (write-in)	44	0.0
Total votes		505,481	100.0

== Libertarian primary ==
=== Candidates ===
==== Disqualified ====
- Jeff Funicello, activist
- Barry Hess (write-in)
- Kevin McCormick, candidate for president in 2016

=== Endorsements ===
Kevin McCormick

Individuals

- William Weld, former governor of Massachusetts

== Green primary ==
=== Candidates ===
==== Nominee ====
- Angel Torres (write-in)

==== Eliminated in primary ====
- Noah Dyer (write-in)

=== Results ===
Results by county: Torres: 90–100%; 80–90%; 70–80%; 60–70%; Torres/Dyer tie: 50–60%; No votes

Green primary results
Party	Candidate	Votes	%
Green	Angel Torres (write-in)	357	76.3
Green	Noah Dyer (write-in)	111	23.7
Total votes		468	100.0

== Independents ==
=== Candidates ===
==== Disqualified ====
- Noah Dyer, author, businessman and educator
- Christian R. Komor, author, psychologist, climate scientist

==== Declined ====
- Tim Jeffries, former director of the Arizona Department of Economic Security

== General election ==
=== Debates ===
Dates	Location	Ducey	Garcia	Link
September 24, 2018	Tempe, Arizona	Participant	Participant	Full debate – YouTube
September 25, 2018	Tucson, Arizona	Participant	Participant	Full debate – C-SPAN

=== Predictions ===
Source	Ranking	As of
The Cook Political Report	Likely R	October 26, 2018
The Washington Post	Likely R	November 5, 2018
FiveThirtyEight	Safe R	November 5, 2018
Rothenberg Political Report	Likely R	November 1, 2018
Sabato's Crystal Ball	Likely R	November 5, 2018
RealClearPolitics	Likely R	November 4, 2018
Daily Kos	Safe R	November 5, 2018
Fox News (Note: The Fox News Midterm Power Rankings uniquely does not contain a category for Safe/Solid races)	Likely R	November 5, 2018
Politico	Likely R	November 5, 2018
Governing	Lean R	November 5, 2018

=== Polling ===
View source data.

Poll source	Date(s) administered	Sample size	Margin of error	Doug Ducey (R)	David Garcia (D)	Angel Torres (G)	Other	Undecided
HarrisX	November 3–5, 2018	600	± 4.0%	53%	39%	–	–	–
HarrisX	November 2–4, 2018	600	± 4.0%	55%	37%	–	–	–
Emerson College	November 1–3, 2018	758	± 3.7%	55%	40%	–	–	5%
HarrisX	November 1–3, 2018	600	± 4.0%	57%	36%	–	–	–
Research Co.	November 1–3, 2018	450	± 4.6%	54%	39%	–	2%	5%
HarrisX	October 31 – November 2, 2018	600	± 4.0%	56%	37%	–	–	–
Gravis Marketing	October 24 – November 2, 2018	1,165	± 2.9%	53%	40%	–	–	7%
HarrisX	October 30 – November 1, 2018	600	± 4.0%	57%	36%	–	–	–
HarrisX	October 29–31, 2018	600	± 4.0%	54%	37%	–	–	–
Vox Populi Polling	October 27–30, 2018	677	± 3.7%	54%	46%	–	–	–
HarrisX	October 24–30, 2018	1,400	± 2.6%	57%	35%	–	–	–
Fox News	October 27–29, 2018	643 LV	± 3.5%	55%	37%	–	2%	5%
Fox News	October 27–29, 2018	710 RV	± 3.5%	54%	35%	–	3%	7%
CNN/SSRS	October 24–29, 2018	702 LV	± 4.4%	52%	45%	–	0%	1%
CNN/SSRS	October 24–29, 2018	867 RV	± 4.0%	52%	43%	–	0%	3%
HighGround Public Affairs	October 26–28, 2018	400	± 4.9%	55%	35%	4%	–	7%
Marist College	October 23–27, 2018	506 LV	± 5.4%	54%	40%	5%	<1%	2%
Marist College	October 23–27, 2018	506 LV	± 5.4%	55%	42%	–	1%	1%
Marist College	October 23–27, 2018	793 RV	± 4.4%	54%	38%	5%	<1%	3%
Marist College	October 23–27, 2018	793 RV	± 4.4%	55%	41%	–	1%	3%
YouGov	October 23–26, 2018	972	± 4.1%	52%	41%	–	1%	5%
Ipsos	October 17–26, 2018	799	± 4.0%	57%	37%	–	2%	3%
OH Predictive Insights	October 22–23, 2018	600	± 4.0%	57%	39%	1%	–	3%
Change Research (D-Garcia)	October 9–10, 2018	783	–	47%	40%	–	–	11%
OH Predictive Insights	October 3, 2018	600	± 4.0%	54%	37%	2%	–	7%
Data Orbital	October 1–3, 2018	550	± 4.2%	52%	34%	2%	2%	9%
Fox News	September 29 – October 2, 2018	716 LV	± 3.5%	55%	37%	–	1%	7%
Fox News	September 29 – October 2, 2018	806 RV	± 3.5%	54%	35%	–	2%	9%
Vox Populi Polling	September 29 – October 1, 2018	702	± 3.5%	57%	43%	–	–	–
Suffolk University	September 27–30, 2018	500	± 4.4%	50%	38%	2%	0%	10%
Latino Decisions	September 10–25, 2018	463 LV	–	45%	40%	–	–	15%
Latino Decisions	September 10–25, 2018	610 RV	–	41%	37%	–	–	19%
Emerson College	September 19–21, 2018	650	± 4.4%	42%	38%	–	6%	14%
Marist College	September 16–20, 2018	564 LV	± 4.7%	49%	39%	6%	<1%	6%
Marist College	September 16–20, 2018	564 LV	± 4.7%	51%	43%	–	<1%	5%
Marist College	September 16–20, 2018	763 RV	± 4.2%	48%	37%	7%	<1%	7%
Marist College	September 16–20, 2018	763 RV	± 4.2%	51%	42%	–	1%	6%
CNN/SSRS	September 11–15, 2018	761 LV	± 4.3%	49%	46%	–	0%	2%
CNN/SSRS	September 11–15, 2018	854 RV	± 4.1%	48%	45%	–	1%	4%
Ipsos	September 5–14, 2018	1,016	± 4.0%	51%	39%	–	4%	7%
TargetSmart (D-ProgressNow AZ)	September 8–13, 2018	800	± 4.0%	49%	48%	–	0%	3%
Fox News	September 8–11, 2018	710 LV	± 3.5%	51%	40%	–	1%	8%
Fox News	September 8–11, 2018	801 RV	± 3.5%	49%	39%	–	1%	10%
Gravis Marketing	September 5–7, 2018	882	± 3.3%	48%	44%	–	–	9%
Data Orbital	September 4–6, 2018	550	± 4.2%	49%	41%	–	2%	8%
Public Policy Polling (D-Garcia)	August 30–31, 2018	554	± 4.2%	44%	43%	–	–	13%
Gravis Marketing	June 27 – July 2, 2018	925	± 3.2%	41%	42%	–	–	17%
Public Policy Polling (D-Garcia)	January 5–7, 2018	735	± 4.0%	42%	43%	–	–	15%
Public Policy Polling (D-Garcia)	June 7–8, 2017	1,020	± 3.1%	42%	44%	–	–	14%

Hypothetical polling

with Steve Farley

Poll source	Date(s) administered	Sample size	Margin of error	Doug Ducey (R)	Steve Farley (D)	Undecided
Gravis Marketing	June 27 – July 2, 2018	925	± 3.2%	42%	39%	19%
GQR Research (D-Farley)	February 23 – March 5, 2018	500	± 4.4%	49%	44%	7%
Public Policy Polling (D-Garcia)	January 5–7, 2018	735	± 4.0%	42%	39%	19%
Public Policy Polling (D-Garcia)	June 7–8, 2017	1,020	± 3.1%	42%	40%	18%

with generic Democrat

Poll source	Date(s) administered	Sample size	Margin of error	Doug Ducey (R)	Generic Democrat	Undecided
Morning Consult	June 29 – July 9, 2018	1,641	± 2.0%	34%	41%	25%

with Kyrsten Sinema

Poll source	Date(s) administered	Sample size	Margin of error	Doug Ducey (R)	Kyrsten Sinema (D)	Undecided
Public Policy Polling	May 13–15, 2016	896	± 3.3%	43%	36%	21%

=== Results ===
Arizona gubernatorial election, 2018
Party	Candidate	Votes	%	±%
Republican	Doug Ducey (incumbent)	1,330,863	56.00%	+2.56%
Democratic	David Garcia	994,341	41.84%	+0.22%
Green	Angel Torres	50,962	2.14%	N/A
Write-in		275	0.01%	-0.10%
Total votes		2,376,441	100.0%	N/A
Republican hold				

==== By county ====
County	David Garcia Democratic		Doug Ducey Republican		Angel Torres Green		Margin		Total votes
County	#	%	#	%	#	%	#	%	Total votes
Apache	14,955	59.72%	9,175	36.64%	912	3.64%	5,780	23.08%	25,042
Cochise	14,576	32.10%	29,638	65.26%	1,201	2.64%	-15,062	-33.17%	45,415
Coconino	30,712	55.91%	22,778	41.47%	1,440	2.62%	7,934	14.44%	54,930
Gila	5,623	27.38%	14,444	70.34%	468	2.28%	-8,821	-42.96%	20,535
Graham	2,569	24.19%	7,776	73.21%	276	2.60%	-5,207	-49.03%	10,621
Greenlee	832	32.64%	1,637	64.22%	80	3.14%	-805	-31.58%	2,549
La Paz	1,122	21.99%	3,852	75.49%	129	2.53%	-2,730	-53.50%	5,103
Maricopa	603,055	42.09%	800,210	55.85%	29,495	2.06%	-197,155	-13.76%	1,432,760
Mohave	13,580	18.97%	56,682	79.18%	1,325	1.85%	-43,102	-60.21%	71,587
Navajo	13,646	37.30%	21,880	59.81%	1,055	2.88%	-8,234	-22.51%	36,581
Pima	195,227	50.25%	184,621	47.52%	8,678	2.23%	10,606	2.73%	388,526
Pinal	38,801	33.21%	75,272	64.42%	2,767	2.37%	-36,471	-31.21%	116,840
Santa Cruz	8,407	62.46%	4,792	35.60%	261	1.94%	3,615	26.86%	13,460
Yavapai	32,159	29.68%	74,148	68.44%	2,029	1.87%	-41,989	-38.76%	108,336
Yuma	19,077	43.47%	23,958	54.60%	846	1.93%	-4,881	-11.12%	43,881
Total	994,341	41.8%	1,330,863	56.0%	50,962	2.1%	336,522	14.2%	2,376,166

==== By congressional district ====
Ducey won six of nine congressional districts, including two that elected Democrats.

District	David Garcia Democratic	Doug Ducey Republican	Representative
1st	43%	54%	Tom O'Halleran
2nd	46%	52%	Ann Kirkpatrick
3rd	58%	39%	Raúl Grijalva
4th	25%	73%	Paul Gosar
5th	34%	64%	Andy Biggs
6th	38%	60%	David Schweikert
7th	67%	30%	Ruben Gallego
8th	33%	65%	Debbie Lesko
9th	52%	45%	Greg Stanton
