= David Garcia (politician) =

American politician (born 1969)

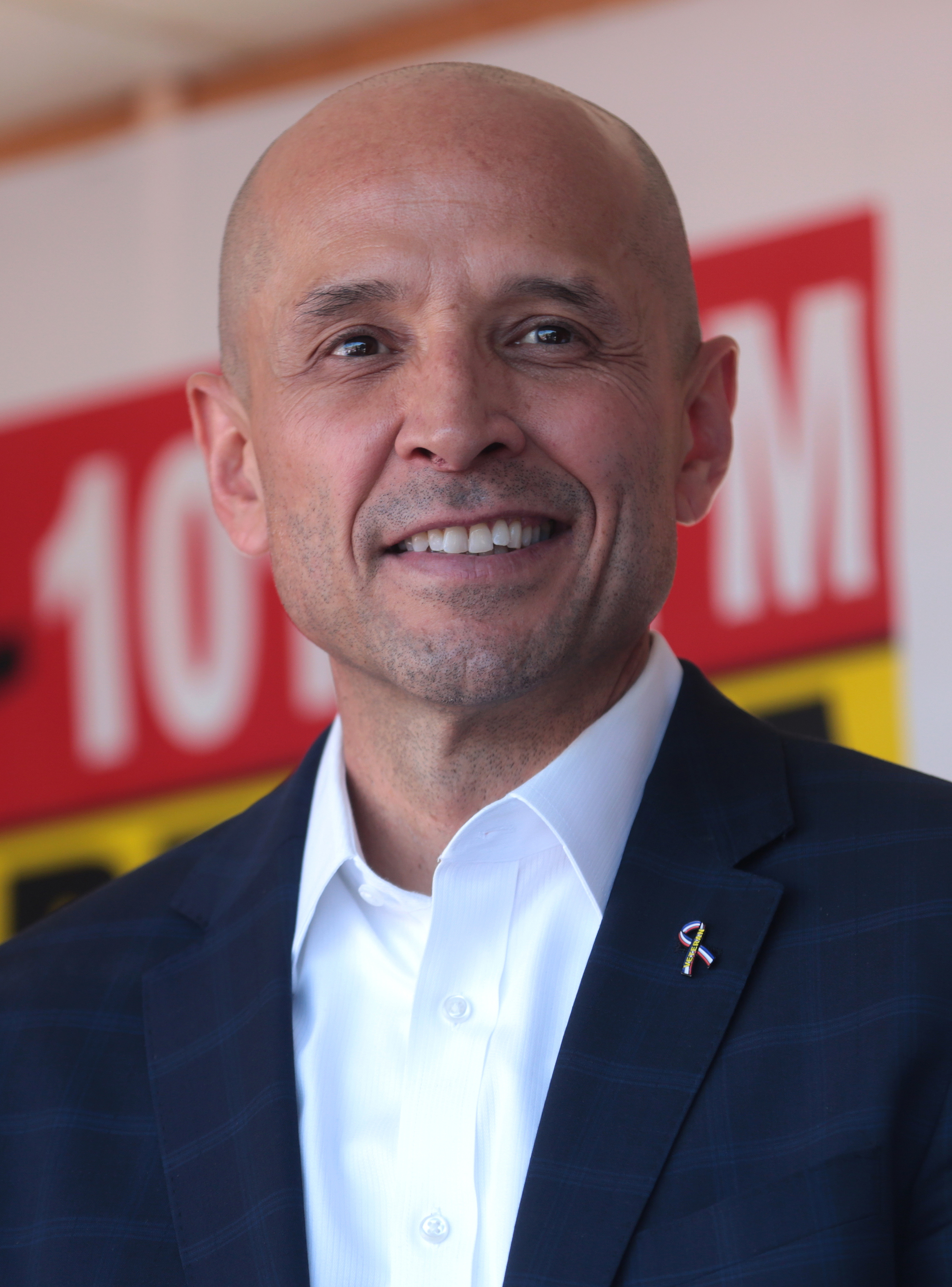

Personal details
- Born: 1969 (age 55–56); Phoenix, Arizona, U.S.
- Political party: Democratic
- Education: Arizona State University (BA); University of Chicago (MA, PhD)

Military service
- Allegiance: United States
- Branch/service: United States Army

David Garcia is an American politician and education professor who was the Democratic Party's nominee in the 2018 Arizona gubernatorial election.

Garcia is an associate professor at Arizona State University's Mary Lou Fulton Teachers College. He was the 2014 Democratic candidate for Superintendent of Public Instruction, but was defeated by the Republican Party's nominee, Diane Douglas. Garcia challenged Republican governor Doug Ducey in the November 2018 Arizona gubernatorial election, losing by 14%.

== Early life and education ==
Garcia, a fourth generation Mexican-American, was born and raised in Mesa, Arizona. He served as an infantryman in the United States Army. Garcia graduated from Arizona State University with a B.A. in communication in 1993. He also graduated from the University of Chicago with a M.A. in education research in 1997 and a Ph.D. in education research in 2002.

== Career ==
An education researcher, Garcia previously worked in the Arizona Department of Education and currently works as an associate professor at ASU's Mary Lou Fulton Teachers College. In 2014, Garcia ran unsuccessfully for state superintendent against Republican Diane Douglas.

Despite his loss to Douglas, who was considered a historically weak candidate, Garcia announced his plan to challenge incumbent Republican governor Doug Ducey in April 2017. Garcia defeated state legislator Steve Farley in the August 2018 Democratic gubernatorial primary.

While Garcia's 2014 bid attracted independent and Republican support, his 2018 campaign was considered progressive. Garcia's 2018 bid focused on supporting Medicare for All, raising income taxes to spend more on education initiatives, and opposing a wall along Arizona's southern border with Mexico. He also supported a “top-to-bottom” overhaul of ICE. Garcia's candidacy for governor had been compared to the candidacies of Bernie Sanders and Alexandria Ocasio-Cortez. In 2021, the Arizona Daily Star described Garcia as "a weak candidate with a campaign beset by missteps, including what was interpreted as a call for open borders".

On Election Day, Garcia was defeated by Ducey, 56.0%-41.8%.

== Personal life ==
Garcia is married to Lori Higuera, a corporate attorney in the Phoenix area. They have two daughters.

Party political offices
Preceded by Fred DuVal	Democratic nominee for Governor of Arizona; 2018	Succeeded by Katie Hobbs
