= Arizona Department of Education =

State agency

Agency overview
- Formed: 1970
- Jurisdiction: Arizona
- Headquarters: 1535 W Jefferson St, Phoenix, AZ 85007
- Annual budget: US$ 6 billion (2018)
- Agency executive: Tom Horne, Superintendent
- Website: www.azed.gov

Arizona Department of Education (ADE) is a state-level department tasked in Arizona with oversight of public education from kindergarten to secondary school. The ADE is run by an elected Arizona Superintendent of Public Instruction.

== History ==
The Arizona Department of Education (ADE) was established in 1970. It works to implement education standards and policy for Arizona schools. The ADE operates under the Superintendent of Public Instruction in order to execute decisions. It is part of the Arizona K-12 Education system along with the State Board of Education and the Superintendent of Public Instruction. However, these were both established in 1912 prior to the ADE. All three of these bodies operate together to run the education system in Arizona. The ADE provides multiple resources to Arizona schools including training, funding, and other technical support to public schools.

== Leadership ==
Kathy Hoffman was elected State Superintendent of Public Instruction in 2018, replacing Diane Douglas. Prior to this position, she was a speech pathologist in various Arizona school districts. Hoffman studied Japanese and Spanish at the University of Oregon, graduating in 2009. She later graduated from the University of Arizona with a master's degree in speech pathology. Following her graduation, Hoffman taught in the Vail and Peoria districts. The two previous State Superintendents of Public Instruction had not had any classroom experience.

GOP candidate Diane Douglas was sworn into office in January 2015, after winning 50.5% of the vote. Douglas has a background in finance and served two years on the Peoria Unified School Board. Her term was marked by various conflicts with both the state Board of Education as well as Governor Doug Ducey. A recall effort was started in 2015, but it failed to receive enough signatures to take effect. Douglas received attention after trying to fire two members of the Arizona Board of Education, and then sued the Board of Education after they reinstated these two members. The lawsuit was later dismissed, but more controversy followed after Douglas claimed that a member of the board tried to assault her. The board later filed two lawsuits against her for access to her teacher files as well as for access to the board's website.

== Budget ==
The 2019 Arizona budget proposed $4.5 billion to be spent on Arizona's K-12 education. Arizona consistently ranks low in both teacher pay and overall quality of education. In 2018, Arizona was ranked 43rd in overall quality of education and 48th in teachers’ salaries. Arizona teachers have also experienced a decrease in salary with inflation included. Many have called for an increase in funding, which led to a week long teacher strike that took place in 2018, following the Red for Ed movement. Arizona also ranks below the national average in per student expenditure, with an average of $11,787. In 2000, Proposition 301 passed with the approval of Arizona voters. Originally, the proposition expired in 2012, but in 2018, Arizona Governor Doug Ducey signed SB 1390 to extend Proposition 301 until 2041. This proposition protects a $667 annual fund for Arizona schools.

Since 2009, Arizona has cut the school budgets and even to this day they continue. Although newer budgets are being proposed and passed the majority of those cuts have yet to be restored today despite a sharp incline in the economy. These budget cuts lead to the Red for Ed movement which saw teachers across the state stage a walkout in protest of low salaries and budgets. Since 2006 a total of $4.56 billion has cut from the educational system.

== Programs and responsibilities ==
=== Red For Ed movement ===
The Red for Ed movement originated in West Virginia in February 2018, when educators there went on strike in response to a 2% pay raise. The Arizona movement started with a Facebook page, titled Arizona Teachers United in March 2018. On March 12, 2018, a group of educators protested outside a radio station where Governor Doug Ducey was participating in an interview, but Ducey did not respond to the protestors. Following the protest, hundred of teachers did not show up to work, which forced the closure of 9 schools in Arizona's west valley. In the weeks prior to the walk-out, there were multiple demonstrations in opposition to the state of education in Arizona, including multiple strikes, some of which took place within Arizona's largest school district. On April 19, 2018, the Arizona Educators United organized a vote to walk out on April 26, 2018, if a list of demands was not met by the governor. More than 50,000 educators protested in front of the capital in the largest movement in Arizona history. The strike concluded with educators receiving close to $273 in pay raises over the next three years. However, many of their demands were not met before they agreed to return to the classroom.

=== English as a Second Language Education ===
The ADE has been especially criticized in the past for its English as a Second Language Education. In 1992 in Flores v. State of Arizona the courts ruled in favor of the parents of ESL students and ruled that there would be changes in the English Education provided by schools. English education was again reformed in 2000 with the passing of Proposition 203 which dictated that all education would be conducted in English “as quickly and effectively as possible”. Later in 2006, House Bill 2064 required all first-year English students to take 4 hours of English a day while also creating funding for various programs. In 2014, the courts ruled that the state had taken the appropriate measures to fulfill the ruling in Flores v. State of Arizona. In recent years, the current curriculum for English education for language learners has been called into question. Senate Bill 1014, introduced in 2019, would change the amount of English education these students receive throughout the school day. Rather than the current 4 hours of instruction, the bill would reduce instruction to 2 hours in order to reduce segregation and encourage conversation with native speakers.

=== Educator certification ===
The ADE sets the requirements for Arizona Educator Certification as well as providing resources and assistance in obtaining this certification. The ADE assists in certifying teachers for a variety of specialties including Early Childhood, Elementary, Secondary, CTE, STEM, Arts, Physical Education, Administration, Special Education, Adult Education. However, Doug Ducey recently signed legislature into place that allows teachers in Arizona to be hired without formal training, as long as they have at least 5 years of experience in relevant fields.

=== Achievement Tutoring Program (ATP) ===
The Achievement Tutoring Program or ATP is a tutoring program designed to provide reading, writing, and mathematics tutoring for students in grades K-12. The tutoring is provided by both public school districts and charter schools with the goal of increasing student proficiency on the statewide Arizona's Academic Standards Assessment. Schools can set up in-person or online tutoring sessions for students eligible for the program. Tutoring can take place before or after school hours only.
