= Diane Douglas =

American politician

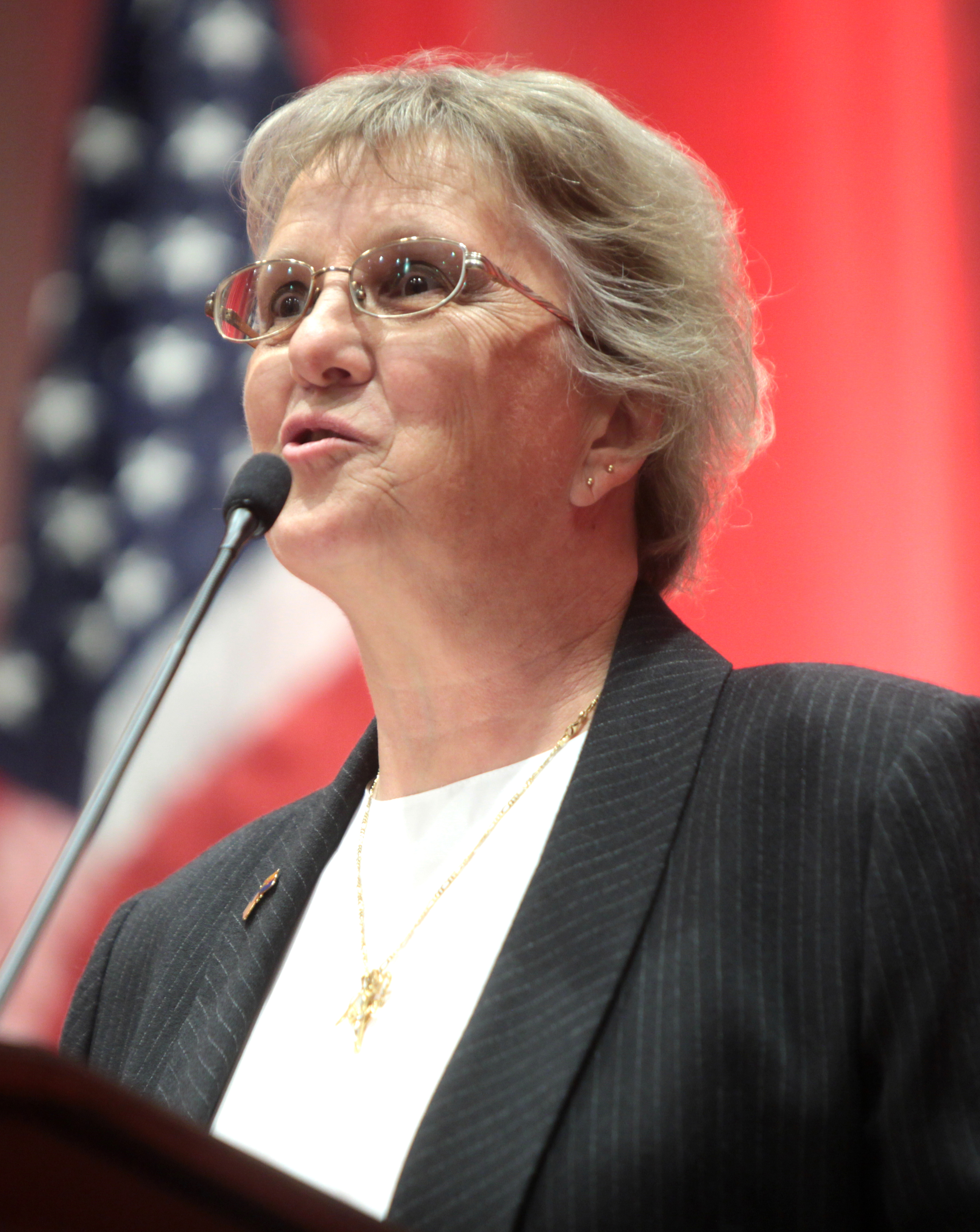

21st Arizona Superintendent of Public Instruction
- In office January 5, 2015 – January 7, 2019
- Governor: Doug Ducey
- Preceded by: John Huppenthal
- Succeeded by: Kathy Hoffman

Personal details
- Born: Plainfield, New Jersey, U.S.
- Political party: Republican
- Education: Raritan Valley Community College; Rutgers University, New Brunswick (BA)

Diane Douglas is an American politician who served as Arizona Superintendent of Public Instruction from 2015 to 2019. She was elected on November 4, 2014, edging out her Democratic opponent, David Garcia, by one percentage point.

Douglas succeeded John Huppenthal, whom she defeated for the party's nomination in the Republican primary on August 26, 2014. Immediately after her election, Douglas faced a recall effort by voters who claimed that she was not qualified for the position.

== Early career and education ==
Born in Plainfield, New Jersey, Douglas earned an Associate degree in business from Somerset County College and a Bachelor of Arts in business and marketing from Rutgers University.

== Career ==
Prior to serving as Superintendent of Public Instruction, Douglas worked in accounting and financial analysis for several firms. She has also spoken at conferences sponsored by AZ Right to Life and Americans for Prosperity.

Douglas was the subject of a recall effort while serving on the Peoria Unified School District board in 2010 due to a conflict of interest. Douglas was also serving as the treasurer of the axthetax.com coalition, which was opposed to a temporary one cent Arizona sales tax to fund education. Douglas lost to Gary Sherwood in 2012 for the Sahuaro District of the Glendale, Arizona City Council by 330 votes.

=== Superintendent of Public Instruction ===
Douglas was elected as the Arizona Superintendent of Public Instruction in 2014. She was subsequently sworn into office on January 5, 2015, succeeding John Huppenthal, who lost in the Republican primary on August 26, 2014.

In her first year in office, a recall effort failed to gather enough signatures to make the ballot. However, as of August 2016, Douglas's approval rating was just 16 percent. In the 2018 elections, Douglas lost her re-election bid in the Republican party primary despite being the incumbent, finishing third in a closely contested race in which the top four candidates all received approximately 20% to 22% of the vote. She was eventually succeeded by Democrat Kathy Hoffman.

== Electoral history ==
Arizona Superintendent of Public Instruction Republican Primary Election, 2014
Party	Candidate	Votes	%
Republican	Diane Douglas	290,719	58.4
Republican	John Huppenthal (inc.)	206,744	41.6

Arizona Superintendent of Public Instruction Election, 2014
Party	Candidate	Votes	%
Republican	Diane Douglas	740,273	50.6
Democratic	David Garcia	724,239	49.5

Arizona Superintendent of Public Instruction Republican Primary Election, 2018
Party	Candidate	Votes	%
Republican	Frank Riggs	124,872	21.8
Republican	Bob Branch	124,643	21.8
Republican	Diane Douglas (inc.)	121,452	21.2
Republican	Tracy Livingston	115,778	20.2
Republican	Jonathan Gelbart	85,511	14.9

Political offices
Preceded by John Huppenthal	Arizona Superintendent of Public Instruction; 2015–2019	Succeeded by Kathy Hoffman
