= John Huppenthal =

American politician (born 1954)

Arizona Superintendent of Public Instruction
- In office January 3, 2011 – January 5, 2015
- Governor: Jan Brewer
- Preceded by: Tom Horne
- Succeeded by: Diane Douglas

Arizona State Senator
- In office 2005–2010
- Constituency: District 20

Arizona State Representative
- In office 2000–2004

Arizona State Senator
- In office 1992–2000
- Constituency: District 6

Personal details
- Born: March 3, 1954 (age 72) Michigan City, Indiana, U.S.
- Party: Republican
- Spouse: Jennifer Huppenthal
- Children: 2

John Huppenthal (born March 3, 1954) is an American politician who served as Arizona Superintendent of Public Instruction from 2011 to 2015. Prior to being elected Superintendent, Huppenthal served as City Councilman, State Representative, and State Senator. Huppenthal was also a Senior Planning Analyst for Salt River Project.

== Personal life ==
Huppenthal was born in Michigan City, Indiana and moved with his family to Arizona during childhood. He graduated from Salpointe Catholic High School in Tucson. He earned a Bachelor of Science in Mechanical Engineering from Northern Arizona University. He then obtained a Master of Business Administration from Arizona State University.

== Political ==
=== Chandler City Council (1984–1992) ===
Huppenthal was elected to the Chandler City Council in 1984, where he served two four-year terms.

=== Arizona State Senate (1992–2000) ===
Huppenthal was first elected State Senator in 1992. In the primary election, Huppenthal faced two opponents; former Chandler Mayor Jerry Brooks and Don Goldwater, nephew of Barry Goldwater. Huppenthal won with nearly 50% of the vote. As a state senator from District 6, he was chairman of the Senate Education Committee.

=== Arizona House of Representatives (2000–2004) ===
In 2000, Huppenthal was elected State Representative, serving from 2000 to 2004.

=== Arizona State Senate (2005–2010) ===
In 2004, Huppenthal announced he would seek to reelection to the State Senate. Huppenthal was supported by U.S. Senator John McCain, who issued a statement praising Huppenthal as a "straight shooter" and a "friend of the taxpayer". Huppenthal won by a 60% to 40% margin.

In 2005, an effort to recall John Huppenthal was launched but failed to obtain enough signatures to make it to the ballot. The recall effort claimed he was out-of-touch with District 20 voters.

=== Arizona Superintendent of Public Instruction (2011–2015) ===
Huppenthal was elected Arizona Superintendent of Public Instruction in the 2010 state election.

Huppenthal ran on a platform of "stopping La Raza" ("The Race", i.e., Hispanic identity.) He banned state funding for ethnic studies programs, resulting in the Tucson Unified School District ("TUSD") having to shut down its Mexican-American studies program and remove numerous books from classrooms, including William Shakespeare's The Tempest. Huppenthal's ban was based on passage of House Bill 2281 (also known as HB 2281 and A.R.S. § 15–112), which he had co-authored as an Arizona State Senator. The bill targeted the TUSD Mexican-American studies program, based on claims that it was politicizing students and breeding resentment against whites. A subsequent report commissioned by Huppenthal was released in May 2011 finding no evidence of the ethnic studies program being in violation of the law. The study did, however, find that the program was helping to close the achievement gap."

Huppenthal was defeated in his race for reelection in the Republican Party primary in 2014 by Diane Douglas, who subsequently won the general election, and succeeded him in office in January 2015.

On his last day in office, Huppenthal issued a letter warning the Tucson Unified School District that they were illegally promoting ethnic solidarity and the overthrow of the U.S. government by teaching Mexican history and hip hop. The letter stated that a culturally relevant U.S. history class taught from the Mexican-American perspective violates HB 2281's restrictions against advocating ethnic solidarity because it "includes substantial Mexican history", and that another such history course violates the law's ban on promoting the overthrow of the U.S. government by teaching the Rage Against the Machine song "Take the Power Back". The letter also stated that a culturally relevant U.S. history course taught from the African-American perspective violates the law because it includes "An Introduction to Hip Hop Presented by Master Teacher, KRS-One." The Tucson Unified School District offers these culturally relevant courses pursuant to a federal court order, arising from a decades-long desegregation lawsuit.

In 2017, HB 2281 was criticized for showing "discriminatory intent" and violating the constitutional rights of the students of Arizona from Federal Judge A. Wallace Tashima.

== Controversy ==
In 2010, as part of a High School television production class project, Keith Wagner interviewed Huppenthal, then a State Senator and running for the office of State Superintendent of Public Instruction, on the topic of budget cuts for Career and Technical Education ("CTE"). Huppenthal stated that "these are critically important programs", and decried the budget cuts to them as being "simply horrendous". Wagner then reminded Huppenthal that he had voted for a legislative bill to cut $550 million from the Arizona Department of Education's budget, with "a lot of that" cut being in CTE, then asked what factors led to that decision. Huppenthal did not address the question, but, when pressed, walked out of the interview.

In June 2014, an Arizona political blogger alleged that Huppenthal was the person behind pseudonyms used for several years to post anonymous comments on his blog, and other political websites.

The anonymous comments referred to Huppenthal in the third-person, discussed subjects including abortion, the economy, education, child protection and race, and were overtly supportive of Huppenthal's actions and policies. Comments labeled critics as "evil scum", called recipients of public assistance "lazy pigs", and compared the work of Planned Parenthood founder Margaret Sanger to the actions of the Nazis. One group of comments included a call to shut down Spanish-language media: "We all need to stomp out balkanization. No Spanish radio stations, no Spanish billboards, no Spanish tv stations, no Spanish newspapers. This is America, speak English. [...] I don't mind them selling Mexican food as long as the menus are mostly in English. And, I'm not being humorous or racist. A lot is at stake here." Media outlets characterized the comments as "harsh", "inflammatory", and "racist screeds".

On June 16, 2014, Phoenix television station KPNX broke the story, claiming that not only was Huppenthal responsible for the comments, but that he had posted many of them from his office at the Arizona Department of Education. Although Huppenthal did not respond to KPNX's request for comment, two days after the story ran he held a news conference, where he admitted to making the comments, and hundreds of other anonymous posts on political blogs. He defended his positions, but apologized for his "hurtful" comments, stating "I sincerely regret if my comments have offended anyone."

Political offices
Preceded by Tom Horne	Arizona Superintendent of Public Instruction; 2011–2015	Succeeded by Diane Douglas
