= Doug Little =

American businessman and politician

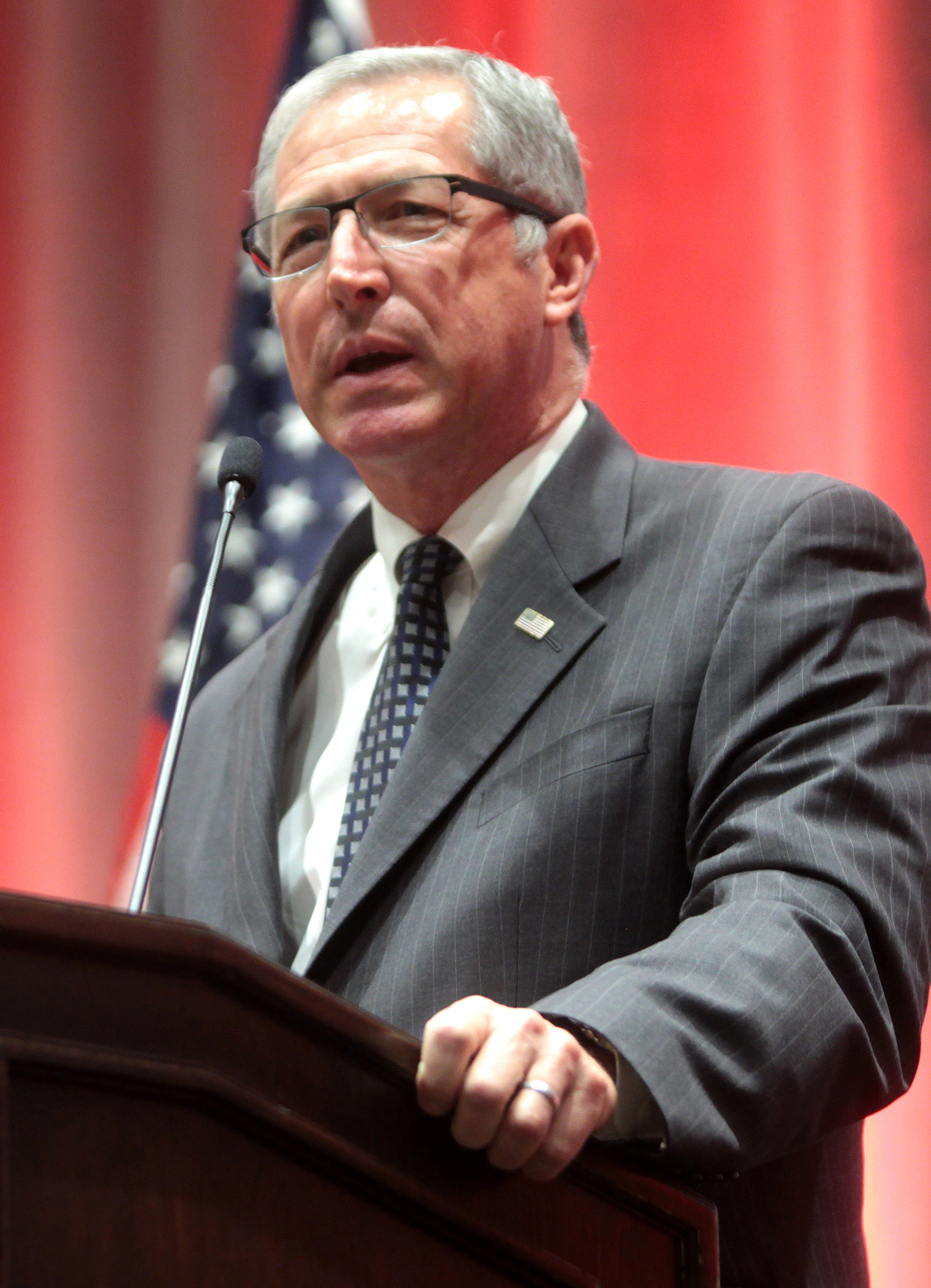
- Little in 2014

Arizona Corporation Commissioner
- In office January 5, 2015 – October 2, 2017
- Preceded by: Susan Bitter Smith
- Succeeded by: Justin Olson

Personal details
- Born: May 11, 1956 (age 70) Texas, U.S.
- Party: Republican
- Spouse: Linda Little
- Children: Micaela Little
- Profession: Software industry
- Website: www.azcc.gov/commissioners/DLittle/default.html

Doug Little (born May 11, 1956) is an American software industry executive and politician who served as a member of the Arizona Corporation Commission from 2015 to 2017. Little was elected to the Commission alongside Thomas Forese in the 2014 midterm elections. Little is a member of the Republican Party. He resigned his position on the commission on October 2, 2017, to accept a position with the U.S. Department of Energy.

== Early career ==
Beginning his career, Doug Little spent thirty years in the computer software industry, and was involved with companies such as Oracle, Borland, and Micro Focus International. Additionally, Little spent nearly fifteen years working on large-scale projects with construction, energy and telecommunication companies including, Fluor Corporation, AT&T, Chevron, Southern California Edison, and PG&E.

== Arizona Corporation Commission ==
In 2014, Little campaigned for a position on the Arizona Corporation Commission alongside State Representative Thomas Forese, winning the 2014 midterm election together in November 2014. Little was sworn in, as a Commissioner in January 2015.

He is also a member of the NARUC Electricity Committee, the Critical Infrastructure Subcommittee, and was appointed to serve on the Task Force on Telecommunication Act Modernization. He also represents the ACC on the Western Energy Imbalance Market Body of State Regulators, and he is a participant in the Western Interconnection Regional Advisory Board. He is also a member of the Harvard Electricity Policy Group and the Critical Consumer Issues Forum.

Doug Little served as Chairman of the Arizona Corporation Commission. He resigned on October 2, 2017, in order to take a position with the U.S. Department of Energy.

== Personal life ==
Doug Little and his wife, Linda, and their daughter, Micaela, currently live in the northeast valley of Phoenix, and have lived in Arizona for nearly two decades.
