= Arizona Department of Economic Security =

Government agency

Agency overview
- Jurisdiction: Arizona
- Headquarters: 1789 W. Jefferson St., Phoenix, Arizona 85007
- Agency executive: Michael Wisehart, Director
- Parent agency: State of Arizona; Established 1972
- Website: https://des.az.gov/

The Arizona Department of Economic Security (DES) is a government agency of the State of Arizona. DES works with families, community organizations, advocates and state and federal partners to realize our collective vision that every child, adult, and family in Arizona will be safe and economically secure.

DES works to promote enhanced safety and well-being for Arizonans by focusing on three primary goals:

- Strengthening individuals and families;
- Increasing self-sufficiency; and,
- Developing the capacity of communities.
