= Doug Ducey =

Governor of Arizona from 2015 to 2023

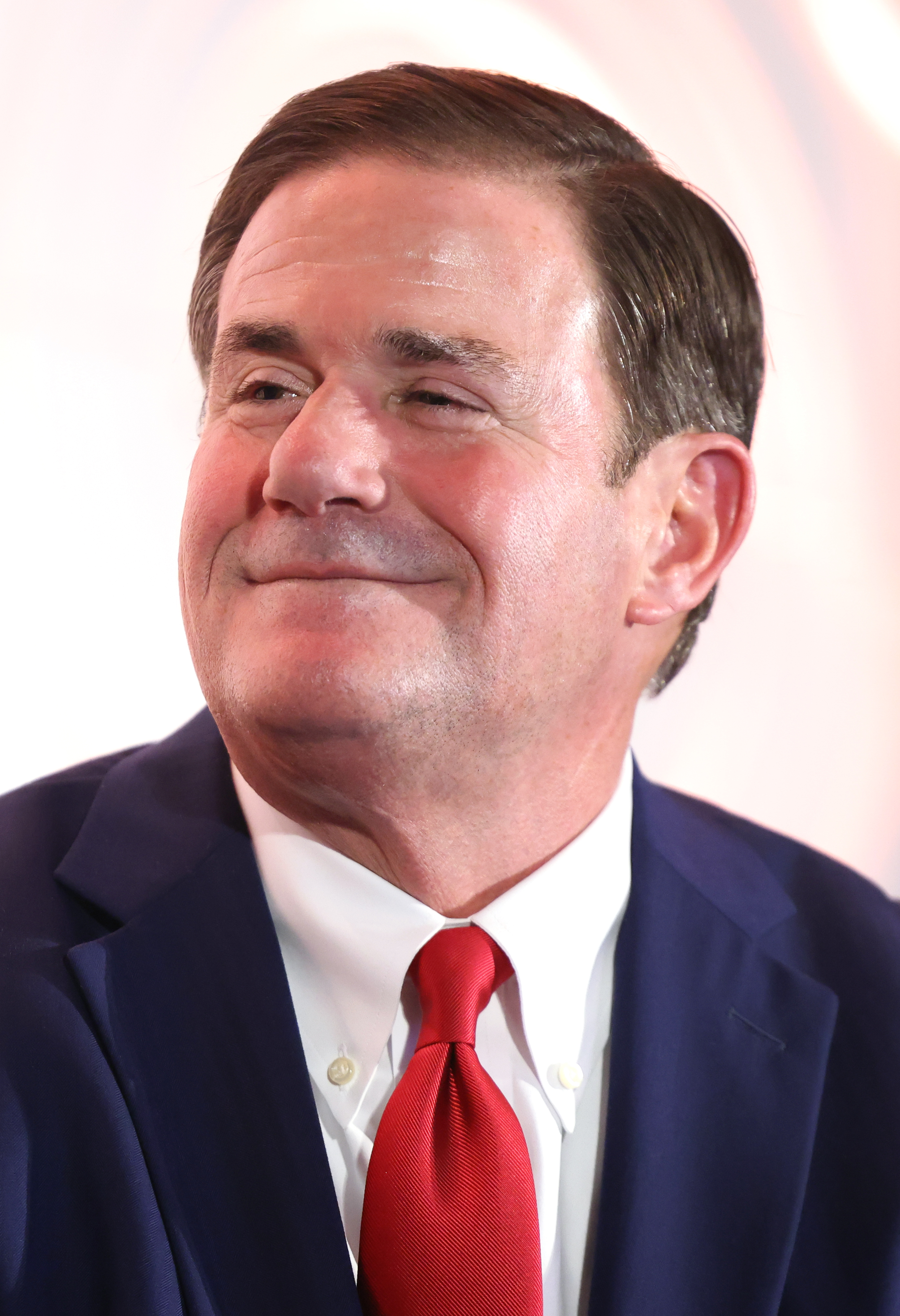
- Ducey in 2024

23rd Governor of Arizona
- In office January 5, 2015 – January 2, 2023
- Preceded by: Jan Brewer
- Succeeded by: Katie Hobbs

Chair of the Republican Governors Association
- In office December 9, 2020 – November 17, 2022 Serving with Pete Ricketts (2021–2022)
- Preceded by: Greg Abbott
- Succeeded by: Kim Reynolds

42nd Treasurer of Arizona
- In office January 3, 2011 – January 5, 2015
- Governor: Jan Brewer
- Preceded by: Dean Martin
- Succeeded by: Jeff DeWit

Personal details
- Born: Douglas Anthony Roscoe Jr. April 9, 1964 (age 62) Toledo, Ohio, U.S.
- Party: Republican
- Spouse: Angela Herbert (m. 1992)
- Children: 3
- Education: Arizona State University, Tempe (BS)

Douglas Anthony Ducey (/ˈduːsi/ DOO-see; né Roscoe Jr.; born April 9, 1964) is an American businessman and Republican politician who served as the 23rd governor of Arizona from 2015 to 2023 as well as Arizona State Treasurer from 2011 to 2015. He also was CEO of the ice cream parlor chain Cold Stone Creamery from 1995 to 2007.

Originally from Ohio, Ducey moved to Arizona to attend Arizona State University (ASU), where he earned a Bachelor of Science degree in finance. He began a career in sales and marketing and became chief executive officer of Cold Stone Creamery in 1995. He sold the company in 2007 and was elected Arizona state treasurer in 2010. Ducey won the 2014 Arizona Republican primary for Governor of Arizona and defeated Democratic businessman Fred DuVal in the general election; he took office on January 5, 2015. He was reelected by a wide margin in 2018, defeating Democratic nominee David Garcia.

Ducey's fellow Republican governors elected him chair of the Republican Governors Association for 2021 and co-chair in 2022. Ducey had been mentioned as a possible candidate for the U.S. Senate, but declined to run in the 2024 election against incumbent Kyrsten Sinema. He left office on January 2, 2023, and was succeeded by Democrat Katie Hobbs. In June 2023, he was announced as CEO of Citizens for Free Enterprise, a political action committee focused on economic freedom.

== Early life and education ==
Ducey was born and raised in Toledo, Ohio. He is the son of Madeline Scott and Douglas Roscoe, a former member of the Toledo Police Department.

His parents divorced and in 1975 his mother married businessman Michael Ducey, to whom she remained married until 1981. Michael Ducey adopted Roscoe and his siblings in 1976; Roscoe's last name was legally changed to his adoptive father's.

Ducey graduated from St. John's Jesuit High School in 1982 and moved to Arizona to attend Arizona State University (ASU) while working at Hensley & Co., the Anheuser-Busch distributor owned by the family of Cindy McCain. He graduated in 1986 with a Bachelor of Science degree in finance.

== Career ==
=== Business ===
After graduating from ASU, Ducey joined Procter & Gamble and began a career in sales and marketing. Ducey worked as the CEO of Cold Stone Creamery from 1995 to 2007. When he and his business partner sold the company in 2007, Cold Stone had more than 1,400 locations in the United States and ten other countries. After the company's sale to Kahala, accusations of franchise mismanagement led Ducey to leave the organization.

He became the lead investor and was chairman of the board of iMemories, a photo and home movie digitizing service, from 2008 to 2012.

=== State Treasurer of Arizona (2011–2015) ===
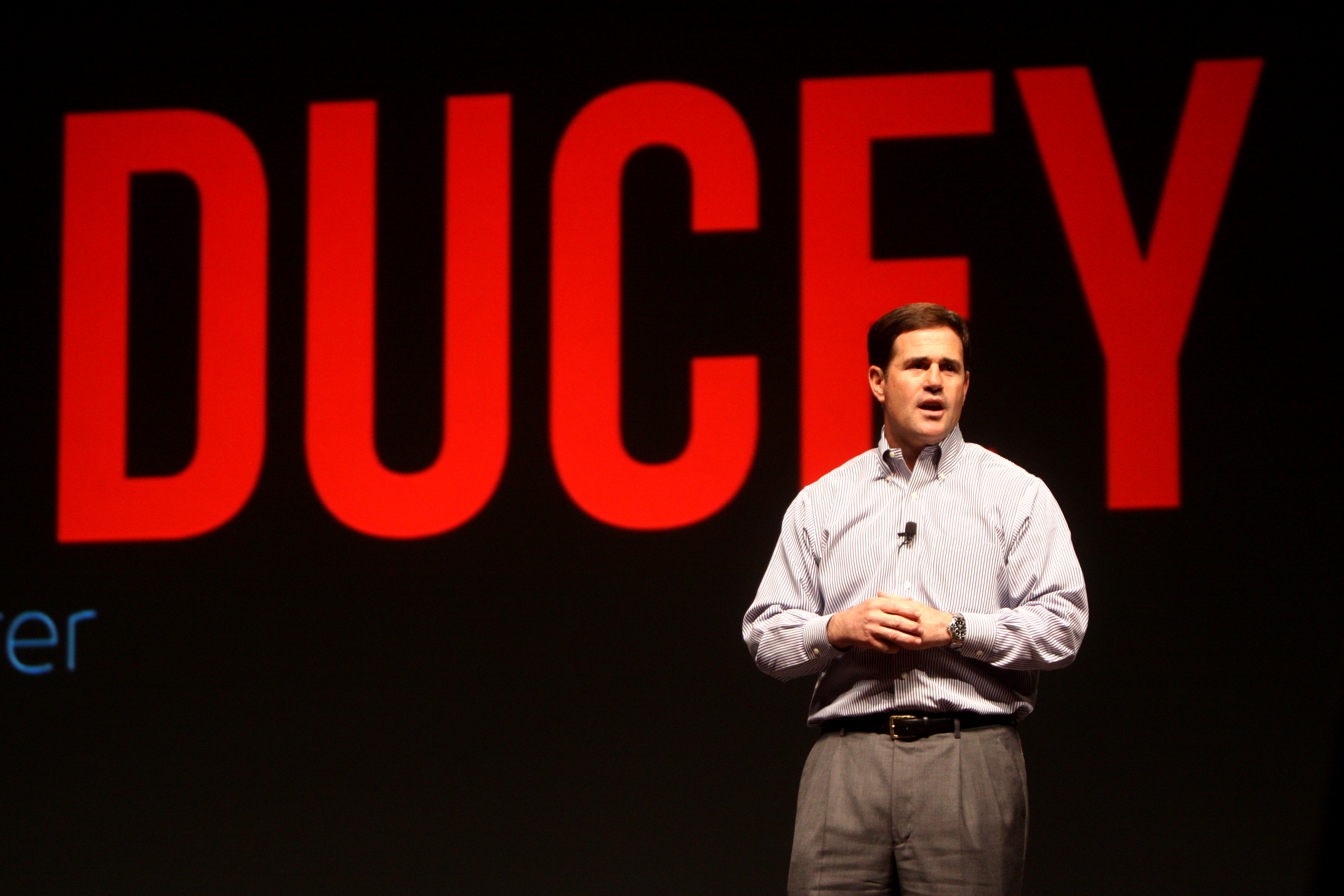
Ducey speaking to a political action committee in 2012

In 2010 Ducey was elected state treasurer of Arizona, replacing Dean Martin. As Arizona's chief banker and investment officer, Ducey oversaw more than $12 billion in state assets and was an investment manager for local governments. The Treasurer serves as the chairman of Arizona's State Board of Investment and State Loan Commission, and as the state's surveyor general and a member of the State Land Selection Board. Ducey also served as the western region vice president for the National Association of State Treasurers, and was the president of the Western State Treasurers' Association.

During his tenure as state treasurer, Ducey created and championed Arizona Proposition 118, a ballot measure to simplify how schools receive funding from Arizona’s State Land Trust. Arizona voters passed Proposition 118 in 2012.

In 2010, Ducey opposed Proposition 204, an effort to create a permanent 1-cent-per-dollar sales tax for public education, transportation and health services. He formally launched a campaign to defeat the proposition, saying, "we don’t need the money" and "this money still does nothing to improve education". Proposition 204 failed, with 63.8% of voters opposing it.

== Gubernatorial campaigns ==
=== 2014 campaign ===
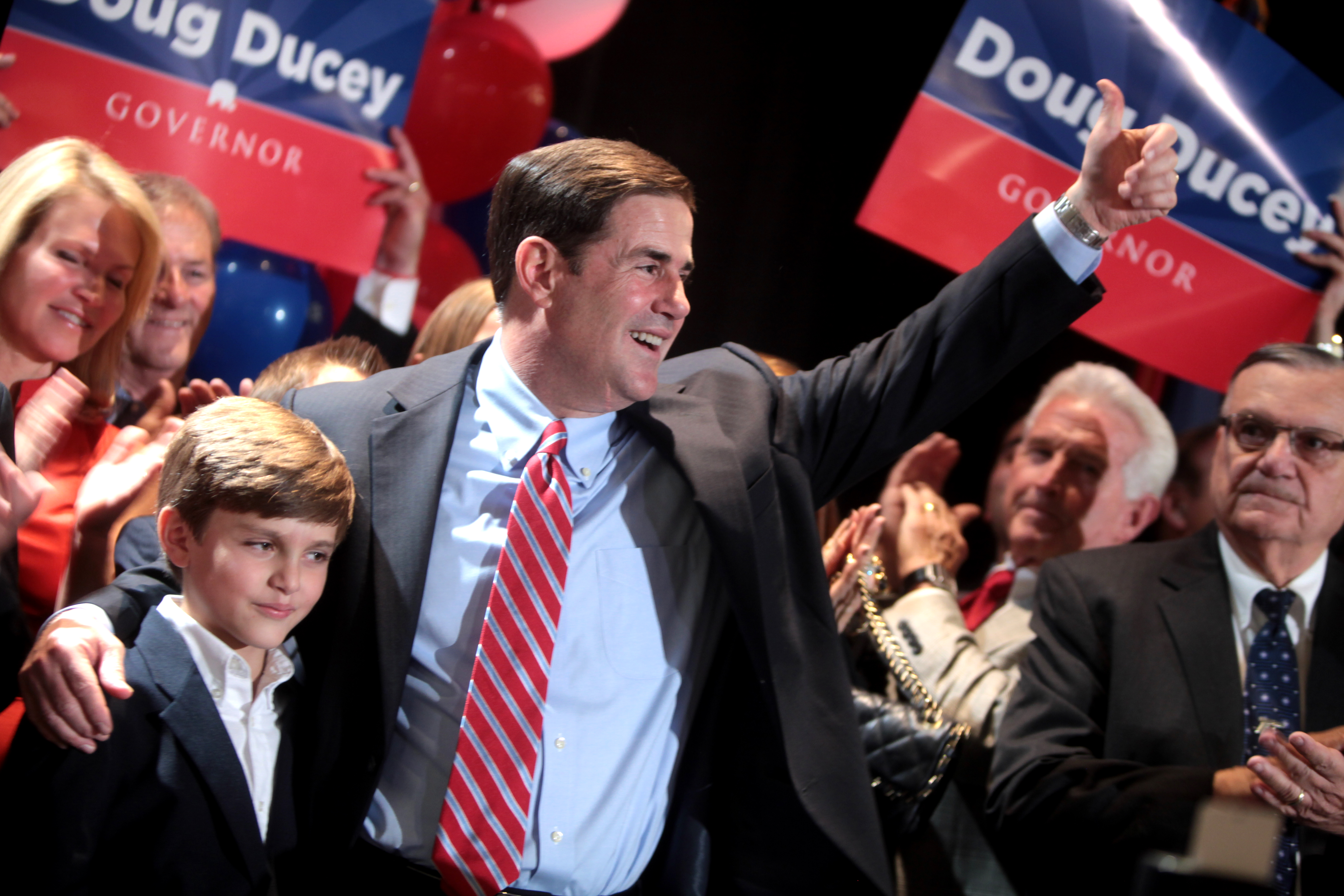
Ducey accepting his party's nomination for governor of Arizona in August 2014.

In July 2013 Ducey filed the paperwork necessary to explore the possibility of running for governor. On February 19, 2014, he formally announced his intention to seek the office at a rally in downtown Phoenix.

He received the endorsement of conservatives such as Senators Ted Cruz and Mike Lee, as well as Wisconsin Governor Scott Walker and former Senator Jon Kyl. Ducey won the Republican nomination in the August primary, and was subsequently endorsed by the outgoing governor, Jan Brewer, along with Senators John McCain and Jeff Flake and other Republicans in Arizona's Congressional delegation. Ducey was endorsed by several organizations, including Arizona Right to Life and the Concerned Women for America.

Ducey defeated Democrat Fred DuVal and Libertarian Barry Hess in the November 4 general election.

=== 2018 campaign ===
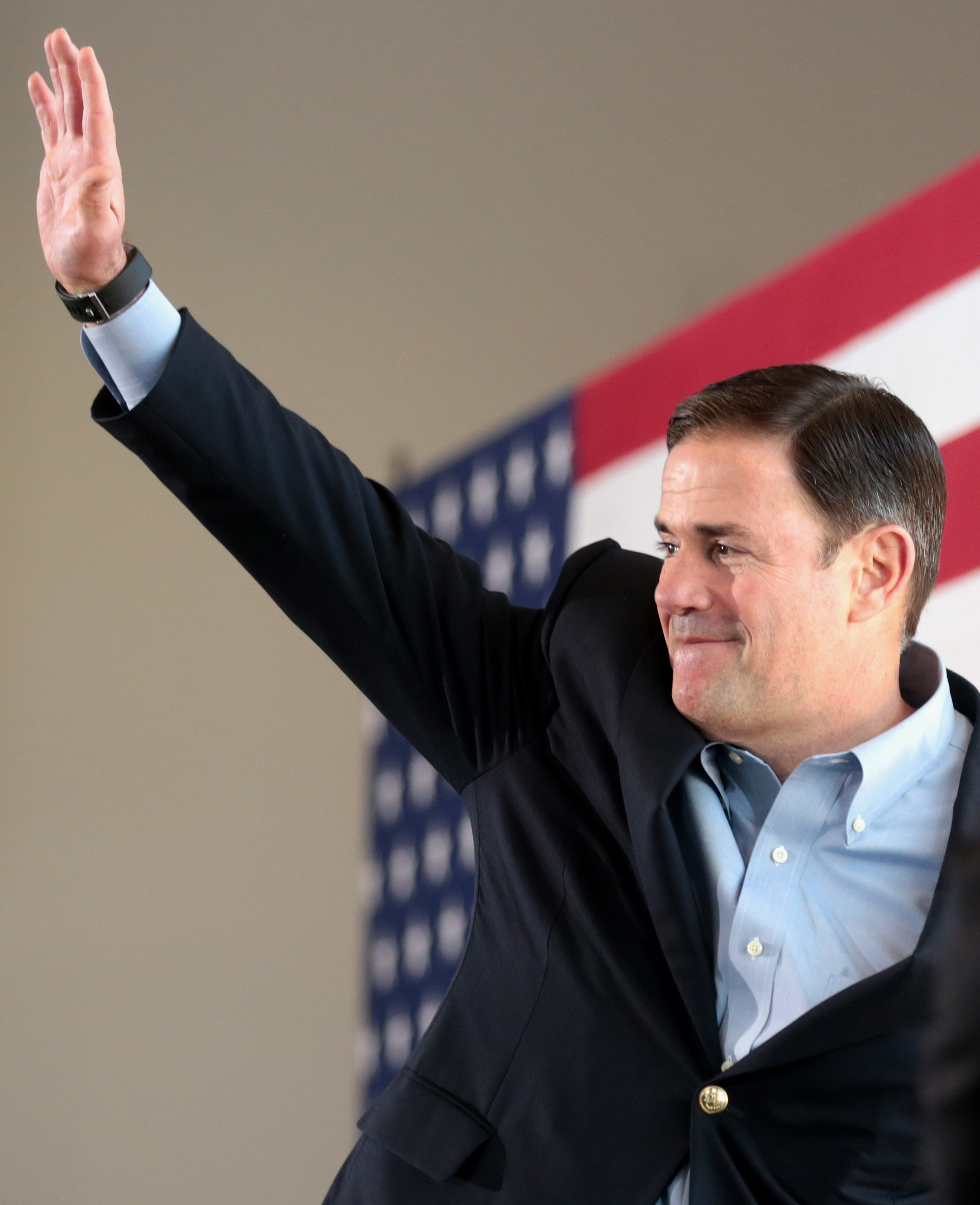
Ducey at a campaign rally in Gilbert, Arizona in October 2018.

In 2018, Ducey announced his candidacy for reelection. Former Arizona Secretary of State Ken Bennett challenged him in the Republican primary and lost by a wide margin. Ducey was reelected in November, defeating Democratic nominee David Garcia, 56%-42%.

== Governor of Arizona (2015–2023) ==
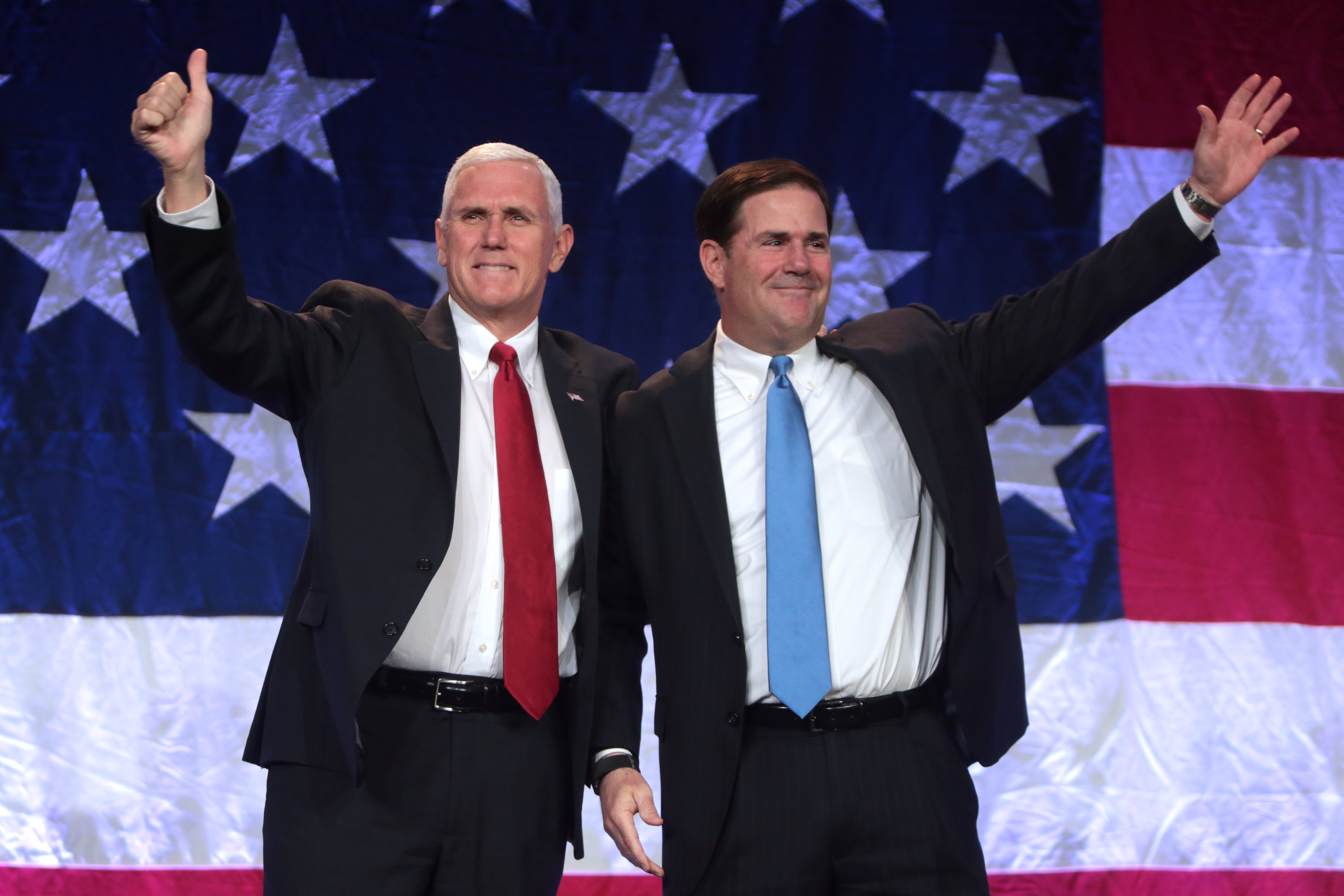
Ducey speaking at a campaign event for Republican presidential nominee Donald Trump in October 2016 with Indiana Governor Mike Pence, the vice-presidential nominee.

Ducey was sworn into office on January 5, 2015. Shortly after his term began, he instituted a state employee hiring freeze in an effort to balance the state budget. In March 2015, Ducey signed a $9.1 billion budget that eliminated the state's $1.5 billion budget deficit by reducing spending without instituting a tax increase. Ducey has issued balanced budget proposals each fiscal year since 2015.

On January 15, 2015, Ducey signed an education bill requiring high school students to pass the U.S. citizenship test in order to graduate, making Arizona the first state to require this.

Ducey issued his first vetoes on March 30, 2015, of HB2150, an amendment to an animal cruelty law that would have excluded livestock animals from protection under that law, and HB2410, which would have prohibited police departments from establishing quotas for traffic citations.

In April 2016, Ducey signed into law legislation that would bar the state from doing business with companies that boycott Israel.

On March 31, 2017, Ducey signed SB1367, which mandates that doctors treat babies born alive during abortions or induced early deliveries. Late-term abortions had previously been performed in rare circumstances where the life of the baby and the mother was at risk; opponents of the bill said that the new restrictions would force doctors to provide pointless treatment to babies that were not expected to live.

On April 6, 2017, Ducey signed a major school voucher expansion bill, extending eligibility to every Arizona student.

On September 4, 2018, it was announced that Ducey had appointed former U.S. Senator Jon Kyl to the U.S. Senate seat that was vacated upon the death of John McCain. Kyl resigned from the Senate effective December 31, 2018, and Ducey appointed outgoing Congresswoman Martha McSally, who had just lost the U.S. Senate race to Kyrsten Sinema, to replace him.

On February 22, 2019, President Donald Trump appointed Ducey to the bipartisan Council of Governors.

In January 2021, Ducey announced that he would not seek the Republican nomination for the U.S. Senate in the 2022 election.

Leaving office on January 2, 2023, Ducey became Arizona's first Governor since Bruce Babbitt in 1986 who had fully served two four-year terms.

=== Education ===
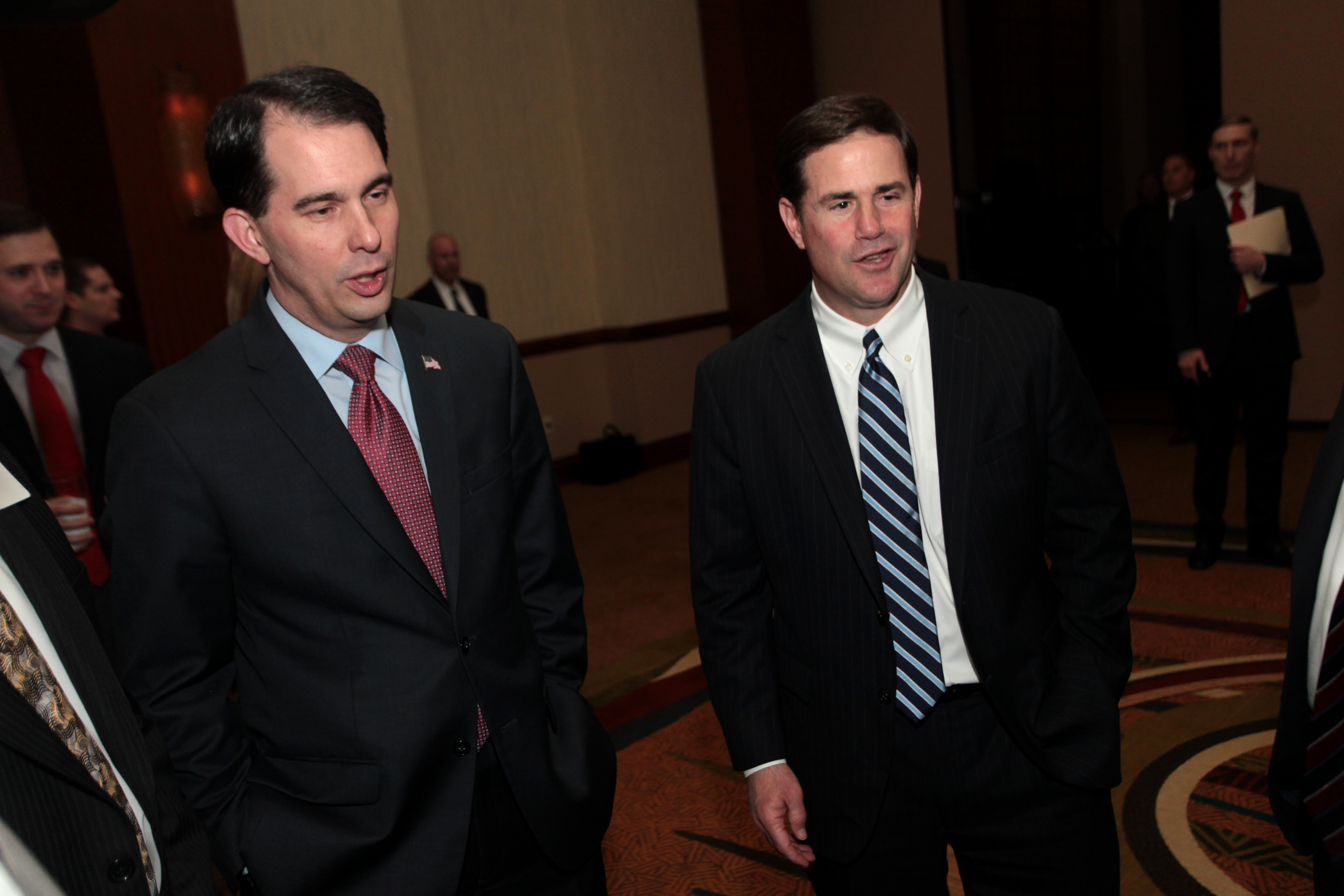
Ducey with Wisconsin governor Scott Walker in March 2015

After cuts to education during the Great Recession, Ducey increased funding to K-12 schools above inflation every year during his tenure. Since 2015, Arizona has added $4.5 billion in total new investments into schools and increased K-12 public school funding by $2.3 billion annually.

In 2015, Ducey led the campaign to pass Proposition 123, putting $3.5 billion into K-12 education over 10 years. The proposition, which passed the state legislature and was approved by voters, also settled a years-long lawsuit about education funding.

In 2018, in response to nationwide teacher protests, Ducey announced the "20x2020" plan, which would raise teacher salaries 20% over three years and restore Recession-era cuts to flexible school funding known as additional assistance. The promise was fulfilled on schedule through the fiscal year 2021 budget, which included $645 million in permanent funding for teacher raises. The promised restoration of additional assistance dollars has taken place ahead of schedule.

Also in 2018, Ducey signed a 20-year extension of Proposition 301, a voter-approved initiative passed in 2000 and championed by then-Governor Jane Hull. The proposition provides about $667 million annually to Arizona’s K-12 public schools, universities, community colleges, and tribal schools through a 0.6% sales tax.

In 2017, Ducey implemented the first-ever dedicated funding for school counselors and the establishment of the Arizona Teachers Academy, a partnership with Arizona State University, University of Arizona, and Northern Arizona University that enables future Arizona public school teachers to graduate with a teaching degree debt-free.

=== Civics ===
On January 16, 2015, Ducey signed the American Civics Act, which requires that all Arizona students pass a basic civics test before graduating from high school. It was the first bill he signed, making Arizona the first state in the country to enact such a law. Since its enactment, 34 states have passed similar legislation.

In 2018, Ducey proclaimed September 25 the inaugural Sandra Day O'Connor Civics Celebration Day, in honor of Sandra Day O’Connor’s dedication to civics and her swearing-in to the Supreme Court on September 25, 1981. In March 2020, he signed into law the Civics Celebration Day bill, which requires schools to dedicate the majority of classroom instruction to civics on September 25.

=== Patient Protection and Affordable Care Act ===
Ducey opposed the Affordable Care Act, saying, "It's no secret Obamacare has been a disaster for Arizona and that I want it repealed and replaced." On July 30, 2017, the Arizona Republic reported that Ducey had urged Senators Jeff Flake and John McCain to vote for legislation to repeal and replace it. McCain ultimately voted against repeal.

In September 2017, Ducey released a statement endorsing the Graham–Cassidy health care amendment as "the best path forward to repeal and replace Obamacare." On September 20, he said his staff was analyzing the Graham–Cassidy bill's effects on the Arizona Health Care Cost Containment System and asserted that the ACA had been a failure. He admitted he had not seen the final version of the bill but said he suspected it would be “the longest possible transition so that we can move people from Medicaid into a superior insurance product."

=== Confederate monuments ===
In August 2017, after violence by protesters at a gathering in Charlottesville, Virginia, Ducey said in response to a reporter's question that he had no interest in removing Confederate monuments from public lands in Arizona. He condemned groups like the Ku Klux Klan and Neo-Nazis and said, "It's important that people know our history... I don't think we should try to hide our history."

=== LGBT rights and same-sex marriage ===
As a candidate, Ducey opposed same-sex marriage as well as domestic partnerships for unmarried couples. As governor, in 2015, he supported allowing same-sex couples to adopt children. After same-sex marriage was legalized by the U.S. Supreme Court decision Obergefell v. Hodges, Ducey said the state would comply with the law and that there were good people on both sides of the issue. In 2017, he said he would not ask the legislature to pass anti-discrimination laws, but added that he opposed discrimination based on sexual orientation. In April 2019, he signed into law a bill that repealed the sex and health education laws that prohibited the "promotion" of homosexuality as an acceptable "lifestyle".

In March 2022, Ducey signed two transgender-related bills into law. One bans transgender people from playing on school sports teams aligning with their gender identity rather than their biological sex. One bars people under 18 from receiving sex-reassignment surgeries.

=== State firings ===
Under Ducey, the state government was mandated to "shrink", which led Ducey-appointed administrator Tim Jeffries to fire over 400 state employees at the Arizona Department of Economic Security (DES). Ducey then prohibited DES leadership from firing employees. The employees were fired for infractions such as questioning leadership for sending purportedly political emails on government systems. Fired employees were able to petition for reconsideration of their firings with the state HR chief, but did not have the rights in employment they once did because of a law signed by Governor Brewer that converted them to at-will employment in return for bonuses.

=== State land trust ===
Ducey was a major proponent of AZ Prop 123, which slowly took more money from the state land trust to settle a lawsuit that a judge ruled deprived students and teachers of adequate education funding as mandated by Arizona voters. The Arizona legislature violated the law by funding education in the state below the level required by AZ Prop 301, which passed in 2000. Prop 123 settled the lawsuit without raising revenue by increasing distributions from the land trust the federal government bequeathed to Arizona at statehood. The law passed amid controversy, and many teachers were promised small raises only if the law passed, creating an emergent political issue. With a strong Republican majority, it was not considered politically possible to raise revenue to fund education to the level required, so Prop 123 represented a grand compromise.

=== Judicial appointments ===
As governor, Ducey signed legislation to expand the Arizona Supreme Court, seating two additional justices of his choosing. In doing so, he denied that he was "packing the court". The legislation was "championed by Republicans but decried by Democrats as an effort by the governor to pack the court with his nominees." In November 2016, Ducey appointed Arizona Court of Appeals Judge Andrew Gould and state Solicitor General John Lopez IV to the two new seats. Lopez is the state's first Latino justice.

As of April 2020, Ducey has made 71 judicial appointments, more than any other Arizona governor, surpassing a record previously held by Bruce Babbitt. In January 2016, Ducey appointed Clint Bolick to the Arizona Supreme Court. Before his appointment, Bolick worked as an attorney for the conservative Goldwater Institute. In April 2019, Ducey appointed Court of Appeals Judge James Beene to the Arizona Supreme Court.

In September 2019, Ducey controversially appointed Maricopa County Attorney Bill Montgomery to the Arizona Supreme Court. The nomination occurred after Ducey replaced several members of the state's judicial nominating commission, who had refused to submit Montgomery's name for a vacancy earlier in the year.

In July 2021, Ducey appointed his former deputy general counsel, Kathryn Hackett King, to succeed Gould on the Supreme Court. King is the court's fifth female justice and the first appointed by Ducey.

Ducey has also appointed several judges to state appellate and trial courts. In 2017, he became the first governor since 1991 to appoint a judge from the opposing political party to the Arizona Court of Appeals.

=== Unemployment benefits ===
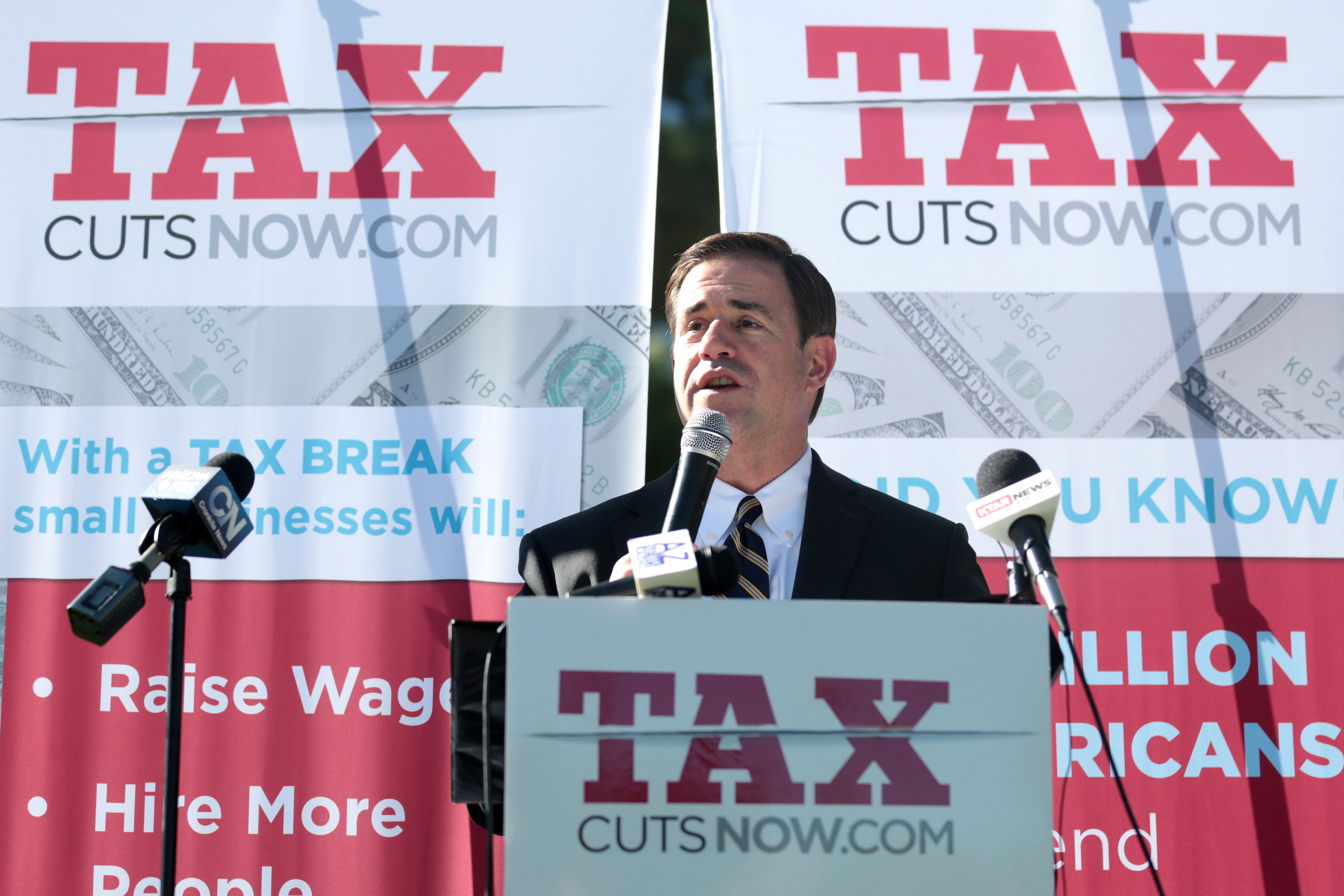
Ducey speaking at a "Tax Cuts Now" rally in Phoenix, November 2017

In May 2018, Ducey signed into law a bill that requires people who collect unemployment benefits for more than four weeks to take any job that pays 20% more than the unemployment benefits. Unemployment benefits in Arizona are capped at $240 a week or half what people earned before they were laid off. The new legislation means that people must take jobs paying $288 a week (about $15,000 a year) regardless of what they used to make.

=== Marijuana legalization ===
Ducey opposed a 2016 ballot measure to legalize cannabis for recreational use in Arizona. He stated that he didn't think "any state became stronger by being stoned" and helped raise funds in support of the initiative's opposition campaign. Ducey also opposed a similar ballot measure in 2020 (Proposition 207) which was approved with 60% of the vote.

=== COVID-19 pandemic ===
The Arizona Department of Health Services announced the first case of COVID-19 in Arizona on January 26, 2020, a student at Arizona State University who returned from Wuhan, China. The number of cases rose to nine by mid-March. On March 11, Ducey declared a state of emergency and activated the state's emergency operations center. He also issued executive orders directing the state health department to issue emergency rules to protect residents living in nursing homes and group homes. On March 15, Ducey and State Superintendent of Public Instruction Kathy Hoffman jointly announced a statewide school closure.

On March 30, 2020, Ducey issued a stay-at-home order for one month until April 30. On April 29, he extended the stay-at-home order until May 15. On May 12, Arizona began allowing certain businesses to reopen; both the lockdown and reopening were later cited in two recall efforts against Ducey. The reopening contradicted the advice of academic experts. At the same time Ducey was reopening the state, he ended cooperation with a team of epidemiologists and statisticians from the University of Arizona and Arizona State University. After public criticism, the department resumed the cooperation.

In May 2020, Arizona sought a uniform approach to COVID-19 with consistent mitigation requirements statewide. On June 15, mayors and local governments requested the power to move forward with localized face mask ordinances, including a letter to Ducey from mayors of border towns. Ducey gave mayors that power on June 17. Since then, five counties and 47 cities and towns have issued face mask requirements covering more than 90% of Arizona residents. In July, Arizona launched a program to provide free masks to senior citizens and people with medical conditions.

By June 2020, Arizona had become an epicenter of the pandemic. Public health experts said that was predictable given Arizona's failures to implement public health precautions and decisions by top officials. Arizona's COVID-19 cases increased significantly in June after Memorial Day celebrations, the reopening of businesses, and several weeks of protests over racial injustice over the murder of George Floyd. Ducey was criticized for the state's failure to require social distancing, mask wearing and other restrictions.

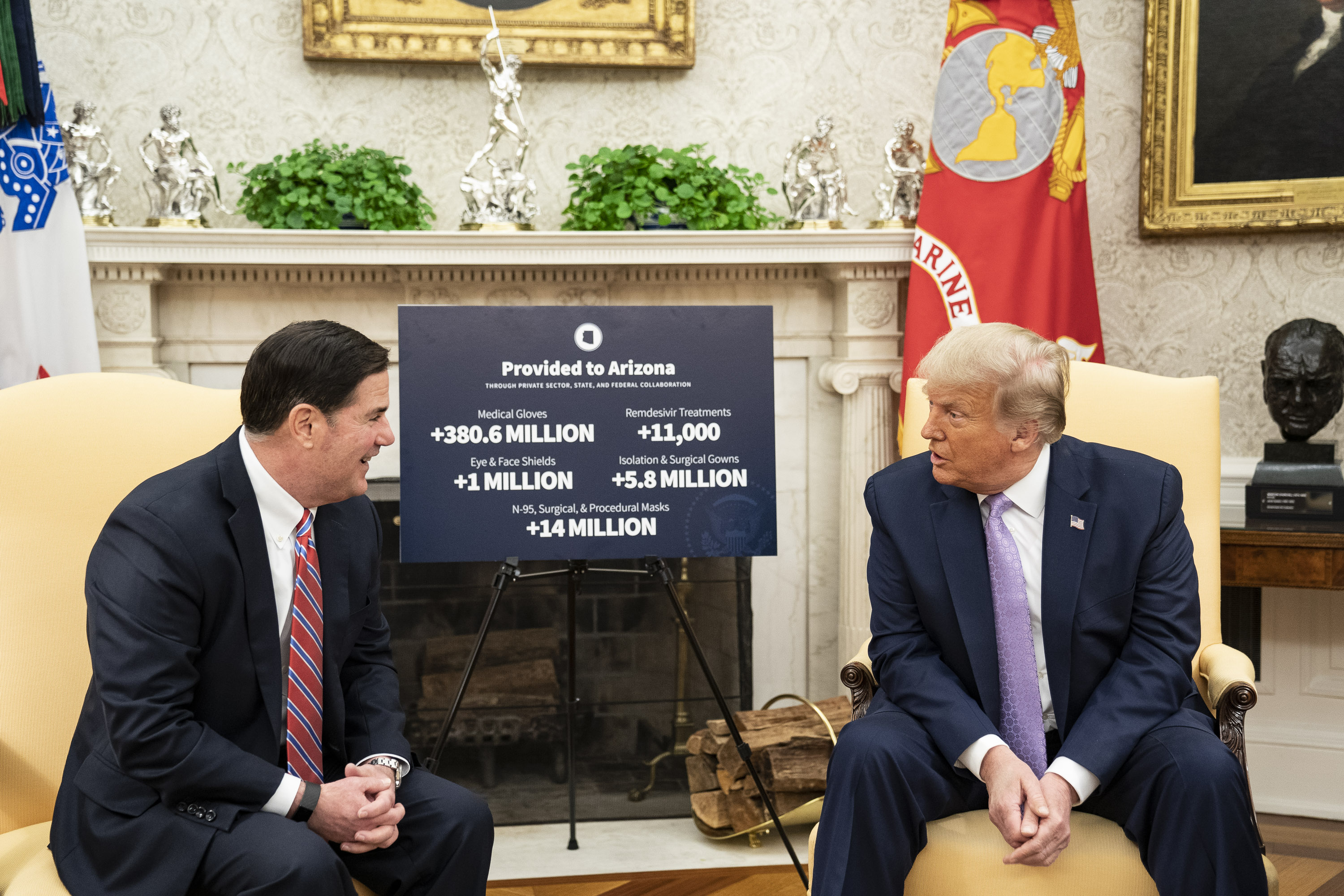
Ducey meets with President Trump in the Oval Office of the White House in August 2020 to discuss coronavirus efforts in Arizona.

On June 29, 2020, Ducey ordered some businesses that had reopened, including bars, gyms, and waterparks, to close for 30 days. The order also prohibited large gatherings of more than 50 people. Although Arizona activated a hospital crisis standards of care plan that allowed hospitals to maximize surge staffing and capacity, no hospitals reported rationing health care at the state's infection peak.

On August 6, Ducey, State Superintendent Kathy Hoffman, and the Arizona Department of Health Services released public health benchmarks for reopening schools. The school benchmarks track COVID-19 statistics by county, including cases per 100,000 people over two weeks, low rates of positive tests, and declining COVID-19 cases in hospitals, for schools to meet before moving to hybrid or fully in-person instruction. Eleven counties met the benchmarks for hybrid schooling in September. On August 10, Arizona's health department released similar benchmarks for reopening higher-risk businesses such as bars, gyms, and movie theaters.

Due to unhappiness with Ducey's handling of the COVID-19 pandemic, some constituents filed recall petitions against him. One such group, Arizonans for Liberty, a largely conservative group believing that Ducey infringed on personal freedoms with lockdowns in late March 2020, filed on May 1, 2020; the group did not publish estimates of the number of signatures collected, but failed to collect enough signatures to initiate a recall. Another group, Accountable Arizona, a nonpartisan, grassroots movement believing that Ducey had not done enough to combat the pandemic, filed on September 18, 2020, and gathered over 150,000 signatures before their January 16 deadline, but far fewer than the 594,111 required to trigger a recall election.

On March 3, 2021, Ducey ordered all Arizona schools to offer in-person learning by March 15, with exceptions for counties with high transmission rates, including Pinal, Coconino, and Yavapai. On March 5, after a decrease in cases and deaths, Ducey lifted specific capacity limits on businesses, and made it easier for baseball games to reopen. On March 25, he removed all restrictions, allowing bars and other businesses to operate at 100% capacity, and barred counties and cities from issuing mask mandates. Later in the year, Ducey challenged an Arizona school district that required unvaccinated students who had been exposed to COVID-19 to quarantine for 10 days. He also said that schools that required mask wearing would be excluded from new education grants.

=== Voting rights ===
After the 2020 presidential election, Ducey signed legislation that purges voters from the vote-by-mail system unless they voted by mail every two years. The bill was estimated to lead to the immediate removal of 100,000 to 200,000 voters from the vote-by-mail system. In 2021, Ducey signed legislation that would prevent mail-in voters from fixing missing signatures on their ballots after election day.

=== Border wall ===
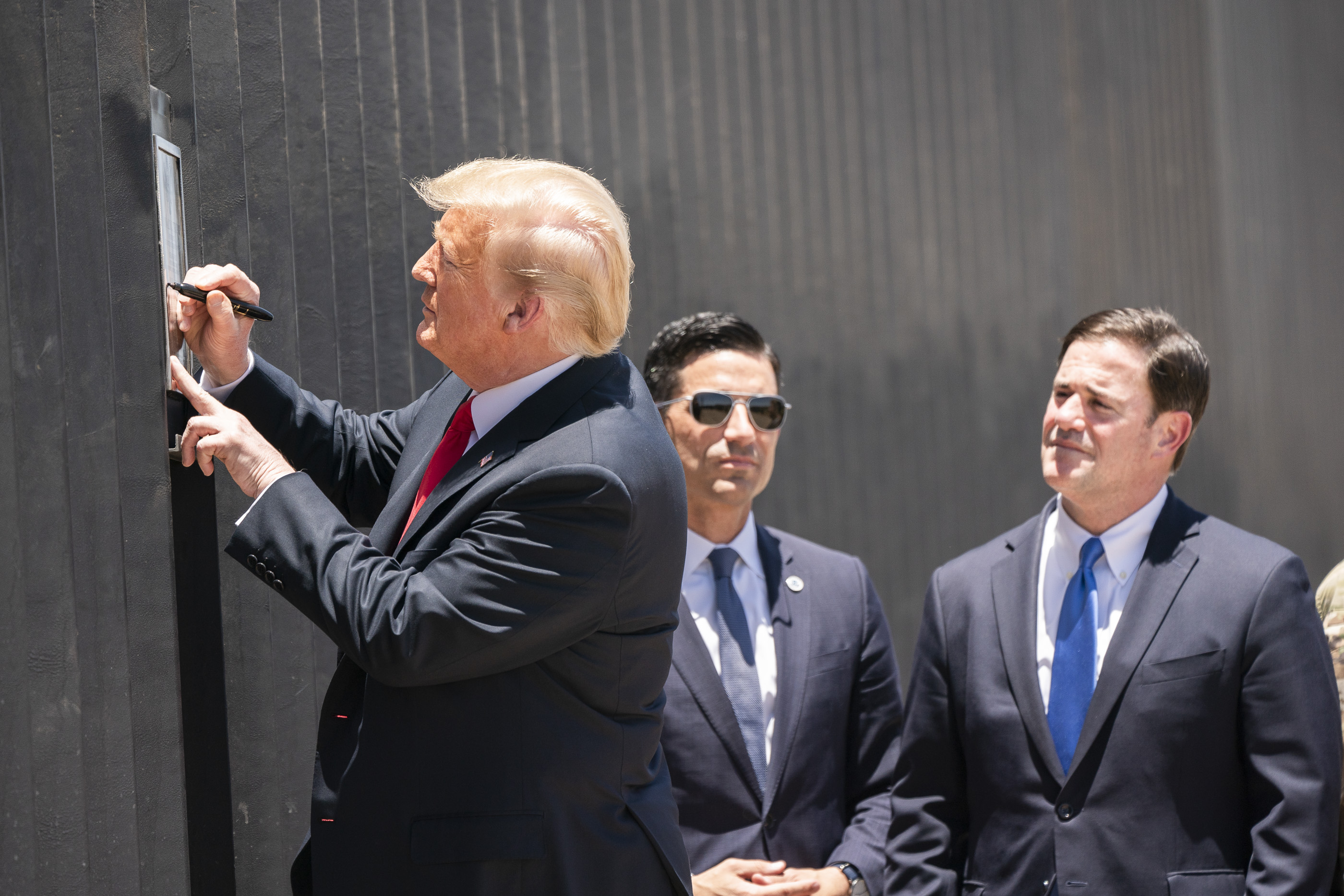
Ducey watches as President Trump signs a plaque at the southern border wall in June 2020

In the last weeks of his administration, Ducey ordered the construction of an impromptu wall made of shipping containers in Cochise County on the Mexico–U.S. border. The wall was being built in contravention of federal law in the Coronado National Forest, without the authorization of the United States Forest Service, which owns the land. His successor Katie Hobbs has pledged to remove the wall. The sheriff of neighboring Santa Cruz County has advocated for federal agents to seize vehicles associated with the project to enforce federal law. On December 21, 2022, Ducey reached an agreement with the Biden administration to stop building and begin dismantling the border wall.

=== Approval rating ===
In May 2015, Ducey's fifth month in office, a poll found his approval rating was just 27 percent statewide, which was likely due to mixed support among Arizona Republicans. For most of his tenure as governor, Ducey maintained 40–50 percent approval on average.

== Personal life ==
Ducey met his wife, Angela, while attending Arizona State University. They live in Paradise Valley with their three sons. Ducey is a lifelong member of the Catholic Church.

== Electoral history ==
Arizona Treasurer election, 2010
Party	Candidate	Votes	%	±%
Republican	Doug Ducey	859,672	51.9	−4.84
Democratic	Andrei Cherny	685,865	41.4	−1.93
Libertarian	Thane Eichenauer	66,166	4	n/a
Green	Angel Torres	50,962	2.1	n/a
Total votes		1,448,328	100	
Republican hold				

Republican primary results, 2014
Party	Candidate	Votes	%
Republican	Doug Ducey	200,607	37.1
Republican	Scott Smith	119,107	22.0
Republican	Christine Jones	89,922	16.6
Republican	Ken Bennett	62,010	11.5
Republican	Andrew Thomas	43,822	8.1
Republican	Frank Riggs	24,168	4.5
Republican	Write-in	1,804	0.3
Total votes		541,440	100

Arizona gubernatorial election, 2014
Party	Candidate	Votes	%	±%
Republican	Doug Ducey	805,062	53.4	−0.9
Democratic	Fred DuVal	626,921	41.6	−0.8
Libertarian	Barry Hess	57,337	3.8	+1.6
Americans Elect	John Lewis Mealer	15,432	1.0	n/a
None	J. Johnson (write-in)	1,520	0.1	n/a
Independent	Brian Bailey (write-in)	50	nil	n/a
Republican	Alice Novoa (write-in)	43	nil	n/a
Independent	Cary Dolego (write-in)	29	nil	n/a
None	Curtis Woolsey (write-in)	15	nil	n/a
Independent	Diane-Elizabeth R.R. Kennedy (write-in)	7	nil	n/a
Total votes		1,506,416	100	n/a
Republican hold				

Republican primary results, 2018
Party	Candidate	Votes	%
Republican	Doug Ducey (incumbent)	463,672	70.7
Republican	Ken Bennett	191,775	29.3
Republican	Robert Weber (write-in)	91	nil
Total votes		655,538	100

Arizona gubernatorial election, 2018
Party	Candidate	Votes	%	±%
Republican	Doug Ducey (incumbent)	1,330,863	56.0	+2.6
Democratic	David Garcia	994,341	41.8	+0.2
Green	Angel Torres	50,962	2.1	n/a
None	Patrick Masoya (write-in)	177	nil	n/a
None	Christian Komor (write-in)	66	nil	n/a
Green	Cary D. Dolego (write-in)	13	nil	n/a
Republican Takeover	Rafiel Vega (write-in)	12	nil	n/a
Humanitarian	Brandon "The Tucc" Bartuccio (write-in)	7	nil	n/a
Total votes		2,376,441	100	n/a
Republican hold				

Political offices
Preceded by Dean Martin	Treasurer of Arizona; 2011–2015	Succeeded by Jeff DeWit
Preceded by Jan Brewer	Governor of Arizona; 2015–2023	Succeeded by Katie Hobbs
Party political offices
Preceded by Jan Brewer	Republican nominee for Governor of Arizona; 2014, 2018	Succeeded by Kari Lake
Preceded by Greg Abbott	Chair of the Republican Governors Association; 2020–2022; Served alongside: Pete Ricketts	Succeeded by Kim Reynolds
U.S. order of precedence (ceremonial)
Preceded by Jan Brewer as Former Governor	Order of precedence of the United States; Within Arizona	Succeeded by Jack Markell as Former Governor
Preceded by Jan Brewer as Former Governor	Order of precedence of the United States; Outside Arizona	Succeeded by Steve Cowper as Former Governor
