= 2026 Arizona State Treasurer election =

- November 3, 2026

| Nominee | Nick Mansour | Elijah Norton |
| Party | Democratic | Republican |
| Popular vote | 1,170,020 | 1,009,322 |
| Percentage | 53.64% | 46.27% |
- Mansour: 50–60% 60–70% 70–80% Norton: 50–60% 60–70% 70–80%
State Treasurer before election
Kimberly Yee
Republican
Elected State Treasurer
Nick Mansour
Democratic

The 2026 Arizona State Treasurer election took place on Tuesday, November 3, 2026, to elect the State Treasurer of Arizona. Two-term Republican incumbent Kimberly Yee was term-limited and instead ran for state superintendent of public instruction. Nick Mansour defeated Elijah Norton, becoming the first Democrat to hold the office of Arizona Treasurer since 1967.

== Republican primary ==
=== Candidates ===
==== Nominee ====
- Elijah Norton, former treasurer of the Arizona Republican Party and candidate for Arizona's 1st congressional district in 2022

==== Eliminated in primary ====
- Katherine Haley, president of the State Board of Education

=== Endorsements ===
Katherine Haley

Organizations

- Maggie's List

=== Polling ===
| Poll source | Date(s) administered | Sample size (Note: Key: A – all adults RV – registered voters LV – likely voters V – unclear) | Margin of error | Katherine Haley | Elijah Norton | Undecided |
|---|---|---|---|---|---|---|
| NextGen Polling | July 8–9, 2026 | 1,707 (LV) | ± 2.5% | 20% | 43% | 37% |
| NextGen Polling | June 16–17, 2026 | 1,683 (RV) | ± 2.5% | 11% | 15% | 73% |

=== Results ===
Primary results by county: Norton: 50–60%; Haley: 50–60%

Republican primary results
| Party | Candidate | Votes | % |
|---|---|---|---|
| Republican | Elijah Norton | 326,944 | 56.4 |
| Republican | Katherine Haley | 252,792 | 43.6 |
| Total votes | | 579,736 | 100.0 |

== Democratic primary ==
=== Candidates ===
==== Nominee ====
- Nick Mansour, former nursing college CEO

=== Endorsements ===
Nick Mansour

U.S. representatives

- Yassamin Ansari, AZ-03 (2025–present)
- Greg Stanton, AZ-04 (2023–present), AZ-09 (2019–2023)

Local officials

- Corey Woods, mayor of Tempe (2020–present)

=== Results ===
Democratic primary results
| Party | Candidate | Votes | % |
|---|---|---|---|
| Democratic | Nick Mansour | 485,793 | 100.0 |
| Total votes | | 485,793 | 100.0 |

== No Labels primary ==
=== Candidates ===
==== Withdrawn ====
- Michael Zepeda, business owner

== General election ==
=== Polling ===
| Poll source | Date(s) administered | Sample size | Margin of error | Elijah Norton (R) | Nick Mansour (D) | Other | Undecided |
|---|---|---|---|---|---|---|---|
| GrayHouse (R) (Note: Poll commissioned by Norton's campaign.) | October 28–29, 2026 | 500 (LV) | ± 4.2% | 47% | 46% | — | — |
| HighGround, Inc. | October 21–25, 2026 | 400 (LV) | ± 4.9% | 41% | 47% | 0% (Note: "Some other candidate" with <1%) | 12% |
| GrayHouse (R) | October 18–20, 2026 | 550 (LV) | ± 4.2% | 50% | 46% | — | 4% |
| HighGround, Inc. | October 6–8, 2026 | 400 (LV) | ± 4.9% | 35% | 45% | 1% (Note: "Some other candidate" with 1%) | 19% |
| Grayhouse (R) | October 6–8, 2026 | 550 (LV) | ± 4.2% | 43% | 41% | — | 16% |
| HighGround, Inc. | August 15–18, 2026 | 400 (LV) | ± 4.9% | 39% | 42% | 0% | 19% |
| Grayhouse (R) | August 11–13, 2026 | 600 (LV) | ± 4.0% | 41% | 39% | – | 20% |
| Stealth Analytics | August 11–13, 2026 | 530 (LV) | ± 4.3% | 39% | 35% | 2% (Note: Michael Zepeda (NL) with 2%) | 23% |

=== Results ===
2026 Arizona State Treasurer election
| Party | Candidate | Votes | % |
|---|---|---|---|
| Democratic | Nick Mansour | 1,170,020 | 53.64% |
| Republican | Elijah Norton | 1,009,322 | 46.27% |
| Write-in | | 1,839 | 0.09% |
| Total votes | | 2,181,181 | 100.0% |
| Democratic gain from Republican | | | |

== Notes ==
Partisan clients
