= 2018 Arizona State Treasurer election =

- November 6, 2018
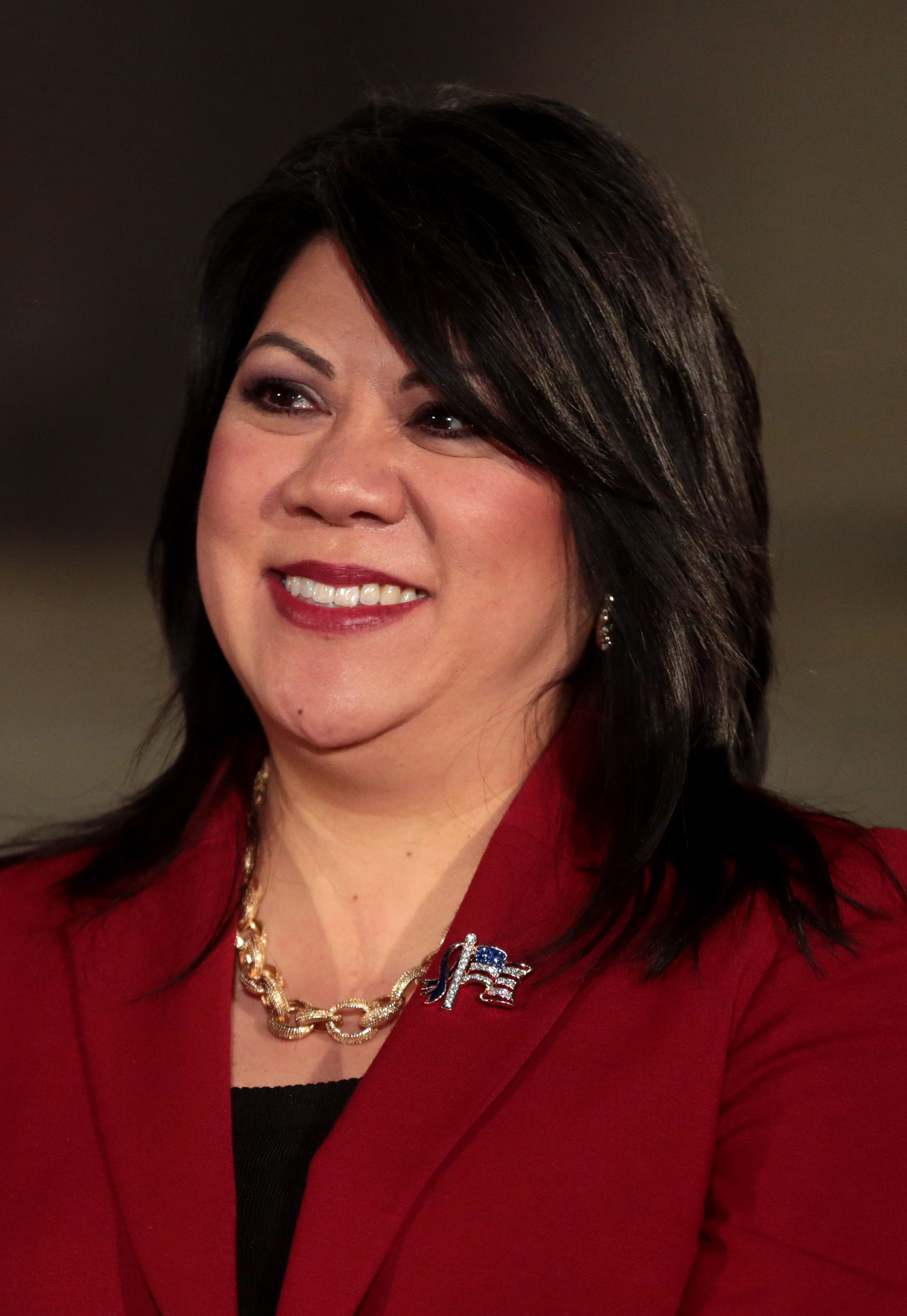

Nominee	Kimberly Yee	Mark Manoil
Party	Republican	Democratic
Popular vote	1,249,120	1,052,197
Percentage	54.28%	45.72%
- County results Yee: 50–60% 60–70% 70–80% Manoli: 50–60% 60–70%
State Treasurer before election
Jeff DeWit
Republican
Elected State Treasurer
Kimberly Yee
Republican

The 2018 Arizona State Treasurer election took place on November 6, 2018, to elect the State Treasurer of Arizona, concurrently with other federal and state elections. Incumbent Republican state treasurer Jeff DeWit announced on April 6, 2016, that he would not run for re-election to a second term as state treasurer. DeWit resigned in April 2018 to become CFO of NASA and his replacement, Eileen Klein, announced that she would not be running for re-election.

== Republican primary ==
=== Candidates ===
==== Nominee ====
- Kimberly Yee, state senator

==== Eliminated in primary ====
- Jo Ann Sabbagh, accountant

===== Withdrew =====
- Thomas Forese, Corporation Commissioner

==== Declined ====
- Jeff DeWitt, incumbent state treasurer

=== Endorsements ===
Thomas Forese

Individuals

- Denny Barmney, Maricopa County Supervisor
- Sal DiCiccio, Phoenix City Councilman
- Bill Gates, Maricopa County Supervisor
- Dave Gowan, Speaker of the House of Representatives
- Sam Huang, Chandler City Councilman
- Terry Roe, Chandler City Councilman
- Jeff Weninger, state representative
Kimberly Yee

Individuals

- Jan Brewer, former governor of Arizona
- Mark Brnovich, current attorney general
- Jeff DeWit, State Treasurer
- Bart Fleming, former state treasurer
- Ernest Garfield, former state treasurer
- Jane Dee Hull, former governor of Arizona
- Carol Springer, former state treasurer

Organizations

- Chandler Chamber of Commerce
- Maggie's List

=== Results ===
Republican primary results
Party	Candidate	Votes	%
Republican	Kimberly Yee	343,743	59.4%
Republican	Jo Ann Sabbagh	235,109	40.6%
Total votes		578,852	100.0%

== Democratic primary ==
=== Candidates ===
==== Nominee ====
- Mark Manoil, attorney and former chairman of the Maricopa County Democratic Party

==== Declined ====
- Mark Cardenas, state representative
- William Mundell, former Corporation Commissioner (ran for Arizona Corporation Commission)

=== Results ===
Democratic primary results
Party	Candidate	Votes	%
Democratic	Mark Manoil	454,581	100.0%
Total votes		454,581	100.0%

== General election ==
=== Polling ===
Poll source	Date(s) administered	Sample size	Margin of error	Kimberly Yee (R)	Mark Manoil (D)	Undecided
Gravis Marketing	September 5–7, 2018	882	± 3.3%	49%	38%	13%
OH Predictive Insights	September 5–6, 2018	597	± 4.0%	46%	35%	19%

=== Results ===
2018 Arizona State Treasurer election
Party	Candidate	Votes	%
Republican	Kimberly Yee	1,249,120	54.28%
Democratic	Mark Manoil	1,052,197	45.72%
Total votes		2,301,317	100.00%
Republican hold			

== See also ==
- 2018 Arizona elections
