= Government of Arizona =

Overview of the government of the U.S. state of Arizona

- Logo of the Arizonan government The Great Seal of the State of Arizona
- Part of: United States of America
- Constitution: Constitution of Arizona

Legislative branch
- Name: Legislature
- Type: Bicameral
- Meeting place: Arizona Capitol
- Upper house
- Name: Senate
- Presiding officer: Warren Petersen, President
- Presiding officer: Steve Montenegro, Speaker

Executive branch
- Head of state and government
- Title: Governor
- Currently: Katie Hobbs
- Appointer: Election
- Cabinet
- Name: Cabinet
- Leader: Governor
- Deputy leader: Lieutenant Governor
- Headquarters: State Capitol

Judicial branch
- Name: Judiciary of Arizona
- Courts: Courts of Arizona
- Supreme Court of Arizona
- Chief judge: Robert M. Brutinel
- Seat: Phoenix, Arizona

The government of Arizona consists of the executive, judiciary, and legislature of Arizona as established by the Arizona Constitution. The executive is composed of the governor, several other statewide elected officials, and the Governor's cabinet. The Arizona Legislature consists of the House of Representatives and Senate. The judiciary is composed of the Arizona Supreme Court and lower courts. There is also local government, consisting of counties, municipalities and special districts.

== Executive ==
The statewide elected officers are:

Elected Executive Officials in Arizona
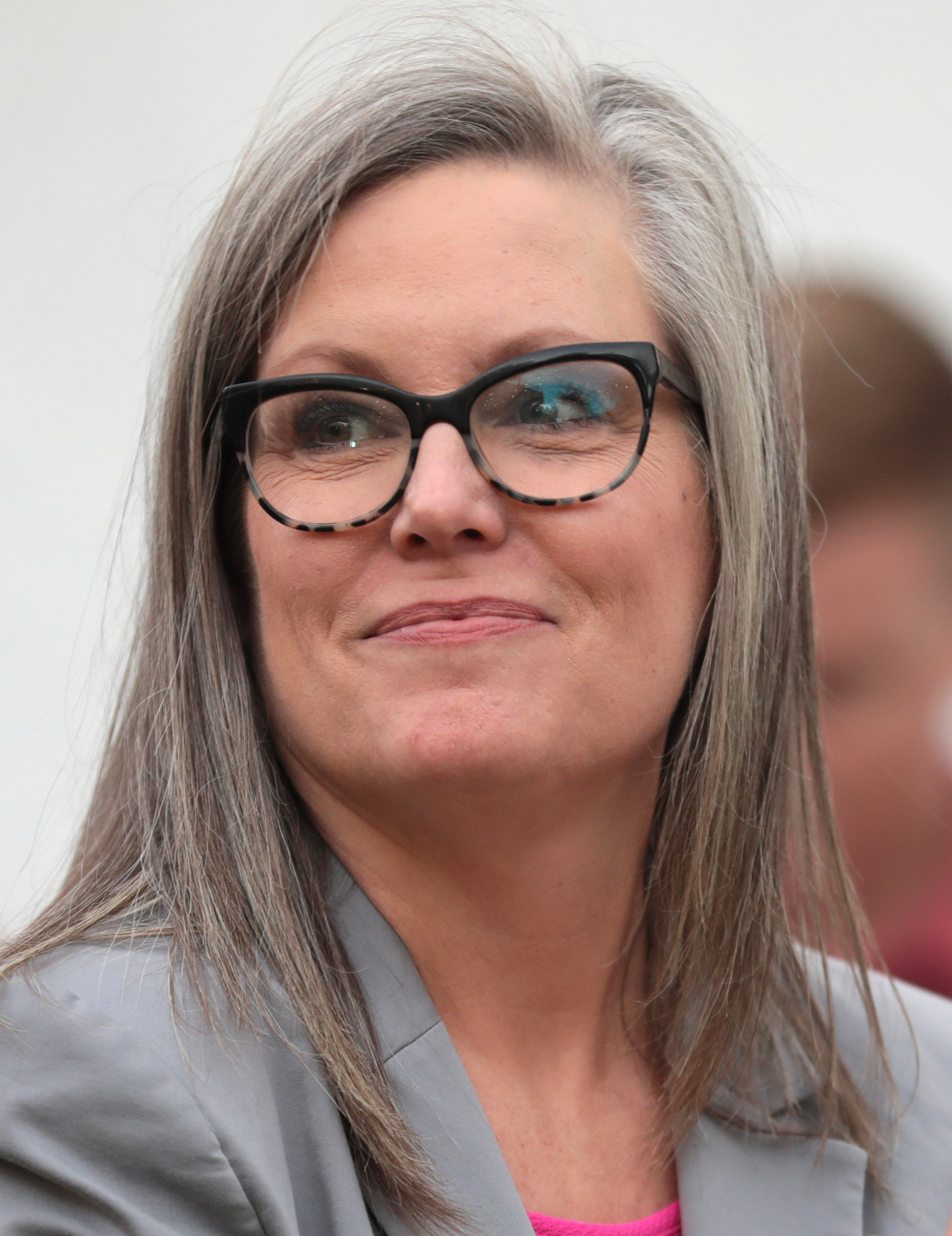
Katie Hobbs (D)
Governor

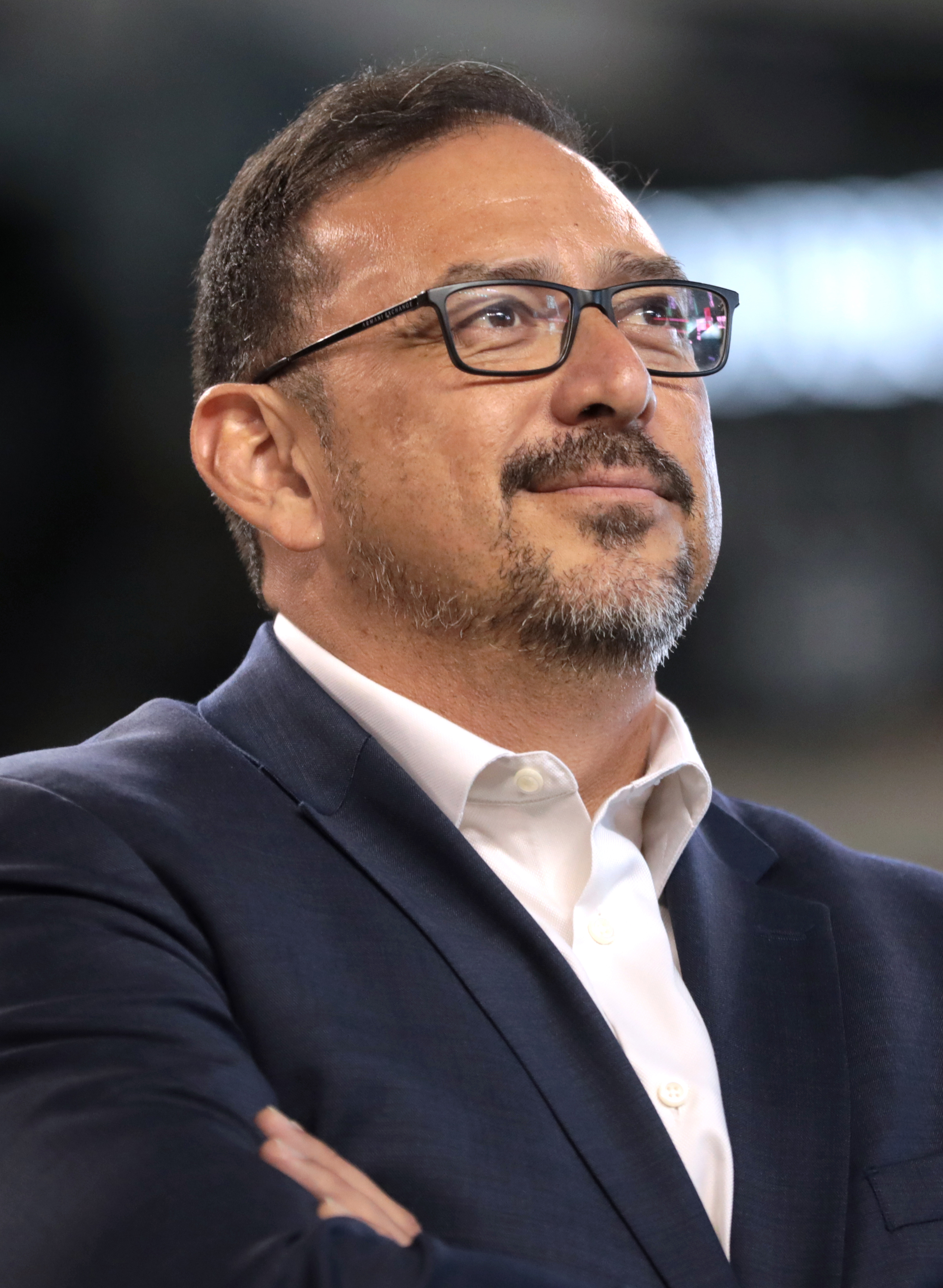
Adrian Fontes (D)
Secretary of State

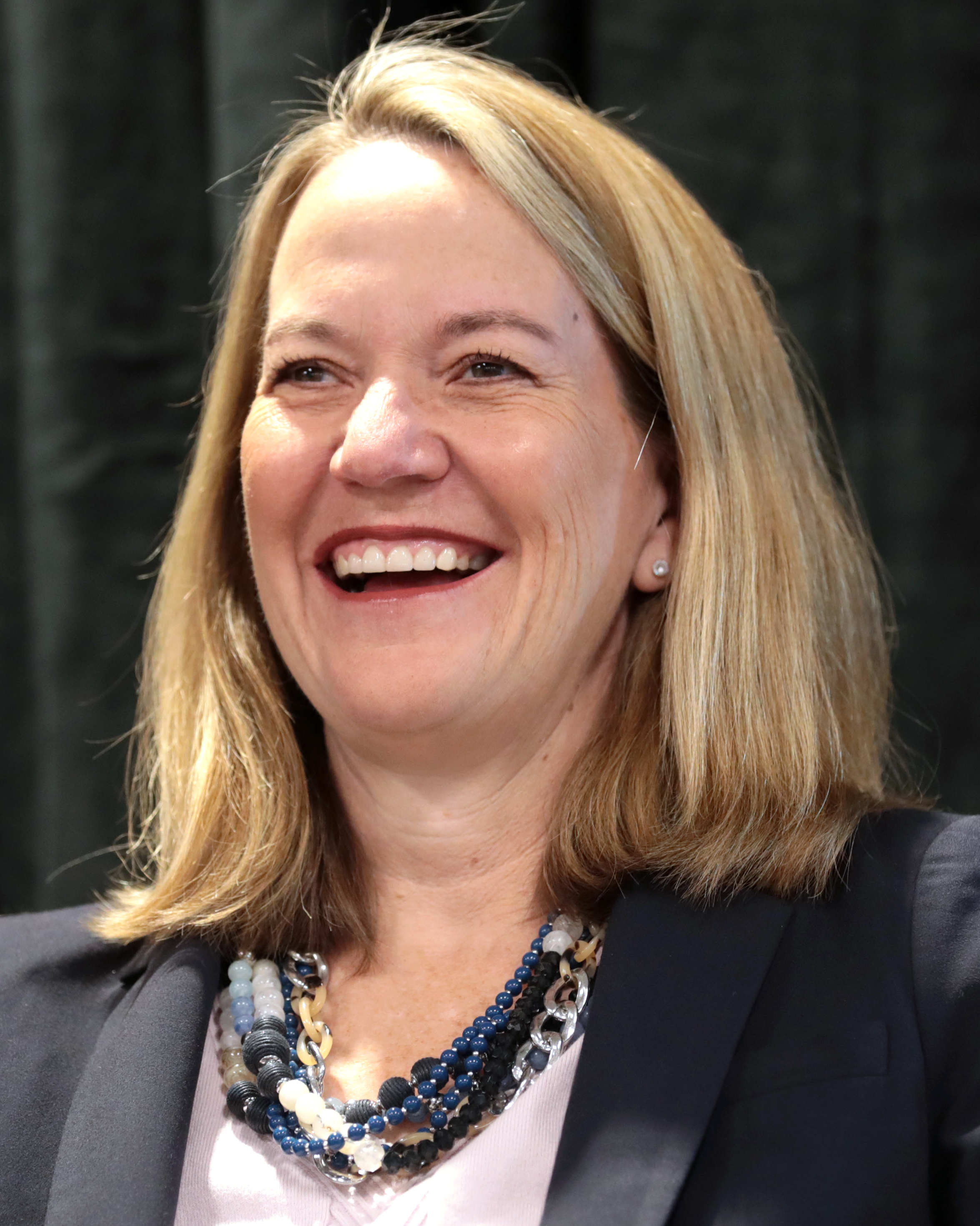
Kris Mayes (D)
Attorney General

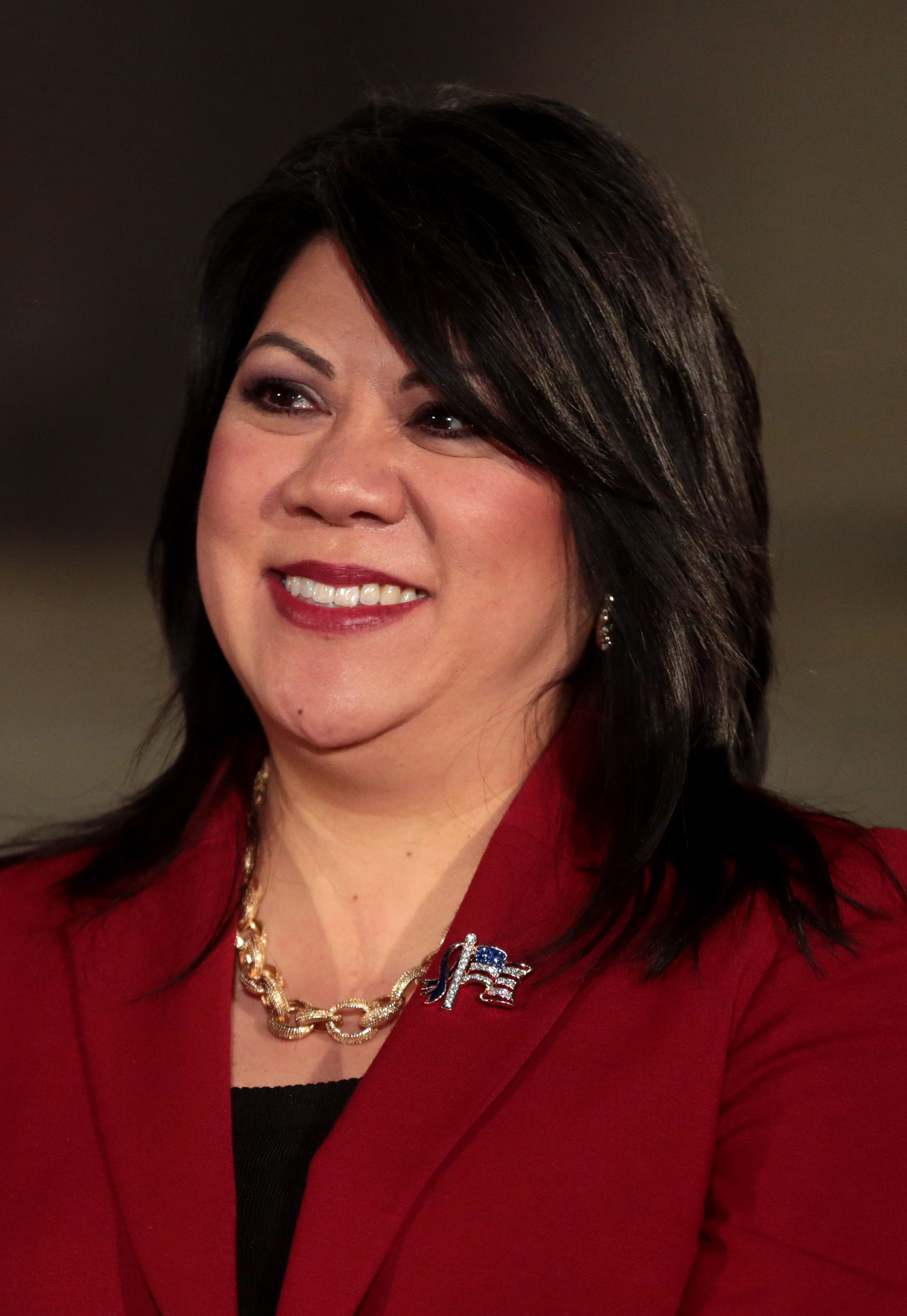
Kimberly Yee (R)
State Treasurer

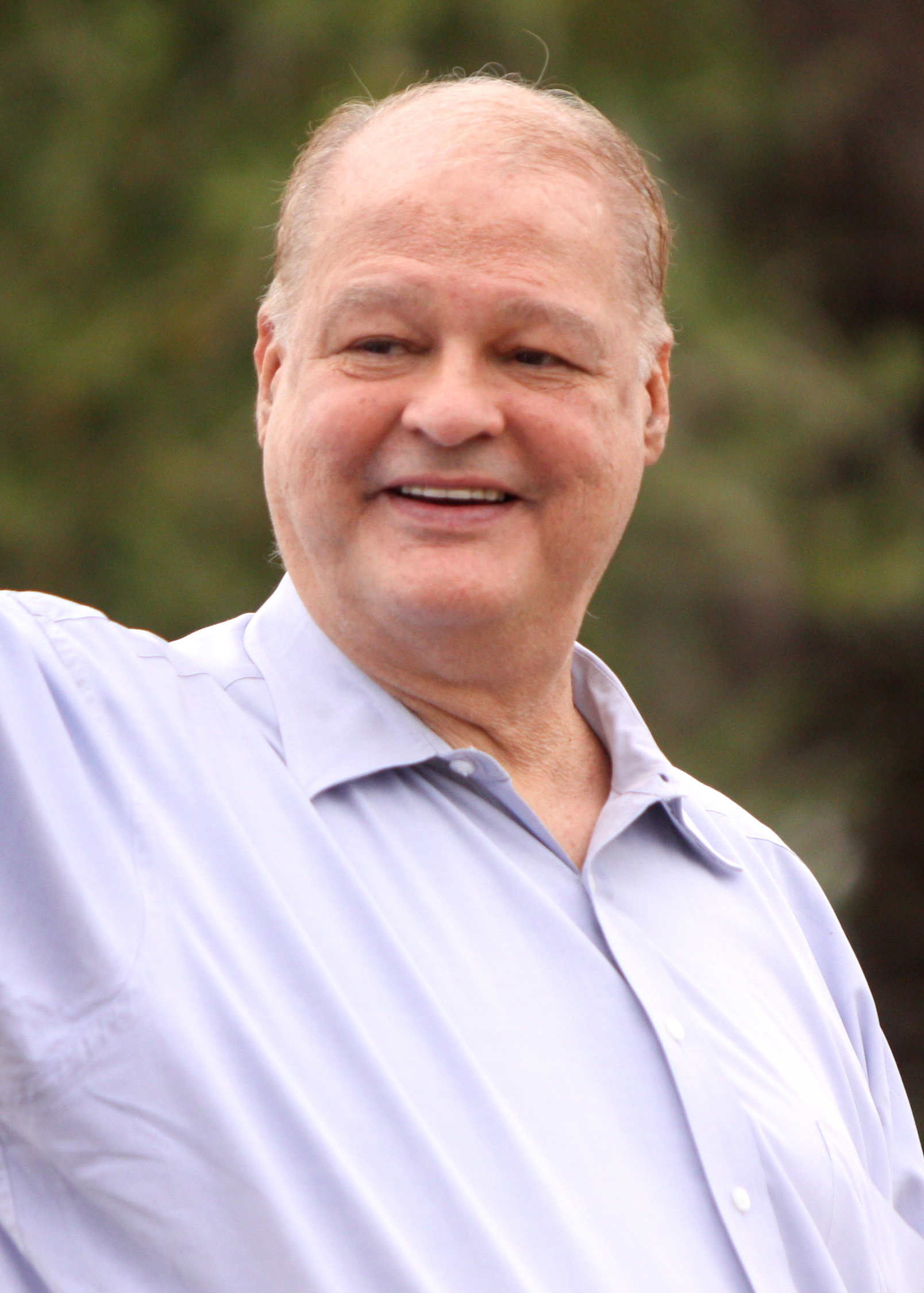
Tom Horne (R)
Superintendent of Public Instruction

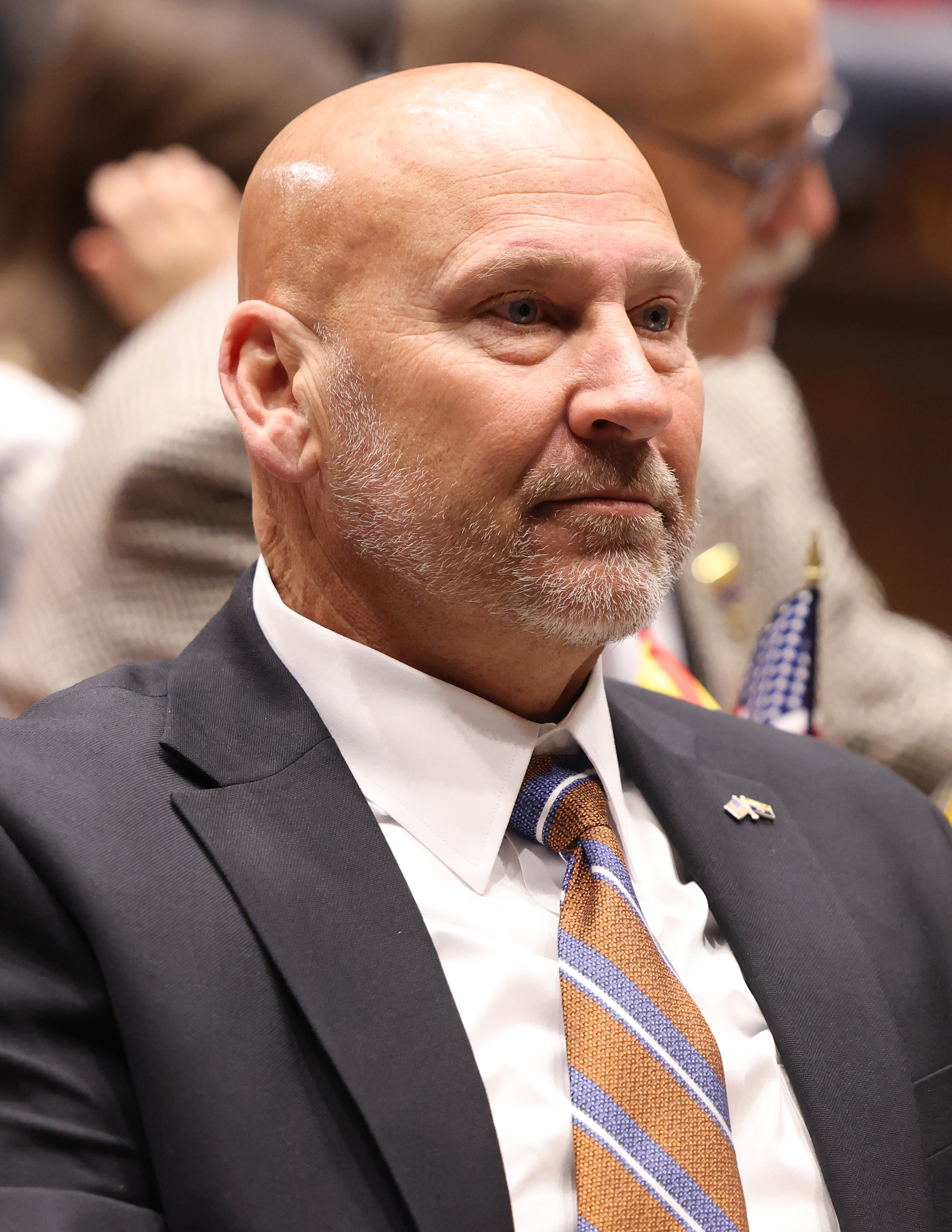
Paul Marsh (R)
State Mine Inspector
Elected Corporation Commissioners
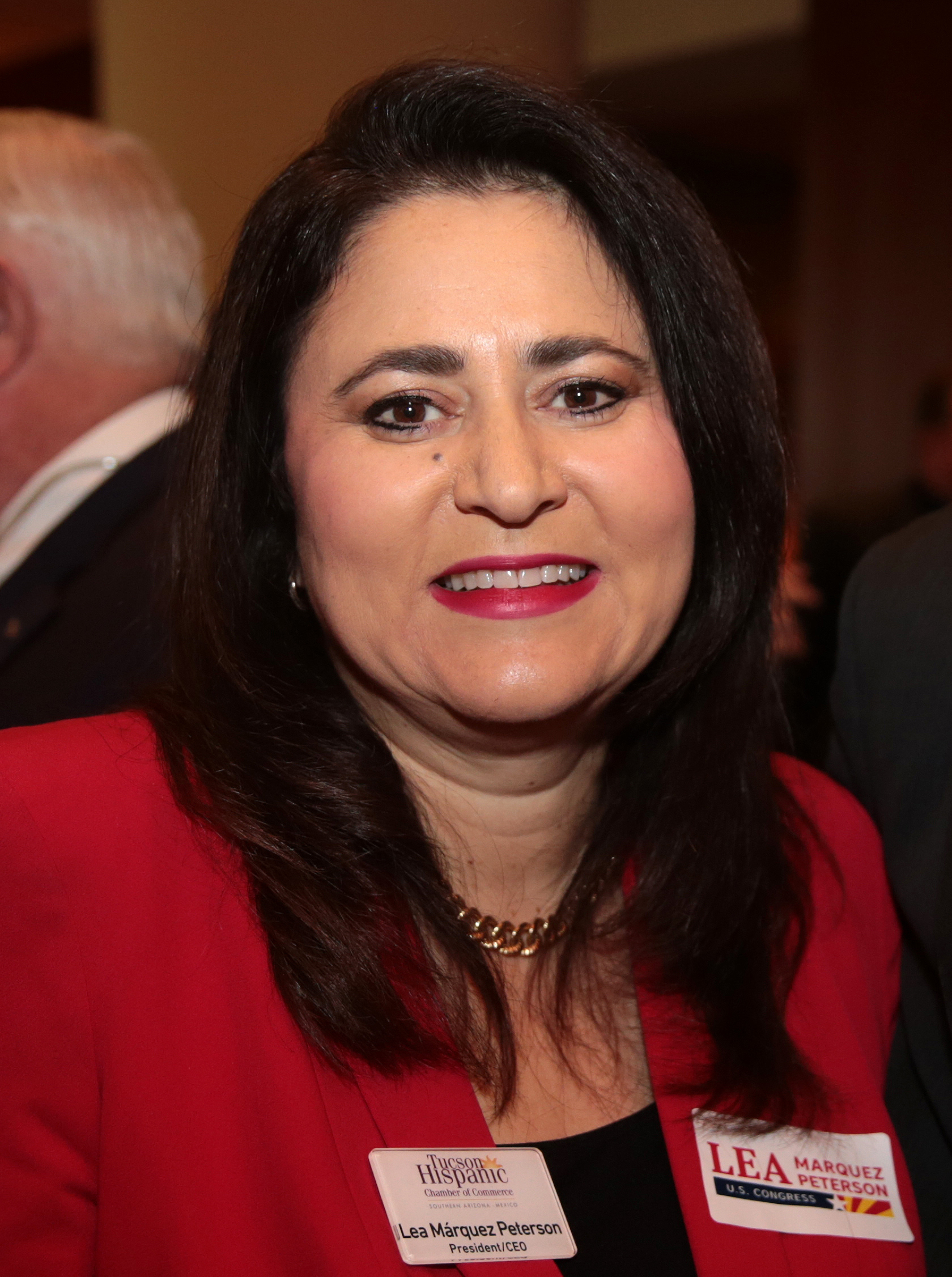
Lea Márquez Peterson (R)
Corporation Commissioner

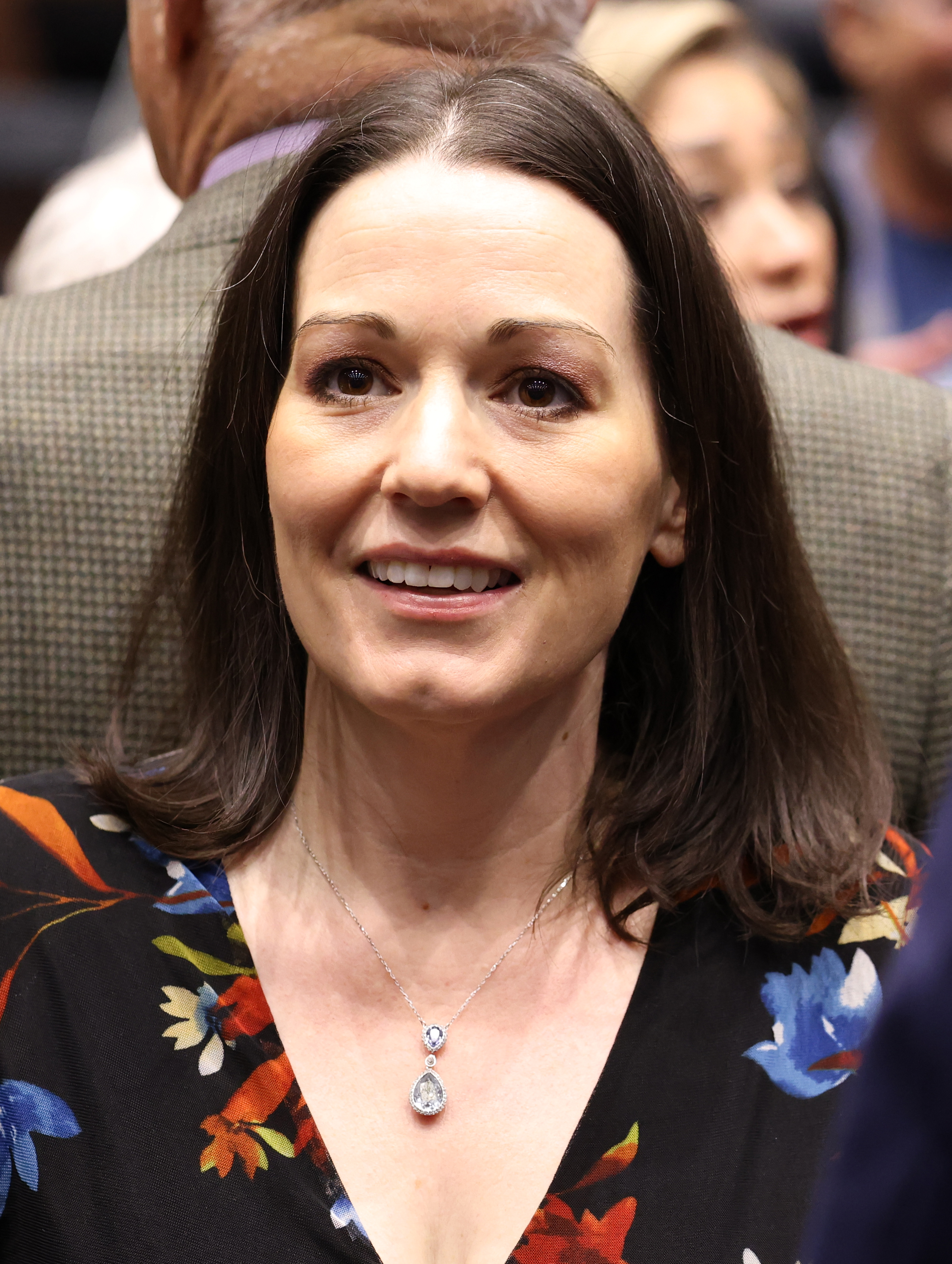
Rachel Walden (R)
Corporation Commissioner

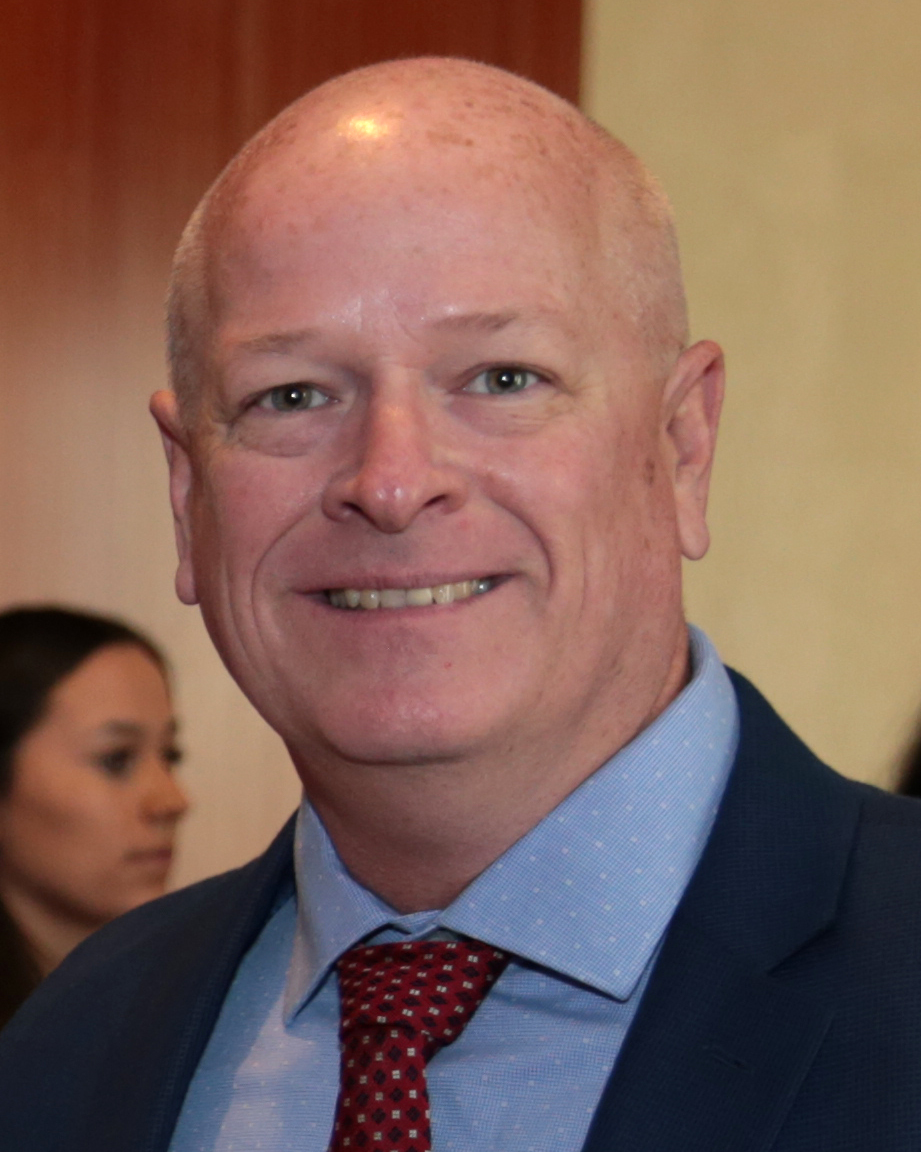
Kevin Thompson (R)
Corporation Commissioner

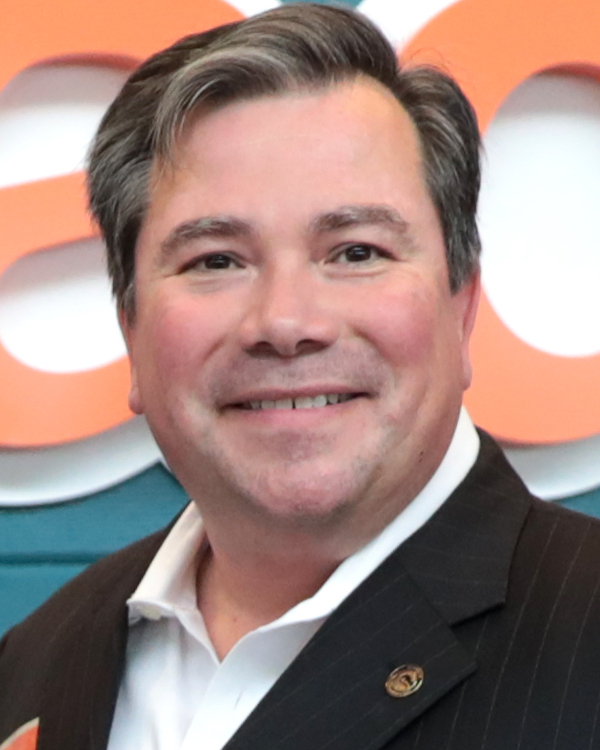
René Lopez (R)
Corporation Commissioner

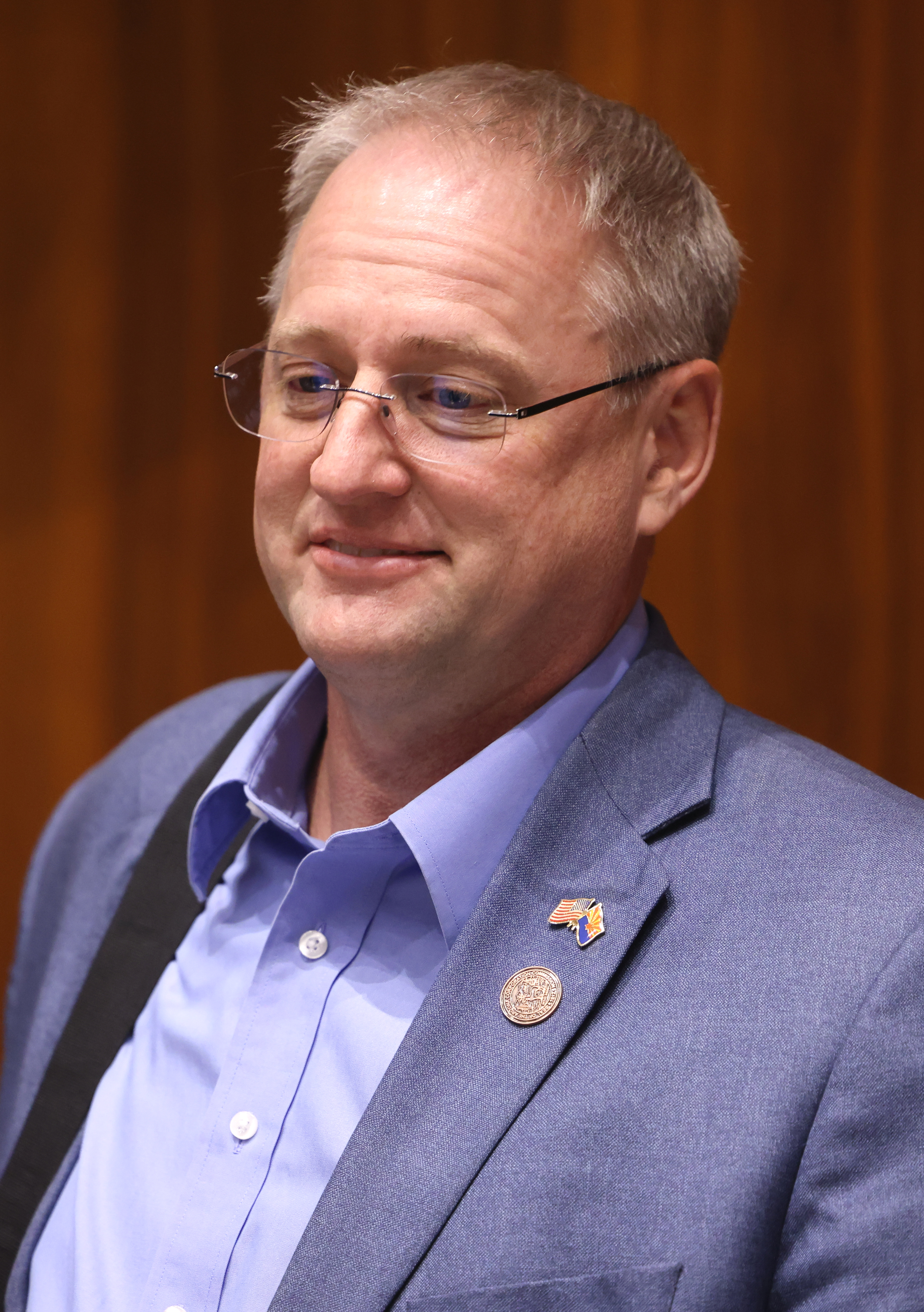
Nick Myers (R)
Corporation Commissioner

All elected officials hold a term of four years, and are limited to two consecutive terms (except the office of the state mine inspector, which is limited to four terms). Arizona is one of five states that do not have a specified lieutenant governor, so the secretary of state is the first in line to succeed the governor in the event of death, disability, resignation, or removal from office. The line of succession also includes the attorney general, state treasurer, and superintendent of public instruction. Elections for statewide officers occur during even numbered, non-presidential, years, except that 3 of the corporation commissioners are elected during presidential years.

On November 8, 2022, Arizona voters approved a state constitutional amendment (Proposition 131) that created the new position and office of the lieutenant governor beginning with the 2026 elections cycle. The position will be elected on a joint ticket with the governor. The lieutenant governor ascends to the governorship if the incumbent governor dies, resigns, or is removed (via impeachment conviction) from office. The proposition, through a law pre-passed by the state legislature, also tasks the governor with assigning a job to her or his running mate, such as chief of staff, the director of the state Department of Administration, or "any position" to which the governor can appoint someone by law.

=== Cabinet ===
The state departments and agencies are:

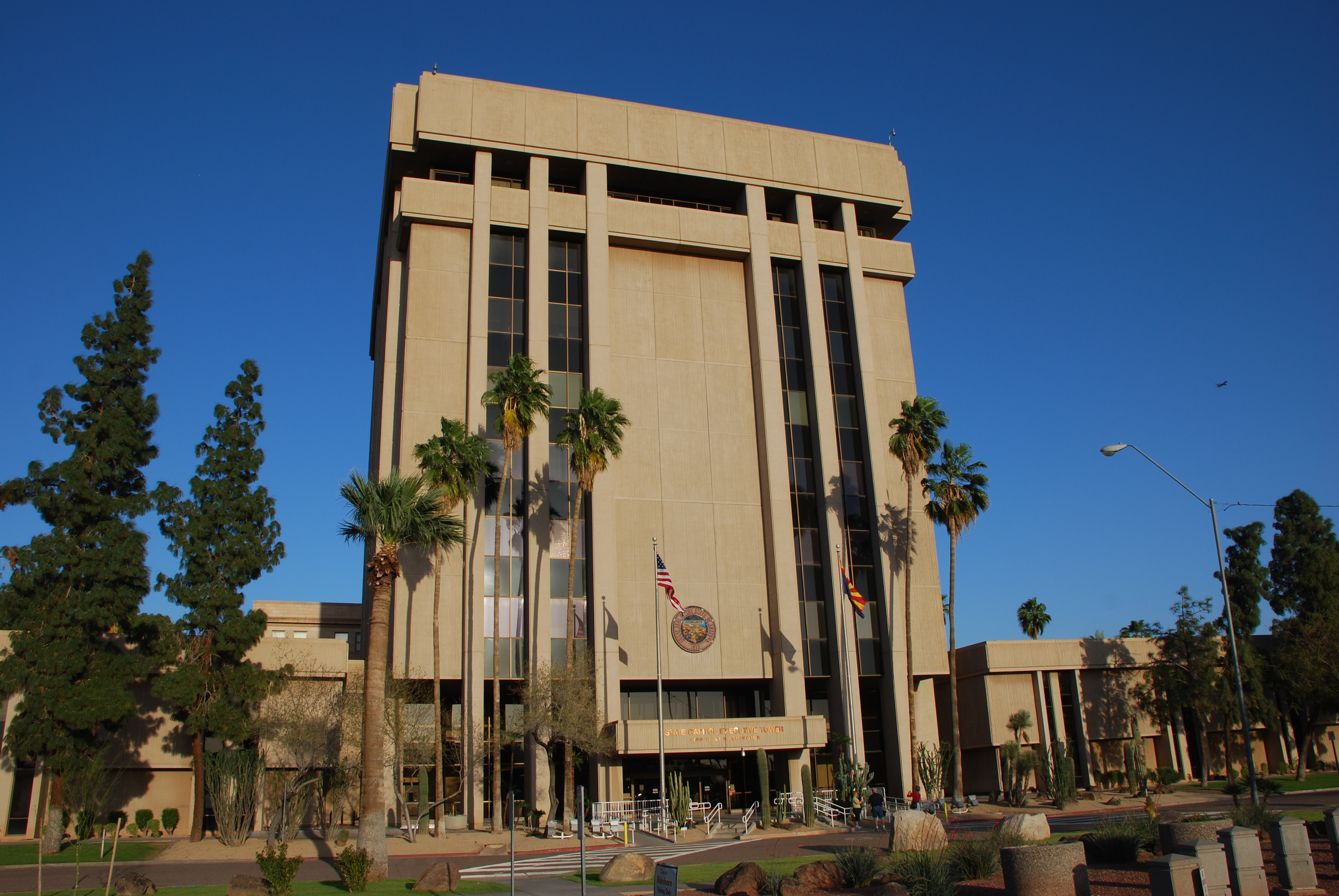
The Arizona State Capitol Executive Tower in Phoenix

- Arizona Department of Administration (ADOA)
- Arizona Department of Agriculture (AZDA)
- Arizona Department of Child Safety
- Arizona Department of Commerce
- Arizona Department of Corrections (ADC)
- Arizona Department of Economic Security (DES)
- Arizona Department of Education (ADE)
- Arizona Department of Emergency and Military Affairs (DEMA)
- Arizona Department of Environmental Quality (ADEQ)
- Arizona Department of Fire, Building and Life Safety (DFBLS)
- Arizona State Forestry Division (AZSF)
- Arizona Game and Fish Department (AZGFD)
- Arizona Department of Gaming (ADG)
- Arizona Geological Survey (AZGS)
- Arizona Department of Homeland Security (AZDOHS)
- Arizona Health Care Cost Containment System (AHCCCS)
- Arizona Department of Health Services (ADHS)
- Arizona Department of Housing
- Arizona Department of Insurance and Financial Institutions (AZDIFI)
- Arizona Department of Juvenile Corrections (ADJC)
- Arizona State Land Department
- Arizona Department of Liquor Licenses and Control (DLLC)
- Arizona State Schools for the Deaf and Blind
- Arizona Department of Public Safety (DPS)
- Arizona Department of Real Estate (ADRE)
- Arizona Registrar of Contractors (ROC)
- Arizona Residential Utility Consumer Office (RUCO)
- Arizona Department of Revenue (ADOR)
- Arizona School Facilities Board (SFB)
- Arizona Office of Tourism (AOT)
- Arizona Department of Transportation (ADOT)
- Arizona Department of Veterans' Services (DVS)
- Arizona Department of Water Resources (ADWR)
- Arizona Department of Weights and Measures (AZDWM). Eliminated in 2015.

Arizona Boards and Commissions Include

- Arizona Board of Regents
- Arizona Commission for the Deaf and Hard of Hearing
- Arizona Commission of Indian Affairs
- Arizona Historical Society
- Arizona Independent Redistricting Commission
- Arizona Judicial Conduct Commission
- Arizona Power Authority Commission
- Arizona State Boxing Commission
- Arizona State Lottery Commission
- Arizona State Board of Dispensing Opticians
- Arizona State Parks Board

== Legislature ==
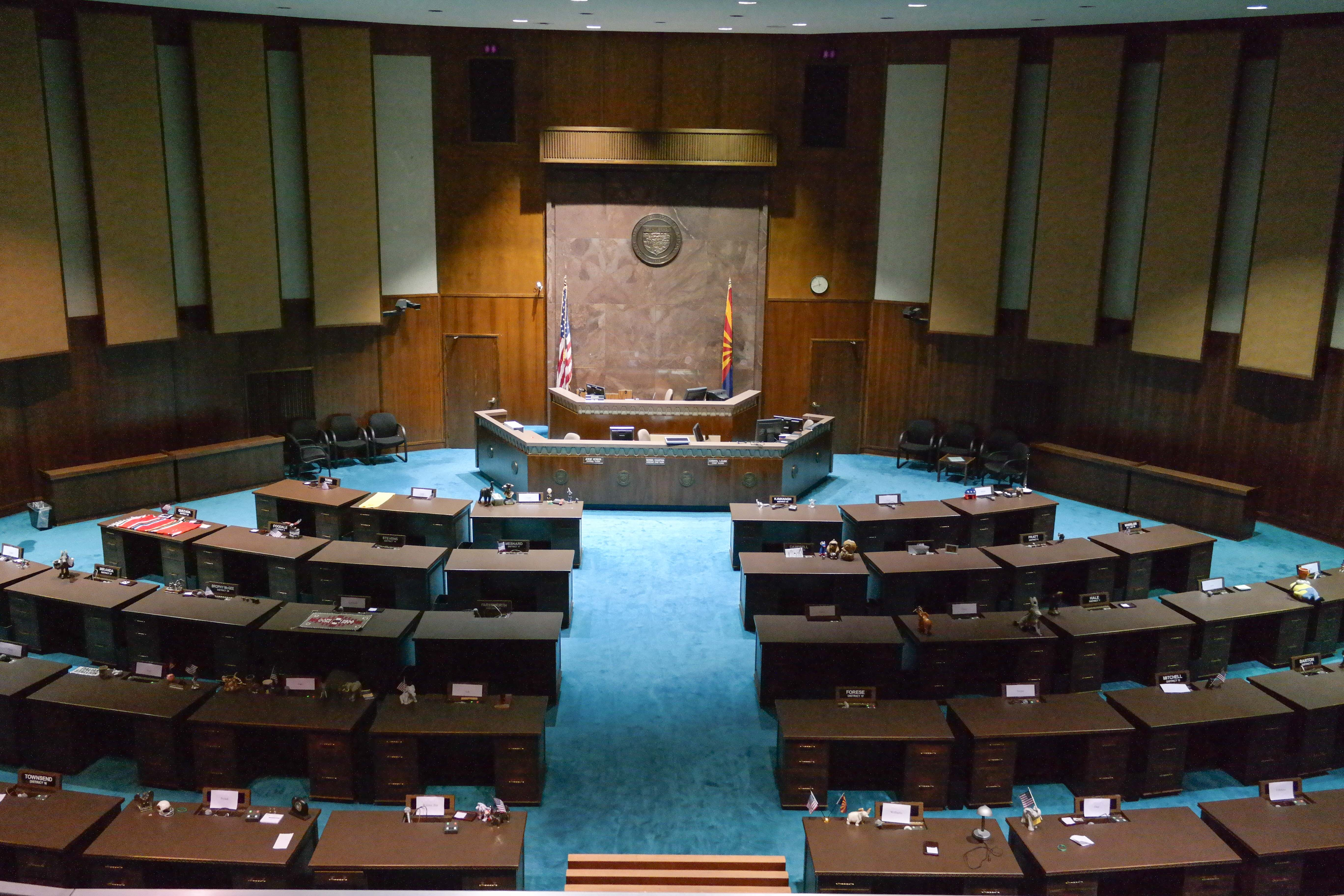
The State House Chamber of the Arizona State Capitol Building

The Arizona State Legislature is bicameral and consists of the 60-member Arizona House of Representatives and the 30-member Arizona Senate. Each of the thirty legislative districts has one senator and two representatives. Legislators are elected for two-year terms and are limited to four consecutive terms in a chamber, though there is no limit on the total number of terms.

Each Legislature covers a two-year period. The first session following the general election is known as the first regular session, and the session convening in the second year is known as the second regular session. Each regular session begins on the second Monday in January and adjourns sine die (terminates for the year) no later than Saturday of the week in which the 100th day from the beginning of the regular session falls. The President of the Senate and Speaker of the House, by rule, may extend the session up to seven additional days. Thereafter, the session can only be extended by a majority vote of members present of each house.

== Judiciary ==
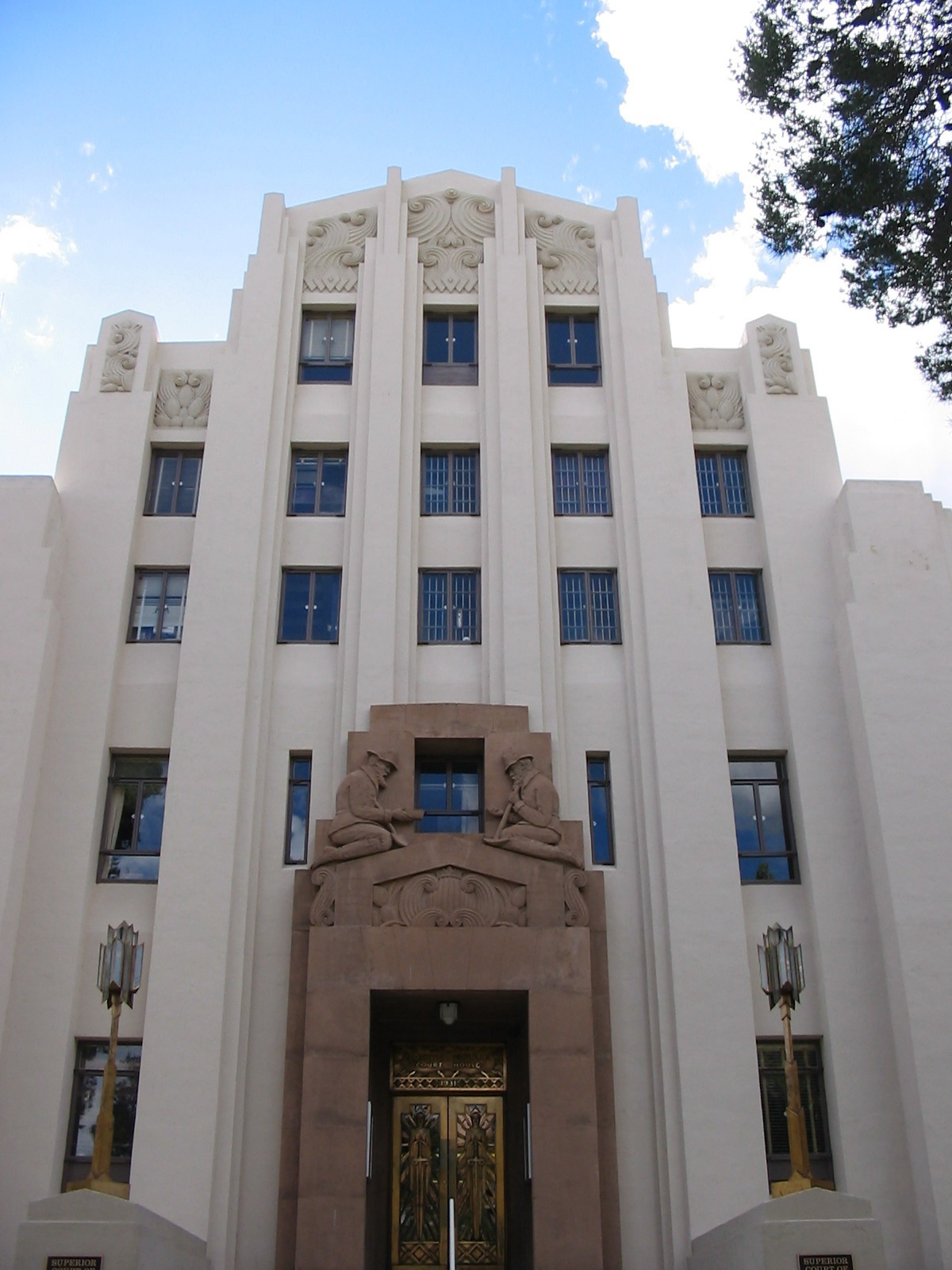
The Cochise County courthouse in Bisbee

The Arizona Supreme Court is the highest court in Arizona. The court currently consists of one chief justice, a vice chief justice, and five associate justices. The supreme court has appellate jurisdiction in death penalty cases, but almost all other appellate cases go through the Arizona Court of Appeals beforehand. The court has original jurisdiction in a few other circumstances, as outlined in the state constitution. The court may also declare laws unconstitutional, but only while seated en banc. The court meets in the Arizona Supreme Court Building at the capitol complex (at the southern end of Wesley Bolin Plaza).

The Arizona Court of Appeals, further divided into two divisions, is the intermediate court in the state. It hears and decides cases in three judge panels. Division One is based in Phoenix, consists of sixteen judges, and has jurisdiction in the Western and Northern regions of the state, along with the greater Phoenix area. Division Two is based in Tucson, consists of six judges, and has jurisdiction over the Southern regions of the state, including the Tucson area.

The Arizona Superior Court is the court of general jurisdiction. The Superior Court also acts as an appellate court for justice and municipal courts.

The Arizona justice courts are nonrecord courts of limited jurisdiction in each county, presided over by a justice of the peace who is elected for a four-year term, that have jurisdiction over civil lawsuits where the amount in dispute is $10,000 or less, landlord and tenant controversies, small claims cases and the full range of civil and criminal traffic offenses, including DUIs, and other types of misdemeanor allegations (e.g. shoplifting, writing bad checks, violating restraining orders).

The Arizona municipal courts, also known as city courts or magistrate courts, are nonrecord courts of limited jurisdiction that have criminal jurisdiction over misdemeanor crimes and petty offenses committed in their city or town and share jurisdiction with justice courts over violations of state law committed within their city or town limits, and hear misdemeanor criminal traffic cases such as driving under the influence of alcohol, hit-and-run and reckless driving where no serious injuries occur, and hear civil traffic cases, violations of city ordinances and codes, and issue orders of protection and injunctions prohibiting harassment, and can also issue search warrants.

=== Merit Selection ===
All justices of the Arizona Supreme Court and all judges of the Arizona Court of Appeals as well as the trial court judges in some counties are selected through a process known as merit selection, a version of the Missouri Plan. The process, approved by voters in 1974 and amended in 1992, is described in Article 6, Section 37 of the Arizona Constitution. As described there in paragraph B, the selection of trial court judges through this process only applies to counties with a population of over 250,000 people, as counted by the most recent US Census. As of 2023, this only applies to Maricopa County, Pima County, and Pinal County. An exception is made in Section 40 for less populous counties that vote to opt in to the process. As of 2023, only Coconino County has done so, back in 2018.

In merit selection, justices and judges are appointed by the governor from a list recommended by a bipartisan commission, and are re-elected (through what is called retention election) after the initial two years following their appointment. Subsequent re-elections occur every six years for the supreme and appellate courts, every four years for superior courts.

== Local government ==
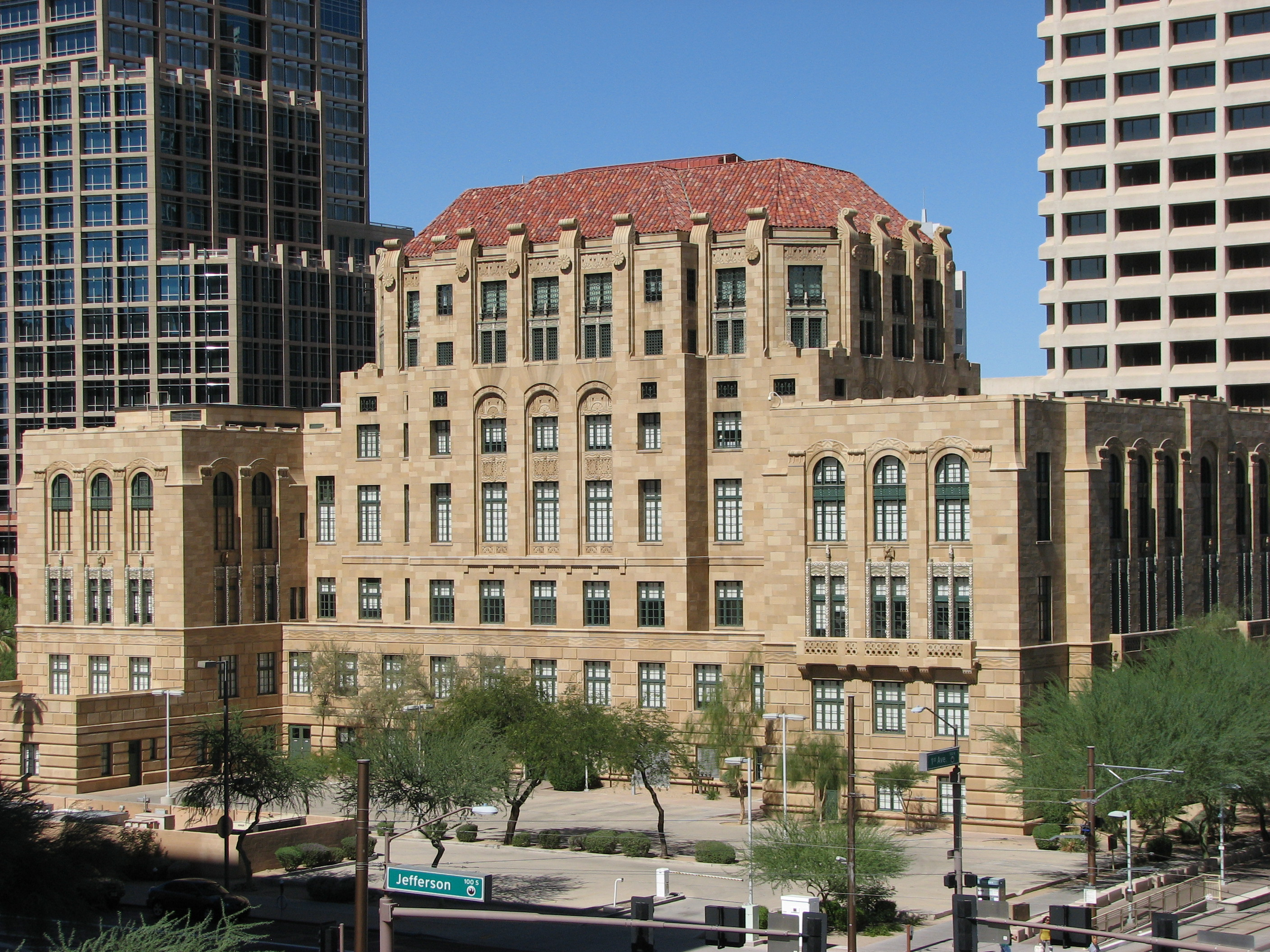
The (Maricopa) County-City Administration Building in Phoenix

Arizona is divided into political jurisdictions designated as counties, which derive all of their power from the state. Incorporated cities and towns are those that have been granted home rule, possessing a local government in the form of a city or town council.

== See also ==
- Politics of Arizona
- Political party strength in Arizona
- Arizona Independent Redistricting Commission
