= Nick Mansour =

American politician

Treasurer-Elect of Arizona
- Assuming office January 2027
- Governor: Katie Hobbs
- Succeeding: Kimberly Yee

Personal details
- Party: Democratic
- Spouse: Annemarie
- Children: 4
- Education: Stanford University (MBA)

Nick Mansour is an American politician from Arizona. He is the state treasurer-elect of Arizona.

== Early life and career ==
Mansour graduated from Salpointe Catholic High School in Tucson, Arizona, and earned a bachelor's degree and Master of Business Administration from Stanford University. During his career, Mansour worked at the Stanford Graduate School of Business, Sam Coppersmith's 1994 U.S. Senate race, and Boston Consulting Group. He then served as vice president of business development for Pacific Pulmonary Services, co-founder and Chief Operating Officer of Continental Fire & Safety Services, and founder and partner of Presidio Partners, Inc and Clear Creek Environmental, LLC. Mansour most recently as chairman and CEO of the Arizona College of Nursing.

Mansour serves on the board of the Arizona College of Nursing, Woven Care, Re Vive, Spanish Schoolhouse, Newbury Franklin Pet Services, and The Banner Health Foundation. He became involved with Seeds of Peace in the early 1990s and currently serves on the organization's board of directors.

== State Treasurer of Arizona ==
In June 2026, Mansour announced his candidacy for State Treasurer of Arizona in the 2026 election. He defeated Republican nominee Elijah Norton in the November general election.
