= Senator Yee =

Senator Yee may refer to:

- Kimberly Yee (born 1974), Arizona State Senate
- Leland Yee (born 1948), California State Senate
