= Hugh Hallman =

American politician

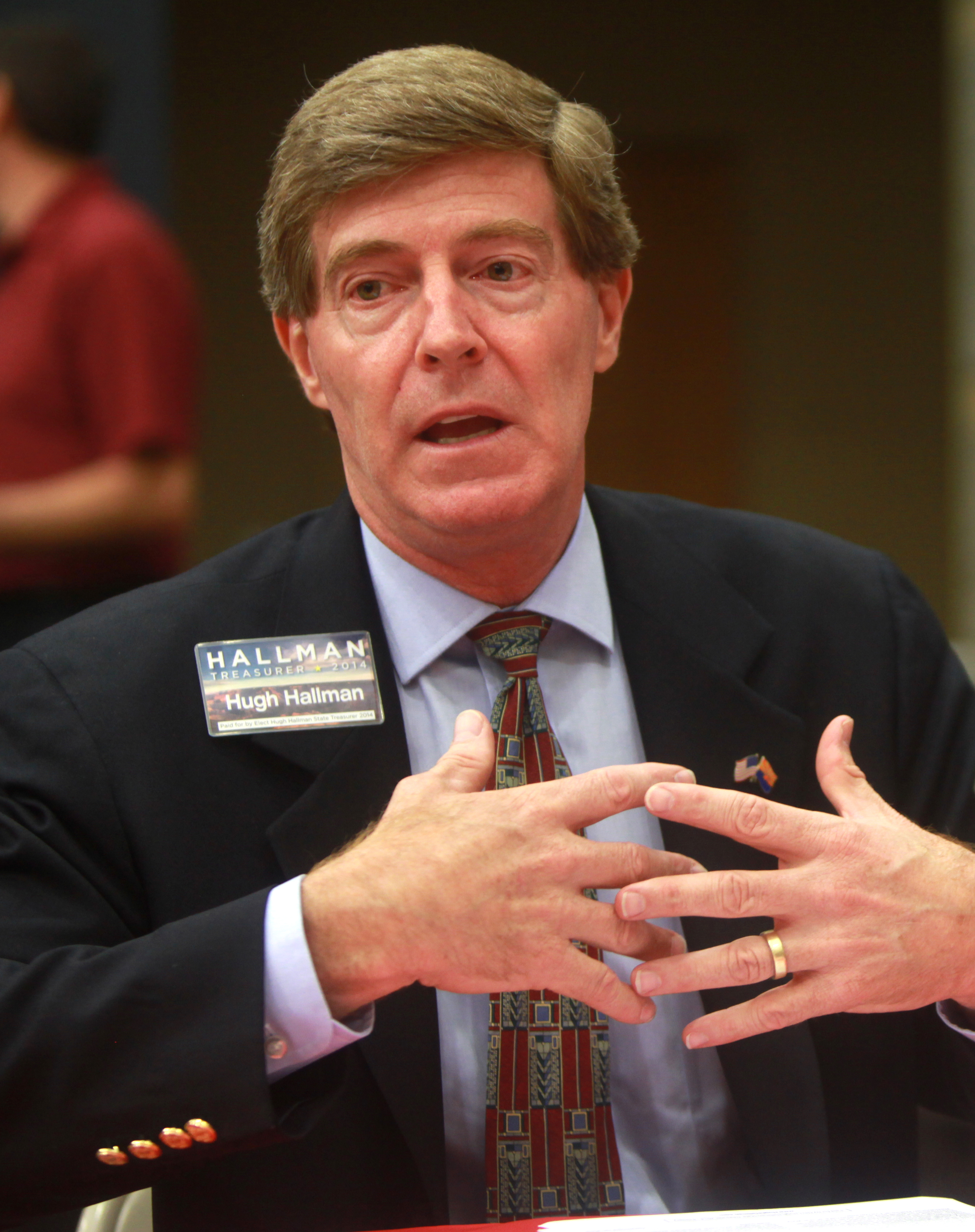

Mayor of Tempe
- In office 2004–2012
- Preceded by: Neil Giuliano
- Succeeded by: Mark Mitchell

Personal details
- Born: January 13, 1962 (age 64) Tempe, Arizona, U.S.
- Party: Republican
- Spouse: Susan Hallman
- Education: Arizona State University; Claremont McKenna College; University of Chicago

Hugh Hallman is an American politician who served as the mayor of Tempe, Arizona for two consecutive terms, from 2004 to 2012, and as councilman from 1998 to 2002. Hallman was a candidate for State Treasurer of Arizona in the Republican primary on August 26, 2014, but lost to Jeff DeWit.

Hallman is a community activist, volunteer, and lifelong resident of Tempe. His background as a public servant, teacher, economist, and attorney has allowed him to design public programs and policies locally, nationally, and internationally.

== Early life and education ==
Hallman is the son of Evelyn Hallman (née Evelyn Rose Chapman), a seamstress, diesel mechanic, and longtime Tempe community activist; and Louis, a retired high school math teacher and football, basketball and wrestling coach, among other sports. His mother, whose early political activities included volunteering for the presidential campaign of Barry Goldwater, was honored in 2006 for her local preservation efforts in North Tempe when Canal Park was renamed Evelyn Hallman Park. Hugh graduated from Coronado High School (Scottsdale, Arizona) and was admitted to Claremont Men's College in California, but studied at Arizona State University in the Honors Program (now the Barrett Honors College) for his first year. He then transferred to Claremont, where he majored in economics and political science and minored in accounting. He eventually became president of the student government and graduated summa cum laude in 1984. Hallman earned his J.D. from the University of Chicago Law School in 1988, where he graduated with Honors and Order of the Coif.

== Professional career ==
Hallman began his legal career as an associate at the law firm of Brown and Bain, where he worked in the fields of domestic and international finance and taxation, intellectual property and anti-trust. Later he became a partner in the firm Colombo & Bonacci until he established his own firm, Hallman and Affiliates, in 1999 where he has dealt with a broad range of legal issues for individual and corporate clients. As an economist, Hallman has worked with colleagues at Stanford, Harvard, MIT, and the University of Chicago in analyzing markets and competition in various industries.

=== Educator ===
In addition to being a past lecturer at Arizona State University and East-Kazakhstan State University, Hallman is a visiting professor and founder of the Kazakh-American Free University (KAFU) in Ust-Kamenogorsk, Kazakhstan. Following the collapse of the Soviet Union, Hallman was invited to tour the former Soviet republics. His subsequent partnership with the former Minister of Education of the Republic of Kazakhstan, Dr. Erezhep Mambetkaziyev, led to the creation of KAFU, which today serves thousands of students in the fields of business, law, and education. In 2009 Hallman put his law practice on hiatus to become headmaster of Tempe Preparatory Academy, an independent public charter school where he had served as general counsel. Hallman's three sons have attended the school.

== Political career ==
Hugh's political career began at age 2 when he accompanied his mother to events for Barry Goldwater presidential campaign in 1964. Prior to graduating from Claremont, Hallman took a position in Ronald Reagan's campaign as a deputy assistant to the national campaign director. He took a deferral from the University of Chicago, where he had been accepted, to complete his service to the Reagan-Bush '84 campaign. He then took time off from politics to enter law school, but returned to the political arena a few years later when his experience helping local activists preserve Tempe Beach Park led to his successful run for a seat on the Tempe City Council. Hallman ran for mayor of Tempe in 2004 but was considered an outsider even by his Republican colleagues. His success in the hotly contested campaign marked a change in Tempe politics, and during his first term he positioned himself as a "reformer". His primary goals were to attract new development for the city and establish sound fiscal policies while strengthening essential city services such as police and fire. As a pro-business and pro-development mayor who frequently crossed the aisle to achieve his goals, the Arizona Republic referred to him as "one of those rare public officials who meticulously connects the dots". Hallman won re-election in 2008 without formal opposition. During his second term he also served as Chairman of the Maricopa Association of Governments, and has been an ardent champion of cooperative development and improved international trade with Mexico given his long experience in the field.

== Additional community activities ==
Hallman has been involved with numerous local charities such as East Valley Habitat for Humanity, Assistance for Independent Living, Tempe Community Action Agency, and the Boy Scouts of America. He was the president of the Rio Salado Foundation and spearheaded efforts to preserve Justice Sandra Day O'Connor's former Phoenix residence, which was moved to the Arizona Historical Society grounds and now serves as a center for national and international problem solving and policy initiatives.

== Writings by Hugh Hallman ==
In addition to numerous editorials and essays, Hallman has written four business texts. They are How to Do Business in Kazakhstan, published in 1999 with a second edition published in 2004; its companion text, How to Do Business in the United States, which is a Russian language text; and How to Do Business in Sonora and its companion Spanish language text Como Hacer Negocios En Arizona, the latter two of which he co-authored in support of Arizona's effort to build successful cross-border trade with Mexico and create jobs for Arizonans.

== Awards and recognition ==
Hallman is the recipient of numerous awards and honors, including Arizona Charter School Association "Leader of the Year"; Alzheimer's Association Leadership Award; League of United Latin American Citizens Citizenship Award; JAG National "Above & Beyond the Call" Service Award; and the East Valley Partnership "Lifetime Achievement Award."

== Personal ==
Hallman's wife, Susan, whom he met at the University of Chicago, is a physician specializing in internal medicine. Together they have three sons. An avid runner, Hallman primarily competes in half marathons. Hallman organized the annual Mayor's Run, which has raised over $1.3 million for local charities.
