= Teresa Ruiz =

Teresa Ruiz may refer to:

- Terele Pávez (1939–2017), born Teresa Parta Ruiz Penella, Spanish actress
- Teresa Ruiz (actress) (born 1988), Mexican actress
- Teresa Ruiz (Arizona politician), Arizona Superintendent of Public instruction-elect
- Teresa Ruiz (politician) (born 1974), member of the New Jersey Senate
