= 2026 Arizona Superintendent of Public Instruction election =

- November 3, 2026

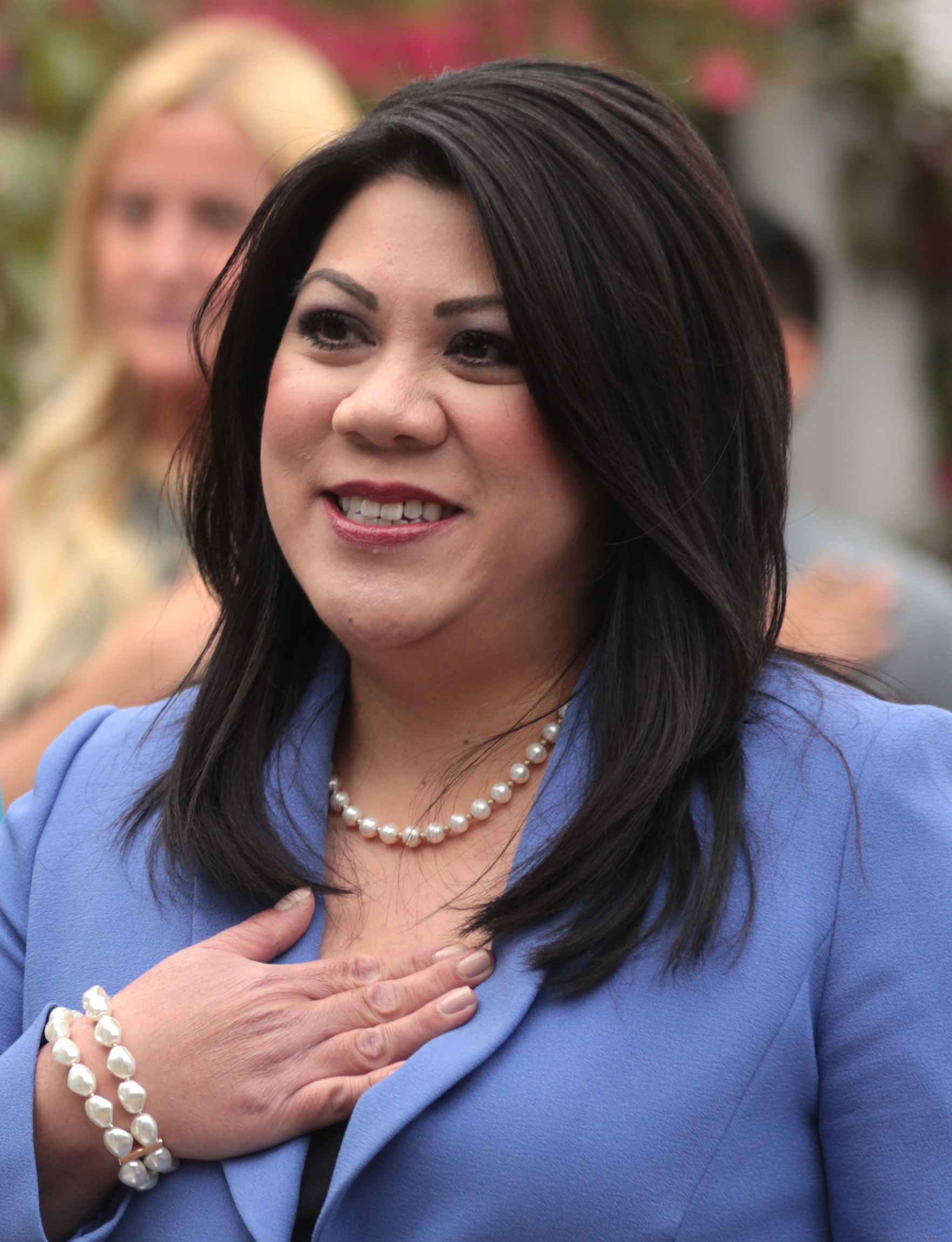
Nominee	Teresa Leyba Ruiz	Kimberly Yee
Party	Democratic	Republican
Popular vote	1,261,296	1,118,296
Percentage	53.0%	46.9%
- Ruiz: 50–60% 60–70% 70–80% Yee: 50–60% 60–70% 70–80%
Superintendent before election
Tom Horne
Republican
Elected Superintendent
Teresa Leyba Ruiz
Democratic

The 2026 Arizona Superintendent of Public Instruction election took place on November 3, 2026, to elect the Superintendent of Public Instruction of Arizona. Incumbent Republican Superintendent Tom Horne faced a challenge, and lost, in the Republican primary to state treasurer Kimberly Yee, who faced Democratic challenger Teresa Ruiz in the general. Ruiz was declared the winner, becoming only the second Democrat to win the seat since 1990.

== Republican primary ==
=== Candidates ===
==== Nominee ====
- Kimberly Yee, state treasurer (2019–present) and candidate for governor in 2022

==== Eliminated in primary ====
- Tom Horne, incumbent superintendent

=== Endorsements ===
Kimberly Yee

State legislators

- Jake Hoffman, state senator from LD-15 (2023–present)

Organizations

- Maggie's List
- Turning Point Action

=== Polling ===
Poll source	Date(s) administered	Sample size (Note: Key: A – all adults RV – registered voters LV – likely voters V – unclear)	Margin of error	Tom Horne	Kimberly Yee	Undecided
NextGen Polling	July 8–9, 2026	1,707 (LV)	± 2.5%	36%	44%	20%
NextGen Polling	June 16–17, 2026	1,683 (RV)	± 2.5%	33%	24%	42%

=== Results ===
Primary results by county: Yee: 50–60%; Horne: 50–60%

Results by precinct Yee: 50–60%; 60–70%; 70–80%; 80–90%; 90–100%; Horne: 50–60%; 60–70%; 70–80%; 80–90%; 90–100%; Tie: 50%; No votes

Republican primary results
Party	Candidate	Votes	%
Republican	Kimberly Yee	322,387	53.2
Republican	Tom Horne (incumbent)	283,333	46.8
Total votes		605,720	100.0

== Democratic primary ==
=== Candidates ===
==== Nominee ====
- Teresa Ruiz, former president of Glendale Community College

==== Eliminated in primary ====
- Brett Newby, educator and Board Certified Behavior Analyst

==== Withdrawn ====
- Michael Butts, Roosevelt school board member

==== Endorsements ====
Teresa Ruiz

U.S. representatives

- Adelita Grijalva, AZ-07 (2025–present)

Statewide officials

- Kathy Hoffman, former Arizona Superintendent of Public Instruction (2019–2023)

=== Results ===
Primary results by county: Ruiz: 60–70%; 70–80%; 80–90%

Democratic primary results
Party	Candidate	Votes	%
Democratic	Teresa Ruiz	390,671	79.5
Democratic	Brett Newby	100,806	20.5
Total votes		491,477	100.0

== No Labels primary ==
=== Candidates ===
==== Did not qualify ====
- Stephen Neal Jr.

== General election ==
=== Polling ===
Poll source	Date(s) administered	Sample size	Margin of error	Kimberly Yee (R)	Teresa Ruiz (D)	Other	Undecided
Noble Predictive Insights	October 26–28, 2026	511 (LV)	± 4.3%	48%	46%	1% (Note: "Another candidate not listed" with 1%)	5%
HighGround, Inc.	October 21–25, 2026	400 (LV)	± 4.9%	43%	47%	1% (Note: "Some other candidate" with 1%)	9%
HighGround, Inc.	October 6–8, 2026	400 (LV)	± 4.9%	38%	45%	1%	16%
Arizona State University	August 18 – September 4, 2026	1,300 (RV)	± 2.7%	35%	34%	5% (Note: Gerard Davis (G) with 5%)	26%
HighGround, Inc.	August 15–18, 2026	400 (LV)	± 4.9%	41%	42%	1% (Note: "Some other candidate" with 1%)	16%
Grayhouse (R)	August 11–13, 2026	600 (LV)	± 4.0%	45%	42%	–	13%
Stealth Analytics	August 11–13, 2026	530 (LV)	± 4.3%	42%	38%	–	20%
Noble Predictive Insights	August 10–13, 2026	923 (LV)	± 3.2%	40%	37%	3% (Note: "Another candidate not listed" with 3%)	20%

=== Results ===
2026 Arizona Superintendent of Public Instruction election
Party	Candidate	Votes	%	±%
Republican	Kimberly Yee			
Democratic	Teresa Ruiz			
Write-in				
Total votes			100.0%	
