= Teresa Leyba Ruiz =

American educator and politician

24th Arizona Superintendent of Public Instruction
- Elect
- Assuming office TBD
- Governor: Katie Hobbs
- Succeeding: Tom Horne

Personal details
- Party: Democratic

Teresa Leyba Ruiz is an American educator and politician. A member of the Democratic Party, she is the Arizona superintendent of public instruction-elect having been elected in 2026.

== Background ==
Leyba Ruiz is a third-generation Arizonan and was raised in South Phoenix. She graduated from Arizona State University and Northern Arizona University as a first-generation college student. She was a member of the mathematics faculty at South Mountain Community College and served as 8th president of Glendale Community College. During the Biden Administration, Leyba Ruiz was named to the White House Initiative on Advancing Educational Equity, Excellence, and Economic Opportunity for Hispanics Presidential Advisory Commission.

== Arizona Superintendent of Public Instruction ==
Leyba Ruiz ran for Arizona Superintendent of Public Instruction in the 2026 elections. She opposed school vouchers, while Republican nominee state treasurer Kimberly Yee— who defeated incumbent superintendent Tom Horne in the Republican primary— supported them. She defeated Yee in the general election on November 3, 2026. Leyba Ruiz's election marks the first time a Latina has held the post.
