= Arizona Department of Liquor Licenses and Control =

State agency

Department overview
- Formed: 1939
- Jurisdiction: State of Arizona
- Headquarters: 800 W. Washington, 5th Floor; Phoenix, Arizona
- Department executive: Ben Henry, Director
- Website: azliquor.gov

Map

The Department of Liquor Licenses and Control is an Arizona state agency responsible for reviewing state liquor applications and issuing renewal licenses. In Arizona, there are 17 different license categories – airplanes, trains, watercraft, restaurants, liquor stores and other retailers, hotels, bars, distillers, distributors, and special events.

== Organisation ==
The agency is organised into three divisions as follows:

- The Administration Division provides daily departmental operations including budget, personnel, payroll, purchasing, and accounting. Under Administration is the department’s compliance function. Compliance governs the dispute-resolution process to offer an alternative, when appropriate, to the more costly and time-consuming formal hearing process. The mandate of the Compliance Officer is to arbitrate cases and attempt a fair resolution.
- The Licensing Division issues, transfers, renew and audits the various types of licenses. These procedures involve meeting with the applicants and assisting them with the application forms, answering questions about the licensing process, fees, notarization, and audits.
- The Investigations Division is responsible for ensuring that all licensees statewide adhere to A.R.S. Title 4 and all rules promulgated by the Department. These responsibilities include training and assisting local law enforcement communities; contact with licensees through random routine license inspections; investigate and process all complaints received; provide background checks on applicants for liquor licenses; cooperate with the Department of Public Safety and local law enforcement agencies on covert and underage buy programs; research and respond to inquiries from manufacturers, wholesalers and retailers and provide law enforcement trained speakers for various industry functions upon request.

== Arizona State Liquor Board ==
The Arizona State Liquor Board is an independent body that hears appeals and may overturn or amend decisions made by the Director of the Department of Liquor. The seven members of the ASLB are appointed by the Governor and confirmed by the Senate for three-year terms.
