= Jeff DeWit =

American politician (born 1972)

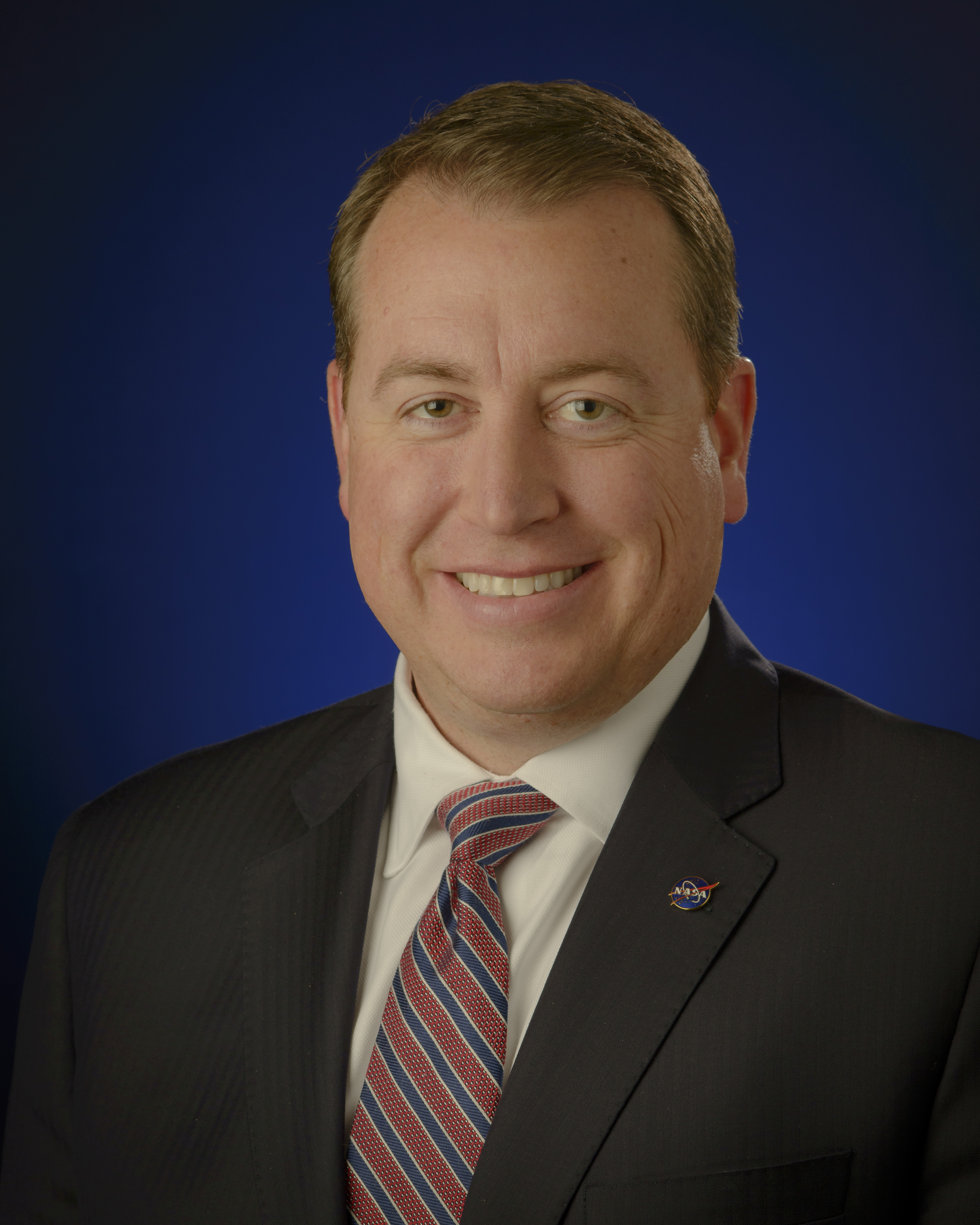
- Official portrait, 2018

Chair of the Arizona Republican Party
- In office January 28, 2023 – January 24, 2024
- Preceded by: Kelli Ward
- Succeeded by: Jill Norgaard (acting)

Chief Financial Officer of NASA
- In office April 3, 2018 – February 14, 2020
- President: Donald Trump
- Preceded by: Elizabeth Robinson
- Succeeded by: Melanie Saunders (acting)

43rd Treasurer of Arizona
- In office January 5, 2015 – April 3, 2018
- Governor: Doug Ducey
- Preceded by: Doug Ducey
- Succeeded by: Mark Swenson (Acting); Eileen Klein

Personal details
- Born: December 21, 1972 (age 53)
- Party: Republican
- Spouse: Marina DeWit
- Education: University of Southern California (BS)

Jeffrey James DeWit (born December 21, 1972) is an American businessman and politician who served as the chair of the Arizona Republican Party from January 2023 to January 2024. A member of the Republican Party, DeWit became the State Treasurer of Arizona in 2015, succeeding Doug Ducey. DeWit said in 2016 that he did not plan to seek re-election in 2018. In 2017, President Trump nominated him to be chief financial officer of NASA. His nomination as chief financial officer of NASA was confirmed by the U.S. Senate in March 2018. He resigned from NASA in February 2020 and joined Trump's 2020 campaign later that year.

== Early life and education ==
DeWit received his degree in business administration and finance from the University of Southern California, and began his career in 1992 at Smith Barney Shearson. In 1999, DeWit started a stock trading company called ECHOtrade, serving as its CEO for over 14 years.

== Political career ==
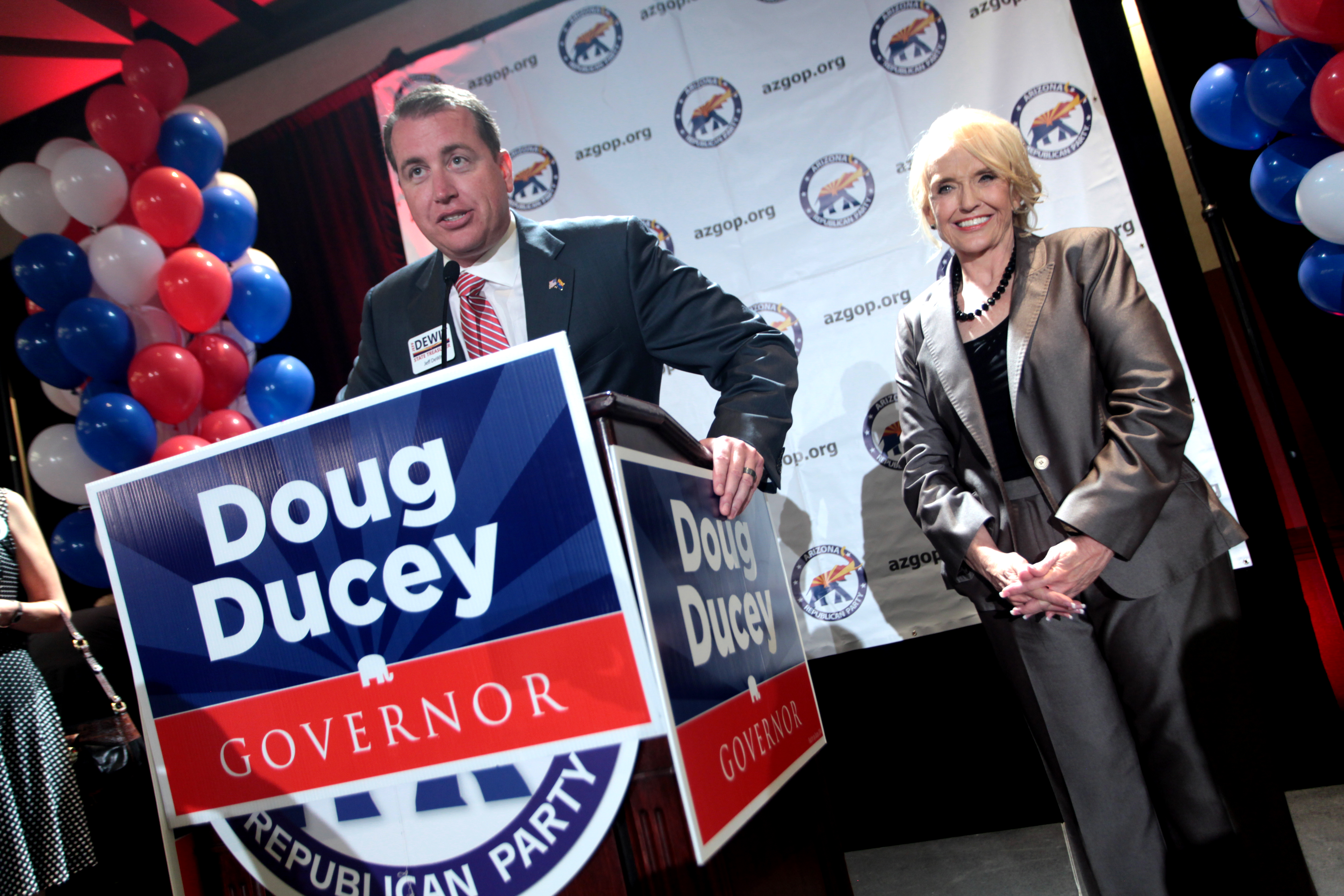
Jeff DeWit with Governor Jan Brewer after winning the Republican primary for State Treasurer on August 26, 2014.

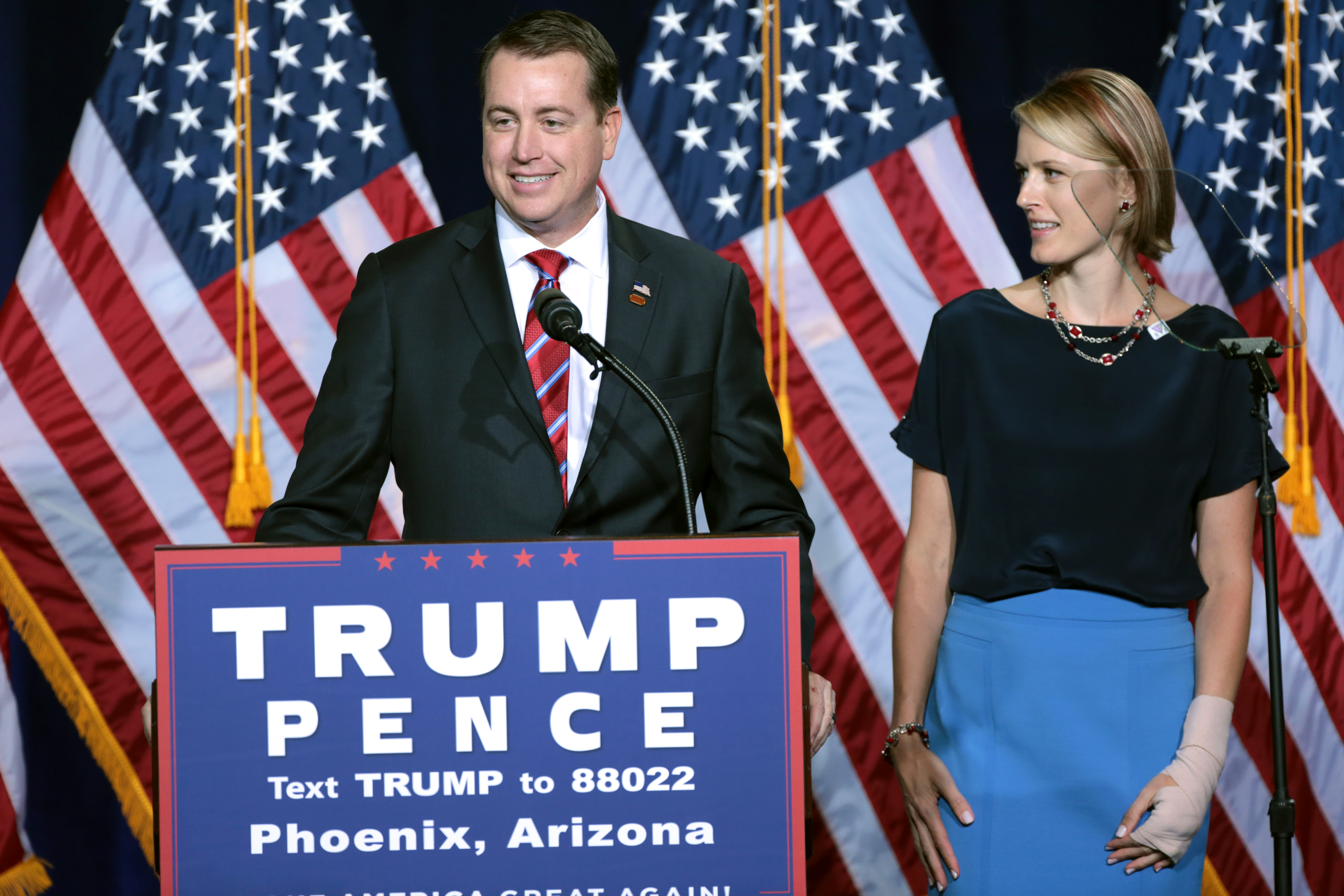
Jeff DeWit with his wife Marina speaking at a campaign rally for Donald Trump in Phoenix, Arizona.

In politics, DeWit has served as a Precinct Committeeman, State Committeeman, and was also appointed by the Chairman of the Arizona Republican Party to serve on the party's Redistricting Committee.

In 2014, he sought the office of Treasurer for the state of Arizona, a position being vacated by Doug Ducey, who instead ran for Governor of Arizona after serving for one term. DeWit won the Republican primary in August, defeating former Tempe Mayor Hugh Hallman and former state party Chairman Randy Pullen by a large margin. DeWit was unopposed in the general election, and was therefore the presumptive Treasurer of the State of Arizona.

DeWit also served as the chair of Donald Trump's 2016 presidential campaign in Arizona. He said in 2016 that he had no plans to seek reelection at the end of his term as State Treasurer as he disliked the "favor-factory" mentality of established politicians, whose ranks he had no desire to join.

DeWit was nominated by President Trump to become Chief Financial Officer of the National Aeronautics and Space Administration on December 1, 2017. His nomination was returned unconfirmed to the President by the U.S. Senate on January 3, 2018, under Standing Rules of the United States Senate, Rule XXXI, paragraph 6. The nomination was resubmitted to the Senate on January 8, 2018. He was confirmed by voice vote on March 14, 2018. He took office on April 3, 2018. DeWit resigned on February 13, 2020.

On June 30, 2020, it was reported that DeWit was named the chief operating officer of the Donald Trump 2020 presidential campaign.

=== State party chair ===
On January 28, 2023, DeWit was elected chair of the Arizona Republican Party.

== Kari Lake audio recording ==
On January 23, 2024, an audio recording of a conversation between DeWit and Kari Lake, the party's nominee for Arizona Governor in 2022 and party candidate for the U.S. Senate in 2024, was leaked. In the recording, DeWit is heard offering Lake job opportunities, suggesting she take a break from politics. After Lake refuses, DeWit asks her, "Is there a number at which..." To which Lake responds, "I can be bought? No." DeWit continues to ask for a "counter-offer".

After the release of the audio recordings, Lake insisted DeWit should resign from his position in the Arizona Republican Party. DeWit complied, claiming Lake's team threatened to release another incriminating audio recording if he didn't. Lake's advisers Caroline Wren and Garrett Ventry said on Twitter, "No one from the Kari Lake campaign threatened or blackmailed DeWit."

DeWit resigned on January 24, 2024.

== Personal life ==
DeWit resides in Peoria, Arizona with his wife, Marina and his three daughters. As a part of his election campaign, his family appeared in a music video parody of Frozen.

== Electoral history ==
2014 Arizona State Treasurer election, Republican primary, 2014
| Party | Candidate | Votes | % |
|---|---|---|---|
| Republican | Jeff DeWit | 215,892 | 44.90 |
| Republican | Hugh Hallman | 155,775 | 32.40 |
| Republican | Randy Pullen | 108,106 | 22.49 |
| Write-in | | 1,011 | 0.21 |
| Total votes | | 480,784 | 100.00 |

Arizona State Treasurer election, 2014
| Party | Candidate | Votes | % |
|---|---|---|---|
| Republican | Jeff DeWit | 1,063,472 | 99.12 |
| Write-in | | 9,461 | 0.88 |
| Total votes | | 1,072,933 | 100.00 |
| Republican hold | | | |

Political offices
| Preceded by Doug Ducey | Treasurer of Arizona; 2015–2018 | Succeeded by Mark Swenson; Acting |
Party political offices
| Preceded by Kelli Ward | Chair of the Arizona Republican Party; 2023–2024 | Succeeded by Jill Norgaard; Acting |
