= Eileen Klein =

American politician

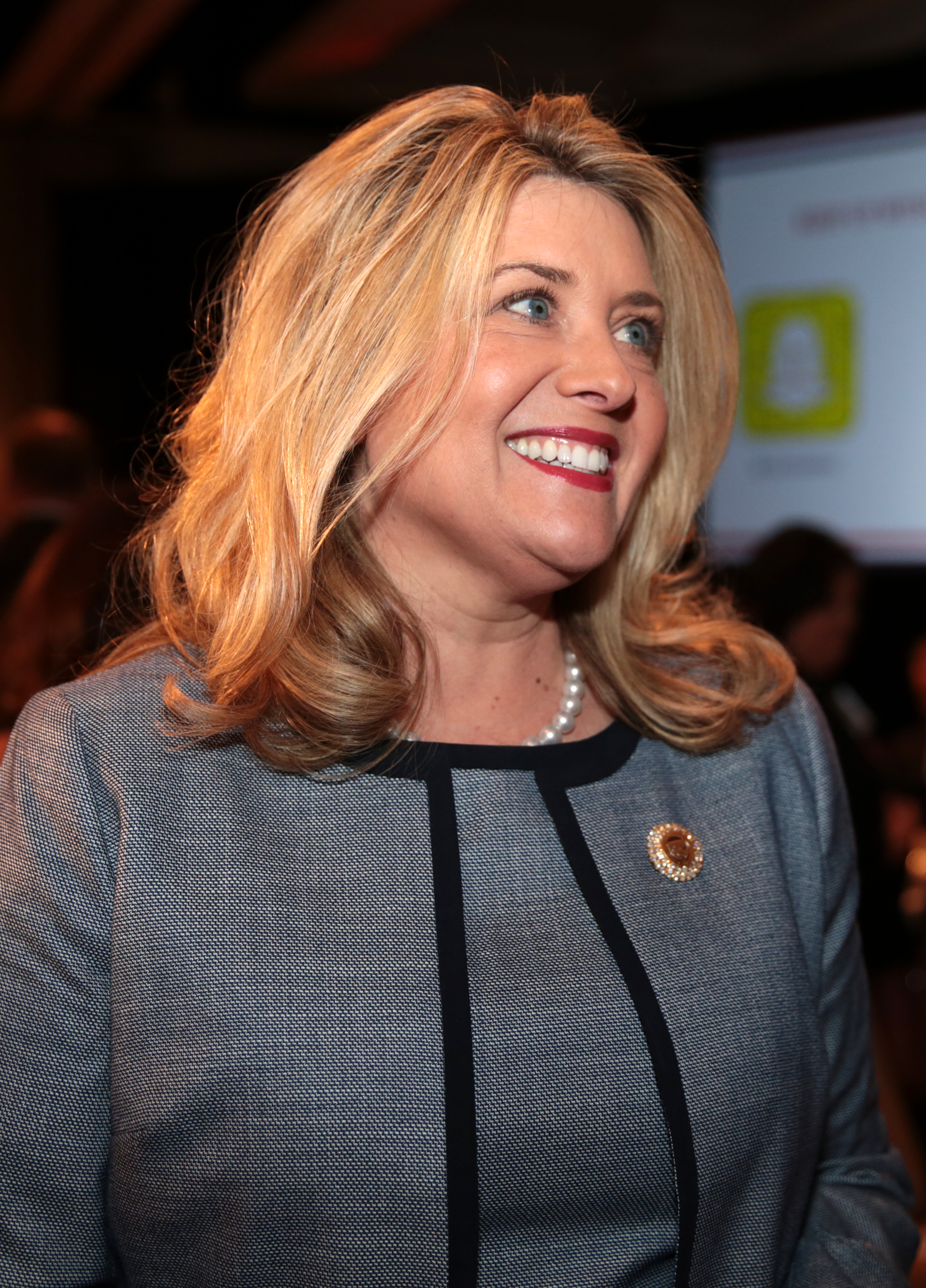
- Klein in 2018

44th Treasurer of Arizona
- In office April 17, 2018 – January 7, 2019
- Governor: Doug Ducey
- Preceded by: Jeff DeWit
- Succeeded by: Kimberly Yee

Personal details
- Party: Republican
- Education: Florida State University, Tallahassee (BA); Arizona State University, Tempe (MPA)

Eileen Klein is an American politician from the state of Arizona who served as the State Treasurer from 2018 to 2019. A member of the Republican Party, she was appointed to replace Jeff DeWit, who resigned to become the CFO of NASA. Previously, Klein had been a member of the Arizona Board of Regents, serving as that board's president.

== Education ==
Klein graduated from Florida State University and holds a Master of Public Administration from Arizona State University.

== Career ==
Klein served as Chief Operating Officer and vice president for UnitedHealthcare Arizona Physicians IPA. In 2009, Klein became chief of staff for Governor Jan Brewer. Klein became president of the Arizona Board of Regents in 2013.

Political offices
Preceded by Jeff DeWit	Treasurer of Arizona; 2018–2019	Succeeded by Kimberly Yee
