= Arizona School Facilities Board =

State agency

The Arizona School Facilities Board is a state agency of the U.S. state of Arizona. It finances the construction of new public district schools.
