= Kimberly Yee =

American politician (born 1974)

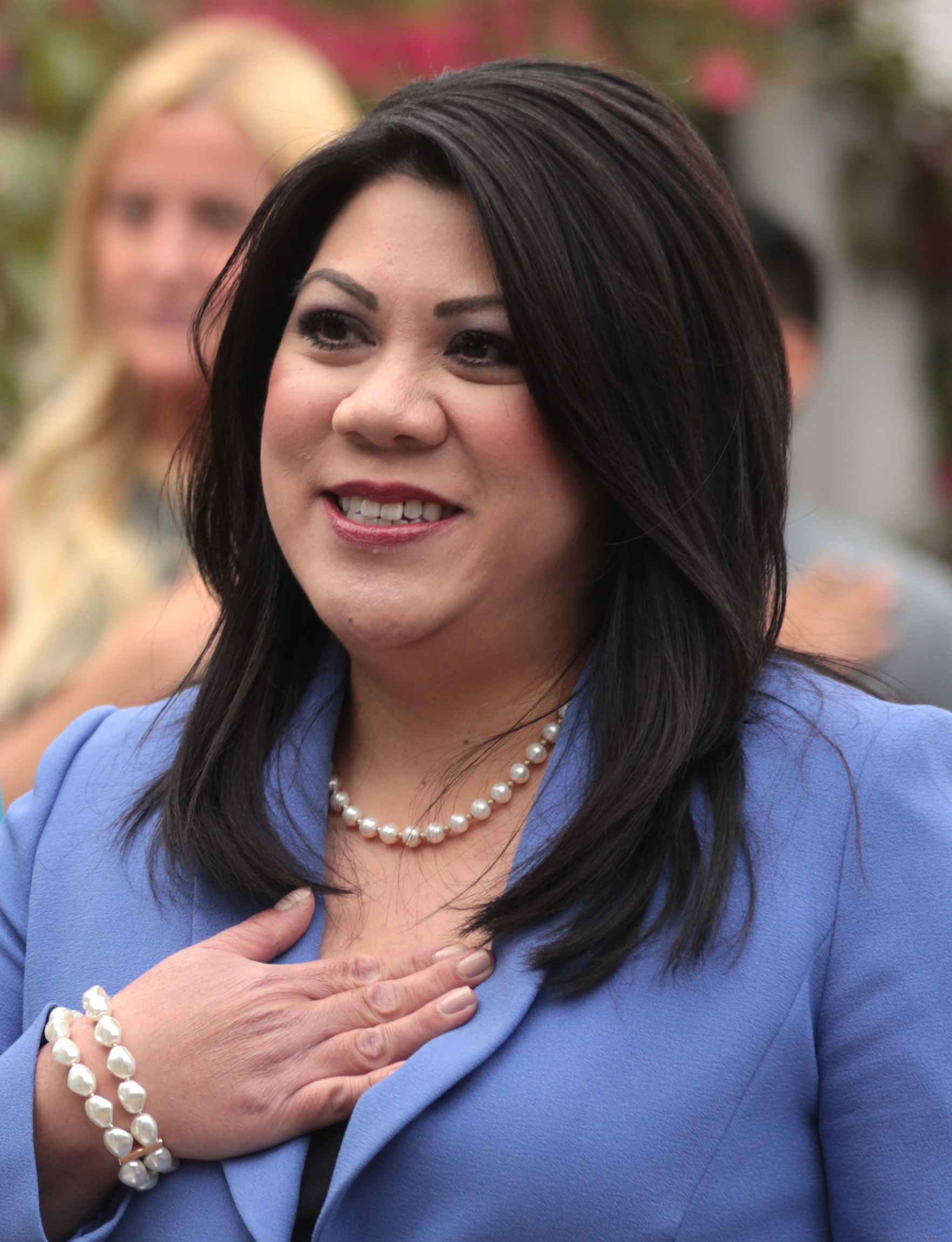
- Yee in 2021

45th Treasurer of Arizona
- Incumbent
- Assumed office January 7, 2019
- Governor: Doug Ducey; Katie Hobbs
- Preceded by: Eileen Klein

Majority Leader of the Arizona Senate
- In office January 9, 2017 – January 7, 2019
- Preceded by: Steve Yarbrough
- Succeeded by: Rick Gray

Member of the Arizona Senate from the 20th district
- In office January 14, 2013 – January 7, 2019
- Preceded by: John McComish
- Succeeded by: Paul Boyer

Member of the Arizona House of Representatives from the 10th district
- In office January 10, 2011 – January 14, 2013 Serving with James Weiers
- Preceded by: Doug Quelland
- Succeeded by: Stefanie Mach

Personal details
- Born: February 23, 1974 (age 52) Phoenix, Arizona, U.S.
- Party: Republican
- Spouse: Nelson Mar
- Education: Pepperdine University (BA); Arizona State University, Tempe (MPA)

Chinese name
- Traditional Chinese: 余豔芬
- Simplified Chinese: 余艳芬
Transcriptions
Standard Mandarin
- Hanyu Pinyin: Yú Yànfēn
Yue: Cantonese
- Yale Romanization: Yue Yim-fan

Kimberly Yee (born February 23, 1974) is an American politician serving as the 45th Arizona state treasurer. Previously, she served in the Arizona House of Representatives for the 10th legislative district from 2011 to 2013 and the Arizona Senate for the 20th legislative district from 2013 until 2019. Yee is the first Asian-American woman elected to the Arizona State Legislature. She is a member of the Republican Party.

Yee was first elected to the Arizona House in 2010, and later to the Arizona Senate in 2012, where she served three terms before being elected state treasurer in 2018. She was re-elected treasurer in 2022. She was the Republican nominee for Arizona Superintendent of Public Instruction in 2026, having defeated incumbent Tom Horne in the primary. She was defeated in the general election by Democrat Teresa Leyba Ruiz.

== Early life and education ==
Yee was born and raised in Phoenix, Arizona; she traces her ancestry to Taishan, Guangdong. Yee attended Greenway High School in Phoenix where she was a student journalist at the Demon Dispatch in the early 1990s. Yee is a graduate of Pepperdine University where she earned a bachelor's degree in political science and a bachelor's degree in English. She also holds a master's degree in public administration from Arizona State University's School of Public Affairs, and was the recipient of the honored Scholar-Citizen Award.

== Career ==
Yee worked for California Republican governors Pete Wilson and Arnold Schwarzenegger. She was then communications director at the office of the state treasurer of Arizona. Upon the recommendation of Republican Governor Jan Brewer, Yee was appointed by the Maricopa County Board of Supervisors to replace Republican representative Doug Quelland after he was ousted for violating Clean Election Limits.

Yee served as state committeeman for the Arizona Republican Party, chair of the Arizona Legislative District 10 Republican Committee, and delegate for Arizona at the 2008 Republican National Convention.

As a member of the Arizona House of Representatives in 2011, Kimberly Yee was the sponsor of the "Ultrasound and Heartbeat Bill" which required doctors to provide women with the option to have an ultrasound image before proceeding with an abortion. The bill passed and was signed into law.

Yee was an invited speaker at the 2016 Republican National Convention.

Yee represented District 20 in the Arizona Senate from 2013 to 2019. Yee also served as state Senate majority leader from 2017 to 2019. She became the second woman elected to this position in Arizona’s history, following U.S. Justice Sandra Day O’Connor who served the position in 1973, forty-four years earlier.

On November 29, 2017, she announced her candidacy for the position of Arizona state treasurer. Yee was elected Arizona treasurer on November 6, 2018.

In 2019, she implemented Senate Bill 1184, which required college students to pass a course in economics that includes financial literacy and personal finance management in order to graduate. Yee went on to create a statewide literacy task force, a 16-member board assigned the job of identifying the scope of financial literacy and proposing solutions for improvement.

During the 2020 presidential campaign, she served nationally as a Co-Chairwoman of the Asian Pacific Americans for Trump Coalition and as a Member of the Pro-Life Voices for Trump Coalition.

On May 17, 2021, Yee announced her candidacy for governor of Arizona in the 2022 Arizona gubernatorial election. She later dropped out of the governor's race, running for re-election as Arizona state treasurer.

On May 28, 2025, Yee announced she would challenge incumbent Republican state superintendent Tom Horne in the 2026 Arizona Superintendent of Public Instruction election. She announced her campaign alongside state senator Jake Hoffman and listed expanding school choice and school voucher programs as goals.

=== Elections ===
- 2010 Challenging House District 10 incumbent Republican representatives Doug Quelland and James Weiers in the four-way August 24, 2010 Republican primary, Representative Weiers placed first, Yee placed second with 6,925 votes, and Representative Quelland placed third; in the November 2, 2010 General election, Yee took the first seat with 19,485 votes and Representative Weiers took the second seat ahead of Democratic nominees former representative Jackie Thrasher and Aaron Jahneke.
- 2012 With Republican senator John McComish redistricted to District 18, Yee was unopposed for the Senate District 20 August 28, 2012 Republican primary, winning with 15,519 votes; and won the three-way November 6, 2012 General election with 37,371 votes against Democratic nominee Michael Powell and former Republican representative Doug Quelland running as an Independent.
- 2014 Senate District 20 Yee won reelection against Democratic candidate Patty Kennedy. Yee winning with 25,103 votes against Kennedy's 16,613 votes.
- 2016 Senate District 20 Yee won reelection against Democratic candidate Larry Herrera. Yee winning 40,122 votes against Herrera's 28,987 votes.
- 2018 General election for Arizona Treasurer on November 6, 2018, Yee defeated Mark Manoil.
- 2022 General election Yee won reelection for Arizona Treasurer on November 8, 2022, defeating Martín Quezada.

Arizona Senate
Preceded by Steve Yarbrough	Majority Leader of the Arizona Senate; 2017–2019	Succeeded by Rick Gray
Political offices
Preceded by Eileen Klein	Treasurer of Arizona; 2019–present	Incumbent
