= State Treasurer of Arizona =

Chief banker and investment officer for the state of Arizona

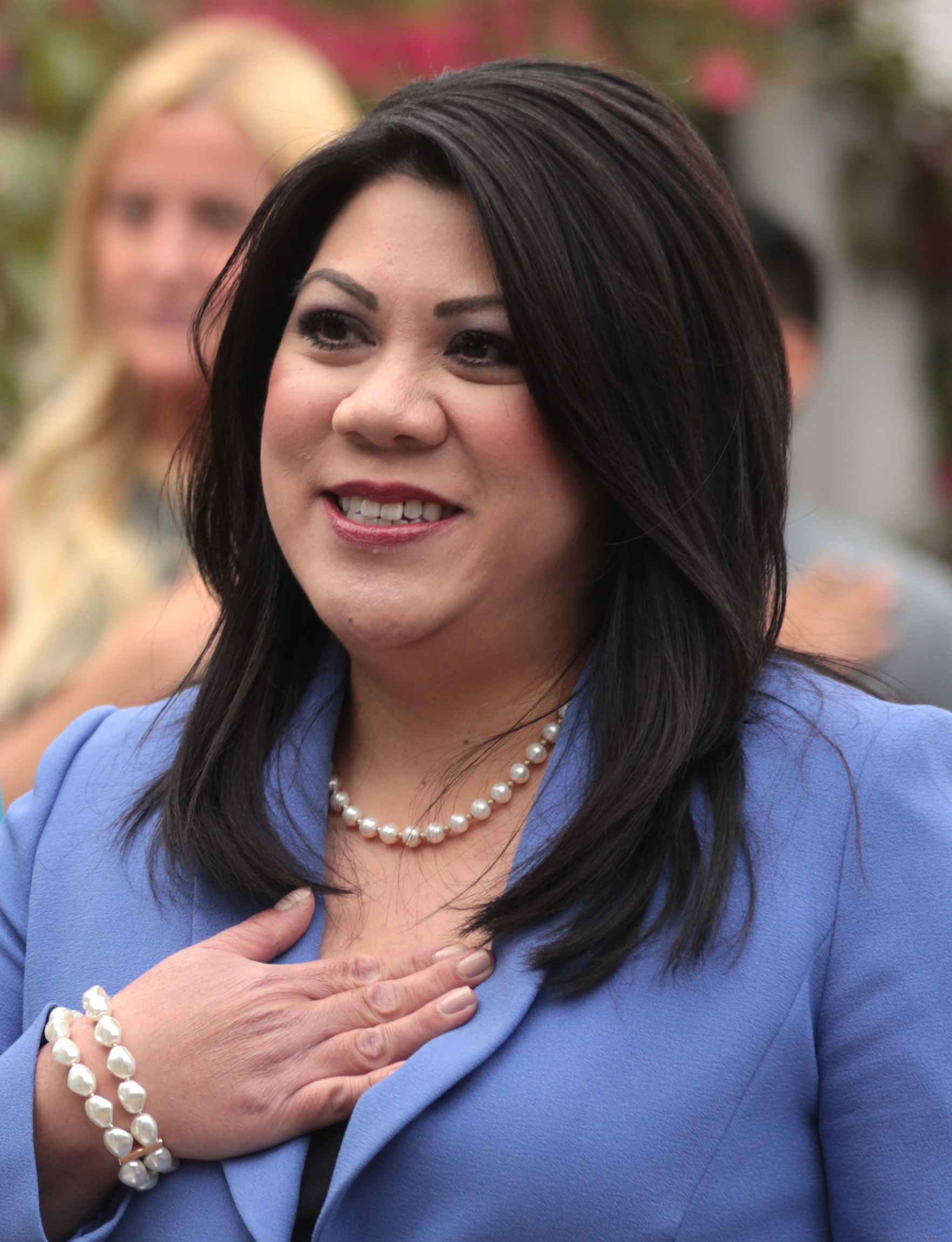
- Incumbent; Kimberly Yee since January 7, 2019
- Style: The Honorable
- Residence: Phoenix, Arizona
- Term length: Four years, can succeed self once; eligible again after a 4-year respite
- Formation: 1912
- Succession: Third
- Deputy: Mark Swenson
- Salary: $70,000
- Website: aztreasury.gov

The state treasurer of Arizona is a constitutional officer in the executive branch of government of the U.S. state of Arizona. Forty-five individuals have occupied the office of state treasurer since statehood. The incumbent is Kimberly Yee, a Republican.

Republicans have held the office without interruption since 1967, holding it for longer than any other statewide office in Arizona.

== Election and term of office ==
The state treasurer is one of six statewide elected officials and serves a term of four years. A person may only serve as state treasurer for two consecutive terms.

== Powers and duties ==
The state treasurer is the chief banker and investment officer for the state of Arizona. In this capacity, the state treasurer receives payments made to the state, accounts for and manages the state's cash flows, provides banking services to state agencies, directs and administers the investment of the state's approximately $95.9 billion portfolio, and disburses public monies in payment of warrants drawn by the General Accounting Office, Arizona's comptroller. (Note: Assets under management include the working capital of the state of Arizona’s governmental and proprietary funds along with agency-specific trust funds, the permanent land endowment fund, Arizona’s tax-advantaged college savings plan, and the local government investment pool. However, the state treasurer does not invest state pensions; fiduciary responsibility for that fund instead rests with the Arizona State Retirement System, an independent state agency which administers pensions for state and local government employees plus public school teachers.)

Functional responsibilities aside, the state treasurer is ex officio chairperson of the Board of Investment and a member of both the State Selection Board and the Board of Loan Commissioners. These bodies prescribe investment policies for the state investment portfolio, select or cause for the withdrawal and survey of trust lands granted to Arizona by Congress, and manage state indebtedness, respectively. The state treasurer is also third (after the secretary of state and attorney general) in the line of succession to the office of governor of Arizona.

== List of State Treasurers of Arizona ==
#	Image	Name	Political Party	Term of Office
1		David F. Johnson	Democratic	1912–1915
2		Mit Simms	Democratic	1915–1917
3		David F. Johnson	Democratic	1917–1919
4		Harry S. Ross	Democratic	1919–1921
5		Raymond R. Earhart	Democratic	1921–1923
6		Wayne Hubbs	Democratic	1923–1925
7		Vernon S. Wright	Democratic	1925–1927
8		J. C. Callaghan	Democratic	1927–1929
10		Charles R. Price	Democratic	1929–1931
11		Mit Simms	Democratic	1931–1933
12		W. M. Cox	Democratic	1933–1935
13		Mit Simms	Democratic	1935–1937
14		Harry M. Moore	Democratic	1937–1939
15		William G. Petersen	Democratic	1939–1941
16		Joe Hunt	Democratic	1941–1943
17		James D. Brush	Democratic	1943–1944
18		Alva E. Weaver	Democratic	1944–1945
19		William T. Brooks	Democratic	1945–1947
20		Mit Simms	Democratic	1947–1949
21		J. W. Kelly	Democratic	1949–1951
22		E. T. Williams, Jr.	Democratic	1951–1953
23		J. W. Kelly	Democratic	1953–1955
24		E. T. Williams, Jr.	Democratic	1955–1957
25		J. W. Kelly	Democratic	1957–1959
26		H. Y. Sprague	Democratic	1959–1960
27		John Quebedeaux	Republican	1960–1961
28		J. W. Kelly	Democratic	1961–1963
29		Milton J. Husky	Democratic	1963–1965
30		Bob Kennedy	Democratic	1965–1967
31		Charles H. Garland	Republican	1967–1969
32		Morris A. Herring	Republican	1969–1971
33		Ernest Garfield	Republican	1971–1973
34		Bart Fleming	Republican	1973–1979
35		Clark Dierks	Republican	1979–1983
36		Ray Rottas	Republican	1983–1991
37		Tony West	Republican	1991–1999
38		Carol Springer	Republican	1999–2003
39		David Petersen	Republican	2003–2006
40		Elliott Hibbs	Republican	2006–2007
41		Dean Martin	Republican	2007–2011
42		Doug Ducey	Republican	2011–2015
43		Jeff DeWit	Republican	2015–2018
44		Eileen Klein	Republican	2018–2019
45		Kimberly Yee	Republican	2019–present
