= 2018 Arizona Superintendent of Public Instruction election =

- November 6, 2018
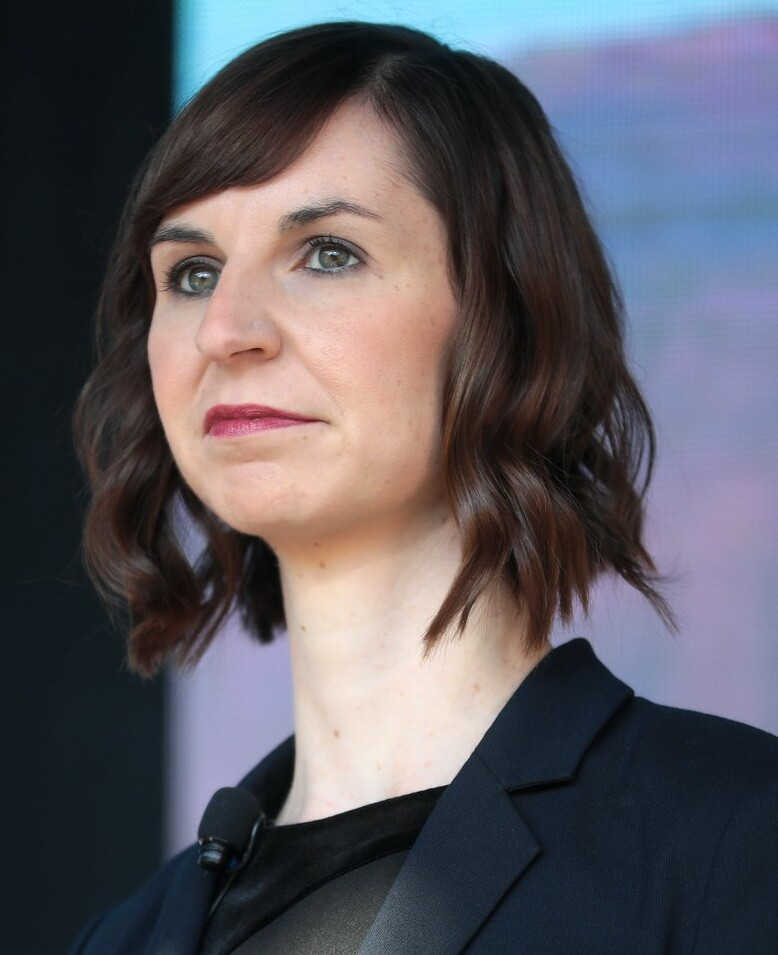

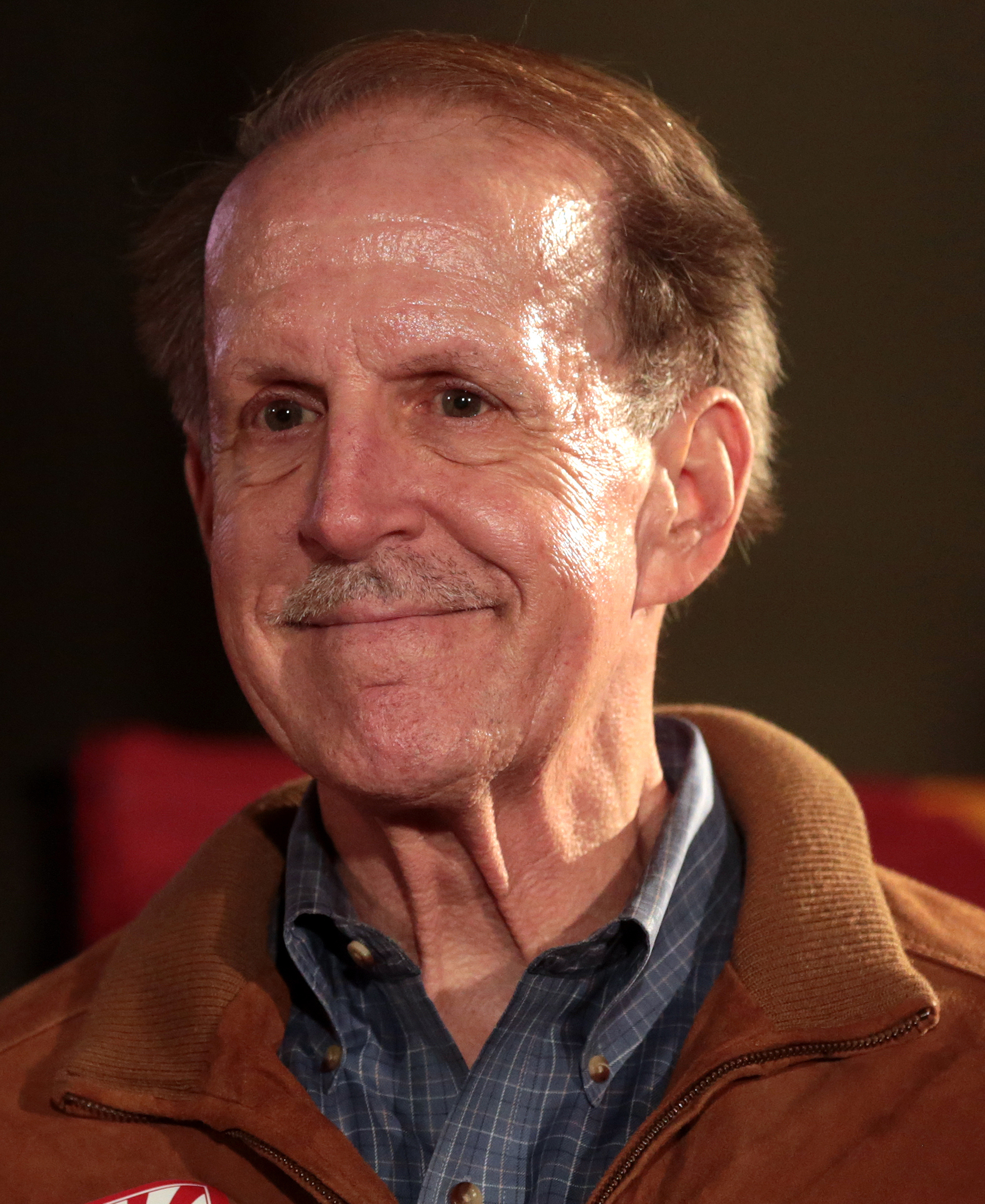
Nominee	Kathy Hoffman	Frank Riggs
Party	Democratic	Republican
Popular vote	1,185,457	1,113,781
Percentage	51.6%	48.4%
- County results Hoffman: 50–60% 60–70% 70–80% Riggs: 50–60% 60–70% 70–80%
Superintendent before election
Diane Douglas
Republican
Elected Superintendent
Kathy Hoffman
Democratic

The 2018 Arizona Superintendent of Public Instruction election took place on November 6, 2018, to elect the Arizona Superintendent of Public Instruction, concurrently with the election of Arizona's Class I U.S. Senate seat, as well as other elections to the United States Senate in other states and elections to the United States House of Representatives and various state and local elections. Hoffman was the first Democrat elected to this position since 1990.

== Republican primary ==
=== Candidates ===
==== Nominee ====
- Frank Riggs, former U.S. representative for California's 1st congressional district (1995–1999), candidate for US Senate for California in 1998, and candidate for Arizona Governor in 2006 and 2014

==== Eliminated in primary ====
- Tracy Livingston, board member of the Maricopa County Community College District
- Robert Branch, Grand Canyon University professor
- Jonathan Gelbart, charter school director
- Diane Douglas, incumbent superintendent

=== Endorsements ===
Tracy Livingston

Federal officials

- Debbie Lesko, U.S. Representative

State and local officials

- Lisa Graham Keegan, former Superintendent of Public Instruction
- Jaime Molera, former Superintendent of Public Instruction
- Steven Yarbrough, President of Arizona Senate
- Sylvia Allen, state senator
- Karen Fann, state senator
- JD Mesnard, Arizona House Speaker
- Kevin Payne, state representative.
- Vince Leach, state representative.
- Todd Clodfelter, state representative.
- Paul Boyer, state representative
- Drew John, state representative.
- David Livingston, state representative
- Sal Dicicio, Phoenix City Councilman
Frank Riggs

Individuals

- Ernest Garfield, former State Treasurer
- Adam Kwasman, former state representative.
- Jim Waring, Phoenix City Councilman and former state senator.
- Jake Hoffman, Queen Creek Town Councilman.
- Jared Taylor, Gilbert Town Councilman.
- Jim Lane, Mayor of Scottsdale
Jonathan Gelbart

Individuals

- James Kolbe, former Congressman
- Rich Crandall, former State Senator
- Kevin Thompson, Mesa City Councilmember
- Chris Glover, Mesa City Councilmember

=== Results ===
Results by county (all counties are won with 20–30% of the vote): Riggs: Branch: Douglas:

Republican primary results
Party	Candidate	Votes	%
Republican	Frank Riggs	124,872	21.82%
Republican	Bob Branch	124,623	21.78%
Republican	Diane Douglas (incumbent)	121,452	21.22%
Republican	Tracy Livingston	115,778	20.23%
Republican	Jonathan Gelbart	85,511	14.94%
Total votes		572,236	100.0%

== Democratic primary ==
=== Candidates ===
==== Nominee ====
- Kathy Hoffman, speech-language pathologist at Peoria Unified School District

==== Eliminated in primary ====
- David Schapira, former state senator (2011–2013)

=== Results ===
Results by county: Hoffman—50–60% Hoffman—60–70% Schapira—50–60%

Democratic primary results
Party	Candidate	Votes	%
Democratic	Kathy Hoffman	254,566	52.27%
Democratic	David Schapira	232,419	47.73%
Total votes		486,985	100.0%

== General election ==
=== Polling ===
Poll source	Date(s) administered	Sample size	Margin of error	Frank Riggs (R)	Kathy Hoffman (D)	Undecided
OH Predictive Insights	September 5–6, 2018	597 (LV)	± 4.0%	41%	39%	20%

=== Results ===
Arizona Superintendent of Public Instruction, 2018
Party	Candidate	Votes	%	±%
Democratic	Kathy Hoffman	1,185,457	51.56%	+2.11%
Republican	Frank Riggs	1,113,781	48.44%	−2.11%
Write-in		89	0.0%	N/A
Total votes		2,299,327	100.0%	
Democratic gain from Republican				
