= Diana Bishop (disambiguation) =

Diana Bishop (born 1947) is a British Olympic rower.

Diana Bishop may also refer to:

- Diana Bishop (actress), who featured in the 1981 radio series The Lord of the Rings
- Diana Bishop, the main character in the All Souls trilogy, and in the TV series based on the novels

== See also ==
- C. Diane Bishop (born 1943, American politician in Arizona
