= 2020 Phoenix mayoral election =

- November 3, 2020
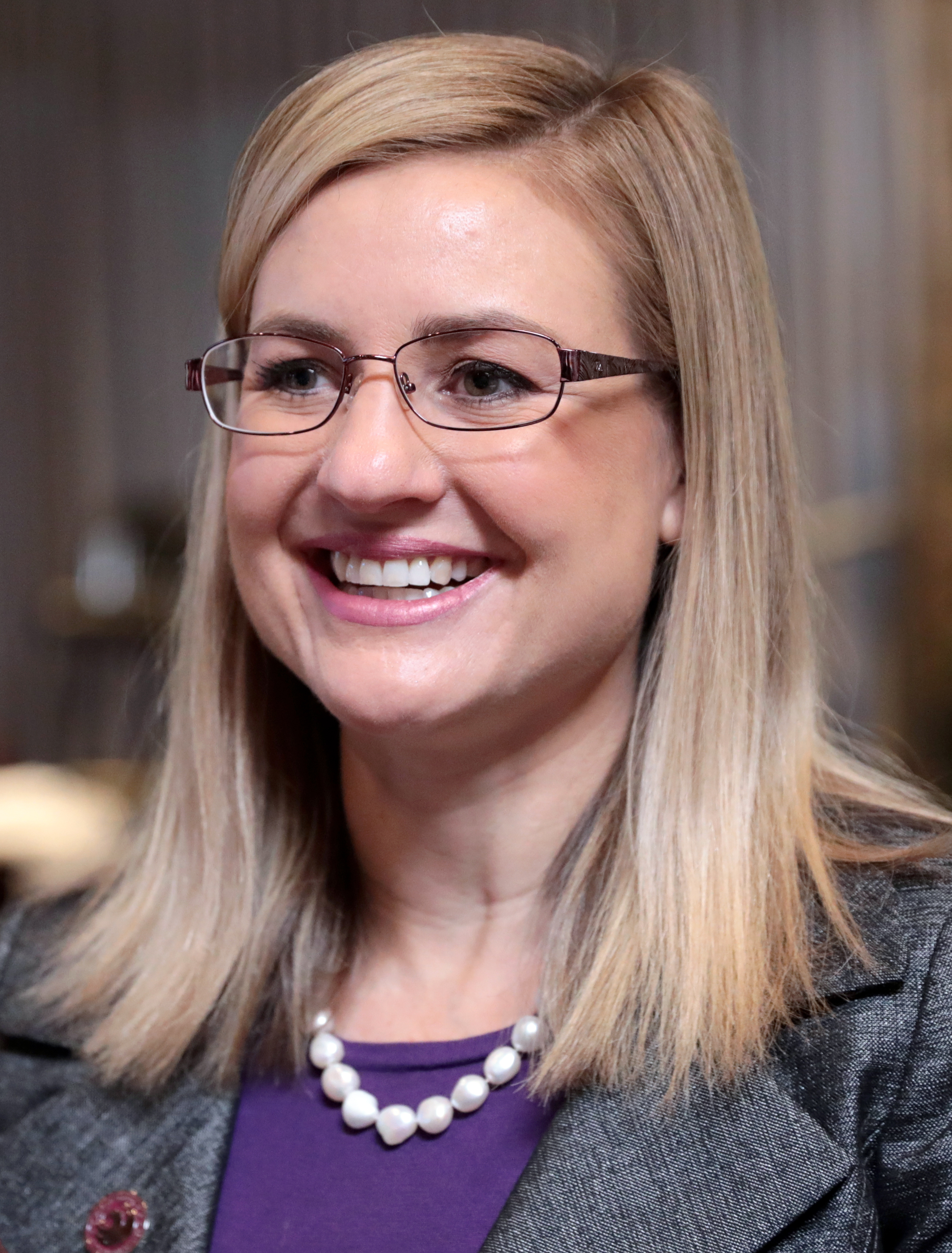

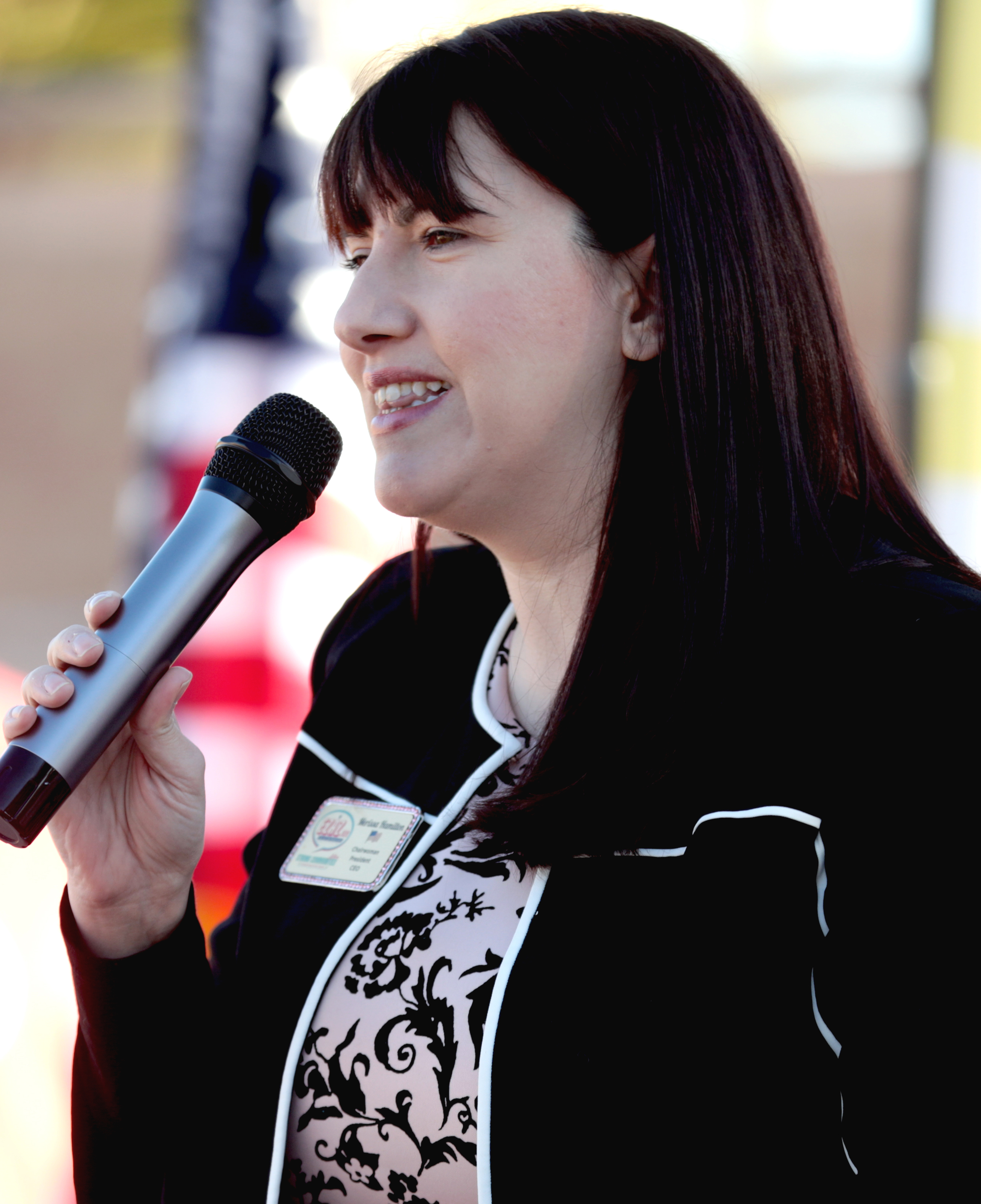

Candidate	Kate Gallego	Merissa Hamilton	Tim Seay
Popular vote	349,959	152,172	72,280
Percentage	60.9%	26.5%	12.6%
- Precinct results Gallego: 40–50% 50–60% 60–70% 70–80% 80–90% Hamilton: 40–50% >90% No votes
Mayor before election
Kate Gallego
Democratic
Elected mayor
Kate Gallego
Democratic

The 2020 Phoenix mayoral election took place on November 3, 2020, to elect the Mayor of Phoenix, Arizona. The election was held concurrently with elections to City Council Districts 1, 3, 5, and 7.

The election was officially nonpartisan. Incumbent mayor Kate Gallego was re-elected with an absolute majority of the vote. Therefore, a runoff election was not held on March 9, 2021.

Incumbent mayor Kate Gallego was first elected in a 2019 special election held due to the resignation of mayor Greg Stanton.

== Candidates ==
=== Declared ===
- Kate Gallego, incumbent Mayor
- Merissa Hamilton, businesswoman and chair of the Arizona State Legislature sub-committee on policing
- Tim Seay, businessman
- Juan Schoville, indie music producer & martial artist (Write-in)
- Joshua "Crisco Kidd" Carmona, radio personality of 98.3 FM (Write-in)

== General election ==
=== Results ===
2020 Phoenix mayoral election
Candidate	Votes	%
Kate Gallego (incumbent)	349,959	60.9%
Merissa Hamilton	152,172	26.5%
Tim Seay	72,280	12.6%
Total votes	574,411	100.0%

== See also ==
- List of mayors of Phoenix
