= Toles =

Toles or Tole is a surname. It is derived from either Greek Tolis (a short form of the personal name Apostolis), from an alternate form of the English surname Tole (from the Old English personal name Tola, or Tolles), or also from Scandinavian origin (Old Norse Toli), or from India.

Notable people with the surname include:

- Alvin Toles (born 1963), American football player
- Andrew Toles (born 1992), American baseball player
- Barbara Toles (born 1956), Democratic representative of the Wisconsin State Assembly
- Elsie Toles (1888-1957), Arizona's superintendent of public instruction, professor, and author
- Tom Toles (born 1951), American political cartoonist
- Shubha Tole (born 1967) Indian neuroscientist
