= 2022 Arizona Superintendent of Public Instruction election =

- November 8, 2022
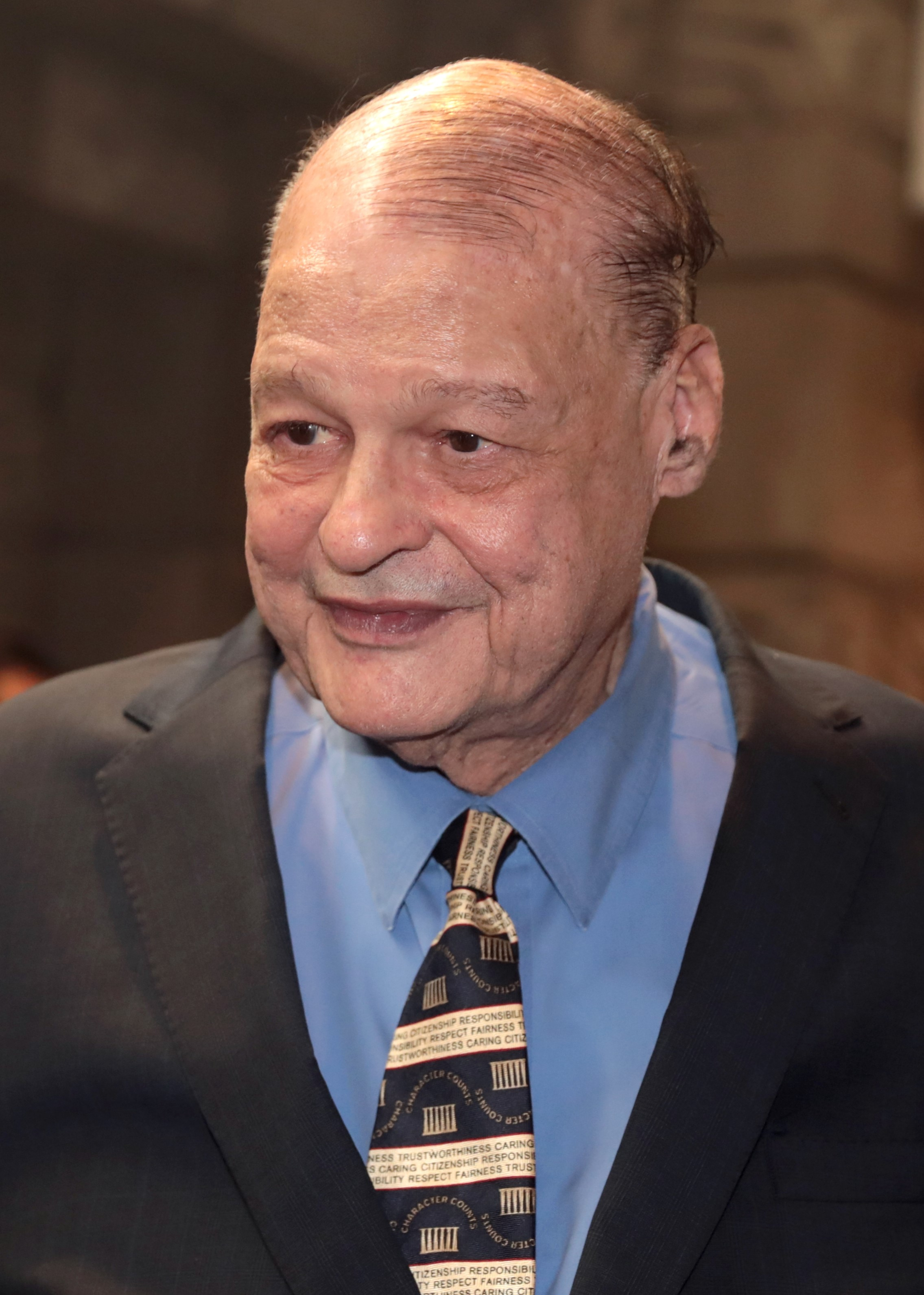

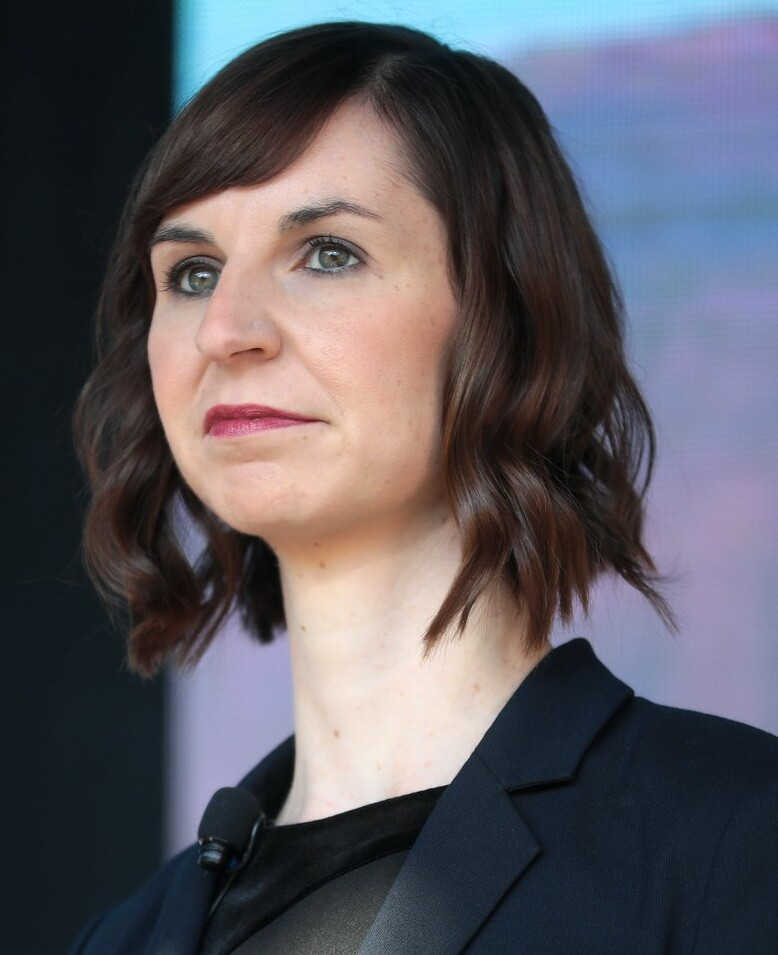
Nominee	Tom Horne	Kathy Hoffman
Party	Republican	Democratic
Popular vote	1,256,406	1,247,218
Percentage	50.17%	49.82%
- Horne: 50–60% 60–70% 70–80% 80–90% >90% Hoffman: 50–60% 60–70% 70–80% 80–90% >90% Tie: 50% No votes
Superintendent before election
Kathy Hoffman
Democratic
Elected Superintendent
Tom Horne
Republican

The 2022 Arizona Superintendent of Public Instruction election took place on November 8, 2022, to elect the Superintendent of Public Instruction of Arizona. Incumbent Democratic Superintendent Kathy Hoffman was narrowly defeated in her run for a second term by former Republican Attorney General Tom Horne.

== Democratic primary ==
=== Candidates ===
==== Nominee ====
- Kathy Hoffman, incumbent superintendent

=== Results ===
Democratic primary results
Party	Candidate	Votes	%
Democratic	Kathy Hoffman (incumbent)	564,099	100.0%
Total votes		564,099	100.0%

== Republican primary ==
=== Candidates ===
==== Nominee ====
- Tom Horne, former superintendent and former Arizona Attorney General

==== Eliminated in primary ====
- Shiry Sapir, real estate manager
- Michelle Udall, state representative from the 25th district

==== Did not file ====
- Michael Trevillion, assistant principal

=== Polling ===
Poll source	Date(s) administered	Sample size (Note: Key: A – all adults RV – registered voters LV – likely voters V – unclear)	Margin of error	Tom Horne	Shiry Sapir	Michelle Udall	Other	Undecided
Rasmussen Reports	July 27–28, 2022	710 (LV)	± 4.0%	38%	18%	16%	6%	22%
OH Predictive Insights	July 27, 2022	502 (LV)	± 4.4%	21%	21%	14%	–	44%
OH Predictive Insights	June 30 – July 2, 2022	515 (LV)	± 4.3%	18%	7%	9%	–	66%
OH Predictive Insights	April 4–5, 2022	500 (LV)	± 4.4%	16%	2%	8%	7% (Note: Kim Fisher with 4%, Kara Woods with 3%, Jennie Paperman with 0%)	67%

=== Results ===
Republican primary results
Party	Candidate	Votes	%
Republican	Tom Horne	321,208	41.92%
Republican	Shiry Sapir	256,286	33.45%
Republican	Michelle Udall	188,401	24.59%
Write-in		258	0.03%
Total votes		766,153	100.0%

== Libertarian primary ==
=== Candidates ===
==== Eliminated in primary ====
- Sheila Reid-Shaver, Maricopa County precinct committeeman (write-in)

=== Results ===
Libertarian primary results
Party	Candidate	Votes	%
Libertarian	Sheila Reid-Shaver (write-in)	557	100.0%
Total votes		557	100.0%

== General election ==
=== Polling ===
Poll source	Date(s) administered	Sample size	Margin of error	Kathy Hoffman (D)	Tom Horne (R)	Other	Undecided
Data Orbital (R)	November 4–6, 2022	550 (LV)	± 4.3%	44%	49%	2% (Note: "Refused" with 2%)	6%
HighGround Inc.	November 1–2, 2022	500 (LV)	± 4.4%	41%	46%	1% (Note: "Some other candidate" with 1%)	12%
Data Orbital (R)	October 17–19, 2022	550 (LV)	± 4.3%	43%	45%	2% (Note: "Refused" with 2%)	10%
HighGround Inc.	October 12–13, 2022	500 (LV)	± 4.4%	40%	43%	2% (Note: "Some other candidate" with 2%)	14%

=== Certified results ===
2022 Arizona Superintendent of Public Instruction election
Party	Candidate	Votes	%	±%
Republican	Tom Horne	1,255,977	50.17%	+1.73%
Democratic	Kathy Hoffman (incumbent)	1,247,010	49.82%	−1.74%
Republican	Patrick Finerd (write-in)	213	0.01%	N/A
Total votes		2,503,200	100.0%	

=== Recount ===
On December 5, 2022, following election certification, Secretary of State Katie Hobbs petitioned the Maricopa County Superior Court to initiate a recount for the Superintendent of Public Instruction election. On the same day, Maricopa County Superior Court Judge Timothy J. Thomason ordered for the recount to begin. Although Hoffman had already conceded the election, the recount proceeded as the margin between the two candidates was 0.35%, which falls in the threshold to trigger an automatic recount.

On December 29, Thomason announced the results of the recount, confirming Horne as the winner with an increased margin of 9,188 votes.

2022 Arizona Superintendent of Public Instruction election
Party	Candidate	Votes	%	±%
Republican	Tom Horne	1,256,406	50.13%	+1.69%
Democratic	Kathy Hoffman (incumbent)	1,247,218	49.76%	−1.80%
Write-in		2,900	0.12%	+0.12%
Total votes		2,506,524	100.0%	
Republican gain from Democratic				

By county

County	Kathy Hoffman Democratic		Tom Horne Republican		Others	
County	#	%	#	%	#	%
Apache	17,337	65.61%	9,030	34.17%	57	0.22%
Cochise	18,457	39.85%	27,767	59.95%	90	0.19%
Coconino	33,526	60.56%	20,151	36.4%	116	0.21%
Gila	7,756	34.73%	14,554	65.17%	24	0.11%
Graham	3,223	29.95%	7,525	69.93%	13	0.12%
Greenlee	941	39.05%	1,465	60.79%	4	0.17%
La Paz	1,632	29.86%	3,828	70.03%	6	0.11%
Maricopa	763,704	50.78%	738,713	49.12%	1,601	0.11%
Mohave	19,400	24.16%	60,812	75.73%	90	0.11%
Navajo	18,291	44.65%	21,692	53.61%	82	1.74%
Pima	233,592	59.33%	159,638	40.55%	459	0.12%
Pinal	58,919	41.31%	83,533	58.57%	169	0.12%
Santa Cruz	8,441	65.94%	4,343	33.93%	17	0.13%
Yavapai	42,628	35.50%	77,326	64.40%	126	0.10%
Yuma	19,371	42.62%	26,029	57.27%	46	0.11%
Totals	1,247,218	49.76%	1,256,406	50.13%	2,900	0.12%

==== By congressional district ====
Despite losing the state, Hoffman won five of nine congressional districts, including two that elected Republicans.

District	Hoffman	Horne	Representative
1st	51%	49%	David Schweikert
2nd	45%	55%	Tom O'Halleran (117th Congress)
2nd	45%	55%	Eli Crane (118th Congress)
3rd	76%	24%	Ruben Gallego
4th	56%	44%	Greg Stanton
5th	43%	57%	Andy Biggs
6th	51%	49%	Ann Kirkpatrick (117th Congress)
6th	51%	49%	Juan Ciscomani (118th Congress)
7th	66%	34%	Raúl Grijalva
8th	44%	56%	Debbie Lesko
9th	36%	64%	Paul Gosar

== See also ==
- 2022 Arizona elections
