= 2018–19 Phoenix mayoral special election =

2018–2019 Phoenix mayoral special election
- November 6, 2018 (first round); March 12, 2019 (runoff)
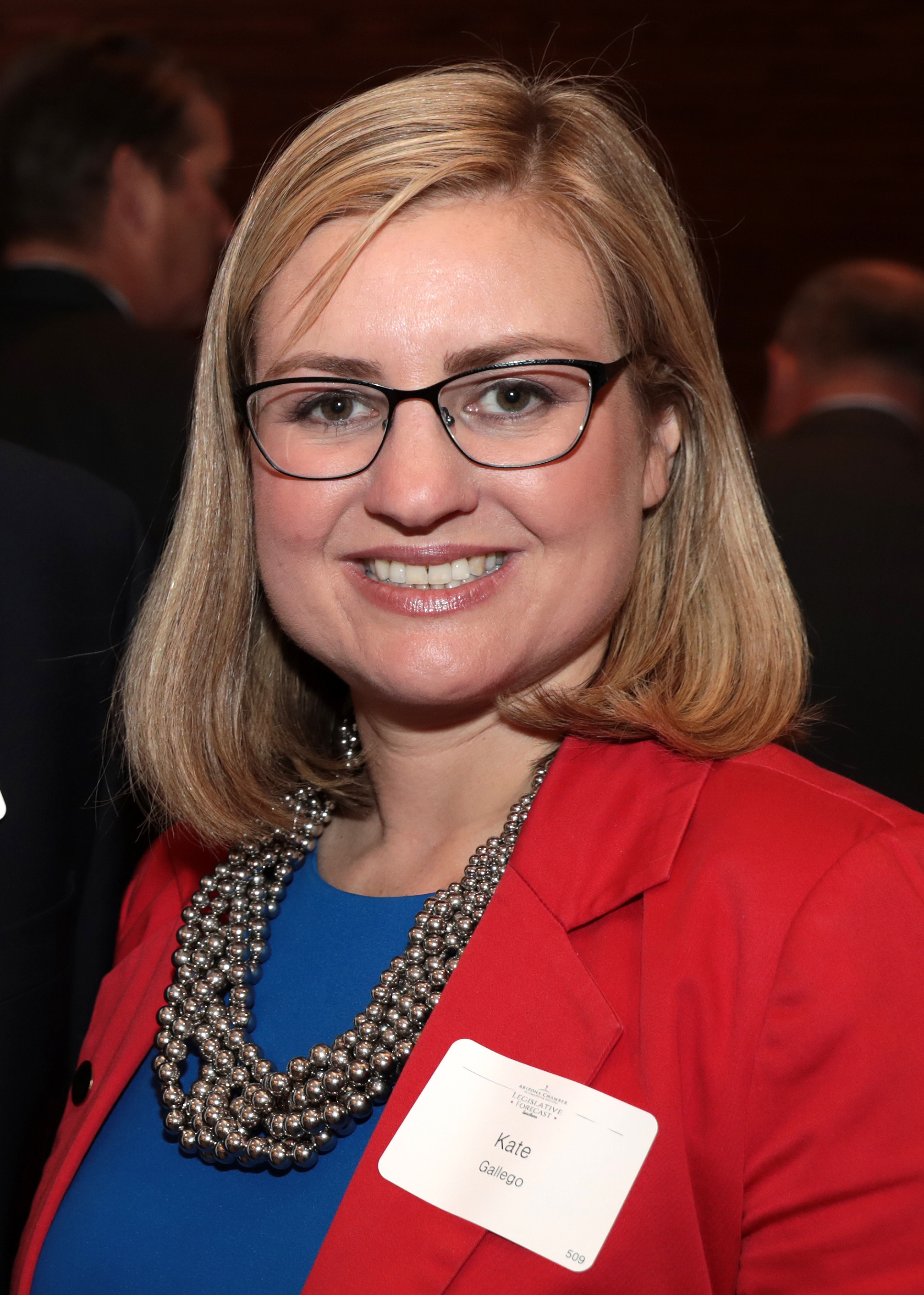

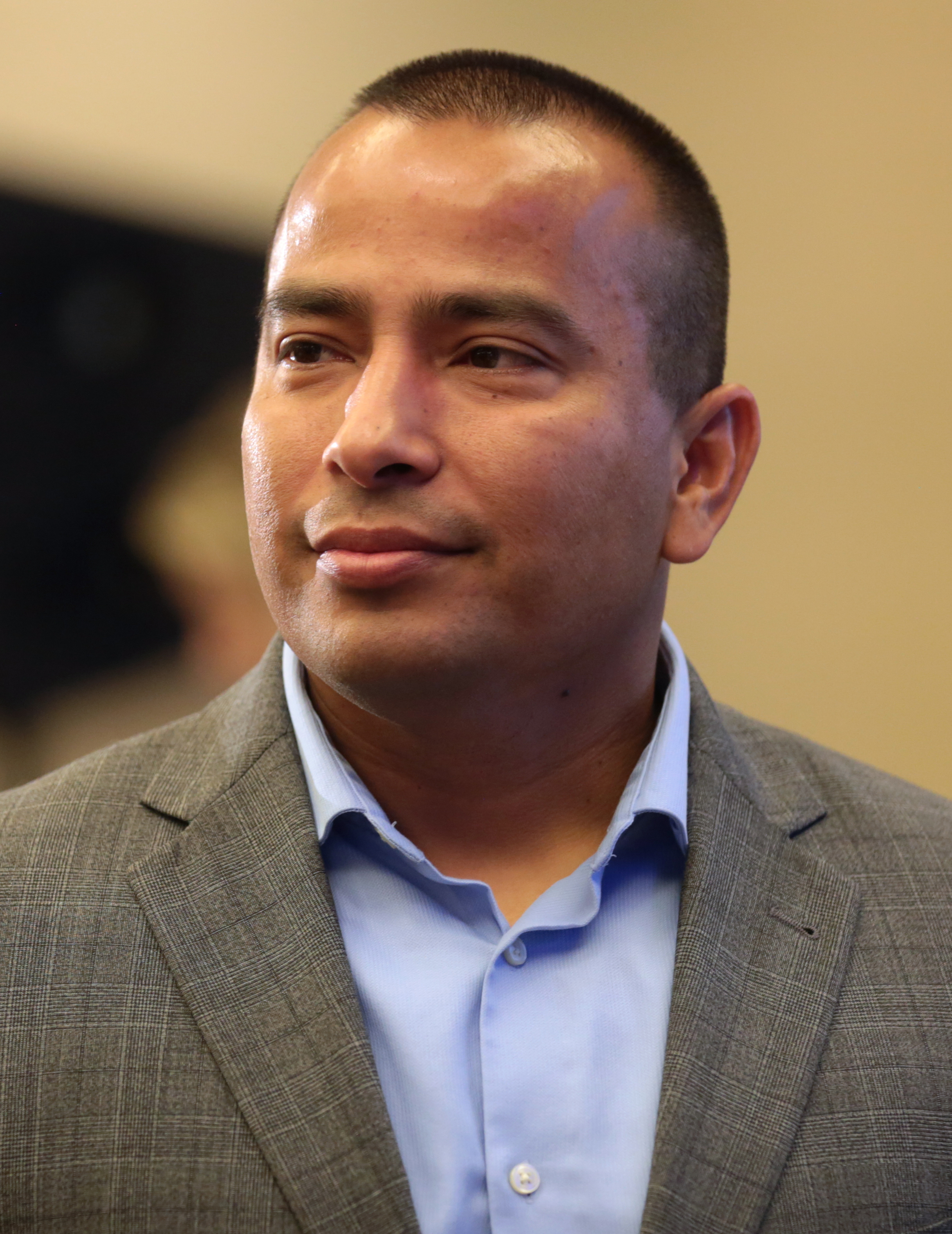

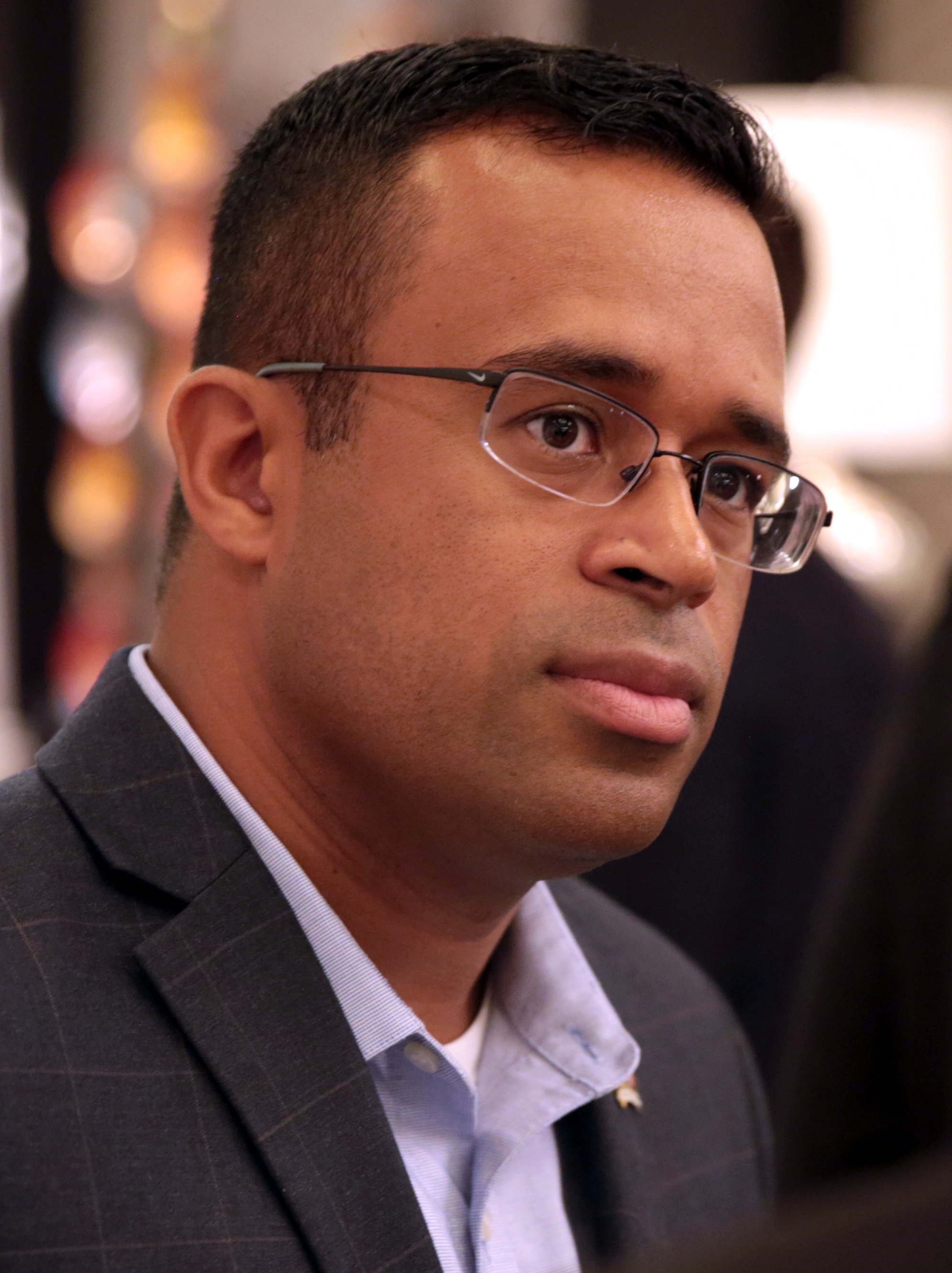

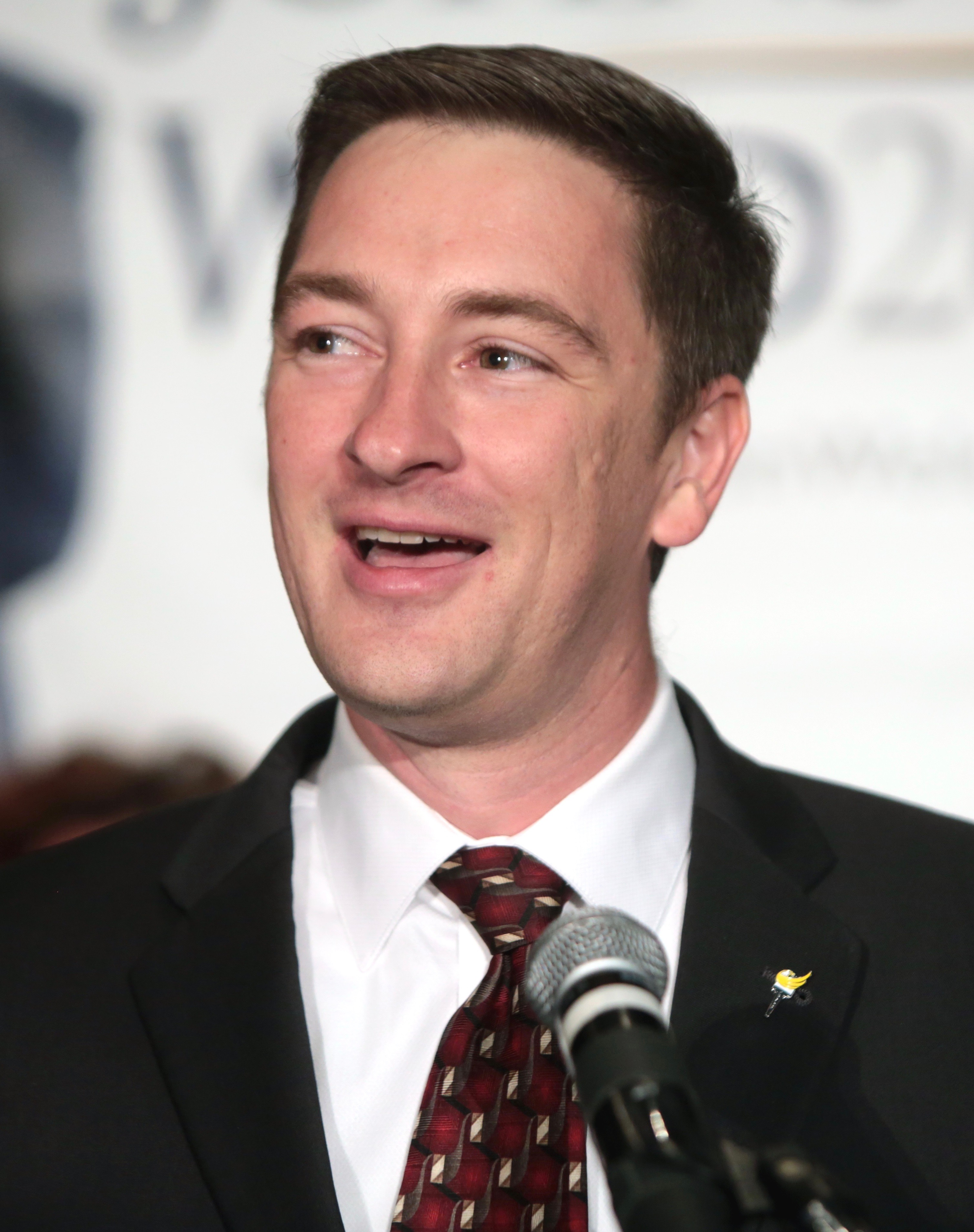
| Candidate | Kate Gallego | Daniel Valenzuela |
| First round | 171,035; 44.5% | 100,998; 26.3% |
| Runoff | 106,216; 58.4% | 75,532; 41.6% |
| Candidate | Moses Sanchez | Nicholas Sarwark |
| First round | 71,121; 18.5% | 40,218; 10.5% |
| Runoff | Eliminated | Eliminated |
- Runoff results by city council district Gallego: 50–60% 60–70% Valenzuela: 50–60%
Mayor before election
Thelda Williams (interim)
Republican
Elected mayor
Kate Gallego
Democratic

The 2018–19 Phoenix mayoral special election was held on November 6, 2018, to elect the new Mayor of Phoenix, Arizona. The election was officially nonpartisan; candidates ran on the same ballot. In the initial round of the election, since no candidate reached 50 percent plus one vote (as required by Phoenix City Charter), a runoff election was held on March 12, 2019, between the top two finishers.

In October 2017, then incumbent mayor Greg Stanton announced that he was running for the United States Congress in Arizona's 9th district, which includes much of Phoenix. Stanton resigned effective May 29, 2018, triggering a special election. The top two candidates from that election, Kate Gallego and Daniel Valenzuela, both fell short of the required 50 percent of the vote, therefore the mayoral race was decided by a final runoff election, which Gallego won.

Phoenix councilwoman Thelda Williams served as temporary mayor until Gallego took office.

== Candidates ==
=== Declared ===
- Kate Gallego, former Phoenix City Councilwoman, District 8 (Democratic)
- Moses Sanchez, Navy veteran, businessman, former local high school board member (Republican)
- Nicholas Sarwark, attorney and chair of the Libertarian National Committee (Libertarian)
- Daniel Valenzuela, former Phoenix City Councilman, District 5 (Democratic)

=== Not qualified for ballot ===
- Tim Seay, freemason and businessman

=== Withdrew ===
- Michael Lafferty, businessman (Independent)

=== Declined ===
- Sal DiCiccio, Phoenix City councilman, District 6 (Republican)
- Michael Nowakowski, Phoenix City Councilman, District 7 (Democratic)
- Laura Pastor, Phoenix City councilman, District 4 (Democrat)
- Tom Simplot, former Phoenix City Councilman (Independent)

== Polling ==
| Poll source | Date(s) administered | Sample size | Margin of error | Kate Gallego | Michael Nowakowski* | Laura Pastor* | Daniel Valenzuela | None of the above | Undecided |
|---|---|---|---|---|---|---|---|---|---|
| Rose Law Group | October 12, 2017 | 517 | ± 5.3% | 8.9% | 12.4% | 14.9% | 17.6% | 22.1% | 24% |

- * Denotes candidates who did not enter the race.

== Endorsements ==
Nicholas Sarwark

U.S. Governors

- Bill Weld, former Governor of Massachusetts and Libertarian Party vice-presidential nominee in 2016

US Representatives

- Barry Goldwater Jr., former U.S. Representative from California 1969–1983

City Council people

- Clint Olivier, City Council representative for the City of Fresno's Seventh council district since 2010, Fresno City Council President from 2012–2013

Individuals

- Michael Langley, former candidate for city council in Phoenix
- Roy Miller, consultant
Kate Gallego

Former Phoenix mayors

- Kenn Weise

Federal officials

- Ron Barber, former congressman
- Sam Coppersmith, former congressman
- Ruben Gallego, congressman; candidate's ex-husband
- Kirsten Gillibrand, U.S. Senator
- Ann Kirkpatrick, former congresswoman
- Harry Mitchell, former congressman

State officials

- Isela Blanc, State Representative
- Kelli Butler, State Representative
- Charlene Fernandez, State Representative and Arizona House Democratic Minority Leader
- Juan Mendez, State Senator
- Lisa Otondo, State Senator
- Martin Quezeda, State Senator
- Rebecca Rios, State Senator
- Athena Salman, State Representative
- Mary Rose Wilcox, former Maricopa County Supervisor

Organizations

- Arizona Building and Construction Trades Council
- Arizona Carpenters Union #1912
- Arizona List
- EMILY's List
- International Brotherhood of Electrical Workers (IBEW) #640
- Planned Parenthood of Arizona
- Sierra Club
Moses Sanchez

Members of City Council

- Sal DiCiccio, member of Phoenix City Council since 2009
- Jim Waring, member of Phoenix City Council since 2011, former State Senator from 2003–2010

Organizations

- Arizona Republican Party
- Maricopa County Republican Party
Daniel Valenzuela

Former Phoenix mayors

- Phil Gordon
- Paul Johnson
- Skip Rimza

Current and former Phoenix City Councilmembers

- Maria Baier
- Claude Mattox
- Peggy Neely
- John Nelson
- Laura Pastor
- Deb Stark

Unions

- AFSCME
- Arizona Police Association
- Arizona-American Federation of Teachers
- Sheet Metal Workers Local 359
- Teamsters Local 104
- United Food and Commercial Workers, Local 99

Arizona state legislators

- Richard Andrade, Representative
- Sean Bowie, Senator
- Mark Cardenas, former Representative
- Lupe Contreras, Senator
- Diego Espinoza, Representative
- Katie Hobbs, Secretary of State
- Tony Navarette, Senator

== Results ==
2018–19 Phoenix mayoral special election
1st round
| Candidate | Votes | % |
|---|---|---|
| Kate Gallego | 171,035 | 44.5 |
| Daniel Valenzuela | 100,998 | 26.3 |
| Moses Sanchez | 71,121 | 18.5 |
| Nicholas Sarwark | 40,218 | 10.5 |
| Total votes | 384,454 | 100.0 |
Runoff election
| Kate Gallego | 106,216 | 58.4% |
| Daniel Valenzuela | 75,532 | 41.6% |
| Total votes | 181,748 | 100.0 |

== See also ==
- List of mayors of Phoenix
