= Kathy Hoffman =

American educator and politician (born 1985)

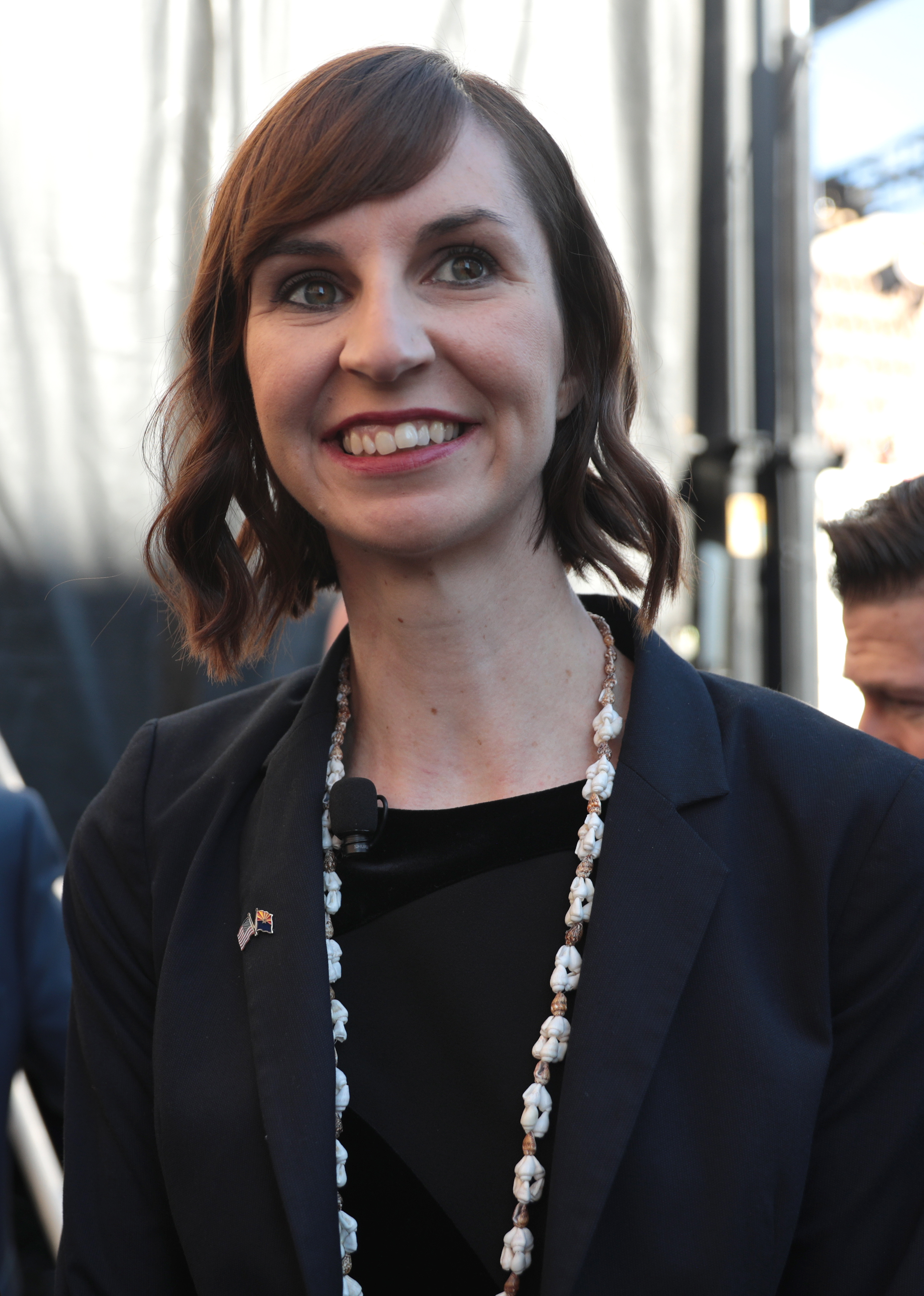

22nd Arizona Superintendent of Public Instruction
- In office January 7, 2019 – January 2, 2023
- Governor: Doug Ducey
- Preceded by: Diane Douglas
- Succeeded by: Tom Horne

Personal details
- Born: 1985 or 1986 (age 39–40) Portland, Oregon, U.S.
- Party: Democratic
- Education: University of Oregon (BA); University of Arizona (MS)

Kathy Hoffman (born 1985/1986) is an American educator, speech-language pathologist, and politician who served as the Arizona Superintendent of Public Instruction from 2019 to 2023. A member of the Democratic Party, she took her oath of office with her hand placed on top of the children's book Too Many Moose, which she states holds special significance for her and her former students.

Hoffman narrowly lost reelection in 2022.

In February 2023, Arizona State University’s Mary Lou Fulton Teachers College announced Hoffman would join the college to lead special education initiatives.

== Education and career ==
Hoffman earned a bachelor's degree in Japanese Studies at the University of Oregon in 2009 and a master's degree in speech-language pathology from the University of Arizona in 2013. She taught pre-school before beginning her career as a speech-language pathologist. Before running for office, Hoffman worked as a speech-language pathologist at Vail Unified School District and Peoria Unified School District.

Hoffman is fluent in both Japanese and Spanish.

== Superintendent of Public Instruction ==
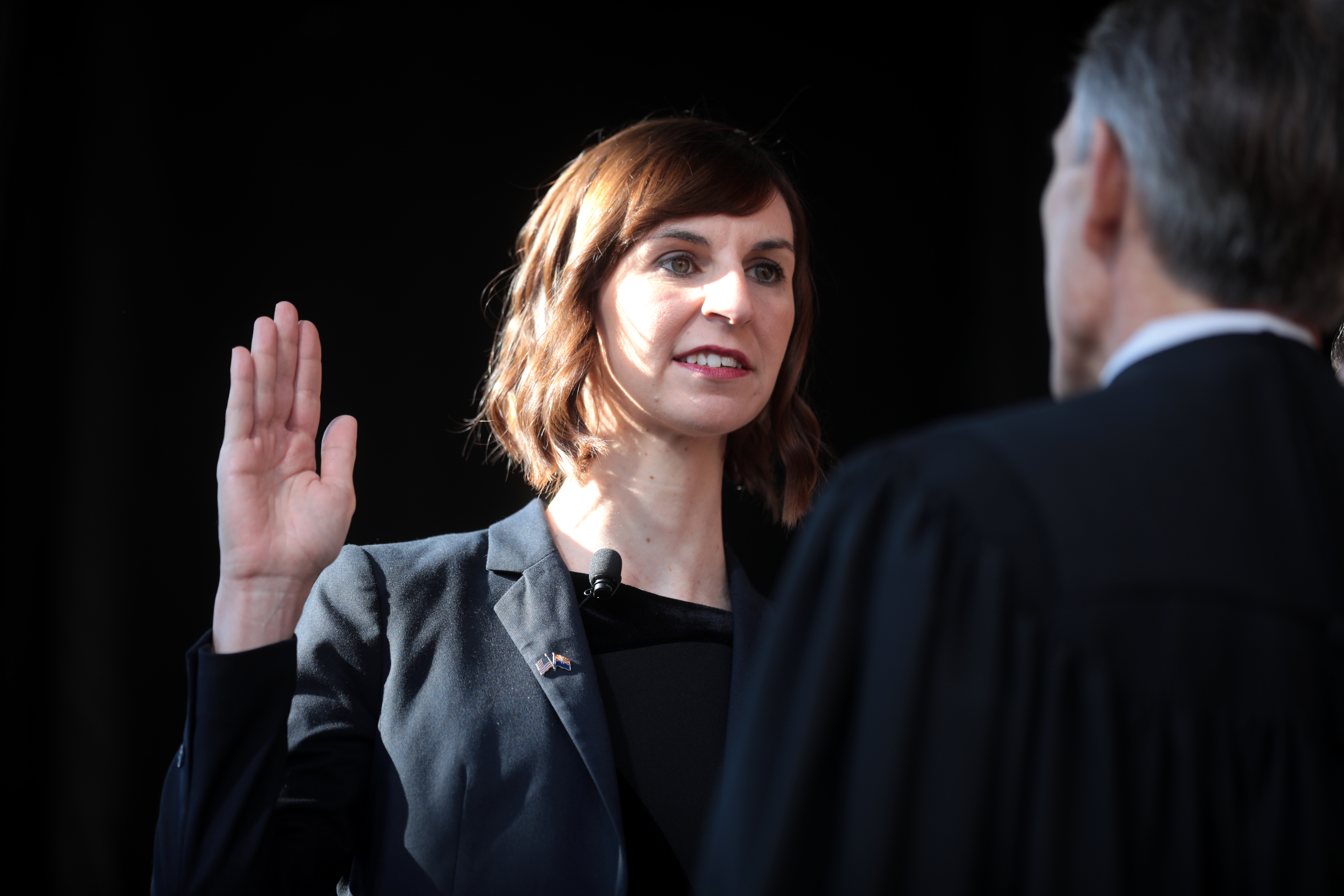
Hoffman being sworn in as Superintendent of Public Instruction

In 2018, Hoffman defeated former California Republican Congressman Frank Riggs in the race for Superintendent of Public Instruction, after Hoffman defeated former state senator David Schapira in the Democratic primary in a surprise upset. She said she was inspired to run after watching the confirmation of Betsy DeVos as Secretary of Education. Hoffman participated in Arizona’s Citizen’s Clean Election Commission’s campaign funding program, which provides some campaign funding to participating candidates who forgo special interest and high-dollar contributions, yet out-raised her opponent 2-to-1.

An effort to recall Hoffman was launched on February 11, 2021, with supporters having until June 11, 2021 to collect 574,832 signatures to initiate a recall election. Recall supporters criticized Hoffman for allegedly violating her oath of office, particularly in regard to the impact of COVID-19 in schools. The June deadline for signatures was not met and no recall election occurred. The recall effort was led by We the People AZ Alliance, an organization that promotes election fraud conspiracy theories. This group led several other failed recall attempts as well, against the Maricopa County Board of Supervisors, Democratic Secretary of State Katie Hobbs, Republican Governor Doug Ducey, and Republican State Senator Paul Boyer.

Hoffman sought reelection in 2022, but was defeated by Republican former Superintendent Tom Horne.

== Elections ==
Arizona Superintendent of Public Instruction Democratic primary election, 2018
Party	Candidate	Votes	%
Democratic	Kathy Hoffman	254,566	52.27
Democratic	David Schapira	232,419	47.73
Total votes		484,748	100.0

Arizona Superintendent of Public Instruction election, 2018
Party	Candidate	Votes	%
Democratic	Kathy Hoffman	1,185,457	51.56
Republican	Frank Riggs	1,113,781	48.44
Total votes		2,299,238	100.0

Arizona Superintendent of Public Instruction election, 2022
Party	Candidate	Votes	%
Republican	Tom Horne	1,256,406	50.13
Democratic	Kathy Hoffman (incumbent)	1,247,218	49.76
Write-in		2,900	0.12
Total votes		2,506,524	100.0

Political offices
Preceded by Diane Douglas	Arizona Superintendent of Public Instruction; 2019–2023	Succeeded by Tom Horne
