= Education Equality Project =

Education reform organization

Education Equality Project (EEP) is an education reform organization in the U.S. John Legend serves on the group's board. Lisa Graham Keegan is also involved with the group. The group's website now redirects to Stand for Children.

== See also ==
- Achievement gap in the United States
- Black Alliance for Educational Options
- Center for Education Reform
- Democrats for Education Reform
