= David Schapira =

American politician (born 1980)

Co-Chief Deputy Superintendent of Public Instruction
- Incumbent
- Assumed office January 15, 2025
- Appointed by: California State Board of Education
- Preceded by: Mary Nicely; Nancy Kim-Portillo

Member of the Arizona Senate from the 17th district
- In office January 10, 2011 – January 14, 2013
- Preceded by: Meg Burton Cahill
- Succeeded by: Ed Ableser

Member of the Arizona House of Representatives from the 17th district
- In office January 8, 2007 – January 10, 2011
- Preceded by: Meg Burton Cahill; Laura Knaperek
- Succeeded by: Ed Ableser; Ben Arredondo

Personal details
- Born: February 17, 1980 (age 46) Mesa, Arizona, U.S.
- Party: Democratic
- Spouse: Rosemary
- Children: 2
- Education: George Washington University (BA); Arizona State University, West (M.Ed); Sandra Day O'Connor College of Law (JD)

David Schatz Schapira (born February 17, 1980) is an American politician who has served as chief deputy superintendent of public instruction for the California Department of Education since 2025. He was the government relations director for the California School Employees Association from 2019 to 2024.

Schapira previously served from 2007 to 2013 as a member of the Arizona Senate, representing District 17, and served as Senate Minority Leader.

== Early life, education, and career ==
Schapira is a immigrant-descended, third-generation Arizonan who was born in Mesa, Arizona. He later moved to Tempe and then to Phoenix, where he attended North Canyon High School as an International Baccalaureate student after which he attended George Washington University, earning a degree in political science. He returned to North Canyon High School to teach after college. He earned a master's degree in Education Leadership from Arizona State University in 2015. He earned a Juris Doctor degree at the Sandra Day O'Connor College of Law at Arizona State University in 2019.

After teaching high school, Schapira taught as an adjunct faculty member at Arizona State University. He served as Assistant Superintendent at the East Valley Institute of Technology from 2013 to 2017.

== Political career ==
=== Arizona legislature ===
Schapira was first elected to the Arizona Legislature in 2006 as a member of the Arizona House of Representatives, representing the 17th district. He served two terms in the House before being elected to the Senate in 2010. As a freshman Senator, he was selected by his colleagues to serve as the Senate Minority Leader.

He served on the Appropriations Committee for his first five years in office and on the Education Committee all six years. He was the Education Committee's ranking member during his final term in the House and in the Senate. He also served on the Banking and Insurance Committee during his final year in the legislature.

In 2010, he was elected to the Tempe Union High School District Governing Board where he served until 2015. He was elected to the Tempe City Council in 2014 and served there until 2018.

=== 2012 congressional campaign ===
On August 28, 2012, Schapira lost a race for the Democratic nomination to Congress in the newly created 9th district, placing second in the three-way primary, losing to future United States Senator Kyrsten Sinema.

=== 2018 Superintendent of Public Instruction Campaign ===
Schapira was a candidate for Arizona Superintendent of Public Instruction in 2018. He ran in the Democratic primary and lost to Kathy Hoffman.

=== California ===
Schapira became the government relations director for the California School Employees Association in 2019. He was appointed chief deputy superintendent of public instruction for the California Department of Education in 2025.
