= Kate Gallego =

American politician (born 1981)

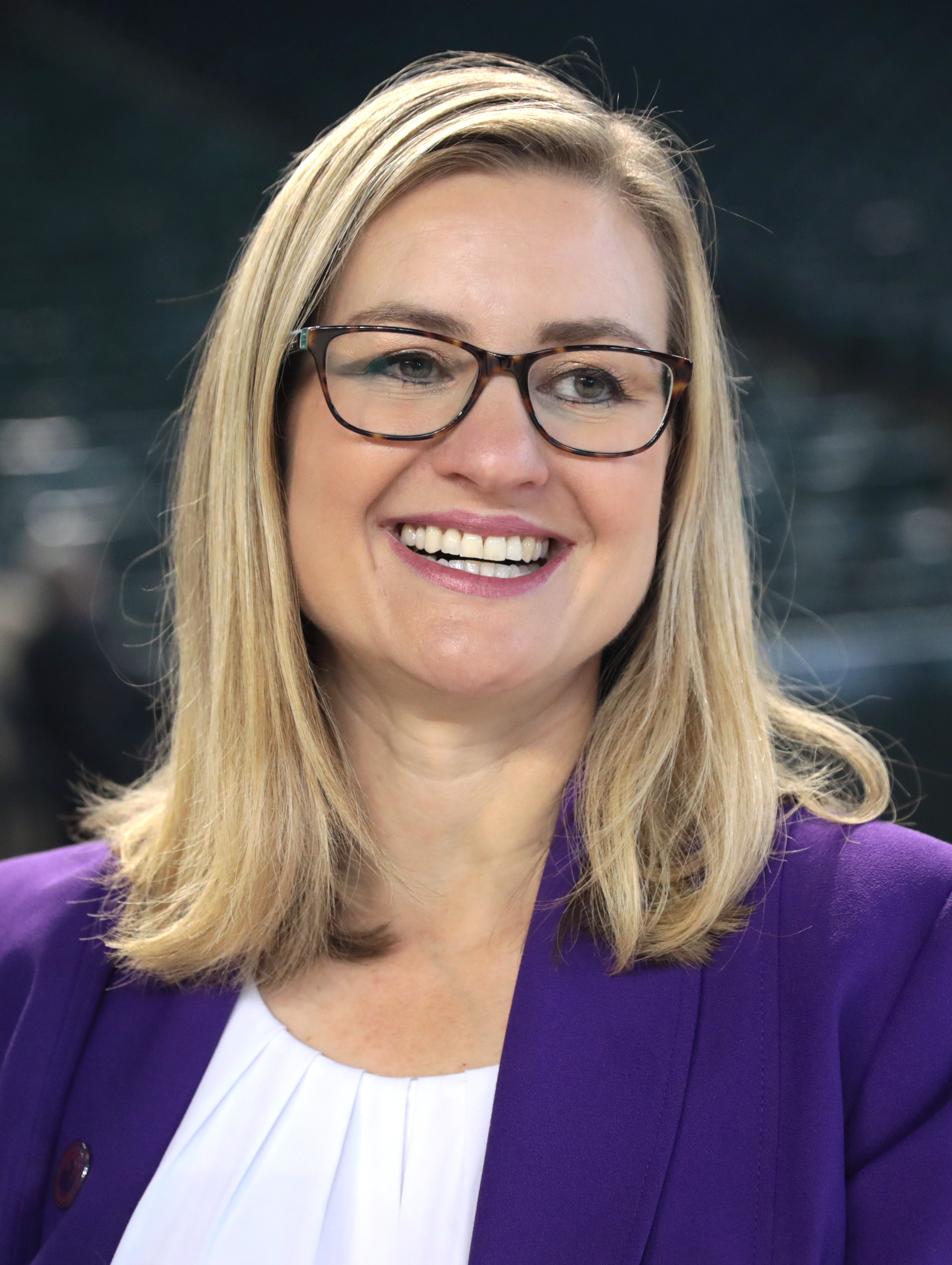
- Gallego in 2023

62nd Mayor of Phoenix
- Incumbent
- Assumed office March 21, 2019
- Preceded by: Thelda Williams (acting)

Member of the Phoenix City Council from the 8th district
- In office January 2, 2014 – August 7, 2018
- Preceded by: Michael Johnson
- Succeeded by: Felicita Mendoza

Personal details
- Born: Katharine Sarah Widland; October 21, 1981 (age 45) Albuquerque, New Mexico, U.S.
- Party: Democratic
- Spouse: Ruben Gallego (m. 2010; div. 2017)
- Children: 1
- Education: Harvard University (BA); University of Pennsylvania (MBA)
- Website: Campaign website

Katharine Sarah Widland Gallego (née Widland, born October 21, 1981) is an American politician serving as the 62nd mayor of Phoenix, Arizona, since 2019. A member of the Democratic Party, she previously served on the Phoenix City Council from 2014 to 2018.

== Early life and education ==
Born Katharine Sarah Widland, Gallego grew up in Albuquerque, New Mexico. Her parents are attorneys who moved to Albuquerque from Chicago after the 1979 Chicago blizzard. She grew up with asthma, which made air quality important to her. Gallego is Jewish. She celebrated her bat mitzvah in Albuquerque.

Gallego graduated from Albuquerque Academy, where she served as student body vice president. She earned a bachelor's degree in environmental science and public policy from Harvard College and a Master of Business Administration from the Wharton School of the University of Pennsylvania.

== Political career ==
External videos
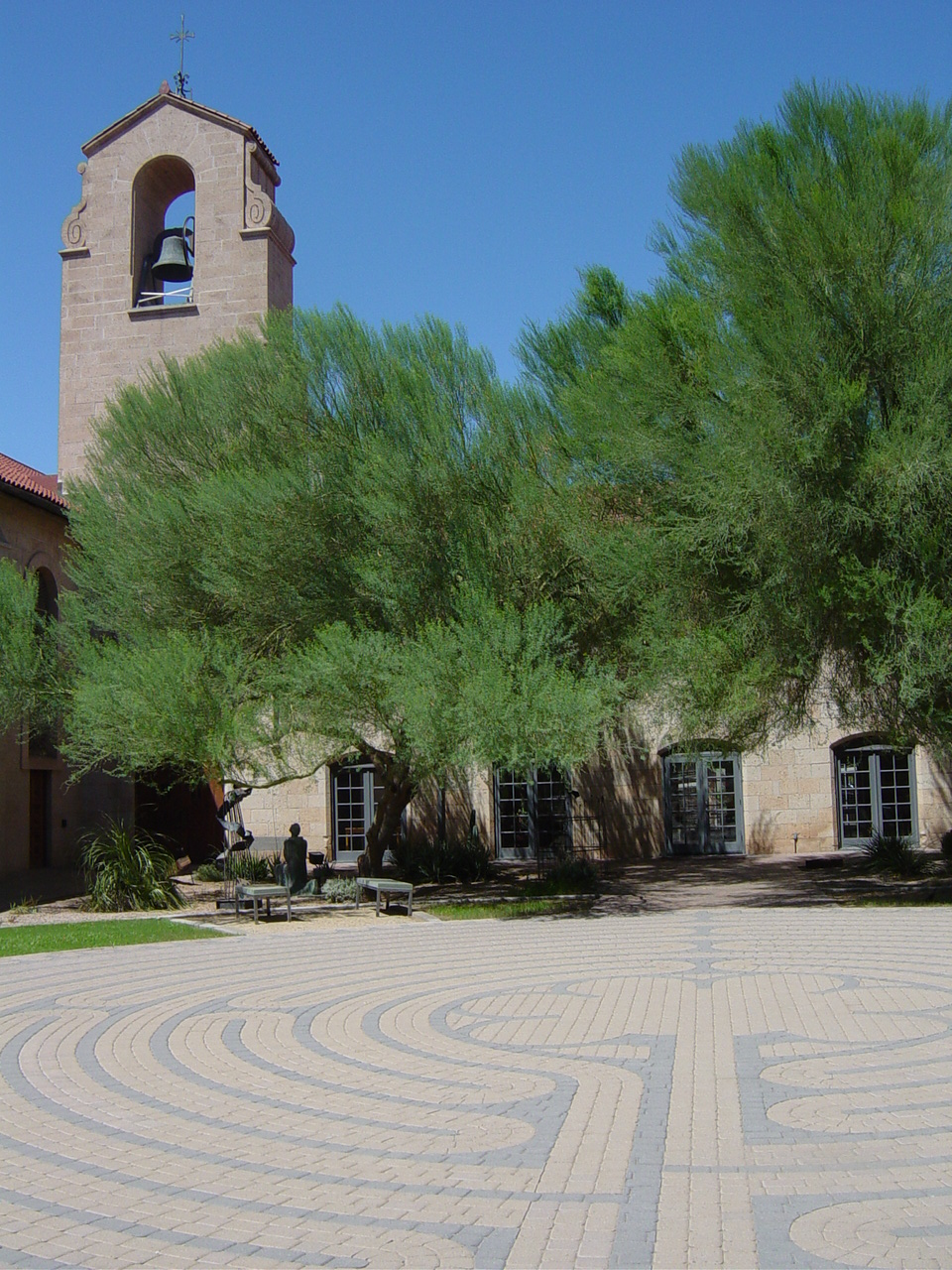
- “Rethinking cities in the face of extreme heat”, Kate Gallego and others, Knowable Magazine, 2022

Gallego worked for the Arizona Democratic Party, and the Arizona Office of Tourism, as well as on economic development and strategic planning for the Salt River Project. On November 5, 2013, Gallego was elected to the Phoenix City Council for the 8th district; she was reelected in 2017. With Greg Stanton, the Mayor of Phoenix, running for the United States House of Representatives in the 2018 elections, Gallego announced she would run in a special election to succeed him. She resigned from the city council effective August 7, 2018.

=== Elections ===
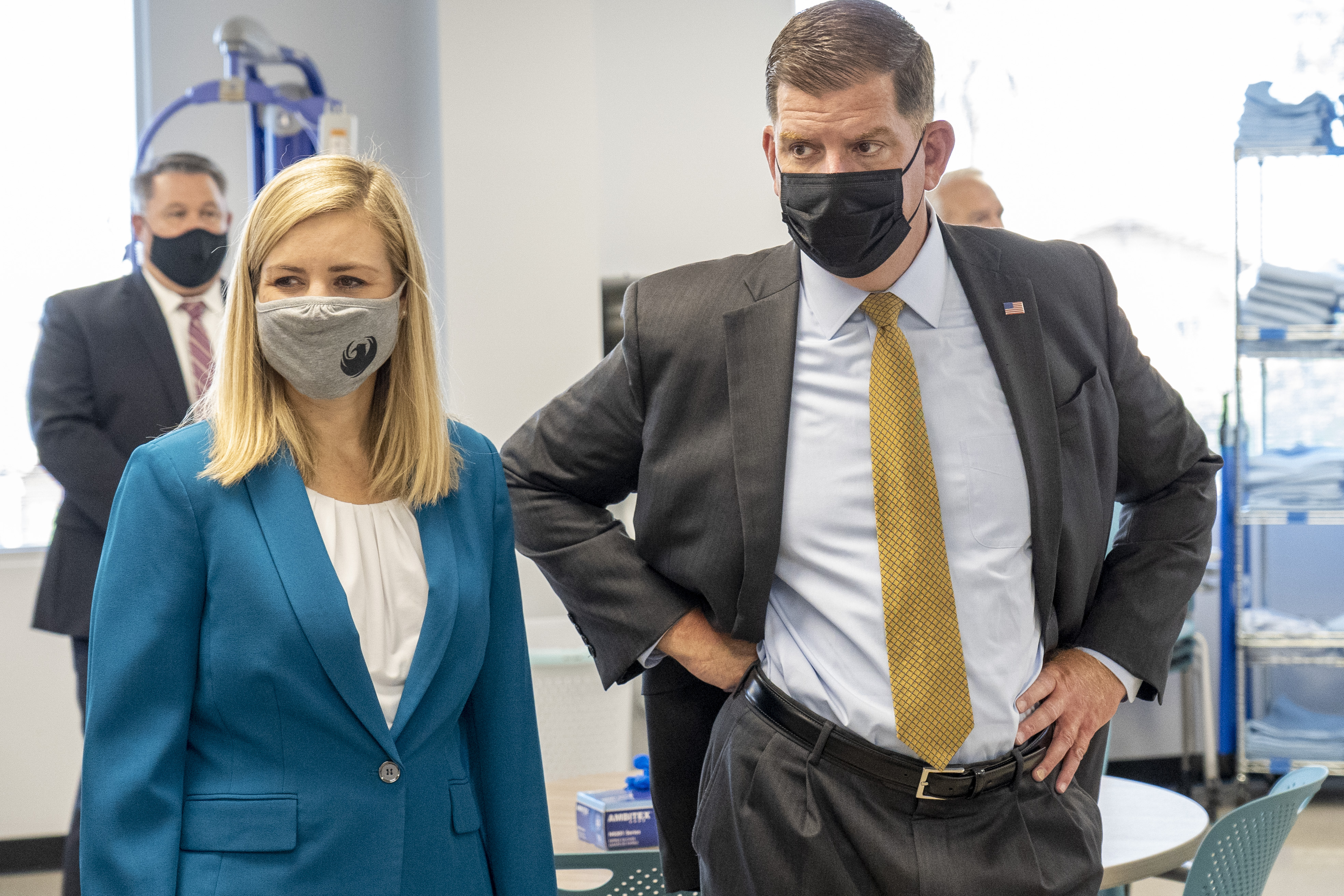
Gallego tours GateWay Community College with Secretary of Labor Marty Walsh

The city of Phoenix has nonpartisan mayoral elections. In the 2018 special election, Kate Gallego and Daniel Valenzuela advanced to a runoff in November 2018. They defeated Moses Sanchez and Nicholas Sarwark. Although the election was nonpartisan, both candidates were Democrats. Previously on the city council, they had voted similarly. Kate Gallego defeated Daniel Valenzuela in the special general runoff election for the mayor of Phoenix in 2019. She received 58.6% of votes. She assumed office on March 21, 2019. She is only the second female mayor in Phoenix history and one of the youngest big-city mayors in the United States. She was backed by progressives, labor unions, the Arizona Republic editorial board, and liberal advocacy organizations. Examples of these include Emily's List, Sierra Club, and the Planned Parenthood Advocates of Arizona.

In 2020, Kate Gallego ran for re-election. In November 2020, she was returned to office with the highest number of votes ever cast in a mayoral election. Merissa Hamilton, a Libertarian write-in candidate, was Gallego's closest opponent. Hamilton received 26.29% of votes. Gallego won the election, receiving 60.7% of the votes. In March 2024, Gallego announced her intention to run for re-election for another term. She won her third term against Republican Matt Evans.

=== Policing ===
The police department of Phoenix recorded shooting 44 people in 2018, spurring a reassessment from the community on police accountability. In 2020, Gallego suggested a plan for a citizens review board that would balance the police department interests and community interests. City councilman Carlos Garcia, who ran on further police accountability, created a plan focused on empowering a citizens review board from input of the community and groups such as Puente Human Rights and Poder in Action. The city council passed Garcia's model for a review board when Gallego and vice mayor Betty Guardados switched their votes from Gallego's model to the Garcia model with a 5–4 vote.

A Department of Justice investigation was initiated in August 2021 looking into if the police used excessive force on protestors and sweeping of homeless people and their property. The investigation planned to look at current police practices and its handling of the disabled.

=== Housing ===
Gallego supported legislation that legalized accessory dwelling units on lots that were previously strictly zoned for single-family housing.

=== Transportation ===
In January 2024, Gallego was appointed to the Transforming Transportation Advisory Committee, which will advise the U.S. Department of Transportation on ways to improve public transportation.

== Personal life ==
While attending Harvard, Kate Widland met Ruben Gallego at a charity auction following the September 11 attacks. They moved to Phoenix in 2004, and married in 2010. The couple announced their divorce in 2016, prior to the birth of their child. She endorsed Ruben's 2024 U.S. Senate candidacy.

== See also ==
- List of Harvard University politicians
- List of mayors of the 50 largest cities in the United States

Political offices
Preceded by Thelda Williams; Acting	Mayor of Phoenix; 2019–present	Incumbent
