= Simple Choices =

2013 book by Lisa Graham Keegan

Simple Choices: Thoughts on choosing environments that support who your child is meant to be
- Author: Lisa Graham Keegan
- Language: English
- Genre: Parenting, Memoir, Family Relations, Interpersonal Relations, Divorce, LGBT issues
- Publisher: Park Point Publishing
- Publication date: May 9, 2013 (Paperback)
- Publication place: United States
- Media type: Paperback (May 2013), Kindle Edition,
- Pages: 130 pages
- ISBN: 978-0-9887451-0-0

Simple Choices: Thoughts on choosing environments that support who your child is meant to be is a parenting book by Lisa Graham Keegan published in 2013.

Simple Choices begins with Keegan's memoir of building a family through divorce, abandonment, adoption, mental impairment, sexual identity and all the challenges life has to offer. Rather than weakening the family, Keegan shows how such trials can help build a stronger family bond. Gabriel Sanchez Zinny noted in the Huffington Post, "Keegan uses her biography to demonstrate the ways in which the education system doesn't provide children with the structure to realize their varied potential. To her, choice is the key for the system to provide quality education to everyone, regardless of gender, income or race." The book concludes with advice on how to nurture children to lead a life of service.

The forward to the book is written by Annie Graham and Kate Keegan McClendon, Keegan's daughter and stepdaughter, respectively. They articulate the sense of family and service that Keegan imbued in her extended family.

Keegan is a leading advocate of education reform in the United States. She is former Arizona Superintendent of Public Instruction, and an advisor on education policy to the White House, the United States Congress, and numerous governors and state policy makers.
