= 1956 United States presidential election in Arizona =

- November 6, 1956

All 4 Arizona votes to the Electoral College

| Nominee | Dwight D. Eisenhower | Adlai Stevenson |
| Party | Republican | Democratic |
| Home state | Pennsylvania (Note: Although he was born in Texas and grew up in Kansas before his military career, at the time of the 1952 election Eisenhower was president of Columbia University and was, officially, a resident of New York. During his first term as president, he moved his private residence to Gettysburg, Pennsylvania, and officially changed his residency to Pennsylvania.) | Illinois |
| Running mate | Richard Nixon | Estes Kefauver |
| Electoral vote | 4 | 0 |
| Popular vote | 176,990 | 112,880 |
| Percentage | 60.99% | 38.90% |

County results
Eisenhower
50–60%
60–70%
Stevenson
50–60%
60–70%
President before election
Dwight D. Eisenhower
Republican
Elected President
Dwight D. Eisenhower
Republican

The 1956 United States presidential election in Arizona took place on November 6, 1956, as part of the 1956 United States presidential election. States voters chose four representatives, or electors, to the Electoral College, who voted for president and vice president.

Arizona was won by incumbent President Dwight D. Eisenhower (R–Pennsylvania), running with Vice President Richard Nixon, with 60.99% of the popular vote, against Adlai Stevenson (D–Illinois), running with Senator Estes Kefauver, with 39.90% of the popular vote.

Eisenhower was the first Republican presidential candidate to ever carry Graham County, which was to become a Republican stronghold after 1964.

== Results ==
1956 United States presidential election in Arizona
| Party | Candidate | Votes | % |
|---|---|---|---|
| Republican | Dwight D. Eisenhower (inc.) | 176,990 | 60.99% |
| Democratic | Adlai Stevenson | 112,880 | 38.90% |
| Independent | T. Coleman Andrews | 303 | 0.10% |
| Majority | | 64,110 | 22.09% |
| Total votes | | 290,173 | 100.00% |

=== Results by county ===
| County | Dwight D. Eisenhower Republican | | Adlai Stevenson Democratic | | T. Coleman Andrews Independent | | Margin | | Total votes cast |
| County | # | % | # | % | # | % | # | % | Total votes cast |
|---|---|---|---|---|---|---|---|---|---|
| Apache | 1,685 | 63.18% | 981 | 36.78% | 1 | 0.04% | 704 | 26.40% | 2,667 |
| Cochise | 6,893 | 56.36% | 5,328 | 43.57% | 9 | 0.07% | 1,565 | 12.79% | 12,230 |
| Coconino | 4,044 | 63.50% | 2,314 | 36.33% | 11 | 0.17% | 1,730 | 27.17% | 6,369 |
| Gila | 4,234 | 51.26% | 4,026 | 48.74% | 0 | 0.00% | 208 | 2.52% | 8,260 |
| Graham | 2,384 | 58.55% | 1,688 | 41.45% | 0 | 0.00% | 696 | 17.10% | 4,072 |
| Greenlee | 1,784 | 39.69% | 2,711 | 60.31% | 0 | 0.00% | -927 | -20.62% | 4,495 |
| Maricopa | 92,140 | 62.96% | 54,010 | 36.91% | 191 | 0.13% | 38,130 | 26.05% | 146,341 |
| Mohave | 1,523 | 60.99% | 968 | 38.77% | 6 | 0.24% | 555 | 22.22% | 2,497 |
| Navajo | 3,928 | 65.80% | 2,033 | 34.05% | 9 | 0.15% | 1,895 | 31.75% | 5,970 |
| Pima | 39,298 | 62.49% | 23,536 | 37.43% | 51 | 0.08% | 15,762 | 25.06% | 62,885 |
| Pinal | 5,762 | 53.15% | 5,063 | 46.70% | 17 | 0.15% | 699 | 6.45% | 10,842 |
| Santa Cruz | 1,646 | 59.25% | 1,131 | 40.71% | 1 | 0.04% | 515 | 18.54% | 2,778 |
| Yavapai | 6,339 | 65.66% | 3,315 | 34.34% | 0 | 0.00% | 3,024 | 31.32% | 9,654 |
| Yuma | 5,330 | 47.96% | 5,776 | 51.98% | 7 | 0.06% | -446 | -4.02% | 11,113 |
| Totals | 176,990 | 60.99% | 112,880 | 38.90% | 303 | 0.10% | 64,110 | 22.09% | 290,173 |

==== Counties that flipped from Democratic to Republican ====
- Gila
- Graham

==== Counties that flipped from Republican to Democratic ====
- Yuma

== Electors ==
Electors were chosen by their party's voters in primary elections held on September 11, 1956. Andrews had no party affiliation and no slate of electors was pledged to him in Arizona.

| Adlai Stevenson & Estes Kefauver Democratic Party | Dwight D. Eisenhower & Richard Nixon Republican Party |
|---|---|
| Al J. Flood; Thomas J. Croaff; Arthur E. Parmer; A. J. Beaty | Andrew Baumert Jr.; James P. Boyle; Elsie Toles; C. B. Wilson |
