= Phoenix City Council =

Governing body of Phoenix, Arizona

Type
- Type: Unicameral

History
- Founded: 1948

Leadership
- Mayor: Kate Gallego (D) since March 2019
- Vice Mayor: Kesha Hodge Washington (D) since January 2025
- Transportation, Infrastructure and Planning (TIP) Subcommittee Chair: Debra Stark (D)
- Economic Development and Housing (EDH) Subcommittee Chair: Kevin Robinson, Independent
- Public Safety and Justice (PSJ) Subcommittee Chair: Ann O'Brien (R)
- Community Services and Education Subcommittee Chair: Kesha Hodge Washington (D)

Structure
- Seats: 9
- Political groups: 3 Officially nonpartisan: Democratic (6); Republican (2); Independent (1)

The Phoenix City Council is the governing body of the city of Phoenix, Arizona. The council is made up of nine members, including a mayor and eight councilors representing individual districts. While the mayor is elected in a citywide election, city councilors are elected by votes only in the districts they represent, with both the mayor and councilors serving four year terms.

The current mayor of Phoenix is Kate Gallego, a Democrat, who won the seat after defeating her former fellow-councilor, Daniel Valenzuela in a run-off election in March 2019. In setting city policy and passing rules and regulations, the mayor and city councilors each have equal voting power.

== History ==
Before 1948, the city of Phoenix was governed by commission. In 1948, the system was changed to a city council with a mayor selected in a run-off election in non-partisan elections. In 1982, the election system was changed so that councilors represented districts.

== Members ==
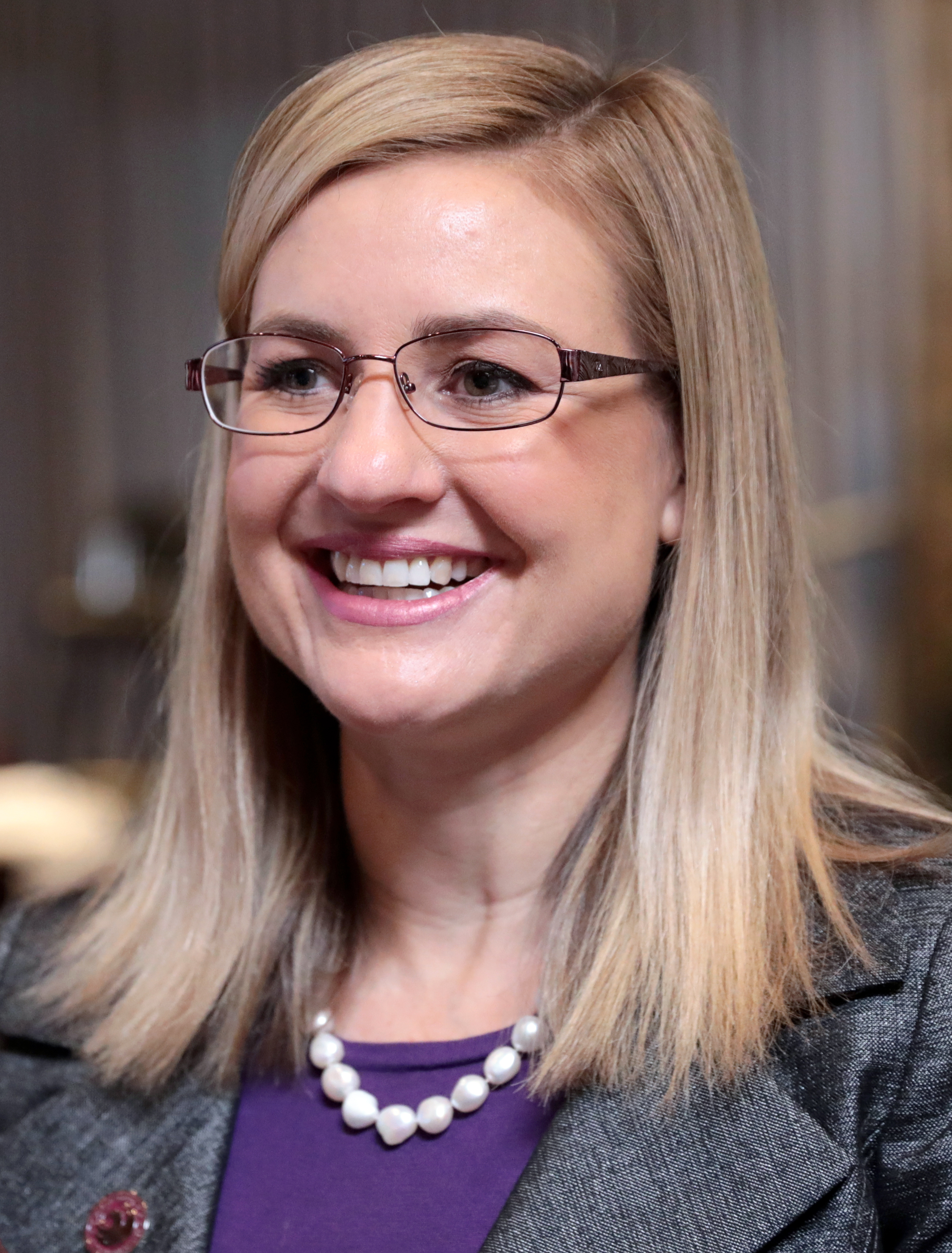
Mayor Kate Gallego

District map of the council, effective from 2024 (Interactive version)

District map of the council, effective from 2013 to 2024 (Interactive version)

District	Council Members	Party (officially nonpartisan)
Mayor	Kate Gallego	Democratic
District 1	Ann O'Brien	Republican
District 2	Jim Waring	Republican
District 3	Debra Stark	Democratic
District 4	Laura Pastor	Democratic
District 5	Betty Guardado	Democratic
District 6	Kevin Robinson	Independent
District 7	Anna Hernandez	Democratic
District 8	Kesha Hodge Washington	Democratic
