= C. Diane Bishop =

American politician (born 1943)

16th Arizona Superintendent of Public Instruction
- In office January 5, 1987 – January 2, 1995
- Governor: Evan Mecham; Rose Mofford; Fife Symington
- Preceded by: Carolyn Warner
- Succeeded by: Lisa Graham Keegan

Personal details
- Born: November 23, 1943 (age 82) Elmhurst, Illinois, U.S.
- Party: Democratic
- Profession: Politician

C. Diane Bishop (born November 23, 1943) is an American politician who served as the 16th Arizona Superintendent of Public Instruction from 1987 to 1995 as a Democrat.

== Early life ==
Bishop was born in Elmhurst, Illinois, on November 23, 1943.

== Career ==
Bishop served as Arizona's 16th Superintendent of Public Instruction from 1987 to 1995 as a Democrat, succeeding Carolyn Warner and preceding Lisa Graham Keegan.

Party political offices
Preceded by Carolyn Warner	16th Arizona Superintendent of Public Instruction; 1987–1995	Succeeded by Lisa Graham Keegan
