= Jaime Molera =

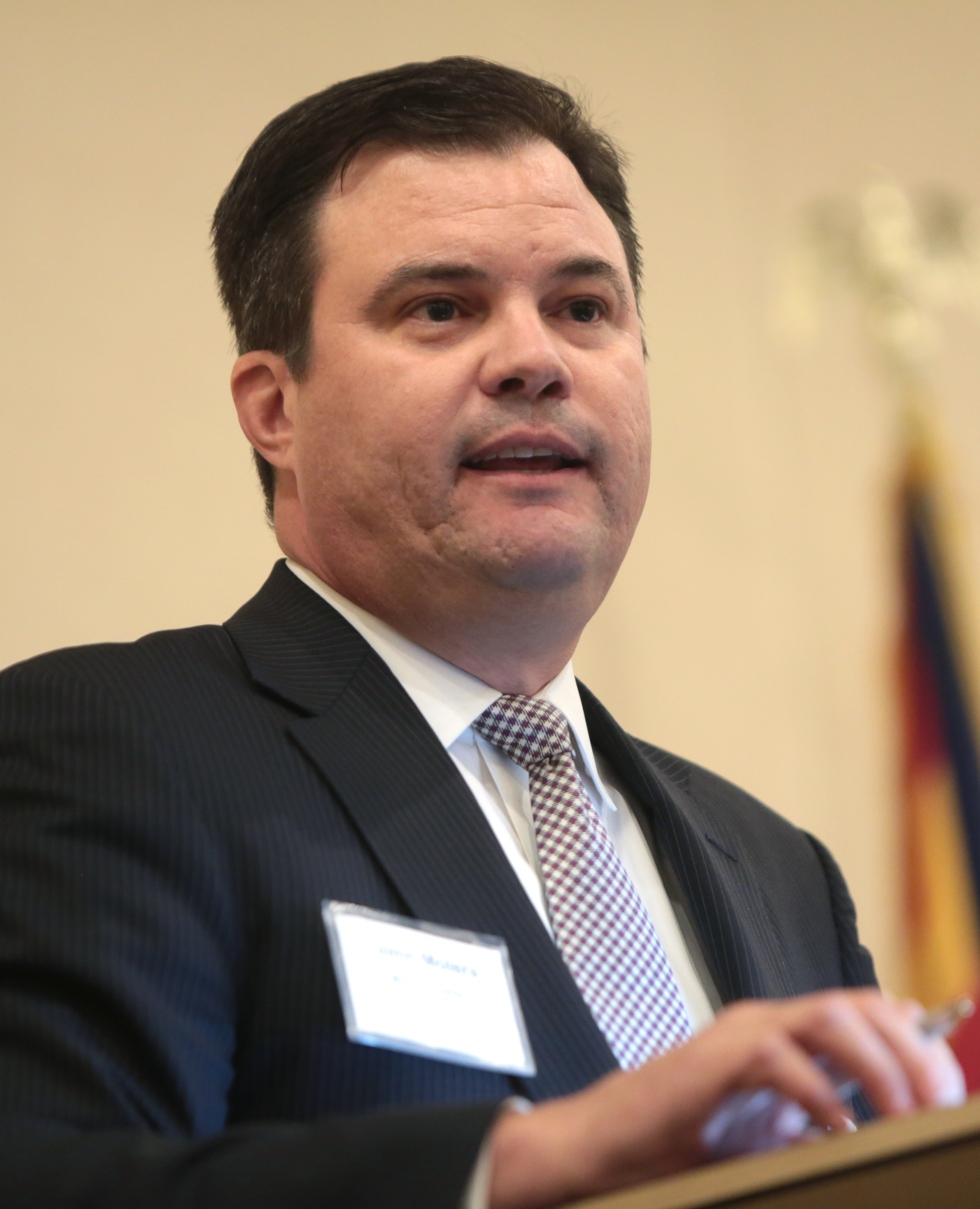

Arizona Superintendent of Public Instruction
- In office 2001–2003
- Governor: Jane Hull
- Preceded by: Lisa Graham Keegan
- Succeeded by: Tom Horne

Personal details
- Born: March 31, 1968 (age 56)
- Political party: Republican
- Education: Arizona State University

Jaime Molera (born March 31, 1968) is an American politician/businessman who served as the 18th Superintendent of Public Instruction for the state of Arizona, appointed by Governor Jane Hull to replace Lisa Graham Keegan, and served from 2001 to 2003.

Molera was born and raised in Nogales, Arizona and received his bachelor's degree in communications from Arizona State University.

He served as the education adviser and chief of policy for Governor Hull and as the director of policy for Lisa Keegan, his predecessor as Superintendent. Molera was defeated by Tom Horne in the 2002 Republican primary. Molera served as president of the Arizona State Board of Education under Governor Jan Brewer from 2011 until 2013. Molera now works as a partner with Molera Alvarez, LLC (a government relations/lobbying firm) and CoNecs, N.A. (a marketing/advertising company).
