= Elsie Toles =

American public official and author

Arizona Superintendent of Public Instruction
- In office 1921–1922
- Preceded by: Charles O. Case
- Succeeded by: Charles O. Case

Personal details
- Born: September 19, 1888 Bisbee, Arizona
- Died: August 29, 1957 (aged 68)
- Party: Republican Party (United States)

Elsie Toles (September 19, 1888 – August 29, 1957) was Arizona's first female Superintendent of Public Instruction, a professor, and an author. She was the first woman to hold this position and the first elected to statewide executive public office in Arizona.

== Biography ==
Elsie Toles was born on September 19, 1888, in Bisbee, Arizona. She was one of four girls in Bisbee High School's first graduating class. She attended Pomona College for a year before returning to Arizona upon her mother's death to care for her brother and sister. In 1908, she earned her teaching credentials from the State Normal School (now San Jose State University) in San Jose, California, and taught for two years in Bisbee before bringing her siblings with her for a year of specialized studies at the University of Michigan.

Toles returned to Arizona and taught in Bisbee and Douglas, Arizona. The Cochise County Republican Party approached her about running for the county superintendent of public instruction. She was the only Republican in the county to win that year, and held the post for two terms, starting in 1916. In the position, she managed 90 schools, many of which were rural. The many rural schools required extensive travel. She is credited with starting the county's school health services.

In 1920, Toles was elected as the state's Superintendent of Public Instruction, replacing incumbent Democrat Charles O. Case. She was the first woman elected to the position, and took office in 1921. The job also included managing the State Board of Pardons and Paroles. This election also made her the first woman elected to a statewide executive public office in Arizona. (The first women had been elected to the state legislature in 1914.)

Toles began a program raising teacher certification standards. She also increased financial aid for schools, particularly rural ones. Many of the recommendations she made were focused on the needs of rural schools. She believed that the most qualified county superintendents chose to work in cities for better pay and to avoid rural isolation, leaving the rural schools with less experienced ones. She believed the issue could be addressed by appointing superintendents and by reorganizing the educational structure. In 1922, 1200 schoolchildren in three counties were given a uniform educational and mental test in Arizona's first statewide test.

In the November 1922 election, she lost re-election her position to Charles O. Case in a "Democratic landslide" that replaced other elected Republicans in Arizona that year, such as the incumbent Governor Thomas Edward Campbell and the Republican majority in the State Senate. Case would be continually re-elected to this position until stepping down in early 1941. Toles then returned returned to the University of Michigan to complete her undergraduate degree and then completed a master's degree at the University of California, Berkeley. She taught as a demonstration teacher at the University of California demonstration school, and then became a professor of education at San Jose College, holding the position for seventeen years. Her focus remained on the supervision of rural schools.

During World War II, Toles helped establish childcare centers for California's war production plants. She retired in 1945 and moved in with her sister, Myriam, on their ranch in the Chiricahua Mountains. After retiring, she coauthored two children's books, Adventures in Apacheland and The Secret of Lonesome Valley, with her sister.

In the 1956 presidential election in Arizona, Toles was chosen as one of four Republican Party electors in a statewide primary vote, casting her electoral vote for Gen. Dwight Eisenhower in December of that year.

== Awards and honors ==
- 1984: Arizona Women's Hall of Fame
- 2016: Arizona Rural School's Association Hall of Fame
- 2021: Arizona Rural School's Association Hall of Fame established the Elsie Toles Woman in Rural Leadership Award
