= Lisa Graham Keegan =

American politician

Lisa Keegan
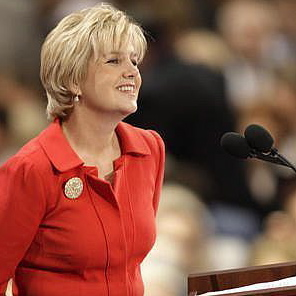

17th Arizona Superintendent of Public Instruction
- In office January 2, 1995 – May 2001
- Governor: Jane Dee Hull
- Preceded by: C. Diane Bishop
- Succeeded by: Jaime Molera

Personal details
- Born: July 20, 1959 (age 67) Palo Alto, California, U.S.
- Party: Republican
- Education: Stanford University (BA); Arizona State University, Tempe (MS)

Lisa Graham Keegan (born July 20, 1959) is an American education reform advocate and the author of the parenting book Simple Choices.

She is the principal partner of the Keegan Company, an education policy consulting firm and the executive director of "A for Arizona," an. organization promoting a "shift (of) efforts toward studying schools that, despite being low income, are certainly on the high end of success."

She served as Arizona Superintendent of Public Instruction and as a senior policy advisor on education to Senator John McCain's presidential campaigns in 2000 and 2008. At the 2008 National Republican Convention in St. Paul, Minnesota she was a vice chairman of the Republican Party political platform committee, for which she wrote policy statements on education issues.

Simple Choices begins with Lisa Graham Keegan's memoir of building a family through divorce, abandonment, adoption, mental impairment, sexual identity and all the challenges life has to offer. Rather than weakening the family, Keegan shows how these trials can help build a stronger family bond. The book concludes with advice on how to nurture children to lead a life of service.

Keegan has advocated for comprehensive education reform, including emphasis on standardized testing, school choice methods such as school vouchers, tuition tax credits, charter schools, and open enrollment. Political leaders for whom she has worked included several governors including Jeb Bush of Florida, Arnold Schwarzenegger of California, Jan Brewer and Doug Ducey of Arizona, and Chris Christie of New Jersey, and former Speaker of the House Newt Gingrich. After the 2014 election she was appointed as education co-chair of Arizona Governor-elect Doug Ducey's transition team.

== Author ==
Lisa Keegan is the author and co-author of numerous books and articles. Her book Simple Choices: Thoughts on choosing environments that support who your child is meant to be is a parenting book published in 2013. Simple Choices begins with Lisa Keegan's memoir of building a family through divorce, abandonment, adoption, mental impairment, sexual identity and all the challenges life has to offer. Rather than weakening the family, Keegan shows how these trials can help build a stronger family bond. The book concludes with advice on how to nurture children to lead a life of service. The forward to the book is written by Kate Keegan McClendon and Annie Graham, Keegan's step daughter and daughter respectively. They articulate the sense of family and service that Keegan imbued in her extended family.

Keegan has authored numerous articles on education for Hoover Institution's magazine Education Next and blog Liberating Learning, and other conservative groups including the Manhattan Institute and the Pioneer Institute, as well as the Arizona Republic. She co-authored the education chapter of Newt Gingrich's 2010 book To Save America: Stopping Obama's Secular-Socialist Machine. She has appeared as a speaker for think tanks, such as the Hoover Institute Board of Governors, Institute of Economic Affairs at the University of London, Empower America, Cato Institute, The Heritage Foundation, and the American Enterprise Institute. Columnists including George Will of Newsweek, David Brooks of the Weekly Standard, and Clint Bolick of National Review have featured Keegan's reform agenda.

== Education consultant and reform advocate ==
Lisa Graham Keegan is the principal partner of the Keegan Company, an education policy consulting firm. Since 2011 she has been a senior advisor to National School Choice Week.

Previously she has been associated with Education Breakthrough Network, a coalition of organizations and individuals for school choice; and the Education Equality Project with Joel I. Klein, former Chancellor, NYC Public Schools, Dr. Michael Lomax of the United Negro College Fund, Janet Murguia, CEO, National Council of La Raza (NCLR). The EEP asserts quality education is a civil right of all Americans.

Keegan has authored articles on education for Hoover Institution's magazine Education Next and blog Liberating Learning, and other conservative groups including the Manhattan Institute and the Pioneer Institute, as well as the Arizona Republic. She has appeared as a speaker to think tanks, such as the Hoover Institute Board of Governors, Institute of Economic Affairs at the University of London, Empower America, Cato Institute, The Heritage Foundation, and the American Enterprise Institute. Columnists such as George Will of Newsweek, David Brooks of the Weekly Standard, and Clint Bolick of National Review have featured Keegan's reform agenda.

Keegan is on the board of the Foundation for Advancing Alcohol Responsibility in Washington, D.C. Previously she served on Secretary's Commission on Opportunity in Athletics (Title IX), Empower America, Foundation for Teaching Economics, GreatSchools.net, Alliance for School Choice, and Children First America. She is the past-president of the school board of New Way Learning Academy, a school for special needs students. Keegan co-authored the education chapter of Newt Gingrich's 2010 book To Save America: Stopping Obama's Secular-Socialist Machine.In December 2011 it was announced that she would become the education policy advisor to Newt Gingrich's presidential campaign in early 2012.

In 2018 The Center for Education Reform recognized Lisa Graham Keegan for her unwavering commitment to providing students access to high-quality education with its Pioneer Award .

== McCain campaign ==
During John McCain's 2008 presidential campaign, Keegan served as senior policy advisor on education issues to Republican nominee John McCain as well as vice-presidential nominee Gov. Sarah Palin. She helped to write the campaign's education policies and often served as McCain's surrogate in debates, on panels, and on radio and television where these issues were discussed.

As a vice chairman of the 2008 Republican Party political platform committee, Keegan wrote national policy statements on behalf of the party. She was a prime-time speaker at the convention and was the principal spokesperson on education issues throughout McCain's campaign. She regularly debated a variety of political advisors to Senator Barack Obama's campaign on national media outlets such as Fox News and The NewsHour with Jim Lehrer on PBS.

== Professional background ==
Lisa Keegan was Arizona's Superintendent of Public Instruction from 1995 to 2001. Prior to becoming state superintendent, she served two terms in the Arizona House of Representatives from 1991 to 1995 where she was chair of the Education Committee. She was first elected as the Superintendent of Public Instruction in 1994 and reelected in 1998. This election marked first time in the history of the United States that all five of the top elected executive offices of a state were held by women: Jane Dee Hull, governor, Betsey Bayless, secretary of state, Janet Napolitano, attorney general, Carol Springer, treasurer, and Keegan, superintendent of public instruction.

As superintendent, she was the director of the Arizona Department of Education, the state education agency, and oversaw the state's charter school program.

A strong advocate for parental choice in education, as a legislator Keegan was the prime sponsor of one of the most comprehensive charter school law in the country. According to the Phoenix Business Journal, "As a result of her efforts... Arizona has become one of the fastest-growing charter states in the nation." Both as a legislator and Arizona's chief educational official, Keegan helped enact Arizona's Instrument to Measure Standards, which sets standards for math, reading, writing, and science students must meet for graduation. In response to criticism, Keegan took all phases of the test and posted her passing scores. She continued to resist, often unsuccessfully, political pressure to compromise the AIMS standards. Additionally, she helped the School Tuition Organization Tax Credit Bill become law. The bill created a tax-exempt funding source for funding of scholarships at private schools and enrichment programs at public schools. This law was the first time such a measure had been passed in the United States.

Governor Doug Ducey said of Arizona's educational successes as, "Arizona has always been very good on school choice.... I stood on the shoulders of giants like Lisa Graham Keegan .... [We] have 525 schools of choice in Arizona, charter schools, [which are] public schools with private management. If you take those schools, that's the No. 1 state in the nation for accomplishment on math, reading, and science."

Keegan served on Governor Jeb Bush's Restructuring Team for Florida Department of Education and on California Governor Arnold Schwarzenegger's Education Policy Transition Team. She was an education advisor to candidate George W. Bush and a member of the administration transition team, and one of two candidates interviewed by then President-elect George W. Bush to be Secretary of Education.

In 2001, Keegan became the chief executive officer of the Education Leaders Council (ELC), a non-profit, conservative education reform organization Keegan and other state school chiefs had founded in 1995. Under Keegan's leadership, ELC gained federal funding for its project, Following the Leaders, to implement the reform policies of the new federal education law. However, an investigation by the U.S. Department of Education initially suggested that ELC did not comply with federal regulations for the funds it was expending, and federal procurement standards. A final audit, however, showed that ELC's financial and administrative management had actually undercharged the Department of Education and outstanding grant funding was ultimately paid to the ELC and its spin-off organization, Following the Leaders by the Department of Education. Keegan's original three-year contract was extended to September 2004, after which she became an independent education and public policy consultant.

From 2001 to 2004, Keegan contributed to implementing education policies and programs which include the Elementary and Secondary Education Act, Following the Leaders School Implementation Program, American Board for Certification of Teacher Excellence, Washington DC School Choice Program. In 2003 she was a member of Education Secretary Rod Paige's Title IX Commission.

In 2006, Keegan became a consultant to Maricopa County, Arizona and eventually assistant county manager for community solutions and innovation. She left her job in May 2008 to join the McCain presidential campaign as education policy advisor. In 2020, she endorsed McCain's vice presidential opponent Joe Biden for president.

In 2022 Arizona Governor Doug Ducey named Keegan to "lead the ($100 million) AZ OnTrack Summer Camp ... initiative to overcome learning loss that occurred during the pandemic." She was appointed to be the "point person for the eight-week summer camp program, which will provide students with a positive, innovative atmosphere where they can get caught up."

== Personal background ==
Keegan has a bachelor's degree in linguistics from Stanford University (1981) and a master's degree in communication disorders from Arizona State University (1983). In 1998, she received the Friedman Foundation for Educational Choice Award for free enterprise innovation in education. She received the Athena Award from Athena International, and was named Education Leader of the Year by the national Republican Party in 1999. The Adam Smith Award for Economics Education was presented to her in 2000.

Keegan was inducted into the National Charter School Hall of Fame in 2013, in recognition of her service promoting parental choice in education. In 2011 the Arizona Chamber of Commerce and Industry recognized Keegan's efforts to reform education by presenting her with Milton Friedman Transformational Leader Award.

Keegan is a former senior warden in the Episcopal Church. In 1977, she won the title of National Champion by the International Arabian Horse Association. Keegan briefly served as the acting governor of Arizona in 1996 when Governor Jane Hull and other state officers were absent from the state. She is an advocate for marriage equality.

In 2009, Lisa Keegan was selected for the World Leadership Award by the Arizona council of the Girl Scouts of the USA. The award was to recognize her "contribution to the community and (her) testament to the Girl Scouts' code of honor." video interview

Lisa Keegan was elected president of the Grand Canyon Council of the Boy Scouts of America in 2019. The Grand Canyon Council provides character development programs for boys and girls through most of the state of Arizona. She is the first woman to preside over the council. In 2020 she was awarded the Silver Beaver Award for "distinguished service to youth."

Keegan is a mother of five adult children. She is married to John C. Keegan, a retired military officer and judge in Arizona.

Political offices
Preceded by C. Diane Bishop	Arizona Superintendent of Public Instruction; 1995–2001	Succeeded by Jaime Molera
