= Jim Waring =

American politician (born 1967)

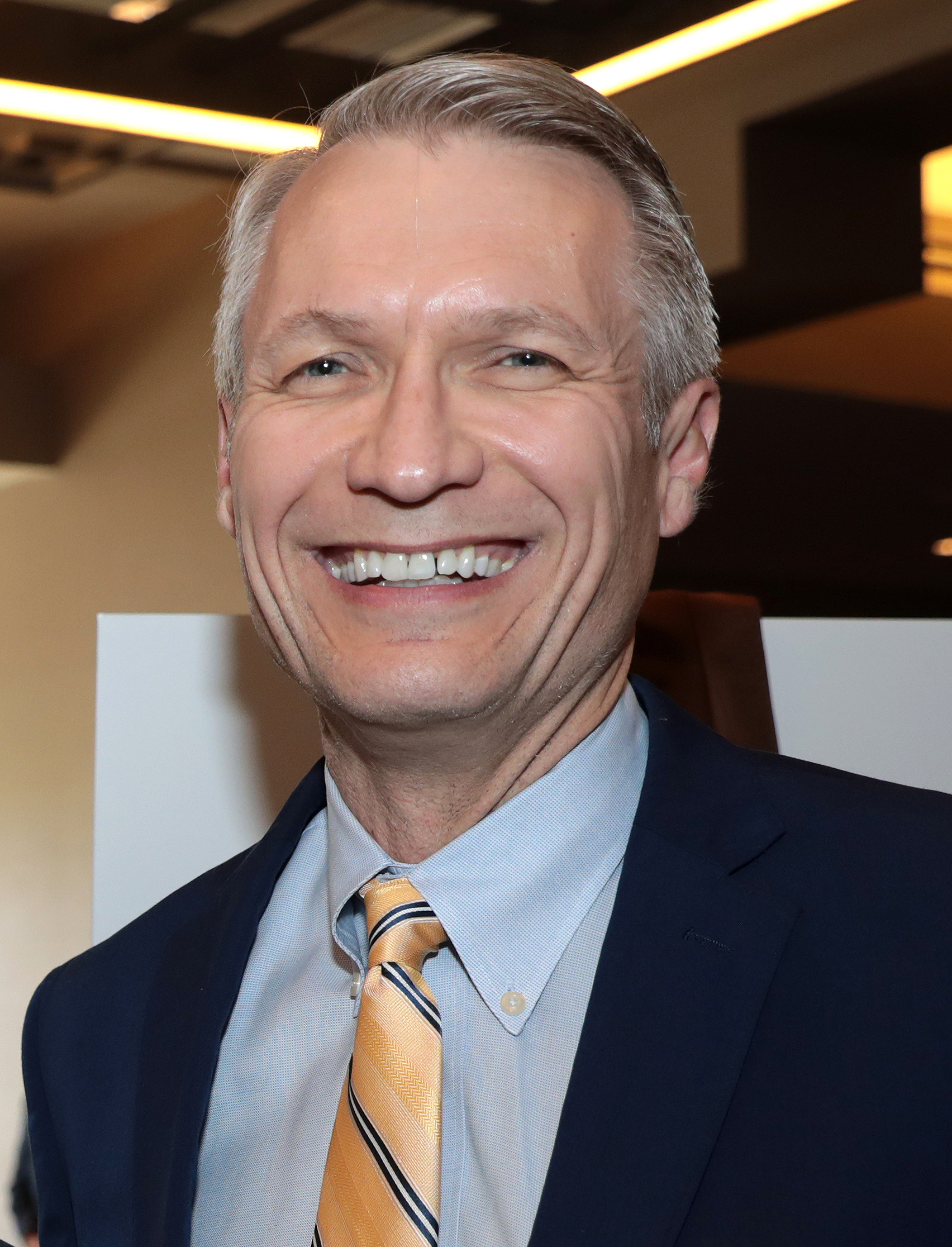
- Waring in 2019

Member of Phoenix City Council from the 2nd district
- Incumbent
- Assumed office September 7, 2011
- Preceded by: Bryan Jeffries

Member of the Arizona Senate from the 7th district
- In office January 2003 – February 2010
- Preceded by: ???
- Succeeded by: Ed Bunch

Personal details
- Born: December 27, 1967 (age 58) Downers Grove, Illinois, U.S.
- Party: Republican
- Spouse: Kitty Waring
- Children: 2
- Education: Northern Illinois University (BA); Arizona State University, Tempe (MA, MPA, PhD)
- Website: Campaign website Official website

Jim Waring (born 27 December 1967) is an American politician, who served as state senator for seven years in the Arizona State Senate and now represents District 2 on the Phoenix City Council.

A Republican, he represented State Legislative District 7, covering parts of Phoenix, Scottsdale, Cave Creek and Carefree. First elected in 2002, Waring was re-elected by large majorities in 2004, 2006 and 2008. He served as a delegate to the Republican National Convention in 2008, and ran for Congress in 2010.

== Early life and education ==
A native of Downers Grove, Illinois, he received his undergraduate degree from Northern Illinois University in DeKalb, Illinois, as well as a M.A. in Political Science, a Masters in Public Administration, and a PhD in Public Administration from Arizona State University, having written a dissertation on education finance. He was a member of the Pi Kappa Alpha fraternity.

== Political career ==
=== Arizona State Senate ===
During his time at the legislature, Waring was known for his work on veterans issues (selected American Legion Legislator of the Year, National Guard Association of Arizona Senator of the Year three times, presented the Copper Shield award by the Arizona Veterans Hall of Fame and awarded the Medal of Merit by the National Guard Association of the United States), his fiscal conservatism (selected Champion of the Taxpayer, Guardian of Small Business by NFIB and Arizona Chamber of Commerce and Industry Senator of the Year by the Arizona Chamber of Commerce and Industry) and efforts to protect victims of domestic violence. He was Chairman of the Senate Finance Committee, Chairman of the Senate Government Committee and Vice Chairman of the Senate Appropriations Committee.

=== Phoenix City Council ===
Councilman Jim Waring was sworn in as the District 2 Phoenix City Council representative on 7 Sept. 2011.

In 2023, he voted against legislation that legalized accessory dwelling units on lots that were previously strictly zoned for single-family housing.

=== Campaign for Congress 2010 ===
Following the announcement that John Shadegg would not stand for re-election in 2010, Waring resigned his State Senate seat to run for the U.S. House of Representatives in Arizona's 3rd congressional district. Waring lost in a 10-candidate Republican primary on 24 August to Ben Quayle, son of former Vice President Dan Quayle, by 4.5% or roughly 3,500 votes out of over 79,000 votes cast.

== Electoral history ==
=== Phoenix City Council, District 2 ===
2013 Election

Phoenix City Council, District 2 Election Results: 27 August 2013
| Candidate | Votes | Pct |
|---|---|---|
| Virgel Cain | 4,640 | 24% |
| Jim Waring | 14,690 | 76% |

*In order to avoid a runoff election, a candidate must receive a majority of the votes cast for the office, which is 50 percent of the votes, plus one. Based on the 27 August 2013 results, there was no need for a runoff election.

2011 Election

Phoenix City Council, District 2 Election Results: 30 August 2011
| Candidate | Votes | Pct |
|---|---|---|
| Bryan Jeffries | 8,864 | 38.83% |
| David Jones | 2,234 | 9.79% |
| Jim Waring | 11,732 | 51.39% |

*In order to avoid a runoff election, a candidate must receive a majority of the votes cast for the office, which is 50 percent of the votes, plus one. Based on the 30 August 2011 results, there was no need for a runoff election.

=== Congress, Arizona's 3rd Congressional District ===
2010 U.S. House, Arizona District 3 Primary Election

Congress, Arizona's 3rd Congressional District, Republican Primary Election Results: 24 August 2010
| Party | Candidate | Votes | Pct |
|---|---|---|---|
| REP | Bob Branch | 1,141 | 1.44% |
| REP | Sam Crump | 3,886 | 4.92% |
| REP | Pamela Gorman | 6,473 | 8.19% |
| REP | LeAnn Hull | 1,044 | 1.32% |
| REP | Steve Moak | 14,211 | 17.99% |
| REP | Paulina Morris | 6,138 | 7.77% |
| REP | Vernon Parker | 13,411 | 16.97% |
| REP | Ben Quayle | 17,400 | 22.02% |
| REP | Jim Waring | 13,850 | 17.53% |
| REP | Ed Winkler | 1,353 | 1.71% |
| REP | Write-In | 104 | 0.13% |

=== Arizona State Senate, District 7 ===
2008 Primary

Arizona State Senate, District 7, Republican Primary Election Results: 8 September 2008
| Party | Candidate | Votes | Pct |
|---|---|---|---|
| REP | Jim Waring | 12,584 | 99.16% |
| REP | Write-In | 106 | 0.84% |

2008 General

Arizona State Senate, District 7, General Election Results: 4 November 2008
| Party | Candidate | Votes | Pct |
|---|---|---|---|
| DEM | Lisa Black | 31,583 | 39.10% |
| LBT | Dennis Grenier | 2,465 | 3.05% |
| REP | Jim Waring | 46,673 | 57.78% |
| | Write-In | 52 | 0.06% |

2006 Primary

Arizona State Senate, District 7, Republican Primary Election Results: 12 September 2006
| Party | Candidate | Votes | Pct |
|---|---|---|---|
| REP | Jim Waring | 10,828 | 99.33% |
| REP | Write-In | 73 | 0.67% |

2006 General

Arizona State Senate, District 7, General Election Results: 7 November 2006
| Party | Candidate | Votes | Pct |
|---|---|---|---|
| DEM | Lisa Black | 23,860 | 42.87% |
| REP | Jim Waring | 31,735 | 57.02 |
| | Write-In | 64 | 0.11% |

2004 Primary

Arizona State Senate, District 7, Republican Primary Election Results: 7 September 2004
| Party | Candidate | Votes | Pct |
|---|---|---|---|
| REP | Jim Waring | 12,048 | 100.00% |

2004 General

Arizona State Senate, District 7, General Election Results: 7 November 2004
| Party | Candidate | Votes | Pct |
|---|---|---|---|
| DEM | John B. Vannucci | 22,814 | 32.99% |
| REP | Jim Waring | 46,335 | 67.01% |
| | Write-In | 64 | 0.11% |

2002 Primary

Arizona State Senate, District 7, Republican Primary Election Results: 10 September 2002
| Party | Candidate | Votes | Pct |
|---|---|---|---|
| REP | Wes Marsh | 3,034 | 30.34% |
| REP | David Burnell Smith | 3,048 | 30.48% |
| REP | Jim Waring | 3,918 | 39.18% |

2002 General

Arizona State Senate, District 7, General Election Results: 5 November 2002
| Party | Candidate | Votes | Pct |
|---|---|---|---|
| DEM | Jeff Bollerman | 14,801 | 36.63% |
| REP | Jim Waring | 28,326 | 65.68% |

== Personal life ==
Jim and his wife, Kitty, are the parents of twin boys.
