= Arizona Superintendent of Public Instruction =

Elected official

Superintendent of Public Instruction of Arizona
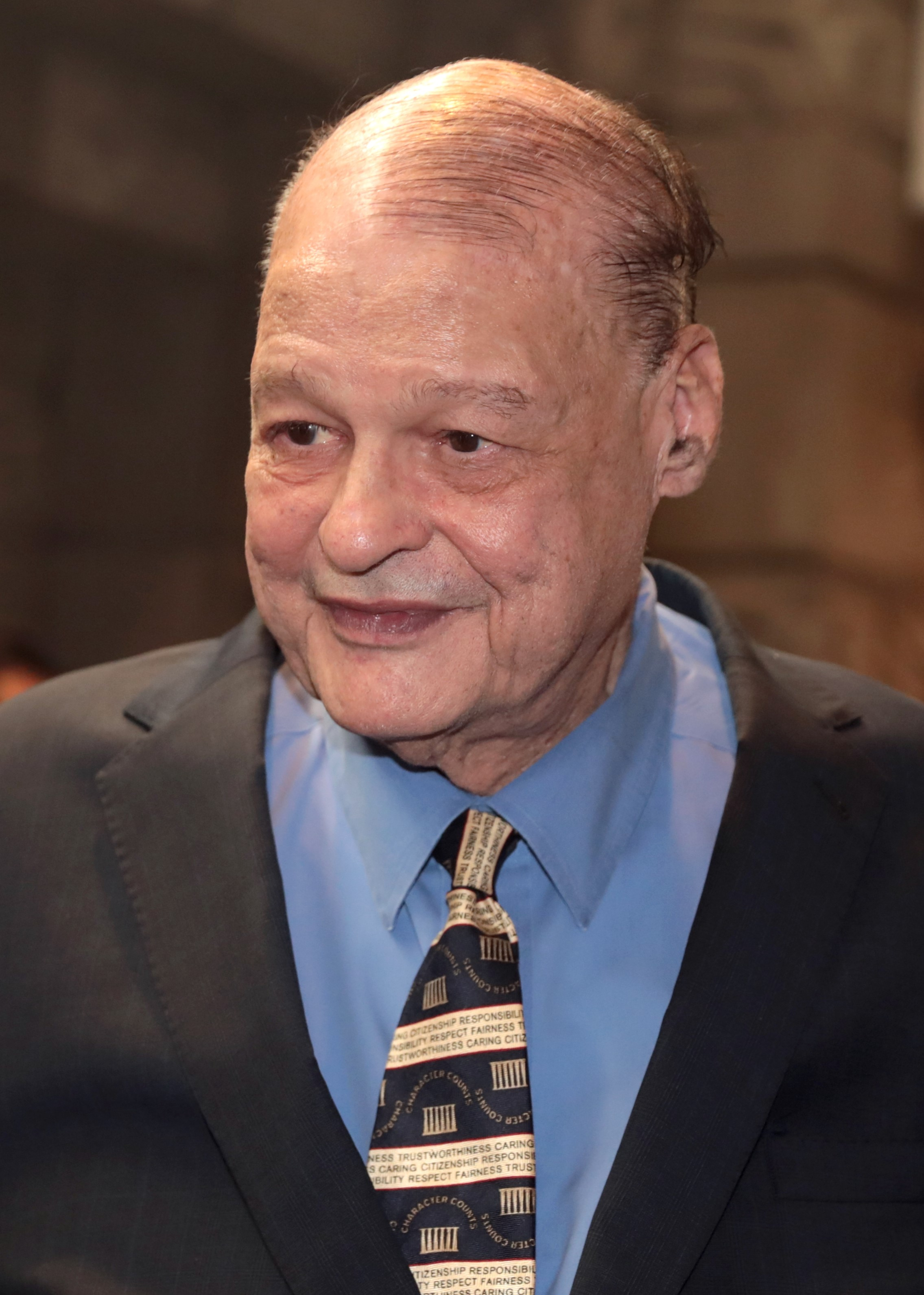
- Incumbent; Tom Horne since January 2, 2023
- Residence: Phoenix, Arizona
- Term length: Four years, can serve two terms
- Succession: Fourth
- Website: State Website

The Arizona Superintendent of Public Instruction is an elected state executive position in the Arizona state government. The superintendent oversees the state of Arizona's public school system and directs the state's Department of Education.

The state superintendent's powers are mostly administrative, with little influence over education policy. While the superintendent oversees teacher certification and administers state policy, other officials and boards exert control over most substantive aspects of education in the state. For example, school funding formulas and appropriations are set by law (as determined by the Arizona Legislature and governor of Arizona, or by voters in ballot questions). The State Board of Education sets curricular and academic standards. The superintendent serves ex officio as one member of the State Board of Education and State Board for Charter Schools, but the other board members are appointed by the governor to staggered terms. Thus, the extent of the state superintendent's influence over state education policy largely depends on their ability to persuade the governor, the state boards, and the Legislature.

As of 2017, Arizona's Superintendent of Public Instruction is the lowest paid state education administrator in the United States, being paid $85,000 compared to the national average of $174,000.

The current superintendent is Tom Horne.

The Superintendent of Public Instruction is fourth (behind the Secretary of State, Attorney General, and Treasurer, respectively) in the line of succession to the office of Governor of Arizona.

The Superintendent of Public Education is an ex officio member of the Arizona Board of Regents which oversees public universities in the state.

== Superintendents ==
#	Name	Political Party	Term of Office
1	Charles O. Case	Democratic	1912–1921
2	Elsie Toles	Republican	1921–1923
3	Charles O. Case	Democratic	1933–1941
4	Herman E. Hendrix	Democratic	1933–1941
5	E. D. Ring	Democratic	1941–1947
6	N. D. Pulliam	Democratic	1947–1947
7	L. D. Klemraedson	Democratic	1947–1949
8	M. L. Brooks	Democratic	1949–1955
9	C. L. "Cliff" Harkins	Democratic	1955–1957
10	M. L. Brooks	Democratic	1957–1959
11	C. L. "Cliff" Harkins	Democratic	1955–1959
12	W. W. "Skipper" Dick	Democratic	1959–1967
13	Sarah Folsum	Republican	1967–1971
14	Weldon P. Shofstall	Republican	1971–1975
15	Carolyn Warner	Democratic	1975–1987
16	C. Diane Bishop	Democratic	1987–1995
17	Lisa Graham Keegan	Republican	1995–2001
18	Jaime Molera	Republican	2001–2003
19	Tom Horne	Republican	2003–2011
20	John Huppenthal	Republican	2011–2015
21	Diane Douglas	Republican	2015–2019
22	Kathy Hoffman	Democratic	2019–2023
23	Tom Horne	Republican	2023–present
