= Charles Lucking =

American politician

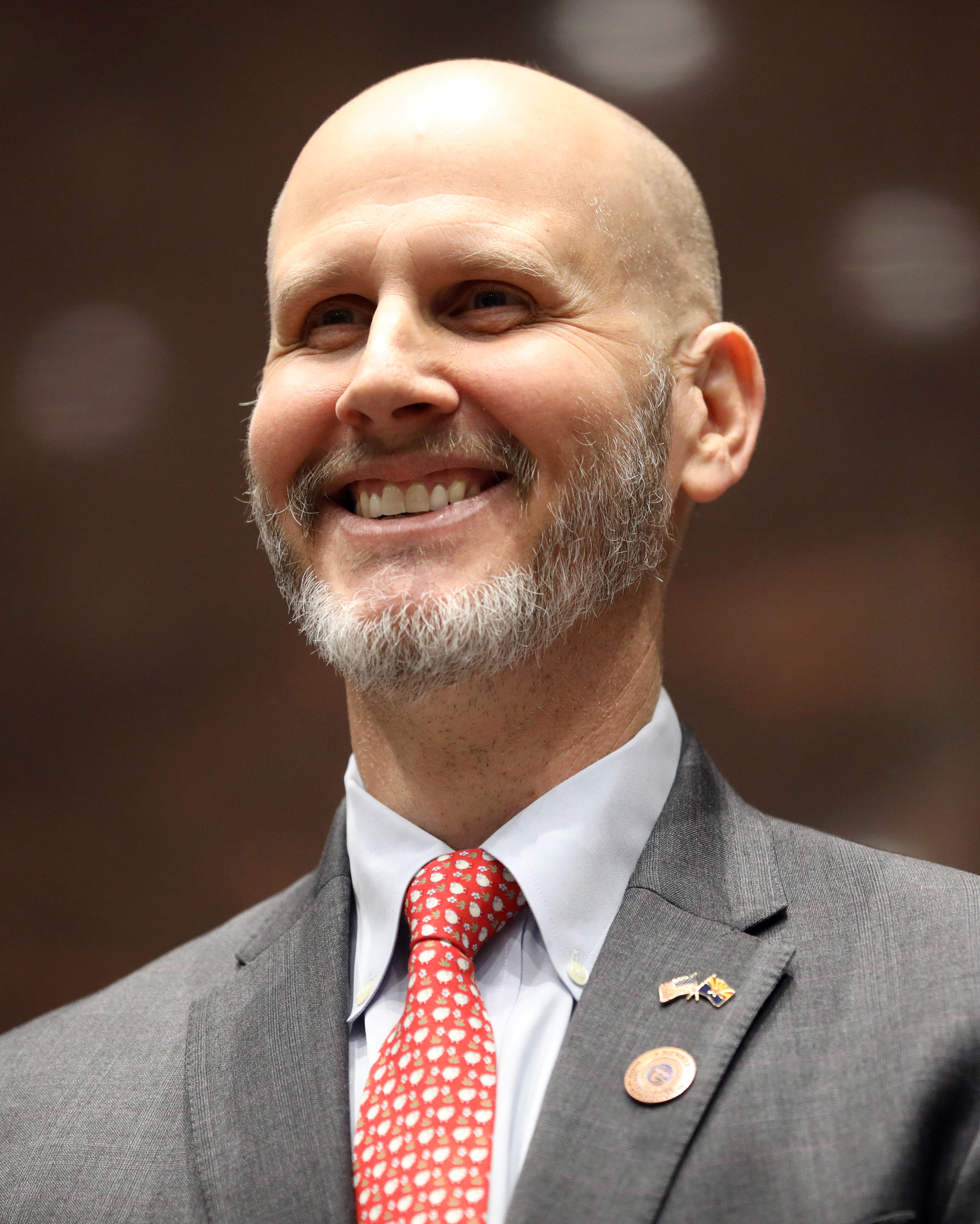

Member of the Arizona House of Representatives from the 5th district
- In office February 15, 2024 – January 13, 2025 Serving with Sarah Liguori
- Preceded by: Amish Shah
- Succeeded by: Aaron Márquez

Personal details
- Born: Phoenix, Arizona, U.S.
- Party: Democratic
- Education: Claremont McKenna College; Arizona State University (JD)

Charles Lucking is an American attorney and politician who served as a member for the Arizona House of Representatives for the 5th district. On February 15, 2024, he was sworn in to the position after being appointed by the Maricopa County Board of Supervisors, replacing incumbent Representative Amish Shah, who resigned from the position.

== Early life and education ==
Lucking is a fifth generation Arizonan, and was born and raised in Phoenix. He graduated from Central High School, and attended Claremont McKenna College and Arizona State University, the latter of which he received his Juris Doctor degree in Contract, Tax and Real Property.

== Career ==
Prior to entering politics, Lucking served in the Peace Corps, where he met his wife, Skye Lucking. Later, he worked for the nonprofit law firm Community Legal Services, which focuses on housing issues. In his role at the firm, Lucking defended tenants facing eviction.

On February 14, 2024, Lucking was selected to be appointed to the Arizona House of Representatives to replace former State Representative Amish Shah who resigned in order to focus on his congressional run. Lucking was selected by the Maricopa County Board of Supervisors, against fellow candidates Brianna Westbrook and Mark Robert Gordon. He was sworn in on February 15, 2024. He lost reelection in the Democratic primary in 2024.
