= Kelly Cooper =

Kelly Cooper may refer to:

- Kelly Cooper, Canadian short story writer, runner-up at the Danuta Gleed Literary Award
- Kelly Cooper, fictional police constable in HolbyBlue
- Kelly Cooper, Republican candidate in 2024 United States House of Representatives elections in Arizona#District 4
