= 2024 United States House of Representatives elections in Arizona =

- November 5, 2024

All 9 Arizona seats to the United States House of Representatives
	Majority party	Minority party
Party	Republican	Democratic
Last election	6	3
Seats won	6	3
Seat change	Steady	Steady
Popular vote	1,680,841	1,551,085
Percentage	51.66%	47.67%
Swing	▼4.48%	▲5.11%

Republican
40–50%
50–60%
60–70%
70–80%
Democratic
50–60%
60–70%
70–80%

The 2024 United States House of Representatives elections in Arizona were held on November 5, 2024, to elect the nine U.S. representatives from the State of Arizona, one from each of the state's nine congressional districts. The elections coincided with the 2024 U.S. presidential election, other elections to the House of Representatives, elections to the United States Senate, and various state and local elections. The primary elections took place on July 30, 2024.

== Overview ==
=== Statewide ===
Party	Candi- dates	Votes		Seats		
Party	Candi- dates	No.	%	No.	+/–	%
Republican Party	9	1,680,841	51.66%	6	Steady	66.67%
Democratic Party	9	1,551,085	47.67%	3	Steady	33.33%
Green Party	3	21,832	0.67%	0	Steady	0.0%
Write-ins	5	162	0.00%	0	Steady	0.0%
Total	20	3,253,920	100%	9	Steady	100%

=== District ===
District	Republican		Democratic		Others		Total		Result
District	Votes	%	Votes	%	Votes	%	Votes	%	Result
District 1	225,538	51.91%	208,966	48.09%	0	0.00%	434,504	100.00%	Republican hold
District 2	221,413	54.48%	184,963	45.51%	55	0.01%	406,431	100.00%	Republican hold
District 3	53,705	26.58%	143,336	70.94%	5,024	2.49%	202,065	100.00%	Democratic hold
District 4	152,052	45.45%	176,428	52.74%	6,065	1.81%	334,545	100.00%	Democratic hold
District 5	255,628	60.39%	167,680	39.61%	0	0.00%	423,308	100.00%	Republican hold
District 6	215,596	50.00%	204,774	47.49%	10,850	2.52%	431,220	100.00%	Republican hold
District 7	99,057	36.55%	171,954	63.45%	0	0.00%	271,011	100.00%	Democratic hold
District 8	208,269	56.50%	160,344	43.50%	0	0.00%	368,613	100.00%	Republican hold
District 9	249,583	65.30%	132,640	34.70%	0	0.00%	382,223	100.00%	Republican hold
Total	1,680,841	51.66%	1,551,085	47.67%	21,994	0.68%	3,253,920	100.00%	

Popular vote
Republican	51.66%
Democratic	47.67%
Other	0.68%

House seats
Republican	66.67%
Democratic	33.33%

=== County ===
County	Republican		Democratic		Others		Margin		Total
County	#	%	#	%	#	%	#	%	Total
Apache	9,792	30.79%	22,012	69.20%	3	0.01%	-12,220	-38.42%	31,807
Cochise	34,577	60.02%	21,526	37.37%	1,504	2.61%	13,051	22.66%	57,607
Coconino	24,602	35.93%	43,868	64.06%	10	0.01%	-19,266	-28.13%	68,480
Gila	17,584	66.14%	8,994	33.83%	7	0.03%	8,590	32.31%	26,585
Graham	10,635	71.47%	3,910	26.28%	336	2.26%	6,725	45.19%	14,881
Greenlee	2,110	65.77%	992	30.92%	106	3.30%	1,118	34.85%	3,208
La Paz	5,260	71.81%	2,065	28.19%	0	0.00%	3,195	43.62%	7,325
Maricopa	993,902	50.85%	949,745	48.59%	11,089	0.57%	44,157	2.26%	1,954,736
Mohave	82,459	78.02%	23,226	21.98%	0	0.00%	59,233	56.05%	105,685
Navajo	26,635	53.37%	23,273	46.63%	2	0.00%	3,362	6.74%	49,910
Pima	209,966	41.94%	282,627	56.46%	8,020	1.60%	-72,661	-14.51%	500,613
Pinal	122,845	60.48%	79,367	39.08%	891	0.44%	43,478	21.41%	203,103
Santa Cruz	6,793	36.25%	11,946	63.75%	0	0.00%	-5,153	-27.50%	18,739
Yavapai	95,608	65.61%	50,095	34.38%	26	0.02%	45,513	31.23%	145,729
Yuma	38,073	58.12%	27,439	41.88%	0	0.00%	10,634	16.23%	65,512
Totals	1,680,841	51.66%	1,551,085	47.67%	21,994	0.68%	129,756	3.99%	3,253,920

== District 1 ==
2024 Arizona's 1st congressional district election
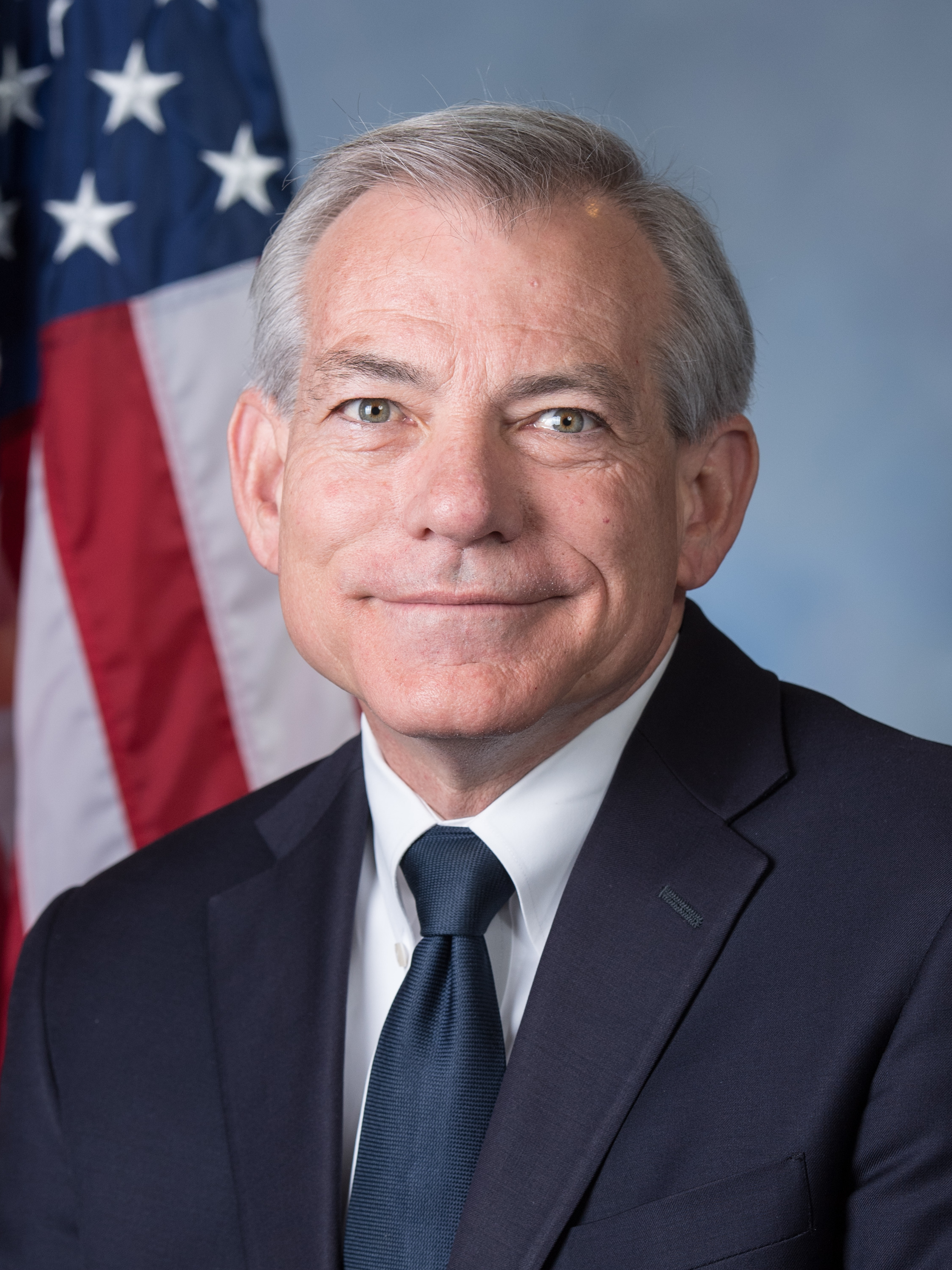

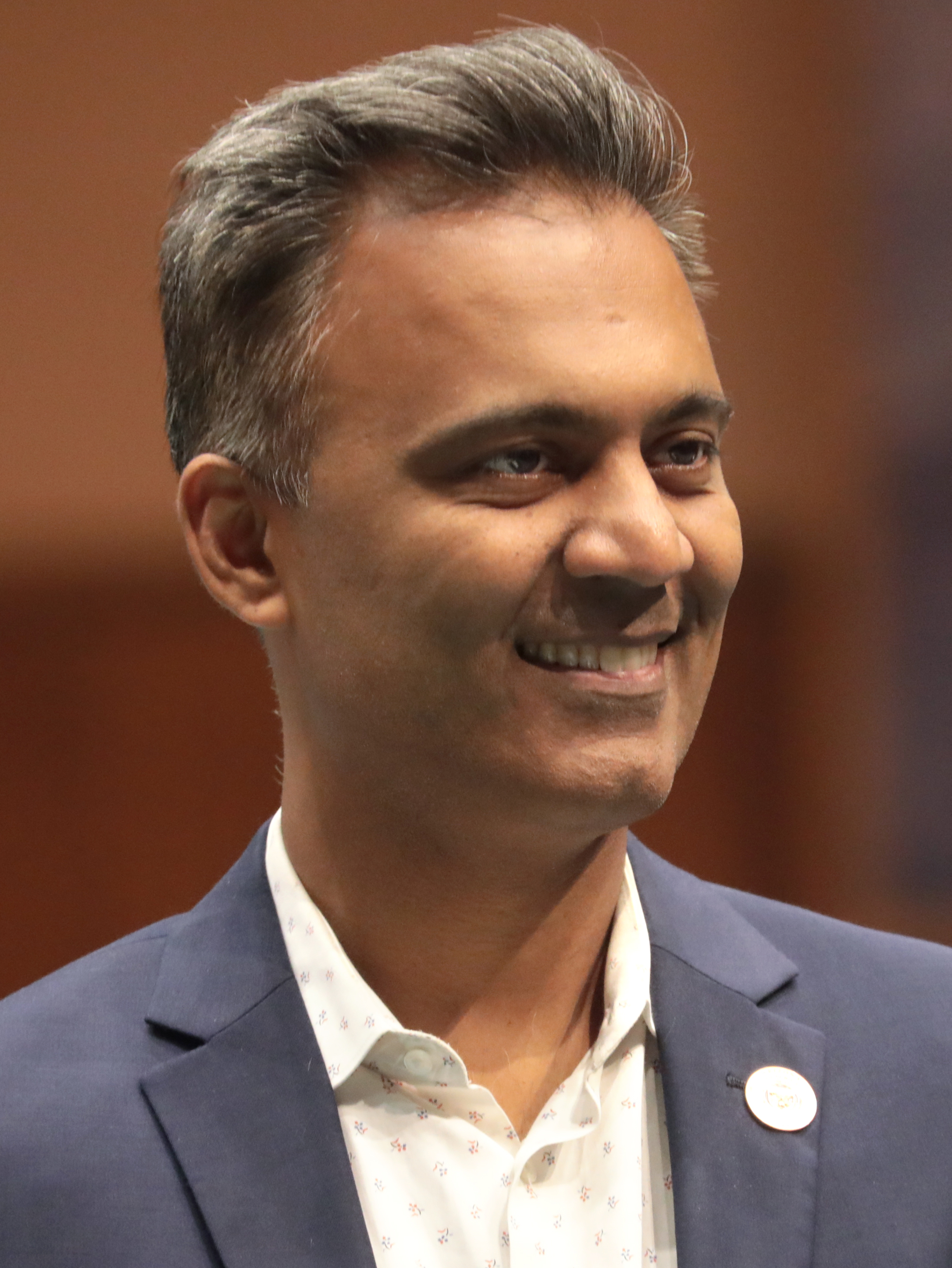
Nominee	David Schweikert	Amish Shah
Party	Republican	Democratic
Popular vote	225,538	208,966
Percentage	51.91%	48.09%
- Schweikert: 40–50% 50–60% 60–70% 70–80% >90% Shah: 50–60% 60–70% 70–80% No votes
U.S. Representative before election
David Schweikert
Republican
Elected U.S. Representative
David Schweikert
Republican

The 1st district is based in northeastern Phoenix and Scottsdale. The incumbent was Republican David Schweikert, who was re-elected with 50.4% of the vote in 2022.

=== Republican primary ===
==== Nominee ====
- David Schweikert, incumbent U.S. representative

==== Eliminated in primary ====
- Robert Backie, medical company sales director
- Kim George, global security operations investigator

==== Endorsements ====
David Schweikert

Organizations

- AIPAC
- Americans for Prosperity
- ClearPath Action Fund
- The LIBRE Initiative
- Republican Jewish Coalition

==== Fundraising ====
Campaign finance reports as of September 30, 2024
Candidate	Raised	Spent	Cash on hand
David Schweikert (R)	$3,580,353	$2,889,975	$743,314
Source: Federal Election Commission

==== Debates ====
2024 Arizona's 1st congressional district Republican primary debates
No.	Date	Host	Moderator	Link	Republican	Republican	Republican
Key: P Participant A Absent N Not invited I Invited W Withdrawn							
Key: P Participant A Absent N Not invited I Invited W Withdrawn					Robert Blackie	Kim George	David Schweikert
1	May 21, 2024	Arizona PBS	Ted Simons	YouTube	P	P	A
2	Jun. 4, 2024	The Arizona Citizens Clean Elections Commission; Arizona Media Association	Steve Goldstein	YouTube	P	P	A

==== Results ====
Republican primary results
Party	Candidate	Votes	%
Republican	David Schweikert (incumbent)	62,811	62.7
Republican	Kim George	27,587	27.5
Republican	Robert Blackie	9,854	9.8
Total votes		100,252	100.0

=== Democratic primary ===
==== Nominee ====
- Amish Shah, former state representative from the 5th district (2019–2024)

==== Eliminated in primary ====
- Andrei Cherny, former chair of the Arizona Democratic Party (2011–2012), nominee for Arizona state treasurer in 2010, and candidate for the 9th district in 2012
- Marlene Galán-Woods, former KSAZ-TV news anchor and widow of former Republican Arizona Attorney General Grant Woods
- Andrew Horne, orthodontist
- Kurt Kroemer, former CEO of the Arizona Red Cross
- Conor O'Callaghan, global trading executive

==== Declined ====
- Jevin Hodge, former state representative from the 8th district (2024) and nominee for this district in 2022
- Hiral Tipirneni, emergency room physician, nominee for this district (Note: This district was numbered as the 6th district prior to the 2020 redistricting cycle.) in 2020, and nominee for the 8th district in the 2018 special and general elections

==== Endorsements ====
Andrei Cherny

U.S. executive officials

- Bill Clinton, 42nd president of the United States (1993–2001)

U.S representatives

- Seth Moulton, U.S. representative from Massachusetts's 6th congressional district (2015–present)

Local officials

- Kate Gallego, mayor of Phoenix

Organizations

- Brady PAC
- League of Conservation Voters
- VoteVets
Marlene Galán-Woods

Federal cabinet officials

- Janet Napolitano, former U.S. secretary of Homeland Security (2009–2013) and former governor of Arizona (2003–2009)

U.S. representatives

- Lois Frankel, U.S. representative from Florida's 22nd congressional district (2013–present)
- Linda Sánchez, U.S. representative from California's 38th congressional district (2003–present)

Labor unions

- Arizona AFL-CIO
- National Education Association

Organizations

- Congressional Hispanic Caucus BOLD PAC
- EMILY's List
- Latino Victory Fund
- National Women's Political Caucus
- PODER PAC
Andrew Horne

Organizations

- Vote Common Good (co-endorsement with Kroemer)
Kurt Kroemer

Organizations

- Vote Common Good (co-endorsement with Horne)
Conor O'Callaghan

U.S. representatives

- Brendan Boyle, U.S. representative from Pennsylvania's 2nd congressional district (2019–present)
- Dan Goldman, U.S. representative from New York's 10th congressional district (2023–present)
- Val Hoyle, U.S. representative from Oregon's 4th congressional district (2023–present)
- Adam Kinzinger, former U.S. representative from Illinois's 16th congressional district (2011–2023) (Republican)
- Max Rose, former U.S. representative from New York's 11th congressional district (2019–2021)

Organizations

- Blue America
- Patriotic Millionaires
- Stonewall Democrats of Arizona

Individuals

- Howie Klein, former president of Reprise Records (1989–2001) and adjunct professor at McGill University
- Heather Digby Parton, political blogger
Amish Shah

Organizations

- AAPI Victory Fund
- Asian American Action Fund
- ASPIRE PAC
- Democratic Majority for Israel
- Everytown for Gun Safety (post-primary)
- Hindu American PAC

==== Fundraising ====
Campaign finance reports as of September 30, 2024
Candidate	Raised	Spent	Cash on hand
Andrei Cherny (D)	$2,592,326 (Note: $150,036 of this total was self-funded by Cherny.)	$2,581,642	$10,685
Marlene Galán-Woods (D)	$1,776,275 (Note: $113,178 of this total was self-funded by Galán-Woods.)	$1,773,390	$2,885
Andrew Horne (D)	$1,508,528 (Note: $1,329,537 of this total was self-funded by Horne.)	$1,483,737	$24,791
Kurt Kroemer (D)	$297,460 (Note: $145,627 of this total was self-funded by Kroemer.)	$297,460	$0
Conor O'Callaghan (D)	$2,208,809 (Note: $1,118,112 of this total was self-funded by O'Callaghan.)	$2,077,400	$0
Amish Shah (D)	$4,930,584 (Note: $194,325 of this total was self-funded by Shah.)	$3,432,166	$1,498,419
Source: Federal Election Commission

==== Polling ====
Poll source	Date(s) administered	Sample size (Note: Key: A – all adults RV – registered voters LV – likely voters V – unclear)	Margin of error	Andrei Cherny	Marlene Galán-Woods	Andrew Horne	Kurt Kroemer	Conor O'Callaghan	Amish Shah	Undecided
Noble Predictive Insights	June 25–27, 2024	420 (LV)	± 4.78%	16%	14%	8%	1%	11%	16%	36%
RMG Research (Note: Poll sponsored by U.S. Term Limits)	June 10–19, 2024	406 (LV)	± 4.9%	12%	12%	11%	–	17%	15%	33% (Note: "Someone else" with 7%)

==== Debate ====
2024 Arizona's 1st congressional district Democratic primary debate
No.	Date	Host	Moderator	Link	Democratic	Democratic	Democratic	Democratic	Democratic	Democratic
Key: P Participant A Absent N Not invited I Invited W Withdrawn										
Key: P Participant A Absent N Not invited I Invited W Withdrawn					Andrei Cherny	Marlene Galán-Woods	Andrew Horne	Kurt Kroemer	Conor O'Callaghan	Amish Shah
1	May 15, 2024	The Arizona Citizens Clean Elections Commission; Arizona Media Association	Steve Goldstien; Richard Ruelas	YouTube	P	P	P	P	P	P

==== Results ====
Results by precinct Shah: 20–30% 30–40%; 40–50%; 50–60%; Cherny: 30–40% 40–50%; Woods: 30–40% 40–50%; O'Callaghan: 20–30% 30–40%; 40–50%; 50–60%; Horne: 20–30%; Tie No data

Democratic primary results
Party	Candidate	Votes	%
Democratic	Amish Shah	17,214	23.5
Democratic	Andrei Cherny	15,596	21.3
Democratic	Marlene Galán-Woods	15,490	21.2
Democratic	Conor O'Callaghan	13,539	18.5
Democratic	Andrew Horne	8,991	12.3
Democratic	Kurt Kroemer	2,356	3.2
Total votes		73,186	100.0

=== Libertarian primary ===
==== Declared ====
- Michelle Martin

=== General election ===
==== Predictions ====
Source	Ranking	As of
The Cook Political Report	Tossup	July 28, 2023
Inside Elections	Tilt R	October 31, 2024
Sabato's Crystal Ball	Lean R	November 4, 2024
Elections Daily	Lean D (flip)	November 4, 2024
CNalysis	Tossup	November 16, 2023
Decision Desk HQ	Lean R	October 21, 2024

==== Polling ====
Poll source	Date(s) administered	Sample size	Margin of error	David Schweikert (R)	Amish Shah (D)	Undecided
GBAO (D) (Note: Poll sponsored by House Majority PAC, a Democratic group)	August 8–13, 2024	(LV)	–	47%	48%	5%
Impact Research (D) (Note: Poll sponsored by the Democratic Congressional Campaign Committee)	August 1–4, 2024	500 (LV)	± 4.4%	48%	48%	4%

==== Results ====
2024 Arizona's 1st congressional district election
Party	Candidate	Votes	%
Republican	David Schweikert (incumbent)	225,538	51.91%
Democratic	Amish Shah	208,966	48.09%
Total votes		434,504	100.00%
Republican hold			

==== By county ====
County	David Schweikert Republican		Amish Shah Democratic		Margin		Total
County	#	%	#	%	#	%	Total
Maricopa (part)	225,538	51.91%	208,966	48.09%	16,572	3.81%	434,504
Totals	225,538	51.91%	208,966	48.09%	16,572	3.81%	434,504

== District 2 ==
2024 Arizona's 2nd congressional district election
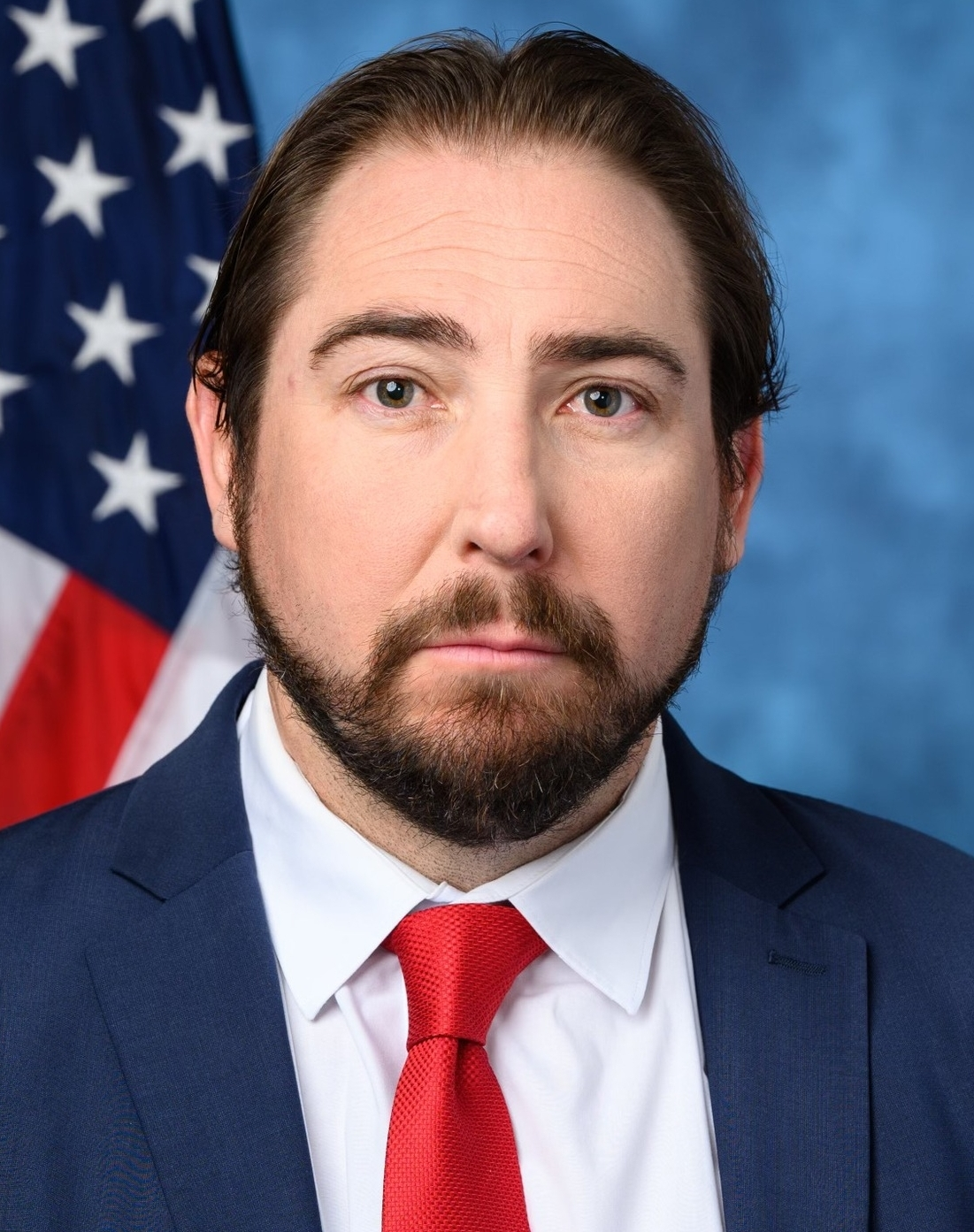

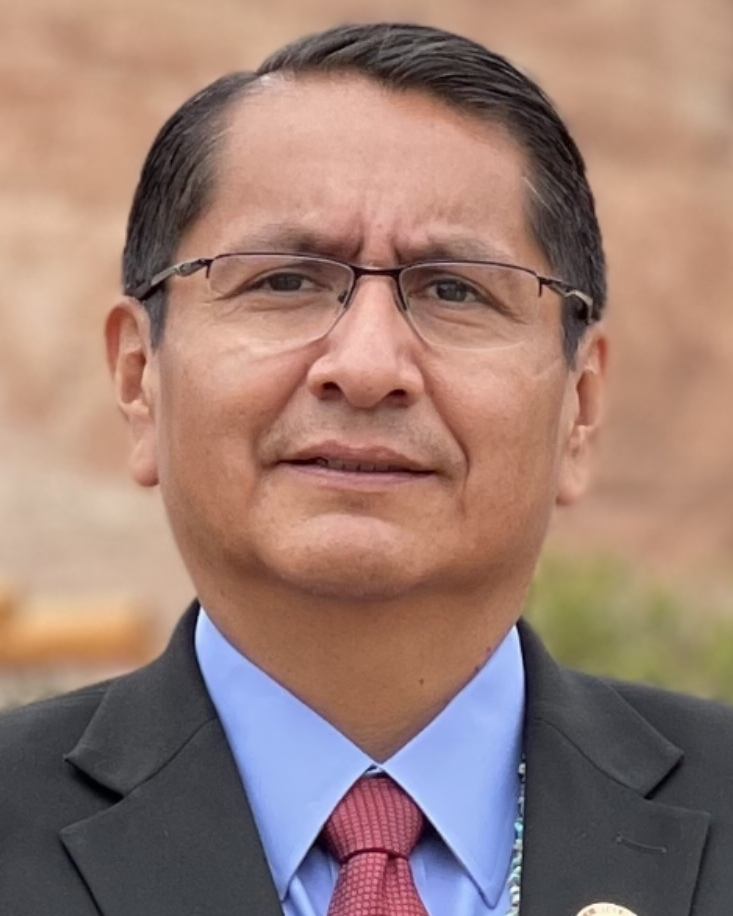
Nominee	Eli Crane	Jonathan Nez
Party	Republican	Democratic
Popular vote	221,413	184,963
Percentage	54.48%	45.51%
- Crane: 50–60% 60–70% 70–80% 80–90% >90% Nez: 50–60% 60–70% 70–80% 80–90% >90% Tie: 50%
U.S. Representative before election
Eli Crane
Republican
Elected U.S. Representative
Eli Crane
Republican

The 2nd district encompasses much of northeastern Arizona. The incumbent was first-term Republican Eli Crane, who flipped the district and was elected with 53.9% of the vote in 2022.

=== Republican primary ===
==== Nominee ====
- Eli Crane, incumbent U.S. representative

==== Eliminated in primary ====
- Jack Smith, former Arizona director for USDA Rural Development and former Yavapai County supervisor

==== Declined ====
- Mark Lamb, Pinal County sheriff (2017–2024) (ran for U.S. Senate)

==== Endorsements ====
Eli Crane

Organizations

- Club for Growth
- Turning Point Action

==== Fundraising ====
Campaign finance reports as of March 31, 2024
Candidate	Raised	Spent	Cash on hand
Eli Crane (R)	$3,935,292	$2,625,043	$1,376,504
Jack Smith (R)	$1,350	$0	$1,350
Source: Federal Election Commission

==== Results ====
Republican primary results
Party	Candidate	Votes	%
Republican	Eli Crane (incumbent)	89,480	80.5
Republican	Jack Smith	21,637	19.5
Total votes		111,117	100.0

=== Democratic primary ===
==== Nominee ====
- Jonathan Nez, former president of the Navajo Nation (2019–2023)

==== Endorsements ====
Jonathan Nez

Organizations

- National Organization for Women PAC
- Protect Our Winters Action Fund
- Stonewall Democrats of Arizona

Labor unions

- Arizona AFL-CIO
- Arizona Building and Construction Trades Council
- Arizona Western States Carpenters
- Communication Workers of America Arizona State Council
- United Food and Commercial Workers Local 99

Tribes

- San Carlos Apache Tribe
- Tohono O'odham Nation

==== Fundraising ====
Campaign finance reports as of March 31, 2024
Candidate	Raised	Spent	Cash on hand
Jonathan Nez (D)	$380,266	$154,214	$226,052
Source: Federal Election Commission

==== Results ====
Democratic primary results
Party	Candidate	Votes	%
Democratic	Jonathan Nez	62,033	100.0
Total votes		62,033	100.0

=== General election ===
==== Predictions ====
Source	Ranking	As of
The Cook Political Report	Likely R	October 22, 2024
Inside Elections	Likely R	September 12, 2024
Sabato's Crystal Ball	Likely R	October 24, 2024
Elections Daily	Likely R	October 24, 2024
CNalysis	Very Likely R	November 16, 2023
Decision Desk HQ	Safe R	October 22, 2024

==== Post-primary endorsements ====
Jonathan Nez (D)

Executive branch officials

- Kamala Harris, vice president of the United States (2021–2025)

Organizations

- Blue Dog PAC

==== Polling ====
Poll source	Date(s) administered	Sample size	Margin of error	Eli Crane (R)	Jonathan Nez (D)	Undecided
Noble Predictive Insights (Note: Polling sponsored by Inside Elections)	October 10–12, 2024	414 (LV)	± 4.8%	42%	42%	15%

==== Results ====
2024 Arizona's 2nd congressional district election
Party	Candidate	Votes	%
Republican	Eli Crane (incumbent)	221,413	54.48%
Democratic	Jonathan Nez	184,963	45.51%
Write-in		55	0.01%
Total votes		406,431	100.00%
Republican hold			

==== By county ====
County	Eli Crane Republican		Jonathan Nez Democratic		Write-in Various		Margin		Total
County	#	%	#	%	#	%	#	%	Total
Apache	9,792	30.79%	22,012	69.20%	3	0.01%	-12,220	-38.42%	31,807
Coconino	24,602	35.93%	43,868	64.06%	10	0.01%	-19,266	-28.13%	68,480
Gila	17,584	66.14%	8,994	33.83%	7	0.03%	8,590	32.31%	26,585
Graham (part)	101	8.86%	1,039	91.14%	0	0.00%	-938	-82.28%	1,140
Maricopa (part)	99	16.81%	490	83.19%	0	0.00%	-391	-66.38%	589
Mohave (part)	87	27.62%	228	72.38%	0	0.00%	-141	-44.76%	315
Navajo	26,635	53.37%	23,273	46.63%	2	0.00%	3,362	6.74%	49,910
Pinal (part)	46,905	57.29%	34,964	42.70%	7	0.01%	11,941	14.58%	81,876
Yavapai	95,608	65.61%	50,095	34.38%	26	0.02%	45,513	31.23%	145,729
Totals	221,413	54.48%	184,963	45.51%	55	0.01%	36,450	8.97%	406,431

== District 3 ==
2024 Arizona's 3rd congressional district election
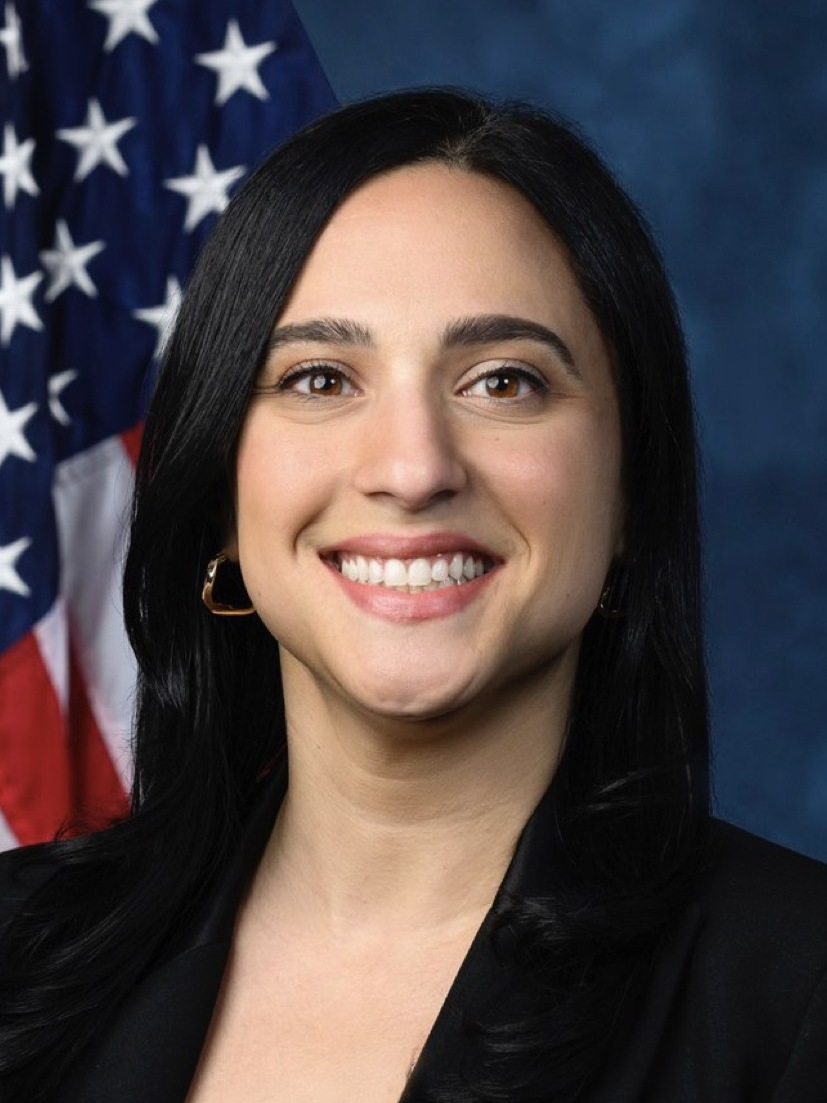

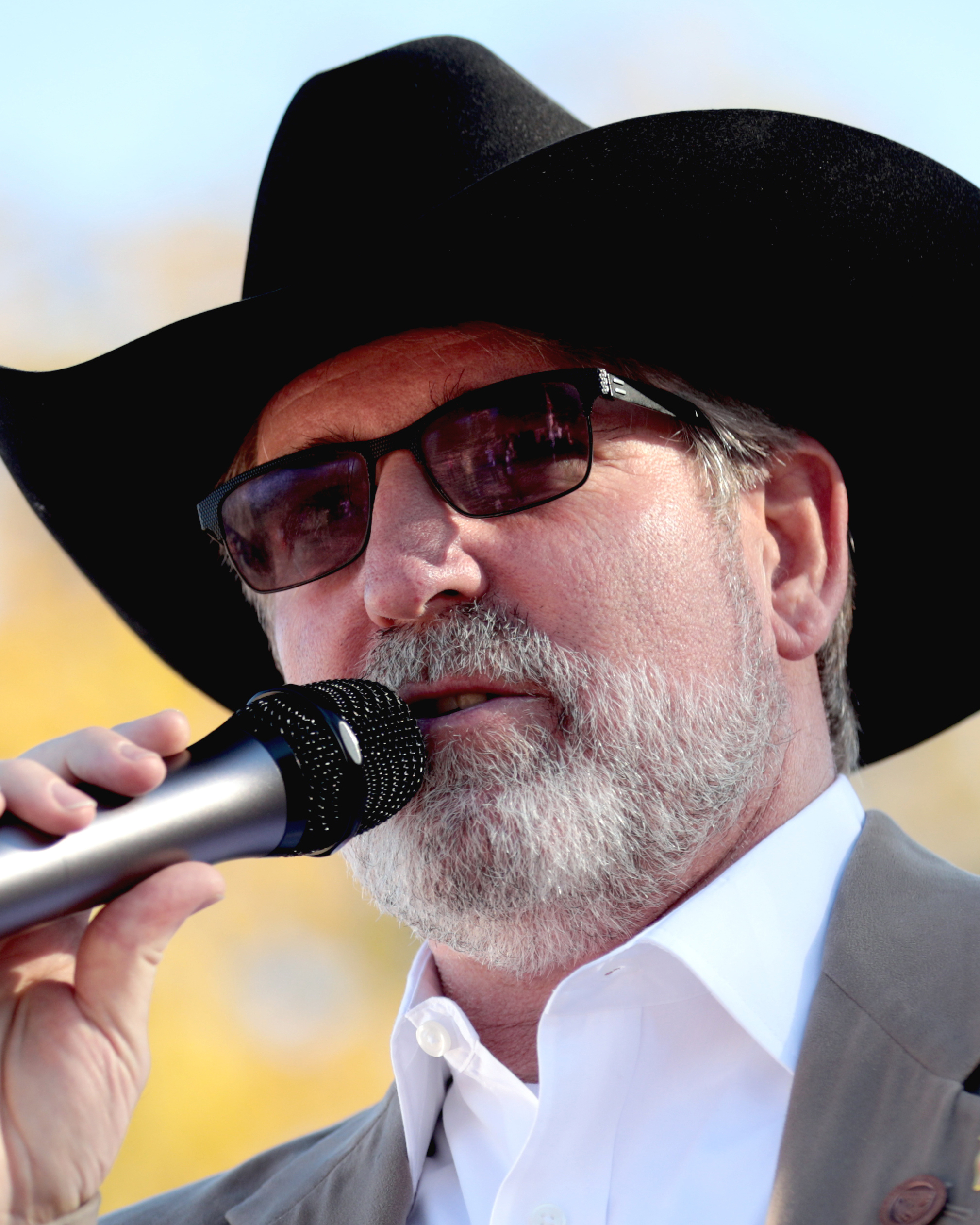
Nominee	Yassamin Ansari	Jeff Zink
Party	Democratic	Republican
Popular vote	143,336	53,705
Percentage	70.9%	26.6%
- Ansari: 50–60% 60–70% 70–80% 80–90% >90% Zink: 40–50% Tie: 50% No votes
U.S. Representative before election
Ruben Gallego
Democratic
Elected U.S. Representative
Yassamin Ansari
Democratic

The 3rd district is majority-Latino and is based in downtown and western Phoenix. The incumbent was Democrat Ruben Gallego, who was re-elected with 77.0% of the vote in 2022. He did not seek re-election, instead successfully running for U.S. Senate.

=== Democratic primary ===
==== Nominee ====
- Yassamin Ansari, former Phoenix city councilor (2021–2024)

==== Eliminated in primary ====
- Raquel Terán, former minority leader of the Arizona Senate (2023) from the 26th district (2021–2023) and former chair of the Arizona Democratic Party (2021–2023)
- Duane Wooten, pediatrician

==== Withdrawn ====
- Ylenia Aguilar, member of the Central Arizona Water Conservation District Board and the Osborn School District Board (endorsed Terán, ran for Corporation Commission)
- Laura Pastor, Phoenix city councilor from the 4th district and daughter of former U.S. Representative Ed Pastor

==== Declined ====
- Steve Gallardo, Maricopa County supervisor from the 5th district (2015–present) and former state senator from the 29th district (2003–2009, 2011–2015) (ran for re-election)
- Kate Gallego, mayor of Phoenix (2019–present)
- Ruben Gallego, incumbent U.S. representative (ran for U.S. Senate)

==== Endorsements ====
Yassamin Ansari

Federal legislators

- Seth Moulton, U.S. representative from Massachusetts's 6th congressional district (2015–present)

State legislators

- Adrian Boafo, Maryland state delegate from the 23rd district (2023–present) (post-primary)

Labor unions

- Arizona AFL-CIO (co-endorsement with Terán)
- Arizona Building Trades Unions
- Arizona Federation of Teachers
- International Association of Fire Fighters

Organizations

- Democratic Majority for Israel PAC
- Everytown for Gun Safety (post-primary)
- National Organization for Women PAC
Raquel Terán

U.S. senators

- Mark Kelly, U.S. senator from Arizona (2020–present)
- Bernie Sanders, U.S. senator from Vermont (2007–present) (Independent)
- Elizabeth Warren, U.S. senator from Massachusetts (2013–present)

U.S. representatives

- Ann Kirkpatrick, former U.S. representative from Arizona's 2nd congressional district (2009–2011, 2013–2017, 2019–2023)

Labor unions

- Arizona AFL-CIO (co-endorsement with Ansari)
- Arizona Education Association
- Communications Workers of America Arizona State Council
- United Food and Commercial Workers Local 99

Organizations

- Congressional Hispanic Caucus BOLD PAC
- Congressional Progressive Caucus PAC
- End Citizens United
- Latino Victory
- League of Conservation Voters
- Our Revolution
- People's Action
- Planned Parenthood Action Fund
- PODER PAC
- Reproductive Freedom for All
- Sunrise Movement
- UnidosUS
- Vote Mama
- Working Families Party

==== Polling ====
Poll source	Date(s) administered	Sample size	Margin of error	Yassamin Ansari	Raquel Terán	Duane Wooten	Other	Undecided
Lake Research Partners (D) (Note: Poll sponsored by Ansari's campaign)	July 10–14, 2024	400 (LV)	± 4.9%	41%	30%	4%	–	21%
Target Smart (Note: Poll sponsored by Progress Arizona, which supports Terán)	April 24–28, 2024	404 (LV)	± 4.9%	20%	30%	7%	6%	37%
Lake Research Partners (D)	April 17–21, 2024	425 (LV)	± 4.8%	32%	21%	8%	–	34%
Lake Research Partners (D)	October 26 – November 5, 2023	400 (LV)	± 4.9%	24%	23%	–	–	42%

==== Fundraising ====
Campaign finance reports as of March 31, 2024
Candidate	Raised	Spent	Cash on hand
Yassamin Ansari (D)	$1,408,820	$506,411	$902,409
Raquel Terán (D)	$856,888	$408,902	$447,986
Duane Wooten (D)	$36,054 (Note: $5,000 of this total was self-funded by Wooten.)	$25,477	$10,576
Source: Federal Election Commission

==== Debates ====
2024 Arizona's 3rd congressional district Democratic primary debates
No.	Date	Host	Moderator	Link	Democratic	Democratic	Democratic
Key: P Participant A Absent N Not invited I Invited W Withdrawn							
Key: P Participant A Absent N Not invited I Invited W Withdrawn					Yassamin Ansari	Raquel Terán	Duane Wooten
1	Apr. 16, 2024	Arizona PBS	Ted Simons	YouTube	P	P	P
2	May 29, 2024	The Arizona Citizens Clean Elections Commission; Arizona Media Association	Steve Goldstein; Mary Rábago	YouTube	P	P	P

==== Results ====
Democratic primary results by precinct: Ansari: 30–40%; 40–50%; 50–60%; Terán: 30–40%; 40–50%; 50–60%; 60–70%

Democratic primary results
Party	Candidate	Votes	%
Democratic	Yassamin Ansari	19,087	44.6
Democratic	Raquel Terán	19,048	44.5
Democratic	Duane Wooten	4,687	10.9
Total votes		42,822	100.0

=== Republican primary ===
==== Nominee ====
- Jeff Zink, strength conditioning specialist and nominee for this district in 2022

==== Eliminated in primary ====
- Jesus Mendoza

==== Fundraising ====
Campaign finance reports as of March 31, 2024
Candidate	Raised	Spent	Cash on hand
Jeff Zink (R)	$44,132 (Note: $30,000 of this total was self-funded by Zink.)	$47,898	$15,336
Source: Federal Election Commission

==== Debates ====
2024 Arizona's 3rd congressional district Republican primary debates
No.	Date	Host	Moderator	Link	Republican	Republican
Key: P Participant A Absent N Not invited I Invited W Withdrawn						
Key: P Participant A Absent N Not invited I Invited W Withdrawn					Jesus Mendoza	Jeff Zink
1	May 9, 2024	Arizona PBS	Ted Simons	YouTube	P	P
2	May 22, 2024	The Arizona Citizens Clean Elections Commission; Arizona Media Association	Steve Goldstein; Mary Rábago	YouTube	P	P

==== Results ====
Republican primary results
Party	Candidate	Votes	%
Republican	Jeff Zink	9,243	65.6
Republican	Jesus Mendoza	4,840	34.4
Total votes		14,083	100.0

=== Green primary ===
==== Declared ====
- Alan Aversa, teacher

=== General election ===
==== Predictions ====
Source	Ranking	As of
The Cook Political Report	Solid D	July 28, 2023
Inside Elections	Solid D	July 28, 2023
Sabato's Crystal Ball	Safe D	June 8, 2023
Elections Daily	Safe D	June 8, 2023
CNalysis	Solid D	November 16, 2023
Decision Desk HQ	Safe D	October 21, 2024

==== Debate ====
2024 Arizona's 3rd congressional district debate
No.	Date	Host	Moderator	Link	Democratic	Republican
Key: P Participant A Absent N Not invited I Invited W Withdrawn						
Key: P Participant A Absent N Not invited I Invited W Withdrawn					Yassamin Ansari	Jeff Zink
1	Oct. 17, 2024	Arizona PBS	Ted Simons	YouTube	P	P

==== Results ====
2024 Arizona's 3rd congressional district election
Party	Candidate	Votes	%
Democratic	Yassamin Ansari	143,336	70.9
Republican	Jeff Zink	53,705	26.6
Green	Alan Aversa	5,008	2.5
Write-in		16	0.0
Total votes		202,065	100.0
Democratic hold			

==== By county ====
County	Yassamin Ansari Democratic		Jeff Zink Republican		Various candidates Other parties		Margin		Total
County	#	%	#	%	#	%	#	%	Total
Maricopa (part)	143,336	70.94%	53,705	26.58%	5,024	2.49%	89,631	44.36%	202,065
Totals	143,336	70.94%	53,705	26.58%	5,024	2.49%	89,631	44.36%	202,065

== District 4 ==
2024 Arizona's 4th congressional district election
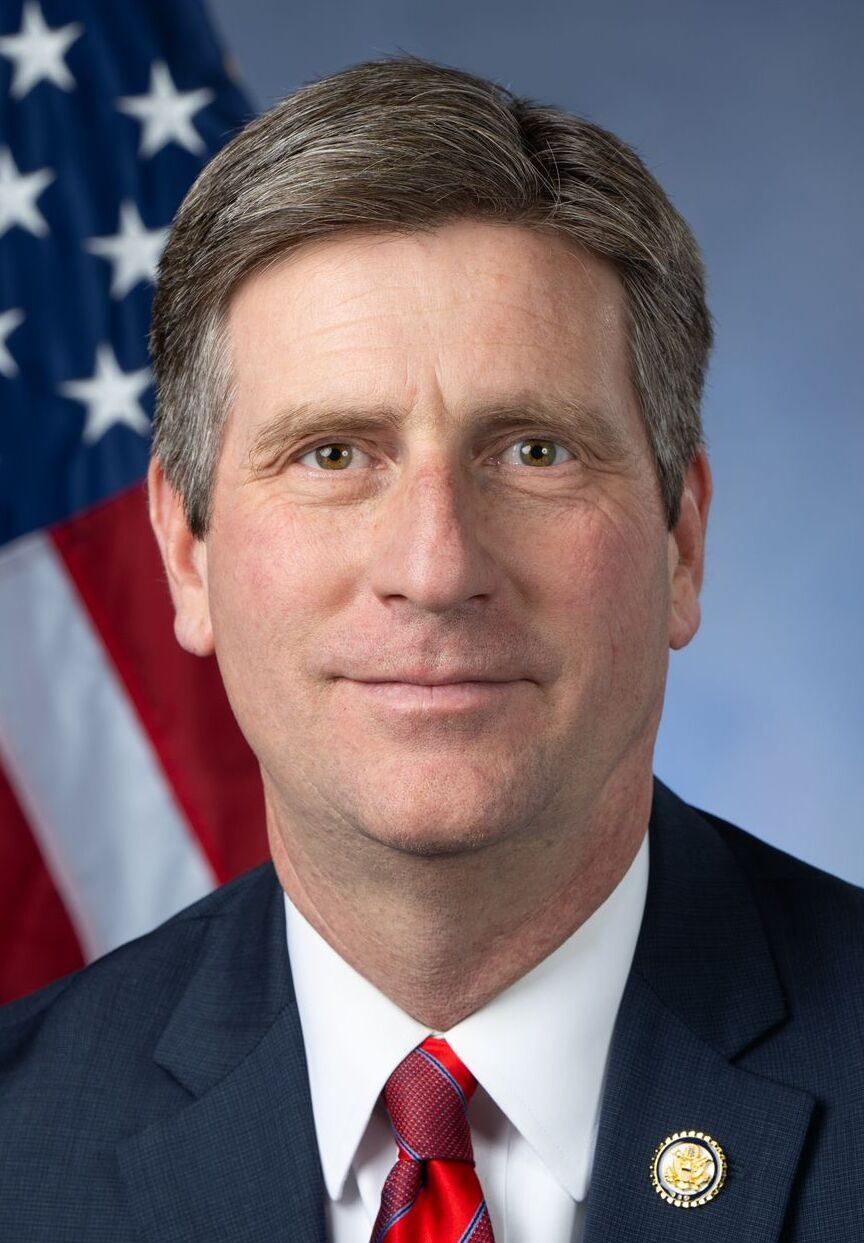

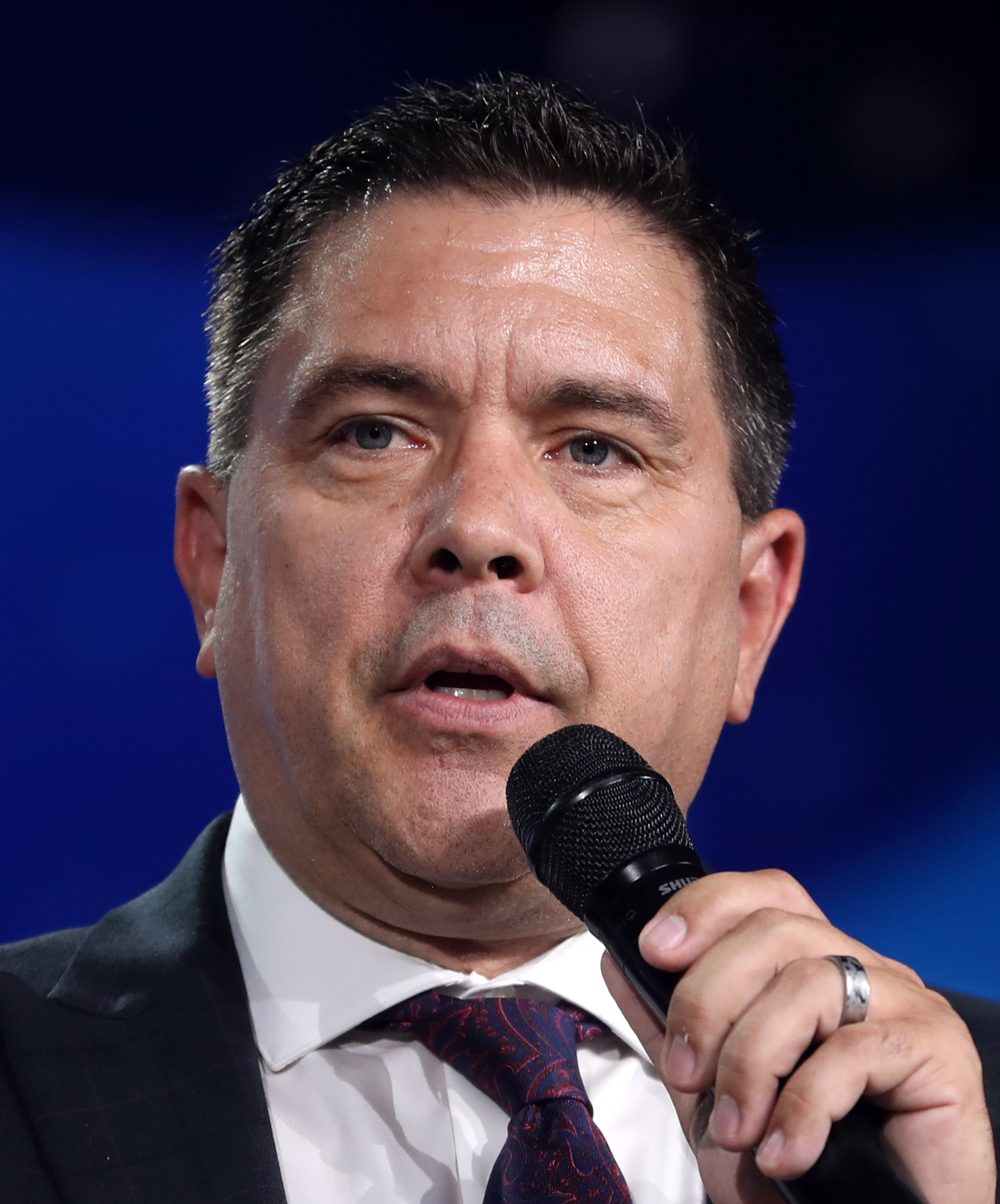
Nominee	Greg Stanton	Kelly Cooper
Party	Democratic	Republican
Popular vote	176,428	152,052
Percentage	52.74%	45.45%
- Stanton: 40–50% 50–60% 60–70% 70–80% Cooper: 40–50% 50–60% 60–70% 70–80% No votes
U.S. Representative before election
Greg Stanton
Democratic
Elected U.S. Representative
Greg Stanton
Democratic

The incumbent was Democrat Greg Stanton, who was re-elected with 56.1% of the vote in 2022.

=== Democratic primary ===
==== Nominee ====
- Greg Stanton, incumbent U.S. representative

==== Endorsements ====
Greg Stanton

Organizations

- AIPAC
- Democratic Majority for Israel
- Feminist Majority PAC
- Joint Action Committee for Political Affairs
- League of Conservation Voters
- National Organization for Women PAC
- Natural Resources Defense Council
- Planned Parenthood Action Fund
- Population Connection Action Fund
- Sierra Club
- U.S. Chamber of Commerce

Labor unions

- Arizona AFL-CIO
- Association of Flight Attendants
- National Education Association

==== Fundraising ====
Campaign finance reports as of March 31, 2024
Candidate	Raised	Spent	Cash on hand
Greg Stanton (D)	$1,541,651	$641,796	$933,196
Source: Federal Election Commission

==== Results ====
Democratic primary results
Party	Candidate	Votes	%
Democratic	Greg Stanton (incumbent)	49,178	100.0
Total votes		49,178	100.0

=== Republican primary ===
==== Nominee ====
- Kelly Cooper, restaurant owner and nominee for this district in 2022

==== Eliminated in primary ====
- Jerone Davison, pastor, former National Football League player, and candidate for this district in 2022
- Dave Giles, engineer, perennial candidate, and nominee for this district in 2016 and 2020
- Zuhdi Jasser, physician and Islamic reformer

==== Fundraising ====
Campaign finance reports as of March 31, 2024
Candidate	Raised	Spent	Cash on hand
Kelly Cooper (R)	$363,908 (Note: $50,214 of this total was self-funded by Cooper.)	$336,052	$86,600
Dave Giles (R)	$69,898 (Note: $1,255 of this total was self-funded by Giles.)	$65,620	$4,278
Zuhdi Jasser (R)	$428,273	$171,701	$256,571
Jerone Davidson (R)	$32,121	$31,096	$1,024
Source: Federal Election Commission

==== Debate ====
2024 Arizona's 4th congressional district Republican primary debate
No.	Date	Host	Moderator	Link	Republican	Republican	Republican	Republican
Key: P Participant A Absent N Not invited I Invited W Withdrawn								
Key: P Participant A Absent N Not invited I Invited W Withdrawn					Kelly Cooper	Jerone Davison	Dave Giles	Zuhdi Jasser
1	May 29, 2024	The Arizona Citizens Clean Elections Commission; Arizona Media Association	Richard Ruelas	YouTube	P	P	P	P

==== Results ====
Republican primary results by precinct: Cooper: 20–30%; 30–40%; 40–50%; Jasser: 20–30%; 30–40%; 60–70%; Giles: 20–30%; 30–40%; Davison: 30–40%; 40–50%; Tie: 20–30%; 30–40%

Republican primary results
Party	Candidate	Votes	%
Republican	Kelly Cooper	18,902	32.0
Republican	Zuhdi Jasser	15,929	27.0
Republican	Dave Giles	13,575	23.0
Republican	Jerone Davison	10,664	18.1
Total votes		59,070	100.0

=== General election ===
==== Predictions ====
Source	Ranking	As of
The Cook Political Report	Solid D	July 28, 2023
Inside Elections	Solid D	July 28, 2023
Sabato's Crystal Ball	Safe D	June 8, 2023
Elections Daily	Safe D	June 8, 2023
CNalysis	Solid D	November 16, 2023
Decision Desk HQ	Likely D	October 21, 2024

==== Results ====
2024 Arizona's 4th congressional district election
Party	Candidate	Votes	%
Democratic	Greg Stanton (incumbent)	176,428	52.74%
Republican	Kelly Cooper	152,052	45.45%
Green	Vincent Beck-Jones	6,065	1.81%
Total votes		334,545	100.00%
Democratic hold			

==== By county ====
County	Greg Stanton Democratic		Kelly Cooper Republican		Vincent Beck-Jones Green		Margin		Total
County	#	%	#	%	#	%	#	%	Total
Maricopa (part)	176,428	52.74%	152,052	45.45%	6,065	1.81%	24,376	7.29%	334,545
Totals	176,428	52.74%	152,052	45.45%	6,065	1.81%	24,376	7.29%	334,545

== District 5 ==
2024 Arizona's 5th congressional district election
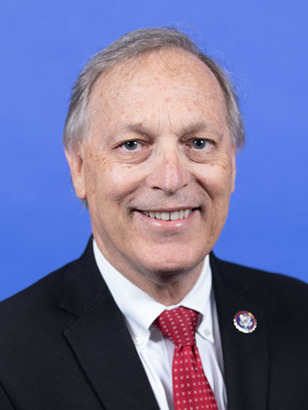

Nominee	Andy Biggs	Katrina Schaffner
Party	Republican	Democratic
Popular vote	255,628	167,680
Percentage	60.4%	39.6%
- Biggs: 50–60% 60–70% 70–80% 80–90% Schaffner: 50–60%
U.S. Representative before election
Andy Biggs
Republican
Elected U.S. Representative
Andy Biggs
Republican

The incumbent was Republican Andy Biggs, who was re-elected with 56.7% of the vote in 2022.

=== Republican primary ===
==== Nominee ====
- Andy Biggs, incumbent U.S. representative

==== Endorsements ====
Andy Biggs

Organizations

- AIPAC
- Turning Point Action

==== Fundraising ====
Campaign finance reports as of March 31, 2024
Candidate	Raised	Spent	Cash on hand
Andy Biggs (R)	$901,114	$723,897	$412,689
Source: Federal Election Commission

==== Results ====
Republican primary results
Party	Candidate	Votes	%
Republican	Andy Biggs (incumbent)	91,820	100.0
Total votes		91,820	100.0

=== Democratic primary ===
==== Nominee ====
- Katrina Schaffner, cosmetology business owner

==== Fundraising ====
Campaign finance reports as of March 31, 2024
Candidate	Raised	Spent	Cash on hand
Katrina Schaffner (D)	$5,426	$1,627	$7,578
Source: Federal Election Commission

==== Results ====
Democratic primary results
Party	Candidate	Votes	%
Democratic	Katrina Schaffner	42,396	100.0
Total votes		42,396	100.0

=== Independents and third-party candidates ===
==== Filed paperwork ====
- Clint Smith, attorney and candidate for this seat in 2022 (Independent)

==== Withdrawn ====
- Evan Olson (Independent), sales director (ran for state senate)

=== General election ===
==== Predictions ====
Source	Ranking	As of
The Cook Political Report	Solid R	July 28, 2023
Inside Elections	Solid R	July 28, 2023
Sabato's Crystal Ball	Safe R	June 8, 2023
Elections Daily	Safe R	June 8, 2023
CNalysis	Solid R	November 16, 2023
Decision Desk HQ	Safe R	October 21, 2024

==== Results ====
2024 Arizona's 5th congressional district election
Party	Candidate	Votes	%
Republican	Andy Biggs (incumbent)	255,628	60.4
Democratic	Katrina Schaffner	167,680	39.6
Total votes		423,308	100.0
Republican hold			

==== By county ====
County	Andy Biggs Republican		Katrina Schaffner Democratic		Margin		Total
County	#	%	#	%	#	%	Total
Maricopa (part)	202,984	59.06%	140,694	40.94%	62,290	18.12%	343,678
Pinal (part)	52,644	66.11%	26,986	33.89%	25,658	32.22%	79,630
Totals	255,628	60.39%	167,680	39.61%	87,948	20.78%	423,308

== District 6 ==
2024 Arizona's 6th congressional district election
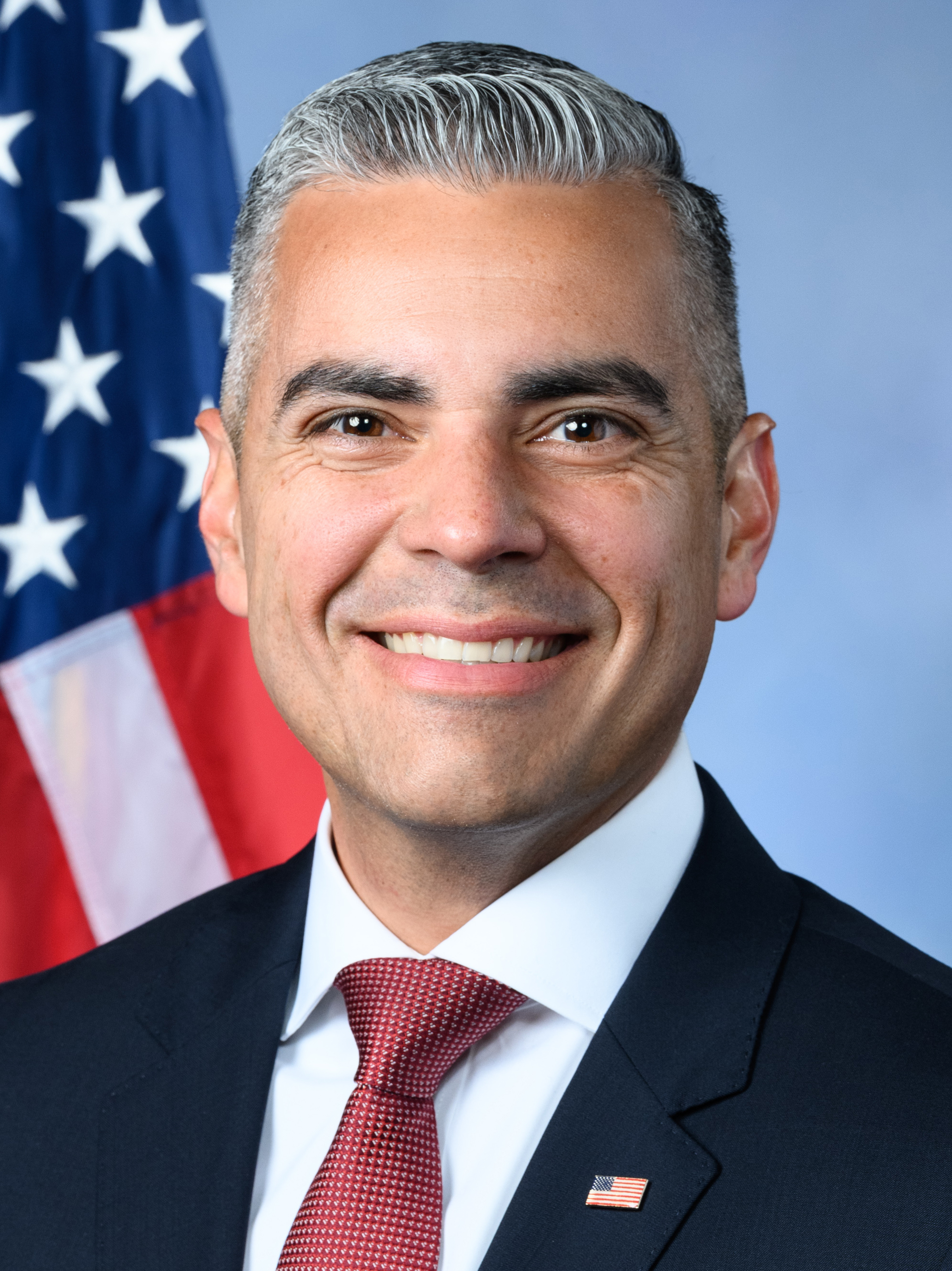

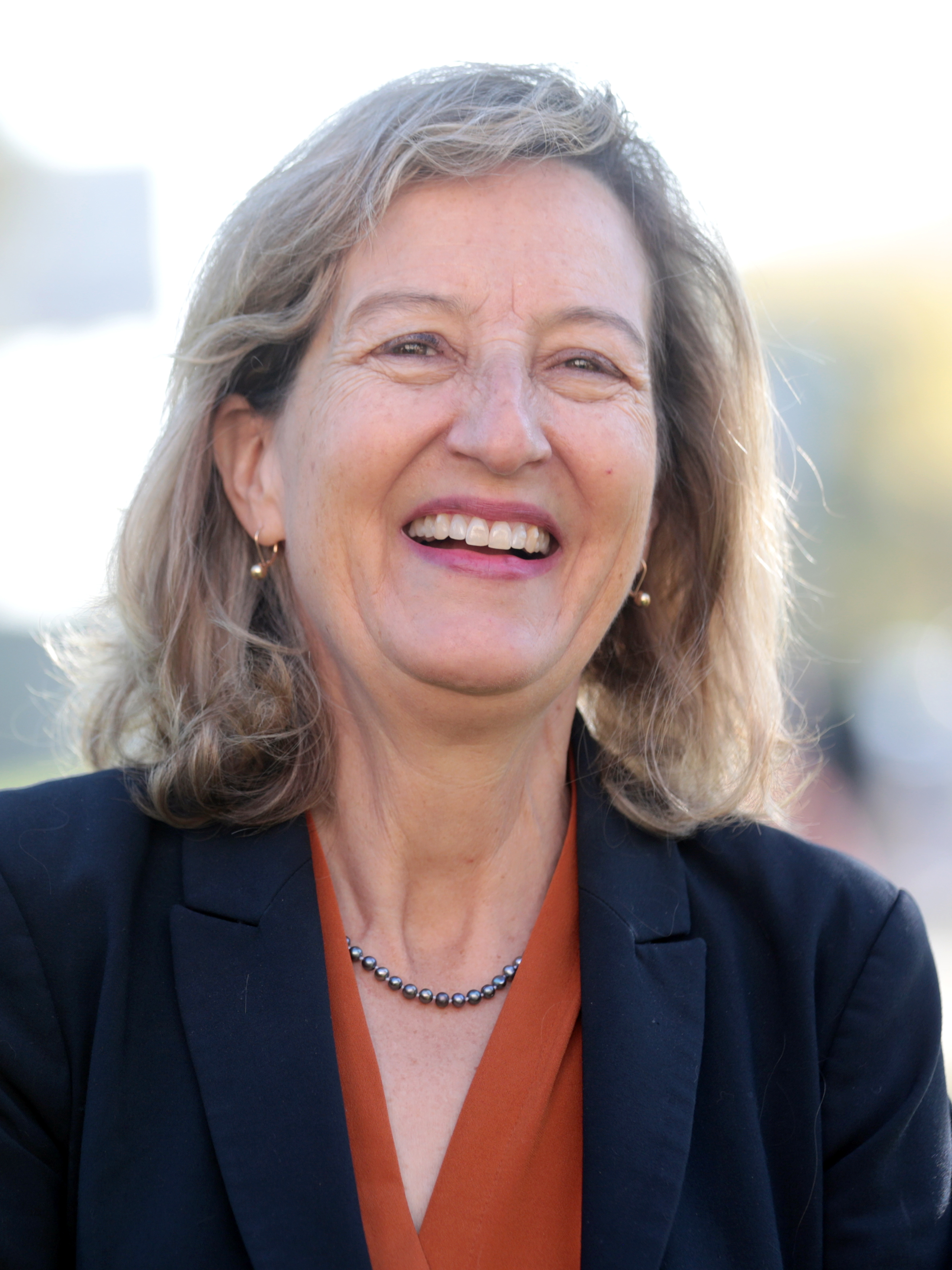
Nominee	Juan Ciscomani	Kirsten Engel
Party	Republican	Democratic
Popular vote	215,596	204,774
Percentage	50.00%	47.49%
- Ciscomani: 40–50% 50–60% 60–70% 70–80% 80–90% >90% Engel: 40–50% 50–60% 60–70% 70–80%
U.S. Representative before election
Juan Ciscomani
Republican
Elected U.S. Representative
Juan Ciscomani
Republican

The incumbent was first-term Republican Juan Ciscomani, who flipped the district and was elected with 50.8% of the vote in 2022.

=== Republican primary ===
==== Nominee ====
- Juan Ciscomani, incumbent U.S. representative

==== Eliminated in primary ====
- Kathleen Winn, former member of the Maricopa County Community College District Governing Board and candidate for this district in 2022

==== Endorsements ====
Juan Ciscomani

Organizations

- AIPAC
- American Bankers Association
- Americans for Prosperity
- Log Cabin Republicans PAC
- National Federation of Independent Business
- Pro-Israel America
- Republican Jewish Coalition
- U.S. Chamber of Commerce (post-primary)
Kathleen Winn

Individuals

- Cindy Biggs, activist and wife of U.S. Representative Andy Biggs

==== Fundraising ====
Campaign finance reports as of March 31, 2024
Candidate	Raised	Spent	Cash on hand
Juan Ciscomani (R)	$3,358,989	$961,074	$2,452,350
Kathleen Winn (R)	$80,878	$76,802	$4,075
Source: Federal Election Commission

==== Debate ====
2024 Arizona's 6th congressional district Republican primary debate
No.	Date	Host	Moderator	Link	Republican	Republican
Key: P Participant A Absent N Not invited I Invited W Withdrawn						
Key: P Participant A Absent N Not invited I Invited W Withdrawn					Juan Ciscomani	Kathleen Winn
1	Jun. 5, 2024	The Arizona Citizens Clean Elections Commission; Arizona Media Association	Jim Nintzel	YouTube	A	P

==== Results ====
Results by county: Ciscomani: 50–60%; 60–70%; 70–80%

Republican primary results
Party	Candidate	Votes	%
Republican	Juan Ciscomani (incumbent)	59,021	59.2
Republican	Kathleen Winn	40,625	40.8
Total votes		99,646	100.0

=== Democratic primary ===
==== Nominee ====
- Kirsten Engel, former state senator from the 10th district (2021) and nominee for this district in 2022

==== Withdrawn ====
- Jack O'Donnell, development executive and former Trump Plaza vice president

==== Endorsements ====
Kirsten Engel

U.S. senators

- Mark Kelly, U.S. senator from Arizona (2020–present)

U.S. representatives

- Lois Frankel, U.S. representative from Florida's 22nd congressional district (2013–present)
- Gabby Giffords, U.S. representative from Arizona's 8th congressional district (2007–2012)

Statewide officials

- Gretchen Whitmer, governor of Michigan (2019–present)

Organizations

- Council for a Livable World
- DCCC Red to Blue
- Democratic Majority for Israel
- End Citizens United
- Everytown for Gun Safety
- EMILY's List
- Giffords
- Human Rights Campaign
- J Street PAC
- Jewish Democratic Council of America
- League of Conservation Voters
- National Organization for Women PAC
- National Women's Political Caucus
- NewDem Action Fund
- Planned Parenthood Action Fund
- Population Connection Action Fund
- Reproductive Freedom for All
- Sierra Club
- UnidosUS

Labor unions

- Arizona AFL-CIO
- National Education Association

==== Fundraising ====
Campaign finance reports as of March 31, 2024
Candidate	Raised	Spent	Cash on hand
Kirsten Engel (D)	$2,509,530	$638,525	$1,872,318
Source: Federal Election Commission

==== Results ====
Democratic primary results
Party	Candidate	Votes	%
Democratic	Kirsten Engel	78,178	100.0
Total votes		78,178	100.0

=== Libertarian primary ===
==== Declared ====
- Vance Cast, educator
- Mark Siarto

==== Fundraising ====
Campaign finance reports as of March 31, 2024
Candidate	Raised	Spent	Cash on hand
Vance Cast (L)	$50,009 (Note: $50,000 of this total was self-funded by Cast.)	$36,707	$13,301
Source: Federal Election Commission

=== General election ===
==== Predictions ====
Source	Ranking	As of
The Cook Political Report	Tossup	July 28, 2023
Inside Elections	Tossup	October 31, 2024
Sabato's Crystal Ball	Lean R	November 4, 2024
Elections Daily	Lean R	November 4, 2024
CNalysis	Tossup	November 16, 2023
Decision Desk HQ	Likely R	October 21, 2024

==== Polling ====
Poll source	Date(s) administered	Sample size	Margin of error	Juan Ciscomani (R)	Kirsten Engel (D)	Undecided
Change Research (D) (Note: Poll sponsored by Economic Security Project Action, a Democratic group)	July 9–12, 2024	855 (LV)	± 3.8%	43%	44%	13%
Public Opinion Strategies (R) (Note: Poll sponsored by Ciscomani's campaign)	May 28–30, 2024	300 (RV)	± 5.7%	50%	39%	11%

Hypothetical polling

Generic Republican vs. generic Democrat

Poll source	Date(s) administered	Sample size	Margin of error	Generic Republican	Generic Democrat	Undecided
Change Research (D)	July 9–12, 2024	855 (LV)	± 3.8%	46%	45%	9%

==== Debates ====
2024 Arizona's 6th congressional district debates
No.	Date	Host	Moderator	Link	Republican	Democratic
Key: P Participant A Absent N Not invited I Invited W Withdrawn						
Key: P Participant A Absent N Not invited I Invited W Withdrawn					Juan Ciscomani	Kirsten Engel
1	Aug. 29, 2024	Arizona PBS	Ted Simons	Arizona PBS	P	P
2	Oct. 8, 2024	Arizona Citizens Clean Elections Commission		C-SPAN	P	P

==== Results ====
2024 Arizona's 6th congressional district election
Party	Candidate	Votes	%
Republican	Juan Ciscomani	215,596	50.00%
Democratic	Kirsten Engel	204,774	47.49%
Green	Athena Eastwood	10,759	2.50%
Write-in		91	0.02%
Total votes		431,220	100.00%
Republican hold			

==== By county ====
County	Juan Ciscomani Republican		Kirsten Engel Democratic		Various candidates Other parties		Margin		Total
County	#	%	#	%	#	%	#	%	Total
Cochise (part)	30,620	65.00%	14,983	31.81%	1,504	3.19%	15,637	33.19%	47,107
Graham (part)	10,534	76.66%	2,871	20.89%	336	2.45%	7,663	55.77%	13,741
Greenlee	2,110	65.77%	992	30.92%	106	3.30%	1,118	34.85%	3,208
Pima (part)	150,660	45.93%	169,358	51.63%	8,020	2.44%	-18,698	-5.70%	328,038
Pinal (part)	21,672	55.39%	16,570	42.35%	884	2.26%	5,102	13.04%	39,126
Totals	215,596	50.00%	204,774	47.49%	10,850	2.52%	10,822	2.51%	431,220

== District 7 ==
2024 Arizona's 7th congressional district election
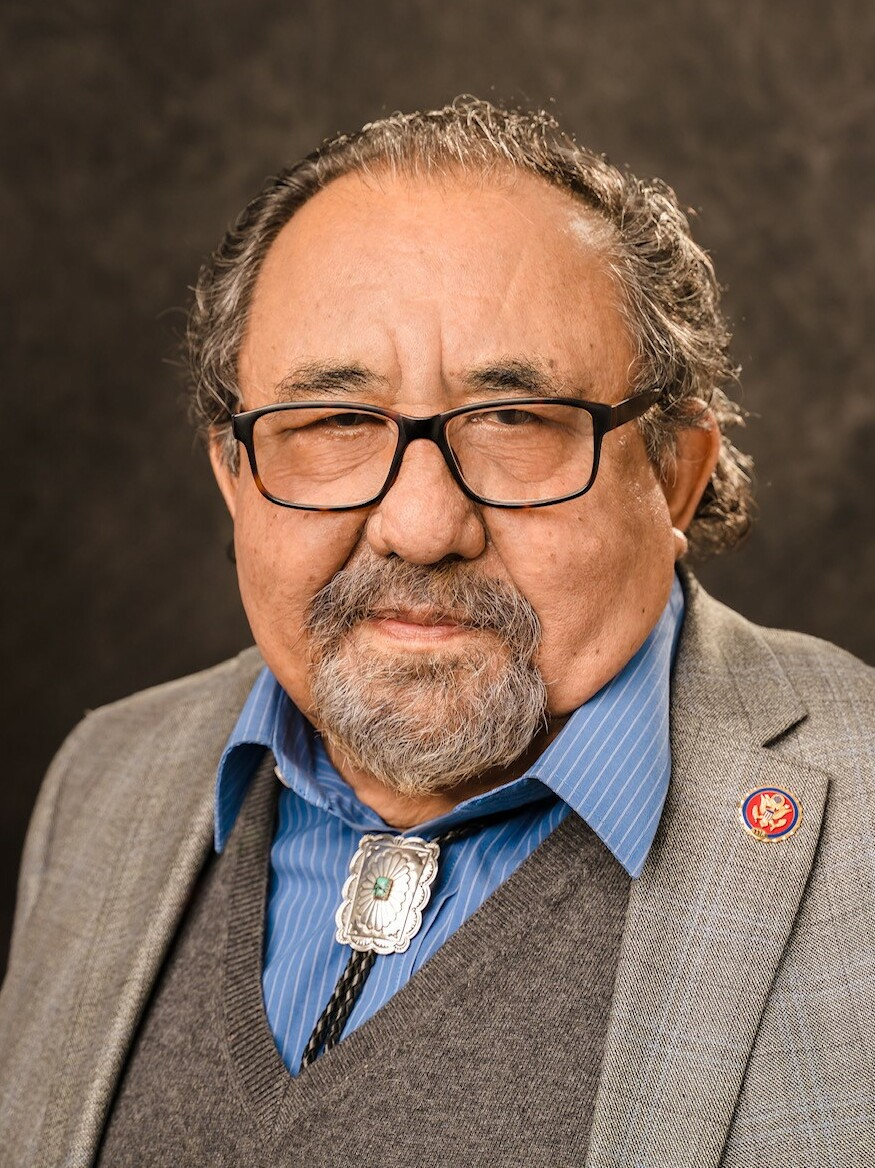

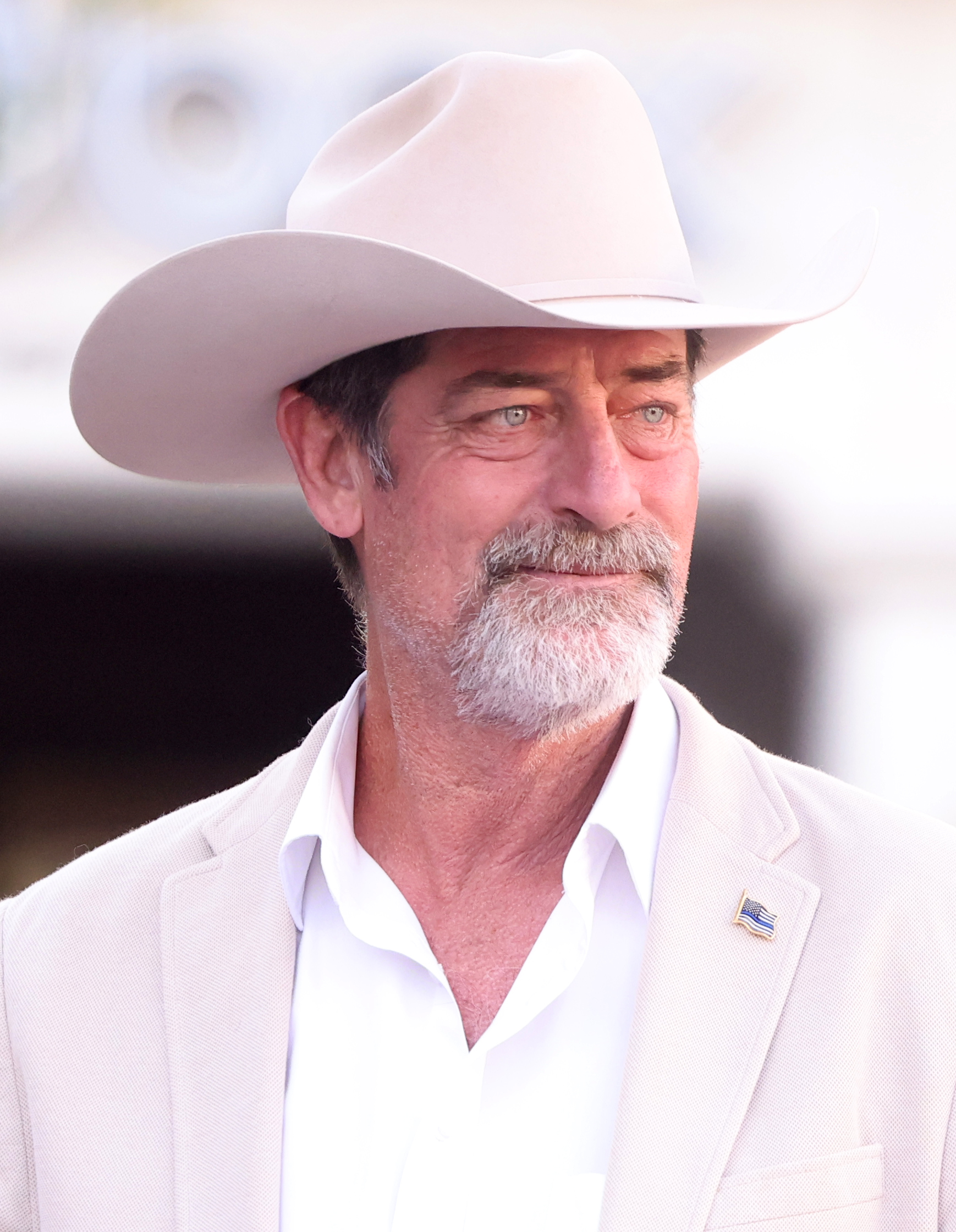
Nominee	Raúl Grijalva	Daniel Butierez
Party	Democratic	Republican
Popular vote	171,954	99,057
Percentage	63.4%	36.6%
- Grijalva: 50–60% 60–70% 70–80% 80–90% >90% Butierez: 50–60% 60–70% 70–80% 80–90%
U.S. Representative before election
Raúl Grijalva
Democratic
Elected U.S. Representative
Raúl Grijalva
Democratic

The 7th district is majority-Hispanic and covers most of the Mexico–United States border in Arizona, including parts of Tucson and Yuma. The incumbent was Democrat Raúl Grijalva, who won with 64.5% of the vote in 2022.

=== Democratic primary ===
==== Nominee ====
- Raúl Grijalva, incumbent U.S. representative

==== Endorsements ====
Raúl Grijalva

Organizations

- Bend the Arc
- Feminist Majority PAC
- J Street PAC
- Justice Democrats
- League of Conservation Voters
- Natural Resources Defense Council
- Population Connection Action Fund
- Sierra Club

Labor unions

- Association of Flight Attendants
- National Education Association

==== Fundraising ====
Campaign finance reports as of March 31, 2024
Candidate	Raised	Spent	Cash on hand
Raúl Grijalva (D)	$330,251	$223,597	$312,859
Source: Federal Election Commission

==== Results ====
Democratic primary results
Party	Candidate	Votes	%
Democratic	Raúl Grijalva (incumbent)	55,133	100.0
Total votes		55,133	100.0

=== Republican primary ===
==== Nominee ====
- Daniel Butierez, painting contractor

==== Fundraising ====
Campaign finance reports as of March 31, 2024
Candidate	Raised	Spent	Cash on hand
Daniel Butierez (R)	$6,757	$11,233	$0
Source: Federal Election Commission

==== Results ====
Republican primary results
Party	Candidate	Votes	%
Republican	Daniel Butierez	24,425	100.0
Total votes		24,425	100.0

=== General election ===
==== Predictions ====
Source	Ranking	As of
The Cook Political Report	Solid D	July 28, 2023
Inside Elections	Solid D	July 28, 2023
Sabato's Crystal Ball	Safe D	June 8, 2023
Elections Daily	Safe D	June 8, 2023
CNalysis	Solid D	November 16, 2023
Decision Desk HQ	Safe D	October 21, 2024

==== Results ====
2024 Arizona's 7th congressional district election
Party	Candidate	Votes	%
Democratic	Raúl Grijalva	171,954	63.4
Republican	Daniel Butierez	99,057	36.6
Total votes		271,011	100.0
Democratic hold			

==== By county ====
County	Raúl Grijalva Democratic		Daniel Butierez Republican		Margin		Total votes cast
County	#	%	#	%	#	%	Total votes cast
Cochise (part)	6,543	62.31%	3,957	37.69%	2,586	24.63%	10,500
Maricopa (part)	22,394	62.00%	13,726	38.00%	8,668	24.00%	36,120
Pima (part)	113,269	65.63%	59,306	34.37%	53,963	31.27%	172,575
Pinal (part)	847	34.28%	1,624	65.72%	-777	-31.44%	2,471
Santa Cruz	11,946	63.75%	6,793	36.25%	5,153	27.50%	18,739
Yuma (part)	16,955	55.40%	13,651	44.60%	3,304	10.80%	30,606
Totals	171,954	63.45%	99,057	36.55%	72,897	26.90%	271,011

== District 8 ==
2024 Arizona's 8th congressional district election
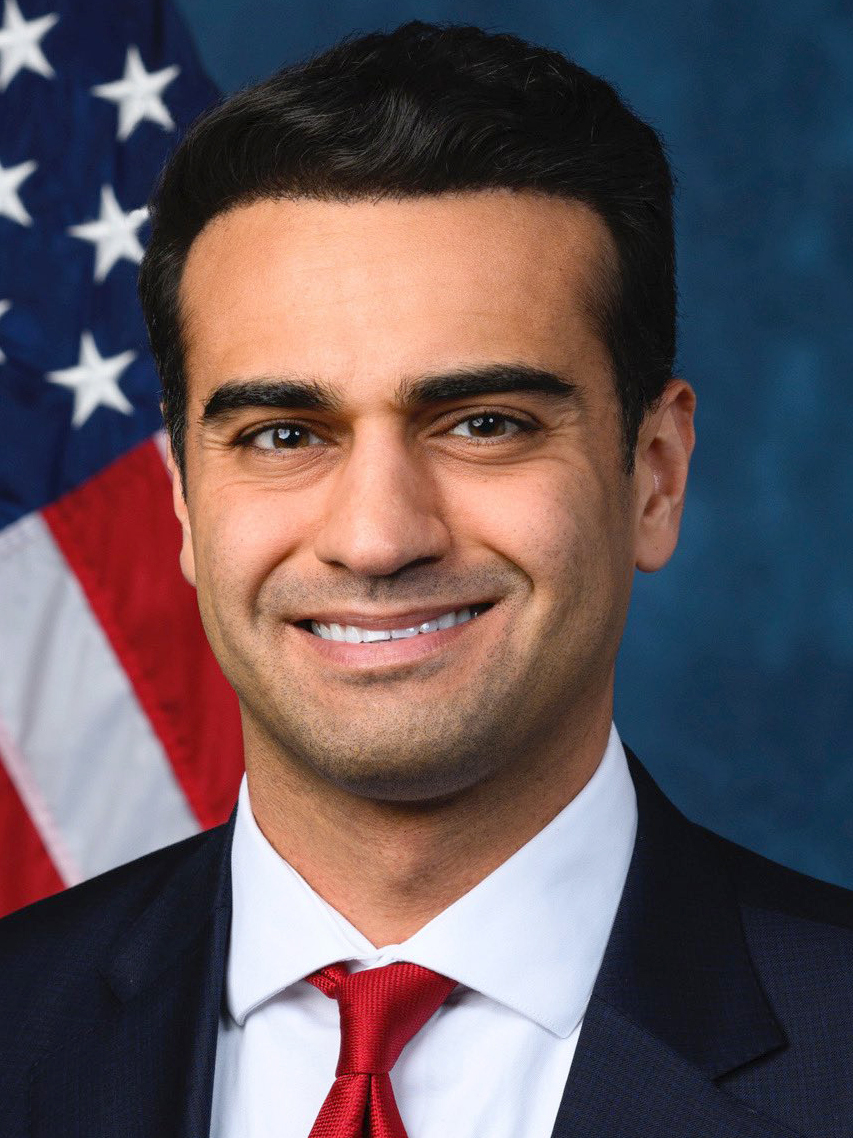

Nominee	Abraham Hamadeh	Greg Whitten
Party	Republican	Democratic
Popular vote	208,269	160,344
Percentage	56.50%	43.50%
- Hamadeh: 50–60% 60–70% 70–80% Whitten: 50–60% 60–70% 70–80% Tie: 40–50% No votes
U.S. Representative before election
Debbie Lesko
Republican
Elected U.S. Representative
Abraham Hamadeh
Republican

The incumbent was Republican Debbie Lesko, who was re-elected unopposed in 2022 with 96% of the vote (facing only write-in opposition). Lesko announced in October 2023 that she would not seek re-election in 2024.

=== Republican primary ===
==== Nominee ====
- Abraham Hamadeh, former prosecutor in the Maricopa County attorney's office and nominee for attorney general in 2022

==== Eliminated in primary ====
- Pat Briody, sales representative
- Trent Franks, former U.S. representative (2003–2017)
- Anthony Kern, state senator from the 27th district (2023–2025) and 2020 fake elector for Donald Trump
- Blake Masters, venture capitalist and nominee for U.S. Senate in 2022
- Ben Toma, speaker of the Arizona House of Representatives (2023–2025) from the 27th district (2017–2025)

==== Declined ====
- Shawnna Bolick, state senator from the 2nd district (2023–present) (ran for re-election)
- Debbie Lesko, incumbent U.S. representative (ran for the Maricopa County Board of Supervisors, endorsed Toma)
- Steve Montenegro, state representative from the 29th district (2023–present) and candidate for this seat in 2018
- Elijah Norton, Arizona Republican Party treasurer and candidate for the 1st district in 2022
- Austin Smith, state representative from the 29th district (2023–2025)
- Kimberly Yee, Arizona State Treasurer (2019–present)

==== Endorsements ====
Abraham Hamadeh

U.S. executive branch officials

- Richard Grenell, acting director of National Intelligence (2020), U.S. Ambassador to Germany (2018–2020)
- Robert O'Brien, former National Security Advisor (2019–2021)
- Donald Trump, 45th president of the United States (co-endorsement with Masters (Note: Trump originally gave Hamadeh his sole endorsement in December 2023. He later issued a dual endorsement of Hamadeh and Masters on July 28, 2024, just two days before the primary election.))

Statewide officials

- Adam Laxalt, former Nevada attorney general (2015–2019)
- Patrick Morrisey, West Virginia attorney general (2013–2025)

State legislators

- Sonny Borrelli, majority leader of the Arizona Senate (2023–2025) from the 30th district (2017–2025)
- Alexander Kolodin, state representative from the 3rd district (2023–present)
- Adam Kwasman, former state representative from the 11th district (2013–2015)
- Wendy Rogers, state senator from the 7th district (2021–present)
- Janae Shamp, state senator from the 29th district (2023–present)
- Kelli Ward, former state senator from the 5th district (2013–2015) and former chair of the Arizona Republican Party (2019–2023)

Local officials

- Bernard Kerik, former New York City Police Commissioner (2000–2001)

Individuals

- Kari Lake, former KSAZ-TV news anchor
- Kash Patel, former Trump aide

Organizations

- Republicans for National Renewal
Blake Masters

U.S. executive branch officials

- Donald Trump, 45th president of the United States (co-endorsement with Hamadeh)

U.S. senators

- JD Vance, U.S. senator from Ohio (2023–2025)

U.S. representatives

- Paul Gosar, U.S. representative from Arizona (2011–present)
Ben Toma

U.S. representatives

- Debbie Lesko, incumbent U.S. representative for this district

Organizations

- Americans for Prosperity
Debbie Lesko (not running)

Organizations

- AIPAC
- Maggie's List

==== Fundraising ====
Campaign finance reports as of March 31, 2024
Candidate	Raised	Spent	Cash on hand
Pat Briody (R)	$15,618 (Note: $15,618 of this total was self-funded by Briody.)	$15,518	$100
Trent Franks (R)	$277,352 (Note: $250,000 of this total was self-funded by Franks.)	$69,881	$207,470
Abraham Hamadeh (R)	$596,623	$347,736	$248,887
Anthony Kern (R)	$170,076 (Note: $50,000 of this total was self-funded by Kern.)	$99,994	$70,082
Blake Masters (R)	$6,377,314 (Note: $6,000,000 of this total was self-funded by Masters.)	$2,026,615	$2,724,434
Ben Toma (R)	$576,571	$178,456	$398,115
Source: Federal Election Commission

==== Polling ====
Poll source	Date(s) administered	Sample size	Margin of error	Trent Franks	Abe Hamadeh	Anthony Kern	Blake Masters	Ben Toma	Other	Undecided
Data Orbital (R) (Note: Poll sponsored by Masters's campaign)	July 17–18, 2024	400 (LV)	–	13%	20%	5%	23%	17%	–	20%
Fabrizio, Lee & Associates	July 8–9, 2024	400 (LV)	± 4.9%	16%	26%	4%	27%	17%	2% (Note: Pat Briody with 2%)	9%
The Strategy Group Company (Note: Poll sponsored by Hamadeh's campaign)	June 10–12, 2024	620 (LV)	± 4.2%	12%	30%	3%	19%	10%	–	26%
Fabrizio, Lee & Associates	May 13–15, 2024	400 (LV)	–	14%	16%	2%	28%	8%	0% (Note: Briody with 0%)	32%
SPRY Strategies (Note: Poll sponsored by American Principles Project, which supports Masters)	April 24–26, 2024	500 (LV)	± 4.3%	9%	16%	3%	26%	9%	–	37%
The Tyson Group (Note: Poll sponsored by Breaking Battlegrounds)	April 20–22, 2024	305 (LV)	± 4.0%	11%	10%	3%	16%	9%	3% (Note: Briody with 3%)	48%
Fabrizio, Lee & Associates	January 25–28, 2024	400 (LV)	± 4.9%	9%	24%	1%	24%	3%	3% (Note: Isiah Gallegos with 3%)	35%
National Public Affairs (R)	December 16–17, 2023	418 (LV)	± 4.8%	6%	37%	3%	14%	7%	–	34%
National Public Affairs (R)	October 23–24, 2023	301 (LV)	± 5.6%	–	31%	–	24%	11%	–	34%
Data Orbital (R)	October 19–21, 2023	450 (LV)	± 4.7%	–	18%	6%	33%	7%	5% (Note: "Refused" with 5%)	32%

Hypothetical polling

Abe Hamadeh vs. Ben Toma

Poll source	Date(s) administered	Sample size	Margin of error	Abe Hamadeh	Ben Toma	Undecided
National Public Affairs (R)	October 23–24, 2023	301 (LV)	± 5.6%	41%	12%	47%

Abe Hamadeh vs. Blake Masters

Poll source	Date(s) administered	Sample size	Margin of error	Abe Hamadeh	Blake Masters	Undecided
National Public Affairs (R)	October 23–24, 2023	301 (LV)	± 5.6%	36%	27%	38%

Blake Masters vs. Ben Toma

Poll source	Date(s) administered	Sample size	Margin of error	Blake Masters	Ben Toma	Undecided
National Public Affairs (R)	October 23–24, 2023	301 (LV)	± 5.6%	42%	15%	43%

==== Debate ====
2024 Arizona's 8th congressional district Republican primary debate
No.	Date	Host	Moderator	Link	Republican	Republican	Republican	Republican	Republican	Republican
Key: P Participant A Absent N Not invited I Invited W Withdrawn										
Key: P Participant A Absent N Not invited I Invited W Withdrawn					Briody	Franks	Hamadeh	Kern	Masters	Toma
1	April 30, 2024	Arizona PBS	Rick DeBruhl	YouTube	I	P	P	P	P	P

==== Results ====
Results by precinct Hamadeh: 20–30%; 30–40%; 40–50%; Masters: 20–30%; 30–40%; 40–50%; 50–60%; Toma: 20–30%; 30–40%; Franks 2–candidate tie: 20–30%; 30–40%; No data

Republican primary results
Party	Candidate	Votes	%
Republican	Abraham Hamadeh	30,686	29.9
Republican	Blake Masters	26,422	25.7
Republican	Ben Toma	21,549	21.0
Republican	Trent Franks	16,714	16.3
Republican	Anthony Kern	4,922	4.8
Republican	Pat Briody	2,336	2.3
Total votes		102,629	100.0

=== Democratic primary ===
==== Nominee ====
- Greg Whitten, biosecurity contractor and former U.S. Department of Defense official

==== Endorsements ====
Greg Whitten

Labor unions

- Arizona AFL-CIO

==== Fundraising ====
Campaign finance reports as of March 31, 2024
Candidate	Raised	Spent	Cash on hand
Greg Whitten (D)	$159,740 (Note: $23,000 of this total was self-funded by Whitten.)	$129,362	$30,379
Source: Federal Election Commission

==== Results ====
Democratic primary results
Party	Candidate	Votes	%
Democratic	Greg Whitten	47,406	100.0
Total votes		47,406	100.0

=== Libertarian primary ===
==== Declared ====
- Jacob Chansley, author, convicted felon, and participant in the January 6 United States Capitol attack

=== Independents ===
==== Declared ====
- Jeremy Spreitzer, firefighter and Democratic write-in candidate for this district in 2022

=== General election ===
==== Predictions ====
Source	Ranking	As of
The Cook Political Report	Solid R	July 28, 2023
Inside Elections	Solid R	July 28, 2023
Sabato's Crystal Ball	Safe R	June 8, 2023
Elections Daily	Safe R	June 8, 2023
CNalysis	Solid R	November 16, 2023
Decision Desk HQ	Safe R	October 21, 2024

==== Results ====
2024 Arizona's 8th congressional district election
Party	Candidate	Votes	%
Republican	Abraham Hamadeh	208,269	56.50%
Democratic	Gregory Whitten	160,344	43.50%
Total votes		368,613	100.00%
Republican hold			

==== By county ====
County	Abraham Hamadeh Republican		Gregory Whitten Democratic		Margin		Total
County	#	%	#	%	#	%	Total
Maricopa (part)	208,269	56.50%	160,344	43.50%	47,925	13.00%	368,613
Totals	208,269	56.50%	160,344	43.50%	47,925	13.00%	368,613

== District 9 ==
2024 Arizona's 9th congressional district election
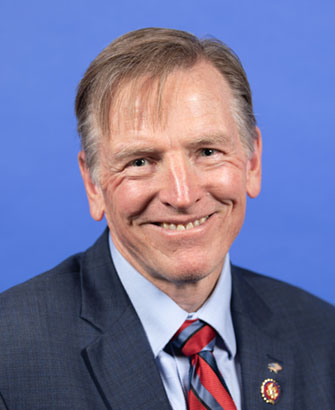

Nominee	Paul Gosar	Quacy Smith
Party	Republican	Democratic
Popular vote	249,583	132,640
Percentage	65.3%	34.7%
- Gosar: 50–60% 60–70% 70–80% 80–90% Smith: 50–60% 60–70%
U.S. Representative before election
Paul Gosar
Republican
Elected U.S. Representative
Paul Gosar
Republican

The incumbent was Republican Paul Gosar, who was re-elected unopposed in 2022.

=== Republican primary ===
==== Nominee ====
- Paul Gosar, incumbent U.S. representative

==== Endorsements ====
Paul Gosar

State legislators

- Sonny Borrelli, majority leader of the Arizona Senate (2023–2025) from the 30th district (2017–2025)
- Tim Dunn, state representative from the 25th district (2023–2025)
- John Gillette, state representative from the 30th district (2023–present)
- Austin Smith, state representative from the 29th district (2023–2025)

Local officials

- Mark Lamb, Pinal County sheriff (2017–2024)

Individuals

- Blake Masters, former president of the Thiel Foundation

Organizations

- Turning Point Action

==== Fundraising ====
Campaign finance reports as of March 31, 2024
Candidate	Raised	Spent	Cash on hand
Paul Gosar (R)	$289,507	$290,944	$118,322
Source: Federal Election Commission

==== Results ====
Republican primary results
Party	Candidate	Votes	%
Republican	Paul Gosar (incumbent)	89,308	100.0
Total votes		89,308	100.0

=== Democratic primary ===
==== Nominee ====
- Quacy Smith, lawyer

==== Fundraising ====
Campaign finance reports as of March 31, 2024
Candidate	Raised	Spent	Cash on hand
Quacy Smith (D)	$67,034 (Note: $40,000 of this total was self-funded by Smith.)	$60,889	$8,232
Source: Federal Election Commission

==== Results ====
Democratic primary results
Party	Candidate	Votes	%
Democratic	Quacy Smith	33,784	100.0
Total votes		33,784	100.0

=== General election ===
==== Predictions ====
Source	Ranking	As of
The Cook Political Report	Solid R	July 28, 2023
Inside Elections	Solid R	July 28, 2023
Sabato's Crystal Ball	Safe R	June 8, 2023
Elections Daily	Safe R	June 8, 2023
CNalysis	Solid R	November 16, 2023
Decision Desk HQ	Safe R	October 21, 2024

==== Results ====
2024 Arizona's 9th congressional district election
Party	Candidate	Votes	%
Republican	Paul Gosar	249,583	65.3
Democratic	Quacy Smith	132,640	34.7
Total votes		382,223	100.0
Republican hold			

==== By county ====
County	Paul Gosar Republican		Quacy Smith Democratic		Margin		Total
County	#	%	#	%	#	%	Total
La Paz	5,260	71.81%	2,065	28.19%	3,195	43.62%	7,325
Maricopa (part)	137,529	58.62%	97,093	41.38%	40,436	17.23%	234,622
Mohave (part)	82,372	78.17%	22,998	21.83%	59,374	56.35%	105,370
Yuma (part)	24,422	69.97%	10,484	30.03%	13,938	39.93%	34,906
Totals	249,583	65.30%	132,640	34.70%	116,943	30.60%	382,223

== Notes ==
Partisan clients
