= Amish Shah =

American politician (born 1977)

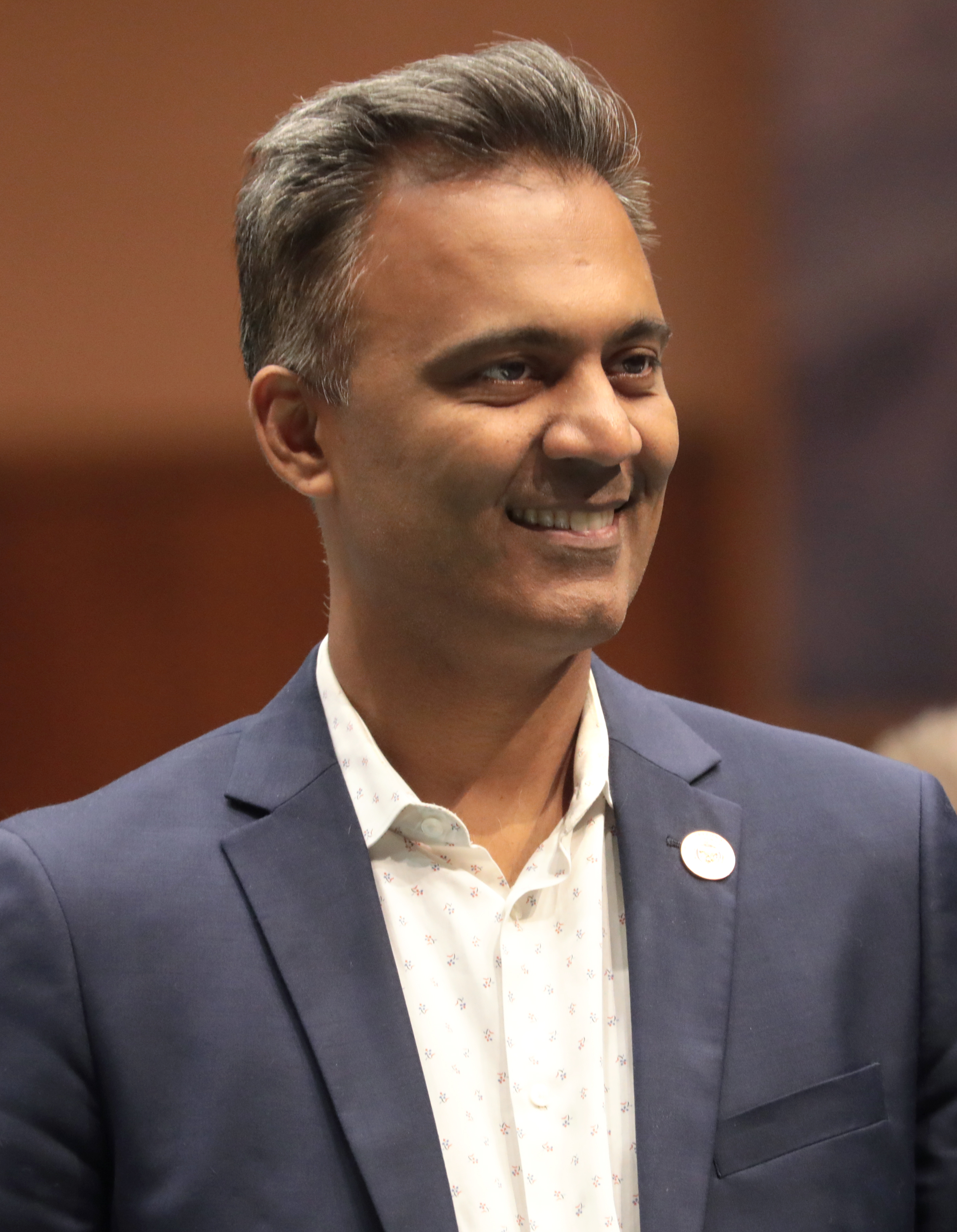
- Shah in 2023

Member-elect of the U.S. House of Representatives from Arizona's 1st district
- Assuming office January 3, 2027
- Succeeding: David Schweikert

Member of the Arizona House of Representatives
- In office January 14, 2019 – February 1, 2024 Serving with Jennifer Longdon
- Preceded by: Ken Clark
- Succeeded by: Charles Lucking
- Constituency: 24th district (2019–2023); 5th district (2023–2024)

Personal details
- Born: Amish Mahendra Shah; 1977/1978 (age 48–49) Chicago, Illinois, U.S.
- Party: Democratic
- Education: Northwestern University (BA, MD); University of California, Berkeley (MPH)
- Website: Campaign website

Amish Mahendra Shah (born 1977/1978) is an American politician and physician who is the representative-elect from Arizona's 1st congressional district. Previously, he served as a member of the Arizona House of Representatives from the 24th district from 2019 to 2023 and the 5th district from 2023 to 2024. He is a member of the Democratic Party.

Shah was the Democratic candidate for U.S. Congress in Arizona's 1st congressional district in the 2024 election, losing to incumbent Republican David Schweikert. He was again nominated in Arizona's 1st congressional district in the 2026 election and faced former NFL kicker Jay Feely in the general election. Shah is described as a moderate Democrat.

== Early life and education ==
Amish Mahendra Shah was born and raised in Chicago, Illinois. His Gujarati parents immigrated from India in the 1960s while pursuing degrees in engineering. His father is Jain while his mother is Hindu. He attended Northwestern University, where he earned a Bachelor of Arts degree in economics. Shah attended Northwestern's Feinberg School of Medicine, where he received his Doctor of Medicine degree. Later, he went to the UC Berkeley School of Public Health, earning a Master of Public Health degree.

== Medical career ==
After his master's degree, Shah completed his medical internship at Sound Shore Medical Center in New Rochelle, New York, and his residency in emergency medicine at the Lincoln Medical and Mental Health Center in the Bronx, New York City. He became a faculty member and academic researcher at Mount Sinai Medical Center. While at Mount Sinai, he conducted a quality-improvement research project aimed at improving player safety across the National Football League.

During his time in New York, he also worked as a team physician for the New York Jets for five seasons. He then moved to Arizona for a sports medicine fellowship at the University of Arizona. He subsequently served as the chief medical officer of Urgent Consult. As of 2023, Shah is an emergency physician at the Mayo Clinic Arizona.

Shah became involved in politics after attending a meeting in Scottsdale, where he was encouraged to participate in a state legislative campaign. He was introduced to Eric Meyer, an emergency physician and the Arizona House minority leader, who invited Shah to campaign for him by going door to door.

== Arizona House of Representatives ==
=== First term (2019–2020) ===
Shah on the day of his swearing in at the Arizona State Capitol in 2019

In 2018, Shah entered the Democratic primary to represent Arizona's 24th legislative district, which includes parts of Phoenix and Scottsdale. As a newcomer, he faced incumbent Representative Ken Clark. The other incumbent for the 24th District, Lela Alston, decided to run for the state Senate. Alston and Clark chose to support John Glenn to fill Alston's open seat. Shah and another newcomer, Jennifer Longdon, defeated Clark, Glenn, and others to advance to the general election. In the general election, Shah and Longdon were elected, defeating David Alger.

Shah was sworn into office on January 14. During his first term, he introduced legislation covering vehicle registration fees, healthcare, and animal welfare. In 2019, he introduced legislation that would calculate Arizona's vehicle registration fee based on a vehicle's value rather than using a fixed rate for all vehicles. In 2020, he introduced legislation requiring medical insurance companies to use standardized forms for prior-authorization requests. He also introduced legislation to repeal the state preemption of local regulation of pet dealers.

=== Second term (2021–2022) ===
In 2020, Shah and Longdon won the 24th District's Democratic primary. In the general election the pair defeated Robyn Cushman and David Alger to win re-election.

During his second term, Shah focused on health care and sponsored legislation which would restrict the ability of emergency medical technicians to discourage patients from seeking hospital transportation. He also sponsored legislation that would repeal specific consent requirements for HIV testing and legislation that would enable physician peer support. In 2022, he sponsored legislation that would ban late-night fireworks and the declawing of cats.

=== Third term (2023–2024) ===
Lupe Contreras, Amish Shah, and Marcelino Quinonez in the Arizona House of Representatives in 2023

After the 2022 redistricting in Arizona was completed, Shah's home legislative district was changed from District 24 to District 5. Fellow District 24 incumbent Jennifer Longdon and District 28 incumbent Sarah Liguori were also placed in the new District 5, which includes central Phoenix and parts of north and east Phoenix. The representatives also faced activist Brianna Westbrook and Phoenix Union High School District Governing Board member Aaron Márquez in the district's Democratic primary. Shah and Longdon prevailed in the primary, defeating Liguori, Westbrook, and Márquez. Shah and Longdon won the general election.

During his third term, Shah introduced legislation covering health care and education. In 2023, he introduced legislation that would allow families of incarcerated people to obtain their medical records. He also introduced legislation which would provide free college for the children of first responders and military personnel who died by suicide following work-related post-traumatic stress. He proposed a bill to provide health-insurance subsidies to eligible teachers with dependents to help retain teachers.

=== Committee assignments ===
Shah served on the House Health and Human Services Committee during his three terms in office and was the committee's ranking member during his final term. He also served while in office on the Regulatory Affairs, Transportation, Ways and Means, and Appropriations committees.

== Congressional campaigns ==
=== 2024 ===
Arizona's 1st congressional district since 2023

Shah announced his intention to run for U.S. Congress in Arizona's 1st congressional district, in the 2024 elections on April 3, 2023. He resigned from the Arizona House in February 2024 to focus on his campaign. The district encompassed the affluent areas of northeast Phoenix, Scottsdale, Fountain Hills, and Paradise Valley in Maricopa County.

He narrowly won the Democratic nomination in a six-candidate primary with 23% of the vote compared to 21% for both former state Democratic Party Chairman Andrei Cherny and former newscaster Marlene Galán-Woods, 18% for investment banker Conor O'Callaghan, and 12% for orthodontist Andrew Horne. He lost to Republican incumbent David Schweikert in the November 2024 general election by a 52% to 48% margin.

=== 2026 ===
In May 2025, Shah announced that he would again be running for Congress in Arizona's 1st congressional district in the 2026 election. He won the Democratic nomination on July 21, 2026, defeating Marlene Galán-Woods, who was backed by the Democratic Congressional Campaign Committee in the Democratic primary. Shah will face former NFL kicker Jay Feely, who is running as a Republican, in the general election. Shah and Feely previously worked together for the New York Jets, where their careers overlapped during the 2008 and 2009 seasons.

== Political positions ==
Shah is described as a moderate Democrat. During his tenure in the Arizona Legislature, he had a reputation for working across the aisle.

=== Healthcare ===
In 2019, when speaking at a healthcare panel, Shah advocated for a "universal, single-payer" Medicare for All program and added that this policy position led him to support Bernie Sanders for president in 2020. For his 2026 campaign, Shah supports a public option that would allow people to buy into Medicare, rather than a single-payer system.

=== Border security ===
Shah supports securing the US-Mexico border. He initially voted against the 2022 state budget that established the Arizona Border Security Fund, citing inadequate education funding, but voted in 2023 for a bipartisan budget that included $200 million for border security and increased education funding.

== Personal life ==
Shah lives in Phoenix, Arizona. In 2021, he treated a woman experiencing anaphylaxis reaction while a passenger aboard a flight from Washington, D.C., to Phoenix that made an emergency landing in Albuquerque, New Mexico.

== Electoral history ==
=== 2018 ===
Arizona House of Representatives 24th District Democratic Primary Election, 2018
Party	Candidate	Votes	%
Democratic	Amish Shah	10,820	28.5%
Democratic	Jennifer Longdon	8,041	21.2%
Democratic	Ken Clark (incumbent)	6,890	18.2%
Democratic	Denise Link	3,605	9.5%
Democratic	Marcus Ferrell	3,402	9.0%
Democratic	John Glenn	3,377	8.9%
Democratic	Fred Dominguez	1,730	4.6%
-	Write-In	67	0.2%
Majority		37,932	100%

Arizona House of Representatives 24th District Election, 2018
Party	Candidate	Votes	%
Democratic	Jennifer Longdon	40,520	40.9%
Democratic	Amish Shah	39,363	39.7%
Republican	David Alger, Sr.	18,853	19.0%
-	Write-In	351	0.4%
Majority		99,087	100%

=== 2020 ===
Arizona House of Representatives 24th District Democratic Primary Election, 2020
Party	Candidate	Votes	%
Democratic	Jennifer Longdon (incumbent)	21,932	50.3%
Democratic	Amish Shah (incumbent)	21,547	49.4%
-	Write-In	117	0.3%
Majority		43,596	100%

Arizona House of Representatives 24th District Election, 2020
Party	Candidate	Votes	%
Democratic	Amish Shah (incumbent)	61,639	35.9%
Democratic	Jennifer Longdon (incumbent)	60,233	35.1%
Republican	Robyn Cushman	26,099	15.2%
Republican	David Alger Sr.	23,548	13.7%
-	Write-In	170	0.1%
Majority		171,689	100%

=== 2022 ===
Arizona House of Representatives 5th District Democratic Primary, 2022
Party	Candidate	Votes	%
Democratic	Amish Shah (incumbent)	15,629	31.8%
Democratic	Jennifer Longdon (incumbent)	11,956	24.4%
Democratic	Sarah Liguori (incumbent)	9,104	18.6%
Democratic	Brianna Westbrook	7,181	14.6%
Democratic	Aaron Márquez	5,213	10.6%
Majority		49,083	100%

Arizona House of Representatives 5th District Election, 2022
Party	Candidate	Votes	%
Democratic	Amish Shah (incumbent)	49,006	40.2%
Democratic	Jennifer Longdon (incumbent)	48,436	39.7%
Republican	Jennifer "Jenn" Treadwell	24,262	19.9%
-	Write-In	302	0.2%
Majority		122,006	100%

=== 2024 ===
United States House of Representatives Arizona’s 1st Congressional District Democratic Primary, 2024
Party	Candidate	Votes	%
Democratic	Amish Shah	17,214	23.5%
Democratic	Andrei Cherny	15,596	21.3%
Democratic	Marlene Galán-Woods	15,490	21.2%
Democratic	Conor O’Callaghan	13,539	18.5%
Democratic	Andrew Horne	8,991	12.3%
Democratic	Kurt Kroemer	2,356	3.2%
Majority		73,186	100%

United States House of Representatives Arizona’s 1st Congressional District, 2024
Party	Candidate	Votes	%
Republican	David Schweikert (incumbent)	225,538	51.9%
Democratic	Amish Shah	208,966	48.1%
Majority		434,504	100%

U.S. House of Representatives
Preceded by David Schweikert	Member-elect of the U.S. House of Representatives from Arizona's 1st congressional district Taking office 2027	Elect
