= Brianna Westbrook =

American political activist

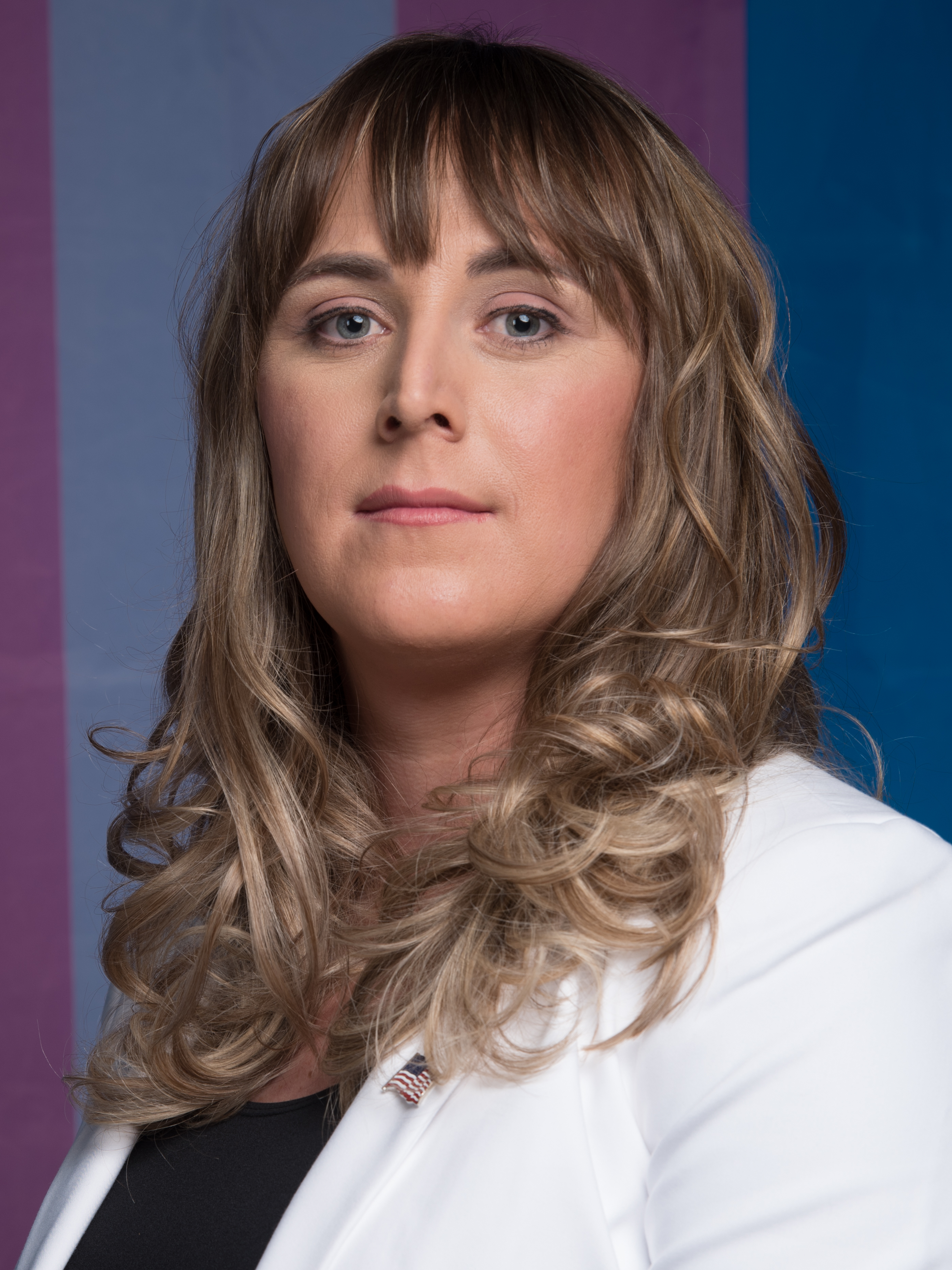
- Born: November 24, 1984 (age 41); Mesa, Arizona, U.S.
- Occupation: Politician
- Term: 3
- Political party: Democratic
- Movement: Anti-war, Black Lives Matter, Environmental justice, Immigrant rights, LGBTQ rights, Reproductive justice, Transgender rights
- Children: 1
- Website: westbrookforarizona.com

Brianna Westbrook (born November 24, 1984) is an American transgender rights activist who is a vice-chair of the Arizona Democratic Party and employed as a consultant for a Phoenix-valley area based technology company. A former political director of Equality Arizona, she is the first transgender person to be elected as a vice-chair of a state Democratic Party. She ran as a Justice Democrat in the Arizona's 8th congressional district special election primary following the resignation of Trent Franks in 2018. In 2020, she was elected as the Democratic Socialists of America's Southwest Regional Co-chair for the Immigrants Rights Working Group steering committee.

== Early life ==
Westbrook was born in Mesa, Arizona, in 1984. Following the divorces of her grandmother, aunt, and mother, her family moved to Tennessee, then Montana and Washington state. After her mother remarried, Brianna moved out and became involved in documenting street races, at one point also convincing a Spokane-area racetrack to provide a safe track for teens to race cars in.

While in Spokane, she met her now ex-wife. At age 19 Westbrook had a daughter, and she was working in construction to support the new family. At 22, she returned to Arizona and worked in car sales, becoming a sales manager at Arrowhead Honda in Peoria, Arizona, northwest of Phoenix. While working at Arrowhead Honda, Westbrook began her transition, documenting it through YouTube, where her now-deleted channel once had several thousand subscribers. Shortly after coming out as transgender, she also became an activist, advocating for LGBT and disability protections and protesting the passing of AZ SB 1432 in the state legislature.

== Candidacy in Arizona's 8th U.S. congressional district special election primary ==
Westbrook began her foray into electoral politics in response to the rise of Donald Trump's 2016 presidential campaign, announcing she would run against Republican incumbent Trent Franks in the US congressional midterm election in 2018, before learning of his resignation. The news of Franks's resignation following his sexual harassment scandal led to a rise in media attention of the subsequent special election, which gave Westbrook, running to become what would have been the first transgender representative of in the US Congress, support from national figures such as Rosie O'Donnell and Chelsea Manning

Although Franks's seat had been historically ignored by Democratic contenders, Westbrook was joined in the Democratic primary election by physician Hiral Tipirneni. Public high school teacher Gene Scharer, who ran against Franks in 2012, had intended to join Westbrook and Tipirneni in the primary, but fell hundreds of signatures short and did not qualify to run. The signatures for both Scharer and Westbrook's campaigns were challenged in court by a supporter of Tipirneni's campaign, but only Scharer was disqualified as Westbrook exceeded the number of valid signatures needed to qualify.

Westbrook's campaign collected endorsements from Our Revolution, Run With Pride, Justice Democrats and the Phoenix chapter of the Democratic Socialists of America by unanimous vote. When she received a candidate endorsement application from the National Rifle Association (NRA), she responded by recording herself tearing the form in half. Westbrook was not endorsed by the NRA.

The February 27, 2018, special election primary ended with Tipirneni taking 60.2% of the Democratic vote and Westbrook taking 39.7%. After losing the primary, Westbrook actively supported her former competitor's run for the special election as she began a campaign for the Arizona Senate's 22nd district, sharing a mutual agreement with Tipirneni to support one another's campaigns. During her candidacy for Arizona Senate, Westbrook was endorsed by the Arizona State AFL–CIO, the Southwest Regional Council of Carpenters, and Our Revolution.

Westbrook's primary election challenger, Tipirneni, ultimately lost the special election to Republican Debbie Lesko by 4.8 percentage points. Westbrook's candidacy in the Arizona Senate's 22nd district election primary for the state legislature was contested and won by radio announcer Wendy Garcia, who subsequently lost to Republican David Livingston in the general election by 26.6 percentage points.

== 2022 Arizona legislature campaign ==
In 2022, Westbrook launched a campaign for Arizona's 5th legislative district, representing central Phoenix and neighborhoods in its periphery, competing for one of two seats with incumbents Jennifer Longdon, Amish Shah, Sarah Liguori as well as new challenger Aaron Marquez. Westbrook's campaign was endorsed by Planned Parenthood Advocates of Arizona, LUCHA, Working Families Party, Stonewall Democratic Club, Alexandria Ocasio-Cortez's Courage to Change, Everytown for Gun Safety, AEA Fund for Public Education and Lead Locally. Voter Choice Arizona, a 501c(3) organization, could not endorse political candidates for public office, but listed Westbrook as a candidate who supports Ranked Choice Voting. Westbrook, Liguori, and Marquez lost the election. The election was won by incumbents Shah and Longdon, the latter of whom received $53,000 in campaign funding from Arizona Progress Fund, a dark money PAC.

After Jennifer Longdon and Shah's resignations from the state legislature, Westbrook was nominated by members of the elected precinct committee of Arizona Legislative District 5 among a slate of other candidates to fill in Longdon and Shah's seats. The Maricopa County Board of Supervisors ultimately chose to nominate Sarah Liguori as Logndon's replacement, and following that, Charles Lucking to fill Shah's seat.

== Activism and organizing ==
During the 2018–2019 education workers' strikes in the United States, Westbrook and Kathy Hoffman, a Glendale school teacher who would later be elected as the Arizona Superintendent of Public Instruction, organized a GoFundMe fundraising campaign to benefit hourly workers at schools who would not be paid while schools are closed, including bus drivers, classroom aides and cafeteria workers, raising $5,060 in total.

In October 2018, Westbrook, along with other activists, took part in a protest against the nomination of Brett Kavanaugh to the Supreme Court at the office of US Senator Jeff Flake. Westbrook and three other women were subsequently arrested. During Westbrook's arrest, she was initially held with her fellow protestors, but was later placed in isolation overnight.

Westbrook was a co-organizer of the 2019 Women's March in Phoenix, the third to happen in the city, which brought thousands to the Arizona capitol in January of that year to highlight a wide range of social issues, including better representation for women in congress.

On Christmas Day, 2020, Westbrook and other housing rights activists spent the day standing outside Governor Doug Ducey's estate to advocate for rent and utility forgiveness for Arizonans facing eviction during the COVID-19 pandemic.

In June 2021, Westbrook organized a petition and open letter to US Senator Kyrsten Sinema calling on her to end her defense of the filibuster in the United States Senate in order to ensure the passage of the Equality Act (United States), as well as the George Floyd Justice in Policing Act.

Following the enactment of two Arizona legislature bills, S.B. 1138, which bans some gender-affirming services for transgender youth, and S.B. 1165, which adds restrictions on transgender students participating in school sports, Westbrook advocated for the relocation of the Super Bowl LVII from Arizona. The NFL had previously stated that it would "stand with LGBTQ+ people this month and yearlong with a commitment to our players, our fans and our staff to live proudly and authentically," and Westbrook argued that if the NFL aims to keep its promise, it should move the Super Bowl out of Arizona as a gesture of solidarity with trans youth in Arizona, and as a protest against legislation aiming to restrict some forms of voter accessibility.

In response to a number of state legislature bills targeting drag performances, Westbrook participated in a protest organized by Trans Queer Pueblo, Equality Arizona, and Radical Women Phoenix, leading at chant at the Arizona state capitol.

== Bernie Sanders 2020 Presidential Campaign ==
Westbrook endorsed U.S. Senator Bernie Sanders's 2020 campaign for President of the United States of America and was a national surrogate for the Bernie Sanders for President 2020 campaign.

Previously in 2018, Sanders had also credited Westbrook for running for public office, writing about her campaign, "As I have said many times, elections are not going to be won unless there is excitement on the ground, unless ordinary people become involved."

In February 2020, Westbrook, along with Cynthia Nixon and others participated in a campaign kick-off event for a canvass in Henderson, Nevada.

Later, on March 7, 2020, the Bernie Sanders for President 2020 campaign announced that Westbrook was an Arizona state co-chair.

== Political views ==
Westbrook is a Justice Democrat, and advocates for a number of key positions of its platform, including debt-free college and "Medicare for All".

=== Healthcare ===
Westbrook is an advocate for a single-payer healthcare system, commonly referred to as "Medicare for All". Although she concedes that the Affordable Care Act was "a step in the right direction in many regards," she advocates for full implementation of a single-payer system that aims to guarantee universal low-cost medical services for all Americans. As part of the platform for her campaign for the Arizona State Senate, she proposed expanding the Arizona Health Care Cost Containment System (AHCCCS) to accommodate funding for the state's KidsCar and ALTCS programs. Westbrook also holds a non-negotiable stance on access to women's health care, stating she would "refuse to support legislation which would limit women's access to low-cost birth control, preventive screenings, procedures, and treatment, just to make sure that women also have no access to safe abortions."

=== Environment ===
Westbrook has acknowledged that global warming is real and caused by human activity. She supports Tulsi Gabbard's Off Fossil Fuels for a Better Future Act, which proposes ending fossil fuel subsidies, fully transitioning to clean energy sources for electrical generation, and requiring all new vehicle sales to be zero-emissions vehicles by 2035. She also advocates for policies which would invest in green technologies, such as solar and wind to increase their affordability as well as promoting tax incentives for transitioning to renewable energy sources. Her campaign for the Arizona State Senate advocated for the adoption of eco-friendly construction techniques and minimizing water usage. As Arizona Democratic Party Vice Chair, Westbrook co-sponsored a resolution in support of the Green New Deal, which has become adopted as part of the state party platform. Lead Locally added Westbrook's 2022 Arizona legislature campaign to their Green New Deal slate, soon after the US Supreme Court's West Virginia v. EPA ruling.

=== Minimum wage ===
Westbrook supports a transition to a national minimum wage of $15 per hour over a ten-year period, adjusted for inflation over time.

=== Labor rights ===
Westbrook is an advocate of union representation and a supporter of the Protecting the Right to Organize Act, which would build on existing labor laws to bolster the right of employees to join a labor union.

=== Campaign finance reform ===
Westbrook supports amending the United States Constitution to nullify the Supreme Court's Citizens United v. FEC ruling.

=== Automatic voter registration ===
Westbrook is a supporter of automatic voter registration.

=== Ranked choice voting ===
Westbook is a supporter of ranked choice voting.

=== Police surveillance ===
In February 2022, the Phoenix City Council authorized the purchase of aerial surveillance drones for the Phoenix Police Department. Westbook joined city council members Carlos Garcia, Sal DiCiccio and several Phoenix residents in voicing concerns around the lack of regulation and oversight in the use of the drones, stating that they "should be subject to independent public audits."

=== Abortion rights ===
Westbrook is pro-choice, and opposed to Arizona's statewide ban on abortion. She emphasizes intersectionality on her perspective on abortion rights, warning that police violence would ultimately be used to enforce the ban, and disproportionately effect low-income people and communities of color. Westbrook's 2022 campaign for the Arizona House of Representatives 5th legislative district was endorsed by Planned Parenthood Advocates for Arizona, along with Sarah Liguori.

=== Student debt cancellation ===
President Joe Biden's plan for partial student debt cancellation is supported by Westbrook, although she supports expanding its scope to cancel all student debt. Additionally she supports universal access to free higher education, stating that an educated population is more resilient against manipulation, and sees right-wing efforts to take control of school boards and reduce funding to education as a fundamental threat to democracy.

=== Housing Access ===
Westbrook supports the City of Phoenix's ordinance to ban source of income discrimination, being quoted as saying that it "helps those living with disabilities, veterans, young adults, children aging out of the foster system, and many people in my community living with HIV and AIDS." After being nominated as part of a slate of candidates to replace Jennifer Longdon's seat after Longdon's resignation from the state legislature, Westbrook stated that, if appointed, a focus of her work would be on addressing housing, homelessness, and access to mental care for people struggling with addiction.

== See also ==
- List of transgender public officeholders in the United States
