= PODER PAC =

PODER PAC is an American Democratic Party political action committee (PAC) founded in 2008 in Orlando, Florida. Its goal is to increase and support pro-choice Latinas running for all levels of elected office.

In 2008, it supported Hillary Clinton for the Democratic Party nomination for president.

In 2016, its mission changed to exclusively electing Latinas to the US Congress. and hosted a fundraiser in Philadelphia with Loretta Sanchez for California's US Senate election.

In 2020, Mike Bloomberg gave $500,000 to the group in an effort to win the 2020 United States presidential election in Florida for Joe Biden.

After Roe v. Wade was overturned in June 2022, the group said it was imperative to support more pro-choice Latinos for Congress. It said that the decision may help elect more candidates.

The group has supported 90% of Democratic Latinas in the 117th United States Congress. In 2022 it launched the Poderosas 2022 Protection Program to support pro choice Latina incumbents.
