= Jennifer Longdon =

American politician

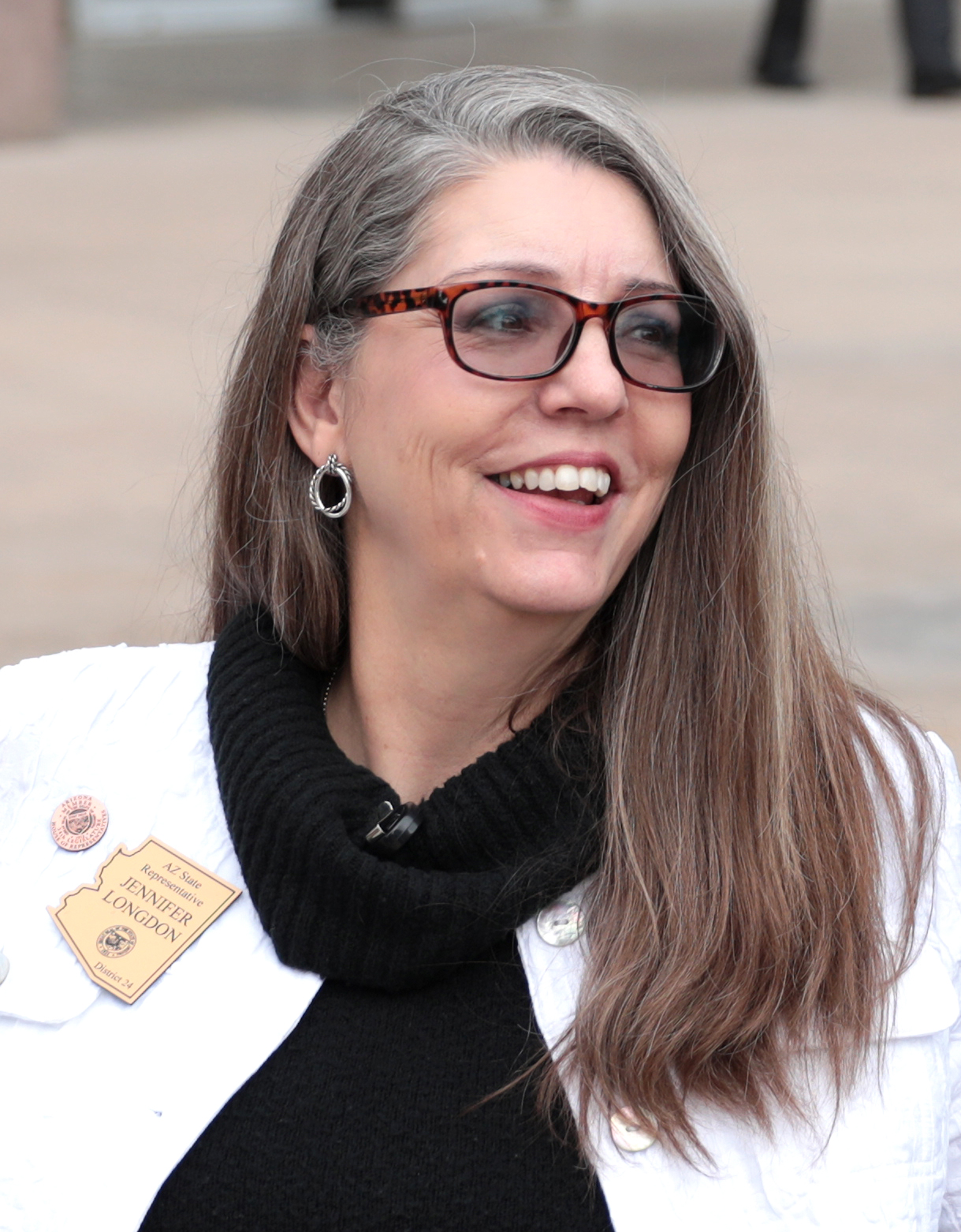
- Longdon in 2019

Member of the Arizona House of Representatives from the 5th district
- In office January 9, 2023 – January 26, 2024 Serving with Amish Shah
- Preceded by: Leo Biasiucci
- Succeeded by: Sarah Liguori

Member of the Arizona House of Representatives from the 24th district
- In office January 14, 2019 – January 9, 2023 Serving with Amish Shah
- Preceded by: Lela Alston
- Succeeded by: Lydia Hernandez

Personal details
- Party: Democratic
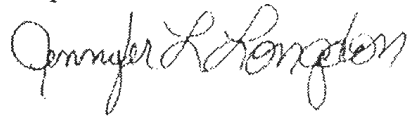
- Signature

Jennifer Longdon is an American politician and a former Democratic member of the Arizona House of Representatives representing District 5 from 2023 to 2024. She previously represented District 24 from 2019 to 2023. Longdon was elected in 2018 to succeed State Representative Lela Alston, who instead ran for State Senate.

In January 2024, Longdon resigned from the Arizona House to work on healthcare policy at a nonprofit organization.

Longdon was paralyzed in 2004 in a random drive-by shooting. She served on the Phoenix Mayor's Commission on Disability Issues, on the advisory board of Christopher and Dana Reeve Foundation Public Impact Panel, and as president of Arizonans for Gun Safety.

== Michael Bloomberg's 2020 presidential campaign ==
In 2020, Longdon endorsed Michael Bloomberg's campaign for president, and volunteered in canvassing efforts in her home district. In January that year, Longdon's state legislature campaign manager Amber Rivera resigned and joined the Michael Bloomberg 2020 presidential campaign.
