= Arizona's 5th legislative district =

American legislative district

- Map of District 5: Approved January 21, 2022
- Senator: Lela Alston (D)
- House members: Sarah Liguori (D); Aaron Márquez (D)
- Registration: 41.88% Democratic; 21.85% Republican; 34.35% Other
- Demographics: 48% White; 7% Black/African American; 3% Native American; 4% Asian; 36% Hispanic
- Population: 239,088
- Voting-age population: 192,005
- Registered voters: 126,361

Arizona's 5th legislative district is one of 30 legislative districts in the U.S. state of Arizona. It encompasses a portion of Maricopa County, including part of the city of Phoenix.

The district is represented in the 57th Arizona State Legislature by Lela Alston in the Arizona Senate and Sarah Liguori and Aaron Márquez in the Arizona House of Representatives, all Democrats.

According to the Arizona Independent Redistricting Commission (AIRC), District 5 leans Democratic and is considered non-competitive. Following the 2020 United States census, the district had a total population of 239,088.

== Political representation ==
The district is represented in the 56th Arizona State Legislature, which convenes from January 1, 2023, to December 31, 2024, by Lela Alston (D-Phoenix) in the Arizona Senate and by Sarah Liguori (D-Phoenix) and Charles Lucking (D-Phoenix) in the Arizona House of Representatives.

Liguori and Lucking were appointed in February 2024 to replace resigned members Jennifer Longdon and Amish Shah, respectively.

Name	Image	Residence	Office	Party
Lela Alston		Phoenix	State senator	Democrat
Sarah Liguori		Phoenix	State representative	Democrat
Aaron Márquez		Phoenix	State representative	Democrat

== Election results ==
The 2022 elections were the first in the newly drawn district.

=== Arizona Senate ===
2022 Arizona's 5th Senate district election
Party	Candidate	Votes	%
Democratic	Lela Alston (incumbent)	56,142	70.75
Republican	Jeff Silvey	23,214	29.25
Total votes		79,356	100
Democratic hold			

=== Arizona House of Representatives ===
2022 Arizona House of Representatives election, 5th district
Party	Candidate	Votes	%
Democratic	Amish Shah (incumbent)	49,006	40.27
Democratic	Jennifer Longdon (incumbent)	48,436	39.80
Republican	Jennifer Treadwell	24,262	19.94
Total votes		121,704	100.00
Democratic hold			
Democratic hold			

== See also ==
- List of Arizona legislative districts
- Arizona State Legislature
