= Sarah Liguori =

American politician (born 1983)

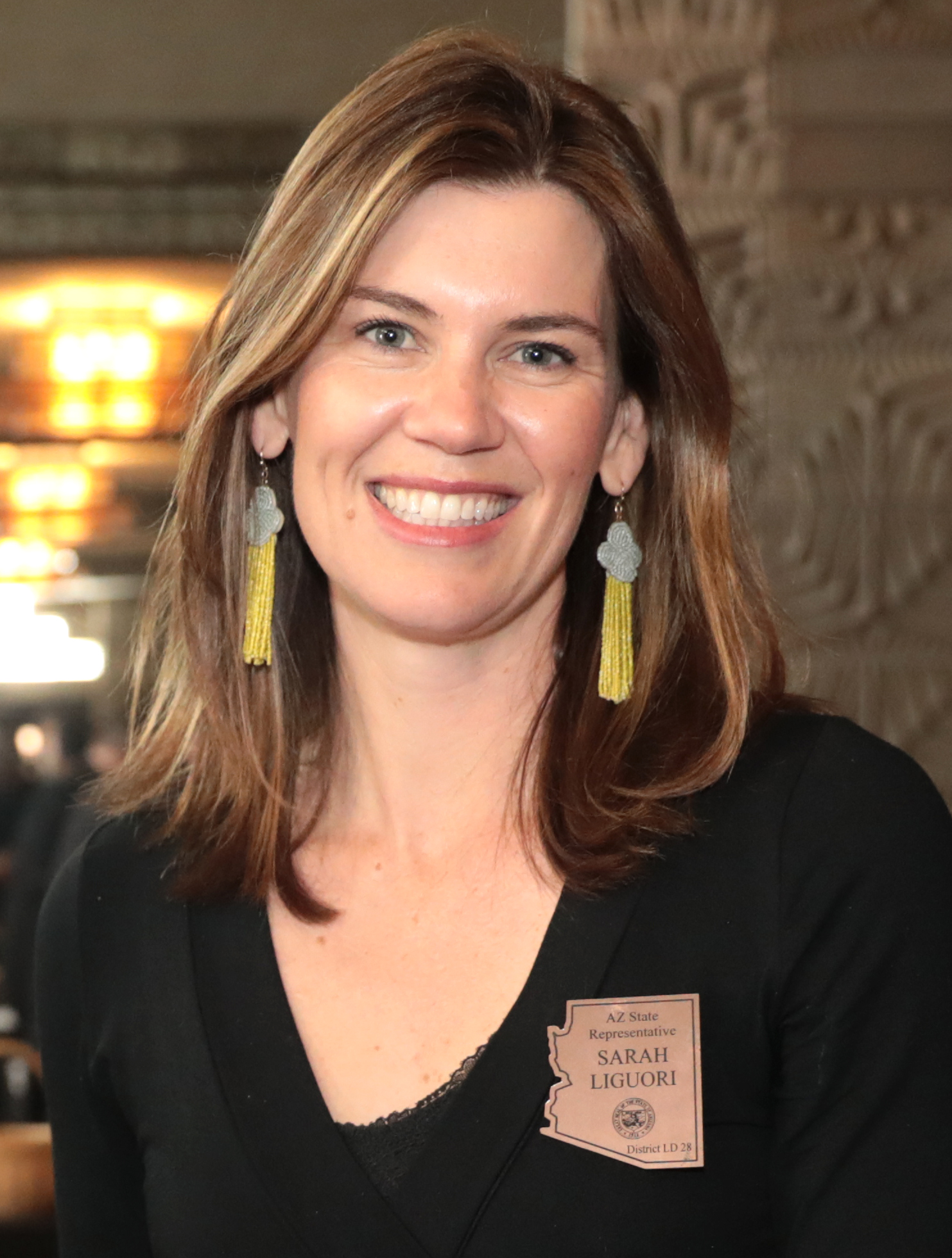
- Liguori in 2022

Member of the Arizona House of Representatives from the 5th district
- Incumbent
- Assumed office February 8, 2024 Serving with Aaron Márquez
- Preceded by: Jennifer Longdon

Member of the Arizona House of Representatives from the 28th district
- In office October 26, 2021 – January 9, 2023 Serving with Kelli Butler
- Preceded by: Aaron Lieberman
- Succeeded by: Beverly Pingerelli

Personal details
- Born: 1983 (age 42–43) Tucson, Arizona, U.S.
- Party: Democratic
- Spouse(s): Andrew Liguori, DO
- Children: 2
- Education: University of Arizona; Lorenzo di Medici University

Sarah Liguori (born 1983) is an American politician who is a member of the Arizona House of Representatives from the 5th legislative district. She previously served as a member from the 28th legislative district from 2021 to 2023. She was originally appointed to the House after incumbent Representative Aaron Lieberman resigned to run for governor. She is a member of the Democratic Party.

Liguori was born in Tucson, and went to the University of Arizona, in addition to studying international business at the Lorenzo di Medici University in Florence, Italy.

== 2022 Arizona legislature campaign ==
In 2022, Liguori launched a campaign to keep her seat in the Arizona House of Representatives, competing for one of two seats representing the state's 5th legislative district. Liguori's campaign was endorsed by Planned Parenthood Advocates of Arizona, alongside Arizona Democratic Party Vice Chair Brianna Westbrook, who was also competing for a seat in the same legislature and district. She lost reelection.

== Second term in legislature ==
In February 2024, Ligouri was again appointed to the Arizona House, this time replacing Jennifer Longdon in the 5th legislative district.
