= 2020 United States House of Representatives elections in Arizona =

- November 3, 2020

All 9 Arizona seats to the United States House of Representatives
	Majority party	Minority party
Party	Democratic	Republican
Last election	5	4
Seats won	5	4
Seat change	Steady	Steady
Popular vote	1,629,318	1,638,516
Percentage	49.85%	50.13%
Swing	▼0.52%	▲1.46%

Democratic
50–60%
60–70%
70–80%
Republican
50–60%
60–70%
70–80%

The 2020 United States House of Representatives elections in Arizona were held on November 3, 2020, to elect the nine U.S. representatives from the state of Arizona, one from each of the state's nine congressional districts. The elections coincided with the 2020 U.S. presidential election, as well as other elections to the House of Representatives, elections to the United States Senate, and various state and local elections.

This election was the first time since 1990 in which no third-party candidates appeared on the ballot in the House of Representatives elections.

Arizona was one of two states in which the party that won the state's popular vote did not win a majority of seats in 2020, the other state being North Carolina.

== Overview ==
=== Statewide ===
Party	Candidates	Votes		Seats		
Party	Candidates	No.	%	No.	+/–	%
Republican	9	1,638,516	50.13	4	Steady	44.44
Democratic	9	1,629,318	49.85	5	Steady	55.56
Write-in	5	415	0.01	0	Steady	0.0
Total	23	3,268,249	100.0	9	Steady	100.0

Popular vote
Republican	50.13%
Democratic	49.85%
Other	0.01%

House seats
Democratic	55.56%
Republican	44.44%

=== By district ===
Results of the 2020 United States House of Representatives elections in Arizona by district:

District	Democratic		Republican		Others		Total		Result
District	Votes	%	Votes	%	Votes	%	Votes	%	Result
District 1	188,469	51.61%	176,709	48.39%	0	0.00%	365,178	100.0%	Democratic hold
District 2	209,945	55.10%	170,975	44.87%	134	0.04%	381,054	100.0%	Democratic hold
District 3	174,243	64.57%	95,594	35.43%	0	0.00%	269,837	100.0%	Democratic hold
District 4	120,484	30.23%	278,002	69.74%	137	0.04%	398,623	100.0%	Republican hold
District 5	183,171	41.10%	262,414	58.88%	72	0.02%	445,657	100.0%	Republican hold
District 6	199,644	47.83%	217,783	52.17%	0	0.00%	417,427	100.0%	Republican hold
District 7	165,452	76.69%	50,226	23.28%	54	0.03%	215,732	100.0%	Democratic hold
District 8	170,816	40.43%	251,633	59.56%	18	0.00%	422,467	100.0%	Republican hold
District 9	217,094	61.63%	135,180	38.37%	0	0.00%	352,274	100.0%	Democratic hold
Total	1,629,318	49.85%	1,638,516	50.13%	415	0.01%	3,268,249	100.0%	

== District 1 ==
2020 Arizona's 1st congressional district election
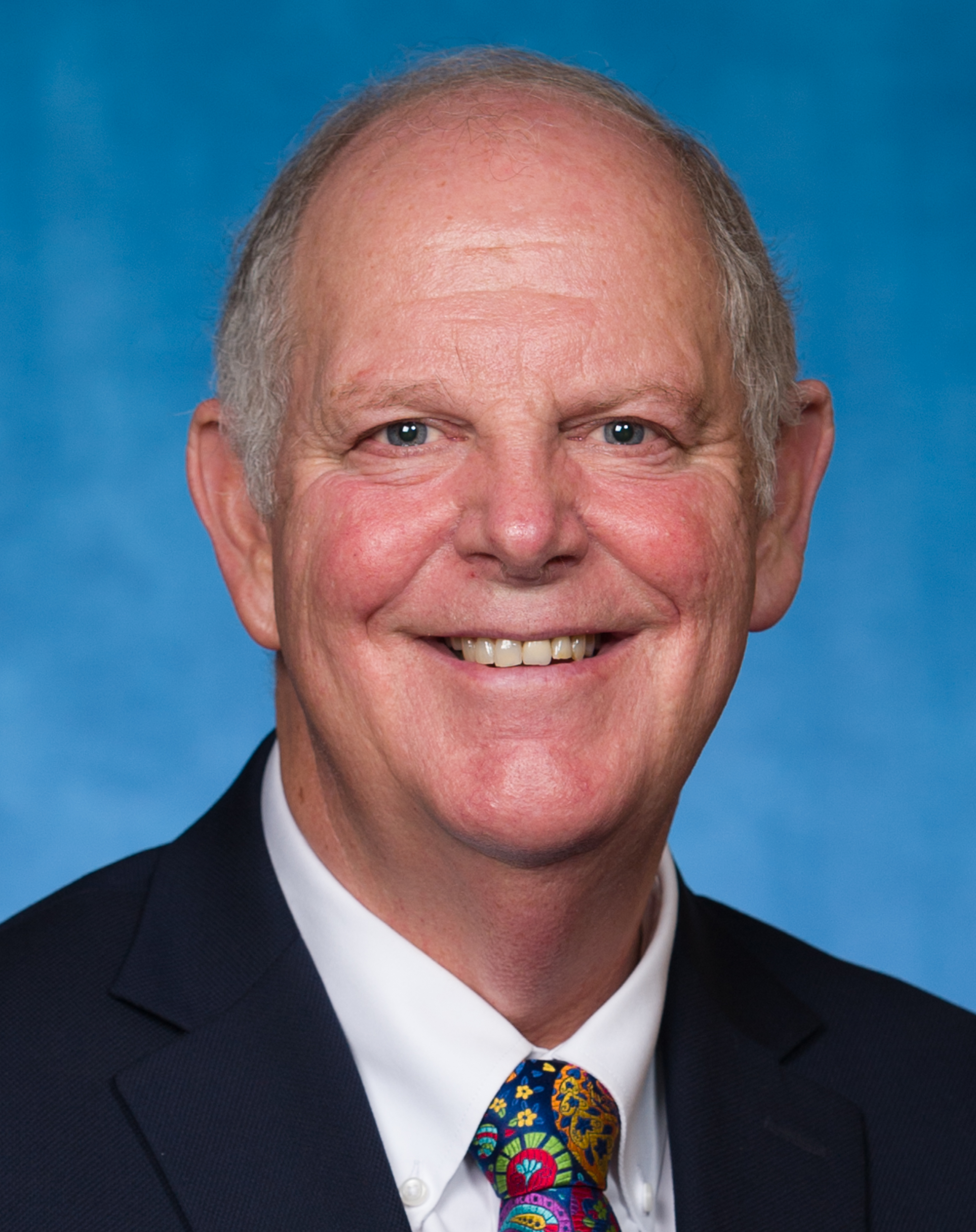

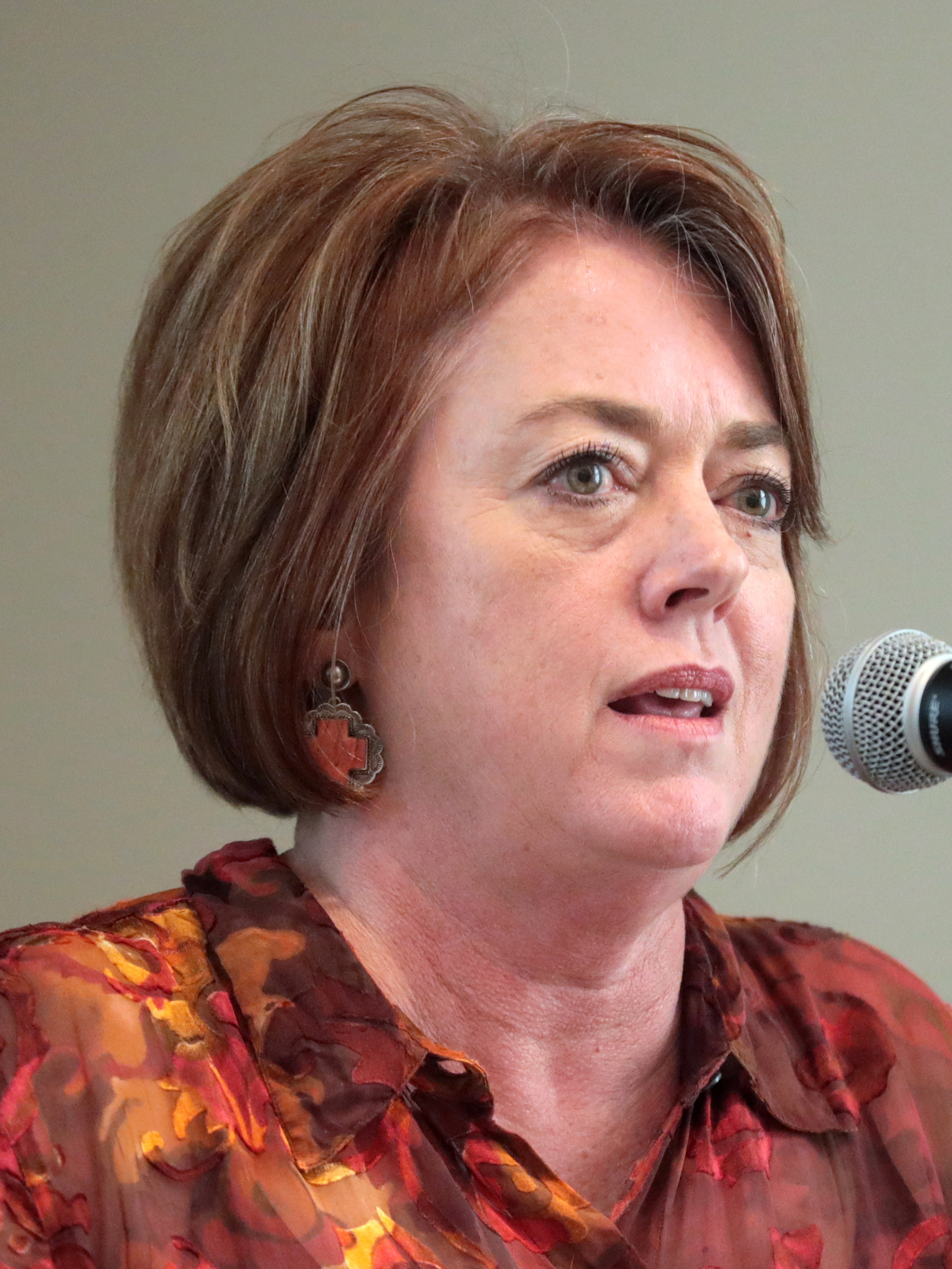
Nominee	Tom O'Halleran	Tiffany Shedd
Party	Democratic	Republican
Popular vote	188,469	176,709
Percentage	51.6%	48.4%
- Shedd: 50–60% 60–70% 70–80% 80–90% >90% O'Halleran: 50–60% 60–70% 70–80% 80–90% >90% Tie: 50% No votes
U.S. Representative before election
Tom O'Halleran
Democratic
Elected U.S. Representative
Tom O'Halleran
Democratic

The 1st district is based in the northeastern part of the state, encompassing the Phoenix and Tucson metropolitan areas, taking in Casa Grande, Maricopa, Oro Valley, and Marana. The district also includes the Navajo Nation, Hopi Reservation, and Gila River Indian Community. Incumbent Democrat Tom O'Halleran, who had represented the district since 2017, ran for re-election. He was re-elected with 53.8% of the vote in 2018. The district had a PVI of R+2.

=== Democratic primary ===
==== Candidates ====
===== Nominee =====
- Tom O'Halleran, incumbent U.S. representative

===== Eliminated in primary =====
- Eva Putzova, former Flagstaff city council member

===== Withdrawn =====
- Barbara McGuire, former state senator
- Larry Williams, retail worker

==== Endorsements ====
Tom O'Halleran

Organizations

- End Citizens United
- High School Democrats of America
- Human Rights Campaign
- Jewish Democratic Council of America
- League of Conservation Voters Action Fund
- NARAL Pro-Choice America
- Planned Parenthood Action Fund
Eva Putzova

Organizations

- Brand New Congress
- Climate Strike – Arizona
- Friends of the Earth Action
- National Women's Political Caucus (NWPC)
- Our Revolution
- Our Revolution Flagstaff Chapter
- Peace Action
- Progressive Democrats of America
- Sunrise Movement – Flagstaff chapter

Individuals

- Marianne Williamson, author and 2020 Democratic presidential candidate

==== Primary results ====
Results by county: O'Halleran: 50–60%; 60–70%; 70–80%; Putzova: 50–60%

Democratic primary results
Party	Candidate	Votes	%
Democratic	Tom O'Halleran (incumbent)	47,083	58.6
Democratic	Eva Putzova	33,248	41.4
Total votes		80,331	100.0

=== Republican primary ===
==== Candidates ====
===== Nominee =====
- Tiffany Shedd, attorney, small business owner, firearms instructor and candidate for this seat in 2018

===== Eliminated in primary =====
- Nolan Reidhead, attorney

===== Withdrawn =====
- John Moore, mayor of Williams
- Doyel Shamley, former Apache County supervisor
- Chris Taylor, Safford city councilman (endorsed Reidhead)

===== Declined =====
- Curt Schilling, former Major League Baseball pitcher for Arizona Diamondbacks and Boston Red Sox

==== Endorsements ====
Tiffany Shedd

Federal officials

- Jon Kyl, former U.S. senator from Arizona (1995–2013, 2018)
- Kevin McCarthy, minority leader of the United States House of Representatives

Organizations

- Susan B. Anthony List

==== Primary results ====
Results by county: Shedd: 50–60%; 60–70%; 70–80%; Reidhead: 50–60%; 70–80%

Republican primary results
Party	Candidate	Votes	%
Republican	Tiffany Shedd	40,310	54.7
Republican	Nolan Reidhead	33,418	45.3
Total votes		73,728	100.0

=== General election ===
==== Debate ====
2022 Arizona's 1st congressional district debate
No.	Date	Host	Moderator	Link	Democratic	Republican
Key: P Participant A Absent N Not invited I Invited W Withdrawn						
Key: P Participant A Absent N Not invited I Invited W Withdrawn					Tom O'Halleran	Tiffany Shedd
1	Oct. 8, 2020	KAET; KJZZ (FM); The Arizona Republic	Steve Goldstein; Yvonne Wingett Sanchez; Ted Simons		P	P

==== Predictions ====
Source	Ranking	As of
The Cook Political Report	Lean D	November 2, 2020
Inside Elections	Likely D	October 28, 2020
Sabato's Crystal Ball	Likely D	November 2, 2020
Daily Kos	Lean D	November 2, 2020
RCP	Lean D	November 2, 2020
Decision Desk HQ	Likely D	November 3, 2020
538	Likely D	November 3, 2020
Elections Daily	Likely D	November 1, 2020
CNN	Likely D	November 1, 2020
Politico	Lean D	November 2, 2020
Niskanen	Safe D	June 7, 2020

==== Results ====
Arizona's 1st congressional district, 2020
Party	Candidate	Votes	%
Democratic	Tom O'Halleran (incumbent)	188,469	51.6
Republican	Tiffany Shedd	176,709	48.4
Total votes		365,178	100.0
Democratic hold			

== District 2 ==
2020 Arizona's 2nd congressional district election
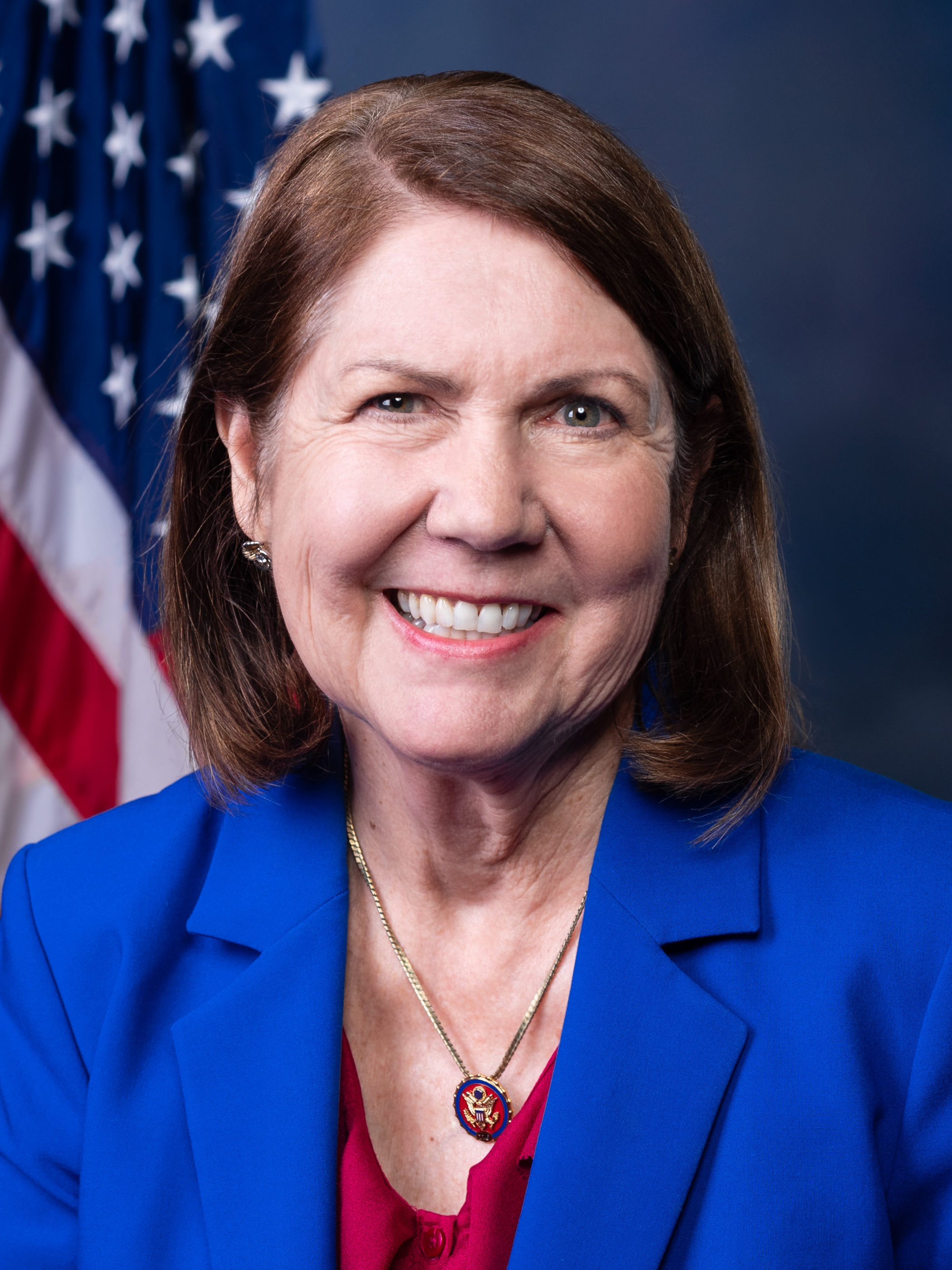

Nominee	Ann Kirkpatrick	Brandon Martin
Party	Democratic	Republican
Popular vote	209,945	170,975
Percentage	55.1%	44.9%
- Kirkpatrick: 50–60% 60–70% 70–80% 80–90% Martin: 50–60% 60–70% 70–80% Tie: 50% No votes
U.S. Representative before election
Ann Kirkpatrick
Democratic
Elected U.S. Representative
Ann Kirkpatrick
Democratic

The 2nd district is located in southeastern Arizona, encompassing the eastern Tucson area. Incumbent Democrat Ann Kirkpatrick, who had represented the district since, ran for re-election. She was re-elected with 54.7% of the vote in 2018. The district had a PVI of R+1.

=== Democratic primary ===
==== Candidates ====
===== Nominee =====
- Ann Kirkpatrick, incumbent U.S. representative

===== Eliminated in primary =====
- Peter Quilter, national security professional

==== Endorsements ====
Ann Kirkpatrick

Labor unions

- AFL–CIO
- American Federation of State, County and Municipal Employees
- American Physical Therapy Association
- American Society of Anesthesiologists
- International Brotherhood of Electrical Workers
- International Brotherhood of Teamsters – Joint Council 25
- UNITE HERE
- United Food and Commercial Workers

Organizations

- American Association for Justice
- American Crystal Sugar Company
- EMILY's List
- End Citizens United
- Giffords Law Center to Prevent Gun Violence
- Human Rights Campaign
- NARAL Pro-Choice America
- National Committee to Preserve Social Security and Medicare
- Planned Parenthood

Newspapers

- Arizona Daily Star
- The Arizona Republic

==== Primary results ====
Democratic primary results
Party	Candidate	Votes	%
Democratic	Ann Kirkpatrick (incumbent)	77,517	76.3
Democratic	Peter Quilter	24,035	23.7
Total votes		101,552	100.0

=== Republican primary ===
==== Candidates ====
===== Nominee =====
- Brandon Martin, U.S. Army veteran and candidate for this seat in 2018

===== Eliminated in primary =====
- Joseph Morgan, support technician
- Noran Ruden, businessman

===== Withdrawn =====
- Mike Ligon, author
- Shay Stautz, former lobbyist for University of Arizona
- Justine Wadsack, realtor and small business owner (running for state senate)

==== Primary results ====
Republican primary results
Party	Candidate	Votes	%
Republican	Brandon Martin	31,730	42.5
Republican	Noran Ruden	25,049	33.6
Republican	Joseph Morgan	17,802	23.8
Republican	Jordan Flayer (write-in)	52	0.1
Total votes		74,633	100.0

=== General election ===
==== Predictions ====
Source	Ranking	As of
The Cook Political Report	Safe D	November 2, 2020
Inside Elections	Safe D	October 28, 2020
Sabato's Crystal Ball	Safe D	November 2, 2020
Daily Kos	Safe D	November 2, 2020
RCP	Likely D	November 2, 2020
Decision Desk HQ	Safe D	November 3, 2020
538	Safe D	November 3, 2020
Elections Daily	Safe D	November 1, 2020
CNN	Safe D	November 1, 2020
Politico	Likely D	November 2, 2020
Niskanen	Safe D	June 7, 2020

==== Results ====
Arizona's 2nd congressional district, 2020
Party	Candidate	Votes	%
Democratic	Ann Kirkpatrick (incumbent)	209,945	55.1
Republican	Brandon Martin	170,975	44.9
Write-in		134	0.0
Total votes		381,054	100.0
Democratic hold			

== District 3 ==
2020 Arizona's 3rd congressional district election
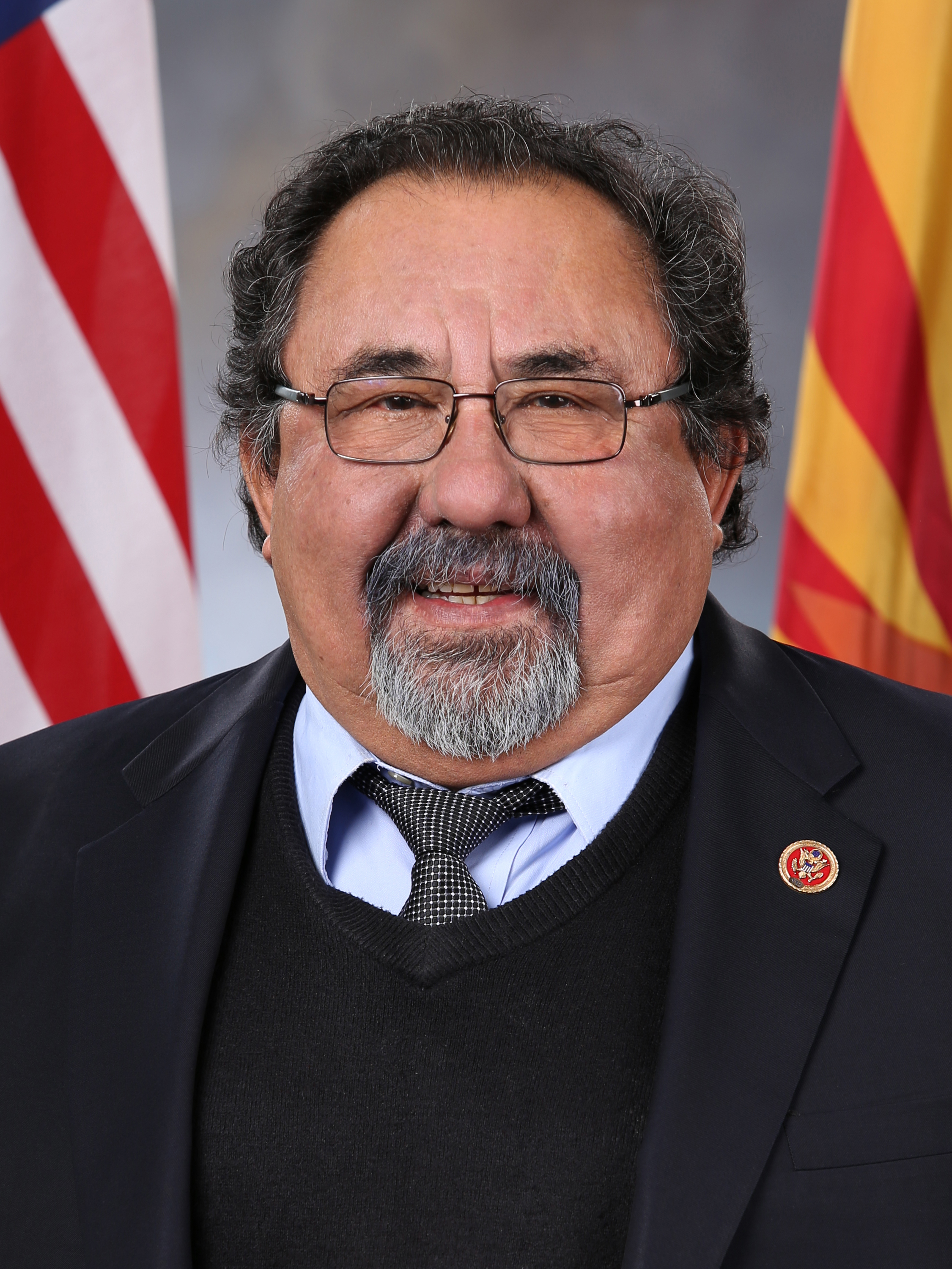

Nominee	Raúl Grijalva	Daniel Wood
Party	Democratic	Republican
Popular vote	174,243	95,594
Percentage	64.6%	35.4%
- Grijalva: 50–60% 60–70% 70–80% 80–90% >90% Wood: 50–60% 60–70% 70–80% 80–90% No votes
U.S. Representative before election
Raúl Grijalva
Democratic
Elected U.S. Representative
Raúl Grijalva
Democratic

The 3rd district encompasses southwestern Arizona, taking in Yuma, western Tucson, as well as stretching into the western suburbs of Phoenix, including Goodyear, Avondale, southern Buckeye, and a small portion of West Phoenix. Incumbent Democrat Raúl Grijalva, who was first elected to Congress in 2002, ran for re-election. He was re-elected with 63.9% of the vote in 2018. The district had a PVI of D+13.

=== Democratic primary ===
==== Candidates ====
===== Nominee =====
- Raúl Grijalva, incumbent U.S. representative

==== Primary results ====
Democratic primary results
Party	Candidate	Votes	%
Democratic	Raúl Grijalva (incumbent)	63,282	100.0
Total votes		63,282	100.0

=== Republican primary ===
==== Candidates ====
===== Nominee =====
- Daniel Wood, U.S. Marine Corps veteran

===== Withdrawn =====
- Steve Ronnebeck, former auto mechanic

==== Primary results ====
Republican primary results
Party	Candidate	Votes	%
Republican	Daniel Wood	29,260	99.8
Republican	Richard Jolley (write-in)	44	0.2
Total votes		29,304	100.0

=== General election ===
==== Predictions ====
Source	Ranking	As of
The Cook Political Report	Safe D	November 2, 2020
Inside Elections	Safe D	October 28, 2020
Sabato's Crystal Ball	Safe D	November 2, 2020
Daily Kos	Safe D	November 2, 2020
RCP	Safe D	November 2, 2020
Decision Desk HQ	Safe D	November 3, 2020
538	Safe D	November 3, 2020
Elections Daily	Safe D	November 1, 2020
CNN	Safe D	November 1, 2020
Politico	Safe D	November 2, 2020
Niskanen	Safe D	June 7, 2020

==== Results ====
Arizona's 3rd congressional district, 2020
Party	Candidate	Votes	%
Democratic	Raúl Grijalva (incumbent)	174,243	64.6
Republican	Daniel Wood	95,594	35.4
Total votes		269,837	100.0
Democratic hold			

== District 4 ==
2020 Arizona's 4th congressional district election
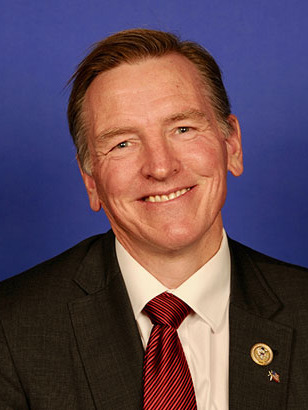

Nominee	Paul Gosar	Delina DiSanto
Party	Republican	Democratic
Popular vote	278,002	120,484
Percentage	69.7%	30.2%
- Gosar: 50–60% 60–70% 70–80% 80–90% >90% DiSanto: 50–60% 60–70% No votes
U.S. Representative before election
Paul Gosar
Republican
Elected U.S. Representative
Paul Gosar
Republican

The 4th district is located in north-central Arizona, taking in Lake Havasu City, Prescott, and the Phoenix exurbs, including San Tan Valley, Apache Junction, and northern Buckeye. The incumbent was Republican Paul Gosar, who was re-elected with 68.2% of the vote in 2018.

=== Republican primary ===
==== Candidates ====
===== Nominee =====
- Paul Gosar, incumbent U.S. representative

===== Eliminated in primary =====
- Anne Marie Ward, former business consultant and former staffer to U.S. Senator Martha McSally

==== Primary results ====
Results by county: Gosar: 50–60%; 60–70%; 70–80%

Republican primary results
Party	Candidate	Votes	%
Republican	Paul Gosar (incumbent)	82,370	63.1
Republican	Anne Marie Ward	48,116	36.9
Total votes		130,486	100.0

=== Democratic primary ===
==== Candidates ====
===== Nominee =====
- Delina DiSanto, businesswoman and candidate for this seat in 2018

===== Eliminated in primary =====
- Stuart "Stu" Starky, nominee for U.S. Senate in 2004 and former school principal

==== Primary results ====
Democratic primary results
Party	Candidate	Votes	%
Democratic	Delina DiSanto	34,345	74.3
Democratic	Stu Starky	11,852	25.7
Total votes		46,197	100.0

=== General election ===
==== Predictions ====
Source	Ranking	As of
The Cook Political Report	Safe R	November 2, 2020
Inside Elections	Safe R	October 28, 2020
Sabato's Crystal Ball	Safe R	November 2, 2020
Daily Kos	Safe R	November 2, 2020
RCP	Safe R	November 2, 2020
Decision Desk HQ	Safe R	November 3, 2020
538	Safe R	November 3, 2020
Elections Daily	Safe R	November 1, 2020
CNN	Safe R	November 1, 2020
Politico	Safe R	November 2, 2020
Niskanen	Safe R	June 7, 2020

==== Results ====
Arizona's 4th congressional district, 2020
Party	Candidate	Votes	%
Republican	Paul Gosar (incumbent)	278,002	69.7
Democratic	Delina DiSanto	120,484	30.2
Write-in		137	0.0
Total votes		398,623	100.0
Republican hold			

== District 5 ==
2020 Arizona's 5th congressional district election
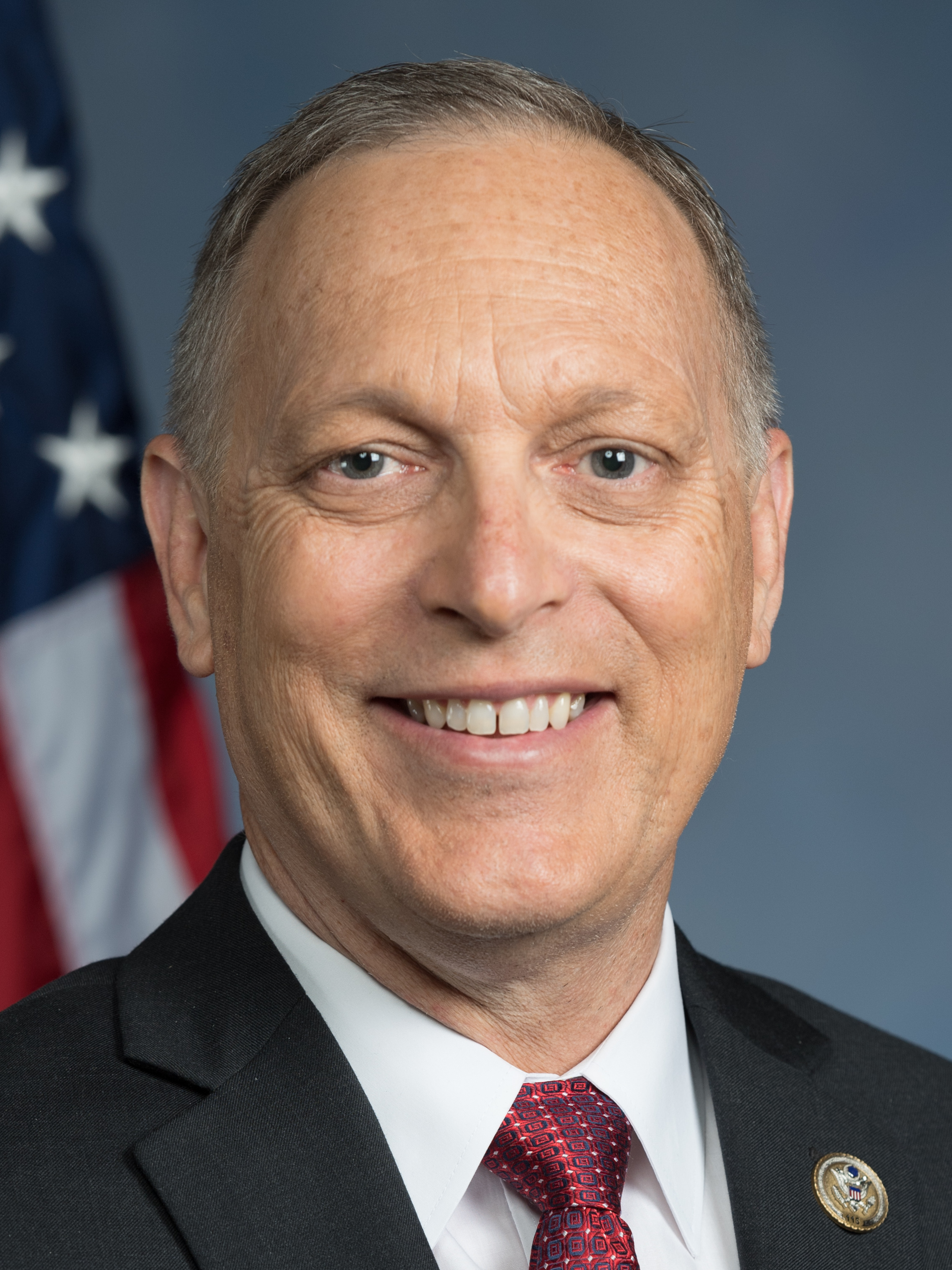

Nominee	Andy Biggs	Joan Greene
Party	Republican	Democratic
Popular vote	262,414	183,171
Percentage	58.9%	41.1%
- Precinct results Biggs: 50–60% 60–70% 70–80% Greene: 50–60% 60–70%
U.S. Representative before election
Andy Biggs
Republican
Elected U.S. Representative
Andy Biggs
Republican

The 5th district is centered around the eastern suburbs of Phoenix, including Gilbert, Queen Creek, southern and eastern Chandler, and eastern Mesa. The incumbent was Republican Andy Biggs, who was re-elected with 59.4% of the vote in 2018.

=== Republican primary ===
==== Candidates ====
===== Declared =====
- Andy Biggs, incumbent U.S. representative

==== Primary results ====
Republican primary results
Party	Candidate	Votes	%
Republican	Andy Biggs (incumbent)	104,888	99.6
Republican	Joe Vess (write-in)	465	0.4
Total votes		105,353	100.0

=== Democratic primary ===
==== Candidates ====
===== Declared =====
- Joan Greene, businesswoman and nominee for Arizona's 5th congressional district in 2018
- Jonathan Ireland, educator and musician
- Javier Ramos, attorney

==== Primary results ====
Democratic primary results
Party	Candidate	Votes	%
Democratic	Joan Greene	34,070	50.0
Democratic	Javier Ramos	26,818	39.4
Democratic	Jonathan Ireland	7,209	10.6
Total votes		68,097	100.0

=== General election ===
==== Predictions ====
Source	Ranking	As of
The Cook Political Report	Safe R	November 2, 2020
Inside Elections	Safe R	October 28, 2020
Sabato's Crystal Ball	Safe R	November 2, 2020
Daily Kos	Safe R	November 2, 2020
RCP	Safe R	November 2, 2020
Decision Desk HQ	Safe R	November 3, 2020
538	Safe R	November 3, 2020
Elections Daily	Safe R	November 1, 2020
CNN	Safe R	November 1, 2020
Politico	Safe R	November 2, 2020
Niskanen	Safe R	June 7, 2020

==== Results ====
Arizona's 5th congressional district, 2020
Party	Candidate	Votes	%
Republican	Andy Biggs (incumbent)	262,414	58.9
Democratic	Joan Greene	183,171	41.1
Write-in		72	0.0
Total votes		445,657	100.0
Republican hold			

== District 6 ==
2020 Arizona's 6th congressional district election
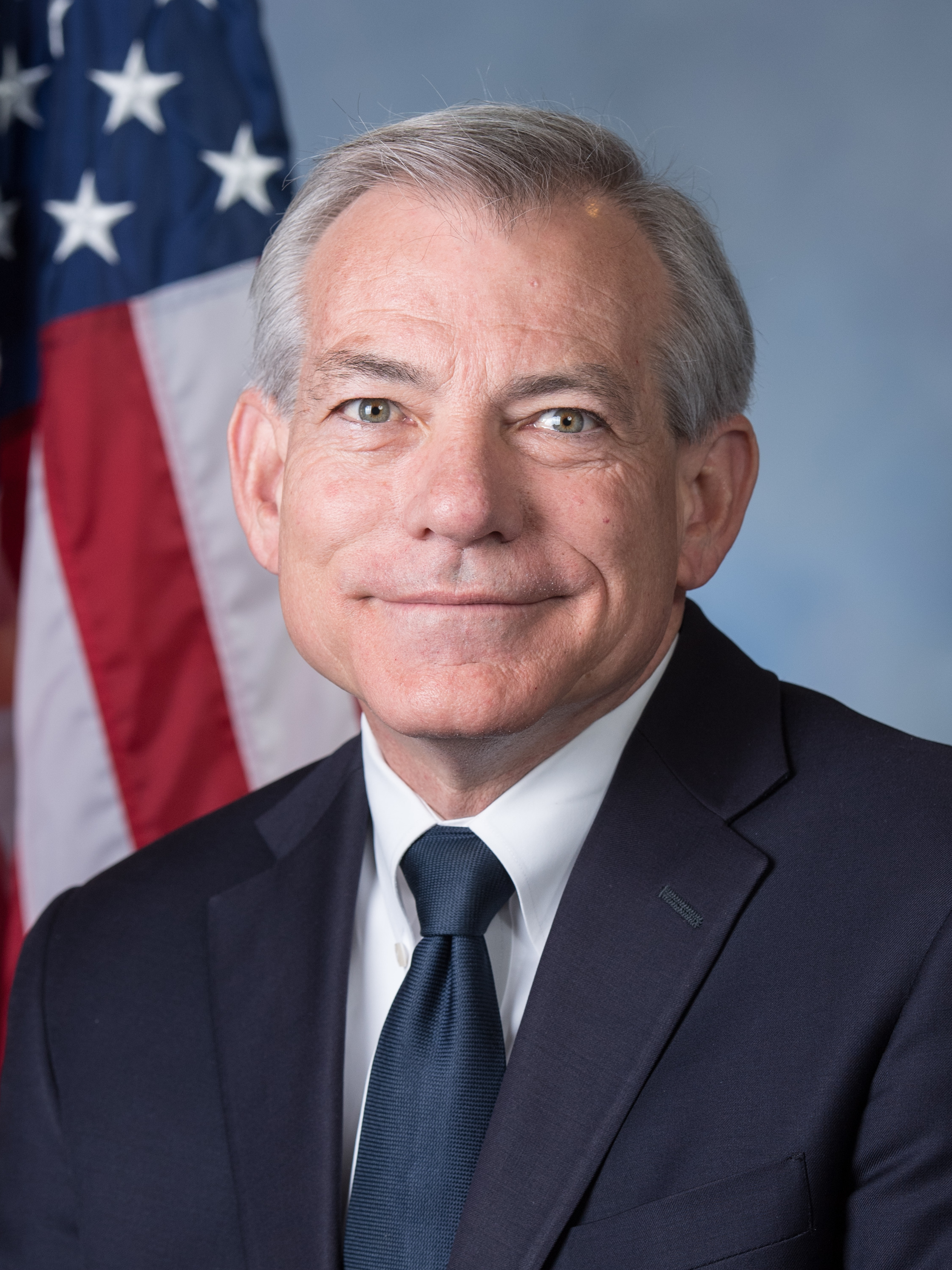

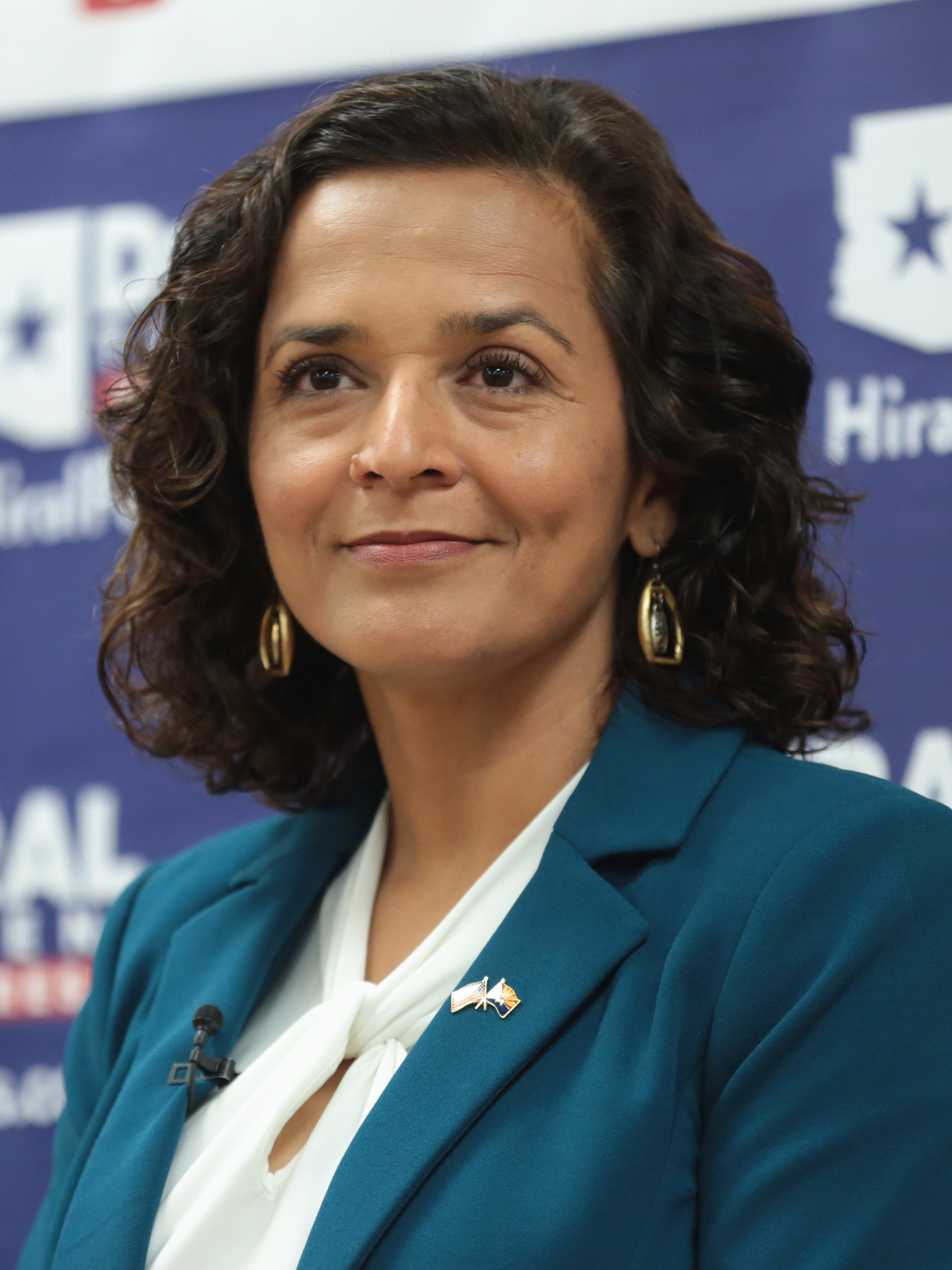
Nominee	David Schweikert	Hiral Tipirneni
Party	Republican	Democratic
Popular vote	217,783	199,644
Percentage	52.2%	47.8%
- Precinct results Schweikert: 50–60% 60–70% 70–80% Tipirneni: 50–60% 60–70% 70–80% No votes
U.S. Representative before election
David Schweikert
Republican
Elected U.S. Representative
David Schweikert
Republican

The 6th district covers parts of the northeastern suburbs of Phoenix, containing Scottsdale, Paradise Valley, Cave Creek, Fountain Hills, as well as a portion of North Phoenix, including Deer Valley and Desert View. The incumbent was Republican David Schweikert, who was re-elected with 55.2% of the vote in 2018.

=== Republican primary ===
==== Candidates ====
===== Declared =====
- David Schweikert, incumbent U.S. representative

==== Endorsements ====
David Schweikert

Organizations

- Club for Growth

==== Primary results ====
Republican primary results
Party	Candidate	Votes	%
Republican	David Schweikert (incumbent)	94,434	100.0
Total votes		94,434	100.0

=== Democratic primary ===
==== Candidates ====
===== Declared =====
- Karl Gentles, businessman
- Anita Malik, businesswoman, entrepreneur, and nominee for this seat in 2018
- Stephanie Rimmer, businesswoman
- Hiral Tipirneni, emergency room physician and nominee for Arizona's 8th congressional district in the 2018 special and general elections

==== Endorsements ====
Anita Malik

Organizations

- Peace Action
Hiral Tipirneni

Federal officials

- Ann Kirkpatrick, U.S. representative (AZ-02)
- Barack Obama, 44th president of the United States
- Tom O'Halleran, U.S. representative (AZ-01)

State officials

- Lela Alston, state senator and former state representative (2011–2019)
- Rich Andrade, state representative
- Charlene Fernandez, state representative and state House minority leader
- Randy Friese, state representative
- Robert Meza, state representative and former state senator (2011–2019) and state representative (2003–2011)
- Jamescita Peshlakai, state senator and former state representative (2013–2015)
- Martín Quezada, state senator and former state representative (2013–2015)
- Rebecca Rios, state senator and former state House minority leader (2017–2019), state representative (2015–2019), and state senator (2005–2011)
- Victoria Steele, state senator and former state representative (2013–2016)

Labor unions

- AFT Arizona
- Amalgamated Transit Union Local 1433
- Communication Workers of America Arizona State Council
- International Association of Sheet Metal, Air, Rail and Transportation Workers (SMART) Local 359
- International Brotherhood of Electrical Workers Local 640
- International Brotherhood of Teamsters Local 104
- International Union of Painters and Allied Trades
- United Food and Commercial Workers Local 99

Organizations

- 314 Action Fund
- AAPI Victory Fund
- Arizona Stonewall Democrats
- ASPIRE PAC
- Brady Campaign
- Congressional Hispanic Caucus (CHC) Bold PAC
- Elect AAPI
- EMILY's List
- End Citizens United
- Equality PAC
- Everytown for Gun Safety Action Fund
- High School Democrats of America
- Human Rights Campaign
- League of Conservation Voters Action Fund
- NARAL Pro-Choice America
- NewDem Action Fund
- Off the Sidelines PAC
- Planned Parenthood Action Fund
- Sierra Club

==== Polling ====
Poll source	Date(s) administered	Sample size (Note: Key: A – all adults RV – registered voters LV – likely voters V – unclear)	Margin of error	Karl Gentles	Anita Malik	Stephanie Rimmer	Hiral Tipirneni	Undecided
OH Predictive Insights	August 3, 2020	400 (LV)	± 4.9%	3%	30%	2%	53%	12%
Zogby Strategies (D) (Note: Poll conducted for Anita Malik)	August 28–30, 2019	400 (LV)	–	–	20%	12%	13%	55%

==== Primary results ====
Democratic primary results
Party	Candidate	Votes	%
Democratic	Hiral Tipirneni	42,538	53.2
Democratic	Anita Malik	29,218	36.5
Democratic	Stephanie Rimmer	4,592	5.7
Democratic	Karl Gentles	3,651	4.6
Total votes		79,999	100.0

=== General election ===
==== Predictions ====
Source	Ranking	As of
The Cook Political Report	Tossup	November 2, 2020
Inside Elections	Tossup	October 28, 2020
Sabato's Crystal Ball	Lean D (flip)	November 2, 2020
Daily Kos	Tossup	November 2, 2020
RCP	Lean R	November 2, 2020
Decision Desk HQ	Tossup	November 3, 2020
538	Tossup	November 3, 2020
Elections Daily	Lean R	November 1, 2020
CNN	Tossup	November 1, 2020
Politico	Tossup	November 2, 2020
Niskanen	Lean R	June 7, 2020

==== Polling ====
View source data.

Poll source	Date(s) administered	Sample size	Margin of error	David Schweikert (R)	Hiral Tipirneni (D)	Undecided
Public Policy Polling (D) (Note: Poll sponsored by 314 Action, which has endorsed Tipierneni prior to the sampling period.)	October 26–27, 2020	582 (LV)	–	41%	45%	–
OH Predictive Insights	September 23–27, 2020	531 (LV)	± 4.3%	49%	46%	5%
GQR Research (D) (Note: Poll sponsored by Tipirneni's campaign.)	September 23–26, 2020	500 (LV)	± 4.4%	45%	49%	6%
Public Policy Polling (D) (Note: Poll sponsored by the House Majority PAC.)	September 22–23, 2020	527 (V)	–	45%	43%	12%
GQR Research (D)	August 6–12, 2020	548 (LV)	± 4.2%	45%	48%	–
DCCC Targeting & Analytics Department (D) (Note: Poll sponsored by the DCCC)	July 29 – August 1, 2020	586 (LV)	± 4.0%	46%	43%	–

Hypothetical polling

with Generic Republican and Generic Democrat

Poll source	Date(s) administered	Sample size	Margin of error	Generic Republican	Generic Democrat	Undecided
PPP	September 22–23, 2020	527 (V)	–	48%	47%	5%

==== Results ====
Arizona's 6th congressional district, 2020
Party	Candidate	Votes	%
Republican	David Schweikert (incumbent)	217,783	52.2
Democratic	Hiral Tipirneni	199,644	47.8
Total votes		417,427	100.0
Republican hold			

== District 7 ==
2020 Arizona's 7th congressional district election
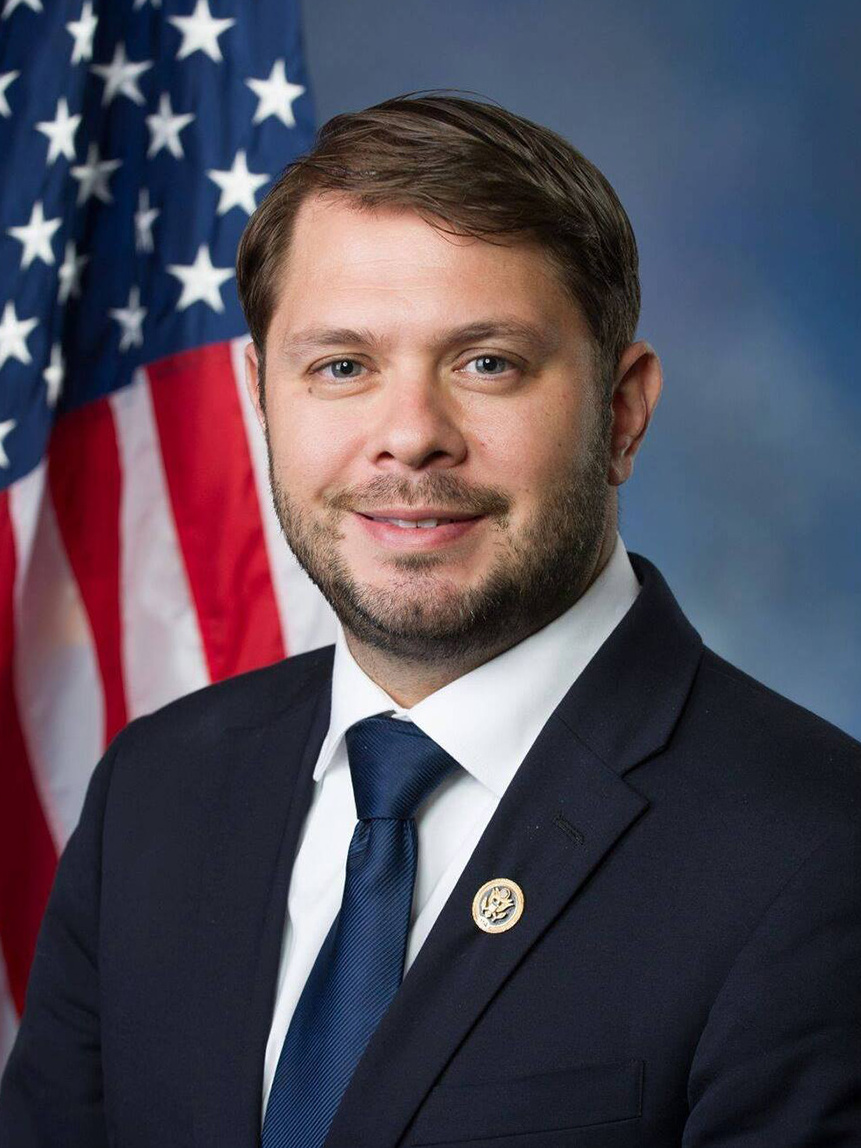

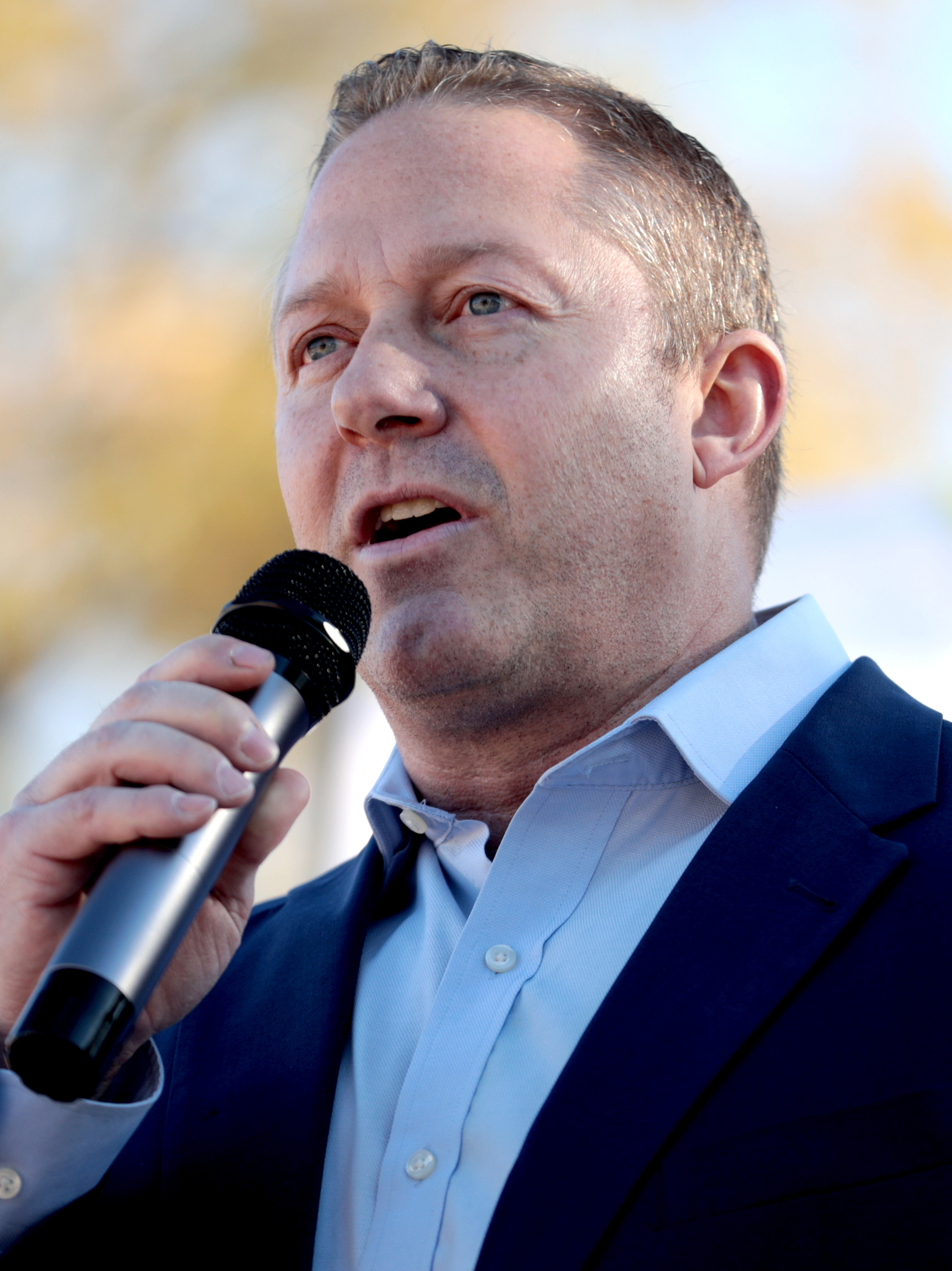
Nominee	Ruben Gallego	Josh Barnett
Party	Democratic	Republican
Popular vote	165,452	50,226
Percentage	76.7%	23.3%
- Precinct results Gallego: 50–60% 60–70% 70–80% 80–90% >90% Barnett: 50–60% Tie: 50% No votes
U.S. Representative before election
Ruben Gallego
Democratic
Elected U.S. Representative
Ruben Gallego
Democratic

The 7th district encompasses Downtown Phoenix and western Phoenix, including the urban villages of Maryvale, Estrella, Laveen, South Mountain, Central City, Encanto, and Alhambra, as well as Tolleson and southern Glendale. The incumbent was Democrat Ruben Gallego, who was re-elected with 85.6% of the vote in 2018 without major-party opposition.

=== Democratic primary ===
==== Candidates ====
===== Declared =====
- Ruben Gallego, incumbent U.S. representative

==== Primary results ====
Democratic primary results
Party	Candidate	Votes	%
Democratic	Ruben Gallego (incumbent)	56,037	100.0
Total votes		56,037	100.0

=== Republican primary ===
==== Candidates ====
===== Declared =====
- Josh Barnett, entrepreneur

==== Primary results ====
Republican primary results
Party	Candidate	Votes	%
Republican	Josh Barnett	15,223	100.0
Total votes		15,223	100.0

=== General election ===
==== Predictions ====
Source	Ranking	As of
The Cook Political Report	Safe D	November 2, 2020
Inside Elections	Safe D	October 28, 2020
Sabato's Crystal Ball	Safe D	November 2, 2020
Daily Kos	Safe D	November 2, 2020
RCP	Safe D	November 2, 2020
Decision Desk HQ	Safe D	November 3, 2020
538	Safe D	November 3, 2020
Elections Daily	Safe D	November 1, 2020
CNN	Safe D	November 1, 2020
Politico	Safe D	November 2, 2020
Niskanen	Safe D	June 7, 2020

==== Results ====
Arizona's 7th congressional district, 2020
Party	Candidate	Votes	%
Democratic	Ruben Gallego (incumbent)	165,452	76.7
Republican	Josh Barnett	50,226	23.3
Write-in		54	0.0
Total votes		215,732	100.0
Democratic hold			

== District 8 ==
2020 Arizona's 8th congressional district election
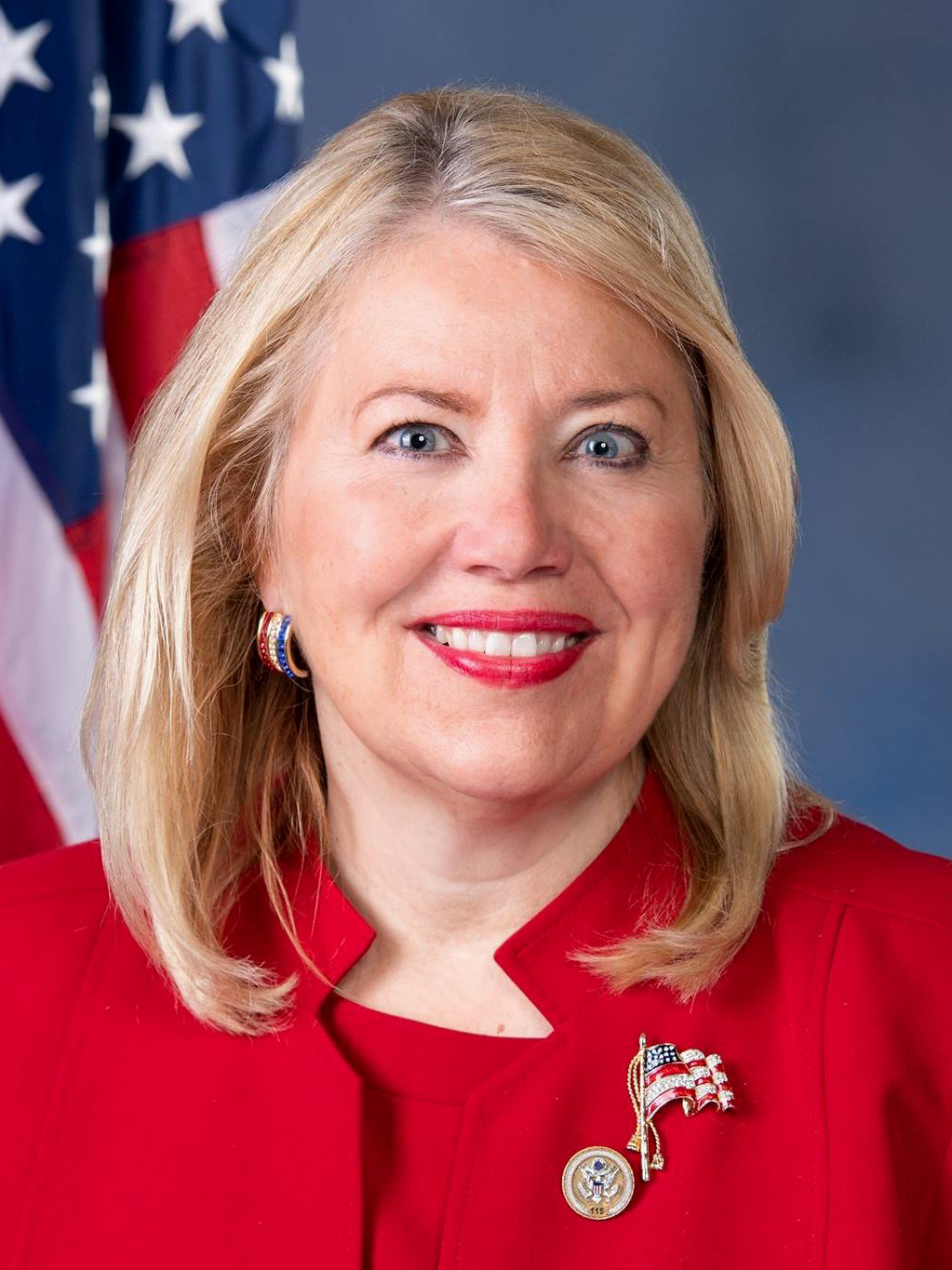

Nominee	Debbie Lesko	Michael Muscato
Party	Republican	Democratic
Popular vote	251,633	170,816
Percentage	59.6%	40.4%
- Precinct results Lesko: 50–60% 60–70% 70–80% Muscato: 50–60% 60–70% No votes
U.S. Representative before election
Debbie Lesko
Republican
Elected U.S. Representative
Debbie Lesko
Republican

The 8th district encompasses the western and northwestern suburbs of Phoenix, taking in Surprise, Peoria, Litchfield Park, Anthem, northern Glendale, and parts of North Phoenix, including North Gateway and Rio Vista. The incumbent was Republican Debbie Lesko, who was re-elected with 55.5% of the vote in 2018.

=== Republican primary ===
==== Candidates ====
===== Declared =====
- Debbie Lesko, incumbent U.S. representative

==== Endorsements ====
Debbie Lesko

Organizations

- 60 Plus Association
- American Conservative Union
- Center for Arizona Policy
- Concerned Women for America
- Freedom Caucus
- Maggie's List
- National Federation of Independent Business
- National Right to Life Committee
- RightNOW Women
- Susan B. Anthony List
- United States Chamber of Commerce

==== Primary results ====
Republican primary results
Party	Candidate	Votes	%
Republican	Debbie Lesko (incumbent)	105,630	100.0
Total votes		105,630	100.0

=== Democratic primary ===
==== Candidates ====
===== Declared =====
- Michael Muscato, gym owner
- Bob Musselwhite, former Litchfield Park city manager and councilman
- Bob Olsen, attorney

===== Declined =====
- Hiral Tipirneni, physician and nominee for Arizona's 8th congressional district in 2018 (running for Arizona's 6th congressional district)

==== Endorsements ====
Michael Muscato

Organizations

- Sierra Club

Labor unions

- American Federation of State, County and Municipal Employees – Local 2384
- Communications Workers of America
Bob Olsen

Organizations

- Democracy for America
- Stonewall Democrats of Arizona

Labor unions

- American Federation of State, County and Municipal Employees – Locals 2384 and 3282
- International Brotherhood of Electrical Workers – Local 266

==== Primary results ====
Democratic primary results
Party	Candidate	Votes	%
Democratic	Michael Muscato	35,898	54.3
Democratic	Bob Olsen	20,534	31.1
Democratic	Bob Musselwhite	9,575	14.5
Democratic	Kyle Martin (write-in)	45	0.1
Total votes		66,052	100.0

=== General election ===
==== Predictions ====
Source	Ranking	As of
The Cook Political Report	Safe R	November 2, 2020
Inside Elections	Safe R	October 28, 2020
Sabato's Crystal Ball	Safe R	November 2, 2020
Daily Kos	Safe R	November 2, 2020
RCP	Safe R	November 2, 2020
Decision Desk HQ	Safe R	November 3, 2020
538	Safe R	November 3, 2020
Elections Daily	Safe R	November 1, 2020
CNN	Safe R	November 1, 2020
Politico	Likely R	November 2, 2020
Niskanen	Safe R	June 7, 2020

==== Results ====
Arizona's 8th congressional district, 2020
Party	Candidate	Votes	%
Republican	Debbie Lesko (incumbent)	251,633	59.6
Democratic	Michael Muscato	170,816	40.4
Write-in		18	0.0
Total votes		422,467	100.0
Republican hold			

== District 9 ==
2020 Arizona's 9th congressional district election
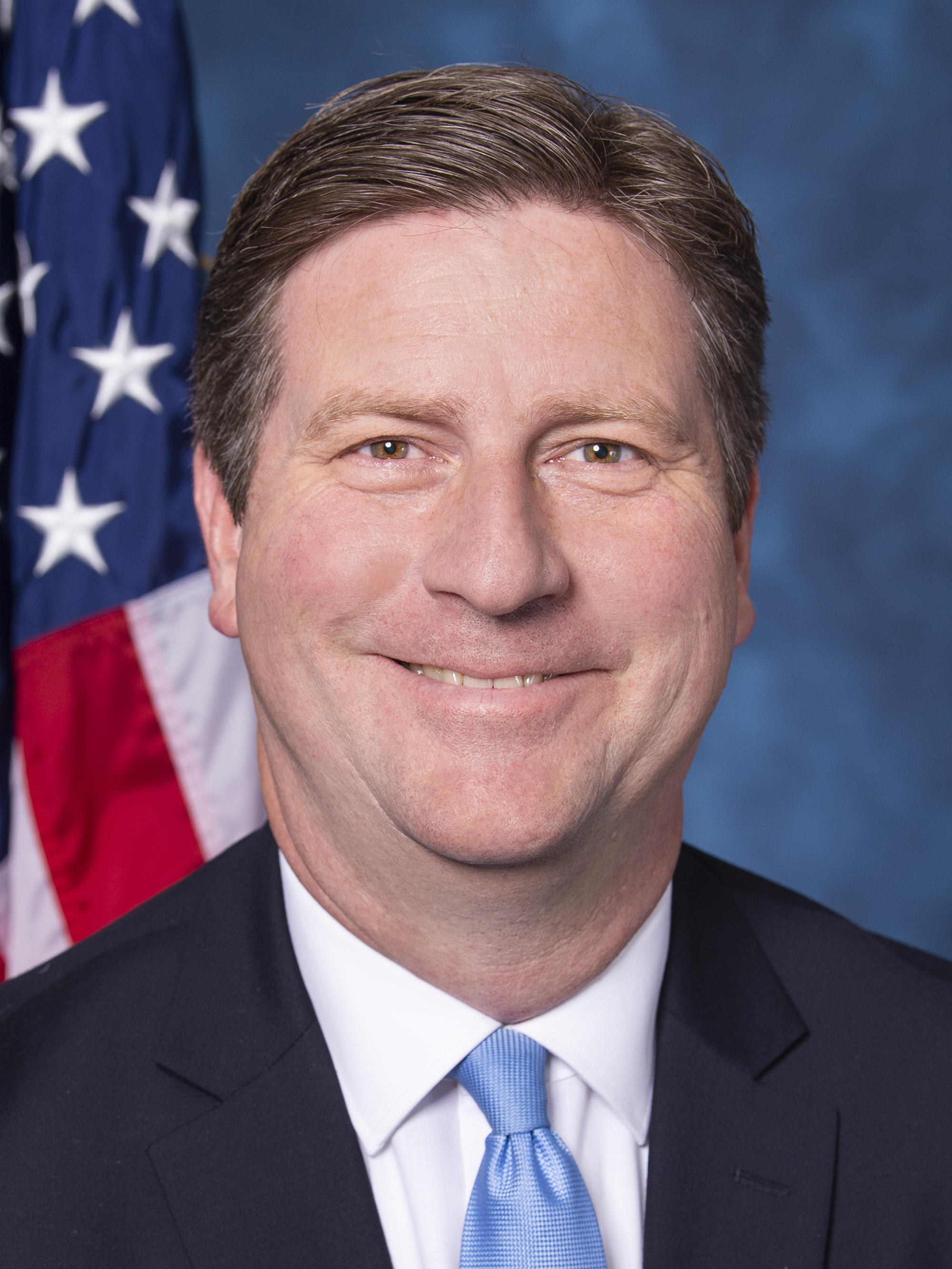

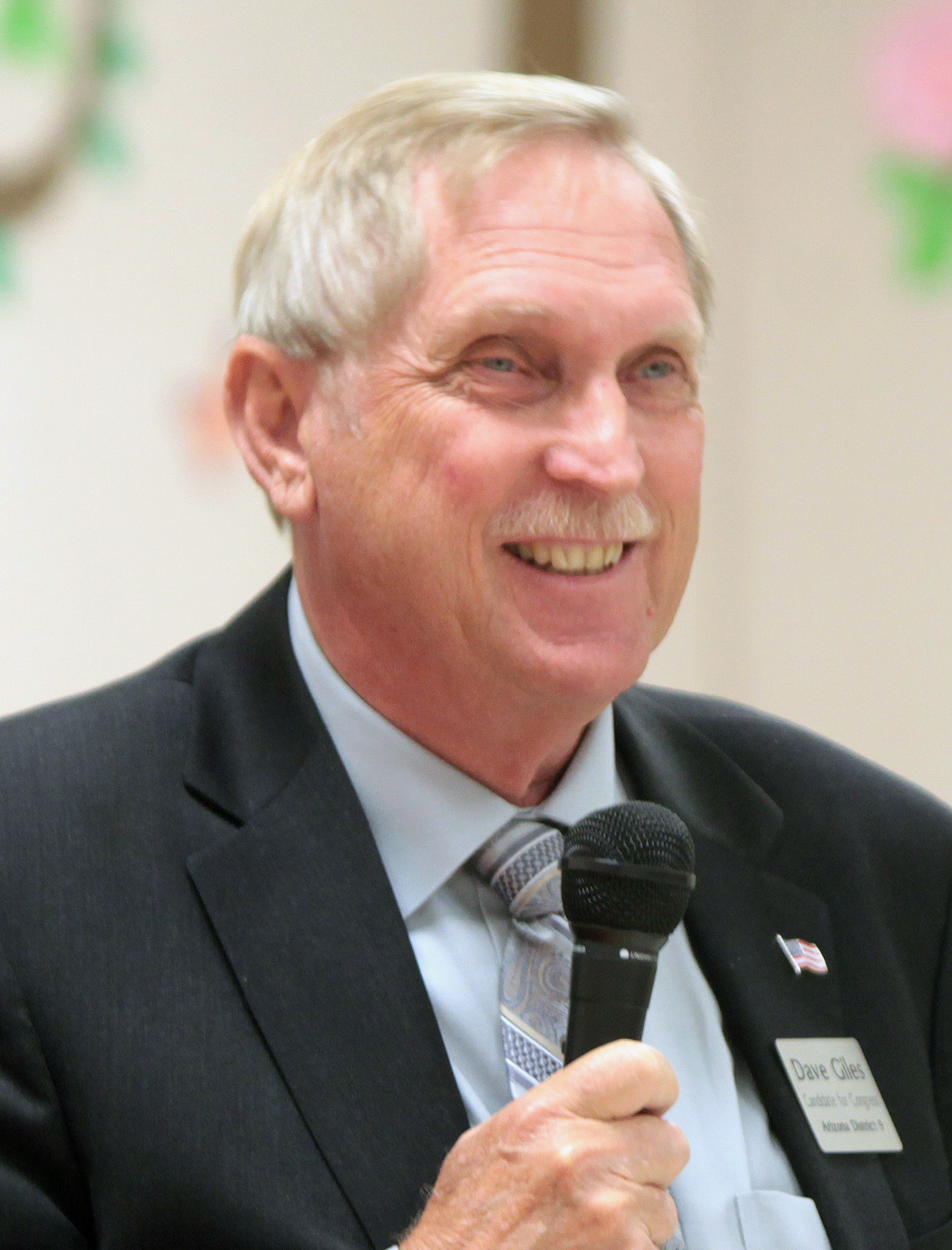
Nominee	Greg Stanton	Dave Giles
Party	Democratic	Republican
Popular vote	217,094	135,180
Percentage	61.6%	38.4%
- Precinct results Stanton: 50–60% 60–70% 70–80% 80–90% Giles: 50–60% No votes
U.S. Representative before election
Greg Stanton
Democratic
Elected U.S. Representative
Greg Stanton
Democratic

The 9th district is based in the Phoenix metro, and includes Tempe, southern Scottsdale, western Mesa, northwestern Chandler, and southern Phoenix, containing Ahwatukee and Camelback East. The incumbent was Democrat Greg Stanton, who was elected with 61.1% of the vote in 2018.

=== Democratic primary ===
==== Candidates ====
===== Declared =====
- Greg Stanton, incumbent U.S. representative

==== Primary results ====
Democratic primary results
Party	Candidate	Votes	%
Democratic	Greg Stanton (incumbent)	83,443	100.0
Total votes		83,443	100.0

=== Republican primary ===
==== Candidates ====
===== Declared =====
- Dave Giles, businessman, candidate for Arizona's 9th congressional district in 2018 and nominee in 2016
- Sam Huang, Chandler city councilman
- Nicholas Tutora, pharmacist

==== Primary results ====
Republican primary results
Party	Candidate	Votes	%
Republican	Dave Giles	28,461	53.7
Republican	Sam Huang	12,527	23.6
Republican	Nicholas Tutora	12,053	22.7
Total votes		53,041	100.0

=== Independents ===
==== Candidates ====
===== Withdrawn =====
- Irina Baroness von Behr, Republican candidate for Arizona's 9th congressional district in 2018

=== General election ===
==== Debate ====
2020 Arizona's 9th congressional district debate
No.	Date	Host	Moderator	Link	Democratic	Republican
Key: P Participant A Absent N Not invited I Invited W Withdrawn						
Key: P Participant A Absent N Not invited I Invited W Withdrawn					Greg Stanton	Dave Giles
1	Oct. 13, 2020	Arizona PBS; KJZZ; The Arizona Republic	Steve Goldstein; Richard Ruelas; Ted Simons	YouTube	P	P

==== Predictions ====
Source	Ranking	As of
The Cook Political Report	Safe D	November 2, 2020
Inside Elections	Safe D	October 28, 2020
Sabato's Crystal Ball	Safe D	November 2, 2020
Daily Kos	Safe D	November 2, 2020
RCP	Safe D	November 2, 2020
Decision Desk HQ	Safe D	November 3, 2020
538	Safe D	November 3, 2020
Elections Daily	Safe D	November 1, 2020
CNN	Safe D	November 1, 2020
Politico	Safe D	November 2, 2020
Niskanen	Safe D	June 7, 2020

==== Results ====
Arizona's 9th congressional district, 2020
Party	Candidate	Votes	%
Democratic	Greg Stanton (incumbent)	217,094	61.6
Republican	Dave Giles	135,180	38.4
Total votes		352,274	100.0
Democratic hold			

== See also ==
- 2020 Arizona elections

== Notes ==
Partisan clients

General notes

Official campaign websites
- District 1
  - Tom O'Halleran (D) for Congress Archived December 9, 2022, at the Wayback Machine
  - Tiffany Shedd (R) for Congress
- District 2
  - "Ann Kirkpatrick (D) for Congress". kirkpatrickforcongress.com. Archived from the original on May 13, 2010.
  - Brandon Martin (R) for Congress
- District 3
  - Raúl Grijalva (D) for Congress
  - Daniel Wood (R) for Congress Archived June 1, 2020, at the Wayback Machine
- District 4
  - Delina DiSanto (D) for Congress
  - Paul Gosar (R) for Congress
- District 5
  - Andy Biggs (R) for Congress
  - "Joan Greene (D) for Congress". Archived from the original on June 6, 2017.
- District 6
  - David Schweikert (R) for Congress
  - Hiral Tipirneni (D) for Congress Archived November 30, 2019, at the Wayback Machine
- District 7
  - "Josh Barnett (R) for Congress". barnettforaz.com. Archived from the original on July 24, 2019.
  - Ruben Gallego (D) for Congress
- District 8
  - Debbie Lesko (R) for Congress
  - Michael Muscato (D) for Congress
- District 9
  - Dave Giles (R) for Congress
  - Greg Stanton (D) for Congress
