= Tipirneni =

Tipirneni is a Telugu surname. Notable people with the surname include:

- Hiral Tipirneni (born 1967), Indian-American politician and physician
- Prashanti Tipirneni, Indian costume designer
