= 2018 Arizona's 8th congressional district special election =

- April 24, 2018

Arizona's 8th congressional district
- Turnout: 40.43%
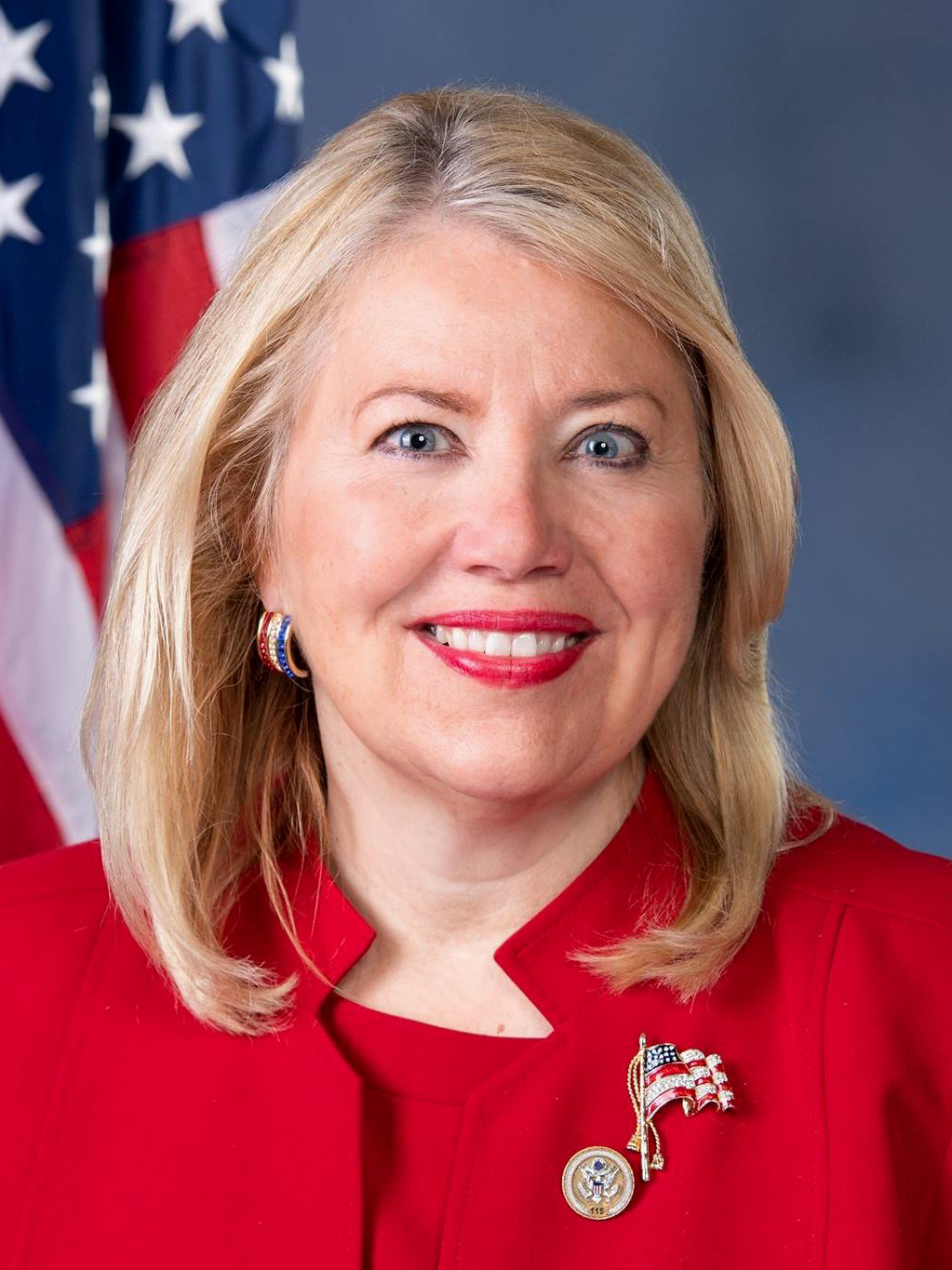

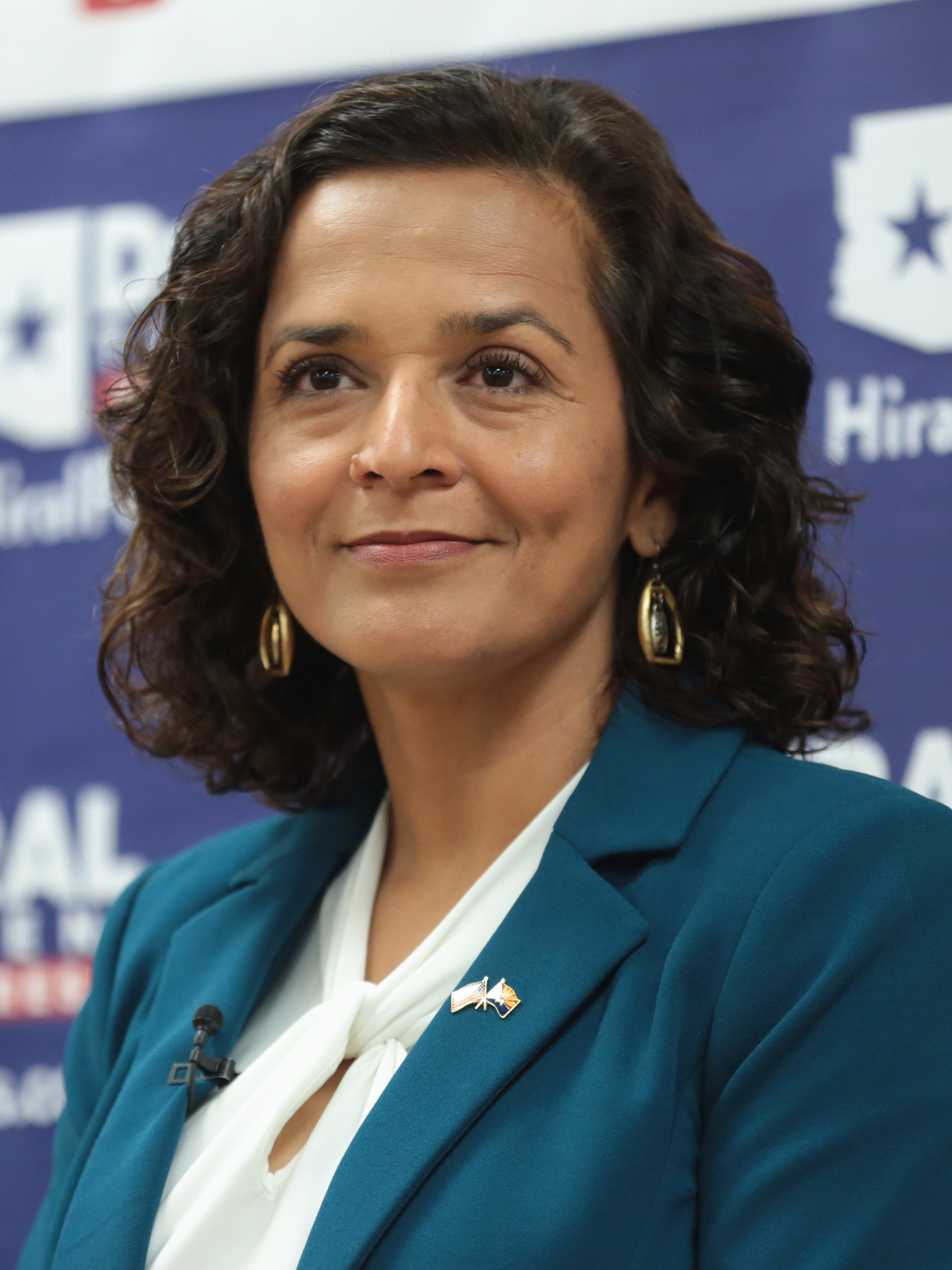
Nominee	Debbie Lesko	Hiral Tipirneni
Party	Republican	Democratic
Popular vote	96,012	87,331
Percentage	52.37%	47.63%
- Precinct results
U.S. Representative before election
Trent Franks
Republican
Elected U.S. Representative
Debbie Lesko
Republican

A special election for Arizona's 8th congressional district was held in 2018 subsequent to the resignation of Republican U.S. Representative Trent Franks. Governor Doug Ducey called a special primary election for Tuesday, February 27, 2018, and a special general election for the balance of Franks' eighth term for Tuesday, April 24, 2018.

Republican nominee and former Arizona Senate president pro tem Debbie Lesko won a closer-than-expected race against Democratic challenger Hiral Tipirneni.

== Background ==
Incumbent representative Trent Franks announced on December 7, 2017, that he would resign effective January 31, 2018, after admitting allegations regarding the issue of surrogacy. However, after his wife was hospitalized, Franks resigned effective December 8, 2017.

Candidates must file nomination forms and petitions within 30 days of the governor's proclamation. Candidates in special congressional elections in Arizona must collect a number of valid signatures equal to at least one-fourth of 1% of the number of qualified signers in the district. For the 2018 special election, a Democratic candidate requires 665 signatures, a Green candidate requires 392 signatures, a Libertarian candidate requires 401 signatures, a Republican candidate requires 860 signatures, and an independent candidate requires 4,680 signatures.

It was initially thought that Arizona's resign-to-run law would have required sitting members of the Arizona Legislature to resign their seats in order to run in the special election. Arizona's resign-to-run law does not require someone to resign if they file to run when they are in the final year of their term. However, the deadline to submit nominating petitions was January 10 and the end of the current term for members of the Arizona Legislature was January 14, 2019. However, legal advice from the legislature's nonpartisan counsel stated that incumbent state legislators would not be required to resign in order to run in the special election.

== Republican primary ==
Two of the major candidates in the Republican primary drew controversy late in the campaign. Former state senator Steve Montenegro faced calls to withdraw, including by former governor Jan Brewer, after news articles revealing sexually suggestive text messages between Montenegro and a legislative staffer surfaced. Additionally, complaints were filed against former state senator Debbie Lesko over her campaign finance records.

=== Candidates ===
==== Declared ====
- Chad Allen, health care executive
- Brenden Dilley, author, entrepreneur and host of Your Voice America
- Stephen Dolgos, independent candidate for Arizona's 8th congressional district in 2012 and 2014
- Debbie Lesko, former state senator
- Phil Lovas, former state representative, Arizona state chairman of Donald Trump's 2016 campaign, and regional advocate for the Small Business Administration's Office of Advocacy
- David Lien, teacher and former Willmar, Minnesota council member
- Richard Mack, teacher and former Graham County Sheriff
- Steve Montenegro, former state senator
- Bob Stump, former Arizona Corporation Commissioner
- Christopher Sylvester, Navy veteran
- Clair Van Steenwyk, radio host and candidate for the seat in 2016
- Mark Yates

==== Withdrew ====
- Kevin Cavanaugh, former deputy sheriff

==== Declined ====
- Clint Hickman, Maricopa County supervisor
- Kimberly Yee, state senator and candidate for state treasurer in 2018

=== Endorsements ===
Steve Montenegro

Individuals

- Joe Arpaio, former Maricopa County sheriff
- Bob Corbin, former Arizona attorney general
- Ted Cruz, U.S. senator (R-TX)
- Trent Franks, former congressman (R-AZ)
- Steve King, congressman (R-IA)
- Rick Santorum, former U.S. senator (R-PA)

=== Debates ===
- Dan Nowicki (January 25, 2018). "GOP Congress hopefuls try to outdo each other on border security, loyalty to Trump". The Arizona Republic. Includes video of debate, January 24, 2018.

=== Polling ===
Poll source	Date(s) administered	Sample size	Margin of error	Debbie Lesko	Phil Lovas	Richard Mack	Steve Montenegro	Bob Stump	Clair Van Steenwyck	Undecided
ABC 15/OH Predictive Insights (R)	January 29, 2018	400	± 4.9%	21%	12%	1%	21%	10%	5%	24%
Remington Research (R-Jobs, Freedom, and Security PAC)	January 20–21, 2018	787	± 3.5%	22%	–	–	24%	11%	–	–

Hypothetical polling

with Clint Hickman and Kimberly Yee

Poll source	Date(s) administered	Sample size	Margin of error	Travis Angry	Clint Hickman	Debbie Lesko	Phil Lovas	Richard Mack	Steve Montenegro	Tony Rivero	Bob Stump	Christopher Sylvester	Kimberly Yee	Undecided
ABC 15/OH Predictive Insights (R)	December 11, 2017	400	± 4.9%	1%	15%	16%	2%	–	1%	1%	18%	2%	7%	37%
Data Orbital (R)	December 9–11, 2017	400	± 4.9%	–	9%	15%	2%	3%	4%	–	10%	–	7%	51%

=== Results ===
Results by precinct Lesko: 20–30% 30–40% 40–50%; 50–60%; Lovas: 20–30% 30–40% 40–50%; Montenegro: 20–30% 30–40% 40–50%; Tie No data

Republican special primary results, Arizona 2018
Party	Candidate	Votes	%
Republican	Debbie Lesko	27,047	35.37%
Republican	Phil Lovas	18,652	24.39%
Republican	Steve Montenegro	18,106	23.68%
Republican	Bob Stump	4,032	5.27%
Republican	Clair Van Steenwyk	1,787	2.34%
Republican	Christopher Sylvester	1,490	1.95%
Republican	David Lien	1,341	1.75%
Republican	Richard Mack	1,191	1.56%
Republican	Mark Yates	871	1.14%
Republican	Chad Allen	824	1.08%
Republican	Brenden Dilley	823	1.08%
Republican	Stephen Dolgos	377	0.49%
Write-in		8	0.01%
Total votes		76,459	100%

== Democratic primary ==
=== Candidates ===
==== Declared ====
- Hiral Tipirneni, emergency department physician
- Brianna Westbrook, political activist and LGBTQ community leader

==== Declined ====
- Robert Olsen
- Robert Schuster, Arizona State University student

=== Results ===
Democratic special primary results, Arizona 2018
Party	Candidate	Votes	%
Democratic	Hiral Tipirneni	23,175	60.22%
Democratic	Brianna Westbrook	15,288	39.72%
Write-in		22	0.06%
Total votes		38,485	100%

== Green primary ==
=== Candidates ===
==== Declared ====
- Richard Grayson (write-in), candidate in Green Party presidential primary in Arizona in 2012
- Gary Swing (write-in), Green Party candidate for U.S. senator in Arizona in 2016

Each candidate received 13 write-in votes in the primary. Neither was placed on the special election ballot.

== Libertarian primary ==
=== Candidates ===
==== Declared ====
- Kelly Noble (write-in)

The candidate received 22 write-in votes in the primary and was not placed on the special election ballot.

== General election ==
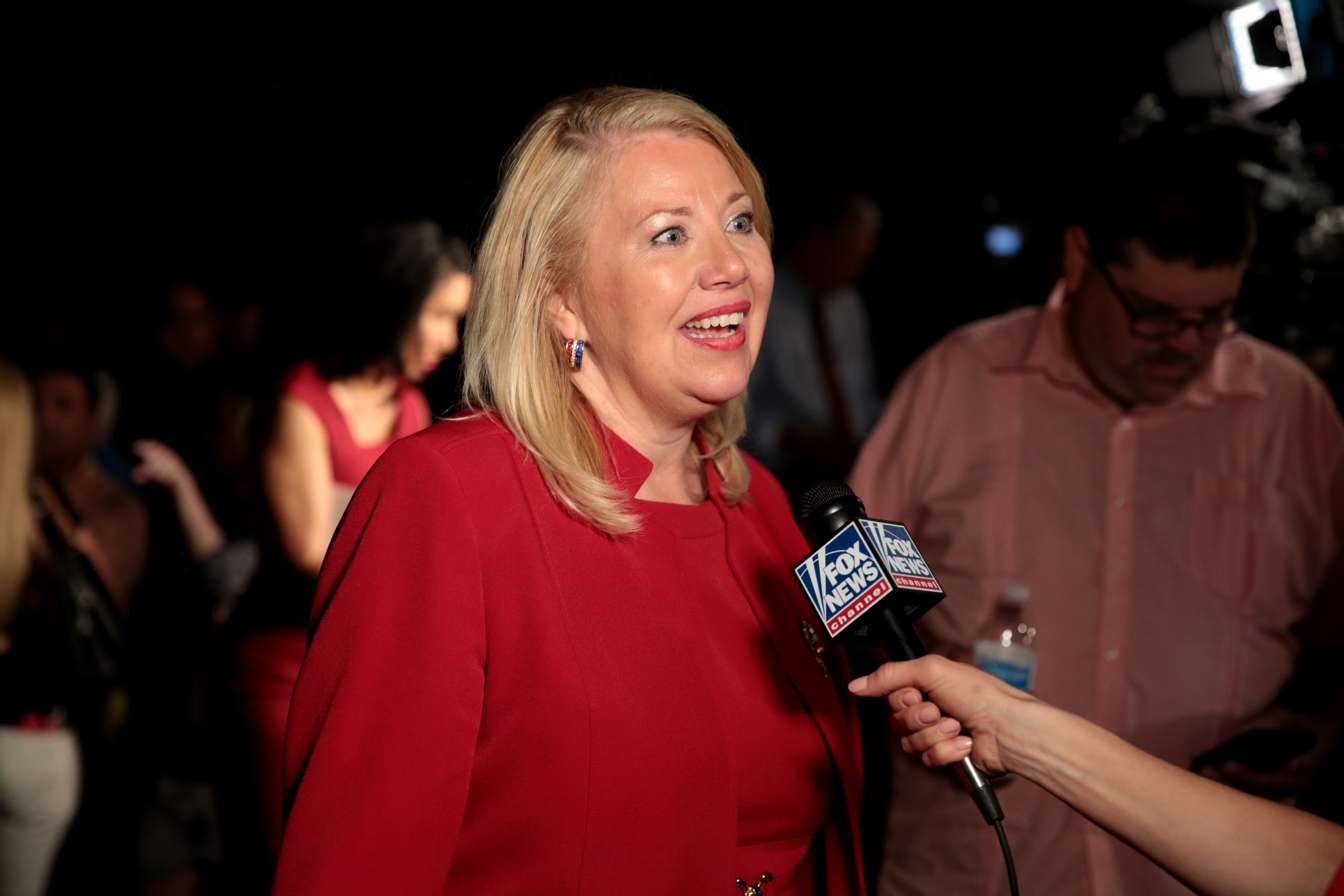
Debbie Lesko at a campaign event in Peoria, Arizona

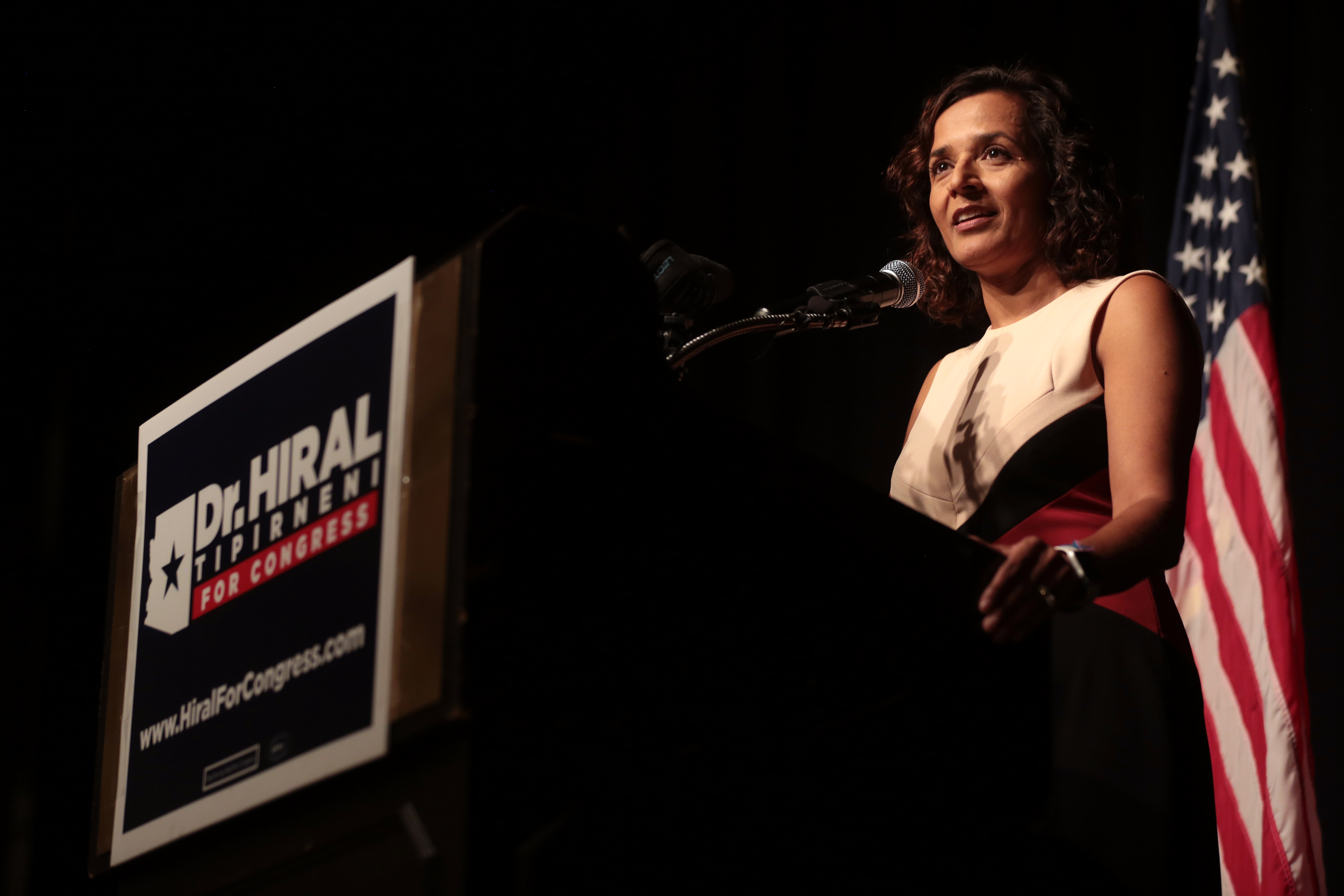
Hiral Tipirneni at a campaign event in Sun City, Arizona

Republican candidate Debbie Lesko received over $1 million in funding from Republican groups outside the state.

=== Candidates ===
- Debbie Lesko (Republican), former state senator
- Hiral Tipirneni (Democratic), emergency department physician

=== Debates ===
Host network	Date	Link(s)	Participants	
Host network	Date	Link(s)	Hiral Tipirneni (D)	Debbie Lesko (R)
KAET	March 26, 2018		Invited	Invited

=== Predictions ===
Source	Ranking	As of
The Cook Political Report	Likely R	March 2, 2018
Inside Elections/Rothenberg Political Report	Likely R	February 28, 2018
Sabato's Crystal Ball	Likely R	March 14, 2018

=== Endorsements ===
Debbie Lesko

Executive Branch Officials

- Donald Trump, 45th President of the United States

U.S. Senators

- Jon Kyl, former Arizona (1995-2013)

U.S. Representatives

- Andy Biggs, U.S. representative (R-AZ)
- Paul Gosar, U.S. representative (R-AZ)
- Jim Jordan, U.S. representative (R-OH)
- Kevin McCarthy, House Majority Leader and U.S. representative (R-CA)
- Martha McSally, U.S. representative (R-AZ) and candidate for U.S. Senate in 2018
- Mark Meadows, U.S. representative (R-NC), and chairman of the House Freedom Caucus
- David Schweikert, U.S. representative (R-AZ)

Statewide officials

- Jan Brewer, former governor of Arizona
- Mark Brnovich, attorney general of Arizona
- Doug Ducey, governor of Arizona

Organizations

- Maggie's List
- Susan B. Anthony List
- Winning For Women
Hiral Tipirneni

U.S. Senators

- Tim Kaine, Virginia (2013-present)

U.S. Representatives

- Ami Bera, U.S. representative (D-CA)
- Judy Chu, U.S. representative (D-CA)
- Ruben Gallego, U.S. representative (D-AZ)
- Gabrielle Giffords, former U.S. representative (D-AZ)
- Raul Grijalva, U.S. representative (D-AZ)
- Pramila Jayapal, U.S. representative (D-WA)
- Ro Khanna, U.S. representative (D-CA)
- Ann Kirkpatrick, former U.S. representative (D-AZ) and nominee for U.S. Senate in 2016
- Raja Krishnamoorthi, U.S. representative (D-IL)
- Conor Lamb, U.S. representative (D-PA)
- Grace Meng, U.S. representative (D-NY)
- Tom O'Halleran, U.S. representative (D-AZ)
- Ed Pastor, former U.S. representative (D-AZ)
- Donald Payne Jr., U.S. representative (D-NJ)
- Kyrsten Sinema, U.S. representative (D-AZ) and candidate for U.S. Senate in 2018

Local officials

- Steve Gallardo, member of the Maricopa County Board of Supervisors

Labor unions

- United Food and Commercial Workers Local 900

Organizations

- AAPI Victory Fund
- Americans for Responsible Solutions/GiffordsPAC
- Clinicians for Progressive Care
- EMILY's List
- End Citizens United
- Giffords PAC/Americans for Responsible Solutions
- The Indivisible Project
- League of Conservation Voters Action Fund
- MoveOn.org
- NARAL Pro-Choice America
- Stonewall Democrats of Arizona

=== Polling ===
Poll source	Date(s) administered	Sample size	Margin of error	Debbie Lesko (R)	Hiral Tipirneni (D)	Other	Undecided
Emerson College	April 19–22, 2018	400	± 5.2%	49%	43%	–	8%
Lake Research Partners (D-Tipirneni)	April 14–16, 2018	408	± 4.9%	44%	44%	–	11%
Emerson College	April 12–15, 2018	400	± 5.2%	45%	46%	4%	5%
OH Predictive Insights	April 11, 2018	500	± 4.4%	53%	43%	–	4%
Lake Research Partners (D-Tipirneni)	March 3–6, 2018	400	–	48%	34%	–	18%

=== Results ===
Arizona's 8th congressional district special election, 2018
Party	Candidate	Votes	%	±%
Republican	Debbie Lesko	96,012	52.37%	−16.18%
Democratic	Hiral Tipirneni	87,331	47.63%	N/A
Total votes		183,343	100%	N/A
Republican hold				

== See also ==
- 2018 United States House of Representatives elections in Arizona#District 8
- Arizona's 8th congressional district
