= Debbie Lesko =

American politician (born 1958)

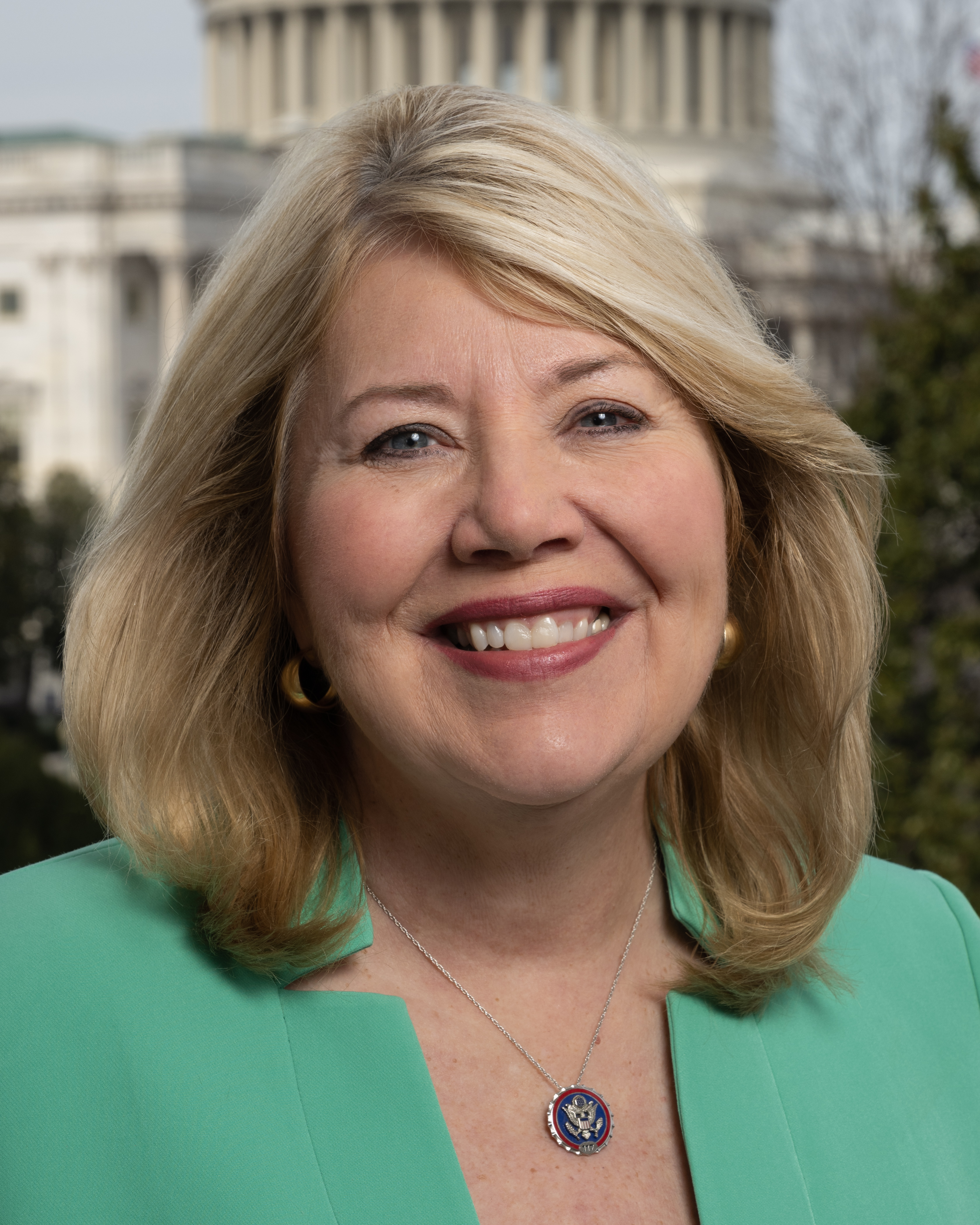
- Official portrait, 2022

Member of the Maricopa County Board of Supervisors from the 4th district
- Incumbent
- Assumed office January 6, 2025
- Preceded by: Clint Hickman

Member of the U.S. House of Representatives from Arizona's 8th district
- In office May 7, 2018 – January 3, 2025
- Preceded by: Trent Franks
- Succeeded by: Abraham Hamadeh

President pro tempore of the Arizona Senate
- In office January 9, 2017 – January 8, 2018
- Preceded by: Sylvia Allen
- Succeeded by: John Kavanagh

Member of the Arizona Senate from the 21st district
- In office January 12, 2015 – January 8, 2018
- Preceded by: Rick Murphy
- Succeeded by: Rick Gray

Member of the Arizona House of Representatives
- In office January 9, 2009 – January 12, 2015
- Preceded by: Bob Stump
- Succeeded by: Tony Rivero
- Constituency: 9th district (2009–2013); 21st district (2013–2015)

Personal details
- Born: Debra Kay Lorenz; November 14, 1958 (age 67) Sheboygan, Wisconsin, U.S.
- Party: Republican
- Spouse(s): Jeffrey Ignas (m. 1985; div. 1993) Joe Lesko
- Children: 3
- Education: University of Wisconsin, Madison (BA)
- Lesko's voice Lesko honoring Sandra Day O'Connor. Recorded December 12, 2023

Debra Kay Lesko (/ˈlɛskoʊ/ LESS-koh; née Lorenz; born November 14, 1958) is an American politician from the state of Arizona. Lesko, a member of the Republican Party, serves on the Maricopa County Board of Supervisors representing the 4th district. She previously represented Arizona's 8th congressional district in the U.S. House of Representatives from 2018 to 2025. The district is in the West Valley portion of the Phoenix metropolitan area and includes Glendale, Surprise, Sun City, Peoria, and part of western Phoenix. A member of the Republican Party, Lesko previously served in the Arizona State Legislature from 2009 to 2018.

Lesko served in the Arizona Senate from 2015 to 2018. She was president pro tempore of the Arizona Senate from 2017 to 2018. Lesko also served as a member of Arizona House of Representatives from 2009 until 2015. She became the Representative for Arizona's 8th congressional district after winning a 2018 special election.

In October 2023, Lesko announced she would not seek reelection in 2024. She later announced a run for the Maricopa County Board of Supervisors representing District 4. She was elected in the 2024 election, defeating Democratic candidate David Sandoval.

== Early life and education ==
Lesko was born in Sheboygan, Wisconsin. Her parents are Donald and Delores Lorenz. She received a bachelor's degree in business from the University of Wisconsin-Madison and moved to Arizona in the 1980s, where she owned a construction sales business. In 1985, she married Jeffrey Allen Ignas.

=== Legal issues ===
In 1988, Lesko was charged in Conroe, Texas, with misdemeanor tampering with government records; the charge was dismissed in 1994. Her then-husband, Jeffrey Allen Ignas, was convicted of fraud in 1988, sentenced to ten years' imprisonment, and released in 1992.

In October 1992, Lesko and Ignas filed for Chapter 13 bankruptcy protection. The couple was sued twice in 1993: for failure to pay a $10,000 rental equipment bill and for an additional unpaid $11,000 bill. They filed for bankruptcy again that year.

Ignas was allegedly abusive to Lesko, reportedly punching her in the stomach when she was pregnant. Later in 1993, Lesko filed for divorce.

In 1994 the second bankruptcy protection case was closed. Ignas, now known as Jeffrey Allen Herald, was again incarcerated at the Arizona Department of Corrections, and released in June 2022 on supervised probation.

Lesko later married Joe Lesko. She has used other names, including Debbie Harris, Debra Ignas, Debra Schultz, Debra Howard and Debra Kay Lorenz. Her name changes were associated with Ignas, who also went by different names.

== Early career ==
In the early 2000s, Lesko became involved in the Peoria Unified School District where she served on the district's community committee. In 2006, she ran for school board. Lesko was endorsed by U.S. Representative Trent Franks. She placed fourth out of five candidates. She participated in school board meetings and was a contributor to The Arizona Republic. Her contributions to the newspaper included opinion pieces about illegal immigration and domestic violence.

On November 4, 2008, Lesko was elected to the Arizona House of Representatives. She was reelected in 2010 and 2012.

In 2014, Lesko was elected to the Arizona State Senate. She was endorsed by the Arizona Police Association, AZ Right to Life, and the Greater Phoenix Chamber of Commerce. She ran unopposed in the Republican primary and defeated Democratic nominee Carolyn Vasko in the general election. In 2016, she ran unopposed in the primary and general election. In 2017, Lesko became president pro tempore of the Arizona Senate, the second-highest leadership position in the chamber, serving until January 2018.

== U.S. House of Representatives ==
=== Elections ===
==== 2018 special election ====
On December 20, 2017, Lesko announced she would run in the special election to replace Representative Trent Franks, who resigned amid allegations of sexual harassment. Her state senate district included the bulk of the congressional district. She also announced her resignation from the Arizona Senate. Although Arizona's resign-to-run laws allowed her to remain in the state senate since she was running in a special election (and she was in the final year of her term in any event), she resigned on January 8, 2018.

Lesko won the Republican nomination and faced the Democratic nominee, physician Hiral Tipirneni, in the special general election on April 24. She was endorsed by President Donald Trump.

She won the special general election, with 52.6% of the vote to Tipirneni's 47.4. The win was by a narrower margin than expected, with observers suggesting that it was indicative of a coming Democratic wave in the 2018 midterm elections. It was the closest contest in what is now the 8th since 1976, when Bob Stump won what was then the 3rd District with just 47% of the vote (the district was renumbered as the 2nd in 2003, and has been the 8th since 2013).

According to the Associated Press, the election sent "a big message to Republicans nationwide: Even the reddest of districts in a red state can be in play this year."

==== 2018 ====
Lesko defeated Tipirneni again for a full two-year term by a slightly wider margin, taking 55.5% to Tipirneni's 44.5%. It was still the closest general election in the district in 42 years, and the closest a Democrat had come to winning a full term in the district since Stump switched parties in 1982.

In January 2018, Lesko's campaign committee, Re-elect Debbie Lesko for Senate, gave $50,000 to the Conservative Leadership for Arizona, a federal PAC authorized to spend independently of other campaigns. It was created eight days before taking the money from Lesko's state campaign committee. The PAC raised almost no other cash and used the money to support Lesko with yard signs, while her congressional campaign spent heavily on television ads. Phil Lovas, a candidate in the Republican primary, complained to the Federal Election Commission and Arizona Attorney General alleging multiple violations in February 2018.

The PAC maneuver also prompted criticism from Lesko's other opponent in the Republican primary, Steve Montenegro. In March 2018, the Campaign Legal Center filed a federal campaign finance law violation complaint against Lesko, alleging that her transfer of $50,000 from her state campaign to an independent group that spent nearly all the cash backing her congressional run was illegal.

==== 2020 ====
In the 2020 election, Lesko defeated Democratic nominee Michael Muscato with 60% of the vote.

==== 2022 ====
Lesko ran for reelection in 2022 without opposition in the primary or general election.

=== Tenure ===
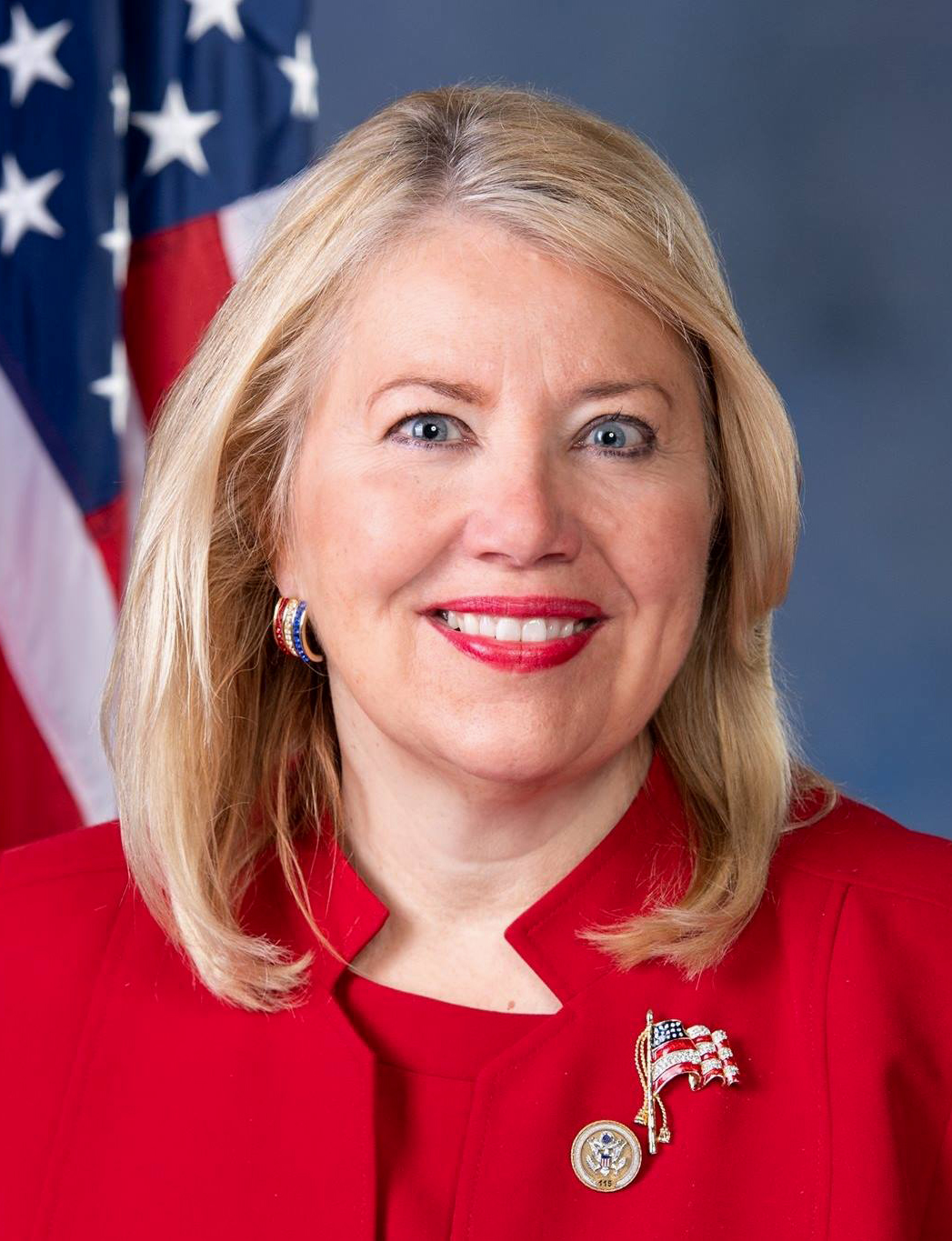
Official Portrait, 115th portrait

During the COVID-19 pandemic, Lesko appeared at a Trump rally in Tulsa, Oklahoma, at a time when coronavirus cases were surging across the nation. When asked about the public health risk the rally posed, she responded, "I think the Trump administration and the campaign is doing all it can by doing temperature checks and handing out masks." She defended the rally organizers' decision not to require face masks. During the time, she posted pictures of herself among people; in some pictures she wore a mask, in others she did not.

As of October 2021, Lesko had voted in line with Joe Biden's stated position 13.9% of the time.

=== Committee assignments ===
For the 118th Congress:

- Committee on Energy and Commerce
  - Subcommittee on Energy, Climate, and Grid Security
  - Subcommittee on Innovation, Data, and Commerce
  - Subcommittee on Oversight and Investigations
- Select Subcommittee on the Coronavirus Pandemic

=== Caucus memberships ===
- Co-chair, Women in STEM Caucus
- Chair, Congressional Caucus to Protect Kids
- Former co-chair, Congressional Caucus on Women's Issues (116th Congress)
- Vice Chair, Congressional Western Caucus
- Congressional Taiwan Caucus
- Freedom Caucus
- Rare Disease Caucus
- Republican Study Committee

== Political positions ==
=== Abortion ===
Lesko opposes abortion. She has proposed legislation to give employers religious exemptions from providing contraceptives in health insurance plans. She has proposed legislation that would allow health officials to conduct warrantless and unannounced inspections of abortion clinics, which critics said undermined the privacy of the clinics' patients. She supported the 2022 overturning of Roe v. Wade. Lesko introduced the Dismemberment Abortion Ban Act in the 117th Congress. In the 118th Congress, Lesko voted for the Born-Alive Abortion Survivors Protection Act.

=== Donald Trump ===
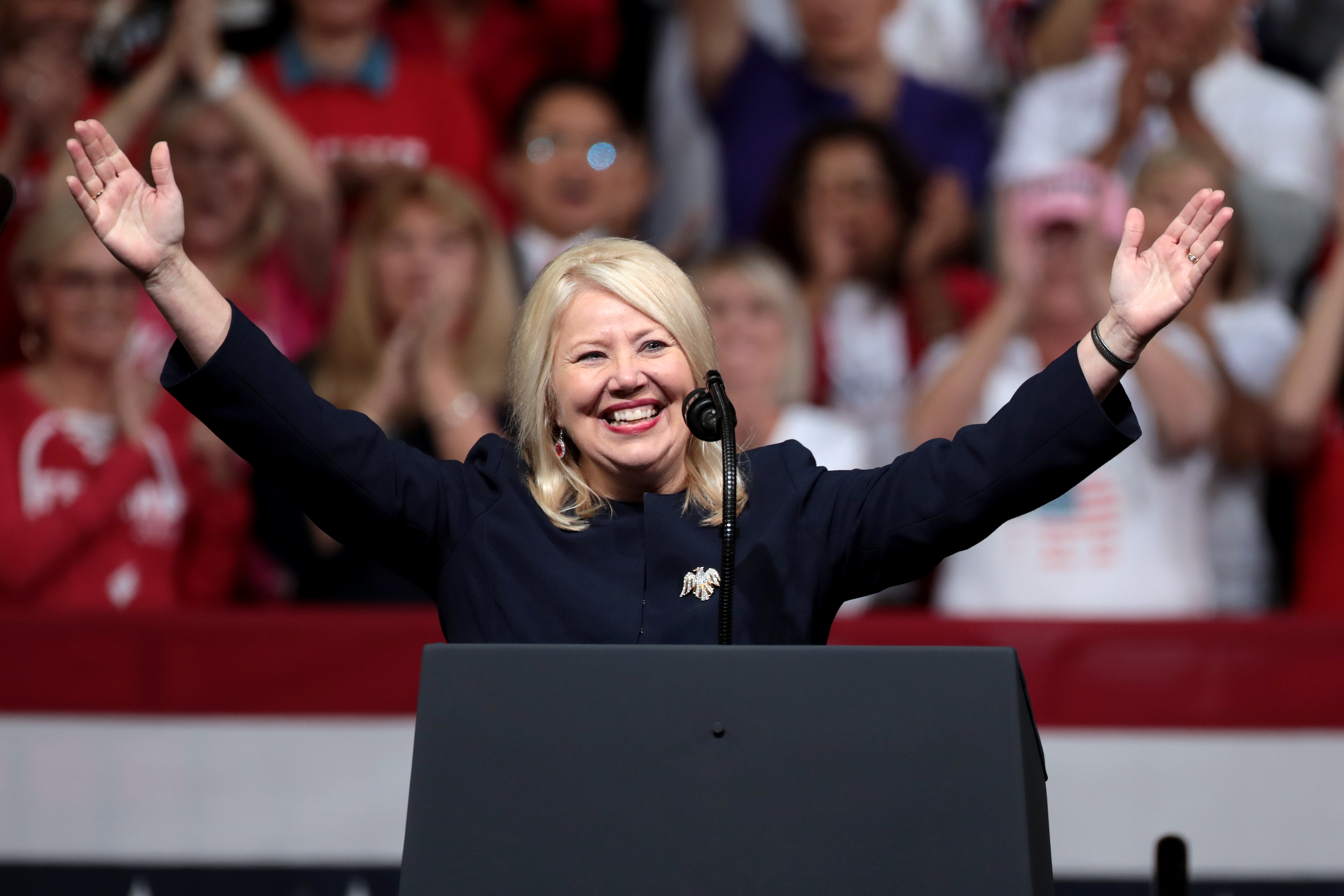
Lesko speaking with supporters of Donald Trump at a "Keep America Great" rally in Phoenix, Arizona in 2020.

Lesko has been described as a loyal ally of former president Donald Trump. In December 2019, she voted against impeaching him. She said there is "no proof, none, that the president has committed an impeachable offense." In defending Trump, she said that he had not asked President of Ukraine Volodymyr Zelenskyy to investigate Joe Biden, his opponent in the 2020 presidential election.

In December 2020, Lesko was one of 126 Republican members of the House of Representatives to sign an amicus brief in support of Texas v. Pennsylvania, a lawsuit filed at the United States Supreme Court contesting the results of the 2020 presidential election, in which Biden defeated Trump. The Supreme Court declined to hear the case on the basis that Texas lacked standing under Article III of the Constitution to challenge the results of an election held by another state. House Speaker Nancy Pelosi issued a statement that called signing the amicus brief an act of "election subversion".

Lesko was one of the 139 Republican representatives to vote to overturn the results of the 2020 presidential election in Congress at the 2021 United States Electoral College vote count.

=== Economy, taxes and regulation ===
Lesko has said that she would have voted for the Tax Cuts and Jobs Act of 2017, the Republican Party's 2017 tax overhaul. She favors a balanced budget amendment to the Constitution, and said that "on the federal level, there has to be a lot of areas where we can cut spending."

In 2017, Lesko championed legislation that would allow payday lenders to provide loans at annual interest rates as high as 164%. In 2016, she opposed efforts to increase the minimum wage in Arizona to $10 by 2017 and $12 by 2020.

Lesko was among the 71 Republicans who voted against final passage of the Fiscal Responsibility Act of 2023 in the House.

=== Education ===
Lesko favors empowering private schools and charter schools. Lesko introduced the Make Education Local Act of 2021 in the 117th Congress.

=== Environment and energy ===
Lesko rejects the scientific consensus on climate change, which states that climate change is progressing, dangerous, and primarily human caused. She has instead claimed that "certainly not the majority of it" is human-caused.

In 2016, Lesko crafted a measure that would give Arizona utilities the right to charge separate rates for customers who produced their own energy through solar panels in order to prevent $600 million in subsidies from non-solar customers to solar customers. She crafted the measure with the utilities' assistance.

=== Gun policy ===
Lesko opposes changes to existing gun laws, saying "I think there's enough laws. The laws need to be enforced." She has received an "A" rating from the NRA Political Victory Fund.

=== Health care ===
Lesko opposes universal health care and favors repealing the Affordable Care Act (Obamacare). She opposed Arizona's expansion of Medicaid coverage and sued former Arizona Governor Jan Brewer after she expanded the program.

Lesko has said that COVID-19 vaccine distribution should prioritize American citizens over those who are in the country illegally.

In 2017, Lesko sponsored and passed a bill in the Arizona State Senate that created a process for challenging a surprise medical bill when care is received from an out-of-network doctor at an in-network facility. Lesko said, "I knew this was an ongoing problem. I had seen reports that the media had done of different patients through no fault of their own were getting these surprise medical bills." Lesko introduced a resolution to recognize Medicare and Social Security as an important benefit that should be strengthened for future generations.

=== Immigration ===
Lesko made the construction of a border wall on the Mexico border the centerpiece of her 2018 campaign, and pledged to back the Trump administration's hardline positions on border security and immigration reform.

=== LGBT rights ===
Lesko strongly opposes the Equality Act, a bill that would expand the federal Civil Rights Act of 1964 to ban discrimination based on sexual orientation and gender identity. She urged Congress members to vote against the bill.

=== Foreign policy ===
Lesko was among 60 Republicans voting against condemning Trump's withdrawal from Syria.

== Personal life ==
Lesko is a Baptist.

== Electoral history ==
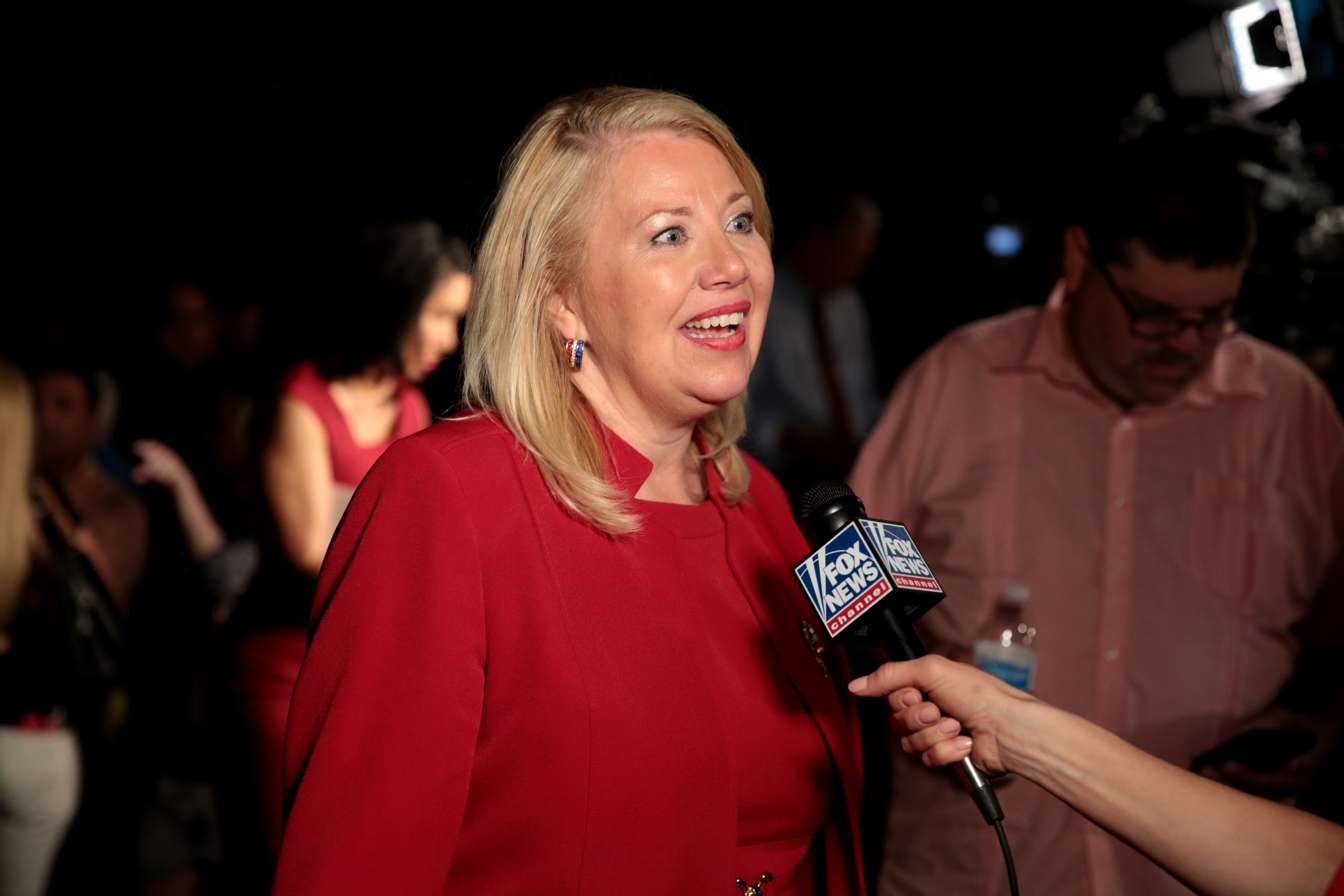
Debbie Lesko at a campaign event in Peoria, Arizona.

- 2014: Lesko ran for the open Arizona Senate District 21 held by retiring Senator Rick Murphy. She was unopposed in the Republican primary. Lesko defeated Carolyn Vasko in the general election with 32,119 votes.
- 2012: Redistricted to District 21 alongside fellow Republican Representative Rick Gray, and with incumbent Republican Representatives Thomas Forese and J. D. Mesnard redistricted to District 17, Lesko ran in the August 28 Republican primary, placing first with 14,771 votes; in the five-way November 6 general election, she took the first seat with 41,023 votes and Gray the second, ahead of Democratic nominees Carol Lokare, Sheri Van Horsen and a Libertarian write-in candidate.
- 2010: With Murphy running for Arizona Senate, leaving a District 9 seat open, Lesko ran in the August 24 Republican primary and placed first with 14,498 votes; in the three-way November 2 general election, she took the first seat with 32,423 votes and Gray took the second, ahead of Democratic nominee Shirley McAllister.
- 2008: With incumbent state Representative Bob Stump running for Arizona Corporation Commission and leaving a District 9 seat open, Murphy and Lesko were unopposed in the September 2 Republican primary; Lesko placed first with 10,902 votes and Murphy placed second; in the November 4 general election, Lesko took the first seat with 37,762 votes and Murphy the second, ahead of Democratic nominees Van Horsen and Shawn Hutchinson.

Republican special primary results, Arizona 2018
| Party | Candidate | Votes | % |
|---|---|---|---|
| Republican | Debbie Lesko | 27,047 | 35.37% |
| Republican | Phil Lovas | 18,652 | 24.39% |
| Republican | Steve Montenegro | 18,106 | 23.68% |
| Republican | Bob Stump | 4,032 | 5.27% |
| Republican | Clair Van Steenwyk | 1,787 | 2.34% |
| Republican | Christopher Sylvester | 1,490 | 1.95% |
| Republican | David Lien | 1,341 | 1.75% |
| Republican | Richard Mack | 1,191 | 1.56% |
| Republican | Mark Yates | 871 | 1.14% |
| Republican | Chad Allen | 824 | 1.08% |
| Republican | Brenden Dilley | 823 | 1.08% |
| Republican | Stephen Dolgos | 377 | 0.49% |
| Write-in | | 8 | 0.01% |
| Total votes | | 76,459 | 100% |

Arizona's 8th congressional district special election, 2018
| Party | Candidate | Votes | % | ±% |
|---|---|---|---|---|
| Republican | Debbie Lesko | 96,012 | 52.4% | −15.97 |
| Democratic | Hiral Tipirneni | 87,331 | 47.6% | +47.6 |
| Total votes | | 183,343 | 100.00 | |
| Plurality | | 8,682 | 5.2% | |
| Republican hold | | Swing | -16.0% | |

Republican primary results, Arizona 2018
| Party | Candidate | Votes | % |
|---|---|---|---|
| Republican | Debbie Lesko (incumbent) | 73,776 | 77.17% |
| Republican | Sandra E. Dowling | 21,825 | 22.83% |
| Total votes | | 95,601 | 100% |

Arizona's 8th congressional district, 2018
| Party | Candidate | Votes | % |
|---|---|---|---|
| Republican | Debbie Lesko (incumbent) | 168,835 | 55.46% |
| Democratic | Hiral Tipirneni | 135,569 | 44.53% |
| Write-in | | 13 | <0.01% |
| Total votes | | 304,417 | 100% |
| Republican hold | | | |

Arizona's 8th congressional district, 2020
| Party | Candidate | Votes | % |
|---|---|---|---|
| Republican | Debbie Lesko (incumbent) | 251,633 | 59.6 |
| Democratic | Michael Muscato | 170,816 | 40.4 |
| Write-in | | 18 | 0.0 |
| Total votes | | 422,467 | 100.0 |
| Republican hold | | | |

Arizona's 8th congressional district, 2022
| Party | Candidate | Votes | % |
|---|---|---|---|
| Republican | Debbie Lesko (incumbent) | 197,555 | 96.5 |
| Democratic | Jeremy Spreitzer (write-in) | 5,145 | 2.5 |
| Democratic | Alixandria Guzman (write-in) | 2,013 | 1.0 |
| Total votes | | 204,713 | 100.0 |
| Republican hold | | | |

== See also ==
- Women in the United States House of Representatives

Arizona Senate
| Preceded by Sylvia Allen | President pro tempore of the Arizona Senate; 2017–2018 | Succeeded by John Kavanagh |
U.S. House of Representatives
| Preceded by Trent Franks | Member of the U.S. House of Representatives from Arizona's 8th congressional district 2018–2025 | Succeeded by Abraham Hamadeh |
U.S. order of precedence (ceremonial)
| Preceded by Tom O'Halleran as Former U.S. Representative | Order of precedence of the United States as Former U.S. Representative | Succeeded by Michael Myers as Former U.S. Representative |
