= AAPI Victory Fund =

- Formation: 2016
- Key people: Shekar Narasimhan (Chair and Founder); Bel Leong-Hong (Co-Founder); Dilawar Syed (Co-Founder); Tung Nguyen (Co-Founder); Norman Mineta (Chair, National Leadership Council))
- Affiliations: Democratic
- Website: aapivictoryfund.com

The AAPI Victory Fund is a Political Action Committee that focuses on mobilizing Asian American and Pacific Islanders (AAPI) eligible voters and supports Democrat AAPI candidates.

In September 2019, the organization hosted the first Democratic Presidential Forum for the AAPI community. Held at the Segerstrom Center in Orange County, Presidential candidates Tulsi Gabbard, Tom Steyer, and Andrew Yang attended the townhall forum. On January 17, 2020, the AAPI Victory Fund endorsed Joe Biden for president. On May 5, 2021, they endorsed Andrew Yang for Mayor of New York City. On July 21, 2024, they endorsed Kamala Harris for president.

== Contributions to Candidates ==
Since its founding, AAPI Victory Fund has raised 2.8 million U.S. dollars and has made nearly $14,000 in individual contributions to presidential, senate, and house candidates. The organization spent $500,000 in independent expenditures.

Year Cycle	Funds Raised	Presidential Contributions	Senate Contributions	House Contributions	Independent Expenditures
2020	$1,551,290	Joe Biden (D) | $3,030	Bernie Sanders (D-VT) | $2,673 John Hickenlooper (D-CO) | $50	Gil Cisneros (D-CA) | $2500 Judy Chu (D-CA) | $225 Donna Imam (D-TX) | $185 Gina Ortiz Jones (D-TX) | $185 Sri Kulkarni (D-TX) | $185 Sima Ladjevardian (D-TX) | $185 Helane Seikaly (D-TX) | $185	FOR Joe Biden (D) | $149,984 FOR MJ Hegar (D-TX) $133,965
2018	$544,724	None	None	Andrew Janz (D-CA) | $560 Grace Meng (D-NY) | $500 Gina Ortiz Jones (D-TX) | $100 Stephanie Murphy (D-FL) | $75 Abigail Spanberger (D-VA) | $18	FOR Jon Ossoff (D-GA) | $2,998 FOR Hiral Tipirneni (D-AZ) | $5,000
2016	$703,107	Hillary Clinton (D) | $1,700	Katie McGinty (D-PA) | $1,364	None	AGAINST Richard Burr (R-NC) | $10,420 AGAINST Joe Heck (R-NV) | $10,000 AGAINST Donald Trump (R) | $72,120 FOR Hillary Clinton (D) | $93,668 FOR Catherine Cortez Masto (D-NV) | $13,499 FOR Deborah Ross (D-NC) | $11,080

== Controversies ==
On March 12, 2019, Open Secrets reported that a Chinese-owned company provided illegal contributions through its US-based American Pacific International Capital (APIC) to Jeb Bush's super PAC Right to Rise. APIC also made contributions to the AAPI Victory Fund and was the organization's fifth largest donor for the 2016 election cycle.
