= Hiral Tipirneni =

American politician and physician (born 1967)

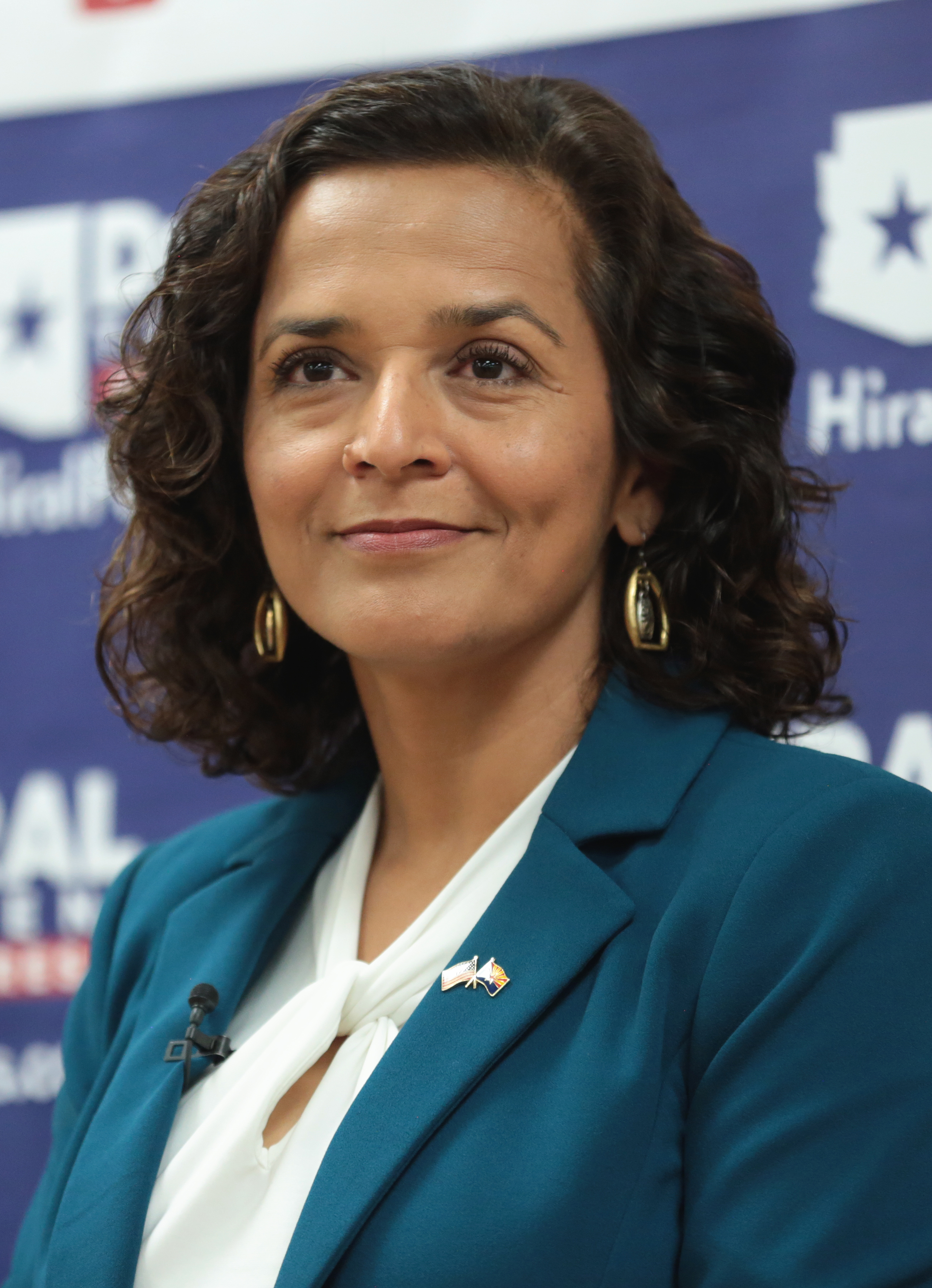
- Tipirneni in 2018

Personal details
- Born: September 28, 1967 (age 58) Mumbai, India
- Party: Democratic
- Spouse: Kishore
- Children: 3
- Education: Youngstown State University (BS); Northeast Ohio Medical University (MD)
- Website: hiralforcongress.com

Hiral Vyas Tipirneni (/ˈhɪrəl tɪpərˈnɛni/ HEAR-uhl tip-er-NEH-knee; born September 28, 1967) is an Indian-American politician and physician. She worked for a decade in Phoenix, Arizona, area emergency departments, is a cancer research advocate, and serves on the board of directors of the Maricopa Health Foundation. In 2018, she was the Democratic nominee for special election for Arizona's 8th congressional district, which was called to fill the congressional seat after former GOP Representative Trent Franks resigned following a sexual misconduct scandal.

Tipirneni won a special primary election on February 27, 2018, and was defeated by Republican nominee Debbie Lesko in the general election on April 24, 2018. However, she managed to lower the Republican margin of victory by over 16 percentage points. Tipirneni was defeated again in the regular election in November 2018 by an eleven-point margin.

Tipirneni ran again in the 2020 United States House of Representatives elections in Arizona as the Democratic nominee for Arizona's 6th congressional district, a suburban district that was more Democratic-leaning than Arizona's 8th. She lost to the incumbent David Schweikert with 47.8% of the vote.

== Early life and education ==
Tipirneni was born in Mumbai, India, and in 1971, aged 3, with her parents, immigrated to the United States, and settled in Cleveland, Ohio.

Tipirneni earned her Doctor of Medicine degree from Northeast Ohio Medical University.

== Medical career ==
Following graduation from medical school, Tipirneni became chief resident in the University of Michigan Health System's Emergency Department, and later became a member of the Board of Directors of Maricopa Health Foundation, the fund-raising arm of the Maricopa Integrated Health System.

== Electoral history ==
=== 2018 congressional special election ===
In August 2017, Tipirneni, a Democrat, announced her candidacy for the congressional seat representing the 8th district then held by Republican Trent Franks. She later entered the race in the special election for Arizona's 8th congressional district, following Franks' resignation amidst numerous claims of sexual misbehavior with female staffers. Tipirneni defeated Brianna Westbrook in the special primary election on Tuesday, February 27, 2018.

Democratic primary results
Party	Candidate	Votes	%
Democratic	Hiral Tipirneni	21,703	59.6%
Democratic	Brianna Westbrook	14,701	40.4%
Total votes		36,404	100.00%

==== General election ====
She faced Debbie Lesko in the general election on Tuesday, April 24, 2018. Tipirneni has garnered some national support including endorsements from End Citizens United and Gabby Giffords, the former congresswoman from Arizona. However, she has received little support from national Democratic campaign groups. Although a relative newcomer to politics, she has been successful in raising more campaign funds than her opponent and is also outspending Lesko in television ads. A poll published by Emerson College on April 16 had Tipirneni with "a slight lead, 46 percent to 45 percent". Another poll published by Lake Research Partners had the candidates tied at 44 to 44.

Tipirneni lost by a relatively small margin in a district that has historically leaned heavily towards her opponent's party. She earned 47.6% of the vote to Lesko's 52.4% in a district that voted for President Donald Trump by a 21% margin. Tipirneni planned to run again in the regular elections in November 2018.

General election results
Party	Candidate	Votes	%
Republican	Debbie Lesko	96,012	52.4%
Democratic	Hiral Tipirneni	87,331	47.6%
Total votes		183,343	100.00%

=== 2018 congressional general election ===
Tipirneni won the otherwise uncontested Democratic primary. She was defeated for a second time by Debbie Lesko, getting 44.5% of the vote to Lesko's 55.5%.

Democratic primary results
Party	Candidate	Votes	%
Democratic	Hiral Tipirneni	52,215	100.0
Total votes		52,215	100.0

Arizona's 8th congressional district, 2018
Party	Candidate	Votes	%
Republican	Debbie Lesko (incumbent)	168,835	55.5
Democratic	Hiral Tipirneni	135,569	44.5
New Paradigm Party	Steven Hummel (write-in)	13	0.0
Total votes		304,417	100.0
Republican hold			

=== 2020 congressional general election ===
Tipirneni won a four-way Democratic primary with 53.2% of the vote. She then lost the general election to the incumbent David Schweikert, getting 47.8% of the vote to Schweikert's 52.2%.

After election night, Tipirneni sent out a fundraising email asking for funds to ensure her supporters' votes were counted, drawing widespread criticism that she was attempting to undermine faith in the election, and comparisons to Martha McSally and Donald Trump.

Democratic primary results
Party	Candidate	Votes	%
Democratic	Hiral Tipirneni	42,538	53.2
Democratic	Anita Malik	29,218	36.5
Democratic	Stephanie Rimmer	4,592	5.7
Democratic	Karl Gentles	3,651	4.6
Total votes		79,999	100.0

Arizona's 6th congressional district
Party	Candidate	Votes	%
Republican	David Schweikert (incumbent)	217,783	52.2
Democratic	Hiral Tipirneni	199,644	47.8
Total votes		417,427	100.0
Republican hold			

== Political positions ==
Her campaign has focused on issues related to health care, education, and retirement security, and emphasizes her "data-driven approach" to public policy. Tipirneni also advocates for "commonsense" gun control measures, comprehensive immigration reform, and a public health insurance option. Tipirneni also agrees that Americans have the Second Amendment right to purchase firearms legally in order "to protect their homes, themselves and their families, and for hunting and sport".

== Personal life ==
Hiral met her husband Kishore Tipirneni during the first year of medical school. They have two daughters and a son.
