= 2018 United States House of Representatives elections in Arizona =

- November 6, 2018

All 9 Arizona seats to the United States House of Representatives
	Majority party	Minority party
Party	Democratic	Republican
Last election	4	5
Seats won	5	4
Seat change	▲1	▼1
Popular vote	1,179,193	1,139,251
Percentage	50.37%	48.67%
Swing	▲5.65%	▼3.82%

Democratic
50–60%
60–70%
80–90%
Republican
50–60%
60–70%
70–80%

The 2018 United States House of Representatives elections in Arizona were held on November 6, 2018, to elect the nine U.S. representatives from the State of Arizona, one from each of the state's nine congressional districts. The elections coincided with the 2018 Arizona gubernatorial election, as well as other elections to the U.S. House of Representatives, elections to the United States Senate and various state and local elections. The 2018 general elections saw the Democratic party gain the 2nd congressional district, thus flipping the state from a 5–4 Republican advantage to a 5–4 Democratic advantage, the first time since the 2012 election in which Democrats held more House seats in Arizona than the Republicans.

== Overview ==
=== Statewide ===
Party	Candidates	Votes		Seats		
Party	Candidates	No.	%	No.	+/–	%
Democratic	9	1,179,193	50.37	5	▲1	55.56
Republican	9	1,139,251	48.67	4	▼1	44.44
Green	2	22,378	0.96	0	Steady	0.0
Write-in	3	147	0.01	0	Steady	0.0
Total	23	2,341,270	100.0	9	Steady	100.0

Popular vote
Democratic	50.37%
Republican	48.67%
Green	0.96%
Other	0.01%

House seats
Democratic	55.56%
Republican	44.44%

=== By district ===
Results of the 2018 United States House of Representatives elections in Arizona by district:

District	Democratic		Republican		Others		Total		Result
District	Votes	%	Votes	%	Votes	%	Votes	%	Result
District 1	143,240	53.83%	122,784	46.14%	65	0.03%	266,089	100.0%	Democratic hold
District 2	161,000	54.73%	133,083	45.24%	69	0.02%	294,152	100.0%	Democratic gain
District 3	114,650	63.87%	64,868	36.13%	0	0.00%	179,518	100.0%	Democratic hold
District 4	84,521	30.51%	188,842	68.16%	3,672	1.33%	277,035	100.0%	Republican hold
District 5	127,027	40.58%	186,037	59.42%	0	0.00%	313,064	100.0%	Republican hold
District 6	140,559	44.81%	173,140	55.19%	0	0.00%	313,699	100.0%	Republican hold
District 7	113,044	85.61%	301	0.20%	19,007	14.39%	132,051	100.0%	Democratic hold
District 8	135,569	44.53%	168,835	55.46%	13	0.01%	304,417	100.0%	Republican hold
District 9	159,583	61.09%	101,662	38.91%	0	0.00%	261,245	100.0%	Democratic hold
Total	1,179,193	50.37%	1,139,251	48.66%	22,826	0.97%	2,341,270	100.0%	

== District 1 ==
2018 Arizona's 1st congressional district election
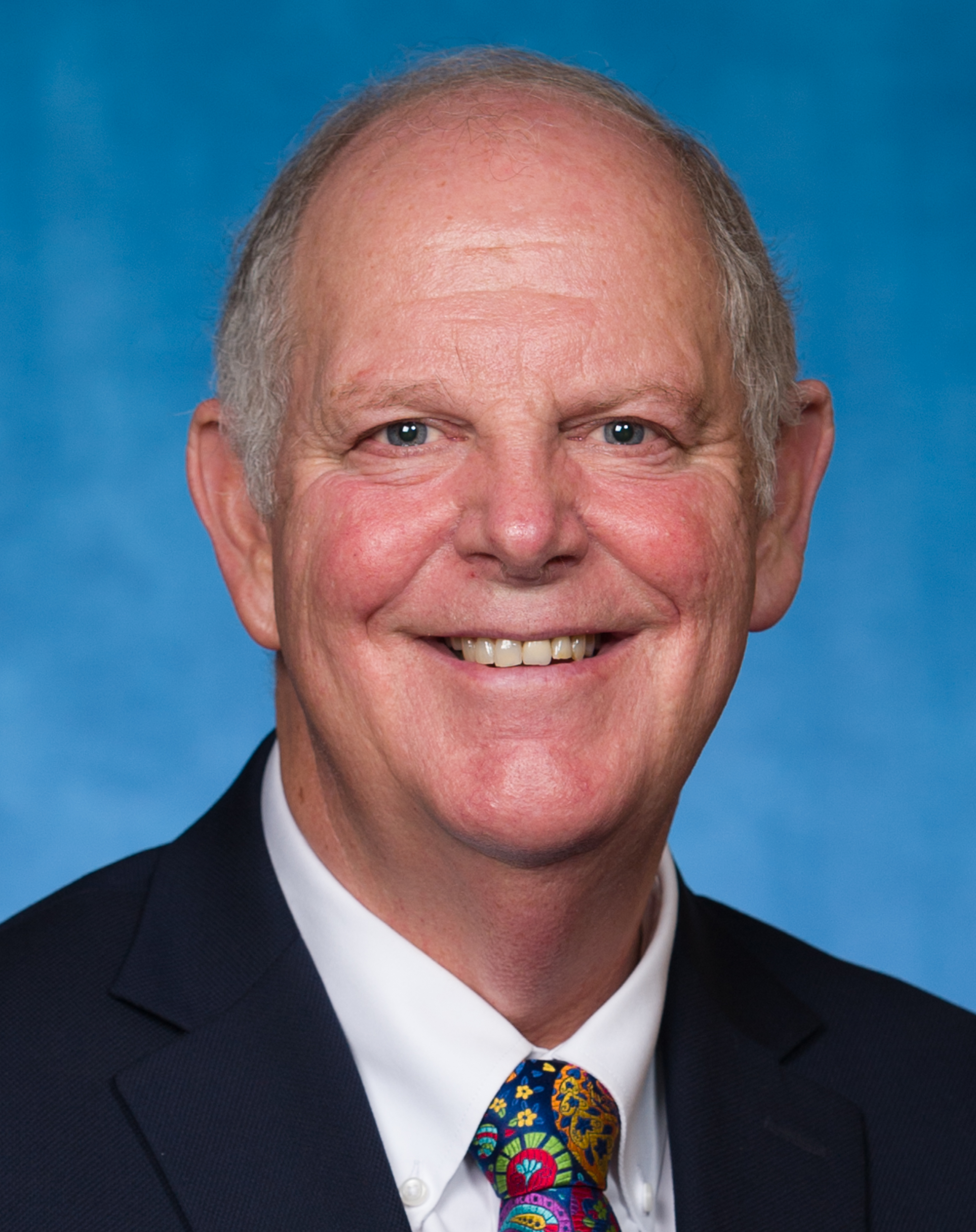

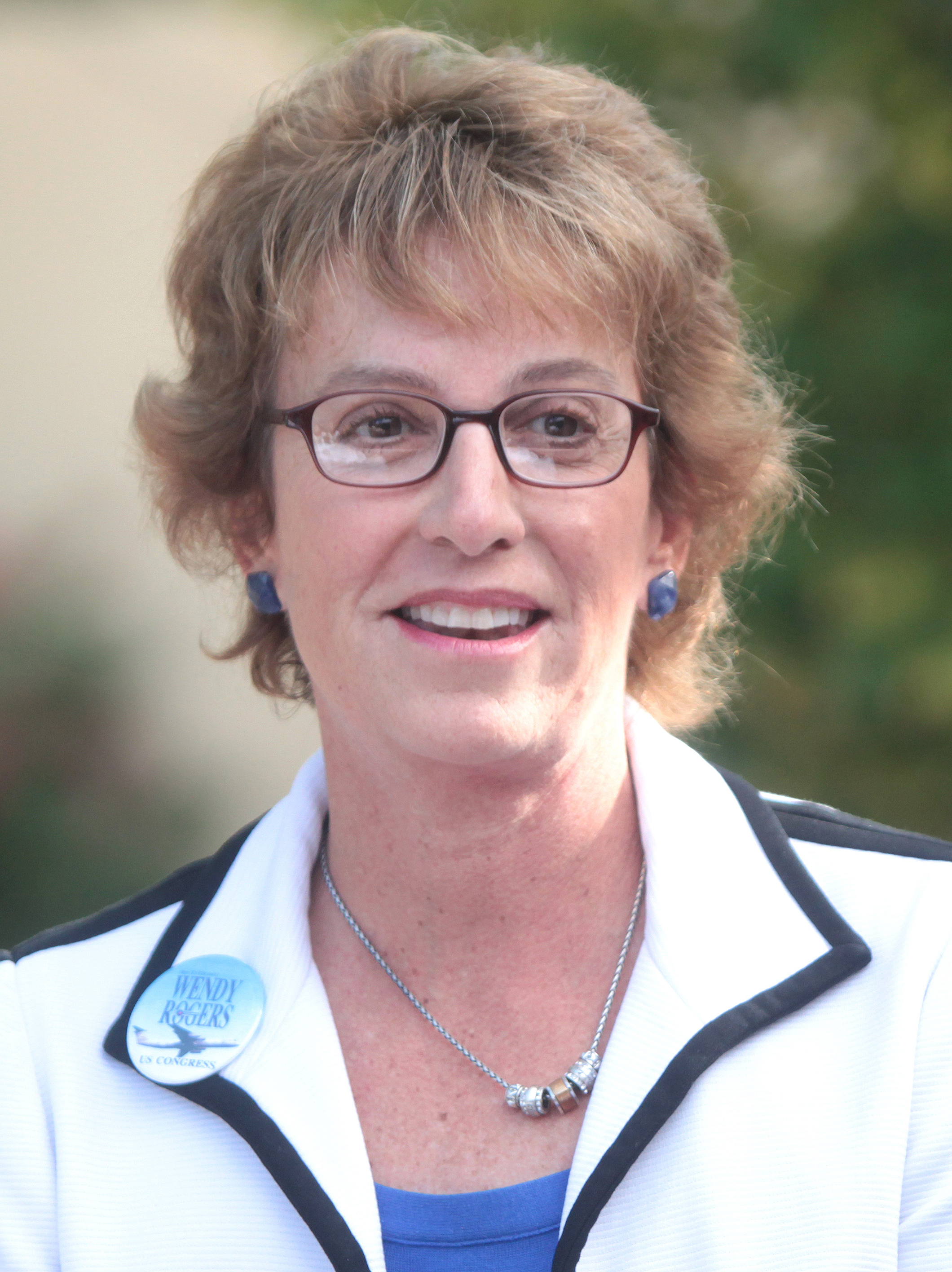
Nominee	Tom O'Halleran	Wendy Rogers
Party	Democratic	Republican
Popular vote	143,240	122,784
Percentage	53.8%	46.1%
- O'Halleran: 50–60% 60–70% 70–80% 80–90% ≥90% Rogers: 50–60% 60–70% 70–80% 80–90% ≥90% Tie: No votes
U.S. Representative before election
Tom O'Halleran
Democratic
Elected U.S. Representative
Tom O'Halleran
Democratic

The 1st district is home to the Grand Canyon and stretches along the eastern and northeastern portions of the state and includes Casa Grande, Flagstaff, and Marana. This district has a significant Native-American population, making up 25% of the population in the district. This district is home to a number of Indian reservations, including the Gila River Indian Community, Hopi Reservation, and the Navajo Nation. Incumbent Democrat Tom O'Halleran, who had represented the district since 2017, ran for re-election. He was elected with 51% of the vote in 2016, and the district had a PVI of R+2, making it one of the most competitive in the state with a PVI of R+2.

=== Democratic primary ===
==== Candidates ====
===== Nominee =====
- Tom O'Halleran, incumbent U.S. Representative

===== Withdrawn =====
- Miguel Olivas

==== Primary results ====
Democratic primary results
Party	Candidate	Votes	%
Democratic	Tom O'Halleran (incumbent)	64,114	100.0
Total votes		64,114	100.0

=== Republican primary ===
The district was one of 36 Democratic-held House districts targeted by the National Republican Congressional Committee.

==== Candidates ====
===== Nominee =====
- Wendy Rogers, retired air force pilot and perennial candidate

===== Eliminated in primary =====
- Tiffany Shedd, attorney
- Steve Smith, state senator

===== Declined =====
- T. J. Shope, state representative

==== Polling ====
Poll source	Date(s) administered	Sample size	Margin of error	Wendy Rogers	Tiffany Shedd	Steve Smith	Other	Undecided
Grassroots Partners (R-Smith)	July 15–16, 2018	393	± 4.6%	23%	15%	27%	–	–
Data Orbital (R-Defending Rural Arizona PAC)	June 28–30, 2018	450	± 4.59%	22%	15%	10%	3%	50%

==== Endorsements ====
Wendy Rogers

U.S. representatives

- Dana Rohrabacher, U.S. representative from California's 48th congressional district (1989–present)

Organizations

- Courageous Conservatives PAC
- Tea Party Nation
Tiffany Shedd

U.S. Senators

- Jon Kyl, former U.S. Senator (R-AZ)

U.S. representatives

- Susan Brooks, then-U.S. representative from Indiana's 5th congressional district (2013–2021)
- Mike Conaway, then-U.S. representative from Texas's 11th congressional district (2005–2021)
- Rick Crawford, U.S. representative from Arkansas's 1st congressional district (2011–present)
- Sean Duffy, then-U.S. representative from Wisconsin's 7th congressional district (2011–2019)
- John Faso, then-U.S. representative from New York's 19th congressional district (2017–2019)
- Karen Handel, then-U.S. representative from Georgia's 6th congressional district (2017–2019)
- Martha Roby, then-U.S. representative from Alabama's 2nd congressional district (2011–2021)
- Mike Rogers, U.S. representative from Alabama's 3rd congressional district (2003–present)
- Austin Scott, U.S. representative from Georgia's 8th congressional district (2011–present)
- Elise Stefanik, U.S. representative from New York's 21st congressional district (2015–present)
- Glenn Thompson, U.S. representative from Pennsylvania's 5th congressional district (2009–present)
- Ann Wagner, U.S. representative from Missouri's 2nd congressional district (2013–present)
- Jackie Walorski, then-U.S. representative from Indiana's 2nd congressional district (2013–2022)

State officials

- Michele Reagan, Secretary of State of Arizona

State legislators

- Tim Dunn, state representative
- Roger Hooper, former state representative
- Drew John, state representative
- Bill McGibbon, former state representative
- Steve Pierce, former state Sen. President

Organizations

- Maggie's List
Steve Smith

U.S. Senators

- Ted Cruz, U.S. Senator from Texas

U.S. representatives

- Andy Biggs, U.S. representative from Arizona's 5th congressional district (2017–present)
- Trent Franks, U.S. representative from Arizona's 8th congressional district (2003–2017)
- Barry Goldwater Jr., U.S. representative from California's 20th congressional district (1969–1983)
- Jim Jordan, U.S. representative from Ohio's 4th congressional district (2007–present) and House Freedom Caucus Chair
- Debbie Lesko, U.S. representative from Arizona's 8th congressional district (2018–present)
- Mark Meadows, U.S. representative from North Carolina's 11th congressional district (2013–present), and co-founder of the House Freedom Caucus

State officials

- Jeff DeWit, Arizona State Treasurer and Trump Campaign COO

State legislators

- John Allen, house majority leader
- Sylvia Allen, state senator
- Mark Finchem, state representative
- Gail Griffin, senate majority whip
- Drew John, state representative
- Adam Kwasman, former state representative
- Vince Leach, state representative
- J. D. Mesnard, house speaker
- Becky Nutt, state representative
- Bob Thorpe, state representative
- Kelly Townsend, house majority whip
- Steve Yarbrough, Senate President
- Kimberly Yee, senate majority leader

Organizations

- Family Research Council Action PAC
- Gun Owners of America
- National Border Patrol Council
- National Republican Congressional Committee
- Tea Party Express

Individuals

- Josh Bernstein, conservative talk show host
- David Bossie, deputy campaign manager for Donald Trump's 2016 presidential campaign

==== Primary results ====
Republican primary results
Party	Candidate	Votes	%
Republican	Wendy Rogers	30,180	43.7
Republican	Steve Smith	25,552	37.0
Republican	Tiffany Shedd	13,260	19.2
Total votes		68,992	100.0

=== Libertarian primary ===
==== Candidates ====
- Zhani Doko (write-in candidate)

=== General election ===
==== Endorsements ====
Tom O'Halleran (D)

Labor unions

- AFL-CIO
- Communications Workers of America
- International Brotherhood of Boilermakers
- International Brotherhood of Teamsters

Organizations

- Blue Dog Coalition
- Democratic Congressional Campaign Committee "Frontline" Program
- End Citizens United
- New Democrat Coalition

Newspapers

- Arizona Daily Star
Wendy Rogers (R)

U.S. representatives

- Dana Rohrabacher, U.S. representative from California's 48th congressional district (1989–present)

Organizations

- Courageous Conservatives PAC
- National Republican Congressional Committee "Young Guns" Program
- NRA Political Victory Fund
- Susan B. Anthony List
- Tea Party Nation

==== Polling ====
Poll source	Date(s) administered	Sample size	Margin of error	Tom O'Halleran (D)	Wendy Rogers (R)	Other	Undecided
0ptimus/DDHQ	October 31 – November 1, 2018	756	± 3.6%	48%	45%	1% (Note: "Will not vote" with 1%)	6%
American Viewpoint (R)	October 16–18, 2018	400	± 4.9%	46%	46%	–	5%
Go Right Strategies (R-Rogers)	October 9–10, 2018	943	± 3.0%	38%	44%	–	18%
Go Right Strategies (R-Rogers)	September 27–28, 2018	738	± 4.0%	36%	39%	–	24%

==== Predictions ====
Source	Ranking	As of
The Cook Political Report	Lean D	November 5, 2018
Inside Elections	Lean D	November 5, 2018
Sabato's Crystal Ball	Likely D	November 5, 2018
RCP	Tossup	November 5, 2018
Daily Kos	Likely D	November 5, 2018
538	Likely D	November 7, 2018
CNN	Lean D	October 31, 2018
Fox News	Lean D	September 21, 2018
Politico	Lean D	November 2, 2018

==== Results ====
Arizona's 1st congressional district, 2018
Party	Candidate	Votes	%
Democratic	Tom O'Halleran (incumbent)	143,240	53.8
Republican	Wendy Rogers	122,784	46.1
Independent	David Shock (write-in)	65	0.1
Majority		20,456	7.7
Total votes		266,089	100.0
Democratic hold			

== District 2 ==
2018 Arizona's 2nd congressional district election
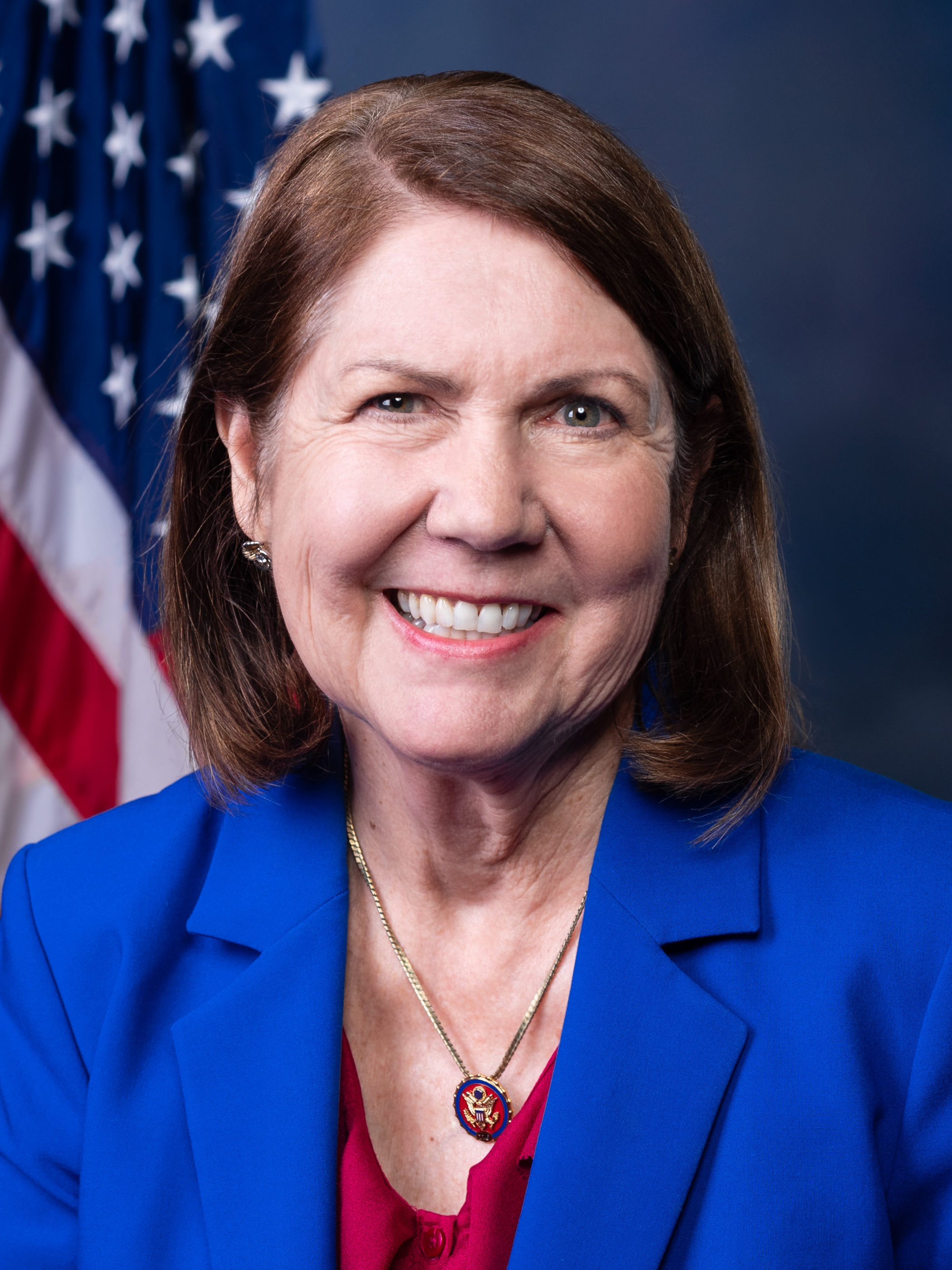

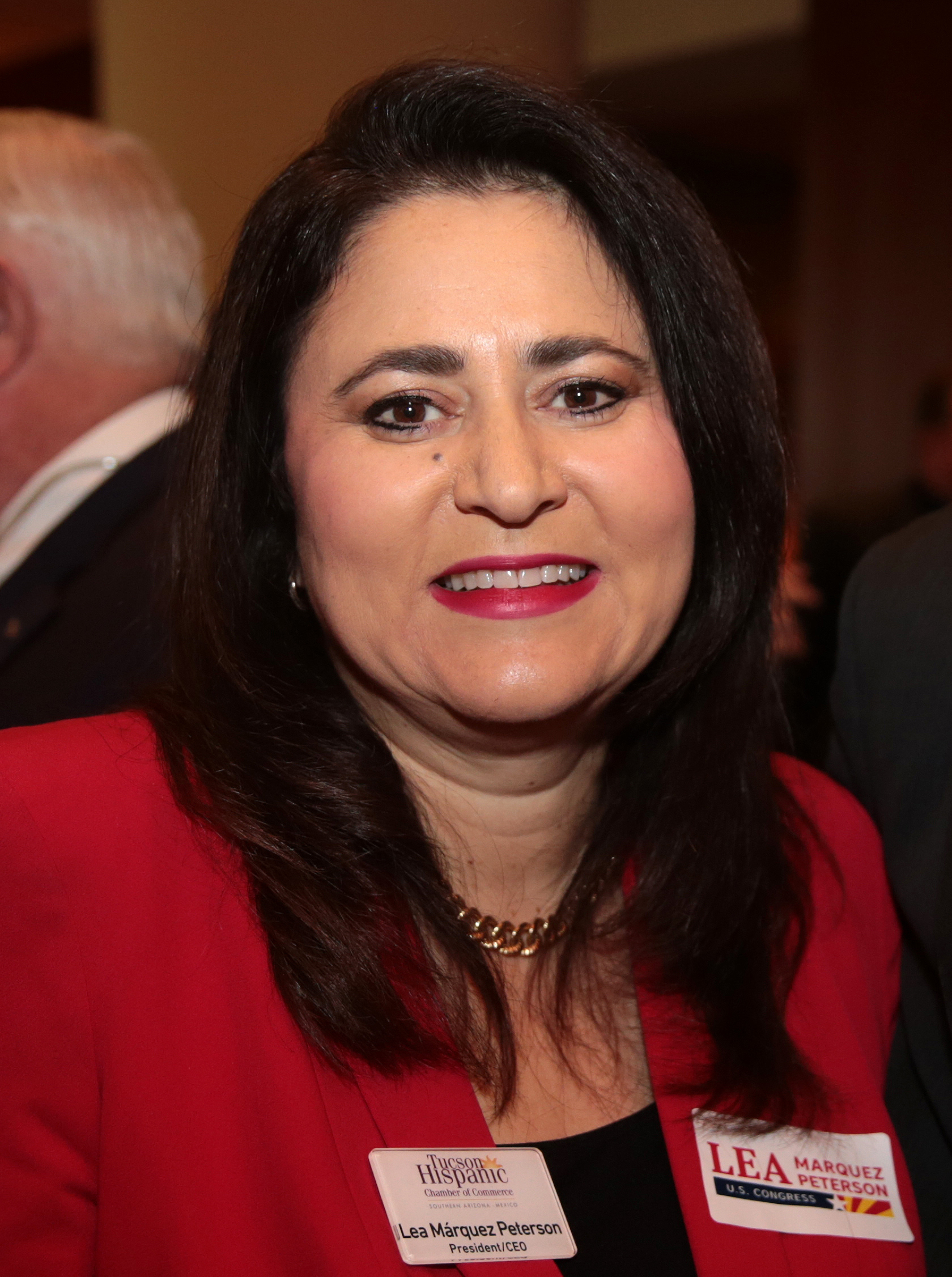
Nominee	Ann Kirkpatrick	Lea Márquez Peterson
Party	Democratic	Republican
Popular vote	161,000	133,083
Percentage	54.7%	45.2%
- County results Kirkpatrick: 50–60% Peterson: 50–60%
U.S. Representative before election
Martha McSally
Republican
Elected U.S. Representative
Ann Kirkpatrick
Democratic

The 2nd district is based in the southeastern corner of Arizona and includes Cochise County and parts of suburban Tucson. Incumbent Republican Martha McSally, who had represented the district since 2015, did not run for re-election, instead running for the U.S. Senate. She was re-elected with 57% of the vote in 2016, and the district had a PVI of R+1.

=== Republican primary ===
==== Candidates ====
===== Nominee =====
- Lea Márquez Peterson, president of the Tucson Hispanic Chamber of Commerce

===== Eliminated in primary =====
- Brandon Martin, Army instructor
- Danny Morales, former Douglas city councilman
- Casey Welch

==== Withdrew ====
- Martha McSally, incumbent U.S. Representative (ran for U.S. Senate)
- Marilyn Wiles

==== Declined ====
- J. Christopher Ackerley, former state representative
- Steve Christy, Pima County Supervisor
- Todd Clodfelter, state representative
- David Gowan, former state representative
- Gail Griffin, former state representative
- Shelley Kais, candidate for state senate in 2016
- Ally Miller, Pima County Supervisor
- Ethan Orr, former state representative

==== Primary results ====
Republican primary results
Party	Candidate	Votes	%
Republican	Lea Márquez Peterson	23,571	34.2
Republican	Brandon Martin	19,809	28.7
Republican	Casey Welch	14,499	21.0
Republican	Daniel Morales, Jr.	11,135	16.1
Total votes		69,014	100.0

=== Democratic primary ===
This district was one of 80 Republican-held House districts targeted by the Democratic Congressional Campaign Committee.

==== Candidates ====
===== Nominee =====
- Ann Kirkpatrick, former U.S. Representative for Arizona's 1st District and nominee for U.S. Senate in 2016

===== Eliminated in primary =====
- Matt Heinz, former state representative, candidate for 8th district in 2012 and nominee for this seat in 2016
- Billy Kovacs, operations manager of Hotel Congress
- Mary Matiella, former assistant secretary of the Army
- Barbara Sherry
- Bruce Wheeler, former state representative
- Yahya Yuksel

===== Withdrawn =====
- Charlie Verdin, small businessman

===== Declined =====
- Brian Bickel, candidate for Pima County Supervisor in 2016
- Randall Friese, state representative
- Lou Jordan, retired U.S. Army colonel
- Jeff Latas, retired air force fighter pilot and candidate for AZ-08 in 2006
- Joshua Polacheck, foreign service officer
- Victoria Steele, former state representative and candidate for this seat in 2016

==== Endorsements ====
Matt Heinz

U.S. Senators

- Dennis DeConcini, former U.S. Senator (D-AZ)

State legislators

- Olivia Cajero Bedford, state senator
- David Bradley, state senator
- Daniel Hernández Jr., state representative

Labor unions

- American Federation of Teachers
- International Association of Machinists and Aerospace Workers
- International Brotherhood of Electrical Workers

Organizations

- Victory Fund
Ann Kirkpatrick

U.S. representatives

- Ron Barber, U.S. representative from Arizona's 2nd congressional district (2012–2015)
- Ruben Gallego, U.S. representative from Arizona's 7th congressional district (2015–present)
- Gabby Giffords, U.S. representative from Arizona's 8th congressional district (2007–2012)

State legislators

- Andrea Dalessandro, state senator
- Randy Friese, state representative

Labor unions

- Air Line Pilots Association
- American Federation of State, County and Municipal Employees
- American Physical Therapy Association
- American Postal Workers Union
- American Society of Anesthesiologists
- Association of Professional Flight Attendants
- International Alliance Theatrical Stage Employees
- International Association of Bridge, Structural, Ornamental and Reinforcing Iron Workers
- International Association of Sheet Metal, Air, Rail and Transportation Workers
- International Brotherhood of Boilermakers
- International Brotherhood of Teamsters
- International Union of Operating Engineers
- Laborers’ International Union of North America
- Marine Engineers' Beneficial Association
- National Air Traffic Controllers Association
- National Association of Letter Carriers
- National Association of Postal Supervisors
- Professional Aviation Safety Specialists
- Transport Workers Union of America
- UNITE HERE
- United Association
- United Food and Commercial Workers International Union
- United Transportation Union

Organizations

- American Association for Justice
- Council for a Livable World
- EMILY's List
- End Citizens United
- Feminist Majority
- NARAL Pro-Choice America
- National Committee to Preserve Social Security and Medicare
- National Organization for Women
- New Democrat Coalition
- Planned Parenthood Action Fund
- Stonewall Democrats of Arizona
Mary Matiella

Organizations

- Justice Democrats

==== Polling ====
Poll source	Date(s) administered	Sample size	Margin of error	Randy Friese	Matt Heinz	Ann Kirkpatrick	Billy Kovacs	Mary Matiella	Bruce Wheeler	Other	Undecided
FM3 Research (D-Heinz)	August 1–2, 2018	402	± 4.9%	–	31%	26%	–	–	–	13%	29%
FM3 Research (D-Heinz)	April 29 – May 3, 2018	400	± 4.9%	–	27%	23%	4%	6%	4%	–	36%
Public Policy Polling (D-Heinz)	May 5–7, 2017	392	± 5.0%	6%	40%	30%	–	–	–	–	24%

==== Primary results ====
Democratic primary results
Party	Candidate	Votes	%
Democratic	Ann Kirkpatrick	33,938	41.8
Democratic	Matt Heinz	23,992	29.6
Democratic	Mary Matiella	7,606	9.4
Democratic	Bruce Wheeler	6,814	8.4
Democratic	Billy Kovacs	5,350	6.6
Democratic	Barbara Sherry	2,074	2.6
Democratic	Yahya Yuksel	1,319	1.6
Total votes		81,093	100.0

=== General election ===
==== Endorsements ====
Lea Márquez Peterson (R)

Organizations

- BIPAC
- Maggie's List
- National Republican Congressional Committee "Young Guns" Program
Ann Kirkpatrick (D)

U.S. representatives

- Ron Barber, U.S. representative from Arizona's 2nd congressional district (2012–2015)
- Ruben Gallego, U.S. representative from Arizona's 7th congressional district (2015–present)
- Gabby Giffords, U.S. representative from Arizona's 8th congressional district (2007–2012)

State legislators

- Andrea Dalessandro, state senator
- Randy Friese, state representative

Labor unions

- AFL-CIO
- Air Line Pilots Association
- American Federation of State, County and Municipal Employees
- American Physical Therapy Association
- American Postal Workers Union
- American Society of Anesthesiologists
- Association of Professional Flight Attendants
- Communications Workers of America
- International Alliance Theatrical Stage Employees
- International Association of Bridge, Structural, Ornamental and Reinforcing Iron Workers
- International Association of Sheet Metal, Air, Rail and Transportation Workers
- International Brotherhood of Boilermakers
- International Brotherhood of Teamsters
- International Union of Operating Engineers
- Laborers’ International Union of North America
- Marine Engineers' Beneficial Association
- National Air Traffic Controllers Association
- National Association of Letter Carriers
- National Association of Postal Supervisors
- Professional Aviation Safety Specialists
- Transport Workers Union of America
- UNITE HERE
- United Association
- United Food and Commercial Workers International Union
- United Transportation Union

Organizations

- American Association for Justice
- Council for a Livable World
- Democratic Congressional Campaign Committee "Red to Blue" Program
- EMILY's List
- End Citizens United
- Everytown for Gun Safety
- Feminist Majority
- MoveOn
- NARAL Pro-Choice America
- National Committee to Preserve Social Security and Medicare
- National Organization for Women
- New Democrat Coalition
- Planned Parenthood Action Fund
- Stonewall Democrats of Arizona

Newspapers

- Arizona Daily Star

==== Debates ====
- Complete video of debate, October 11, 2018

==== Polling ====
Poll source	Date(s) administered	Sample size	Margin of error	Lea Marquez-Peterson (R)	Ann Kirkpatrick (D)	Undecided
NYT Upshot/Siena College	September 26 – October 1, 2018	502	± 4.5%	39%	50%	11%
Public Policy Polling (D-Heinz)	February 8–10, 2018	841	± 3.4%	34%	43%	23%

Hypothetical polling

With Heinz

Poll source	Date(s) administered	Sample size	Margin of error	Lea Marquez-Peterson (R)	Matt Heinz (D)	Undecided
Public Policy Polling (D-Heinz)	February 8–10, 2018	841	± 3.4%	31%	45%	24%

Poll source	Date(s) administered	Sample size	Margin of error	Martha McSally (R)	Matt Heinz (D)	Undecided
Public Policy Polling (D-Heinz)	May 5–7, 2017	944	± N/A	44%	48%	8%

Poll source	Date(s) administered	Sample size	Margin of error	Martha McSally (R)	Ann Kirkpatrick (D)	Undecided
Public Policy Polling (D)	October 6–8, 2017	714	± 3.7%	44%	44%	—
Public Policy Polling (D-Heinz)	May 5–7, 2017	944	± N/A	44%	48%	8%

==== Predictions ====
Source	Ranking	As of
The Cook Political Report	Lean D (flip)	November 5, 2018
Inside Elections	Lean D (flip)	November 5, 2018
Sabato's Crystal Ball	Likely D (flip)	November 5, 2018
RCP	Lean D (flip)	November 5, 2018
Daily Kos	Likely D (flip)	November 5, 2018
538	Safe D (flip)	November 7, 2018
CNN	Likely D (flip)	October 31, 2018
Fox News	Lean D (flip)	September 21, 2018
Politico	Lean D (flip)	November 2, 2018

==== Results ====
Arizona's 2nd congressional district, 2018
Party	Candidate	Votes	%
Democratic	Ann Kirkpatrick	161,000	54.7
Republican	Lea Márquez Peterson	133,083	45.2
Independent	Jordan Flayer (write-in)	50	0.1
Republican	Melissa Grable (write-in)	19	0.0
Majority		27,917	9.5
Total votes		294,152	100.0
Democratic gain from Republican			

== District 3 ==
2018 Arizona's 3rd congressional district election
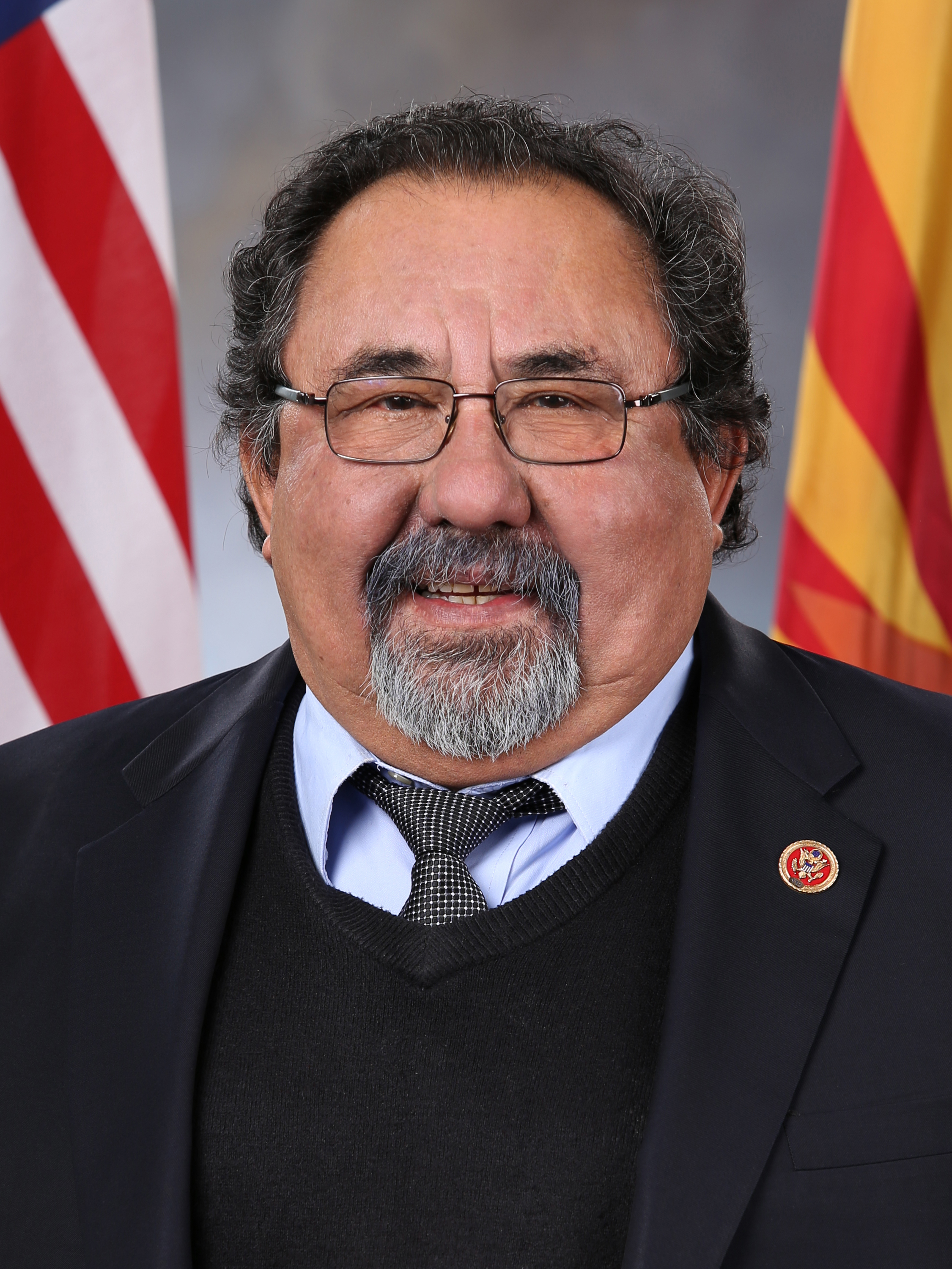

Nominee	Raúl Grijalva	Nicolas Pierson
Party	Democratic	Republican
Popular vote	114,650	64,868
Percentage	63.9%	36.1%
- Grijalva: 50–60% 60–70% 70–80% 80–90% >90% Pierson: 50–60% 60–70% 70–80% 80–90% No votes
U.S. Representative before election
Raúl Grijalva
Democratic
Elected U.S. Representative
Raúl Grijalva
Democratic

The third district is based in Tucson and stretches along the southern border of Arizona including Yuma, rural portions of Maricopa County such as Gila Bend, and the western suburbs of Phoenix including Avondale, Buckeye, Goodyear, and parts of Litchfield Park. has represented this district since 2002, and ran unopposed in 2016. Incumbent Democrat Raúl Grijalva, who had represented the district since 2003, ran for re-election. He was re-elected with 99% of the vote in 2016, and the district had a PVI of D+13.

=== Democratic primary ===
==== Candidates ====
===== Nominee =====
- Raúl Grijalva, incumbent U.S. Representative

===== Eliminated in primary =====
- Joshua Garcia (write-in candidate)

==== Endorsements ====
Raúl Grijalva

Labor unions

- International Brotherhood of Teamsters

==== Primary results ====
Democratic primary results
Party	Candidate	Votes	%
Democratic	Raúl Grijalva (incumbent)	45,186	99.8
Write-in		81	0.2
Total votes		45,267	100.0

=== Republican primary ===
==== Candidates ====
===== Nominee =====
- J. Nicholas Pierson, financial planner and community organizer

===== Eliminated in primary =====
- Sergio Arellano, veteran
- Edna San Miguel, schoolteacher

===== Withdrawn =====
- Bill Abatecola, businessman (endorsed Arellano)

==== Primary results ====
Republican primary results
Party	Candidate	Votes	%
Republican	J. Nicholas Pierson	13,090	49.9
Republican	Sergio Arellano	7,400	28.2
Republican	Edna San Miguel	5,756	21.9
Total votes		26,246	100.0

=== General election ===
==== Predictions ====
Source	Ranking	As of
The Cook Political Report	Safe D	November 5, 2018
Inside Elections	Safe D	November 5, 2018
Sabato's Crystal Ball	Safe D	November 5, 2018
RCP	Safe D	November 5, 2018
Daily Kos	Safe D	November 5, 2018
538	Safe D	November 7, 2018
CNN	Safe D	October 31, 2018
Fox News	Safe D	September 21, 2018
Politico	Safe D	November 2, 2018

==== Endorsements ====
Raúl Grijalva (D)

Labor unions

- AFL-CIO
- Communications Workers of America
- International Brotherhood of Teamsters

Organizations

- Congressional Progressive Caucus
- End Citizens United
- Justice Democrats
- Stonewall Democrats of Arizona

Newspapers

- Arizona Daily Star

==== Results ====
Arizona's 3rd congressional district, 2018
Party	Candidate	Votes	%
Democratic	Raúl Grijalva (incumbent)	114,650	63.9
Republican	Nicolas Pierson	64,868	36.1
Majority		49,782	27.8
Total votes		179,518	100.0
Democratic hold			

== District 4 ==
2018 Arizona's 4th congressional district election
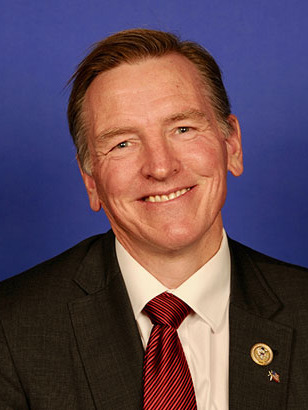

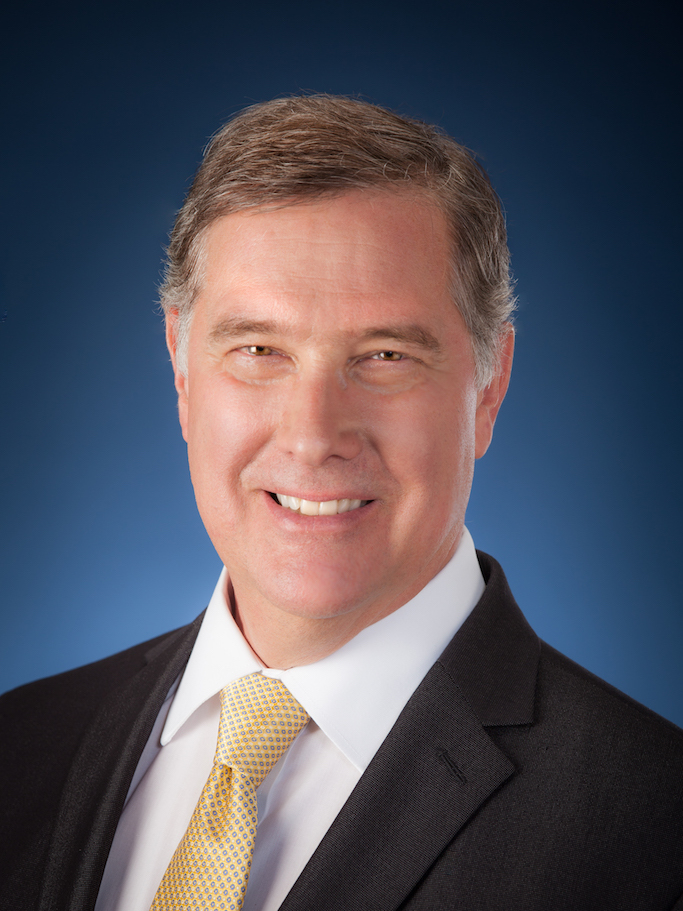
Nominee	Paul Gosar	David Brill
Party	Republican	Democratic
Popular vote	278,002	120,484
Percentage	68.2%	30.5%
- Gosar: 50–60% 60–70% 70–80% 80–90% >90% Brill: 50–60% 60–70% No votes
U.S. Representative before election
Paul Gosar
Republican
Elected U.S. Representative
Paul Gosar
Republican

The fourth district takes up most of rural northwestern and western Arizona and includes Kingman, Lake Havasu City, Prescott, and San Tan Valley. Incumbent Republican Paul Gosar, who had represented the district since 2011, ran for re-election. He was re-elected with 71% of the vote in 2016, and the district had a PVI of R+21, making it the most Republican district in Arizona.

=== Republican primary ===
==== Candidates ====
===== Nominee =====
- Paul Gosar, incumbent U.S. Representative

==== Primary results ====
Republican primary results
Party	Candidate	Votes	%
Republican	Paul Gosar (incumbent)	94,092	100.0
Total votes		94,092	100.0

=== Democratic primary ===
==== Candidates ====
===== Nominee =====
- David Brill, Manager of Primary Care services for the Northern Arizona Veterans Administration

===== Eliminated in primary =====
- Delina Disanto, finance director and registered nurse
- Ana Maria Perez (write-in candidate)

==== Endorsements ====
David Brill

Labor unions

- International Brotherhood of Teamsters

==== Primary results ====
Democratic primary results
Party	Candidate	Votes	%
Democratic	David Brill	19,048	52.4
Democratic	Delina Disanto	17,256	47.5
Write-in		49	0.1
Total votes		36,353	100.0

=== Green primary ===
==== Candidates ====
===== Nominee =====
- Haryaksha Gregor Knauer

==== Primary results ====
Green primary results
Party	Candidate	Votes	%
Green	Haryaksha Gregor Knauer	323	100.0
Total votes		323	100.0

=== General election ===
==== Predictions ====
Source	Ranking	As of
The Cook Political Report	Safe R	November 5, 2018
Inside Elections	Safe R	November 5, 2018
Sabato's Crystal Ball	Safe R	November 5, 2018
RCP	Safe R	November 5, 2018
Daily Kos	Safe R	November 5, 2018
538	Safe R	November 7, 2018
CNN	Safe R	October 31, 2018
Fox News	Safe R	September 21, 2018
Politico	Safe R	November 2, 2018

==== Campaign ====
This race received national media coverage after Democratic nominee David Brill aired television advertisements in which six of Republican incumbent Paul Gosar's nine siblings each condemned their brother and endorsed Brill, imploring residents of the fourth district to vote their brother out of office. Gosar responded to this advert with a tweet in which he dismissed his siblings' criticisms and characterized them as "disgruntled Hillary supporters" who "put political ideology before family".

==== Endorsements ====
Paul Gosar (R)

Organizations

- House Freedom Caucus
David Brill (D)

Labor unions

- AFL-CIO
- International Brotherhood of Teamsters

Organizations

- Indivisible

==== Polling ====
Poll source	Date(s) administered	Sample size	Margin of error	Paul Gosar (R)	David Brill (D)	Haryaksha Gregor Knauer (G)	Undecided
OH Predictive Insights	September 25, 2018	370	± 5.09%	57%	25%	2%	16%

==== Results ====
Arizona's 4th congressional district, 2018
Party	Candidate	Votes	%
Republican	Paul Gosar (incumbent)	188,842	68.2
Democratic	David Brill	84,521	30.5
Green	Haryaksha Gregor Knauer	3,672	1.3
Majority		104,321	37.7
Total votes		277,035	100.0
Republican hold			

== District 5 ==
2018 Arizona's 5th congressional district election
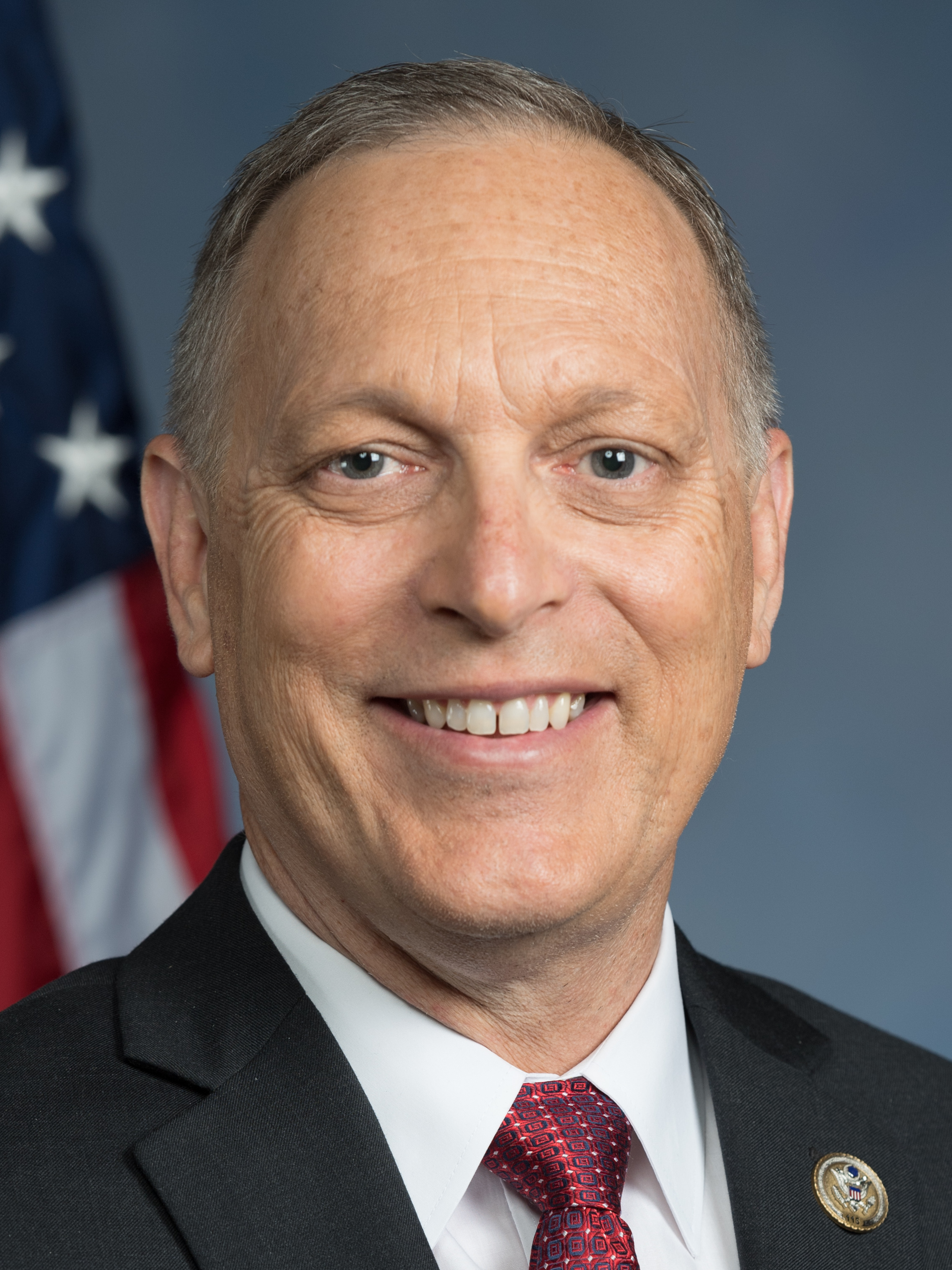

Nominee	Andy Biggs	Joan Greene
Party	Republican	Democratic
Popular vote	186,037	127,027
Percentage	59.4%	40.6%
- Precinct results Biggs: 50–60% 60–70% 70–80% Greene: 50–60% 60–70%
U.S. Representative before election
Andy Biggs
Republican
Elected U.S. Representative
Andy Biggs
Republican

The 5th district is based in the East Valley region of suburban Phoenix and includes Gilbert and Queen Creek, as well as portions of Chandler and Mesa. Incumbent Republican Andy Biggs, who had represented the district since 2017, ran for re-election. He was elected with 64% of the vote in 2016, and the district had a PVI of R+15.

=== Republican primary ===
==== Candidates ====
===== Nominee =====
- Andy Biggs, incumbent U.S. Representative

==== Primary results ====
Republican primary results
Party	Candidate	Votes	%
Republican	Andy Biggs (incumbent)	86,418	100.0
Total votes		86,418	100.0

=== Democratic primary ===
==== Candidates ====
===== Nominee =====
- Joan Greene, business owner

===== Eliminated in primary =====
- Jose Torres, engineer and businessman

===== Withdrawn =====
- Lisa Chappelle
- Tony Margalis
- Scott Menor

==== Endorsements ====
Joan Greene

Labor unions

- International Brotherhood of Teamsters

Organizations

- Stonewall Democrats of Arizona

==== Primary results ====
Democratic primary results
Party	Candidate	Votes	%
Democratic	Joan Greene	27,222	59.3
Democratic	Jose Torres	18,671	40.7
Total votes		45,893	100.0

=== General election ===
==== Predictions ====
Source	Ranking	As of
The Cook Political Report	Safe R	November 5, 2018
Inside Elections	Safe R	November 5, 2018
Sabato's Crystal Ball	Safe R	November 5, 2018
RCP	Safe R	November 5, 2018
Daily Kos	Safe R	November 5, 2018
538	Safe R	November 7, 2018
CNN	Safe R	October 31, 2018
Fox News	Safe R	September 21, 2018
Politico	Safe R	November 2, 2018

==== Endorsements ====
Andy Biggs (R)

Organizations

- House Freedom Caucus
Joan Greene (D)

Labor unions

- AFL-CIO
- International Brotherhood of Teamsters

Organizations

- Stonewall Democrats of Arizona

==== Results ====
Arizona's 5th congressional district, 2018
Party	Candidate	Votes	%
Republican	Andy Biggs (incumbent)	186,037	59.4
Democratic	Joan Greene	127,027	40.6
Majority		59,010	18.8
Total votes		313,064	100.0
Republican hold			

== District 6 ==
2018 Arizona's 6th congressional district election
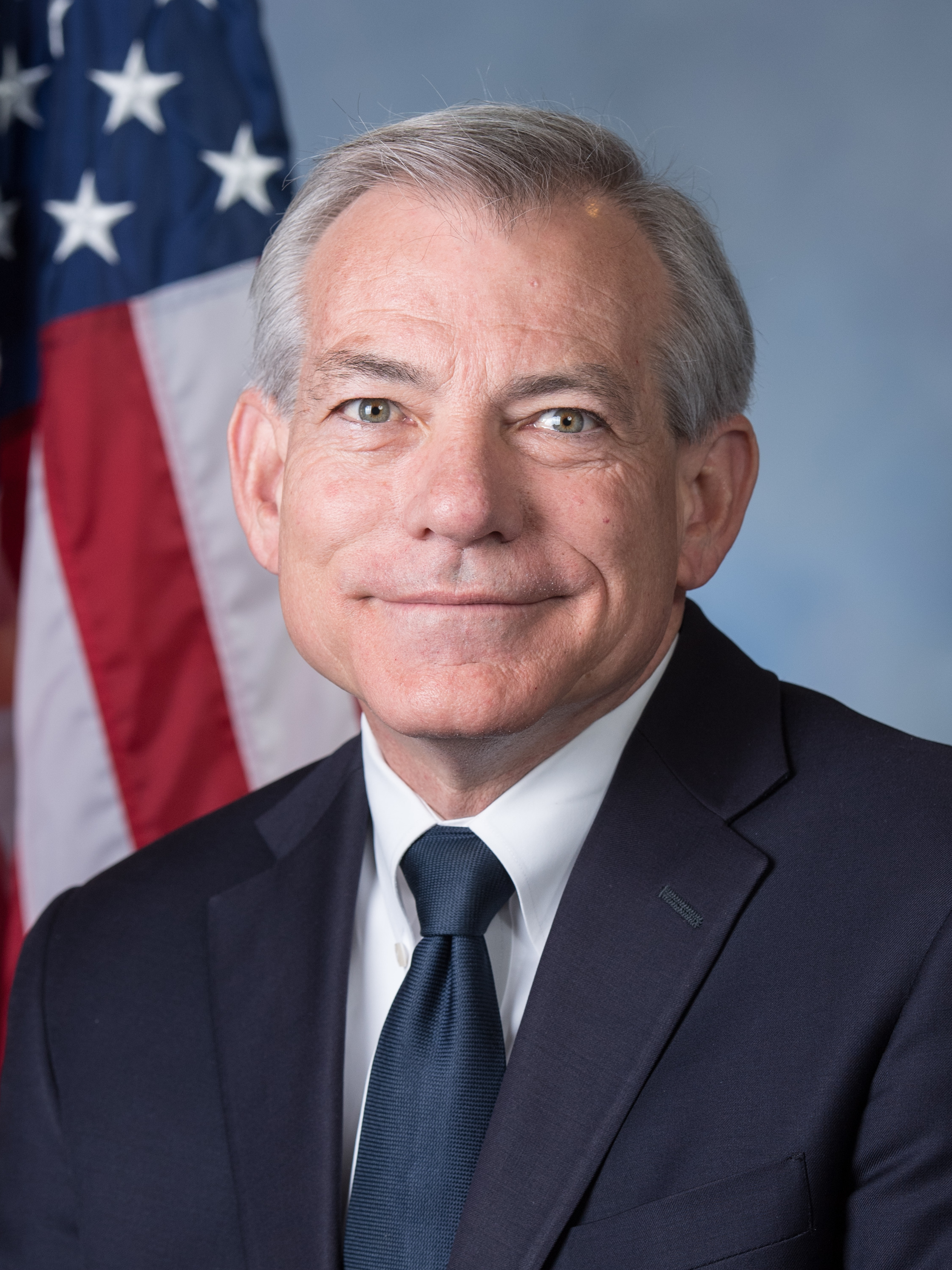

Nominee	David Schweikert	Anita Malik
Party	Republican	Democratic
Popular vote	173,140	140,559
Percentage	55.2%	44.8%
- Precinct results Schweikert: 50–60% 60–70% 70–80% Malik: 50–60% 60–70% 70–80% No votes
U.S. Representative before election
David Schweikert
Republican
Elected U.S. Representative
David Schweikert
Republican

The sixth district is based in northeastern suburban Phoenix and is centered around Scottsdale, and also includes many affluent communities such as Fountain Hills and Paradise Valley. Incumbent Republican David Schweikert, who had represented the district since 2011, ran for re-election. He was re-elected with 62% of the vote in 2016, and the district had a PVI of R+9.

=== Republican primary ===
==== Candidates ====
===== Nominee =====
- David Schweikert, incumbent U.S. Representative

==== Primary results ====
Republican primary results
Party	Candidate	Votes	%
Republican	David Schweikert (incumbent)	83,406	100.0
Total votes		83,406	100.0

=== Democratic primary ===
This district was one of 80 Republican-held House districts targeted by the Democratic Congressional Campaign Committee.

==== Candidates ====
===== Nominee =====
- Anita Malik, tech executive

===== Eliminated in primary =====
- Garrick McFadden, attorney
- Heather Ross, nurse practitioner

==== Endorsements ====
Garrick McFadden

Labor unions

- International Brotherhood of Teamsters

==== Primary results ====
Democratic primary results
Party	Candidate	Votes	%
Democratic	Anita Malik	22,666	42.2
Democratic	Heather Ross	20,203	37.6
Democratic	Garrick McFadden	10,825	20.2
Total votes		53,694	100.0

=== General election ===
==== Endorsements ====
David Schweikert (R)

Organizations

- House Freedom Caucus
Anita Malik (D)

Labor unions

- AFL-CIO
- International Brotherhood of Boilermakers
- International Brotherhood of Teamsters

Organizations

- End Citizens United
- Indivisible
- MoveOn
- Stonewall Democrats of Arizona

==== Polling ====
Poll source	Date(s) administered	Sample size	Margin of error	David Schweikert (R)	Anita Malik (D)	Undecided
NYT Upshot/Siena College	October 11–15, 2018	500	± 4.5%	50%	36%	14%

==== Predictions ====
Source	Ranking	As of
The Cook Political Report	Likely R	November 5, 2018
Inside Elections	Safe R	November 5, 2018
Sabato's Crystal Ball	Likely R	November 5, 2018
RCP	Likely R	November 5, 2018
Daily Kos	Safe R	November 5, 2018
538	Likely R	November 7, 2018
CNN	Likely R	October 31, 2018
Politico	Likely R	September 21, 2018

==== Results ====
Arizona's 6th congressional district, 2018
Party	Candidate	Votes	%
Republican	David Schweikert (incumbent)	173,140	55.2
Democratic	Anita Malik	140,559	44.8
Majority		32,581	10.4
Total votes		313,699	100.0
Republican hold			

== District 7 ==
2018 Arizona's 7th congressional district election
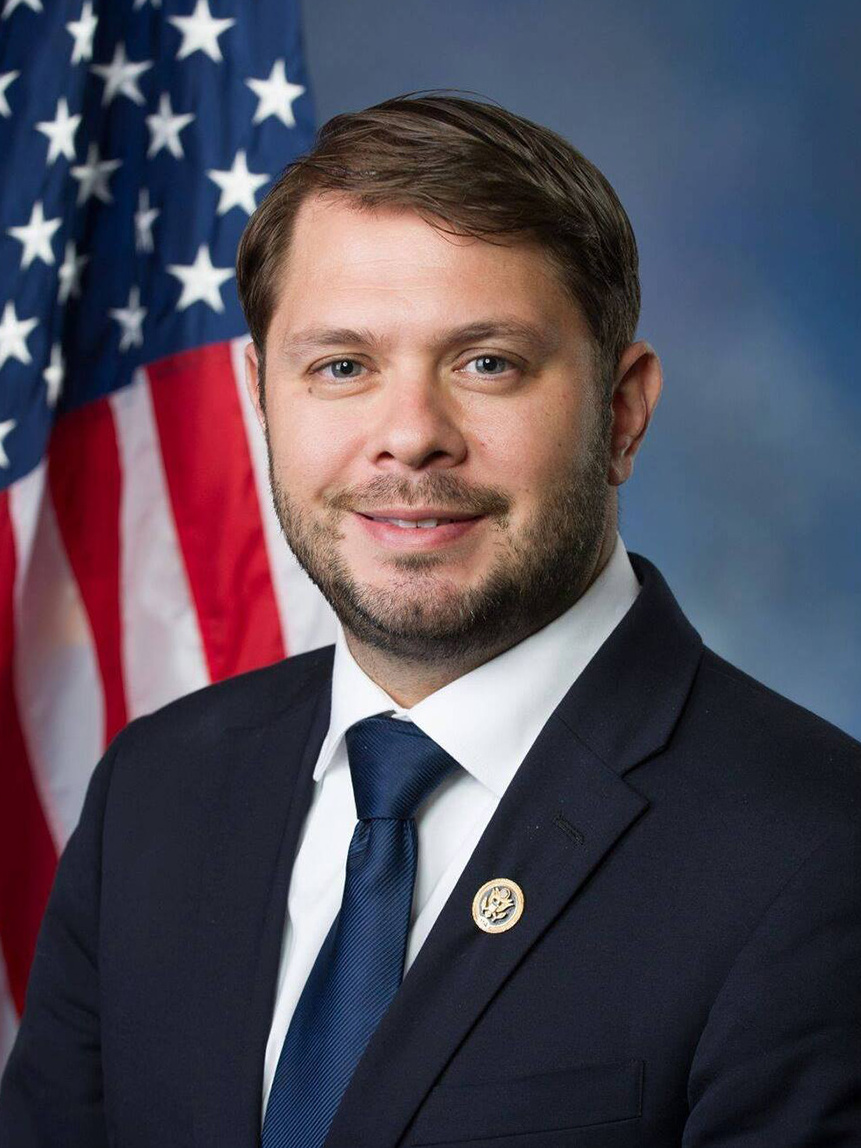

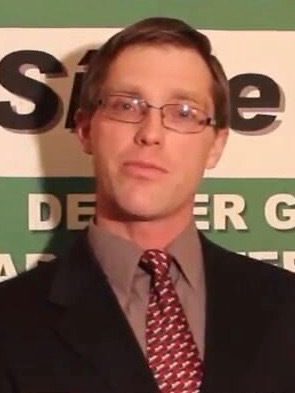
Nominee	Ruben Gallego	Gary Swing
Party	Democratic	Green
Popular vote	114,650	18,706
Percentage	85.6%	14.2%
U.S. Representative before election
Ruben Gallego
Democratic
Elected U.S. Representative
Ruben Gallego
Democratic

The seventh district is based in the city of Phoenix and also includes parts of Glendale and Tolleson. Incumbent Democrat Ruben Gallego, who had represented the district since 2015, ran for re-election. He was re-elected with 75% of the vote in 2016, and the district had a PVI of D+23, making it the most Democratic district in Arizona.

=== Democratic primary ===
==== Candidates ====
===== Nominee =====
- Ruben Gallego, incumbent

===== Eliminated in primary =====
- Catherine Miranda, state senator

==== Endorsements ====
Ruben Gallego

Labor unions

- International Brotherhood of Teamsters

Organizations

- Stonewall Democrats of Arizona

==== Primary results ====
Democratic primary results
Party	Candidate	Votes	%
Democratic	Ruben Gallego (incumbent)	32,231	74.8
Democratic	Catherine Miranda	10,856	25.2
Total votes		43,087	100.0

=== Republican primary ===
No Republican candidate filed to run.

=== General election ===
==== Predictions ====
Source	Ranking	As of
The Cook Political Report	Safe D	November 5, 2018
Inside Elections	Safe D	November 5, 2018
Sabato's Crystal Ball	Safe D	November 5, 2018
RCP	Safe D	November 5, 2018
Daily Kos	Safe D	November 5, 2018
538	Safe D	November 7, 2018
CNN	Safe D	October 31, 2018
Fox News	Safe D	September 21, 2018
Politico	Safe D	November 2, 2018

==== Endorsements ====
Ruben Gallego (D)

Labor unions

- AFL-CIO
- Communications Workers of America
- International Brotherhood of Boilermakers
- International Brotherhood of Teamsters

Organizations

- Congressional Progressive Caucus
- End Citizens United
- Stonewall Democrats of Arizona
- VoteVets

==== Results ====
Arizona's 7th congressional district, 2018
Party	Candidate	Votes	%
Democratic	Ruben Gallego (incumbent)	113,044	85.6
Green	Gary Swing	18,706	14.2
Republican	James "007" Bond IV (write-in)	301	0.2
Majority		794,338	71.4
Total votes		132,051	100.0
Democratic hold			

== District 8 ==
2018 Arizona's 8th congressional district election
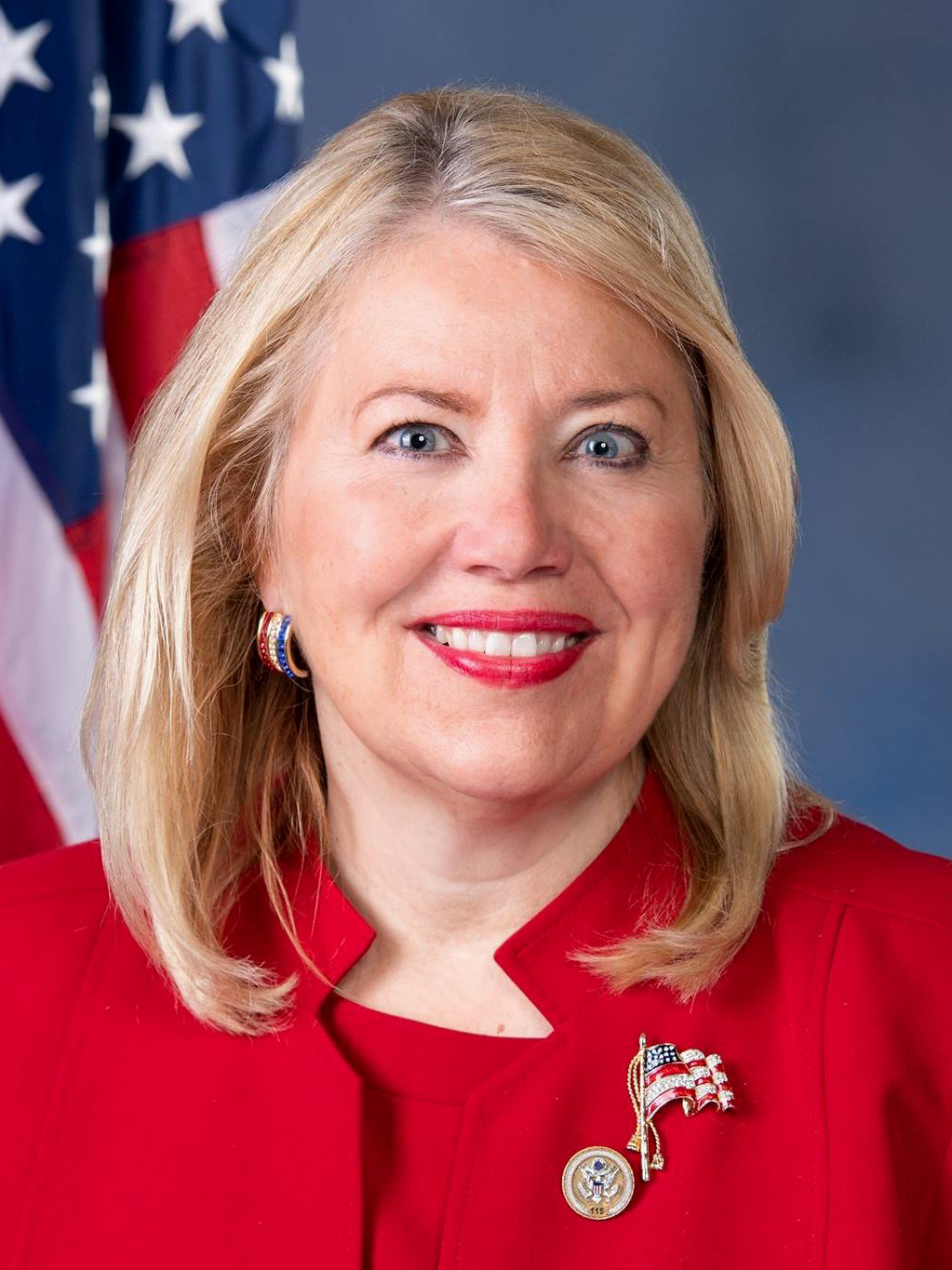

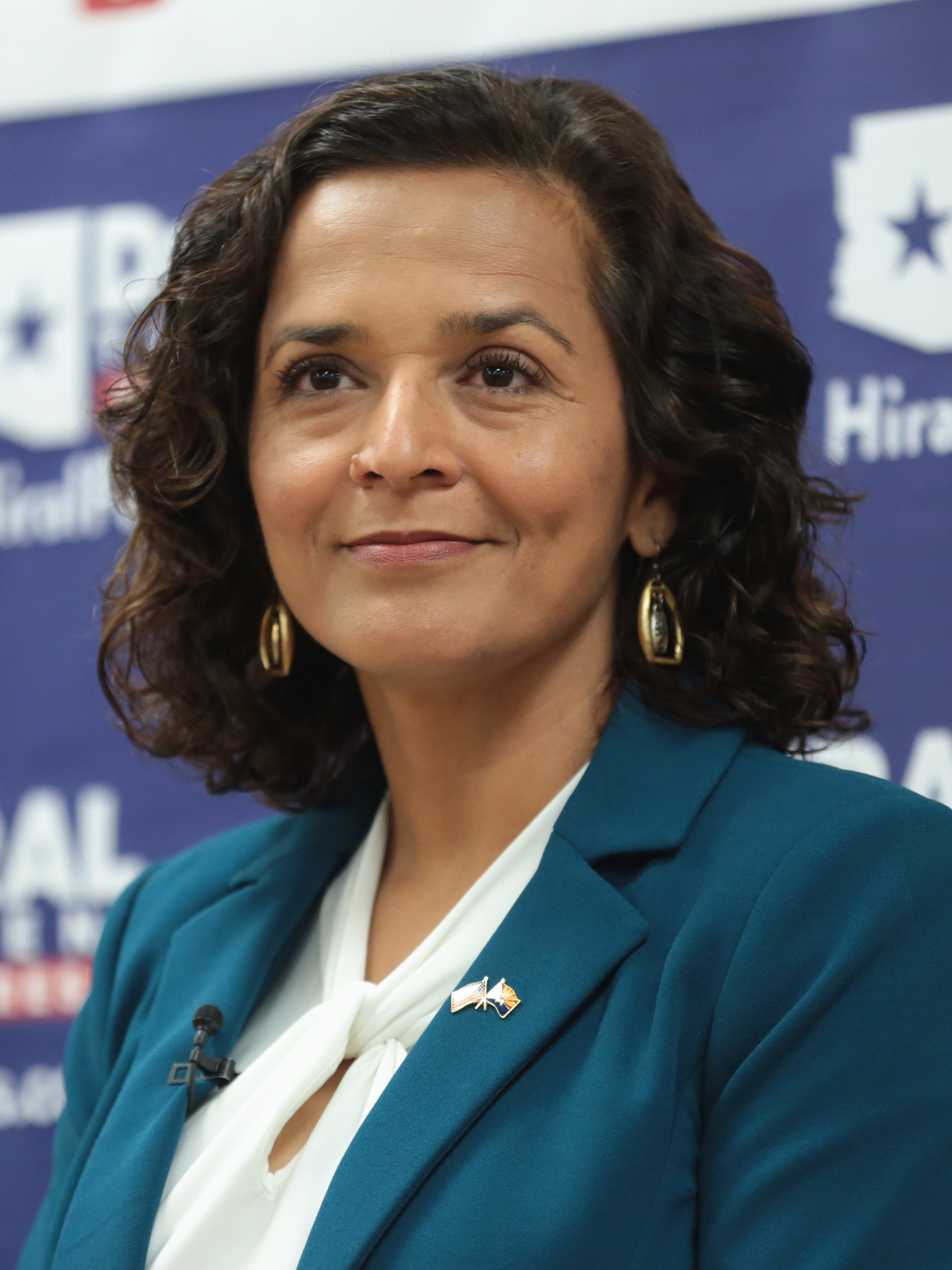
Nominee	Debbie Lesko	Hiral Tipirneni
Party	Republican	Democratic
Popular vote	168,835	135,569
Percentage	55.5%	44.5%
- Precinct results Lesko: 50–60% 60–70% 70–80% Tipirneni: 40–50% 50–60% 60–70% No votes
U.S. Representative before election
Debbie Lesko
Republican
Elected U.S. Representative
Debbie Lesko
Republican

The eighth district is based in the West Valley region of suburban Phoenix and includes the cities of El Mirage, Peoria, and Surprise, and also many retirement communities such as Sun City. Republican Trent Franks who had represented the district since 2003 resigned from Congress on December 8, 2017, after a controversy regarding surrogate mothers. Republican Debbie Lesko won the special election that took place on April 24, 2018, defeating Democratic nominee Hiral Tipirneni with 53% of the vote. The district had a PVI of R+13.

=== Republican primary ===
==== Candidates ====
===== Nominee =====
- Debbie Lesko, incumbent U.S. Representative

===== Eliminated in primary =====
- Sandra E. Dowling, former Maricopa County School Superintendent

===== Declined =====
- Chad Allen, health care executive
- Travis Angry, activist
- Scott Allen Baker
- Jan Brewer, former Governor of Arizona (endorsed Lesko)
- Cathy Carlat, Mayor of Peoria, Arizona
- Kevin Engholdt, consultant
- Trent Franks, former U.S. Representative
- Clint Hickman, Maricopa County Supervisor
- David Lien, teacher
- Georgia Lord, former mayor of Goodyear, Arizona
- Phil Lovas, former state representative
- Steve Montenegro, state senator
- Jon Ritzheimer, activist
- Steven Sawdy (write-in)
- Bob Stump, former Arizona Corporation Commissioner
- Christopher Sylvester, navy veteran
- Kimberly Yee, state senator

==== Primary results ====
Republican primary results
Party	Candidate	Votes	%
Republican	Debbie Lesko (incumbent)	73,776	77.2
Republican	Sandra E. Dowling	21,825	22.8
Total votes		95,601	100.0

=== Democratic primary ===
==== Candidates ====
===== Nominee =====
- Hiral Tipirneni, physician and nominee for this seat in 2018 (special)

===== Removed from the ballot =====
- Bob Musselwhite
- Robert Olsen

===== Declined =====
- Robert Kyle Schuster
- Brianna Westbrook, political activist and LGBTQ community leader (running for Arizona state senate)

==== Endorsements ====
Hiral Tipirneni

Labor unions

- International Brotherhood of Teamsters

==== Primary results ====
Democratic primary results
Party	Candidate	Votes	%
Democratic	Hiral Tipirneni	52,215	100.0
Total votes		52,215	100.0

=== Independent candidates ===
==== Not on the ballot ====
- Augie Beyer

=== General election ===
==== Campaign ====
The Lesko campaign was criticized for producing yard sign attacking Tipirneni as a "fake doctor" and as a "phony." on TV ads. These signs were taken down, but after Lesko accused Tipirneni of professional dishonesty during a TV appearance, the Arizona Medical Association withdrew its endorsement of Lesko.

==== Endorsements ====
Debbie Lesko (R)

Organizations

- ~~Arizona Medical Association~~
- House Freedom Caucus
- Maggie's List
- Susan B. Anthony List
Hiral Tipirneni (D)

Labor unions

- AFL-CIO
- Communications Workers of America
- International Brotherhood of Boilermakers
- International Brotherhood of Teamsters

Organizations

- Democratic Congressional Campaign Committee "Red to Blue" Program
- EMILY's List
- End Citizens United
- Indivisible
- MoveOn
- Stonewall Democrats of Arizona

==== Polling ====
Poll source	Date(s) administered	Sample size	Margin of error	Debbie Lesko (R)	Hiral Tipirneni (D)	Undecided
Lake Research Partners (D-Tipirneni)	September 24–26, 2018	400	± 4.9%	48%	44%	8%
Lake Research Partners (D-Tipirneni)	August 7–13, 2018	400	–	49%	40%	10%

==== Predictions ====
Source	Ranking	As of
The Cook Political Report	Likely R	November 5, 2018
Inside Elections	Likely R	November 5, 2018
Sabato's Crystal Ball	Likely R	November 5, 2018
RCP	Likely R	November 5, 2018
Daily Kos	Safe R	November 5, 2018
538	Likely R	November 7, 2018
CNN	Likely R	October 31, 2018
Politico	Likely R	September 21, 2018

==== Results ====
In the general election, Lesko won a full term, again defeating Tipirneni.

Arizona's 8th congressional district, 2018
Party	Candidate	Votes	%
Republican	Debbie Lesko (incumbent)	168,835	55.5
Democratic	Hiral Tipirneni	135,569	44.5
New Paradigm Party	Steven Hummel (write-in)	13	0.0
Majority		33,266	11.0
Total votes		304,417	100.0
Republican hold			

== District 9 ==
2018 Arizona's 9th congressional district election
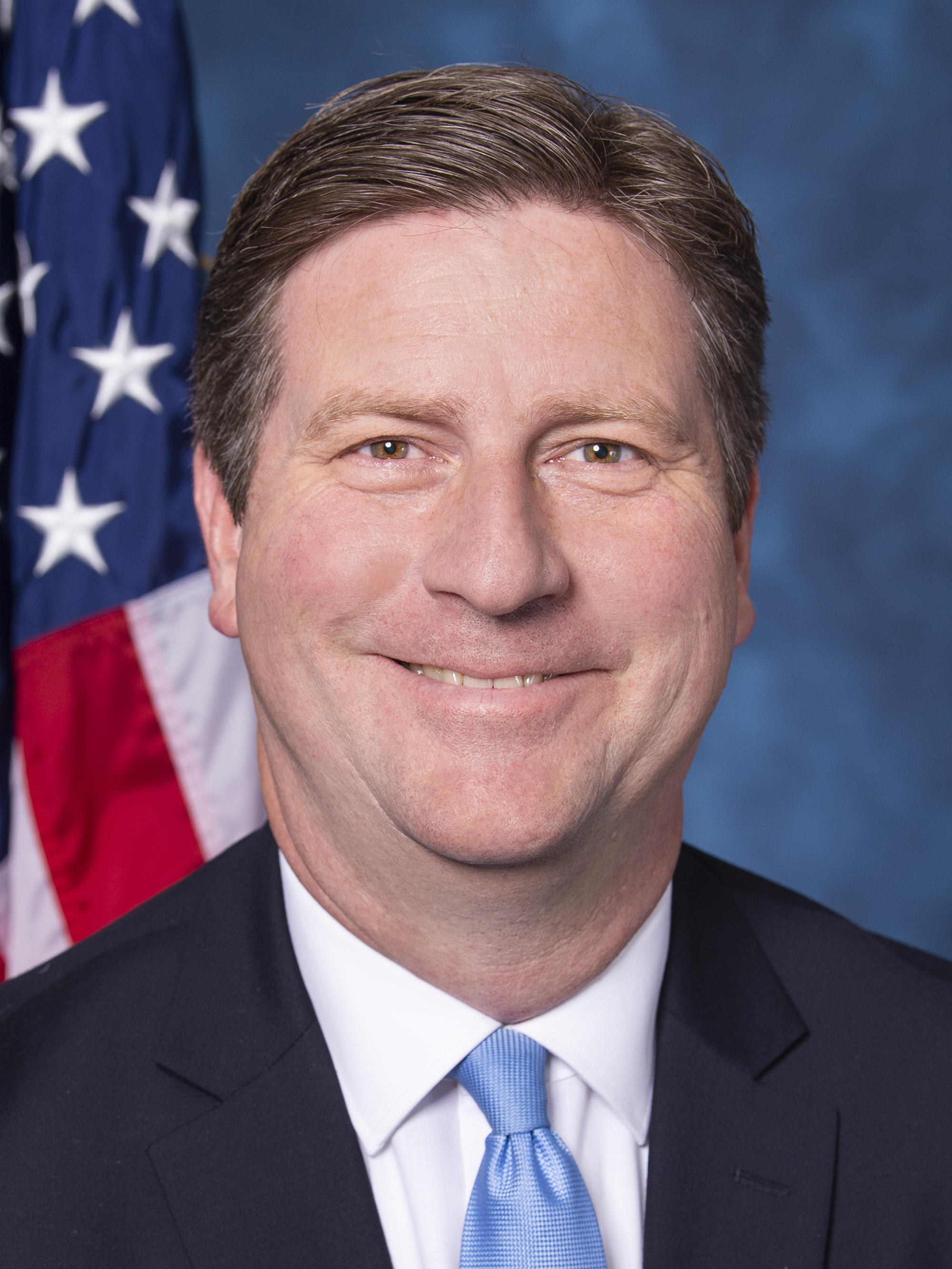

Nominee	Greg Stanton	Steve Ferrara
Party	Democratic	Republican
Popular vote	159,583	101,662
Percentage	61.1%	38.9%
- Precinct results Stanton: 50–60% 60–70% 70–80% 80–90% Ferrara: 50–60% No votes
U.S. Representative before election
Kyrsten Sinema
Democratic
Elected U.S. Representative
Greg Stanton
Democratic

The ninth district is based in suburban Phoenix and is centered around Tempe, and also includes portions of Chandler, Mesa, and Scottsdale. Incumbent Democrat Kyrsten Sinema, who had represented the district since 2013, did not seek re-election, instead running for U.S. Senate. She was re-elected with 61% of the vote in 2016, and the district had a PVI of D+4, making it moderately competitive.

=== Democratic primary ===
==== Candidates ====
===== Nominee =====
- Greg Stanton, Mayor of Phoenix

===== Not on the ballot =====
- Talia Fuentes, 2016 Democratic nominee for the 5th district

===== Declined =====
- Chad Campbell, former state house minority leader
- Andrei Cherny, former Arizona Democratic Party chair and candidate for this seat in 2012
- Katie Hobbs, state senate minority leader (ran for Secretary of State)
- Lauren Kuby, Tempe City Councilmember (endorsed Stanton)
- Juan Mendez, state senator
- Harry Mitchell, former U.S. Representative (endorsed Stanton)
- Mark Mitchell, Mayor of Tempe and son of former Rep Harry Mitchell (endorsed Stanton)
- Laura Pastor, Phoenix City Council member and daughter of former Rep Ed Pastor
- David Schapira, Tempe City Councilmember (ran for Superintendent of Public Instruction; endorsed Stanton)
- Andrew Sherwood, former state senator
- Tom Simplot, former Phoenix City Council member
- Kyrsten Sinema, incumbent U.S. Representative (ran for U.S. Senate)
- Corey Woods, former Tempe city councilmember (endorsed Stanton)

==== Endorsements ====
Greg Stanton

Labor unions

- International Brotherhood of Teamsters

Organizations

- Stonewall Democrats of Arizona

==== Primary results ====
Democratic primary results
Party	Candidate	Votes	%
Democratic	Greg Stanton	59,066	100.0
Total votes		59,066	100.0

=== Republican primary ===
This district was one of 36 Democratic-held House districts targeted by the National Republican Congressional Committee.

==== Candidates ====
===== Nominee =====
- Steve Ferrara, retired Navy Chief Medical Officer

===== Eliminated in primary =====
- Irina Baroness von Behr, pilot and Tempe City Council candidate in 2016
- Dave Giles, engineer, business consultant and nominee for this seat in 2016

Declined

- Sal Diciccio, Phoenix City Council member
- Hugh Hallman, former mayor of Tempe and candidate for state treasurer in 2014
- Dean Martin, former State Treasurer of Arizona

==== Endorsements ====
Steve Ferrara

Organizations

- National Republican Congressional Committee

==== Primary results ====
Republican primary results
Party	Candidate	Votes	%
Republican	Steve Ferrara	31,006	59.9
Republican	David Giles	16,722	32.3
Republican	Irina Baroness von Behr	4,020	7.8
Total votes		51,748	100.0

=== Libertarian primary ===
==== Candidates ====
===== Withdrawn =====
- Jenn Gray (write-in candidate)

=== General election ===
==== Endorsements ====
Greg Stanton (D)

Labor unions

- AFL-CIO
- Communications Workers of America
- International Brotherhood of Boilermakers
- International Brotherhood of Teamsters

Organizations

- End Citizens United
- New Democrat Coalition
- Stonewall Democrats of Arizona
Steve Ferrara (R)

Organizations

- National Republican Congressional Committee "Young Guns" Program
- With Honor Fund

==== Predictions ====
Source	Ranking	As of
The Cook Political Report	Safe D	November 5, 2018
Inside Elections	Safe D	November 5, 2018
Sabato's Crystal Ball	Safe D	November 5, 2018
RCP	Likely D	November 5, 2018
Daily Kos	Safe D	November 5, 2018
538	Safe D	November 7, 2018
CNN	Likely D	October 31, 2018
Politico	Likely D	November 2, 2018

==== Debate ====
2018 Arizona's 9th congressional district debate
No.	Date	Host	Moderator	Link	Democratic	Republican
Key: P Participant A Absent N Not invited I Invited W Withdrawn						
Key: P Participant A Absent N Not invited I Invited W Withdrawn					Greg Stanton	Steve Ferrara
1	Oct. 2, 2018	Arizona PBS; Arizona State University; The Arizona Republic	Yvonne Sanchez; Ted Simons	YouTube	P	P

==== Results ====
Arizona's 9th congressional district, 2018
Party	Candidate	Votes	%
Democratic	Greg Stanton	159,583	61.1
Republican	Steve Ferrara	101,662	38.9
Majority		57,921	22.2
Total votes		261,245	100.0
Democratic hold			

== Notes ==
Official campaign websites
- District 1
  - Tom O'Halleran (D) for Congress Archived 2017-07-28 at the Wayback Machine
  - Wendy Rogers (R) for Congress
- District 2
  - Ann Kirkpatrick (D) for Congress
  - Lea Marquez Peterson (R) for Congress
- District 3
  - Raúl Grijalva (D) for Congress
  - Nick Pierson (R) for Congress
- District 4
  - David Brill (D) for Congress
  - Paul Gosar (R) for Congress Archived 2017-09-12 at the Wayback Machine
  - Haryaksha Gregor Knauer (G) for Congress
- District 5
  - Andy Biggs (R) for Congress
  - Joan Greene (D) for Congress
- District 6
  - Anita Malik (D) for Congress
  - David Schweikert (R) for Congress
- District 7
  - Ruben Gallego (D) for Congress
- District 8
  - Debbie Lesko (R) for Congress
  - Dr. Hiral Tipirneni (D) for Congress Archived 2018-01-25 at the Wayback Machine
- District 9
  - Steve Ferrara (R) for Congress
  - Greg Stanton (D) for Congress
