= The Post-American World =

Book by Fareed Zakaria

- Original 2008 printing of The Post-American World
- Author: Fareed Zakaria
- Language: English
- Subject: Current affairs, international relations, globalization
- Publisher: W. W. Norton & Company
- Publication date: May 2008 (original), May 2009 (updated version with a new preface), May 2011 (Updated and Expanded as Release 2.0)
- Publication place: United States
- Media type: Print (Hardcover & Paperback), Audiobook
- Pages: 292 pp. original, xxx+292 pp. (2009 paperback), xiii+314 pp. (2011 Release 2.0 hardcover)
- ISBN: 978-0-393-06235-9 2009 paperback = 9780393334807; Release 2.0 = 9780393081800
- OCLC: 181139415
- Dewey Decimal: 303.49 22
- LC Class: CB161 .Z34 2008 or CB161 .Z34 2009 or CB161 .Z34 2011

The Post-American World is a non-fiction book by American journalist Fareed Zakaria. It was published in hardcover and audiobook formats in early May 2008 and became available in paperback in early May 2009; the Updated and Expanded Release 2.0 followed in 2011. In the book, Zakaria argues that, thanks to the actions of the United States in spreading liberal democracy across the world, other countries are now competing with the US in terms of economic, industrial, and cultural power. While the US continues to dominate in terms of political-military power, other countries such as China and India are becoming global players in many fields.

The book peaked at #2 on The New York Times non-fiction hardcover best-seller list and at #47 on the USA Today Top 150 Best-Selling Books list. Reviewers commented that Zakaria's writing was intelligent and sharp, yet accessible to general audiences. A few reviewers also wrote that the book was similar to an extended essay with journalistic style writing.

== Background ==
At the time of publication author Fareed Zakaria was a 48-year-old married man living in New York City and working as an editor for Newsweek International. Zakaria had immigrated to the United States from India during his university career. He graduated from Harvard University with a Ph.D. in political science in 1993 after earning a B.A. from Yale University. He worked as the managing editor of Foreign Affairs magazine before accepting the editor position at Newsweek. Labeled a liberal hawk, Zakaria's political views have shifted from supporting Reagan's pro-democracy agenda to Clinton's pro-market stances and to the point where Zakaria felt that the US was "unstoppable". In subsequent years, he watched as other countries set records for the world's tallest building, largest factory, largest refinery, and richest person. Meanwhile, he watched the US get bogged down in war in Iraq. In 2003, his book The Future of Freedom: Illiberal Democracy at Home and Abroad, in which he examines the necessary conditions for liberal democracy to survive, was published. While he initially supported US intervention in Iraq, Zakaria criticized the Bush Administration's methods of nation-building and for trying to force Iraq into a liberal democracy without the preconditions of economic liberalisation and rule-of-law. Over the next few years, Zakaria developed his theory on shifting global power as he contributed or wrote articles profiling emerging national powers and participating in economic forums and organizations.

== Synopsis ==
The content is divided into seven chapters. The first chapter introduces the thesis of the book: that a 'post-American' world order is emerging in which the United States will continue to be the most powerful nation but its relative power will be diminished. He believes that there have been three power shifts in the last 500 years: a shift of power to the West during the Renaissance, a shift of power to the US making it a superpower, and now a shift to several surging countries, especially China and India, and to non-governmental organizations. Zakaria believes that international organizations are not adapting well to emerging challenges and that there is too much focus on problems arising from potential market failures or general crises (e.g. terrorism) at the expense of focus on problems stemming from success (e.g. development causing environmental degradation, or rising demand creating high commodity prices).

The world is moving from anger to indifference, from anti-Americanism to post-Americanism. The fact that new powers are more strongly asserting their interests is the reality of the post-American world. It also raises the political conundrum of how to achieve international objectives in a world of many actors, state and nonstate.

— Fareed Zakaria, The Post-American World, pages 36–37.

The second and third chapters examine factors that led to the current power balance. Power shifted to the West because it fostered trade with foreign peoples and developed superior labor productivity per capita. Power shifted to the US because of its strong democracy and capitalist market. Zakaria argues that the success of the US in promoting free market capitalism and globalization has led to power being dispersed to several other countries. Economies have been surging for decades, in part due to large new players entering the global market place. He compares this era's economic growth to the economic surges of the 1890s and the 1950s which also saw new players become global powers. At the same time, Zakaria sees attitudes in the US becoming insular and distrustful of foreigners.

The fourth chapter focuses on China. Its strategy of small, gradual reforms has allowed it to quietly modernize. It has become the second most powerful nation, but still unlikely to match the US for decades to come. China's strengths include a philosophy that reflects Confucian ideals of practicality, ethics and rationalism. Its non-combative foreign policy is more appealing, most notably in Africa, over interventionist Western-style policy that demands reforms in other countries. China's weakness, though, is a fear of social unrest.

The fifth chapter focuses on India. Contrasted to China, India has a bottom-up democratic political system constantly subject to social unrest with only a few politicians losing elections. Its political system is characterized by strong regionalism — often placing high priority on regional interests rather than national. Zakaria lists India's advantages: independent courts that enforce contracts, private property rights, rule of law, an established private sector, and many business savvy English-speaking people.

The sixth chapter compares the American rise to superpower status and its use of power. He draws parallels between the British Empire in the 1890s and starting the Second Boer War, with the US in the 2000s and starting the Iraq War. The difference between them is that the British had unsurpassed political power but lost its economic dominance, whereas the US, in the 2000s, had huge economic power but faltering political influence. Zakaria defends the US from indicators that suggest American decline but warns that internal partisan politics, domestic ideological attack groups, special interest power, and a sensationalistic media are weakening the federal government's ability to adapt to new global realities.

The final chapter outlines how the US has used its power and provides six guidelines for the US to follow in the 'post-American world' envisioned by Zakaria.

Zakaria's guidelines for the US in the 'post-American world'
| | Guideline | Notes |
|---|---|---|
| 1 | Choose | Choose priorities rather than trying to have it all |
| 2 | Build broad rules, not narrow interests | Recommit to international institutions and mechanisms |
| 3 | Be Bismarck, not Britain | Maintain excellent relations with everyone, rather than offset and balance emerging powers |
| 4 | Order à la carte | Address problems through a variety of different structures (e.g. sometimes UN, sometimes NATO, sometimes OAS) |
| 5 | Think asymmetrically | Respond to problems (e.g. drug cartels, terrorists, etc.) proportionately and do not respond to bait (i.e. small attacks meant to draw attention) |
| 6 | Legitimacy is power | Legitimacy creates the means to set agendas, define crises, and mobilize support |

== Style and comparisons ==
The Post-American World, at 292 pages long, was described as "a book-length essay" and a "thin book that reads like one long, thoughtful essay". Written with an optimistic tone, it features little new research or reporting, but rather contains insights and identification of trends. The reviewer for The Wall Street Journal described the tone as "infectious (though not naive) sunniness...but without Panglossian simplicity". The American Spectator reviewer noted that the prose had a journalistic style while the reviewer for The Guardian noticed the writing sometimes displayed "news magazine mannerisms".

Zakaria's view on globalization was said to be similar to journalist and author Thomas Friedman. Friedman reviewed The Post-American World and called it "compelling". The review in American Conservative compared this book with Rudyard Kipling's poems "Recessional" and "The White Man's Burden", both written at the height of British power and warning against imperial hubris. The American Spectator review listed it as adding to similar themed books, comparing it to Oswald Spengler's The Decline of the West (1918), Arnold Toynbee's A Study of History, Paul Kennedy's The Rise and Fall of the Great Powers (1987), and Robert Kagan's The Return of History and the End of Dreams (2008). Kagan labeled The Post-American World as "declinist"; however, Martin Woollacott of The Guardian labeled Zakaria an exceptionalist. The Commentary review added the works of Samuel P. Huntington and Francis Fukuyama to the list of comparisons and suggested there is now a subgenre of books that consider the decline or demise of American hegemony.

== Publication and sales ==
The book was published by W. W. Norton & Company and the hardcover released in early May 2008. Excerpts were published in Newsweek, the National Post, and The New York Times. The book entered The New York Times' non-fiction best-seller list at #11 on May 18, 2008. It spent 13 weeks within the top thirteen spots, peaking at #2 on June 1. It spent 8 weeks on the USA Today Top 150 Best-Selling Books list, peaking at #47. An 8.5 hour audiobook, narrated by Zakaria, was released at the same time. A review in Publishers Weekly said that Zakaria's narration, with his light Indian accent and deliberate pacing, creates a sense of ease and allows for listeners to appreciate and understand the content. The paperback was released a year later late-April 2009. It spent several weeks on The New York Times non-fiction paperback best-seller list peaking at #11 on May 22, 2009. The book was short-listed for the 2009 Lionel Gelber Prize for best non-fiction book that seeks to deepen public debate on global issues. The book was published in United Kingdom by Penguin Press imprint Allen Lane and in Germany by Bertelsmann publisher Siedler.

== Reception ==
This is a relentlessly intelligent book that eschews simple-minded projections... Zakaria proceeds more subtly than the run-of-the-mill declinist by stressing American advantages not captured by growth rates and export surpluses. ... And maybe it takes a Bombay-born immigrant like Zakaria ... to remind this faltering giant of its unique and enduring strengths.

— Josef Joffe, New York Times Book Review

Various reviewers called the writing intelligent and sharp. The review in the Pittsburgh Post-Gazette called it a "succinct, short and comprehensible volume...full of sharp, almost aphoristic, amusing observations". John Ikenberry of Foreign Affairs saw Zakaria's characteristic elegance and insight reflected in the book. The reviewers in Policy and Economic Affairs identified Zakaria's strengths as being the breadth of evidence used to support the points and his use of personal accounts to summarize the research. The reviewer for USA Today Magazine wrote that "Zakaria analyzes problems brilliantly". The ability to communicate complex situations clearly in plain language made the book accessible to a wide range of readers. Several media outlets picked up the story of Barack Obama reading this book while campaigning for the 2008 presidential election.

Critics commented on Zakaria's teleological point-of-view. In a review published in The Progressive, Johann Hari called Zakaria's assertions Thatcherist referring to the belief that there is no alternative to globalization and free market capitalism. Hari cited examples where policies such as what Zakaria advocated led to disasters, like the 1999 collapse of Argentinian economy, and financial deregulation resulting in the 2008 financial crisis, which had begun just after the book was published. In the book, Zakaria maintains that economic dysfunctions are caused by, and can be solved through, specific government policies. When asked, in February 2009, about the 2008 financial crisis, Zakaria asserted that the financial practices that created the collapse were American practices, and that it contributed to the post-American mentality that the US does not have all of the answers. Hari also disagreed with Zakaria's view of the economic histories of Britain and America, which in Zakaria portrayal ignores extended periods of protectionism during which their industries were developed to the point where they were capable of competing with other countries. Likewise, academic and author Brendan Simms found that Zakaria too closely co-related national wealth with national power in his argument that dispersal of global prosperity will necessarily affect global balance of power.

The Economist review found a disconnection between the book's arguments and its sources in that the book addresses international and national (especially analysis of China and India), but nearly all the people behind the sources cited are based, or spent most of their careers, in the New York-Washington corridor. Richard Florida in The Globe and Mail and Michael Vlahos in The American Interest commented that Zakaria state-centric framework distorts the real base of power, which, for commentator Florida, is in cities like Shanghai and Hong Kong rather than all of China. Vlahos likened Zakaria to a courtier mirroring back the ruling narrative to meet the global elite's emotional needs. Regarding the book's focus, one reviewer criticized it by writing "The Post-American World is missing precisely what its title promises: a discussion of what a world might look like that is not dominated by the United States". Errors concerning characterization of Buddhism as Indian religion and Buddha's birthplace as India rather than Lumbini resulted in Nepali politicians demanding an apology from Zakaria or a printed correction.

== See also ==
- Post-American era
