= Ivy Naistadt =

American speaker and author

- Occupations: Speaker, author, executive speech coach
- Notable work: Speak Without Fear
- Website: ivynaistadt.com

Ivy Naistadt is an American speaker, author, and executive speech coach. She is most well known for her book Speak Without Fear – A Total System for Becoming a Natural, Confident Communicator, published by HarperCollins in 2004.

== Early life ==
Ivy Naistadt was born and raised in Syracuse, New York. She graduated from Ithaca College with a B.F.A. in Acting.

== Career ==
Upon moving to New York City, Naistadt worked as a page for NBC. She also worked as an actor. She later served on the faculty of New York University's Continuing Education Program. Naistadt has also been a spokesperson for such companies as AT&T, General Electric, Kodak, Westinghouse, Xerox, and as a producer of corporate business productions.

Naistadt's techniques were originally developed to combat the occasional anxiety she encountered during her acting career. Her introduction to public speaking began when she became a corporate spokeswoman for AT&T. She produced theatrical events for other corporations in which she coached business types on how to talk about their products.

Naistadt keen insight and deep understanding of speech have also been recognized in the NY Times, as she offers advice to George W. Bush along with Pat Buchanan, Robert St. John, Bill Maher, and Joseph E. Stiglitz. As a nationally recognized and sought after communication expert, Naistadt has also appeared on television, frequently conducts radio interviews, and has been quoted in numerous publications including: USA Today Magazine, Selling Power, Sales and Marketing Management, and The Daily News. She has also appeared on numerous radio stations including NPR.

Naistadt is currently listed in the Who's Who in Professional Speaking, and has been a current a member of the American Society for Training & Development (ASTD), the National Speakers Association, and the American Management Association.

Naistadt's book Speak Without Fear: A Total System for Becoming a Natural, Confident Communicator, published on HarperCollins in 2004, offers a unique, practical process for combating stage fright. Speak Without Fear has been translated to different languages, including Spanish, Russian, and Indonesian.

"This book could be your Bible as it addresses the problem of stage fright and other difficulties connected with public speaking." – USA Today Magazine.

Speak Without Fear has also been featured in various articles addressing fear of speech, including Stanford University's newsletter, The Journal of the Legal Writing Institute at New York Law School, The Daily Targum.
