= Fareed Zakaria =

American journalist and author (born 1964)

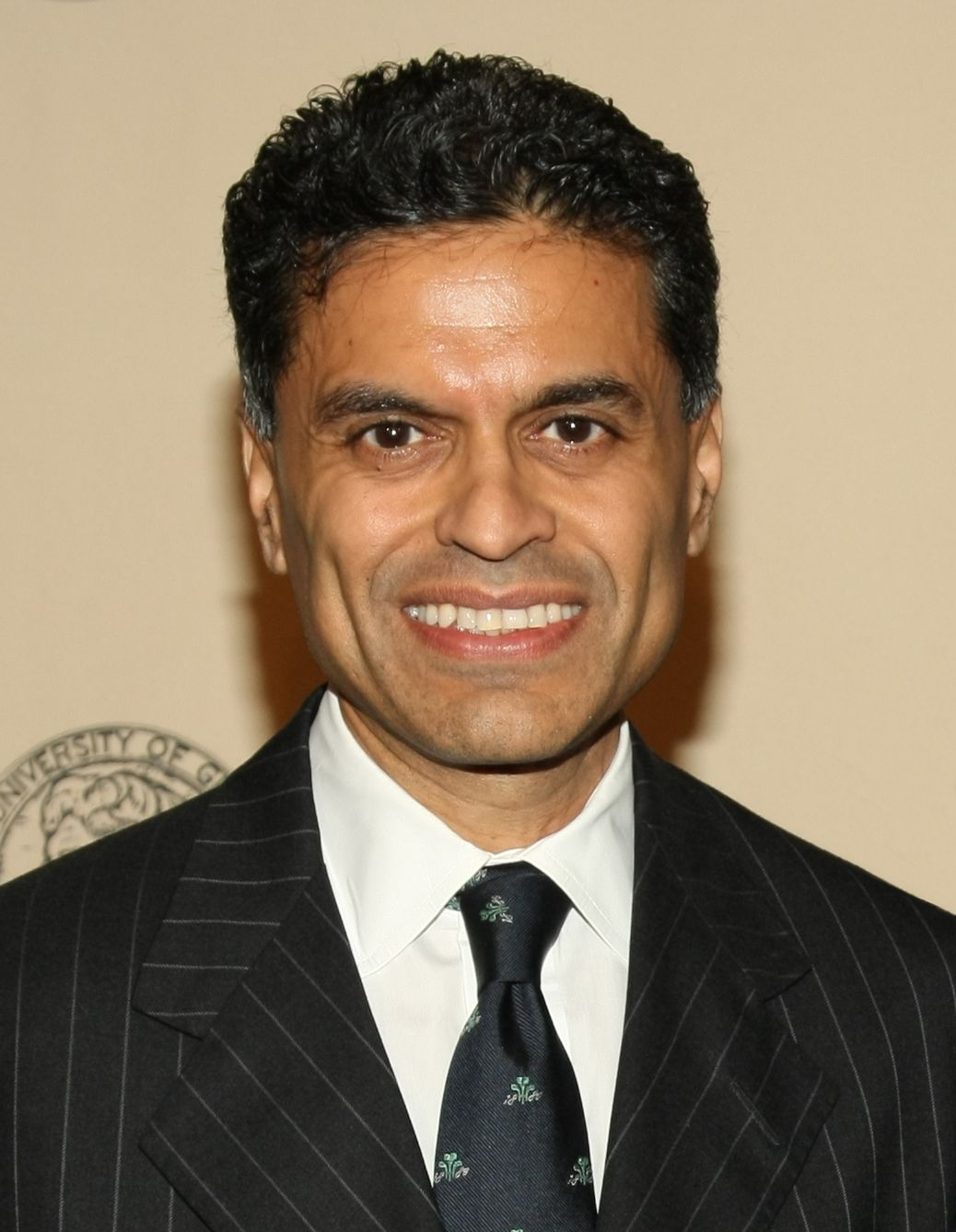
- Zakaria in 2012
- Born: Fareed Rafiq Zakaria; January 20, 1964 (age 62); Mumbai, Maharashtra, India
- Education: Yale University (BA); Harvard University (MA, PhD)
- Occupations: Journalist; writer; political commentator
- Employer: CNN
- Notable credits: Fareed Zakaria GPS, host (2008‍–‍present); Time, contributing editor (2010‍–‍2014); Newsweek International, editor (2000‍–‍2010); Foreign Exchange, host (2005‍–‍2007); Foreign Affairs, former managing editor
- Spouse: Paula Throckmorton (m. 1997; div. 2018)
- Children: 3
- Parents: Rafiq Zakaria (father); Fatima Zakaria (mother)
- Relatives: Arif Zakaria (cousin); Asif Zakaria (cousin)
- Awards: Padma Bhushan (2010)
- Website: Official website

Fareed Rafiq Zakaria (/fəˈriːd zəˈkɑːriə/; born January 20, 1964) is an Indian-born American journalist, political commentator, and author. He is the host of CNN's Fareed Zakaria GPS and writes a weekly column for The Washington Post. He has been a columnist for Newsweek, editor of Newsweek International, and an editor at large of Time.

== Early life and education ==
Zakaria was born in Mumbai, India, to a Konkani Muslim family. His father, Rafiq Zakaria (1920–2005), was a politician associated with the Indian National Congress and a scholar interested in Islam. His mother, Fatima Zakaria (1936–2021), his father's second wife, was for a time the editor of the Sunday Times of India. She died during the COVID-19 pandemic.

Zakaria attended the Cathedral and John Connon School in Mumbai. He graduated with a Bachelor of Arts from Yale University in 1986, where he was president of the Yale Political Union, editor in chief of the Yale Political Monthly, a member of the Scroll and Key society, and a member of the Party of the Right. During his time at Yale, he was also a prominent advocate against divestment from Apartheid South Africa. He later gained a PhD in government from Harvard University in 1993, where he worked with Robert Keohane.

== Career ==
After directing a research project on American foreign policy at Harvard, Zakaria became the managing editor of Foreign Affairs in 1992, at the age of 28. Under his guidance, the magazine was redesigned to be published once every two months, moving away from a quarterly schedule. He served as an adjunct professor at Columbia University, where he taught a seminar on international relations. In October 2000, he was named editor of Newsweek International, and became a weekly columnist for Newsweek. In August 2010, he moved to Time to serve as editor at-large and columnist.

He has published in The New York Times, The Wall Street Journal, The New Yorker, The New Republic. For a brief period, he was a wine columnist for the web magazine Slate, with the pseudonym of George Saintsbury, after the English writer.

Zakaria is the author of From Wealth to Power: The Unusual Origins of America's World Role (Princeton, 1998), The Future of Freedom (Norton, 2003), The Post-American World (2008), and In Defense of a Liberal Education (Norton, 2015). He co-edited The American Encounter: The United States and the Making of the Modern World (Basic Books) with James F. Hoge Jr.

Zakaria was a news analyst with ABC's This Week with George Stephanopoulos (2002–2007) where he was a member of the Sunday morning roundtable. He hosted the weekly TV news show, Foreign Exchange with Fareed Zakaria on PBS (2005–08). His weekly show, Fareed Zakaria GPS (Global Public Square), premiered on CNN in June 2008.

Zakaria, a member of the Berggruen Institute, is an interlocutor for the annual Berggruen Prize.

Zakaria was suspended for a week in August 2012 while Time and CNN investigated an allegation of plagiarism involving an August 20 column on gun control with similarities to a New Yorker article by Jill Lepore. In a statement Zakaria apologized, saying that he had made "a terrible mistake". Six days later, after a review of his research notes and years of prior commentary, Time and CNN reinstated Zakaria. Time described the incident as "isolated" and "unintentional"; and CNN "... found nothing that merited continuing the suspension ...".

The controversy was reignited in September 2014, when Esquire and The Week magazines reported on allegations made in pseudonymous blogs. Newsweek added a blanket warning to its archive of articles penned by Zakaria, and after an investigation of his several hundred columns for the magazine, found improper citation in seven. Similarly, after allegations surfaced on Twitter regarding the originality of one of Zakaria's columns for Slate, the online magazine appended a notice to the article indicating that, "This piece does not meet Slate's editorial standards, having failed to properly attribute quotations and information...". However, Slate Editor-in-Chief Jacob Weisberg, who had, months before, exchanged barbs with one of the aforementioned anonymous bloggers on Twitter in defense of Zakaria, maintained his original position that what Zakaria did was not plagiarism.

Corrections to selected Zakaria columns were also issued by The Washington Post, which had responded to the initial allegations by telling the Poynter media industry news site that it would investigate. Later on the same day, November 10, the Post said that it had found "problematic" sourcing in five Zakaria columns, "and will likely note the lack of attribution in archived editions of the articles." However, editors at The Washington Post and Newsweek denied that Zakaria's errors constituted plagiarism.

== Political views ==
=== Ideology ===
Zakaria self-identifies as a "centrist", though he has been described variously as a political liberal, a conservative, a moderate, or a radical centrist. George Stephanopoulos said of him in 2003, "He's so well versed in politics, and he can't be pigeonholed. I can't be sure whenever I turn to him where he's going to be coming from or what he's going to say." In February 2008, Zakaria wrote that "Conservatism grew powerful in the 1970s and 1980s because it proposed solutions appropriate to the problems of the age", adding that "a new world requires new thinking". He supported Barack Obama during the 2008 Democratic primary campaign and also for president. In January 2009, Forbes referred to Zakaria as one of the 25 most influential liberals in the American media. Zakaria has stated that he tries not to be devoted to any type of ideology, saying "I feel that's part of my job ... which is not to pick sides but to explain what I think is happening on the ground. I can't say, 'This is my team and I'm going to root for them no matter what they do.'"

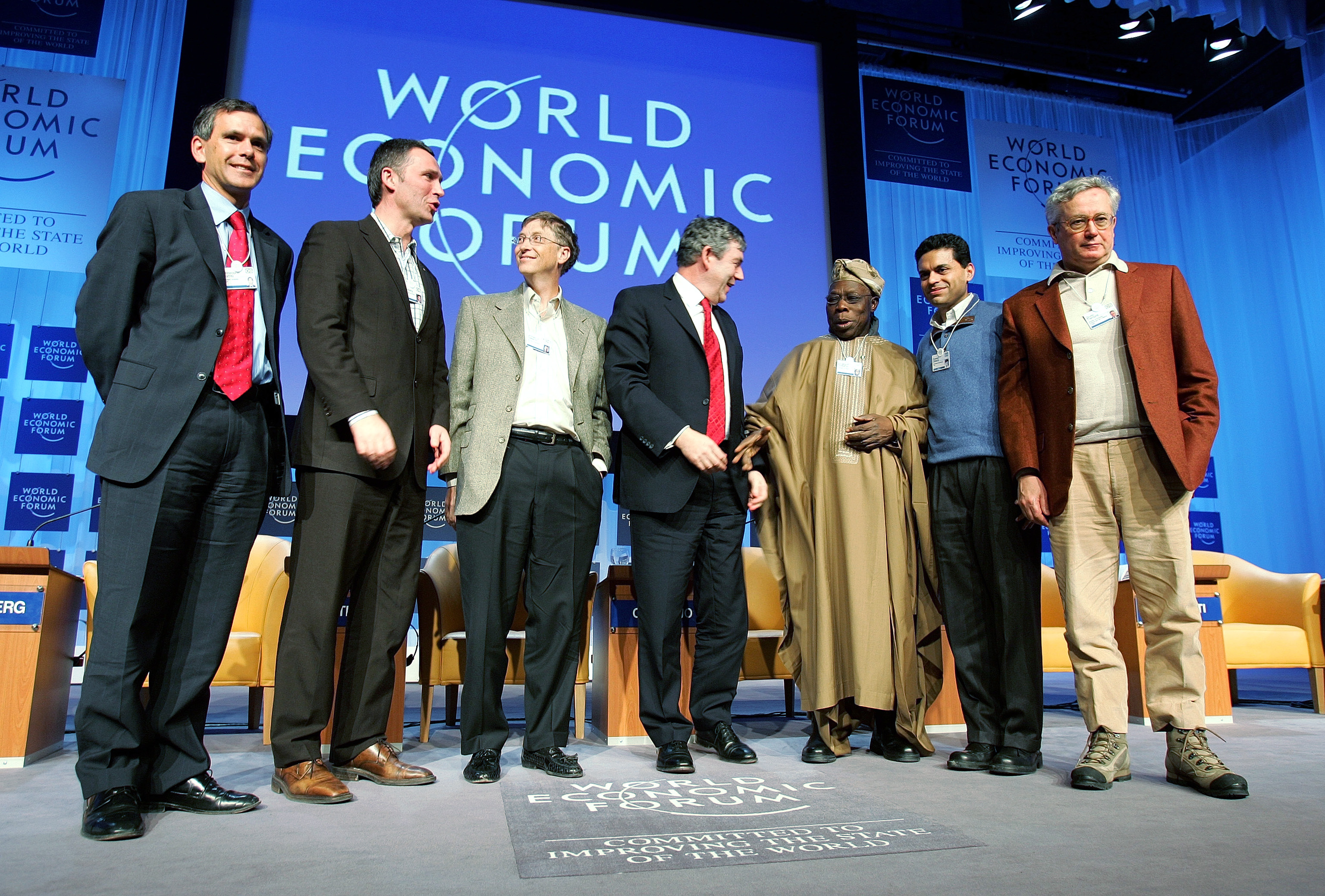
Fareed Zakaria at World Economic Forum 2006, Davos, Switzerland (second from the right)

Zakaria "may have more intellectual range and insights than any other public thinker in the West", wrote David Shribman in The Boston Globe. In 2003, former Secretary of State Henry Kissinger told New York Magazine that Zakaria "has a first-class mind and likes to say things that run against conventional wisdom." However, in 2011, the editors of The New Republic included him in a list of "over-rated thinkers" and commented, "There's something suspicious about a thinker always so perfectly in tune with the moment."

=== Democracy and the United States ===
Zakaria's books include The Future of Freedom and The Post-American World. The Future of Freedom argues that what is defined as democracy in the Western world is actually "liberal democracy", a combination of constitutional liberalism and participatory politics. Zakaria points out that protection of liberty and the rule of law actually preceded popular elections by centuries in Western Europe, and that when countries only adopt elections without the protection of liberty, they create "illiberal democracy". The Post-American World, published just before the 2008 financial crisis, argued that the most important trend of modern times is the "rise of the rest", the economic emergence of China, India, Brazil, and other countries.

From 2006, Zakaria has also criticized what he views as "fear-based" American policies employed not only in combating terrorism, but also in enforcing immigration and drug smuggling laws, and has argued in favor of decriminalization of drugs and citizenship for presently illegal immigrants to the United States of all backgrounds.

Before the 2008 U.S. presidential election, Zakaria endorsed Barack Obama on his CNN program. In May 2011 The New York Times reported that Obama has "sounded out prominent journalists like Fareed Zakaria ... and Thomas L. Friedman" concerning Middle East issues.

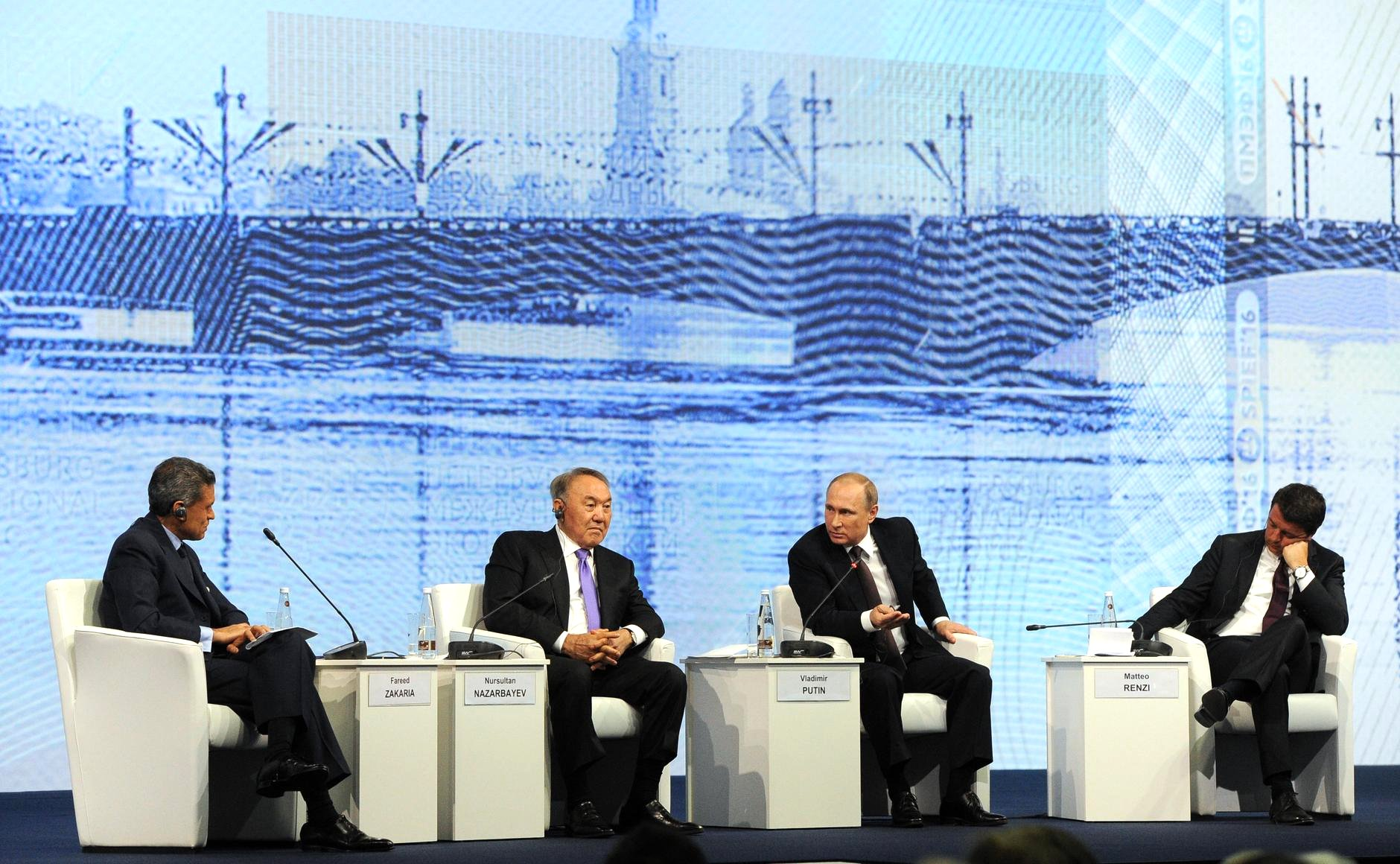
Fareed Zakaria and Vladimir Putin at St. Petersburg International Economic Forum, June 17, 2016

=== Asian politics and US involvement ===
After the 9/11 terrorist attacks, in a Newsweek cover essay, "The Politics of Rage: Why Do They Hate Us?", Zakaria argued that Islamic extremism was not fundamentally rooted in Islam, nor could it be claimed a reaction to American foreign policy. He located the problem in the political-social-economic stagnation of Arab societies, which then bred an extreme, religious opposition. He portrayed Osama bin Laden as one in a long line of extremists who used religion to justify mass murder. Zakaria argued for an intergenerational effort to create more open and dynamic societies in Arab countries, and thereby helping Islam enter the modern world. He also hosted a 2016 CNN special titled "Why They Hate Us".

Zakaria initially supported the 2003 invasion of Iraq. He said at the time, "The place is so dysfunctional ... any stirring of the pot is good. America's involvement in the region is for the good." He argued for a United Nations–sanctioned operation with a much larger force—approximately 400,000 troops—than was actually employed by the administration of President George W. Bush. However, he soon became a critic. In addition to objecting to the war plan, he frequently criticized the way the Bush administration was running the occupation of Iraq. He argued against the disbanding of the army and bureaucracy yet supported the de-Baathification programs. He continued to argue that a functioning democracy in Iraq would be a powerful new model for Arab politics but suggested that an honest accounting would have to say that the costs of the invasion had been much higher than the benefits. He opposed the Iraq surge in March 2007, writing that it would work militarily but not politically, still leaving Iraq divided among its three communities. Instead, he advocated that Washington push hard for a political settlement between the Sunni Arabs, Shia Arabs, and Kurds, and begin a reduction in forces to only 60,000 troops. He later wrote that the surge "succeeded" militarily but that it did not produce a political compact and that Iraq remained divided along sectarian lines, undermining its unity, democracy, and legacy.

In his 2006 book State of Denial, journalist Bob Woodward of The Washington Post described a November 29, 2001, meeting of Middle East analysts, including Zakaria, that was convened at the request of the then Deputy Secretary of Defense Paul Wolfowitz. According to a story in The New York Times on Woodward's book, the Wolfowitz meeting ultimately produced a report for President George W. Bush that supported the subsequent invasion of Iraq. Zakaria, however, later told The New York Times that he had briefly attended what he thought was "a brainstorming session". He was not told that a report would be prepared for the President, and in fact, the report did not have his name on it. The Times issued a correction.

Referring to his views on Iran, Leon Wieseltier described Zakaria in 2010 as a "consummate spokesman for the shibboleths of the [Obama] White House and for the smooth new worldliness, the at-the-highest-levels impatience with democracy and human rights as central objectives of our foreign policy, that now characterize advanced liberal thinking about America's role in the world."

Zakaria supported the April 2017 U.S. missile strike against a Syrian government–controlled airbase. Zakaria praised President Donald Trump's strike and said it was the moment "[he] became president of the United States."

In March 2021, Zakaria criticized the size of the U.S. military budget, saying that "The United States’ F-35 fighter jet program, bedeviled by cost overruns and technical problems, will ultimately cost taxpayers $1.7 trillion. China will spend a comparable amount of money on its Belt and Road Initiative...Which is money better spent?".

=== Social issues in the United States ===
In July 2020, Zakaria was one of the 153 signers of the "Harper's Letter" (also known as "A Letter on Justice and Open Debate") that expressed concern that "the free exchange of information and ideas, the lifeblood of a liberal society, is daily becoming more constricted."

In July 2022, Zakaria wrote a Washington Post article titled "Forget pronouns. Democrats need to become the party of building things", in which he said "There is plenty of evidence that the Democratic Party has moved left, that it is out of sync with Americans on many of these cultural issues, and that it needs to correct course" and that "This is not a perception problem. It is a reality problem. Democrats need to once more become the party that gets stuff done, builds things and makes government work for people. That's a lot more important to most Americans than using the right pronouns".

== Honors and awards ==
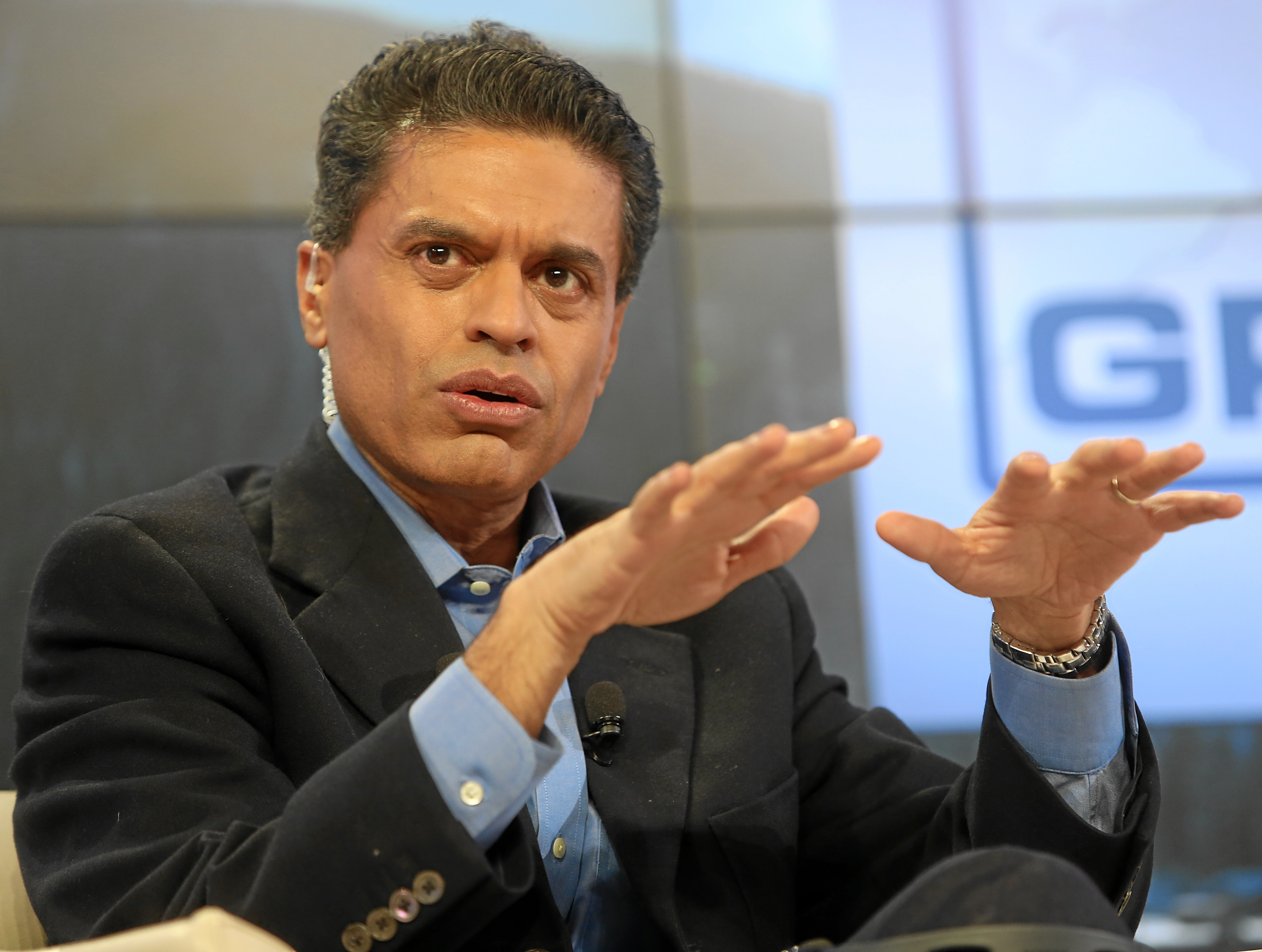
Fareed Zakaria in 2013

Zakaria won the National Magazine Award in 2010 for his columns and commentary. His show has won a Peabody Award and been nominated for several Emmys. He was conferred India Abroad Person of the Year 2008 award on March 20, 2009, in New York. Filmmaker Mira Nair, who won the award for year 2007, honored her successor. In January 2010, Zakaria was given the Padma Bhushan award by the Indian government for his contribution to the field of journalism. In 2019, Zakaria was listed as one of Foreign Policy's "Top 10 Global Thinker of the Last 10 Years". In 2020, Zakaria was awarded the International Center for Journalists (ICFJ) Founders Award for Excellence in Journalism.

He has received honorary degrees from Harvard University, Brown University, Duke University, Johns Hopkins University, the University of Miami, Oberlin College, Bates College, and the University of Oklahoma among others. He was the 2000 Annual Orator of the Philomathean Society of the University of Pennsylvania.

He has served on the boards of the Council on Foreign Relations, Columbia University's International House, City College of New York's Colin Powell School for Civic and Global Leadership. He was a trustee of Yale Corporation, the governing body of Yale University.

In 2010, in protest at the Anti-Defamation League's opposition to the building of the Park51 mosque and Islamic cultural center two blocks from the World Trade Center site, Zakaria returned the Hubert H. Humphrey First Amendment Freedoms Prize awarded to him by the ADL in 2005. He declared that the ADL's opposition to the mosque meant that he could not "in good conscience keep [the award] anymore". In support of his decision, he stated that the larger issue in the controversy is freedom of religion in the United States, even while acknowledging that he is not a religious person. He also wrote that a "moderate, mainstream version of Islam" is essential to winning the war on terror, and that moves like the ADL's make it harder for such a moderate version of Islam to emerge and thrive. On August 8, 2010, edition of Fareed Zakaria GPS, Zakaria addressed the issue, stating that in returning his award, he had hoped that the ADL would reconsider their stance.

== Personal life ==
Zakaria is a naturalized citizen of the United States. In 1997, Zakaria married Paula Throckmorton, a jewelry designer. The couple have three children. In July 2018, his wife filed for divorce.

He lives on the Upper West Side in New York City. While a graduate student, Zakaria pursued his love of cooking, a passion deepened by his interest in chefs like Jacques Pépin and Julia Child. Zakaria is a self-described nonpracticing Muslim. He added: "My views on faith are complicated—somewhere between deism and agnosticism. I am completely secular in my outlook." His ex-wife is a Christian, and his three children have not been raised as Muslims.

== Bibliography ==
- The American Encounter: The United States and the Making of the Modern World Essays from 75 Years of Foreign Affairs, edited by James F. Hoge and Fareed Zakaria, (Basic Books; 1997) ISBN 0-465-00170-X
- From Wealth to Power: The Unusual origins of America's World Role, Fareed Zakaria, (Princeton University Press; 1998) ISBN 0-691-04496-1
- The Future of Freedom: Illiberal Democracy at Home and Abroad, Fareed Zakaria, (W.W. Norton & Company; 2003) ISBN 0-393-04764-4
- The Post-American World, Fareed Zakaria, (W.W. Norton & Company; 2008) ISBN 0-393-06235-X
- The Post-American World, Release 2.0, Fareed Zakaria, (W.W. Norton & Company; 2011) ISBN 0-393-08180-X
- In Defense of a Liberal Education, Fareed Zakaria, (W.W. Norton & Company; 2015) ISBN 978-0-393-24768-8
- Ten Lessons for a Post-Pandemic World, Fareed Zakaria, (W.W. Norton & Company; 2020) ISBN 978-0-393-54213-4
- Age of Revolutions: Progress and Backlash from 1600 to the Present, Fareed Zakaria, (W. W. Norton & Company; 2024) ISBN 978-0-393-23923-2

== See also ==
- Indians in the New York City metropolitan region
- List of Yale University people
- List of Harvard University people
- New Yorkers in journalism
