= Josh Bernstein (talk show host) =

American talk show host

- Born: New Jersey, United States
- Occupations: TV Show Host, Professional Speaker, Conservative Commentator, Author

Josh Bernstein hosts the Josh Bernstein Uncensored Show, which is an American conservative talk show (according to its own website) airing daily. He is also known for his prior show on YouTube, The Josh Bernstein Show.

== Career ==
The Josh Bernstein Show began as an internet podcast in 2014. Since then, it has evolved into a live-recorded TV show with weekly guests. His original weekly program had been named in the Top Talk Radio's "Top 100 Conservative All Stars List".

Bernstein has contributed to The NutriMedical Report W/Dr. Bill, The Allan Nathan Show, and The Lars Larson Show.

As a commentator and analyst, Josh Bernstein has been featured by multiple publications including Forbes,The Atlantic One America News Network, Next News Network, PIJN News, and the USA Today In addition, Bernstein has also been a contributor to Breitbart News and Mediaequalizer.com.

As of October 2024, Josh Bernstein has added author to his career with the publication of Preserving Liberty: Bold and Brave Solutions to Save America and Create Permanent Freedom through multiple platforms.
