= The Future of Freedom =

2003 book by Fareed Zakaria

The Future of Freedom: Illiberal Democracy at Home and Abroad
- The Future of Freedom Book Cover
- Author: Fareed Zakaria
- Language: English
- Published: 2003
- Pages: 256
- ISBN: 978-0393047646

The Future of Freedom: Illiberal Democracy at Home and Abroad is a book by Fareed Zakaria that analyses the variables that allow a liberal democracy to flourish and the pros and cons of the global focus on democracy as the building block of a more stable society rather than liberty. It was a best-seller in the United States and several other countries. It is being translated into 20 languages at last count. The Future of Freedom is published by W. W. Norton & Company Inc. (2003 ISBN 0-393-04764-4), "with a new afterword", "bibliographical references", and "index" in 2004 (ISBN 0-393-04764-4).

Zakaria's thesis deals with the variables required for a stable and free democracy to be born. In the pursuit of this, his book begins with a historical overview of western democracy and its elements, arguing that not only can a liberal democracy form from a liberalizing autocracy (his most prominent example of this is South Korea), but that it is actually more likely to form and last that way than by trying to democratize the society first and liberalize it later (for this, he makes an example of Western Europe in the early twentieth century). He then goes on to describe illiberal democracies, defined as "regimes... that mix elections and authoritarianism," and argues that they are the result of countries that try to democratize without having a sturdy economy structured around the free-market and sound political institutions with checks and balances. This is then applied to America to argue that the increased democratization of American society and culture is what has caused the perceived failures of the government and governing elites.

== See also ==
- The Post-American World by Fareed Zakaria
