= Becky Nutt =

American politician

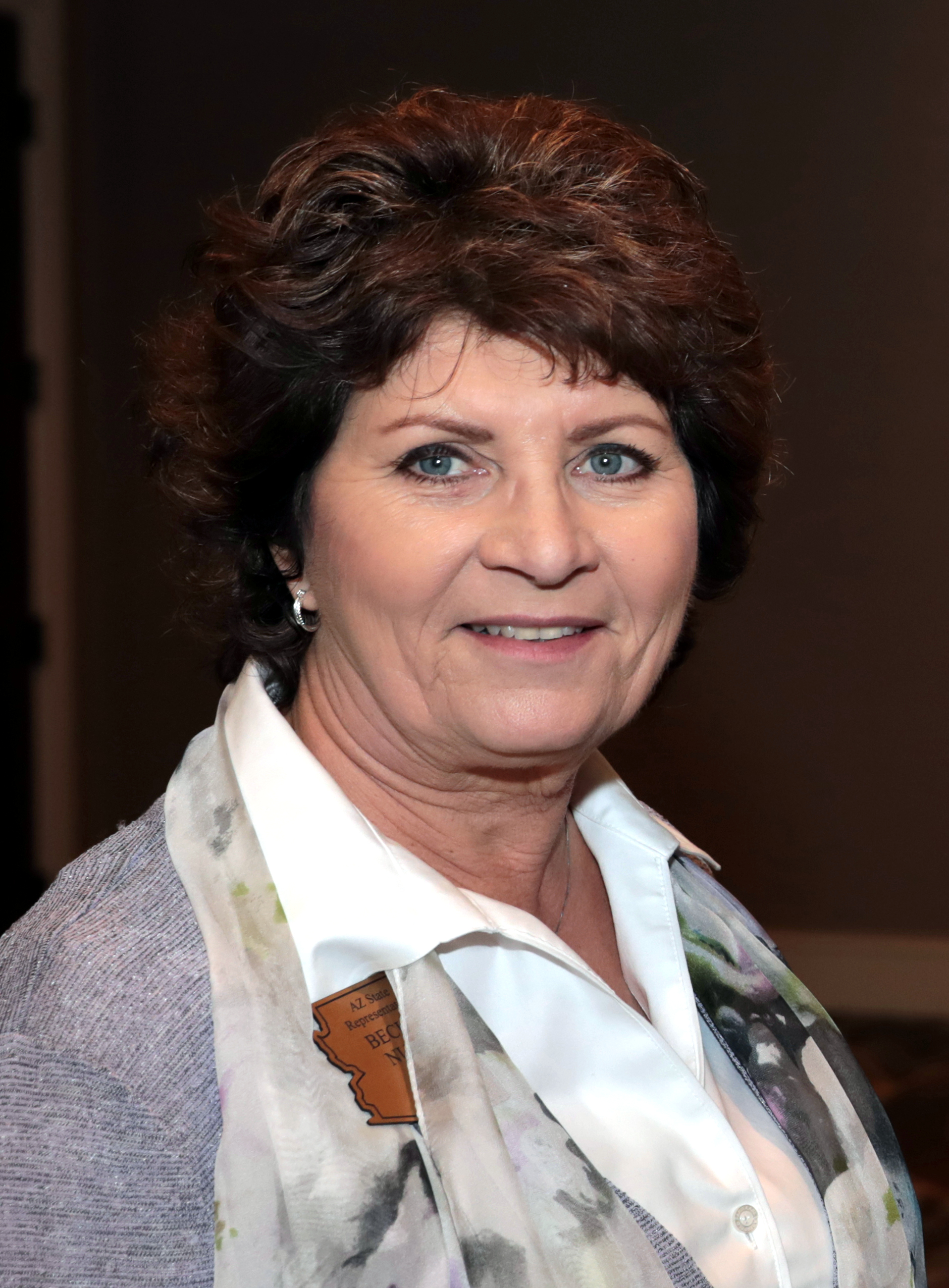
- Nutt in 2019

Member of the Arizona House of Representatives from the 14th district
- In office January 9, 2017 – October 29, 2021 Serving with Gail Griffin
- Preceded by: David Gowan
- Succeeded by: Lupe Diaz

Personal details
- Party: Republican
- Spouse: Rick Nutt

Becky Nutt is an American politician and a former Republican member of the Arizona House of Representatives, first elected to represent District 14 in 2016. She resigned from her seat on October 29, 2021.

== Education ==
Nutt received a bachelor's degree in public administration from Western New Mexico University.

== Elections ==
- 2016 Nutt and Drew John defeated Democrats Mike Holmes and Jason Lindstrom in the general election, with Nutt receiving 47,578 votes.
- 2016 Nutt and Drew John defeated Anthony Sizer and Dennis Barger in the Republican Primary.
- 2012 Nutt ran for the Greenlee County Board of Supervisors, losing to David Gomez.
