= Tom Simplot =

American politician (born 1961)

Thomas M. Simplot (born 30 January 1961) is an American politician who served as member of the Phoenix City Council in the state of Arizona. He was first elected to the Council in 2003 in a special election to replace outgoing council member Phil Gordon. He was re-elected to four-year terms on the City Council in 2005 and 2009. In January 2009, Simplot was unanimously voted by his fellow council members to serve as vice mayor. He represents District 4 on the Council, covering much of central Phoenix and extending into west Phoenix. Simplot is the first openly gay person to serve on the Phoenix City Council. He did not run for re-election in 2013.

In addition to his position on the Phoenix City Council, Simplot is President and CEO of the Arizona Multihousing Association (AMA), a trade association for Arizona’s apartment and rental housing industry. He is also an attorney and licensed realtor. He has worked in public service at the state and county levels as a senior advisor to former Arizona Governor Fife Symington and as chief of staff to former Maricopa County Supervisor Betsey Bayless.

Simplot is a longtime resident of Phoenix and a native of Ottumwa, Iowa. He earned his Bachelor of Science from Arizona State University and his Juris Doctor degree from the University of Iowa College of Law.
