= USA Today (magazine) =

American magazine (established 1978)

- Frequency: Monthly
- Publisher: Society for the Advancement of Education
- First issue: 1978
- Website: http://usatodaymag.com/
- ISSN: 0161-7389
- OCLC: 757302775

USA Today magazine is a periodical published since 1978 by the Society for the Advancement of Education. It is unrelated to the USA Today newspaper. The magazine is based in West Babylon, New York. Among the topics covered by the magazine are politics, ecology, education, business, media, literature, science, and religion.
