= Austin Smith (politician) =

American politician

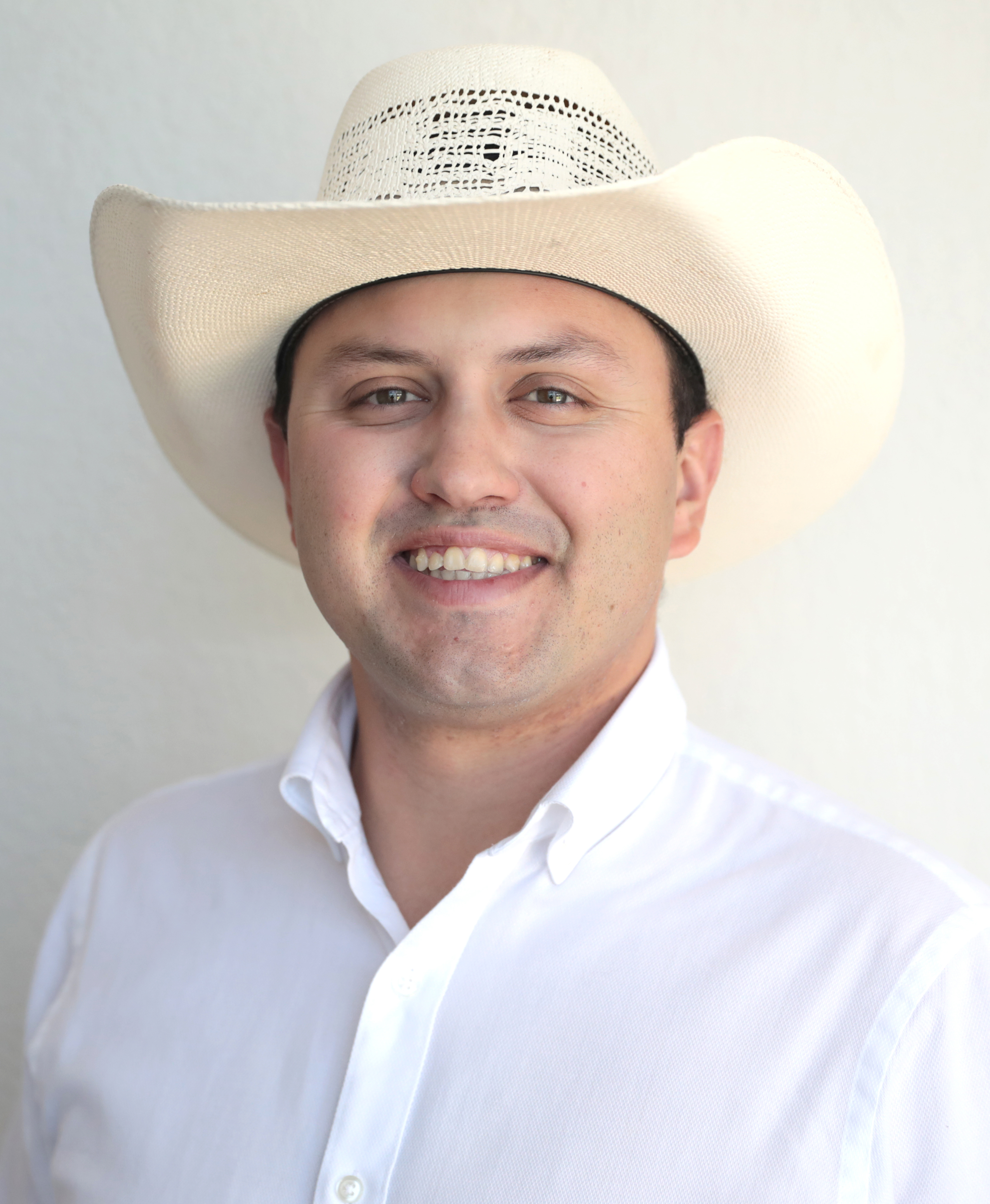
- Smith in 2022

Member of the Arizona House of Representatives from the 29th district
- In office January 9, 2023 – January 13, 2025
- Preceded by: Cesar Chavez
- Succeeded by: James Taylor

Personal details
- Born: April 20, 1995 (age 31) Glendale, Arizona, U.S.
- Party: Republican
- Education: Grand Canyon University
- Occupation: Non-profit director
- Committees: Vice chairman – Natural Resources, Energy and Water
- Website: AustinForArizona.com

Austin Smith (born April 20, 1995) is an American politician. He was a member of the 29th district of the Arizona House of Representatives, alongside Steve Montenegro, from 2023 to 2025. He was also a senior director of Turning Point Action. In November 2025, he pleaded guilty to forging signatures on his re-election petition. On January 6, 2026, Smith was sentenced to probation and a five-year ban from running for public office.

== Career ==
Smith was a conservative youth leader. He is a former director of Turning Point USA, the conservative youth organization co-founded by Charlie Kirk and Bill Montgomery, and he is the former chairman of the Arizona branch of the Young Republicans.

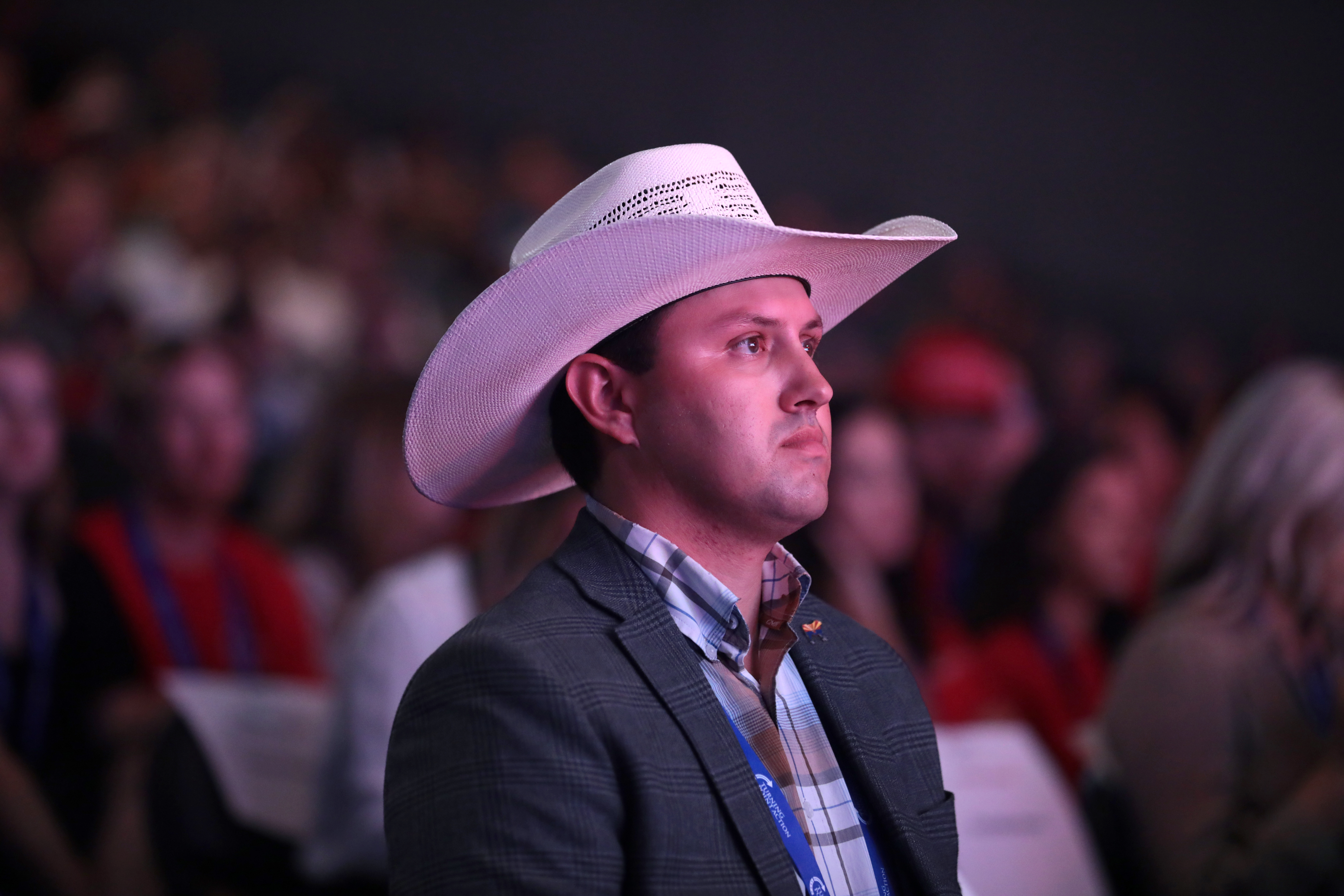
Smith at a "Unite & Win Rally" in August 2022

In January 2021, Smith was elected chairman of the Arizona Young Republicans Federation. He directed Turning Point Action – Charlie Kirk's 501(c)4 political wing of Turning Point USA. He was endorsed by Congressman Paul Gosar for the State House in January 2022. He received endorsements from the Arizona Free Enterprise Club, the Arizona State Troopers Association, Home Builders Association of Central Arizona, Center for Arizona Policy Action, Make Liberty Win, Republicans for National Renewal, the National Rifle Association and support from various agricultural groups in the beef, dairy and cotton industries.

== Arizona House of Representatives ==
In August 2022, Smith defeated Hop Nguyen and Trey Terry in the Republican primary election for the 29th district of the Arizona House of Representatives. In November 2022, he defeated Scott Podeyn along with Steve Montenegro in the general election. He assumed office in 2023.

In 2023, he introduced a bill that passed the Arizona House of Representatives and the Arizona Senate to ban ranked choice voting in the State of Arizona. The measure will appear on the statewide Arizona ballot in November 2024. He is a member of the far-right Arizona Freedom Caucus in the Arizona House of Representatives. In 2023 he was appointed to the Arizona Water Banking Authority by Speaker of the House Ben Toma. Smith is one of two youngest Republicans in history elected to the Arizona House of Representatives.

=== Voter signature forgery ===
Smith has long been an "election integrity warrior" and promoter of stolen election conspiracy theories, dismissing signature verification on Maricopa County ballots as "a joke". In April 2024 he withdrew his bid for reelection and resigned from Turning Point Action, three days after he was accused in a court filing of forging voter signatures on petitions he filed to qualify for the July Republican primary. Smith denied wrongdoing but said he could not afford the cost of litigating the matter. The allegations were referred to the Arizona attorney general's office for review, while Smith alleged Democrats had engineered the complaint.

In June 2025, Arizona Attorney General Kris Mayes announced that Smith had been indicted on 14 counts related to fraudulent candidate signatures on his nomination for the Republican primary in Arizona's 29th district. Smith was "charged with multiple felonies and misdemeanors, including deceiving the Secretary of State's office with petitions containing forged elector signatures and signing names other than his own to the nominating petition." He pled guilty in November 2025, admitting to having forged more than one hundred signatures. On January 6, 2026, he was sentenced to probation and a five-year ban on running for public office.
