= Austin Mardon =

Canadian author, community leader and advocate for mental health

Dr. Austin Albert Mardon
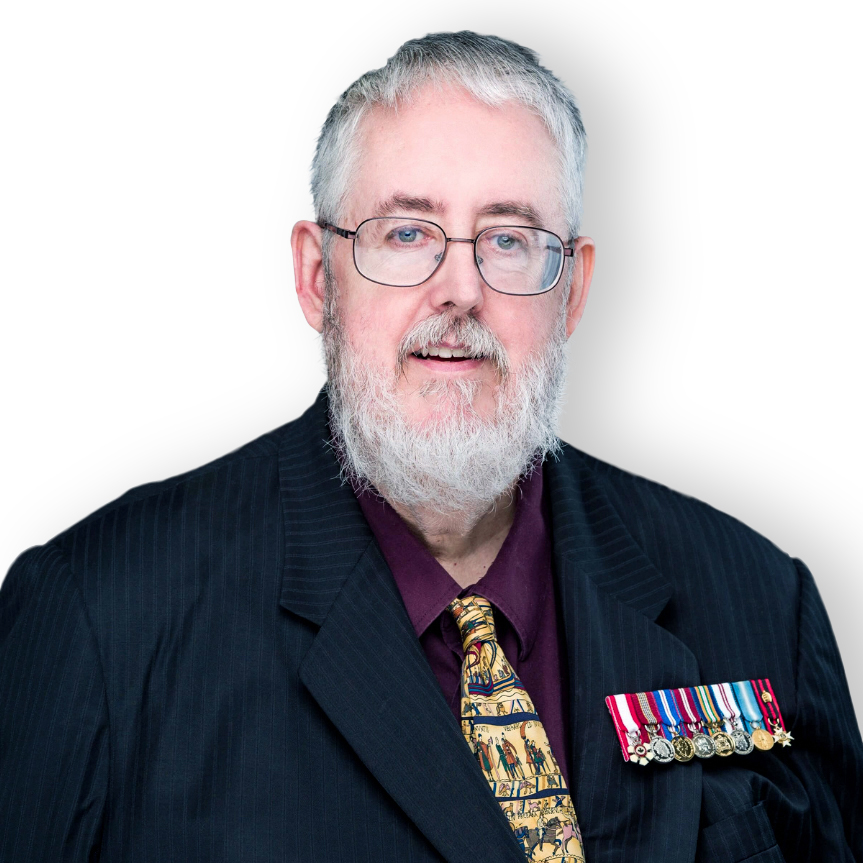
- Born: 25 June 1962 (age 64); Edmonton, Alberta, Canada
- Education: University of Lethbridge; South Dakota State University; Texas A&M University; Greenwich University
- Spouse: Catherine Mardon
- Scientific career
- Fields: Astronomy, Geography, and Medicine
- Website: www.austinmardon.org

Dr. Austin Albert Mardon, Ph.D. CM KCSS FRSC FRCGS is an associate adjunct professor at the University of Alberta's John Dossetor Health Ethics Centre and assistant adjunct professor at the University of Lethbridge, Department of Neuroscience. Mardon is married to lawyer and activist Catherine Mardon with whom he has co-authored several books.

As a Canadian author and researcher, Mardon regularly publishes research on geography and astronomy. Mardon also co-researches in other fields such as medicine and has co-authored a variety of introductory subject primers through the Golden Meteorite Press. Mardon has published over 360 scholarly papers and 200 non-fiction and fiction books. These publications have received over 87,000 views making Mardon one of Canada's most prolific academic scholars. According to Academia.edu, Mardon's view count places him amongst the top 0.1% of scholars.

As a mental health advocate, Mardon has served in many related volunteer and professional capacities. For instance, Mardon has served in both board and committee member roles for Alberta Health Services, the Schizophrenia Society of Alberta, and the Canadian Mental Health Association.

In 1985, Mardon founded the Antarctic Institute of Canada, a non-profit based in Edmonton, Alberta. Originally founded to lobby the federal government to increase Antarctic research, the Institute now supports academic writing, research, and multimedia on a variety of topics.

== Biography ==
=== Family history ===
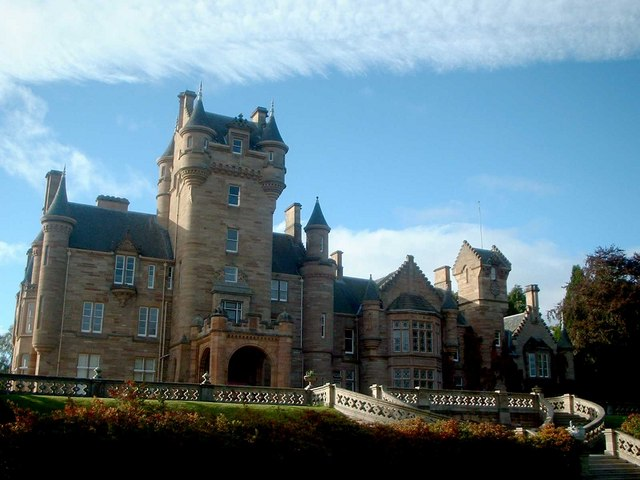
Ardross Castle. The fine balustraded terrace, fountain and other sculptural features were constructed by Pulham and Son.

Mardon's paternal grandfather, also named Austin Mardon, graduated from Cambridge University prior to becoming a professor in comparative classics and history. Mardon's father, Ernest George Mardon, attended Trinity College in Dublin before becoming an English professor at the University of Lethbridge.

In 1937, Mr. and Mrs. Mardon (Mardon's grandparents) purchased Ardross Castle, Lealty Farm, and 80 acres of land. A 19th Century castle built in the Scottish baronial style, the Ardross Castle property, at one point, encompassed 60,000 acres of the Scottish countryside. Mr. Austin Mardon and his wife lived at Ardross Castle until 1983, when the estate was eventually sold and acquired by the McTaggart family. Today, the Castle hosts private events and is used as a filming location.

=== Early years ===
Mardon was born June 25, 1962, in Edmonton, Alberta, to May and Ernest George Mardon. During his youth, Mardon resided in Lethbridge, Alberta, where he would often fall ill and be subject to bullying. During the winter months, Mardon would travel to Hawaii with his mother and sister. Locally, Mardon attended St. Patrick's Elementary School, St. Mary's Junior High School, and Catholic Central High School. Prior to University, Mardon also attended Invergordon Academy in Ross-shire, Scotland.

In his late teens, Mardon attended the Grenoble Alpes University, a public research university in Grenoble, France. After receiving a French Diploma in 1979, Mardon returned to Canada where he pursued a Bachelor of Arts in Cultural Geography at the University of Lethbridge. In 1985, after graduating, Mardon served with the Canadian Armed Forces as part of the Primary Reserve. From 1981 through 1985 Mardon completed basic training and was stationed at the Canadian Armed Forces base in Dundurn, Saskatchewan.

=== Education ===
Between 1979 and 1985, Mardon earned a Bachelor of Arts degree in Cultural Geography from the University of Lethbridge in Alberta, Canada. Following his undergraduate studies, Mardon pursued a Master of Science degree, from 1985 through 1988, in Geography at South Dakota State University. Subsequently, from 1986 to 1990, Mardon obtained a Master of Education degree in Education Curriculum and Instruction at Texas A&M University in College Station, Texas.

After obtaining his Master of Education degree, Mardon engaged in graduate coursework in Space Science at the University of North Dakota throughout 1990. Then, from 1993 through 2000, Mardon worked towards and received a Doctorate (Ph.D.) degree in Geography from Greenwich University on Norfolk Island, Australia.

From 2001 to 2005, Mardon continued his studies through graduate coursework in Theology at Newman Theological College in Edmonton, Alberta. Simultaneously, from 2002 to 2004, Mardon engaged in graduate coursework in both Geography at Kharkov National University in Kharkiv, Ukraine and Comparative Education at the University of South Africa.

=== Career ===
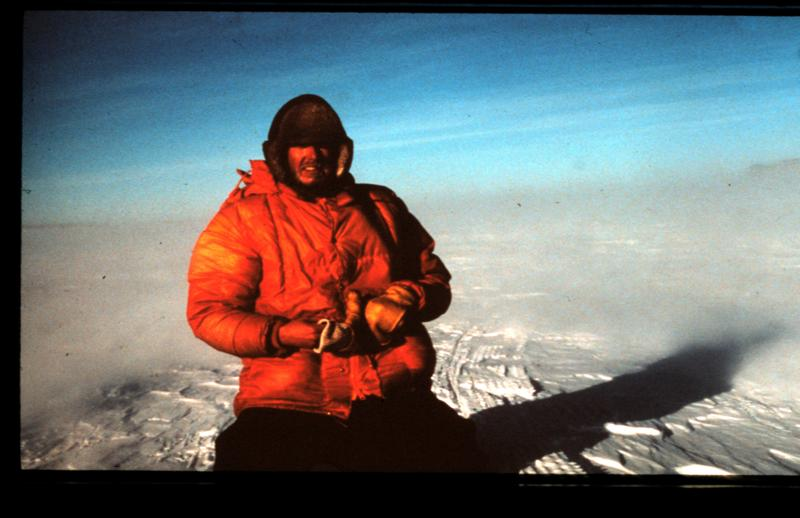
A photograph of Mardon from the back of a snowmobile, taken December, 1986.

While doing graduate work at South Dakota State University in 1986, Mardon was invited to be a member of the 1986–1987 Antarctic meteorite expedition for NASA and the National Science Foundation. 170 miles from the South Pole, Mardon and his team found hundreds of meteorites. During this expedition, Mardon suffered environmental exposure which damaged his lungs and gave him a permanent cough. He received the Antarctica Service Medal for his efforts.

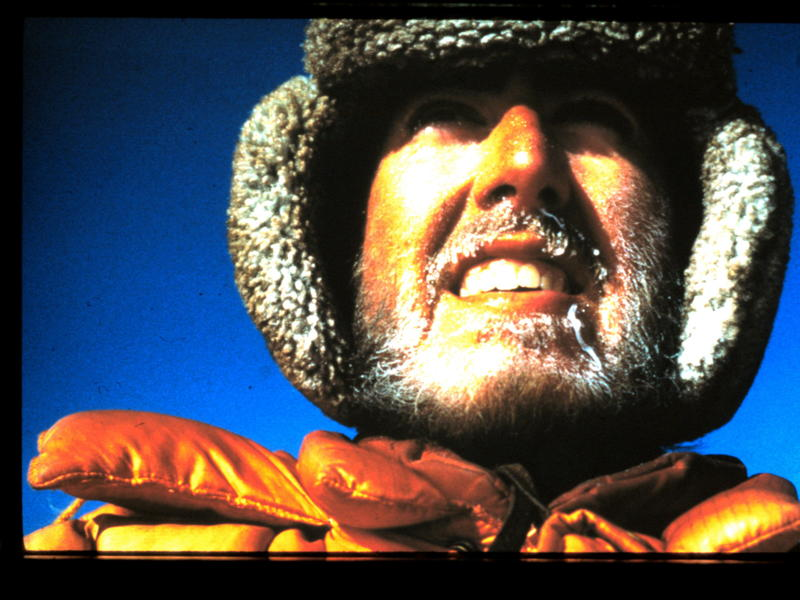
A headshot of Mardon taken at Beardmore Glacier in December, 1986.

On his return to Alberta, Mardon gave lectures on Antarctica at the University of Calgary and the University of Lethbridge. While he later secured an interview to be a member of the Canadian/Soviet Arctic traverse from northern Siberia to Ellesmere Island in the Canadian Arctic, he was not accepted for that expedition. He was also supposed to join an Argentinian Antarctic expedition in the late 1980s, but a fire at the Argentinian Antarctic base caused the expedition to be cancelled.

Eventually, Mardon went on another meteorite recovery expedition, this time in the Canadian Arctic near Resolute in the Northwest Territories. Although the mission did not yield results, Mardon wrote a paper on his conversations with locals and what the Inuit thought of meteorites.

One of Mardon's most significant contributions to astronomical science was a series of articles he wrote on the Anglo-Saxon Chronicle. The Chronicle is a running commentary on English medieval events. With the assistance of his father, a medieval scholar, Mardon discovered eleven cometary events, along with two meteor showers, mentioned in the Chronicle that are not mentioned anywhere else in astronomical literature. In 1991, Mardon was invited to join an expedition to the South Pole sponsored by the Geographical Society of the USSR. After travelling to Moscow to meet with expedition officials, Mardon quickly came to realize that he was under investigation by the Soviet government. Soon after Arriving in Moscow, Mardon was arrested first by the GRU, then by the KGB. After being held and questioned, Mardon was eventually released from custody but was to be accompanied by a "guide" at all times. Sometime later, Mardon secured passage back to Canada and eventually received an official letter of apology from Moscow.

In 1992, Mardon was diagnosed with schizophrenia. Following his diagnosis, Mardon began work as an activist for people with mental illnesses. Mardon has written multiple books on the subject of mental illness, and has been bestowed several honours and awards for his work as a mental health advocate. In 2006, Mardon was awarded the Order of Canada for his work as a mental health activist. In 2011, the Canadian Medical Association (CMA) awarded Mardon the CMA Medal of Honour in recognition of, "personal contributions to the advance of medical research and education." While awarding the medal to Mardon, CMA president Jeff Turnbull said, "Dr. Mardon has worked tirelessly to help Canadians better understand the issues around mental illness. In courageously talking openly about his own experiences, he is truly making a difference in coaxing mental illness out of the shadows in this country."

Over the years, Mardon and his wife have established several awards for College and University students. For instance, in 2012, at Newman Theological College, they established the Dr. Catherine & Austin Mardon CM Student Award Bursary and, at the University of Alberta, they endowed the Dr. Catherine & Dr. Austin Mardon CM Schizophrenia Award. Finally, in 2013, at Norquest College, they put into place the Dr. Catherine & Austin Mardon CM Schizophrenia Award.

Today, Mardon is an assistant adjunct professor in the Department of Neuroscience at the University of Lethbridge as well as an associate adjunct professor at the University of Alberta's John Dossetor Health Ethics Centre.

== Honours, appointments, awards, and degrees ==
=== Honours ===
Ribbon Bars of Austin Mardon

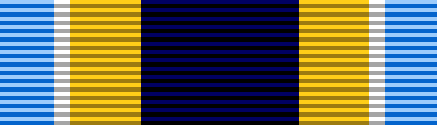

=== Appointments ===
- Order of Canada, Member- October 2006, Invested - October 2007
- Specially Elected Fellow, Royal Society of Canada - 2014.
- Honorary Social Worker, Alberta College of Social Workers - April 2015
- Holy See Order of St. Sylvester - 2017

=== Medals ===
- (United States) Antarctic Service Medal- US Congress (Navy) - 1987
- (United Kingdom) Duke of Edinburgh Award - Bronze Level - 1987
- (Canada) Governor Generals' Sovereign's Medal for Volunteers Award - 1996, presented 1999
- (Canada) Queen Elizabeth II Golden Jubilee Medal - 2002
- Alberta Centennial Medal - 2005
- Medal of Honour, Alberta Medical Association - October 2010
- Honorable Kentucky Colonel - Commonwealth of Kentucky April 2011
- (Canada) Queen Elizabeth II Diamond Jubilee Medal - 28 May 2012

=== Other awards ===
- Texas State Proclamation #51, Texas Legislature - 1988
- (Canada) Nadine Stirling Award, Canadian Mental Health Association - Alberta 1999
- Flag of Hope Award, Schizophrenia Society of Canada - 2001
- (Alberta) Distinguished Alumni Award from the University of Lethbridge - 2002
- (Canada) Presidents Award, Canadian Mental Health Association - Alberta - 2002
- (Canada) Ron LaJeunnesse Leadership Award, Canadian Mental Health Association - Edmonton 2005
- Bill Jefferies Family Award, Schizophrenia Society of Canada - 2007
- (Canada) C.M. Hincks Award, Canadian Mental Health Association - National Division - 2007
- (Canada) Best National Editorial, Canadian Church Press (Western Catholic Reporter article) - 2010
- (Canada) Mental Health Media Award, Canadian Mental Health Association - Alberta (for AHE Edmonton Journal articles) - October 2010
- (United States) Diversity and Inclusion Award, American Association of Geographers - USA - 2022
- Medical Humanitarian Award, Institute of International Peace Leaders - Pakistan - 2022
- (United States) Diversity, Equity, and Inclusivity Award, NASA - USA - April 2024

=== Degrees ===
Mardon has earned and received several degrees and honorary degrees from various universities. These include:

Jurisdiction	Date	School	Degree
Alberta	1985	University of Lethbridge	Bachelor of Arts (Cultural Geography)
South Dakota	1988	South Dakota State University	Masters of Science (Geography)
Texas	1990	Texas A&M University	Masters of Education (Curriculum and Instruction)
Australia	2000	Greenwich University	Doctorate, Ph.D. (Geography)
Alberta	10 June 2011	University of Alberta	Honorary Doctor of Laws, L.L.D.
Alberta	19 June 2014	University of Lethbridge	Honorary Doctor of Laws, L.L.D.
Alberta	2022	Norquest College	Honorary Diploma
Brazil	2023	Faculdade de Ciências Médicas e Jurídicas	Honorary Doctorate, HCA (Health Care Administration)
USA	2023	Logos University	Honorary Doctorate, HCA (Health Care Administration)
Alberta	2023	Athabasca University	Honorary Doctorate, DSc (Science)
British Columbia	2024	University of British Columbia	Honorary Doctor of Laws, L.L.D.
Nova Scotia	2024	University of Dalhousie	Honorary Doctorate, DSc (Science),

== Bibliography ==
Mardon has edited, authored and self-published over 200 books. He has published books on Canadian politics, history, mental health, science, geography, fiction and children's fiction as well as numerous scholarly articles and abstracts. Much of his work explores the topic of mental illness, with a specific focus on providing aid to disabled people. Some select examples of his work include:

=== Non-fiction: geographical thought and exploration ===
- A Conspectus of the Contribution of Herodotus to the Development of Geographical Thought (1990. Reprint in 2011)
- A Description of the Western Isles of Scotland (1990, Translator, with Ernest Mardon)
- Kensington Stone and Other Essays (1991)
- A Transient in Whirl (1991)
- English Medieval Cometry References Over a Thousand Years (2008, with Ernest Mardon and Cora Herrick)
- Space Rescue Systems in the Context of International Laws (2009)
- Community Place Names of Alberta (2010, with Ernest Mardon)
- The Taste of Frozen Tears: My Antarctic Walkabout - A Graphic Novel. 2020. Jessica Johns, Tyler Hein, Ed. E. Snyder, Austin Mardon, Catherine Mardon, Clare Dalton. Golden Meteorite Press (Edmonton, AB, Canada).a.
- Storms: A Detailed Analysis. 1st ed (2021) Johnson P.A., Asad U., Bakshi S., Chen A., Johnson J.C., Khan A., Lochhead J., Patel A., Sheikh N., Sui A., Steen J., Mardon A. Golden Meteorite Press, Canada. ISBN 9781773694825
- American and World Geography. 1st ed (2021) Johnson P.A., Bakshi S., Chen A., Johnson J.C., Gulaid R., Kennedy A., Khan A., Patel A., Sheikh N., Sui A., Mardon A.A., Steen J. Golden Meteorite Press, Canada. ISBN 9781773694306a.
- Ill Omens to Religious Idols: A Medieval English History of Comets. 2021. J. Au-Yeung, B. Gourlay, A. Krishna, K. Pandher, N.E. Trach, B.G. Fawcett, S.M. Gray, A.A. Mardon, K.E. Sheikh, R.T. Witiw, Z. R. Schauer, Introduction: Brett Fawcett. Golden Meteorite Press (Edmonton, AB, Canada).

=== Non-fiction: legal and political analysis ===
- The Alberta Judiciary Dictionary (1990, with Ernest Mardon)
- International Law and Space Rescue Systems (1991)
- The Men of the Dawn: Alberta Politicians from the North West Territories of the District of Alberta and Candidates for the First Alberta General Election (1991, With Ernest Mardon)
- Down and Out and on the Run in Moscow (1992, with Ernest Mardon)
- Alberta General Election Returns and Subsequent Byelections, 1882-1992, Documentary Heritage Society of Alberta (1993, with Ernest Mardon)
- Edmonton Political Biographical Dictionary, 1882-1990: A Work in Progress (1993, with Ernest Mardon)
- Biographical Dictionary of Alberta Politicians (1993, with Ernest Mardon)
- Alberta Executive Council, 1905-1990 (1994, co-author)
- 2004 Politicians (2009, with Ernest Mardon)
- Alberta Election Returns, 1887-1994 (2010, with Ernest Mardon)
- Alberta's Judicial Leadership (2011, with Ernest Mardon)
- The Mormon Contribution to Alberta Politics (2 ed.) (2011, with Ernest Mardon)
- Mapping Alberta's Political Leadership (2011, with Ernest Mardon and Joseph Harry Veres)
- Alberta's Political Pioneers (2011, with Ernest Mardon)
- Alberta Ethnic German Politicians (2011, with Ernest Mardon and Catherine Mardon)
- The Liberals in Power in Alberta 1905-1921 (2012, with Ernest Mardon)
- Who's Who in Federal Politics in Alberta (2012, with Ernest Mardon)
- History and Origin of Alberta Constituencies (2012, with Catherine Mardon)
- Alberta Catholic Politicians (2012, with Ernest Mardon)
- Lethbridge Politicians: Federal, Provincial & Civic (2 ed.) (2013, with Ernest Mardon)
- Alberta Anglican Politicians (2013, with Ernest Mardon)
- Political Networks in Alberta: 1905-1992 (2 ed.) (2014)
- Alberta Political Dictionary, (3 ed.) (2019, with Ernest Mardon).
- Alberta Political Dictionary, (4 ed.) (2021, with Ernest Mardon).

=== Non-fiction: science and social discourse ===
- Alone against the Revolution (1996, with M.F. Korn)
- Early Catholic Saints (1997, co-author)
- Later Christian Saints (1997, co-author)
- Childhood Memories and Legends of Christmas Past (1998, co-author)
- United Farmers of Alberta (1999, co-author)
- The Insanity Machine (2003, with Kenna McKinnon)
- Financial Stability for the Disabled (2012, with Shelley Qian and Kayle Paustian)
- Designed by Providence (2012, with Ernest Mardon and Claire MacMaster)
- What's in a Name? (2012, with Ernest Mardon)
- The Conflict Between the Individual & Society in the Plays of James Bridie (2012, with Ernest Mardon)
- Tea with the Mad Hatter (2012, with Erin Campbell)
- Curveballs (2012, with Catherine Mardon).
- Tackling Fetal Alcohol Spectrum Disorder. 2017. Shawna Gray, Asfar Khan, Heather Purves, Austin Mardon, Muhammad Ahmad. Golden Meteorite Press (Edmonton, AB, Canada). Golden Meteorite Press (Edmonton, AB, Canada).
- Our Stories. 2017. Austin Mardon, Jared Lane. Golden Meteorite Press (Edmonton, AB, Canada).
- Pandemic Theology. 2020. Jamela Camat, Jonathan Wiebe, Paul Dansereau, Lucas Tombrowski, Austin Mardon, Catherine Mardon. Golden Meteorite Press (Edmonton, AB, Canada).
- Tales to Tell my Daughters (as I Isolate During the COVID-19 Pandemic). 2020. Austin Mardon, T.R. Shand. Golden Meteorite Press (Edmonton, AB, Canada).
- Thriving with Schizophrenia (2018, with Gurpreet Gill, Navjeet Gill, Menaka Sivakumar, and Mithra Sivakumar).
- The Inheritance of Traits: From Genetics to Heredity. 2021. Austin Mardon, Natalie Wong, Michael Tang, Hanna Redda, Nataliya Raza, Hareem Balil, Vivek Kannan, Natalie Jean-Marie, Mical Habtemikael, Mackenzie Schuler, Mya Elisabeth George, Navneet Kang. Golden Meteorite Press (Edmonton, AB, Canada).
- Truth, Beauty & Goodness: Seshat Anthology. 2021. Darren B. Aspden, James Fisher, John Johnson, Peter Johnson, Andy Kim, Ananda Majumdar, Jilene Malbeuf, Austin Mardon, Catherine Mardon, A. T. Ness, Lucas Nowosiad, Isaac Oboh, Louis S. Park, Daniel Polo, Dollyann Santhosh, Gina Schopfer, Elisia Snyder, Riley Witiw, Gordon Zhou, Svetozar Zirnov. Golden Meteorite Press (Edmonton, AB, Canada).
- What in the World are Organ Transplants? 2021. Dr. Austin Mardon, Margaret Wa Yan Choi, Gurman Barara, Amy Li, Suad Alad, Christina McDonald, Julia Cara, Maryam Oloriegbe, Jasrita Singh, Tolu Atama, Sriraam Sivachandran, and Hafsa Alamagan. Golden Meteorite Press (Edmonton, AB, Canada).
- What in the World is Alzheimer's? 2021. Austin Mardon, Chen-Hui Yeh, Unaiza Asad Ullah, Elizabeth Li, Lajendon Jeyakumar, Bilal Ahmed, Steven Saleeb, Winston Hou, Saron Nigusie, Zeest Kadri, Zarish Jawad. Golden Meteorite Press (Edmonton, AB, Canada).
- What in the World is Angioplasty? 2021. Dr. Austin Mardon, Sabika Sami, Maha Saleem, Hafsa Saleem, Katie Tulloch, Madeline Langier, Lea Touliopoulos, Karanveer Kaushal, Kibrom Makaby, Khushi Shah, Madeleine Landell, Lydia Sochan, Laura Orsini. Golden Meteorite Press (Edmonton, AB, Canada).
- What in the World is Canine & Feline Psychology? 2021. Austin Mardon, Ishpreet Chana, Rokya Harun, Jaime Johnson, Jessica Jutras, Mehvish Masood, Ivan Quan, Ivy Quan, Sapna Rameshwarsingh, Jessie Wang, Jonathan Wiebe. Golden Meteorite Press (Edmonton, AB, Canada).
- What in the World is Diabetes? 2021. Austin Mardon, Aleefa Devji, Janani Rajendra, Susie Woo, Tara Y.T. Chen, Alicia Au, Sudipta Samadder, Ayah Nour Nehdi, Maria Gonzalez, Eline El-Awad Gonzalez, Megan Ng. Golden Meteorite Press (Edmonton, AB, Canada).
- What in the World is Paralysis? 2021. Austin Mardon, Zeest Kadri, Zarish Jawad, Elizabeth C. Li, Unaiza Asad Ullah, Lajendon Jeyakumar, Chen-Hui (Tiffany) Yeh, Wenteng Hou, Bilal Ahmed, Steven Saleeb. Golden Meteorite Press (Edmonton, AB, Canada).
- Traumatic Brain Injury. 2021. Austin Mardon, Ivy Truong, Kelsey Goddard, Marcy Costello, Bhargavi Venkat, Terrence Wu, Ananna Bhadra Arna, Ida Marchese, Yash Joshi, Cynthia Chu, Suhel Sadik Patel, Armita Yousefi, Dasarathy Mutharasan, Brett Boyd. Golden Meteorite Press (Edmonton, AB, Canada).
- Thermodynamics: An Explanation. 1st ed (2021) Johnson P.A., Asad U., Bakshi S., Chen A., Johnson J.C., Khan A., Lochhead J., Patel A., Sheikh N., Sui A., Steen J., Mardon A. Golden Meteorite Press, Canada. ISBN 9781773695297.
- Bipolar Disorder. 1st ed. (2021) Johnson P.A., Bakshi S., Chen A., Johnson J.C., Gulaid R., Kennedy A., Khan A., Mardon A.A., Patel A., Sheikh N., Sui A., Steen J. Golden Meteorite Press, Canada. ISBN 9781773694115.
- Seshat Anthology Volume 2. 2021. Austin Albert Mardon, Daivat Bhavsar, Katie Turner, Amy Zhao. Golden Meteorite Press (Edmonton, AB, Canada).
- Antibiotic Resistance: An Emerging Pandemic. 2021. Dr. Austin Mardon, Hafsa Alamagan, Christina MacDonald, Julia Cara, Jasrita Singh, Maryam Oloriegbe, Gurman Barara, Tolu Atama, Amy Li, Sriraam Sivachandran, Margaret Wa Yan Choi, Suad Alad. Golden Meteorite Press (Edmonton, AB, Canada).
- What in the World are X-Rays? 2021. Austin Mardon, Aleefa Devji, Janani Rajendra, Susie Woo, Tara Y.T. Chen, Alicia Au, Sudipta Samadder, Ayah Nour Nehdi, Maria Gonzalez, Eline El-Awad Gonzalez, Megan Ng. Golden Meteorite Press (Edmonton, AB, Canada).
- What in the World is Medical Isotope Production? 2021. Austin Mardon, Hadia Saleem, Grace Parish, Minahil Syed, Ezzah Inayat, Jessica Henry, Leah Heinen, Diana Eve Amiscaray, Faith Dong, Ellen Mak, Ipsa Gusain. Golden Meteorite Press (Edmonton, AB, Canada).
- What in the World are COVID Vaccines? 2021. Dr. Austin Mardon, Kelsey Goddard, Bhargavi Venkataraman, Ananna Arna, Ida Marchese, Terrence Wu, Cynthia Xu, Suhel Sadik Patel, Yash Joshi, Marcey Costello, Armita Yousefi, Dasarathy Mutharasan. Golden Meteorite Press (Edmonton, AB, Canada).
- e-Mental Health: Progress, Challenge, and Change. 2021. Austin Mardon, John Christy Johnson, Peter Anto Johnson, Shawna Harline, Robert McWeeny. Golden Meteorite Press (Edmonton, AB, Canada).
- Lice. 2021. Dr Austin Mardon, Hadia Saleem, Ezzah Inayat, Faith Dong, Diana Amiscaray, Ellen Mak, Jessica Henry, Minahil Syed, Leah Heinen, Ipsa Gusain, Grace Parish. Golden Meteorite Press (Edmonton, AB, Canada).
- Stem Cells: The Complete Blueprint. 2021. Dr. Austin Mardon, Sheher-Bano Ahmed, Samira Sunderji, Olivia Brodowski, Dhwani Bhadresa, Pareesa Ali, Si Cong (Sam) Zhang, Salma Abrahim, Rishi Thangarajah, Anusha Mappanasingam, Rodala Aranya, Joonsoo Sean Lyeo. Golden Meteorite Press (Edmonton, AB, Canada).

=== Children's books ===
- Many Christian Saints for Children (1997, coauthor)
- Early Saints and Other Saintly Stories for Children (2011, with May Mardon and Ernest Mardon)
- When Kitty Met the Ghost (2 ed.) (2012, with Ernest Mardon)
- The Girl Who Could Walk Through Walls (2012, with Ernest Mardon)
- Gandy and Parker Escape the Zoo: An Illustrated Adventure (2013, with Catherine Mardon)
- Grownup for a Week (2014, with Catherine Mardon, Aala Abdullahi and Agata Garbowska)
- Gandy and the Cadet (2015, with Catherine Mardon)
- Gandy and the Man in White (2016, with Catherine Mardon)
