= Kinderbeobachtungsstation =

Psychiatric facility in Austria, 1954–1987

- Kinderbeobachtungsstation Innsbruck
- Formation: 1954
- Dissolved: 1987
- Type: Psychiatric institution
- Purpose: Child observation and placement
- Headquarters: Sonnenstrasse 44, Innsbruck, Austria
- Director: Dr. Maria Nowak-Vogl
- Affiliations: University of Innsbruck

The Kinderbeobachtungsstation (German for "child-observation station"), also known as the Sonnenstrasse villa, was a psychiatric facility located on Sonnenstrasse in Innsbruck, Austria, operating from 1954 to 1987 under the direction of Dr. Maria Nowak-Vogl. Sponsored by the Tyrolean government, the institution was designed to evaluate and place children deemed "difficult" by the child-welfare system, often subjecting them to abusive practices under the guise of psychiatric care.

The facility, housed in a pale-yellow villa, confined approximately 3,600 children, primarily aged 7 to 15, for periods of up to several months. A 2013 expert commission report by the Medical University of Innsbruck exposed systematic abuse, including the administration of experimental drugs like epiphysan, leading to public apologies and financial compensation from the Austrian government.

== History ==
The Kinderbeobachtungsstation was established in 1954 under the leadership of Dr. Maria Nowak-Vogl, a psychologist and professor at the University of Innsbruck. The facility functioned as a diagnostic and placement center within Austria's child-welfare system, assessing children for behavioral issues and determining their subsequent placement in orphanages, reformatories, or foster care. Nowak-Vogl, influenced by the authoritarian principles of Heilpädagogik (curative pedagogy), implemented a regime characterized by strict surveillance, enforced silence, and punitive measures aimed at suppressing behaviors such as masturbation and bed-wetting.

The institution operated until 1987, with Nowak-Vogl overseeing its activities for over three decades. During this period, it became notorious for its harsh disciplinary methods, including the use of psychotropic drugs, sedatives like Rohypnol, and epiphysan, an extract from bovine pineal glands administered to curb perceived sexual behaviors. The facility's practices reflected postwar Austrian anxieties about social order, sexuality, and economic recovery, often targeting children from marginalized backgrounds, including those born out of wedlock or from single-parent households.

== Abusive practices ==
The Kinderbeobachtungsstation enforced a rigid set of rules designed to control every aspect of children's lives. According to a 2013 commission report and survivor testimonies, these included:

- Surveillance and punishment: Children were subjected to constant monitoring, with bed-wetting alarms and loudspeaker announcements enforcing silence and compliance. Punishments for infractions, such as bed-wetting, included ice-cold showers and prolonged isolation.
- Drug administration: Nowak-Vogl administered epiphysan to some children, particularly girls, to suppress sexual urges, despite limited evidence of its efficacy or safety. Other sedatives were used to manage "disciplinary difficulties," often without clear medical justification.
- Suppression of social bonds: Friendships and expressions of affection were discouraged, with socializing interpreted as sexualized behavior. Children were required to use abbreviated language during meals (e.g., "bitte, Löffel" for "please, spoon").
- Psychological control: Children were forced to recount dreams or assign identities to objects, exercises designed to probe their psyches but often resulting in punishment for non-compliance.

These practices were detailed in Horst Schreiber's 2010 book, In Namen der Ordnung ("In the Name of Order"), which drew on survivor interviews and prompted further investigation into the facility's operations.

== Legacy and reckoning ==
The Kinderbeobachtungsstation's practices remained largely unchallenged until the 1980s, when a 1980 Austrian TV documentary, Problemkinder, exposed some of its abuses. However, significant reform did not occur until after Nowak-Vogl's retirement in 1987. The facility closed that year, and the villa was later repurposed, briefly serving as a squat called Villa Kunterbunt in the early 2000s.

In 2013, an expert commission led by researchers from the Medical University of Innsbruck, including Elisabeth Dietrich-Daum and Ina Friedmann, issued a report condemning the institution's "systematic abuse." The report highlighted the unethical use of epiphysan and the facility's authoritarian environment, linking its practices to the legacy of Nazi-influenced psychiatry and Heilpädagogik. The Tyrolean government subsequently offered apologies and financial compensation to survivors, with 414 former patients coming forward by 2023 to report abuse.

The facility's history has been documented in scholarly works, such as the 2020 book Psychiatrisierte Kindheiten ("Psychiatrized Childhoods"), and through survivor advocacy.

== Cultural and historical context ==
The Kinderbeobachtungsstation operated during a period of postwar Austrian reconstruction, marked by cultural anxieties about sexuality, single motherhood, and juvenile delinquency. Nowak-Vogl's methods were shaped by her training in Heilpädagogik, a field with roots in Nazi eugenics and a focus on producing compliant, productive citizens. Her father, Alfred Vogl, served as a judge in a Nazi Sondergericht (special court), and her approach reflected a continuity of authoritarian ideologies in Austrian psychiatry, compounded by the country's incomplete de-Nazification process.

The facility's practices were not unique; similar child-observation stations operated across Austria, affecting thousands of children. The Innsbruck villa, however, was particularly notorious for its focus on suppressing sexuality, a preoccupation rooted in Nowak-Vogl's conservative Catholic beliefs and the broader cultural context of postwar Austria.

== See also ==
- Maria Nowak-Vogl
- Medical University of Innsbruck
- Child welfare
