= César Vidal Manzanares =

Spanish writer and historian (born 1958)

César Vidal
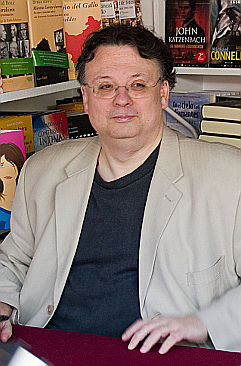
- Vidal in 2009
- Born: César Vidal Manzanares; 9 May 1958 (age 68); Madrid, Spain
- Education: Alfonso X El Sabio University, Logos University
- Occupations: Historian; author; political commentator; radio host
- Website: www.cesarvidal.com

César Vidal Manzanares (born 9 May 1958) is a Spanish historian, author, political commentator, and radio host.

== Early life and education ==
Vidal was born in Madrid on 9 May 1958, in Puente de Vallecas. He attended Escuelas Pías de San Antón for his secondary education. Born into a Catholic family, he became a Jehovah’s Witness at the age of fifteen before later converting to evangelical Christianity. His brother is jurist and writer Gustavo Vidal Manzanares.

== Career ==
Vidal holds a Ph.D. in Law from Alfonso X El Sabio University and degrees in theology and philosophy from Logos University.

He is a member of the Executive Council of the Interamerican Institute for Democracy. Since 2015, he has been a member of the North American Academy of the Spanish Language.

=== Radio ===
From 2004 to 2009, he hosted the radio show program La Linterna on Cadena COPE. In 2009, he left COPE to launch a radio station, esRadio, with Federico Jiménez Losantos, but abandoned the project in 2013 due to disagreements with a partner.^{[5]} Since 2014, he has hosted La Voz (The Voice), a radio program broadcasting from the United States.

=== Writing ===
He has written for several newspapers, including El Mundo, Diario 16, El Periódico de Aragón, and La Razón. He has published a series called Misterios de la Historia (Mysteries of History) in Libertad Digital.

Vidal has written over 100 books, several of which have been bestsellers and recipients of historical and literary awards. He specializes in historical studies on totalitarian regimes and the history of religions. His book Las Brigadas Internacionales (The International Brigades) has been described by American historian Stanley G. Payne as "the most complete book about the International Brigades published in any language." In Paracuellos-Katin: El Genocidio de la Izquierda (Paracuellos-Katin: The Genocide by the Left) and Checas de Madrid: Las cárceles republicanas al descubierto (Checas de Madrid: Republican Prisons Uncovered), Vidal estimated the number of people murdered during the by leftist groups .

== Political views and criticism ==
Historians such as Ian Gibson and Ángel Viñas have criticized Vidal for biased arguments and a lack of rigor, accusing him of misquoting historical sources and manipulating translations to support his opinions. For example, in his books about the Spanish Civil War (La Guerra que Ganó Franco, Checas de Madrid and Paracuellos-Katyn: El Genocidio de la Izquierda), he presents a revisionist views of the conflict that contrasts with mainstream historians but aligns with fellow conservatives like Pío Moa and Ricardo de la Cierva. He has also theorized that May 68 was "a CIA operation to destabilize general de Gaulle" ("una operación de la CIA para desestabilizar al general De Gaulle").

He believes Basque is a "primitive language" ("una lengua tan primitiva") and is skeptical of the theory of evolution.

== Awards ==
- 2000: Cartagena's Historical Novel Award for La mandrágora de las doce lunas
- 2002: Las Lucas Biography Award for Lincoln
- 2004: Ediciones Martínez Roca's Spirituality Award for El testamento del pescador (The Fisherman's Testament)
- 2004: Jaén Literary Award for El último tren a Zúrich (Last Train to Zurich)
- 2005: Premio de Novela Ciudad de Torrevieja for Los Hijos de la Luz (The Children of the Light)
- 2005: The Academy of Science, Technology, Education, and Humanities' (AICTEH) Social Sciences Award
- 2005: Silver Microphone (Micrófono de Plata)
- 2005: Antena de Oro
- 2005: HazteOir Award
- 2005: Catholic Childhood Commission (Comisión Católica Española de la Infancia; CCEI) Prize
- 2006: Premio de Novela Histórica Alfonso X El Sabio for El fuego del cielo (The Fire from Heaven)
- 2006: Algaba Prize for Biography, Autobiography, Memoirs and Historical Investigations for Pablo, el judío de Tarso
- 2008: Asociación de Víctimas del Terrorismo Golden Pen Award (Pluma de Oro)
- 2008: Finis Terrae Heterodox Humanist Essay Prize (El premio Finis Terrae de Ensayo Humanista Heterodoxo) for El caso Lutero
- 2012: Awarded by the Israeli Embassy for bettering the relationship between Spain and Israel
- 2013: Order of the Torson's Golden Torso (Torsón de oro) Award
- 2021: Mexican Press Club
- 2022: Spanish Evangelical Publishers Association's Harold Kregel Award (Book of the Year) for Apóstol para las naciones
