= Maria Nowak =

Maria Nowak may refer to:

- Maria Nowak (economist) (1935–2022), Polish-French economist
- Maria Nowak (politician) (born 1950), Polish politician
- Maria Nowak-Vogl, Australian child psychiatrist
