= Maurice de Patoul =

Count Maurice de Patoul (1875-1965) was a Belgian Dignitary at the court.

He was born to Léon de Patoul (1852–1926) and Countess Marie-Victorine d'Auxy de Launois (1851–1911). He served as Grand Marshal to King Albert of Belgium. Thanks to Mgr. Clemente Micara, he was awarded the Pontifical Equestrian Order of Saint Sylvester.

== Honours ==
- 1930 : Created Count de Patoul, by Royal decree.
- Commander in the Order of Leopold.
- Knight Grand Cross in the Order of the Crown.
- 1932 : Knight Grand Cross in the Pontifical Equestrian Order of Saint Sylvester Pope and Martyr
- Knight Grand Cross in the Order of the Oak Crown
