= Mahmoud Khayami =

Iranian industrialist and philanthropist (1930–2020)

- محمود خيامی
- Born: 7 January 1930; Mashhad, Imperial State of Persia
- Died: 28 February 2020 (aged 90); Los Angeles, California, U.S.
- Citizenship: French
- Occupations: Businessman and industrialist
- Spouse: Zahra Seyyedi Rashti
- Children: 5

Mahmoud Khayami, CBE, KSS, GCFO (7 January 1930 – 28 February 2020) was an Iranian industrialist and philanthropist.

== Life ==
Mahmoud Khayami was born in 1930 in Mashhad, Persia where he attended elementary and high school. In 1951 he transferred to Tehran and before long he was involved in the automotive industry. Eleven years later he inaugurated the Iran National company in partnership with his brother, Ahmad Khayami (who later formed a separate company: Kourosh Department Stores). Iran National was destined to become the largest industrial complex in Iran, today known as Iran Khodro or IKCO.

One of the leading champions of Iran's industrialization of the 1960s–70s, he began the production of the popular Peykan cars in 1967, based on cooperation with the Hillman company of England which provided the Hunter model. By 1979, 100,000 cars were produced annually with approximately 44 percent of the parts manufactured in Iran. By 1979 Iran National and its affiliated enterprises employed over 20,000 workers in Tehran, Mashhad, and Tabriz.

Although Khayami has died, his family is still involved in the automotive industry, primarily in dealership ownership of one of their previous international partners Mercedes-Benz, most notably in Berkshire, England, and Southern California where they operate Mercedes-Benz of Anaheim in the city of Anaheim, Orange County.

In later life, Mahmoud Khayami was active as a philanthropist and collector of fine Persian art, forming the Khayami Collection. He promoted inter-religious relations in the UK, and internationally, with a special emphasis on relations between the Jewish, Christian, and Muslim communities. Among his activities was the hosting at Chatham House (RIIA) of inter-religious conferences. He was involved with the Encyclopædia Iranica project and chaired the board of editors.

He split his time between the United Kingdom, the United States, and France, having been forced to leave Iran at the time of the 1979 revolution. Khayami was a resident in the UK for over 30 years and never returned to Iran. His philanthropic work (now performed largely through the Khayami Foundation) was recognised in 2004 when he was invested as a Knight of the Pontifical Order of Pope Saint Sylvester by Pope John Paul II, and in 2006 when he was invested as a Knight Commander of the Royal Order of Francis I by Prince Carlo, Duke of Castro. He had also been decorated by the late King Hussein of Jordan.

It was announced by the Department of Education and Skills in 2005 that Mr. Khayami had become a sponsor of the UK Government's Academy program and had sponsored two academies which opened in Sheffield during 2007. Both academies are run by a leading Anglican Church School Trust. He was appointed by Queen Elizabeth II as an honorary CBE in 2011 for services to education.

He appeared in the 2008 Sunday Times Rich List.

== Labour party donations ==
On 3 June 2007, the Observer reported that he had donated £1 million to the Labour Party (one of the most generous ever donations to Labour, eclipsed only by a £2m donation from the steel billionaire Lakshmi Mittal, and a similar sum given by Lord Sainsbury).
