= James Taylor (Arizona politician) =

American politician

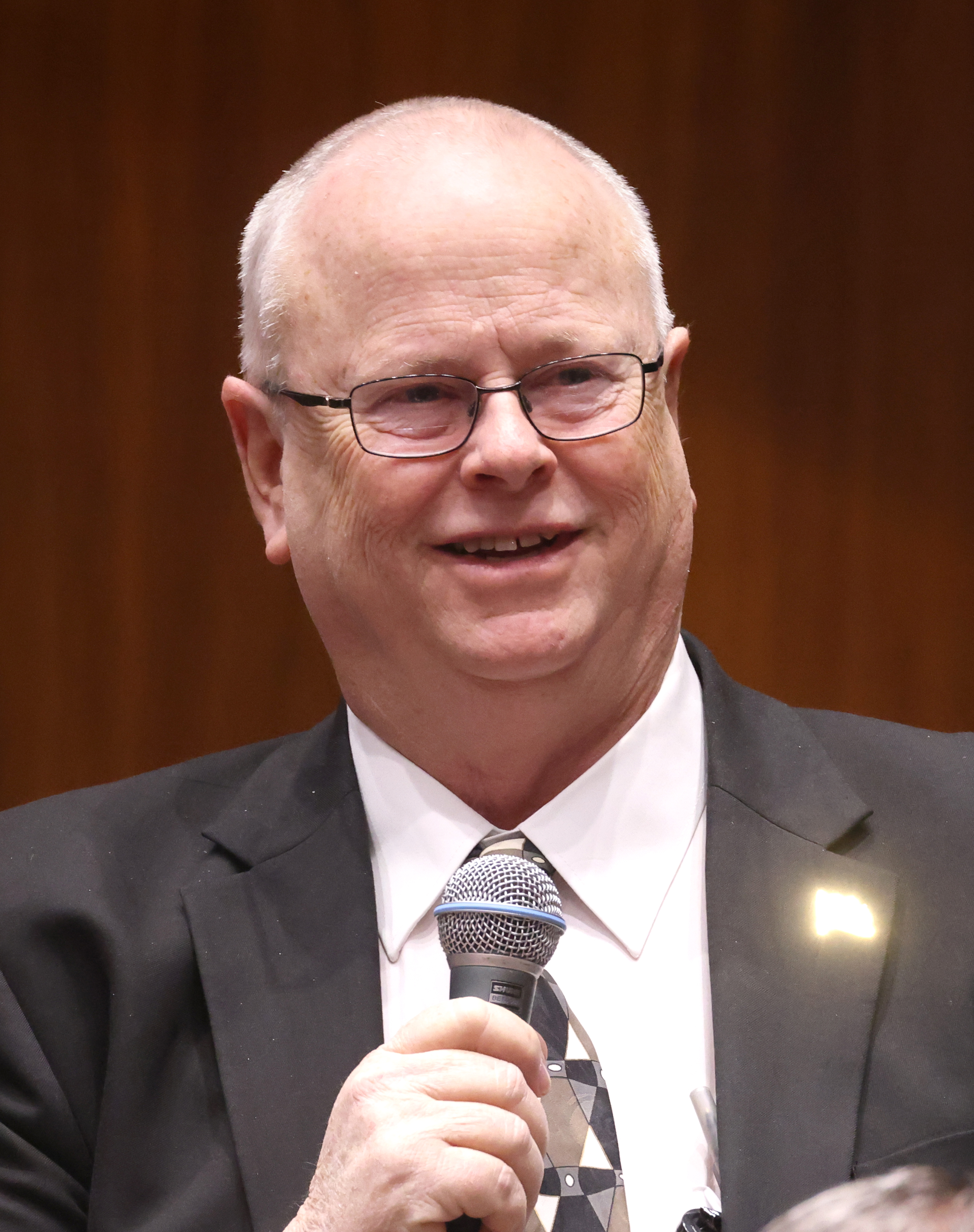
- Taylor in 2025

Member of the Arizona House of Representatives from the 29th district
- Incumbent
- Assumed office January 13, 2025 Serving with Steve Montenegro
- Preceded by: Austin Smith
- Succeeded by: Christine Scianna (elect)

Personal details
- Party: Republican

James Taylor is an American politician. He serves as a Republican member for the 29th district of the Arizona House of Representatives.
