= Maria Nowak-Vogl =

Austrian child psychiatrist known for authoritarian and repressive methods

- Born: 9 April 1922; Kitzbühel, Austria
- Died: 23 November 1998 (aged 76); Innsbruck, Austria
- Occupation(s): Child and adolescent psychiatrist
- Spouse: Johannes Heinz Nowak

Maria Nowak-Vogl (9 April 1922 – 23 November 1998) was an Austrian child and adolescent psychiatrist who directed the Kinderbeobachtungsstation in Innsbruck. A 2013 expert commission condemned her authoritarian and abusive methods, which included the experimental use of epiphysan and enforced silence, as part of a state-supported system that inflicted psychological and physical harm on disadvantaged children.

== Biography ==
Maria Vogl was one of four children of Alfred Vogl and Maria Dohnal. Alfred Vogl was a juvenile judge at the Sondergericht in Bolzano during the German occupation of Italy in 1943/44.

In 1940, Vogl graduated from the Upper Secondary School for Girls and one year later from the Teacher Training College in Innsbruck. From 1941 she studied medicine at the University of Innsbruck, received her doctorate in 1947 and initially worked as an assistant physician at the University Clinic for Psychiatry headed by Hubert Urban. In 1949, she took a Public Medical Officer exam. Accompanying this, she studied philosophy, education and psychology at the University of Innsbruck and was awarded a second doctorate in 1952 with a dissertation entitled Die Bedeutung der kurzfristigen Umweltsveränderung in der Erziehung (The importance of short-term environmental change in education). In 1953 Vogl passed the examination to become a specialist in neurological and mental disorders. She habilitated in curative education at the University of Innsbruck in 1959 with a paper entitled Eine Studie über die Gemeinschaftsunfähigkeit (A Study of Community Incapacity) and held teaching positions at the Faculty of Philosophy and the Faculty of Medicine. In 1967, Vogl married the psychiatrist Johannes Heinz Nowak and henceforth used the surname Nowak-Vogl. The couple did not have children. In 1972 she was appointed associate professor.

Nowak-Vogl was admitted to the service of the state of Tyrol as a welfare physician and headed the Kinderbeobachtungsstation (child psychiatric observation ward) of the state of Tyrol from 1954 to 1987. In addition, she taught at the College for Social Work of Caritas Innsbruck and was an expert witness for child and adolescent psychiatry at the regional courts of Innsbruck and Feldkirch as well as at the ecclesiastical marriage courts of the diocese of Innsbruck and the diocese of Salzburg.

== Supervision of the children's observation ward (1954-1987) ==
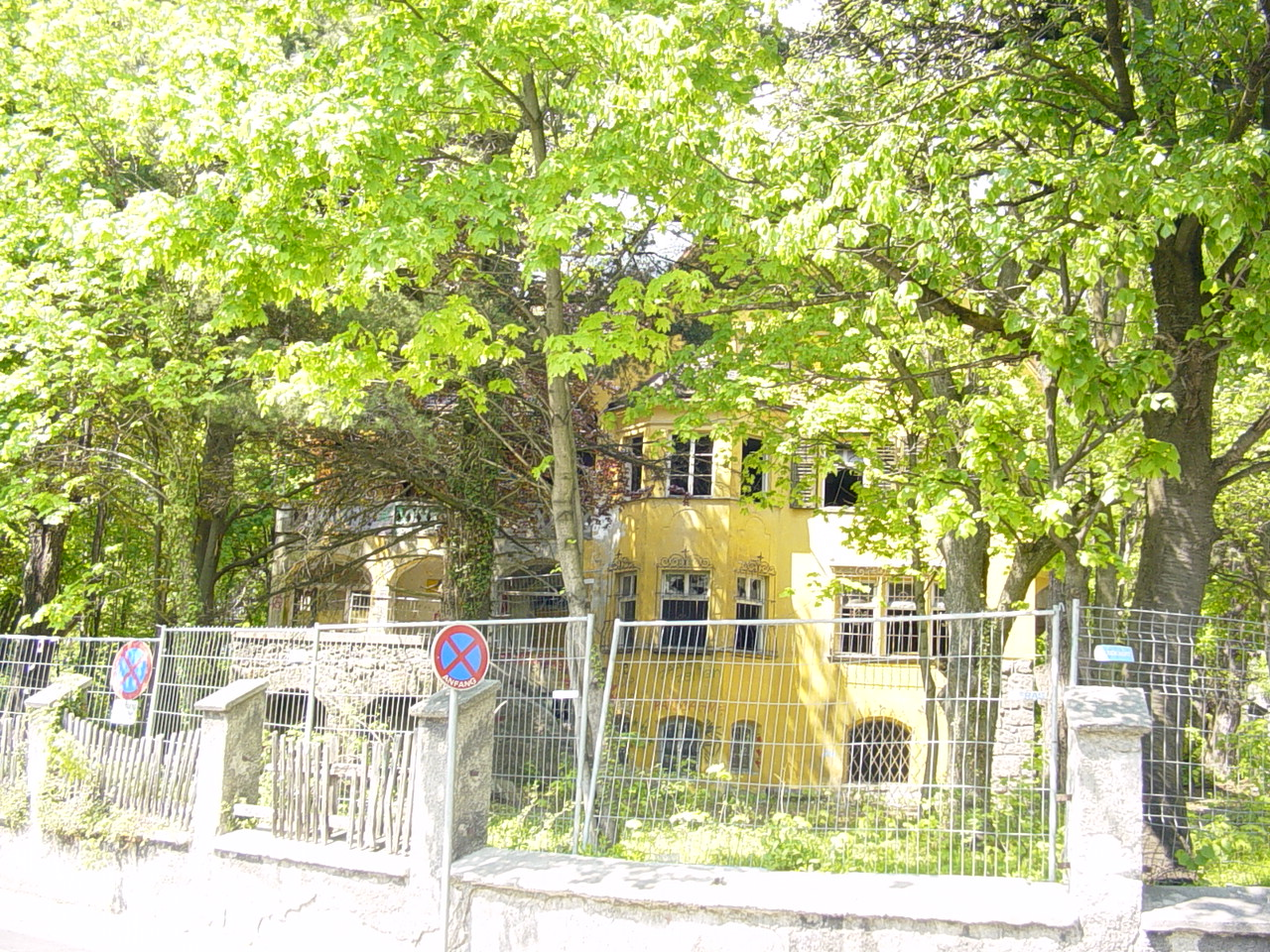
The former child observation ward of Maria Nowak-Vogl in Innsbruck, Austria. (2006)

Maria Nowak-Vogl's treatment methods led to the first critical inquiries in the 1980s. Since 2010, Nowak-Vogl's work in the observation ward has increasingly been called into question. In November 2013, a commission of experts set up by the Medical University of Innsbruck submitted a report in which the administration of medication and the physical violence used in Nowak-Vogl's treatment of the children were highlighted. The commission recommended a further scientific investigation. This was completed in an interdisciplinary research project of the Departments of Education, History and European Ethnology as well as the Department of Contemporary History at the University of Innsbruck.

In the years 1954-1987 Nowak-Vogl managed the so-called Kinderbeobachtungsstation (children's observation ward) at Sonnenstraße 44 in Innsbruck, which had been founded in 1954 as a "psychiatric children's ward." During that period, 3650 documented patients were housed there for an average of six to eight weeks. Many of the former residents of the home experienced their stay in the children's observation ward as a traumatic experience, with negative consequences for the rest of their lives. The former residents as well as some former employees of the child observation ward testify of an authoritarian and uncaring home atmosphere, in which the patients were not treated like children in need of attention, but like "inferior human beings." In interviews, those involved described the director, Maria Nowak-Vogl, as an "unmoved and cold person, an uncaring and unemotional as well as frightening supervisor, who despised and scorned them, at times coldly punishing them, at other times screaming hysterically, at times also a penalizer, who did not shy away from physical violence. In unison, those affected reported a climate of threat - of punishment, adverse consequences, or transfer to a reformatory."

Maria Nowak-Vogl also injected children with the hormone drug Epiphysan in order to test its suitability for the treatment of "hypersexuality." These injections took place within the framework of studies, the methods of which are considered unscientific by today's standards. The children concerned and their legal guardians were neither asked for their consent to participate in the studies, nor were they informed about the studies at all.

The life story of a former patient of Maria Nowak-Vogl, Evy Mages, a photojournalist in Washington, D.C. in the United States, has been narrated in 2023 by Margaret Talbot for The New Yorker.

== Published works ==
- Maria Nowak-Vogl: Die Bedeutung der kurzfristigen Umweltsveränderung in der Erziehung. Innsbruck: Dissertation, 1951.
- Maria Nowak-Vogl: Begabung fällt nicht vom Himmel. Wie man durch Erziehung Lücken füllt. Wien: Herder, 1979. ISBN 978-3-451-18076-7

== Awards ==
- In 1997 Nowak-Vogl was honoured with the Grand Cross of the Order of St. Sylvester
