= Order of St. Sylvester =

Papal Order of Knighthood of the Holy See

Pontifical Equestrian Order of Saint Sylvester Pontifex Maximus: Ordo Sancti Silvestri Papae (Latin); Ordine di San Silvestro Papa (Italian)
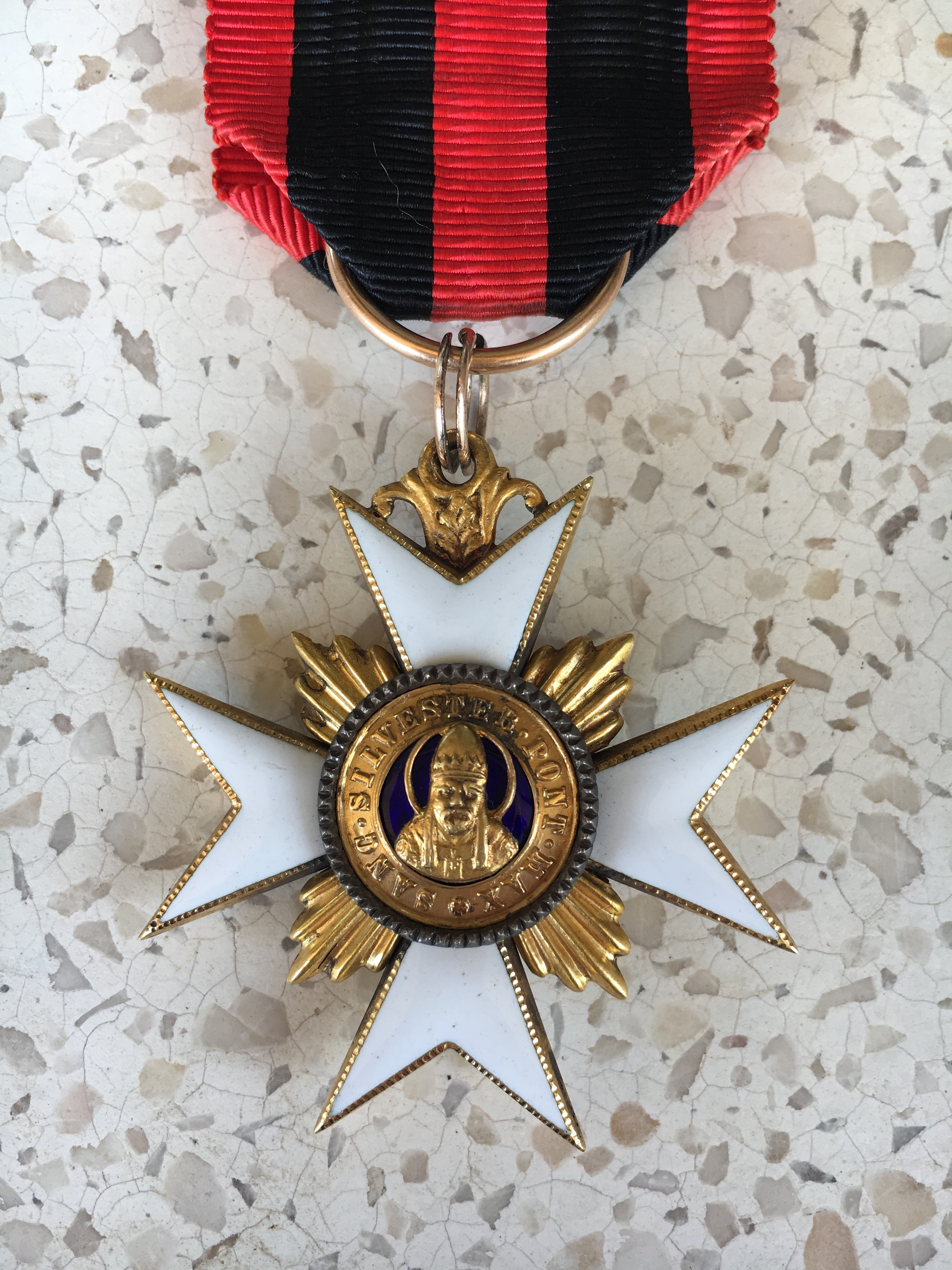
- Knight's cross of the Order of St. Sylvester

Awarded by the Holy See
- Type: Papal order of knighthood
- Established: 1841; 185 years ago
- Religious affiliation: Catholic
- Motto: Multum in Parvo (Latin); Much in Little (English)
- Status: Currently constituted
- First head: Pope Pius X
- Sovereign: Pope Leo XIV
- Classes: Knight/Dame Grand Cross (GCSS); Knight/Dame Commander with Star (KC*SS/DC*SS); Knight/Dame Commander (KCSS/DCSS); Knight/Dame (KSS/DSS)

Statistics
- First induction: 7 February 1905

Precedence
- Next (higher): Order of St. Gregory the Great
- Next (lower): Pro Ecclesia et Pontifice
- Ribbon bar of the order

The Pontifical Equestrian Order of Saint Sylvester (Latin: Ordo Sancti Silvestri Papae, Italian: Ordine di San Silvestro Papa), sometimes referred to as the Sylvestrine Order, or the Pontifical Order of Pope Saint Sylvester, is one of five orders of knighthood awarded directly by the Pope as Supreme Pontiff and head of the Catholic Church and as the Head of State of Vatican City. It is intended to honour Catholic laypeople who are actively involved in the life of the Church, particularly as it is exemplified in the exercise of their professional duties and mastership of the different arts. The order has been bestowed upon members of other Christian denominations as well, in addition to those of other religions.

== History ==
This Order was at one time united with the Order of the Golden Militia. Pope Pius X in his motu proprio of 7 February 1905, entitled Multum ad excitandos, divided the Sylvestrine Order into two Orders of Knighthood, one retaining the name of St. Sylvester and the other taking the ancient name of the Order, i.e. Order of the Golden Militia, or Order of the Golden Spur.

It is intended to honour Catholic laypeople who are actively involved in the life of the Church, particularly as it is exemplified in the exercise of their professional duties and mastership of the different arts. It is also conferred on non-Catholics, with recipients including members of other Christian denominations, such as Anglicans, as well as those of other religions, including Muslims and Jews. The Knights of Saint Sylvester used to have the privilege of riding a horse inside Saint Peter's in Rome, the same privilege accorded to the other major pontifical orders.

Awards of the Order are generally made on the recommendation of Diocesan Bishops or of Apostolic Nuncios (nominations may be made by parish priests to their bishop for his consideration). Awards are also granted on recommendation of the Papal Secretary of State. In 1994 Pope John Paul II extended membership in the Order to ladies as well as gentlemen.

=== Regulations of Gregory XVI ===
Prior to 1841, it was known as the Militia of the Golden Spur or Golden Militia, and though it is not historically established who among the many supposed founders is the true one, yet it undoubtedly is the oldest and, at one time, was one of the most prized of the papal orders. Faculties granted to the Sforza family, to the College of Abbreviators, and to bishops assistant at the throne to create Knights of the Golden Militia resulted in lavish bestowal and diminished prestige of the decoration.

Pope Gregory XVI in his Papal Brief of 31 October 1841, entitled Quod hominum mentes, retained the ancient name of the Order and placed it under the patronage of St. Sylvester (one of its alleged founders). He withdrew all faculties to whom and by whomsoever given, and forbade the use of the title or the decoration to all knights created by any means other than a Papal Brief. To restore the Order to its ancient glory and splendour, he limited the number of Commanders to 150 and knights to 300 (for the Papal States only), and appointed the Cardinal of Apostolic Briefs as Chancellor of the Order, with the duty of preserving the name, grade, number and date of admission of each knight.

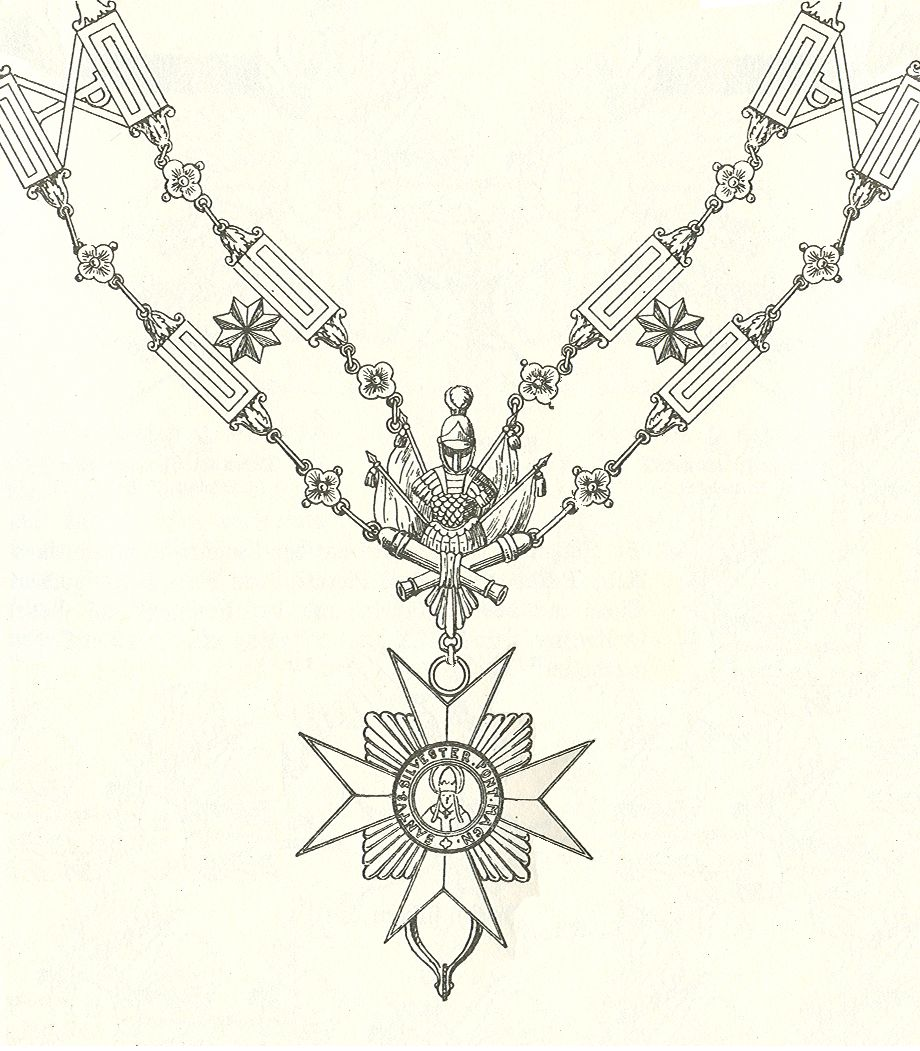
Golden Chain of the Order of Saint Sylvester and the Golden Militia prior to 1905.

Pope Gregory divided the Order into two classes:

- Commander wore a large-sized decoration suspended at the neck, on a wide ribbon.
- Knight wore a small-sized decoration on the left side of the breast, on a smaller ribbon.

=== Regulations of Pius X ===
The Order currently has four classes. In order of seniority, they are:

- Knight/Dame Grand Cross (GCSS) – wears a large cross suspended from a broad ribbon (sash) over the right shoulder across the breast to the left hip, along with the breast star.
- Knight/Dame Commander with Star (KC*SS/DC*SS) – wears the star of the Order on the lower left breast.
- Knight Commander (KCSS) – wears a smaller cross suspended by the ribbon of the Order encircling the neck. Dame Commander (DCSS) – wears the same cross suspended from a bow on the left breast. This class is divided into two categories.
- Knight/Dame (KSS/DSS) – wears the smallest cross on a ribbon attached to the left breast of the tunic.

Each recipient may illustrate their Papal knighthood with post-nominal lettering as seen above.

== Insignia ==
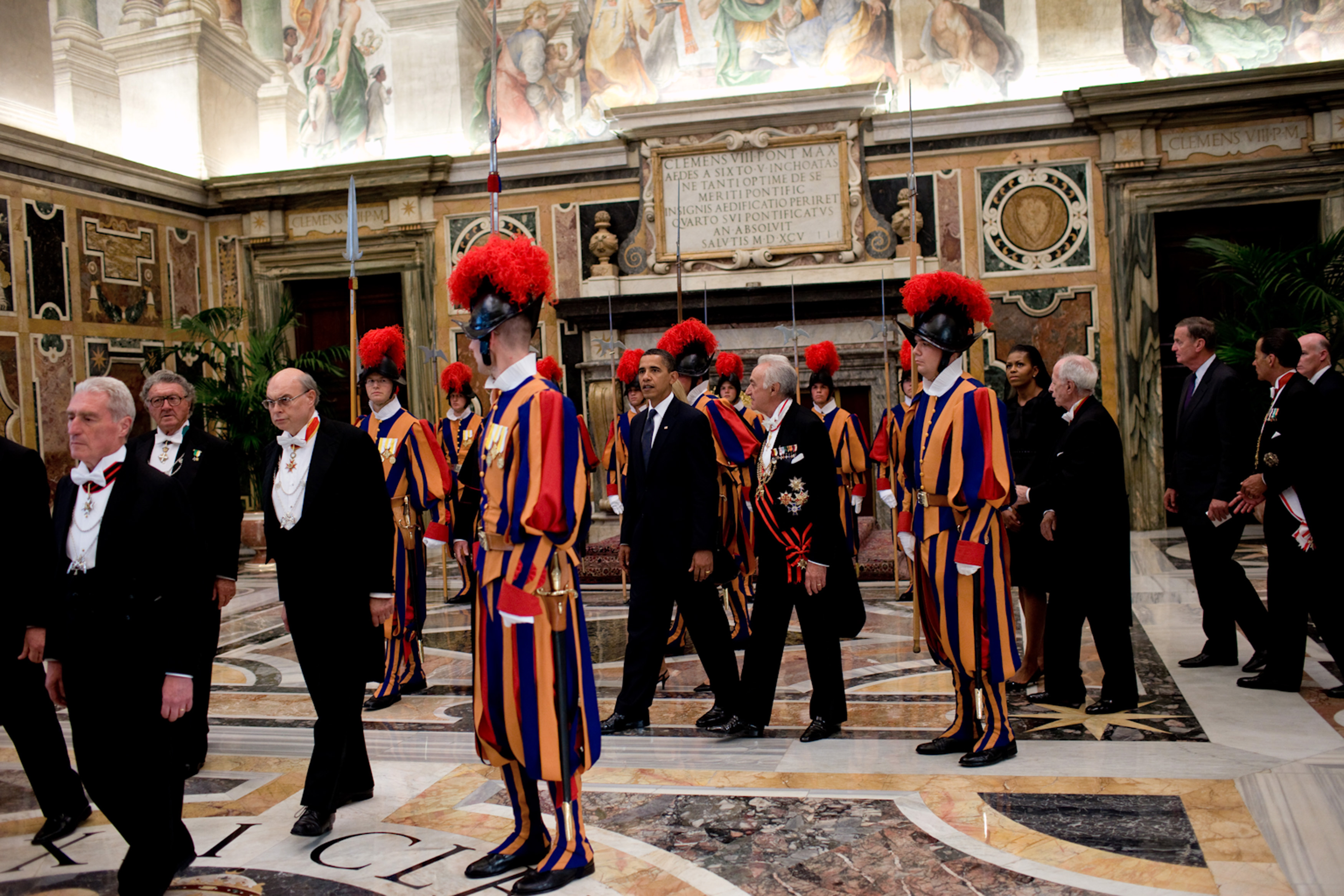
U.S. President Barack Obama escorted through the Clementine Hall by papal gentlemen wearing the insignia of Knight Grand Cross, 2009

The current decoration or cross of the Order is a gold cross of white enamelled surface, in the centre of which is impressed the image of St. Sylvester, surrounded by a blue enamelled circle bearing the inscription in letters of gold SANC. SYLVESTER P. M. Others state SANC. SILVESTER. PONT. MAX., indicating the title Pontifex Maximus. On the obverse, in the centre, are the papal tiara and crossed keys with the dates of the Order's restoration under Gregory, MDCCCXXXXR, and that of the Pius X renovation, MDCCCCV, impressed in characters of gold upon a blue circle. The ribbon of the decoration is black silk with three narrow red stripes. The star or badge is the cross of the Order attached to a silver star.

== Uniform ==
The official uniform is a black coat ornamented with one row of gilt buttons, black velvet, gold-embroidered collar and cuffs, black gold-striped trousers, a bicornered cocked silk (bicorne) hat with a cockade of the papal colours to which is added a white plume when worn by a Knight Grand Cross, a black plume when worn by a Commander, and a sword. Knights Grand Cross wear a sash and a badge or star on the left side of the breast; Commanders wear a cross around the neck; and Knights wear a smaller cross on the left breast of the uniform. The uniform is considerably more embroidered for the higher ranks and white gloves are usually worn.

Knight	Knight Commander	Knight Commander with Star	Knight Grand Cross

== Heraldry ==
In ecclesiastical heraldry, laypersons awarded the rank Grand Cross display a blue enamelled circle bearing the inscription in letters of gold SANC. SYLVESTER P. M around the shield in their coat of arms, while other ranks place an appropriate ribbon below the shield.

== Obligations ==
Papal knights and dames do not have any specific obligations by virtue of their having been given the personal honour of membership in an Order. However, it is customary for them to be invited to participate in major events of their diocese, such as the consecration of bishops, the ordination of priests, and the introduction of a new bishop into his diocese. On such formal occasions, they would wear the uniform of the Order.

== Notable members ==
- Chick Parsons, American WWII intelligence operative in Southeast Asia, businessman.
- Junichi Paul Cho/ Jang Soon Il, Korean-Chinese Indonesian Scholar, Fellow Founder of Atma Jaya Catholic University of Indonesia, Silver Medal, 1989
- Archduke Otto von Habsburg, Crown Prince of Austria and Hungary and former MEP.
- Oskar Schindler, German industrialist and Yad Vashem, Knight Grand Cross.
- Joseph Ee Peng Liang, Singaporean businessman and philanthropist, Knight Grand Cross, 1992
- Ken Harada, Japanese envoy to the Holy See, into the order.
- William Joseph Donovan, U.S. Army Major General and father of the CIA, Knight Grand Cross.
- Frans Seda, Minister Transportation of Indonesia, Knight Grand Cross, 1964
- George Borg Olivier, Prime Minister of Malta, Knight Grand Cross.
- George, Duke of Mecklenburg, head of the House of Mecklenburg-Strelitz, Knight Grand Cross
- Karl August, 10th Prince of Thurn and Taxis, German Prince, Knight Grand Cross.
- Joseph Flores, Governor of Guam.
- Bob Hope, KBE, entertainer.
- Jagatjit Singh of Kapurthala Maharaja of Khapurthala.
- Sir Burton Hall Chief Justice of The Bahamas and Justice of the UN International Court at The Hague, Knight.
- Prince Sadruddin Aga Khan, Knight Commander.
- Charles Delporte, Belgian artist, Knight.
- Shūsaku Endō, Japanese author, Knight Commander.
- José Patricio Guggiari, president of Paraguay.
- Arthur Schneier, Austrian-American Holocaust survivor, rabbi and activist.
- Lorenz Weinrich, German historian, Knight Commander with Star.
- Martín Marciales Moncada, Venezuelan philanthropist, Knight.
- Austin Mardon, Canadian author, community leader, and disability rights advocate.
- Catherine Mardon, Canadian author, activist, and lawyer.
- Maria Nowak-Vogl Disgraced Austrian psychiatrist who abused disadvantaged children, Knight Grand Cross.
- Count Maurice de Patoul, Grand Marshall of the Royal Court.
- Count Pierre Ryckmans, Governor-General of the Belgian Congo.
- Ludwig Pollak, Czech-born Art historian, museum director in Rome, Knight Commander.
- Dewan Bahadur Chevalier Ignatius Xavier Pereira, Ceylonese businessman and politician, Knight Commander.
- Stanislav Zachar, Slovak builder, co-founder of Matica Slovenska, Knight, 1928.
- John Charles Buckley, Irishman who served in the army of the Papal State in the 1860s.
- Jan Count Dobrzenský z Dobrzenicz, 50th Grand Master of the Military and Hospitaller Order of Saint Lazarus of Jerusalem, Knight, 2016.
- Brady Brim-DeForest, entrepreneur and philanthropist, 2026.
- Charles Columbe, Author and papal historian, Knight Commander.
- Anthony Bailey, inter-faith campaigner, Knight Grand Cross.
- General Sir Richard Lawson, Commander-in-Chief of Allied Forces Northern Europe, Knight Commander.
- Professor David Khalili, art collector, Knight Commander.
- Mahmoud Khayami, businessman and interfaith campaigner, Knight.
- Don Maclean, entertainer, Knight.
- Peter Obi, politician, businessman.
- Michael Otedola, politician who served as Governor of Lagos State during the Third Nigerian Republic.
- Lorenzo Balbi, Maltese philanthropist.
- Hifumi Katō, retired professional shogi player.
- Juraj Lexmann, Slovak musicologist, Knight Commander.
- Douglas Mews, New Zealand composer and church organist.

== See also ==
- Papal Orders of Knighthood

== Bibliography ==
- Rock, P.M.J. (1908) Pontifical Decorations, The Catholic Encyclopedia, New York, Robert Appleton Company
- Moroni, Diz., XI, 6 sqq.; XVIII, 210 sqq.; XLIX, 81 sq q.; LXIV, 91 sqq.; LXVIII, 238 sqq.
- Giobbio, Lezioni di diplomazia ecclesiastica (Rome, 1899), Part I, lib. I, cap. x, art. iv, 514 sqq.
- André-Wagner, Dict. de Droit Canonique, III, 83, 501; IV, 361
- Battandier, Ann. Pont. Cath., 1901, 483 sqq.; 1902, 468 sqq.; 1908, 646 sq. For a list of knights of all the decorations see Ann. for 1905. 1907, and 1908; Pii IX P. M. Acta, Part I, 43 sq., 195 sq.; IV, 391 sq.
- Bernasconi, Acta Gregorii papæ XVI, 48; III, 179 sq.; Analecta Ecclesiastica (Rome, 1905), 99 sq.; 1907, 189; Leonis XIII Pont. Max. Acta (Rome), VIII, 259, 282; XXI, 74
