= Steve Montenegro =

American politician (born 1981)

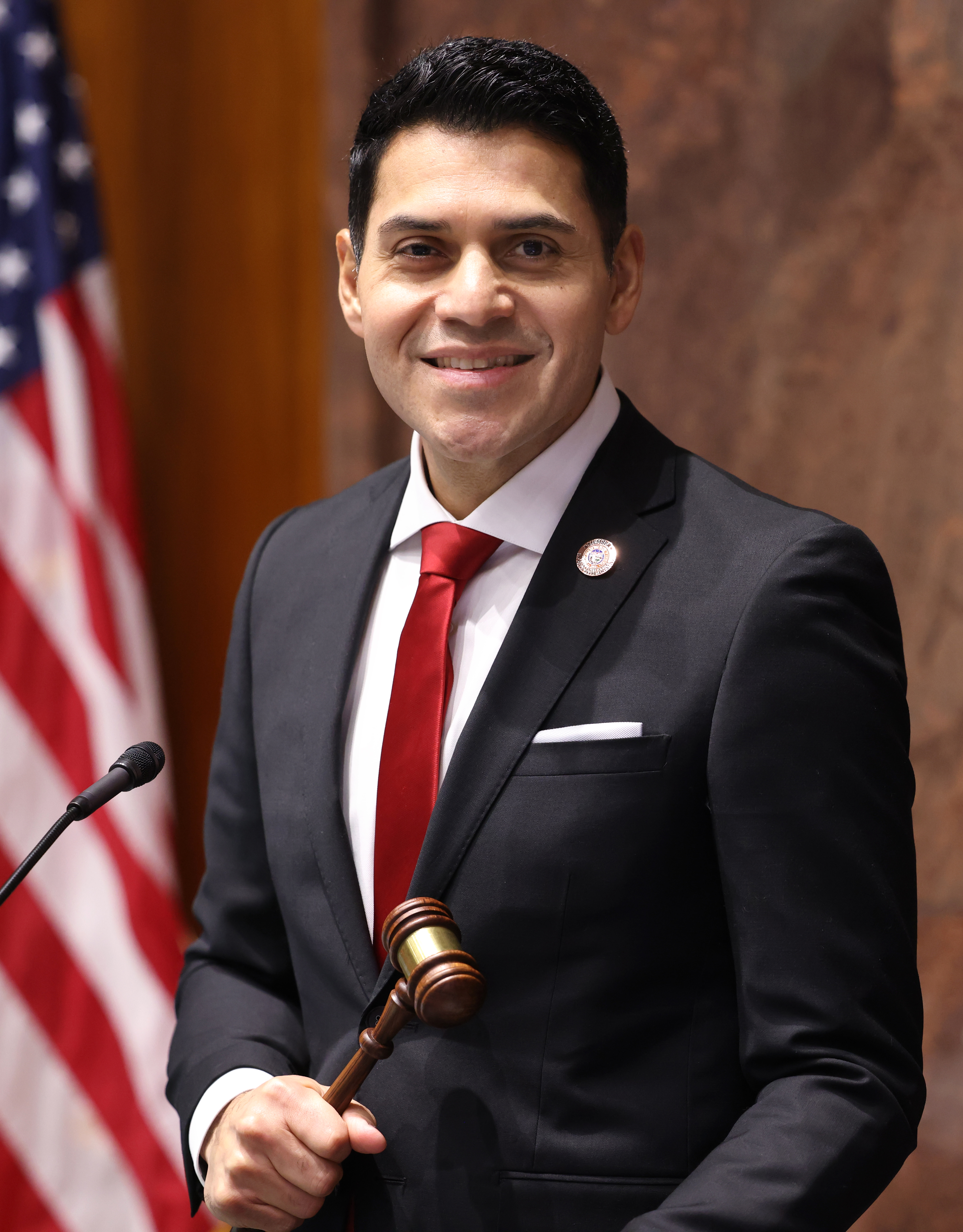
- Montenegro in 2025

56th Speaker of the Arizona House of Representatives
- Incumbent
- Assumed office January 13, 2025
- Preceded by: Ben Toma

Member of the Arizona House of Representatives
- Incumbent
- Assumed office January 9, 2023 Serving with James Taylor
- Preceded by: Richard Andrade
- Constituency: 29th district (2023–present)
- In office January 12, 2009 – January 9, 2017
- Preceded by: John B. Nelson
- Succeeded by: Don Shooter
- Constituency: 12th district (2009–2013); 13th district (2013–2017)

Member of the Arizona Senate from the 13th district
- In office January 9, 2017 – December 15, 2017
- Preceded by: Don Shooter
- Succeeded by: Sine Kerr

Personal details
- Born: 1981 (age 44–45) El Salvador
- Party: Republican
- Spouse: Melissa
- Children: 1
- Education: Logos University (attended); Arizona State University, Tempe (BS)
- Website: Campaign website

Steve Montenegro (born 1981) is a Salvadoran-American politician. A member of the Republican party, he was elected as a member of the Arizona House of Representatives in 2022. He is a former member of the Arizona Senate. He was previously a member of the Arizona House of Representatives, from 2009 to 2017, where he was Speaker Pro Tempore.

In 2014, Montenegro was chosen to serve as Majority Leader in the 2015–2017 session. He resigned from the state senate on December 15, 2017 to focus on his congressional campaign. He ran unsuccessfully for the Republican nomination for Arizona's 8th congressional district special election, 2018. In 2025, he became the first Hispanic Speaker of the Arizona House of Representatives.

== Early life ==
Montenegro was born in El Salvador and at age four immigrated to the United States with his family. According to his official biography, he graduated magna cum laude from Arizona State University with a B.S. in Political Science. He also holds an Associate of Arts in Theology from CBAN and Logos Christian University.

== Political career ==
Before his election to the state House, Montenegro was a district representative for Republican Congressman Trent Franks.

Montenegro was elected to the Arizona House of Representatives in November 2008, succeeding John B. Nelson. He represents Legislative District 13 (the former District 12), which includes Goodyear, Litchfield Park, Avondale, and also Luke Air Force Base.

Montenegro was a Donald Trump delegate at the 2016 Republican National Convention. He was also a frequent defender of the President on national TV, where his status as a conservative Latino made him a popular foil for liberal hosts and guests like Jorge Ramos, Anna Navarro, Chris Cuomo, and Jake Tapper.

He was the only Hispanic in the Arizona legislature to vote for the highly controversial Arizona SB 1070. In response to accusations of racial profiling of Hispanics, he replied by saying that "This bill has nothing to do with race or profiling. It has to do with the law. We are seeing a lot of crime here in Arizona because of the open borders that we have."

In 2025, Montenegro was elected Speaker of the Arizona House of Representatives.

=== Election fraud allegations ===
During the controversial 2021 audit, Montenegro was one of the people who had control over the combative and controversial “Audit War Room” Twitter account. Montenegro has also appeared alongside Patrick Byrne, Michael Flynn, Jovan Hutton Pulitzer, and other election conspiracy theorists in his capacity as an executive with The America Project.

In 2023, Montenegro filed a complaint alleging corruption in the Tempe Council race but withdrew his claims within 24 hours, the same day it was revealed through the public record disclosure of texts with CyberNinja's CEO Doug Logan that he had met privately with Logan while the audit was underway at a hotel in Scottsdale.

=== 2018 congressional race ===
Montenegro resigned his seat in the Arizona Senate in order to run full time for the Republican nomination to the U.S. House of Representatives in the special election in Arizona's 8th congressional district in 2018. He had been endorsed by U.S. Representative Trent Franks (who held the seat until his resignation in 2017 following accusations of sexual misconduct). He was also endorsed by former Sheriff Joe Arpaio. During his campaign, Montenegro emphasized his support for President Donald Trump.

During the campaign, it was revealed that he had received nude selfies and other sexual pictures from a female capitol staffer, although her attorney confirmed there was no physical relationship between the two. The staffer reportedly sent multiple sexual pics of herself, including a topless photo, to which Montenegro requested she send them on Snapchat, which deletes photos immediately. Montenegro initially called the story "false tabloid trash", but when texts of the files were presented indicating not only his acceptance of the photos, but being an active participant in the sexting, he admitted to the story and denied only a few parts. He ultimately said, "I am confident the voters will see through these deplorable pack of lies thrown out by a liberal attorney with a clear agenda of attacking conservatives."

He was subsequently defeated in the GOP primary by former AZ State Senator Debbie Lesko, who went on to defeat the Democratic nominee Hiral Tipirneni.

== Personal life ==
He has served on the Advisory Board of the Arizona Charter Academy. He is also Oneness Apostolic Pentecostal and a member of the United Pentecostal Church International.

== Elections ==
- 2016 Term limited, and with incumbent Senator Don Shooter running for the house instead, Montenegro ran for the Arizona senate, defeating Diane Landis in the Republican Primary and was unopposed in the general election.
- 2014 Montenegro and Darin Mitchell defeated Diane Landis in the Republican primary. Mitchell and Montenegro defeated Steve Hansen in the general election.
- 2012 Redistricted to District 13, Montenegro ran in the three-way August 28, 2012 Republican Primary; Montenegro placed first, Darin Mitchell placed second with 8,572 votes, and Representative Russell Jones, who was redistricted from District 24, placed third; Montenegro won the first seat in the 2012 general election.

Political offices
Preceded by Ben Toma	Speaker of the Arizona House of Representatives; 2025–present	Incumbent
