= Christine Scianna =

American politician

Member-elect of the Arizona House of Representatives from the 29th district
- Assuming office January 2027
- Succeeding: James Taylor

Personal details
- Party: Democratic

Christine Scianna is an American politician. A member of the Democratic Party, she is the member-elect for the 29th district of the Arizona House of Representatives.
