= Catherine Mardon =

Canadian writer, activist, and lawyer

Catherine Mardon is a Canadian writer, activist, and lawyer.

== Biography ==
Catherine Mardon was born in Oklahoma, but spent many years living in St. Petersburg, Florida. She currently lives in Canada. Her academic background includes a Bachelor of Science in Agriculture from Oklahoma State University, a Juris Doctor from the University of Oklahoma, and a Bachelor of Art from Newman University. She received a Master's degree in Theological Studies from Newman Theological College in Edmonton, Alberta, Canada.

Mardon is a social activist, having worked for family farmers, with ecumenical organizations, for the homeless, and as a speaker on social justice issues. She was admitted to the Oklahoma Bar in 1988. Her legal practice also included archdiocesan tribunal work, death penalty appeals, and a variety of low income concerns. Mardon was also a mediation trainer responsible for the recruitment, training, supervision and evaluation of over 180 volunteer mediators.

After being attacked in 1991 for providing testimony against the leader of a white supremacist group, which left her with physical injuries, a traumatic brain injury and PTSD, she became a disability rights advocate.

Mardon has written many books on mental illness and a series of children's books that have been translated into 18 different languages.

She is married to fellow writer and activist Austin Mardon

== Bibliography ==
- Curveballs (2012)
- Gandy and Parker Escape the Zoo: An Illustrated Adventure (2013, with Austin Mardon)
- Screwballs (2015)
- Gandy and the Princess (2015, with Austin Mardon)
- Gandy and the Cadet (2015)
- Gandy and the Man in White (2016, with Austin Mardon)
- Gandy and the Man in Black. (2016)
- Gandy and the Underwater City(2017)
- Gandy and the Sea Cow(2016)
- Gandy and the Mastodon(2015)
- Gandy At the Beach (2017)
- Gandy and the Fiddler (2017)
- Gandy and the Lumberjack (2017)
- Gandy and the Bonefish (2017)
- Gandy and the Lady (2018)
- Gandy and Christopher
- Gandy and the Musician (2017)
- Gandy and the Piper
- Canadian Polar Explorers
- Alphabet Soup
- Therapeutic Parenting
- Hoarding the Family Secret Behind Closed Doors.
- Listen to the Right Voices: Pastoral Care of Persons with Schizophrenia
- The A Word
- How to Build and Maintain Relationships with Mental Illness

== Awards and honors ==
- Dame Commander in the Order of St. Sylvester, a Papal Knighthood(2017)
- Sovereign's Medal for Volunteers(2018)
- King Charles III Coronation Medal (2025)
- Institute of International Peace Leader’s Peace Award (2025)
- Leon A. McNeill Distinguished Alumni Award, Newman University (2022)
- Honour Officer, Alberta Royal Canadian Army Cadets (2018)
- Regent's Distinguished Scholar - Oklahoma State University
- Marian Medal - National Conference of Catholic Bishops
- Queen Elizabeth II Diamond Jubilee Medal (2012)
- Queen Elizabeth II Platinum Jubilee Medal (2022)
- Diocesan Officer - Catholic Women's League
- Edmonton Archdiocese
- 2016 True Grit Award - The Lieutenant Governor of Alberta's Circle on Mental Health and Addiction
- Former President – Catholic Women's League, St. Alphonsus, Edmonton
- Former President – Veterans of Foreign Wars Auxiliary
