= Ernest George Mardon =

Canadian historian (1928–2016)

Ernest George Mardon (1928 – 6 March 2016) was an English professor who worked at the University of Lethbridge. He has several dozen books, mostly on the history of Alberta, Canada.

Born in Houston, Texas in 1928 to Professor Austin Mardon and Marie Dickey, Dr. Ernest G. Mardon was educated at Gordonstoun, Scotland, before attending Trinity College in Dublin. After that he was called up for military service in the Korean War as an officer with the Gordon Highlanders, serving with that outfit in the Suez Canal Zone, Cyprus, Libya, from 1952 to 1954. He was honorably discharged with the rank of lieutenant. He moved to Canada in 1954 as Bureau Manager for United Press International. He taught high school in Morinville, and then did Doctoral work in Medieval English at the University of Ottawa. Among the first Faculty of the University of Lethbridge, Dr. Mardon was also a visiting professor at several other Canadian universities. He died on 8 March 2016, in Lethbridge, Alberta, Canada.

Mardon's children include the Antarctic researcher and writer Austin Mardon.

== Selected works ==
- Narrative Unity of the Cursor Mundi (1967, 2 ed. 2012)
- The Founding Faculty of the University of Lethbridge (1968)
- When Kitty met the Ghost (1991, 2 ed. 2012)
- The Girl Who Could Walk Through Walls (1991)
- Alberta Mormon Politicians/The Mormon Contribution to Alberta Politics (1991, 2 ed. 2011)
- Early Saints (1997)
- Later Christian Saints for Children (1997)
- Many Saints for Children (1997)
- A Description of the Western Isles of Scotland (translator, 2010)
- Visionaries of a New Political Era: The Men Who Paved the Way for the Alberta Act of 1905 (2010)
- Early Saints and other Saintly Stories for Children (2011)
- The Conflict Between the Individual & Society in the Plays of James Bridie (2012)
- Who's Who in Federal Politics in Alberta (2012)
