= State Board of Administration of Florida =

Florida retirement fund

- Founded: 1943
- Headquarters: The Hermitage Center; 1801 Hermitage Blvd. Tallahassee, Florida, US
- Key people: Ron DeSantis (Chairman); Chris Spencer (Executive Director & CIO)
- Website: www.sbafla.com

The State Board of Administration of Florida (SBA) manages 25 investment funds and trust clients.

Trusts are investment responsibilities allowed under law and established pursuant to trust agreements or other forms of consent with individual clients. Three of the SBA's 25 funds are government investment pools that contain the assets of a variety of clients. Twenty-two clients have at least some of their assets in separately managed funds. The remaining clients are invested solely in one or more of the SBA's investment pool products. Pooling smaller portfolios into larger investment funds affords economies of scale and other investment management advantages, enhancing returns for participants.

== Management and oversight ==
=== Board of trustees ===
While financial specialists at the SBA handle day-to-day operations, the agency is governed by a three-member Board of Trustees, which includes Florida's elected governor, chief financial officer, and attorney general. The current trustees are Governor Ron DeSantis, Chief Financial Officer Blaise Ingoglia and Attorney General James Uthmeier.

Each trustee appoints three people knowledgeable about financial markets to the Investment Advisory Council, which provides oversight of the SBA's funds and major investment responsibilities.

The trustees also appoint a three-member Audit Committee to serve as an independent and objective party to monitor SBA's processes for financial reporting, internal controls, risk assessment, compliance and review of the agency's independent auditors and the Office of Internal Audit. The SBA also is audited by two legislative entities: the Auditor General and the Office of Program Policy Analysis and Government Accountability.

Each trustee also appoints two members to the Participant Local Government Advisory Council (PLGAC), which reviews the administration of the local government investment pool known as Florida Prime. The PLGAC was statutorily created as an additional measure to ensure that the fund pool is operated and managed in the best interest of investors in the fund. The Board of Trustees appoints six members to serve on the PLGAC for four-year terms, subject to confirmation by the Florida Senate.

The PLGAC reviews the administration of the trust fund and makes recommendations regarding such administration to the Trustees. The PLGAC prepares and submits a written biennial report to the Trustees, the Investment Advisory Council, and the Joint Legislative Auditing Committee that describes the activities and recommendations of the council.

By statute, the Board of Trustees appoints a nine-member Florida Hurricane Catastrophe Fund Advisory Council to provide the Board with information and advice in connection with its duties related to the Florida Hurricane Catastrophe Fund (FHCF).

Because the SBA is a constitutional entity, a constitutional amendment is needed to change the way the agency is governed.

=== Florida Commission on Hurricane Loss Projection Methodology ===
The Commission on Hurricane Loss Projection Methodology was statutorily created as a panel of experts to provide actuarially sophisticated guidelines and standards for projecting hurricane losses. The commission is administered by the State Board of Administration. The Commission consists of 11 members, and the Board of Trustees annually appoints one of the commission members to serve as chair.

=== Responsibilities ===
The SBA has other responsibilities including:

- Providing personalized retirement planning and financial counseling support to members of the Florida Retirement System through the MyFRS Financial Guidance Program (created by the Florida Legislature in 2000)
- Administering the Florida Hurricane Catastrophe Fund and its associated programs
- Serving as an investment consultant to retirement programs administered by other Florida state agencies, including the State of Florida Deferred Compensation Program and the State University System Optional Retirement Program
- Managing the corporate affairs of the Inland Protection Financing Corporation, a public-private entity created to raise funds to pay reimbursement claims for pollution cleanup
- Managing the corporate affairs of the Florida Water Pollution Control Financing Corporation, which is the state's revolving fund set up to finance clean water initiatives for local water and wastewater systems
- Administering debt service funds for bonds issued according to the State Bond Act, which allows the Division of Bond Finance to issue tax-exempt bonds to provide capital financing for state and selected government agencies. The SBA also serves as an escrow agent for the bonds.
- Providing administrative support for the Division of Bond Finance and the Florida Prepaid College plans
- Generating annual, monthly, and quarterly reports detailing performance and investment activities

== Funds ==
=== Florida Retirement System Pension Fund ===
The Florida Retirement System (FRS) Pension Plan, a defined benefit plan, is one of the largest public retirement plans in the US. At year-end, it comprised over 80 percent of total assets under SBA management. The FRS Pension Plan serves a working and retired membership base of nearly one million public employees.

While investing the FRS Pension Plan assets, the SBA follows statutory guidelines and a substantial body of internal policies and procedures.

The Division of Retirement and the Florida Legislature is responsible for the administration of retirement benefits, the setting of benefit levels or the setting of contribution rates for participating employers.

The Investment Advisory Council independently oversees the FRS Pension Plan's general objectives, policies, and strategies.

The asset classes for the Florida Retirement System are Global Equities (for both developed and emerging markets), Fixed Income, Private Equity, Strategic Investments, Real Estate, and Cash.

In February 2010, the Pew Center on the United States identified four states that demonstrate different approaches to designing and managing retirement systems: Florida, Nebraska, Iowa, and Georgia. Florida's method for calculating annual contribution rates incorporates a portion of any unfunded liability into upcoming required contributions so that the bill is paid off over time. The state has legally mandated that pension surpluses of less than 5 percent of the total liabilities will be reserved to pay for unexpected losses in the system—and even if the surplus is greater than 5 percent of the total liabilities, only a fraction can be used to reduce participating employer contributions. This process allows for a rebate in required employer contributions to the FRS when the fund is more than 100% funded, and mandates employers contributions in excess of normal required contributions to make up any unfunded liability when the fund is less than 100% funded.

=== Florida Retirement System Investment Plan ===
The Florida Retirement System (FRS) Investment Plan was established by the Legislature to provide Florida's public employees with a portable, flexible alternative to the FRS traditional defined benefit plan. Since opening its first employee account roughly nine years ago, the FRS Investment Plan has become one of the largest optional public-sector defined contribution retirement plans in the US.

=== Florida PRIME ===
Florida PRIME's objective is to provide eligible participants with a cost-effective investment vehicle for their surplus funds. Its investment strategy emphasizes, in order of importance, the preservation of capital, liquidity, and competitive yield.

In response to the economic turmoil in the markets, the SBA changed its guidelines to ensure that Florida PRIME offers daily liquidity, making it possible for investors to convert 100% of any balance into cash. Legislative and policy changes require Florida PRIME to make conservative investments, purchasing short-term assets that have received independent high ratings.

=== Florida Hurricane Catastrophe Fund ===
The Florida Hurricane Catastrophe Fund (FHCF) was created in 1993 in response to the Florida property insurance crisis resulting from Hurricane Andrew. This state tax-exempt trust fund was to encourage additional insurance capacity in the state by providing a stable and ongoing source of reimbursement to insurers for a portion of their catastrophic hurricane losses. The FHCF is financed by reimbursement premiums charged to participating insurers, investment earnings, and emergency assessments on property and casualty insurers.

The Florida Hurricane Catastrophe Fund finished the year in its healthiest financial position since its creation in 1993. According to the collective assets of the Florida Hurricane Catastrophe Fund, it is the second-largest mandate of the SBA. Changes made by the Florida Legislature continue to improve the program's ability to meet its potential needs by reducing optional program coverage and gradually increasing its pricing to better reflect future claims.

=== Lawton Chiles Endowment Fund ===
Created by the Florida Legislature in 1999, the purpose of the Lawton Chiles Endowment Fund (LCEF) is to invest a portion of the state's tobacco settlement monies to provide a perpetual source of enhanced funding for health maintenance and research programs related to tobacco use.

The SBA has the statutory authority and responsibility for the investment of LCEF assets, subject to certain investment limitations and consistent with an Investment Policy Statement approved by the SBA Trustees.

Florida law specifies that the LCEF shall be managed as an annuity, with an investment objective of long-term preservation of the real value of the principal. The law requires a specified annual disbursement of funds for biomedical research activities, until when cures are found for tobacco-related cancer and heart and lung disease. Five percent of the annual disbursement is dedicated to the biomedical research portion of the endowment and shall be reinvested and applied to that portion of the endowment's principal, with the remainder to be spent on biomedical research activities consistent with this section.

== Shareholder activism ==
Florida SBA is among the signatories of the "Principles for a Responsible Civilian Firearms Industry," which seeks to engage firearms manufacturers, dealers, and retailers in promoting gun safety. The Florida SBA is one of eight institutional investors represented by the Shareholder Rights Projects, which worked to present shareholder declassification proposals in S&P 500 annual meetings.
