= Epiphysan =

Extract from the pineal gland

Epiphysan was derived as an aqueous bovine pineal gland extract. It was first produced in 1958. Epiphysan was used in animals to treat ruts. It was revoked as a veterinary agent in 2000.

== Etymology ==
The name "epiphysan" is derived from the ancient name for the pineal gland, epiphysis cerebri.

== History ==
First developed in the late 1930s and marketed as Epiphysan-Richter by the Hungarian company Gedeon Richter plc, it was based on the idea that the pineal gland had an antigonadotropic or sex-gland–inhibiting function. The extract was prescribed for conditions linked to hormonal overactivity, and was still listed in the Austrian drug index in 1996 under the name Epiphysan sold by the Austrian company, Disperga.

Epiphysan was registered as Epiphysan Disperga in 1 ml ampoules (marketing authorization number 2582), 5 ml ampoules, lingual tablets, and ampoules for animals. Disperga was the distributing company, based in Vienna. Epiphysan was listed in the pharmacy's product directory until October 1, 1996.

The supply extinguished on September 1, 1994. The marketing authorization was revoked on April 10, 2000.

== Veterinary research ==
Veterinary reports described epiphysan as producing pronounced effects on neuromuscular and autonomic function. In cases of tetanus in horses and other animals, it reduced trismus, rigidity of the axial and limb musculature, and spasms of the masticatory and cervical muscles, with progressive relaxation of previously “board-hard” muscle groups following repeated injections. In severe cases, improvement was accompanied by restoration of swallowing, return of appetite, and normalization of motor function, while persistent signs such as nictitating membrane prolapse and localized muscle stiffness reflected differential recovery of specific muscle groups. The reports also describe involvement of systemic functions including feeding behavior, posture, and locomotion and note that recovery often proceeded in stages, with early effects on jaw and neck musculature followed by gradual resolution of generalized muscular hypertonus.

== Administration ==
According to the package insert, epiphysan was administered intramuscularly (1 ml daily for three days, then up to 5 ml every third day) for hypersexuality. The 1 ml ampoules contained an extract of 0.1 g of fresh pineal gland from young cattle and 3.3 mg of methyl parahydroxybenzoate (as a stabilizer) in aqueous solution. Recommended dosage: For hypersexuality: 1 ml daily for the first 3 days, then up to 5 ml every three days.

Contraindications: hypersensitivity to any component of the preparation. Side effects: prolonged treatment with high doses can lead to gonadal atrophy.

The concentration of melatonin in the pineal gland of cows is approximately 5 nmol/g (about 1 μg/g, or one millionth of a gram per gram of tissue). A 1 ml ampoule of epiphysan contained approximately 0.5 nmol of melatonin, which corresponds to 0.1 μg.
