= Logos University =

Unaccredited private university in Jacksonville, Florida, United States

Coordinates: 30.2272°N 81.5808°W

- Former names: Logos Christian College and Graduate School
- Type: Private university
- Established: 1977; 49 years ago
- Affiliations: Florida State Board of Independent Colleges and Universities
- Religious affiliation: Interdenominational Christianity
- President: Misty Grant
- Location: Jacksonville, Florida, United States
- Website: www.logos.edu

Logos University, formerly Logos Christian College and Graduate School, is an unaccredited interdenominational private university in Jacksonville, Florida. The university offers academic degree programs designed for professional service in Christian ministry using distance learning. Although it is accredited by the Accreditation Service for International Schools, Colleges and Universities, that organization's accreditation is not recognized by the US or UK government.

== History ==
The university was established through partnering with local churches with a vision to establish an additional Christian institution, beginning in 1977. The president is Misty Grant, whose service as the fifth president began in February 2015.

== Academics ==
The university offers certificate, bachelor's, master's and doctoral degree programs. The school reported over 40,000 alumni around the world.

== Authorization ==
Logos University was authorized to grant degrees by the Florida State Board of Independent Colleges and Universities to grant degrees through religious exemption. The grounds for this exemption include "The titles of degrees issued by the institution cannot be confused with secular degree titles. For this purpose, each degree title must include a religious modifier that immediately precedes, or is included within, any of the following degrees: Associate of Arts, Associate of Science, Bachelor of Arts, Bachelor of Science, Master of Arts, Master of Science, Doctor of Philosophy, and Doctor of Education."
