= Index of Arizona-related articles =

The location of the state of Arizona in the United States

The following is an alphabetical list of articles related to the U.S. state of Arizona.

== 0–9 ==
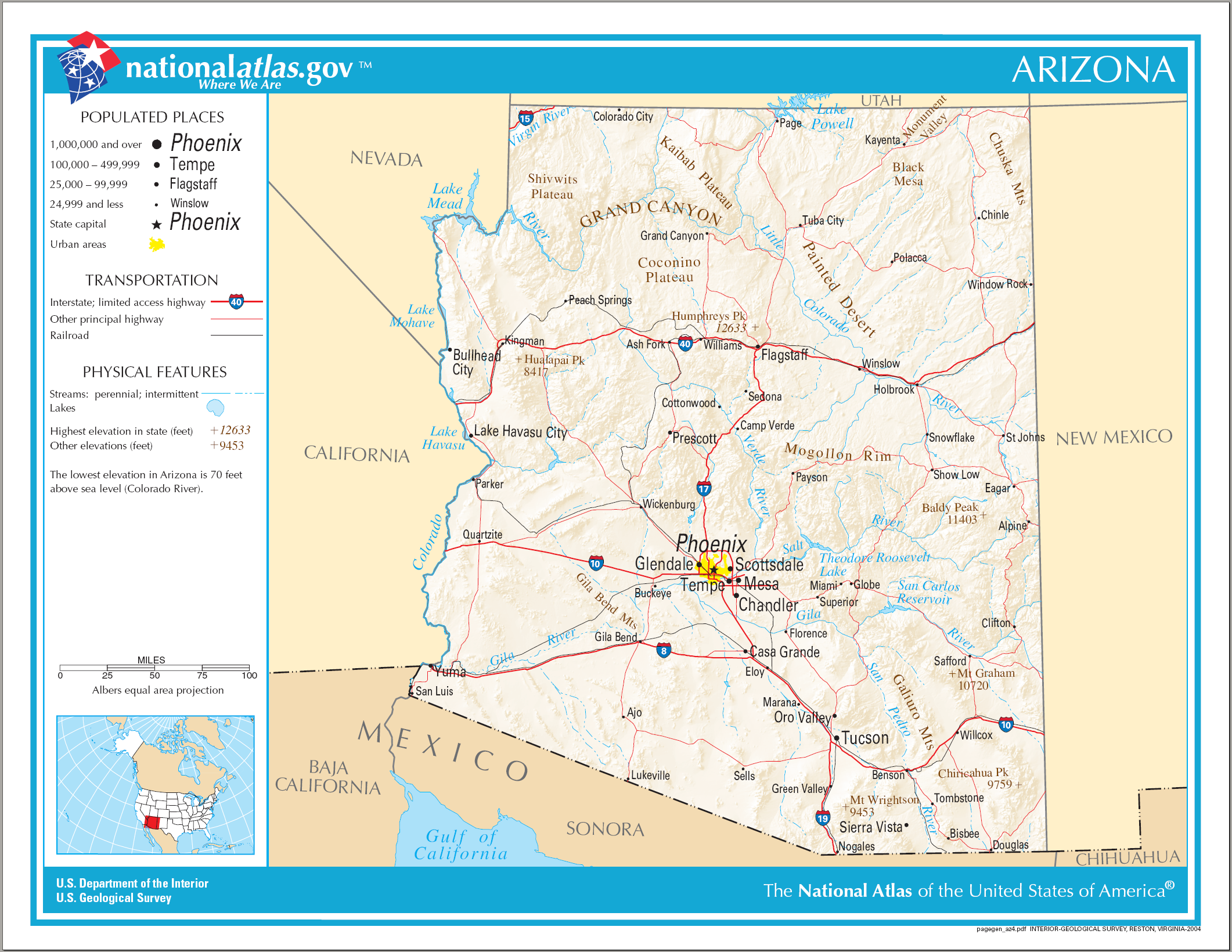
Map of Arizona

- .az.us – Internet second-level domain for the state of Arizona
- 4 Corners
  - 4 Corners Monument
- 4 Peaks
- 7-Eleven
- 32nd meridian west from Washington
- 32nd parallel north
- 33rd parallel north
- 34th parallel north
- 35th parallel north
- 36th parallel north
- 37 Geminorum
- 37th meridian west from Washington
- 37th parallel north
- 50 State Quarters
- 110th meridian west
- 111th meridian west
- 112th meridian west
- 113th meridian west
- 114th meridian west

== A ==
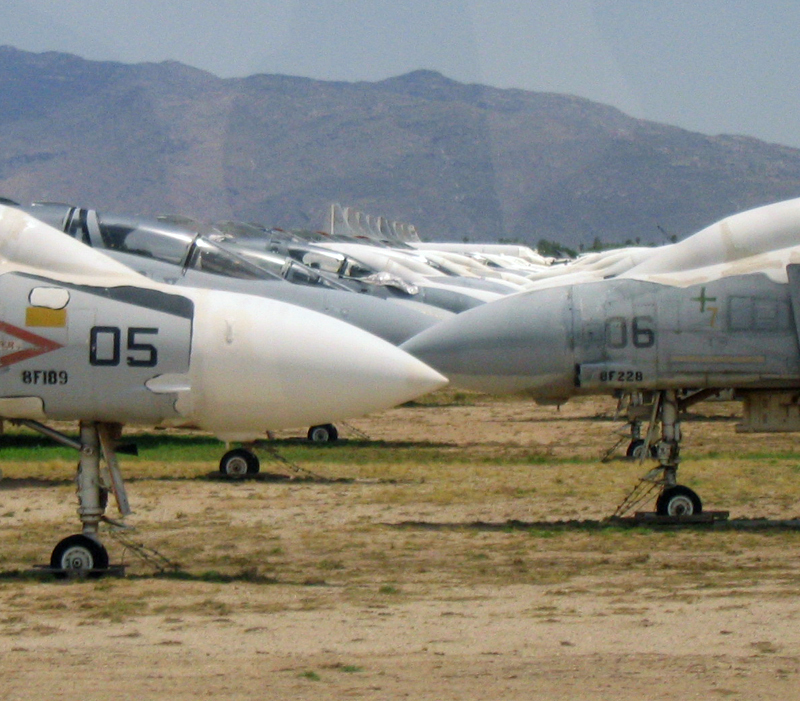
AMARC, "Boneyard", Tucson

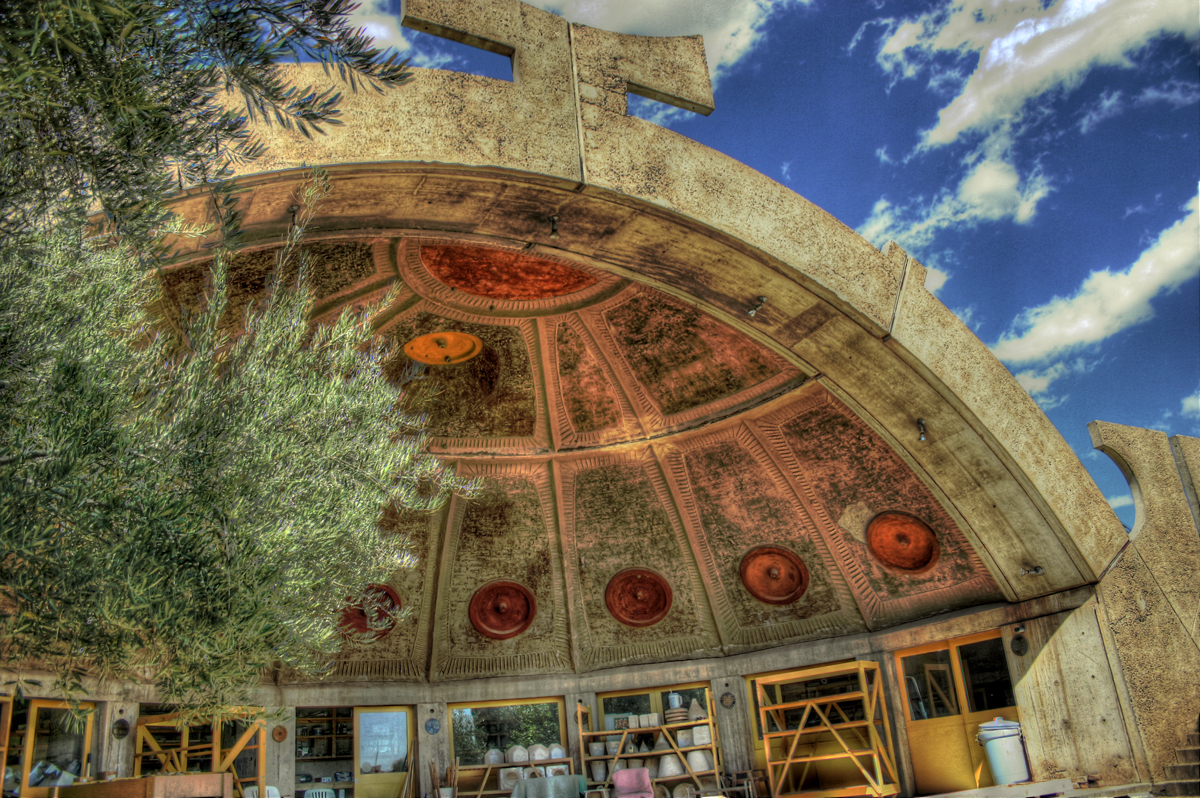
An apse at Arcosanti

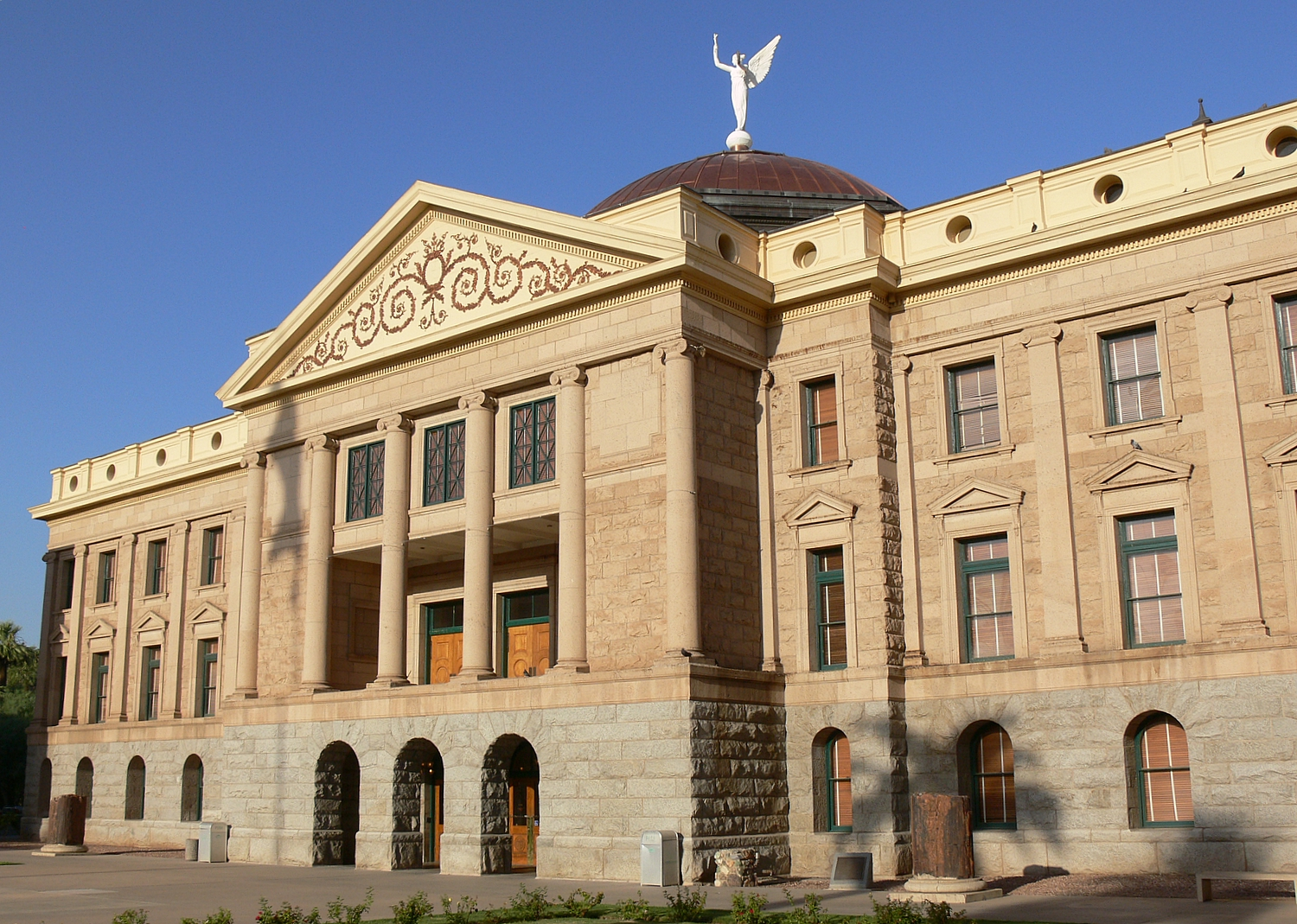
Capitol building of the Arizona Territory, built in 1901

- Abert's squirrel
- Acacia greggii
- Aerospace Maintenance and Regeneration Center
- Africanized bee
- Agave deserti
- All-American Canal
- American Old West
- Anasazi
- Araucarioxylon arizonicum
- Arcosanti
- Area codes in Arizona
- Arizona
- Arizona bark scorpion
- Arizona Borderlands
- Arizona Cactus Botanical Garden
- Arizona Canal
- Arizona Cardinals
- Arizona desert centipede
- Arizona Conservatory for Arts and Academics
- Arizona cypress
- Arizona Department of Corrections, Rehabilitation & Reentry
- Arizona Department of Economic Security
- Arizona Department of Health Services
- Arizona Department of Homeland Security
- Arizona Department of Gaming
- Arizona Department of Public Safety
- Arizona Department of Liquor Licenses and Control
- Arizona Department of Transportation
- Arizona Diamondbacks
- Arizona firecracker
- Arizona Game and Fish Department
- Arizona Health Care Cost Containment System
- Arizona Highways (magazine)
- Arizona League Mexico
- Arizona Medical Training Institute
- Arizona Native Plant Society
- Arizona Rattlers
- Arizona Saves
- Arizona State Capitol
- Arizona State Parks
- Arizona State Route 66
- Arizona State University
  - ASU School of Sustainability
- Arizona Sting
- Arizona Strip
- Arizona Territory
- Arizona Veterans Memorial Coliseum
- Arizona Western College
- Arizona woodpecker
- Arizonasaurus
- Arizona-Sonora Desert Museum
- Aspen Fire
- Art museums and galleries in Arizona
  - commons:Category:Art museums and galleries in Arizona
- Astronomical observatories in Arizona
  - commons:Category:Astronomical observatories in Arizona
- AZ – United States Postal Service postal code for the state of Arizona

== B ==
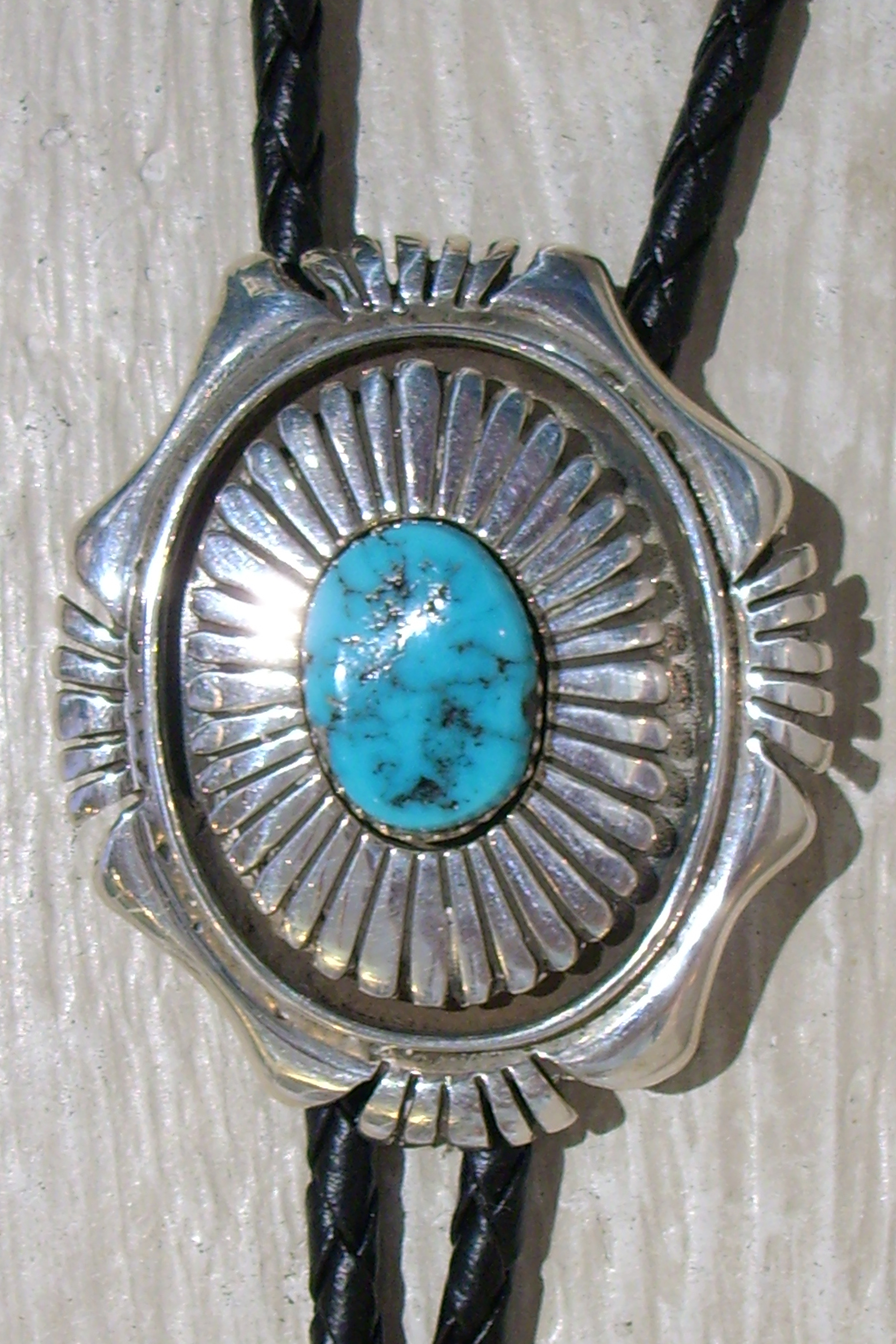
Arizona's official state neckwear: the Bolo (or bola) tie

- Barringer Crater
- Battle of Apache Pass
- Beaver Dam Mountains Wilderness
- Black Canyon of the Colorado
- Blythe Intaglios
- Bola tie
- Botanical gardens in Arizona
  - commons:Category:Botanical gardens in Arizona
- Boyce Thompson Arboretum State Park
- Bright Angel Trail
- Buildings and structures in Arizona
  - commons:Category:Buildings and structures in Arizona

== C ==
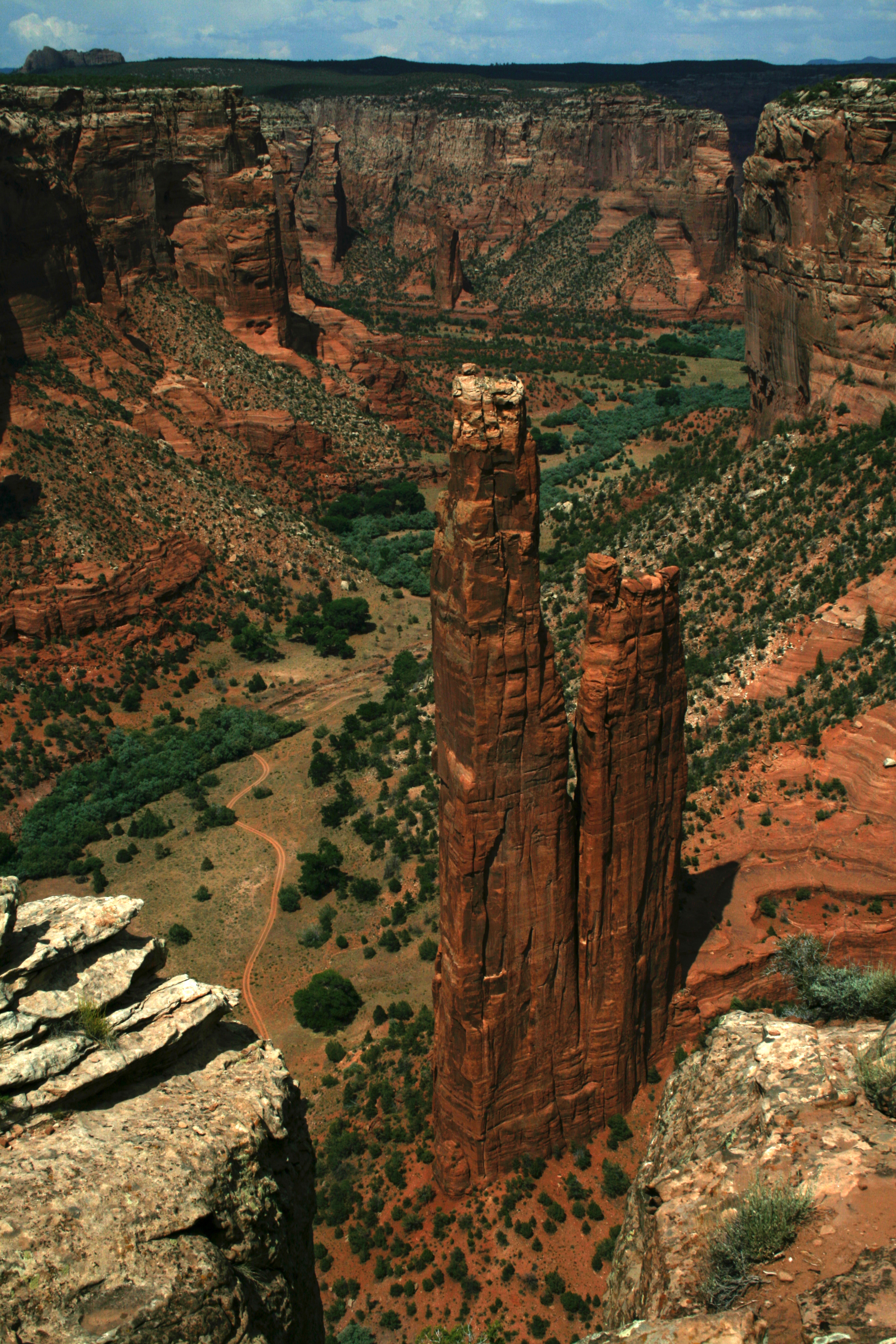
Spider Rock at Canyon de Chelly

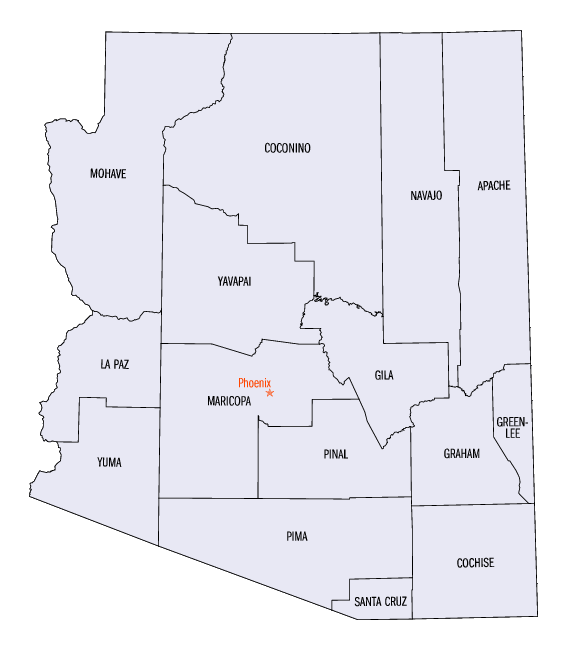
An enlargeable map of the 15 counties of the state of Arizona

- Cabeza Prieta National Wildlife Refuge
- Camelback Mountain
- Canada del Oro
- Canyon de Chelly National Monument
- Canyons and gorges of Arizona
  - commons:Category:Canyons and gorges of Arizona
- Capital of the state of Arizona
- Capitol of the state of Arizona
  - commons:Category:Arizona State Capitol
- Casa Grande Ruins National Monument
- Casinos in Arizona
- Catalina Highway
- Caves of Arizona
  - commons:Category:Caves of Arizona
- Cemeteries in Arizona
- Census statistical areas in Arizona
- Central Arizona Museum Association
- Central Arizona Project Aqueduct
- Climate of Arizona
- Climate change in Arizona
- Coconino Plateau
- Collared peccary
- Colorado Desert
- Colorado pinyon
- Colorado Plateau
- Colorado River
  - Colorado River Compact
  - Colorado River Delta
- Communications in Arizona
  - commons:Category:Communications in Arizona
- Confederate Territory of Arizona, 1862–1865
- Convention centers in Arizona
  - commons:Category:Convention centers in Arizona
- Copper extraction
- Copper mining in Arizona
- Coronado National Memorial
- Counties of the state of Arizona
  - commons:Category:Counties in Arizona
- Cross Rail Ranch
- Cuisine of Arizona
- Culture of Arizona
  - Category:Culture of Arizona
    - commons:Category:Arizona culture
- Cupressus arizonica (Arizona cypress)
- Curve-billed thrasher

== D ==
- Dasylirion wheeleri

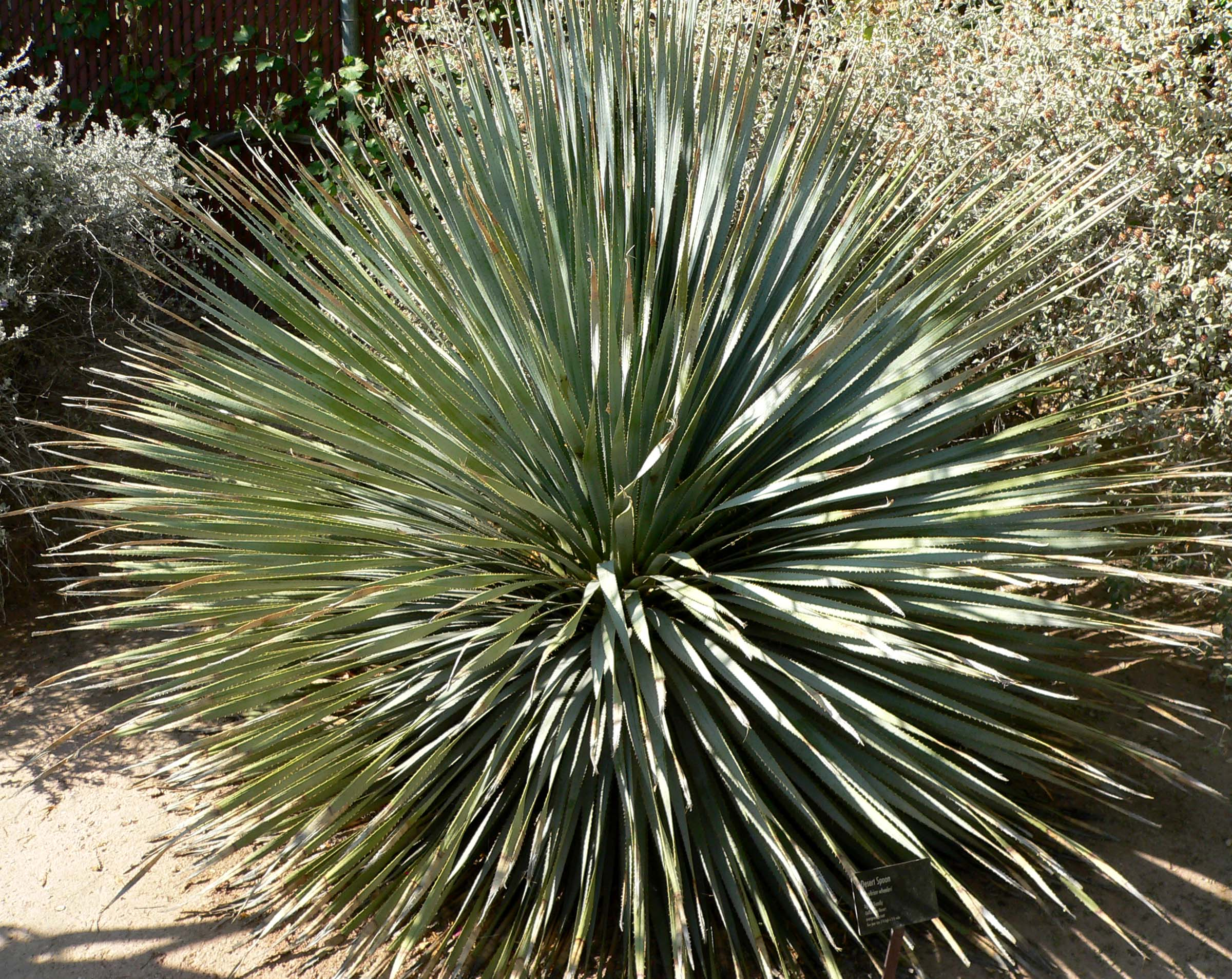
Dasylirion wheeleri, the desert spoon or sotol

- Davis-Monthan Air Force Base
- Aerospace Maintenance and Regeneration Center
- Deck Park Tunnel
- Demographics of Arizona
- Desert bighorn sheep
- Desert iguana
- Desert tortoise
- Desertification
- Deserts and xeric shrublands
- Dendrochronology
- Deserts:
  - Colorado Desert
  - Lechuguilla Desert
  - North American Desert
  - Painted Desert, Arizona
  - Sonoran Desert
  - Tule Desert (Arizona)
  - Yuma Desert
- Dry Lake Wind Power Project

== E ==
- Economy of Arizona
  - Category:Economy of Arizona
    - commons:Category:Economy of Arizona
- Education in Arizona
  - Category:Education in Arizona
    - commons:Category:Education in Arizona
- Elections in the state of Arizona
  - commons:Category:Elections in Arizona
- Entrenched river
- Environment of Arizona
  - commons:Category:Environment of Arizona

== F ==
The Flag of the State of Arizona

- Festivals in Arizona
  - commons:Category:Festivals in Arizona
- Flag of the State of Arizona
- Forts of Arizona
  - Fort Whipple, first capital of Arizona territory 1864
  - Category:Forts in Arizona
    - commons:Category:Forts in Arizona
- Four Corners
  - Four Corners Monument
- Four Peaks
- Frye Mesa Reservoir

== G ==
The Great Seal of the State of Arizona

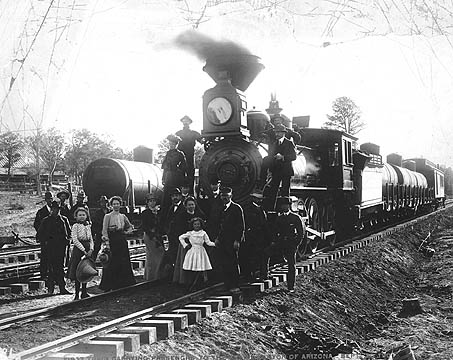
First run of the Grand Canyon Railway, 1901

- Gadsden Purchase of 1853
- Geography of Arizona
  - Category:Geography of Arizona
    - commons:Category:Geography of Arizona
- Geology of Arizona
  - Geology of the Grand Canyon area
  - commons:Category:Geology of Arizona
- Get Back
- Ghost towns in Arizona
  - Category:Ghost towns in Arizona
    - commons:Category:Ghost towns in Arizona
- Gila monster
- Gila River
- Gila trout
- Gila woodpecker
- Glen Canyon
- Glen Canyon Dam
- Gold cyanidation
- Golf clubs and courses in Arizona
- Government of the state of Arizona website
  - Category:Government of Arizona
    - commons:Category:Government of Arizona
- Governor of the State of Arizona
  - List of governors of Arizona
- Grand Canyon
- Grand Canyon Railway
- Grand Canyon–Parashant National Monument
- Great Seal of the State of Arizona
- Great Unconformity
- Gulf of California (Sea of Cortez)

== H ==
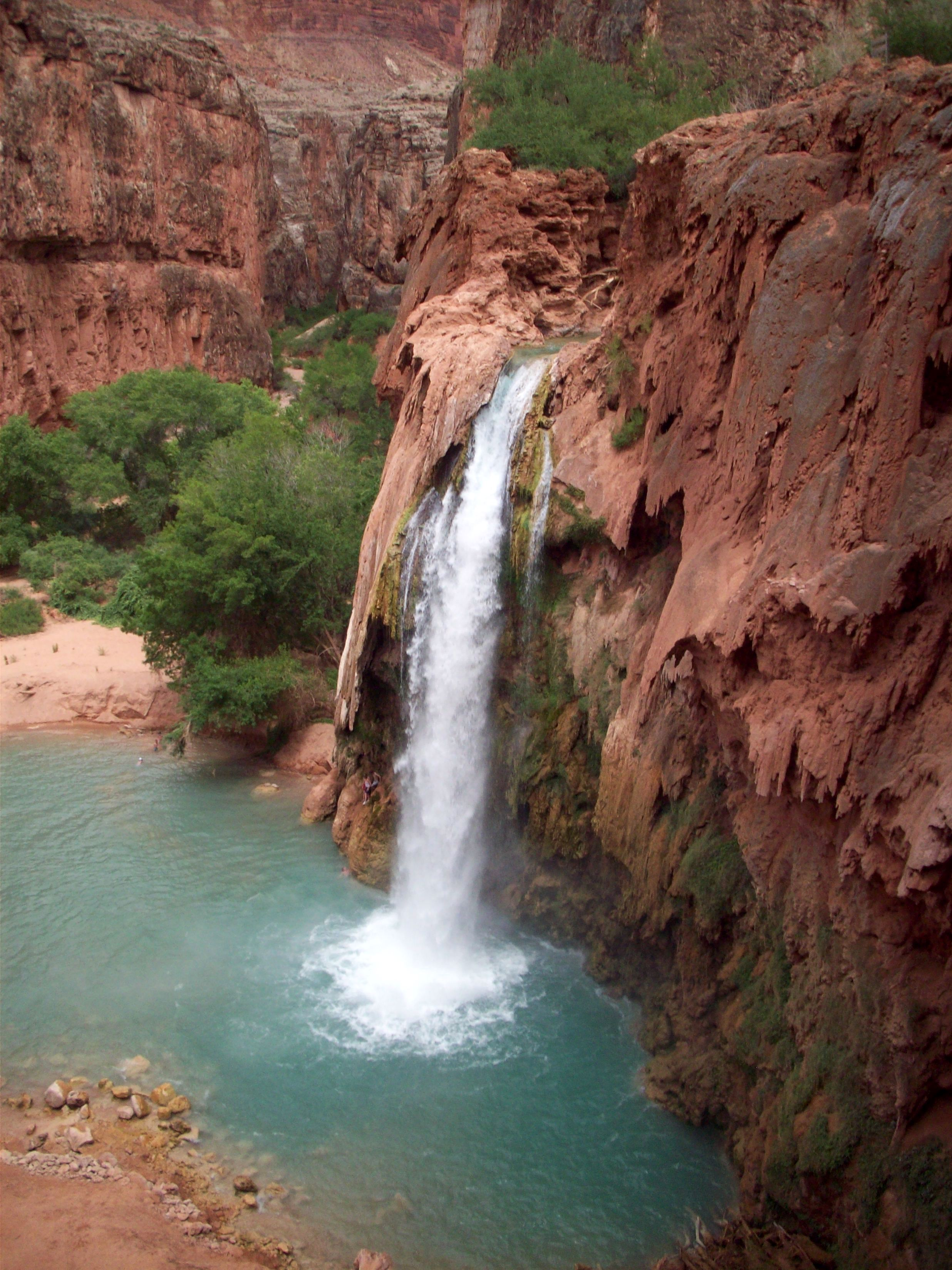
Havasu Falls

- Haboob
- Havasu Falls
- Heritage railroads in Arizona
  - commons:Category:Heritage railroads in Arizona
- Hiking trails in Arizona
  - commons:Category:Hiking trails in Arizona
- History of Arizona
  - Historical outline of Arizona
    - Category:History of Arizona
      - commons:Category:History of Arizona
- History of Phoenix, Arizona
- Hoover Dam
- Hoover Dam Bypass
- Hot springs of Arizona
  - commons:Category:Hot springs of Arizona
- Hotel San Carlos
- Humphreys Peak

== I ==
- Images of Arizona
  - commons:Category:Arizona
- Indigenous peoples in Arizona
- Ipomopsis arizonica (Arizona firecracker)
- Islands in Arizona

== J ==
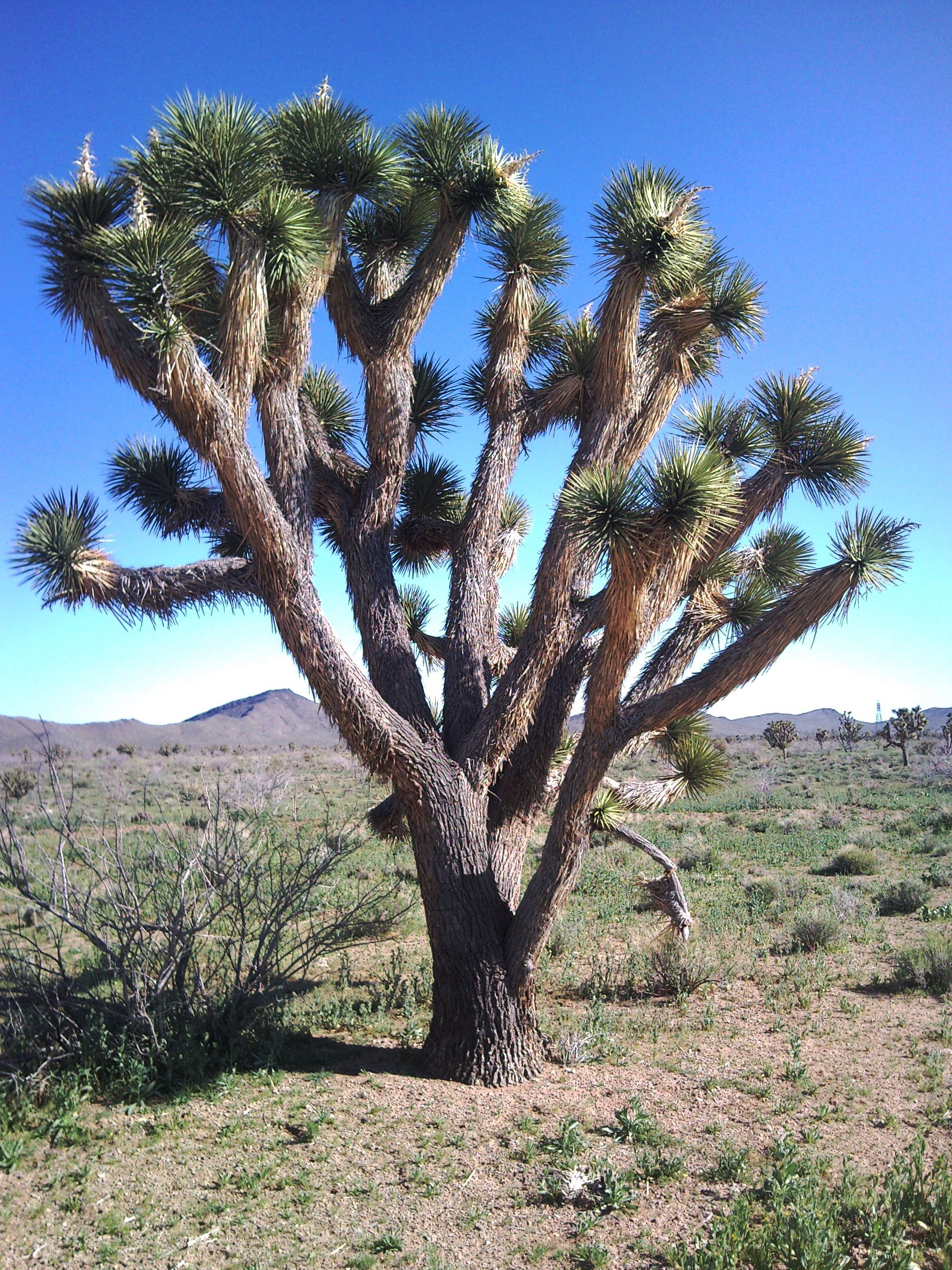
Joshua tree in Arizona

- James Reavis, The 'Baron of Arizona'
- Jojoba
- Joshua tree
- Jumping Cholla

== K ==
- Kaibab Plateau
- Kaibab squirrel
- Kitt Peak National Observatory

== L ==
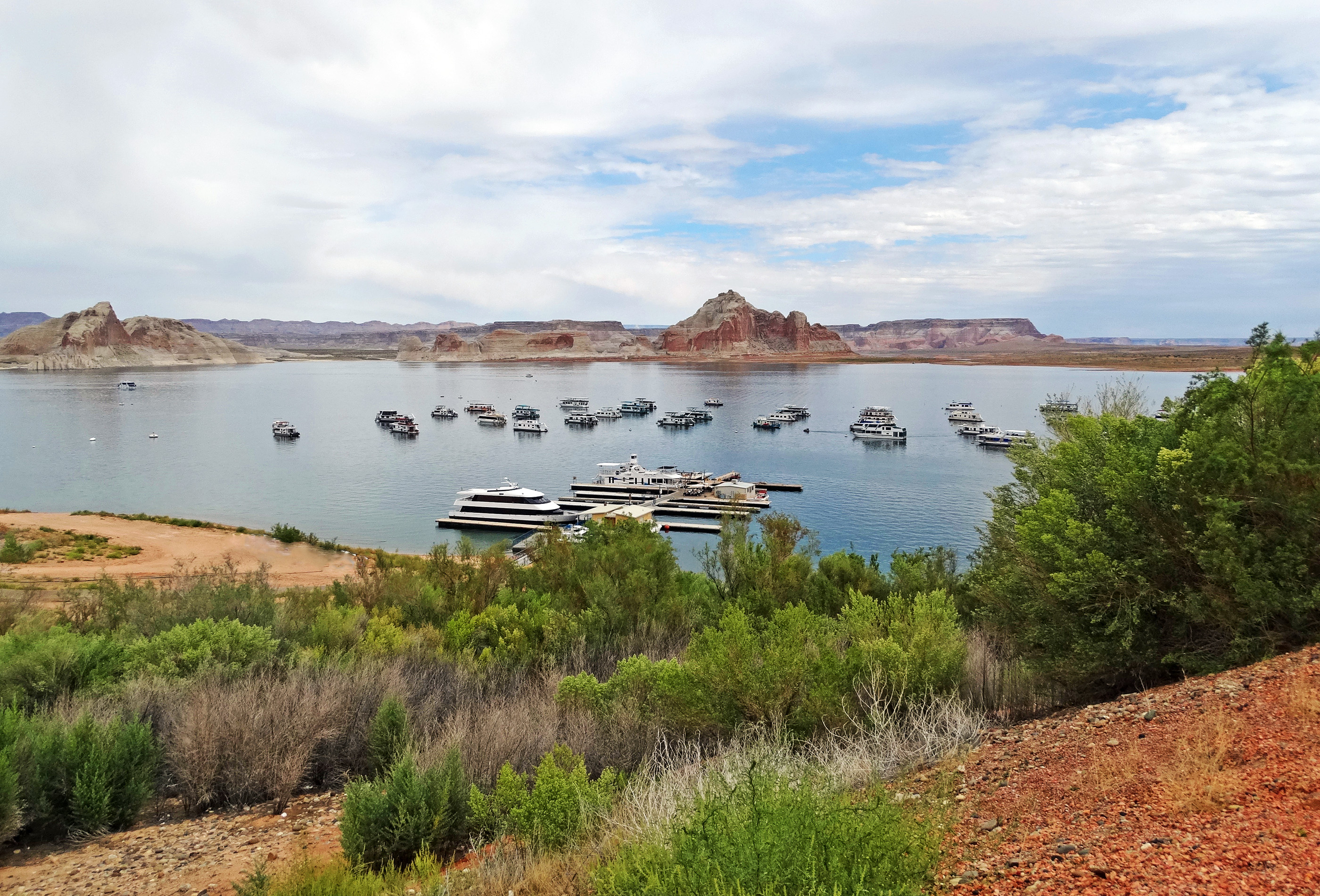
Lake Powell

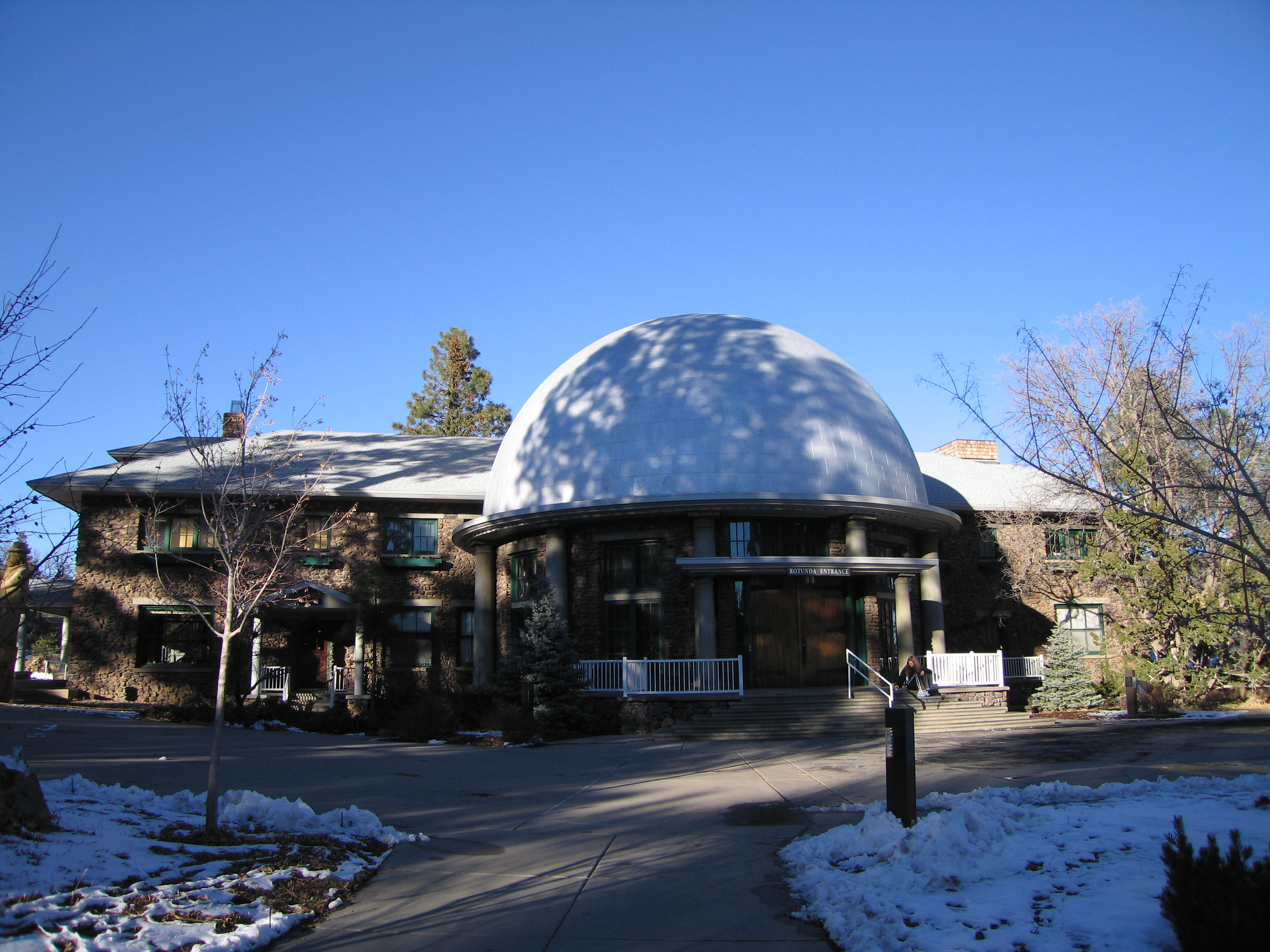
Lowell Observatory, Flagstaff

- Lakes in Arizona
  - Lake Mead
  - Lake Powell
- Lechuguilla Desert
- Lee's Ferry
- Lists related to the state of Arizona:
  - List of airports in Arizona
  - List of birds in Arizona
  - List of cemeteries in Arizona
  - List of census statistical areas in Arizona
  - List of cities in Arizona
  - List of colleges and universities in Arizona
  - List of Colorado River rapids and features
  - List of companies in Arizona
  - List of counties in Arizona
  - List of county name etymologies in Arizona
  - List of county seats in Arizona
  - List of dams and reservoirs in Arizona
  - List of ghost towns in Arizona
  - List of governors of Arizona
  - List of high schools in Arizona
  - List of highway routes in Arizona
  - List of hospitals in Arizona
  - List of hurricanes in Arizona
  - List of individuals executed in Arizona
  - List of islands in Arizona
  - List of lakes in Arizona
  - List of lava flows in Arizona
  - List of law enforcement agencies in Arizona
  - List of localities in Arizona
  - List of mountain ranges of Arizona
  - List of mountains and hills of Arizona by height
  - List of museums in Arizona
  - List of National Historic Landmarks in Arizona
  - List of newspapers in Arizona
  - List of North American deserts
  - List of people from Arizona
  - List of people from Tucson
  - List of places in Arizona
  - List of power stations in Arizona
  - List of private and independent schools in Arizona
  - List of radio stations in Arizona
  - List of railroads in Arizona
  - List of Registered Historic Places in Arizona
  - List of Registered Historic Places in Coconino County, Arizona
  - List of rivers of Arizona
  - List of school districts in Arizona
  - List of Sonoran Desert birds (Arizona)
  - List of state parks in Arizona
  - List of state prisons in Arizona
  - List of symbols of the State of Arizona
  - List of telephone area codes in Arizona
  - List of television stations in Arizona
  - List of towns in Arizona
  - List of Arizona's congressional delegations
  - List of United States congressional districts in Arizona
  - List of United States representatives from Arizona
  - List of United States senators from Arizona
  - List of valleys of Arizona
  - List of wilderness areas in Arizona
  - List of wilderness areas in the Lower Colorado River Valley of Arizona
- Little Colorado River
- London Bridge
- Lost Dutchman's Gold Mine
- Lowell Observatory

== M ==
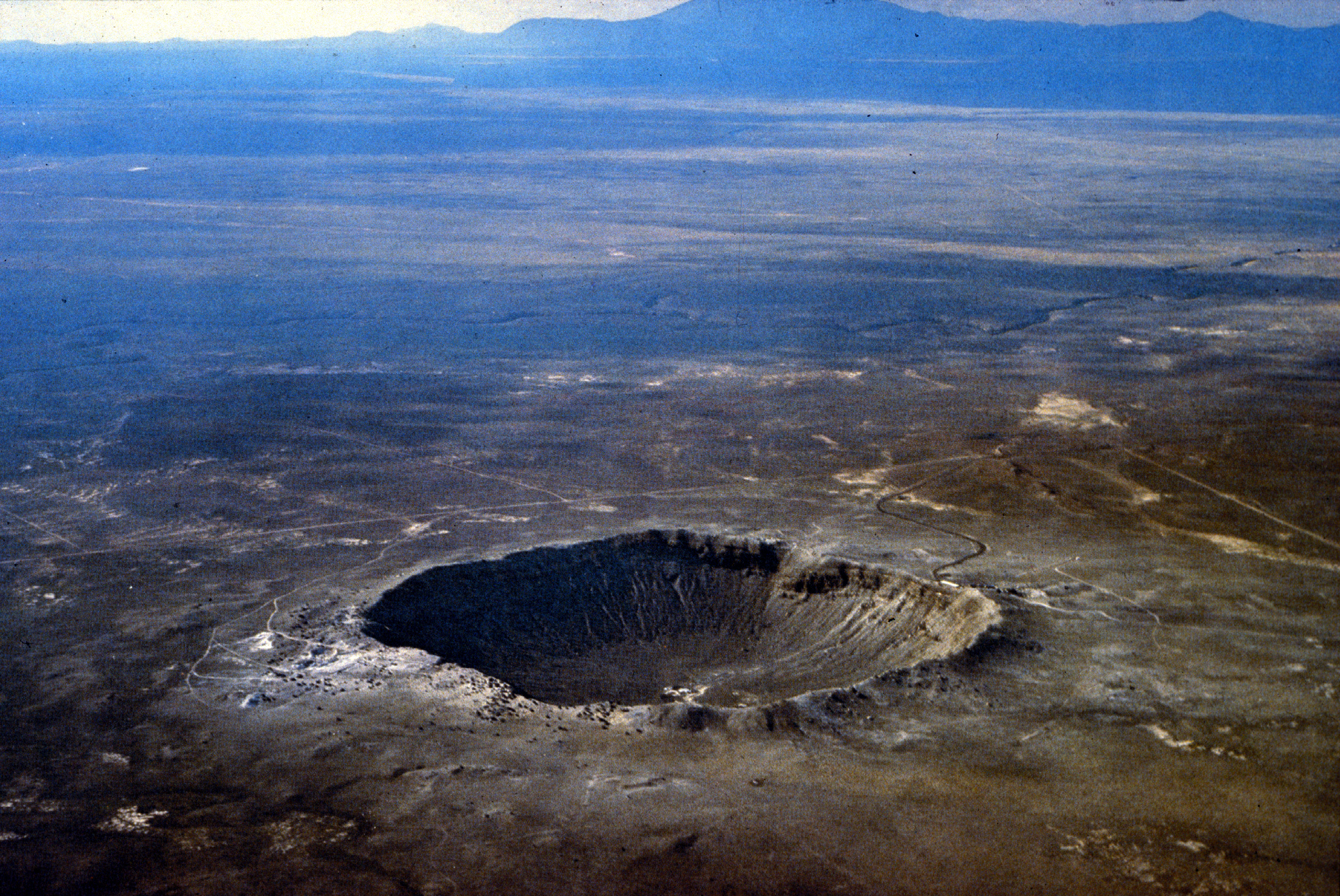
Meteor Crater

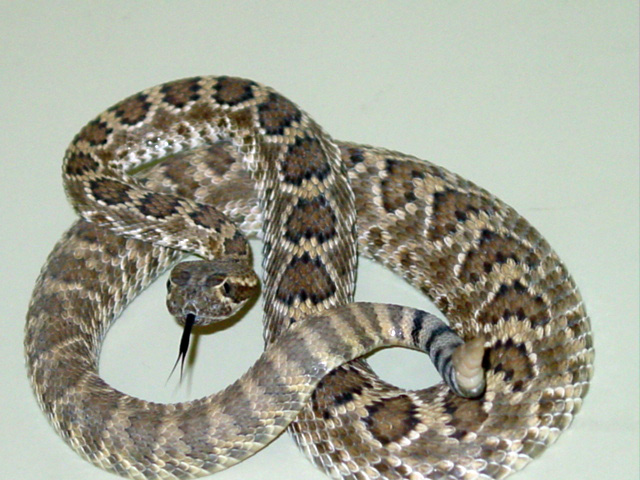
Mohave rattlesnake

- Madera Canyon (Arizona)
- Madrean Sky Islands
- Maps of Arizona
  - commons:Category:Maps of Arizona
- Marble Canyon
- McKale Center
- Meteor Crater
- Mexican period of Arizona, 1821–1848
- Mike O'Callaghan – Pat Tillman Memorial Bridge
- Mirrorshades Project
- Mission San Xavier del Bac
- Mogollon
- Mogollon Monster
- Mogollon Plateau
- Mogollon Rim
- Mojave rattlesnake
- Monument Valley
- Monuments and memorials in Arizona
  - commons:Category:Monuments and memorials in Arizona
- Mormon volcanic field
- Mountains of Arizona
  - Mount Graham
  - Mount Lemmon
  - commons:Category:Mountains of Arizona
- Museums in Arizona
  - Category:Museums in Arizona
    - commons:Category:Museums in Arizona
- Music of Arizona
  - Category:Music of Arizona
    - commons:Category:Music of Arizona
  - Category:Musical groups from Arizona
  - Category:Musicians from Arizona
- Mystery Castle

== N ==
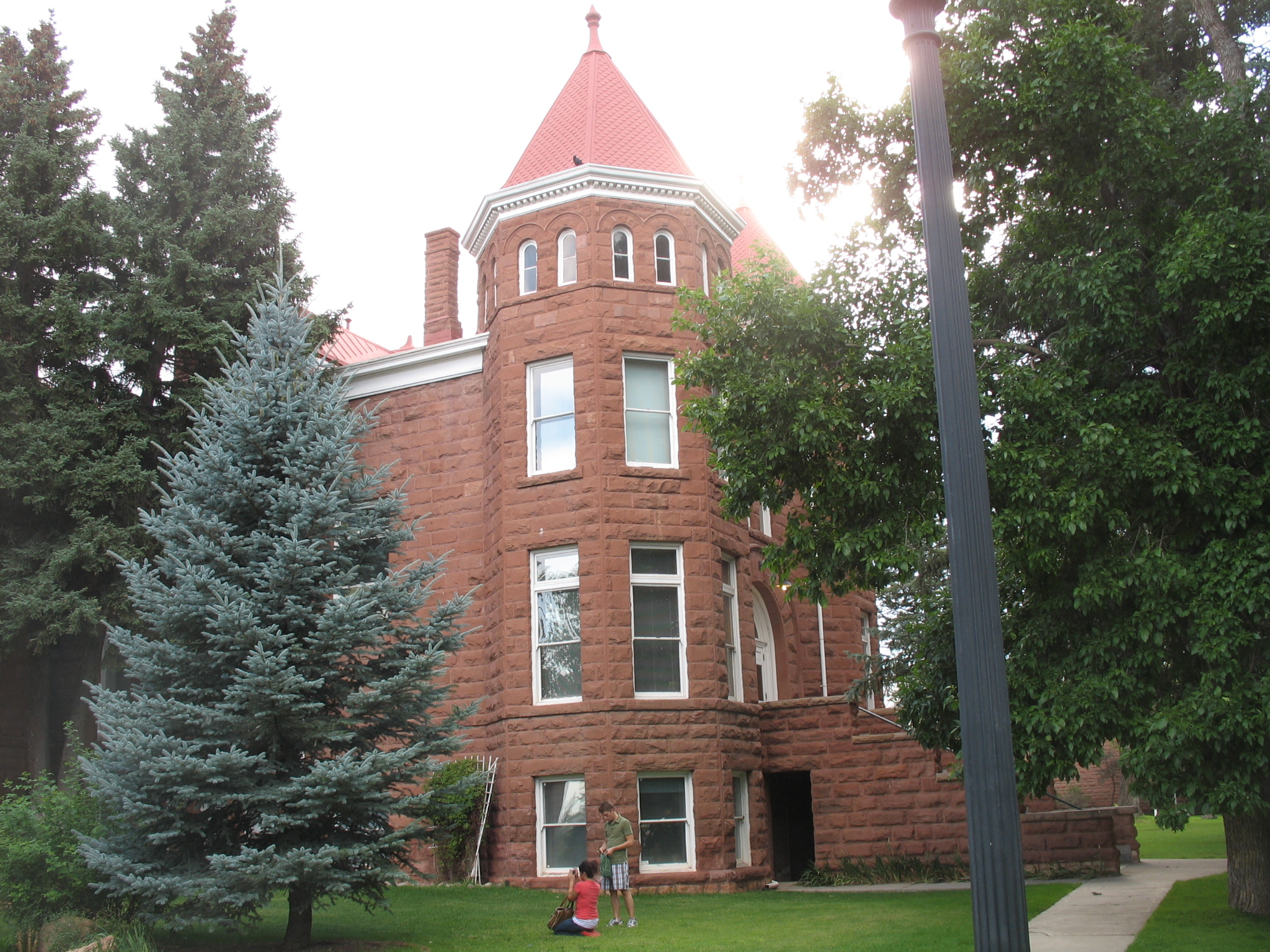
Old Main at NAU

- National forests of Arizona
  - commons:Category:National Forests of Arizona
- National monuments in Arizona
  - commons:Category:National Monuments in Arizona
- National Parks in Arizona
  - commons:Category:National Parks in Arizona
- National Radio Astronomy Observatory
- Native Americans in Arizona
- Natural arches of Arizona
  - commons:Category:Natural arches of Arizona
- Natural gas pipelines in Arizona
- Natural history of Arizona
  - commons:Category:Natural history of Arizona
- Navajo Bridge
- Navajo Nation (Native American)
- North American Desert
- Northern Arizona University

== O ==
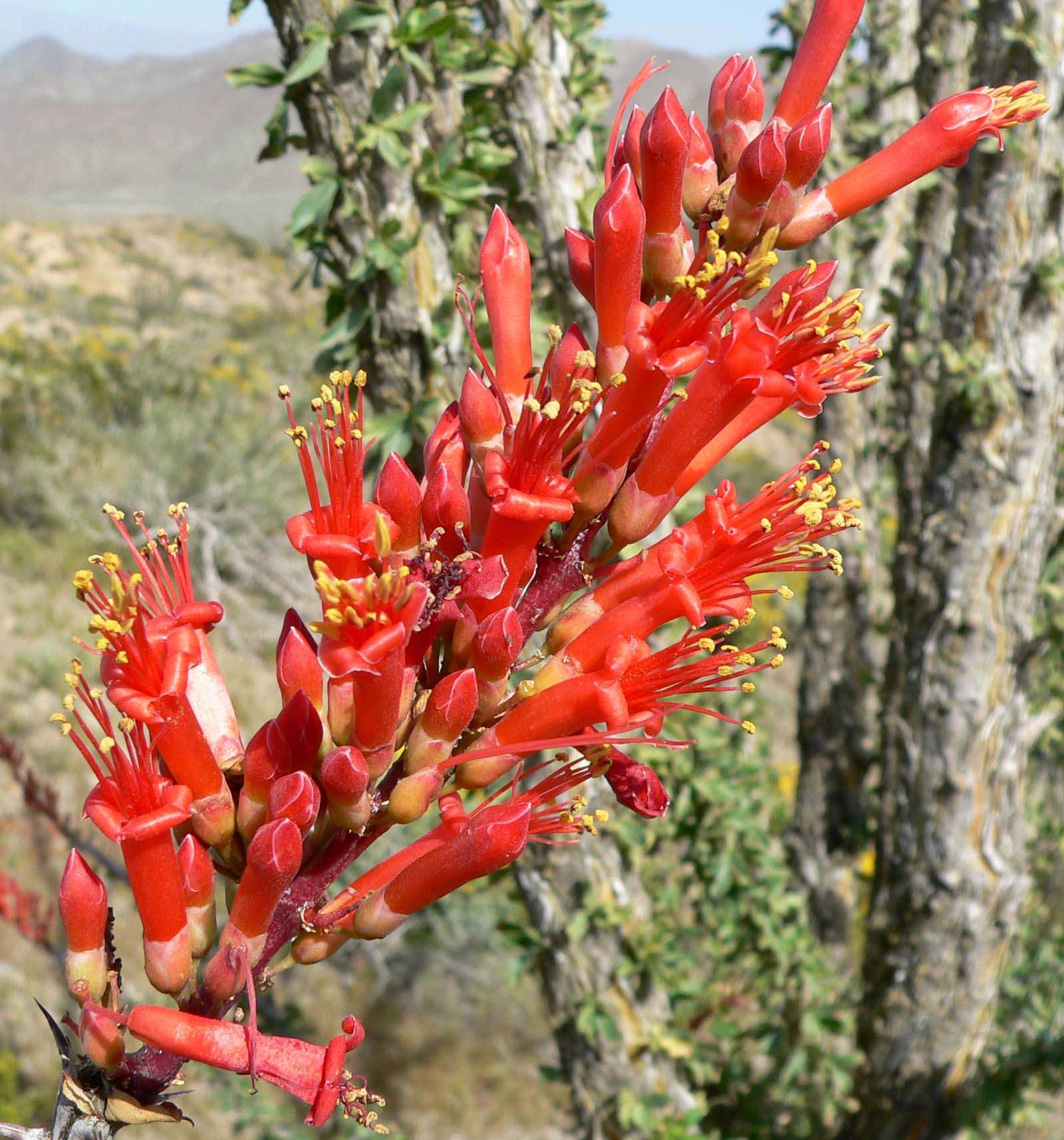
Ocotillo in bloom

- Ocotillo
- Old Plank Road
- O'odham

== P ==
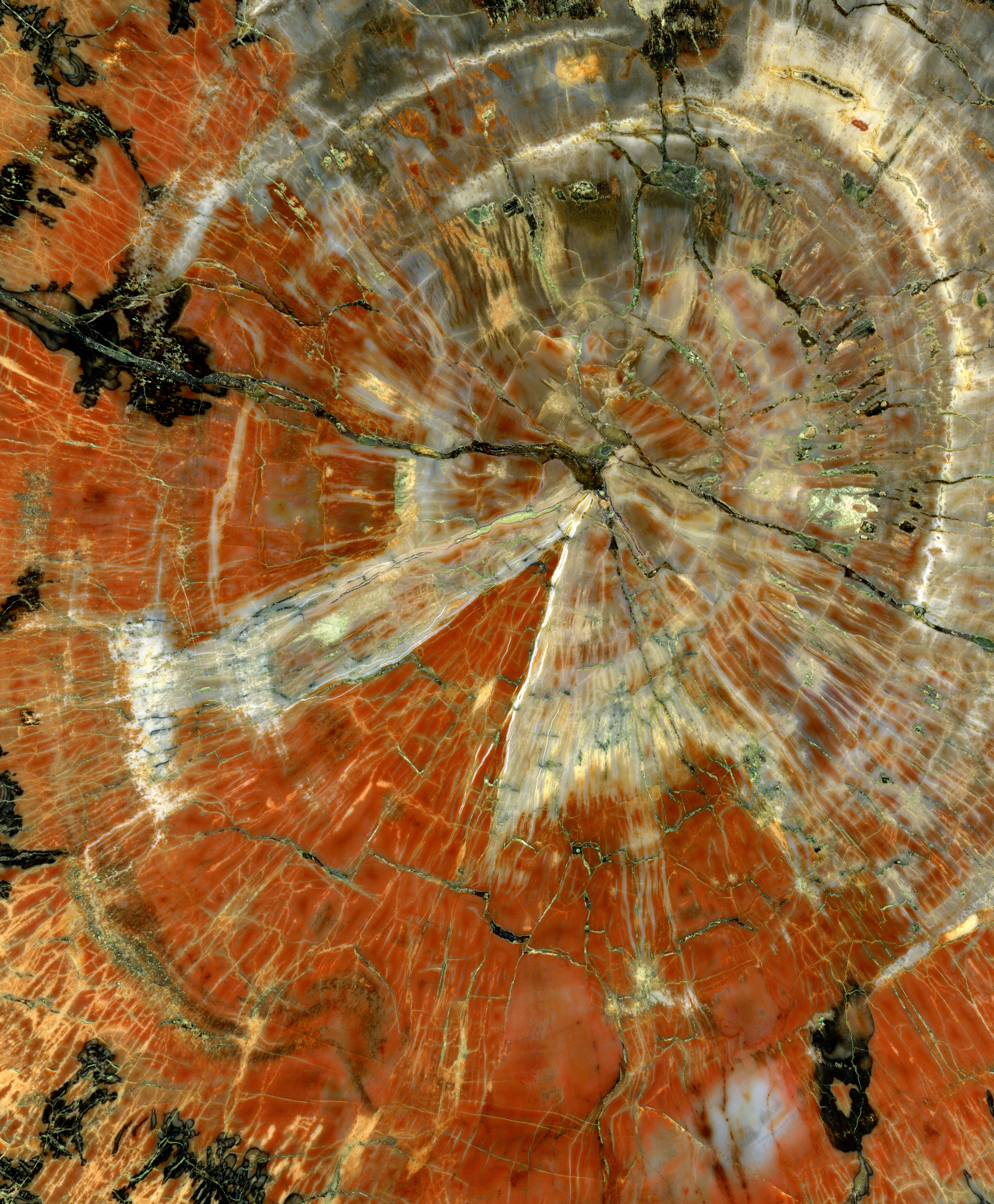
Petrified wood from Arizona

- Painted lady (butterfly)
- Palo verde, State tree
- Paria Canyon-Vermilion Cliffs Wilderness
- Patayan
- People from Arizona
  - Category:People from Arizona
    - commons:Category:People from Arizona
    - Category:People from Arizona by populated place
    - Category:People from Arizona by county
    - Category:People from Arizona by occupation
- Petrified wood
- Phantom Ranch
- Phoenix, Arizona, territorial and state capital since 1889
- Phoenix (mythology)
- Phoenix Coyotes
- Phoenix Eclipse
- Phoenix Mercury
- Phoenix Municipal Stadium
- Phoenix Sky Harbor International Airport
- Phoenix Suns
- Phoenix Zoo
- Piestewa Peak
- Politics of Arizona
  - commons:Category:Politics of Arizona
- Prescott, Arizona, territorial capital 1864–1867 and 1877–1889
- Prickly pear cactus
- Protected areas of Arizona
  - commons:Category:Protected areas of Arizona

== Q ==
- Ben Quayle
- Dan Quayle

== R ==
- Railroad museums in Arizona
  - commons:Category:Railroad museums in Arizona
- Rattlesnake
- Red Butte
- Religion in Arizona
  - Category:Religion in Arizona
    - commons:Category:Religion in Arizona
- Repatriation flight program
- Rock formations in Arizona
  - commons:Category:Rock formations in Arizona

== S ==
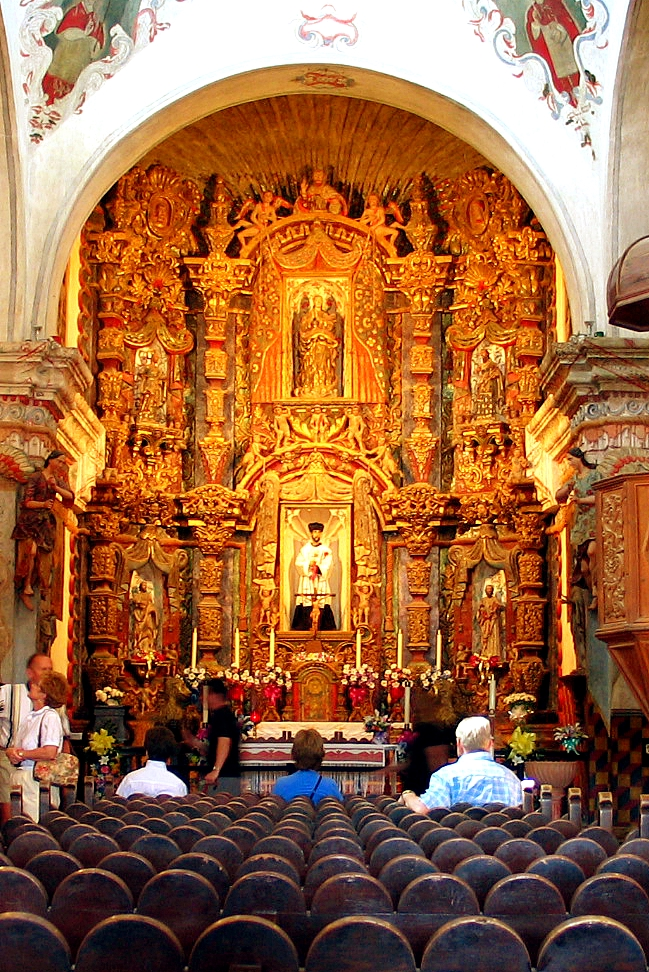
Restored altar and interior of Mission San Xavier del Bac

- Saguaro
- Saguaro National Park
- Salt River Project
- San Francisco Peaks
- San Francisco volcanic field
- San Xavier del Bac Mission
- Scouting in Arizona
- Sea of Cortez (Gulf of California)
- Settlements in Arizona
  - Cities in Arizona
  - Towns in Arizona
  - Census Designated Places in Arizona
  - Other unincorporated communities in Arizona
  - List of ghost towns in Arizona
  - List of places in Arizona
- Shannon's law (Arizona)
- Sierra Madre Occidental pine-oak forests
- Silver mining in Arizona
- Sinagua
- Ski areas and resorts in Arizona
  - commons:Category:Ski areas and resorts in Arizona
- Snaketown
- Soaptree yucca
- Solar power in Arizona
- Sonoran Desert
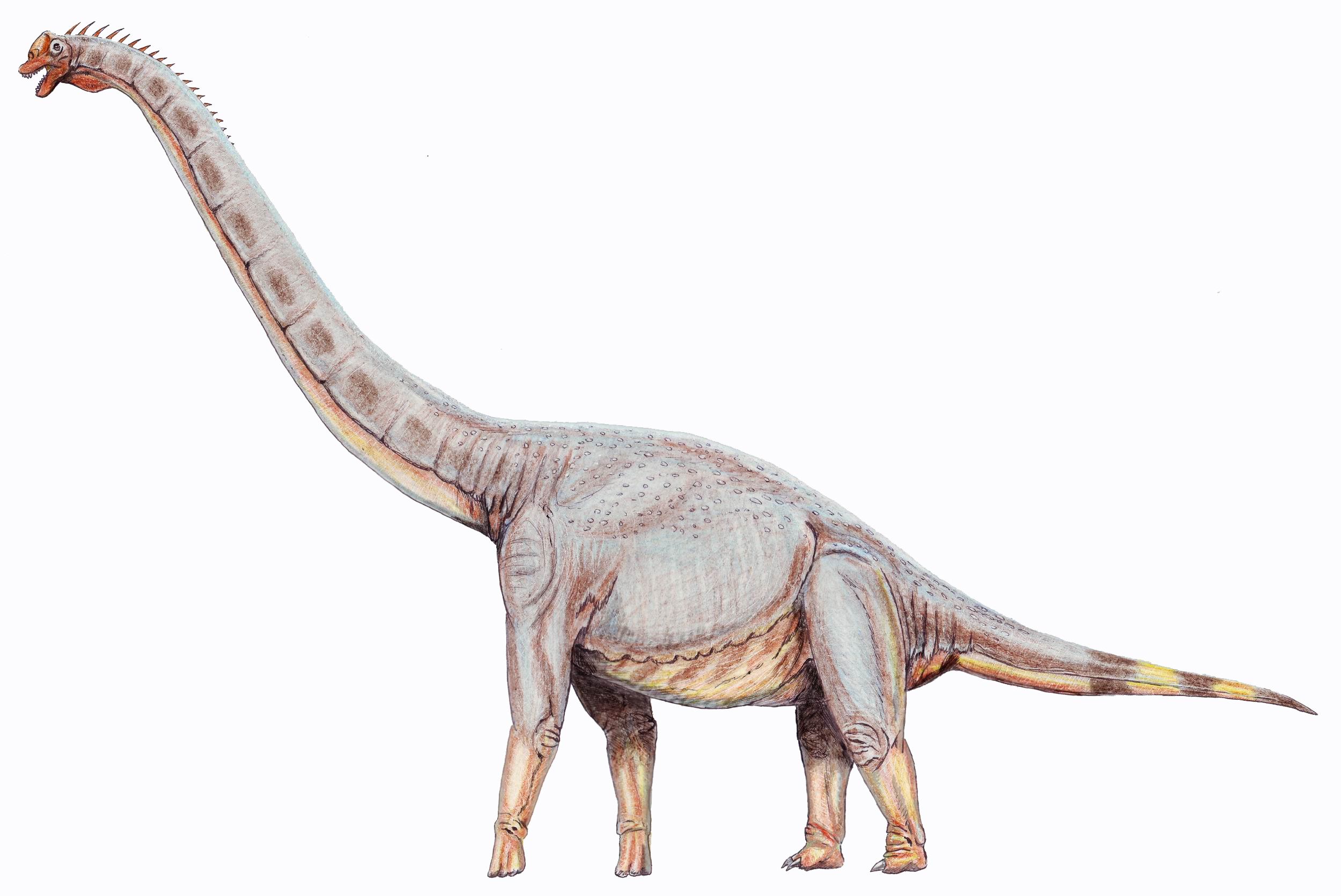
  Sonorasaurus
- Sonorasaurus
- Southwest Extreme Triangle
- Southwestern United States
- Spanish missions in the Sonoran Desert
  - Spanish missions in Arizona
- Spanish period of Arizona, 1687–1821
- Sports in Arizona
  - commons:Category:Sports in Arizona
- Sports venues in Arizona
  - commons:Category:Sports venues in Arizona
- State of Arizona website
  - Government of the state of Arizona
    - Category:Government of Arizona
      - commons:Category:Government of Arizona
- Structures in Arizona
  - commons:Category:Buildings and structures in Arizona
- Sun Devil Stadium
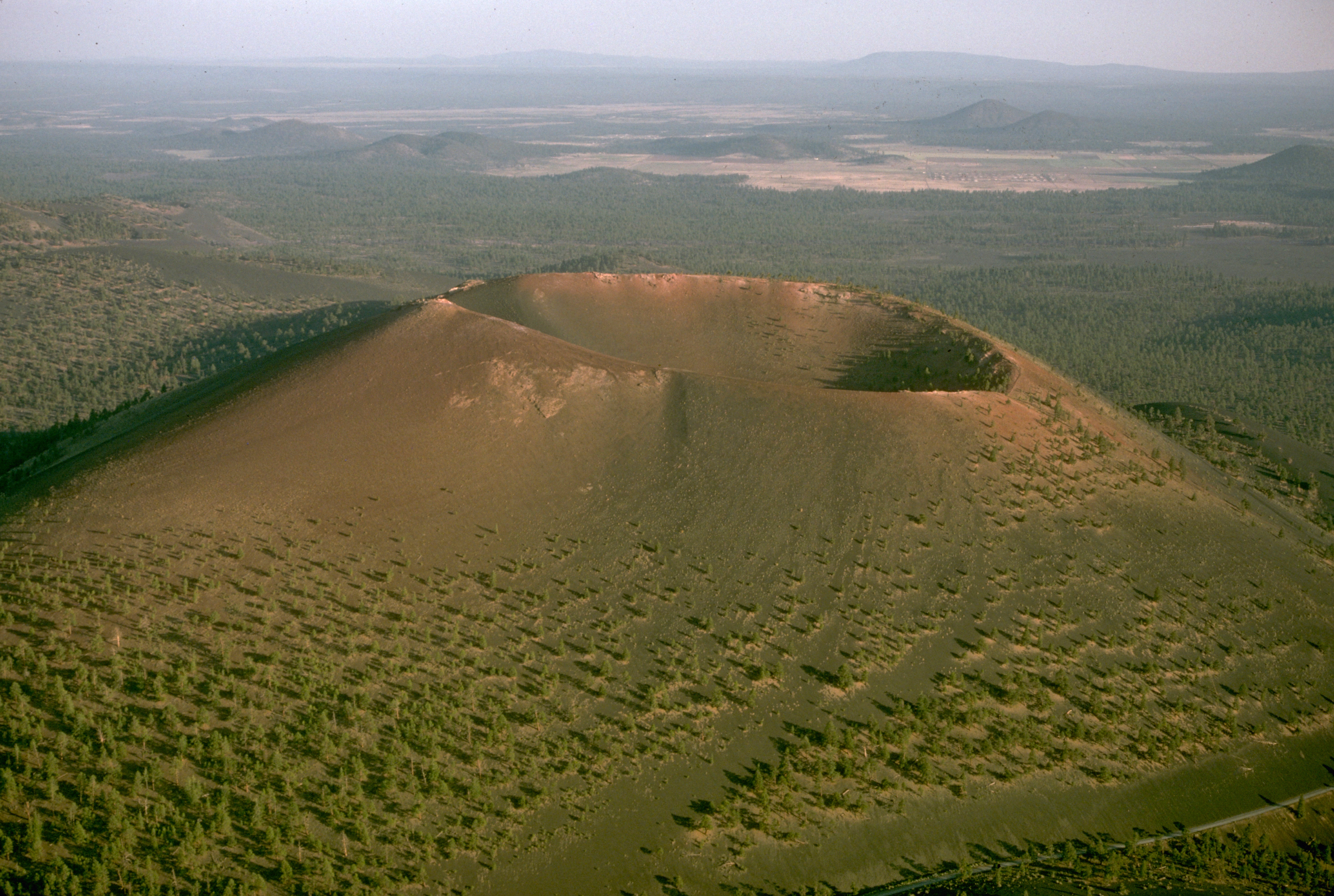
  Birds-eye view of Sunset Crater
- Sunset Crater
- Super Bowl XXVII
- Superfund sites in Arizona
- Symbols of the State of Arizona
  - Arizona state amphibian: Arizona treefrog (Hyla eximia)
  - Arizona state bird: cactus wren (Campylorhynchus brunneicapillus)
  - Arizona state butterfly: two-tailed swallowtail (Papilio multicaudata)
  - Arizona state colors: federal blue and old gold
  - Arizona state fish: Arizona trout (Oncorhynchus gilae apache)
  - Arizona state flag: Flag of the State of Arizona
  - Arizona state flower: saguaro blossom (Carnegiea gigantea)
  - Arizona state fossil: petrified wood
  - Arizona state gemstone: turquoise
  - Arizona state mammal: ringtail (Bassariscus astutus)
  - Arizona state motto: Ditat Deus (Latin for God enriches)
  - Arizona state neckwear: bolo tie
  - Arizona state nickname and slogan: Grand Canyon State
  - Arizona state reptile: Arizona ridge-nosed rattlesnake (Crotalus willardi)
  - Arizona state seal: Great Seal of the State of Arizona
  - Arizona state songs: Arizona March Song and Arizona
  - Arizona state tree: blue palo verde (Parkinsonia florida)
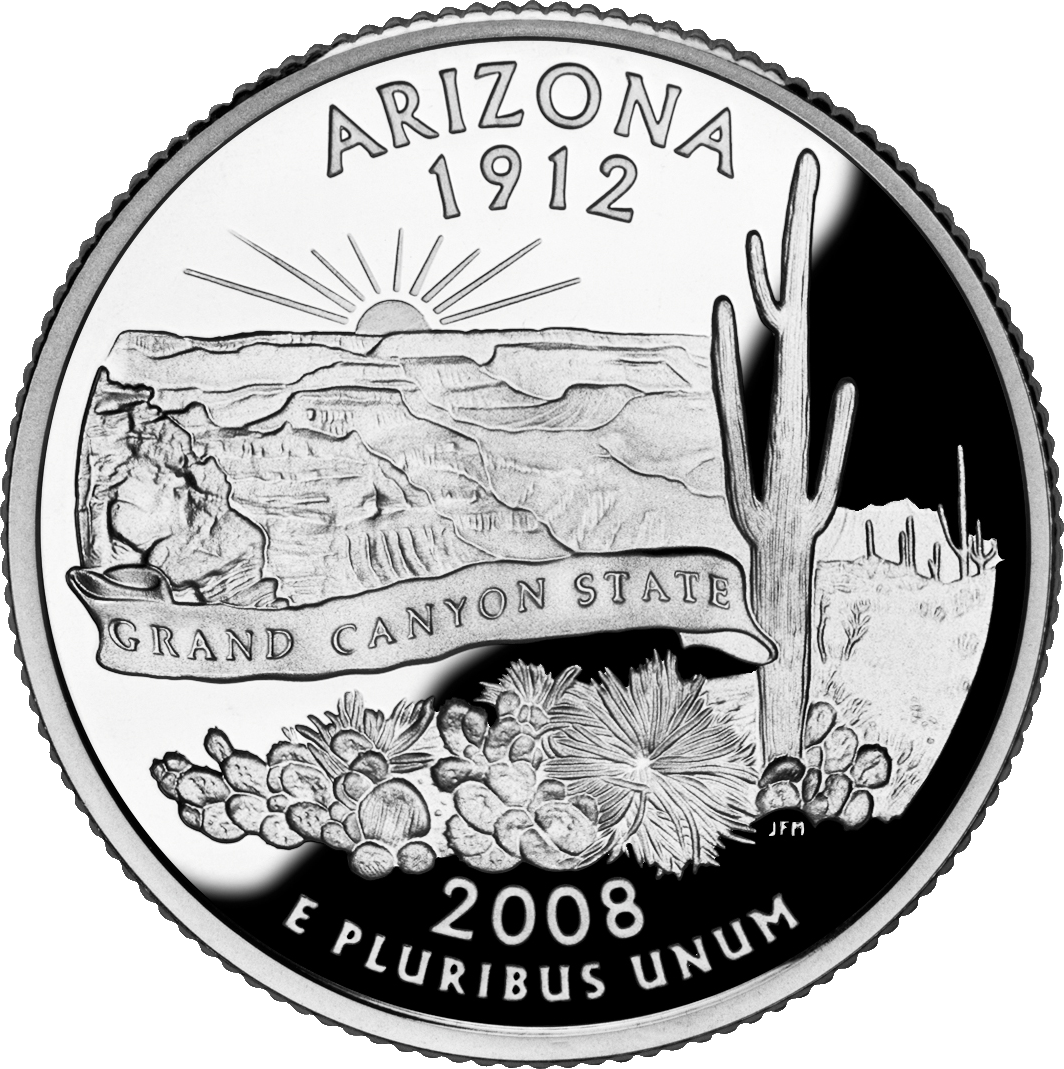
  - United States quarter dollar – Arizona 2008:

== T ==
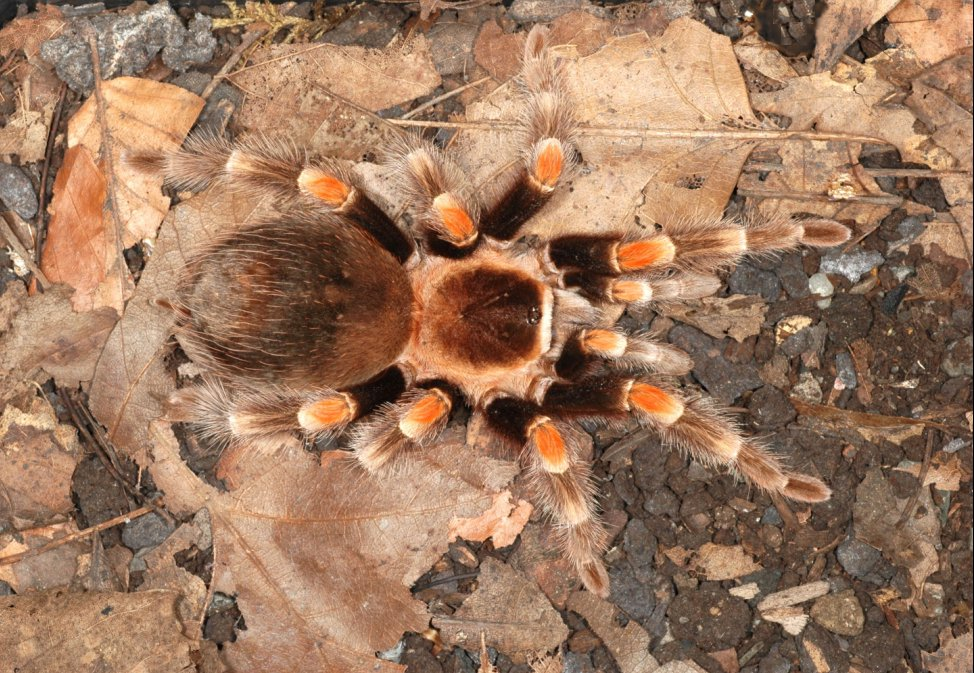
Mexican redknee tarantula

- Tarantula
- Telecommunications in Arizona
  - commons:Category:Communications in Arizona
- Telephone area codes in Arizona
- Territory of Arizona, 1863–1912
- Territory of Arizona (CSA), 1861–1865
- Territory of New Mexico, 1850–1863 & 1863–1912
- Texas Canyon
- Theatres in Arizona
  - commons:Category:Theatres in Arizona
- Titan Missile Museum
- Tohono O'odham, southern Arizona Nation
- Tourism in Arizona
  - commons:Category:Tourism in Arizona
- Transportation in Arizona
  - Category:Transportation in Arizona
    - commons:Category:Transport in Arizona
- Treaty of Guadalupe Hidalgo of 1848
- Tucson, Arizona, territorial capital 1867–1877
- Tucson Bird Count
- Tucson Gem & Mineral Show
- Tule Desert (Arizona)
- Turf Paradise

== U ==
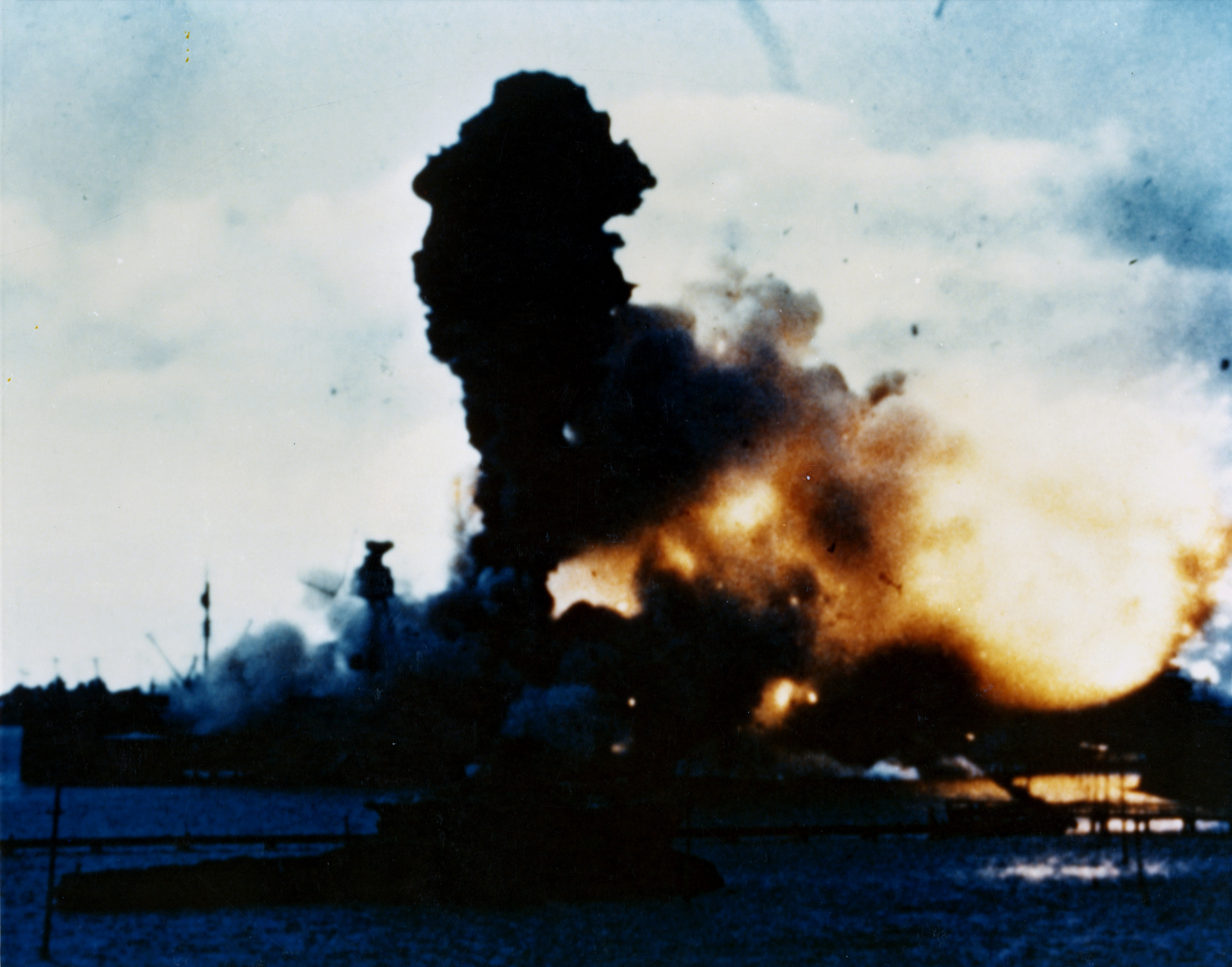
USS Arizona's forward magazines explode during the attack on Pearl Harbor, 1941. 1,177 people died in the sinking of the Arizona.

- UFO
- United States of America
  - States of the United States of America
  - United States census statistical areas of Arizona
  - Arizona's congressional delegations
  - United States congressional districts in Arizona
  - United States Court of Appeals for the Ninth Circuit
  - United States District Court for the District of Arizona
  - United States representatives from Arizona
  - United States senators from Arizona
- United States-Mexico border
- University of Arizona
- University of Arizona Mineral Museum
- University of Phoenix Stadium
- Uranium mining in Arizona
- U.S. Route 66
- US-AZ – ISO 3166-2:US region code for the state of Arizona
- USS Arizona (BB-39)
- USS Arizona Memorial

== V ==
- Verde Valley

== W ==
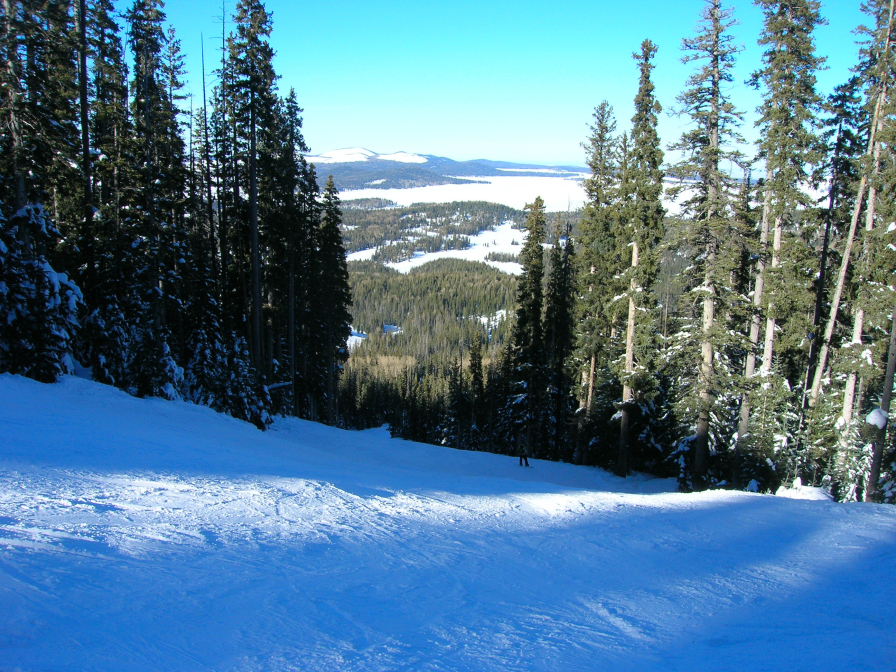
View from Sunrise Peak in Arizona's White Mountains

- Walnut Canyon National Monument
- Waterfalls in Arizona
  - commons:Category:Waterfalls in Arizona
- Western painted lady (butterfly)
- Western United States
- White Mountains (Arizona)
- ;Wikimedia
  - Wikimedia Commons:Category:Arizona
    - commons:Category:Maps of Arizona
  - n:Category:Arizona
    - n:Portal:Arizona
  - Wikipedia Category:Arizona
    - Wikipedia Portal:Arizona
    - Wikipedia:WikiProject Arizona
      - Category:WikiProject Arizona articles
      - Category:WikiProject Arizona participants
- Wind power in Arizona
- Windsor Hotel
- Wrather Arch

== X ==
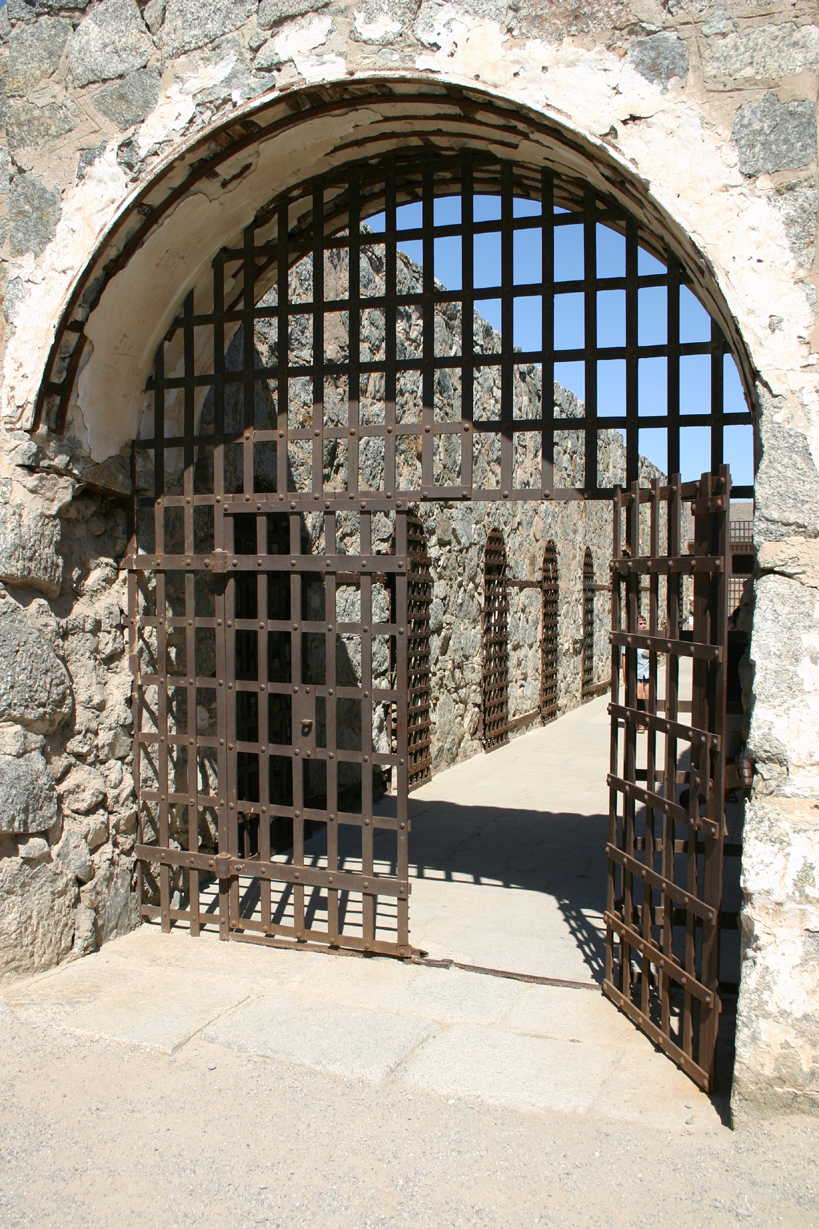
Main gate of the old Yuma Territorial Prison

- Xavier College Preparatory (Arizona)
- Xeric shrublands and deserts
- Xeriscaping

== Y ==
- Yaqui
- Yucca
- Yuma Desert
- Yuma Territorial Prison
- Yuman
- Yuman music

== Z ==
- Zoos in Arizona
  - commons:Category:Zoos in Arizona

== See also ==
- Topic overview:
  - Arizona
  - Outline of Arizona
