= Outline of Arizona =

U.S. state

The following outline is provided as an overview of and topical guide to the U.S. state of Arizona:

Arizona is a landlocked state in the Southwestern United States, sharing the Four Corners region with Colorado, New Mexico, and Utah. It also borders Nevada to the northwest and California to the west, and shares an international border with the Mexican states of Sonora and Baja California to the south and southwest. Its capital and largest city is Phoenix, which is the most populous state capital and fifth-most populous city in the United States. Arizona is divided into 15 counties.

== General reference ==
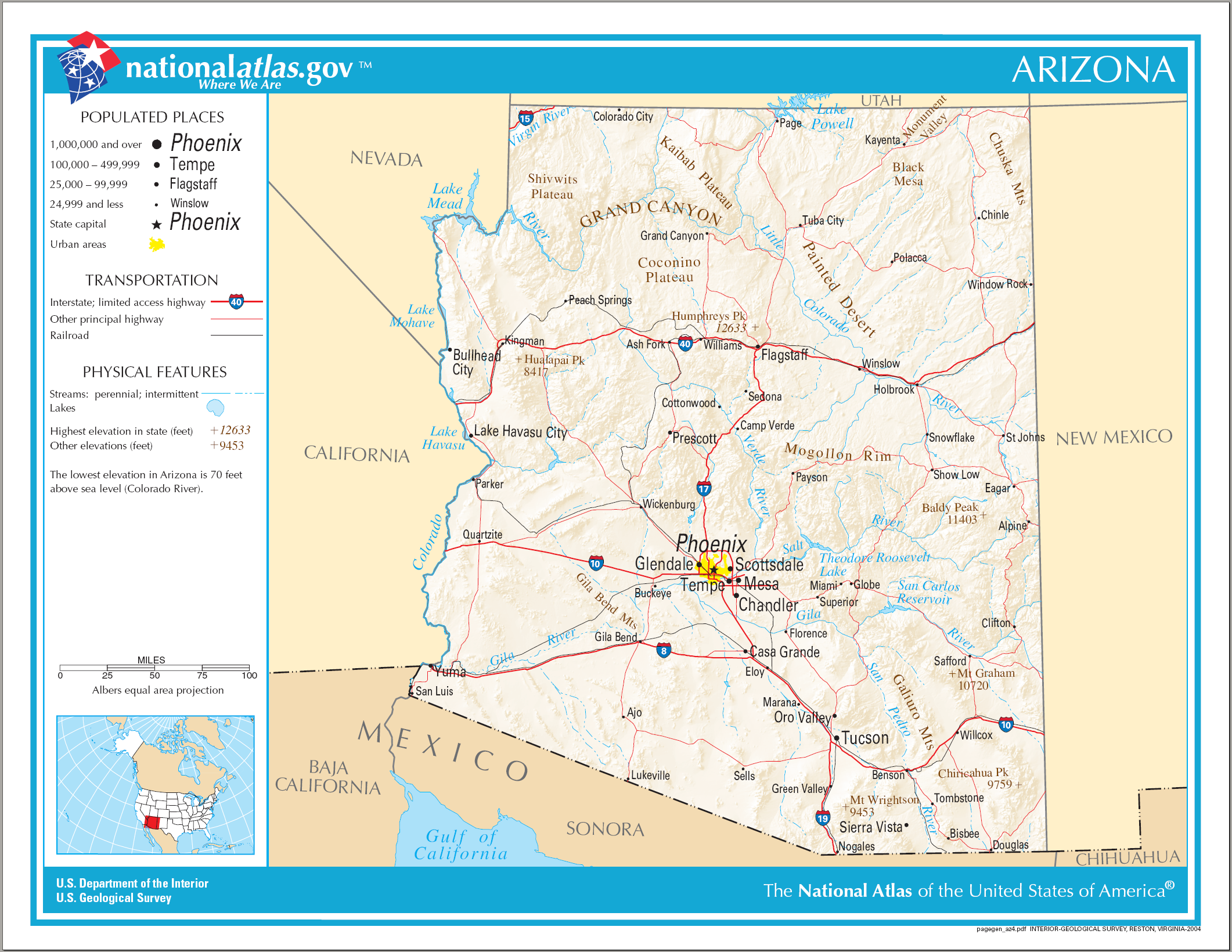
An enlargeable map of the state of Arizona showing the highways and major population centers

- Names
  - Common name: Arizona
    - Pronunciation: /ˌærɪˈzoʊnə/ ARR-iz-OH-nə
  - Official name: State of Arizona
  - Abbreviations and name codes
    - Postal symbol: AZ
    - ISO 3166-2 code: US-AZ
    - Internet second-level domain: .az.us
  - Nicknames
    - Baby State (during the 47 years that Arizona was the newest state in the Union)
    - Copper State
    - Grand Canyon State (currently used on license plates)
    - Sunset State
    - Valentine State (Arizona gained statehood on February 14, 1912)
- Adjectival: Arizona
- Demonyms
  - Arizonan
  - Arizonian

== Geography of Arizona ==
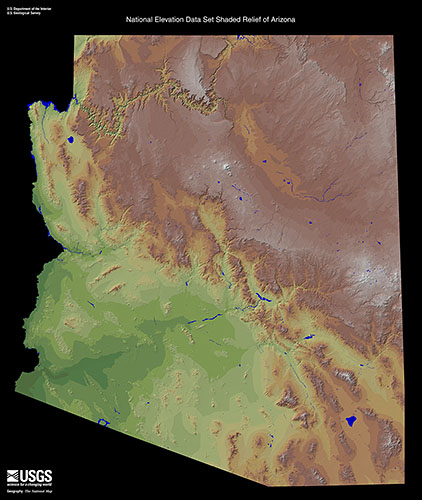
An enlargeable map of the state of Arizona

- Geography of Arizona
  - Arizona is: a U.S. state, a federal state of the United States of America
  - Location
    - Northern Hemisphere
    - Western Hemisphere
    - Americas
      - North America
        - Anglo America
        - Northern America
          - United States of America
            - Contiguous United States
              - Southwestern United States
              - Mountain West United States
  - Population of Arizona: 7,151,502 (2020 U.S. Census)
  - Area of Arizona: 113,998 square miles (295,253 km^{2}^{)}
  - Atlas of Arizona

=== Places in Arizona ===
- Places in Arizona
  - Cemeteries in Arizona
  - Historic places in Arizona
    - Ghost towns in Arizona
    - National Historic Landmarks in Arizona
    - National Register of Historic Places listings in Arizona
      - Bridges on the National Register of Historic Places in Arizona
  - National Natural Landmarks in Arizona
  - National Parks in Arizona
  - State parks in Arizona

=== Environment of Arizona ===
- Climate of Arizona
- Superfund sites in Arizona
- Wildlife of Arizona
  - Fauna of Arizona
    - Birds of Arizona
    - Reptiles
      - Snakes of Arizona

==== Natural geographic features of Arizona ====
- Lakes of Arizona
- Mountain ranges of Arizona
  - Mountains of Arizona
- Rivers of Arizona
- Valleys of Arizona

=== Regions of Arizona ===
- Regions of Arizona
  - Arizona Strip
  - Coconino Plateau
  - Colorado Plateau
  - Grand Canyon
  - Kaibab Plateau
  - Mogollon Plateau
  - Mogollon Rim
  - Mojave Desert
  - Monument Valley
  - North Central Arizona
  - Northeast Arizona
  - Northern Arizona
  - Oak Creek Canyon
  - Phoenix Metropolitan Area
  - Safford micropolitan area
  - San Francisco Volcanic Field
  - Sonoran Desert
  - Southern Arizona
  - Verde Valley
  - White Mountains

==== Administrative divisions of Arizona ====
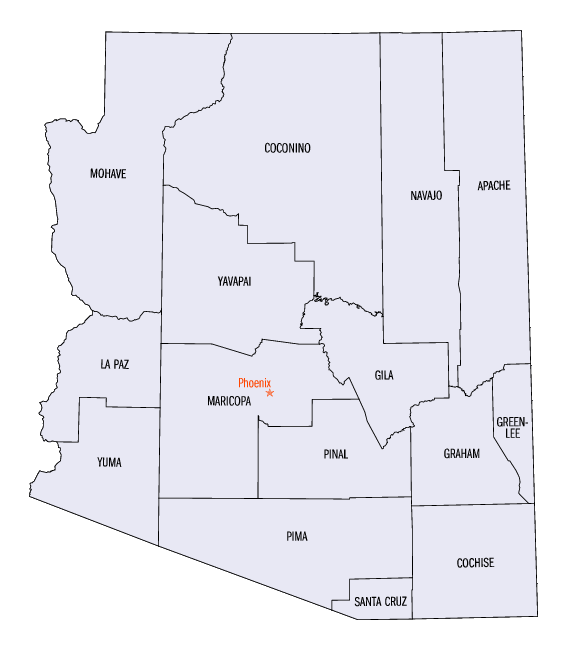
An enlargeable map of the 15 counties of the state of Arizona

- The 15 counties of the state of Arizona
  - Municipalities in Arizona
    - Cities in Arizona
      - State capital of Arizona: Phoenix
      - Largest city in Arizona: Phoenix (fifth most populous city in the United States)
      - List of city nicknames in Arizona
    - Towns in Arizona

=== Demography of Arizona ===
- Demographics of Arizona

== Government and politics of Arizona ==
- Politics of Arizona
  - Form of government: U.S. state government
  - Arizona's congressional delegations
  - Arizona State Capitol
  - Political party strength in Arizona

=== Branches of the government of Arizona ===
- Government of Arizona

==== Executive branch of the government of Arizona ====
- Governor of Arizona
  - Lieutenant Governor of Arizona
  - Secretary of State of Arizona
  - State Treasurer of Arizona
- State departments
  - Arizona Department of Transportation

==== Legislative branch of the government of Arizona ====
- Arizona Legislature (bicameral)
  - Upper house: Arizona Senate
  - Lower house: Arizona House of Representatives

==== Judicial branch of the government of Arizona ====
- Courts of Arizona
  - Supreme Court of Arizona

=== Law and order in Arizona ===
- Law of Arizona
  - Cannabis in Arizona
  - Capital punishment in Arizona
    - Individuals executed in Arizona
  - Constitution of Arizona
    - Crime in Arizona
  - Gun laws in Arizona
  - Law enforcement in Arizona
    - Law enforcement agencies in Arizona

=== Military in Arizona ===
- Arizona Air National Guard
- Arizona Army National Guard

=== Local government in Arizona ===
- Local government in Arizona

== History of Arizona ==
- History of Arizona

=== History of Arizona, by period ===
- Prehistory of Arizona
- European colonization of Arizona
  - Spanish period of Arizona, 1539–1821
    - Nueva Vizcaya, 1577–1733
      - Pimería Alta, 1687–1733
        - Spanish missions in the Sonoran Desert since 1687
    - Sonora y Sinaloa, 1733–1821
      - El Presidio Reál San Ignacio de Tubac established 1752
- Mexican period of Arizona, 1821–1848
  - Sonora y Sinaloa, 1824–1830
    - Sonora, 1830–1848
- Republic of Sonora, 1853–1854
- Gadsden Purchase of 1853–1854
  - Confederate Territory of Arizona, 1861–1865
  - Territory of Arizona, 1863–1912
    - Loss of territory to the state of Nevada, 1867
    - Powell Geographic Expedition of 1869
    - James Reavis, The 'Baron of Arizona', 1870s–1890s
    - Theodore Roosevelt Dam completed 1911
- State of Arizona becomes the 48th state admitted to the United States of America on February 14, 1912
  - Grand Canyon National Park designated on February 26, 1919
  - Hoover Dam completed 1936
  - The Great Depression and the World Wars in Arizona
  - Petrified Forest National Park designated on December 9, 1962
  - Saguaro National Park designated on October 4, 1994

=== History of Arizona, by region ===
- History of Phoenix, Arizona

=== History of Arizona, by subject ===
- History of sports in Arizona
  - History of the Arizona Cardinals
- History of universities in Arizona
  - History of Arizona State University
- Uranium mining in Arizona
- Territorial evolution of Arizona

== Culture of Arizona ==
- Culture of Arizona
  - Cuisine of Arizona
    - Tex-Mex
  - Museums in Arizona
  - Religion in Arizona
    - The Church of Jesus Christ of Latter-day Saints in Arizona
    - Episcopal Diocese of Arizona
  - Scouting in Arizona
  - State symbols of Arizona
    - Flag of the State of Arizona
    - Great Seal of the State of Arizona

=== The arts in Arizona ===
- Music of Arizona

=== Sports in Arizona ===
- Sports in Arizona

== Economy and infrastructure of Arizona ==
- Economy of Arizona
  - Communications in Arizona
    - Newspapers in Arizona
    - Radio stations in Arizona
    - Television stations in Arizona
  - Energy in Arizona
    - List of power stations in Arizona
    - Solar power in Arizona
    - Wind power in Arizona
  - Health care in Arizona
    - Hospitals in Arizona
  - Mining in Arizona
    - Copper mining in Arizona
      - Silver mining in Arizona
    - Uranium mining in Arizona
  - Transportation in Arizona
    - Airports in Arizona
    - Roads in Arizona
      - State highways in Arizona

== Education in Arizona ==
- Education in Arizona
  - Schools in Arizona
    - School districts in Arizona
      - High schools in Arizona
    - Colleges and universities in Arizona
      - University of Arizona
      - Arizona State University
      - Northern Arizona University

== See also ==
- Topic overview:
  - Arizona
  - Index of Arizona-related articles
