= Area codes 602, 480, and 623 =

Area codes for Phoenix, Arizona, United States

Coordinates: 33°30′N 112°06′W

Area codes in Arizona and surrounding states, with the 480–602–623 overlay complex highlighted in red.

Inset of the metro Phoenix area, showing the boundaries of area codes 480, 602, and 623 from 1999 to 2023, with 602 serving the middle of the present 602 area flanked by 623 to the west and 480 to the east.

Area codes 602, 480, and 623 are telephone area codes in the North American Numbering Plan (NANP) for most of the Phoenix metropolitan area in the U.S. state of Arizona.

Area code 602 is the oldest area code in Arizona, and was assigned in 1947 for the entire state. Under pressure from population growth and new telecommunications services, the numbering plan area (NPA) was reduced twice in five years in the 1990s. In 1995, the state outside metropolitan Phoenix was split off with area code 520. In 1999, a second split created two new area codes: 480 in the East Valley and 623 in the West Valley. Metro Phoenix continued to be a single rate center after the split, so that calls between the three area codes were generally local calls.

By the early 2020s, NPAs 480 and 602 were facing exhaustion within the decade, but 623 continued to have hundreds of unassigned central office codes and was not expected to exhaust for the foreseeable future. As a result, in 2021, the Arizona Corporation Commission converted the 602, 480, and 623 numbering plan areas into an overlay complex for the entire Phoenix area by removing the involved NPA boundaries in 2023. This made ten-digit dialing mandatory across the Valley; it was already required in 480.

== History ==
=== Early history and split of 602 ===
When the American Telephone and Telegraph Company (AT&T) created the first nationwide telephone numbering plan in 1947, Arizona was designated as a single numbering plan area (NPA), and received a single area code, 602, of the original 86 area codes for routing telephone toll calls into the state.

602 remained Arizona's sole area code for 48 years, despite its growth in population and telecommunication services in the second half of the 20th century. However, by 1988, Mountain Bell, the incumbent local exchange carrier in the state, forecasted growth in excess of available numbering resources with exhaustion in the fourth quarter of 1990, and requested a second area code for Arizona. The North American Numbering Plan Administration (Bellcore) denied the request and instead directed the use of interchangeable central office codes, in which the code has a middle digit of 0 or 1, increasing the number of possible central office codes from 640 to 792. This meant that in-state toll and collect calls would require ten-digit dialing, including the area code.

By the early 1990s, the need for a new area code could no longer be mitigated. In 1993, Arizona was allocated a second area code, area code 520, for all of the state outside the Phoenix metropolitan area. with an in-service date of March 19, 1995. Permissive dialing of 602 continued across Arizona until October 22, 1995. On that date, use of 520 became mandatory for rural Arizona. The new area code became mandatory in Flagstaff, Prescott, and Yuma on June 30, 1996, and in Tucson on December 31, 1996. The freed central office codes in 602 became available for new allocations in the Phoenix area.

=== Three-way split ===
The creation of 520 was intended as a long-term solution. Under initial projections, Arizona was not expected to need another area code until at least 2015. However, Arizona's population growth in the 1990s, along with the introduction of new competitive telephone service providers and telecommunications technologies (such as cell phones, pagers, and dial-up Internet access) brought 602 to the threshold for exhaustion mitigation much sooner than expected. It was determined that metropolitan Phoenix, now one of the largest toll-free calling zones in the nation, needed an additional area code. By 1997, two relief methodologies were discussed for providing additional resources in metropolitan Phoenix, and the telephone industry participants disagreed about the preferred configuration. US West, formerly Mountain Bell, supported an overlay, in which a second area code would be added to the existing 602 area. This would have required the implementation of ten-digit dialing for all local calls. The other option was a split, in which the suburban portion of the Valley would have received a new area code, with 602 retained by most of the city of Phoenix. Conversely, newer entrants to the telephone market supported a split because US West, as the dominant provider in the region, held most of the central offices in 602. By October 1998, the North American Numbering Plan Administration (NANPA) declared jeopardy conservation procedures for area code 602, freezing new allocations after October 5, 1998.

The decision rested with the Arizona Corporation Commission (ACC), which regulates public utilities. In November 1998, the ACC voted to adopt an overlay for implementation in 1999. The Corporation Commission argued that an overlay offered a longer-term solution than a split, which was projected to require additional relief within four years for metro Phoenix and twelve years for suburban areas. In early December, 480 was assigned as the second area code.

The adoption of the overlay plan was met with criticism from the public. Overlays were still a new concept at the time, and faced resistance due to the mixing of area codes in the same area and the concurrent need for ten-digit dialing. Just two weeks after the initial vote, the ACC opted to reconsider an area code split. The "doughnut" split gained two wrinkles in the process. First, the commission opted to consider placing north Phoenix in the new numbering plan area as well. Second, the idea of a three-way split gained traction, in which the East Valley and West Valley areas would be removed from 602 with a new area codes each.

On December 18, 1998, the Corporation Commission approved a three-way split to be effective on March 1, 1999. Most of the city of Phoenix, except Ahwatukee and areas north of Union Hills Drive, remained in 602, along with slivers of Tempe and Glendale. Most of the East Valley, along with Town of Paradise Valley and north Phoenix east of 22nd Street, took area code 480. Most of the West Valley, plus all of Phoenix north of Union Hills, was placed into area code 623. (556 was also considered instead of 623.) The three-way split took place even though only three million phone numbers had been issued in 602, less than half of the 7.5 million numbers available. Permissive dialing of the new area codes started on April 1.

With the exception of the slivers of the Valley that are in the 520 and 928 numbering plan areas, no long-distance charges are applied from one portion of the Valley to another. This makes the Valley one of the largest local calling areas in the United States; even with the split into three area codes, much of the Valley was still part of the Phoenix exchange.

=== Boundary elimination overlay ===
The three-way split, combined with the implementation of number pooling and other practices to encourage efficient use of telephone numbers, gave the Valley enough telephone numbers to absorb more than twenty years of growth. By October 2020, the NANPA forecast the exhaustion of area code 480 for the first quarter of 2024, and two years later (2026) for 602. 623 exhaustion was not forecast to occur until 2069; in 2021, it had 299 assigned central office codes as opposed to more than 700 in each of 480 and 602.

After NANPA initiated relief planning for 480, the state's telecommunications industry recommended to the Corporation Commission that the 1999 area code boundaries be eliminated, creating a three-code overlay complex. While this effectively allocated 23.4 million numbers to a service area of four million people, it would allow for pooled numbers to be used anywhere in the metropolitan area and for the assignment of new numbers (primarily from 623, as it had most of the unassigned codes) throughout the single rate center. By this time, overlays had become the standard for relief. No area codes had been split anywhere in the United States since 2007, and it was not possible to split the 480 area code because of the 2021 implementation of 10-digit dialing there. (Note: Prior to October 2021, area code 480 had telephone numbers assigned for the central office code 988. In 2020, 988 was designated nationwide as a dialing code for the National Suicide Prevention Lifeline, which created a conflict for exchanges that permit seven-digit dialing. 480—along with 520 and 928—was therefore scheduled to transition to 10-digit dialing by October 24, 2021.) This would save the assignment of two area codes compared to individual all-service distributed overlays of 480 and 602 and last 26 years, as opposed to 35 for the introduction of new area codes. The Corporation Commission approved this plan on November 9, 2021. Implementation began in August 2022, after the national deadline to activate 988. A six-month permissive ten-digit dialing period for the 602 and 623 areas commenced on February 11, 2023, ahead of the in-service date of September 12, 2023, of the overlay. As ten-digit dialing had already been in use in 480, 520, and 928, the boundary elimination made it mandatory statewide.

== See also ==
- List of Arizona area codes
- List of North American Numbering Plan area codes

== Notes ==
Arizona area codes: 520, 602/480/623, 928
	North: 928	
West: 928	480/602/623	East: 928, 520
	South: 928, 520	
