= Arizona Saves =

Arizona Saves is a non-profit organization offering free services to promote financial education throughout the state of Arizona. It partners with other non-profit and community development agencies, financial institutions, faith-based organizations, and city governments to provide no-cost financial education for low- to moderate-income individuals and families.

== History ==
The agency was founded in 2003 in response to the decline of savings in Arizona. It encourages saving for an emergency fund, an education, reducing debt, and retirement. In addition to financial education, it offers motivational workshops, financial counseling, and access to no-fee savings accounts. The agency is affiliated with America Saves, the Consumer Federation of America's national campaign with the same mission.

== Mission ==
Changing lives with financial skills and knowledge. Arizona Saves empowers Arizonans to build sustainable self-sufficiency by advancing healthy money management through education, saving, debt reduction, and asset building.

== Financial education ==
Arizona Saves provides financial education workshops that are free and available to the public. The classes are taught by certified volunteers with backgrounds in finance, education, and business. Approximately 400 volunteers throughout the state are trained to teach Arizona Saves' specialized curriculum.

Workshops

Arizona Saves' financial education is typically delivered in a three-part series of workshops that include:

- Building a Better Budget
- Taking Charge of Your Credit
- Preparing to Purchase a Home

Additional workshops offered:

- Banking Basics
- Choosing and Using Credit Wisely
- Preparing to Purchase a Car

Foreclosure Prevention & Crisis Budgeting

Arizona Saves added a Crisis Budgeting class in 2008 to assist the thousands of homeowners facing foreclosure in the state. The workshop teaches families how to establish financial priorities, determine which bills to pay first, and make radical short-term changes to their budgets in order to withstand financial crisis and prevent foreclosure.

Arizona Kids Saves

Arizona Saves provides free financial education to children as well. The Arizona Kids Saves program uses an age-appropriate curriculum to teach the same financial principles as the adult classes, encouraging parents and their children to discuss healthy money management at home.

== Press ==
KPNX Channel 12 - Arizona Central - "College Budgets are Critical" (July 27, 2009)
