= Arizona statistical areas =

Coordinates: 34.2744°N 111.6602°W

The U.S. State of Arizona currently has 13 statistical areas that have been delineated by the Office of Management and Budget (OMB). On July 21, 2023, the OMB delineated two combined statistical areas, seven metropolitan statistical areas, and four micropolitan statistical areas in Arizona. As of 2023, the most populous of these is the Phoenix-Mesa, AZ Combined Statistical Area, encompassing the area around Arizona's capital and largest city, Phoenix.

== Statistical areas ==
The Office of Management and Budget (OMB) has designated more than 1,000 statistical areas for the United States and Puerto Rico. These statistical areas are important geographic delineations of population clusters used by the OMB, the United States Census Bureau, planning organizations, and federal, state, and local government entities.

The OMB defines a core-based statistical area (commonly referred to as a CBSA) as the county or counties (or county-equivalents) surrounding at least one densely-settled core of at least 10,000 population, "plus adjacent counties having a high degree of social and economic integration with the core as measured through commuting ties with the counties containing the core". The OMB further divides core-based statistical areas based on population into metropolitan statistical areas (MSAs) for those with at least 50,000 and micropolitan statistical areas (μSAs) for those with 10,000 to 49,999 people.

The OMB defines a combined statistical area (CSA) as two or more adjacent core-based statistical areas where the employment interchange rate (% commuting from A to B plus % commuting from B to A) is at least 15%. The primary statistical areas (PSAs) include all combined statistical areas and any core-based statistical area that is not a constituent of a combined statistical area.

The 13 United States statistical areas and 15 counties of the State of Arizona
Combined statistical area	2025 population (est.)	Core-based statistical area	2025 population (est.)	County	2025 population (est.)
Phoenix-Mesa, AZ CSA	5,282,739	Phoenix-Mesa-Chandler, AZ MSA	5,228,938	Maricopa County, Arizona	4,689,558
Phoenix-Mesa, AZ CSA	5,282,739	Phoenix-Mesa-Chandler, AZ MSA	5,228,938	Pinal County, Arizona	539,380
Phoenix-Mesa, AZ CSA	5,282,739	Payson, AZ μSA	53,801	Gila County, Arizona	53,801
Tucson-Nogales, AZ CSA	1,124,705	Tucson, AZ MSA	1,074,685	Pima County, Arizona	1,074,685
Tucson-Nogales, AZ CSA	1,124,705	Nogales, AZ μSA	50,020	Santa Cruz County, Arizona	50,020
none		Prescott Valley-Prescott, AZ MSA	252,552	Yavapai County, Arizona	252,552
none		Lake Havasu City-Kingman, AZ MSA	228,102	Mohave County, Arizona	228,102
none		Yuma, AZ MSA	224,449	Yuma County, Arizona	224,449
none		Flagstaff, AZ MSA	144,368	Coconino County, Arizona	144,368
none		Sierra Vista-Douglas, AZ MSA	126,332	Cochise County, Arizona	126,332
none		Show Low, AZ μSA	109,946	Navajo County, Arizona	109,946
none		Safford, AZ μSA	40,157	Graham County, Arizona	40,157
none		none		Apache County, Arizona	64,445
none		none		La Paz County, Arizona	16,711
none		none		Greenlee County, Arizona	9,312
State of Arizona					7,623,818

The 11 core-based statistical areas of the State of Arizona
2025 rank	Core-based statistical area	Population				
2025 rank	Core-based statistical area	2025 estimate	Change	2020 Census	Change	2010 Census
1	Phoenix-Mesa-Chandler, AZ MSA	5,228,938	+7.91%	4,845,832	+15.57%	4,192,887
2	Tucson, AZ MSA	1,074,685	+3.00%	1,043,433	+6.44%	980,263
3	Prescott Valley-Prescott, AZ MSA	252,552	+6.92%	236,209	+11.93%	211,033
4	Lake Havasu City-Kingman, AZ MSA	228,102	+6.96%	213,267	+6.53%	200,186
5	Yuma, AZ MSA	224,449	+10.09%	203,881	+4.15%	195,751
6	Flagstaff, AZ MSA	144,368	−0.51%	145,101	+7.95%	134,421
7	Sierra Vista-Douglas, AZ MSA	126,332	+0.71%	125,447	−4.49%	131,346
8	Show Low, AZ μSA	109,946	+3.03%	106,717	−0.68%	107,449
9	Payson, AZ μSA	53,801	+0.99%	53,272	−0.61%	53,597
10	Nogales, AZ μSA	50,020	+4.93%	47,669	+0.53%	47,420
11	Safford, AZ μSA	40,157	+4.21%	38,533	+3.53%	37,220

The two combined statistical areas of the State of Arizona
2025 rank	Combined statistical area	Population				
2025 rank	Combined statistical area	2025 estimate	Change	2020 Census	Change	2010 Census
1	Phoenix-Mesa, AZ CSA	5,282,739	+7.83%	4,899,104	+15.37%	4,246,484
2	Tucson-Nogales, AZ CSA	1,124,705	+3.08%	1,091,102	+6.17%	1,027,683

== See also ==
- Geography of Arizona
  - Demographics of Arizona
