= Arizona Medical Training Institute =

Healthcare institute in Mesa, Arizona, US

Coordinates: 33°26′35″N 111°50′26″W

Arizona Medical Training Institute (AMTI) is a private, vocational healthcare institute located in Mesa, Arizona. They provide entry-level medical training for students seeking careers in nursing, clinical laboratory science and the assisted living career fields.

== Academic programs ==
- Certified Nursing Assistant (CNA)
- Phlebotomy Technician
- Medical Laboratory Assistant (MLA)
- Patient Care Technician
- Certified Caregiver
- Assisted Living Facility Manager
- CPR
- First Aide
- Continuing Education for Assisted Living Caregivers and Managers
