= Central Arizona Museum Association =

Museum association in Arizona, United States

- CAMA Logo
- Founded: 1978
- Type: 501(c) (3) non-profit association
- Tax ID no.: AZ Tax Identification #: 86-0495403; AZ Corporation Commission ID #: 0161357-0
- Purpose: Museums, including professionals and volunteers
- Region served: Arizona Counties served by CAMA: Gila, Maricopa, Yavapai, and Pinal
- Website: http://www.azcama.org/

Central Arizona Museum Association (CAMA), founded in 1978, is a 501(c)(3) regional non-profit organization registered with the Arizona Corporation Commission and dedicated to fostering collaboration among museum members, encouraging professional development, improving best practices, and promoting the value of member museums to the greater community. Central Arizona is home to diverse museums offering exhibitions and programming for students, adults, specialists, and children ranging from lectures to social hours, free events, workshops, demonstrations, trips to other destinations, and much more. CAMA is also the sponsor of International Museum Day in central Arizona.

Central Arizona Museum Association membership boundaries include the following Arizona counties: Gila, Maricopa, Pinal, and Yavapai. CAMA's individual members include directors, curators, registrars, educators, exhibit designers, public relations officers, development officers, security managers, trustees, students, and volunteers. Its museum members represent art, history, natural history, science, military, specialized, and youth museums.

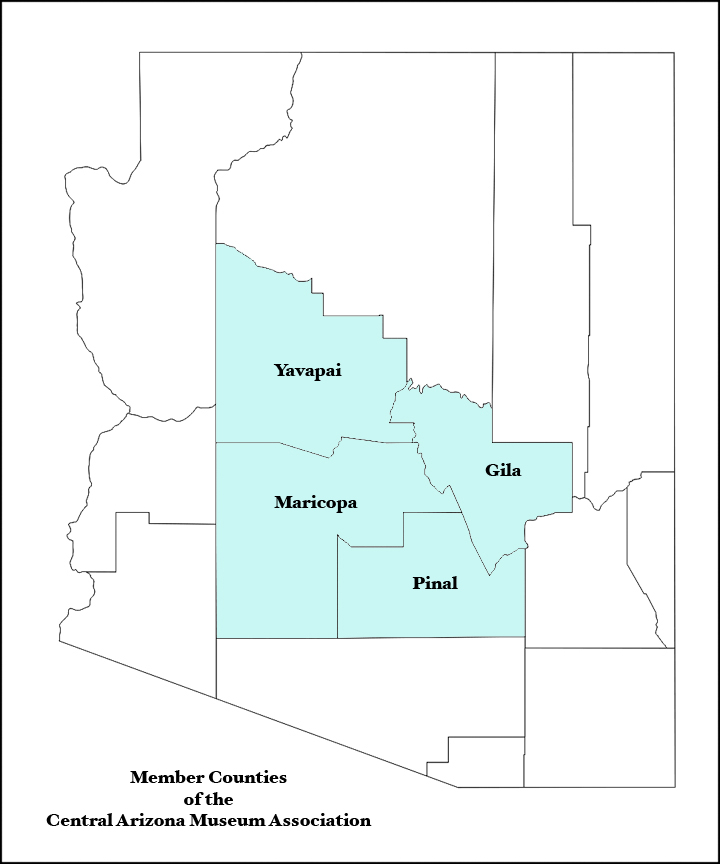
Member Counties of the Central Arizona Museum Association.

== Founding institutions and officers ==
The Central Arizona Museum Association was formally organized on February 1, 1978. Its founding institutions were the Chandler Historical Society, Glendale Historical Society, Heard Museum, Mesa Museum, the Phoenix Art Museum, Phoenix Historical Museum, and the Tempe Historical Museum.

CAMA’s founding officers were: President – Tray C. Mead, Mesa Museum; Vice-President – Peggy Burton, Tempe Historical Museum; Secretary – Mary Jane Williams, Arizona State University Art Collection; and Treasurer – Lee Scott Theisen, Phoenix Historical Museum.

== Publication ==
Every other year CAMA produces a brochure—available in printed format and online on the CAMA website—highlighting its member museums. This publication has frequently been sponsored financially by local organizations and businesses such as First Federal Savings, Salt River Project, The Arizona Bank, and Robinson's-May Department Store The brochure includes a map indicating locations of member museums, as well as their hours of operation, addresses, and institutional information.

== Programs and activities ==
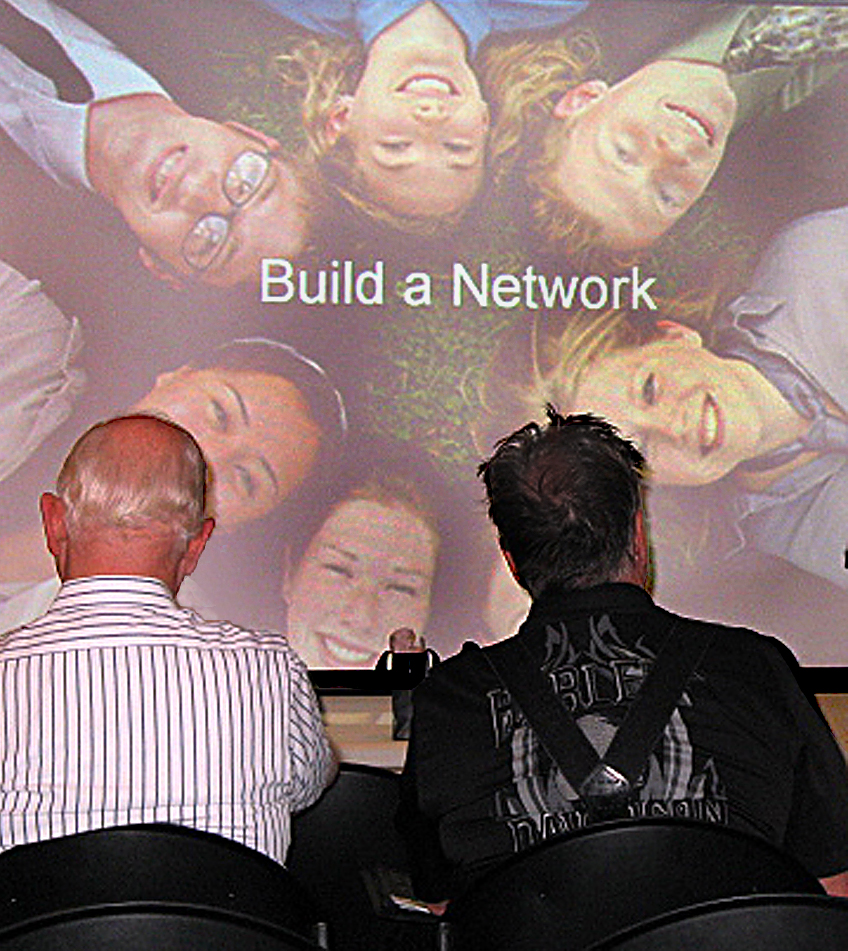
CAMA members enjoy a professional-development program at The Carnegie Library in Phoenix.

CAMA meets from September to May on the second Wednesday of each month. These hour-and-a-half professional-development meetings feature presentations and demonstrations on a wide-ranging array of topics of interest to membership. Member museums or affiliated cultural institutions serve as hosts for CAMA meetings.

CAMA members also participate in many promotional activities such as the annual Arizona Humanities Festival of the Arts in order to publicize its member museums.

== Awards given and grants received ==
CAMA provides an annual opportunity for its members to apply for stipends. These stipends award funds covering conference attendance or other professional experiences for its members. In 2013 CAMA honored deceased colleague Alice C. Jung, CAMA secretary from 2005 to 2009, by dedicating that year's stipends in her memory.

In June 1999 and April 2000, CAMA received a $10,000 grant from Robinson's-May Department Store to help promote local museums in what subsequently became Robinson's-May Museum Month, and, in May 2004, Robinson's-May granted $18,000 for Museum Month.

On September 24, 1999, the Institute of Museum and Library Services (IMLS) granted CAMA $27,300.00 for Project SMART (Small Museums of Arizona Resource Training), a collaboration between Arizona Humanities Council, ASU Museum Studies, and the Museum Association of Arizona to publish a resource manual and several professional-development workshops.

== International Museum Day (IMD) ==
Each year during the month of May, Central Arizona Museum Association (CAMA) sponsors the celebration of International Museum Day (IMD) with its member museums offering special promotions, programs, and discounts. IMD, created in 1977 by the International Council of Museums (ICOM), raises public awareness about the vital role museums play in creating a sense of community. In 1978, 1984, 1994, and 2014 CAMA was awarded gubernatorial proclamations in celebration of International Museum Day.

Currently known as International Museum Day, over the years this museum promotion has also been celebrated by CAMA as Arizona Museum Week, Arizona Museum Month, and Summer at the Museum. Participating member museums offer discounts and special programming for young and old alike.

CAMA provides printed promotional materials to publicize IMD and its participating member museums, and these publications are often corporately sponsored. All of CAMA's International Museum Day materials—printed and broadcast—are available in both English and Spanish.

The Arizona Memory Project also archives a large collection of International Museum Day materials.

== Archives ==
Central Arizona Museum Association Records are housed at Arizona State University Library: Archives & Special Collections Reference Services located at the Tempe campus.

== See also ==
- International Council of Museums
- List of museums in Arizona
