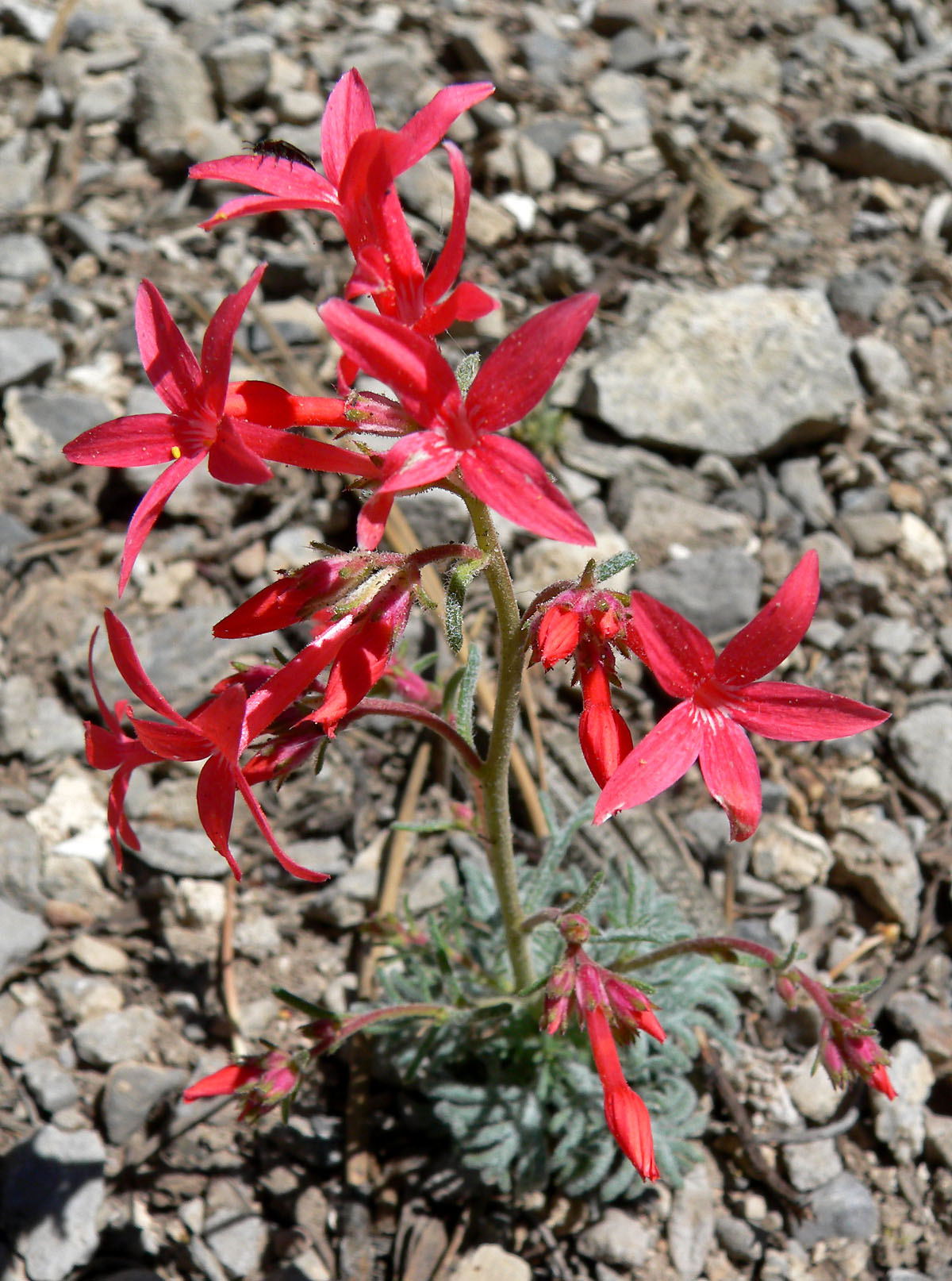

Scientific classification
- Kingdom: Plantae
- Clade: Tracheophytes
- Clade: Angiosperms
- Clade: Eudicots
- Clade: Asterids
- Order: Ericales
- Family: Polemoniaceae
- Genus: Ipomopsis
- Species: I. arizonica

Binomial name
- Ipomopsis arizonica (Greene) Wherry

= Ipomopsis arizonica =

Species of flowering plant

Ipomopsis arizonica (Arizona firecracker or Arizona ipomopsis) is a flowering plant in the family Polemoniaceae, native to the mountains of the Mojave Desert sky islands from southeastern California east through southern Nevada to northern Arizona, growing at 1500–3100 meters in elevation. It is found in rocky places in the desert, as well as washes.

== Description ==
Ipomopsis arizonica is a monocarpic herbaceous perennial plant, dying after flowering and producing seeds. It grows from 10 to 30 cm tall, with pinnately lobed leaves 3–5 cm long with 7–11 lobes. The flowers are produced 5–13 on a one-sided spike, each flower tubular, 1 to 2 centimeters long, with five corolla lobes each up to a centimeter long; they are bright red, and pollinated by hummingbirds.
