= Yuman music =

Music genre

Yuman music is the music of Yumans, a group of Native American tribes from what is now Southern California and Baja California. They include Paipai, Havasupai, Yavapai, Walapai, Mohave, Quechan, Maricopa, Tipai-Ipai, Cocopa, and Kiliwa people. Folk songs in Yuma culture are said to be given to a person while dreaming. Many individuals who are in emotional distress go to a secluded area for a few weeks, there to receive new songs.

== Singing ==
The songs are sung in particular cycles. Among Mohave people, a cycle could consist of 50–200 songs. Together thirty song cycles exists, all of which were initially dreamed by singers. A complete song cycle took an entire night to perform, which would be accompanied by gourd rattles or beating on baskets.

== Instruments ==
While singing is the focus of Yuman music, it can be accompanied by rattles, which can be made of gourd or tin cans.

== Documenting ==
Daniel Golding a Quechan filmmaker created the documentary, "Songs of the Colorado," featuring singers from Yuman speaking tribes in Arizona and Mexico. Of the music, Golding says, "The songs are all sung in the language, so if you're not learning and picking up the language, then you won't be able to understand the songs ... there are actually words telling stories..."

== Evolving musical forms ==
An intertribal marching band called the Yuman Indian Band dates back at least to the 1920s. Composed of Quechan, Mohave, and other tribal members, they changed their name to the Quechan Indian Band in 1981.

== Notable people ==
Preston Arrow-Weed, a Quechan elder and lead singer, Vernon Smith (Quechan), and Dale Phillips, vice chairman of the Cocopah Indian Tribe are some of the foremost Yuman musicians today. Jefferson Lewis is a younger singer.
