= Arizona Native Plant Society =

Environmental organization

- Abbreviation: AZNPS
- Formation: 1977; 49 years ago
- Type: Nonprofit
- Tax ID no.: 86-0322366
- Purpose: Ecological / native plant preservation
- Headquarters: Tucson, Arizona
- Region served: Arizona
- President: Doug Ripley
- Website: https://aznps.com/

The Arizona Native Plant Society (AZNPS), based in Tucson, Arizona, United States, works to promote knowledge, appreciation, conservation and restoration of Arizona native plants and their habitats, as well as the use of native plants in urban landscapes and gardens.

The society has eleven chapters, based in Cochise County, Peach Springs, Flagstaff, Phoenix, Prescott, Santa Cruz County, Tucson, Upper Gila, White Mountains, Upper Gila and Yuma. In 2023 the society had 650 members. Happenings, a newsletter about chapter activities, comes out quarterly.

== History ==
AZNPS began in 1977, when nursery owners, landscapers, and professionals created the non-profit society dedicated to educating Arizonans about the state's native plants, as well as other xeric landscape plants, including many new horticultural imports. Early on, AZNPS published a series of eight landscaping booklets designed to educate the public about the use of native and xeric plants in desert landscapes.

About the year 2000, AZNPS began to promote the total use of native plants in the landscape, as native plants are best adapted to local habitats and soils, use the least amount of water, and are easier to maintain and keep disease-free than are imported plants. They also provide an extension of native habitat into the urban area as a "corridor" for native pollinators and other wildlife.

In 2024, the director was Doug Ripley. The society offers events where the public can get involved in nurturing natural plants in their area.

== Publications ==
- Plant Press Arizona (twice a year)
- Happenings
