= List of Arizona area codes =

Clickable map of Arizona area codes in blue (and border states)

The U.S. state of Arizona is divided into three geographically distinct numbering plan areas (NPAs) which are identified by a total of five area codes, with one of the NPAs being configured as an overlay complex with two code.

602 was the original area code for Arizona, and was split in 1995 into 602, serving metropolitan Phoenix, and 520, serving the remainder of the state. In 1999, 602 was split into 480, 602, and 623, which were recombined in 2023. 520 was split in 2001 to form area code 928.

Area code	Year	Parent NPA	Overlay	Numbering plan area
602	1947	–	480/602/623	Phoenix metropolitan area
480	1999	602	480/602/623	Phoenix metropolitan area; After having been split from 602 in 1999, the three area codes were recombined in 2023 into an overlay complex.
623	1999	602	480/602/623	Phoenix metropolitan area; After having been split from 602 in 1999, the three area codes were recombined in 2023 into an overlay complex.
520	1995	602	–	Southern Arizona, including Tucson and its metropolitan area, Casa Grande, Nogales, and Sierra Vista
928	2001	520	–	Yuma, Kingman, Flagstaff, Prescott, the Arizona portion of the Navajo Nation, and Safford

== See also ==
- List of North American Numbering Plan area codes
