= Repatriation flight program =

United States–Mexico government program

The Repatriation flight program, officially named "Interior Repatriation Program", was a United States and Mexico government program destined to fly back Mexican citizens who had illegally crossed the frontier between the United States and Mexico to their home country for free.

Arizona taxpayers funded the program. It ran from July 12 to September 30 of 2004. It was a pilot program; other American states planned to develop similar programs. The total number of Mexicans repatriated was over 14,000.

According to United States Border Patrol officials, the program was created to help save the lives of those who crossed the desert. They were usually caught by border patrol police in southern Arizona towns or near the Sonora border, processed, and taken to Tucson International Airport for their flights back home.

The airplanes used in these operations were all Boeing 757 jets.

The program was ultimately stopped because of cost: tax-payers ended up paying US $15 million during the three-month trial period, amounting to US $1,000 for each passenger. According to the border patrol police, the program helped the number of immigrant deaths around the Tucson area drop by 28 percent, but statistics showed that Arizona had a record number of immigrant deaths in 2004, with 171 dead persons accounted for.

Immigrants caught and flown back to Mexico would usually be taken back to Guadalajara, Jalisco, or Mexico City International Airport in Mexico City. Despite the harsh conditions of travelling by foot from Mexico to the United States border, a survey run at Mexico's largest international airport by a North American newspaper showed that 50 percent of those returned to Mexico by air would be willing to try to return to the United States illegally again.
