= Arizona Conservatory for Arts and Academics =

Charter school in Phoenix, Arizona, US

Location
- Elementary: 16454 N. 28th Avenue; Secondary: 2820 West Kelton Lane; Phoenix, Arizona 84053; United States

Information
- Type: Charter School
- Founded: 2003
- Founder: Choice Education and Development, Inc
- Superintendent: Curt Cardine
- Principal: Dr. Jenson
- Grades: K–12
- Hours in school day: Near an 8 hour school day
- Mascot: Gnome
- Affiliation: Sequoia Schools
- Art Areas: Communication Arts, Dance, Digital Media, Music, Theatre, Visual Arts
- Website: azconservatory.org

Arizona Conservatory for Arts & Academics (ACAA) is a public and a non-tuition college preparatory charter school. It serves grades for K–12 and serves non-traditional schedules and Methodology. The school has two separate campuses one for Elementary school (K–5th grade) and the other for Secondary school (6th–12th grades). It emphasizes kids creativity by having certain classes and have certified educators of the subject to teach/help them. The students attend school Monday–Thursday because on Fridays some students have to go because they need help with classes or with performance activities. ACAA has a wide selection of courses that are taught in 14 academic classrooms. Their academic classes are: English, mathematics, science, history, foreign languages, and visual arts. Their performing arts are: Ballet, piano, band, orchestra, guitar, theater, musical theater, and many many more. The academic faculty members integrate the arts into their classes, while the arts faculty integrates academic standards in their curriculum.

== Campus ==
ACAA had two campuses that are located across from each other. The elementary campus had academic classrooms and the secondary campus has 14 academic classrooms, a media center, science lab, two dance studios, a 135-seat theater, a 28 station piano lab, percussion and guitar labs, voice and musical theater rooms, a visual arts studio, and a drama room. In late 2024 both sides were merged, the elementary staff and students were merged into the secondary campus leaving the elementary campus empty.

Locations

Elementary campus: 16454 N. 28th Avenue 33°38′11″N 112°07′11″W

Secondary campus: 2820 W. Kelton Lane 33°38′14″N 112°07′12″W

== History ==
The school was opened in 2003 starting with the secondary campus being managed by Sequoia Schools. Later in 2013 ACAA expanded and made the elementary campus and the school is now a part of the Choice Education and Development. In 2024, Ernesto Moncada-Cota, a Spanish teacher, was jailed on multiple felony charges, one of which being sexual misconduct with a minor.

== Accreditation and ratings ==
ACAA was accredited in 2014 and received an A grade status for 2009–2010 and 2010–2011 school year from the Arizona Department of Education. As of 2025 the school is in poor condition and many of the reviews left on the schools Google page are very critical about the school's staff, students, and programs.

== Awards and accolades ==
ACAA received the 2010 award for Top Performing Arts School from the Arizona Department of Education. In 2011 they received the Nation Center for Educational Achievement for Higher Performing School. It maintained an '"exceeds standards" result on the 2009–2011 Arizona Instrument to Measure Standards.
