= List of Superfund sites in Arizona =

A map of superfund sites in Arizona.

This is a list of Superfund sites in Arizona designated under the Comprehensive Environmental Response, Compensation, and Liability Act (CERCLA) environmental law. The CERCLA federal law of 1980 authorized the United States Environmental Protection Agency (EPA) to create a list of polluted locations requiring a long-term response to clean up hazardous material contaminations. These locations are known as Superfund sites, and are placed on the National Priorities List (NPL).

The NPL guides the EPA in "determining which sites warrant further investigation" for environmental remediation. As of September 19, 2024, there were ten Superfund sites on the National Priorities List in Arizona. Three other sites have been cleaned up and removed from it; no sites are currently proposed for addition to the NPL.

== Superfund sites ==
Deleted from National Priorities List
Not on National Priorities List

CERCLIS ID	Name	County	Reason	Proposed	Listed	Construction completed	Partially deleted	Deleted
AZD980695969	Abandoned Uranium Mines	Navajo Nation	Physical hazards and uranium contamination from 520 abandoned uranium mines.	–	–	–	–	–
AZD008399263	Apache Powder Company	Cochise	Groundwater contaminated with arsenic, fluoride, nitrate, and perchlorate. Soil contaminated with arsenic, antimony, barium, beryllium, chromium, lead, manganese, nitrate, 2,4-DNT, 2,6-DNT, lead, vanadium pentoxide, paraffins, and TNT from the commercial production of chemicals.	06/10/1986	08/30/1990	09/26/2008	–	–
AZD980735666	Hassayampa Landfill	Maricopa	Groundwater contamination by VOCs including haloalkanes, alkyl halides and toluene, from landfilling of hazardous waste. Soil contamination by VOCs, heavy metals, pesticides and lime wastes.	06/10/1986	07/22/1987	09/30/1997	–	–
AZD980695969	Indian Bend Wash Area	Maricopa	Groundwater contamination (and isolated soil contamination) by VOCs including TCE and PCE from former industrial disposal practices.	12/30/1982	09/08/1983	09/28/2006	05/01/2003	–
AZ0000309013	Iron King Mine - Humboldt Smelter	Yavapai	Arsenic contamination of soil, sediments, surface water and ground water, including several private wells and one municipal well. Arsenic and lead contamination of soil in residential yards.	03/19/2008	09/03/2008	–	–	–
AZ0570024133	Luke Air Force Base	Maricopa	Soil and potential groundwater contamination with waste oils and VOCs from base operations.	07/14/1989	08/30/1990	09/25/2000	–	04/22/2002
AZD009004177	Motorola, Inc. (52nd Street Plant)	Maricopa	Soil and groundwater contamination by various chlorinated hydrocarbons used as solvents.	10/15/1984	10/04/1989	–	–	–
AZD980735724	Mountain View Mobile Home Estates	Gila	Asbestos contamination of soil and air from asbestos milling operations.	12/30/1982	09/08/1983	04/18/1988	–	04/18/1988
AZD980496780	Nineteenth Avenue Landfill	Maricopa	Landfill site, containing some hazardous waste, was at risk from leaching, river erosion and flooding. Low-level groundwater contamination.	12/30/1982	09/08/1983	02/17/1998	–	09/25/2006
AZD980695902	Phoenix-Goodyear Airport Area	Maricopa	Groundwater contamination by chromium, solvents, TCE and other VOCs.	12/30/1982	09/08/1983	–	–	–
AZD980737530	Tucson International Airport Area	Pima	Groundwater contamination by TCE and some other substances.	12/30/1982	09/08/1983	–	–	–
AZ7570028582	Williams Air Force Base	Maricopa	Groundwater contamination by light non-aqueous phase liquids and VOCs; soil contaminated by VOCs, PCBs and pesticides from past disposal practices.	07/14/1989	11/21/1989	–	–	–
AZ0971590062	Yuma Marine Corps Air Station	Yuma	Asbestos soil contamination and groundwater contamination by PCE, TCE and DCE.	06/24/1988	02/21/1990	09/20/2000	–	–

== See also ==
- List of Superfund sites
- List of environmental issues
- List of waste types
- TOXMAP
