= List of places in Arizona =

List of places in the U.S. state of Arizona.

The current cities, towns, unincorporated communities, counties, and other recognized places in the state. It also includes information on the number and names of counties in which a place lies, and its lower and upper ZIP code bounds when applicable.

== See also ==
- Category: Lists of places in Arizona
- List of cemeteries in Arizona
- List of cities and towns in Arizona
- List of counties in Arizona
