= 2027 in Colorado =

- Decades: 2000s; 2010s; 2020s
- See also: History of Colorado; Historical outline of Arizona; List of years in Colorado; 2027 in the United States

The following is a list of events of the year 2027 in Colorado.

== Incumbents ==
=== State Government ===
- Governor: Jared Polis (D) until January 12; Phil Weiser (D) from January 12

== Events ==
=== Predicted and scheduled ===
- April 6 – 2027 Colorado Springs mayoral election
- April 7 – 2027 Denver mayoral election
- October 4–10 – 2027 World Lacrosse Sixes Championships
