= 2021 in Colorado =

- Decades: 2000s; 2010s; 2020s
- See also: History of Colorado; Historical outline of Arizona; List of years in Colorado; 2021 in the United States

The following is a list of events of the year 2021 in Colorado.

== Incumbents ==
- Governor: Jared Polis (D)

== Events ==
- March 22 — 2021 Boulder shooting: Nine civilians and a police officer are killed during a mass shooting at a King Soopers supermarket in Boulder.
- March 23 — The suspect in the previous day's mass shooting at a King Soopers supermarket in Boulder, which resulted in the deaths of ten people, is charged with ten counts of murder.
- April 6 — Colorado reports its first cases of the Lineage P.1 variant of SARS-CoV-2 in two people from Boulder County.
- May 9 — 2021 Colorado Springs shooting: Six people are killed by a gunman in a mass shooting during a birthday party at a residence in Colorado Springs. The gunman, who committed suicide at the scene, is believed to have been a boyfriend of one of the victims.
- August 2 — Denver Mayor Michael Hancock announces a COVID-19 vaccine mandate for school employees, contractors and volunteers.
- November 5 — Two hyenas at Denver Zoo test positive for COVID-19, marking the first time the virus has infected that animal worldwide.
- December 30 — Grass fires in Colorado, prompt the evacuation of the town of Superior and the cities of Louisville and Broomfield.
