= COVID-19 vaccination mandates in the United States =

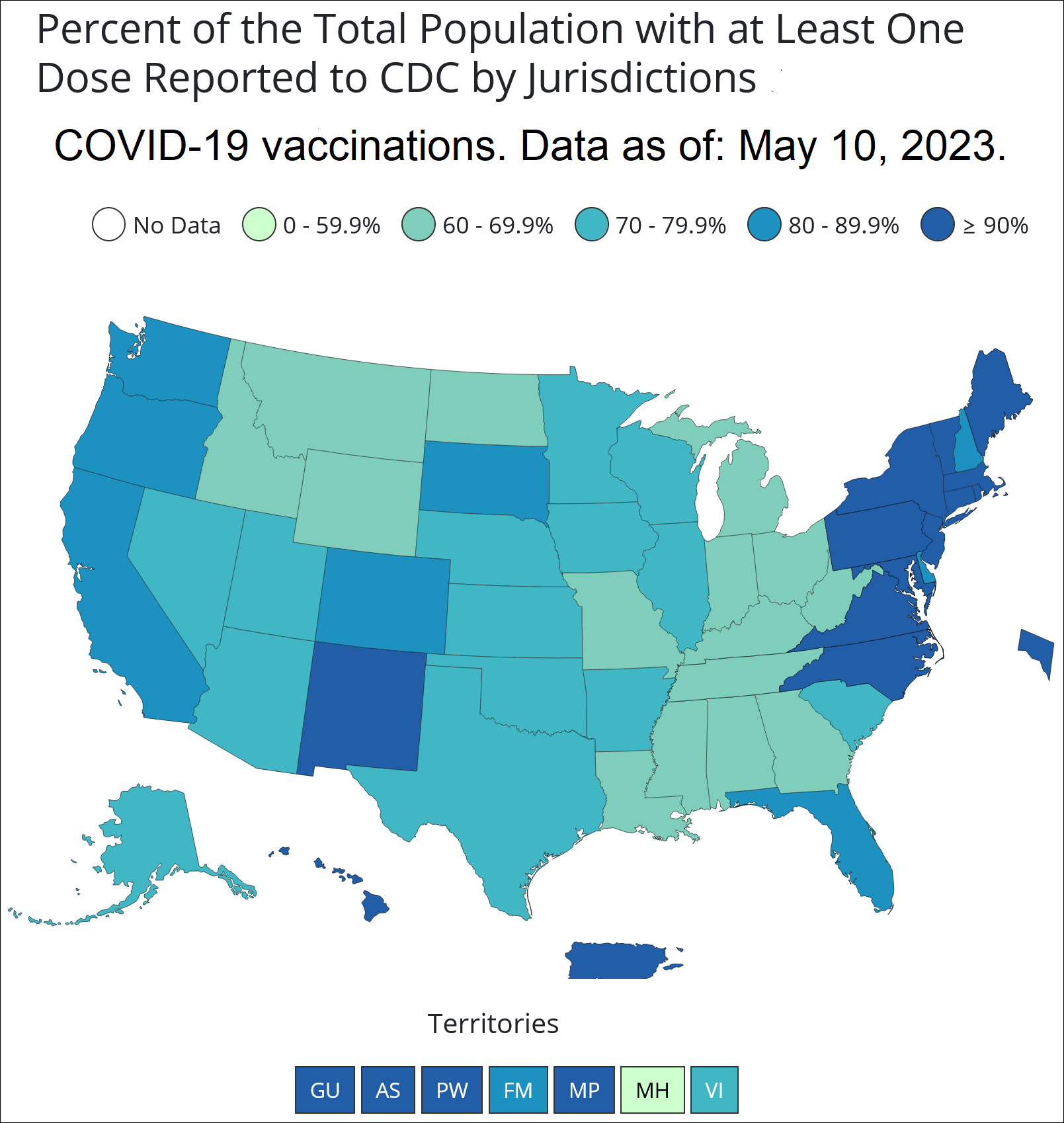
United States COVID-19 vaccination. Percentage with at least one vaccination dose. See Commons source for date of last upload. US territories: GU = Guam. AS = American Samoa. RP = Republic of Palau. FM = Federated States of Micronesia. MP = Northern Mariana Islands. MH = Marshall Islands. VI = Virgin Islands.

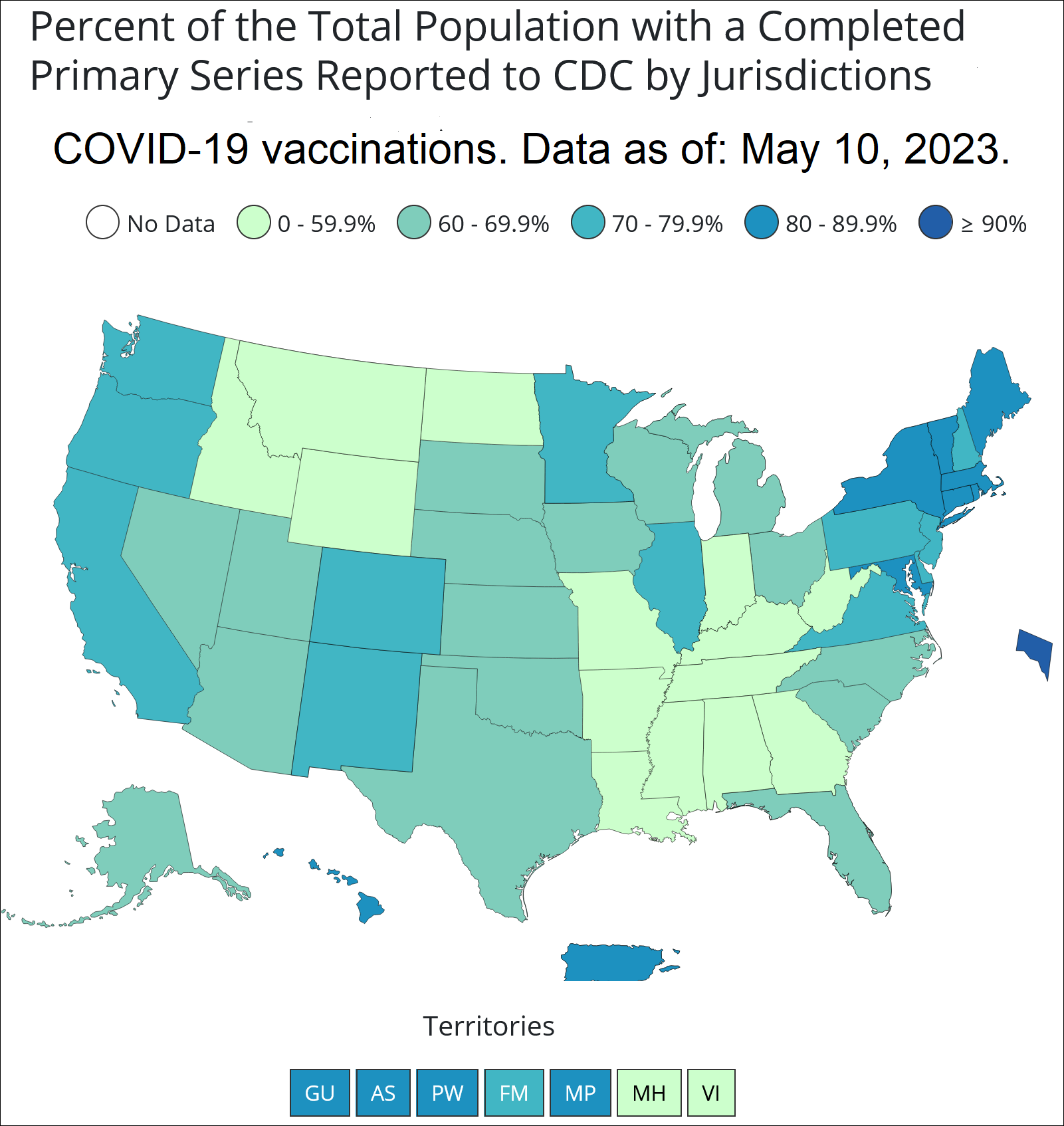
Percent of people of all ages who received all doses prescribed by the initial COVID-19 vaccination protocol. Two of the three COVID-19 vaccines used in the U.S. require two shots to be fully vaccinated. The other vaccine requires only one shot. Booster doses are recommended too. See Commons source for date of last upload.

Over the course of the COVID-19 pandemic, COVID-19 vaccine mandates have been enacted by numerous states and municipalities in the United States, and also by private entities. In September 2021, President Joe Biden announced that the federal government would take steps to mandate COVID-19 vaccination for certain entities under the authority of the federal government or federal agencies. Most federal mandates thus imposed were either overturned through litigation, or withdrawn by the administration, although a mandate on health care workers in institutions receiving Medicare and Medicaid funds was upheld.

All federal mandates were lifted when the national emergency was declared to have ended in May 2023. A small number of states have gone in the opposite direction, through executive orders or legislation designed to limit vaccination mandates.

== Background ==
A precedent for mandatory vaccination already existed before the Covid pandemic, as healthcare workers performing exposure-prone procedures were required to be vaccinated against seriously communicable diseases like Hepatitis B.

When acting as president-elect in December 2020, Biden said he did not intend to mandate that all citizens receive a COVID-19 vaccine, arguing that "I will do everything in my power as president to encourage people to do the right thing and when they do it, demonstrate that it matters." BBC News writer Anthony Zurcher felt that Biden avoided a general mandate due to the "stubbornly pervasive" anti-vaccine movement in the country, which "could create a groundswell of opposition that would prove counterproductive to public health." Furthermore, in April 2021, the Biden administration ruled out plans for a federal database, "credential", or "passport" to verify COVID-19 vaccination status, citing data privacy and discrimination concerns.

== Worker and traveler mandates ==
=== Private mandates ===
As of July 2021, vaccination mandates have largely been enforced by means of employers, including private businesses and governmental divisions, while some private businesses such as restaurants and event promoters may also decline to serve customers if they do not present proof of vaccination. In August 2021, several cities announced plans to require proof of vaccination for patrons of certain types of non-essential indoor venues.

In some cases, provisions that are described as a vaccine mandate are officially termed as a constraint requiring those who are not fully-vaccinated for COVID-19 to undergo regular testing—thus allowing for medical or religious exemptions to be fulfilled when needed.

In June 2021, the initial EUA status of the vaccines led to challenges as to whether such mandates were legal, as FDA regulations state that a person must be informed "of the option to accept or refuse administration of the product, of the consequences, if any, of refusing administration of the product, and of the alternatives to the product that are available and of their benefits and risks". As these regulations refer to an "option to accept or refuse", some opponents of vaccination initially questioned whether a vaccine issued under EUA can be mandated as a vaccination policy. However, courts addressing the issue uniformly held that such mandates were permissible, with the court in Klaassen v. Indiana University in particular addressing this subject at length.

In May 2021, the Equal Employment Opportunity Commission (EEOC) issued guidance stating that employers can require their employees to be vaccinated, unless covered by an exemption under the Americans with Disabilities Act (medical exemptions) or Title VII of the Civil Rights Act (religious exemptions). By contrast, a presidential waiver would have been required for the U.S. military to mandate vaccination while still under EUA status. When the Pfizer vaccine formally received FDA approval in August 2021, it was anticipated that more organizations and employers would become willing to introduce vaccine mandates.

In order to protect their employees and patrons, some businesses and entities may mandate that their on-site employees be vaccinated. Some employers were initially hesitant to impose vaccine requirements, citing concerns over their validity due to the present EUAs among other factors. A June 2021 survey of companies found that only 3% planned to implement a vaccine mandate. Some businesses may also voluntarily require that their customers or patrons present proof of vaccination or a recent negative test in order to receive service or access.

However, by late-July 2021 due to the threat of Delta variant, a number of major private employers across many industries announced vaccination requirements for employees. Similar mandates were announced for California state employees, and federal employees and contractors.

Many U.S. colleges and universities, both public and privately owned, have started requiring students to be vaccinated before attending in-person classes in fall 2021. This has led to a black market in counterfeit CDC vaccination cards for students who want to violate this requirement instead of attending a different school.

The National Football League made rule changes intended to place liabilities on players who are not vaccinated, including monetary fines for each individual violation of COVID-19 protocol, and making teams liable for games canceled due to COVID-19 outbreaks involving unvaccinated players if they cannot be made up during the regular season (which will count as a loss by forfeit, and require the team to pay financial compensation to the opposing team).

In mid-August 2021, Anschutz Entertainment Group (AEG) and Live Nation Entertainment both announced that they will mandate vaccination at their venues (where legally possible) in October 2021, with AEG requiring all attendees, staff and performers to be vaccinated with no exceptions effective October 1, and Live Nation requiring attendees to be vaccinated or have recently tested negative for COVID-19 effective October 4.

=== Federal mandates ===
In September 2021, Biden announced the Biden administration COVID-19 action plan, a six-point plan of new measures to help control the pandemic, which included new executive orders and regulatory actions to effectively mandate vaccination for COVID-19 among a large swath of the American workforce. Executive orders were announced directing all federal agencies to mandate the vaccination of their employees (with exceptions as required by law, and no option for regular testing in lieu of vaccination) per guidance to be developed by the Safer Federal Workforce Task Force, and all future government contracts to include a clause requiring compliance with guidance to be developed by the Safer Federal Workforce Task Force (likely to include a similar mandate). The administration set a November 22, 2021 deadline for most federal employees to be fully vaccinated and a January 4, 2022 deadline for federal contractors to be vaccinated.

In September 2021, the employees of all federally-funded Medicaid and Medicare-certified health care facilities, and Head Start program facilities, were required to be vaccinated, as ordered through the United States Department of Health and Human Services (HHS). Companies with more than 100 employees could either require vaccination for all (and give their workers four hours' paid time off for their vaccination appointments); or require any unvaccinated employees to wear masks and be tested weekly for COVID-19, according to an Occupational Safety and Health Administration (OSHA) Emergency Temporary Standard. These two policies together —federally-funded healthcare facilities and large companies— would apply to 100 million workers and were scheduled to take effect on January 4, 2022.

By September 2021, many Republicans asserted Biden's order was an unconstitutional overreach of federal authority, and some Republican governors said they would sue to block it. Despite the network being specifically cited by Biden during his speech as a major employer with vaccine requirements, Fox News pundits criticized Biden; Sean Hannity described Biden as having "cancelled all medical freedom". The next day, Biden responded to the threats, stating "Have at it. Look, I am so disappointed that, particularly some of the Republican governors have been so cavalier with the health of these kids, so cavalier with the health of their communities. We're playing for real here, this isn't a game, and I don't know of any scientist out there in this field that doesn't think it makes considerable sense to do the six things I've suggested."

In November 2021, the Sixth Circuit Court of Appeals stayed the mandate and ordered OSHA take no steps to implement or enforce the Emergency Temporary Standard. The United States Supreme Court took up emergencies requests to determine if both the OSHA and healthcare facilities mandates can be enforced while litigation continued at lower courts, with oral arguments for both cases held on January 7, 2022.

On January 13, 2022, the Supreme Court ruled in National Federation of Independent Business v. Occupational Safety and Health Administration that OSHA did not have the authority to enforce the mandate to private companies while ruling in favor of the mandate for healthcare workers in Biden v. Missouri. In the OSHA case, the court issued a per curiam decision that stated that OSHA's mandate exceeded their congressional authority that only covered workplace hazards and not broad public ones, and that it should be left to Congress and the states to determine the response to pandemics like COVID-19. A dissenting minority opinion from Justices Stephen Breyer, Sonia Sotomayor, and Elena Kagan states that OSHA is the best agency to determine how to protect workers and that courts should not impede OSHA's actions on occupational safety related to COVID-19. In the healthcare workers' mandate, the per curiam opinion found that this fell within the congressional authority given to the HHS in the use of Medicare and Medicaid funds as to further protect the patients they deal with, and vacated the stay on this mandate ordered by the Eighth Circuit. Both Justices Clarence Thomas and Samuel Alito wrote dissenting opinions, each joined by Justices Neil Gorsuch and Amy Coney Barrett. Both opinions stated that the mandate was too broad to likely apply to the limited congressional authority that HHS was given. On January 25, 2022, the White House officially withdrew the OSHA mandate after its defeat in the Supreme Court to focus on other options that may stand a better chance of surviving appeals.

In May 2023, the White House announced the lifting of vaccination mandates for government employees and contractors, and for international travelers to the United States.

== List of current mandates ==
=== Federal vaccine mandates ===
Several federal vaccine mandates were suspended by courts or withdrawn by the administration during their pendency. All remaining mandates were withdrawn by the administration as of May 11, 2023.

Applicability	Scope	Authority	Ref.
Federal contractors	Requires U.S. Government contractors to be vaccinated by 18 January 2022, unless granted a medical or religious exception.	Executive Order 14042	
Health care workers	Requires healthcare workers at any facility that receives funding from the Center for Medicare and Medicaid Services to be vaccinated by 4 January 2022, unless granted a medical or religious exception.	Omnibus COVID-19 Health Care Staff Vaccination Rule	
Private sector employees	Requires employees of businesses with 100 or more employees to be vaccinated by 6 January 2022 or undergo weekly testing.	OSHA Emergency Temporary Standard on Vaccines and Testing	
Federal government employees	Requires federal government employees to be vaccinated by 22 November 2021, unless granted a medical or religious exception.	Executive Order 14043	
Military personnel	Requires military personnel to be vaccinated by various deadlines from November 2, 2021 (U.S. Air Force) to June 2022 (certain reserve components), unless granted a medical or religious exception.	Memorandum from the Secretary of Defense of 24 August 2021	
Noncitizen air travelers	Requires noncitizens, with certain exceptions, traveling to the United States by airplane to be vaccinated by the date of entry. Exceptions include persons under age 18, airplane crews, diplomats, permanent residents, citizens of one of 43 nations with limited vaccine availability, persons issued exemptions due to humanitarian or national security reasons, vaccine trial participants, and those with documented medical contraindications to vaccination.	Presidential Proclamation of 25 October 2021	

=== State and territorial vaccine mandates for workers ===
Several states have enacted vaccine mandates for certain employees.

State	State government workers	Health care workers	Educational workers	Hospitality workers	Testing alternative
California	Yes	Yes	Yes		Yes (except for healthcare workers)
Maine		Yes			No
Washington	Yes	Yes	Yes		
Hawaii	Yes				Yes
Delaware	Yes				
Minnesota	Yes				
Pennsylvania	Yes (if involved in healthcare settings)				Yes
Oregon	Yes (in October, for executive branch employees)	Yes	Yes		
New York	Yes (by September 6)	Yes			
Illinois	Partial (for workers in high-contact settings)		Yes		
New Mexico	Yes				
Vermont	Partial (for workers in high-contact settings)				
Maryland	Partial (for workers in corrections, veterans and healthcare settings)	Yes			
District of Columbia	Yes	Yes (by September 30)			
Guam	Partial (for executive branch workers)				
Puerto Rico	Yes	Yes	Yes	Yes	Yes
Connecticut	Yes	Partial (for nursing home workers)	Yes		Yes
Rhode Island		Yes			
Massachusetts	Yes	Partial (for nursing home workers)			
Colorado		Yes			
New Jersey	Yes	Partial (State-owned health care agencies, correctional facilities)	Yes		Yes

=== County and municipal vaccine mandates for workers ===
City or county	State	City/county government workers	Health care workers	Educational workers	Hospitality workers	Testing alternative
Tucson	Arizona	Yes				Yes
Boston	Massachusetts	Yes				Yes
Los Angeles	California	Yes				Yes
New York City	New York	Yes		Yes		Yes
San Diego	California	Yes				Yes
Jackson	Mississippi	Yes				Yes
Newark	New Jersey	Yes				Yes
Hoboken	New Jersey	Yes				Yes
Richmond	Virginia	Yes				Yes
Denver	Colorado	Yes				Yes
Pasadena	California	Yes				Yes
New Bedford	Massachusetts	Yes				Yes
San Jose	California	Yes				Yes
New Orleans	Louisiana	Yes				Yes
San Francisco	California	Yes				Yes
Aquinnah	Massachusetts	Yes				Yes
Philadelphia	Pennsylvania	Yes				
Portland	Oregon	Yes (by September 10)				
Seattle	Washington	Yes				
King County	Washington	Yes				
Providence	Rhode Island	Yes				
St. Louis	Missouri	Yes				
Sacramento	California	Yes				
Chicago	Illinois	Yes				

== Mandates for entry to private facilities ==
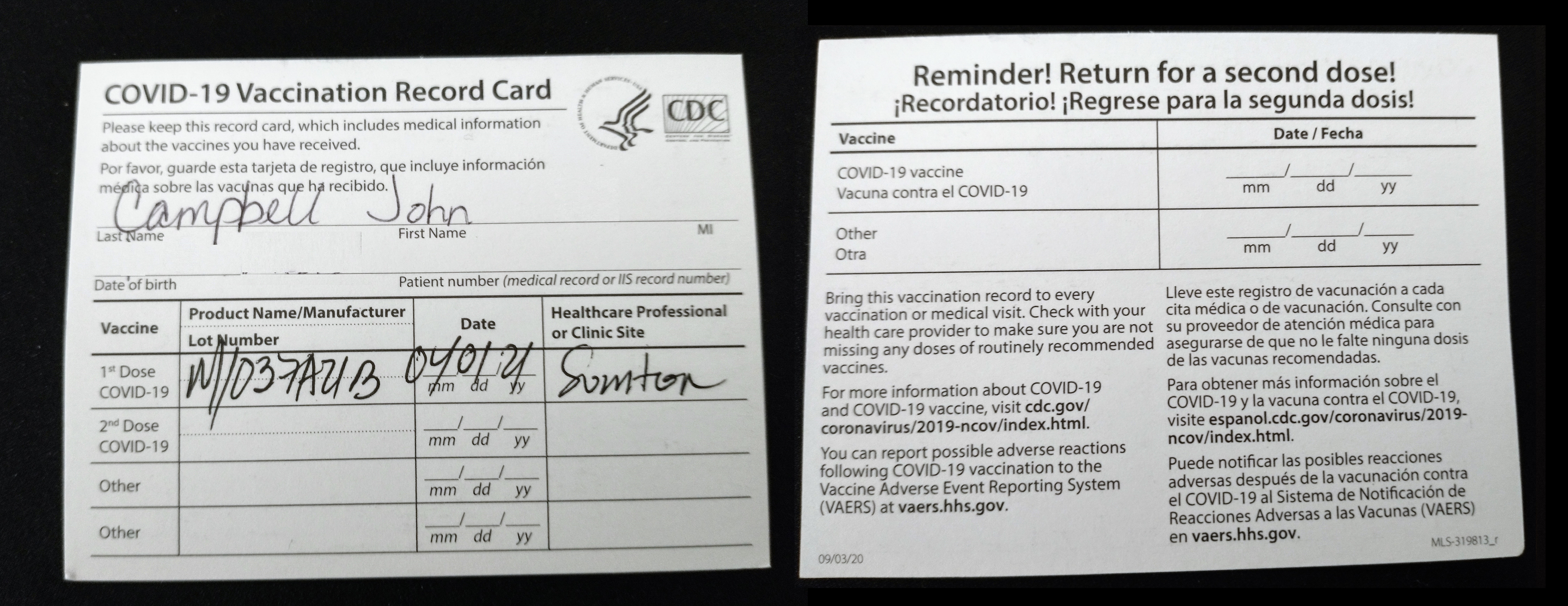
A COVID-19 vaccination record card issued by the CDC.

Vaccination incentives were used in California and New York as part of their easing of restrictions in mid-2021; New York allowed seating sections of outdoor venues to operate at full capacity if they were exclusive to vaccinated attendees, and California allowed venues to operate at a higher capacity than normally allowed under its Blueprint for a Safer Economy framework if all patrons present proof of vaccination or a recent negative test.

With the increased spread of Delta variant in the United States and to overcome vaccine hesitancy, several major U.S. cities announced in August 2021 that individuals 12 and older would be required to present proof of vaccination in order to enter certain non-essential indoor businesses, such as gyms, dine-in restaurants, bars, and entertainment venues;

- On August 3, 2021, Mayor of New York City Bill de Blasio announced that a vaccine mandate known as Key to NYC Pass would take effect August 16, with enforcement beginning September 13. Anyone 12 and older must present proof that they have received at least one vaccine dose (using either a physical record, the state Excelsior Pass app, or the city's NYC COVID Safe app) in order to enter indoor gyms, bars, restaurants, and entertainment venues. Ahead of the announcement, The Broadway League, Carnegie Hall, and the Metropolitan Opera had announced similar policies, with the latter two also prohibiting attendees younger than 12 from attending shows.
- San Francisco announced a vaccine mandate on August 12, 2021, requiring the patrons of indoor bars, restaurants, and any entertainment venue that serves food or drink, to be fully-vaccinated.
- New Orleans also announced a vaccine or negative test requirement on August 12, 2021, effective August 23, mandating that patrons of indoor venues such as gyms, restaurants, casinos, arenas, and stadiums, as well as any outdoor gathering of more than 500 people that exceeds half of the venue's total capacity, present proof of vaccination or recent negative test.
- On September 10, 2021, West Hollywood, California announced that by October 11, patrons 18 and older of the indoor portions of health and fitness facilities, personal care facilities, and any venue that serves food and drink indoors, must be fully-vaccinated.
- On September 14, 2021, Contra Costa County, California announced that a health order requiring patrons 12 and older of indoor gyms, bars, restaurants, and entertainment venues to be fully-vaccinated, effective September 22. The employees of such venues must also be fully-vaccinated by November 1, 2021, or they must be tested weekly for COVID-19.
- On September 15, 2021, the Los Angeles County Department of Public Health (LAC DPH) announced that effective October 7, proof of at least one vaccine dose will be required to enter indoor bars and nightclubs, and outdoor events with more than 10,000 people. Beginning November 4, full vaccination will be required.
  - On August 11, 2021, Los Angeles City Council unanimously approved a motion proposing an ordinance requiring patrons 12 and older of indoor public spaces to have received at least one vaccine dose. On October 6, 2021, the ordinance was approved, taking effect November 8; it is stricter than the Los Angeles County order, applying to all indoor restaurants, bars, shopping malls, recreation and entertainment venues, personal care services, and the indoor areas of city facilities. It also applies to outdoor events with more than 5,000 people.
- On December 13, 2021, the Philadelphia Department of Public Health announced a vaccination requirement for entry to any indoor establishment that serves food or drink on the premises. This includes bars, restaurants, movie theaters, sports venues, and bowling alleys, among other establishments. Effective January 3, 2022, all patrons over age 5 must display proof of vaccination. During the first two weeks of the mandate, a negative COVID test within 24 hours will be accepted; starting on January 17, negative tests will no longer be accepted, and only proof of vaccination will be accepted.
- On December 21, 2021, the Chicago Department of Public Health announced a vaccination requirement for entry to restaurants, bars, gyms, and entertainment venues in the city. Effective January 3, 2022, all patrons above the age of five entering such businesses are required to provide proof of full vaccination and covered businesses must keep records of their protocol for implementing the order.
- On December 23, 2021, the Cook County Department of Public Health issued an order nearly identical to that of Chicago's covering the suburban portion of the county over which it has jurisdiction (excluding only Chicago, Evanston, Skokie, Oak Park, and Stickney Township). However, several municipalities within the county announced that they would refuse to enforce the county's order.
- On December 23, 2021, Mayor of Newark, New Jersey Ras J. Baraka announced a vaccination requirement for entry to indoor restaurants, bars, movie theaters, gyms, sports venues, concert venues, bowling alleys, and auditoriums/convention centers. Effective January 10, all patrons over age 5 must display proof of at least one COVID vaccination dose. Starting February 10, proof of full vaccination must be displayed.
- On December 23, 2021, Skokie, Illinois issued an order in line with those of Chicago and Cook County, but entering into effect later on January 10, 2022.
- On December 28, 2021, Oak Park, Illinois issued an order in line with that of Skokie, also entering into effect on January 10, 2022.
- On December 29, 2021, Highland Park, Illinois issued an order similar to Cook County's and Chicago's, covering dining establishments and entertainment venues although excluding gyms, entering into effect on January 7, 2022.
- On December 30, 2021, Evanston, Illinois issued a similar order to those issued by Skokie and Oak Park, also entering into effect January 10, 2022.
- On January 12, 2022, the mayors of Minneapolis and St. Paul announced a vaccination or negative test requirement for entry to indoor restaurants, bars, movie theaters, gyms, sports venues, concert venues, bowling alleys, and auditoriums/convention centers. Effective January 19, all patrons over age 5 must display proof of vaccination or a negative COVID test taken within the past 72 hours for entry into non-ticketed establishments. For ticketed events, the regulation goes into effect on January 26.

== Political views ==
As with mask mandates support and opposition towards mandates and proof of vaccination by businesses has largely fallen along party lines, with Democrats mostly supporting such measures and Republicans mostly against. Concern for human rights also has an influence on people across the ideological spectrum. Compulsory vaccination is an interference with the human right of bodily integrity, which is a part of the right to private life enshrined in the Universal Declaration of Human Rights as well as in the European Convention on Human Rights. However, not every interference with this right is automatically illegal. Media has also contributed to the politicizing of mandates. Restrictions have not only sparked severe protests by groups of citizens, but also resulted in the strengthening of populist movements and their political representatives, who are generally skeptical of policies that help to stem the spread of the COVID-19 virus a phenomenon labeled as 'medical populism'

As of August 12, 2021 20 states all controlled by Republicans have passed legislation or issued executive orders prohibiting state agencies from issuing vaccine passports or otherwise requiring proof of vaccination as a condition of service. Alabama, Florida, Iowa, Montana, and Texas also prohibit private businesses from requiring proof of vaccination as a condition of service, with the Florida order threatening fines of $5,000 per-instance, the Montana order terming it as a prohibition of "discrimination" on the basis of vaccination status (with exceptions for long-term care facilities and public schools), and the Texas order enforceable by state licensing agencies (such as the Texas Alcoholic Beverage Commission, which has threatened to revoke the liquor licenses of establishments that request proof of vaccination in violation of state law). Texas is also the only state where event requirements for even a negative COVID-19 test is prohibited. The Iowa ban prohibits businesses requiring proof of vaccination from receiving state grants and contracts. There have also been bills enacted or introduced to prohibit employers from enforcing vaccine mandates, and prohibiting vaccine mandates that apply to students.

Some politicians such as Marjorie Taylor Greene have claimed that under the Privacy Rule of the Health Insurance Portability and Accountability Act (HIPAA), individuals may not be asked to provide their vaccination status. The Privacy Rule only applies to specific "protected health information" being stored by a "covered entity" (such as a health plan, health insurer, health care clearinghouse, or medical service provider), and does not generally prohibit private businesses or employers from requesting information on vaccination status directly from individuals.

In February 2023, Idaho state senator Tammy Nichols introduced a bill proposing that it be a misdemeanor to administer any mRNA vaccine.

== Legal challenges ==
Several states have executive orders or passed laws completely prohibiting or limiting COVID-19 vaccine mandates for employers to include various exemptions including proof of antibodies, weekly testing or personal protective equipment use and allow employees who lose jobs for refusing a COVID-19 vaccine to collect unemployment benefits until they can find a job that does not mandate vaccination. Arkansas, Florida, Iowa, Kansas, and Tennessee have all passed laws that allow workers who are fired for refusing COVID-19 vaccine mandates to collect unemployment benefits. A sixth state, Nebraska, issued a Department of Labor Guidance Document that provides the same protection – an individual "who began work for an employer prior to an employer instituting a COVID-19 vaccine requirement" and is discharged for refusing the mandate would not be disqualified from receiving unemployment and at least 15 other states are in the process of passing legislation.

The following 22 states have laws prohibiting proof of COVID-19 vaccination for service by state and local government entities: Alabama, Alaska, Arizona, Arkansas, Florida, Georgia, Idaho, Indiana, Iowa, Kansas, Michigan, Missouri, Montana, North Dakota, New Hampshire, Oklahoma, South Carolina, South Dakota, Tennessee, Texas, Utah and Wyoming. (Note: Five states (Alabama, Florida, Iowa, Montana, and Texas) also prohibit private businesses from requiring vaccination.)

The following 17 states have laws prohibiting schools from mandating COVID-19 vaccines for students: Idaho, Utah, Arizona, Montana, Oklahoma, South Dakota, Kansas, Texas, Arkansas, Indiana, Ohio, Tennessee, Alabama, South Carolina, Georgia, New Hampshire and Florida.

On January 26, 2022, the Attorney General of Virginia issued a legal opinion that said "State universities cannot require the Covid-19 vaccine for students to attend in-person or enroll, unless the commonwealth's legislature includes it among required immunizations for colleges." "The legal guidance, which is not equivalent to law, has no direct consequences if it isn't followed," the Attorney General's office said. "But if an individual decided to sue a university for not following the attorney general's guidance, they could use the Attorney General's opinion in court." In his guidance, Miyares writes that "Virginia's higher education public institutions fall under the control of the General Assembly, which has enacted statutes governing student health and outlined certain immunizations that students need to enroll. Absent specific authority conferred by the General Assembly, public institutions of higher education in Virginia may not require vaccination against COVID-19 as a general condition of students' enrollment or in-person attendance." Within a week Virginia's largest public universities ended their COVID-19 vaccination requirement for students to attend in person or to enroll. Virginia Tech, George Mason University, the University of Virginia and Virginia Commonwealth University announced updates in their policies for the ongoing spring semester. Other Virginia public universities including James Madison University, the College of William & Mary and Old Dominion University, also announced they are ending their COVID-19 vaccination requirements for students.

On February 4, 2022, 16 states filed a new lawsuit challenging the federal CMS mandate, the lawsuit was filed in U.S. District Court for the Western District of Louisiana. This lawsuit follows a Texas post Supreme Court ruling lawsuit filed in Texas that was dismissed.

On May 29, 2021, a lawsuit was filed by 117 employees of Houston Methodist Hospital, who were fired for refusing to comply with the hospital's vaccine mandate. The lawsuit was dismissed by district judge Lynn Hughes roughly a couple weeks later. An appeal was filed following the ruling.

In July 2021, Norwegian Cruise Line sued the Surgeon General of Florida over the state's prohibition of vaccine mandates by private businesses. In August district judge Kathleen M. Williams issued a preliminary injunction in favor of Norwegian, stating that the government failed to "provide a valid evidentiary, factual, or legal predicate" and that "documentary proof of vaccination will expedite passengers' entry into virtually every single country and port where Plaintiffs intend to sail."

A vaccine mandate being enforced by Indiana University requiring those who are not vaccinated for COVID-19 to submit to weekly testing if they attend in-person classes was challenged by a group of eight students who argued in Klaassen v. Indiana University that risks of the vaccines outweighed the benefits and that it was a violation of the 14th Amendment. District judge Damon R. Leichty rejected a motion for a preliminary injunction, ruling that the university had a right to "a reasonable and due process of vaccination in the legitimate interest of public health for its students, faculty and staff", that the students had alternatives such as agreeing to testing or applying for an exemption, remote learning, or going to a different university if they did not want to be vaccinated and that "the situation here is a far cry from past blunders in medical ethics like the Tuskegee Study." The 7th Circuit Court of Appeals, in an opinion by judge Frank Easterbrook, upheld the ruling, citing case law dating back to smallpox in 1905.

On August 12, 2021, Supreme Court Justice Amy Coney Barrett, who receives emergency appeals from the Seventh Circuit, denied a request for emergency relief in the Indiana University matter; she acted with no comment, and did not refer the case to the full Supreme Court. Media outlets believed that Barrett's decision to uphold the mandate may have implications in future legal challenges.

In September 2021, the anti-vaccine group America's Frontline Doctors (AFLDS) filed a lawsuit attempting to overturn New York City's proof of vaccination mandate. The suit alleged that the mandate was inherently discriminating against African Americans, citing a perceived hesitation towards vaccines among this population stemming from the Tuskegee Syphilis Study.

In December 2021, a federal appeals court upheld a district court's injunction blocking Biden's vaccine mandate for healthcare workers; the ruling applies only to ten Republican-led states, namely Alaska, Arkansas, Iowa, Kansas, Missouri, Nebraska, New Hampshire, North Dakota, South Dakota and Wyoming. On January 13, 2022, the Supreme Court overturned the injunction.
