= 2023 in Colorado =

- Decades: 2000s; 2010s; 2020s
- See also: History of Colorado; Historical outline of Arizona; List of years in Colorado; 2023 in the United States

The following is a list of events of the year 2023 in Colorado.

== Incumbents ==
- Governor: Jared Polis (D)

== Events ==
- April 11 — Tina Peters is sentenced to four months of house arrest and 120 hours of community service after being found guilty of a misdemeanor. Peters, a supporter of the Donald Trump 2020 presidential campaign, was found guilty of misdemeanor obstruction during legal proceedings over her efforts to overturn the 2020 presidential election results.
- April 23 — Governor Jared Polis signs multiple bills strengthening the state's gun laws.
- May 23 — The parents of Christian Glass reach a settlement with state and local agencies to receive $19 million in response to their son's killing by a sheriff's deputy a year earlier. In 2022, Glass, a 22-year-old man, was killed after he called 911 over a mental health crisis in Silver Plume and had held a knife as a sheriff's deputy responded to the call and shot Glass fatally.
- June 7 — 2023 Denver mayoral election: Mike Johnston declares victory as the new mayor of Denver in an election against opponent Kelly Brough.
- June 26 — Anderson Lee Alrich, the perpetrator of the 2022 shooting at Club Q, an LGBTQ club, pleads guilty to murdering five people.
- June 30 — The U.S. Supreme Court rules 6-3 that a web designer in Colorado had a First Amendment right to refuse services to a same-sex couple who wanted her to make them a website.
- July 30 — Jordan Steinke, a police officer from Fort Lupton, is convicted of two misdemeanors related to a 2022 incident in which he parked his police car containing a handcuffed woman on a set of train tracks, causing a train to hit the car and severely injuring the woman.
- August 1 - Centura Health splits up with hospitals owned by AdventHealth rebranding.
- October 12 — Randy Roedema, a police officer, is convicted of criminally negligent homicide and assault in relation to the 2019 killing of Elijah McClain, an unarmed Black man in Aurora who was administered a fatal amount of ketamine by paramedics while in police custody.
- November 7 — Coloradans vote no on Proposition HH, which would make changes to state finances, and vote yes on Proposition II, which would fund preschool programs using excess revenue from taxes on tobacco products.
- November 17 — An ex-sheriff's deputy pleads guilty to failing to intervene to stop the death of Christian Glass.
- December 22 — Paramedics Peter Cichuniec and Jeremy Cooper are found guilty of criminally negligent homicide over their involvement in the death of Elijah McClain.
- December 23 — The Colorado Supreme Court rules that Trump is ineligible to appear on the ballot for the 2024 U.S. presidential election for incitement of insurrection, referring to the January 6, 2021 Capitol attack.
- December 27 — The Colorado Republican Party sends a petition to the U.S. Supreme Court asking them to review the ruling from the Colorado Supreme Court.
