= COVID-19 vaccination in the United States =

Plan to immunize against COVID-19

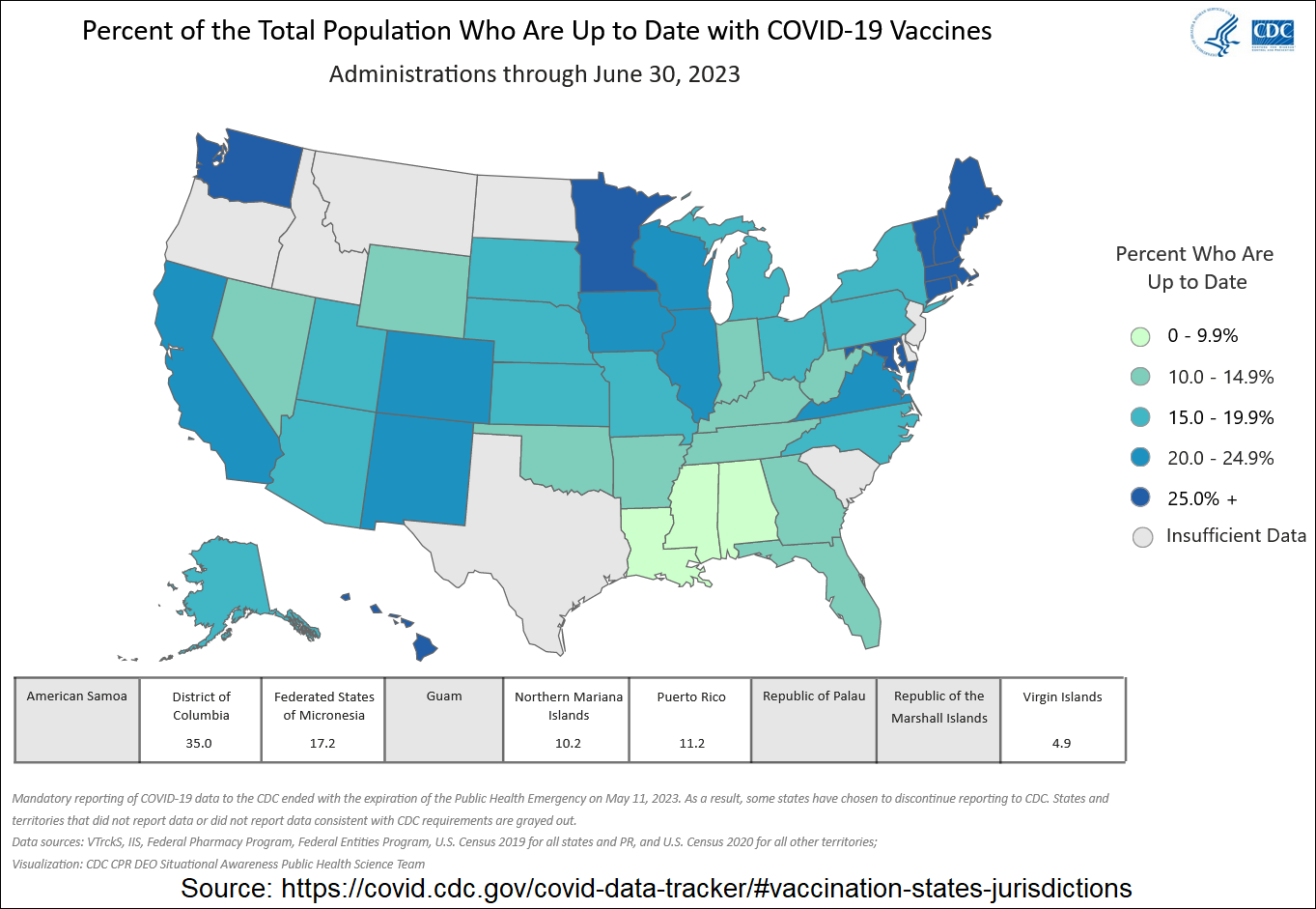
- Percent of the total population who are up to date with COVID-19 vaccines. Hover on the states on the map at the source page for exact numbers. Right-click on the source map, and then click "Show as a table" to get all the numbers.
- Date: December 14, 2020 – May 11, 2023
- Location: United States Compact of Free Association: Palau Marshall Islands Micronesia
- Cause: COVID-19 pandemic in the United States
- Organized by: Centers for Disease Control and Prevention
- Participants: 262,323,837 people have received at least one dose administered of Pfizer–BioNTech, Moderna or Janssen (August 17, 2022); 223,684,995 people have been fully vaccinated (both doses of Pfizer–BioNTech or Moderna, or one dose of Janssen)
- Outcome: 79% of the United States population has received at least one dose of a vaccine 67% of the United States population is fully vaccinated
- Website: CDC

Weekly confirmed COVID-19 deaths

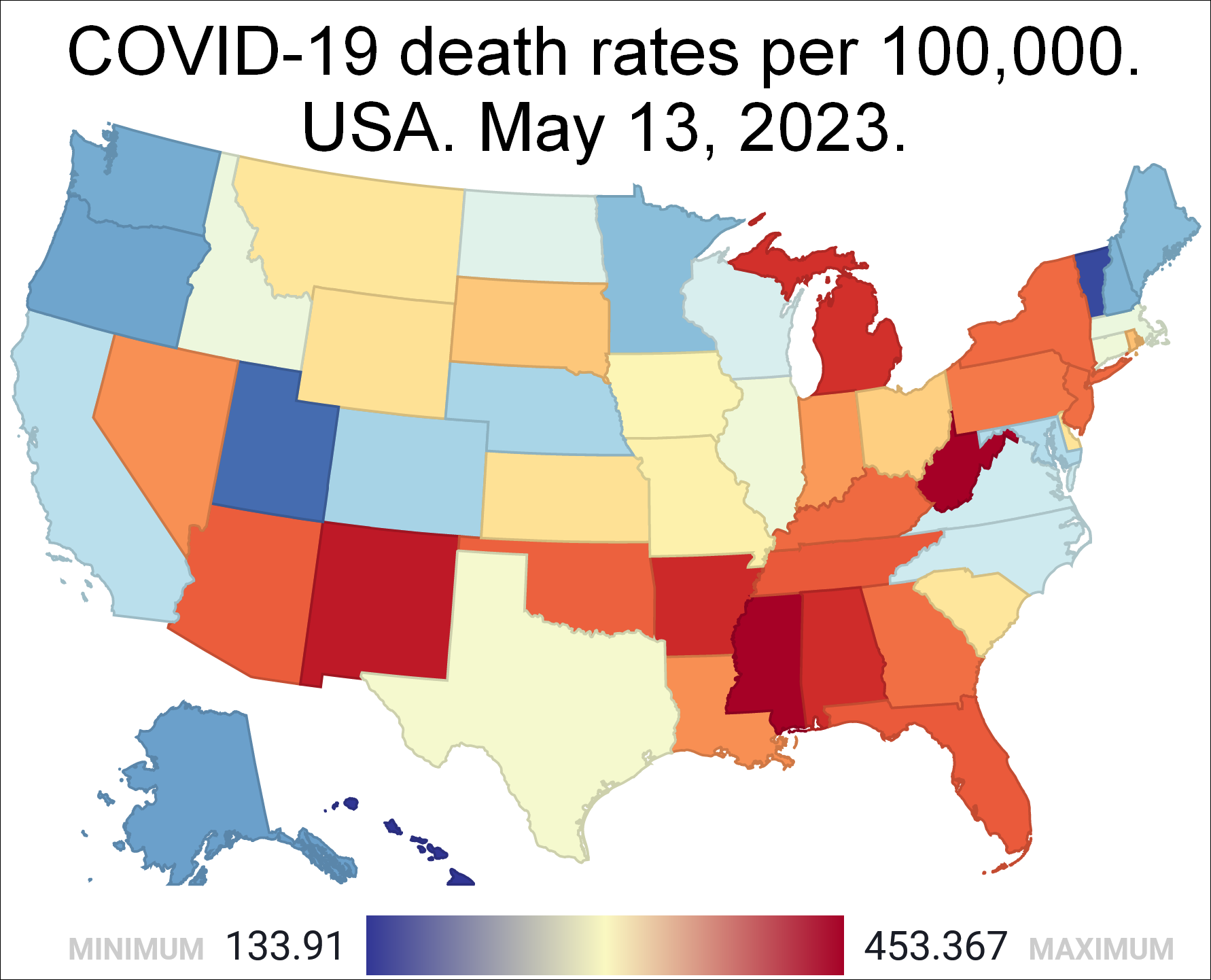
Map of cumulative COVID-19 death rates by US state.

Percent of the total population of all ages by state or territory who completed the COVID-19 vaccination primary series. Booster doses are also recommended.

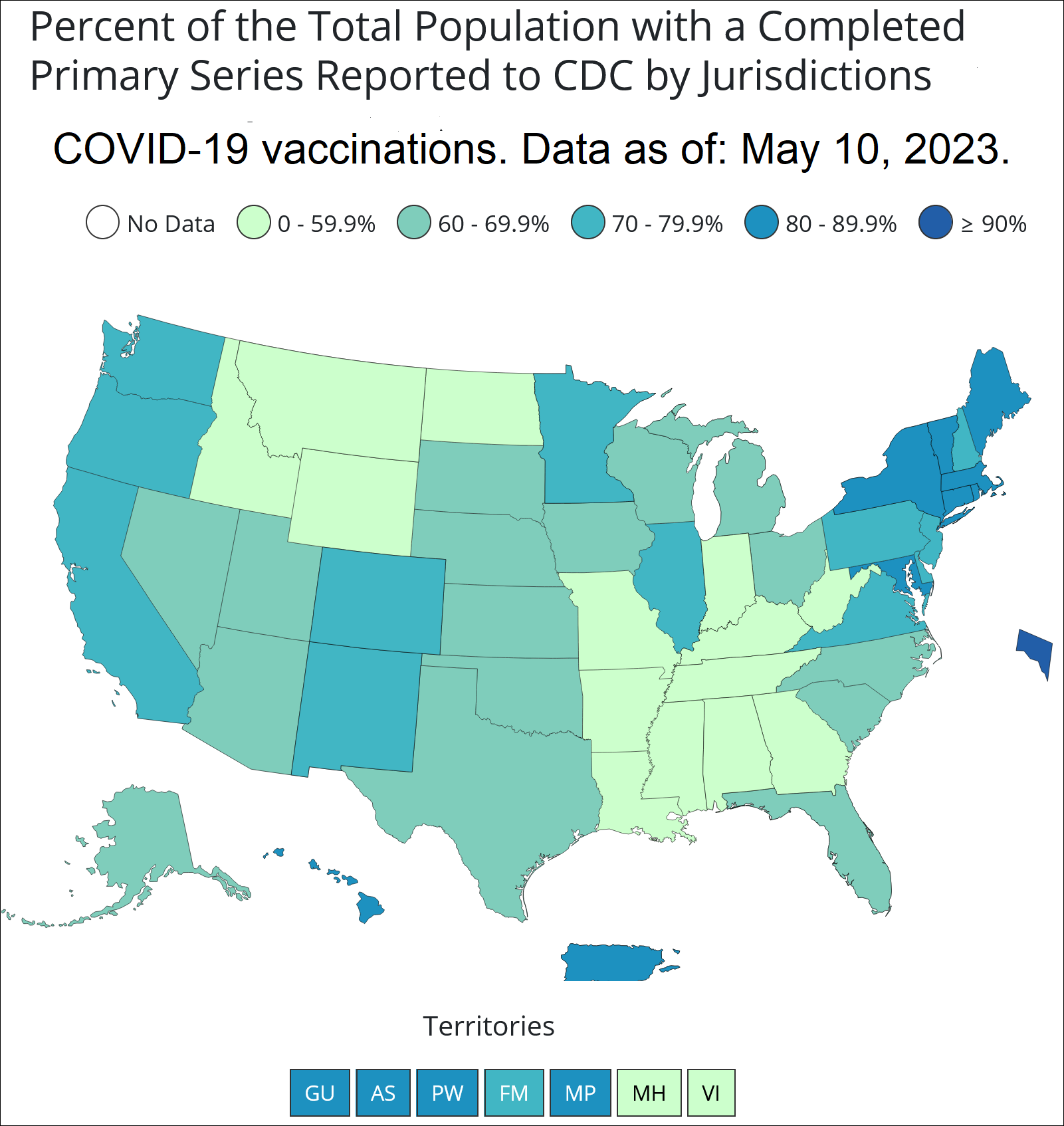

See Commons source for changing sourcing info.

Percentage with at least one vaccination dose

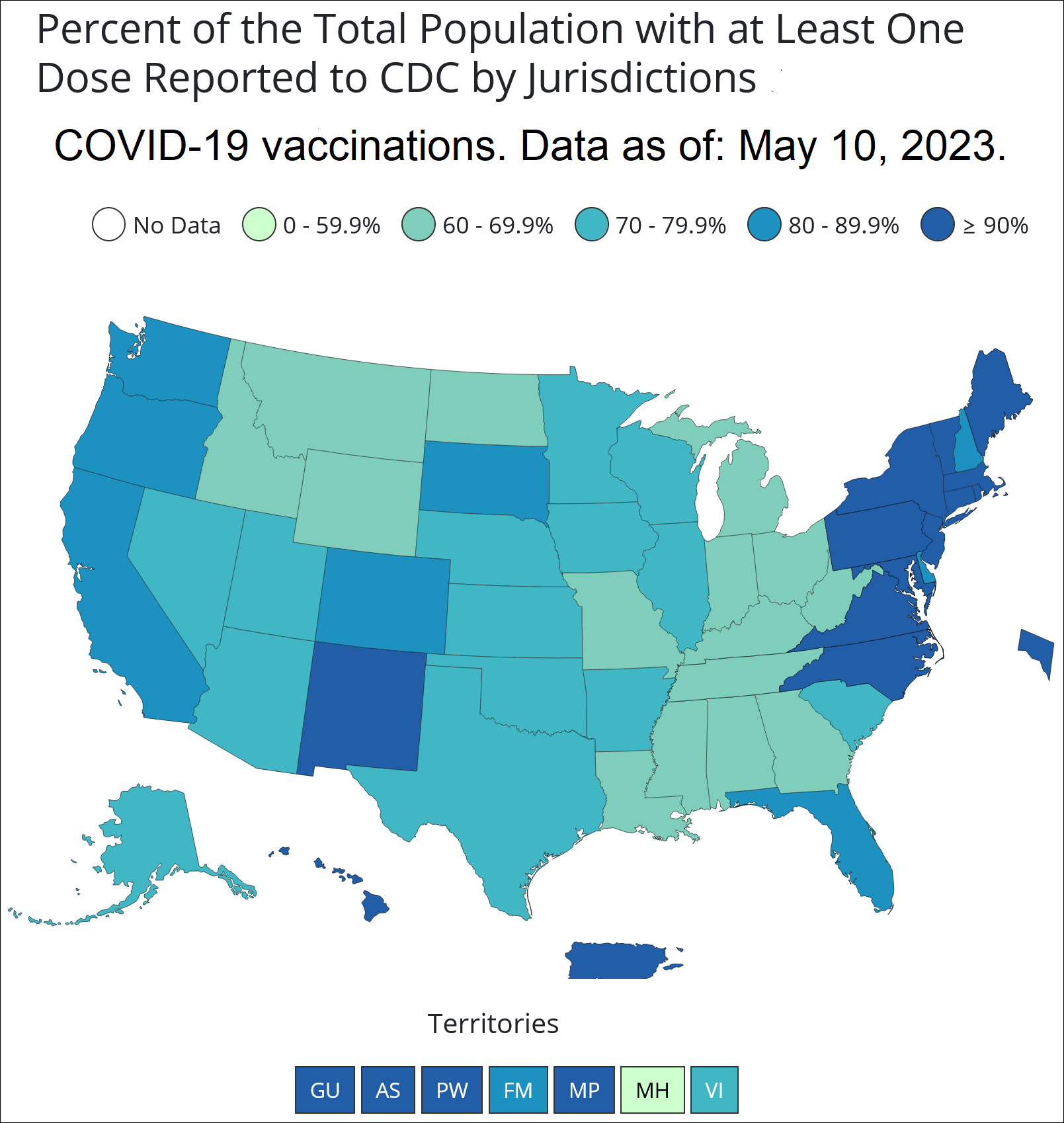

US territories: GU = Guam AS = American Samoa MP = Northern Mariana Islands VI = Virgin Islands Associated states: PW = Republic of Palau FM = Federated States of Micronesia MH = Marshall Islands

The COVID-19 vaccination campaign in the United States was a mass immunization campaign for the COVID-19 pandemic in the United States. The Food and Drug Administration (FDA) first granted emergency use authorization to the Pfizer–BioNTech vaccine on December 10, 2020, and mass vaccinations began four days later. The Moderna vaccine was granted emergency use authorization on December 17, 2020, and the Janssen (Johnson & Johnson) vaccine was granted emergency use authorization on February 27, 2021. It was not until April 19, 2021, that all U.S. states had opened vaccine eligibility to residents aged 16 and over. On May 10, 2021, the FDA approved the Pfizer-BioNTech vaccine for adolescents aged 12 to 15. On August 23, 2021, the FDA granted full approval to the Pfizer–BioNTech vaccine for individuals aged 16 and over.

The U.S. government began the campaign under the presidency of Donald Trump with Operation Warp Speed, a public–private partnership to expedite the development and manufacturing of COVID-19 vaccines. Joe Biden became the new president of the United States on January 20, 2021. Biden had an immediate goal of administering 100 million vaccine doses within his first hundred days in office, and signed an executive order which increased supplies for vaccination. This goal was met on March 19, 2021. On March 25, 2021, he announced he would increase the goal to 200 million within his first 100 days in office. This goal was reached on April 21, 2021.

By July 4, 2021, 67% of the United States' adult population had received at least one dose, just short of a goal of 70%. This goal was met on August 2, 2021. While vaccines have helped significantly reduce the number of new COVID-19 infections nationwide, states with below-average vaccination rates began to see increasing numbers of cases credited to the highly infectious Delta variant by July 2021, which led to an increased push by organizations and companies to begin imposing de facto mandates for their employees be vaccinated for COVID-19.

On September 9, 2021, President Biden announced plans by the federal government to use executive orders and emergency temporary standards enforced by OSHA to mandate the vaccination of all federal branch employees, and require that all companies with more than 100 employees regularly test all employees who are not yet fully vaccinated for COVID-19. On January 26, 2022, OSHA withdrew the vaccine mandate for companies with more than 100 employees due to a ruling from the Supreme Court of the United States that blocked the mandate.

As of November 2022, according to The Commonwealth Fund, COVID-19 vaccination in the United States has prevented an additional 3.2 million deaths, an additional 18.5 million hospitalizations, and an additional 120 million infections from COVID-19. Vaccination has also prevented an additional $899.4 billion in healthcare costs. According to a June 2022 study published in The Lancet, COVID-19 vaccination in the United States prevented an additional 1.9 million deaths from December 8, 2020, to December 8, 2021. According to a July 2022 study published in JAMA Network Open, COVID-19 vaccination in the United States prevented an additional 235,000 deaths, an additional 1.6 million hospitalizations, and an additional 27 million infections from December 1, 2020, to September 30, 2021.

== Vaccination program ==
Timeline of daily COVID-19 vaccine doses administered in the U.S. See the latest date on the timeline at the bottom.

1. Pfizer–BioNTech (381,978,824) (59.4%)
2. Moderna (241,011,491) (37.5%)
3. Johnson & Johnson (18,916,447) (2.94%)
4. Novavax (35,302) (0.01%)
5. Not Identified (690,663) (0.11%)

Vaccines were distributed to states on a population basis, with the vaccine rollouts being administered by each individual U.S. state. The Centers for Disease Control and Prevention suggested that hospital workers and nursing home personnel be the first individuals vaccinated. The subsequent phases of the rollout are determined by each individual state agency.

The CDC has issued cards that can be used to track vaccine progress and serve as a proof of vaccination when required (such as during international travel, or entering a restaurant or workplace). States such as California and New York have offered a digital immunity passport accessible via a mobile app.

=== Eligibility of non-citizens ===
On February 1, 2021, the Department of Homeland Security said it "fully support[s] equal access to the COVID-19 vaccines and vaccine distribution sites for undocumented immigrants" and that related federal agencies "will not conduct enforcement operations at or near vaccine distribution sites or clinics".

States may have intended that vaccines be prioritized for their residents ahead of tourists, but there was some difficulty communicating and enforcing this. Some American adults have no driver's license, and the United States does not automatically provide each citizen with identity documentation in a centralized system. Furthermore, when people did not show up for their vaccine appointments, many clinics vaccinated anyone else who happened to show up so that the doses would not be wasted. As a result, some tourists as well as undocumented immigrants were vaccinated.

As of early February 2021, states including Florida, California, New York, and Texas were specifically trying to restrict "vaccine tourism": brief visits to the U.S. with the primary intention of obtaining a vaccine. However, contrary to rumors that spread on social media, the United States did not have a policy of cancelling visas or imposing fines on tourists who sought vaccination. Diplomats pointed out that the B1/B2 tourist visa allows people to seek medical treatment while within the United States, even if they do not turn out to be eligible for the COVID-19 vaccine.

As of May 13, 2021, according to the Colombian newspaper El Tiempo, the following U.S. states were not requiring foreigners to present proof of residency to receive the vaccine: Alabama, Arizona, California, Colorado, Florida, Iowa, Louisiana, Maryland, Michigan, Minnesota, Missouri, Montana, Nevada, New Hampshire, New Mexico, New York, North Carolina, North Dakota, Ohio, Oklahoma, Pennsylvania, South Carolina, Tennessee, Texas, Virginia, and Wyoming. Thousands of Latin Americans were booking travel to the United States and being vaccinated in the country. Vaccination centers in some U.S. states were accepting foreign passports as valid identification. Travel agencies were advertising "vaccination tourism," and the U.S. embassy in Peru, for example, advised that travelers to the United States could seek vaccination. The governor of Alaska announced that, as of June 1, any international visitor over age 12 could be vaccinated in Alaska and vaccines would be available at airports for convenience.

== Background ==
From early 2020, more than seventy companies worldwide (with five or six operating primarily in the U.S.) began vaccine research. Twenty-eight different vaccines are being worked on and developed using the research provided by those companies. The global competition had national security implications for various countries.

In preparation for large-scale production, Congress set aside more than $3.5 billion for this purpose as part of the CARES Act. Among the labs working on a vaccine is the Walter Reed Army Institute of Research, which has previously studied other infectious diseases, such as HIV/AIDS, ebola, and MERS. By March 18, tests had begun with dozens of volunteers in Seattle, sponsored by the U.S. government, and similar safety trials were planned for other potential vaccines. Bill Gates, whose foundation shifted its focus nearly entirely to the pandemic, anticipated in early 2020 that a vaccine could be ready by early 2021.

On August 5, 2020, the United States agreed to pay Johnson & Johnson more than $1 billion to create a hundred million doses of COVID-19 vaccine. The deal gave the U.S. an option to order an additional two hundred million. The doses were supposed to be provided for free to Americans if they are used in a COVID-19 vaccination campaign.

On August 31, 2020, the Centers for Disease Control and Prevention (CDC) released their outline for how the COVID-19 vaccine would be administered and distributed across the entire country.

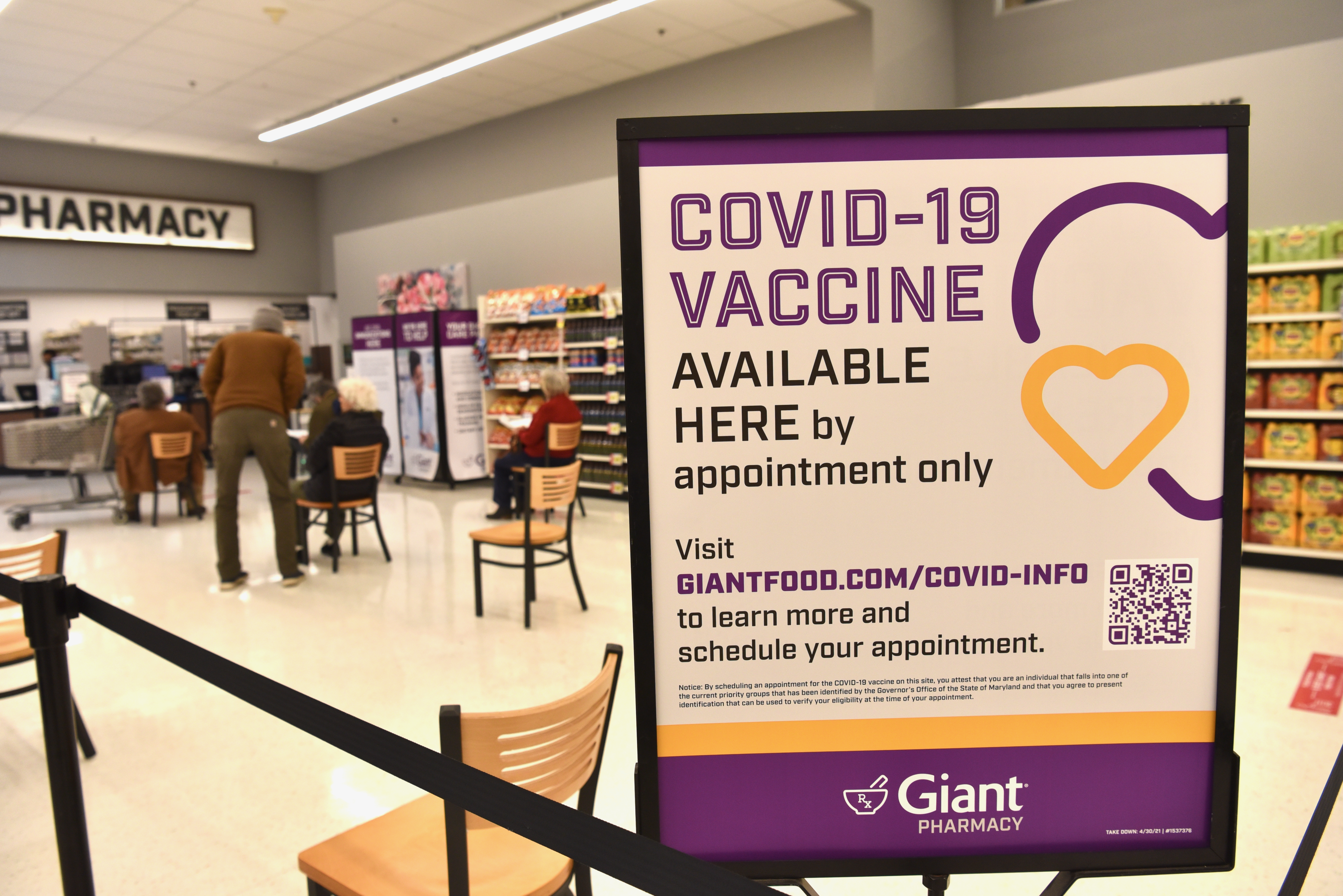
Senior citizens await COVID-19 vaccine at a Maryland pharmacy in January 2021.

BIO, a trade group of all COVID-19 vaccine makers except AstraZeneca, tried to persuade Secretary Azar to publish strict FDA guidelines that would help ensure the safety and public uptake of the vaccine. Politics impacted scientific practice, however, when chief of staff Mark Meadows blocked the FDA when it was realized that the timing of the provisions would make it impossible for a vaccine to be authorized before the November election. Ultimately, the guidelines emerged from the Office of Management and Budget and were published on the FDA website.

As of October 2020, 44 were in clinical trials on humans, and 91 pre-clinical vaccines were being tested on animals. Most of these trials were underway.

On November 20, 2020, the Pfizer–BioNTech partnership submitted a request for emergency use authorization (EUA) to the Food and Drug Administration (FDA), and the FDA announced that its Vaccines and Related Biological Products Advisory Committee (VRBPAC) would review the request. An EUA is a mechanism under the Pandemic and All-Hazards Preparedness Reauthorization Act of 2013 that permits products not yet fully approved by the FDA to be used as part of an existing state of emergency.

On December 11, the FDA granted emergency use authorization for the Pfizer–BioNTech vaccine. An initial shipment of 2.9 million doses were scheduled to be distributed rapidly, and Pfizer promised to continue supplying the rest of the hundred million doses through March 2021. Pfizer had adequate stocks available and began this distribution on December 17, 2020, but the federal government reduced the amount Pfizer was allowed to distribute.

On December 18, 2020, the FDA granted the Moderna vaccine emergency use authorization, which Moderna had requested on November 30, 2020. The U.S. planned to rapidly distribute 5.9 million doses with more to come later.

Despite his involvement in spurring their development via Operation Warp Speed, Trump largely downplayed vaccines during his final months in office, and both Trump and First Lady Melania Trump received the vaccine in private before Joe Biden took office as the new president in January 2021.

On February 27, 2021, the Janssen COVID-19 vaccine was granted emergency use authorization by the FDA for use. However, this vaccine has faced backlash from some government officials, believing it to be not as effective as Pfizer or Moderna. On March 5, the mayor of Detroit, Mike Duggan, rejected a shipment of the Janssen vaccine, saying, "Moderna and Pfizer are the best. And I am going to do everything I can to make sure the residents of the city of Detroit get the best." After backlash, Duggan declared he would no longer decline the vaccine.

On March 11, 2021, President Biden announced that he would direct all states to make vaccines available to all adults no later than May 1. On April 6 he said he would direct states to make all adults eligible for vaccination by April 19. This deadline was met after several states opened up vaccination to everyone 16 and above the same day.

On March 26, 2021, Ocugen submitted its master file for Covaxin a conventional inactivated vaccine to the FDA. In June the FDA suggested that the company go the longer route to gain full FDA approval instead of emergency use authorization.

As of May 2021, most experts thought the United States would be unable to achieve herd immunity, at least in the near term, given insufficient demand for the vaccines. On that note, many sources are saying the new variants last longer than 14 days, such as those found at home and abroad.

On July 6, Biden announced plans for more targeted outreach in order to reach under-vaccinated populations, such as shifting from larger mass clinics to having wider availability at community locations and events, and going "neighborhood by neighborhood, and oftentimes, door to door—literally knocking on doors—to get help to the remaining people protected from the virus"

On July 16, the FDA approved a request by Pfizer to give its vaccine a priority review designation, meaning that final approval of the vaccine would be pursued on an expedited timetable. While priority review processes usually take up to six months, it was expected that the Pfizer vaccine may be approved within weeks. On August 23, the FDA announced that it had formally approved the Pfizer vaccine for individuals 16 and over. It remains subject to EUA for individuals aged 12 to 15.

=== Incentives ===
A public survey, published 15 December 2020, reported around 25% of the Americans replying they “probably or definitely would not get a COVID-19 vaccine even if it were available for free and deemed safe by scientists”. Efforts have been made by private businesses and civic entities to help encourage vaccination. Incentives were promoted via local news, ads, government outreach, and apps. Incentives included time off from work, providing childcare and similar services, ridesharing services offering free transport to vaccine clinic sites, and promotional incentives and discounts being offered to those who present proof of a recent vaccination.

Free items included beer, pizza, crawfish, donuts, and french fries. Some sports teams established partnerships to offer vaccine clinics at their venues on game days, with free tickets to games offered to those who use the clinics. Free cannabis was available in Washington State when getting a vaccine at a dispensary.

Massachusetts ran a free lottery for fully vaccinated people, and gave out $6.5 million to ten people in the form of cash and scholarships. Ohio ran a similar lottery, Maine gave away hunting licenses, and West Virginia gave away $100 savings bonds.

=== Vaccines in order ===
Vaccine	Submitted (EUA)	Emergency use Authorization	Deployment	Submitted (Full)	Full Approval
Pfizer–BioNTech	November 20, 2020	December 11, 2020	December 14, 2020	May 7, 2021	August 23, 2021
Moderna	November 30, 2020	December 17, 2020	December 21, 2020	June 1, 2021	January 31, 2022
Janssen	February 4, 2021	February 27, 2021	March 1, 2021	No	No
Novavax	January 31, 2022	July 19, 2022 (ages 18+)	August 1, 2022	No	No
Covaxin	March 26, 2021 (ages 18+); November 5, 2021 (ages 2–18)	Pending	No	No	No
Astrazeneca	—N/a	—N/a	No	No	No
Sanofi–GSK	No	No	No	No	No

=== Vaccine administration ===
 Listed in millions,

As of September 7, 2023

- Pfizer–BioNTech
- Moderna
- Janssen
- Novavax
- Pfizer-BioNTech bivalent booster
- Moderna bivalent booster
- Not Identified

=== Vaccine deliveries ===
 Listed in millions,

As of September 7, 2023

- Pfizer–BioNTech
- Moderna
- Janssen
- Novavax
- Pfizer-BioNTech bivalent booster
- Moderna bivalent booster

=== Booster doses ===
1. Unvaccinated population: ~66.8 million people (20.1%)
2. Population who have received only one dose of a two-dose vaccine: 38,910,734 (11.7%)
3. Population who are fully vaccinated, but haven't received an additional booster shot: 115,364,980 (34.8%)
4. Population who are fully vaccinated and received an additional booster shot: 85,212,292 (25.7%)
5. Population who are fully vaccinated and received two additional booster shots: 25,623,483 (7.72%)

On August 12, 2021, the FDA amended the EUA for the Moderna and Pfizer vaccines in order to allow a third, booster dose for patients who are immunocompromised or have received organ transplants. Director of the CDC Rochelle Walensky stated in a press briefing that "certain people who are immune compromised, such as people who have had an organ transplant and some cancer patients, may not have had an adequate immune response to just two doses of the [vaccine]." In an interview with Today, Director of the National Institute of Allergy and Infectious Diseases (NIAID) Anthony Fauci stated that "inevitably, there will be a time when we'll have to give boosts [to the general public]. What we're doing literally on a weekly and monthly basis is following cohorts of patients to determine if, when and whom should get it. But right now at this moment, other than the immune compromised, we're not going to be giving boosters to people." The World Health Organization (WHO) discourages the use of booster shots for COVID-19 in developed countries, as they would divert supplies away from the unvaccinated.

On August 18, 2021, Walensky and acting Commissioner of the FDA Janet Woodcock released a joint statement indicating that, pending FDA approval, booster doses for the Moderna and Pfizer vaccines could become generally available by the week of September 20, for those who had received their second dose at least eight months prior. They stated that that protection against severe outcomes or death "could diminish in the months ahead, especially among those who are at higher risk or were vaccinated during the earlier phases of the vaccination rollout", such as health care workers and seniors.

On September 17, 2021, the FDA Vaccines and Related Biological Products Advisory Committee voted unanimously against recommending that booster doses of the Pfizer vaccine be distributed to the general public, citing the lack of evidence that a third dose is safe for younger populations. On September 23, Walensky officially approved the distribution of Pfizer booster doses to certain populations six months after their second dose, including those who are 65 and over, those with underlying conditions, and those who work in high-risk settings. On October 14, 2021, the committee recommended a half-dose booster for the Moderna vaccine among the same populations.

The next day, the committee also recommended that a second dose be generally distributed for the Janssen vaccine, at least two months after the first. An FDA analysis cited that a single dose of the vaccine had a consistently lower efficacy in comparison to the mRNA vaccines.

== Timeline ==
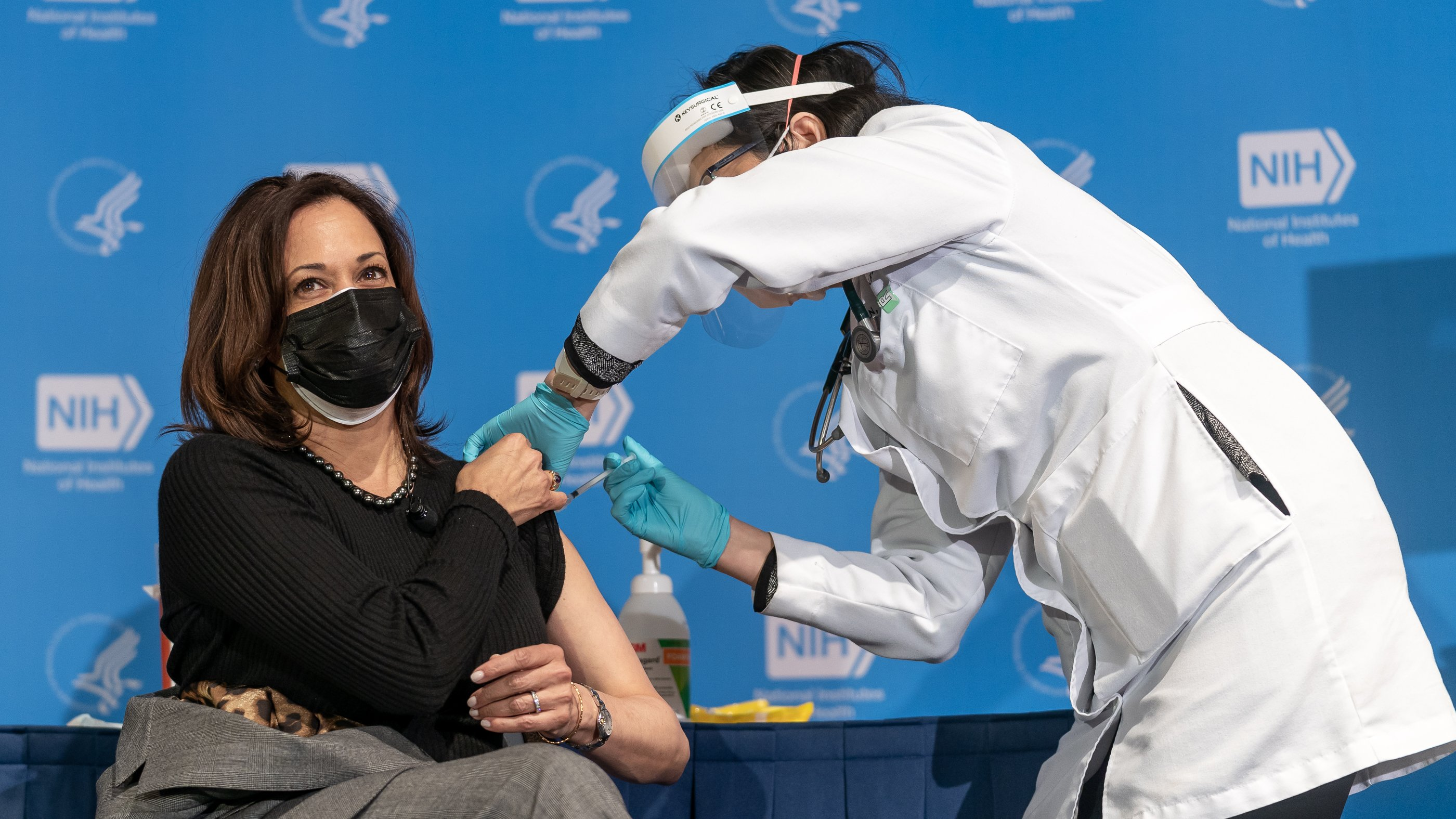
Vice President Elect Kamala Harris, like many other public officials, was vaccinated on-camera.

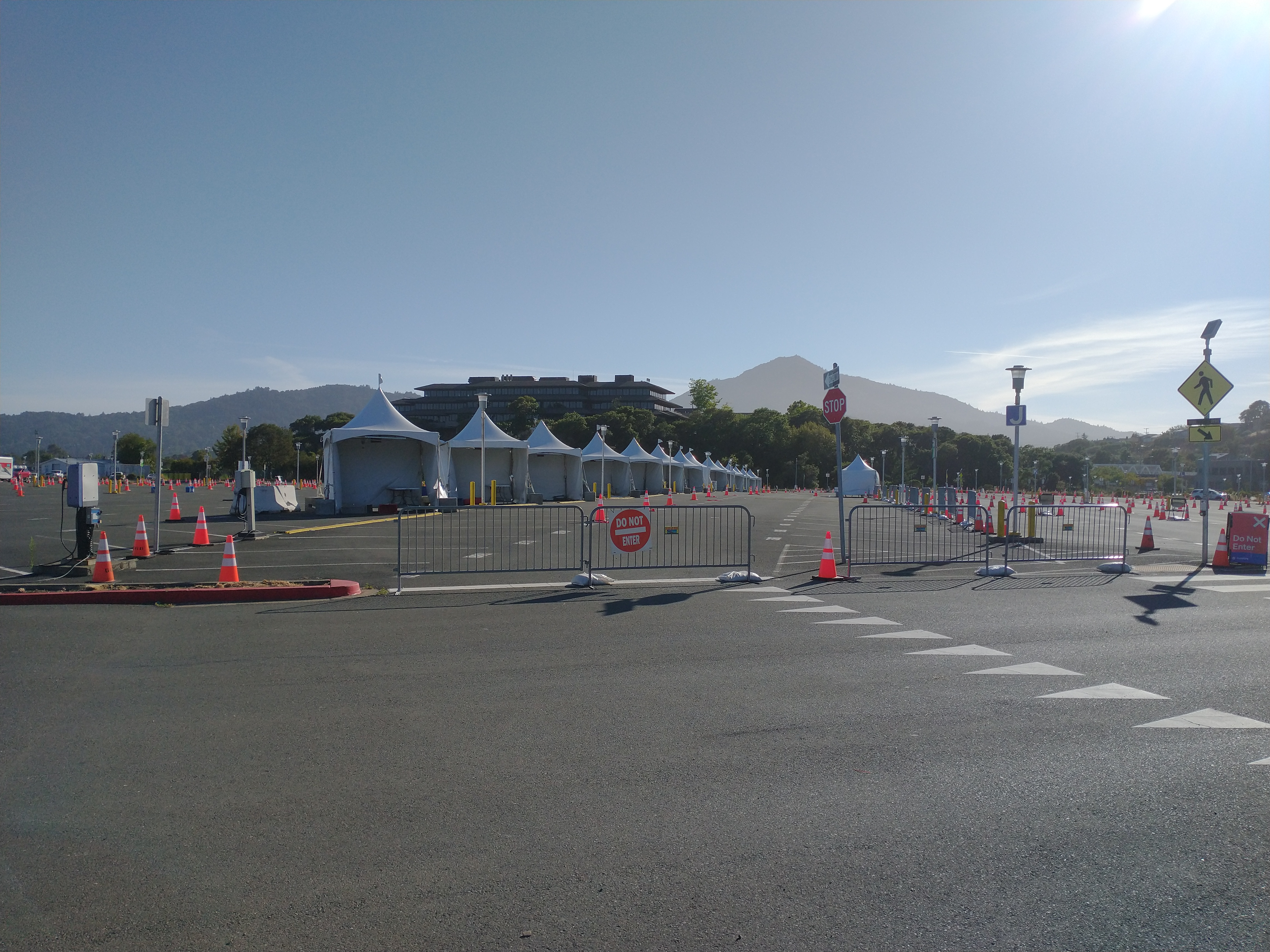
Drive-through vaccination site at the Larkspur Ferry Terminal in Larkspur, California

=== December 2020 ===
On December 10, 2020, the FDA granted emergency use to the Pfizer vaccine. On December 14, 2020, the first vaccine doses were administered. Sandra Lindsay of Queens, New York City, was the first American to be administered an FDA-authorized COVID-19 vaccine. The Moderna vaccine was granted emergency use authorization three days later, on December 17.

On December 21, President-elect Joe Biden publicly received his first dose of the Pfizer vaccine during a media event at Christiana Hospital in Delaware. The event was intended as a means by the incoming Biden administration to boost public confidence in the vaccines. Biden stated that Trump "deserve[d] some credit getting this off the ground with Operation Warp Speed", and told the press "It's going to take time, and in the meantime—I don't want to sound a sour note here—but I hope people listen to all the experts." Vice President-elect Kamala Harris received her first dose of the Moderna vaccine on December 29, also in public.

=== March 2021 ===
On March 12, 2021, the United States surpassed 100 million doses administered.

Over the course of the month, seven states (Arkansas, Mississippi, Ohio, Connecticut, Arizona, Texas, and Georgia) made the vaccine available to all adults, following a period of selective vaccination for elderly and other vulnerable populations. California and Washington announced that all adults would be eligible for a vaccine starting April 15. Indiana announced that it would make vaccines available to university students and would specifically facilitate the transfer of vaccines to university-based vaccine clinics, including one such clinic at the University of Notre Dame. On Day 58 (March 19) of the Biden administration, it achieved its goal of administering 100 million doses within its first 100 days. On March 25, the administration set a new goal of administering 200 million doses in its first 100 days.

=== April 2021 ===
On April 3, more than four million doses of the COVID-19 vaccine were reported administered in the past 24 hours, setting a new record and bringing the seven-day average to more than three million a day. As of April 11, more than 187 million vaccine doses have been administered. On April 13, the CDC and FDA issued a statement recommending a pause in the use of the Johnson & Johnson vaccine "out of an abundance of caution" after six women aged 18 through 48 developed a rare and severe type of blood clot called cerebral venous sinus thrombosis; on April 23, the recommended pause was lifted. By April 19, all U.S. states had made Americans aged 16 and older eligible for vaccination.

On April 22, the Biden administration announced that it had achieved its new goal of 200 million vaccine doses administered within its first 100 days. As of April 28, the CDC reported an average of 2.7 million daily vaccinations over the past week.

=== May 2021 ===
On May 4, 2021, Biden announced a new target of having at least 70% of U.S. adults receive one vaccine dose by July 4.

On May 10, 2021, the FDA granted emergency use authorization for the Pfizer vaccine for use on adolescents aged 12–15, making the United States the second country in the world, after Canada, to do so. On May 12, Director of the CDC Rochelle Walensky approved the recommendation. On May 25, the Biden administration announced that 50% of adults had been fully vaccinated.

=== June 2021 ===
By June 2021, the pace of vaccination had begun to decrease, amid increasing spread of the highly-infectious Delta variant across the country. On June 3, the White House announced additional private-sector partnerships in order to expand targeted outreach and vaccine availability, including an initiative to promote and offer vaccines through Black-owned barber shops throughout June, and a partnership with brewery Anheuser-Busch—who pledged in a promotional campaign to offer a "free beer" to all adults over 21 if the country met Biden's 70% goal.

The United States passed 600,000 Covid deaths on Tuesday, June 15, more than 200 times higher than the number of lives lost during the attacks of September 11, 2001. By late-June, one-quarter of COVID-19 cases in the U.S. were attributable to the Delta variant. Dr. Fauci warned that vaccination disparities could lead to "two Americas" where less vaccinated U.S. populations were at much higher risk of COVID-19.

=== July 2021 ===
The U.S. missed Biden's 70% goal by approximately three million residents, or 3%. Only 18 states reached the 70% goal among their local population. Generally, the goal was met for adults 27 and over, but not for younger populations. By early-July 2021, the number of daily COVID-19 cases in the U.S. had declined by around 90% since the peak in January. However, cases had also begun to increase in parts of the country with below-average vaccination rates, and hesitancy towards the vaccine had become a partisan issue: a poll by The Washington Post and ABC News found that 86% of self-identified Democrats surveyed had received at least one dose, as opposed to 45% of self-identified Republicans, the 18 states that did reach 70% of first doses by July 4 were all won by Biden during the 2020 election, and a July 8 report by KFF found that the average vaccination rate in counties that voted for Biden was growing in comparison to those that voted for Trump.

Anti-vaccination rhetoric increased among conservatives, including Republican politicians and right-wing media outlets (such as Fox News and Newsmax) promoting misinformation and conspiracy theories (such as falsely claiming that the Biden administration would impose mandatory door-to-door vaccination—an exaggeration of Biden's recently announced plans for targeted outreach), Republican lawmakers attempting to inhibit vaccine outreach, and state laws to prohibit "discrimination" against the unvaccinated (which effectively ban vaccine mandates).

On July 15, Surgeon General Vivek Murthy warned that health-related misinformation was a public health threat. The next day, President Biden accused social networking service Facebook of "killing people" by enabling the spread of vaccine misinformation. On July 19, after criticism from Facebook over the comments, Biden stated that they were based on a report suggesting that approximately 12 social media users were responsible for at least 60% of vaccine misinformation, and clarified that "Facebook isn't killing people, these 12 people are out there giving misinformation. Anyone listening to it is getting hurt by it. It's killing people. It's bad information". He went on to explain that "My hope is that Facebook, instead of taking it personally that somehow I'm saying Facebook is killing people, that they would do something about the misinformation, the outrageous misinformation about the vaccine".

In late-July, amid increasing COVID-19 hospitalizations in a number of Republican-led states, some Republican politicians became more vocal in promoting vaccination, including Senate Minority Leader Mitch McConnell, Senator of Texas John Cornyn, and former Surgeon General Jerome Adams. Governor of Florida Ron DeSantis—who has been critical of Fauci and COVID-19 restrictions—stated in a press appearance that vaccines were "saving lives" and "reducing mortality" (citing the majority of hospitalizations being unvaccinated individuals), while criticizing mask mandates as displaying a lack of confidence in the efficacy of vaccines. McConnell used campaign funds to purchase radio advertisements in his home state of Kentucky to promote vaccination; the ad features McConnell discussing his childhood battle with Polio, and stating that the development of multiple safe and effective COVID-19 vaccines in such a short time was "nothing short of a modern medical miracle", in comparison to the "decades" it took to develop a Polio vaccine.

A number of conservative commentators also abruptly made statements in support of vaccination, including Fox News hosts Steve Doocy and Sean Hannity during broadcasts of Fox & Friends and Hannity respectively, Newsmax CEO and Trump confidant Christopher Ruddy (who praised Biden in an op-ed for "making a huge dent" in the pandemic by embracing and prioritizing the rollout of the "effective vaccine" inherited from the Trump presidency), and conservative commentator Ben Shapiro. However, Hannity subsequently walked back his remarks on his radio show and Hannity, arguing that he never urged his viewers to get the vaccine, and adding the caveat that they should get the vaccine "if it's right for you", after doing "all of your research" and speaking with medical professionals that they trust.

On July 26, 2021, a number of organizations announced that they would mandate the vaccination of their employees, including the American Medical Association and American Nurses Association, and frontline health care workers of the Department of Veterans Affairs. California and New York City announced that all government employees would be subject to weekly testing if they are not vaccinated.

On July 29, President Biden similarly announced that unvaccinated federal employees and on-site contractors will be subject to mandatory social distancing, masks, weekly or bi-weekly COVID-19 testing, and limitations on work travel. Biden cited Delta variant and a "pandemic of the unvaccinated" as justification for the measures. He also announced that the federal government planned to use funds from the American Rescue Plan to reimburse small and medium-sized businesses for paid time off for employee vaccine appointments (similar to paid time off provided for voting in elections), and called for states to offer $100 payments to the newly vaccinated using American Rescue Plan funding as an "extra incentive to boost vaccination rates, protect communities, and save lives." Biden stated that "I know that paying people to get vaccinated might sound unfair to folks that have gotten vaccinated already but here's the deal: if incentives help us beat this virus, I believe we should use them."

=== August 2021 ===
On August 1, the CDC reported that there had been a 24% week-over-week increase in the number of first doses administered, especially in states with lower vaccination rates. As of August 2, at least 70% of U.S. adults had received at least one vaccine dose. On August 6, the CDC reported that half of the U.S. population has been fully vaccinated. Several major cities announced or approved plans to restrict access to non-essential indoor locations such as cinemas, restaurants, and other entertainment venues, to those who are vaccinated.

The FDA gave full approval to the Pfizer-BioNTech vaccine on August 23 for patients 16 and older, prompting President Biden to encourage those who had been waiting for full approval to get vaccinated. Anthony Fauci projected that at least 20% of unvaccinated Americans "will now step forward and get vaccinated" due to the approval. With the approval, it was also announced that the Department of Defense was preparing guidance requiring the vaccination of military members for COVID-19, with press secretary John Kirby stating that this would "ensure the safety of our service members and promote the readiness of our force, not to mention the health and safety of the communities around the country in which we live."

=== October 2021 ===
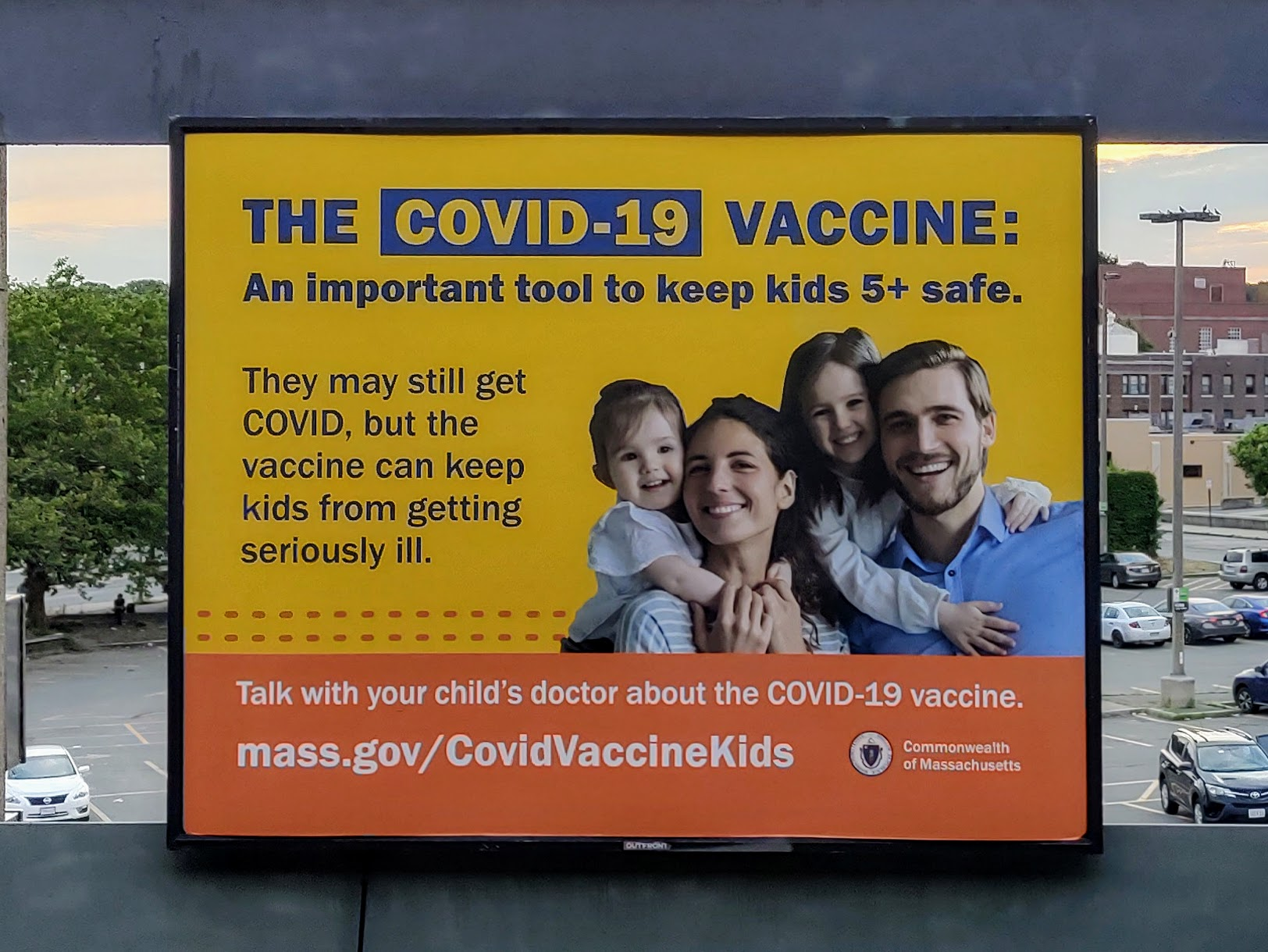
A poster on a Massachusetts train station offering COVID-19 vaccines for children 5 through 11 years of age.

On October 20, the White House said it had enough Pfizer-BioNTech pediatric vaccine for every child in the country aged 5–11 and that it expected federal health officials to approve the vaccine within weeks, upon which approval the White House planned to begin distributing the doses. Dr. Fauci said on October 24 that it seemed likely that the FDA might approve the vaccine for distribution in early November. On October 29, 2021, The U.S. Food and Drug Administration authorized the emergency use of the Pfizer-BioNTech COVID-19 Vaccine for children 5 through 11 years of age. Vice President Harris received her booster shot of the Moderna vaccine on October 30.

=== February 2022 ===
A study which examined a potential causal link between COVID-19 vaccines and excess deaths found that out of more than 250 million Americans vaccinated only 55 cases of death after COVID-19 vaccination were reported and in 17 of these a causal relationship had been excluded.

=== June 2022 ===
On June 18, the CDC recommended vaccines for children as young as 6 months, with a rollout of these vaccines beginning the week after.

=== May 2025 ===
On May 27, in accordance with the views of new Secretary of Health and Human Services Robert F. Kennedy Jr., the CDC ended its recommendation of COVID-19 vaccines for healthy children of any age, and pregnant women. Kennedy cited "a lack of any clinical data to support the repeat booster strategy in children".

=== July 2025 ===
On July 16, the American College of Obstetricians and Gynecologists issued a statement contradicting the updated CDC guidelines, maintaining its current recommendations prior to the May 27 CDC changes, and following the Vaccine Integrity Project for the upcoming guidelines.

=== August 2025 ===
On August 19, diverging from the updated CDC guidelines, the American Academy of Pediatrics recommended the COVID-19 vaccines to children from 6 months through 23 months of age and also for specific risk groups from 2 to 18 years old. Furthermore, parents or guardians can ask for the vaccines for their children ages 2 to 18 who are outside of the above groups.

On August 27, 2025, Kennedy Jr. announced that the FDA had granted approval to the most recent versions of the Moderna, Novovax, and Pfizer vaccines, but rescinded the Emergency Use Authorization and restricted their availability to people 65 and up, and young adults with at least one high-risk condition.

== Vaccination mandates ==
Over the course of the COVID-19 pandemic, COVID-19 vaccine mandates have been enacted by numerous states and municipalities in the United States, and also by private entities. In September 2021, President Joe Biden announced that the federal government would take steps to mandate COVID-19 vaccination for certain entities under the authority of the federal government or federal agencies. Most federal mandates thus imposed were either overturned through litigation, or withdrawn by the administration, although a mandate on health care workers in institutions receiving Medicare and Medicaid funds was upheld.

All federal mandates were lifted when the national emergency was declared to have ended in May 2023. A small number of states have gone in the opposite direction, through executive orders or legislation designed to limit vaccination mandates.

== Vaccinations by state and territory ==
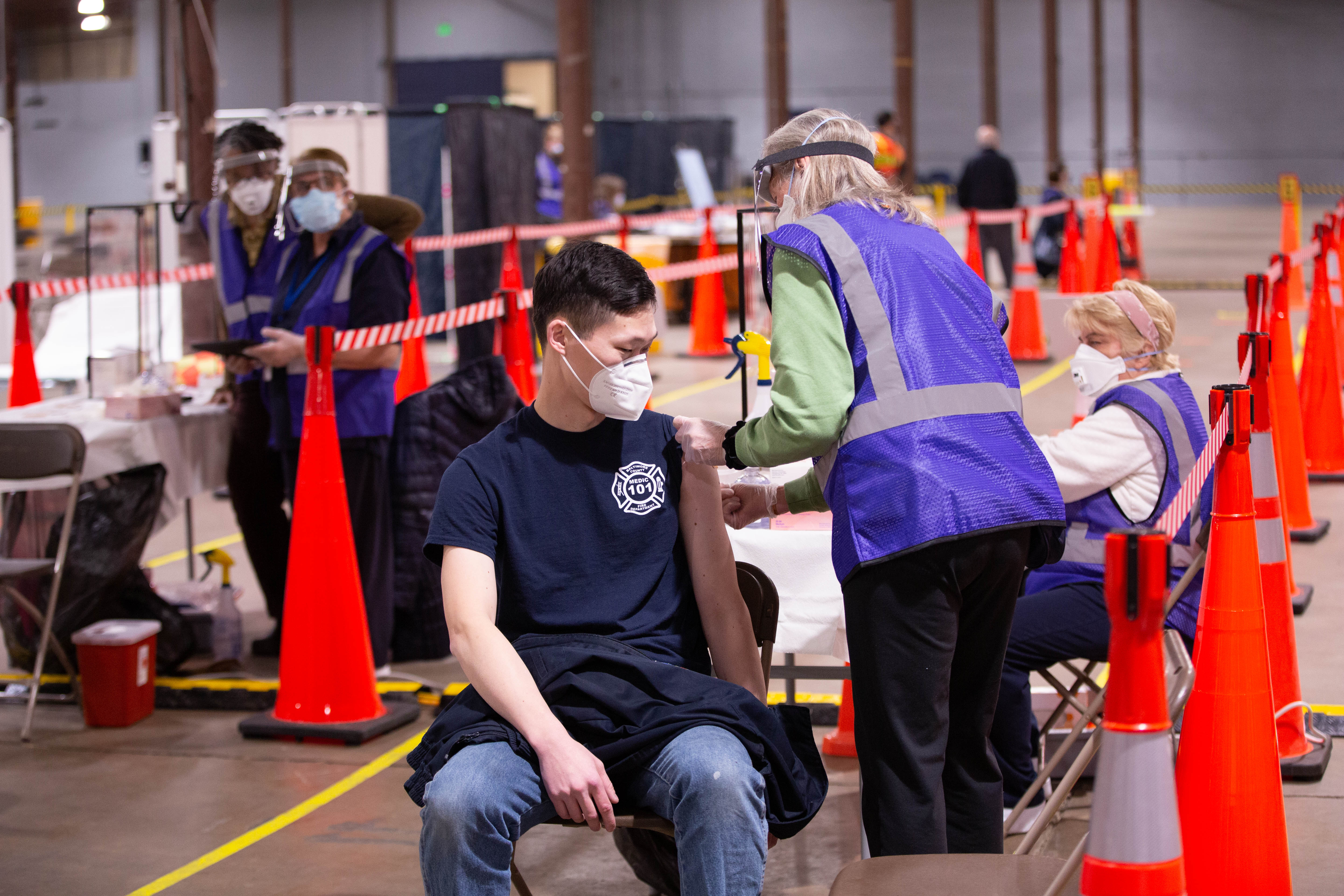

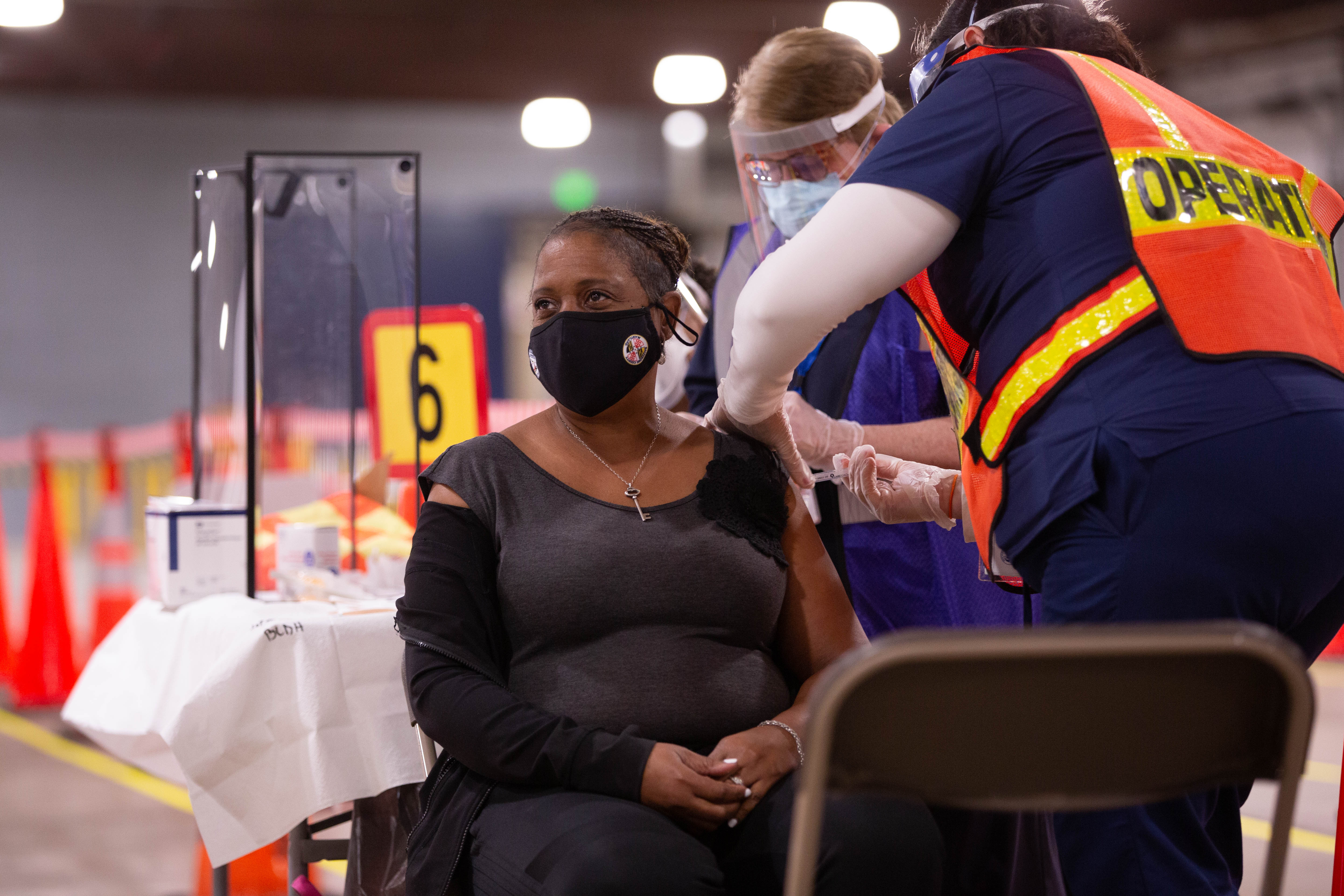

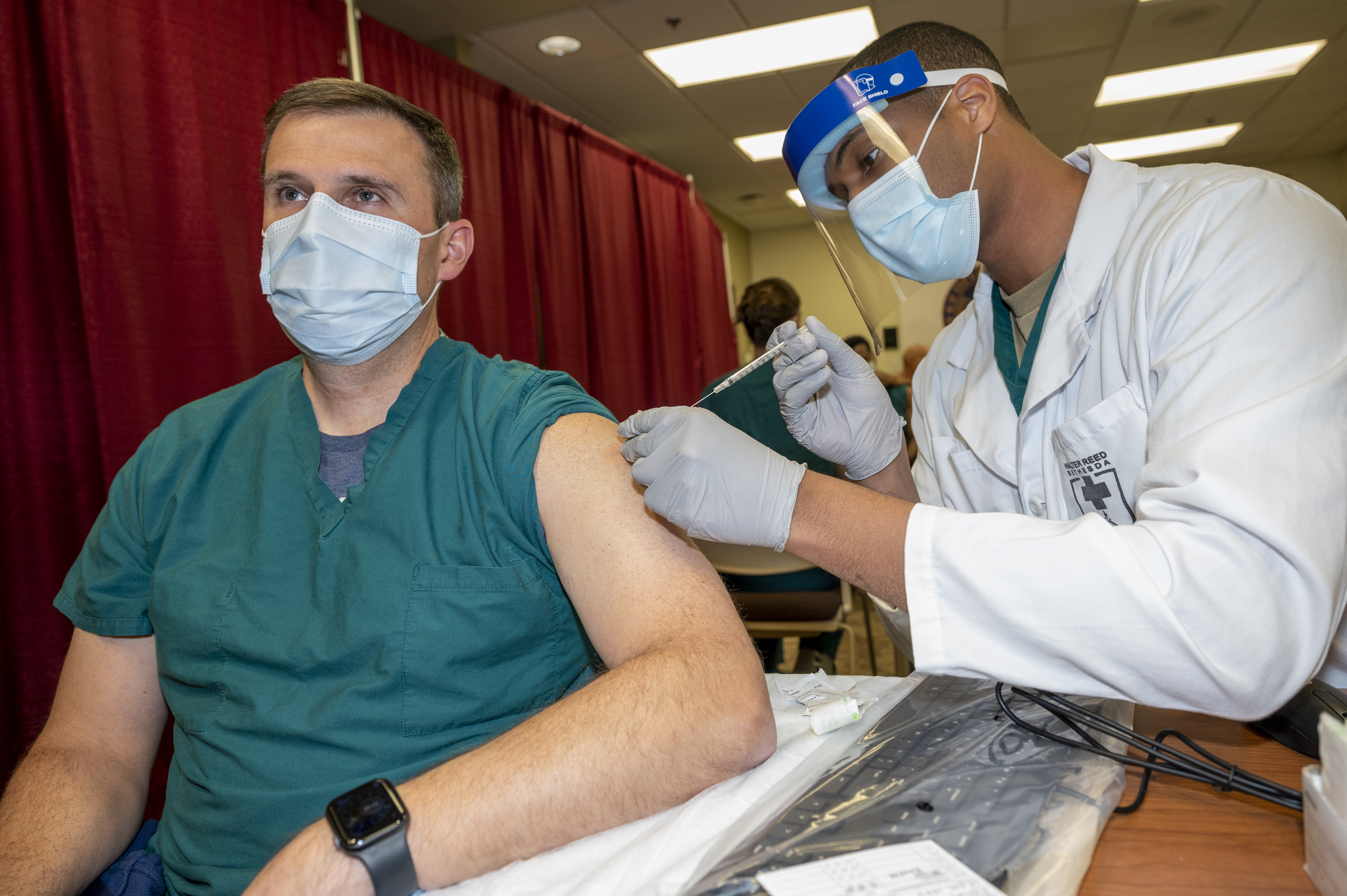

Number of people who have received at least one dose of a COVID-19 vaccine. Also, the percentage by state or territory. As of June 3, 2022.
State/Territory	Vaccinated	% of pop.
Alabama	3,090,117	63%
Alaska	512,683	70.1%
Arizona	5,361,796	73.7%
Arkansas	2,024,120	67.1%
California	32,605,347	82.5%
Colorado	4,593,119	79.8%
Connecticut	3,433,007	95%
Delaware	815,451	83.7%
Florida	17,138,353	79.8%
Georgia	6,980,368	65.7%
Hawaii	1,243,635	87.8%
Idaho	1,107,825	62%
Illinois	9,708,189	76.6%
Indiana	4,157,548	61.8%
Iowa	2,151,825	68.2%
Kansas	2,181,870	74.9%
Kentucky	2,968,456	66.4%
Louisiana	2,848,292	61.3%
Maine	1,226,747	91.3%
Maryland	5,260,427	87%
Massachusetts	6,829,570	95%
Michigan	6,717,817	67.3%
Minnesota	4,253,011	75.4%
Mississippi	1,782,209	59.9%
Missouri	4,081,989	66.5%
Montana	700,374	65.5%
Nebraska	1,364,224	70.5%
Nevada	2,332,395	75.7%
New Hampshire	1,210,143	89%
New Jersey	8,079,293	91%
New Mexico	1,853,965	88.4%
New York	17,636,744	90.7%
North Carolina	8,925,348	85.1%
North Dakota	502,017	65.9%
Ohio	7,466,872	63.9%
Oklahoma	2,829,476	71.5%
Oregon	3,301,377	78.3%
Pennsylvania	10,953,487	85.6%
Rhode Island	1,054,432	95%
South Carolina	3,504,526	68.1%
South Dakota	683,077	77.2%
Tennessee	4,266,051	62.5%
Texas	21,403,595	73.8%
Utah	2,321,276	72.4%
Vermont	587,103	94.1%
Virginia	7,361,040	86.2%
Washington	6,183,446	81.2%
West Virginia	1,170,466	65.3%
Wisconsin	4,200,761	72.1%
Wyoming	337,550	58.3%
50 states	253,302,809	?%
American Samoa	45,415	95%
District of Columbia	722,457	95%
Guam	154,504	91.7%
Northern Mariana Islands	45,593	87.9%
Puerto Rico	3,044,677	95%
US Virgin Islands	70,350	66.2%
U.S. territories	4,082,996	?%
United States	257,385,805	?%
Marshall Islands	36,481	46.9%
Micronesia	69,545	68%
Palau	20,439	94.9%
Compact of Free Association	126,465	?%
USA + CoFA	257,512,270	?%

=== Vaccinations in the U.S. military ===
On August 9, 2021, all servicemembers received a memo explaining that, under a plan endorsed by President Biden and by military leadership, COVID-19 vaccination would become mandatory within about a month. About a third of active U.S. military service members had already been vaccinated as of late April; and about two-thirds (73% of all service members) had already been vaccinated by the time the memo was sent.

The U.S. Navy had been the fastest to begin vaccination in early 2021. As of April 22, 2021, considering active military personnel who had received at least one dose, the U.S. Navy had the highest percentage at 51%, the Marines at 36%, the Air Force/Space Force at 34%, and the Army at 27%. By late May 2021, at least 58% of active military personnel had received at least one dose of the COVID-19 vaccine.

As of April 9, 2021, 39% of U.S. Marines to whom the military offered the vaccine had refused it. The highest rate of refusal was at Camp Lejeune in North Carolina, where 57% of Marines had refused the vaccine.

On August 23, 2021, the Pfizer-BioTech vaccine got its full FDA approval, prompting vaccinations to be required for all active duty, reserve, and National Guard troops starting August 25. By the time the vaccination requirement order was sent out, only 68% of active-duty troops were fully vaccinated.

On September 1, 2021, the U.S. Navy mandated vaccination of all active-duty Navy sailors and U.S. Marines by November 28 and of reservists by December 28. On September 3, 2021, the U.S. Air Force mandated vaccination of all active-duty airmen and U.S. Space Force Guardians by November 2, while Air Force reservists had until December 2. On September 14, 2021, the U.S. Army mandated vaccination of all active duty soldiers by December 15 and of reservists by June 30, 2022.

=== Vaccine certificates ===
The U.S. does not issue a federally mandated COVID-19 certificate nor a digital proof that would allow venues to check the vaccine status of participants consistently. CDC vaccine cards that contain personal information including patient numbers and place of vaccinations are accepted in those European countries where American military personnel are stationed. However, those cards are not immediately transferrable to EU Digital COVID Certificates since CDC cards are not digitally validated and do not contain a counterfeit-proof or unique identifier. Asian countries have similar health certificate requirements for entering their territories. The lack of a federal system for checking COVID-19 status has put the United States in a disadvantage compared to nations in Europe and Asia.

== Public opinion ==
The Kaiser Family Foundation conducts ongoing polling and analysis in a project called the KFF COVID-19 Vaccine Monitor. It considers demographics including age, race, political party, education, and insurance status when examining vaccine hesitancy. A KFF study in December 2020 showed that 27% of the general public, and 29% of health careworkers, were hesitant to be vaccinated.

In December 2020 a Gallup poll found that 63% of Americans were willing to receive the COVID-19 vaccine.

Safety concerns about the vaccines are a primary factor in vaccine hesitancy and refusal. Most unvaccinated adults are not confident in the safety of the vaccines. While 63% of parents are confident that the vaccines are safe for adults, only about half of those who are confident in safety for adults are confident they are safe for ages 12–17 and it is further reduced for even younger age groups. The need for more research for the vaccines is the most stated reason given by parents for not wanting to have their child vaccinated.

Political leanings are reflected in vaccine hesitancy. Early in the pandemic, before vaccines were available, a poll conducted May 20–21, 2020, found that 44% of Republicans and 19% of Democrats believed a debunked conspiracy theory that Bill Gates was plotting to use a COVID-19 vaccine to inject microchips into the population. Months after vaccination began, a Monmouth poll conducted April 8–12, 2021, found that two-thirds of Democratic voters had already been vaccinated but only one-third of Republican voters had done so. A Quinnipiac poll conducted on the same dates found that 45% of Republicans said they did not plan to be vaccinated. The New York Times wrote that the vaccination program was "hitting what appears to be a soft ceiling" as it moved to dealing with the demographic groups where vaccine hesitancy was stronger.

In January 2021, approximately one third of the population was concerned the vaccine might be made mandatory.

A Frank Luntz poll in mid-April 2021 found a rise in vaccine confidence from the previous month, despite the pause of the Johnson and Johnson vaccine.

A later poll by The Washington Post and ABC News found that 86% of self-identified Democrats surveyed had received at least one dose, as opposed to 45% of self-identified Republicans.

In July 2021, The New York Times noted that there were two groups of Americans who remained hesitant to get the vaccine, the first group being "a mix of people but tend to be disproportionately white, rural, evangelical Christian and politically conservative" and the second group being "a broad range of people, but tend to be a more diverse and urban group, including many younger people, Black and Latino Americans, and Democrats."

At the end of November 2022, "only about 13% of those eligible ha[d] received an updated booster dose."

== See also ==
- Deployment of COVID-19 vaccines
- COVID-19 pandemic in the United States
- COVID-19 vaccine
- Ohio Vax-A-Million
