= 1876 in Colorado =

- Decades: 1860s; 1870s; 1880s; 1890s
- See also: History of Colorado; Historical outline of Arizona; List of years in Colorado; 1876 in the United States

The following is a list of events of the year 1876 in Colorado.

== Incumbents ==
- Governor: John Long Routt (R) (starting November 3)

== Events ==
- August 1 — The Territory of Colorado is admitted to the union of the United States as the 38th U.S. state.
- October 3 — 1876 Colorado gubernatorial election: John Long Routt is elected as the first governor of Colorado.
