= 2019 in Colorado =

- Decades: 1990s; 2000s; 2010s; 2020s
- See also: History of Colorado; Historical outline of Arizona; List of years in Colorado; 2019 in the United States

The following is a list of events of the year 2019 in Colorado.

== Incumbents ==
- Governor: Jared Polis (D) (starting January 8)
- Lieutenant Governor: Dianne Primavera (D) (starting January 8)

== Events ==
- February 11 — Denver Public Schools Teachers Strike: Over 2,000 Denver public school teachers walked out on strike for three days following a breakdown in salary structure negotiations, marking the district’s first major teacher strike in 25 years.
- March 13 — The Record-Breaking "Bomb Cyclone": A historic, hurricane-strength winter storm system hit the Front Range. It registered the lowest barometric pressure ever recorded in Colorado, caused massive regional blizzards, grounded all flights at Denver International Airport, and stranded thousands of drivers.
- April — Governor Jared Polis signed House Bill 1177, enacting a highly contested Extreme Risk Firearm Protection Order system. The law authorized state courts to temporarily strip firearms from residents deemed an imminent danger to themselves or others.
- May 7 — A mass shooting occurred at a charter school in Highlands Ranch, resulting in the death of 18-year-old Kendrick Castillo, who lunged at the attacker to protect classmates.
- August — Denver International Airport officials officially fired Great Hall Partners, the primary private contractor on a massive $650 million terminal renovation. The decision came after steep delays, corporate finger-pointing, and severe structural concrete safety concerns.
- August 24 — Killing of Elijah McClain: The 23-year-old massage therapist was stopped by Aurora police, placed in a carotid hold, and injected with ketamine by responding paramedics. He died on August 30, which triggered protests and subsequent statewide policing bans on chokeholds.
