= 2022 in Colorado =

- Decades: 2000s; 2010s; 2020s
- See also: History of Colorado; Historical outline of Arizona; List of years in Colorado; 2022 in the United States

The following is a list of events of the year 2022 in Colorado.

== Incumbents ==
- Governor: Jared Polis (D)

== Events ==
- January 1 — 2021–2022 Boulder County fires: At least three people are confirmed missing, and at least 988 homes are confirmed destroyed, after a wildfire struck Boulder County on December 30, 2021.
- May 29 — One person is killed and eleven others injured after a boat capsizes in Lake Pueblo State Park.
- June 26 — In ice hockey, the Colorado Avalanche defeat the Tampa Bay Lightning in six games to win their first Stanley Cup since the 2001 season, thereby dethroning the Lightning in their quest to three-peat.
- July 29 — Colorado reports a case of West Nile virus in a person from Delta County.
- November 20 — Colorado Springs nightclub shooting:
  - Five people are killed and 25 others injured in a mass shooting at a gay bar in Colorado Springs, during a drag show and a commemoration of the Transgender Day of Remembrance. A suspect is taken into custody shortly afterward.
