= 2020 in Colorado =

- Decades: 2000s; 2010s; 2020s
- See also: History of Colorado; Historical outline of Arizona; List of years in Colorado; 2020 in the United States

The following is a list of events of the year 2020 in Colorado.

== Incumbents ==
=== State government ===
- Governor: Jared Polis (D)
- Lieutenant Governor: Dianne Primavera (D)

== Events ==
- January 22–26 – Winter X Games XXIV
- March 5 – Colorado records its first two confirmed cases of COVID-19 within the state.
- March 14 – The Colorado State Legislature votes to suspend its 2020 legislative session due to pandemic concerns.
- March 25 – Governor Jared Polis issues a statewide "Stay-at-Home" executive order to curb COVID-19 transmission.
- May 28 – Daily George Floyd protests begin in Denver.

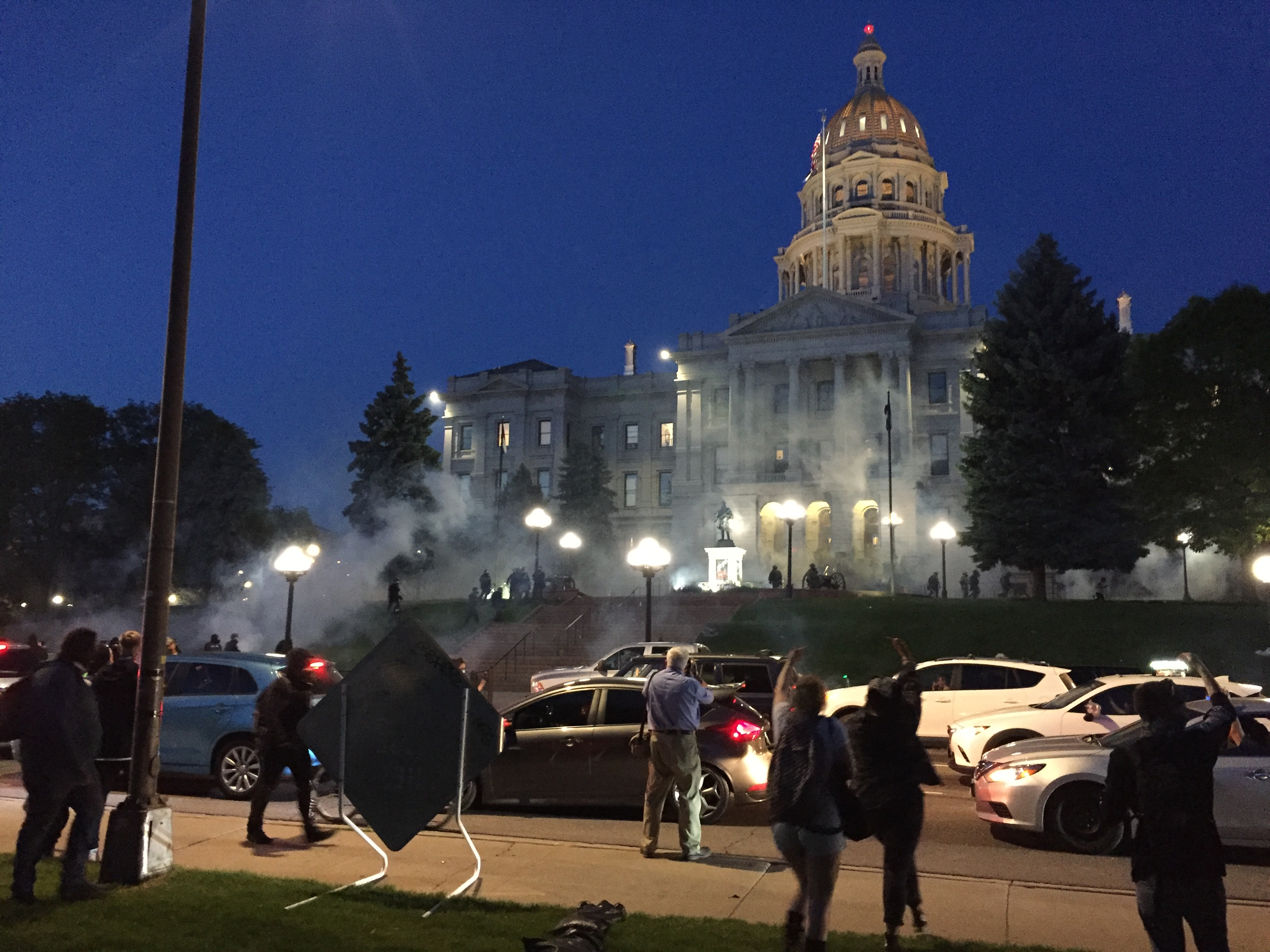
Tear gas deployed at the George Floyd protest at the Colorado State Capitol in Denver on May 29

- July 14 – The 47th Telluride Film Festival is cancelled due to the COVID-19 pandemic.
- July 31 – The Pine Gulch Fire ignites north of Grand Junction, eventually burning 139,007 acres and temporarily becoming the largest wildfire in state history.
- August 13 – The Cameron Peak Fire ignites near Chambers Lake, eventually burning over 208,663 acres to become the largest wildfire in Colorado history.
- October 14 – The East Troublesome Fire ignites in Grand County, burning 193,812 acres and crossing the Continental Divide.
- November 3 – The 2020 United States presidential election in Colorado takes place, with Joe Biden winning the state's electoral votes over Donald Trump. Colorado voters also pass Proposition 114, approving a plan to reintroduce gray wolves, and Proposition 118, establishing a paid family leave program.
