= 2024 in Colorado =

- Decades: 2000s; 2010s; 2020s
- See also: History of Colorado; Historical outline of Arizona; List of years in Colorado; 2024 in the United States

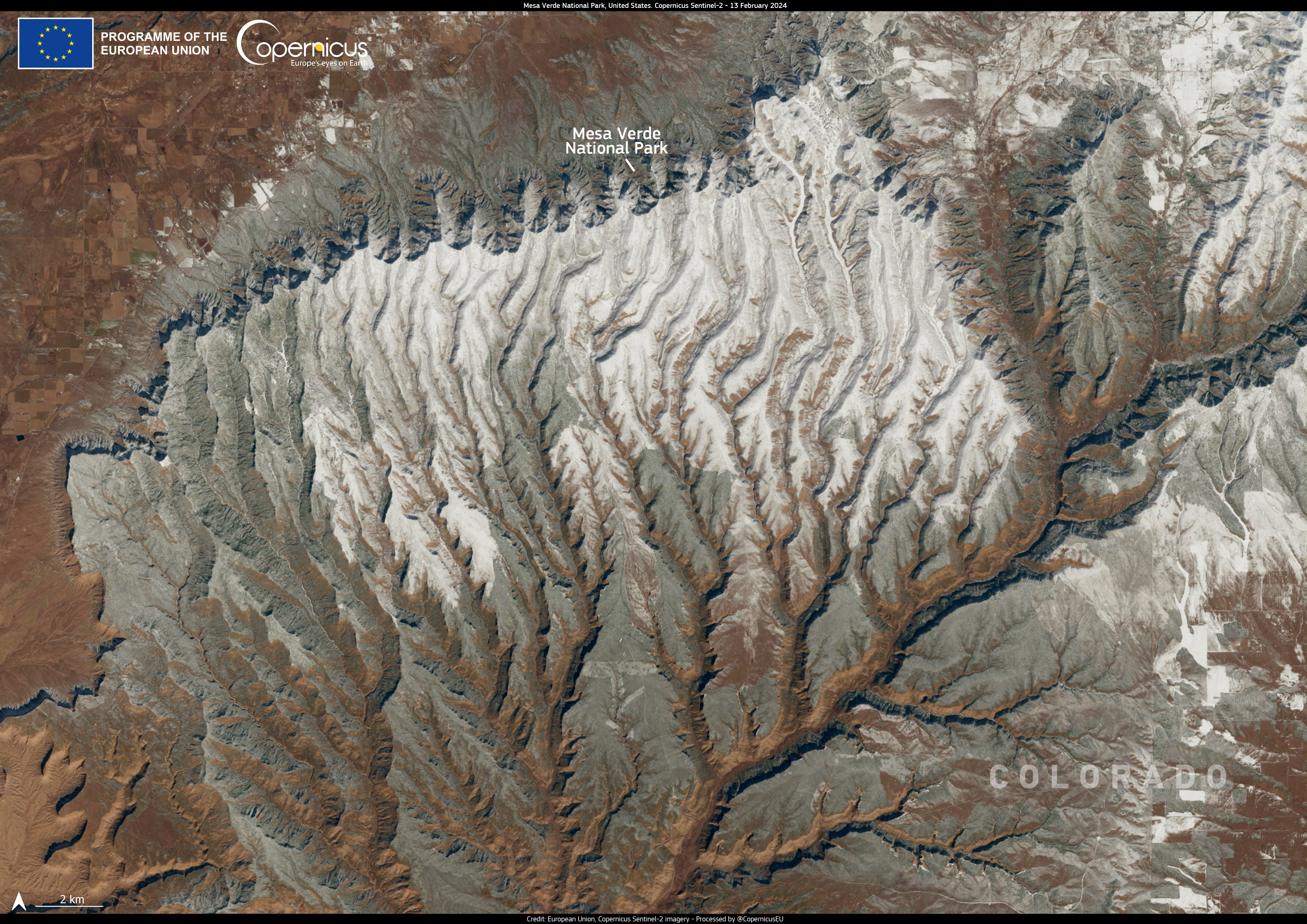
New Wintering Wildlife Conservation Initiative in Colorado, Feb. 2024

The following is a list of events of the year 2024 in Colorado, United States.

== Incumbents ==
=== State government ===
- Governor: Jared Polis (Democrat)

== Events ==
- January 2 – A man breaks into the Colorado Supreme Court building in Denver. He holds a security guard at gunpoint and later voluntarily surrenders to police.
- January 5 – The U.S. Supreme Court grants a writ of certiorari for former president Donald Trump's appeal of the Colorado Supreme Court ruling in Anderson v. Griswold regarding his presidential eligibility, and schedules oral arguments for February 8.
- February 8 – The U.S. Supreme Court hears arguments on whether the Colorado Supreme Court had the authority to exclude former president Donald Trump from the Colorado presidential primary ballot, for allegedly violating Section 3 of the Fourteenth Amendment to the United States Constitution.
- March 4 – Trump v. Anderson: The U.S. Supreme Court unanimously overturns the Colorado Supreme Court ruling removing former president Donald Trump from the Colorado presidential primary ballot, based on the lack of authority of states to enforce Section 3 of the 14th Amendment of the Constitution "against federal officeholders and candidates".
- March 5 – Super Tuesday:
  - The Democratic Party holds presidential nominating contests in Colorado amongst other states.
  - The Republican Party holds presidential nominating contests in Colorado amongst other states.

== See also ==
- 2024 in the United States
