= 2025 in Colorado =

- Decades: 2000s; 2010s; 2020s
- See also: History of Colorado; Historical outline of Arizona; List of years in Colorado; 2025 in the United States

The following is a list of events of the year 2025 in Colorado.

== Incumbents ==
=== State government ===
- Governor: Jared Polis (D)

== Events ==
- March 13 – An American Airlines Boeing 737-800 catches fire on the runway at the Denver International Airport, with passengers evacuated.
- March 24 – The Colorado State Capitol removes a portrait of President Donald Trump after he called it "purposefully distorted" in a Truth Social post the previous day.
- April 1 – 2025 Aurora mayoral election
- April 27 – More than 100 people suspected of entering the United States illegally are detained in a raid by the DEA and ICE at a nightclub in Colorado Springs which had been investigated for drug trafficking and prostitution.
- May 2 – The Trump administration sues the state of Colorado and the city of Denver over alleged sanctuary laws.
- May 12 – Radio transmitters fail at Denver International Airport, making air traffic controllers unable to communicate with pilots for about two minutes.
- June 1 – Multiple people are injured in an incendiary terror attack targeting a demonstration in Boulder that was held in support of Israeli hostages. A man is arrested. One of the victims later dies of her injuries.
- July 16 – The state of Nebraska sues Colorado, claiming they take too much water from the South Platte River.
- August 20 – Six men die in an accident involving gas exposure at a dairy near Keenesburg.
- September 2 – Trump announces the Space Operations Command headquarters will be moved from Colorado Springs to Huntsville, Alabama.
- September 10 – Two Evergreen High School students are shot outside the school in Evergreen. The shooter commits suicide.
- October 28 – During a protest in Durango, an ICE agent grabs a woman and puts her in a chokehold. The protest was organized in response to the detainment of a man the previous day. The agent is later charged with assault.
- November 26 – State Senator Faith Winter (D–Broomfield) is killed in a vehicle crash south of Denver.
- December 11 – President Trump announces that he has pardoned Tina Peters, an election clerk who was convicted of breaching election machines in 2021. However, Peters was convicted only on state charges, so the claimed pardon Trump grants does not apply.

== Sports ==
- 2024–25 Denver Nuggets season

== See also ==
- 2025 in the United States
