= Biden administration COVID-19 action plan =

The Biden administration COVID-19 action plan, also called the Path out of the Pandemic, is a substantial increase in the use of vaccination mandates as part of the U.S. federal government response to the COVID-19 pandemic announced by President Joe Biden on September 9, 2021, to be carried out by officials in the Biden administration. The plan included various announced prospective efforts, as well as the issuance of several executive orders.

The plan had three major components aimed at increasing vaccination levels among American workers, these being a requirement that federal contractors have fully vaccinated personnel, that recipients of Medicare and Medicaid dollars (CMS entities) have fully vaccinated personnel, and a Temporary Emergency Standard by the Occupational Safety and Health Administration (OSHA) requiring that all businesses with more than 100 employees have their employees either vaccinated or tested for COVID-19 on a weekly basis. The rule for federal contractors was issued on September 24, 2021, while the OSHA and CMS rules were issued on November 4, 2021.

The plan also called for measures to increase the availability of booster shots for people previously vaccinated for COVID-19, and to deploy additional resources to provide care for those infected with the disease. On January 19, 2022, the Biden administration is reported to begin freely providing 400 million N95 masks in the United States.

Many aspects of the plan, particularly those relating to vaccination mandates, drew opposition, and in some cases, litigation. Ultimately, the United States Supreme Court issued a pair of rulings, one suspending the OSHA mandate, and the other permitting the CMS mandate to go forward. Other courts stayed the mandates for federal contractors and federal employees, but a substantial majority of persons in those positions were vaccinated while those mandates were in effect.

== History ==
On September 9, 2021, Biden announced a six-point plan of new measures to help control the pandemic, with the points being:

1. Vaccinating the Unvaccinated
2. Further Protecting the Vaccinated
3. Keeping Schools Safely Open
4. Increasing Testing & Requiring Masking
5. Protecting Our Economic Recovery
6. Improving Care for those with COVID-19

The plan included new executive orders and regulatory actions to effectively mandate vaccination for COVID-19 among a large swath of the American workforce. Executive orders were announced directing all federal agencies to mandate the vaccination of their employees (with exceptions as required by law, and no option for regular testing in lieu of vaccination) per guidance to be developed by the Safer Federal Workforce Task Force, and all future government contracts to include a clause requiring compliance with guidance to be developed by the Safer Federal Workforce Task Force (likely to include a similar mandate). The administration later set a November 22, 2021 deadline for most federal employees to be fully vaccinated and a January 4, 2022 deadline for federal contractors to be vaccinated.

The employees of all federally-funded Medicaid and Medicare-certified health care facilities, and Head Start program facilities, must be vaccinated. Companies with more than 100 employees may choose to require vaccination and must give their workers four hours' paid time off for their vaccination appointments; their unvaccinated employees (if any) must wear masks and be tested weekly for COVID-19, according to an Occupational Safety and Health Administration (OSHA) Emergency Temporary Standard. These two policies together—federally-funded healthcare facilities and large companies—will apply to 100 million workers and are scheduled to take effect on January 4, 2022. Biden explained that corporate vaccine mandates had already been implemented by "some of the biggest companies" in the country, including Disney, Fox News, Tyson Foods, and United Airlines, and that "We’ve been patient. But our patience is wearing thin, and your refusal has cost all of us."

=== June 2021 OSHA Healthcare ETS ===
In June 2021, OSHA issued an Emergency Temporary Standard for the healthcare industry, requiring that employers in that industry take various steps to protect employees from the spread of COVID-19. In particular, these included social distancing and hygiene measures, and a requirement that employers ask employees from time to time whether they are experiencing any symptoms of the disease, but they did not include either a vaccination requirement or a testing requirement. ETS is effective until it is replaced by a permanent standard.

== Vaccine mandates ==
=== Executive Order 14042 ===
Titled "Executive Order on Ensuring Adequate COVID Safety Protocols for Federal Contractors", this Executive Order also issued on September 9 instructed government agencies to require employees of federal contractors be vaccinated.

Pursuant to this executive order, the administration released a document titled COVID-19 Workplace Safety: Guidance for Federal Contractors and Subcontractors.

This standard required that all federal contracts issued after November 15, 2021, or renewed or optioned after October 15, 2021, must contain a clause requiring that contracting parties have a vaccination mandate in place covering employees working on the contract, as well as employees who supervise the contract employees, and employees who work in close physical proximity to the contract employees.

On November 30, 2021, the United States District Court for the Eastern District of Kentucky enjoined enforcement of this requirement in the states of Kentucky, Ohio, and Tennessee, finding that it was beyond the power of federal procurement laws. Shortly thereafter, the United States District Court for the Western District of Louisiana extended this injunction to the rest of the United States.

=== Executive Order 14043 ===
Titled "Requiring Coronavirus Disease 2019 Vaccination for Federal Employees", this order required that government agencies "shall implement, to the extent consistent with applicable law, a program to require COVID–19 vaccination for all of its Federal employees, with exceptions only as required by law".

This order was also challenged in various courts. As of August 2022, it remained stayed nationwide by the Fifth Circuit. Nevertheless, a substantial majority of federal employees were vaccinated pursuant to the order without objection and prior to the court action.

=== Head Start vaccination mandate ===
On January 1, 2022, judge Terry A. Doughty of the United States District Court for the Western District of Louisiana blocked that vaccination mandate for Head Start teachers.

=== Medicare and Medicaid Programs; Omnibus COVID-19 Health Care Staff Vaccination ===
The Centers for Medicare & Medicaid Services (CMS) promulgated an interim rule requiring that companies receiving Medicare and Medicaid payments must have employees fully vaccinated by January 4, 2022, with exceptions for employees with medical and religious exemptions. Unlike the simultaneously released OSHA standard, there is no option for employees without an exemption to be tested rather than being vaccinated.

This rule was stayed in ten states by a court order issued on November 29, 2021, and in the rest of the country by a separate court order issued the following day.

In January 2022, the CMS mandate was upheld by a 5–4 decision of the Supreme Court, but CMS later issued guidance indicating that they would give hospitals substantial flexibility in allowing exemptions to the mandate.

=== OSHA COVID-19 Vaccination Emergency Temporary Standard ===
The OSHA standard requires covered companies to either institute a vaccination mandate, or to institute a policy requiring employees to choose between either vaccination or a combination of weekly testing and mask-wearking at the workplace.

The standard applies to all businesses with over 100 employees, including full-time and part-time employees, but excluding contractors. Employees who work entirely remotely or entirely outdoors, or otherwise do not come into contact with other people through the course of their employment, are exempt from the vaccination and/or testing requirement. However, a company with over 100 employees is still generally under the standard even if all or nearly all employees work remotely.

Employers are required to provide up to four hours of paid leave for each vaccination dose received, and sufficient sick leave to allow employees to recover from any effects of vaccination.

Although the ETS initially required employees to be vaccinated by December 6, it does not implement any consequences for nonvaccination (these being testing and mask-wearing requirements) until January 4. Non-vaccinating employees must take a COVID-19 test either monitored by company personnel or through a third-party service, to insure that employees do not misrepresent the results of COVID-19 tests. Employees who choose not to be vaccinated must pay the cost of their own testing. Employers must maintain records of employee vaccination status. Furthermore, employees are required to report work-related COVID-19 fatalities within 8 hours of the employer learning of them, and work-related COVID-19 hospitalizations within 24 hours of the employer learning of them. Penalties for noncompliance can be $13,653 per instance, and up to $136,532 per instance of willful noncompliance.

Individual states may be exempted from the OSHA ETS if they adopt their own health and safety regulations of equal or greater effect.

On November 5, 2021, the OSHA ETS was temporarily stayed by the United States Court of Appeals for the Fifth Circuit, pending arguments by parties opposing the ETS, and by the government in support of the ETS; this stay was then extended on November 12, 2021. OSHA thereafter announced its suspension of enforcement of the ETS during these legal proceedings. The stay was lifted by the United States Court of Appeals for the Sixth Circuit on December 17, 2021.

On January 13, 2022, the Supreme Court of the United States disagreed with Sixth Circuit, ordering that enforcement of the ETS was to be "stayed pending disposition of the applicants' petitions for review in the United States Court of Appeals for the Sixth Circuit". The majority opinion was held by Chief Justice Roberts and Associate Justices Thomas, Alito, Gorsuch, Kavanaugh, and Coney Barrett. A dissenting opinion was issued by Justices Breyer, Sotomayor, and Kagan.

Justices Gorsuch, Thomas, and Alito concluded in their concurring opinion that "under the law as it stands today, that power rests with the States and Congress, not OSHA". However, the controlling per curiam opinion stated:

That is not to say OSHA lacks authority to regulate occupation-specific risks related to COVID–19. Where the virus poses a special danger because of the particular features of an employee's job or workplace, targeted regulations are plainly permissible. We do not doubt, for example, that OSHA could regulate researchers who work with the COVID–19 virus. So too could OSHA regulate risks associated with working in particularly crowded or cramped environments.

A dissenting opinion by Justices Breyer, Kagan, and Sotomayor would have found the OSHA mandate to be within the statutory power afforded to the agency. Following the decision of the court, OSHA withdrew the ETS.

=== Responses ===
Many Republicans asserted Biden's order was an unconstitutional overreach of federal authority, and some Republican governors said they would sue to block it. Despite the network being specifically cited by Biden during his speech as a major employer with vaccine requirements, Fox News pundits criticized the move; Sean Hannity described Biden as having "cancelled all medical freedom". The next day, Biden responded to the accusations, stating "Have at it. Look, I am so disappointed that, particularly some of the Republican governors have been so cavalier with the health of these kids, so cavalier with the health of their communities. We're playing for real here, this isn't a game, and I don't know of any scientist out there in this field that doesn't think it makes considerable sense to do the six things I've suggested."

== COVID-19 boosters ==
In addition to mandates, the plan promised steps to quickly role out the availability of booster shots to those eligible to receive them, with boosters to be available for free as early as the week of September 20, subject to FDA approval and review by the Advisory Committee on Immunization Practices. This aspect of the plan raised concerns with some federal officials, who argued that more time was needed to study the efficacy of boosters before widely recommending them.

== Government assistance ==
=== Economic measures ===
The plan provided for an increase in funds available from the COVID Economic Injury Disaster Loan program, with the Small Business Administration (SBA) raising the limit for small businesses borrowing from this program from $500,000 to $2 million, easing access to loans for small businesses with multiple locations, and implementing "a 30-day exclusive window of access where only small businesses seeking loans of $500,000 or less will receive awards after the new improved loan product launches".

The plan also extolled a measure enacted the month before under which the SBA would send pre-completed applications for forgiveness of SBA loans of up to $150,000 to borrowers. The borrowers could then review, sign, and return the form to SBA, to speed up the forgiveness loan forgiveness process.

=== COVIDtests.gov ===
In January 2022, the government launched COVIDtests.gov, a website for American residents to request free rapid tests from the government through the mail.

== Care for the infected ==
The plan promised to double the number of United States Department of Defense teams of clinicians "deployed to support hospitals battling a surge in COVID-19 cases", with deployment to be coordinated through the Federal Emergency Management Agency.

== See also ==
- List of executive actions by Joe Biden
