= 2026 in Colorado =

- Decades: 2000s; 2010s; 2020s
- See also: History of Colorado; Historical outline of Arizona; List of years in Colorado; 2026 in the United States

The following is a list of events of the year 2026 in Colorado.

== Incumbents ==
=== State Government ===
- Governor: Jared Polis (D)

== Events ==
=== January ===
- January 6 – The Department of Health and Human Services announces it is halting $10 billion in social service programs to Colorado and four other Democratic states.

=== February ===
- February 13 – Four people are killed in a small plane crash near Steamboat Springs.
- February 17 – Five people are killed in a crash involving over 30 vehicles on Interstate 25 south of Pueblo.

=== March ===
- March 16 – About 3,800 workers begin a strike at a Swift Beef Co. plant in Greeley.
- March 27 – Four of the seven law enforcement officers in Costilla County, as well as a former deputy, are indicted by a grand jury in two unrelated cases. The sheriff and a former deputy are charged with mishandling human remains, allegedly taking only some of the remains reported by a citizen and leaving the others behind in October 2024. In a separate case, the undersheriff, a deputy, and a sergeant, who is also the sheriff's son, are charged with assault for allegedly tasing a man who was undergoing a mental health crisis in February 2026.
- March 31 – In Chiles v. Salazar, the Supreme Court rules that a Colorado ban on conversion therapy should be sent back to the lower courts to determine if the ban violates the First Amendment.

=== April ===
- April 2 – An appeals court orders a resentencing for election denier and former county clerk Tina Peters, who in 2024 was sentenced to nine years in prison for seven charges related to election interference in the 2020 presidential election.
- April 11 – The Denver Pioneers beat the Wisconsin Badgers 2–1 to win the 2026 NCAA Division I men's ice hockey tournament. It is their third title in five years.
- April 21 – The La Plata County District Attorney's office charges an ICE officer with assault over a 2025 incident in which he was filmed putting a protester in a chokehold.

=== May ===
- May 5 – The Trump administration sues the city of Denver over its assault weapons ban, which was put in place in 1989.
- May 8 – A Frontier Airlines flight strikes a pedestrian at Denver International Airport during takeoff, causing an engine fire and forcing the plane to evacuate. The pedestrian reportedly hopped a fence two minutes prior to their death.
- May 15 – Governor Polis commutes the sentence of Tina Peters.
- May 20
  - The Colorado Supreme Court rules 5–3 that Children's Hospital Colorado (CHC) in Aurora must resume providing gender-affirming care such as puberty blockers and hormone therapy for minor patients after CHC halted such care in December.
  - The Colorado Democratic Party censures Jared Polis over his commutation of Tina Peters.

=== June ===
- June 4
  - Governor Polis declares a statewide drought emergency.
  - An appeals court orders new trials for two paramedics who had been convicted of negligent homicide over the 2020 killing of Elijah McClain in Aurora.
- June 27 – Three firefighters are killed fighting the Snyder Fire in Mesa County.
- June 30 – Melat Kiros, a member of the Democratic Socialists of America, defeats U.S. Representative Diana DeGette in the Democratic primary for Colorado’s 1st Congressional District, which encompasses most of Denver.

=== July ===
- July 16 – An employee of an ICE processing center in Aurora is arrested and charged with shooting a protester outside the facility.

=== November ===
- November 3 – 2026 Colorado gubernatorial election: Colorado Attorney General Phil Weiser wins election, beating Republican nominee Victor Marx.

== See also ==
- 2026 in the United States
