= Klaassen v. Indiana University =

2021 United States federal court case

Klaassen v. Indiana University (No. 1:21-CV-238 DRL, N.D. Ind.), was a 2021 United States federal court case in which students attending Indiana University challenged the institution's COVID-19 vaccine mandate set to go into effect in September 2021. A motion for preliminary injunction was denied by Judge Damon R. Leichty on July 18, 2021. On August 2, 2021, the United States Court of Appeals for the Seventh Circuit also denied a motion to enjoin the mandate while Leichty's ruling was appealed. On August 12, 2021, Justice Amy Coney Barrett denied relief to the petitioners, allowing the vaccination mandate to go into effect. The case is named for lead plaintiff Ryan Klassen of Noble County, Indiana.

In May 2021, Indiana University announced that COVID-19 vaccination would be mandatory for the fall 2021 semester, except for students who received a medical or religious exemption from vaccination. Students ineligible for an exemption would either need to be vaccinated, or would be excluded from the university, while students who received exemptions would need to wear masks, undergo periodic testing for COVID-19, and engage in certain social distancing activities. Eight students filed a lawsuit objecting to this requirement. Most of these students had either already received religious exemptions from vaccination, or were eligible for such exemptions, but objected to the requirement that they be singled out for mask-wearing and COVID-19 testing if they continued to be unvaccinated.

The opinion of the district court judge denying preliminary injunction was 101 pages, unusually lengthy for that stage of the case. Judge Leichty addressed at length the question of whether the 1905 United States Supreme Court case of Jacobson v. Massachusetts was still the appropriate legal precedent to follow, concluding that it was. Judge Leichty further examined the objection that the vaccines being mandated were only available under Emergency Use Authorization, and found this to be no impediment to the mandates on the basis that the Food and Drug Administration had employed an "EUA-plus" degree of examination, providing far more stringent requirements for issuance of the EUA than were required by law. The Seventh Circuit decision did not discuss the EUA status of the vaccines, but noted that the case was "easier than Jacobson for the University" because of the broader exemptions provided by the university, and because the mandate was directed not to the general public, but only to university students and staff.

The case was finally dismissed on February 22, 2022. Notably, all of the judges who considered the case were Republican appointees, including Judge Leichty on the district court, Judges Easterbrook, Scudder, and Kirsch on the Seventh Circuit panel, and Justice Barrett on the Supreme Court.
