= List of power stations in Arizona =

Sources of Arizona utility-scale electricity generation in gigawatt-hours, full-year 2025:
1. Natural gas: 52,728 (45.0%)
2. Nuclear: 31,322 (26.7%)
3. Solar: 15,614 (13.3%)
4. Coal: 9,219 (7.87%)
5. Hydroelectric: 4,939 (4.21%)
6. Wind: 3,150 (2.69%)
7. Biomass: 213 (0.18%)

This is a list of electricity-generating power stations in the U.S. state of Arizona, sorted by type and name. In 2024, Arizona had a net summer capacity of 32.9 GW through all of its power plants, and a net generation of 116,027 GWh. The electrical energy generation mix in 2025 was 45% natural gas, 26.7% nuclear, 13.3% solar, 7.9% coal, 4.2% hydroelectric, 2.7% wind, and 0.2% biomass. Small-scale solar, including customer-owned photovoltaic panels, delivered an additional net 5,785 GWh to the state's electrical grid. This compares as about one-third the amount generated by Arizona's utility-scale solar plants.

Arizona's Palo Verde Nuclear Generating Station located to the west of Phoenix is the nation's largest facility by annual energy production, and is the second largest facility by power capacity after Washington state's Grand Coulee Dam hydroelectric station. The electricity generated by utility- and small-scale solar together surpassed the amount from all of Arizona's hydroelectric facilities for the first time in 2017.

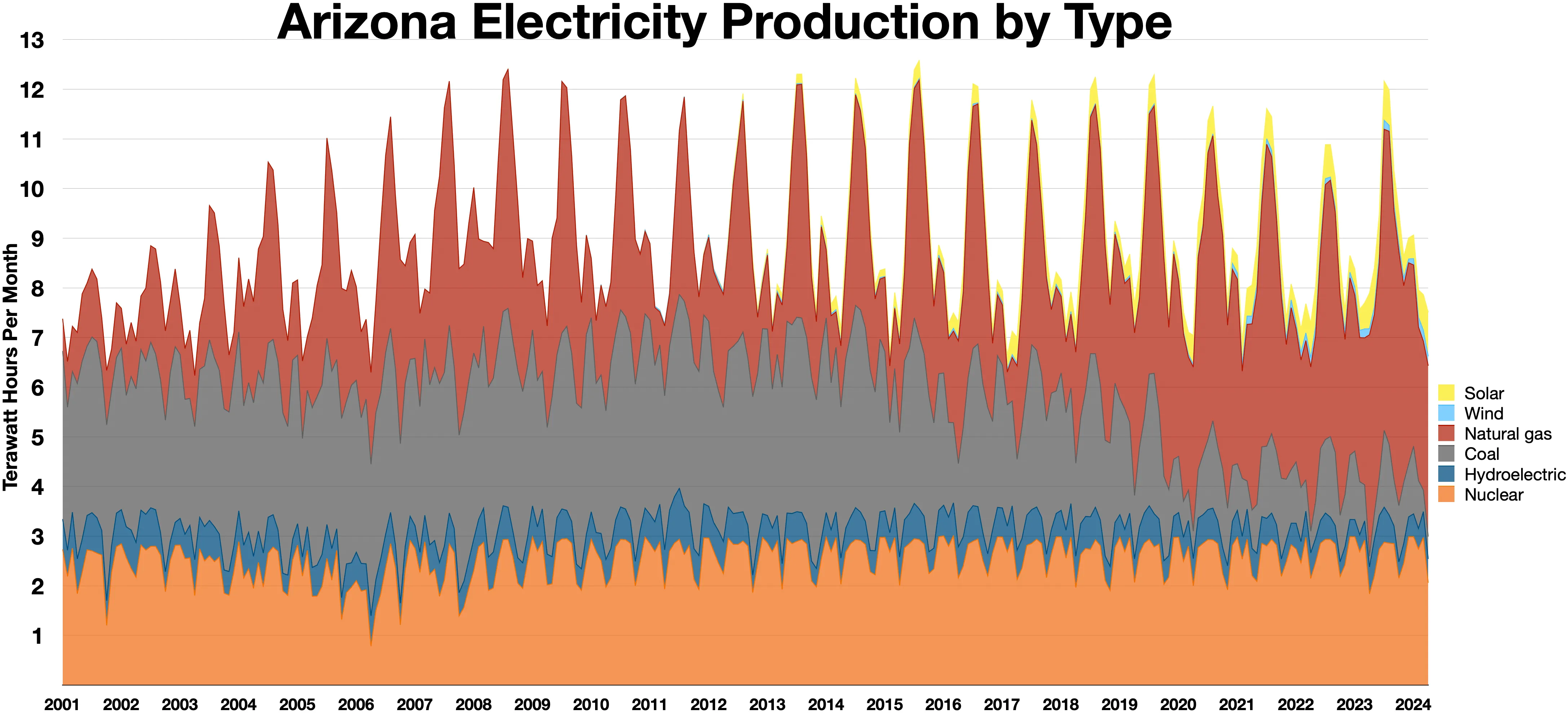
Arizona electricity production by type

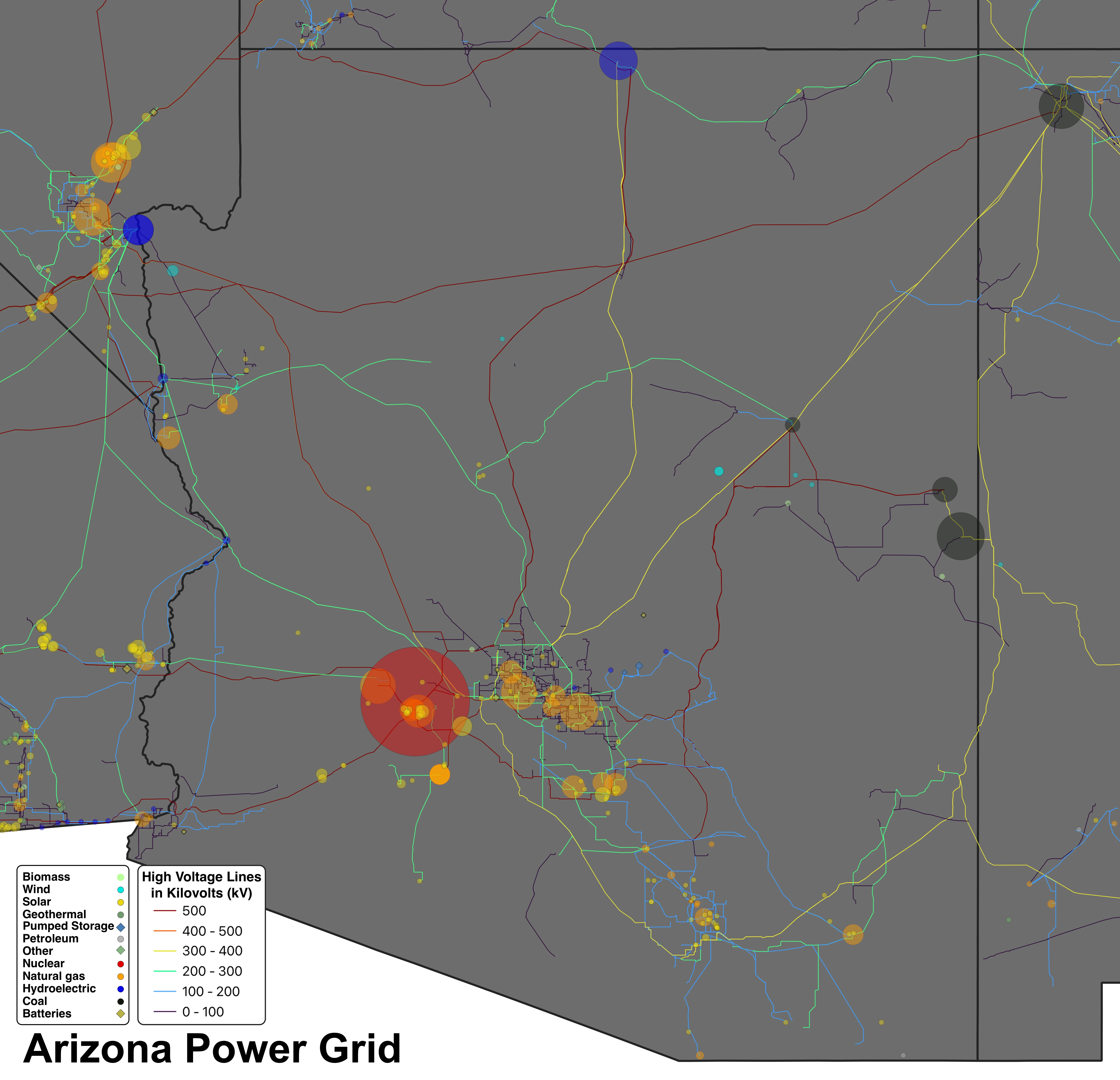
Arizona power grid

== Nuclear power stations ==
Name	County	Coordinates	Capacity (MW)	Year opened	Ref
Palo Verde Nuclear Generating Station	Maricopa County	33°23′17″N 112°51′42″W	3,937	1986 (Unit 1- 1,311 MW); 1986 (Unit 2- 1,314 MW); 1988 (Unit 3- 1,312 MW)	

== Fossil-fuel power stations ==
Data from the U.S. Energy Information Administration serves as a general reference.

=== Coal ===
Operating power plants
Name	County	Coordinates	Capacity (MW)	Year opened	Scheduled retirement	Refs
Apache Generating Station	Cochise County	32°03′37″N 109°53′35″W	204 (coal only)	1964 (Unit 1- 82MW); 1979 (Unit 2- 204MW); 1979 (Unit 3- 204MW)	2018 (Unit 1- ng convert); 2018 (Unit 2- ng convert); 2027 (Unit 3- ng convert)	
Coronado Generating Station	Apache County	34°34′44″N 109°16′15″W	822	1979 (Unit 1- 411MW); 1980 (Unit 2- 411MW)	2029 (ng convert)	
Springerville Generating Station	Apache County	34°19′07″N 109°09′50″W	1,766	1985 (Unit 1- 425MW); 1990 (Unit 2- 425MW); 2006 (Unit 3- 458MW); 2009 (Unit 4- 458MW)	2027 (Unit 1); 2030 (Unit 2 - ng convert); 2031 (Unit 3); 2029 (Unit 4)	

Retired power plants
Name	County	Coordinates	Capacity (MW)	Year opened	Year closed	Refs
Navajo Generating Station	Coconino County	36°54′17″N 111°23′19″W	2,409	1974 (Unit 1- 803MW); 1975 (Unit 2- 803MW); 1976 (Unit 3- 803MW)	2019	
Cholla Power Plant	Navajo County	34°56′22″N 110°18′12″W	426	1962 (Unit 1- 114MW); 1978 (Unit 2- 289MW); 1980 (Unit 3- 312MW); 1981 (Unit 4- 414MW)	2025 (Unit 1); 2015 (Unit 2 closed); 2025 (Unit 3); 2020 (Unit 4 closed)	

=== Natural gas ===
Name	County	Coordinates	Capacity (MW)	Generation type	Year opened	Refs
Agua Fria Generating Station	Maricopa County	33°33′22″N 112°12′55″W	626	Steam turbine (x3); Simple cycle (x3)	1957/1958/1961 (407MW); 1974/1975 (219MW)	
Apache Generating Station	Cochise County	32°03′37″N 109°53′35″W	285 (gas only)	Steam turbine (x2)	2018 (convert from coal)	
Arlington Valley Plant	Maricopa County	33°20′30″N 112°53′23″W	69	2x1 combined cycle	2002	
Coolidge Generating Station	Pinal County	32°55′03″N 111°30′12″W	575	Simple cycle (x12)	2011	
Desert Basin Power Plant	Pinal County	32°54′15″N 111°47′20″W	577	2x1 combined cycle	2001	
Demoss Petrie Power Plant	Pinal County	32°15′08″N 110°59′32″W	85	Simple cycle	2001	
Gila River Generating Station	Maricopa County	32°58′30″N 112°41′40″W	2,200	2x1 combined cycle (x4)	2003	
Griffith Energy	Mohave County	35°03′14″N 114°08′00″W	654	2x1 combined cycle	2002	
Harquahala Generating Station	Maricopa County	33°28′34″N 113°06′48″W	1092	1x1 combined cycle (x3)	2004	
H. Wilson Sundt Generating Station	Pima County	32°09′36″N 110°54′17″W	502	Steam turbine (x2); Simple cycle (x2); Reciprocating engine (x5)	1962/1967 (360MW); 1972 (48MW); 2019 (94MW)	
Kyrene Power Plant	Maricopa County	33°21′20″N 111°56′07″W	525	Steam turbine (x2); Simple cycle (x3); 1x1 combined cycle	1952/1954 (106MW); 1971/1973 (165MW); 2002 (254MW)	
Mesquite Power Plant	Maricopa County	33°20′42″N 112°51′51″W	1,250	2x1 combined cycle (x2)	2003	
North Loop Power Plant	Pima County	32°24′04″N 111°07′34″W	108	Simple cycle (x4)	1972/2001	
Ocotillo Power Plant	Maricopa County	33°25′21″N 111°54′44″W	916	Simple cycle (x7)	1972/1973/2019	
Red Hawk Power Station	Maricopa County	33°20′05″N 112°50′26″W	1,060	2x1 combined cycle (x2)	2002	
Saguaro Power Plant	Pinal County	32°33′06″N 111°18′00″W	184	Simple cycle (x3)	1972/1973/2002	
Santan Power Plant	Maricopa County	33°19′57″N 111°45′01″W	1,235	Combined cycle (x4); 2x1 combined cycle 1x1 combined cycle	1974/1975 (376MW); 2005 (582MW); 2006 (277MW)	
Sundance Generating Station	Pinal County	32°55′43″N 111°35′24″W	450	Simple cycle (x10)	2002	
Valencia Power Plant	Santa Cruz County	31°21′49″N 110°55′53″W	108	Simple cycle (x4)	1989/2006	
West Phoenix Power Plant	Maricopa County	33°26′30″N 112°09′30″W	920	Simple cycle (x2); Combined cycle (x3); 2x1 combined cycle 1x1 combined cycle	1972/1973 (100MW); 1976 (255MW); 2001 (107MW); 2003 (458MW)	
Yucca Power Plant	Yuma County	32°43′17″N 114°42′38″W	250	Steam turbine Simple cycle (x5)	1959 (75MW); 1971/1973/2008 (176MW)	
Yuma Power Plant	Yuma County	32°43′44″N 114°39′15″W	50	1x1 combined cycle	1994	

=== Petroleum ===
Name	County	Coordinates	Capacity (MW)	Generation type	Year opened	Refs
Douglas Power Plant	Cochise County	31°21′51″N 109°33′14″W	25	Simple cycle	1972	
Yucca Power Plant	Yuma County	32°43′17″N 114°42′38″W	71	Simple cycle (x2)	1971/1978	

== Renewable power stations ==
Data from the U.S. Energy Information Administration serves as a general reference.

=== Biomass & refuse ===
Name	County	Coordinates	Capacity (MW)	Fuel type	Generation type	Year opened	Refs
Glendale Energy Plant	Maricopa County	33°32′25″N 112°18′23″W	2.8	Landfill gas	Reciprocating engine (x2)	2010	
Northwest Regional Landfill	Maricopa County	33°40′55″N 112°28′36″W	3.2	Landfill gas	Reciprocating engine (x2)	2012	
Novo BioPower Plant	Navajo County	34°30′12″N 110°20′06″W	22	Wood/ wood waste	Steam turbine	2008	
Western Renewable Energy	Apache County	34°05′35″N 109°17′24″W	2.5	Wood/ wood waste	Steam turbine	2004	

=== Hydroelectric dams ===
Name	County	Coordinates	Capacity (MW)	Year opened	Refs
Arizona Falls	Maricopa County	33°29′24″N 111°57′32″W	0.75	2003	
C.C. Cragin Dam (Blue Ridge)	Coconino County	34°33′16″N 111°11′50″W		1965	
Childs-Irving Hydro	Yavapai County	34°21′04″N 111°42′02″W	4.2	1916	closed
Coolidge Dam	Gila County	33°10′29″N 110°31′40″W	10	1935	closed
Crosscut Hydro	Maricopa County	33°26′22″N 111°56′46″W	3.0	1939	
Davis Dam	Mohave County	35°11′49″N 114°34′15″W	251	1951	
Glen Canyon Dam	Coconino County	36°56′12″N 111°29′02″W	1,320	1964-1966	
Headgate Rock	La Paz County	34°10′06″N 114°16′39″W	19.5	1993	
Hoover Dam	Mohave County	36°00′56″N 114°44′17″W	2,080^{[A]}	1936-1943/ 1952	
Horse Mesa Dam	Maricopa County	33°35′27″N 111°20′38″W	129	1927	
Mormon Flat Dam	Maricopa County	33°33′13″N 111°26′35″W	60	1926	
Parker Dam	La Paz County	34°17′43″N 114°08′25″W	120	1938	
South Consolidated Hydro	Maricopa County	33°27′59″N 111°46′52″W	1.4	1981	
Stewart Mountain Dam	Maricopa County	33°33′58″N 111°32′10″W	13	1930	
Theodore Roosevelt Dam	Gila/Maricopa	33°40′16″N 111°09′42″W	36	1973	

^{A} Generating capacity at Hoover Dam is equally split between Arizona and Nevada. Its total capacity was derated to 1,596 MW in June 2014 due to persistently low water storage levels and projected further declines.

=== Solar thermal plants ===
Name	County	Coordinates	Capacity (MW)	Year opened	Ref
Solana Generating Station	Maricopa County	32°55′20″N 112°57′21″W	280	2013	

=== Solar photovoltaic plants ===
Name	County	Coordinates	Capacity (MW_{AC})	Year opened	Refs
Wilmot Energy Center II	Pima County		100	2026	
Wilmot Energy Center	Pima County	32°02'29.6"N 110°53'36.1"W	100	2021	
Babocomari Solar	Cochise County	31°39'28.4"N 110°24'34.2"W	160	February 2026	
McFarland Solar	Yuma County	32.9376°N 113.4708°W	500	2023/2025	
Saint Solar Energy Center	Pinal County	32.88297°N 111.50855°W	88	2023	
Mesquite Solar project	Maricopa County	33°20′24″N 112°56′02″W	400	2012/2016	
Agua Caliente Solar Project	Yuma County	32°58′39″N 113°29′40″W	290	May 2012/2014	
Sonoran Solar Energy	Maricopa County	33.2425°N 112.5418°W	260	2012	
Agave Solar	Maricopa County	33°19′33″N 112°50′32″W	150	September 25, 2023	
Arlington Valley Solar Energy II	Maricopa County	33°18′18″N 112°50′02″W	125	April 2013	
Saint Solar	Pinal County	32.8643°N 111.5007°W	100	June 2023	
Red Horse III	Cochise County	32°15′40″N 110°09′15″W	81	July 2016	
Kayenta Solar Project	Navajo County	36°47′21″N 110°14′18″W	55	2017/2019	
Gray Hawk Solar	Mohave County	35°20′46″N 113°54′53″W	55	June 2018	
Bonnybrooke Solar	Mohave County	33°03′11″N 111°20′24″W	50	November 2016	
Avalon	Pima County	32°02′19″N 110°57′30″W	45	December 2014/2016	
Sandstone Solar	Pinal County	33°02′08″N 111°27′01″W	45	December 2015	
Red Rock	Maricopa County	32°33′04″N 111°17′21″W	40	February 2017	
Foothills Solar Plant Hybrid	Yuma County	32°38′20″N 114°25′52″W	35	March 2013	
Gila Bend Hybrid	Maricopa County	32°56′56″N 112°46′12″W	32	October 2014	
OE_AZ1	La Paz County	33°46′15″N 113°39′17″W	32	December 2019	
Avra Valley Solar	Pima County	32°22′18″N 111°16′58″W	26	January 2013	
Apache Solar 1	Cochise County	32°04′05″N 109°53′25″W	20	October 2017	
Copper Crossing Solar Ranch	Pinal County	33°09′33″N 111°28′53″W	20	2011	
Pinal Central Energy Center Hybrid	Pinal County	32°52′33″N 111°33′04″W	20	April 2018	
Sulphur Springs	Cochise County	32°03′46″N 109°55′09″W	20	December 2016	
Chino Solar Valley	Yavapai County	34°43′27″N 112°25′54″W	19	December 2012	
Paloma Solar Hybrid	Maricopa County	33.0209°N 112.6616°W	18	September 2011	
Cotton Center Solar Hybrid	Maricopa County	33.0351°N 112.6607°W	17	November 2011	
Saddle Mountain Solar I	Maricopa County	33.38107°N 113.18471°W	15	December 2012	
Desert Star Hybrid	Maricopa County	33.14397°N 112.66304°W	10	September 2015	
Box Canyon Solar Project	Pinal County	33.0972°N 111.2783°W	300	2025	
Eleven Mile Solar Center	Pinal County	32.86115°N 111.58893°W	300	2024	
Storey Solar Energy Center	Pinal County	32.88321°N 111.50827°W	122	December 2023	
Luke Solar	Maricopa County	33.5268°N 112.3807°W	15	June 2015	
Queen Creek Solar Farm	Maricopa County	33.26678°N 111.61353°W	19	October 2012	
Badger 1 Solar	Maricopa County	33.4981°N 112.8131°W	15	November 2013	
Hyder II Hybrid	Yuma County	33.0256°N 113.3535°W	32	December 2013	
Picture Rocks Solar	Pima County	32.37066°N 111.24242°W	20	December 2012	
Brittlebush Solar Park	Pinal County	32.965°N 111.5331°W	200	July 2024	

=== Wind farms ===
Name	County	Coordinates	Capacity (MW)	Year opened	Refs
Dry Lake Wind Power Project	Navajo County	34°39′35″N 110°17′03″W	127	August 2009	
Kingman 1	Mohave County	35°08′45″N 114°04′03″W	10	September 2011	
Perrin Ranch Wind	Coconino County	35°24′56″N 112°16′16″W	99	January 2012	
Red Horse 2	Cochise County	32°17′10″N 110°05′17″W	30	August 2015	
White Hills Wind	Mohave County	35°28′24″N 114°17′21″W	350	2021	
Babbitt Ranch Energy Center	Coconino County	35.6425°N 112.0932°W	161	June 2024	

== Storage power stations ==
Data from the U.S. Energy Information Administration serves as a general reference.

=== Battery storage ===
Name	County	Coordinates	Capacity (MWh / MW)	Year opened	Refs
McFarland Storage	Yuma County	32.9376°N 113.4708°W	1140 / 435	2025	
Storey Solar / BESS	Pinal County	32.88297°N 111.50855°W	88	2023	
Eleven Mile Solar Center BESS	Pinal County	32.86115°N 111.58893°W	1200 / 300	2024	
Agua Fria Generating Station	Maricopa County	33.55340°N 112.21263°W	25	2021	
Paloma Solar Hybrid	Maricopa County	33.02481°N 112.65867°W	17	April 2023	
AES Gilbert ES	Maricopa County	33°26′48″N 111°57′23″W	10	2019	
Iron Horse BESS Hybrid	Pima County	32°05′55″N 110°49′09″W	10	2017	
Pima BESS	Pima County	32°15′06″N 110°59′29″W	10	2017	
Pinal Central Hybrid ES	Pima County	32°52′33″N 111°33′04″W	10	2018	
Desert Star Hybrid	Maricopa County	33.14512°N 112.65962°W	10	February 2023	
Punkin Center BS	Gila County	33°52′33″N 111°18′49″W	2	2018	
Sonoran Solar Energy	Maricopa County	33.23900°N 112.57154°W	1000 / 260	2012 / 2024	
Sierra Estrella Energy Storage Facility	Maricopa County	33.41056°N 112.31426°W	1000 / 250	June 2024	
Superstition Energy Storage facility	Maricopa County	33.35891°N 111.83095°W	90	June 24, 2024	
Storey Solar Energy Center	Pinal County	32.8832°N 111.5087°W	88	December 2023	
Papago Storage	Maricopa County	33.483062°N 113.038630°W	1200 / 300	2025	
Scatter Wash Battery Storage Comple	Maricopa County	33.711025°N 112.081559°W	1020 / 255	April 2025	
Hyder II Hybrid	Yuma County	33.0259°N 113.3521°W	14	2013	
Foothills Solar Plant Hybrid	Yuma County	32.6389°N 114.4313°W	35	April 2023	
Saint Solar Energy Center	Pinal County	32.869459°N 111.512148°W	100		
Signal Butte / Pediment			1000 / 250	Mid 2026	
Flatland Energy Storage Project	Pinal County	32.919705°N 111.503833°W	800 / 200	2026	

=== Pumped storage ===
Name	Location	Coordinates	Capacity (MW)	Year opened	Refs
Horse Mesa	Maricopa County	33°35′27″N 111°20′38″W	119	1972	
Mormon Flat	Maricopa County	33°33′13″N 111°26′35″W	57	1971	
Waddell	Maricopa County	33°50′41″N 112°16′17″W	40	1993	

== Utility companies ==
- Arizona Electric Power Cooperative
- Arizona Public Service
- Salt River Project
- Tucson Electric Power
- UniSource Energy Services

== See also ==
- List of power stations in the United States
