= Avra Valley Solar Generating Station =

Photovoltaic power plant in Pima County, Arizona

Avra Valley Solar
- Country: United States
- Location: Avra Valley
- Coordinates: 32°22′N 111°17′W
- Status: Operational
- Commission date: December 13, 2012
- Owner: NRG Solar
- Operator: Avra Valley Sola

Solar farm
- Type: Flat-panel PV
- Site area: 320 acres

Power generation
- Units operational: 400,000
- Nameplate capacity: 34 MW

Avra Valley Solar is a 34 MW (DC, 25 MW AC) photovoltaic power plant in Avra Valley, Pima County, Arizona, owned by NRG. It uses single axis tracking that is designed to be maintenance free over the twenty year design life of the system. The panels are mounted on a north-south axis and rotate each day to follow the sun from sunrise to sunset, increasing the output by about 20%. Power is being sold to Tucson Electric Power in a 20-year power purchase agreement.

== Production ==
Generation (MW·h) of Avra Valley Solar
Year	Jan	Feb	Mar	Apr	May	Jun	Jul	Aug	Sep	Oct	Nov	Dec	Total
2012												2,125	2,125
2013	4,208	5,074	6,694	7,948	8,475	8,847	6,820	6,126	6,571	6,475	4,381	4,193	75,812
2014	4,539	4,602	6,868	7,377	8,323	8,680	6,812	7,042	5,935	5,815	4,698	3,463	74,154
2015	3,721	4,929	6,561	7,644		7,602	6,703	6,837	5,591	5,214		3,575	58,377
2016	4,118	5,492	6,886	7,349	8,663	7,599	7,953	7,104	5,856	5,798	4,480	3,548	74,846
Total													285,314

== See also ==
- Solar power in Arizona
