= NCSC =

NCSC may refer to:

== Organizations ==
- National Commission for Scheduled Castes, India
- National Cyber Security Centre (Ireland)
- National Cyber Security Centre (Netherlands)
- National Cyber Security Centre (United Kingdom)

=== United States ===
- National Catholic Student Coalition
- National Center for State Courts
- National Computer Security Center, part of the National Security Agency
- National Council for Senior Citizens
- National Counterintelligence and Security Center
- National Cybersecurity Center
- North Carolina Solar Center
- North Carolina Supreme Court
