= Wind power in Arizona =

Electricity from wind in one U.S. state

Wind power projects in Arizona
Operating
Under construction

In 2016, Arizona had 268 megawatts (MW) of wind powered electricity generating capacity, producing 0.5% of in-state generated electricity.

== History ==
Utility-scale wind power in Arizona began in 2009 with the commissioning of the first phase of the Dry Lake Wind Power Project in Navajo County.

== Installed capacity and wind resources ==
The following table compares the growth in wind power installed nameplate capacity in megawatts (MW) for Arizona and the entire United States since 2008.

Year	Arizona	US
2008	0	25,410
2009	63	34,863
2010	128	40,267
2011	139	46,916
2012	238	60,005
2013	238	61,107
2014	238	65,880
2015	268	74,471
2016	268	82,171
2017	268	89,078
2018	268	96,487
2019	268	105,583
2020	618	122,478
2021	618	132,753
2022	618	141,402
2023	855	147,640

Installed capacity by state as of 2018 (animated map of installed capacity growth)

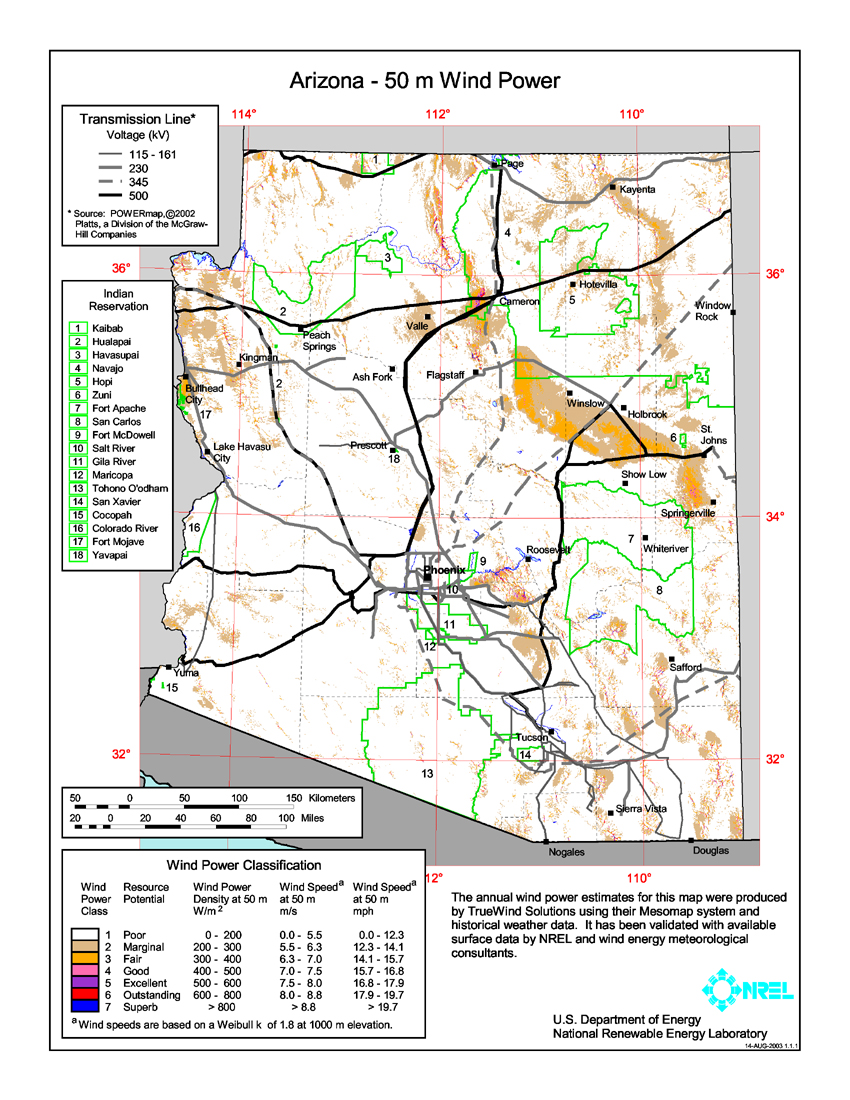
Average annual wind power density map for Arizona at 50m above ground

Arizona has the potential to install up to 10.9 GW of onshore wind power nameplate capacity at 80 meter, 74.4 GW at 110 meter, or 191.0 GW at 140 meter hub height, generating 585 TWh annually. For comparison, Arizona consumed 69.391 TWh of electricity in 2005; the entire U.S. wind power industry was producing at an annual rate of approximately 50 TWh at the end of 2008; Arizona's Palo Verde Nuclear Generating Station produced 26.782 TWh in 2007; and Three Gorges Dam (the world's largest electricity-generating station) produced an average of 80 TWh/yr in 2008 and 2009.

== Wind farms ==
=== Operating ===
- Dry Lake Wind Power Project in Navajo County is Arizona's first utility-scale wind farm. Phase 1 consists of 30 Suzlon 2.1 MW wind turbines, for a total nameplate capacity of 63 MW. Iberdrola Renewables built the wind farm in 2009 for $100 million, and sells the output to Salt River Project.
- Chevelon Butte phase 1. On June 1, 2023 AES announced that phase one of the Chevelon Butte project had begun operations. This portion brings 238 megawatts to the Arizona power grid. The second phase, which is 216 megawatts, was expected to begin construction soon, with plans to be operational in 2024,
- Kingman Wind Farm, built in 2011, has 10 MW of wind turbines.
- Perrin Ranch Wind Farm in Coconino County began operation in 2012 with 62 wind turbines, generating 99.2 MW of electricity.
- Fort Huachuca has an 850 KW two-blade wind turbine installed in 2011.
- Red Horse 2 Wind and Solar Project had 30 MW of wind turbines installed in 2015.

=== Planned ===
- As of 2012, BP Wind Energy of North America proposed building the Mohave County Wind Farm project comprising up to 258 wind turbines on federally managed lands in Mohave County. The site – about 49,000 acres of public land – is in the White Hills area about 40 miles northwest of Kingman and 20 miles southeast of Hoover Dam. The project should have up to 500 MW of capacity and construction may be in phases. Transmission lines are planned to connect to existing Western Area Power Administration lines. The project was sold to NextEra Energy and renamed the White Hills Wind Project. Larger turbines will be used, reducing the number needed. An interconnection to WAPA's Mead-Peacock 345-kV transmission line was approved by WAPA in May 2019. Construction of the 127 turbine farm began in 2020, with initial power output expected by the end of the year. Southern California Clean Power Alliance has signed a 20-year power purchase agreement for 300 MW from the wind farm.
- Utility-scale wind power at Babbitt Ranch Energy Center. Construction began on March 22, 2023 of a 161 megawatt wind energy project in Coconino county. The project was proposed by NextEra Resources, and SRP planned to start delivering power in 2024.
- Chevelon Butte. AES is planning and in construction on a 454 megawatt wind project in Coconino and Navajo counties 20 miles south of Winslow, Arizona. The project is to be completed in two phases. The first 238 megawatt phase was expected to be fully operational before the summer of 2023. The second 216 megawatt phase was expected to be operational in 2024. The second phase turbines are being provided by Vestas, a Danish manufacturer.
- West Camp Wind Farm. AES received approval from the Navajo County board of Supervisors for a 500 megawatt, 104 turbine, wind farm 10 miles south of Joesph City, Arizona. On December 23, 2023, Vestas announced an agreement to build and commission 89 wind turbines. Deliveries were scheduled to begin in the fourth quarter of 2024, with operations expected to start in 2025.

== Small-scale wind power ==
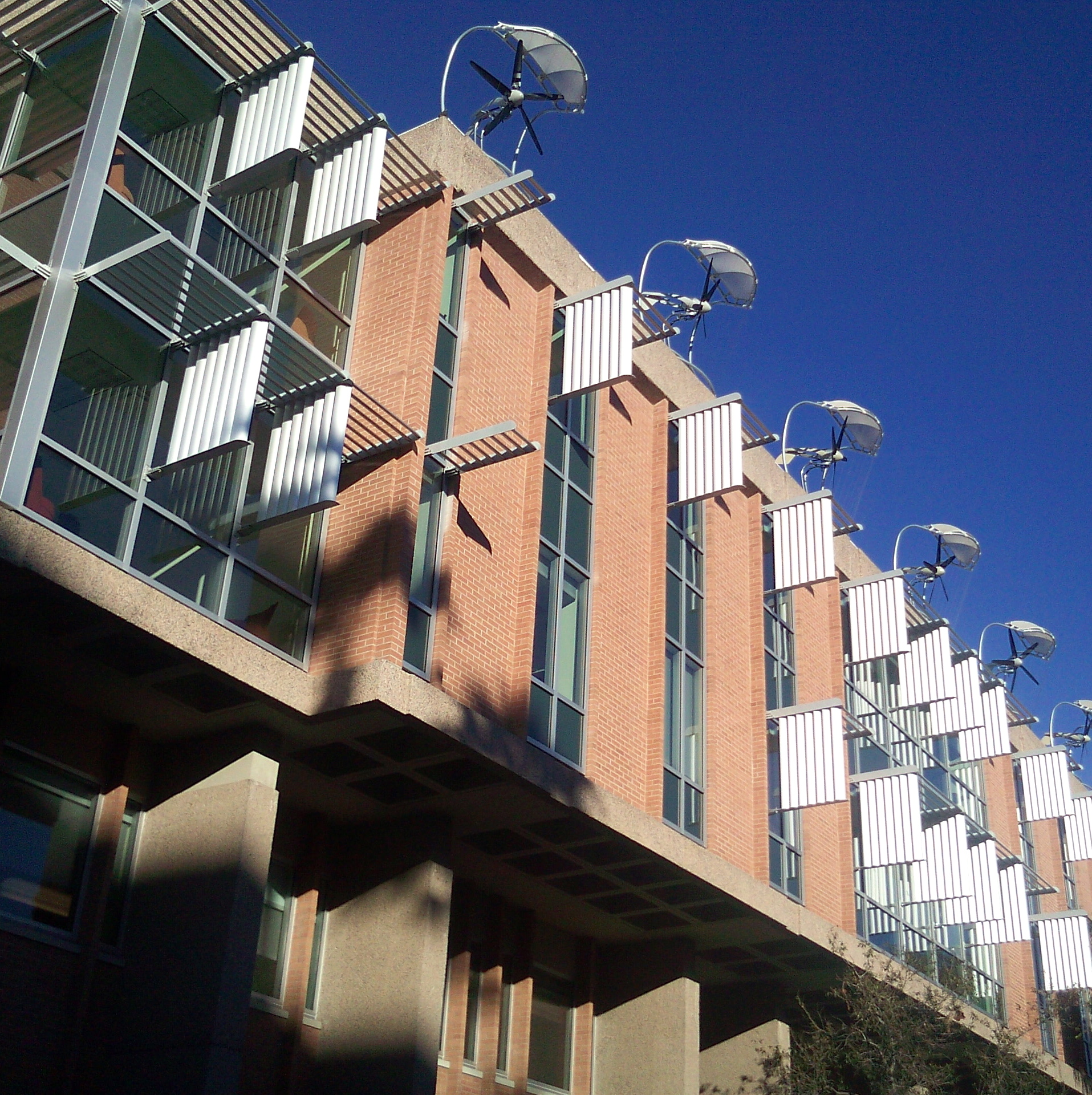
The ASU School of Sustainability

Flagstaff is the home of Southwest Windpower.

The ASU School of Sustainability in Tempe features an array of small wind turbines on its roof, with real-time data available to the public through the ASU Campus Metabolism website.

== Environmental impact ==
According to the USDOE, each 1000 MW of wind power capacity installed in Arizona will annually save 818 million gallons of water and eliminate 2.0 million tons of carbon dioxide emissions.

For comparison, Arizona emitted a total of 101,510,000 tonnes of carbon dioxide in 2007.

== Wind generation ==
Arizona wind generation (GWh, million kWh)
Year	Total	Jan	Feb	Mar	Apr	May	Jun	Jul	Aug	Sep	Oct	Nov	Dec
2009	30										12	8	10
2010	136	6	7	15	14	18	12	7	6	6	9	13	23
2011	255	9	27	31	38	34	33	13	11	9	14	26	10
2012	532	47	47	61	51	59	52	34	30	30	41	32	48
2013	450	31	35	45	55	60	49	24	18	30	41	27	35
2014	467	28	36	43	58	63	62	26	25	23	21	53	29
2015	451	16	35	31	53	44	34	32	29	31	35	56	55
2016	542	42	38	56	50	55	46	46	21	44	51	44	49
2017	570	53	52	54	54	52	39	32	35	36	55	52	56
2018	528	47	43	55	55	41	45	36	38	38	40	44	46
2019	555	48	47	47	50	46	42	43	39	49	48	48	48
2020	643	43	42	59	52	54	60	34	35	31	31	84	118
2021	1,600	126	132	166	157	153	137	111	131	99	123	108	157
2022	1,565	106	150	156	185	186	156	119	63	101	76	153	114
2023	1,733	159	145	180	121	155	152	180	120	147	147	149	77
2024	2,540	126	195	221	191	274	268	218	236	185	193	246	187
2025	3,150	254	296	363	297	281	286	316	261	206	228	158	204

== See also ==
- Index of Arizona-related articles
- List of U.S. states by carbon dioxide emissions
- List of wind farms in the United States
- Outline of Arizona
- Solar power in Arizona
