= ASU Campus Metabolism =

ASU Campus Metabolism (Campus Metabolism) is a website managed by Arizona State University, demonstrating Energy monitoring and targeting through use of real-time and historic energy use data of buildings on the campus in Tempe, Arizona. The site displays data from an Energy Information System in order to support education, research, operations and outreach regarding sustainability of operations on the ASU Tempe campus. The site is part of a plan for the campus to be carbon-neutral by 2025.

== History ==
In 2004, APS Energy Services developed an Energy Information System (EIS) to provide the energy manager and ASU personnel with tools to monitor and manage energy and building use at the Tempe campus. The EIS provided the foundation that was to become the public Campus Metabolism site and continues to aid decision-making regarding improvements and facilities management to reduce use of electricity, natural gas and chilled water.

The Campus Metabolism site was opened to the public on May 15, 2008 as a student project to measure and encourage responsible energy use by building occupants. It expanded with the help of many organizations with an interest in reducing energy use on the Arizona State University campus including the Global Institute of Sustainability, The National Center of Excellence on SMART Innovations under the direction of Dr. Jay Golden, the Herberger Institute for Design and the Arts, Ira A. Fulton School of Engineering, the ASU student chapter of Engineers Without Borders, and APS Energy Services.

Campus Metabolism expanded from 14 buildings in October 2008, to 20 facilities and 21 renewable generation installations in July, 2011. Data from the system has also been used to advise facility management decisions on buildings that do not have energy monitoring systems. Future plans for the site include installation of utility submetering devices in additional buildings, additional campuses, display of metered potable and recycled water use, recycled, non-recyclable waste and the ability to view energy use by floor in multi-story buildings.

The Campus Metabolism website is featured prominently on a kiosk at the entrance to Wrigley Hall of the ASU School of Sustainability at the ASU Tempe campus and is publicly available through the World Wide Web.

== Technology ==
The Energy Information System components throughout campus are connected through a dedicated fiber-optic network, collecting data on energy consumption, temperature, pressure, hot and cold water, and renewable energy generation through rooftop photovoltaic panels and wind turbines. The data is stored in an SQL database. The system is maintained by ASU Facilities Management with support from APS Energy Services. The information is made available through a public interactive tab-based Adobe Flash interface that displays individual building data and related information.

Similar to a home energy monitor, the Campus Metabolism site records and displays energy use, but at a larger scale and includes renewable energy generation. The largest arrays of solar panels on the system are installed on the roofs of parking structures and parking canopies to provide shade for parked cars and due to a lack of vacant land in the area. As of 2011, ASU facilities have a solar generating capacity of 4.7MW, among the largest commercial producers of solar energy in the state of Arizona, with plans to expand to 16MW.

== Site features ==
The Campus Metabolism website begins with animated graphics that relate the function of living organisms to economic processes of urban areas including growth, energy, and elimination of waste. The home page displays overall statistics of campus energy systems, provides links to news and events while cycling through real-time readings from individual buildings. A campus map shows the location of each facility represented in the system with tooltips showing current data for each.

A virtual room feature allows visitors to model energy use in a typical office or campus residence. Clicking on the picture displays an estimated daily usage and monthly cost of energy for each appliance in the room.

A “Select Building” tab allows visitors to see usage of each individual building, compare buildings, or display a summary of renewable energy generation. Individual building displays include historical data in the form of time-based graphs that compare current use to the previous day, month or year. The data used to generate the graphs can also be downloaded to a .csv file.

Building complexes, such as the Barrett Honors College are set up to allow visitors to view overall data for the complex or detailed information for each building. The Structure Comparison page displays a bar graph comparing energy use of each building in the system, and the change in use. It also provides the ability to download data for further analysis.

A weather sub-site includes an interactive page to view and download weather data, which is displayed and accessible through the navigation bar at the top of the page. Weather data allows a visitor to relate energy use to factors such as outdoor temperature, wind and humidity at the campus.

== References in Media ==
The site has been featured in the State Press, an independent student paper, in October 2008, and referenced as a case study by APS Energy Services. The site is part of energy auditing and management systems that are estimated to save over 94 million kiloWatt-hours of electricity and over 1.4 million therms, which is comparable to the energy in 8.5 million US gallons (32,000 m^{3}) of gasoline.

A photo essay by The Arizona Republic of the rededication of the Global Institute of Sustainability in 2008 features photos of a Campus Metabolism kiosk in the lobby of the building along with the project leader, Joby Carlson, an ASU research engineer.

== Recognition ==
Campus Metabolism has been recognized by the National Wildlife Federation for Environmental Education or Outreach.

== See also ==
- Sustainability
- Global warming
- Energy
