= Cholla Power Plant =

Coal power plant in Navajo County, Arizona

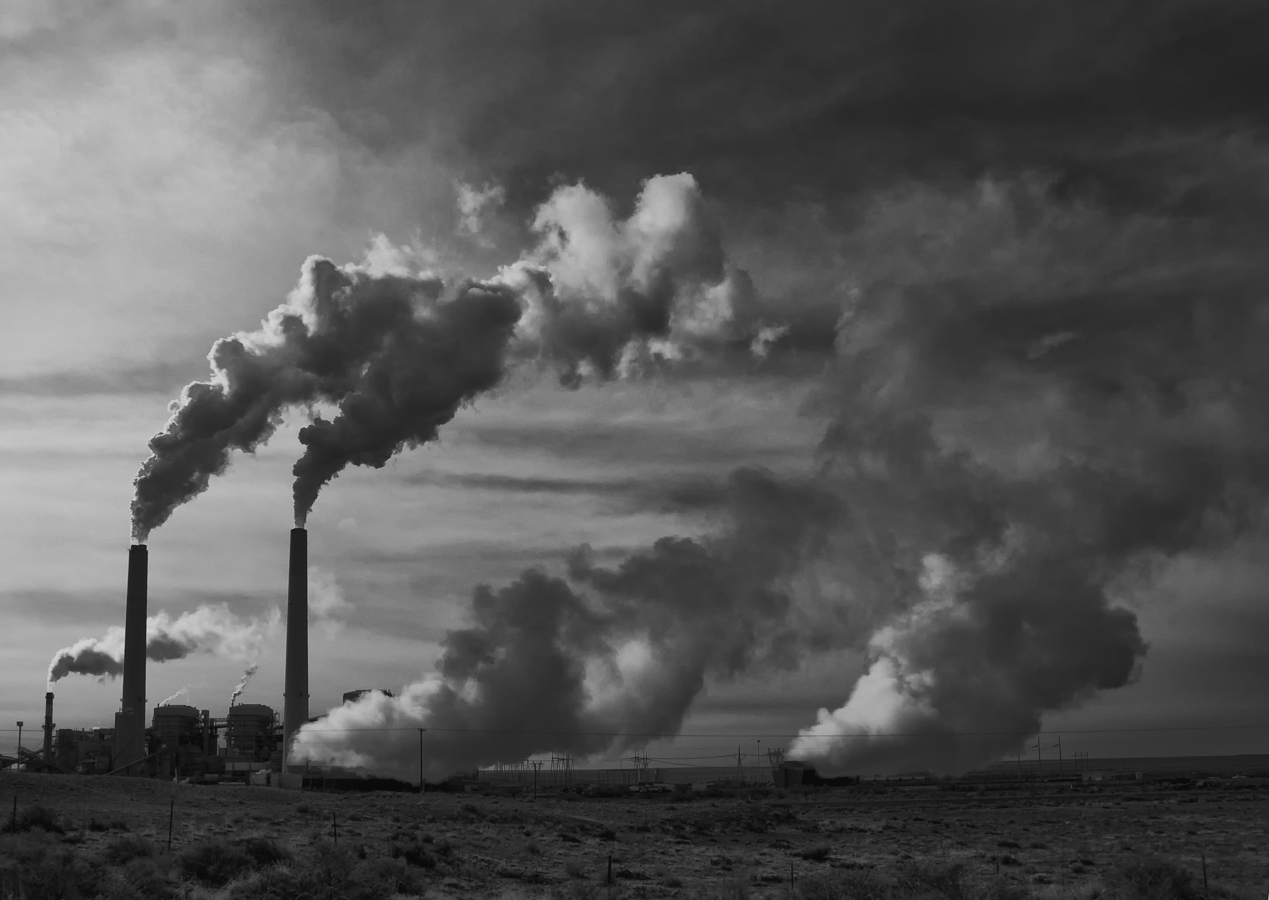
- Country: United States
- Location: Joseph City, Arizona
- Coordinates: 34°56′25″N 110°18′01″W
- Status: Operational
- Commission date: Unit 1: 1962; Unit 2: 1978; Unit 3: 1980; Unit 4: 1981
- Decommission date: Unit 2: 2016; Unit 4: 2020; Units 1 & 3: 2025
- Owners: Units 1–3: Arizona Public Service; Unit 4: PacifiCorp

Thermal power station
- Primary fuel: Subbituminous coal
- Turbine technology: Steam turbine
- Cooling source: Artificial Cholla Lake

Power generation
- Nameplate capacity: 1,021 MW

External links
- Commons: Related media on Commons

The Cholla Power Plant was a 1.02-gigawatt (1,021 MW), coal power plant near Joseph City, Arizona, United States. The plant is jointly owned by Arizona Public Service (APS) and PacifiCorp. The plant began operations in 1962. Generating units 2 and 4 were retired 2015 and 2020, respectively, while Units 1 and 3 were retired in 2025.

== History ==
The coal burned at the plant came mostly from the McKinley Mine, located east of Window Rock, Arizona, in New Mexico, until the mine was closed in 2009 after its reserves being leased were exhausted. In 2010, the Environmental Protection Agency (EPA) notified Cholla that pollution controls were needed for Units 2 through 4. Unit 2 was retired in 2016 as the cost to add pollution controls outweighed the benefits. The remaining units were to be either retired or converted to burn another fuel source by 2025. In January 2020, it was announced that PacifiCorp would close unit 4 by the end of the year. APS announced that while a conversion to natural gas had been an option, it was no longer being considered. A proposal was put forth to convert a unit to burn biomass, however regulators at the Arizona Corporation Commission voted down that plan in 2019.

In March 2025, APS retired the remaining two units at Cholla. Even though an executive order by the Trump Administration was signed to prevent further closures of coal plants the following month, including Cholla by name, APS evaluated and kept the plant shuttered. The plant would have required $2 billion in investment to bring the facility back online according to a state regulator.

Plans to convert two units to natural gas were announced in July 2026. The estimated completion date is 2029.

=== Units ===
The plant consisted of the following units:

Unit	Nameplate capacity (MWe)	Commissioning	Notes
1	113.6	1962	Retired in March 2025
2	288.9	1978	Retired April 2016
3	312.3	1980	Retired in March 2025
4	414	1981	Retired December 24, 2020

== See also ==
- List of power stations in Arizona
