= Dry Lake Wind Power Project =

Wind farm in Arizona, US

- Country: United States
- Location: between Holbrook and Heber, Arizona
- Coordinates: 34°38′N 110°13′W
- Status: Operational
- Commission date: October 2009
- Owner: Iberdrola Renewables
- Operator: Avangrid

Wind farm
- Type: Onshore

Power generation
- Units operational: 61 turbines
- Make and model: Suzlon S88-2.1 MW
- Nameplate capacity: 128.1 MW
- Capacity factor: 20.7% (average 2011–2017)
- Annual net output: 232 GW·h

The Dry Lake Wind Power Project in Navajo County is the first utility-scale wind farm in the U.S. state of Arizona. Starting in 2009, it was constructed in two phases having a total generating capacity of 128.1 megawatts (MW), and is selling the electricity to the Salt River Power District (SRP).

== History ==
Around 2003, rancher Bill Elkins began working with developer John Gaglioti and Northern Arizona University scientists to erect measurement towers on his land to measure wind speeds. He studied the local power grid to determine the feasibility of connecting a wind farm. Navajo County and Iberdrola officials credit Gaglioti and Elkins with attracting the first wind farm to Arizona.

== Project details ==
Phase 1 (34°39′36″N 110°17′03″W) consists of 30 Suzlon 2.1 MW wind turbines, for a total nameplate capacity of 63 MW. Iberdrola Renewables built the wind farm for $100 million. Based on wind measurements before construction began, Iberdrola estimated phase 1 would produce an average of 132,450 MWh annually. Depending on actual performance of phase 1, the company planned to install up to 209 more turbines in future construction phases.

Phase 2 (34°36′22″N 110°10′24″W) consists of 31 additional Suzlon turbines for a combined nameplate capacity of 65.1 MW. The location of phase 2 is about seven miles (11 km) northwest of Snowflake and three miles (4.8 km) southeast of phase 1.

== Electricity production ==
Dry Lake Wind Project Electricity Generation (MW·h)
Year	Dry Lake 1 (63 MW)	Dry Lake 2 (65.1 MW)	Total Annual MW·h
2009	29,545*	–	29,545
2010	118,777	16,139*	134,916
2011	124,401	124,330	248,731
2012	112,688	114,097	226,785
2013	107,393	110,934	218,327
2014	117,246	121,525	238,771
2015	104,882	107,261	212,143
2016	112,321	116,380	228,701
2017	123,484	127,022	250,506
Average Annual Production (years 2011-2017) --->			231,995
Average Capacity Factor (years 2011–2017) --->			20.7%

(*) partial year of operation

== Environmental effect ==
According to the USDOE, each 1000 MW of wind power capacity installed in Arizona will save 818 million US gallons (3,100,000 m^{3}) of water per year and eliminate 2.0 million tons of carbon dioxide emissions. Phase 1 of Dry Lake Wind Power Project would then eliminate:

$\frac{2,000,000 \mbox{ tons} \times 63 \mbox{ MW}}{1000 \mbox{ MW}} = 126,000 \mbox{ tons}$

of carbon dioxide, and save:

$\frac{818,000,000 \mbox{ gallons} \times 63 \mbox{ MW}}{1000 \mbox{ MW}} = 51,534,000 \mbox{ gallons}$

of water annually.

== See also ==
- Wind power in Arizona
