= Apache Generating Station =

Coal power plant in Cochise, Arizona

- Country: United States
- Location: Cochise, Arizona
- Coordinates: 32°3′34″N 109°53′22″W
- Status: Operational
- Owner: Arizona Electric Power Cooperative (AEPCO)

Thermal power station
- Primary fuel: Subbituminous coal and natural gas
- Turbine technology: Steam turbine

Power generation
- Nameplate capacity: 408 MW

The Apache Power Plant is a 626-megawatt coal power plant and natural gas powered plant near Willcox, Arizona, United States, about 80 miles east of Tucson, Arizona. The plant is jointly owned by Arizona Electric Power Cooperative (AEPCO). The plant began operations in 1964.

In 2024, owner AEPCO announced that by 2027 they planned to stop using coal and only use natural gas to power the plant.

It has been using solar energy since 2025.

== See also ==
- List of power stations in Arizona
