= North Carolina Solar Center =

- Abbreviation: NCSC
- Founded: 1988
- Type: Energy technical assistance and services
- Purpose: The North Carolina Solar Center advances a sustainable energy economy by educating, demonstrating, and providing support for clean energy technologies, practices, and policies.
- Headquarters: N.C. State University
- Location: 1575 Varsity Drive Raleigh, NC 27606
- Director: Steve Kalland
- Affiliations: The College of Engineering at N.C. State University; N.C. Department of Commerce
- Website: www.ncsc.ncsu.edu

The North Carolina Solar Center is a resource center for sustainable energy programs and is located at North Carolina State University in Raleigh, North Carolina. It was created in 1988 with the center's focus on solar energy. The North Carolina Solar Center became known as the North Carolina Clean Energy Technology Center in 2014.

== See also ==
- Arizona Solar Center
- Florida Solar Energy Center
