= Solana Generating Station =

Solar thermal power station in Arizona

Solana Generating Station Project
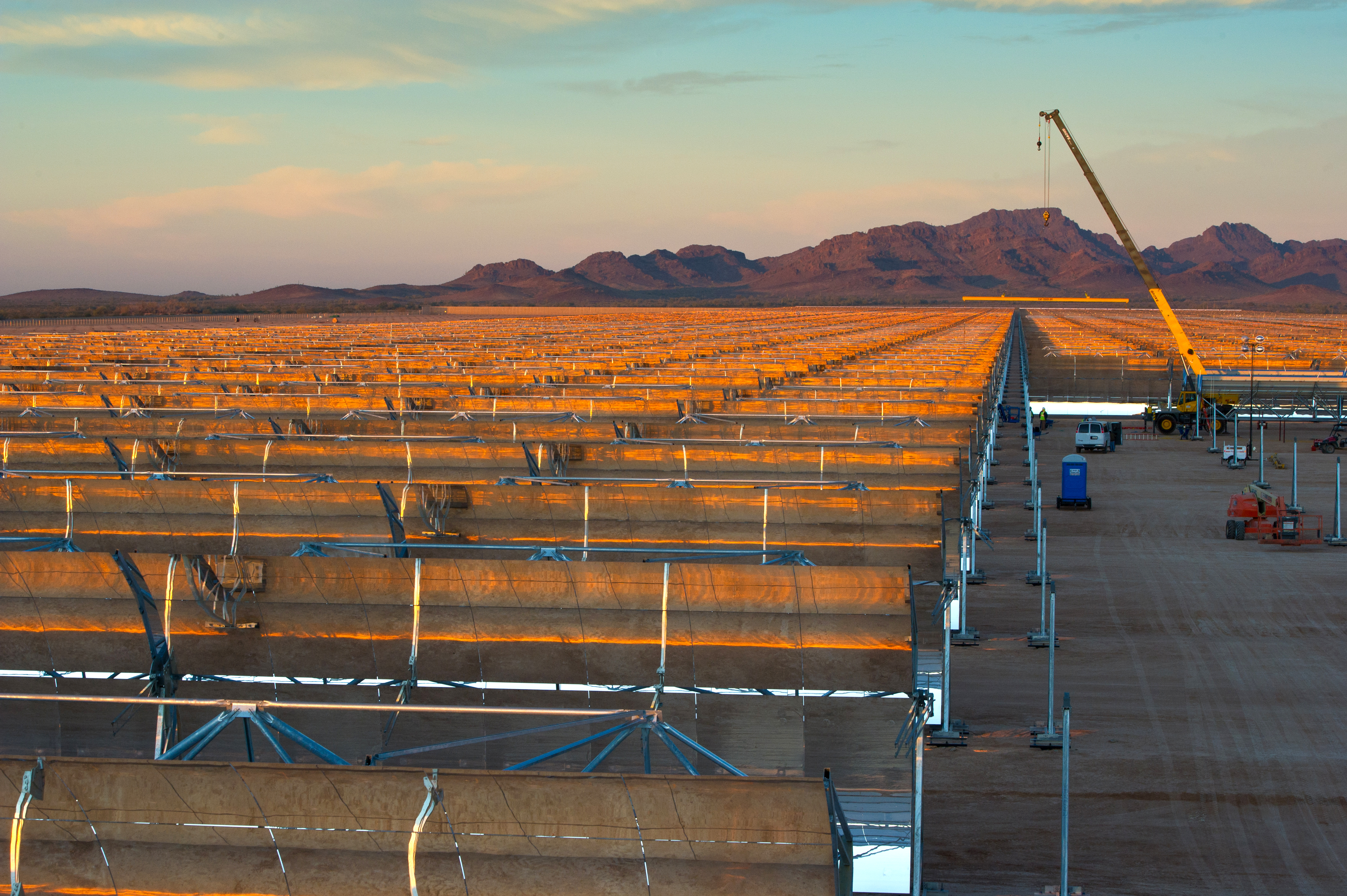
- The project's array of parabolic mirrors
- Country: United States
- Location: Maricopa County, Arizona
- Coordinates: 32°55′N 112°58′W
- Status: Operational
- Construction began: December 2010
- Commission date: 2013
- Construction cost: US$2 billion
- Owners: Atlantica Sustainable Infrastructure; Liberty Interactive Corporation
- Operator: Arizona Solar One LLC

Solar farm
- Type: CSP
- CSP technology: Parabolic trough
- Collectors: 3,232
- Total collector area: 2,233,958 square metres (552.023 acres)
- Site area: 1,920 acres (780 ha)

Power generation
- Units operational: 2
- Make and model: Siemens
- Nameplate capacity: 250 MW
- Capacity factor: 33.9% (2016-2020)
- Annual net output: 742 GW·h
- Storage capacity: 1,500 MW·h_{e}

External links
- Website: www.atlantica.com
- Commons: Related media on Commons

The Solana Generating Station is a solar power plant near Gila Bend, Arizona, about 70 miles (110 km) southwest of Phoenix. It was completed in 2013. When commissioned, it was the largest parabolic trough plant in the world, and the first U.S. solar plant with molten salt thermal energy storage. Built by the Spanish company Abengoa Solar, the project can produce up to 280 megawatts (MW) gross, supplied by two 140 MW gross (125 MW net) steam turbine generators: enough electricity to meet the needs of approximately 70,000 homes and obviate the emission of roughly 475,000 tons of CO_{2} every year. Its name is the Spanish term for "sunny spot".

== Technology ==
The plant employs a proprietary concentrating solar power (CSP) trough technology developed by Abengoa, and covers an area of 1,920 acres (780 ha). Construction was expected to create about 1,500 construction jobs with the plant employing 85 full-time workers. Solar thermal plants use substantially more water for cooling than other solar generating technologies. Nevertheless, the Sierra Club supported the Solana plant, because it was built on private land, and was projected to use "75 to 85 percent less water than the current agricultural use."

== Economics ==
Arizona Public Service (APS) has contracted to purchase 100% of the power output generated from Solana, to meet the Arizona Corporation Commission's (ACC) mandate that the state's regulated utilities provide 15% of their electricity from renewable energy sources by 2025. APS will pay about 14 cents per kWh. The Solana plant was originally planned to open in 2011 and was estimated to cost $2 billion. In December 2010, Abengoa received a $1.45 billion loan guarantee to support construction of the plant.

== Energy storage ==
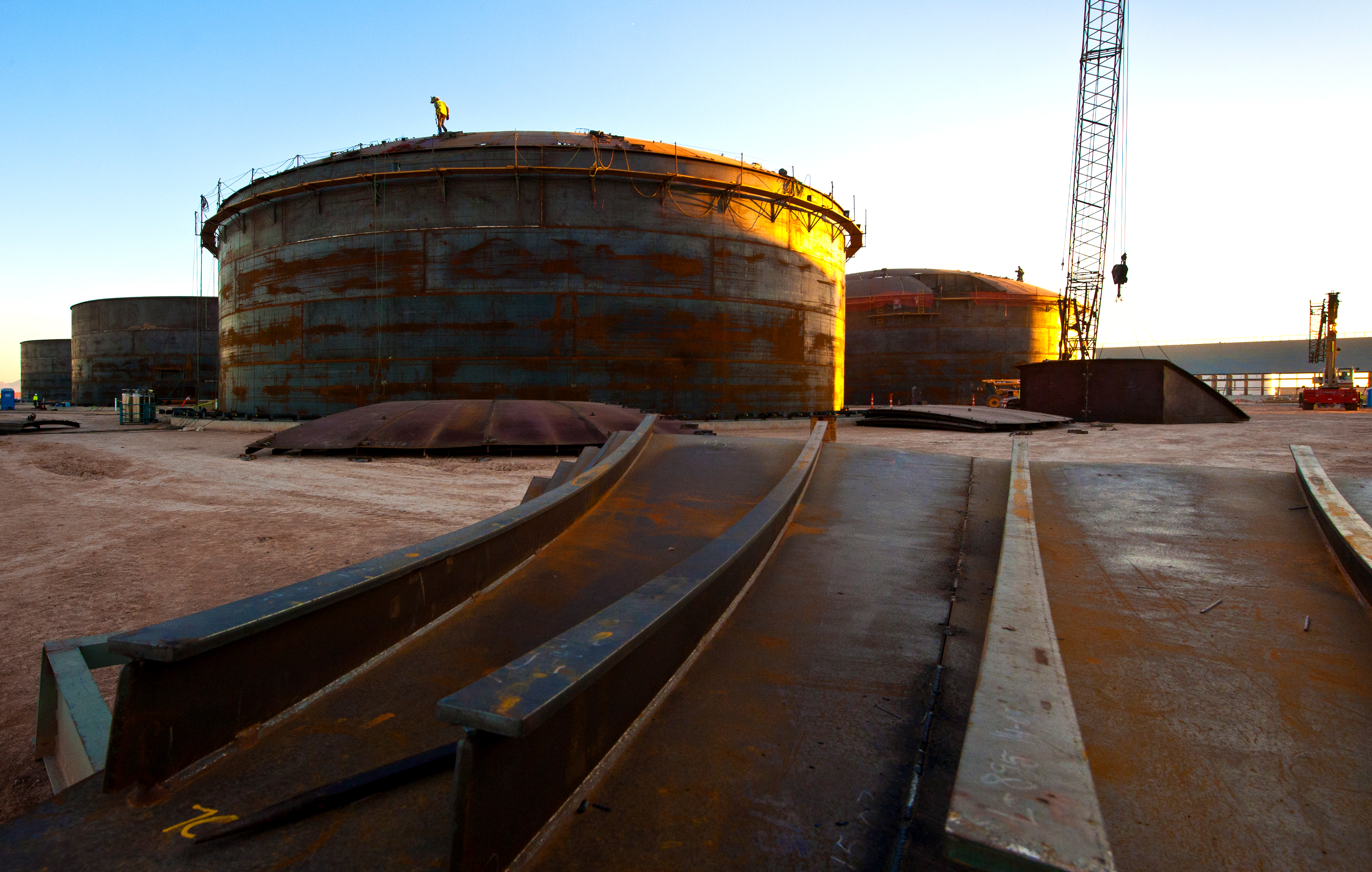
Construction of the Salt Tanks

One of the principal advantages of concentrated solar thermal (CST) is that thermal energy storage can be provided efficiently, so that output can be provided after the sun goes down, and output can be scheduled to meet demand requirements. The Solana Generating Station is designed to provide six hours of energy storage. This allows the plant to generate about 38 percent of its rated capacity over the course of a year.

== Production ==
Solana Generating Station's production is as follows, averaging 742 GW·h annual, yielding about 390 MW·h/acre.

Generation (MW·h) of Solana Generating Station
Year	Jan	Feb	Mar	Apr	May	Jun	Jul	Aug	Sep	Oct	Nov	Dec	Total
2013									0	45,230	23,839	20,179	89,248
2014	29,945	31,825	49,358	50,325	75,221	78,231	59,276	52,191	63,406	62,693	33,735	17,361	603,567
2015	12,165	27,259	51,698	82,237	88,122	91,097	86,217	91,475	63,135	49,469	46,262	29,707	718,843
2016	33,173	37,399	51,744	57,353	88,255	88,994	84,981	42,855	51,387	50,595	35,073	21,861	643,670
2017	22,550	34,934	78,837	89,629	86,648	115,921	23,376	63,812	81,571	72,194	30,596	23,898	723,966
2018	33,078	38,661	48,242	68,419	106,877	106,604	87,204	87,032	90,027	54,029	41,303	14,537	776,013
2019	29,041	26,957	61,997	88,945	91,002	111,993	89,483	99,268	71,398	76,043	25,171	20,344	791,642
2020	36,881	48,874	54,253	86,121	93,620	87,416	87,894	80,561	69,190	64,892	36,296	29,706	775,704
2021	31,755	49,018	63,361	72,935	93,529	84,753	51,704	69,147	61,726	56,456	38,140	22,045	694,569
2022	27,276	33,320	60,001	77,812	90,752	86,385	65,401	72,113	68,446	67,573	24,905	21,661	695,645
2023	23,713	32,892	49,085	87,941	95,552	105,457	87,937	79,071	75,596	71,022	39,102	27,355	774,723
Total (2013-2023)													7,287,590

Maximum annual electricity production was projected at 900,000 MW·h (900 GW·h), as calculated using the project's and NREL specific capacity factors. In 2020, Solana Generating Station has averaged 82.4% of the projected production value. Nearby photovoltaic power station Agua Caliente, covering a larger site area of 2400 acres, had a Loan Programs Office projected generation of only 559 GW·h (instead yielding an average real 727 GW·h production).

== Operations issues ==
The plant opened in 2014 and has experienced some problems since its opening. In the summer of 2017, the plant had two transformer fires. Maricopa County environmental officials questioned whether the plant violated air pollution standards, and in 2016, fined the plant $1.5 million for violations of air quality standards. According to the Phoenix New Times, "The plant’s parent company, a subsidiary of Abengoa called Atlantica Yield, downplayed the issues, and a company representative said that better times are likely ahead."

According to government documents, the plant is expected to produce 900,000 MWh every year. This amount of electricity could power about 65,000 typical homes in Arizona. However, the plant produced only 600,000 MWh in its first full year of operation, according to information from the Federal Energy Information Administration. In 2015, the output increased to 700,000 MWh. In the summer of 2017, a microburst "knocked out the plant that July." but notwithstanding that, generation reached 723,966 MWh.

A CSP thermal power block is like that of a coal or gas-fired plant, except its fuel is sunlight and require up to four years to ramp-up to 100% operating level.

== See also ==
- Energy storage
- List of energy storage projects
- Solar power in Arizona
- SEGS, nine solar power plants in California's Mojave Desert.
