= Arizona Solar Center =

Educational organization

- Formation: 1999
- Legal status: Non-Profit Association – 501(c)6
- Purpose: Information and Education
- Website: www.azsolarcenter.org

The Arizona Solar Center (AzSC) was established in 1999 to increase public and professional understanding of solar energy, especially as it pertains to Arizona. Currently registered with the IRS as a 501(c)(6) non-profit organization, the Center is administered by a board of directors with a wide range of experience and training in solar energy and other renewable energy resources. Sponsors include utility companies, other related non-profit organizations and a number of private companies. This wide representation enables the center to remain largely neutral with respect to policy and legislation in Arizona.

Some aims of the center include aggregating core information about solar energy in Arizona, providing updates about the Arizona solar energy community, identifying available resources, services and equipment, and highlighting developments in solar and related industries. Many of these functions are carried out through its website.

The center and its website are widely referenced as a primary source for many topics relating to solar in Arizona. The website's articles on solar architecture and solar thermal technology are especially unique and commonly referenced outside of Arizona as well.

== See also ==
- Solar power in Arizona
