= Mesquite Solar project =

Solar power plant in Maricopa County, Arizona

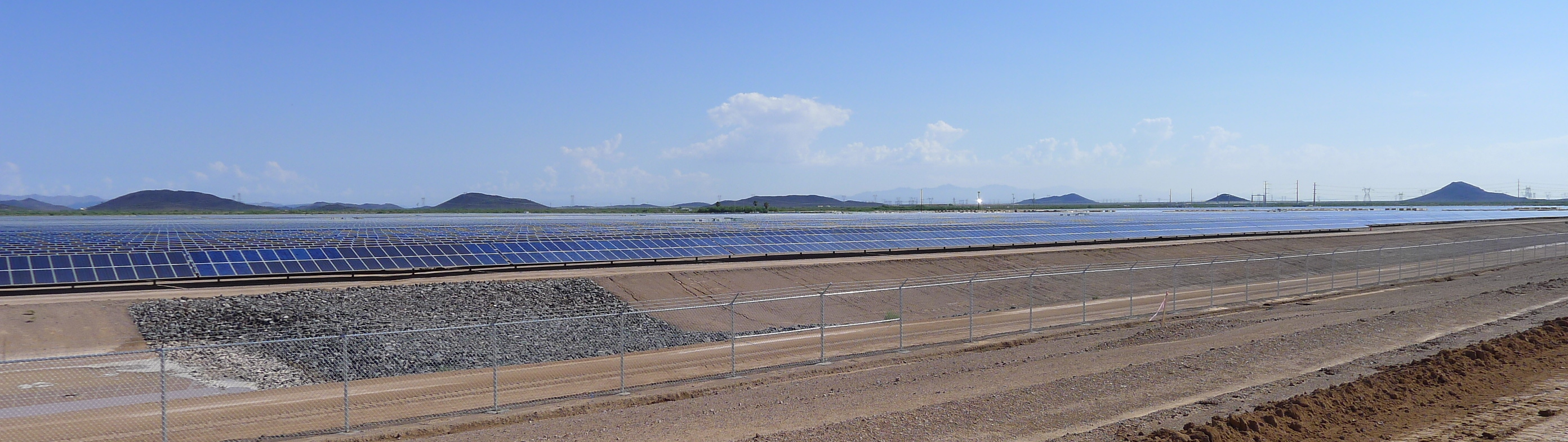
- Country: United States
- Location: Arlington, Arizona
- Coordinates: 33°20′N 112°55′W
- Status: Operational
- Owner: Sempra Generation

Solar farm
- Type: Flat-panel PV

Power generation
- Nameplate capacity: 512.5 MW_{AC}
- Capacity factor: 32.3% (average 2017–2019)
- Annual net output: 1,133 GW·h, 493 MW·h/acre (pre–2023)

The Mesquite Solar project is a 512.5-megawatt (MW_{AC}) photovoltaic power plant in Arlington, Maricopa County, Arizona, owned by Sempra Generation and Consolidated Edison Development Inc. The first three phases of the project were constructed using more than 2.1 million crystalline silicon solar panels made by Suntech Power. Mesquite 4 and 5 added another 112.5 MW and 70 MW of battery storage.

== Project details ==
Construction of Phase 1 over a 3.6 km^{2} site adjacent the Palo Verde Nuclear Generating Station began in 2011 and was completed in January 2013. It has a nameplate capacity of 150 megawatts (MW) that is contracted through a 20-year Power Purchase Agreement (PPA) with Pacific Gas and Electric Company (PG&E). The EPC contractor was Zachry Holdings. Phase 1 cost about $600 million, is projected to generate more than 350 gigawatt-hours of electricity annually (an average of about 40 MW), and will offset roughly 200,000 tons of carbon emissions each year.

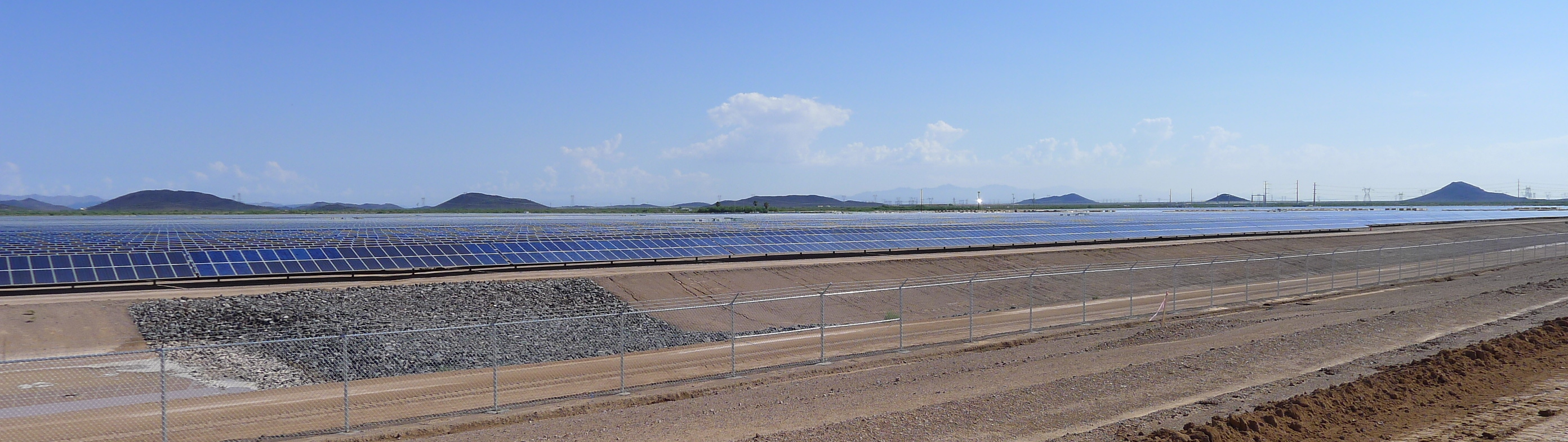
Mesquite Solar One (August 2012)

Phase 2 (100MW) and Phase 3 (150MW) were both completed in December 2016. The panels are mounted on single-axis trackers to increase electricity production.

Mesquite 4 is a 52.5 MW solar farm with 10 MW of batteries. Mesquite 5 is a 60 MW solar farm with 60 MW of batteries. Mesquite 4 came online in January 2024 while Mesquite 5 came online in July 2023.

== Electricity production ==
Total Facility Generation (Annual Sum from All Units Below)
Year	Total Annual MW·h
2011	2,956
2012	233,105
2013	413,611
2014	408,218
2015	397,599
2016	442,565
2017	1,145,231
2018	1,145,816
2019	1,109,029
Average (2017–2019)	1,133,359

Generation (MW·h) of Mesquite Solar 1 (150MW)
Year	Jan	Feb	Mar	Apr	May	Jun	Jul	Aug	Sep	Oct	Nov	Dec	Total
2011											1,711	1,245	2,956
2012	6,830	8,261	10,848	14,729	20,300	20,717	22,784	26,070	25,060	27,809	25,008	24,689	233,105
2013	26,897	31,203	35,698	37,963	39,751	39,487	38,113	36,261	35,489	38,806	27,362	26,581	413,611
2014	29,466	28,570	39,157	40,084	42,765	40,304	37,138	35,717	34,451	32,627	27,236	20,703	408,218
2015	20,029	30,905	37,089	40,474	40,419	37,689	35,962	36,967	33,285	31,139	29,199	24,442	397,599
2016	23,919	32,350	36,412	37,321	42,442	39,309	38,869	38,069	33,660	34,753	28,321	22,825	408,250
2017	18,968	23,127	39,542	43,048	45,896	51,628	31,943	39,425	40,513	37,184	22,096	20,363	413,734
2018	23,598	25,234	32,580	38,786	48,925	47,774	42,202	42,713	41,106	29,406	25,482	17,198	415,004
2019	21,519	21,215	33,843	40,244	42,179	47,752	42,113	45,612	36,747	37,825	21,338	16,959	407,345

Generation (MW·h) of Mesquite Solar 2 (100MW with tracking)
Year	Jan	Feb	Mar	Apr	May	Jun	Jul	Aug	Sep	Oct	Nov	Dec	Total
2016												13,255	13,255
2017	15,016	16,794	26,698	29,176	31,992	32,486	29,490	28,681	26,392	23,857	15,275	15,040	290,897
2018	17,201	18,569	24,484	28,562	32,739	31,729	29,461	29,075	26,015	16,891	15,900	14,396	285,023
2019	16,090	14,280	19,916	21,340	22,983	30,941	29,656	29,898	23,634	23,723	13,615	9,971	256,047

Generation (MW·h) of Mesquite Solar 3 (150MW with tracking)
Year	Jan	Feb	Mar	Apr	May	Jun	Jul	Aug	Sep	Oct	Nov	Dec	Total
2016												21,060	21,060
2017	22,673	25,705	40,558	43,985	48,952	49,978	44,174	43,447	39,846	35,670	23,425	22,187	440,600
2018	25,678	28,450	38,984	43,517	50,609	48,203	44,817	44,342	39,830	31,777	27,684	21,898	445,789
2019	25,460	26,613	38,070	43,410	47,869	48,938	45,483	45,652	39,165	39,109	25,772	20,096	445,637

== See also ==
- Solar power in Arizona
