= Agua Caliente Solar Project =

Photovoltaic power station in Arizona, United States

- Country: United States
- Location: Yuma County, Arizona
- Coordinates: 32°58′00″N 113°30′00″W
- Status: Operational
- Construction began: 2011
- Commission date: April, 2014
- Construction cost: $1.8 billion
- Owners: NRG Energy and BHE Renewables
- Operator: Agua Caliente Solar

Solar farm
- Type: Flat-panel PV fixed tilt
- Site area: 2,400 acres (971 ha)

Power generation
- Units operational: 5.2 million First Solar panels
- Nameplate capacity: 290 MW_{AC}
- Capacity factor: 27.85% (2012-2022)
- Annual net output: 707 GW·h

External links
- Website: Agua Caliente Solar Project

The Agua Caliente Solar Project is a 290 megawatt (MW_{AC}) photovoltaic power station, built in Yuma County, Arizona using 5.2 million cadmium telluride modules made by the U.S. thin-film manufacturer First Solar. It was the largest solar facility in the world when the project was commissioned in April 2014.

== History ==
39 MW was online as of December 2011 and 100 MW was completed as of April 2012. 200 MW was completed as of July 2012, and 247 MW in August 2012, when the 10th section was completed. The addition of more panels has halted until 2013, with crates of panels covered to protect them. Full power was achieved ahead of schedule in September 2013.

== Project overview ==
In August 2011, the Department of Energy finalized a $967 million loan guarantee for the project. The project sponsor, NRG Solar, estimated the photovoltaic generation facility would fund approximately 400 construction jobs and 16 full-time operating jobs, and would become one of the largest plants of its kind in the world when completed. The power produced is being sold to PG&E (Pacific Gas & Electric) in California in a 25-year Power Purchase Agreement.

The Series 3 thin film panels use CdS/CdTe, and are rated from 77 watts to 82.5 watts each, and are mounted at a fixed tilt angle. 20,940 are connected in each array, rated at 1.26 MW_{AC}. 400 SMA 720CP inverters were initially foreseen, but in the end 500 SMA 630CP are used. Installed modules total power is 410 megawatt-peak (MW_{DC}).

== Award ==
In February 2012, Agua Caliente competed in the Excellence in Renewable Energy Awards and won the Project of the Year Award.

== Electricity production ==
Agua Caliente Solar Project's production is as follows, averaging 727 GW·h annual, yielding about 300 MW·h/acre.

Generation (MW·h) of Agua Caliente Solar Project
Year	Jan	Feb	Mar	Apr	May	Jun	Jul	Aug	Sep	Oct	Nov	Dec	Total
2012				2,830	41,750	49,640	50,440	52,650	54,140	52,830	41,780	33,535	379,595
2013	34,138	45,555	53,720	61,050	64,998	65,452	63,631	61,470	64,870	64,605	48,294	47,742	675,525
2014	50,790	50,560	66,490	69,912	74,990	73,533	71,022	67,401	63,912	60,676	55,189	36,706	741,181
2015	46,007	54,670	65,495	70,829	72,742	69,880	69,307	70,319	60,023	56,974	54,110	49,378	739,734
2016	49,412	58,327	67,227	66,997	75,385	69,159	73,136	69,135	60,662	60,662	50,348	43,083	743,533
2017	47,671	46,840	67,082	68,626	72,991	72,219	68,464	68,565	63,263	61,654	45,679	45,686	728,740
2018	50,151	50,877	63,711	67,512	74,187	69,705	64,469	69,550	63,477	56,043	51,746	41,896	723,324
2019	45,979	46,912	62,930	67,181	71,999	71,168	66,646	70,400	62,679	64,270	47,119	38,884	716,167
2020	49,620	52,221	57,708	68,379	73,737	69,996	70,568	65,616	61,024	59,763	50,358	45,691	724,681
2021	46,227	53,137	65,148	67,831	72,821	68,257	60,813	65,283	59,998	59,660	46,886	40,850	706,961
2022	48,791	54,701	66,316	69,257	72,959	67,571	63,552	65,797	60,029	58,360	56,538	42,809	726,680
2023	43,006	46,985	44,061	68,474	73,180	70,933	67,573	64,198	60,919	60,648	48,195	43,162	691,334
2024	43,048	48,098	58,102	52,014	66,471	61,149	66,918	65,268	62,138	53,153	38,237	41,455	656,051
2025	42,759	18,382	23,745	35,414	44,131	58,244	69,241	66,505	56,890	48,670	42,749	40,186	546,916
2026	43,120	32,487	28,824										
Total													9,500,422

The Loan Programs Office projected annual generation, calculated using the project's and NREL Technology specific capacity factors, was of 559 GW·h. Sector estimates predicted an average production of about 626 GW·h each year.

== See also ==
- Arizona Solar Center
- Solar power in Arizona
