= McKinley Mine =

Coal mine in New Mexico, United States

Coordinates: 35°40′12″N 108°59′31″W

McKinley Mine was an open-pit coal mine, owned by Chevron Corporation (formerly Pittsburg & Midway Coal Company), and located in McKinley County, New Mexico. The mine closed in 2009.
