= Iberdrola Renovables =

Spanish energy company

- Company type: Sociedad Anónima Unipersonal
- Traded as: BMAD:IBR
- Industry: Renewable energy
- Founded: 2001
- Defunct: July 11, 2011
- Fate: Merged with Iberdrola
- Headquarters: Valencia, Spain
- Key people: Ignacio Galán (president); Xavier Viteri (CEO)
- Parent: Iberdrola

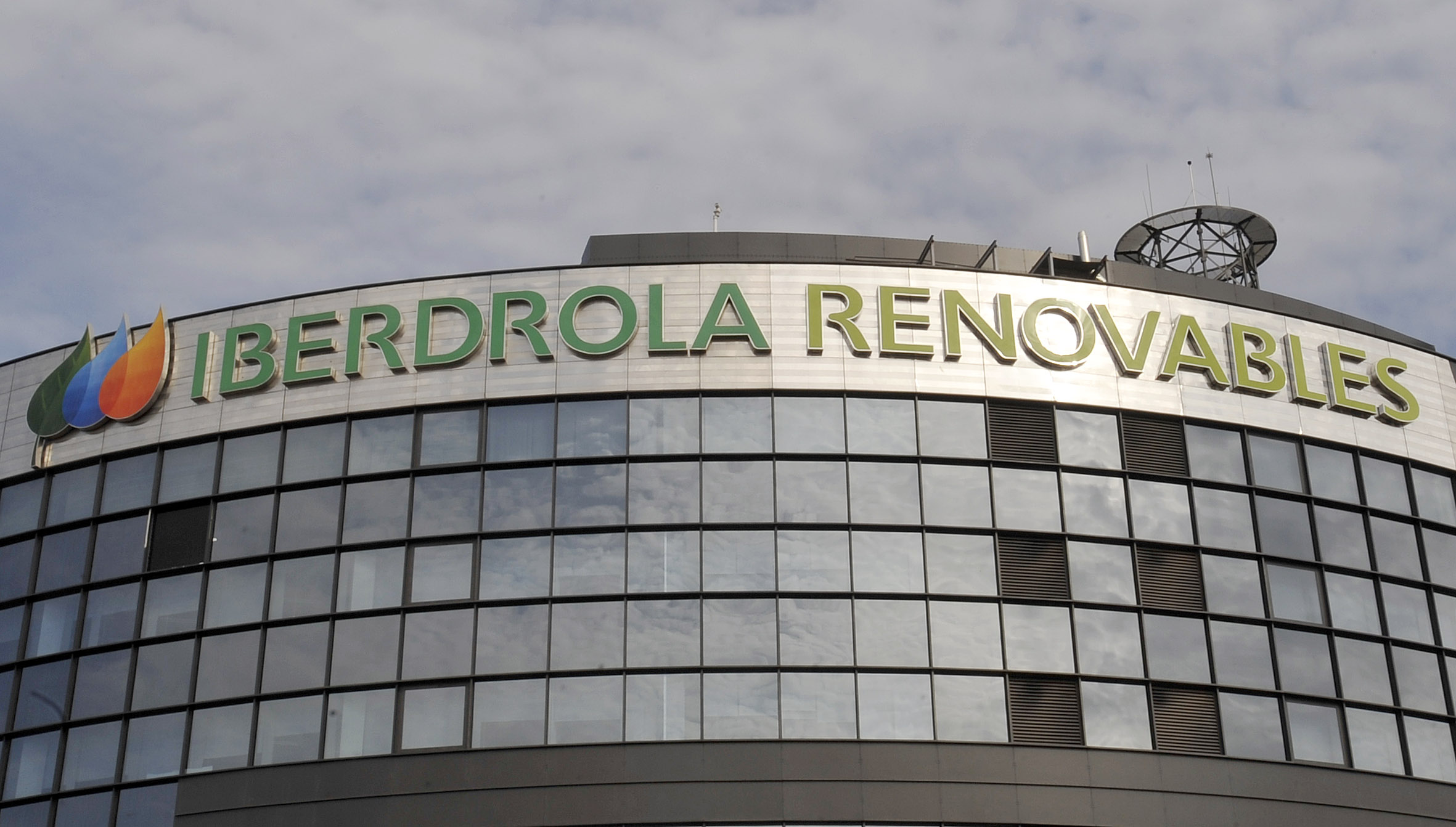

Iberdrola Renovables was a subsidiary of Iberdrola, headquartered in Valencia, Spain, which included companies in the domains of renewable energy, particularly wind power. The firm was the world's largest renewable energy firm: it was the world's largest owner-operator of wind farms, but also operated in the solar, hydro, biomass and wave power industries.

== History ==
Iberdrola Renovables was registered in Madrid following its incorporation in 2001. It started as a wholly owned business unit of Iberdrola under the name Iberenova. In 2009 the company changed its registered office to Valencia. However, it still had a strong presence in Madrid and in Bilbao, its birthplace.

=== Flotation ===
The company was listed on the Madrid Stock Exchange in December 2007 in an initial public offering. 844,812,980 new shares were placed at a price of €5.30 each. The operation totalled €5 billion, the largest placement ever made on the Spanish market by a new company.

The company joined the benchmark IBEX 35 index in a February 2008 reshuffle.

=== Merger with Iberdrola ===
In July 2011, Iberdrola Renovables merged with its parent company Iberdrola and is now Iberdrola's renewable energy business. Minority shareholders could change their shares into Iberdrola shares at a 1 for 2 ratio, equivalent to a value of around €3 for each share of Iberdrola Renovables.

== See also ==
- Enel Green Power
