= Solar power in Arizona =

Overview of solar power in the U.S. state of Arizona

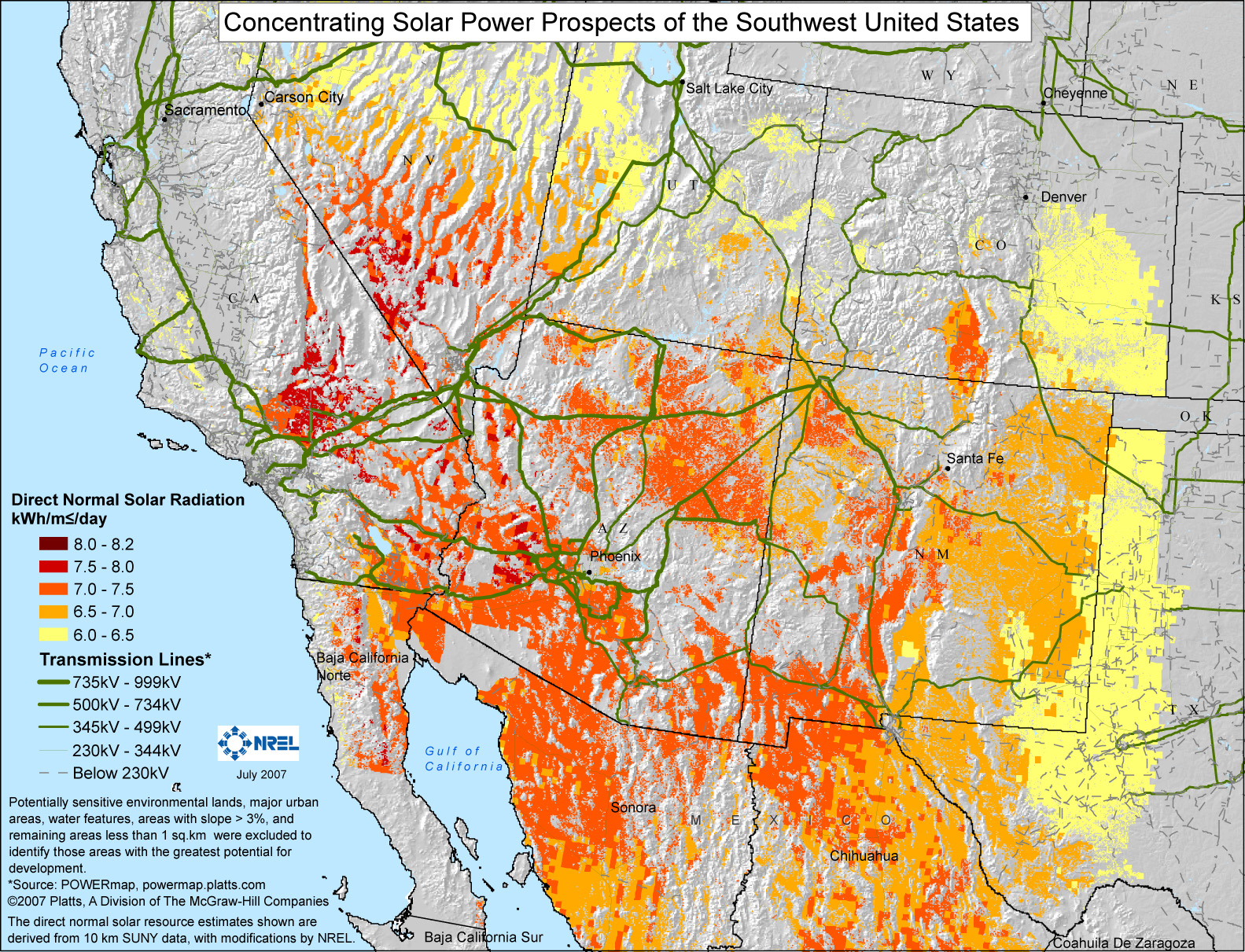
Insolation on developable areas of the SW United States

Solar power in Arizona has the potential to, according to then-Governor Janet Napolitano, make Arizona "the Persian Gulf of solar energy". In 2012, Arizona had 1,106 MW of photovoltaic (PV) solar power systems, and 6 MW of concentrated solar power (CSP), bringing the total to over 1,112 megawatts (MW) of solar power. As an example, the Solana Generating Station, a 280 MW parabolic trough solar plant, when commissioned in 2013, was the largest parabolic trough plant in the world and the first U.S. solar plant with molten salt thermal energy storage.

A Renewable Portfolio Standard set by the Arizona Corporation Commission requires 15% renewable energy by 2025 among regulated utilities, 4.5% of which must come from distributed renewable energy sources.

== History ==
The first commercial solar power system in the state was a 95 kilowatt (kW) single-axis tracking photovoltaic plant in Flagstaff, Arizona, opened in October 1997 and operated by Arizona Public Service (APS). In 1999, the city of Scottsdale covered an 8,500 square feet (790 m^{2}) parking lot with photovoltaic panels, to both provide shaded parking, and generate 93 kW of solar power. In 2001 APS and Embry-Riddle Aeronautical University constructed a 190 kW single-axis tracking photovoltaic power plant.

In 2001, the Springerville Generating Station Solar System was built by Tucson Electric Power, one of the first large scale photovoltaic power stations. Originally 4.6 MW, it has been expanded to 6.4 MW. In 2002, Love Field Airport, in Prescott, Arizona, began construction of a 5 megawatt (MW) photovoltaic power plant. By July 2006, it had a peak capacity of 2.879 MW_{AC}.

The two operating concentrated solar power plants are the 1 MW Saguaro Solar Power Plant completed in 2005, the first commercial CSP plant of the 3rd millennium, and a 5 MW solar trough system at the University of Arizona Solar Tech Parks Arizona project which was completed in 2011. The 280 MW Solano Generating Station is under construction. The 1.5 MW Maricopa Solar Power Plant completed in 2010, using Stirling dish technology, was decommissioned in September 2011 and sold at auction on April 17, 2012 to CondiSys Solar Technology of China, for $250,000.

In 2008, Governor Janet Napolitano said that Arizona had the potential to become "the Persian Gulf of solar energy". In 2012, the NREL determined that Arizona has the potential to install 5,147 GW of photovoltaic power plants, and/or up to 3,528 GW of concentrated solar power plants (CSP), sufficient to generate more than three times total US consumption in 2012. According to a study by the Solar Energy Industries Association (SEIA) and GTM Research, Arizona installed over 55 megawatts of solar power in 2010, doubling its 2009 increase of 21 MW, ranking it behind California (259 MW), New Jersey (137 MW), Florida (110 MW), and Nevada (61 MW). By the end of 2011, Arizona had installed 383 MW of photovoltaics, in third place, behind New Jersey, and California.

In 2012 the first 100 MW of the Agua Caliente Solar Project was connected to the grid, making it the largest photovoltaic power plant in North America, and third largest in the world, being slightly larger than the 97 MW Sarnia Photovoltaic Power Plant. By July, over 200 MW had been completed, making it the largest photovoltaic power plant in the world. By September 2012, 250 MW (AC) had been completed.

In January 2013, 150 MW of the 700 MW Mesquite Solar project photovoltaic power plant was completed. As of January 30, 2013, 19 projects, with a total nameplate capacity of 13.45 gigawatts (GW) were seeking permission to build on federally owned BLM land in Arizona, and one, the 300 MW Sonoran Solar Project was approved, but the project fell through and not developed.

The Solana Generating Station completed testing in October 2013. The 280 MW parabolic trough solar plant is the largest plant of its type in the world. Solana includes six hours of power storage by molten salt. The plant will provide 5% of the power for Arizona Public Service, the state's largest utility.

Historically, Arizona has had one of the most successful solar incentive programs in the United States. However, as of February, 2013, the Arizona Corporation Commission has completely eliminated commercial incentives and has severely reduced the amount of residential incentives available. Still, some of the country's largest solar providers continue to do business in the state, including the largest solar contractor in the US, First Solar.

== Currently operating (Note: As of December 31, 2025) ==
=== Central region ===
Solar Facilities in Arizona (Central Region)
| # | Plant Name | Utility Name | County | Capacity (MW) | Operating Year |
|---|---|---|---|---|---|
| 1 | AZ State University - Tempe Campus Solar | Arizona State University FDM | Maricopa | 0.1 | 2003 |
| 2 | AZ State University - Tempe Campus Solar | Arizona State University FDM | Maricopa | 0.6 | 2008 |
| 3 | AZ State University - Tempe Campus Solar | Arizona State University FDM | Maricopa | 1.0 | 2009 |
| 4 | AZ State University - Tempe Campus Solar | Arizona State University FDM | Maricopa | 0.6 | 2013 |
| 5 | AZ State University - Tempe Campus Solar | Arizona State University FDM | Maricopa | 0.1 | 2018 |
| 6 | AZ State University - Tempe Campus Solar | Arizona State University FDM | Maricopa | 0.1 | 2025 |
| 7 | Agave | Arizona Public Service Co | Maricopa | 150.0 | 2023 |
| 8 | Agua Fria | Salt River Project | Maricopa | 0.2 | 2001 |
| 9 | Amazon Goodyear | Westbound Solar 3, LLC | Maricopa | 2.4 | 2023 |
| 10 | Arlington Valley Solar Energy II | Arlington Valley Solar Energy II LLC | Maricopa | 129.0 | 2013 |
| 11 | Badger 1 | Desert Sky Solar LLC | Maricopa | 14.8 | 2013 |
| 12 | Banner Solar Ironwood | Banner Solar Ironwood LLC | Pinal | 1.4 | 2021 |
| 13 | Bonnybrooke PV | Salt River Project | Pinal | 50.0 | 2016 |
| 14 | Box Canyon (AZ) | BOCA bn, LLC | Pinal | 300.0 | 2025 |
| 15 | Brittlebush Solar | Randolph Solar Park LLC | Pinal | 200.0 | 2024 |
| 16 | Buckeye Union HS District 201 | Luminace Solar Arizona, LLC | Maricopa | 3.3 | 2011 |
| 17 | Central Line Solar, LLC | AES Distributed Energy | Pinal | 100.0 | 2022 |
| 18 | Cotton Center Solar Hybrid | Arizona Public Service Co | Maricopa | 17.0 | 2011 |
| 19 | Desert Star Hybrid | Arizona Public Service Co | Maricopa | 10.0 | 2015 |
| 20 | East Line Solar | AES Distributed Energy | Pinal | 100.0 | 2020 |
| 21 | Eleven Mile Solar Center | Eleven Mile Solar Center, LLC | Pinal | 300.0 | 2024 |
| 22 | Estrella Mountain PV | Tesla Inc. | Maricopa | 1.8 | 2019 |
| 23 | Gila Bend Hybrid | Arizona Public Service Co | Maricopa | 36.0 | 2014 |
| 24 | Gilbert Solar Facility I, LLC | Gilbert Solar Facility I, LLC | Maricopa | 2.0 | 2011 |
| 25 | Harquahala 2 | Copia Power | Maricopa | 300.0 | 2025 |
| 26 | Harquahala Sun Solar Project | Copia Power | Maricopa | 150.0 | 2025 |
| 27 | Intel - Ocotillo Campus Solar | Tesla Inc. | Maricopa | 2.8 | 2017 |
| 28 | Intel - Ocotillo Campus Solar | Tesla Inc. | Maricopa | 1.4 | 2018 |
| 29 | Jewish Community Center PV | AES Distributed Energy | Maricopa | 1.1 | 2012 |
| 30 | Lake Pleasant WTP | MN8 Energy LLC | Maricopa | 6.5 | 2012 |
| 31 | Luke Solar | Arizona Public Service Co | Maricopa | 11.2 | 2015 |
| 32 | Macys Goodyear | Macys Corporate Services, Inc | Maricopa | 3.1 | 2010 |
| 33 | Mesa Carport PV | Apple, Inc | Maricopa | 4.6 | 2020 |
| 34 | Mesquite Solar 1 | RWE Clean Energy | Maricopa | 26.0 | 2011 |
| 35 | Mesquite Solar 1 | RWE Clean Energy | Maricopa | 144.0 | 2012 |
| 36 | Mesquite Solar 2, LLC | RWE Clean Energy | Maricopa | 100.0 | 2016 |
| 37 | Mesquite Solar 3, LLC | RWE Clean Energy | Maricopa | 150.0 | 2016 |
| 38 | Mesquite Solar 4, LLC | RWE Clean Energy | Maricopa | 52.5 | 2024 |
| 39 | Mesquite Solar 5, LLC | RWE Clean Energy | Maricopa | 60.0 | 2023 |
| 40 | Paloma Solar Hybrid | Arizona Public Service Co | Maricopa | 17.0 | 2011 |
| 41 | Paradise Valley H.S. PV | AES Distributed Energy | Maricopa | 1.3 | 2013 |
| 42 | Phoenix Airport East Economy Lot | SunStrong Management, LLC | Maricopa | 1.1 | 2012 |
| 43 | Phoenix Airport Rental Car Center | SunStrong Management, LLC | Maricopa | 1.6 | 2012 |
| 44 | Pinal Central Energy Center Hybrid | Pinal Central Energy Center, LLC | Pinal | 20.0 | 2018 |
| 45 | Poseidon Solar, LLC | Axium Arizona Renewables, LLC | GILA | 20.0 | 2011 |
| 46 | Queen Creek Solar Farm | Siete Solar LLC | Maricopa | 19.0 | 2012 |
| 47 | RE Gillespie 1 LLC | MN8 Energy LLC | Maricopa | 15.0 | 2013 |
| 48 | Red Rock | Arizona Public Service Co | Maricopa | 43.9 | 2017 |
| 49 | Saddle Mountain Solar I | SunE AZ2, LLC | Maricopa | 15.0 | 2012 |
| 50 | Saint Solar | Saint Solar LLC | Pinal | 100.0 | 2021 |
| 51 | Sandstone Solar | AES Distributed Energy | Pinal | 45.0 | 2015 |
| 52 | Solana Generating Station | Arizona Solar One LLC | Maricopa | 280.0 | 2013 |
| 53 | Sonoran Solar Energy | Sonoran Solar Energy, LLC | Maricopa | 490.0 | 2023 |
| 54 | Storey Solar and Storage | Storey Energy Center, LLC | Pinal | 122.0 | 2023 |
| 55 | Sun Streams 2 | Sun Streams 2, LLC | Maricopa | 150.0 | 2021 |
| 56 | Sun Streams 3 | Sun Streams PVS, LLC | Maricopa | 215.0 | 2024 |
| 57 | Sun Streams 4 | Sun Streams Expansion, LLC | Maricopa | 300.0 | 2025 |
| 58 | Sun Streams, LLC | EDP Renewables North America LLC | Maricopa | 160.0 | 2020 |
| 59 | T0588 Phoenix - AZ | SoCore Energy LLC | Maricopa | 1.2 | 2017 |
| 60 | TJX Phoenix | SoCore Energy LLC | Maricopa | 2.9 | 2018 |
| 61 | Union HS at Casa Grande | Luminace Solar Holding, LLC | Pinal | 1.6 | 2012 |
| 62 | Vista Grande HS at Casa Grande | Luminace Solar Holding, LLC | Pinal | 1.4 | 2012 |
| 63 | West Line Solar, LLC | Foster Clean Power A LLC | Pinal | 100.0 | 2022 |

=== Northern region ===
Solar Facilities in Arizona (Northern Region)
| # | Plant Name | Utility Name | County | Capacity (MW) | Operating Year |
|---|---|---|---|---|---|
| 1 | Chino Valley Solar | Arizona Public Service Co | Yavapai | 19.0 | 2012 |
| 2 | Kayenta Solar Project | NGI-Kayenta Solar Lessor I, LLC | Navajo | 27.3 | 2017 |
| 3 | Kayenta Solar Project | NGI-Kayenta Solar Lessor I, LLC | Navajo | 28.0 | 2019 |
| 4 | Prescott Airport | Arizona Public Service Co | Yavapai | 3.0 | 2002 |
| 5 | Prescott Solar Plant | SunE AZ1, LLC | Yavapai | 10.8 | 2011 |
| 6 | RE Bagdad Solar I LLC | Deriva Energy | Yavapai | 14.9 | 2011 |
| 7 | Springerville | Tucson Electric Power Co | Apache | 3.7 | 2001 |
| 8 | Springerville | Tucson Electric Power Co | Apache | 1.4 | 2010 |
| 9 | Springerville | Tucson Electric Power Co | Apache | 8.3 | 2014 |

=== Southern region ===
Solar Facilities in Arizona (Southern Region)
| # | Plant Name | Utility Name | County | Capacity (MW) | Operating Year |
|---|---|---|---|---|---|
| 1 | Actus Lend Lease DMAFB | Tesla Inc. | Pima | 3.0 | 2009 |
| 2 | Agua Caliente Solar Project | Agua Caliente Solar | Yuma | 226.7 | 2012 |
| 3 | Agua Caliente Solar Project | Agua Caliente Solar | Yuma | 121.0 | 2014 |
| 4 | Amazon TUS2 | SkyHigh 2 Solar | Pima | 2.6 | 2022 |
| 5 | Amphitheater High School Solar | Luminace Solar Arizona 2, LLC | Pima | 1.0 | 2016 |
| 6 | Apache Solar I | Arizona Electric Pwr Coop Inc | Cochise | 20.0 | 2017 |
| 7 | Arizona Western College PV | AES Distributed Energy | Yuma | 3.7 | 2011 |
| 8 | Arizona Western College PV | AES Distributed Energy | Yuma | 1.0 | 2015 |
| 9 | Avalon Solar | Arevon Energy, Inc. | Pima | 29.0 | 2014 |
| 10 | Avalon Solar II | Avalon Solar Partners II, LLC | Pima | 16.0 | 2016 |
| 11 | Avra Valley Solar | Solar Avra Valley LLC | Pima | 25.0 | 2013 |
| 12 | Broadway 2 - Tucson Phase II | MN8 Energy LLC | Pima | 3.0 | 2013 |
| 13 | Broadway 3 - Tucson Phase I | MN8 Energy LLC | Pima | 1.0 | 2011 |
| 14 | Canyon Del Oro High School Solar | Luminace Solar Arizona 2, LLC | Pima | 1.6 | 2016 |
| 15 | Cogenra - TEP | Terraform Arcadia | Pima | 1.0 | 2014 |
| 16 | Davis Monthan AFB (AZ) West Airfield | MN8 Energy LLC | Pima | 12.6 | 2014 |
| 17 | FRB Solar Farm | FRB Solar LLC | Pima | 1.9 | 2011 |
| 18 | Foothills Solar Plant Hybrid | Arizona Public Service Co | Yuma | 38.0 | 2013 |
| 19 | Fort Huachuca Solar PV Project | Tucson Electric Power Co | Cochise | 13.6 | 2014 |
| 20 | Fort Huachuca Solar PV Project | Tucson Electric Power Co | Cochise | 4.1 | 2017 |
| 21 | Gato Montes Solar, LLC | Deriva Energy | Pima | 5.0 | 2012 |
| 22 | Hyder II Hybrid | Arizona Public Service Co | Yuma | 14.0 | 2013 |
| 23 | Hyder Solar Hybrid | Arizona Public Service Co | Yuma | 17.0 | 2011 |
| 24 | Hyder Solar Hybrid | Arizona Public Service Co | Yuma | 15.0 | 2012 |
| 25 | Iron Horse Battery Storage Hybrid | RWE Clean Energy | Pima | 2.0 | 2017 |
| 26 | McFarland A Solar and Storage | AES Clean Energy | Yuma | 200.0 | 2023 |
| 27 | McFarland B Solar and Storage | AES Clean Energy | Yuma | 300.0 | 2024 |
| 28 | Picture Rocks Solar, LLC | MN8 Energy LLC | Pima | 20.0 | 2012 |
| 29 | Pima Community College | Tesla Inc. | Pima | 1.1 | 2019 |
| 30 | Pima Community College - East Campus | Tesla Inc. | Pima | 1.3 | 2017 |
| 31 | Pima Community College NW | Onyx Asset Services Group | Pima | 1.3 | 2019 |
| 32 | Prairie Fire | Tucson Electric Power Co | Pima | 4.5 | 2012 |
| 33 | RE Ajo 1 LLC | Deriva Energy | Pima | 4.5 | 2011 |
| 34 | Raptor Ridge | Tucson Electric Power Co | Pima | 12.5 | 2022 |
| 35 | Red Horse 2 | Red Horse 2 | Cochise | 51.0 | 2015 |
| 36 | Red Horse III | Red Horse III | Cochise | 30.0 | 2016 |
| 37 | Rio Rico Solar | UNS Electric, Inc | Santa Cruz | 6.0 | 2014 |
| 38 | Roadrunner Solar and BESS | Clenera LLC | Cochise | 235.0 | 2025 |
| 39 | Roger Road WWTP | SunE M5C Holdings LLC | Pima | 1.1 | 2010 |
| 40 | SR McNeal | SR McNeal, LLC | Cochise | 20.0 | 2023 |
| 41 | Serrano | Serrano Solar, LLC | Pima | 170.0 | 2025 |
| 42 | Sulphur Springs | MN8 Energy LLC | Cochise | 20.0 | 2016 |
| 43 | TJX Tucson | SoCore Energy LLC | Pima | 1.0 | 2018 |
| 44 | Tech Park Solar | RWE Clean Energy | Pima | 5.0 | 2012 |
| 45 | Tucson - CAVSARP | Onyx Asset Services Group | Pima | 7.2 | 2025 |
| 46 | UASTP I | Tucson Electric Power Co | Pima | 1.2 | 2010 |
| 47 | Valencia Solar | RWE Clean Energy | Pima | 10.0 | 2013 |
| 48 | White Wing Solar | Leeward Asset Management, LLC | Yuma | 179.0 | 2024 |
| 49 | Wilmot Energy Center LLC | Wilmot Energy Center LLC | Pima | 130.0 | 2021 |
| 50 | Yuma Solar + Storage | Invenergy Services LLC | Yuma | 70.0 | 2025 |

=== Western region ===
Solar Facilities in Arizona (Western Region)
| # | Plant Name | Utility Name | County | Capacity (MW) | Operating Year |
|---|---|---|---|---|---|
| 1 | Agua Caliente Solar Project | Agua Caliente Solar | Yuma | 226.7 | 2012 |
| 2 | Agua Caliente Solar Project | Agua Caliente Solar | Yuma | 121.0 | 2014 |
| 3 | Arizona Western College PV | AES Distributed Energy | Yuma | 3.7 | 2011 |
| 4 | Arizona Western College PV | AES Distributed Energy | Yuma | 1.0 | 2015 |
| 5 | Black Mountain Solar LLC | Deriva Energy | Mohave | 9.0 | 2012 |
| 6 | Foothills Solar Plant Hybrid | Arizona Public Service Co | Yuma | 38.0 | 2013 |
| 7 | Gray Hawk Solar | Gray Hawk Solar, LLC | Mohave | 55.0 | 2018 |
| 8 | Hyder II Hybrid | Arizona Public Service Co | Yuma | 14.0 | 2013 |
| 9 | Hyder Solar Hybrid | Arizona Public Service Co | Yuma | 17.0 | 2011 |
| 10 | Hyder Solar Hybrid | Arizona Public Service Co | Yuma | 15.0 | 2012 |
| 11 | Jacobson 5 MW Solar | UNS Electric, Inc | Mohave | 4.4 | 2017 |
| 12 | Kingman 1 | Kingman Energy Corp | Mohave | 0.5 | 2011 |
| 13 | La Senita | UNS Electric, Inc | Mohave | 1.0 | 2011 |
| 14 | McFarland A Solar and Storage | AES Clean Energy | Yuma | 200.0 | 2023 |
| 15 | McFarland B Solar and Storage | AES Clean Energy | Yuma | 300.0 | 2024 |
| 16 | Mohave Electric Cooperative at Joy Lane | Mohave Electric Cooperative, Inc. | Mohave | 10.9 | 2016 |
| 17 | Mohave Electric at Fort Mohave | Mohave Electric Cooperative, Inc. | Mohave | 4.4 | 2015 |
| 18 | Mohave Energy - Hybrid | Mohave Energy | Mohave | 17.6 | 2023 |
| 19 | OE_AZ1 | Onward Energy | La Paz | 32.5 | 2020 |
| 20 | White Wing Solar | Leeward Asset Management, LLC | Yuma | 179.0 | 2024 |
| 21 | Yuma Solar + Storage | Invenergy Services LLC | Yuma | 70.0 | 2025 |

== Community solar farms ==
Arizona has two community solar farms. Tucson Electric Power has a 1.6 MW community solar farm southeast of Tucson. Consumers can purchase 150 kWh for about $3/month. The 227 kW Trico Sun Farm in Marana allows Trico customers to purchase solar panels in one quarter increments for $920, and receive a credit of the output, about 36 kWh, each month for 20 years, worth about $5. Customers can purchase up to their average usage for the last 12 months, up to 10,000 watts.

== Statistics ==
=== Capacity ===
2017 electricity generation in Arizona by source

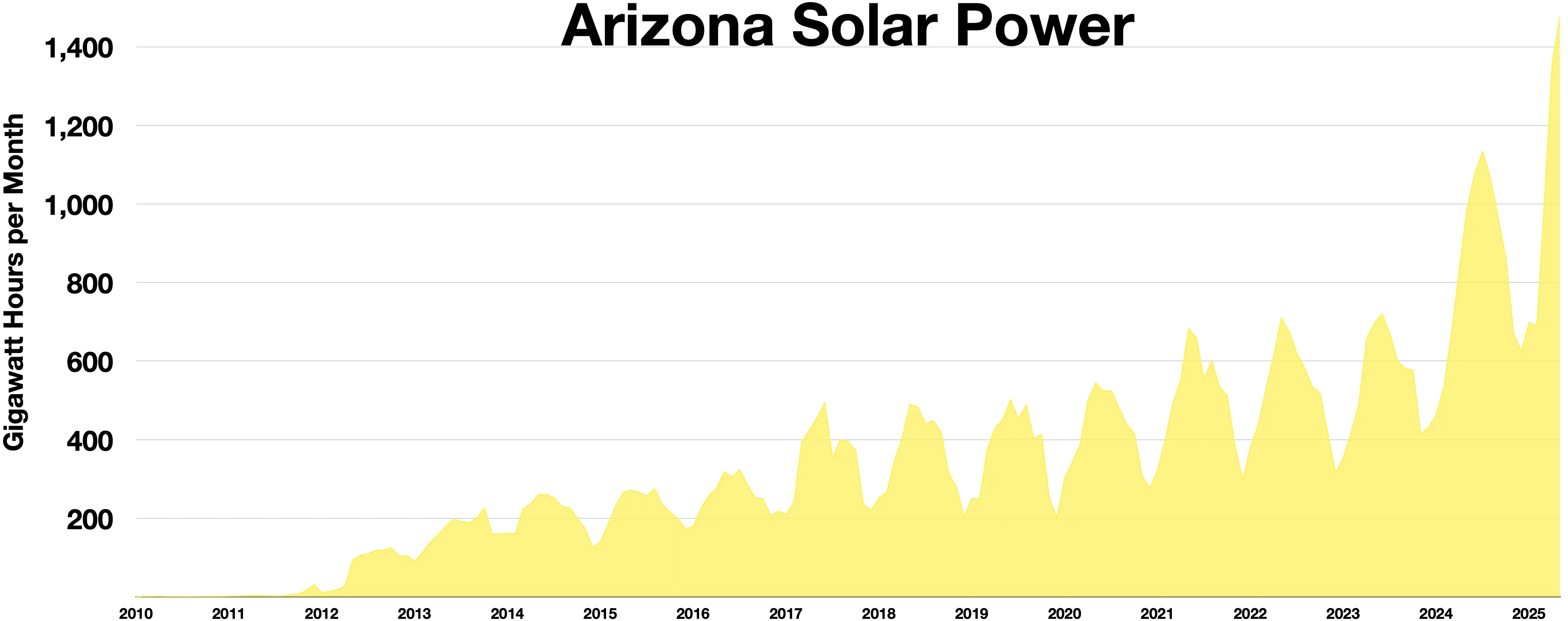
Arizona solar power

Arizona solar capacity (MWp)
| Year | Photovoltaics | | | CSP | | |
| Year | Capacity | Installed | % change | Capacity | Installed | % change |
|---|---|---|---|---|---|---|
| 2007 | 18.9 | 2.8 | 17 | 1 | 0 | |
| 2008 | 25.3 | 6.2 | 34 | 1 | 0 | |
| 2009 | 46.2 | 21.1 | 83 | 1 | 0 | |
| 2010 | 110.0 | 63.6 | 138 | 2.5 | 1.5 | 150 |
| 2011 | 397.6 | 287.8 | 261 | 6 | 3.5 | 140 |
| 2012 | 1,106.4 | 708.8 | 178 | 6 | 0 | 0 |
| 2013 | 1,563.1 | 423.7 | 37 | 283.7 | 277.3 | |
| 2014 | 2,069 | 287.8 | 32 | 283.7 | 0 | 0 |
| 2015 | 2,303 | 234 | 11 | 283.7 | 0 | 0 |
| 2016 | 2,943 | 640 | 27.7 | 283.7 | 0 | 0 |
| 2017 | 3,423 | 480 | 16.3 | 283.7 | 0 | 0 |
| 2018 | 3,863 | 440 | 12.9 | 283.7 | 0 | 0 |
| 2019 | 4,645.9 | 782.9 | 20.2 | 283.7 | 0 | 0 |
| 2020 | 5,175.7 | 529.8 | 11.4 | 283.7 | 0 | 0 |
| 2021 | 5,643.6 | 467.9 | 9 | | | |
| 2022 | 6,330 | 686.4 | 12 | | | |
| 2023 | 7,675 | 1,345 | 21 | | | |

=== Generation ===
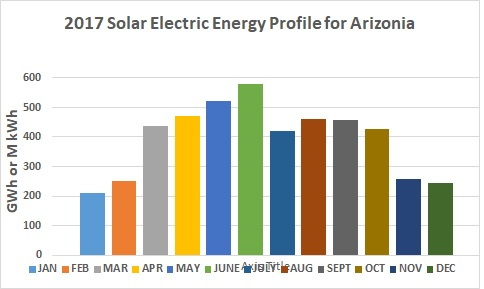
2017 AZ solar energy generation profile

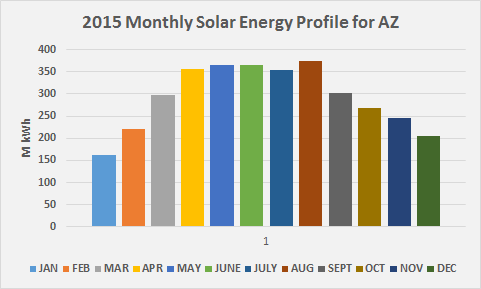
2015 monthly solar profile for AZ

Arizona utility-scale solar electric generation
| Year | Generation (GWh) | Generation (% of AZ total) | Generation (% of US solar) |
|---|---|---|---|
| 2010 | 16 | <0.1% | 1.3% |
| 2011 | 83 | 0.1% | 4.6% |
| 2012 | 955 | 0.9% | 22.1% |
| 2013 | 2,111 | 1.9% | 23.4% |
| 2014 | 3,142 | 2.8% | 16.9% |
| 2015 | 3,457 | 3.1% | 13.9% |
| 2016 | 3,766 | 3.5% | 10.4% |
| 2017 | 4,942 | 4.7% | 9.3% |
| 2018* | 5,171 | 4.6% | 7.8% |
| 2019** | | 6.6% | |

(*) Preliminary data from Electric Power Monthly. (**) Data from Solar Energy Industries Association.

Beginning with the 2014 data year, the Energy Information Administration has estimated distributed solar photovoltaic generation and distributed solar photovoltaic capacity. These non-utility scale estimates project that, Arizona generated the following additional solar energy.

Estimated distributed solar electric generation in Arizona
| Year | Summer capacity (MW) | Electric energy (GWh or M kWh) |
|---|---|---|
| 2014 | 511.7 | 916 |
| 2015 | 641.6 | 1,370 |
| 2016 | 871.8 | 1,655 |
| 2017 | 1068.6 | 1,893 |
| 2018 | 1262.9 | 2,307 |

== Large solar farms ==
| MW | Name | County | Location | Technology | Notes |
|---|---|---|---|---|---|
| 400 | Mesquite Solar project | Maricopa County | west of Arlington; 33°20′00″N 112°55′00″W | photovoltaic | 150 MW phase 1 online Jan 2013 100 MW phase 2 online Dec 2016; 150 MW phase 3 online Dec 2016; Total of 700 MW proposed. |
| 290 | Agua Caliente Solar Project | Yuma County | Palomas Plain; 32°58′45″N 113°29′45″W | photovoltaic | 290 MW AC online April 2014 |
| 280 | Solana Generating Station | Maricopa County | southwest of Phoenix; 32°55′00″N 112°58′00″W | solar thermal with 6 hours storage | Two 140 MW generators online October 2013. |
| 125 | Arlington Valley Solar Energy II | Maricopa County | west of Arlington; 33°18′18″N 112°50′02″W | photovoltaic | 125 MW AC online May 2013 |
| 100 | East Line Solar | Pinal County | Coolidge | photovoltaic | 100 MW AC online December 2020 |
| 100 | Central Line Solar | Pinal County | Between Coolidge and Eloy | photovoltaic | 100 MW AC online April 28, 2022 |
| 100 | Saint Solar | Pinal County | Casa Grande | photovoltaic | 100 MW AC online December 2020 |
| 100 | West Line Solar | Pinal County | Eloy; 32°45′49″N 111°36′0″W | photovoltaic | 100 MW AC online February 7 2023 |
| 45 | Sandstone | Pinal County | Florence; 33°03′40″N 111°45′22″W | photovoltaic | 45 MW AC online February 2016 |

=== Proposed and under construction ===
| MW | Name | County | Location | Technology | Notes |
|---|---|---|---|---|---|
| 600 | Jove Solar Project | La Paz County | south of Salome | photovoltaic | |
| 400 | CO Bar Solar | Coconino County | northwest of Flagstaff | photovoltaic | |
| 340 | Hualapai Valley Solar Project | Mohave County | Hualapai Valley; 35°36′N 114°0′W | parabolic trough | |
| 325 | Hyder Valley Solar Energy Project | Yuma County | Palomas Plain; 33°05′N 113°13′W | parabolic trough | 200 MW phase 1, 125 MW phase 2 |
| 300 | Sonoran Solar Project | Maricopa County | south of Buckeye; 33°14′N 112°34′W | photovoltaic | Approved late 2011 |
| 300 | Pioneer Clean Energy | Yuma | | photovoltaic | 1.2 GWh battery |
| 215 | Crossroads Solar Energy Project | Maricopa County | west of Gila Bend; 32°58′N 112°53′W | solar power tower with 10 hours of heat storage; 65 MW of PV | |
| 200 | Brittlebush Solar, (previously called Randolph Solar) | Pinal County | Adjacent to Coolidge Generating Station; 32°55′03″N 111°30′12″W | photovoltaic | 200 MW |
| 100 | Quartzsite Solar Energy Project | La Paz County | north of Quartzsite; 33°48′N 114°12′W | power tower | |
| 60 | Babbit Ranch Solar and Storage Project | Coconino County | northwest of Flagstaff | photovoltaic | |
| 205 | Catclaw | Maricopa County | Buckeye | photovoltaic | 250 MW / 1 GWh battery |
| 450 | Sterling | Mohave | between Topock and Kingman | 500 MW DC photovoltaic | 360 MW / 1,400 MWh battery |

== Net metering ==
As of June 2021, Arizona was served primarily by Arizona Public Service company, Tucson Electric Power and UniSource Energy Services.

In 2008, Arizona had one of the most consumer-friendly net metering laws in the country. Excess generation is rolled over month to month, and any surplus was returned annually to the consumer at the avoided cost rate. IREC best practices, based on experience, recommends perpetual roll over of kWh credits. Arizona had 642 MW of rooftop solar in 2015. Historically, the states' utilities have led repeated, failed efforts to eliminate net metering. After a year of wrangling with the solar industry, the Arizona Corporation Commission (ACC) decided in December 2016 to lower net-metering reimbursement rates significantly, leading to a temporary lull in rooftop solar installations because the lower rates made solar installations less economical for most residential and commercial installations. In 2017, ACC approved stopping net metering entirely.

In September 2018, Tucson Electric introduced a new solar export program for homeowners.

== Renewable Portfolio Standard ==
The Arizona Renewable Portfolio Standard calls for 15% renewable energy by 2025, and 4.5% (30% of that) from distributed generation from renewable sources. Renewable Energy Certificates (RECs), may be purchased to meet the requirement.

== Arizona Solar Business Directory ==
The Arizona Solar Business Directory contains almost 100 solar installation companies that do business in Arizona and is maintained by the Arizona Solar Power Society. The business directory allows consumers and commercial customers to contact a number of different companies to get the best deal and best performing products in the solar industry.

== Arizona Solar Watchdog Program ==
The purpose of the Arizona Solar Watchdog Program is to teach consumers how to check a solar installation contractor's license, credentials and work history. Every contractor in Arizona needs to be registered with the Arizona Registrar of Contractors (ROC). Each contractor is issued a Registrar of Contractors' license number, which can be looked up using the step-by-step process outlined under the Arizona Solar Watchdog Program.

== Gallery ==
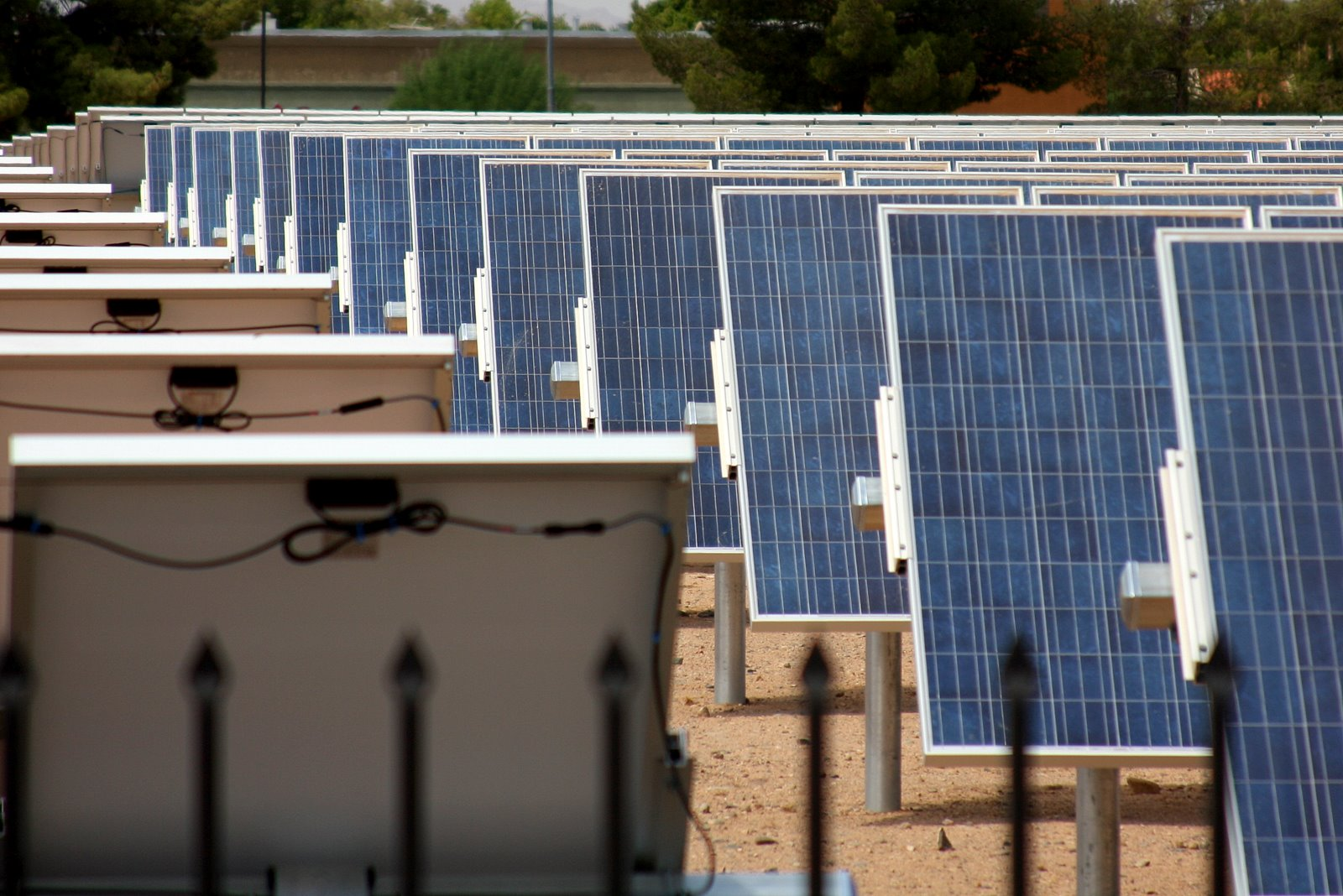
Arizona State University solar array

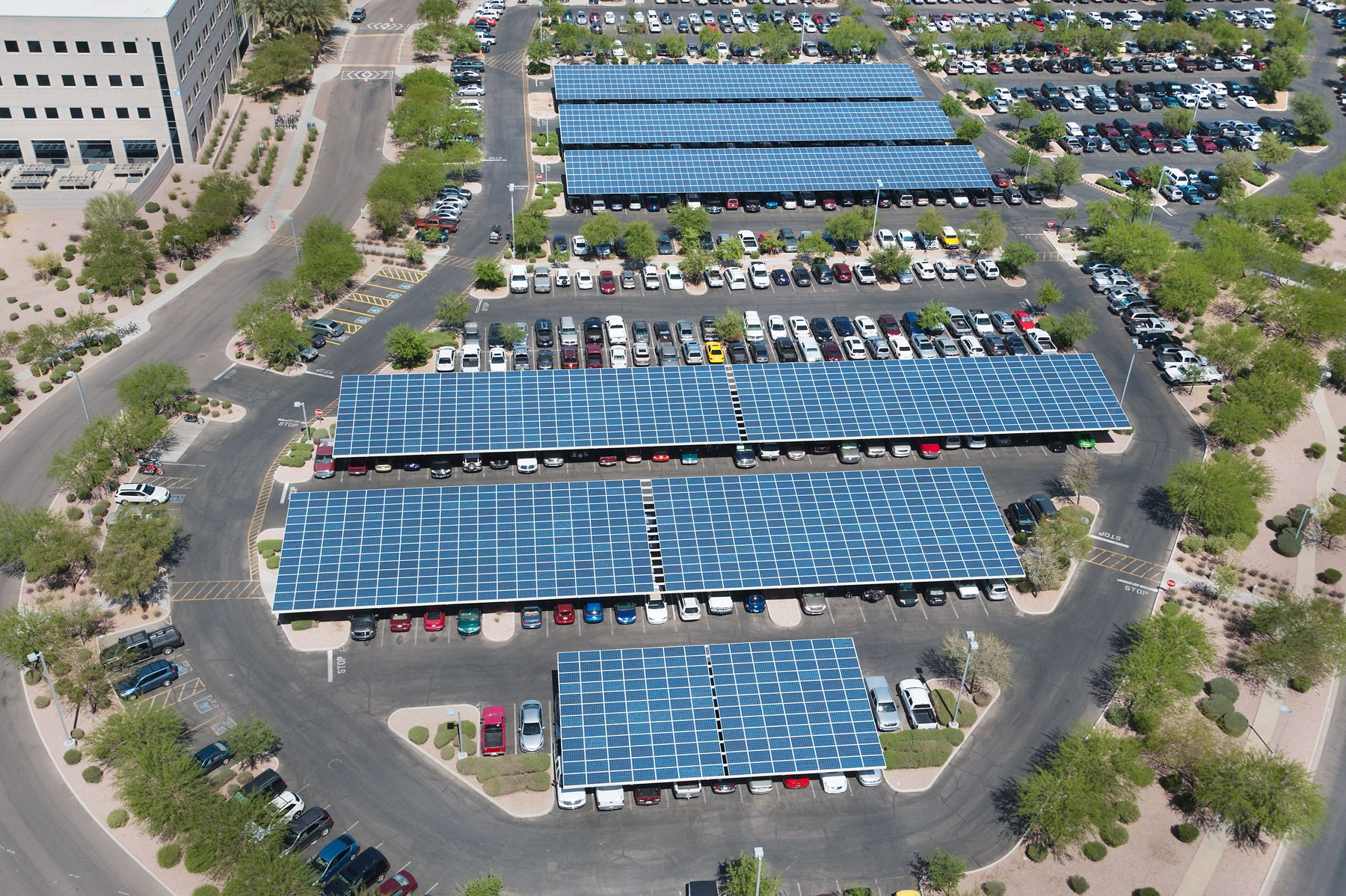
Solar cells above a parking lot, Ocotillo

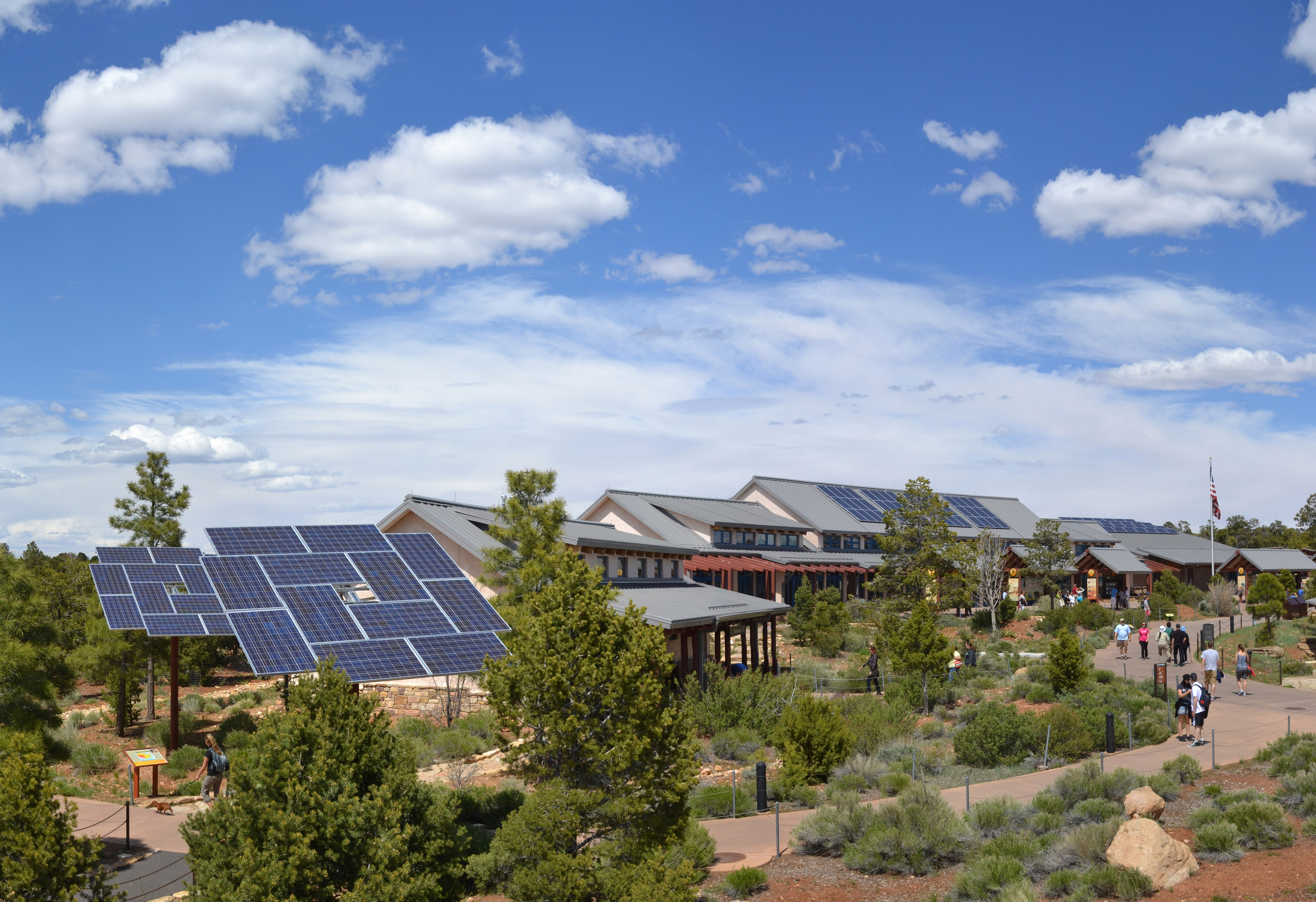
Solar power system, Grand Canyon National Park Visitor Center

== See also ==
- Wind power in Arizona
- Solar power in the United States
- Renewable energy in the United States
