= Parietal eye =

Part of the epithalamus

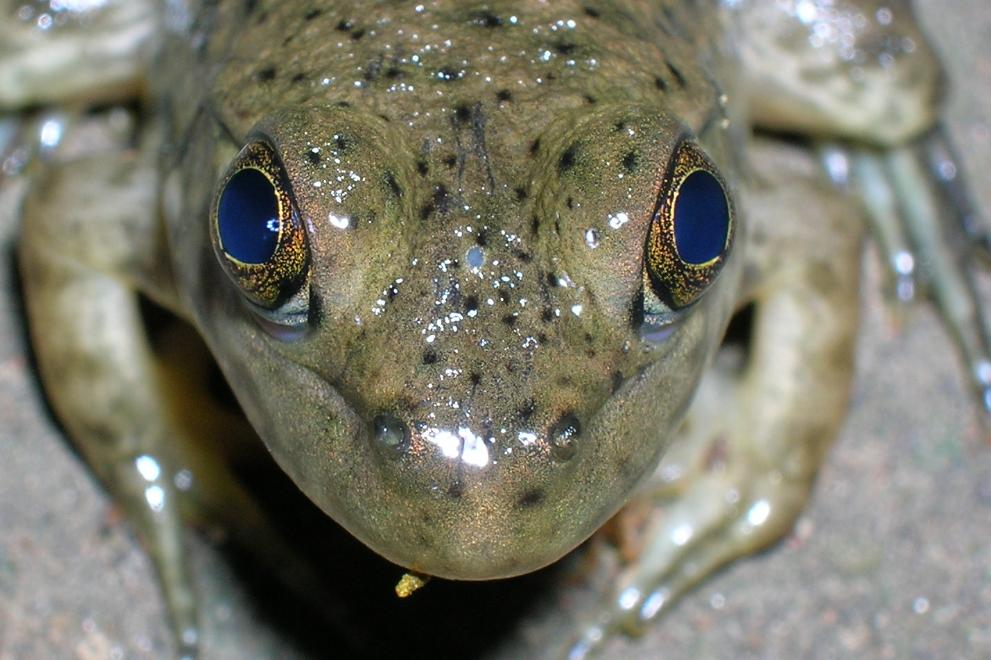
The parietal eye (very small grey oval between the regular eyes) of a juvenile bullfrog (Lithobates catesbeianus)

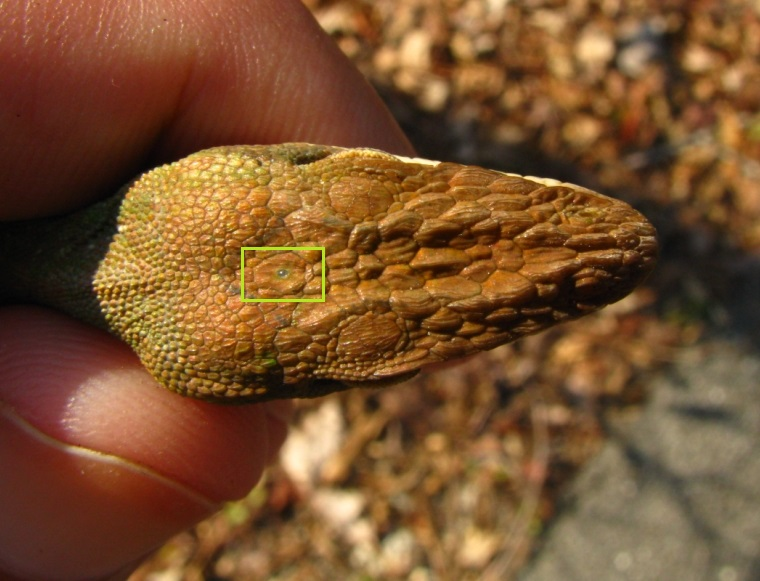
Adult green anole (Anolis carolinensis) clearly showing the parietal eye (small grey/clear oval) at the top of its head

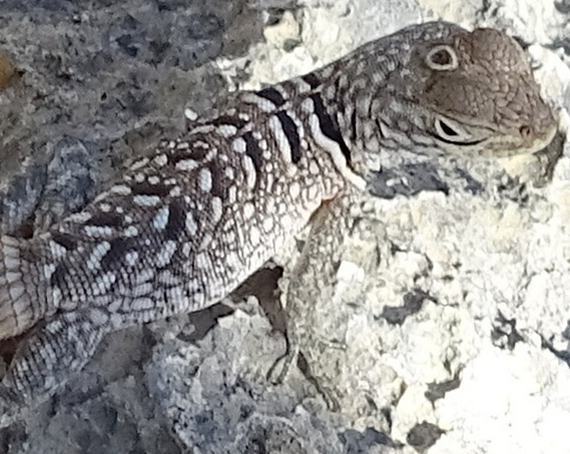
Parietal eye of the Merrem's Madagascar swift (Oplurus cyclurus) is surrounded by a black-and-white spot on the skin, giving it the "three-eyed" appearance.

A parietal eye (third eye, pineal eye) is a part of the epithalamus in some vertebrates. The eye is at the top of the head, is photoreceptive, and is associated with the pineal gland, which regulates circadian rhythmicity and hormone production for thermoregulation. The hole that contains the eye is known as the pineal foramen or parietal foramen, because it is often enclosed by the parietal bones.

The parietal eye was discovered by Franz Leydig, in 1872, from work with lizards.

== Discovery ==
In 1872, Franz Leydig, a professor of zoology at the University of Tübingen, dissected four species of European lizards—the slow worm (Anguis fragilis) and three species of Lacerta. He found cup-like protrusions under the middles of their brains. He believed the protrusions to be glandular and called them frontal organs (German Stirnorgan).

In 1886, Walter Baldwin Spencer, an anatomist at the University of Oxford, reported the results of his dissection of 29 species of lizards; he noted the presence of the same structure that Leydig had described. Spencer called it the pineal eye or parietal eye and noticed that it was associated with the parietal foramen and the pineal stalk, which attaches the pineal gland to the rest of the brain. In 1918, Nils Holmgren, a Swedish zoologist, found the pineal eye in frogs and dogfish. He noted that the structure contained sensory cells that looked like the cone cells of the retina, and hypothesised that the pineal eye could be a primitive light-sensing organ (photoreceptor). The organ has become popularly known as the "third eye".

== Presence in various animals ==
The parietal eye is found in the tuatara, most lizards, frogs, salamanders, certain bony fish, sharks, and lampreys. It is absent in mammals but was present in other extinct members of Synapsida including Therapsida. The pineal foramen became completely closed over in mammal line cynodonts belonging to Probainognathia, indicating the parietal eye lost its functionality in the ancestors of mammals by the Middle Triassic. Ancestrally and widely present in early reptiles (Sauropsida), the parietal eye was lost in archosaurs including crocodilians and birds, though it is present in earlier archosauromorphs. It was also lost in the ancestors of turtles, which may be grouped with archosaurs in Archelosauria. Among lepidosaurs, snakes have also lost the parietal eye.

== Anatomy ==
In the earliest stem-vertebrates from the Cambrian, such as the myllokunmingiids and Metaspriggina, the forerunners of the pineal eye may have been a functional pair of small camera eyes on the top of the head.

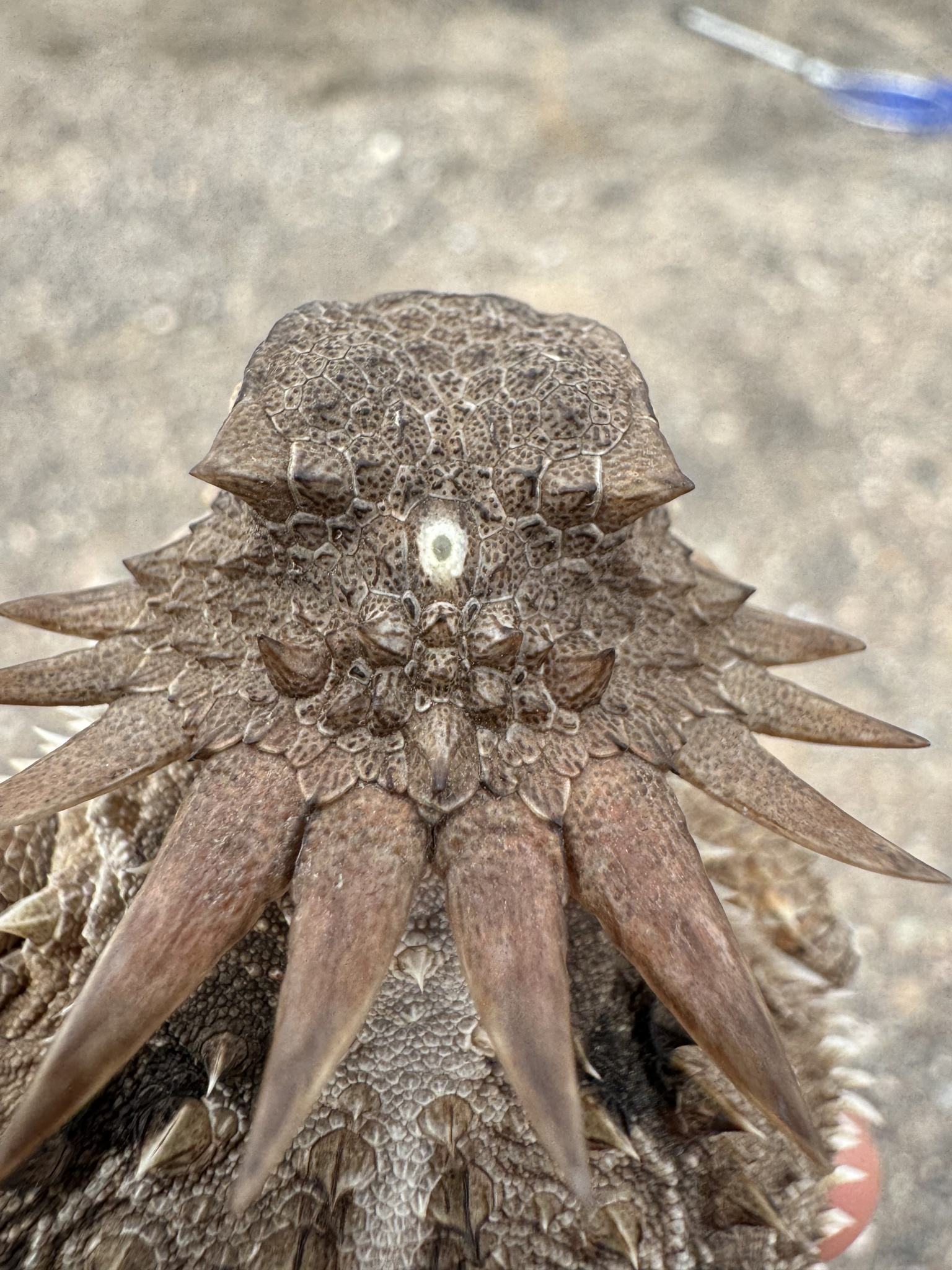
Parietal eye of a regal horned lizard (Phrynosoma solare)

The third eye is much smaller than the main paired eyes; in living species, it is always covered by skin, and is usually not readily visible externally. The parietal eye is a part of the epithalamus, which can be divided into two major parts—the epiphysis (the pineal organ; or the pineal gland, if it is mostly endocrine) and the parapineal organ (often called the parietal eye or, if it is photoreceptive, the third eye). The structures arise as a single anterior evagination of the pineal organ or as a separate outgrowth of the roof of the diencephalon; during development, it divides into two bilaterally somewhat symmetric organs, which rotate their location to become a caudal pineal organ and a parapineal organ. In some species, the parietal eye protrudes through the skull. The parietal eye uses chemical changes to detect light, rather than rod cells and cone cells as in a normal vertebrate eye.

Many of the oldest fossil vertebrates, including ostracoderms, placoderms, crossopterygians, and early tetrapods, have in their skulls sockets that appear to have held functional third eyes. The socket remains as a foramen between the parietal bones in many living amphibians and reptiles, although it has vanished in birds and mammals.

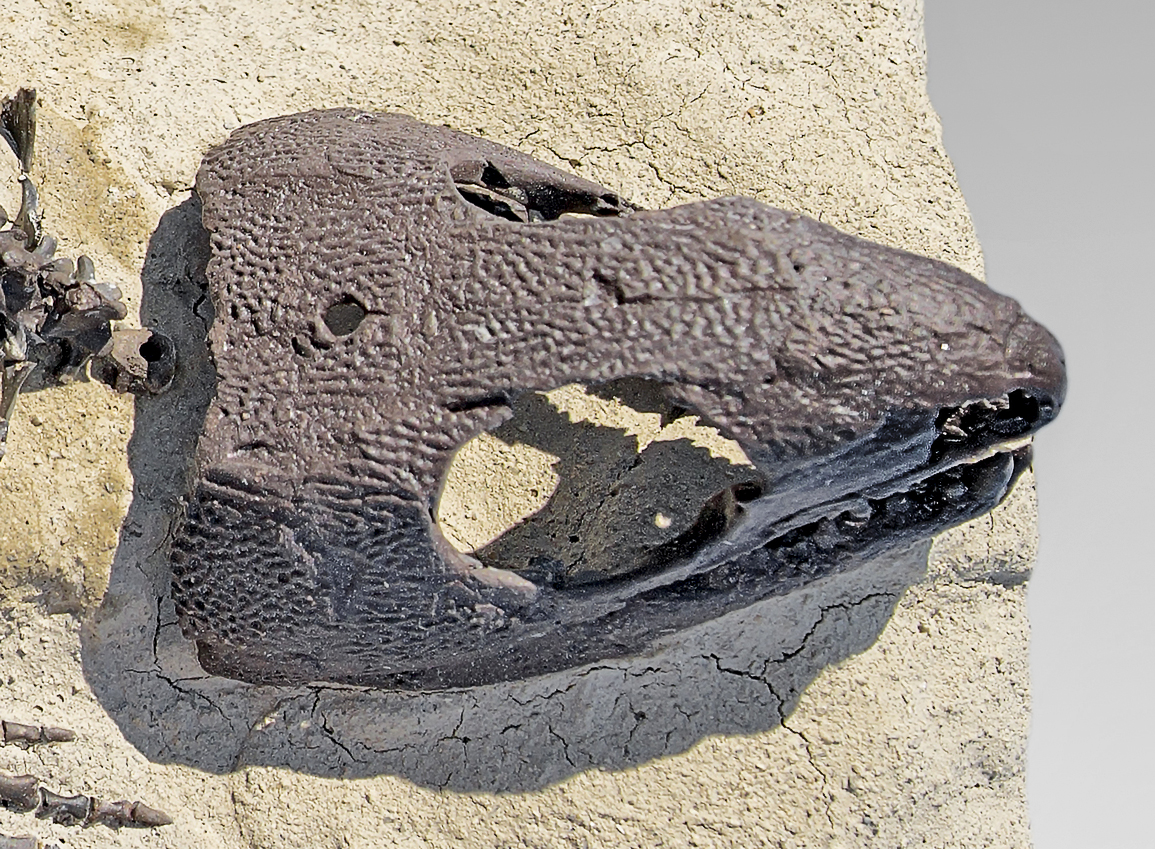
Skull of the extinct tetrapod Captorhinus, showing the pineal foramen on the midline of the skull roof

Lampreys have two parietal eyes, one that developed from the parapineal organ and the other from the pineal organ. These are one behind the other in the centre of the upper surface of the braincase. Because lampreys are among the most primitive of all living vertebrates, it is possible that was the original condition among vertebrates, and may have allowed bottom-dwelling species to sense threats from above. Saniwa, an extinct varanid lizard, probably had two parietal eyes, one that developed from the pineal organ and the other from the parapineal organ. Saniwa is the only known jawed vertebrate to have both a pineal and a parapineal eye. In most vertebrates, the pineal organ forms the parietal eye, however, in lepidosaurs it is formed from the parapineal organ, which suggests that Saniwa re-evolved the pineal eye.

== Comparative anatomy ==
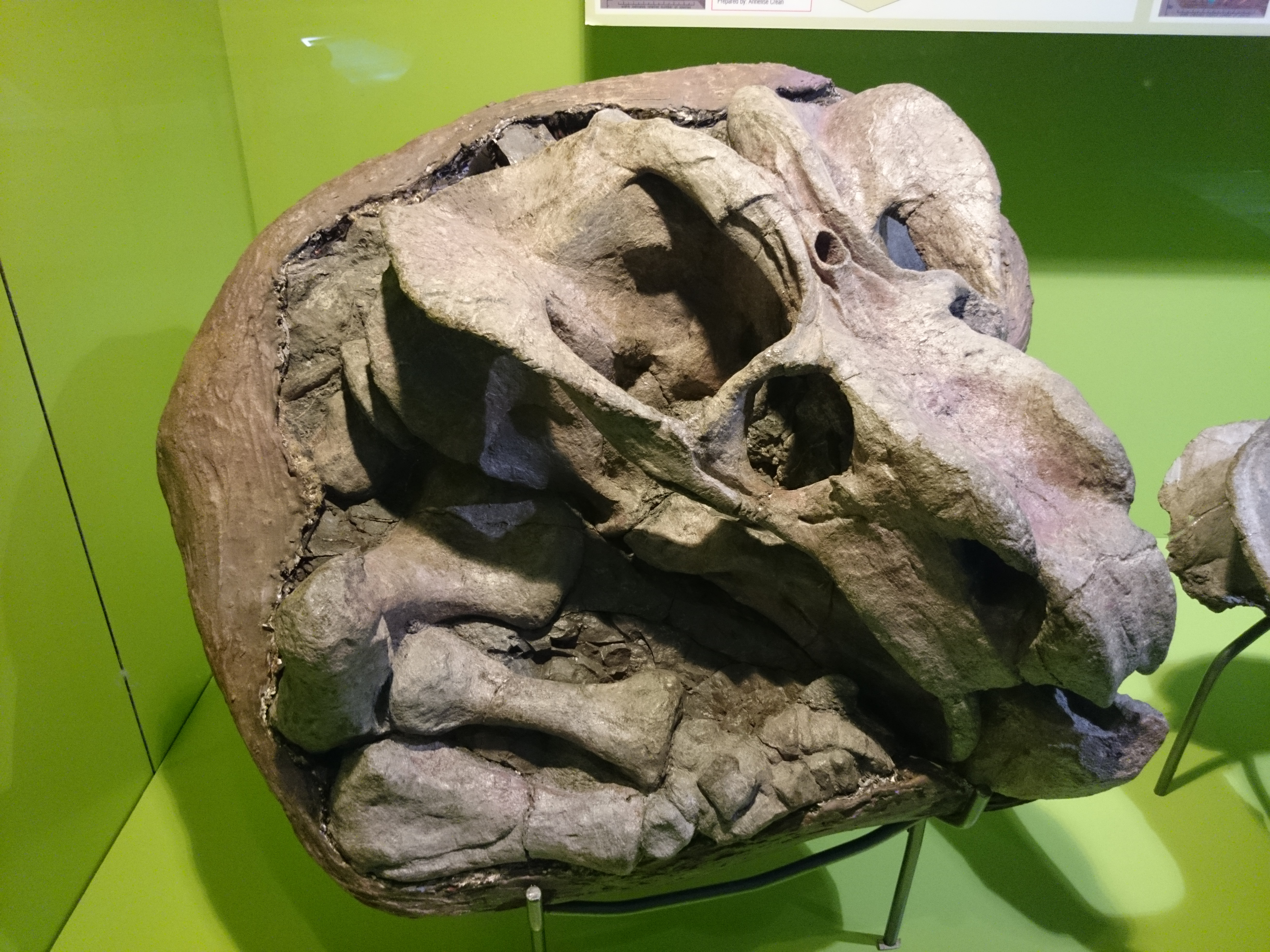
Skull of the Permian dicynodont Odontocyclops, showing a pineal foramen

The parietal eye of amphibians and reptiles appears relatively far forward in the skull; thus it may be surprising that the human pineal gland appears far away from this position, tucked away between the corpus callosum and cerebellum. Also the parietal bones, in humans, make up a portion of the rear of the skull, far from the eyes. To understand further, note that the parietal bones formed a part of the skull lying between the eyes in sarcopterygians and basal amphibians, but have moved further back in higher vertebrates. Likewise in the brain of the frog, the diencephalon, from which the pineal stalk arises, appears relatively further forward, as the cerebral hemispheres are smaller but the optic lobes are far more prominent than the human mesencephalon, which is part of the brain stem. In humans the optic tract, commissure, and optic nerve bridge the substantial distance between eyes and diencephalon. Likewise the pineal stalk of Petromyzon elongates very considerably during metamorphosis.

== Analogs in other species ==
Crustaceans at the nauplius stage (first-stage larva) have a single eye atop the head. The eye has a lens and senses the direction of light but can not resolve details. More sophisticated segmented eyes develop later on the sides of their heads, but the initial eye also stays for some time. Thus it is possible to say that, at some stage of development, crustaceans also have a "third eye". Some species, like the brine shrimp, retain the primary eye throughout all stages of their life. Most arthropods have one or more simple eyes, called ocelli, between their main, compound eyes.

== See also ==
- Arthropod eye
- Mollusc eye
- Simple eye in invertebrates
- Vision in fish
