= Thalamencephalon =

Region of the brain

Thalamencephalon, or thalamic region, or thalamic complex
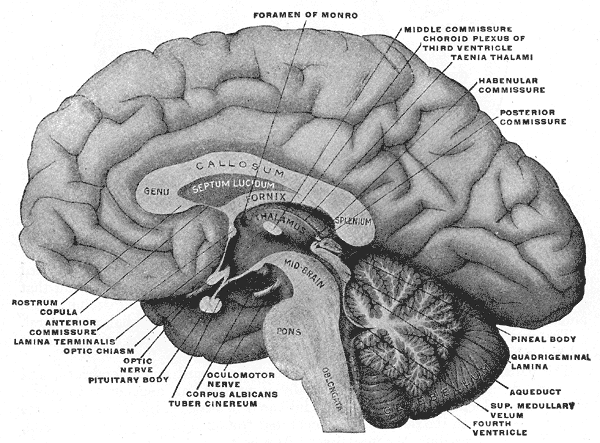
- Medial aspect of a brain sectioned in the median sagittal plane.

Details
- Part of: Diencephalon
- Parts: Thalamus, Subthalamus, Epithalamus and Metathalamus, but neither Hypothalamus nor Neurohypophysis do not belong to the thalamencephalon

Identifiers
- Latin: Thalamencephalon; Regio thalamica Complex thalamica
- FMA: 258745

Thalamencephalon (Latin: thalamencephalon), also called thalamic region (regio thalamica) or thalamic complex (complex thalamica) is a complex structure comprising thalamus (in the wider sense of the term thalamus, i.e. dorsal thalamus, or thalamus proper, plus subthalamus, or ventral thalamus) and several adjacent structures: epithalamus and metathalamus.

The thalamencephalon is phylogenetically younger part of the diencephalon than the hypothalamus and neurohypophysis, which are not considered to belong to the thalamencephalon.
