= List of Arizona state symbols =

Location of the state of Arizona in the United States of America

The state of Arizona has numerous symbols, many of which are officially recognized after a law passed by the state legislature, and were adopted in the 20th century. The first symbol was the motto, which was made official in 1864 for the Arizona Territory. Arizona became the second state to adopt a "state firearm" after Utah adopted the Browning M1911.

== Insignia ==
| Type | Symbol | Description | Year | Image |
|---|---|---|---|---|
| Flag | The flag of Arizona | The flag of Arizona does not contain a state seal but consists of 13 rays of red and gold (the conquistador colors of the flag of Spain) on the top half, representing the original 13 American colonies, as well as symbolizing Arizona's picturesque sunsets. There is a copper colored star in the center representing Arizona's copper-mining industry. The rest of the flag is colored blue, representing liberty. | 1917 | Arizona flag |
| Seal | The seal of Arizona | The Great Seal of the State of Arizona is ringed by the words "Great Seal of the State of Arizona" on the top, and 1912 the year of Arizona's statehood, on the bottom. The motto Ditat Deus (Latin: "God Enriches"), lies in the center of the seal. In the background is a range of mountains with the sun rising behind the peaks | 1911 | Arizona State Seal |

== Mottoes and nicknames ==
| Type | Symbol | Year | Image |
|---|---|---|---|
| Motto | Latin: Ditat Deus (God enriches) | 1864 | Arizona State Seal |
| Nickname | The Grand Canyon State (Note: Unofficial nicknames include: the Apache State, the Aztec State, the Baby State, the Copper State, the Valentine State, Italy of America, the Sand Hill State, and the Sunset State.) | Traditional | Arizona State Seal |

== Plants ==
| Type | Symbol | Year | Image |
|---|---|---|---|
| Flower | Saguaro cactus blossom (Carnegiea gigantea) | 1931 | Saguaro blossom |
| Tree | Palo verde (Parkinsonia florida) | 1954 | Blue palo verde |

== Animals ==
| Type | Symbol | Year | Image |
|---|---|---|---|
| Amphibian | Arizona tree frog (Hyla eximia) (Note: The Arizona treefrog was chosen by students around Arizona. The students studied 800 species in an effort to select four finalists for every category. Three other amphibians were considered: the Colorado River toad, red-spotted toad, and the spadefoot toad.) | 1986 | Arizona tree frog |
| Bird | Cactus wren (Campylorhynchus brunneicapillus) | 1973 | Cactus wren |
| Butterfly | Two-tailed swallowtail (Papilio multicaudata) | 2001 | Two-tailed swallowtail |
| Dinosaur | Sonorasaurus (Sonorasaurus thompsoni) | 2018 | Sonorasaurus |
| Fish | Apache trout (Oncorhynchus gilae apache) (Note: The Apache trout was chosen by students around Arizona. The students studied 800 species in an effort to select four finalists for every category. Three other fish were considered: the Colorado River squawfish, the desert pupfish, and the bonytail chub.) | 1986 | Apache Trout |
| Mammal | Ring-tailed cat (Bassariscus astutus) (Note: The ring-tailed cat was chosen by students around Arizona. The students studied 800 species in an effort to select four finalists for every category. Three other mammals were considered: the whitetail deer, the desert bighorn sheep, and the javelina.) | 1986 | Ring-tailed cat |
| Reptile | Arizona ridge-nosed rattlesnake (Crotalus willardi willardi) (Note: The Arizona ridge-nosed rattlesnake was chosen by students around Arizona. The students studied 800 species in an effort to select four finalists for every category. Three other reptiles were considered: the Gila monster, the desert tortoise, and the regal horned lizard.) | 1986 | Arizona ridge-nosed rattlesnake |

== Geology ==
| Type | Symbol | Year | Image |
|---|---|---|---|
| Fossil | Petrified wood | 1988 | Petrified Araucarioxylon arizonicum |
| Gemstone | Turquoise | 1974 | Turquoise |
| Metal | Copper | 2015 | Copper |
| Mineral | Wulfenite | 2017 | Wulfenite |
| Soil | Casa Grande | N/A | |

== Culture ==
| Type | Symbol | Year | Image |
|---|---|---|---|
| Colors | Blue and old gold | 1915 | |
| Firearm | Colt Single Action Army | 2011 | Colt Single Action Army |
| Neckwear | Bolo tie | 1973 | Bolo tie |
| Songs | "Arizona March Song" "Arizona" | 1919; 1982 | |
| Drink | Lemonade | 2019 | Lemonade |

== Other ==
| Type | Symbol | Year | Image |
|---|---|---|---|
| Planet | Pluto (Note: The International Astronomical Union classifies Pluto as a dwarf planet.) | 2024 | Pluto |

== See also ==
- List of Arizona-related topics
- Lists of United States state insignia
- Vehicle registration plates of Arizona
