= Taenia =

Taenia or tænia, from Greek ταινία (tainía) and Latin taenia (both meaning 'tape' or 'ribbon') may refer to:

== Anatomy ==
- Taenia coli, three separate longitudinal ribbons of smooth muscle of the large intestine
- Taenia thalami, a superior surface of the thalamus of the mammal brain
- Taenia of fourth ventricle, two narrow bands of white matter of the mammal brain

== Zoology ==
- Taenia (flatworm), a tapeworm genus
- Cepola or Taenia, a bandfish genus
- Tinea (moth) or Taenia, a fungus moth genus
- Taenia, a Scarabaeidae genus

== Other uses ==
- Taenia (architecture), a small fillet molding near the top of the architrave in a Doric column
- Tainia (costume) or Taenia, a ribbon worn in the hair in ancient Greece

== See also ==
- Ribbon
