= Diencephalic syndrome =

- Other names: Diencephalic syndrome of emaciation
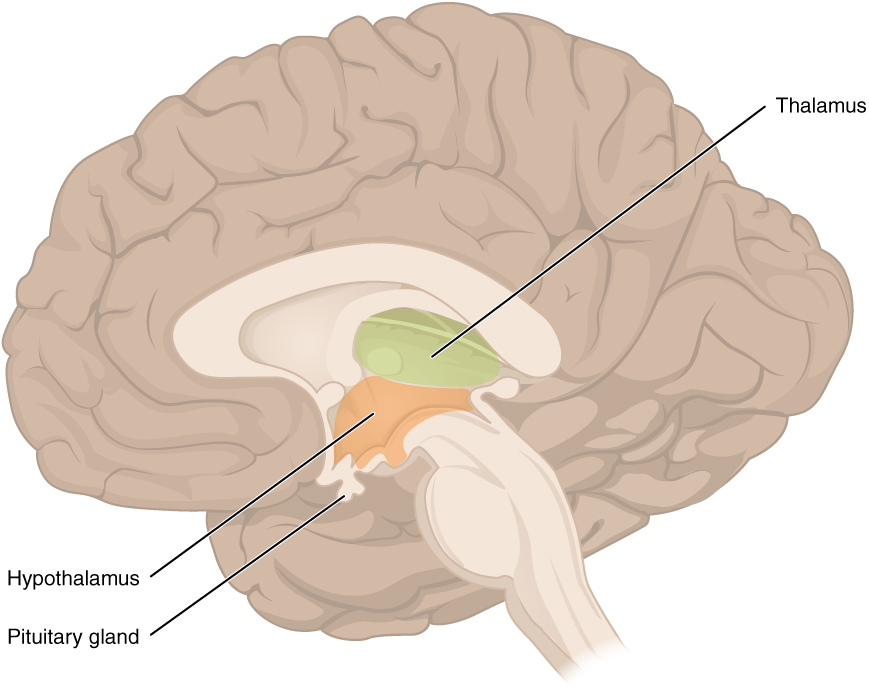
- The diencephalon, which is affected by diencaphalic syndrome, consists of the thalamus, the subthalamus, the hypothalamus, and the epithalamus.
- Specialty: Neurology

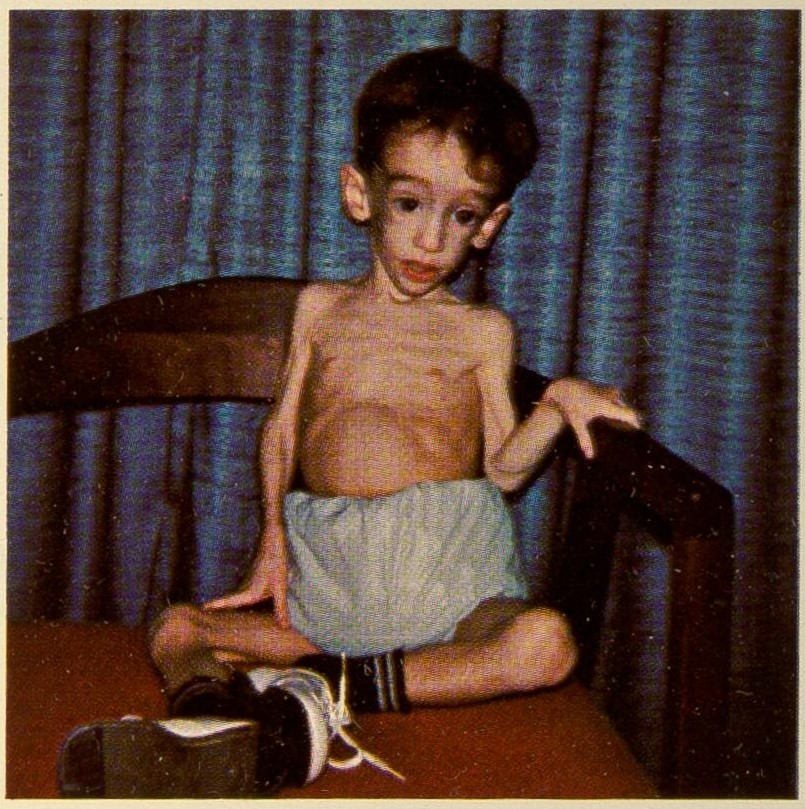
Weight loss from diencephalic syndrome

Diencephalic syndrome, or Russell's syndrome, is a rare neurological disorder seen in infants and children and characterised by failure to thrive and severe emaciation despite normal or slightly decreased caloric intake. Classically there is also locomotor hyperactivity and euphoria. Less commonly diencephalic syndrome may involve skin pallor without anaemia, hypoglycaemia, and hypotension. The syndrome is a rare but potentially fatal cause of failure to thrive in children. Failure to thrive presents on average at seven months of age. Of note the syndrome is not associated with developmental delay. There may be associated hydrocephalus.

Diencephalic syndrome was first described by Dr. A. Russell in 1951. It is usually caused by a brain tumor such as a low-grade glioma or astrocytoma located in the hypothalamic-optic chiasmatic region. It is not yet understood how diencephalic syndrome causes the effects on appetite and metabolism which are seen, though inappropriately high growth hormone release has been proposed, as has excessive β-lipotropin secretion and overall increased metabolic demand. It is treated with nutritional optimisation while the underlying lesion is treated with chemotherapy, surgery or radiotherapy.
