= Seal of Arizona =

Official government emblem of the U.S. state of Arizona

The Great Seal of the State of Arizona

Versions
- Coat of arms

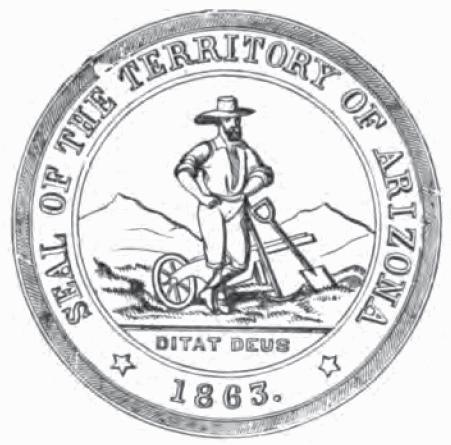
- Original Territorial seal

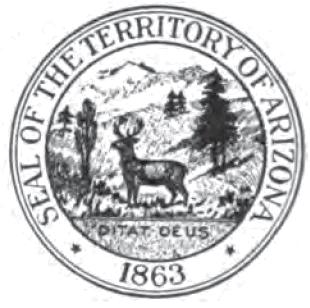
- Second Territorial seal
- Armiger: State of Arizona
- Adopted: 1912
- Motto: Ditat Deus (God enriches)

The great seal of the state of Arizona is the state seal of the U.S. state of Arizona as designated in the state constitution. Article 22, Section 20 of the State of Arizona Constitution by the Arizona State Legislature details the design and use of the seal.

== Design ==
Section 20. "The seal of the State shall be of the following design: In the background shall be a range of mountains, with the sun rising behind the peaks thereof, and at the right side of the range of mountains there shall be a storage reservoir and a dam, below which in the middle distance are irrigated fields and orchards reaching into the foreground, at the right of which are cattle grazing. To the left in the middle distance on a mountainside is a quartz mill in front of which and in the foreground is a miner standing with pick and shovel. Above this device shall be the motto: "Ditat Deus." In a circular band surrounding the whole device shall be inscribed: "Great Seal of The State of Arizona", with the year of admission of the State into the Union."

The seal is often described as depicting Arizona's "five C's" of Copper, Cattle, Cotton, Citrus, and Climate.

The miner depicted on the state seal is George Warren, who had the original mining claim in Bisbee, Arizona in 1877, and for whom the town of Warren, Arizona is named.

== Legal Use ==
According to state statute (Arizona law) the Secretary of State of Arizona is the keeper of the seal and may grant a certificate of approval for a state agency. The seal cannot be used outside of state government. Requests for use of the seal must be made in writing, directly to the Office of the Secretary of State.

It cannot be used for commercial purposes under Arizona state law. Any person who knowingly violates this law is guilty of a Class 3 misdemeanor.

== History ==
The official Arizona State Seal was designed by Phoenix newspaper artist, E.E. Motter. The official seal was decided after a long debate at the Arizona constitutional convention and established with statehood in 1912.

Several territorial seals were used before statehood, between 1863 and 1912. Like the existing seal, these seals depicted the state motto and a mountain landscape. Some of them also centered on a miner, while others focused on the image of a deer instead.

History and a downloadable brochure can be found on the secretary's website.

== See also ==
- List of Arizona state symbols
- Flag of Arizona
