= Stria medullaris =

Part of the epithalamus

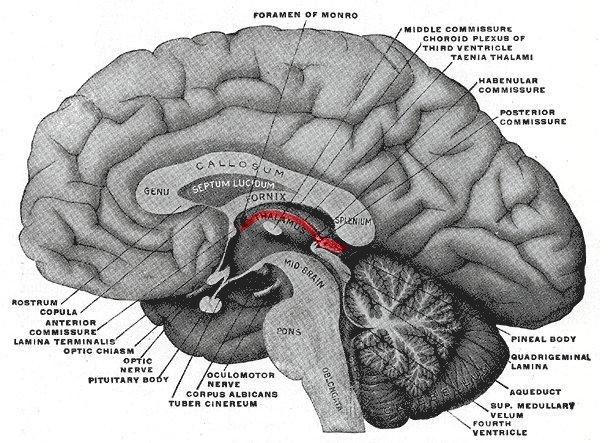
- Stria medullaris highlighted in red over the thalamus. Posterior to the thalamus, the highlighted portion is the pineal gland

Details

Identifiers
- Latin: stria medullaris thalamica
- NeuroNames: 298
- NeuroLex ID: birnlex_1066
- TA98: A14.1.08.106
- TA2: 5747
- FMA: 62080

The stria medullaris (SM), (Latin, furrow and pith or marrow) is a part of the epithalamus and forms a bilateral white matter tract of the initial segment of the dorsal diencephalic conduction system (DDCS). It contains afferent fibers from the septal nuclei, lateral preoptico-hypothalamic region, and anterior thalamic nuclei to the habenula. It forms a horizontal ridge on the medial surface of the thalamus on the border between dorsal and medial surfaces of the thalamus. The SM, in conjunction with the habenula and the habenular commissure, forms the habenular trigone. It is considered to be the primary afferent of the DDCS.

== History ==
Vesalius showed it in his 1543 De Humani Corporis Fabrica Libri Septem. It first received its present name from Wenzel and Wenzel in 1812. The SM can be referred to as the stria medullaris thalami or habenular stria. Historically it has also been called the columna medullaris, markiger Streisen and rené. It was once thought to be part of the olfactory system.

== Anatomy ==
The SM emerges as a bilateral compact fascicle just posterior to the anterior commissure, where it converges with the fornix and stria terminalis. As it courses caudally along the third ventricle's roof, it attaches to the tela chordae and arches dorsally over the thalamus. In the majority of individuals, it arches superior to the interthalamic adhesion. The SM then descends caudally, with its lateral fibers terminating in the habenula. The medial SM fibers, on the other hand, flex inwards towards the pineal gland's base, crossing to the opposite side and terminating in the contralateral habenula. This crossing is known as the habenular commissure.

== Function ==
The SM primarily gathers fibers from various brain regions, including the frontal, septal, striatal, and hypothalamic areas, and conveys information to the lateral and medial habenulae. It operates in a predominantly unidirectional manner, transmitting input from forebrain regions to the habenula. The SM's afferents are primarily cholinergic, glutamatergic, and GABAergic. Bilateral transection of the SM in rodents causes decreases of enzymes in the habenulae, indicating functional importance there.

== Clinical significance ==
The SM, in conjunction with the habenula, has been identified as a potential therapeutic target for deep brain stimulation in the treatment of intractable depression. Preliminary results suggest significant improvement with modulation of the DDCS through SM stimulation. Given the intertwined nature of the SM and habenula, it is challenging to define a function for the SM independent of the habenula.

== Sources ==
- Roman, Elena; Weininger, Joshua; Lim, Basil; Roman, Marin; Barry, Denis; Tierney, Paul; O’Hanlon, Erik; Levins, Kirk; O’Keane, Veronica; Roddy, Darren (2020). "Untangling the dorsal diencephalic conduction system: a review of structure and function of the stria medullaris, habenula and fasciculus retroflexus". Brain Structure and Function. 225 (5): 1437–1458. doi:10.1007/s00429-020-02069-8. ISSN 1863-2653. PMID 32367265. S2CID 218495735.
- Juárez-Leal, Iris; Carretero-Rodríguez, Estefanía; Almagro-García, Francisca; Martínez, Salvador; Echevarría, Diego; Puelles, Eduardo (2022). "Stria medullaris innervation follows the transcriptomic division of the habenula". Scientific Reports. 12 (1): 10118. doi:10.1038/s41598-022-14328-1. ISSN 2045-2322. PMC 9203815. PMID 35710872.
- Roddy, Darren W.; Roman, Elena; Rooney, Shane; Andrews, Sinaoife; Farrell, Chloe; Doolin, Kelly; Levins, Kirk J.; Tozzi, Leonardo; Tierney, Paul; Barry, Denis; Frodl, Thomas; O’Keane, Veronica; O’Hanlon, Erik (2018). "Awakening Neuropsychiatric Research Into the Stria Medullaris: Development of a Diffusion-Weighted Imaging Tractography Protocol of This Key Limbic Structure". Frontiers in Neuroanatomy. 12: 39. doi:10.3389/fnana.2018.00039. ISSN 1662-5129. PMC 5952041. PMID 29867378.
