= Flag of Arizona =

U.S. state flag

Arizona
- Use: Civil and state flag
- Proportion: 2:3
- Adopted: February 27, 1917; 109 years ago
- Design: Thirteen red and gold rays on the top half and blue on the lower half, with a copper star in the center.

The flag of Arizona is the official flag of the U.S. state of Arizona. It consists of 13 rays of red and gold on the top half. The center star signifies copper production; Arizona is rich in copper, producing more copper than other states in the country.

The height of the flag is two units high while the width is three units wide. The flag of Arizona consists of 13 red and gold rays in the upper half, representing the thirteen colonies and the colors of the flag of Spain, in homage to the Spanish discoverers who came to these lands, such as Álvar Núñez Cabeza de Vaca and Francisco Vázquez de Coronado. In the center of the flag, the copper star symbolizes the mining industry of this state, is one unit high, while the rest of the flag is covered by a blue section measuring one unit high and three units wide. The lower half is dark blue, representing the Colorado River. The suggested flag size is 4 by 6 ft (1.2 by 1.8 m), with the star being 2 ft (0.6 m) tall.

== Statute ==
According to the 2024 Arizona Revised Statutes (Title 41, § 41-851), the state flag shall be of the following design:

The lower half of the flag a blue field and the upper half divided into thirteen equal segments or rays which shall start at the center on the lower line and continue to the edges of the flag, colored alternately light yellow and red, consisting of six yellow and seven red rays. In the center of the flag, superimposed, there shall be a copper-colored five pointed star, so placed that the upper points shall be one foot from the top of the flag and the lower points one foot from the bottom of the flag. The red and blue shall be the same shade as the colors in the flag of the United States. The flag shall have a four-foot hoist and a six-foot fly, with a two-foot star and the same proportions shall be observed for flags of other sizes.

== History ==
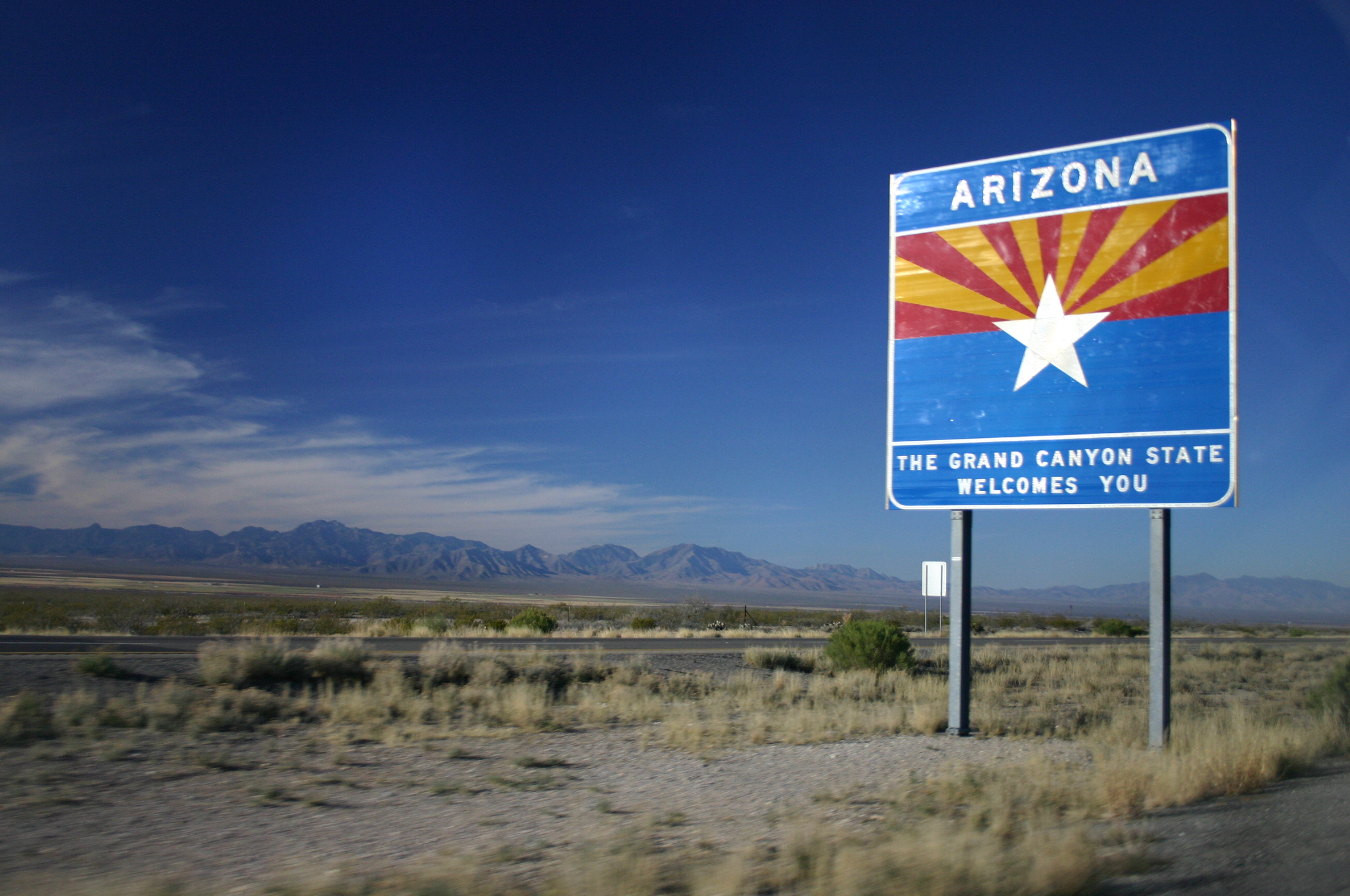
The state flag on a welcome sign

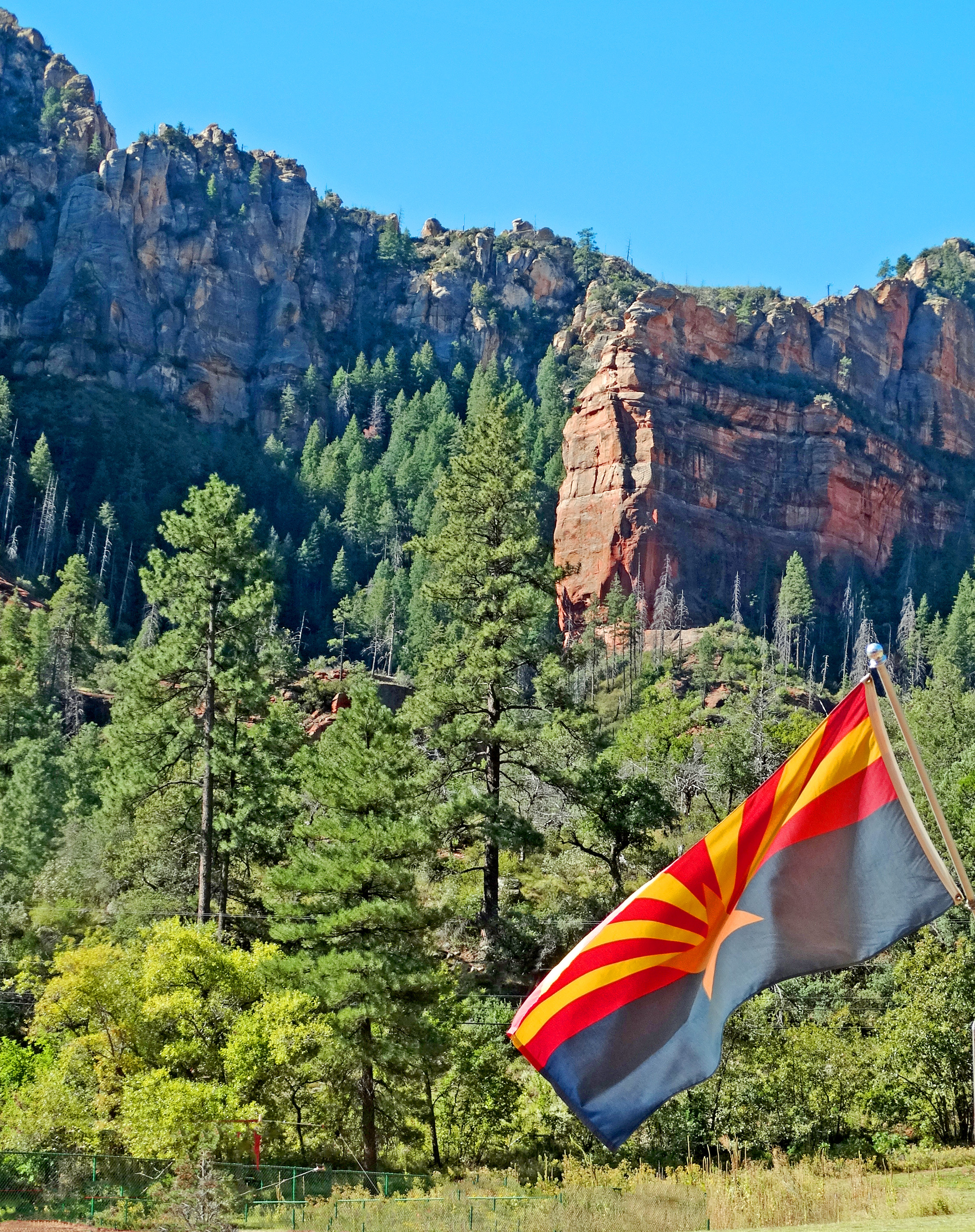
State flag in Slide Rock State Park near Sedona, Arizona

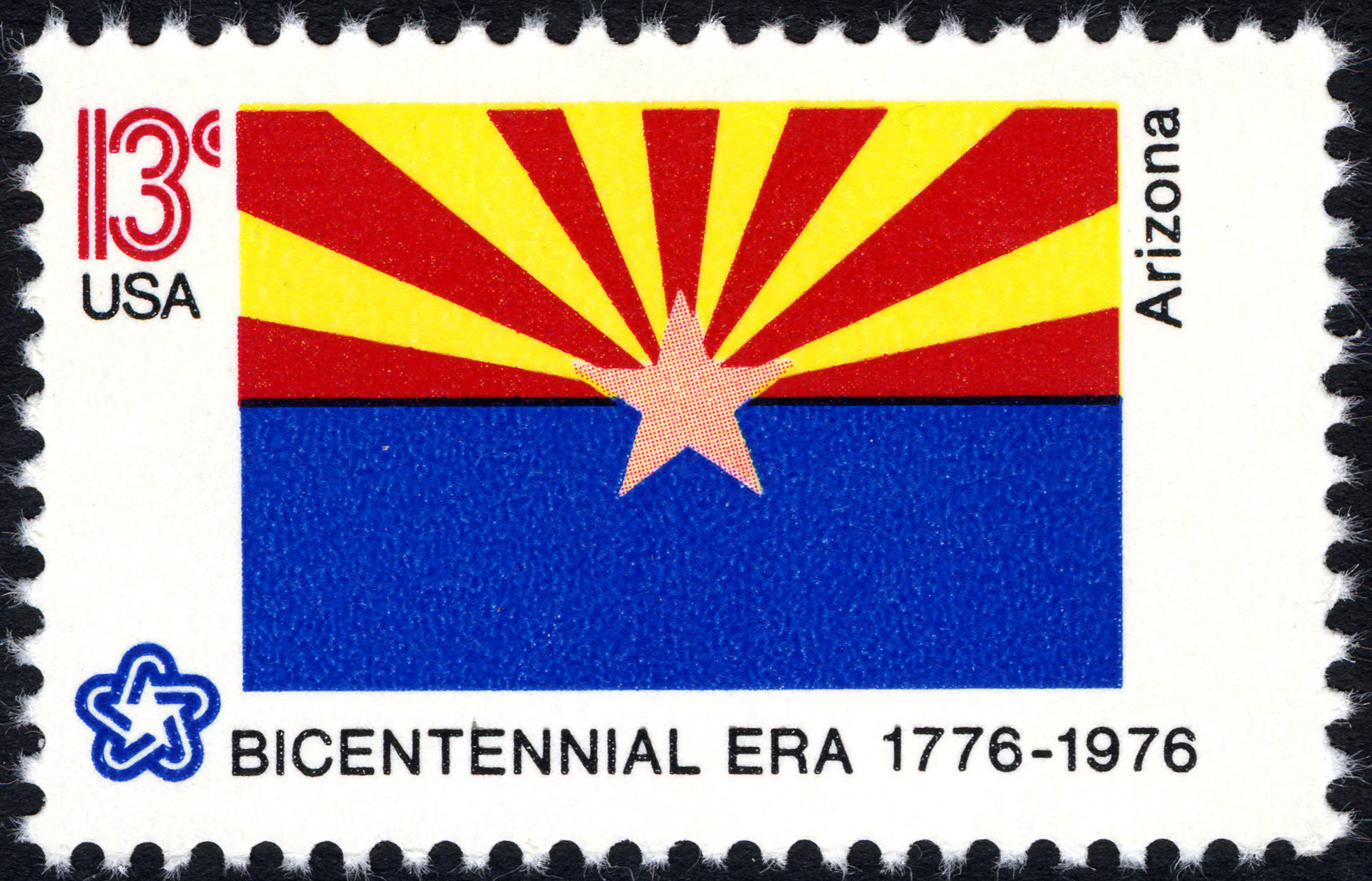
The Arizona state flag as depicted in the 1976 bicentennial postage stamp series

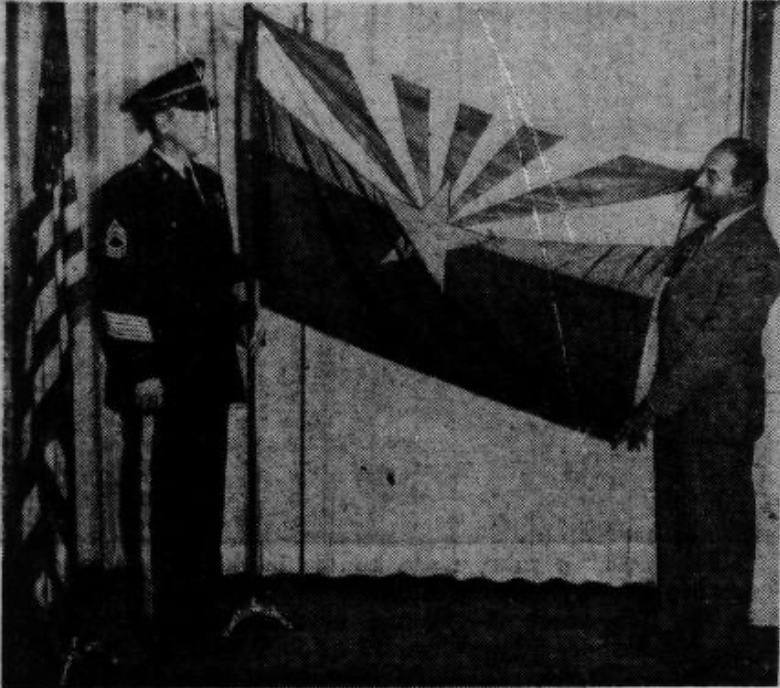
State flag from 1955

The state of Arizona's website, museum, and official materials cite the following origins of the Arizona flag:

Charles Wilfred Harris, Colonel in the Arizona National Guard, served as the captain of the unit's rifle team in 1910. During the rifle competition at Camp Perry, Ohio, the Arizona team was the only team without an emblem of any kind. Colonel Harris was chiefly responsible for the creation of the rifle team flag that in 1917 became the Arizona State Flag. Blue and gold are the colors of Arizona. Red and gold are the colors carried by Coronado's Expedition of 1540 to the Seven Cities of Cibola. The blue is "liberty blue" identical to the color in the United States flag field of stars. Since Arizona is a western state, the rays of the setting sun seemed appropriate. There are thirteen rays representing the original "thirteen colonies". The large copper star identifies Arizona as the largest producer of copper in the United States.

While Harris is credited with the creation of the Rifle Team flag, several individuals appear to have played a role in the design of the state's first official flag, including Rachael Berry, Arizona's first elected female state representative. W. R. Stewart of Mesa was working in conjunction with Harris, who was the Arizona adjutant general and head of the Arizona National Guard. Stewart, as president of the Mesa Rifle Team, felt compelled to design a flag for competition. Reportedly, Stewart's wife Mae sewed the first flag for competition from a sketch he had made on the back of an envelope. Carl Hayden, Arizona's first U.S. Representative, was reported to have been involved with Harris in designing the first state flag, and his wife, Nan Hayden, was responsible for sewing the first state flag.

Other individuals were also likely involved in its conception, design, and production. The Stewart and Harris version of the competition flag's origin is due to Stewart dropping some copper dye and white material into boiling water and the result was the copper color now seen on the flag. While some sources claim the rising sun of the earlier proposals was thought to resemble the Japanese flag and was therefore changed to the present star, other sources (including official state documents) cite the Spanish flag and the influence of early Arizona explorers, such as Álvar Núñez Cabeza de Vaca and Francisco Vázquez de Coronado, as they searched unsuccessfully for the lost gold city of Cibola as the inspiration for the colors. However, these early explorers never used the current Spanish flag, which is of much more recent design (1785).

The flag was adopted on February 27, 1917, by the 3rd Arizona Legislature. It was passed into law without the signature of Governor Thomas Campbell. The governor never officially specified his reasons for not taking any action on the bill.

There was variant of the state flag carried by the national guard in September of 1917. Unlike the normal state flag it bore the inscription: "First Arizona Infantry," on the blue field.

In a 2001 poll conducted by the North American Vexillological Association, the Arizona flag was identified as one of the "10 best flags on the continent," ranking sixth of 72 North American flags for overall design quality.

During the 2024–2025 Belgian government formation, the coalition proposal consisting of the parties New Flemish Alliance (yellow), Reformist Movement (blue), Vooruit (red), Christian Democratic and Flemish, and Les Engagés (orange) came to be known as the "Arizona coalition" due to the respective party colors resembling the flag of Arizona. This coalition ultimately formed the succeeding government.

== See also ==
- Great Seal of the State of Arizona
- List of Arizona state symbols
- Flag of the Navajo Nation
