= Diencephalon =

Division of the forebrain around the third ventricle

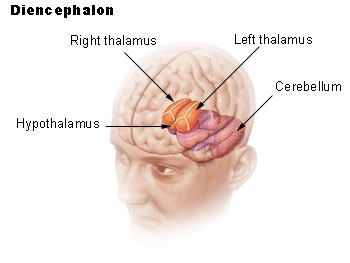
- The hypothalamus and the right and left halves of the thalamus are labeled. The cerebellum is not part of the diencephalon.

Details
- Precursor: Prosencephalon, derived from the neural tube
- Part of: Human brain
- Parts: Thalamus, the hypothalamus, the epithalamus and the subthalamus

Identifiers
- Latin: diencephalon
- MeSH: D004027
- NeuroLex ID: birnlex_1503
- TA98: A14.1.03.007; A14.1.08.001
- TA2: 5661
- TH: H3.11.03.5.00001
- FMA: 62001

In the human brain, the diencephalon (or interbrain) is a division of the forebrain (embryonic prosencephalon). It is situated between the telencephalon and the midbrain (embryonic mesencephalon). The diencephalon has also been known as the tweenbrain in older literature. It consists of structures that are on either side of the third ventricle, including the thalamus, the hypothalamus, the epithalamus and the subthalamus.

The diencephalon is one of the main vesicles of the brain formed during embryonic development. During the third week of development a neural tube is created from the ectoderm, one of the three primary germ layers, and forms three main vesicles: the prosencephalon, the mesencephalon and the rhombencephalon. The prosencephalon gradually divides into the telencephalon (the cerebrum) and the diencephalon.

== Structure ==
The diencephalon consists of the following structures:

- Thalamus
- Hypothalamus including the posterior pituitary
- Epithalamus which consists of:
  - Anterior and posterior paraventricular nuclei
  - Medial and lateral habenular nuclei
  - Stria medullaris thalami
  - Posterior commissure
  - Pineal body
- Subthalamus

=== Attachments ===
The optic nerve (CNII) attaches to the diencephalon. The optic nerve is a sensory (afferent) nerve responsible for vision and sight; it runs from the eye through the optic canal in the skull and attaches to the diencephalon. The retina itself is derived from the optic cup, a part of the embryonic diencephalon.

== Function ==
The diencephalon is the region of the embryonic vertebrate neural tube that gives rise to anterior forebrain structures including the thalamus, hypothalamus, posterior portion of the pituitary gland, and the pineal gland. The diencephalon encloses a cavity called the third ventricle. The thalamus serves as a relay centre for sensory and motor impulses to and from the cerebrum, relaying sensory information from all senses besides smell. The hypothalamus is located in the floor of the third ventricle, and has multiple functions including managing hormones in the endocrine system.

== Additional images ==
Diagram depicting the main subdivisions of the embryonic vertebrate brain. These regions will later differentiate into forebrain, midbrain and hindbrain structures.

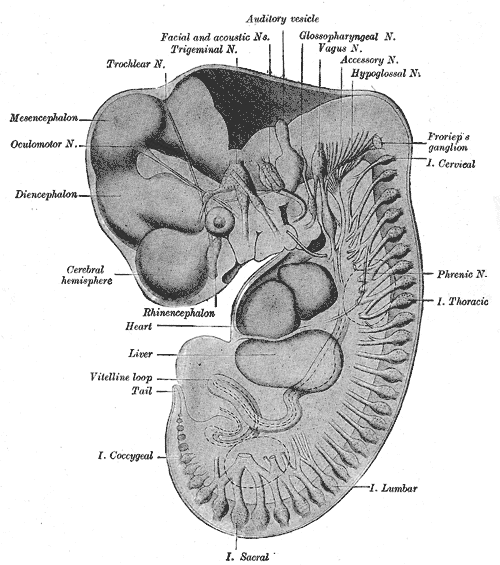
Reconstruction of peripheral nerves of a human embryo of 10.2 mm. (Label for Diencephalon is at left.)

== See also ==
- Diencephalic syndrome
- List of regions in the human brain
