= Habenular trigone =

Structure in the brain

Details

Identifiers
- Latin: trigonum habenulae
- NeuroNames: 293
- TA98: A14.1.08.005
- TA2: 5663
- FMA: 74868

The habenular trigone is a small depressed triangular area situated (sources differ) anterior/superior to the superior colliculus. It contains the habenular nuclei.

== Anatomy ==
The habenular trigone is situated on the lateral aspect of the posterior part of the taenia thalami.
