= Epithalamus =

Posterior segment of the diencephalon in the brain

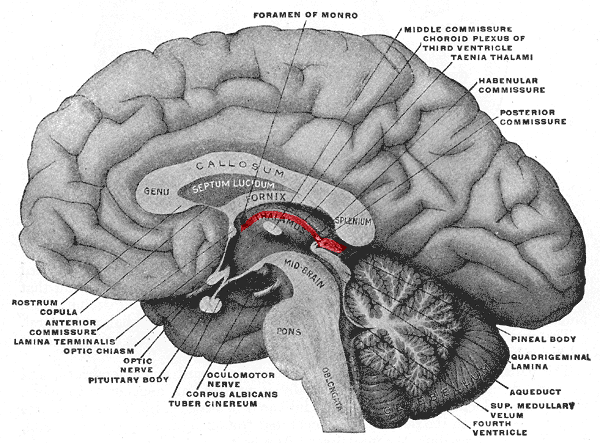
- Aspect of a brain sectioned in the median sagittal plane. Epithalamus labeled in red, by "habenular commissure", "pineal body", and "posterior commissure", with its projection anteriorly consisting stria medullaris

Details
- Part of: Posterior segment of the diencephalon. The epithalamus includes the habenular nuclei, the stria medullaris, the anterior and posterior paraventricular nuclei, the posterior commissure, and the pineal gland.

Identifiers
- Latin: epithalamus
- MeSH: D019261
- NeuroNames: 292
- NeuroLex ID: birnlex_1710
- TA98: A14.1.08.002; A14.1.08.501
- TA2: 5675
- FMA: 62009

The epithalamus (pl.: epithalami) is a posterior (dorsal) segment of the diencephalon. The epithalamus includes the habenular nuclei, the stria medullaris, the anterior and posterior paraventricular nuclei, the posterior commissure, and the pineal gland.

== Functions ==
The function of the epithalamus is to connect the limbic system to other parts of the brain. The epithalamus also serves as a connecting point for the dorsal diencephalic conduction system, which is responsible for carrying information from the limbic forebrain to limbic midbrain structures. Some functions of its components include the secretion of melatonin from the pineal gland (circadian rhythms), regulation of motor pathways and emotions, and how energy is conserved in the body.

A study has shown that the lateral habenula, in the epithalamus, produces spontaneous theta oscillatory activity that was correlated with theta oscillation in the hippocampus. The same study also found that the increase in theta waves in both lateral habenula and hippocampus was correlated with increased memory performance in rats. This suggests that the lateral habenula has an interaction with the hippocampus that is involved in hippocampus-dependent spatial information processing.

== Components ==
The epithalamus is a tiny structure that comprises the habenular trigone, the pineal gland, and the habenular commissure. It is wired with the limbic system and basal ganglia.

Species that possess a photoreceptive parapineal organ show asymmetry in the epithalamus at the habenula, to the left (dorsal).

== Clinical significance ==
Dysfunction of the epithalamus can be related to mood disorders such as major depression, schizophrenia, and sleeping disorders. Low levels of melatonin will typically give rise to mood disorders.

Calcification of the epithalamus can be linked to periventricular lesions near the limbic system, and lesions of cortico-subcortical pathways that are involved with schizophrenia.

== Sleep disorders ==
The epithalamus is associated with sleep disorders like insomnia revolving around circadian rhythms of sleep wake cycles. The close connection of the epithalamus with the limbic system regulates the secretion of melatonin by the pineal gland and the regulation of motor pathways and emotions. The secretion of melatonin happens in a cycle. Secretion is high at night or in the absence of light and low during the day. The suprachiasmatic nucleus in the hypothalamus is responsible for this cycle of secretion from the epithalamus, specifically from the pineal gland. The Circadian timekeeping is driven in cells by the cyclical activity of core clock genes and proteins such as per2/PER2. Gamma-aminobutyric acid and several peptide factors, including cytokines, growth hormone-releasing hormone and prolactin, are related to sleep promotion.
