= Taenia thalami =

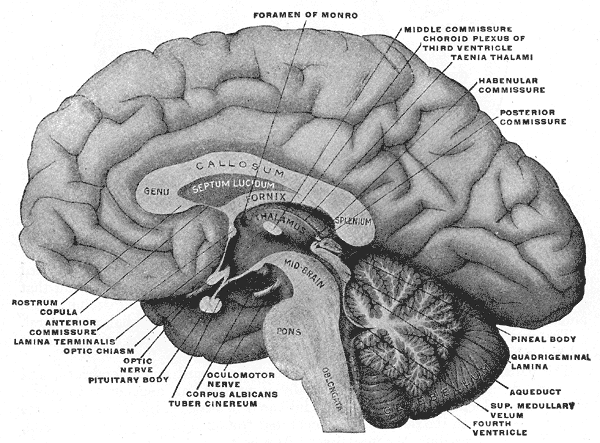
- Mesal aspect of a brain sectioned in the median sagittal plane (taenia thalami labeled at upper right)

Details

Identifiers
- Latin: taenia thalami
- NeuroNames: 448
- TA98: A14.1.08.105
- TA2: 5785
- FMA: 78461

In the front, superior surface of the thalamus but separate from the inner, medial surface by a salient margin is the taenia thalami (Latin for "flat band" of the thalamus). The bottom epithelial lining of the third ventricle is in between the tela choroidea and the taenia thalami.
