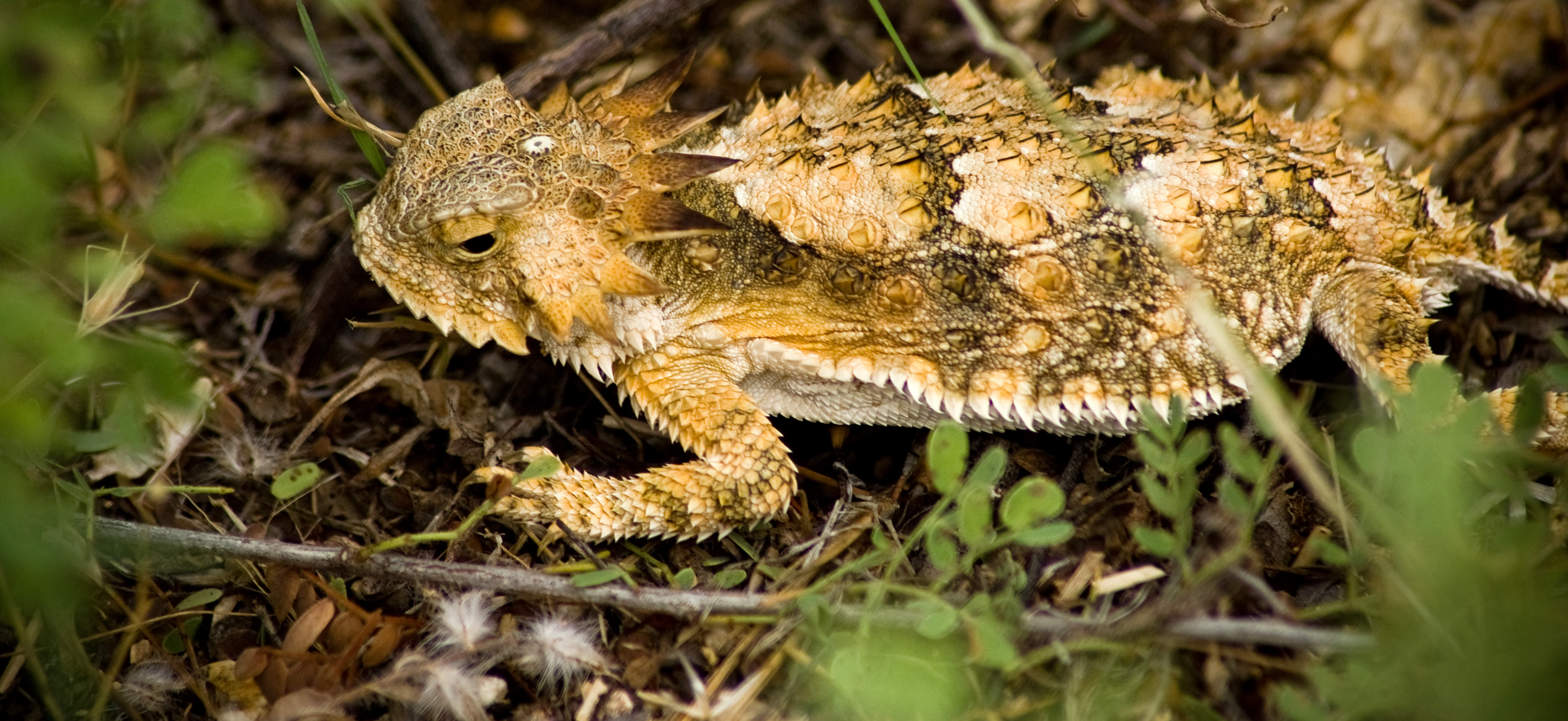

Conservation status
- Least Concern (IUCN 3.1)

Scientific classification
- Kingdom: Animalia
- Phylum: Chordata
- Class: Reptilia
- Order: Squamata
- Suborder: Iguania
- Family: Phrynosomatidae
- Genus: Phrynosoma
- Species: P. solare

Binomial name
- Phrynosoma solare Gray, 1845

= Regal horned lizard =

Species of lizard

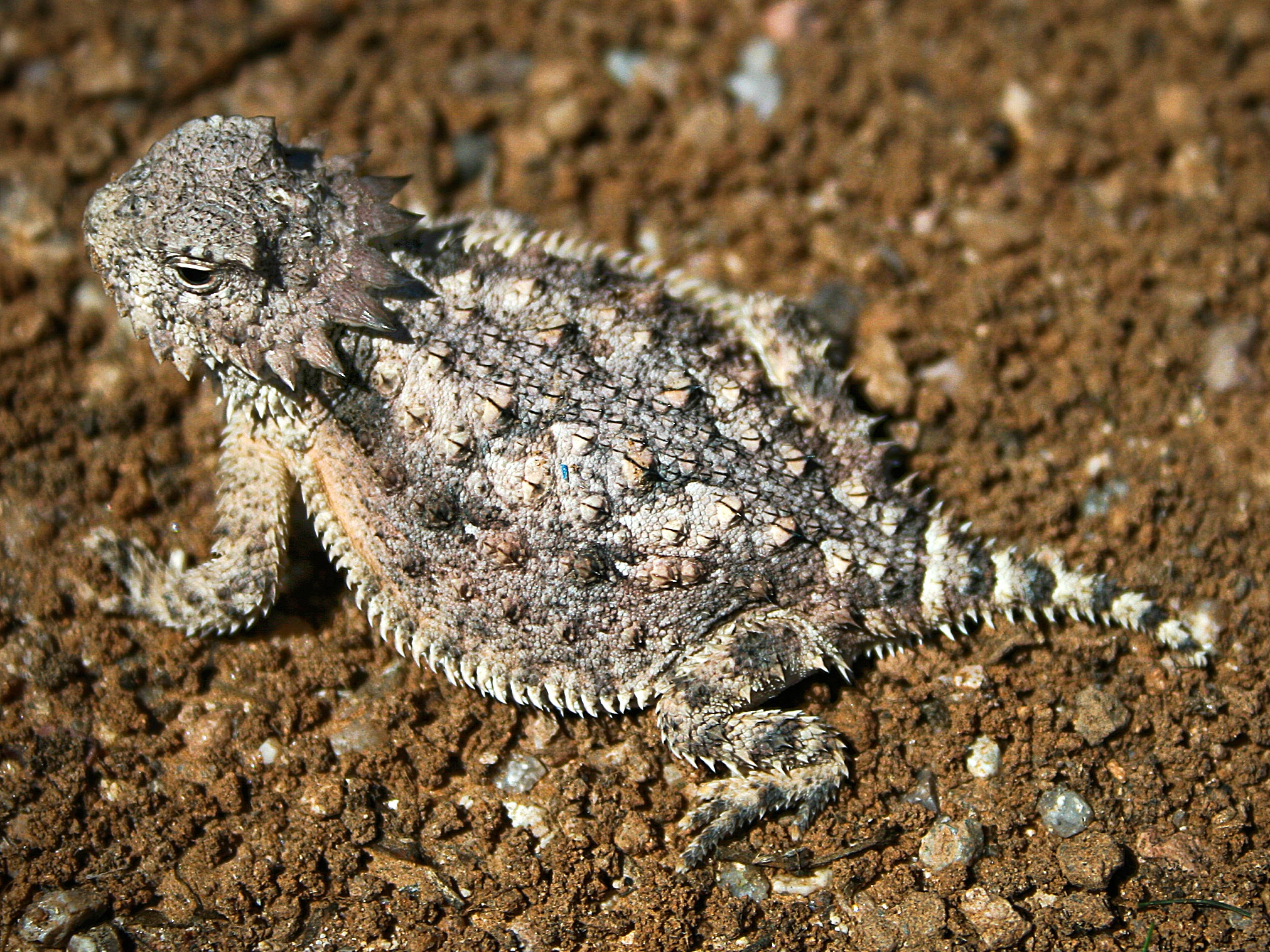
Regal horned lizard

The regal horned lizard (Phrynosoma solare) is a horned lizard species native to Mexico and the Southwest United States.

== Description ==
The regal horned lizard is a small, flat lizard about the size of the palm of a human's hand. It has spikes all around the lateral surface of its body. It is 3–4 in (117 mm) in length from nose to tail as a full adult, and pale grey to yellow-brown or reddish in color, topped with dark blotches alongside the body and back. Its four legs each have five toes with a claw on each toe. The species is a slow runner that uses camouflage to escape predators.

== Distribution ==
This lizard can be found across southeastern Arizona and along the transition of the southern zone of the central mountains region.

== Habitat and home range ==
This horned lizard occupies primarily level or gently sloping terrain with openly spaced desert vegetation such as mesquite, creosote bush, and saguaro cactus. It can be found primarily in a hot and dry climate where the ground may be covered in limestone dust. It is found in the Sonoran Desert Mountains is where it prefers its climate, but can be found in Texas, southern California, Arizona, and New Mexico. It has been shown to have a relatively small home range of roughly 160 yards (146 meters).

== Diet ==
Their diet consists almost exclusively of harvester ants and can eat 2500 ants in one meal. They are slow eaters because they spend most of their time in the intense heat of the desert during meals. They have been observed consuming some other insects and spiders.

== Behavior ==
Adult regal horned lizards are active year round; however, they are most active from April to September during the hours of 6:00 to 9:00 a.m. During winter, their activity is usually restricted to unseasonably warm days. They may hibernate late September through October. They tend to be sedentary creatures which is reflected in their morphology (often displaying matching color patterns to their environment as camouflage). This is also reflected in their limited home range. The regal horned lizard will often bask in the sun with only its head poking out of the sand in order to heat blood located within a chamber inside the head. When the blood is warm enough, the lizard opens a valve in its neck and circulates the blood around the body. It derives shelter and builds nests through digging holes in the ground. They seem to be very protective of these nests as one study observed a female placing herself between the hole and the researcher. Typically they remain still above ground until temperatures reach above 52.2 °C (126.0 °F). Regal horned lizards generally stay in an open habitat with access to burrows to avoid predators and high temperatures. Though they have spikes all around their body, their main defense when coming in contact with predators is the ability to squirt blood from their eyes. When they are threatened or captured, they may exhibit this blood squirting behavior. This blood may have a taste used to deter predators. They typically only resort to this if camouflage and intimidation do not work. When it squirts out blood, it aims for the predator's mouth and eyes. This stream can range up to 4 feet (1.2 m) and may be repeated several times. The stream comes out through its lower eyelids' pores. Some other defensive behaviors include gulping air and poking with the horns.

== Reproduction ==
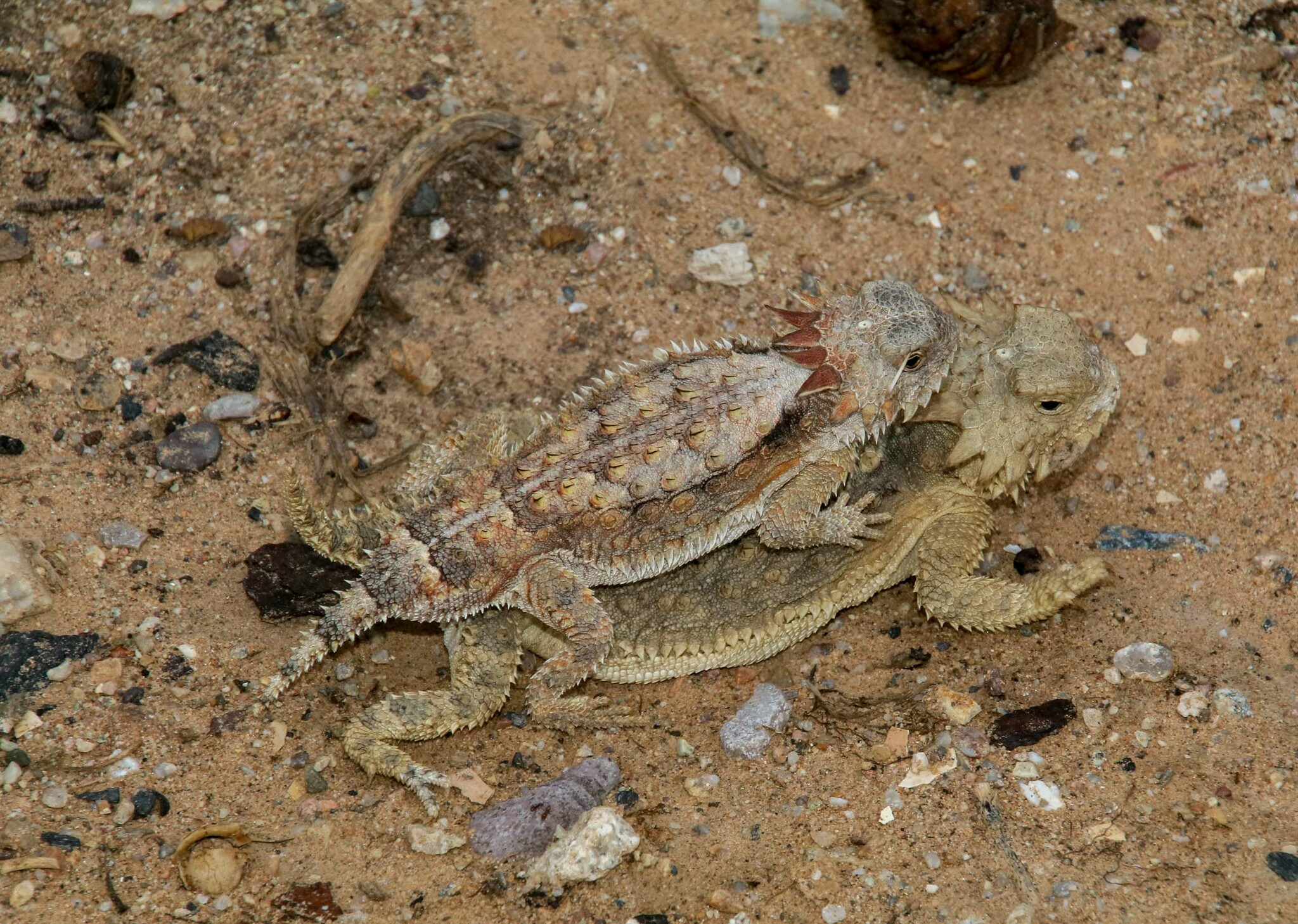
Mating, in Arizona

Regal horned lizards are oviparous and reproduce via sexual reproduction (specifically internal fertilization). Females tend to be ovulating in July and August. Males tend to exhibit enlarged reproductive organs (testes, vasa deferentia, and hemipenes) when in preparation for mating. Males were shown to have exhibited these enlargements from June to August. Several tactics are used to attract a mate, such as head bopping, push-ups, and nodding of the head. Females lay eggs in the generally time range of June to August. A range of 7–30 eggs are laid per clutch and females typically lay only one clutch annually. The eggs are laid in nests which are semicircular tunnels dug at an angle, allowing the nest to be shaded for longer periods of the day. Typically they nest in moist fine silt or sand. The egg shells are white and flexible and average about one-half inch in diameter. The hatchlings receive no parental care upon hatching and immediately bury themselves in the sand. They are now responsible for finding and hunting for their own food.

== Gallery ==
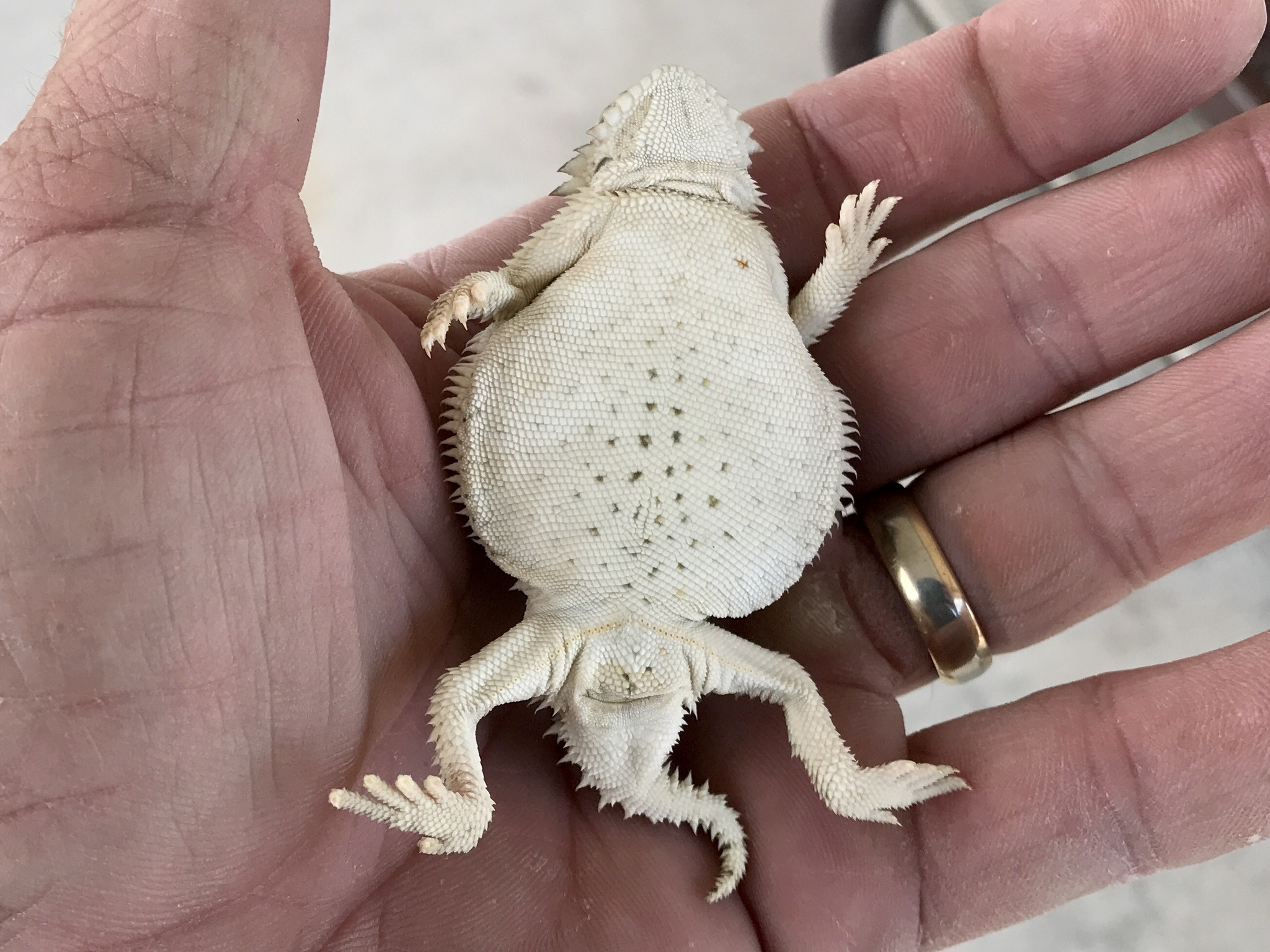
Showing underside, at Pima County, Arizona

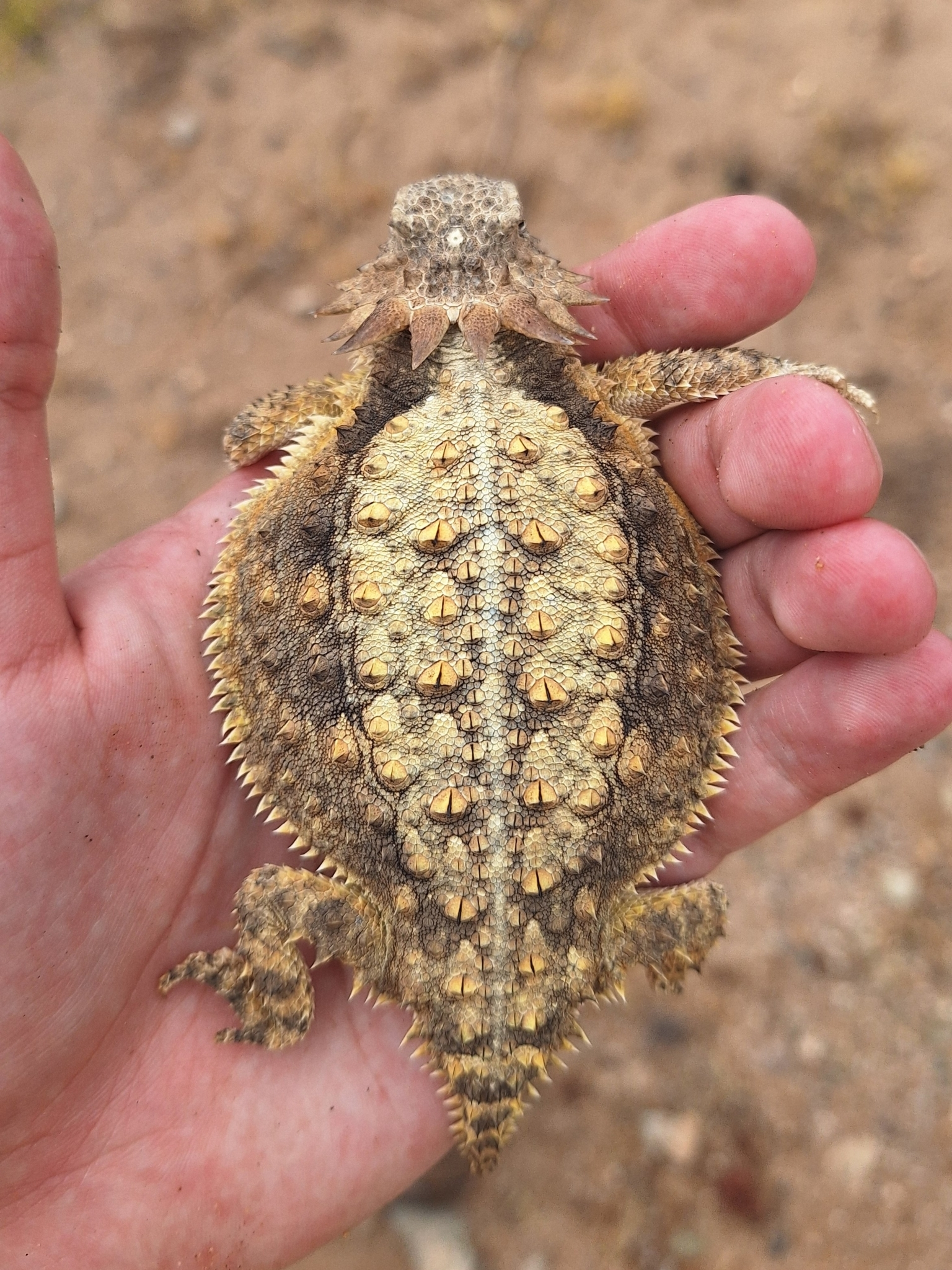
Pima County, Arizona

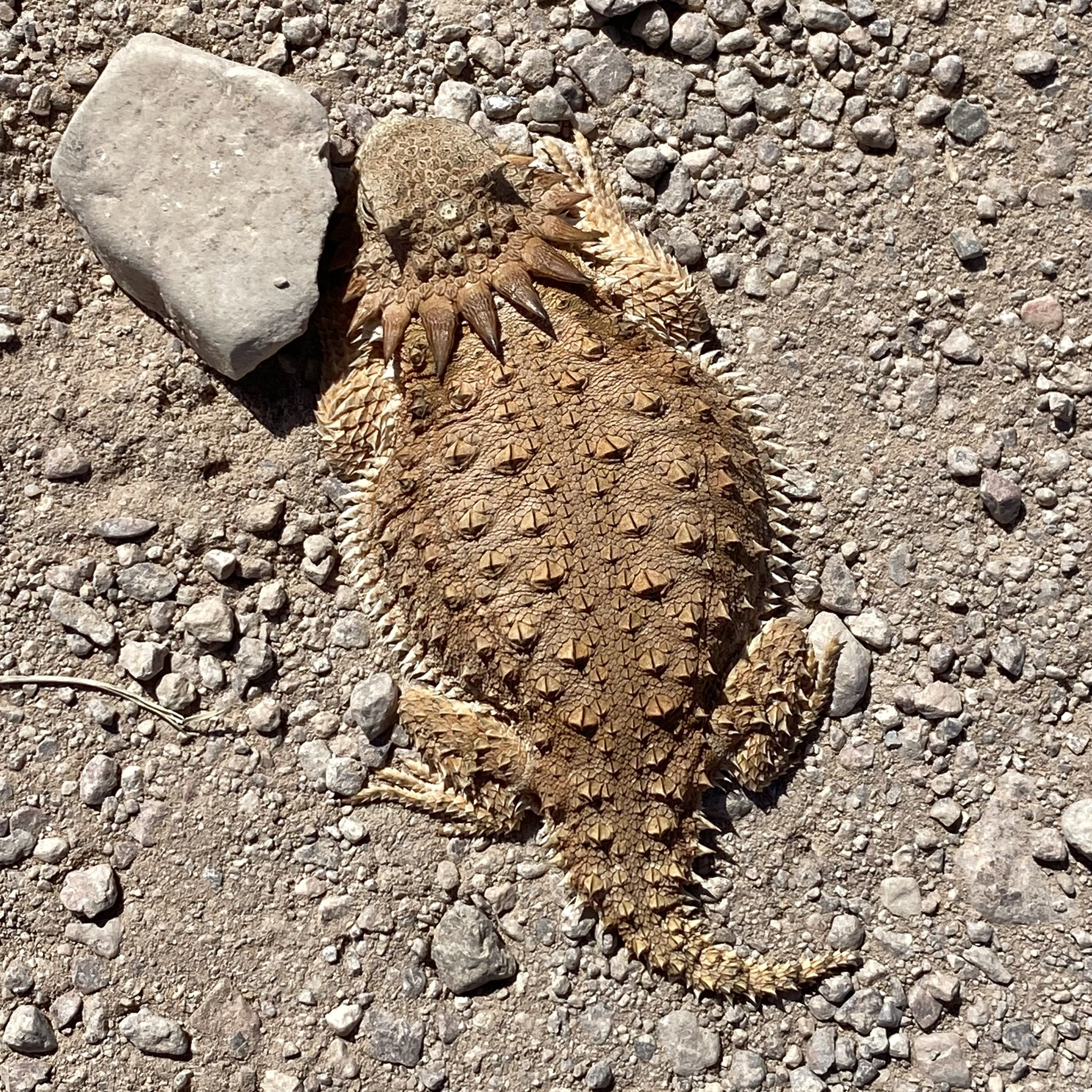
At Santa Cruz County, Arizona

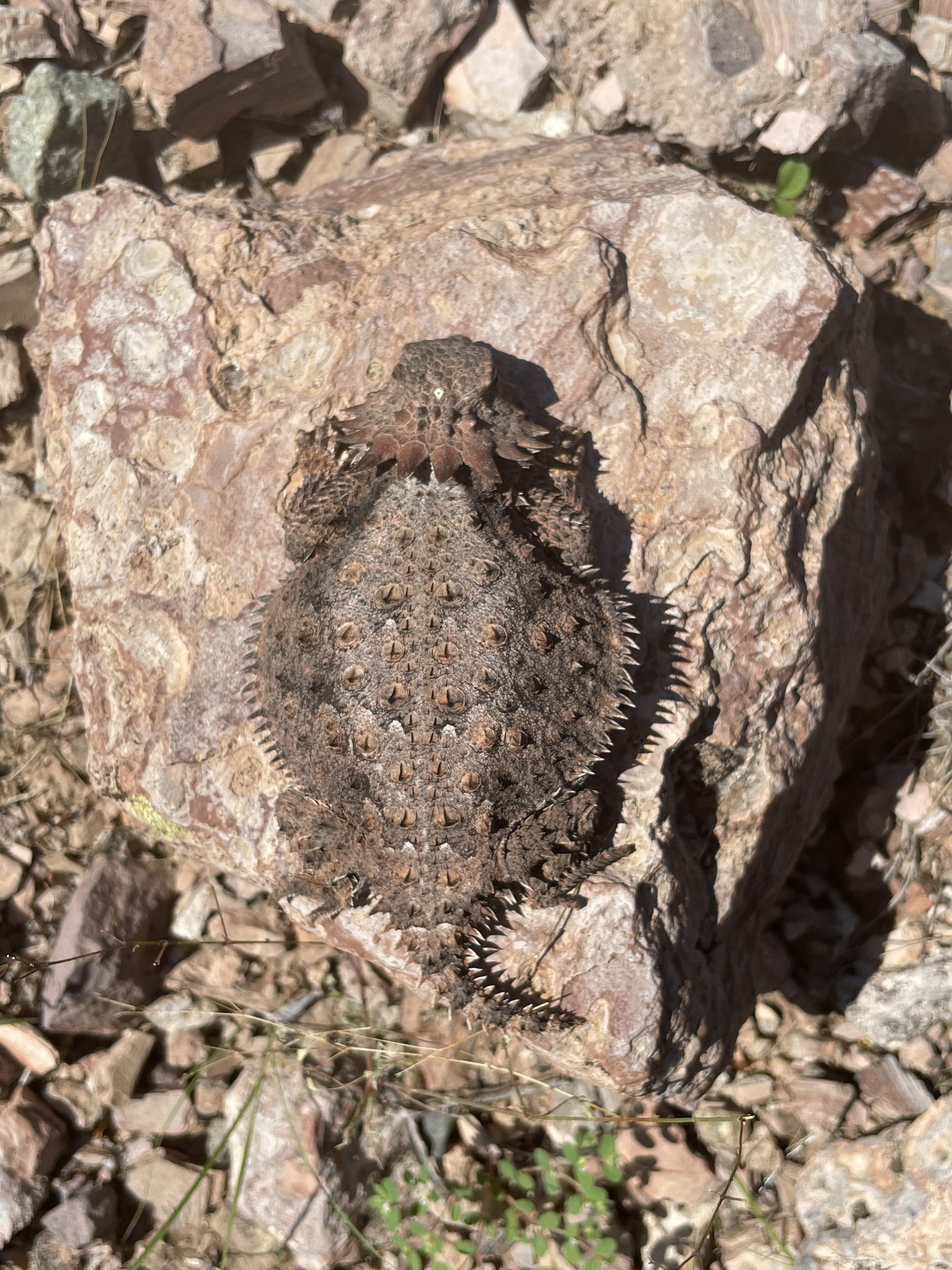
At Pima County, Arizona

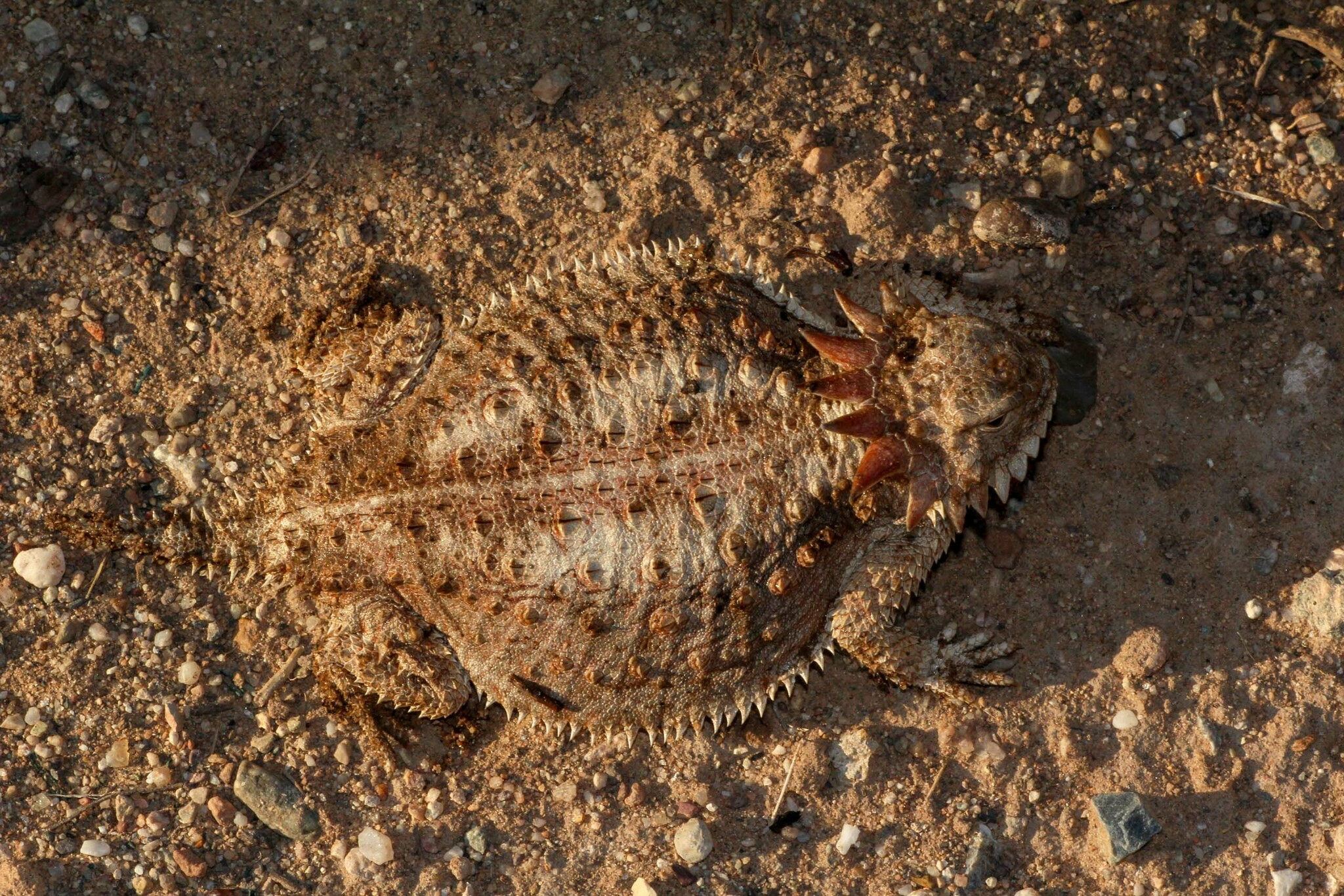
At Pinal County, Arizona

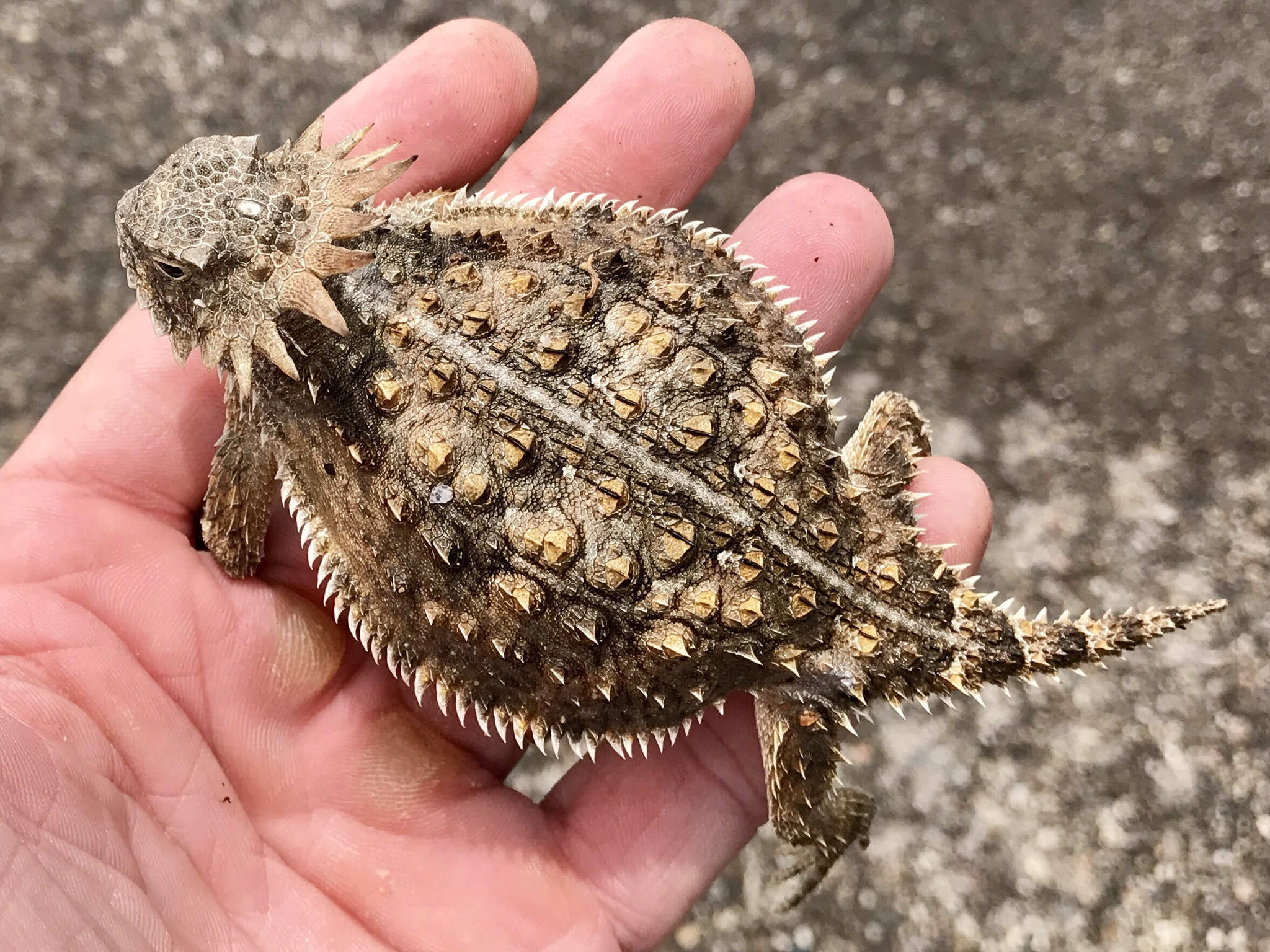
At Pima County, Arizona

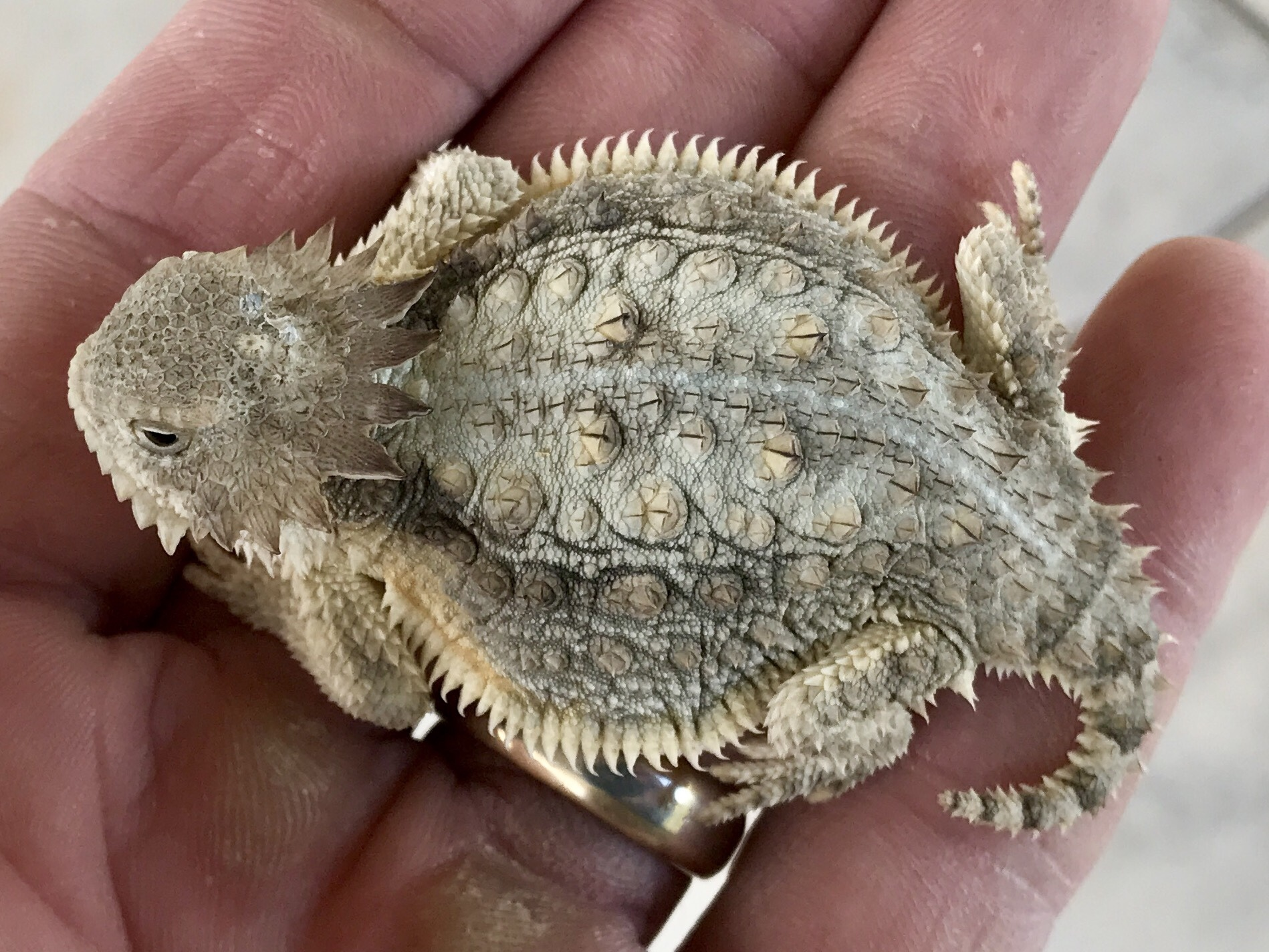
At Pima County, Arizona

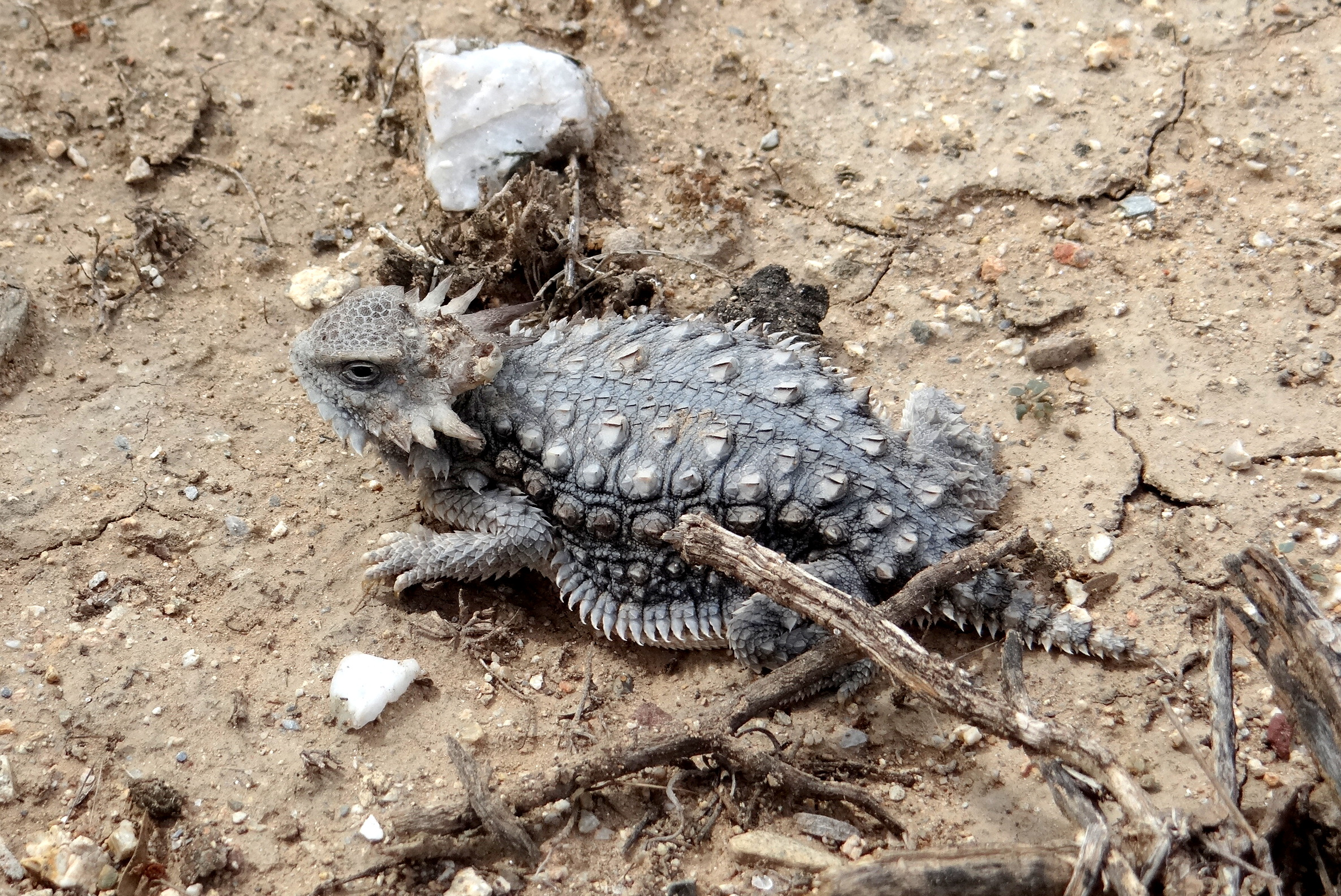
